= 2012 Hama offensive =

Military operation during the Syrian Civil War

Coordinates: 35.1333°N 36.7500°E

- Part of the Syrian Civil War
- Frontlines during and following the offensive Syrian government control Syrian opposition control
Date	16–31 December 2012 (2 weeks and 1 day)
Location	Hama Governorate, Syria
Result	Offensive halted: FSA fighters take control of 10 towns and villages in northern Hama; Halfaya massacre; Syrian Army counterattack recaptures several towns and villages

Belligerents
Syrian Opposition	(Syria) Syrian Government

Commanders and leaders
Yusuf Hasan	Unknown

Units involved
Free Syrian Army	Syrian Armed Forces

Strength
~1,000 fighters	2,000 soldiers

Casualties and losses
132 killed	111 killed
- 90–200 civilians killed

The 2012 Hama offensive was a military operation during the Syrian Civil War launched by the Syrian opposition on 16 December 2012, with the intent of taking control of the Hama Province. The offensive was stopped after the Syrian Army launched a counter-offensive, leaving the rebels in control of only half a dozen towns and villages in the north of the province.

== Background ==
With the Hama province largely controlled by Army Forces, the FSA launched an offensive on 16 December, to capture the province and Hama city itself and by the same time, cutting the principal supply route of the Army in Aleppo.

== The offensive ==
The rebel military council of Hama announced the start of the offensive on 16 December, giving Syrian government troops in the province an ultimatum to surrender to the Free Syrian Army within 48 hours. Within two days, the Syrian Observatory for Human Rights and Qassem Saadeddine, a member of the Free Syrian Army military command, claimed that Syrian government troops had already been cleared from the towns of Halfaya, Kafr Nabudah, Hayalin, Hasraya, al-Lataminah, Taybat al-Imam and Kafr Zita, leaving the rebels in control of the rural western part of Hama Province, and all areas north of Hama city. Rebels had advanced 40 kilometres (25 mi) south from Maarrat al-Nu'man and Jisr ash-Shugour, encountering little resistance. It seemed that rebels had overrun Syrian Army lines north of Hama city within 48 hours. Government positions in Khan Shaykhun and Mhardeh were reportedly under attack by rebel forces.

The rebels also made claims of fighting inside Hama city itself, with international analysts wondering if the Syrian Army was redeployed towards Homs and Latakia. However, this was not confirmed. According to the Local Coordination Committees (LCC), Syrian Government security forces reportedly set up checkpoints outside Hayalin, leading to doubts as to whether or not rebels had full control over the town, unlike the other places they captured in the operation. The rebels attacked and captured parts of the town of Morek in Hama's countryside on 20 December. In addition, their forces surrounded the Alawite towns of Ma'an and al-Tleisa.

A few days later, the LCC and SOHR reported that up to 300 civilians were killed by bombing from warplanes in the city of Halfaya, while queuing for bread at a bakery. The Syrian Government did agree that many women and children were killed, however they blamed rebel fighters who they say attacked the town. The Syrian Army managed to retake control of three Alawite villages by 26 December, including Ma'an, repelling the rebels who had entered them days earlier. On 29 December, six people were killed by the Syrian air force bombardment on the town of Kafr Nabudah, two of them were children. Also, one civilian was killed by the bombardment on the town of Taybat al-Imam. Assad forces from Qamhana, attacked this same town a week later. The next day, the Syrian Army general command announced that their forces retook control of the strategic town of Morek. The Syrian Army reportedly shelled Halfaya on 31 December.

== Aftermath ==
Rebel offensive towards Hama from December 2012 to January 2013

On 21 January 2013, SOHR said that a car bomb near the headquarters of a pro-government militia killed 50 people in the eastern suburbs of Hama.

On 22 January, the military launched an offensive, with the aim of recapturing territory lost during the rebel advance into northern Hama. 1,500 soldiers and 100 tanks were being used in the operation, and the focus was on the town of Kernaz in Mhardeh District, where up to 1,000 rebel fighters were based. By early February, the rebels were reportedly in fear of losing Kernaz and with it Kafr Naboudeh. This would leave the military in control of the whole north of Hama, reversing all previous rebel gains.

On 6 February, 54 government employees of a defense-related factory were killed in al-Buraq south of Hama city, when a mini-bus blew up at a bus stop.

On 7 February, the military recaptured Kernaz, after 16 days of fighting. Two days before, the Army had also regained control of the nearby town of Mughir, securing a corridor to Alawite villages in the west of the province.

== See also ==
- 2012 Homs offensive
- Battle of Damascus (2012)
- Battle of Raqqa (2013)
