= Al-Lataminah =

Al-Lataminah اللطامنة Latamneh
- Town
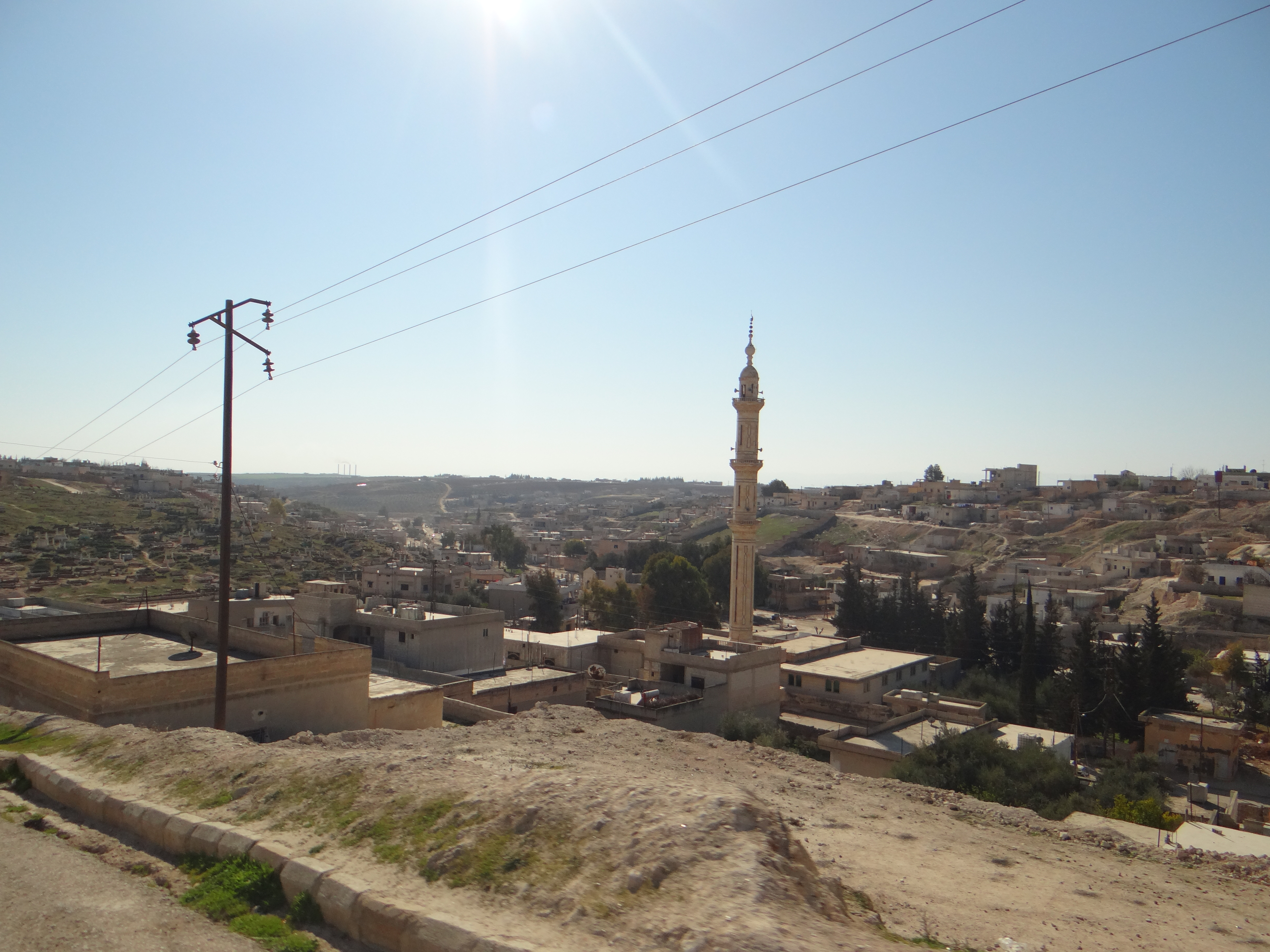
- Al-Lataminah in 2014

- Location in Syria
- Coordinates: 35°19′15″N 36°37′21″E
- Country: Syria
- Governorate: Hama
- District: Mahardah
- Subdistrict: Kafr Zita

Population (2004)
  - Total: 16,267
- Time zone: UTC+3 (AST)

Al-Lataminah (Arabic: اللطامنة, also spelled Latamneh or Latamnah) is a town in northern Syria, administratively part of the Hama Governorate, located 39 kilometres (24 mi) northwest of Hama. Nearby localities include Karnaz to the northwest, Kafr Zita to the north, Murik to the northeast, Suran to the east, Taybat al-Imam to the southeast, Halfaya and Mahardah to the south, Shaizar and Kafr Hud to the southwest and Hayalin and al-Suqaylabiyah to the west. According to the Syria Central Bureau of Statistics (CBS), al-Lataminah had a population of 16,267 in the 2004 census, making it the second largest locality in the nahiyah of Kafr Zita. Its inhabitants are predominantly Sunni Muslims.

Al-Lataminah and its vicinity contain several caves, many of which had been used as homes for the village's residents. On the eve of the civil war, the use of modern housing had prevailed, but a few families continued to live in the caves. During the course of the war, most of residents were displaced.

== History ==
Al-Lataminah was inhabited during the Stone Age and excavations by teams from the Arab world, the United States, France and the Netherlands have been held at the site. One such excavation was held in 1965 and several artifacts were uncovered.

=== Ottoman era ===
When Swiss traveler Johann Ludwig Burckhardt visited the region in the early 19th century, during Ottoman rule, al-Lataminah was described as the "principal village" of Sanjak Hama. During this period the village was part of the Sanjak (District) of Hama and in late 1829, it consisted of 84 faddan, larger than any other village in the district except for Taldou. It paid 8,250 qirsh in taxes, the highest rate of the revenue-producing (hasil) villages in the district. In 1838, it had a predominantly Sunni Muslim population. Towards the end of Egyptian Khedivate rule (1832–1841), in 1840, al-Lataminah was a large village that paid a moderate tax rate of 700 qirsh, as result of a tax decrease for rural villages at the expense of urban towns.

=== Ongoing Syrian civil war ===
The Syrian state media reported that on 9 March 2012, al-Lataminah's mayor was kidnapped from his home by anti-government fighters. His car had been stolen earlier on 30 September 2011. On 7 April 2012 secret United Nations monitors reported that dozens of residents were killed when the village was shelled by government forces, days before a truce was to be established. The fatality count ranged from 24 to 27 and activists reported that the shelling was part of an attempt by security forces to raid the town after two days of clashes with defectors from the Syrian Army.

In September 2012 Al Jazeera English classified al-Lataminah as a "rebel village". A girl was reportedly killed and several more people were injured as a result of shelling by government forces on 12 September. In a mid-December 2012 rebel offensive against government-held positions in the Hama Governorate, al-Lataminah was captured by opposition forces along with a string of several other villages.

Gas attacks were reported as occurring in Al-Lataminah in October 2016. Additional attacks occurred on 24 and 25 March in 2017. They were substantially confirmed a year later by the Organisation for the Prohibition of Chemical Weapons (OPCW) as having been a sarin gas attack, and a chlorine gas attack, respectively. Another sarin gas attack occurred on 30 March 2017. On April 8, 2020, the OPCW issued a report determining that the Syrian Air Force was the perpetrator of these chemical weapon attacks.

From 2017, the city was situated in the southernmost sector of rebel-held territory (sometimes called the Idlib pocket although Al-Lataminah is part of Hama Governate). As a result, the city was exposed to attacks by the Syrian Arab Armed Forces from three directions, and suffered repeated bombardments and Russian airstrikes despite the cease-fire arrangements supposedly provided by the 2016 Astana accord.

On 20 August 2019, the Syrian Observatory for Human Rights reported that the rebel and Islamist factions including jihadist groups like Hayat Tahrir al-Sham (HTS) had withdrawn from Lataminah in north Hama province amid a military operation by Syrian government forces.

On 30 November 2024, HTS rebels recaptured the city from the Syrian Army during the Hama offensive.

== Bibliography ==
- Burckhardt, John Lewis (1822). Travels in Syria and the Holy Land. J. Murray.
- Douwes, Dick (2000). The Ottomans in Syria: a history of justice and oppression. I.B. Tauris. ISBN 1860640311.
- Fansa, Mamoun (2008). Die Kunst der frühen Christen in Syrien: Zeichen, Bilder und Symbole vom 4. bis 7. Jahrhundert : Begleitband zur Sonderausstellung im Landesmuseum Natur und Mensch Oldenburg (in German). Zabern. ISBN 978-3805339193.
- Robinson, E.; Smith, E. (1841). Biblical Researches in Palestine, Mount Sinai and Arabia Petraea: A Journal of Travels in the year 1838. Vol. 3. Boston: Crocker & Brewster.
