= Hayalin =

Hayalin حيالين Hayaleen
- Village
- Location in Syria
- Coordinates: 35.351256°N 36.448345°E
- Country: Syria
- Governorate: Hama
- District: Al-Suqaylabiyah
- Subdistrict: Al-Suqaylabiyah

Population (2004)
  - Total: 3,913
- Time zone: UTC+3 (AST)

Hayalin (Arabic: حيالين, also spelled Hayaleen or Hiyalin) is a village in northwestern Syria, administratively part of the Hama Governorate, located northwest of Hama. Nearby localities include al-Suqaylabiyah, the administrative center of the district, to the west, Qalaat al-Madiq to the northwest, Bureij and Kirnaz to the north, al-Lataminah to the east, Shaizar, Tremseh and Safsafiyah to the southeast and Tell Salhab to the south. According to the Central Bureau of Statistics, it had a population of 3,913 in the 2004 census. Its inhabitants are predominantly Sunni Muslims.

In 2005 18 people from Hayalin were detained in mass countrywide arrests of suspected Islamists or membership of the Muslim Brotherhood, a serious offense in Syria. During the ongoing Syrian Civil War that began in 2011, Hayalin has experienced violence as a result of fighting between government forces and opposition rebels. The Syrian Observatory for Human Rights (SOHR) reported that government forces shelled the village on 13 May 2012. Rebels claimed to have captured Hayalin On 17 December along with a string of other towns during an offensive against the Hama region. According to the Local Coordination Committees (LCC), security forces reportedly surrounded checkpoints outside the village, leading to doubts as to whether rebels had full control over Hayalin, unlike the other places they captured in the operation. On 7 July 2013, the Syrian Army captured the town.

== Bibliography ==
- Cordesman, Anthony H. (2006). Arab-Israeli Military Forces in an Era of Asymmetric War. Greenwood Publishing Group. ISBN 0275991865.
- Robinson, E.; Smith, E. (1841). Biblical Researches in Palestine, Mount Sinai and Arabia Petraea: A Journal of Travels in the year 1838. Vol. 3. Boston: Crocker & Brewster.
