= Kafr Zita =

Kafr Zita كفر زيتا Kafr Zayta
- Town
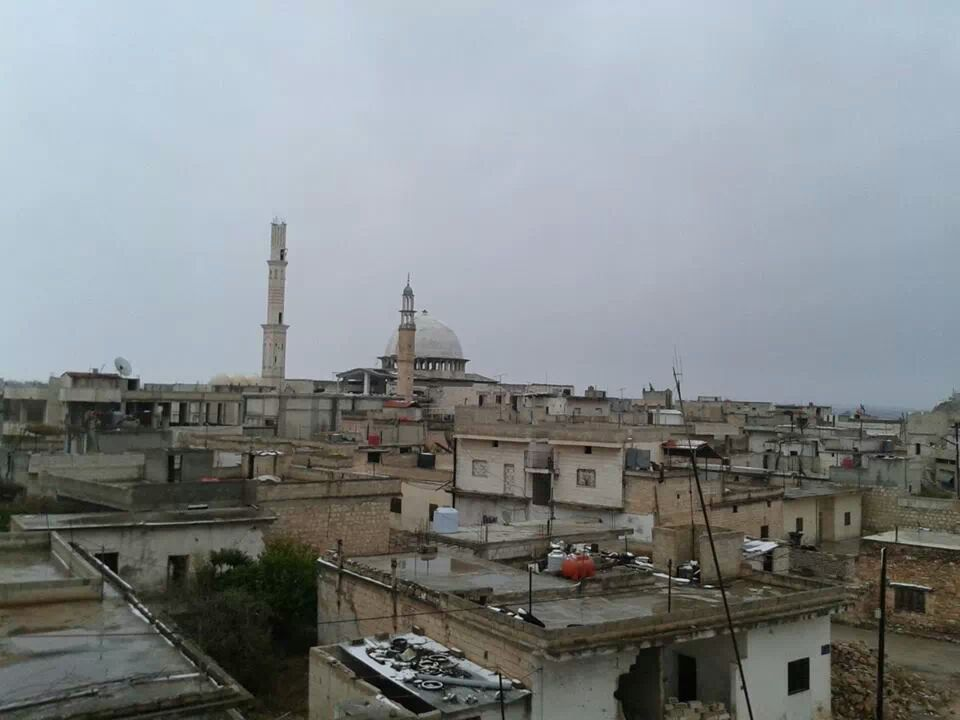
- Kafr Zita, in 2013

- Location in Syria
- Coordinates: 35°22′25″N 36°36′6″E
- Country: Syria
- Governorate: Hama
- District: Mahardah
- Subdistrict: Kafr Zita

Population (2004)
  - Total: 17,052
- Time zone: UTC+3 (AST)

Kafr Zita (Arabic: كفر زيتا, romanized: Kafr Zaytā; also transliterated Kfar Zita, Kafr Zayta, Kfar Zeita, Keferzita or Kafr Zeita) is a town in central Syria, administratively part of the Hama Governorate, located 30 kilometers (19 mi) north of Hama. Nearby localities include Kafr Nabudah and al-Habit to the northwest, Khan Shaykhun to the northeast, Mork to the east, Suran to the southeast, al-Lataminah, Halfaya and Mahardah to the south, Tremseh to the southwest and Kirnaz and Hayalin. According to the Syria Central Bureau of Statistics, Kafr Zita had a population of 17,052 in the 2004 census. It is also the center of a nahiyah (subdistrict), part of the Mahardah District, that consists of seven localities with a combined population of 39,032 in 2004. Its inhabitants are predominantly Sunni Muslims.

== Etymology ==
The first word of Kafr Zita, which is Kafr, is a Syriac word for "farm" or "village". The second word 'Zita' is another Syriac word which refers to olive oil. The village is known for cultivation of olives which is still until now one of the main crops of the village. Also pistachio became popular recently regarding to its better economic revenue.

== History ==
The ruins of a 5th-century Byzantine church and a 7th-century Umayyad mosque have been found in Kafr Zita.

In the late Ottoman period, between the 18th-19th centuries, the residents of Kafr Zita, which at that time was one of the largest villages in the area north of the Orontes River, were regularly in arrears for tax payment and had to obtain financial assistance.

During the period of the French Mandate in Syria, Kafr Zita, like many of the surrounding localities, was organized as a collective farming village. The residents claimed ancestry from the Mawali tribe, which had dominated the Syrian steppe until migrating to northwestern Syria in the late 18th century. In 1975 the nahiyahs (subdistricts) of Kafr Zita and Mahardah were joined together to form the Mahardah District, with Mahardah as capital.

=== Syrian civil war ===
On 16 December 2012, during the Syrian uprising against the government of Bashar al-Assad that began in early 2011, government forces combating rebels bombed Kafr Zita, leaving three children dead, according to the Syrian Observatory for Human Rights (SOHR). On 20 December rebels claimed to have captured Kafr Zita and a string of other nearby towns during an offensive against government forces in the vicinity of Hama. In September 2013, Abu Shafiq checkpoint (35.375°N 36.652°E) which is between Kafr Zita and Morek, was captured by rebels. However, on 22 September 2014, it was reported that the rebels targeted the checkpoint. By early January 2014, the town was controlled by the Islamic State of Iraq and the Levant. However, later on, ISIL was removed from the town by the rebels.

On 20 August 2019, the Syrian Observatory for Human Rights reported that the rebel and Islamic factions including jihadist group Hayat Tahrir al-Sham (HTS) had withdrawn from Kafr Zita in north Hama province.

On 30 November 2024, HTS militants captured the city from the Syrian Army during the Hama offensive.

== See also ==
- 2014 Kafr Zita chemical attack

== Notable people ==
- Mustafa Bakour (*1964), Chief of Staff of the Syrian Air Force since 14 March 2025

== Bibliography ==
- Centre d'études et de recherches URBAMA (France) (1986). Petites villes et villes moyennes dans le monde arabe (in French). Vol. 2. Université de Tours. ISBN 9782869060128.
- Comité de l'Asie française (April 1933). "Notes sur la propriété foncière dans le Syrie centrale (Notes on Landownership in Central Syria)". Bulletin du Comité de l'Asie française (in French). 33 (309). Comité de l'Asie française: 130–137.
- Douwes, Dick; Lewis, Norman N. (1992). "Taxation And Agriculture In the District of Hama, 1800–1831; New Material From the Records Of the Religious Court". In Phillip, Thomas (ed.). The Syrian Land in the 18th and 19th Century: The Common and the Specific in the Historical Experience. F. Steiner. pp. 261–284. ISBN 3515056858.
- Douwes, Dick (2000). The Ottomans in Syria: A History of Justice and Oppression. I.B. Tauris. ISBN 1860640311.
