= Asilah, Syria =

Asilah أصيلة Asileh
- Village
- Location in Syria
- Coordinates: 35°11′49″N 36°29′20″E
- Country: Syria
- Governorate: Hama
- District: Masyaf
- Subdistrict: Jubb Ramlah

Population (2004)
  - Total: 5,790
- Time zone: UTC+3 (AST)

Asilah (Arabic: أصيلة, also spelled Asileh and Asila) is a village in northwestern Syria, administratively part of the Hama Governorate, located west of Hama. Nearby localities include Khunayzir and Mhardeh to the northeast, Maarzaf to the east, Umm al-Tuyur to the southeast, Deir al-Salib to the south, Hanjur to the southwest, Jubb Ramlah to the west, Tell Salhab to the northwest and Safsafiyah to the north. According to the Central Bureau of Statistics (CBS), Asilah had a population of 5,790 in the 2004 census. Its inhabitants are predominantly Alawites.

== History ==
In March of 2012, five villagers were killed by opposition gunmen and a teacher kidnapped, after its residents were accused of taking part in government military operations against the neighboring village of Halfaya. In retaliation, militiamen from the village are widely believed to have taken part in the Al-Qubeir massacre in conjunction with the Syrian Army. Three more villagers were killed on September 6, 2017, after it was shelled by Jaysh al-Izza members, who accused residents of taking part in the killing of eleven civilians in the nearby village of Maarzaf.
