= Kafr Nabudah =

Kafr Nabudah كفر نبودة Kafar Nabuda
- Town
- Location in Syria
- Coordinates: 35°25′54″N 36°29′34″E
- Country: Syria
- Governorate: Hama
- District: Al-Suqaylabiyah
- Subdistrict: Qalaat al-Madiq

Population (2004)
  - Total: 13,513
  - Ethnicities: Syrians
- Time zone: UTC+3 (AST)

Kafr Nabudah (Arabic: كفر نبودة, also spelled Kafar Nabuda) is a town in northern Syria, administratively part of the Hama Governorate, located northwest of Hama. Nearby localities include Qalaat al-Madiq and Jamasat Udayat to the west, al-Suqaylabiyah to the southwest, al-Mughayr and Karnaz to the south, Kafr Zita to the southeast and al-Habit to the east. According to the Syria Central Bureau of Statistics (CBS), Kafr Nabudah had a population of 13,513 in the 2004 census, making it the largest locality in the Qalaat al-Madiq nahiyah ("subdistrict.")

== History ==
In 2011, a mosaic was discovered in Kafr Nabudah dates back to the 6th century during the Byzantine era. By 1526, the settlement was home to 18 households and 4 bachelors, but by the end of the 16th century it had shrunk to only 6 households.

In 1838, its inhabitants were noted as being predominantly Sunni Muslims.

During the Syrian Civil War, the town quickly fell to Syrian opposition forces, but would be shelled repeatedly by both the regime (in 2013) and Russian (in 2015) air forces. The Syrian army regained control of the town during the Northwestern Syria offensive on June 2, 2019.

On 30 November 2024, HTS rebels recaptured the city from the Syrian Army.

As of 21 April 2025, 2,175 residents have returned to the town, which had been deserted prior to the end of the Syrian Civil War.

== Bibliography ==
- Robinson, E.; Smith, E. (1841). Biblical Researches in Palestine, Mount Sinai and Arabia Petraea: A Journal of Travels in the year 1838. Vol. 3. Boston: Crocker & Brewster.
