= Al-Asman =

Al-Asman العصمان
- Village
- Location in Syria
- Coordinates: 35°18′54″N 36°30′8″E
- Country: Syria
- Governorate: Hama
- District: Mahardah
- Subdistrict: Karnaz

Population (2004)
  - Total: 57
- Time zone: UTC+3 (AST)
- City Qrya Pcode: N/A

Al-Asman (Arabic: العصمان) is a Syrian hamlet located in the Karnaz Subdistrict of the Mahardah District in Hama Governorate. According to the Syria Central Bureau of Statistics, al-Asman had a population of 57 in the 2004 census.
