= Tremseh =

Tremseh التريمسة Turaymisah
- Town
- Location in Syria
- Coordinates: 35°16′23″N 36°30′17″E
- Country: Syria
- Governorate: Hama
- District: Mahardah
- Subdistrict: Mahardah

Population (2004)
  - Total: 6,927
- Time zone: UTC+3 (AST)

Tremseh (Arabic: التريمسة, al-Turaymisah), or in various dialects Tremseh, Treimsa, Taramsah, Taramseh in the Hama Governorate in northern Syria. It is roughly 22 miles northwest of the central city of Hama. Nearby localities include district center Mahardah and Shaizar to the east, Khunayzir to the southeast, Asilah to the south, Safsafiyah to the southwest, Asharnah and Tell Salhab to the west, al-Jalmah to the north and Kafr Hud to the northeast. According to the Syria Central Bureau of Statistics (CBS), Tremseh had a population of 6,926 in the 2004 census. The town was reported to have a population of between 7,000 and 11,000.

In 1838 Tremseh was classified as an abandoned village by scholar Eli Smith.

Tremseh was the site where the Battle of Tremseh occurred in July 2012. The residents Tremseh are mostly Sunni Muslims.

== Bibliography ==
- Robinson, E.; Smith, E. (1841). Biblical Researches in Palestine, Mount Sinai and Arabia Petraea: A Journal of Travels in the year 1838. Vol. 3. Boston: Crocker & Brewster.
