= Al-Suqaylabiyah =

City in Hama, Syria

al‑Suqaylabiyah السقيلبية
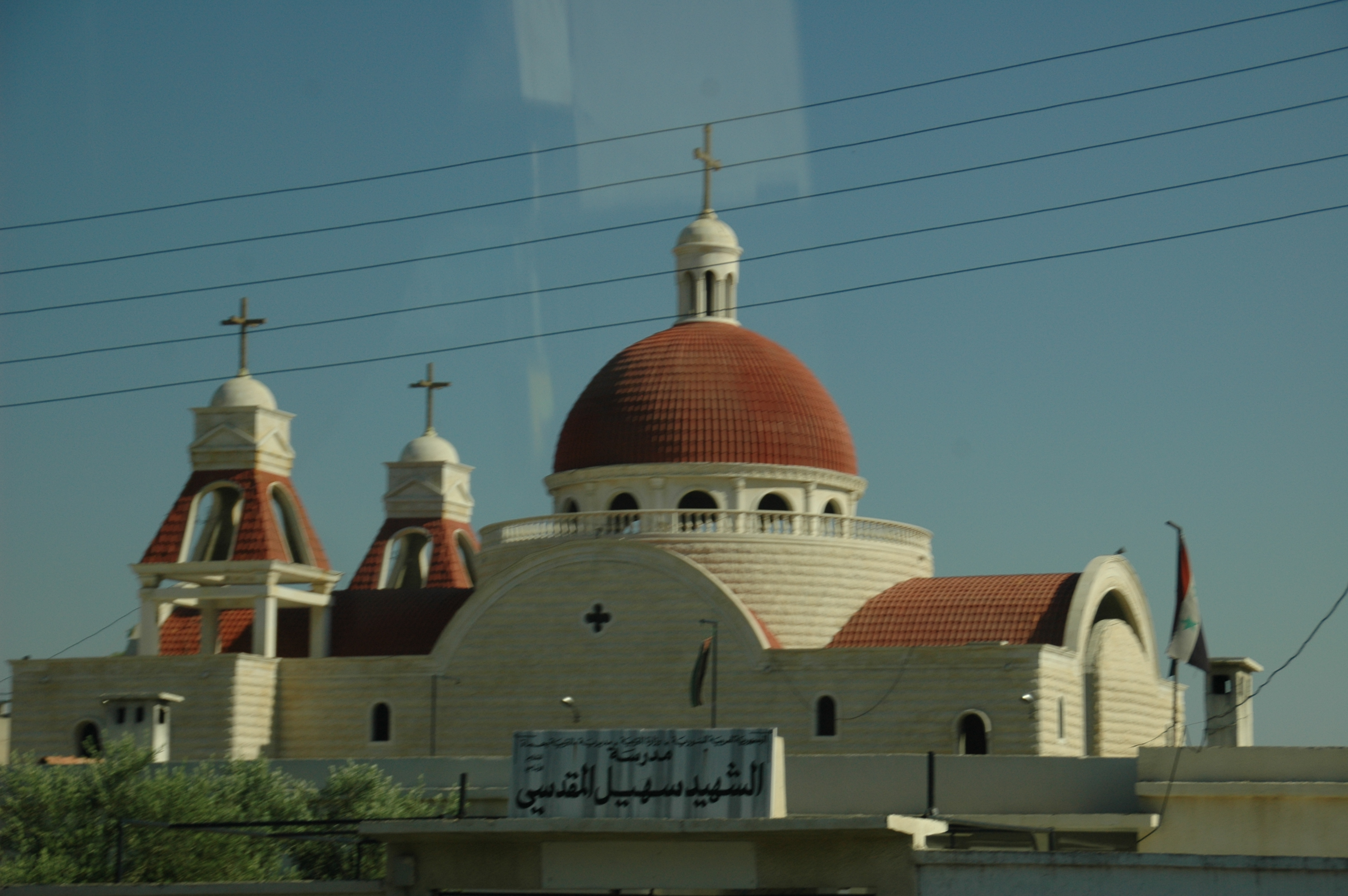
- Church of St. Peter & St. Paul in al-Suqaylabiyah, 2008

- Location in Syria
- Coordinates: 35°21′56″N 36°23′38″E
- Country: Syria
- Governorate: Hama
- District: Suqaylabiyah
- Subdistrict: Suqaylabiyah

Population (2004)
  - Total: 13,920
- Time zone: UTC+3 (AST)

Al-Suqaylabiyah (Arabic: السقيلبية, romanized: al-Suqaylabīya, Greek: Σουκαϊλιμπίγια, romanized: Soukailimpiyia) is a city in western Syria, administratively part of the Hama Governorate. It is located about 48 kilometers (30 mi) from Hama and overlooks the Ghab Valley. According to the 2004 official census, the town had a population of 13,920. In 2009, the population was recorded at around 20,000. Its inhabitants are largely Greek Orthodox Christians.

The city derives its name from Seleucia ad Belum, an ancient Seleucid city that was located in its vicinity. Modern al-Suqaylabiyah was established in the mid to late 19th century, during the late Ottoman period, by Greek Orthodox Christians from the villages of the Syrian coastal mountains, including many emigrants originally from the Hauran. Travelers in the c. 1880s noted its prosperity. During the French Mandatory period (1920s–1943), it was a large village that grew quality wheat and, rare for the Hama region, its lands were owned by its residents rather than the urban elites of Hama.

Al-Suqaylabiyah developed significantly in the 1960s as a result of the land reclamation projects in the Ghab Valley and became the administrative center of the newly-formed Ghab District in 1964, attaining city status in the process. The city serves as a major agricultural and commercial center for its area, connecting communities in the coastal mountains with the major cities of Syria's interior plain.

== Geography ==
Al-Suqaylabiyah is located in the northwestern section of the Hama Governorate, about 48 kilometers (30 mi) from the governorate capital of Hama. The city overlooks the Ghab Valley and is a commercial center connecting the communities of the Syrian Coastal Mountain Range with the country's interior plains. The old center of al-Suqaylabiyah sits on a hill with an elevation of about 300 meters (980 ft) above sea level.

In its latest master plan, al-Suqaylabiyah consisted of over 450 hectares. Its districts or neighborhoods were the Old Town, Sahm al-Baydar, Sultaniya, al-Tell, al-Souq, al-Abra and Ayn al-Barada. Sahm al-Baydar is the largest district, lying to the city's south along the road to Hama. Sultaniya lies along the southwestern edge of al-Suqaylabiyah. The Old Town and al-Tell form the old center of the city and contain a number of archaeological remains, including Roman-era olive presses. Along the latter two districts' southern and southwestern edge is al-Souq ('the Market'), where residents of the surrounding communities sell their dairy and produce and buy goods. Most government offices, the public hospital and schools are located in the Abra district.

== History ==
The name goes back to the ancient Seleucia ad Belum, a town of Hellenistic foundation that was located almost at the same place. The site was abandoned during the Middle Ages.

=== Ottoman period ===
According to an 1828–29 Ottoman tax record, al-Suqaylabiyah was a farm or hamlet consisting of 12 feddans. By 1838, it was a khirba (deserted or ruined village).

The modern town was established at a later point in the 19th century by Greek Orthodox Christians who had emigrated from the Hauran region in southern Syria in the late 18th century to escape persecution by Ottoman authorities. The emigrants had first settled in Ayn al-Kurum, in the foothills of the largely Alawite-inhabited Coastal Mountain Range, before moving down to the site of al-Suqaylabiyah. The Hauranis were joined by several Christian families originally from the Coastal Mountain Range, including from the villages of Ayn al-Kurum, Maradash, Anab, Dabbash and Arnaba. According to a late 20th-century local authority, Ghaith al-Abdallah, the Christian emigrants of these villages had gathered and decided together to settle the tell (archaeological mound) of al-Suqaylabiyah, trading the high mountains, lush forests and hunting grounds, fertile gardens and copious springs of their original homes for the impregnability and strategic location of their new home.

During the 1860 civil conflict in Syria, local Bedouin tribes attacked al-Suqaylabiyah. In 1879, the German orientalist Eduard Sachau visited al-Suqaylabiyah during a tour of the Hama region and noted it was a Christian village crowning a flat, round hilltop. Its leader was Sheikh Rustum and the village contained 100 houses and 200 riflemen. The Swiss historian Max van Berchem was hosted by its sheikh in 1885 and he described al-Suqaylabiyah as a large Orthodox Christian village perched on a mound with a wealthy and prosperous appearance. The sheikh's house was described as being surrounded by huts which formed the outbuildings of his residence; the complex was enclosed by a high wall of beaten earth with a crenellated top. The sheikh who hosted van Berchem was likely Sheikh S'ayyid, one of the village's leaders at that time; the other was Sheikh Ilyas.

=== French Mandatory period ===
In 1921, during the north Syrian revolts against French rule (which began soon after the Ottomans were driven from Syria in 1918), the villagers of al-Suqaylabiyah resisted incursions and raids by local bands of rebels. The local historian Wasfi Zakariyya, writing in the 1920s, described al-Suqaylabiyah as a village of 2,000 people with white houses. Its inhabitants were Orthodox Christians belonging to the Church of Antioch and resembled their coastal mountaineer neighbors in their Arabic dialect, clothing and beauty. The quality of their wheat was locally acclaimed and its seeds were used by most of the wheat-growing villages of the Hama region. In 1933, al-Suqaylabiyah was a relatively large village of 3,400 inhabitants. It, along with the large Orthodox Christian villages of Mhardeh and Kafr Buhum and the Sunni Muslim village of Suran, were the only localities in Hama's kaza (district) whose lands were not owned by the feudal urban elites of Hama.

=== Post-Syrian independence ===
Syria became independent in 1946. Beginning around 1950 and accelerating after 1960, al-Suqaylabiyah underwent significant urban expansion, largely owing to the major drainage and land reclamation project in the Ghab Valley. In 1964, it was made the center of the new Ghab District (al-Suqaylabiyah District), transitioning from village to city status in the process. It was officially declared a city in 1967. The city was connected to the electric grid in 1965. In 1967, the first regulatory plan was issued for the city by the central government and the most recent master plan issued (as of 2009) was in 2003. Just before Christmas 2024, it was reported that arsonists had set fire to the Christmas tree in the town.

=== Syrian Civil War ===
During the Syrian civil war Al-Suqaylabiyah acted as vital pro government center for local militias largely due to its strategic location near opposition held areas and its predominantly Christian population causing the town to become heavily militarized from 2013 onward. Analysis from The New Arab describes the town as being "sandwiched" between opposition Sunni towns and regime controlled areas, leading to a "local mobilisation" that militarised the community. Its alignment with the government forces made it a frequent target of shelling from nearby rebel-held territories especially Qalaat al-Madiq, leaving residents caught between opposing sides and leading to destruction. By 2 May 2019, at least 165 residents of the town had been killed of the course of the Syrian Civil War.

== Economy ==
A significant component of the population is engaged in agricultural production and the major crops are wheat, cotton, sugar beets, vegetables and legumes. The city's grain is processed in its own facilities, while its beets are sold through the sugar factory at Tell Salhab and its cotton is processed through the gins in Hama. Its poultry and fish farms serve the needs of the city and the surrounding villages. Other sources of employment include industry, trade and services. Before the civil war at least, al-Suqaylabiyah drew domestic and other Arab tourists attracted to its proximity to the Roman–Byzantine ruins of Apamea, the medieval castles of Qalaat al-Madiq and Abu Qubays, and the Nahr al-Bared springs. In 2009, the city had over 100 physicians, a 120-bed public hospital and two private hospitals: Al-Kindi and the Surgery and Obstetrics Hospital.

== Places of worship ==
The main church in al-Suqaylabiyah is the Church of St. Peter and St. Paul in the Sultaniya neighborhood. It was built in the neo-Byzantine style in 1994 and has a capacity for 600 parishioners. There is also a monastery in the city, the Dormition of the Lady. In July 2020, the Baathist Syrian government announced a plan to build a replica of the Hagia Sophia in al-Suqaylabiyah with Russian assistance as a reaction to its transformation into a mosque by Turkish authorities. Two years later, in July 2022, a missile attack during the church inauguration ceremony claimed two lives and left a dozen others injured.

== Bibliography ==
- Comité de l'Asie française (April 1933). "Notes sur la propriété foncière dans le Syrie centrale (Notes on Landownership in Central Syria)". Bulletin du Comité de l'Asie française (in French). 33 (309). Comité de l'Asie française: 131–137.
- Al-Dbiyat, Mohammed (1995). Homs et Hama en Syrie centrale: Concurrence urbaine et développement régional (Homs and Hama in Central Syria: Urban Competition and Regional Development) (in French). Presses de l'Ifpo. ISBN 2-901315-26-7.
- Douwes, Dick (2000). The Ottomans in Syria: A History of Justice and Oppression. I.B. Tauris. ISBN 1860640311.
- Robinson, E.; Smith, E. (1841). Biblical Researches in Palestine, Mount Sinai and Arabia Petraea: A Journal of Travels in the year 1838. Vol. 3. Boston: Crocker & Brewster.
- Sabour, Bassam (2023). Genius loci der gebauten Umwelt in Syrien: Von der Kultur zur Architektur, dargestellt unter besonderer Verarbeitung traditioneller Beispiele aus der Region Ġāb (Genius Loci of the Built Environment in Syria: From Culture to Architecture, Presented with Special Processing of Traditional Examples from the Ghab Region) (in German). Darmstadt: WBG Academic. ISBN 978-3-534-40802-3.
