= Nahr al-Bared, Syria =

Nahr al-Bared نهر البارد
- Village
- Location within Syria
- Coordinates: 35°17′N 36°20′E
- Country: Syria
- Governorate: Hama
- District: Al-Suqaylabiyah
- Subdistrict: Tell Salhab

Government
  - Mayor: Razoq Mohamad

Population (2004)
  - Total: 4,016
- Time zone: UTC+3 (AST)

Nahr al-Bared (Arabic: نهر البارد) is a village in northwestern Syria, administratively part of the Hama Governorate, located northwest of Hama. It is situated in the al-Ghab plain in the al-Suqaylabiyah District. Nearby localities include Tell Salhab to the south, al-Asharinah to the east, Hawrat Ammorin and al-Suqaylabiyah to the north and al-Mazhal and Ayn al-Kurum to the northwest. According to the Syria Central Bureau of Statistics, Nahr al-Bared had a population of 4,016 in the 2004 census. Its inhabitants are predominantly Alawites.

== Landscape ==
Although the village is considered modern, it still contains a number of ruins. The village is situated near the Nahr al Bārid river and during the winter regularly receives snow.

== Amenities ==
Nahr al-Bared has three hotels: Sahara Hotel, Abo Allosh and Abo Maher. There are three mosques in the village: al-Sheikh Abd al-Hadi Haidar, al-Sheikh Soliman Moaala and Ali Naser. The village has a large restaurant which can be accessed by using a micro bus. Nahr al-Bared also contains a large petrol station.
