= Taybat al-Imam =

Taybat al-Imam طيبة الإمام Tayyibat al-Imam
- Village
- Location in Syria
- Coordinates: 35°15′58″N 36°42′41″E
- Country: Syria
- Governorate: Hama
- District: Hama
- Subdistrict: Suran

Population (2004)
  - Total: 24,105

Taybat al-Imam (Arabic: طيبة الإمام, also transliterated Tayyibat al-Imam or Taibet el-Imam), historically known as Tayyibat al-A'la, is a town in northern Syria, administratively part of the Hama Governorate, located 18 kilometers (11 mi) northwest of Hama. Nearby localities include Halfaya and Mhardeh to the west, Lataminah to the northwest, Morek to the north, Suran to the east, Maar Shuhur to the southeast, Qamhana to the south and Khitab to the southwest. According to the Syria Central Bureau of Statistics (CBS), Taybat al-Imam had a population of 24,105 in the 2004 census.

== History ==
The town was formerly known as 'Tayyibat al-A'la' (طيبة الأعلى). Between 1786 and 1799, during Ottoman rule (1516–1918), Tayyibat al-A'la was part of a lifetime leasehold of Muhammad Effendi al-Muradi, the secretary of the diwan of Damascus. In an 1828 Ottoman tax record, Tayyibat al-A'la was classified as a grain-growing village consisting of 65 feddans, making it one of the larger villages of the Hama Sanjak. In 1838, it was recorded a Sunni Muslim village.

The name of the town gained its appendage 'al-Imam' at a later point after a tomb-shrine located there which locals ascribed to a descendant of the Imam, Ali ibn Abi Talib.

=== Syrian civil war ===
During the Syrian civil war, Taybat al-Imam was the scene of violent clashes between the rebel Free Syrian Army and the government's armed forces in December 2012. The clashes were part of a rebel offensive into Hama Governorate. In August 2016, rebels managed to recapture the city. On 20 April 2017, Syrian Army recaptured the city from HTS rebels.

On 30 November 2024, HTS rebels captured the city from the Syrian Army during the Hama offensive. A day later, the Syrian Army recaptured the city from HTS rebels. On 3 December, HTS regained control over the city.

== Church of the Holy Martyrs ==
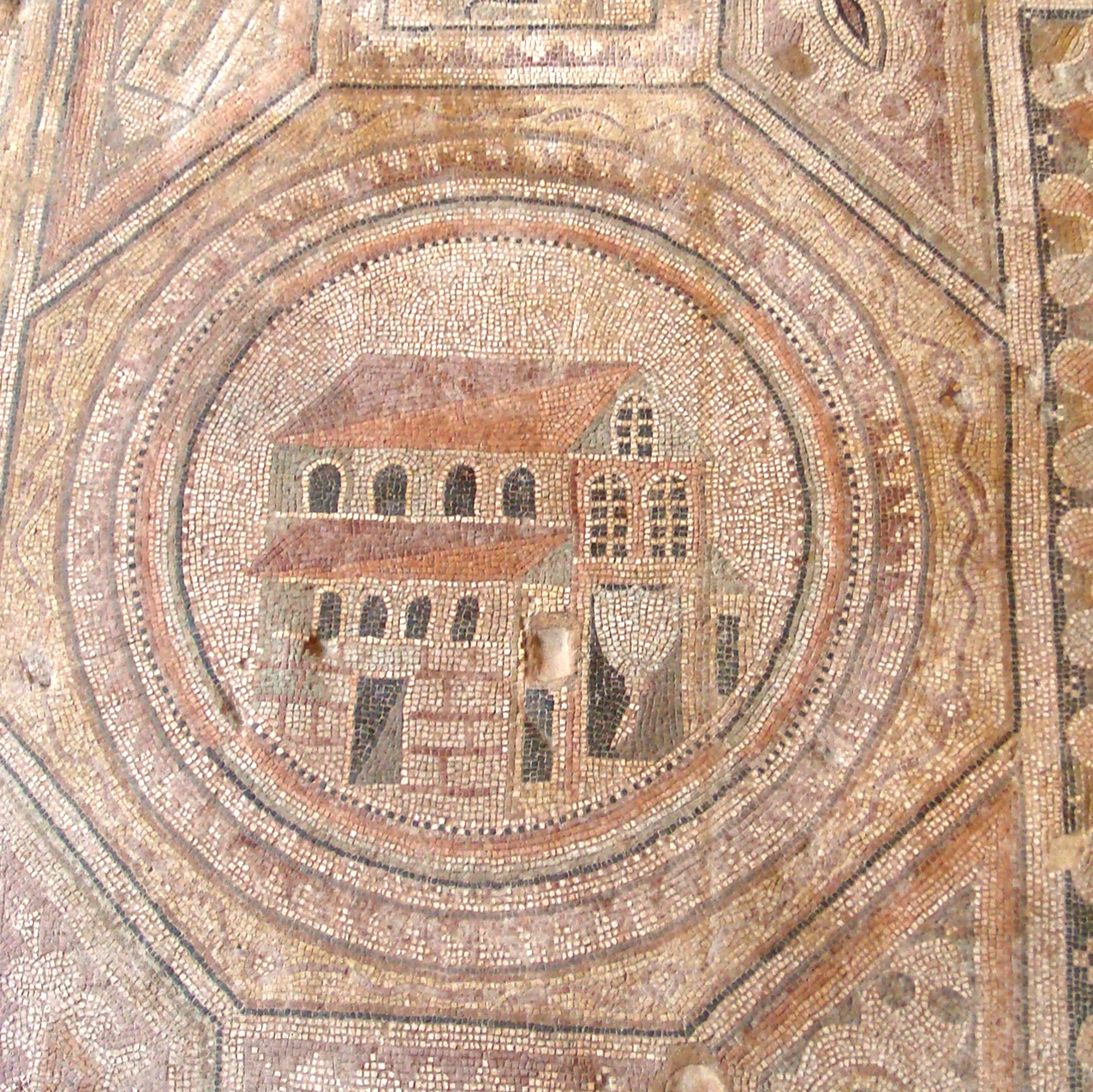
Mosaic Taybat al-Imam detail

Taybat al-Imam contains the Byzantine-era Church of the Holy Martyrs that dates back to 442 CE. The church, which now serves as a museum in the center of town, consists of three naves and contains a large mosaic covering the building's entire floor. The mosaic was accidentally discovered in 1985 during road construction in the town. Between that year and 1987 it was excavated by the Jordan-based Franciscan Archaeological Institute. The mosaic is noted for both its size and for its depiction of 20 different building types, including religious and civil structures. Other images depicted include the scene of Paradise, the Tigris and Euphrates rivers, the churches of Jerusalem and Bethlehem, the basilica of St. Simeon Stylites and the double towers of Qalb Lozeh, both sites in northern Syria near Aleppo.

== See also ==
- Early Byzantine mosaics in the Middle East
- Michele Piccirillo (1944–2008), Franciscan archaeologist involved in building a shelter over the Byzantine church ruins

== Notable people ==
- Ali Noureddine al-Naasan (*1970), Chief of the General Staff of the Syrian Army since 2024

== Bibliography ==
- Robinson, E.; Smith, E. (1841). Biblical Researches in Palestine, Mount Sinai and Arabia Petraea: A Journal of Travels in the year 1838. Vol. 3. Boston: Crocker & Brewster.
- Darke, Diane (2010). Syria, 2nd edition. Bradt Travel Guides. ISBN 9781841623146.
- Douwes, Dick (2000). The Ottomans in Syria: A History of Justice and Oppression. I.B. Tauris. ISBN 1860640311.
- Hachlili, Rachel (2009). Ancient Mosaic Pavements: Themes, Issues, and Trends. BRILL. ISBN 9789004167544.
