= Jubb Ramlah =

Jubb Ramlah جب رملة Jub Ramleh
- Town
- Location in Syria
- Coordinates: 35°12′33″N 36°25′49″E
- Country: Syria
- Governorate: Hama
- District: Masyaf
- Subdistrict: Jubb Ramlah

Population (2004)
  - Total: 3,329
- Time zone: UTC+3 (AST)

Jubb Ramlah (Arabic: جب رملة, also spelled Jub Ramleh) is a village in northwestern Syria, administratively part of the Hama Governorate, located west of Hama. Nearby localities include Deir Shamil to the west, Tell Salhab to the north, Safsafiyah to the northeast and Asilah to the east. According to the Central Bureau of Statistics (CBS), Jubb Ramlah had a population of 3,329 in the 2004 census.
