= Karnaz =

Karnaz كرناز
- Town
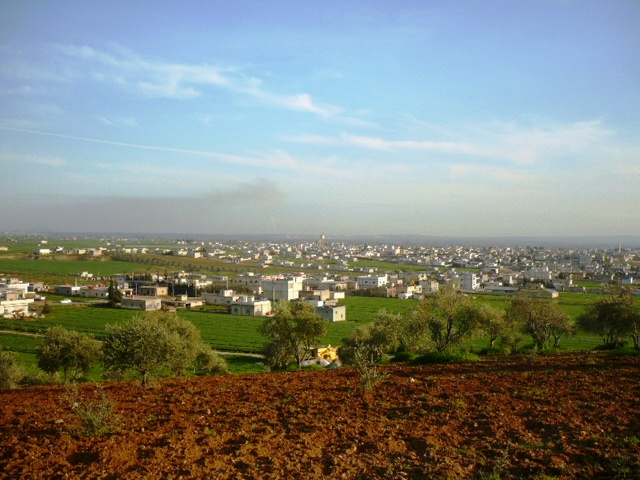
- General view of Karnaz

- Location in Syria
- Coordinates: 35.389618°N 36.486657°E
- Country: Syria
- Governorate: Hama
- District: Mahardah
- Subdistrict: Karnaz

Population (2004)
  - Total: 14,075
  - Ethnicities: Syrians
- Time zone: UTC+3 (AST)

Karnaz (Arabic: كرناز Syriac ܟܪܢܵܫْܹܐ, Kirnaz or Kernaz) modified from Kafr Naz ܟܦܪ ܐܢܵܫْܹܐ, is a town in northern Syria, administratively part of the Hama Governorate, located northwest of Hama, its elevation rang is 220-240 meter. Nearby localities include Kafr Zita and Khan Shaykhun to the east, Kafr Nabudah to the north, Qalaat al-Madiq and al-Suqaylabiyah to the west and Kafr Hud, Tremseh, and Shaizar to the south.

According to the Syria Central Bureau of Statistics, Karnaz had a population of 14,075 in the 2004 census. Its inhabitants are predominantly Sunni Muslims. People of Karnaz are known for openness and coexistence with other groups in Syrian society. They are living in harmony with other nearby Christian villages like al-Suqaylabiyah and Mhardeh, as well as with nearby Alawite villages like Hurat Ammurin, Ein Elkorum and Tell Salhab to the west. This feature stands despite the complications of the Civil War after 2012.

== Etymology ==
Karnazes is modified from Kafr Naz or Kafrnaz (also spelled Kfar Naz), likewise many villages in the area: Kafr ܟܦܪ is a Syriac word which means "farm" or small "village". The second part Naz is probably derived from the root nasheh ܐܢܵܫْܹܐ, which means either irrigated land or people. That coincides with the existence of an intermittent river that crosses the village. So, Karnaz means the irrigated village. Kurnaz is another spelling in some local dialects, and Kur is a Syriac word which means local, so Kurnaz means local people.

== Syrian Civil War ==
During the Syrian Civil War, rebel forces had controlled the town until early February 2013, when Syrian Army and pro-government forces surrounded the town from the west and south. On February 8, 2013, government and rebel sources confirmed the battle ended with the withdrawal of rebel forces. Later on March 14, 2018, rebel forces launched an offensive on the city along with Hamamiyat and Magha'ir. This offensive is known as the Anger for Ghouta campaign. Rebel forces captured all 3 towns and surrounding areas. The government in response launched several airstrikes at the city and recapture it later that day.

On 18 September 2018, to avoid a possible attack of the government forces on Idlib and possible consequences on civilians, and to avoid a possible refugees stream, Russia and Turkey made an agreement to create a buffer zone of about 15–20 kilometres (9.3–12.4 mi) around Idlib. Karnaz is located in the Russian observed part of the buffer zone.

From June 2019 to November 2024, it was controlled by the Syrian Army. On 30 November 2024, HTS rebels captured the city from the Syrian Army during the Hama offensive. Two days later, on 2 December, it was recaptured by HTS following a Syrian Army counter-attack.

== Bibliography ==
- Robinson, E.; Smith, E. (1841). Biblical Researches in Palestine, Mount Sinai and Arabia Petraea: A Journal of Travels in the year 1838. Vol. 3. Boston: Crocker & Brewster.
