= Maharda =

City in northern Syria

Maharda محردة Maharda, Mahardah, Muharda, Mharada, Mahardeh, Muhardeh, Mhardeh, Mharda
- City
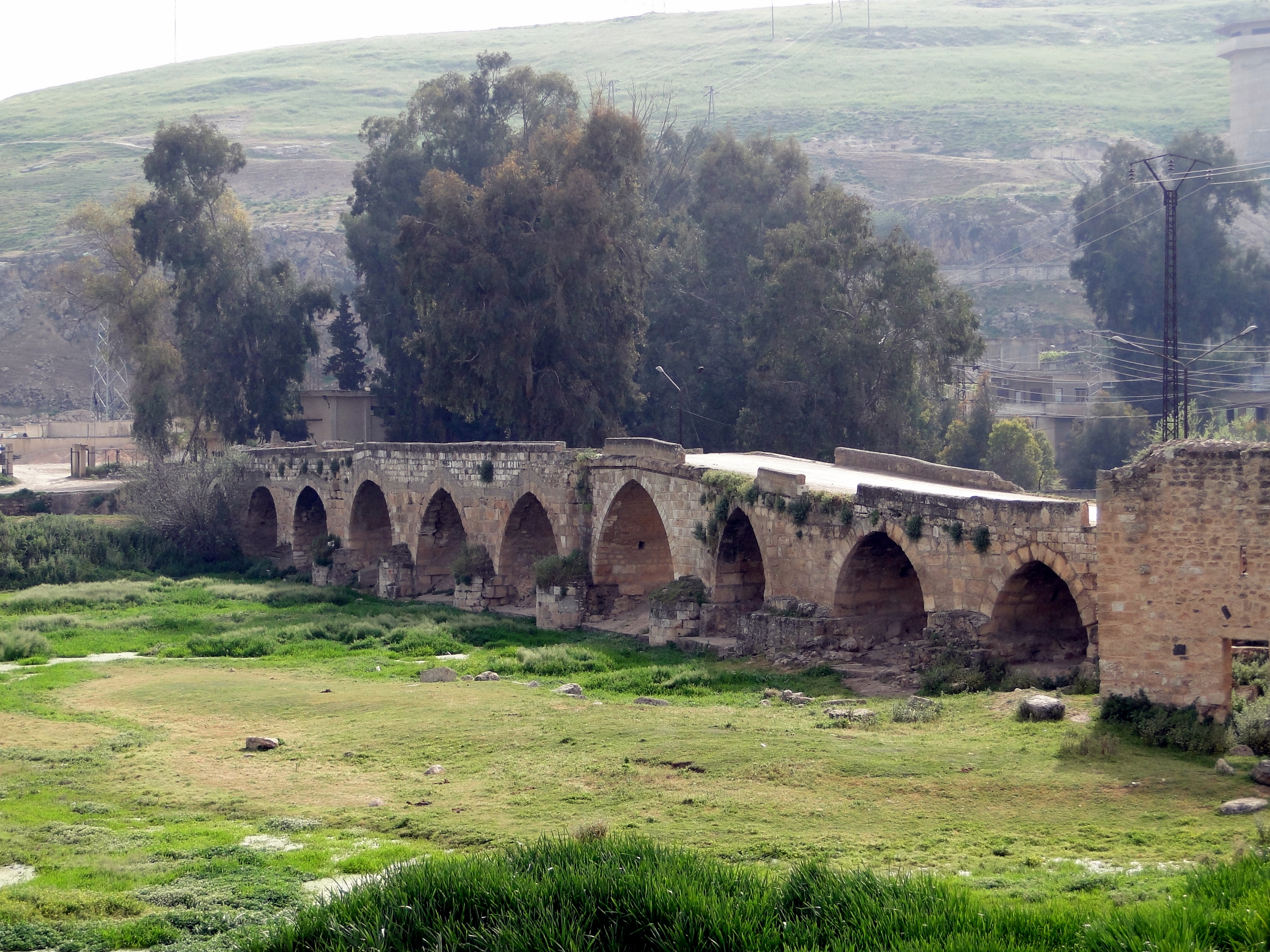
- Ancient Roman bridge in Maharda

- Location in Syria
- Coordinates: 35°15′N 36°35′E
- Country: Syria
- Governorate: Hama
- District: Mahardah
- Subdistrict: Mahardah
- Elevation: 280 m (920 ft)

Population (2004)
  - Total: 17,578
- Time zone: UTC+3 (AST)

Maharda (Arabic: محردة, romanized: Mḥarda, IPA: [maˈħarda]; also transliterated Mhardeh, Muhardah, Mahardah or Mharda) is a Christian city in western Syria, administratively part of the Hama Governorate, located about 23 kilometers northwest of Hama. It is situated along the Orontes River, near the Ghab Plain. Nearby localities include Halfaya and Taybat al-Imam to the east, Khitab to the southeast, Maarzaf to the south, Asilah and Jubb Ramlah to the southwest, Shaizar, Safsafiyah, Tremseh and Kafr Hud to the west and Kafr Zita and al-Lataminah to the north.

According to the Syria Central Bureau of Statistics (CBS), Maharda had a population of 17,578 in the 2004 census. It is the center of Mahardah District, one of the Hama Governorate's five districts, and the nahiyah ("subdistrict") of Maharda, which contained 21 localities with a combined population of 80,165 in 2004. Maharda's population was estimated to be 22,442 in 2010. Its inhabitants are predominantly Christians of the Greek Orthodox Church.

The Orontes River was dammed 3 kilometers north, and the Mahardah Dam on the Ghab Plain is used to generate hydroelectric power.

== History ==
The numerous Christian ruins in the village attest to an ancient Christian presence in Maharda. Maharda's inhabitants claim descent from the Ghassanids, a prominent Arab Christian tribe from the Byzantine era. Along with al-Suqaylabiyah and Kafr Buhum, it is one of the few Greek Orthodox, Arab Christian localities in the Hama region.

=== Ottoman period ===
In the 16th century, during Ottoman rule (1516–1918), Maharda was the metropolitan seat of a diocese called 'Euchaita', spanning the Christian villages of the countryside between Hama and Homs. The affiliated Christian villages were Kafr Buhum, Bsirin, Albiyya, Hanak, Ma'alta and Afiyun. In the early 16th century, Maharda had a population of 4,000, according to an anecdotal account by Patriarch Macarius III Ibn al-Za'im (r. 1647–1672), a native of the Hama region. The second-to-last metropolitan of Euchaita, Gregorius al-Hamawi, a native of Maharda, ordained 35 priests and 14 deacons. After the death of his successor, Malachi, in 1596 or 1597, Euchaita was dissolved and its diocese was split between those of Hama and Homs, with Maharda assigned to the former.

In 1728, the Christians of Maharda, represented by their chief, were indebted over 5,000 piasters to a moneylender in Hama, Husayn Effendi al-Kaylani. Part of the sum was to help cover jizya (poll tax on Christians) payments to the government. In an 1828 or 1829 tax record, the village consisted of 46 feddans and paid 4,730 akce (450 of which was jizya) to the government treasury, as well as the relatively high sum of 13,250 akce to the mutasallim (local governor) of Hama, Faraj Agha, which the government later determined was an illicit collection by the mutasallim. The village was recorded as a Greek Orthodox Christian village in 1838.

In the Monastery of St. George in Maharda, whose date of construction is not known, the oldest manuscript there dates to the late 19th century. In 1882 the American Presbyterian church opened a school in Maharda, which the Ottoman governor of Syria closed in 1906 citing the lack of a permit. Numerous emigrants from Maharda left the village in the aftermath of World War I, when the Ottomans were driven from Syria by British-backed forces.

=== Post-Syrian independence ===
In the early 1960s, Maharda was described as "a large Christian village where the houses lie in terraces amid the vines". Maharda historically benefited from its location in a rich agricultural region, its close proximity (2 kilometers (1.2 mi)) to the strategic medieval citadel of Shaizar, and the large landed estates of its residents. The lands expropriated from Maharda alone by the state constituted a proportionally considerable 0.8% of all lands expropriated in the Hama Governorate in the late 1950s and early 1960s. Employment and businesses in the town benefited from the construction of the Maharda Dam in 1957–1963 and a few years later by the construction of the associated hydroelectric station. Many emigrants returned to Maharda during this period, investing their capital there, opening new services and artisanal businesses, and introducing technology like motor pumps, which stimulated agricultural production.

Many of the villages around Maharda were large, effectively small towns, such as Kafr Zita, Karnaz, Halfaya and al-Lataminah, and maintained close commercial ties with Maharda as the chief town and nahiya (subdistrict) center of the area. In 1975, Maharda's status was further solidified when it was formally recognized as a city and made the capital of the new Mahardah District. The distinctive urban character, wide variety of businesses and the 'elegance' of its young women had earned Maharda the nickname of 'little Paris' among the city dwellers of Hama by the 1980s, according to historians Jean and Françoise Métral. Outside of the governorate capitals of Hama and Homs and the major district capital of Salamiyah, Maharda was the only city in central Syria to command its own zone of influence, at least as of the mid-1990s.

==== Syrian civil war ====
During the Syrian Civil War, Maharda has been targeted by rebels, yet remained under government control. Between 2011 and 2018, 97 civilians were killed in rebel attacks on the town. According to pro-government media, the rate of attacks on Maharda increased during the course of the 2017 Hama offensive.

== Notable people ==
- Ignatius IV of Antioch (1920–2012), Patriarch of the Greek Orthodox Church of Antioch and All The East from 1979 to 2012.
- Ghada Shouaa, (born 1972) heptathlete and Syria's only Olympic gold medal winner.

== See also ==
- Cities and towns during the Syrian civil war

== Bibliography ==
- Al-Dbiyat, Mohammed (1995). Homs et Hama en Syrie centrale: Concurrence urbaine et développement régional (in French). Presses de l’Ifpo. ISBN 2-901315-26-7.
- Boulanger, Robert (1966). The Middle East: Lebanon, Syria, Jordan, Iraq, Iran. Libraire Hachette.
- Douwes, Dick (2000). The Ottomans in Syria: A History of Justice and Oppression. I.B. Tauris. ISBN 1860640311.
- Panchenko, Constantin Alexandrovich (2016). Arab Orthodox Christians Under the Ottomans 1516–1831. Holy Trinity Publications. ISBN 978-1-942699-10-1.
- Reilly, James A. (2002). A Small Town in Syria: Ottoman Hama in the Eighteenth and Nineteenth Centuries. Peter Lang. ISBN 3-906766-90-X.
- Robinson, E.; Smith, E. (1841). Biblical Researches in Palestine, Mount Sinai and Arabia Petraea: A Journal of Travels in the year 1838. Vol. 3. Boston: Crocker & Brewster.
- United States - Department of State (1909). Papers Relating to the Foreign Relations of the United States, Part 2. Washington, D.C.: Government Printing Office.
