= Khunayzir =

Khunayzir (alternatively transliterated Khneizir or Khuneizir) may refer to the following places:

- Khunayzir, Palestine, deppopulated Palestinian village and/or Arab tribe in the Beisan Subdistrict
- Khunayzir, Syria, Syrian village in the Hama Governorate
