= Deir Shamil =

Deir Shmaeil دير شميَل Deir el-Shemil
- Village
- Location in Syria
- Coordinates: 35°12′38″N 36°20′35″E
- Country: Syria
- Governorate: Hama
- District: Masyaf
- Subdistrict: Jubb Ramlah

Population (2004)
  - Total: 4,537
- Time zone: UTC+3 (AST)

Deir Shamil (Arabic: دير شميل, also spelled Deir el-Shemil) is a village in northwestern Syria, administratively part of the Hama Governorate, located west of Hama. Nearby localities include Nahr al-Bared to the north, Tell Salhab to the northeast, Jubb Ramlah to the east, al-Laqbah and Deir Mama to the south and Daliyah to the west. According to the Central Bureau of Statistics (CBS), Deir Shamil had a population of 4,537 in the 2004 census. Its inhabitants are predominantly Alawites.

In the early 1960s it was described as a large village of 600 inhabitants. It contained the remains of an Ottoman-era seraglio.

== Syrian Civil War ==
On 23 June 2023, a woman was killed and a number of others were killed after a drone attack on the regime held village by opposition factions.

== Bibliography ==
- Boulanger, Robert (1966). The Middle East, Lebanon, Syria, Jordan, Iraq, Iran. Hachette.
- Smith, Eli; Robinson, Edward (1841). Biblical Researches in Palestine, Mount Sinai and Arabia Petraea: A Journal of Travels in the Year 1838. Vol. 3. Crocker and Brewster.
