= Halfaya =

Halfaya حلفايا Helfaya
- City
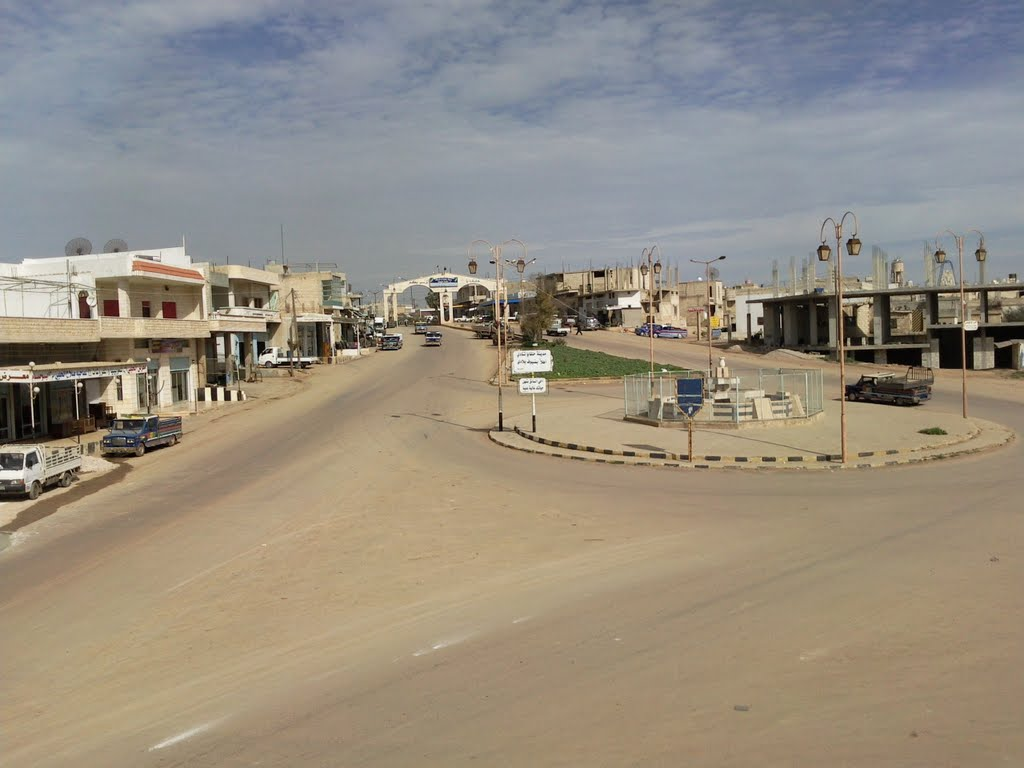

- Location in Syria
- Coordinates: 35°15′41″N 36°36′15″E
- Country: Syria
- Governorate: Hama
- District: Mahardah
- Subdistrict: Mahardah

Population (2004)
  - Total: 21,180
- Time zone: UTC+3 (AST)

Halfaya (Arabic: حلفايا, also spelled Helfaya) is a City in northern Syria, administratively part of the Hama Governorate, located about 25 kilometers northwest of Hama. Nearby localities include Mahardah and Shaizar to the west, al-Lataminah and Kafr Zita to the north, Taybat al-Imam and Suran to the east, Khitab and Qamhana to the southeast, Tayzin to the south and Maarzaf to the southeast. According to the Syria Central Bureau of Statistics (CBS), Halfaya had a population of 21,180 in the 2004 census. It is the largest locality in the Mahardah Subdistrict, which contained 21 localities with a combined population of 80,165 in 2004.

== History ==
In 1838, Halfaya was classified by scholar Eli Smith as a Sunni Muslim village.

In the early French Mandate period in Syria, Halfaya was a musha' ("collective farming") village with a population of roughly 1,000. During that period, twelve clans collectively held the 47 faddans that made up the village, despite the fact that property titles indicated that the land was divided between the holders.

On 16 December 2012, during the Syrian civil war that began in early 2011, opposition rebels assaulted Syrian Army checkpoints in the vicinity and Halfaya was shelled by government forces. The fighting and shelling resulted in the deaths of 23 civilians in the town according to the pro-opposition Syrian Observatory for Human Rights (SOHR), and a later report by New Lines Institute. By 18 December rebels reportedly overran army positions around Halfaya and gained control over the town. Rebels had advanced 40 kilometres (25 mi) south from Maarrat al-Nu'man and Jisr ash-Shugour, encountering little resistance. On 23 December government airstrikes hit a bakery in Halfaya while several people were queuing for bread. According to anti-government activists at least 90 people were killed, while fatalities have also been reported to be as high as 200.

On 19 May 2013, the Syrian Army took control of Halfaya after rebel forces retreated from the town. In late August 2014, the rebels took control of Halfaya as part of their push towards Hama's military airport. The army recaptured it at a later date, but the rebels again took it in August 2016. The town was then recaptured by the SAA in April 2017.

On 30 November 2024 during the Hama offensive, Hay'at Tahrir al-Sham (HTS) rebels captured the city from the Syrian Army but were repulsed not long afterward. On 3 December, HTS regained control over the city.

== Notable people ==
- Murhaf Abu Qasra (*1984), Minister of Defense since 21 December 2024

== Bibliography ==
- Owen, Roger; Bunton, Marin P. (2000). New Perspectives on Property and Land in the Middle East. Harvard CMES. ISBN 0932885268.
- Robinson, E.; Smith, E. (1841). Biblical Researches in Palestine, Mount Sinai and Arabia Petraea: A Journal of Travels in the year 1838. Vol. 3. Boston: Crocker & Brewster.
