= Maradash =

Maradash مرداش Mirdash
- Village
- Location in Syria
- Coordinates: 35°27′N 36°15′E
- Country: Syria
- Governorate: Hama
- District: Al-Suqaylabiyah District
- Subdistrict: Shathah Subdistrict

Population (2004)
  - Total: 1,899
- Time zone: UTC+3 (AST)
- City Qrya Pcode: C3181

Maradash (Arabic: مرداش, also spelled Mirdash) is a Syrian village located in Shathah Subdistrict in Al-Suqaylabiyah District, Hama. According to the Syria Central Bureau of Statistics (CBS), Maradesh had a population of 1,899 in the 2004 census. It had a population of 600 in the early 1960s. Its inhabitants are predominantly Alawites.

== Bibliography ==
- Boulanger, Robert (1966). The Middle East, Lebanon, Syria, Jordan, Iraq, Iran. Hachette.
