= Jamasat Udayat =

Jamasat Udayat جماسة عديات Al-Shari'ah
- Village
- Location in Syria
- Coordinates: 35°26′47″N 36°21′17″E
- Country: Syria
- Governorate: Hama
- District: Suqaylabiyah
- Subdistrict: Qalaat al-Madiq

Population (2004)
  - Total: 8,337
- Time zone: UTC+3 (AST)
- City Qrya Pcode: C3193

Jamasat Udayat (Arabic: جماسة عديات, also known as al-Shari'ah) is a large village in northern Syria located in the Qalaat al-Madiq Subdistrict of the al-Suqaylabiyah District in Hama Governorate. According to the Syria Central Bureau of Statistics (CBS), Jamasat Udayat had a population of 8,337 in the 2004 census. Its inhabitants are predominantly Sunni Muslims.
