= Al-Rastan Dam =

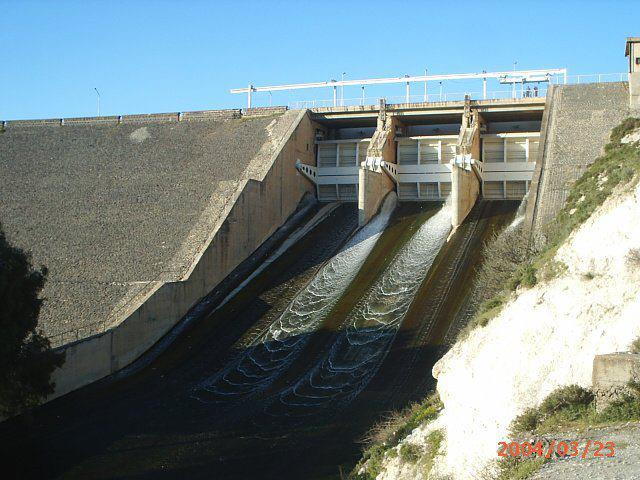

- Location within Syria
- Country: Syria
- Location: Al-Rastan, Homs Governorate
- Coordinates: 34°56′18.32″N 36°44′03.36″E
- Purpose: Irrigation
- Status: Operational
- Opening date: around 1975

Dam and spillways
- Impounds: Orontes River
- Height: 67 m (220 ft)

Reservoir
- Total capacity: 228,000,000 m^{3} (185,000 acre⋅ft)
- Surface area: 21 km^{2} (8.1 mi^{2})

Al-Rastan Dam is an embankment dam on the Orontes River in the city of Al-Rastan, Homs Governorate, Syria. It was completed around 1975 with the primary purpose of water storage for irrigation. It was constructed by the Bulgarian firm Hydrostroy along with the Mouhardeh Dam, which is downstream and also on the Orontes.

== See also ==
- Lake Homs Dam – located upstream
