= Al-Asharinah =

Al-Asharinah العشارنة Asharneh
- Village
- Location in Syria
- Coordinates: 35°17′25″N 36°23′59″E
- Country: Syria
- Governorate: Hama
- District: Suqaylabiyah
- Subdistrict: Tell Salhab

Population (2004)
  - Total: 6,347
- Time zone: UTC+3 (AST)
- City Qrya Pcode: C3140

Al-Asharinah (Arabic: العشارنة) is a Syrian village located in the Tell Salhab Subdistrict of the al-Suqaylabiyah District in Hama Governorate. According to the Syria Central Bureau of Statistics (CBS), al-Asharinah had a population of 6,347 in the 2004 census. Its inhabitants are predominantly Sunni Muslims. During the Syrian Civil War the residents of the town were displaced by the Syrian government and resettled by Alawites who had been driven out of the Ishtabraq village near Idlib.

== Bibliography ==
- Robinson, E.; Smith, E. (1841). Biblical Researches in Palestine, Mount Sinai and Arabia Petraea: A Journal of Travels in the year 1838. Vol. 3. Boston: Crocker & Brewster.
