= Arnaba =

Coordinates: 35.7017°N 36.4639°E

Arnaba ارنبة
- Village
- Location in Syria
- Country: Syria
- Governorate: Idlib
- District: Ariha District
- Subdistrict: Ihsim Nahiyah

Population (2004)
  - Total: 1,376
- Time zone: UTC+2 (EET)
  - Summer (DST): UTC+3 (EEST)
- City Qrya Pcode: C4301

Arnaba (Arabic: ارنبة) is a Syrian village located in Ihsim Nahiyah in Ariha District, Idlib. According to the Syria Central Bureau of Statistics (CBS), Arnaba had a population of 1376 in the 2004 census.
