= Tell Salhab =

Salhab سلحب Salhab
- City
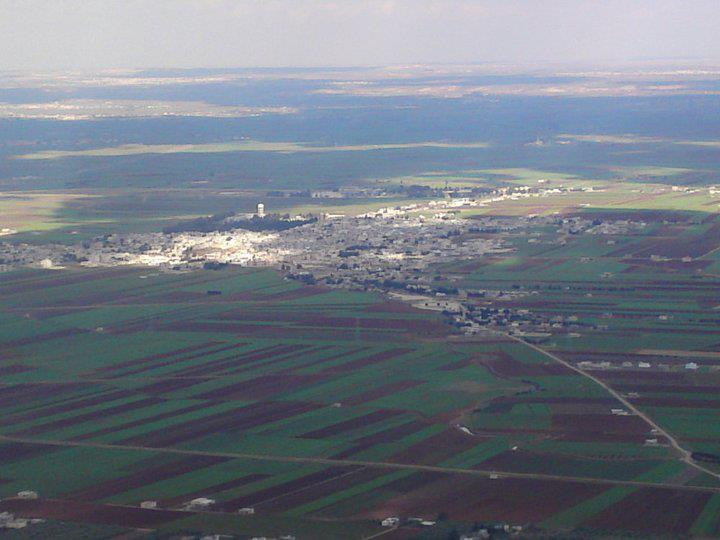
- Salhab, in 2014

- Location in Syria
- Coordinates: 35.26089°N 36.382223°E
- Country: Syria
- Governorate: Hama
- District: Al-Suqaylabiyah
- Subdistrict: Tell Salhab

Population (2004)
  - Total: 15,454
- Time zone: UTC+3 (AST)

Salhab (Arabic: سلحب, also spelled Tall Salhab) is a City in the western center of Syria, administratively part of the Hama Governorate, located 48 kilometres (30 mi) northwest of Hama. It is situated on the southern edge of the Ghab Plain and by the western bank of the Orontes River. Nearby localities include Nahr al-Bared, Al-Asharinah and al-Suqaylabiyah to the north, Deir Shamil and Deir Mama to the south, Tremseh, Mhardeh and Halfaya to the east.

According to the Syria Central Bureau of Statistics, Salhab had a population of 15,454 in the 2004 census. It is also the center of Salhab Subdistrict, part of the Al-Suqaylabiyah District, consisting of 18 localities and with a combined population of 38,783 in 2004. In the early 1960s its population was around 700. Its inhabitants are predominantly Alawites.

The City was the traditional seat of the Jnaid clan, which typically provided the leaders of the Alawite Kalbiyya confederation. In 1978 a 5,200 square metres (56,000 sq ft) sugar refinery was built in Salhab at a cost of $50 million. The refinery complex boasted a sugar beet silo, a washing plant, pulp presses and dryers, and a water reservoir.

== Archaeological excavations ==
Near Salhab is located Tell 'Acharneh, a large mound which is believed to be the location of the ancient city of Tunip. Archaeological excavations have been ongoing at the site.
