= Mahardah Dam =

- Location within Syria
- Country: Syria
- Location: Mahardah, Hama Governorate
- Coordinates: 35°16′06.33″N 36°34′37.24″E
- Purpose: Irrigation
- Status: Operational
- Opening date: 1960

Dam and spillways
- Impounds: Orontes River
- Height: 41 m (135 ft)

Reservoir
- Total capacity: 67,000,000 m^{3} (54,000 acre⋅ft)
- Surface area: 4.5 km^{2} (1.7 mi^{2})

The Mahardah Dam, also spelled Mhardeh Dam, is an embankment dam on the Orontes River in the city of Mahardah, Hama Governorate, Syria. It was completed in 1960 with the primary purpose of irrigation and a capacity of 54,000 acre feet. It was constructed by the Bulgarian firm Hydrostroy along with the al-Rastan Dam, which is upstream and also on the Orontes.
