= Khunayzir, Syria =

Khunayzir خنيزير Khneizir
- Village
- Location in Syria
- Coordinates: 35°14′54″N 36°31′47″E
- Country: Syria
- Governorate: Hama
- District: Mahardah
- Subdistrict: Mahardah

Population (2004)
  - Total: 2,716
- Time zone: UTC+3 (AST)
- City Qrya Pcode: C3451

Khunayzir (Arabic: خنيزير) is a Syrian village located in the Mahardah Subdistrict of the Mahardah District in Hama Governorate. According to the Syria Central Bureau of Statistics (CBS), Khunayzir had a population of 2,716 in the 2004 census.
