= Morek =

Town in central Syria

Morek مورك Murak, Murik
- Town
- Location in Syria
- Coordinates: 35°22′31″N 36°41′14″E
- Country: Syria
- Governorate: Hama
- District: Hama
- Subdistrict: Suran

Population (2004)
  - Total: 14,307
- Time zone: UTC+3 (AST)
- City Qrya Pcode: C3029

Morek (Arabic: مورك, romanized: Mūrik, also spelled Murik, Mork, or Murak) is a town in central Syria, administratively part of the Suran Subdistrict of Hama District, about 25 kilometers (16 mi) northeast of Hama city. It is located on the M5 highway, which connects Hama with Aleppo.

According to the Syria Central Bureau of Statistics (CBS), Morek had a population of 14,307 in the 2004 census. Its inhabitants are Sunni Muslims. Morek is the center of the country's pistachio production.

== History ==
Murik contains the ruins, including mosaics, of a 5th-century Byzantine church, similar to those found in nearby Qamhana and Taybet al-Imam.

=== Ottoman period ===
In 1818, due to the impoverished state of its inhabitants, Morek was partially exempted from taxes. In a tax record from that year, the village consisted of 23 feddans, paid the relatively small amount of 1,100 qirsh in taxes but also was extorted to pay 4,720 qirsh by the mutasallim of Hama, Faraj Agha, who was dismissed from his post for corrupt practices.

In 1838, its inhabitants were noted to be predominantly Sunni Muslims. In May 1841, amid the chaotic withdrawal of Egyptian forces from Syria, which they had controlled since 1831, Bedouins from the Anaza tribes of Fad'an and Sba'a raided Morek, kidnapping a boy and stealing numerous livestock from the inhabitants.

=== French Mandatory period ===
In the early 20th century, during French Mandatory rule, Morek's 300 small landowners were split between two disputing factions. They sought arbitration from the notables of Hama city, who thereupon took ownership of two-thirds of the village's lands. The inhabitants of Morek were Sunni Muslim Arabs of Bedouin origin.

=== Syrian civil war ===
During the Syrian civil war, the city was the site of the Battle of Morek. By 2018 it was under the control of Hayat Tahrir al Sham and had become the sight of an important crossing point from rebel held areas into those held by the Syrian government. On August 12, 2018, the Syrian Arab Army closed that crossing in preparation for their assault on rebel held territory in the region. The Turkish government had also deployed special forces to Morek in preparation for the SAA's anticipated advance on the Idlib region. The anticipated advance was averted by a de-militarization agreement signed between Russia and Turkey in September 2018. By May 2019 a group called Jaysh al-Izza was stationed in the city and was refusing to allow Russian patrols within the demilitarized zone.

On 20 August, the Syrian Observatory for Human Rights reported that the rebel and Islamic factions including jihadi groups like Hayat Tahrir al-Sham (HTS) had completely withdrawn from Morek in the northern countryside of Hama. Turkish Foreign Minister Mevlüt Çavuşoğlu said that the Turkish troops were staying at the Turkish observation post in Morek.

Turkey withdrew its military presence from Morek on 19 October 2020. On 30 November 2024, HTS rebels captured the city from the Syrian Army during the Hama offensive.

== Bibliography ==
- Comité de l'Asie française (April 1933). "Notes sur la propriété foncière dans le Syrie centrale (Notes on Landownership in Central Syria)". Bulletin du Comité de l'Asie française (in French). 33 (309). Comité de l'Asie française: 130–136.
- Douwes, Dick; Lewis, Norman N. (1992). "Taxation and Agriculture in the Hama District, 1800–1831: New Material from the Records of the Religious Court". In Philipp, Thomas (ed.). The Syrian Land in the 18th and 19th Centuries. Stuttgart: Franz Steiner. pp. 261–284. ISBN 3-515-05685-8.
- Douwes, Dick (2000). The Ottomans in Syria: A History of Justice and Oppression. I.B. Tauris. ISBN 1860640311.
- Jouejati-Madwar, Rafah (2005). "A Mosaicists' Workshop in Epiphania (Hama, Syria) at the Beginning of the 5th Century". La mosaïque gréco-romaine. IX–Colloque international pour l'étude de la mosaïque antique (9th: 2001: Rome, Italy) Volume 2. Rome: École Française de Rome. pp. 775–784.
- Robinson, E.; Smith, E. (1841). Biblical Researches in Palestine, Mount Sinai and Arabia Petraea: A Journal of Travels in the year 1838. Vol. 3. Boston: Crocker & Brewster.
