= Kafr Hud =

Kafr Hud كفر هود
- Town
- Location in Syria
- Coordinates: 35°17′2″N 36°30′36″E
- Country: Syria
- Governorate: Hama
- District: Mahardah
- Subdistrict: Mahardah

Population (2004)
  - Total: 2,736
- Time zone: UTC+3 (AST)
- City Qrya Pcode: C3455

Kafr Hud (Arabic: كفر هود) is a Syrian town located in the Mahardah Subdistrict of the Mahardah District in Hama Governorate. According to the Syria Central Bureau of Statistics (CBS), Kafr Hud had a population of 2,736 in the 2004 census. Its inhabitants are predominantly Sunni Muslims.

== Bibliography ==
- Robinson, E.; Smith, E. (1841). Biblical Researches in Palestine, Mount Sinai and Arabia Petraea: A Journal of Travels in the year 1838. Vol. 3. Boston: Crocker & Brewster.
