= Karnaz Subdistrict =

Karnaz Subdistrict ناحية كرناز
- Subdistrict (nahiyah)
- Location in Hama Governorate

- Location in Syria
- Country: Syria
- Governorate: Hama
- District: Mhardeh District
- Capital: Karnaz

Population (2004)
  - Total: 25,039
- Time zone: UTC+2 (EET)
  - Summer (DST): UTC+3 (EEST)
- Nahya pcod: SY050502

Karnaz Subdistrict (Arabic: ناحية كرناز) is a subdistrict (nahiya) of the Mhardeh District in Hama. The center of this subdistrict is Karnaz. According to the Syria Central Bureau of Statistics (CBS), the Karnaz Subdistrict had a population of 25,039 in the 2004 census.
