= Safsafiyah =

Safsafiyah صفصافية Sifsafiyeh
- Village
- Location in Syria
- Coordinates: 35°15′46″N 36°28′40″E
- Country: Syria
- Governorate: Hama
- District: Mahardah
- Subdistrict: Mahardah

Population (2004)
  - Total: 5,062
- Time zone: UTC+3 (AST)
- City Qrya Pcode: C3440

Safsafiyah (Arabic: صفصافية) is a Syrian village located in the Mahardah Subdistrict of the Mahardah District in Hama Governorate. According to the Syria Central Bureau of Statistics (CBS), Safsafiyah had a population of 5,062 in the 2004 census. It is a mixed village inhabited by both Alawites and Sunni Bedouin.
