= Ghab Plain =

Area of the al-Suqaylabiyah District in western Syria

- Fertile depression
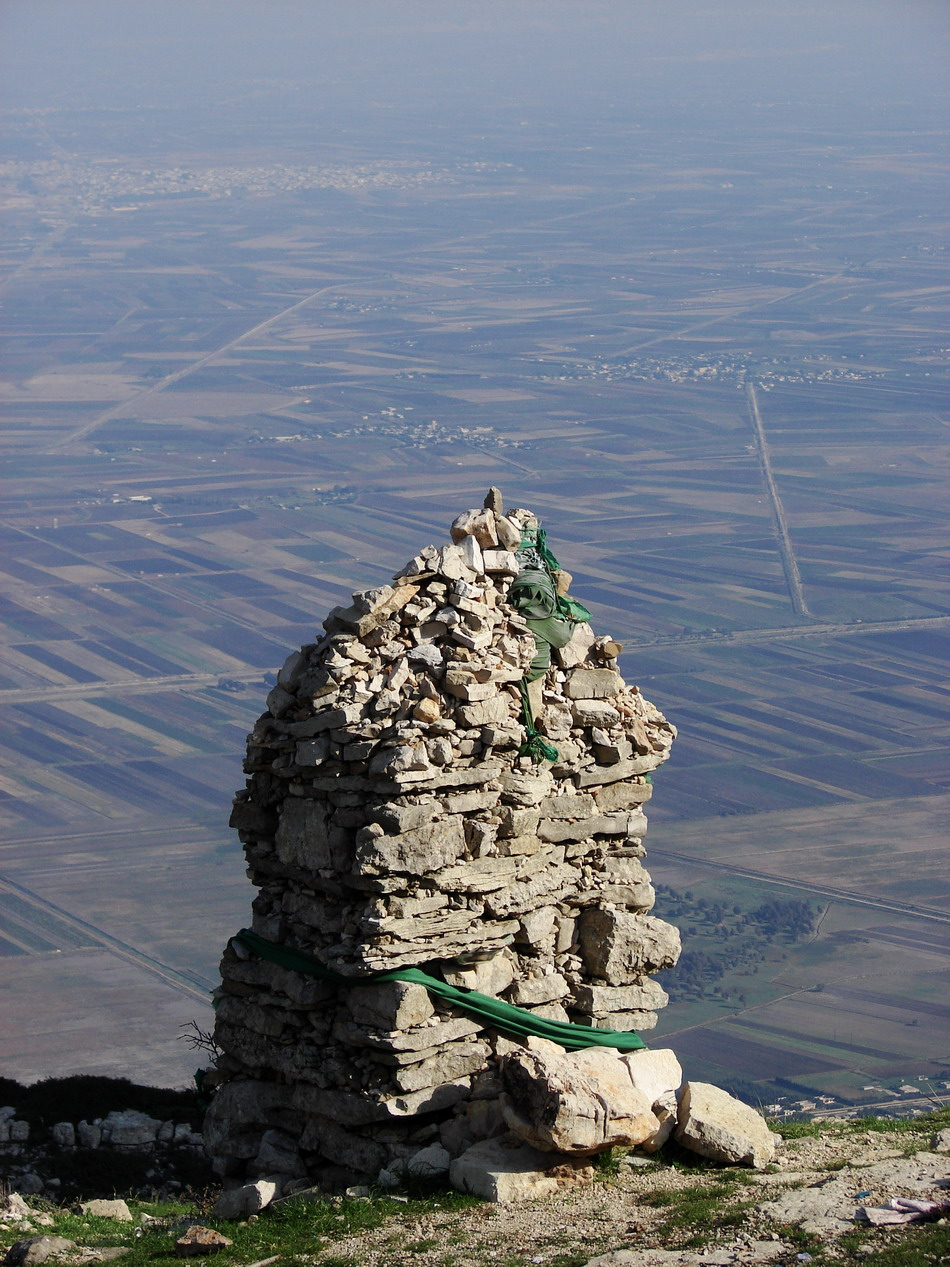
- Ghab Plain, as seen from Apamea, Syria
- Interactive map of Ghab Plain
- Coordinates: 35.545°N 36.319°E
- Location: Western Syria, primarily in al-Suqaylabiyah District
- Water bodies: Orontes River
- Etymology: "Forest Plain"

Area
  - Total: 41,000 hectares (160 mi^{2})

Dimensions
  - Length: 63 kilometres (39 mi)
  - Width: 12.1 kilometres (7.5 mi)

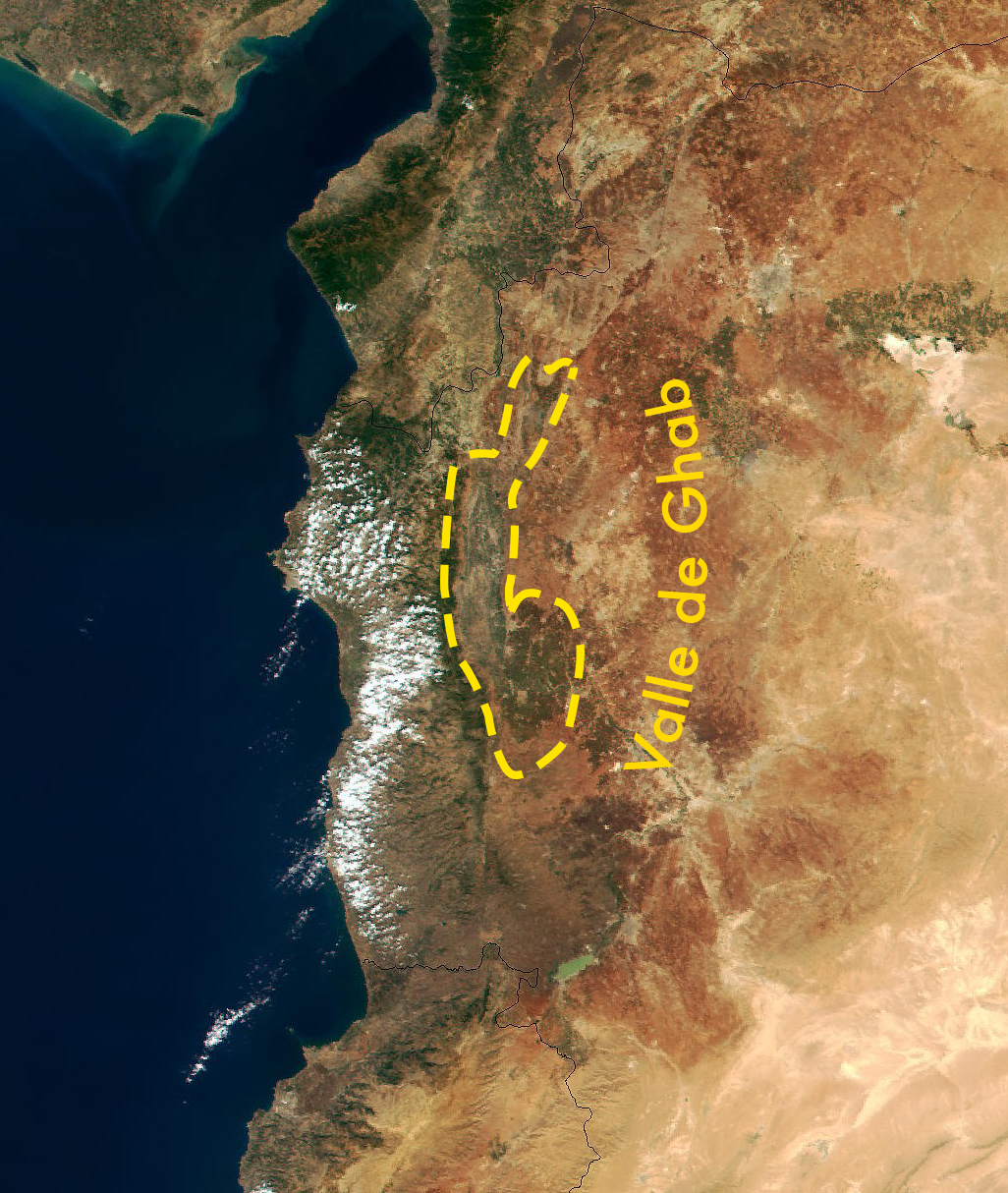
Al-Ghab Plain in west Syria

The Ghab Plain (Arabic: سَهْلُ ٱلْغَابِ, romanized: Sahl al-Ġāb, literally: Forest Plain) is a fertile depression lying mainly in the al-Suqaylabiyah District in western Syria. The Orontes River, flowing north, enters the Plain near Muhradah, around 25 km north-west of Hama.

The valley was flooded for centuries by the waters of the Orontes River, which rendered it a swamp. The "Ghab project", beginning in the 1950s, drained the valley to make it habitable, arable land, providing an extra 41,000 hectares (160 mi^{2}) of irrigated farmland.

The valley separates the al-Ansariyah mountains in the west from the Zawiyah mountain range and the plateau region to the east. It is 63 kilometres (39 mi) long and 12.1 kilometres (7.5 mi) wide.

== Fisheries ==
Before its drainage, the Ghab was the center of the catfish (Silurus glanis) (sallōr or samak aswad) fisheries of the Orontes valley.

== Ghab project ==
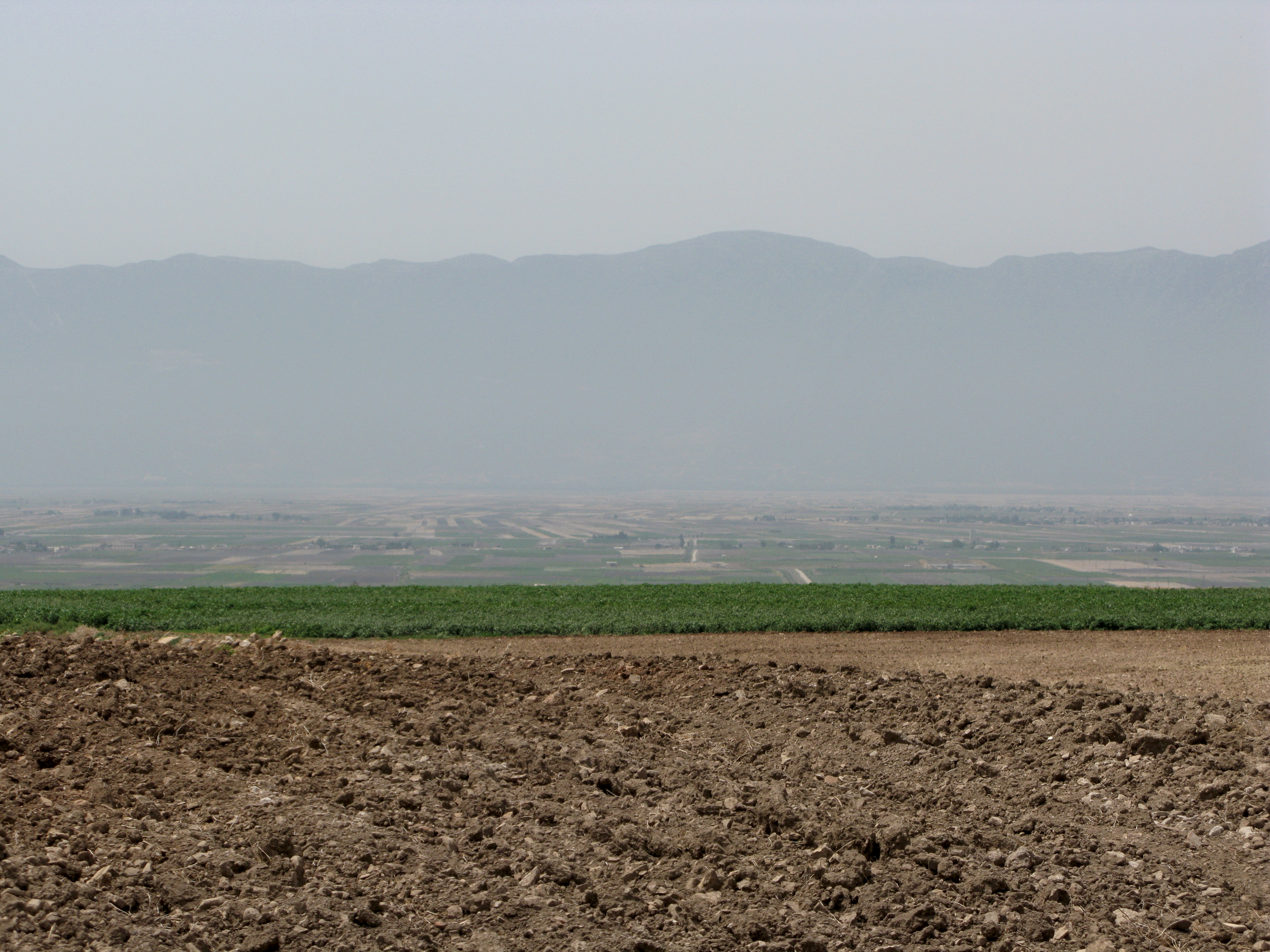
Al-Ghab Plain and Syrian coastal mountains as seen from Apamea, Syria.

The Ghab project began in 1953 and made the area suitable for agriculture, by deploying new irrigation systems. The system included barrages, canal networks for irrigation and canal networks for drainage. Large barrages were built in Mahardah, Zayzun, Qarqur and other villages. The dam at Mahardah, built in 1961, is 40 metres (130 ft) high, and 200 metres (660 ft) long and holds 65,000,000 cubic metres (85,000,000 cu yd) of water. The Zeyzoun Dam, built in 1996, was 32 metres (105 ft) high and held a maximum of 71,000,000 cubic metres (93,000,000 cu yd) of water; it failed in June 2002, leading to the deaths of 22 people and the displacement of over 2,000 as a large hole opened in the embankment and flooded 80 square kilometres (31 mi^{2}) of the countryside downstream.

Other advantages of the Ghab project were the improvements in the systems of communication through the building of road and rail networks, previously not possible due to the swamps. In addition, malaria decreased because there was no longer stagnant water.

== Al-Ruj Plain ==
Northeast of the Ghab Plain is found another smaller plain, known as al-Ruj Plain (Rouj basin). It is located between the Ghab Plain, and Amouk Plain. This is an agriculturally prosperous enclave just west of the town of Idlib. Many ancient archaeological sites are located there.

== See also ==
- Ghab basin

== Bibliography ==
- Federal Research Division (2004), Syria a Country Study, Kessinger Publishing, ISBN 978-1-4191-5022-7
- Sofer, Arnon (1999), Rivers of fire: the conflict over water in the Middle East, Rowman & Littlefield, ISBN 978-0-8476-8511-0
- de Miranda, Adriana (2007), Water architecture in the lands of Syria: the water-wheels, L'ERMA di BRETSCHNEIDER, ISBN 978-88-8265-433-7
- Salman, Salman M. A. (2009), The World Bank Policy for Projects on International Waterways: An Historical and Legal Analysis, World Bank Publications, ISBN 978-0-8213-7953-0
