= Feddan =

Unit of area

- Unit of: Area
- Symbol: fed

Conversions
1 fed in ...	... is equal to ...
- SI units: 4,200 m^{2}

A feddan (Arabic: فدّان, romanized: faddān) is a unit of area used in Egypt, South Sudan, Sudan, Syria, and Oman. In Classical Arabic, the word means 'a yoke of oxen', implying the area of ground that could be tilled by oxen in a certain time. In Egypt, the feddan is the only non-metric unit which remained in use following the adoption of the metric system. A feddan is divided into 24 kirat (Arabic: قيراط, qīrāt), with one kirat equalling 175 square metres.

== Equivalent units ==
1 feddan = 24 kirat = 60 metre × 70 metre = 4200 square metres (m^{2}) = 0.420 hectares = 1.037 acres

In Syria, the feddan is a vaguer quantity, referring to the amount of land that can be ploughed by a pair of oxen in a year, being about 5–12 ha (12–30 acres).

== See also ==
- Acre
- Dunam
