= Maharda District =

District in Hama Governorate, Syria

Maharda District محردة Muhradah District
- District
- Map of Maharda District within Hama Governorate
- Coordinates (Maharda): 35.2500°N 36.5833°E
- Country: Syria
- Governorate: Hama
- Seat: Maharda
- Subdistricts: 3 nawāḥī

Population (2004)
  - Total: 144,506

Maharda District, also Muhradah, Mahardah or Mhardeh (Arabic: محردة Maḥarda) of the Homs Governorate, Syria. According to the 2004 Census it had a population of 144,506. The district is divided into three sub-districts (nawāḥī). Its capital is the city of Mahardah.

== History ==
During the Syrian civil war, the city of Maharda was under the control of Syrian government forces while the opposition forces controlled some of the regions outside of the city. After the 2011 Syrian protests against the government, the pro-government forces occupied the city. The Maharda Monastery became the base of operations for the forces, which were also deployed to protect the Maharda thermal power station, which was an essential source of power generation. Repeated clashes happened between the pro-government forces and the opposition. In September 2018, the pro-government forces launched an attack on several locations in the rural parts of the district held by the opposition including Kafr Zita, Al-Lataminah, and Al-Sayyad, and the opposition attacked Maharda city held by the government forces, which resulted in several civilian deaths. In February 2019, armed opposition fighters attacked the Maharda electricity power station.

== Geography ==
Maharda District is one of the six administrative districts (manṭiqat) of Hama Governorate, Syria. (Note: Sources state the five districts of Hama Governorate as Al-Suqaylabiyah, Hama, Maharda, Masyaf, and Salamiyah. Salhab District was established by a presidential decree in 2024.) The city of Maharda, the capital of the district, is located approximately 23 km (14 mi) northwest of Hama. The Mehardeh Thermal Power Project was constructed in the 1960s on the Mahardah Dam located on the Orontes River and supplied electricity to entire Syria. The district is divided into three sub-districts (nawāḥī)–Maharda (محردة), Kafr Zita (كفر زيتا), and Karnaz (كرناز).

== Demographics ==
According to the 2004 census, the district had a population of 144,506, comprising 74,051 males and 70,455 females. The census recorded 22,861 households, with an average household size of 6.3 people. The illiteracy rate was 10.5% among males and 27.6% among females. About 47.2% of the population were recorded as engaged in paid work, 22.8% were self-employed and 22.8% worked without pay. Approximately 84.1% of the households were own houses.

The 2004 census recorded 80,165 inhabitants in Maharda sub-district, 39,302 in Kafr Zita and 25,039 in Karnaz. According to an estimate by the United Nations Office for the Coordination of Humanitarian Affairs (OCHA) in 2021, the population was 34,443 in Maharda sub-district and 7,216 in Karnaz. According to OCHA's 2024 report, Maharda sub-district had an estimated population of 40,445, Kafr Zita had 1,144 and Karnaz had 14,212. The district had an estimated population of 55,801, including 2,161 internally displaced people.
