= Hama Governorate =

Administrative division of Syria

Hama Governorate مُحافظة حماة
- Governorate
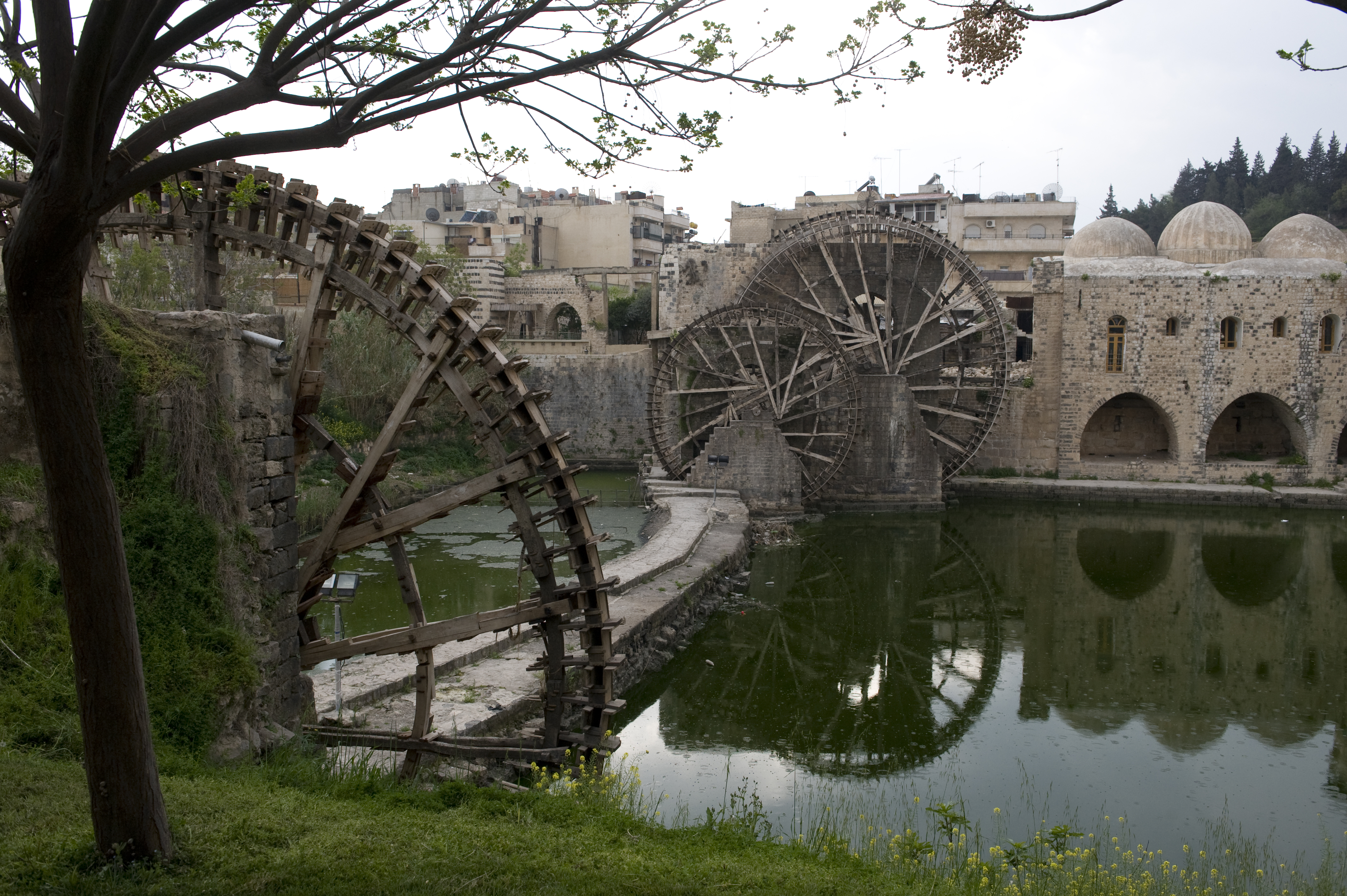
- Norias of Hama

- Seal

- Map of Syria with Hama highlighted
- Interactive map of Hama Governorate
- Coordinates (Hama): 35.2°N 37.2°E
- Country: Syria
- Capital: Hama
- Manatiq (Districts): 5

Government
  - Governor: Abdulrahman al-Sihyan

Area
  - Total: 8,883 km^{2} (3,430 sq mi)
- Estimates range between 8,844 km^{2} and 8,883 km^{2}

Population (2011)
  - Total: 1,628,000
  - Density: 183.3/km^{2} (474.7/sq mi)
- Time zone: UTC+3 (AST)
- ISO 3166 code: SY-HM
- Main language(s): Arabic
- Website: hama.gov.sy

Hama Governorate (Arabic: مُحافظة حماة, romanized: Muḥāfaẓat Ḥamāh) is one of the fourteen governorates of Syria. It is situated in western-central Syria, bordering Idlib and Aleppo Governorates to the north, Raqqa Governorate to the east, Homs Governorate to the south, and Tartus and Latakia Governorates to the west. It is the only Governorate (excluding Damascus) that does not border a foreign country. Measures of its area vary from 8,844 km^{2} to 8,883 km^{2}, with its capital being the city of Hama, also notably being the only Governorate with no land borders with any foreign countries.

== History ==
=== Archaeological sites ===
- Al Qubays – medieval castle
- Apamea – Graeco-Roman city
- Bourzey castle – Byzantine castle
- Masyaf Castle – medieval castle
- Shmemis – Ayyubid castle
- Tell Asharneh – possible site of Bronze Age Tunip
- Tell Qarqur – ancient settlement

=== Modern Syria ===
Hama has historically been a centre of opposition to the Assad regime, and it was the centre of an uprising in the late 1970s to the early 1980s that resulted in the 1982 Hama massacre.

=== Syrian Civil War ===
The city was one of several that saw anti-Assad protests in 2011, the violent suppression of which ultimately led to the outbreak of civil war. Despite this, for the most part the governorate has stayed under the Syrian Government's control, with exceptions of parts of the north-west in the early years of the conflict. The eastern desert regions of the governorate fell under the control of Islamic State by 2016, but by September 2017 the Syrian Army had managed to oust them. During the 2024 Northwestern Syria Offensive, the Syrian Salvation Government captured large portions of the governorate. On 5 December 2024, the governorate's capital Hama was captured.

== Geography ==
The western regions of the governorate are part of the Syrian Coastal Mountain Range (Nusayriyah Mountains), running north to south. Roughly parallel with the mountains to the east is the Ghab Plain, with the Orontes river flowing through it, Hama city lies on this river. The central and eastern regions of the governorate consist of flatter desert terrain.

=== Settlements ===
The provincial capital is Hama; other major settlements include Akakir, Al-Hamraa, Al Qastal, Al-Saan, Aqarib as Safi, At Tammazah, Ithriya, Kafr Buhum, Karnaz, Maharda, Masyaf, Morek, Qalaat al-Madiq, Qasr Ibn Wardan, Sabburah, Salamiyah, Shaykh Hilal, Shaytalun, Suran and Tayyibat at Turki.

=== Districts ===
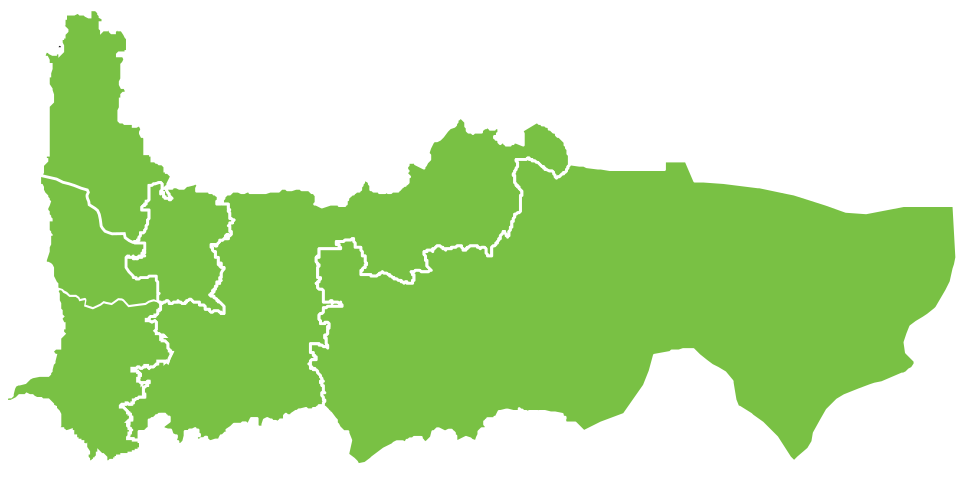

The governorate is divided into five districts (manatiq). The districts are further divided into 22 sub-districts (nawahi):

- Hama District (4 sub-districts)
  - Hama Subdistrict
  - Suran Subdistrict
  - Hirbnafsah Subdistrict
  - Al-Hamraa Subdistrict
- Masyaf District (5 sub-districts)
  - Masyaf Subdistrict
  - Jubb Ramlah Subdistrict
  - Awj Subdistrict
  - Ayn Halaqim Subdistrict
  - Wadi al-Uyun Subdistrict
- Mahardah District (3 sub-districts; a.k.a. Mhardeh, Muhardeh)
  - Mahardah Subdistrict
  - Kafr Zita Subdistrict
  - Karnaz Subdistrict
- Salamiyah District (5 sub-districts)
  - Salamiyah Subdistrict
  - Barri Sharqi Subdistrict
  - Al-Saan Subdistrict
  - Sabburah Subdistrict
  - Uqayribat Subdistrict
- Al-Suqaylabiyah District (5 sub-districts)
  - Al-Suqaylabiyah Subdistrict
  - Tell Salhab Subdistrict
  - Al-Ziyarah Subdistrict
  - Shathah Subdistrict
  - Qalaat al-Madiq Subdistrict

== Economy ==
Agriculture dominates the labor force of Hama Governorate, with 48% of employment occurring within this sector. The remaining employment is spread between industry (22%) and trade and other services (30%). The main agricultural crops are wheat, barley, cotton, beetroot, onion, tobacco, and various vegetables. Fruit trees such as olive, pistachio, apple, pear, plum and peach are also commonly grown here. Animal breeding of sheep, goats, poultry and bees are prevalent in Hama.

Between 1926 and 1949, Hama witnessed developments in its public sector with industry expanding on sugar plants, onion drying, oils manufacturing, cotton grinning factories, and cement production and processing. Other manufacturing industry that was expanded include soda, ice cream, candy, textile, wool, cotton, rugs, carpets, gowns, and horse saddles. The region is also Syria's center of its chemical and manufacturing industry.

== Demographics ==
As per the 2004 Syrian census the population was 1,385,000. A 2011 UNOCHA estimate put the population at 1,628,000, though this has likely changed since the start of the war.

Religious composition of Hama Governorate (2011)
Sunni Muslims	67%
Alawites	17%
Ismaili Muslims	10%
Christians	6%
Shia Muslims	0.1%

At the end of 2011, the population of Hama was estimated at 1,628,000, representing 8% of Syria's population. Sunni Muslims form the majority at 67%, followed by Alawites (17%), Ismaili Muslims (10%), Christians (6%) and Twelver Shia Muslims (0.1%).

== Gallery ==
Map of Hama Governorate

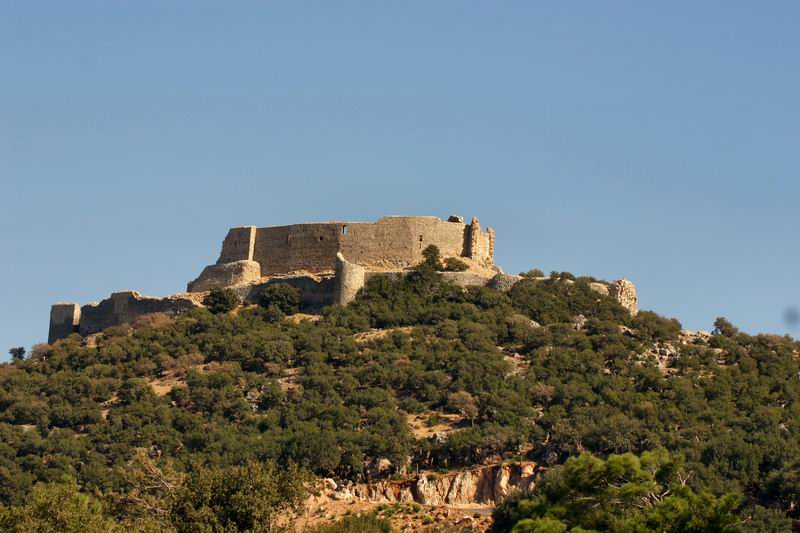
Abu Qubays castle

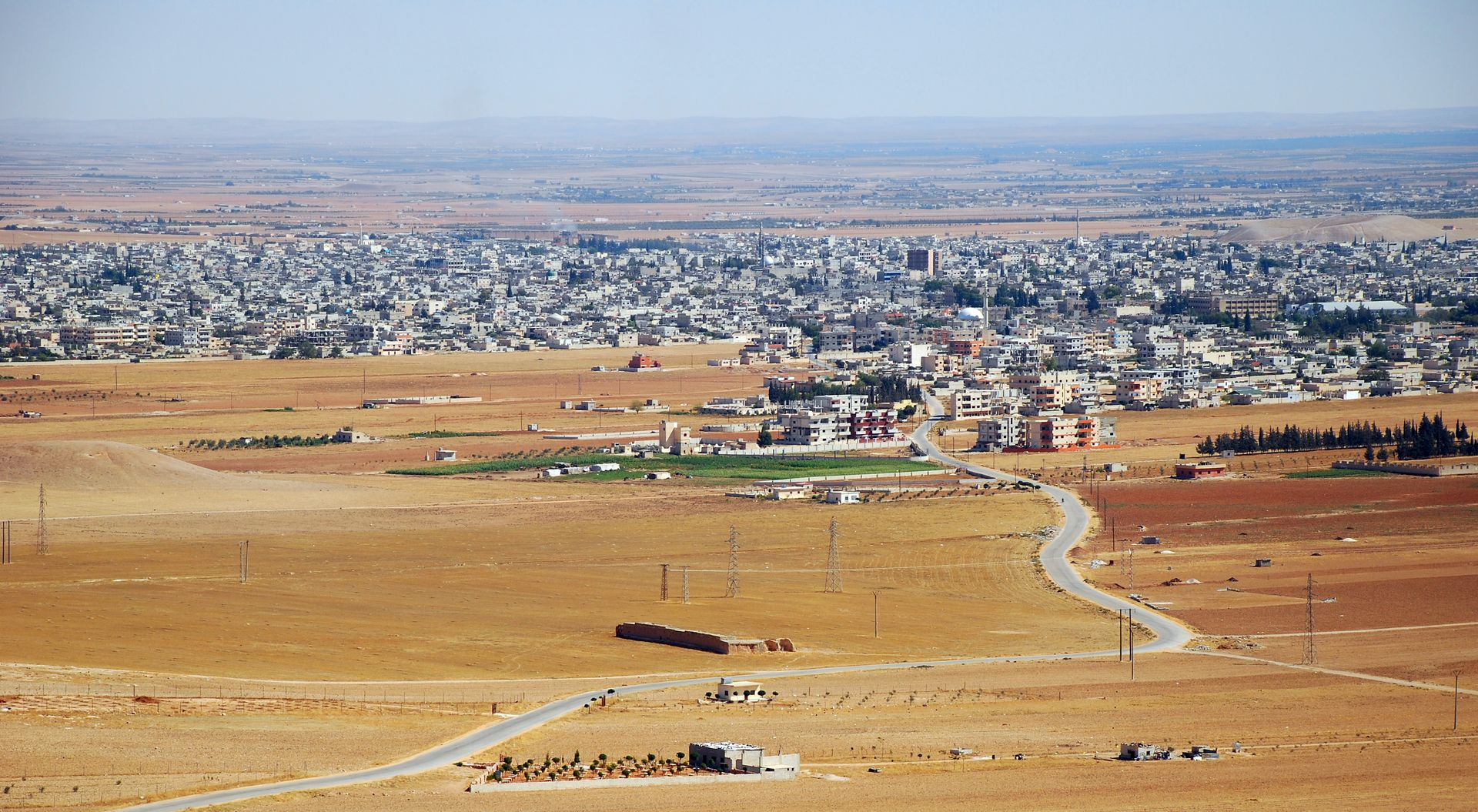
Salamiyyah

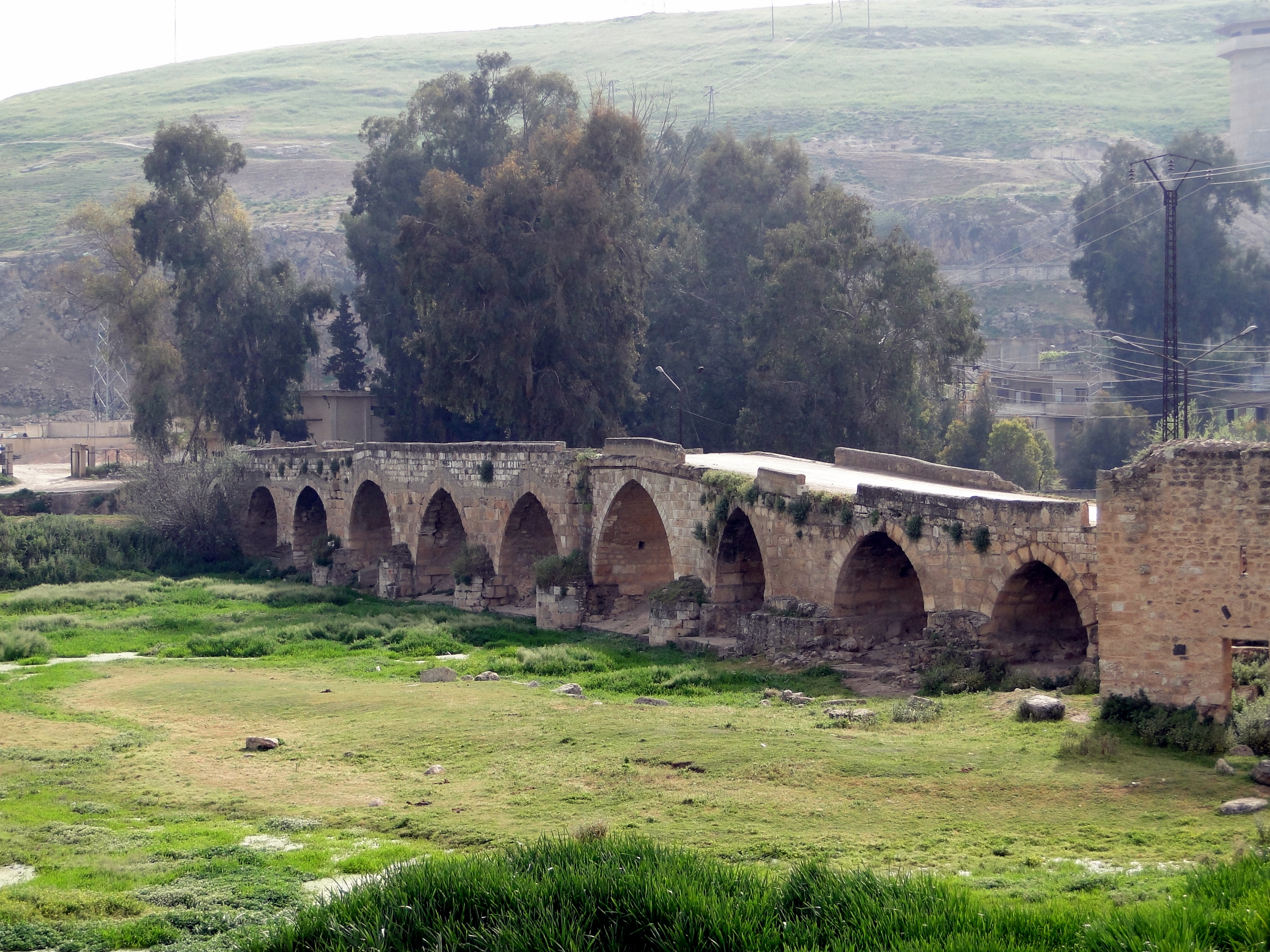
Roman bridge in Mahardah

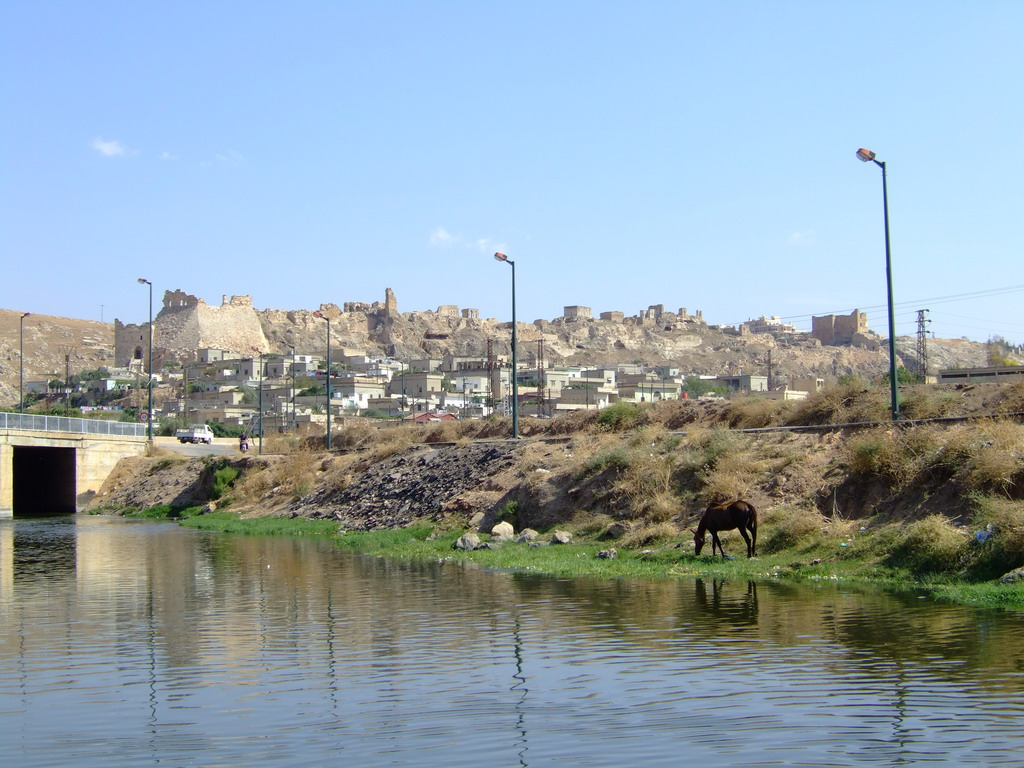
Shayzar

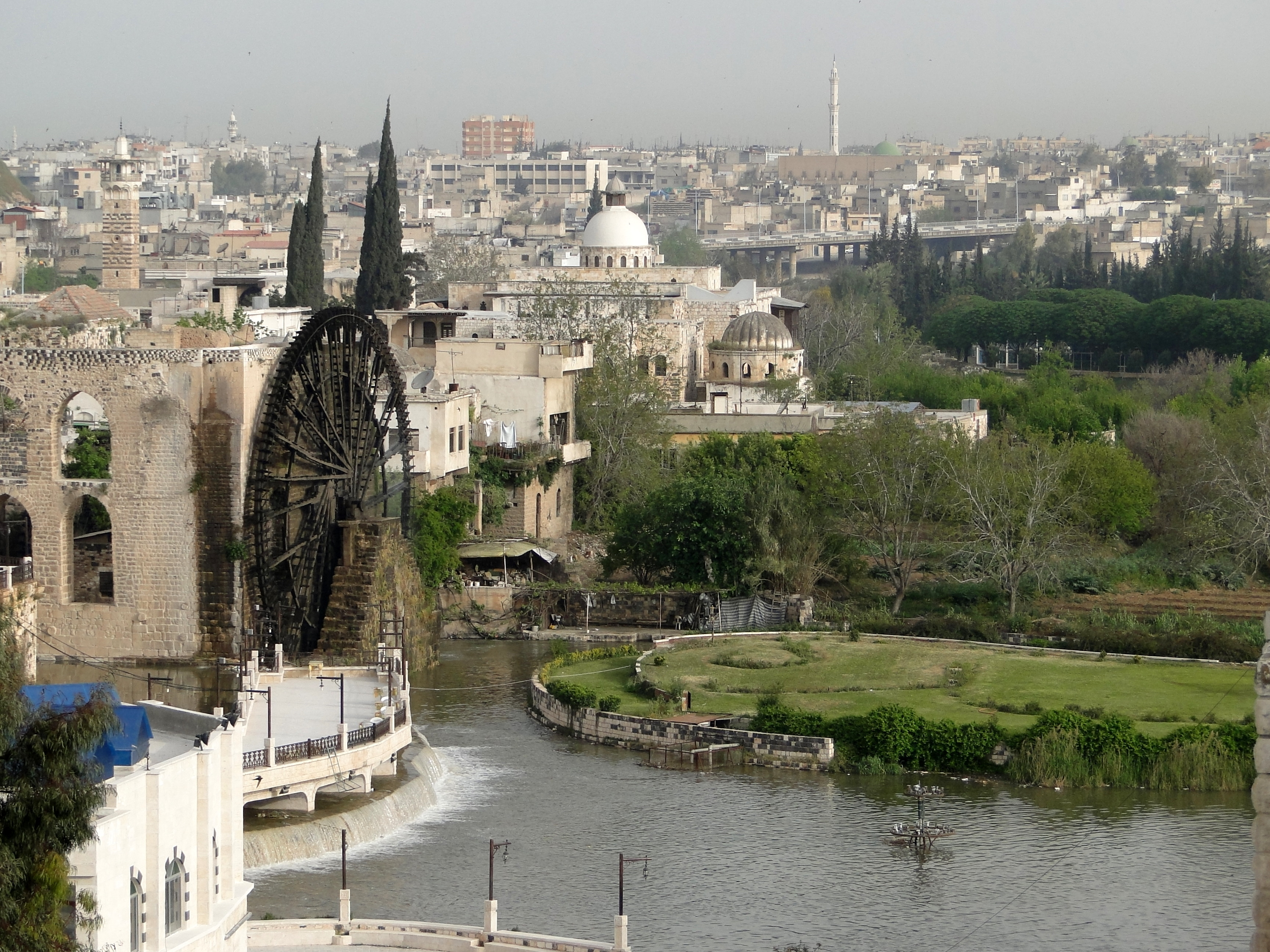
Hama
