= 2015 Hama offensive =

Military operation in the Syrian Civil War

- Part of the Syrian Civil War
- Map of Syria with Hama highlighted
Date	28 November – 15 December 2015 (2 weeks and 3 days)
Location	Hama Governorate, Syria
Result	Syrian Army victory: Syrian army recaptures Al-Buwaydah, Masasineh and Tall Huwayr hill

Belligerents
Jund al-Aqsa; Army of Conquest: Al-Nusra Front; Ahrar ash-Sham; Free Syrian Army: Army of Victory; Falcons of al-Ghab	Syrian Arab Republic: Syrian Armed Forces; National Defense Force; Quwat al-Ghadab; Khaybar Brigade; Air strikes: Russia: Russian Air Force

Casualties and losses
38+ killed	9+ killed

The 2015 Hama offensive was a military operation launched by Syrian rebels during the Syrian Civil War in the northern parts of Hama Governorate.

== The offensive ==
The Jund al-Aqsa rebel group initiated a large-scale offensive in the northern part of Hama province on 28 November 2015. The initial aim of the operation was to capture the Alawite village of Ma'an. Over the next two days, their assault at Ma’an, as well against the other surrounding villages, was repelled. A few days later, on 2 December, the Army of Conquest Islamist rebel coalition launched a new assault towards Ma’an, but their attack was reportedly disrupted after they were ambushed at the Morek Hills by the 87th Brigade of the 11th Tank Division.

On 3 December, fighting took place in the Al-Ghaab plains of Hama province, at al-Mansoura, al-Qahira and Tal Zajram, while Army bombardment was reported at Tal Wasit, al-Enkaw and al-Manara. The military reportedly secured the southern entrance of the hilltop village of Tal Zajram.

Jund al-Aqsa renewed their offensive on 13 December by attacking the villages of Ma’sasineh, Al-Buwaydah and Markabat. The following day, the rebels seized the villages of Al-Buwaydah and Ma’sasineh, as well as the Al-Zulaqiyat and Zalin checkpoints ("Jabal ash-Shir"). However, following the arrival of military reinforcements, the Syrian Army recaptured both villages and the Zalin checkpoint. As a result of these reverses, the rebel offensive stalled. The fighting left 22 rebels, including six foreigners, and nine soldiers dead.

By the morning of 15 December, the Syrian Army recaptured all areas lost the previous day. In addition, government forces also captured the Tell Huwayr hill, which overlooks the town of Morek.

== See also ==
- 2014 Hama offensive
- Northwestern Syria offensive (April–June 2015)
- Northwestern Syria offensive (October–November 2015)
