= Al-Ghab offensive (July–August 2015) =

Part of the Syrian Civil War

Coordinates: 35.8000°N 36.3167°E

- Part of the Syrian Civil War
- Territorial changes during the al-Ghab offensive Opposition control pre-offensive Territory gained by Opposition during offensive Maximum extent of rebel advance; recaptured by Syrian Army
Date	28 July – 28 August 2015 (1 month)
Location	Al-Ghab plain, Idlib and Hama Governorates, Syria (For a war map of the current situation in Al-Ghab plain, see here.)
Status	Rebel victory: Rebels capture 13 towns/villages, along with four hills; Army recaptures two towns/villages

Belligerents
Army of Conquest; Al-Nusra Front; Jund al-Aqsa; Ahrar al-Sham; Ajnad al-Kavkaz; Imam Bukhari Jamaat; Jabhat Ansar al-Din; Liwa al-Muhajireen wal-Ansar; Harakat Sham al-Islam; Harakat Fajr ash-Sham al-Islamiya; Turkistan Islamic Party; Katibat al-Tawhid wal-Jihad; Free Syrian Army	(Syria) Syrian Arab Republic; Hezbollah; Syrian Social Nationalist Party; Syrian Resistance; Liwa Fatemiyoun; Lions of Hussein Brigade

Commanders and leaders
(Syrian opposition) Lt. Hassan Khalil (Falcons of Mount Zawiya Brigade commander)	(Syria) Col. Suhayl al-Hasan (WIA) (Tiger Forces commander) (Syria) Col. Ali Al-Hajji † (Cheetah Forces commander)

Units involved
(Syrian opposition) Free Syrian Army; Army of Victory Operations Room; (Syrian opposition) Falcons of al-Ghab; (Syrian opposition) Falcons of Mount Zawiya Brigade; Gathering of Glory	Syrian Arab Armed Forces; Syrian Army; 11th Armored Division; 40th Tank Brigade; 87th Brigade; 155th Brigade; Tiger Forces; Cheetah Forces Brigade; Special Forces; 54th Regiment; Republican Guard; 106th Brigade; Suqur al-Sahara; National Defence Forces; Hezbollah Units

Casualties and losses
186–226 killed	203 killed and wounded
- 22 civilians killed and 70+ wounded

The al-Ghab offensive (July–August 2015) was an offensive launched by rebels during the Syrian Civil War to capture areas surrounding Jisr al-Shughur, and to establish a foothold in the al-Ghab plain, in northwestern Syria's Idlib and Hama governorates.

== Background ==
The 2015 Northwestern Syria offensive, dubbed by the rebels as Battle of Victory, took place in Idlib and Hama.

The campaign consisted of a three-pronged attack, with the two main assaults spearheaded by Ahrar ash-Sham, al-Qaeda's al-Nusra Front, and other Sunni Islamist factions under the banner of the Army of Conquest, and the remaining attack force including collaboration with Free Syrian Army groups. The commander of the 13th Division, affiliated with the FSA, stated that coordinating with other groups such as al-Nusra Front did not mean they were aligned with them. Within days, the rebels captured the city of Jisr al-Shughur and later on an Army base. The success of the campaign was attributed to better coordination between the Syrian opposition's backers. Still, the operation resulted in a high attrition rate for both sides.

== The offensive ==
=== Initial rebel assault ===
On 28 July 2015, rebels launched a coordinated assault to capture the remaining areas surrounding Jisr ash-Shughur. Two hours later, rebels had captured the strategic hills of Tal Khattab, Tal Awar and Tal Hamka; along with the towns of Frikka, Mushayrafah, Salat Al-Zuhour and Zayzun. The Army retreated to the south in order to reinforce its positions at Tal Wassit and Tal Sheikh Elyas. The Army responded with 160 airstrikes and dozens of shells and missiles. According to the SOHR, about 90 government fighters were killed or wounded during the assault, while 37 rebels (15 non-Syrian; including a Jordanian leader) were killed.

=== Army counter-attack ===
Three days later on 1 August, the military recaptured Ziyadia and Zayzun, including its power station. In addition, they captured the towns of Khirbat al-Naqus and Mansura and its surrounding areas. The advances came after the Air Force had conducted more than 270 air-strikes on rebel positions over four days. The fighting had left 39 combatants dead, including 20 soldiers and 19 rebels.

On 2 August, government troops managed to recapture the Frikkah area, Khirbat al-Naqus, Mansura, al-Ziyadiyyah, Zayzun power plant and its dam, Tal Awar, Al-Ziyarah area and other areas on the outskirts of Idlib governorate and al-Ghab Plain. The fighting in the preceding 72 hours left more than 115 rebels and 42 government fighters dead. Later that day, rebels launched a counter-attack and managed to recapture parts of Frikkah. However, this claim was refuted by pro-government outlet Al-Masdar, which stated that the Army never re-entered Frikkah.

On 3 August, rebels recaptured Tal Awar and Frikkah, after the Army retreated from them, while the Army recaptured Tal Hamka. At least 30 government fighters and 16 rebels were killed. According to Al-Masdar, the Army repelled an attack on Fawru. Meanwhile, a Syrian warplane crashed inside Ariha, leaving a number of casualties among civilians. The fate of its crew was unclear.

=== Rebels regain ground ===
On 5 August, rebels launched a counter-offensive and advanced towards the Army operation command center in Jurin and recaptured several positions in the Al-Ghab plain, including Tal Hamka, Tal Awar, the Zayzun thermal plant and Zayzun. At least 12 government fighters and 9 rebels were killed, while a number of armoured vehicles and tanks were destroyed by BGM-71 TOW missiles. Later that day, rebels captured al-Bahsa village and advanced into Safsafa, killing 17 government fighters, while losing 19 fighters.

On 6 August, the Army launched counter-attacks on al-Bahsa, Mansura and Tal Awar, recapturing al-Bahsa and Mansura. 29 government fighters and 35 rebels were killed since 5 August.

On 7 August, rebels captured Qarqur, its hill and Mashik. The military leader of "Qawat Al-Fahoud" (Cheetah Forces), Colonel ‘Ali Al-Hajji was killed, while the leader of “Qawat Al-Nimr” (Tiger Forces), Colonel Suheil Al-Hassan was wounded in a rebel mortar attack on a government military camp. A leading al-Nusra Front leader was also killed. Later that day, government forces reportedly recaptured Mashik and most of Qarqur. Pro-government sources also confirmed that al-Bahsa was back in rebel hands at that time. The SOHR reported that government forces recaptured large parts of al-Mshek and al-Bahsa during the counter-attack.

On 9 August, rebels recaptured Mansura, al-Ziyara, the silos area, Tal Wassit, al-Tanmia checkpoint and a number of military vehicles (including tanks). The Army conducted over 80 airstrikes, covering the retreat of the government forces in the area. The rebels lost 33 fighters during the assault.

On 10 August, over 90 airstrikes were conducted on villages and towns in the al-Ghab plain, killing a number of rebels. The SOHR reported that one of these villages was Khirbat al-Naqus, which was previously not mentioned as captured by the rebels the day before.

On 14 August, the rebels blew up two bridges at al-Ziyara, in the al-Ghab plain, to prevent future government advancements. That day, five soldiers were executed by the rebels in Idlib city, in protest of the mistreatment of rebel prisoners in Hama Central Prison.

=== Attacks and counter-attacks continue ===
Situation in Idlib governorate, late-August 2015

On 18 August, the military launched a new counter-offensive recapturing several villages, including Khirbat al-Naqus, al-Ziyara, Mansura and Tal Wassit. Later, they also captured Msheek and advanced in al-Qahera. Two days later, government forces also secured the southern sector of Qarqur.

On 25 August, rebels launched a new counter-attack and recaptured al-Ziyara, al-Msheek, Mansura, Tal Wassit and Khirbat Al-Naqus, as the Syrian Army retreated with little resistance. At least 14 soldiers were killed, while government forces also lost a number of military vehicles, including tanks. On the same day, the Syrian Armed Forces were attempting to recapture the contested town of Al-Bahsa, which was 60 percent under their control (they ended up recapturing it on 10 October).

On 28 August, the Army again launched a counter-attack and recaptured Khirbat Al-Naqus. According to Al-Masdar News, the "Tiger Force" pulled back its forces during the last rebel counter-attack and did not participate.

== Aftermath ==
On 10 October, the Syrian Armed Forces were able to take full-control of the town of Fawru.
