= Northwestern Syria offensive (October–November 2015) =

Russo-Iran-Hezbollah joint offensive in Syria

- Part of the Syrian Civil War
- The military situation in Hama Governorate Wider strategic view, including the Aleppo offensive. Syrian Army control Syrian Opposition control SDF control Islamic State control Ongoing confrontation or unclear situation
Date	7 October – 10 November 2015 (1 month and 3 days)
Location	Hama and Idlib Governorates, Syria
Result	Inconclusive
Territorial changes	The Syrian Army captures Al-Bahsa, Fawru, Sirmaniyah, Safsafah and most of Jeb al-Ahmar; The Syrian Army recaptures al-Bani, Mughayr and Tal Al-Sakhr hill; Rebels capture al-Dil, Hamidid gas station, al-Janabra hill, Morek, al-Tawil hill, Mantana and Tell Swan hill; Rebels recapture Kafr Nabuda, Mansura, Lahaya, Maarkaba, Sukayk, Tell Uthman hill, Tell Sukayk hill, Atshan and Om Hartein

Belligerents
Syrian Arab Republic; Iran; Russia; Allied groups: SSNP; Syrian Resistance; Hezbollah; Liwa Fatemiyoun	Army of Conquest; Al-Nusra Front; Jund al-Aqsa; Ahrar ash-Sham; Ajnad al-Kavkaz; (Syrian opposition) Free Syrian Army; Jaysh al-Islam; Turkistan Islamic Party in Syria

Commanders and leaders
(Iran) Maj. Gen. Qasem Soleimani (Iran) Col. Hamid Mokhtar Band † (Iran) Col. Farshad Hasounizade † (Ba'athist Syria) Lt. Gen. Ali Abdullah Ayyoub (Ba'athist Syria) Brig Gen. Taleb Salamah † (Ba'athist Syria) Col. Wasim Khaddam; Reza Khavari † (Fatemiyoun Brigade commander); Hassan Hussein al-Haj † (Hezbollah senior leader); Mahdi Hassan Obeid † (Hezbollah commander) (Russia) Viktor Bondarev (chief of staff Russian Air Force)	As'ad Al-Aryan † (Ahrar al-Sham Emir); Bassam al-Qabalan †(Ahrar al-Sham Mufti); Hassan al-Mrei † (Ahrar al-Sham field commander); Assad al Eriyan †(Ahrar al-Sham field commander); Abu Bakr Hazano †(Al-nursa field commander); Emir Abu Al-Qa'qa †(Jund al-Aqsa commander); Adnan al-Khaled †(Jund al-Aqsa commander); Ahmad Khaled Abd al-Jalil † (Jund al-Aqsa commander); Abu al-Bara'a al-Demaqi † (Jund al-Aqsa commander) (Syria) Brig. General Rashid Bakdash † (FSA officer) (Syria) Maj. Mohamed Mansour (Jaysh al-Nasr leader) (Syria) Col. Fares al-Bayous (Fursan al-Haq leader) (Syria) Lt. Col. Ahmed al-Seoud (13th Division leader) (Syria) Al Shiekh Muhammed Shabeeb †(FSA Field Commander)

Units involved
Syrian Armed Forces; Syrian Army; 10th Tank Division's 87th Brigade; 7th Division; 9th Division; 4th Assault Corps; 47th Tank Brigade; Republican Guard's 106th Brigade; Local National Defence Forces militias; Russian Ground Forces; 74th Guards Motor Rifle Brigade; 291st Artillery Brigade; Russian Air Force; Iranian and affiliated forces; Islamic Revolutionary Guard Corps; Liwa Fatemiyoun	(Syrian opposition) Free Syrian Army; (Syrian opposition) Jaysh al-Nasr; (Syrian opposition) 13th Division; 101st Division; Knights of Justice Brigade

Strength
7,000+	Unknown

Casualties and losses
119+ killed 11 tanks destroyed 2 tanks damaged 2 tanks captured 1 APC destroyed 1 APC captured 2 vehicles captured 1 helicopter destroyed 1 MiG-21 destroyed 57 armoured vehicles destroyed (Rebel claim)	81+ killed
- 12+ civilians killed

On the 7 October 2015, shortly after the start of the Russian air campaign in Syria, the Syrian government forces and its allies launched a ground offensive against anti-government positions in northwestern Syria, initially in northern Hama Governorate. The primary objective is to seal off the northern Hama border with Idlib and "build a buffer-zone around the city of Khan Sheikhoun". It has been described as the first major Syrian-Russian coordinated attack since the start of the Syrian Civil War. The offensive was extended in the subsequent days to the al-Ghab plains, between northwest Hama and southwest Idlib, as well as to the edge of the Latakia governorate.

== Background ==
Before the start of the government offensive, Russia moved substantial numbers of advisors and artillery pieces into Hama Governorate. Troops belonging to the 74th Guards Motor Rifle Brigade and 291st Artillery Brigade were deployed to support the Syrian ground forces. In preparation of the offensive, Russian TOS-1 multiple rocket launchers bombarded rebel positions.

== The campaign ==
=== Syrian Government offensive ===
On the 7 October, the Syrian Army backed by the National Defence Forces and Russian airstrikes launched the offensive against the rebel-held villages of Kafr Nabouda, Qala'at Al-Madayq, Lahaya, Al-Mughayr, Latmin, Al-Lataminah, Kafr Zita and Markabah. According to the SOHR, eight vehicles and tanks of the Army were destroyed by the rebels in the initial phase of the offensive, while it also stated that rebel bases and vehicles were bombed at the same time.

Later that day, the Army advanced in Latmin, while the rebels reportedly destroyed three more tanks on the shifting frontline. Meanwhile, rebels launched a counter-attack on Murak and reportedly captured a hill.

The Russian Air Force conducted at least 40 airstrikes that day. Conversely, pro-government sources listed the destruction of 10 tanks and BMPs. The Army captured Al-Mughayr, Markabah, Tal Sakhar and Tal Uthman that day, while it was also claimed that the village of Al-Haweez and the town of Kafr Nabouda were temporally held before a strong rebel counter-attack allegedly pushed them back to Latmin.

The next day, rebels downed a Syrian or Russian helicopter near Kafr Nabouda, with a possible second one nearby. The SOHR reported that the rebels regained some ground in the area of Kafr Nabouda and destroyed an APC in the progress.

On the 9 October, the military captured most of the hilly Jubb al-Ahmar region. The SOHR also reported that the Army was still trying to capture Atshan (previously reported as captured), while the rebels destroyed and damaged six tanks that day.

On the 10 October, the Syrian Army captured the strategically important villages of Atshan and Om Hartein and the Sukayk hill, while also making attempts to push onwards to capture Khan Shaykhun in southern Idlib province. A number of government tanks and APC's were targeted during the clashes. Hezbollah senior leader Hassan Hussein al-Haj and a rebel commander were killed that day during the takeover of Tal Sukayk.

On the 11 October, Hezbollah backed by the Army captured al-Bahsa in the al-Ghab plains, while rebels destroyed a tank. In addition, the Army also advanced from Morek and Atshan.

On the morning of the 12 October, the Army captured the southern part of Kafr Nabuda, which coincided with 30 Russian airstrikes and hundreds of shells and rockets fired by government forces. Soon after, the military secured the town and also seized the village of Mansoura, in the al-Ghab plain, and Sukayk, just inside Idlib province. However, a subsequent rebel counter-attack later in the day recaptured Kafr Nabuda. This came after jihadist rebel reinforcements arrived. At least 25 pro-government fighters, including 7 Hezbollah militiamen, had been killed since the assault on Kafr Nabuda started. Another 20 Hezbollah fighters had also been wounded.

On the 13 October, government forces captured Lahaya, while clashes continued in the outskirts of Kafr Nabuda. That day, two Iranian colonels were killed on the Hama frontline. Beside the reinforcements, the rebels were deploying an "extensive amount" of BGM-71 TOW's along the frontline and announced a counter-offensive to "retake Hama". It was also reported that Hezbollah had concentrated all its fighters in the northwest of Syria for the offensive.

On the 14 October, government forces captured the villages of Fawru and Sirmaniyah in the al-Ghab plain. By this point, in the opinion of the ISW, the Syrian government achieved limited success in the offensive's first week, capturing 6 villages while suffering heavy casualties.

On the 15 October, government forces captured the village of al-Safsafah in the Ghab plains. In response to the Russian-backed offensive by the Syrian Army, the jihadist Turkistan Islamic Party in Syria sent fighters to the Ghab Plain to support rebels in fighting against the Syrian Army, Iranian, and Hezbollah forces. Photos of Uyghur fighters from Turkistan Islamic Party were released with captions in Arabic that said "standing up strongly to the Nusayri army and the Russians." Jab al-Ahmar and Ghamaam in Latakia's countryside where Turkistan Islamic Party fighters were transferred from Idlib in response to the Russian intervention.

On the 19 October, the military restarted operations, after the offensive was paused for the weekend. Government fighters temporally captured parts of the Mansoura grain silos before a rebel counter-attack reversed their gains. A rebel brigade commander was killed at the silos. By the next day, 16 government fighters were killed.

=== Rebel counter-offensive ===
On the 23 October, rebels captured al-Dil and also launched attacks on Sukayk hill and village. That day, rebels continued to advance, while Russian airplanes bombed a rebel headquarters. Also a rebel spokesman claimed that the losses of the SAA reached 57 armored vehicles during the course of the Hama (northwestern) offensive. At the end of the day, rebels recaptured the villages of Maarkaba and Lahaya. The clashes led to the death of at least 12 rebels and 14 government fighters and the capture of two army vehicles.

On the 24 October, Russian airplanes bombed a field hospital near al-Latamneh, killing a number of rebels and wounding medical personnel. Meanwhile, rebels were preparing to attack the Mork area.

On the 25 October, three Hama-based Free Syrian Army linked groups merged into the Jaysh al-Nasr. Meanwhile, a Syrian colonel and three soldiers were killed in the Dorin-Isterbah area, while the experienced BGM-71 TOW operator Abu Omar "TOW" was killed in Hama. A sandstorm forcibly halted all military operations at the end of day.

On the 26 October government forces, supported by heavy Russian airstrikes, reportedly recaptured Mansura in the Al-Ghab plain. A Jaysh al-Islam field commander was killed that day.

On the 27 October, rebels destroyed at least two tanks and one APC in the northern countryside of Hama, while at least 10 rebels were killed.

On the 28 October, fighting around Morek damaged two Army tanks, while another vehicle was also targeted. That day, rebels recaptured the village of Sukayk while government forces retreated from an area north of Morek. Two officers and a rebel leader were killed in the clashes. According to analysis by al-Masdar News, if the rebels can capture Morek, they will be in a good position to attack the two towns of Souran and Taybat Al-Imam which would allow them to begin their large-scale attack on the city of Hama. At the end of the day, government forces regained positions against ISIL at the Salamiya–Ithiriya highway.

On the 31 October, 20 rebel factions attacked Morek. 7 Hezbollah fighters were killed in a case of friendly fire by the Russian air force amidst a series of bombing operations against the rebels, according to a Lebanese news source.

On the 3 November, rebels captured Tall-Uthman hill, al-Janabra hill, Hamidid gas station and a position west of Morek. Rebels damaged two tanks with BGM-71 TOW, destroyed other vehicles and also seized two tanks and an APC. Five rebels, including a commander and a leader, were killed that day. At the end of the day, government forces bombed and shelled Khan Sheikhoun, killing four civilians.

On the 4 November, rebels downed a Syrian MiG-21 above Tall-Uthman hill. The pilot was killed due to a failing parachute. In the evening, around 10pm, the Syrian army was forced to abandon the strategic town of Morek after a massive rebel assault. Government forces recaptured al-Bani and reportedly also Tall-Uthman hill.

On the 5 November, rebels fully secured the town of Morek after repelling a number of Army counter-attacks. A rebel leader and a number of other rebels, as well as dozens of soldiers were killed and wounded around Morek. Analysis by a source close to the government (Al-Masdar) has attributed the quick collapse of SAA in Murak to the ISIL attack on the government's only supply route to the Aleppo Governorate. This loss caused an imminent emergency in Aleppo that subsequently forced the Military High Command to initiate a massive redeployment, which resulted in the thinning of the northeastern Hama line of defense. After this, the SAA line of defense stabilized north of Ma'an and Souran. At the end of the day, rebels advanced inside the village of Atshan and killed a number of soldiers and officers (including a brigadier general), and recaptured Tell Sukayk hill. 16 Hezbollah fighters were killed in a second friendly-fire incident after Russian Air Force bombed their position in Idlib province, while 5 rebels (mostly field commanders) were killed in Hama.

On the 6 November, rebels recaptured Atshan, Umm Hartein, al-Hilal poultry farms, al-Naddaf poultry farms, al-Easawi checkpoints and al-Tawil hill. At least 16 soldiers and officers, as well as several rebels were killed in the clashes. The rebels continued their advance and further captured the villages of Qubaybat Abu al Huda, Tell Swan hill and Mantana in the Hama countryside while the Alawite village of Maan was besieged from the north and east. Later, Syrian troops in coordination with their allies reportedly captured the villages of Al-Kareem, Ramleh, Qabr Fidah and Al-Ashrafiyah after they reportedly secured Safsafa in the Al-Ghaab Plains.

On the 9 November, rebels captured Al-Mughayr village and the Al-'Abboud Checkpoint south of Morek. Eight rebels (including a military leader) were killed that day.

On the 10 November, NDF in coordination with the SSNP counter-attacked against the rebels and allegedly recaptured the village of Al-Mughayr, the hill Tal Al-Sakhr and Grain Silos directly south of rebel-held town of Kafr Naboudeh.

== Aftermath – Subsequent offensives ==
In mid-October 2015, concurrently with the offensive in Hama and Idlib, government forces launched a large-scale offensive in the northern Latakia countryside. By late November, they had seized 200 square kilometers of territory. The objective of the operation was to take control of rebel-held territory in the Latakia Governorate bordering Turkey.

Meanwhile, the rebels themselves launched an offensive in the northern part of Hama at the end of November, with the aim of capturing a string of villages along the highway to Damascus. After initially taking control of several villages and checkpoints, an Army counterattack recaptured all areas lost. In addition, government forces also captured Tell Huwayr hill, overlooking the town of Morek.

By mid-March 2016, the military captured over 750 square kilometers of territory in northeastern Latakia, which represented 64% of rebel territory in the province.

In mid-April, the rebels, led by Jund al-Aqsa and the Turkistan Islamic Party in Syria, started a new offensive to retake areas they had previously lost in the al-Ghab Plain, exploding a car bomb at a grain silos near the village of Mansura. Concurrently, an assault was launched in Latakia province where the rebels captured half of the Qalat Mountains and the village of al-Bayda. A subsequent Army counter-attack reversed all rebel gains in Latakia. One week later, the rebels once again launched an offensive in both the al-Ghab Plain and the Latakia mountains. In Latakia, they advanced in the area of three villages before being pushed back. In the al-Ghab Plain, they captured the village of Khirbat Al-Naqous and contested the village of Haqoura, before being repelled from Haqoura.

On the 29 August 2016, Jund al-Aqsa suicide bombers and the FSA, led by the Army of Glory, stormed and captured the town of Halfaya in northern Hama. The rebels also took 3 more villages in the vicinity. The Syrian Air Force responded by bombing rebel outposts in the area, which killed more than 20 rebels, according to SOHR.

== See also ==
- Russia–Syria–Iran–Iraq Coalition
