= Northwestern Syria offensive =

Northwestern Syria offensive may refer to:

- Northwestern Syria offensive (April–June 2015) or Battle of Victory
- Al-Ghab offensive (July–August 2015), in northwestern Syria
- Northwestern Syria offensive (October–November 2015)
- Northwestern Syria campaign (October 2017–February 2018)
- Northwestern Syria offensive (April–August 2019) or Dawn of Idlib
- Northwestern Syria offensive (December 2019–March 2020) or Dawn of Idlib 2
- Northwestern Syria offensive (2024) or Deterrence of Aggression
