= Tamana al-Ghab =

Tamana al-Ghab تمانعة الغاب Tamaanat al-Ghab
- Village
- Location in Syria
- Coordinates: 35°32′6″N 36°19′3″E
- Country: Syria
- Governorate: Hama
- District: Al-Suqaylabiyah
- Subdistrict: Qalaat al-Madiq

Population (2004)
  - Total: 2,696
- Time zone: UTC+3 (AST)

Tamana al-Ghab (Arabic: تمانعة الغاب, also spelled Tamaanat al-Ghab) is a village in northern Syria, administratively part of the Hama Governorate, located northwest of Hama. It is situated in the al-Ghab plain, east of the Orontes River. It is abutted by al-Ramlah to the north and Rasif to the south with other nearby localities including center Hurriya to the southeast, al-Huwash to the east, al-Amqiyah al-Tahta to the northeast, al-Ziyarah to the north, Nabl al-Khatib to the west and Shathah to the southwest. According to the Syria Central Bureau of Statistics (CBS), Tamana al-Ghab had a population of 2,696 in the 2004 census. Its inhabitants are predominantly Sunni Muslims.

According to residents of Tamana al-Ghab, the village has been mostly abandoned in the summer of 2012 after an attack that left 78 killed. According to the survivors the killing were carried out by the shabiha, a pro-government militia taking part in the ongoing Syrian Civil War.
