= Qastun =

Qastun قسطون Kastun
- Town
- Location in Syria
- Coordinates: 35°41′5″N 36°23′28″E
- Country: Syria
- Governorate: Hama
- District: Al-Suqaylabiyah
- Subdistrict: Al-Ziyarah

Population (2004)
  - Total: 6,187
- Time zone: UTC+3 (AST)

Qastun (Arabic: قسطون), also spelled Kastun or Kustun, is a village in northern Syria, administratively part of the Hama Governorate, located northwest of Hama and 35 kilometers southwest of Idlib. It is situated in the Ghab Plain, on the eastern bank of the Orontes River. Nearby localities include al-Ziyarah to the west, Qarqur to the northwest, Farikah to the north, Maaratah to the northeast, al-Muzarah to the southeast and al-Ankawi to the south. According to the Syria Central Bureau of Statistics, Qastun had a population of 6,187 in the 2004 census, making it the largest locality in the al-Ziyarah sub-district (nahiyah).

== History ==
Qastun is identified as the ancient Aramean town of Qattun or "Qatan" of the Iron Age. It is listed in an Assyrian text from Kultepe. The site of the ancient town is about 16 hectares and is spread between the two parts of Qastun i.e. Qastun al-Gharbi and Qastun al-Sharqi. The latter sits on an elevation 25 meters above the surrounding territory alongside the Qastun River.

The Syrian geographer Yaqut al-Hamawi visited Qastun during Ayyubid rule in 1225, noting that it was "a fortress that was in the district of Ar Ruj in the Halab (Aleppo) Province." During the conflict between the Mamluks (successors to the Ayyubids) and a Mongol-Armenian alliance, an elite Mongol force of some 1,500 soldiers raided Qastun in 1271, massacring and plundering its Turkoman inhabitants. In the Spring of 1298, a Mamluk army led by al-Muzaffar III Mahmud, the Ayyubid vassal of Hama, launched a campaign to conquer Armenian-held Cilicia, but only reached Qastun, before being recalled to Aleppo.

=== Modern era ===
When the nearby Zeyzoun Dam collapsed in June 2002, floods destroyed and damaged hundreds of houses in Qastun and the nearby villages of Qarqur, al-Ziyarah and Zeizoun.

According to the Syrian Observatory for Human Rights, a man was shot dead at a security checkpoint in Qastun on 4 September 2012, during the ongoing Syrian civil war. According to an opposition activist from Hama, 25 children were killed by shooting or stabbing in Qastun and nearby al-Aqbayr on 6 June 2012 by pro-government forces.

== Bibliography ==
- Amitai-Preiss, Reuven (2005). Mongols and Mamluks: The Mamluk-Ilkhanid War, 1260-1281. Cambridge University Press. ISBN 0521522900.
- Lipinsky, Edward (2000). The Aramaeans: Their Ancient History, Culture, Religion. Peeters Publishers. ISBN 9042908599.
- Stewart, Angus Donal (2001). The Armenian Kingdom and the Mamluks: War and Diplomacy During the Reigns of Hetʻum II (1289-1307). BRILL. ISBN 9004122923.
- le Strange, Guy (1890), Palestine Under the Moslems: A Description of Syria and the Holy Land from A.D. 650 to 1500, Committee of the Palestine Exploration Fund
