= Al Qahirah =

Al Qahirah may refer to:

- Cairo, the capital of Egypt, known in Arabic as Al Qahirah (القاهرة)
- Al Qahirah Governorate, a governorate of Egypt
- Al-Qahirah, Hama, a village in Qalaat al-Madiq Subdistrict, Hama, Syria
- Al-Qahira, Syria or al-Safa, a village in Ziyarah Subdistrict, Hama, Syria
- An ancient name for Mars, the fourth planet from the Sun
