= Zayzun =

Zayzun, also spelled Zeizun or Zeyzoun may refer to the following places in Syria:

- Zayzun, Daraa, a village in southern Syria
- Zayzun, Hama, a village in north-central Syria
- Zeyzoun Dam, a dam near Zayzun, Hama.
