= Al-Amqiyah Tahta =

Al-Amqiyah al-Tahta العمقية تحتا
- Village
- Location in Syria
- Coordinates: 35°34′22″N 36°22′55″E
- Country: Syria
- Governorate: Hama
- District: Al-Suqaylabiyah
- Subdistrict: Al-Ziyarah

Population (2004)
  - Total: 3,300
- Time zone: UTC+3 (AST)

Al-Amqiyah al-Tahta (Arabic: العمقية تحتا) is a village in northern Syria, administratively part of the Hama Governorate, located northwest of Hama. It is situated in the Ghab Plain Nearby localities include al-Huwash to the south, Nabl al-Khatib to the southwest, Farikah to the west, al-Ziyarah to the northwest and al-Ankawi to the north. According to the Syria Central Bureau of Statistics, al-Amqiyah al-Tahta had a population of 3,300 in the 2004 census.
