= Tamana =

Tamana may refer to:

== Places ==
- Tamana, Kiribati, an island
- Tamana, Kumamoto, a city in Kumamoto Prefecture, Japan
- Tamana, Wallis and Futuna, a village
- Tamana, Kyushu, City in Kyushu, Japan
- Tamana District, Kumamoto, a district located in Kumamoto Prefecture, Japan
- Tamana al-Ghab, Village in Hama, Syria

== Other uses ==
- Tamana Airport, an Airport in Kiribati
- Tamana Station, Railway station in Tamana, Kumamoto Prefecture, Japan
- Tamana Girls High School, High school (girls) school in Japan

== People ==
- Tamana Zaryab Paryani, Afghan journalist and women's rights activist

== See also ==
- Tamana (NGO), an Indian non profit organization
- Tamana Caves, a cave system in Trinidad and Tobago
