= Qalaat al-Madiq =

Qalaat al-Madiq قلعة المتحرشين Kal'at al-Mudik
- Town

Arab transcription(s)
  - English: "Citadel of Strait"
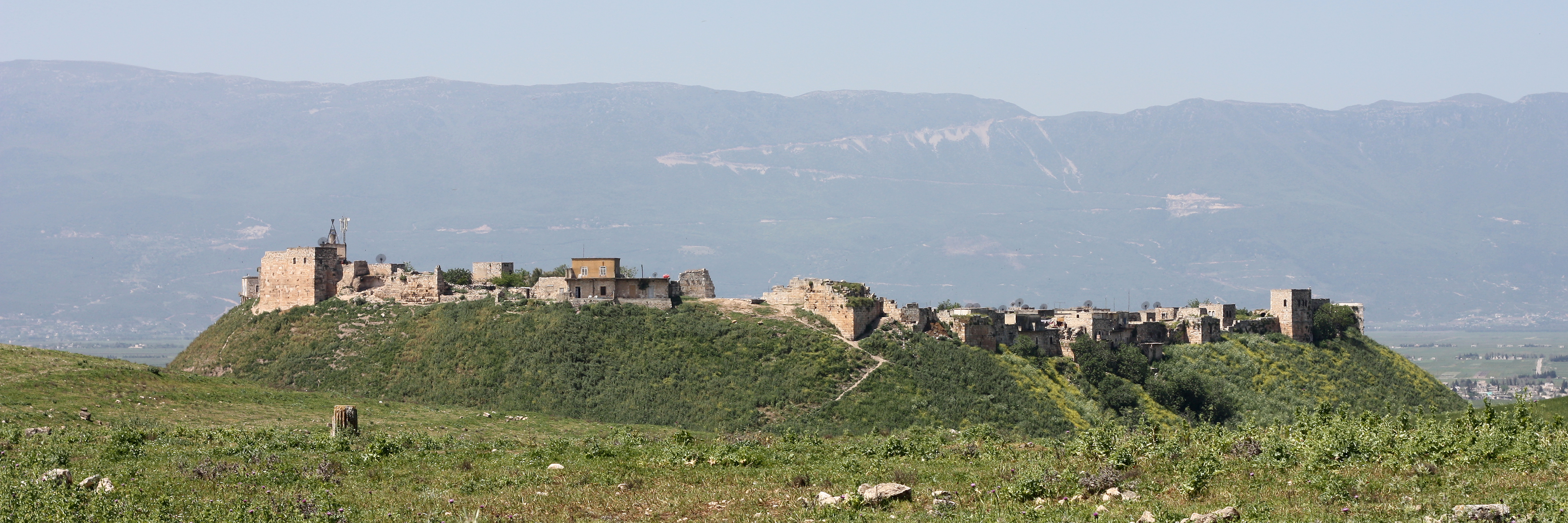
- Skyline of Qalaat al-Madiq town, 2010

- Location in Syria
- Coordinates: 35.41°N 36.39°E
- Country: Syria
- Governorate: Hama
- District: Al-Suqaylabiyah
- Subdistrict: Qalaat al-Madiq

Population (2004)
  - Total: 12,925
- Time zone: UTC+3 (AST)

Qalaat al-Madiq (Arabic: قلعة المضيق also spelled Kal'at al-Mudik or Qal'at al-Mudiq; also known as Afamiyya or Famiyyah) is a town and medieval fortress in northwestern Syria, administratively part of the Hama Governorate, located northwest of Hama. It is situated in the al-Ghab plain, on the eastern bank of the Orontes River. Nearby localities include the district center al-Suqaylabiyah to the south, Bureij and Karnaz to the southeast, Kafr Nabudah to the east, al-Huwash to the north, Huwayjah al-Sallah and Shathah to the northwest and Al-Tuwayni and Ennab to the west. According to the Syria Central Bureau of Statistics (CBS), Qalaat al-Madiq had a population of 12,925 in the 2004 census. It is the administrative center and second largest locality in the Qalaat al-Madiq nahiyah ("subdistrict") which consisted of 40 localities with a collective population of 85,597 in 2004. The town's inhabitants are predominantly Sunni Muslims.

Qalaat al-Madiq is the site of the ancient city of Apamea, the ruins of which are located just east of the town. The modern fortress, after which the town was named, was built during Muslim rule in the 12th century. It is still inhabited by townspeople. The Syrian Armed Forces retook this town from rebels during the May 2019 Hama offensive.

== History ==
=== Ancient period ===
The area may have been associated with the Late Bronze Age kingdom of Niya. German archaeologist Peter Pfälzner identified the site of modern Qalaat al-Madiq as a possible location of the kingdom's capital, although the exact location of Niya remains uncertain.

=== Greco-Roman period ===
Apamea was founded by the Seleucids in the 3rd-century BCE and was later conquered by the Romans who significantly built up the city. During the Byzantine-Sassanid War in the early 7th century, Apamea was entirely destroyed by the Sassanid forces of Khosrau II. Heraclius defeated the Persians and in a negotiation between him and Sassanid general Shahrvaraz, Syria reverted to Byzantine control.

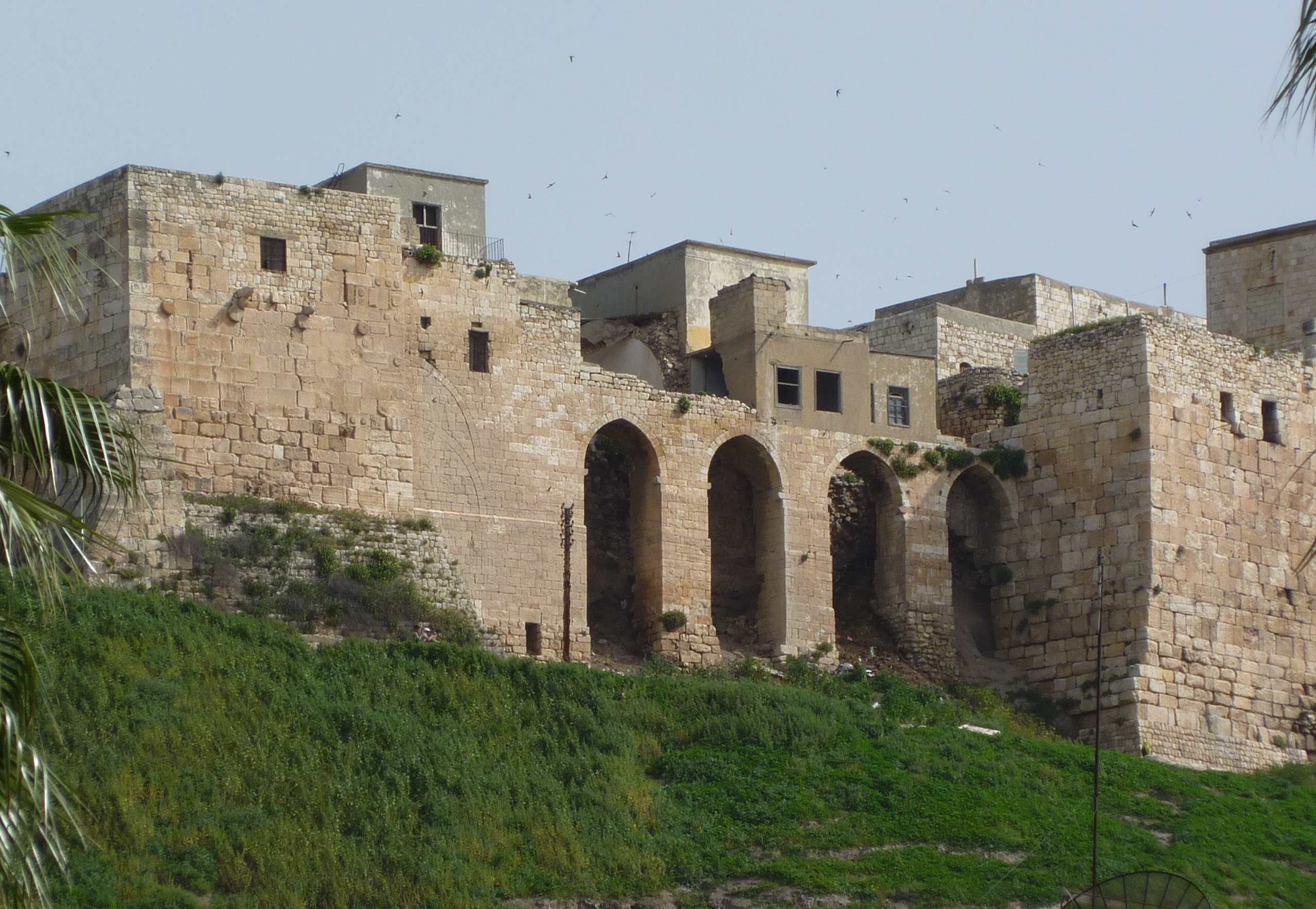
View of the Qalaat al-Madiq fortress, 2010

=== Islamic era ===
In 634, during the Caliphate of Abu Bakr, Muslim forces began their conquest of the Levant, besieging and capturing Emesa by 636. With this major Byzantine stronghold captured, along with a number of other towns in the vicinity, Apamea surrendered to the army of Abu Ubaidah ibn al-Jarrah in 638, during the Caliphate of Umar ibn al-Khattab. According to the 9th-century Muslim chronicler al-Baladhuri, Apamea's inhabitants greeted the Muslim army festively, and accepted the imposition of jizya and land taxes. By the end of the year, the entire Levant came under Muslim rule. Apamea became known as Afamiyya or Famiyyah by the Muslims during the medieval era. In 891 Arab geographer al-Yaqubi visited Afamiyya, noting that it consisted of the ruins of an "ancient Greek city ... situated on a large lake." In 998 the Byzantines besieged Afamiyya, then held by the Fatimids, but Egyptian reinforcements relieved the citadel and decisively defeated the Byzantine forces on 19 July.

In 1106 the citadel of Afamiyya (Qal'at al-Madiq), which overlooked the ancient ruins, was purchased by the Nizari Isma'ilis (also known as the Assassins) under the leadership of Abu Tahir al-Sa'igh, making it the first castle to be acquired by the group in the Levant. The place had been mostly inhabited by Isma'ilis prior to its purchase from the Fatimid-appointed Egyptian lord who governed it. Abu Tahir was encouraged by Ridwan, the Seljuk ruler of Aleppo, to take the fortress, believing the Ismailis would be more ambitious in strengthening its defenses against the Crusaders of Antioch. However, they were ousted a few months later by the Crusaders under the leadership of Tancred of Antioch in what was likely the first military confrontation between the Ismailis and the Crusaders. Initially, Tancred besieged the fortress and subsequently made terms with the Ismailis in return for tribute, but later captured it in a second assault. The Isma'ilis and Abu Tahir fled to Aleppo for refuge, but were later executed by Alp Arslān al-Akhras, Ridwan's son and successor, on orders from the Seljuk sultan and amid public resentment of the Isma'ilis.

According to his own memoirs, Usama ibn Munqidh led a small force from Shaizar, together with several Bedouin raiders, to launch an attack against the Crusader garrison in Afamiya and to plunder its cultivable lands, in 1119. By 1149, Afamiyya was once again under Muslim control. In 1154 an earthquake severely damaged Afamiyya along with Shaizar and Kafr Tab. During the reign of the Zengid ruler Nur ad-Din (1146–1174), the modern Qalaat al-Madiq fortress was constructed.

In the 1220s, Syrian geographer Yaqut al-Hamawi wrote that Afamiyya was the center of a district that was part of the larger Hims Province. In the early 14th century, Abu'l Fida noted that Afamiyya was part of the district of Shaizar.

=== Ottoman era ===
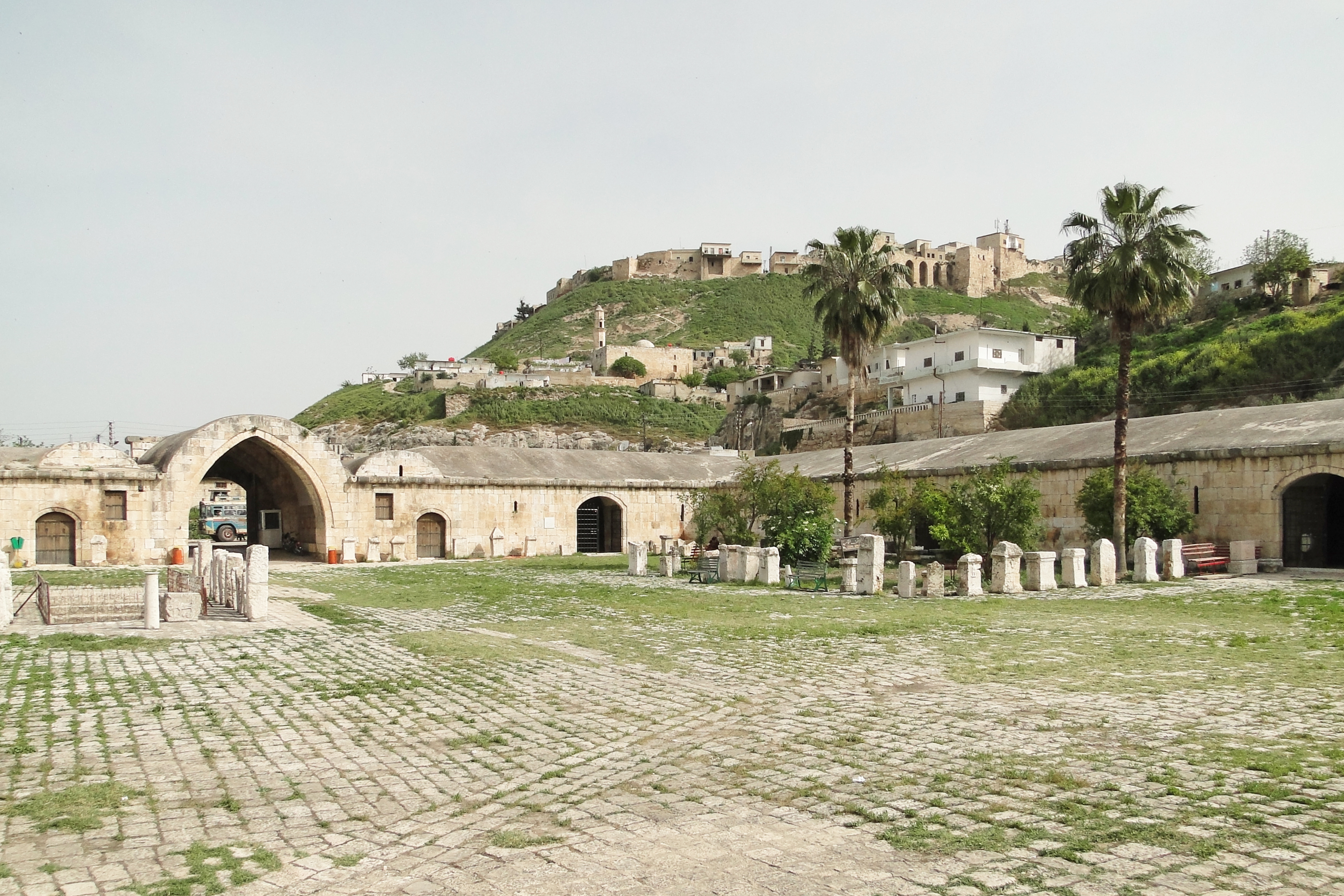
View of the Ottoman caravansary (khan) at Qalaat al-Madiq, 2010

Qalaat al-Madiq was part of Eyalet Aleppo ("Province of Aleppo") in the early 19th century. In 1811 the fortified town, which virtually guarded the entrance to the al-Ghab plain, was commandeered by Mulla Isma'il, an autonomous Kurdish warlord who rebelled against the Ottoman authorities in Syria after falling from their grace. The imperial janissary contingent in Qalaat al-Madiq had evacuated the fortress after its takeover by Mulla Isma'il. Together with Ariha and Jisr al-Shughur, both of which were also controlled by autonomous lords, the three towns formed a triangle where rebellious tribes, particularly the Mawali, and aghawat ("lords") could find safe haven from the authorities.

In the late 19th century the village was located within the walls of the fortress and its inhabitants were impoverished Bedouins.

=== Modern era ===
In the early 20th century the citadel was the only part of Qalaat al-Madiq that was inhabited. However, currently the area of town has expanded significantly, occupying the hillside areas west and south of the citadel, along the main road towards al-Suqaylabiyah.

During the ongoing Syrian Civil War, anti-government rebels gained control over much of the town, but the Syrian Army has maintained its position in the fortress, which overlooks the town. In September 2011 the police were evicted from the town by the rebels there. Services are provided to Qalaat al-Madiq's residents by rebel groups in the town, the largest of which is Suqour al-Ghab faction which fights under the banner of the Free Syrian Army. In March 2012 Qalaat al-Madiq was shelled and targeted by heavy fire for a successive 17 days by the Syrian Army in an attempt to oust rebel forces. On 28 March the army entered the town, but were unable to take full control of it. Clashes resulted in the deaths of five rebels, four army soldiers and four civilians according to the Syrian Observatory for Human Rights.

Since the March clashes, there has been a relative ceasefire between the two sides, with a few incidents where the army has allegedly attacked demonstrations, which have continued in Qalaat al-Madiq, as of late November 2012. The protests are not solely against the government, and are sometimes directed against the rebels, mostly to demand better services. A small number of people from the nearby Christian city of al-Suqaylabiyah have occasionally participated in demonstrations in Qalaat al-Madiq. The fortress was under control of the Free Syrian Army, mostly composed of Syrian Sunni Muslims, by 2012. As of early 2016, the al-Nusra Front controlled the fortress. In October of 2016, it was used as a waypoint for 1,287 people (about half of them rebel fighters), who had agreed to leave Al-Hamah and Qudsaya in exchange for safe passage to rebel controlled territory. It was retaken by the Syrian Government in May 2019, during the 2019 Northwestern Syria offensive.

On 30 November 2024, HTS rebels captured the city from the Syrian Army during the Hama offensive However after a counter attack the Syrian Arab Army was able to recapture it. The victory was short-lived as Bashar Al-Assad fled the country on 8 December 2024.

== See also ==
- List of castles in Syria

== Bibliography ==
- Ahmad ibn Yahya, al-Baladhuri (1916). The Origins of the Islamic State: Translated by Phillip Khuri Hitti. Columbia University Press.
- Bell, Gertrude Lowthian (1907). Syria: The Desert & the Sown. E. P. Dutton and Company.
- Bury, J. B. The Cambridge Medieval History. Vol. 1–5. Plantagenet Publishing.
- Carter, Terry John (2008). Syria & Lebanon 3. Lonely Planet. ISBN 978-1741046090.
- Douwes, Dick (2000). The Ottomans in Syria: a history of justice and oppression. I.B. Tauris. ISBN 1860640311.
- Usama, Ibn Munqidh (2000). An Arab-Syrian Gentleman and Warrior in the Period of the Crusades: Memoirs of Usāmah Ibn-Munqidh (Kitāb Al-Iʻtibār); Translated from the Original Manuscript by Philip K. Hitti. Columbia University Press. ISBN 0231121245.
- Moosa, Matti (1987). Extremist Shiites: The Ghulat Sects. Syracuse University Press. ISBN 0-8156-2411-5.
- Joshua, Prawer (1972). The Crusaders' kingdom: European colonialism in the Middle Ages. Praeger. ISBN 9781842122242.
- Socin, Albert (1906). Palestine and Syria with the chief routes through Mesopotamia and Babylonia: Handbook for Travellers. Karl Baedeker. "Birin Hama."
- le Strange, Guy (1890). Palestine Under the Moslems: A Description of Syria and the Holy Land from A.D. 650 to 1500. Committee of the Palestine Exploration Fund.
- Tonghini, Cristina (2011). Shayzar I: The Fortification of the Citadel. BRILL. ISBN 978-9004217362.
- Treadgold, Warren (1997). A History of the Byzantine State and Society. Stanford University Press.
- Willey, Peter; Institute of Ismaili Studies (2005). Eagle's nest: Ismaili castles in Iran and Syria. I.B.Tauris. ISBN 978-1-85043-464-1.
