= Ein Jorjin =

Ein Jorjin عين جورين
- Village
- Location in Syria
- Coordinates: 35.614508°N 36.255256°E
- Country: Syria
- Governorate: Hama
- District: Al-Suqaylabiyah District
- Subdistrict: Shathah Subdistrict

Population (2004)
  - Total: 988
- Time zone: UTC+3 (AST)
- City Qrya Pcode: C3174

Ein Jorjin (Arabic: عين جورين) is a Syrian village located in Shathah Subdistrict in Al-Suqaylabiyah District, Hama. According to the Syria Central Bureau of Statistics (CBS), Ein Jorjin had a population of 988 in the 2004 census.
