= Hawash =

Hawash or Huwash could refer to the following places:

- Al-Huwash, Homs Governorate, a Syrian village in Homs Governorate
- Al-Hawash, Hama, a Syrian village in Hama Governorate
