= Marana, Hama =

Marana, Hama مرانة
- Village
- Country: Syria
- Governorate: Hama
- District: Al-Suqaylabiyah District
- Subdistrict: Al-Ziyarah Nahiyah

Population (2004)
  - Total: 308
- Time zone: UTC+3 (AST)
- City Qrya Pcode: N/A

Marana, Hama (Arabic: مرانة) is a Syrian village located in Al-Ziyarah Nahiyah in Al-Suqaylabiyah District, Hama. According to the Syria Central Bureau of Statistics (CBS), Marana, Hama had a population of 308 in the 2004 census.
