= Qalidin =

Coordinates: 35.6133°N 36.3856°E

Qalidin قليدين
- Village
- Location in Syria
- Country: Syria
- Governorate: Hama
- District: Al-Suqaylabiyah District
- Subdistrict: Al-Ziyarah Nahiyah

Population (2004)
  - Total: 3,636
- Time zone: UTC+3 (AST)
- City Qrya Pcode: C3167

Qalidin (Arabic: قليدين) is a Syrian village located in Al-Ziyarah Nahiyah in Al-Suqaylabiyah District, Hama. According to the Syria Central Bureau of Statistics (CBS), Qalidin had a population of 3636 in the 2004 census. It is full of foids.
