= Haydariyeh =

Haydariyeh الحيدرية
- Village
- Location in Syria
- Coordinates: 35.473829°N 36.257501°E
- Country: Syria
- Governorate: Hama
- District: Al-Suqaylabiyah District
- Subdistrict: Shathah Subdistrict

Population (2004)
  - Total: 2,554
- Time zone: UTC+3 (AST)
- City Qrya Pcode: C3175

Haydariyeh (Arabic: الحيدرية) is a Syrian village located in Shathah Subdistrict in Al-Suqaylabiyah District, Hama. According to the Syria Central Bureau of Statistics, Haydariyeh had a population of 2,554 in the 2004 census.
