= Mashik =

Mashik مشيك Mshik
- Village
- Location in Syria
- Coordinates: 35°42′43″N 36°19′56″E
- Country: Syria
- Governorate: Hama
- District: Suqaylabiyah
- Subdistrict: Ziyarah

Population (2004)
  - Total: 311
- Time zone: UTC+3 (AST)
- City Qrya Pcode: N/A

Mashik (Arabic: مشيك, also spelled Mshik, Msheek or Al-Mashik) is a Syrian village located in the Ziyarah Subdistrict of the al-Suqaylabiyah District in Hama Governorate. According to the Syria Central Bureau of Statistics (CBS), Mashik had a population of 311 in the 2004 census.

== Syrian Civil War ==
The settlement was the site of intense fighting during the Al-Ghab offensive in August 2015. On 6 August 2024, least one civilian was killed and four others injured when a house was struck by a guided missile.
