= Duqmaq =

Duqmaq دقماق
- Village
- Location in Syria
- Coordinates: 35°24′29″N 36°27′37″E
- Country: Syria
- Governorate: Hama
- District: Suqaylabiyah
- Subdistrict: Ziyarah

Population (2004)
  - Total: 1,042
- Time zone: UTC+3 (AST)
- City Qrya Pcode: C3156

Duqmaq (Arabic: دقماق, also spelled Dukmak or Doqmaq) is a Syrian village located in the Ziyarah Subdistrict of the al-Suqaylabiyah District in Hama Governorate. According to the Syria Central Bureau of Statistics (CBS), Duqmaq had a population of 1,042 in the 2004 census. Its inhabitants are predominantly Sunni Muslims.
