= Duwayr al-Akrad =

Duwayr al-Akrad دوير الأكراد
- Village
- Location in Syria
- Coordinates: 35°43′17″N 36°15′42″E
- Country: Syria
- Governorate: Hama
- District: Suqaylabiyah
- Subdistrict: Ziyarah

Population (2004)
  - Total: 814
- Time zone: UTC+3 (AST)
- City Qrya Pcode: C3158

Duwayr al-Akrad (Arabic: دوير الأكراد transliteration: duwayr al-’akrād) is a Syrian village located in the Ziyarah Subdistrict of the al-Suqaylabiyah District in Hama Governorate. According to the Syria Central Bureau of Statistics (CBS), the village had a population of 814 in the 2004 census. As of 11 February 2025, the village was uninhabited.
