= Qarqur =

Qarqur Arabic: قرقور Karkour
- Village
- Location in Syria
- Coordinates: 35°44′37″N 36°19′7″E
- Country: Syria
- Governorate: Hama
- District: Al-Suqaylabiyah
- Subdistrict: Al-Ziyarah

Population (2004)
  - Total: 2,356
- Time zone: UTC+3 (AST)

Qarqur (Arabic: قرقور, also spelled Qarqar or Karkour) is a village in northern Syria, administratively part of the Hama Governorate, located northwest of Hama. It is situated in the al-Ghab plain, on the eastern bank of the Orontes River. Nearby localities include Jisr al-Shughur 6 kilometers to the north, Farikah to the northeast, Qastun to the southeast, al-Ziyarah 7 kilometers to the south, Sirmaniyah to the southwest and al-Najiyah to the northwest. According to the Syria Central Bureau of Statistics, Qarqur had a population of 2,356 in the 2004 census, making it the largest locality in the al-Ziyarah sub-district (nahiyah).

Qarqur is situated one kilometer west of the archaeological site of Tell Qarqur, which is also on the eastern bank of the Orontes River.

== History ==
Qarqur, or the nearby tell ("artificial mound"), is identified with the Aramean town of Qarqara which was captured in battle by Assyrian emperor Shalmaneser III in 853 BCE. The town was later burned down by Assyrian emperor Sargon II in 720 BCE. Archaeological findings from excavations in 1993 indicate that Tell Qarqur had been settled from the Early Bronze Age through the Iron Age with gaps of no settlement in between.

Tell Qarqur continued to be inhabited through the Byzantine period (late 4th-6th centuries CE), early Islamic rule (7th-11th centuries), the Crusader period (12th-century), until Ayyubid rule (12th-13th centuries.) Coins from the Crusader and Arab and Muslim periods were discovered on the site, as well as some pieces of Mamluk-era pottery. Muslim rule continued in the modern settlement of Qarqur on the eastern bank of the Orontes.

=== Modern era ===
In 1953 the Syrian government commenced what was known as the "Ghab Project" to drain the waters of the al-Ghab plain in order to sufficiently distribute water from the Orontes River to the various communities of the area. Of the infrastructural works included in the project, was the construction of a dam at Qarqur between 1963-1965. The Qarqur Dam blocks the Orontes on one side, while it supplies water to the other side when necessary. However, it lacks an artificial basin.

When the nearby Zeyzoun Dam collapsed, mass flooding resulted in hundreds of homes being damaged and destroyed in Qarqur, al-Ziyarah, Zaizoun and Qastun.

==== Syrian Civil War ====
On 22 October 2023, 6 civilians were killed in SAA artillery attacks in the village.

== Bibliography ==
- Lipinsky, Edward (2000). The Aramaeans: Their Ancient History, Culture, Religion. Peeters Publishers. ISBN 9042908599.
- Stewart, Angus Donal (2001). The Armenian Kingdom and the Mamluks: War and Diplomacy During the Reigns of Hetʻum II (1289-1307). BRILL. ISBN 9004122923.
- le Strange, Guy (1890). Palestine Under the Moslems: A Description of Syria and the Holy Land from A.D. 650 to 1500. Committee of the Palestine Exploration Fund. p. 493. "Lajjun Guy le Strange."
