= Hawijat al-Sallah =

Hawijat al-Sallah حويجة السلة
- Village
- Location in Syria
- Coordinates: 35°26′4″N 36°21′19″E
- Country: Syria
- Governorate: Hama
- District: Al-Suqaylabiyah
- Subdistrict: Qalaat al-Madiq

Population (2004)
  - Total: 3,134
- Time zone: UTC+3 (AST)

Hawijat al-Sallah (Arabic: حويجة السلة) is a village in northern Syria, administratively part of the Hama Governorate, located north of Hama. It is situated in the Ghab Plain. Nearby localities include subdistrict center Qalaat al-Madiq to the southeast, Kafr Nabudah to the east, al-Huwash to the north, Shathah to the northwest and Inab to the west. According to the Syria Central Bureau of Statistics (CBS), Hawijat al-Sallah had a population of 3,134 in the 2004 census.
