= Al-'Amrah =

Al-'Amrah العامرة
- Village
- Country: Syria
- Governorate: Hama
- District: Al-Suqaylabiyah District
- Subdistrict: Al-Ziyarah Nahiyah

Population (2004)
  - Total: 575
- Time zone: UTC+3 (AST)
- City Qrya Pcode: N/A

Al-'Amrah (Arabic: العامرة al-‘āmrah) is a Syrian village located in Al-Ziyarah Subdistrict in Al-Suqaylabiyah District, Hama. According to the Syrian Central Bureau of Statistics (CBS), the village had a population of 575 in the 2004 census.
