= Naur Jurin =

Na'ur Jurin ناعور جورين
- Village
- Location in Syria
- Coordinates: 35°38′22″N 36°15′56″E
- Country: Syria
- Governorate: Hama
- District: Suqaylabiyah
- Subdistrict: Shathah

Population (2004)
  - Total: 1,439
- Time zone: UTC+3 (AST)
- City Qrya Pcode: C3185

Na'ur Jurin (Arabic: ناعور جورين) is a village in northern Syria located in the Shathah Subdistrict of the al-Suqaylabiyah District in Hama Governorate. According to the Syria Central Bureau of Statistics (CBS), Na'ur Jurin had a population of 1,439 in the 2004 census. Its inhabitants are predominantly Alawites.
