= Al-Safsafah, Hama =

Al-Safsafah الصفصافة Sefsafa
- Village
- Location in Syria
- Coordinates: 35°41′30″N 36°16′26″E
- Country: Syria
- Governorate: Hama
- District: Suqaylabiyah
- Subdistrict: Ziyarah

Population (2004)
  - Total: 676
- Time zone: UTC+3 (AST)
- City Qrya Pcode: C3153

Al-Safsafah (Arabic: الصفصافة) is a Syrian village located in the Ziyarah Subdistrict of the al-Suqaylabiyah District in Hama Governorate. According to the Syria Central Bureau of Statistics (CBS), al-Safsafah had a population of 676 in the 2004 census. Its inhabitants are predominantly Alawites.
