= Mashta Mahfuz =

Mashta Mahfoz مشتى محفوظ
- Village
- Location in Syria
- Coordinates: 35.465528°N 36.255441°E
- Country: Syria
- Governorate: Hama
- District: Al-Suqaylabiyah District
- Subdistrict: Shathah

Population (2004)
  - Total: 648
- Time zone: UTC+3 (AST)
- City Qrya Pcode: N/A

Mashta Mahfoz (Arabic: مشتى محفوظ) is a Syrian village located in Shathah Subdistrict in Al-Suqaylabiyah District, Hama. According to the Syria Central Bureau of Statistics (CBS), Mashta Mahfoz had a population of 648 in the 2004 census.
