= Northwestern Syria offensive (April–June 2015) =

Battle of the Syrian civil war

Coordinates: 35.8000°N 36.3167°E

- Part of the Syrian Civil War
- Situation in Idlib Governorate as of 14 June 2015. Syrian Army control Syrian Opposition control
Date	22 April – 14 June 2015 (1 month, 3 weeks and 2 days)
Location	Idlib and Hama Governorates, Syria
Result	Army of Conquest victory: Rebels capture Jisr ash-Shughur, Ariha, and 21+ towns and villages

Belligerents
Army of Conquest; Al-Nusra Front; Jund al-Aqsa; Ahrar al-Sham; Sham Legion; Jaysh al-Sunna; Liwa al-Haqq; Ajnad ash-Sham; Ajnad al-Kavkaz; Imam Bukhari Jamaat; Jabhat Ansar al-Din; Liwa al-Muhajireen wal-Ansar; Harakat Sham al-Islam; Harakat Fajr ash-Sham al-Islamiya; (Syrian opposition) Free Syrian Army; Jaysh al-Islam; Ansar al-Sham; Turkistan Islamic Party in Syria; Junud al-Sham; Katibat al-Tawhid wal-Jihad	(Syria) Syrian Arab Republic; Hezbollah; Syrian Social Nationalist Party; Syrian Resistance; Liwa Fatemiyoun

Commanders and leaders
Abu al-Miqdad (al-Nusra commander of Idlib); Abu Ahmad † (al-Nusra military leader); Col. Jemiel Radoon (Falcons of al-Ghab commander); Abu al-Hassan (Ahrar ash-Sham senior commander); Abu Humam (Ariha region military leader); Muslim Shishani (Junud al-Sham leader); Abu Rida Al-Turkestani † (Katibat Turkistani leader)	(Syria) Maj. Gen. Wahib Haidar (commander of Idlib province) (Syria) Gen. Jamal Younis (commander of Hama province) (Syria) Maj. Gen. Mehi al-Din Mansour † (Special Forces commander) (Syria) Col. Suhayl al-Hasan (Special Forces commander) (Syria) Col. Mahamoud Subha (Hospital commander) (Syria) Mohamed Khair al-Sayyed (Governor of Idlib) (Syria) Dr. Ghassan Khalaf (Governor of Hama) (Syria) Ali Shalli (NDF leader of N/W Hama)

Units involved
(Syrian opposition) Free Syrian Army; (Syrian opposition) 13th Division; 101st Division; (Syrian opposition) Falcons of al-Ghab; Alwiya al-Furqan; Knights of Justice Brigade; Jabhat Tabhat; Sham Legion; Jaysh al-Sunna; Sultan Murad Division; (Syrian opposition) Mountain Hawks Brigade; (Syrian opposition) 1st Coastal Division; (Syrian opposition) Authenticity and Development Front; Jabhat al-Sham	Syrian Arab Armed Forces; Syrian Arab Army; (Syria) 87th Brigade; (Syria) 155th Brigade; (Syria) al-Qawat al-Nimr Brigade; (Syria) 54th Special Forces Regiment; (Syria) 106th Republican Guard Brigade; (Syria) 40th Tank Brigade; (Syria) Suqur al-Sahara; National Defense Force

Strength
9,000–12,000 fighters	5,000 (Ariha area); 1,000 (Al-Ghaab Plain); 120–150 (National Hospital)

Casualties and losses
221+ killed (SOHR claim); 700–850 killed (Syrian Army claim)	325+ killed^{[*]} and 300 captured or missing^{[**]} (SOHR claim); 100+ killed (Syrian Army claim); 500 killed (rebel claim)
- 27 civilians killed 23 prisoners & 3 friendly officers executed by the SAA and IRGC
- ^{*} 20+ executed (opposition claim)^{**} 200 soldiers and civilians in total were taken captive

The northwestern Syria offensive (April–June 2015), dubbed by the rebels as the Battle of Victory, took place in the Idlib and Hama governorates during the Syrian Civil War.

The campaign consisted of a three-pronged attack, with the two main assaults spearheaded by Ahrar al-Sham, Al-Nusra Front and other Islamist factions under the banner of the Army of Conquest, and the remaining attack force including collaboration with Free Syrian Army brigades. The commander of the FSA 13th Division stated that coordinating with other groups such as al-Nusra Front did not mean they were aligned with them. Within days, the rebels captured the city of Jisr al-Shughur and later on an Army base. The success of the campaign was attributed to better coordination between the Syrian opposition's backers. Still, the operation resulted in a high attrition rate for both sides.

== Background ==
On 24 March 2015, the newly established Army of Conquest assaulted Idlib city from three sides and, according to one tweeter, after four days of fighting the rebels captured the city and managed to besiege the towns of Kafarya and al-Fu'a. The rebels then attacked the Mastouma military camp, south of the city, but their attack was repelled. During the following days, the Syrian Army launched an offensive on the nearby town of Ariha, and seized three villages.

== The offensive ==
=== Rebel capture of Jisr al-Shughur ===
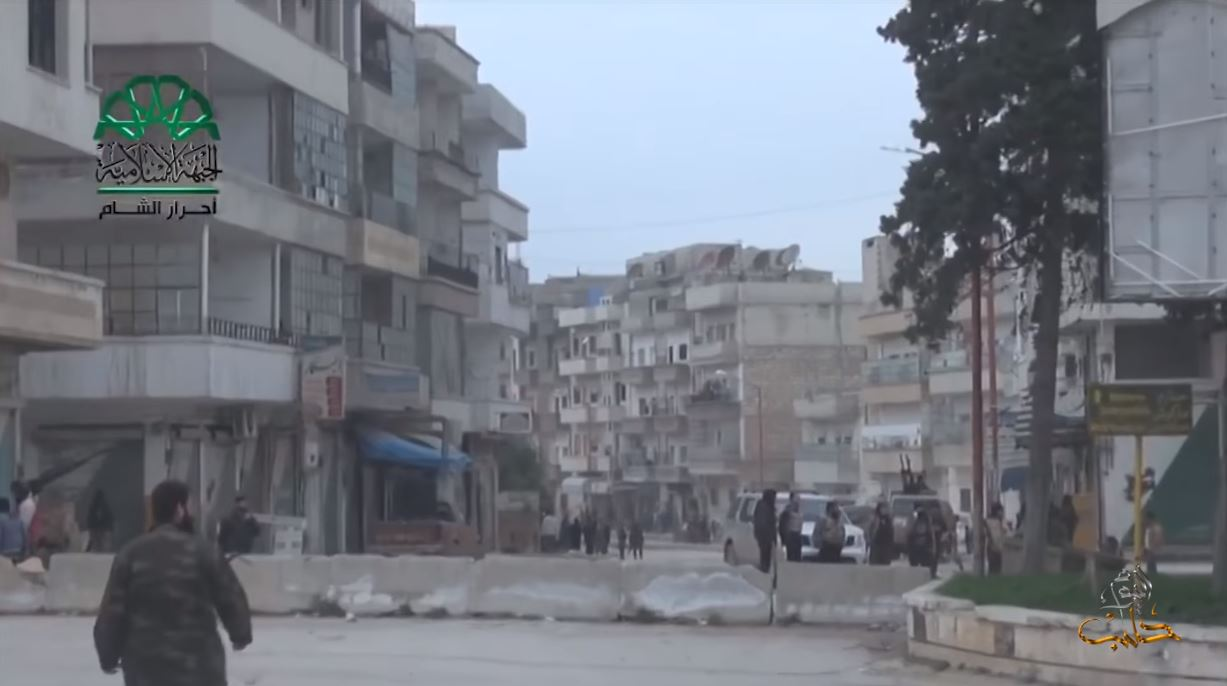
Ahrar ash-Sham fighters in Jisr al-Shughur

On 22 April, rebels (organised by the newly created Battle of Victory operations room) launched an offensive against the de facto provincial capital of Idlib governorate, Jisr al-Shughur, threatening to cut off government access to a major highway linking Idlib to Latakia. Other objectives in this offensive were the Brick Factory base (Al-Qarmeed), near Mastouma, and the Al-Ghaab Plain in Hama governorate, where FSA units were tasked with spearheading the cutting of Syrian Arab Army supply lines from the west. An al-Nusra Front suicide bomber detonated a VBIED near the Brick Factory, marking the beginning of the operation. A BMP packed with explosives was also detonated at a checkpoint in the north of Jisr al-Shughur. At the end of 23 April, despite contradictory statements, Jisr al-Shughur was still under control by government troops. Al-Nusra claimed to have sent 15 suicide bombers into the city as part of the assault. Meanwhile, in the Al-Ghaab Plain, a rebel attack on the village of Sirmaniyah was repelled. A car-bomb was detonated in the Sirmaniyah area as well.

By the next day, rebels had captured one checkpoint near the Mastouma base and four checkpoints around Jisr al-Shughur, but clashes still continued at a distance of 2–4 km near of the city. The rebels reportedly also advanced near the city's sugar plant and captured a hill near the Brick Factory base. However, the Syrian Army claimed that it "secured the city" at the cost of 13 soldiers and denied that rebels advanced near the sugar plant. Later that day, rebels captured the strategic Tal Hekmah checkpoint near the road between Jisr al-Shughur and Ariha. Meanwhile, the Syrian Air Force conducted at least 40 airstrikes in Idlib. Later, an opposition source reported that the rebels controlled the three highest points near the town of Furayqah (Tal Muntar, Tal Hamkah and Tal Mantaf), but the road between Jisr al-Shughur and Ariha was still not cut. However, government reinforcements arrived and recaptured the Tal Hekmah checkpoint.

According to the SOHR, since the start of the offensive, 43 rebels, including 13 Chechens, had been killed, government casualties numbered 30 Meanwhile, pro-government sources placed the rebel death toll at 100, with 47 soldiers dying as well. Throughout the first few days of the offensive, FSA brigades such as Fursan al-Haq and the 1st Coastal Division (including notable gunner Osama Abo Hamza) used anti-tank TOW missiles against a number of SAA armored vehicles in the al-Ghaab Plain.

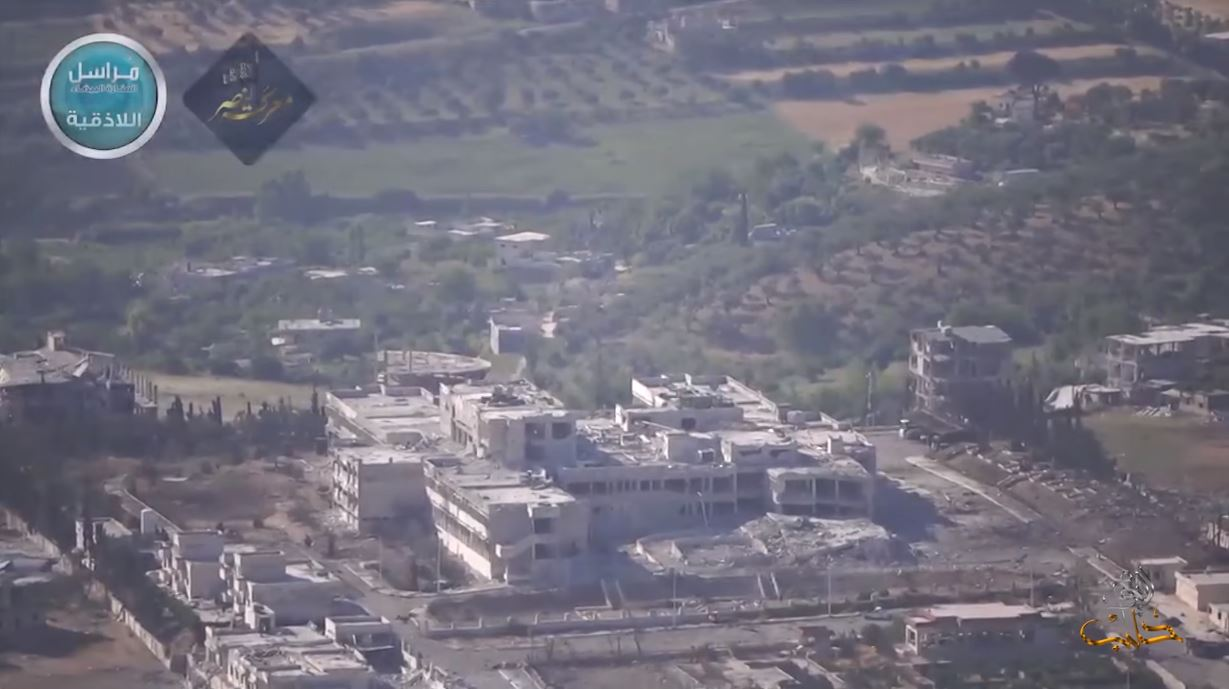
The National Hospital where the government loyalists were besieged by rebels

Early on 25 April, rebels captured the sugar plant and later, according to a tweet by a pro-government media figure, a VBIED was detonated at the Ayn Sibeel checkpoint before an al-Nusra Front-led rebel force captured most of the city, with fighting continuing and air-strikes hitting rebel positions. The national hospital and one checkpoint specifically remained under government control at this point, according to one tweeter, as clashes continued in the southwestern part of the city. Meanwhile, the Syrian Army claimed that it had captured the village of Kurin. Soon after, rebels fully secured Jisr al-Shughur, except for the hospital where soldiers were still holed up. Clashes also still continued in the vicinity of the city from the south and east. 60 bodies of government fighters were reportedly seen on the streets. During the SAA's retreat, Syrian Army intelligence executed 23 prisoners at the hospital before withdrawing. The Syrian Air Force launched 30 airstrikes around the city after its fall.

After the seizure of Jisr al-Shughur, rebels captured five villages in the Al-Ghaab Plain and seized the Alawite village of Eshtabraq near Jisr al-Shughur. After taking over Eshtabraq, rebels led by Jabhat al-Nusra reportedly carried out a massacre of over 200 people in the town, with the remaining inhabitants fleeing to neighboring regions of the Ghab plains for safety. In the coming days, 27 people, including 20 rebels were killed by government retaliatory airstrikes on the captured city, according to SOHR.

The next day, government sources claimed troops loyal to the government recaptured the sugar plant and were fighting at the entrance to the city, with one report putting the clashes at around 5 kilometers south of Jisr al-Shughur. Government sources also said the SAA recaptured a village in the Al-Ghaab Plain and opening a corridor from the sugar plant to the soldiers besieged at the hospital in Jisr al-Shughur.

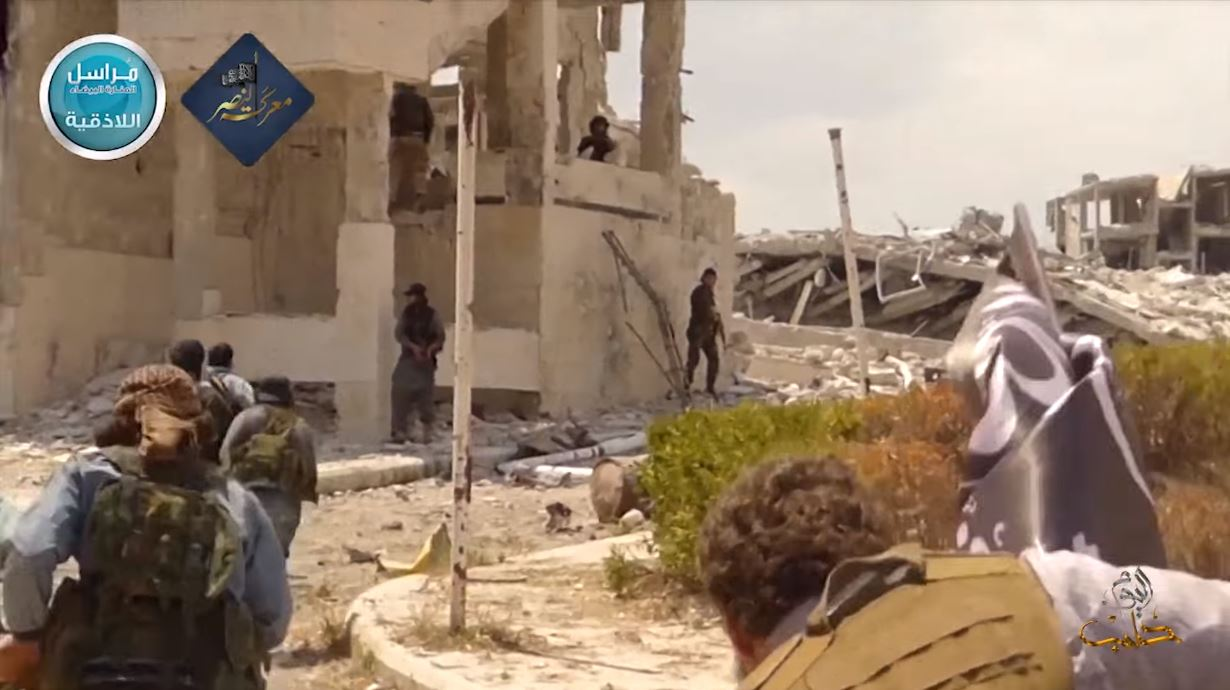
Al-Nusra Front fighters in Jisr al-Shughur

On 27 April, rebels captured the Qarmeed Brick Factory base after launching two suicide attacks. After hours of intense clashes, Syrian troops were forced to retreat after the main facility caught on fire. 19 soldiers were killed, while the Syrian Army claimed to have killed 60–80 rebels. Pro-opposition activist Cédric Labrousse reported that more than 90 were killed on both sides, while the SOHR reported 10 rebel deaths at the base, including the two suicide bombers, and seven tanks, six cannons and a large quantity of ammunition being seized by the rebels. Three SAA tanks were reportedly destroyed as well. After the fall of the Brick Factory base, 14 airstrikes struck the area.

Later, the SAA recaptured the village of Ghaniyah in the Al-Ghaab Plains, while three other villages were contested. According to pro-government sources, the SAA also recaptured a village at Jisr al-Shughur, but lost it again two days later.

As of 28 April, rebels besieged the hospital where soldiers were still continuing to fight. On the same day, a military source reported that Syrian government troops launched a counterattack on the Brick Factory in Idlib. Video footage emerged of Col. Hassan conducting a phone call to Damascus pleading for reinforcements while surrounded by his troops. According to Elijah J. Magnier from the AL RAI newspaper, Damascus had given the order to retake Jisr al-Shughur at all costs. Meanwhile, rebels blew up a bridge in an attempt to block Hama-based government fighters from reaching Jisr al-Shughur.

On 29 April, rebels seized the Musbin area, which links Ariha and Saraqeb. A military source confirmed the loss of the Musbin Quarry, but asserted that the SAA was still in control of the village and its hill. A fourth rebel attack in four days against the hospital was also repelled.

Situation in Idlib Governorate, late-April 2015

On 1 May, al-Nusra Front carried out a suicide bomb attack on the government garrison inside the national hospital. By the end of the day, the hospital was still under control by government troops. The clashes around the hospital left 14 al-Nusra fighters and "dozens" of government soldiers dead and wounded. By this point, around 5,000 soldiers were holed up at the Mastouma military base, east of Ariha, in Ariha itself, and on the hills surrounding it. The FSA Falcons of al-Gab unit blew up three bridges in an attempt to prevent their potential retreat and used TOW missiles supplied by the United States specifically for this operation.

=== Syrian Army counter-offensive ===
On 2 May, SAA units, backed by Hezbollah, launched a counter-attack and recaptured three villages in the al-Ghaab Plain: Al-Misheek, Al-Ziyarah and Tall Waset. The clashes resulted in the death of at least five rebels and five Hezbollah fighters. Military sources additionally stated that Syrian government troops seized a part of Qastoun. The aim of the counter-offensive was to hold and further reinforce supply routes towards Idlib province.

The next day, Syrian government troops advanced around Tall Ma'er tab'i, after an attempted rebel attack was repelled and captured the nearby Tall SyriaTel hill. Government forces also said they advanced from Ghanya towards Eshtabraq. In addition, pro-government sources said the SAA started an operation to encircle the rebel-held Al-Sirmaniyah.

On 4 May, the seventh rebel attack in seven days on the National Hospital was repelled, according to pro-government sources. Rebel forces continued attacking Ariha and Mastouma, as well as Ankawi and Ghab in an attempt to cut off the M4 highway linking Latakia to Idlib and Aleppo, forcing SAA units to defend a weak 30-mile W-shaped defensive line. Rebels reportedly advanced in the Hosh Msibin and Bothayna areas after they destroyed two tanks and recaptured Tal SyrianTel.

On 6 May, government forces launched an attack on the al-Alawin checkpoint and rebels positions on the hills surrounding Frikka, while the Syrian Air Force conducted more than 50 air raids in the area. Government troops (including non-Syrian militia) advanced in this area. Meanwhile, rebels claimed to have captured the last hill near Ariha, Tal Ma'ar Tab'i, while the Syrian Arab Army stated the rebel attack on the hill was repelled before nightfall.

On 7 May, the Syrian Army claimed the Tiger Forces managed to recapture the sugar plant near Jisr al-Shughur, after seizing the village of Qarta. Also, 20 airstrikes were reported while the rebels managed to destroy two tanks and another vehicle during clashes around al-Alawin checkpoint and Frikka hills, where it was later reported by the military that the Army captured both the al-Alawin checkpoint and Malta Hill. According to the SOHR, 14 government soldiers and officers, including the Syrian Brigadier General Kemal Dib, were killed in Jisr al-Shughur. The next day, government forces were confirmed to have seized three points between the al-Alawin checkpoint and Frikka hills, while 24 airstrikes were reported. Two of the locations were the villages of Frikka Al-Abeed and Sheikh Elias, while the third was reportedly Al-Karnaza.

On 9 May, government forces advanced towards Jisr al-Shughur, in an attempt to break the siege of the 250 soldiers and family members (including high-ranking officers) at the National Hospital, and came within two kilometers of the hospital. They also reportedly captured Tal Hataab, near Frikka, amid 20 airstrikes in the region.

On 10 May, the rebels launched a new assault on the National Hospital, after a second car bomb was detonated. Rebels managed to enter one of the hospital buildings during the assault, but their attack was repelled, while the Air Force conducted 33 airstrikes throughout the area, of which 22 were around the hospital. The Syrian Army advanced towards the town, but their push towards Jisr al-Shughur hospital was temporarily halted and the rebels managed to recapture three checkpoints, before they were pushed back again during the fighting that continued early into the next day. The clashes at the hospital and attacks on the relief column left 40 rebels and 32 soldiers dead. Elsewhere, the SAA captured Al-Mushayrafat and its hill (Tal Sheikh Al-Khataab), north of Frikka. At the same time, rebels took the Zeizun thermal plant in the al-Ghaab plain, after damaging several government vehicles. Later during the night, rebel forces were forced to retreat from the plant, but were still in control of the nearby village of Zeizun. The thermal plant sustained severe damage during the fighting, according to one social media poster.

On 11 May, clashes continued in and around the hospital and near the sugar plant, where rebels destroyed a tank and government forces recaptured two checkpoints. 14 airstrikes struck rebel positions throughout the day. On the same day, around 20 rebels from the FSA's 101st Division were killed after a failed attack on the village of Kafr Najd, near Ariha.

=== Renewed rebel advance and capture of Ariha ===
As of 12 May, rebels were still holding a part of the hospital, while the fighting continued in and around it and near the sugar factory. Rebels retreated from the village of Sanqarah after temporally seizing it at dawn and claimed to have killed at least 20 soldiers in the hit-and-run attack. Rebels also attacked and captured al-Kufayr village. Meanwhile, opposition sources claimed that the Syrian Brigadier General Abdel Razak Abu Khader Raml was killed. At the end of the day, the rebels launched an assault against the village of Musbin, near Mastouma, and Jabal al-Arbaeen area, near Ariha, after a tunnel bomb was detonated under the al-Fanar military checkpoint. Rebels captured the Jabal al-Arbaeen area and Musbin, while at least 17 soldiers (including three commanders) and 11 rebel fighters (including three leaders) were killed. However, government forces were able to recapture one checkpoint overlooking Ariha overnight, but eventually retreated after rebels launched a second attack the next day. According to a military source, Musbin was still contested and rebels were not in full control.

On 14 May, government forces recaptured the village of al-Kufayr, while Brig. Gen. Kemal Dib and Maj. Gen. Muheiddeine Mansour were killed in and near Jisr al-Shughur. A suicide-car bomb was destroyed near the hospital before it could reach the complex. At the end of the day, rebels recaptured large parts of Al-Mushayrafat, with fighting for the village continuing. The next day, government forces reportedly managed to recapture the al-Fanar checkpoint, near Ariha, but were unable to hold al-Kufayr, which they regained 24 hours earlier, and had to abandon it once again due to heavy rebel presence in the surrounding hills.

On 17 May, according to an opposition source, more than 2,500 rebels attacked Mastouma and the nearby Ba'ath military camp. During the attack, an VBIED was detonated near the military camp, while rebels captured al-Moqbili village and advanced in Mastouma, where they captured at least 10 checkpoints and Mastouma hill. Meanwhile, the Syrian army claimed to have advanced towards Kufayr.

On 19 May, after several days of violent clashes, rebels took control of Al-Mastumah, its military camp (which was the largest remaining Army base in Idlib in government hands) and Nihlaya after the SAA retreated towards Ariha. Syrian Army defenses "disintegrated", making Ariha endangered from the northern axis. A spokesman for Ahrar al-Sham claimed that the SAA had already begun withdrawing from Ariha as well. Government forces destroyed all warehouses with arms and ammunition before they retreated, according to one tweeter, with opposition media showing what it claimed to be footage of several destroyed and overturned army vehicles littered with dead bodies, after a convoy of retreating government troops was interdicted. The clashes led to the death of 16 rebels and 15 government fighters, while others were captured, and the destruction of a number of armored vehicles (including tanks). Several rebel attacks on Kafr Najd were repelled later that day.

On 21 May, rebels advanced towards Ariha. The next day at 8:00 am, an estimated 150–500 government forces attempted a breakout at the besieged hospital in broad daylight and fled towards the government-controlled area south of Jisr al-Shughur. Some were killed, wounded and captured under withering opposition fire, with 3 generals and a colonel killed or captured en route. Rebels claimed to have killed 208 and captured 65 government fighters during the retreat, with figures given of not more than a dozen to 55 surviving. Meanwhile, pro-government sources reported that 127 soldiers out of the garrison of 170 had successfully escaped. Journalist Robert Fisk found that "far less than half" of those who retreated from the National Hospital reached safety, with some subsequently dying of their wounds after reaching government lines. Syrian State TV declared the retreat a "victory" amid congratulations by most government supporters, while some voiced criticism. The Syrian Air Force conducted at least 22 airstrikes that day, while the SAA attempted to advance towards Jisr al-Shughur. Opposition forces took the hospital later that day.

As of 23 May, SOHR documented the death of 261 Syrian soldiers and pro-government militia, including 90 officers (one Major General, 11 Brigadier Generals, 11 Colonels and three Lieutenant Colonels), since the beginning of the offensive in and near Jisr al-Shughur. Syrian state television claimed that the armed forces killed at least 300 rebels and wounded hundreds others during a Syrian Army operation to free troops in the hospital. On the same day, the Syrian troops attacked the rebel-held the village of Sirmaniyyah in the al-Ghab plain.

Situation in Idlib Governorate, late-May 2015

On 28 May, rebels began a large assault on Ariha and were able to enter the eastern districts of the city, whilst fierce fighting continued near the town. Several hours later, opposition forces captured Ariha and Kafr Najd, as government troops retreated towards Urum al-Jawz and Muhambal on the Ariha–Jisr al-Shughur Highway. In the evening, the rebels also captured Ma'taram. At least 31 government forces were killed that day, including 13 soldiers who were executed by the rebels.

The next day, rebels captured the villages of Orm al-Joz and Ein Orm al-Joz.

=== Fighting for the Ariha–Latakia highway ===
On 4 June, the Army recaptured the villages of Tal A'our, Al-Zayadiyah and Sararif and,according to one blogger, the hills of Tall Ghazal and Tall al-Sahan. The next day, the Syrian Army advanced and seized the areas of Marj al-Zohour and the Zayzoun Dam, near the administrative border between Idlib and Hama.

On the same day, the rebels launched a large-scale attack on the Sheikh Ali hill area and gained ground in the Basanqul forest, and eventually captured the hill itself. In addition, the rebels captured five villages near Basanqul.

On 6 June, the rebels captured Basanqul and Mahambel. The rebels continued advancing that day and captured two checkpoints west of Mahambel, including the largest remaining barrier in Idlib. According to the SOHR, the Syrian Army lost 11 tanks and armoured vehicles during the new rebel assault. The fighting killed 32 soldiers and 13 rebels, according to SOHR.

By the end of 6 June, an Ahrar al-Sham spokesman claimed that the Army of Conquest controlled about 99% of Idlib province.

On 8 June, the SAAF conducted airstrikes on the village of al-Janodia, which reportedly killed 49 civilians, while Iranian officers were reported to have executed three Syrian Arab Army officers who retreated from the Mahambel and Basanqul checkpoints.

Situation in Idlib Governorate, mid-June 2015

On 13 June, the rebels launched an assault on the remaining government-held positions in Idlib, with the SOHR reporting that they captured Al-Mushayrifah, Jannat al-Qura, and Tal Sheikh Khattab, along the highway, although those locations were reported captured more than two weeks earlier. Rebels also advanced in the Sarafif area, which was recaptured by the Syrian Army on 4 June. On that day, one of the two bodyguards of Col. Suhayl al-Hasan died of his wounds, after being shot by a rebel sniper.

By the next day, the Syrian Army had regained control over the areas it lost on the previous day, after the rebels retreated under heavy airstrikes and shelling.

== Aftermath – Syrian Army retreat from the Jisr al-Shugur area ==
On 28 July, rebels launched an assault to capture the remaining areas surrounding Jisr al-Shugur. Two hours later, rebels had captured the strategic hills of Tal Khattab, Tal 'Awar and Tal Hamka; along with the towns of Frikka, Mushayrafah, Salat Al-Zuhour and Zayzoun. The Army retreated to the south in order to reinforce its positions at Tall Wassit and Tall Sheikh Elyas. The Army responded with 160 airstrikes and dozens of shells and missiles. According to the SOHR, about 90 government fighters were killed or wounded during the assault, while 37 rebels (15 non-Syrian; including a Jordanian leader) were killed.

However, three days later, the Syrian Army recaptured Ziyadia and Zezoun, including its power station. In addition, they captured the towns of Khirbat al-Naqus and Mansoura and its surrounding areas. The advances came after the Air Force had conducted more than 270 air-strikes on rebel positions over four days. The fighting had left 39 combatants dead, including 20 soldiers and 19 rebels.

== Strategic analysis ==
The Jisr al-Shughur offensive has been described as one of the "largest and most ambitious operations of the Syrian civil war" consisting of some 40 opposition groups, with the main goal being to outflank and interdict Col. Suhayl al-Hasan's Tiger forces, who were sent to attempt to push back against the 2015 Idlib offensive, which followed the opposition victory at the Second Battle of Idlib. According to Stratfor, the potential cutting off by opposition forces of the Idlib salient, where the 11th Armor Division and the Tiger Forces found themselves isolated, would perhaps result in "an even bigger catastrophe" for the Syrian Arab Army. The deployment of elite government forces such as the Tiger Forces and the Desert Falcons to Idlib from other fronts was viewed by Stratfor as a mistake that left the government highly vulnerable in the eastern part of Homs province.

Opposition forces were widely reported to be planning to move on the government's stronghold of Latakia, following the capture of Jisr al-Shughur. The reopening of the Latakia front was a focus, at the time, of Saudi Arabian policy to unite opposition factions. Analyst Charles Lister of the Brookings Doha Centre stated that "For the opposition as a whole, it would open up the route into Latakia from Idlib and Hama, which could significantly enhance any future offensive on Latakia ... That would be very dangerous for the regime", adding that the seizing of Jisr al-Shughur should be seen as part of a bigger strategy. An Ahrar al-Sham spokesperson stated: "Jisr al-Shughour is more important than Idlib itself, it is very close to the coastal area which is a regime area, the coast now is within our fire reach". As rebels advanced in early June along the Idlib–Latakia highway, fighting intensified in the Latakia District near the Jabal al Akrad mountain range, that overlooks Alawite villages close to Qardaha, the ancestral home of the Assad family.

After recent rebel victories against the government, some people began to fear a scenario where hardline rebels would swarm Damascus in the near future, despite government reassurances. AL RAI Chief International Correspondent, Elijah J. Magnier, reported that Syria was heading towards partition after recent events in Idlib. Jane's Information Group stated that the offensive threatened to show president Bashar al-Assad as "incapable even of protecting the coastal mountain areas where the Alawites (his core support base) are concentrated" and speculated Iran would not see him as the primary keeper of their interests in Syria.

In early June, a Syrian security source reported that thousands of Iranian and Iraqi fighters were being assembled; "[t]he goal is to reach 10,000 men to support the Syrian army and pro-government militias, firstly in Damascus, and then to retake Jisr al-Shughur because it is key to the Mediterranean coast and the Hama region". This came days after Iranian Quds force general Qasem Soleimani pledged that "In the coming days the world will be surprised by what we are preparing, in cooperation with Syrian military leaders", yet Soleimani was reported to be infuriated that his remarks were leaked by a Syrian official in an attempt to boost morale. The SOHR reported the arrival of 6,000 fighters from Iraq, Iran and Afghanistan.

== Reactions ==
=== Domestic reaction ===
- Ba'athist Syria - On 28 April 2015, Syria accused Turkey of providing military and logistic support to al-Nusra in their attack on Idlib, with Syrian foreign minister Walid Muallem describing the situation in Idlib as having "Zionist-American sponsorship".

=== International reaction ===
- Iran - Iranian general Qasem Soleimani was reportedly furious with Syrian military commanders when arriving in Syria to assess the opposition gains in Idlib. "Why are your heads down? [...] The people of Syria have been paying their taxes to pay your wages for precisely such a day, so that you defend them against a band of evil beasts. Why have you lost your nerve now?" he is reported to have berated them.

== See also ==
- Sinjar massacre
- November 2015 Sinjar offensive
- Siege of Kobanî
- Al-Hasakah offensive (February–March 2015)
- Salahuddin campaign (2014–15)
- Second Battle of Tikrit (March–April 2015)
- Anbar offensive (2015)
- Qalamoun offensive (May–June 2015)
- Palmyra offensive (May 2015)
- Al-Hasakah offensive (May 2015)
- Tell Abyad offensive (2015)
- Battle of Al-Hasakah (June–August 2015)
- 2015 Ramadan attacks
- Syrian Kurdish–Islamist conflict (2013–present)
- Military intervention against ISIL
  - American-led intervention in Syria
- List of wars and battles involving ISIL
- Timeline of ISIL related events
