= Ein Elhamam =

Ein Elhamam عين الحمام
- Village
- Country: Syria
- Governorate: Hama
- District: Al-Suqaylabiyah District
- Subdistrict: Al-Ziyarah Nahiyah

Population (2004)
  - Total: 734
- Time zone: UTC+3 (AST)
- City Qrya Pcode: C3152

Ein Elhamam (Arabic: عين الحمام) is a Syrian village located in Al-Ziyarah Nahiyah in Al-Suqaylabiyah District, Hama. According to the Syria Central Bureau of Statistics (CBS), Ein Elhamam had a population of 734 in the 2004 census.
