= Elzaqum =

Elzaqum الزقوم
- Village
- Location in Syria
- Coordinates: 35.627669°N 36.387105°E
- Country: Syria
- Governorate: Hama
- District: Al-Suqaylabiyah District
- Subdistrict: Al-Ziyarah Nahiyah

Population (2004)
  - Total: 913
- Time zone: UTC+3 (AST)
- City Qrya Pcode: N/A

Elzaqum (Arabic: الزقوم) is a Syrian village located in Al-Ziyarah Nahiyah in Al-Suqaylabiyah District, Hama. According to the Syria Central Bureau of Statistics (CBS), Elzaqum had a population of 913 in the 2004 census.
