= Al-Hawash =

Al-hwash may refer to:

- Al-Hawash, Hama, a village in Hama Governorate, Syria
- Al-Hawash, Homs Governorate, a village in Homs Governorate, Syria
