= Farikah =

Farikah فريكة Furaykah
- Village
- Location in Syria
- Coordinates: 35°34′30″N 36°16′13″E
- Country: Syria
- Governorate: Hama
- District: Al-Suqaylabiyah
- Subdistrict: Shathah

Population (2004)
  - Total: 2,497
- Time zone: UTC+3 (AST)

Farikah (Arabic: فريكة, also spelled Frikka, Freike, Freikeh or Furaykah) is a village in northern Syria, administratively part of the Hama Governorate, located north of Hama. It is situated in the Ghab Plain. Nearby localities include Shathah and Nabl al-Khatib to the south, al-Amqiyah Tahta and al-Ankawi to the east, al-Ziyarah to the northeast and Sirmaniyah to the north. According to the Syria Central Bureau of Statistics (CBS), Farikah had a population of 2,497 in the 2004 census. Its inhabitants are predominantly Alawites.

Government forces and rebels contested Farikah throughout July 2015.
