= Al-Sindiyana, Suqaylabiyah =

Sindyana السنديانة
- Village
- Country: Syria
- Governorate: Hama
- District: Al-Suqaylabiyah District
- Subdistrict: Al-Ziyarah Nahiyah

Population (2004)
  - Total: 117
- Time zone: UTC+3 (AST)
- City Qrya Pcode: C3151

Sindyana (Arabic: السنديانة) is a Syrian village located in Al-Ziyarah Nahiyah in Al-Suqaylabiyah District, Hama. According to the Syria Central Bureau of Statistics (CBS), Sindyana had a population of 117 in the 2004 census. As of 24 February 2025, the village is uninhabited.
