= Khirbat al-Naqus =

Khirbat al-Naqus خربة الناقوس
- Village
- Location in Syria
- Coordinates: 35.645736°N 36.325565°E
- Country: Syria
- Governorate: Hama
- District: Al-Suqaylabiyah District
- Subdistrict: Al-Ziyarah Nahiyah

Population (2004)
  - Total: 1,186
- Time zone: UTC+3 (AST)
- City Qrya Pcode: C3162

Khirbat al-Naqus (Arabic: خربة الناقوس khirbat al-nāqūs) is a Syrian village located in Al-Ziyarah Nahiyah in Al-Suqaylabiyah District, Hama. According to the Syria Central Bureau of Statistics (CBS), the village had a population of 1186 in the 2004 census.

== Syrian Civil War ==
In April 2016, Khirbat al-Naqus was attacked by Jund Al-Aqsa in an attempt to dislodge the Syrian army. Suicide bombers in explosive laden trucks participated in the attack.
