= Jurin =

Jurin جورين Joreen
- Village
- Location in Syria
- Coordinates: 35°36′54″N 36°16′2″E
- Country: Syria
- Governorate: Hama
- District: Suqaylabiyah
- Subdistrict: Shathah

Population (2004)
  - Total: 2,326
- Time zone: UTC+3 (AST)
- City Qrya Pcode: C3178

Jurin (Arabic: جورين) is a village in northern Syria, located in the Shathah Subdistrict of the Suqaylabiyah District in the Hama Governorate. According to the Syria Central Bureau of Statistics (CBS), Jurin had a population of 2,326 in the 2004 census. Its inhabitants are predominantly Alawites.
