= Shayama Chona =

Founder-President of Tamana Association

Personal details
- Born: 12 August 1942 (age 84) Rajasthan, British India
- Occupation: Educationist, Disability Rights Activist, Author; Founder and President of Tamana Association New Delhi; Ex- Principal of Delhi Public School, R. K. Puram
- Website: www.tamana.org

Shayama Chona (born 12 August 1942) is the Founder-President of Tamana Association (established. 1984) and the former Principal of Delhi Public School, R. K. Puram. In 1997, she was presented with the National Award for Individual for Best Work Done in The Cause of the Disabled. Under her leadership as President of the Governing Council, Tamana Association received the First Mother Teresa Award for its dedicated services to the intellectually impaired.

She has also been awarded the Padma Bhushan in 2008 and Padma Shri in 1999.

== Personal life ==
Tamana Association was conceived on the basis of the name, "Tamana", her daughter, who was born with cerebral palsy. The first centre, Tamana Special School was inaugurated by Her Royal Highness, Diana, Princess of Wales, on 12 February 1992.

== Awards and recognition ==
- 2008: Awarded the Padma Bhushan in 2008
- 1999: Received Padma Shri in 1999
