= Eshtabraq =

Eshtabraq اشتبرق
- Village
- Location in Syria
- Coordinates: 35°47′31″N 36°17′43″E
- Country: Syria
- Governorate: Idlib
- District: Jisr al-Shughur District
- Subdistrict: Jisr al-Shughur Nahiyah

Population (2004)
  - Total: 1,187
- Time zone: UTC+2 (EET)
  - Summer (DST): UTC+3 (EEST)
- City Qrya Pcode: C4198

Eshtabraq (Arabic: اشتبرق) is a Syrian village in Jisr al-Shughur Nahiyah in Jisr al-Shughur District, Idlib. According to the Syria Central Bureau of Statistics (CBS), it had a population of 1,187 in the 2004 census, the majority of whom are Alawites.

== History ==
On 25 April 2015, a massacre occurred in the village after the al-Qaeda-affiliated Jabhat al-Nusra and its Islamist allies in the "Army of Conquest" seized Jisr al-Shughour during their spring offensive that year. They attacked and captured the Alawite village of Eshtabraq and killed over 200 of its residents forcing the remainder to flee.
