= John Maron =

Syriac Maronite bishop and saint

Mar John Maron
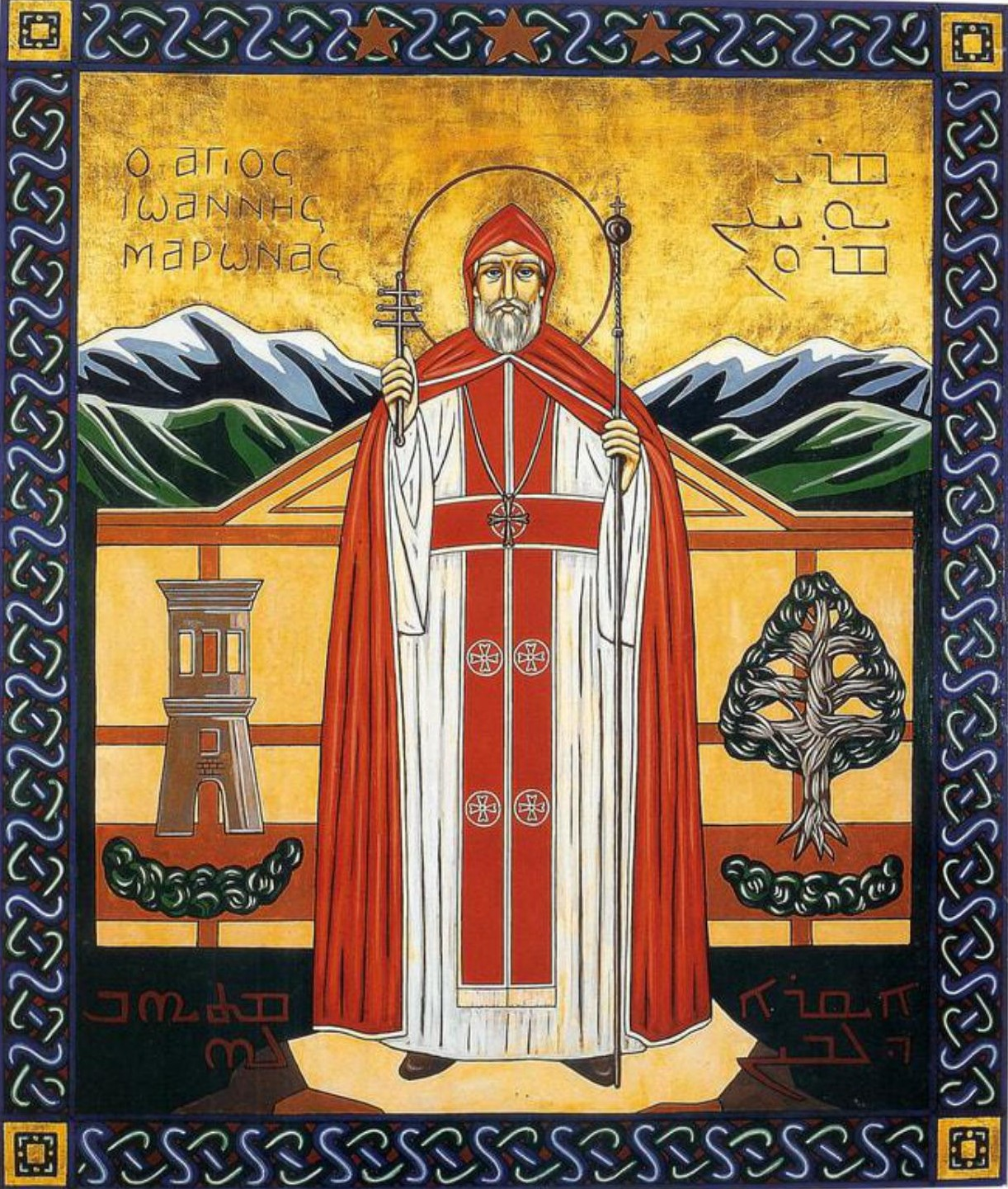

Maronite Patriarch of Antioch
- Born: 628; Sirmaniyah or Sarmin, Byzantine Empire (Modern-day Syria)
- Died: 707; Kfarhy, near Batroun
- Venerated in: Catholic Church (especially Maronite Church)
- Canonized: Pre-congregation
- Feast: March 2

John Maron (Arabic: يوحنا مارون, Youhana Maroun; Latin: Ioannes Maronus; Syriac: ܝܘܚܢܢ ܡܪܘܢ; 628, Sirmaniyah or Sarmin, Byzantine Empire – 707, Kfarhy), was a Syriac monk. and the first Maronite Patriarch. He is revered as a saint by the Catholic Church, especially the Maronite Church, and is commemorated on March 2. He died and was buried in Kfarhy near Batroun, in Lebanon, where a shrine is dedicated to him.

Jérôme Labourt, writing in the Catholic Encyclopedia says that John Maron's "very existence is extremely doubtful ... if he existed at all, it was as a simple monk". French theologian Eusèbe Renaudot similarly held doubts regarding John Maron's existence. Other scholarship has assessed John Maron as having existed and served as Maronite Patriarch when invasions by Byzantine emperor Justinian II were repulsed and the Maronite people gained a greater degree of political independence.

== Early life ==
According to tradition, John was born in Antioch, and entered the convent of Saint Maron, adopting the monastic name Yohanon Moroun. Eventually, either in 685 or between 687 and 701 he declared himself as Patriarch of Antioch for the Maronite community, which held to the teachings of the Council of Chalcedon but rejected later councils, maintaining Monothelitism. This brought him into conflict with both the Byzantine empire and the Syriac Miaphysites to the east. John is thought to have died in 707.

== Works ==
His most famous work is the Book of Direction (Ktōbō d-Huddōyē) of 680, the earliest systematic Maronite work and a foundational text for Maronite liturgy.

While true authorship is contested, the Maronite Church holds that John Maron composed three works in Syriac: one about general spirituality and faith, the other against Jacobites, and another against Nestorians.

== See also ==
- List of Maronite Patriarchs
- Maronites
- Maron
- Patriarch of Antioch

== Sources ==
- Michael Breydy: Johannes Maron. In: Biographisch-Bibliographisches Kirchenlexikon (BBKL). Band 3, Bautz, Herzberg 1992, ISBN 3-88309-035-2, Sp. 480–482.
- Siméon Vailhé, «Origines religieuses des Maronites», Échos d'Orient, t. IV, 1900–1901, n° 2, p. 96-102, et n° 3, p. 154-162.
- Michel Breydy, Jean Maron. Expose de la foi et autres opuscules. Syr. 209. CSCO (Corpus Scriptorum Christianorum Orientalium), Bd. 407, Peeters, Louvain 1988
- Britannica, The Editors of Encyclopaedia. "Honorius I". Encyclopædia Britannica, 8 Oct. 2020, https://www.britannica.com/biography/Honorius-I. Accessed 21 August 2021.
- Moosa, Matti. “The Relation of the Maronites of Lebanon to the Mardaites and Al-Jarājima.” Speculum, vol. 44, no. 4, 1969, pp. 597–608. JSTOR, www.jstor.org/stable/2850386. Accessed 21 Aug. 2021.
- Moosa, Matti (2005). The Maronites in History. New York: Gorgias Press. ISBN 1-59333-182-7.
- LILIE, RALPH-JOHANNES. “Reality and Invention: Reflections on Byzantine Historiography.” Dumbarton Oaks Papers, vol. 68, 2014, pp. 157–210. JSTOR, www.jstor.org/stable/24643758. Accessed 21 Aug. 2021.
- Britannica, The Editors of Encyclopaedia. "Maronite church". Encyclopædia Britannica, 13 Dec. 2019, https://www.britannica.com/topic/Maronite-church. Accessed 21 August 2021.

Catholic Church titles
Preceded by Theophanes of Antioch	Maronite Patriarchs of Antioch	Succeeded by Cyrrus
