= Al-Bahsa =

Al-Bahsa البحصة
- Village
- Location in Syria
- Coordinates: 35°40′46″N 36°16′33″E
- Country: Syria
- Governorate: Hama
- District: Suqaylabiyah
- Subdistrict: Ziyarah

Population (2004)
  - Total: 1,070
- Time zone: UTC+3 (AST)
- City Qrya Pcode: C3165

Al-Bahsa (Arabic: البحصة, also spelled Bahasa) is a village in northern Syria located in the Ziyarah Subdistrict of the al-Suqaylabiyah District in the Hama Governorate. According to the Syria Central Bureau of Statistics (CBS), al-Bahsa had a population of 1,070 in the 2004 census. Its inhabitants are predominantly Alawites.
