= Nubl al-Khatib =

Nubl al-Khatib نبل الخطيب Harat al-Khatib, Nubl al-Tahtani
- Village
- Location in Syria
- Coordinates: 35°32′51″N 36°15′34″E
- Country: Syria
- Governorate: Hama
- District: Suqaylabiyah
- Subdistrict: Shathah

Population (2004)
  - Total: 2,381
- Time zone: UTC+3 (AST)
- City Qrya Pcode: C3184

Nubl al-Khatib (Arabic: نبل الخطيب, also spelled Nabl al-Khatib, also known as Harat al-Khatib and Nubl al-Tahtani), is a village in northern Syria, located in the Shathah Subdistrict of the al-Suqaylabiyah District in Hama Governorate. According to the Syria Central Bureau of Statistics (CBS), it had a population of 2,381 in the 2004 census. Its inhabitants are predominantly Alawites.
