= Zilaqiat =

Zilaqiat زلاقيات
- Village
- Location in Syria
- Coordinates: 35°16′39″N 36°36′20″E
- Country: Syria
- Governorate: Hama
- District: Mahardah
- Subdistrict: Mahardah

Population (2004)
  - Total: 1,071
- Time zone: UTC+3 (AST)
- City Qrya Pcode: C3446

Zilaqiat (Arabic: زلاقيات) is a Syrian village located in the Mahardah Subdistrict of the Mahardah District in Hama Governorate. According to the Syria Central Bureau of Statistics (CBS), Zilaqiat had a population of 1,071 in the 2004 census. Its inhabitants are predominantly Sunni Muslims.

== Bibliography ==
- Robinson, E.; Smith, E. (1841). Biblical Researches in Palestine, Mount Sinai and Arabia Petraea: A Journal of Travels in the year 1838. Vol. 3. Boston: Crocker & Brewster.
