= Buwaydah, Salamiyah =

Buwayda البويضة
- Village
- Location in Syria
- Coordinates: 35.143038°N 37.045780°E
- Country: Syria
- Governorate: Hama
- District: Salamiyah District
- Subdistrict: Salamiyah Subdistrict

Population (2004)
  - Total: 174
- Time zone: UTC+3 (AST)
- City Qrya Pcode: C3220

Buwayda (Arabic: البويضة) is a Syrian village located in Salamiyah Subdistrict in Salamiyah District, Hama. According to the Syria Central Bureau of Statistics (CBS), Buwayda had a population of 174 in the 2004 census.
