= Lahaya =

Lahaya لحايا
- Village
- Location in Syria
- Coordinates: 35°20′N 36°41′E
- Country: Syria
- Governorate: Hama
- District: Hama
- Subdistrict: Suran

Population (2004)
  - Total: 486
- Time zone: UTC+3 (AST)
- City Qrya Pcode: C3034

Lahaya (Arabic: لحايا) is a Syrian village located in the Suran Subdistrict in Hama District. According to the Syria Central Bureau of Statistics (CBS), Lahaya had a population of 486 in the 2004 census.
