= Al-Ziyarah =

Al-Ziyarah الزيارة Zeyareh
- Town
- Location in Syria
- Coordinates: 35°41′21″N 36°20′18″E
- Country: Syria
- Governorate: Hama
- District: Al-Suqaylabiyah
- Subdistrict: Al-Ziyarah
- Occupation: Hay'at Tahrir al-Sham

Population (2004)
  - Total: 3,541
- Time zone: UTC+3 (AST)

Al-Ziyarah (Arabic: الزيارة, also spelled Zeyareh) is a town in northern Syria, administratively part of the Hama Governorate, located 75 kilometers northwest of Hama. It is situated in the Ghab Plain, on the eastern bank of the Orontes River. Nearby localities include Qarqur 7 kilometers to the north, Sirmaniyah to the northwest, Qastun to the east and Farikah, Khirbet al-Arus and al-Amqiyah Tahta to the south. According to the Syria Central Bureau of Statistics, al-Ziyarah had a population of 3,541 in the 2004 census. It is also the center of the Al-Ziyarah Nahiyah ("subdistrict"), part of the Al-Suqaylabiyah District, consisting of 25 localities with a combined population of 38,872 in 2004.

== History ==
Al-Ziyarah has been identified as the ancient Aramaean city of "Ziara", which was part of the Hamath kingdom.

The name al-Ziyarah is Arabic for "visiting place." Al-Ziyarah receives its name from a double-domed shrine located in the town. The dome is white and surrounded by oak trees. It has a view over the surrounding plain and the Nusayriyah Mountain range.

Prior to 1960 the nahiyah of al-Ziyarah was part of the Idlib Governorate, after which it became a part of the Hama Governorate. In 1970 the average household in al-Ziyarah consisted of nearly nine members. An irrigation project for 17,400 hectares in the al-Ziyarah area was started in 1990. The project was completed with the construction of the Zeyzoun Dam in 1995. On 4 June 2002 the dam collapsed causing mass flooding in the area. Five towns, including al-Ziyarah, saw hundreds of homes either destroyed or severely damaged, prompting the Syrian government to request urgent international aid. Out of a total of ten people killed, five, including two women, two children and an employee of the dam, were residents of al-Ziyarah.

On 5 November 2012, during the ongoing Syrian Civil War between the Syrian government and opposition rebels, a car bomb exploded outside a government-run development agency in al-Ziyarah. While state media claimed two people were killed and 10 injured, opposition activists claimed the attack left 50 Syrian soldiers and pro-government militiamen dead.

== Bibliography ==
- Weulersse, Jacques (1946). Paysans de Syrie et du Proche-Orient. Gallimard.
- Lipinsky, Edward (2000). The Aramaeans: Their Ancient History, Culture, Religion. Peeters Publishers. ISBN 9042908599.
- al-Dbiyat, Mohamed (1995). Homs et Hama en Syrie centrale: concurrence urbaine et développement régional. Institut français de Damas.
