= Al-Tuwayni =

Al-Tuwayni التوينة
- Village
- Location in Syria
- Coordinates: 35°25′15″N 36°21′53″E
- Country: Syria
- Governorate: Hama
- District: Suqaylabiyag
- Subdistrict: Qalaat al-Madiq

Population (2004)
  - Total: 2,304
- Time zone: UTC+3 (AST)
- City Qrya Pcode: C3188

Al-Tuwayni (Arabic: التوينة, also spelled Tweini) is a village in northern Syria, located in the Qalaat al-Madiq Subdistrict of the Suqaylabiyah District in Hama Governorate. According to the Syria Central Bureau of Statistics (CBS), al-Tuwayni had a population of 2,304 in the 2004 census. Its inhabitants are predominantly Sunni Muslims.

== Economy ==
The villages economy is predominantly agricultural, with residents growing cotton, sugar beets and various vegetable crops. They also maintain herds of buffalo, cattle and sheep.
