= Al-Qahira, Syria =

Al-Qahira الصفا Al-Safa
- Village
- Location in Syria
- Coordinates: 35°36′52″N 36°21′44″E
- Country: Syria
- Governorate: Hama
- District: Suqaylabiyah
- Subdistrict: Ziyarah

Population (2004)
  - Total: 2,947
- Time zone: UTC+3 (AST)
- City Qrya Pcode: N/A

Al-Qahira (Arabic: الصفا, also known as al-Safa) is a village in northern Syria located in the Ziyarah Subdistrict of the al-Suqaylabiyah District in Hama Governorate. According to the Syria Central Bureau of Statistics (CBS), al-Qahira had a population of 2,947 in the 2004 census. Its inhabitants are predominantly Alawites, including members of the Murshidiyyun sect.
