= Tal Wassit =

Tal Wassit تل واسط
- Village
- Location in Syria
- Coordinates: 35.665045°N 36.342709°E
- Country: Syria
- Governorate: Hama
- District: Al-Suqaylabiyah District
- Subdistrict: Al-Ziyarah Nahiyah

Population (2004)
  - Total: 1,254
- Time zone: UTC+3 (AST)
- City Qrya Pcode: C3157

Tal Wassit (Arabic: تل واسط), also spelt Tal Wasat and Tall Waset, is a Syrian village located in Al-Ziyarah Nahiyah in Al-Suqaylabiyah District, Hama. According to the Syria Central Bureau of Statistics (CBS), it had a population of 1254 in the 2004 census.
