= Al-Qahirah, Hama =

Al-Qahirah, Hama القاهرة
- Village
- Location in Syria
- Coordinates: 35.609248°N 36.365476°E
- Country: Syria
- Governorate: Hama
- District: Al-Suqaylabiyah District
- Subdistrict: Qalaat al-Madiq

Population (2004)
  - Total: 708
- Time zone: UTC+3 (AST)
- City Qrya Pcode: C3203

Al-Qahirah, Hama (Arabic: القاهرة al-qāhirah) is a Syrian village located in Qalaat al-Madiq Subdistrict in Al-Suqaylabiyah District, Hama. According to the Syria Central Bureau of Statistics (CBS), the village had a population of 708 in the 2004 census.

As of 25 April 2025, the village had a population of 1,184.
