= Tamana (NGO) =

Non-profit voluntary organization

- Founded: March 1984
- Founders: Shayama Chona
- Type: Special School
- Purpose: Disability; Special Education; Research
- Location: New Delhi, India
- Region served: India
- Key people: Shayama Chona; Tamana Chona
- Website: tamana.ngo

Tamana is a non-profit voluntary organization, registered in 1984 in India, consisting of three special education centers, a training cell and a research center to support individuals with intellectual and developmental disabilities. The organization's work is recognized by the Ministry of Social Justice and Empowerment, Government of India, Government of Delhi, Rehabilitation Council of India and is registered with the National Trust. Tamana also has a Special Consultative Status within the United Nations Economic and Social Council since 2005.

The organization’s founder, Dr. Shayama Chona, was awarded the Padma Shri, a Padma Bhushan and two national awards for her contributions in the disability sector in India.

== Special Schools ==
=== Tamana Special School ===
The first branch of Tamana, the Tamana Special School, was inaugurated by the late Lady Diana, the Princess of Wales, on 12 February 1992, and the foundation stone was laid by the High Commissioner of Britain, Sir David Goodall. The Special School serves 115 children ranging in age from 4 to 17. Admission is based on the use of the regular school curricula as reference points.

=== Nai Disha Vocational Center ===
Nai Disha Vocational Center serves young adults and helps teach skills related to occupations and employment, as well as self-reliance in the real world. The program is designed to facilitate a smooth transition for students of the school to the outside world, for both the young adult and the family. It also aims to secure training for and placement of young adults in various vocations and organizations.

Major skills targeted include:

- Textiles printing
- Office skills
- Paper bag and envelope making
- Paper recycling
- Clay modeling
- Cooking and baking
- File making
- Candle making
- Computer skills
- Stationery production
- Gardening
- Beauty culture
- Tailoring

=== Tamana School of Hope ===
Tamana was the first institution in India to recognize autism as a distinct disability and to create programs specifically for autistic spectrum disorders, which were first established in 1985. The School of Hope includes a special school, a sensory integration clinic, an early intervention center, a diagnostic center, a research cell, and an outreach cell. It was inaugurated on 19 August 2003 by former president of India Dr. A.P.J. Abdul Kalam.

The school's programs include:

- A life-centered approach to curriculum planning
- Intervention approaches for autistic students based on TEACCH and ABA
- Sensory integration therapy
- Music and dance therapy
- Yoga and sports
- The students are taught to make beds, arrange clothes in cupboards, personal grooming, washing clothes, cooking
- Vocational training for youth above 16 years of age, including jewelry design, greeting card making and gardening

== Teacher Training Cell ==
Tamana has been recognized as a special study center by the Rehabilitation Council of India and IGNOU since 1994. The courses offered are:

- Post Graduate Professional Diploma in Special Education
- Post Graduate Professional certificate in Special Education
- B.Ed. in Special Education
- D.Ed. SE Diploma in Education Special Education (ASD - Autism Spectrum Disorders)

== Research ==
Tamana, in collaboration with Deakin University, Australia, launched TOBY (Therapy Outcomes by You) Playpad Laboratory on 5 July 2013 at its Autism Center, School of Hope. TOBY is an iPad-based, therapist-and-parent application for early intervention therapy with children with autism.

In association with Deakin University, Australia for TOBY, Tamana won the Victorian International Education Award for Excellence in International Education – Research Engagement in 2013.

== Fundraising ==
Tamana organizes annual fashion shows as part of its fundraising. Fashion designers that have participated in the show include Manish Arora, Rajesh Pratap Singh, Ritu Kumar, Suneet Varma, Mira and Muzzaffar Ali, J.J. Vallaya, Satya Paul, Abhishek Gupta and Nandita Basu, Namrata Joshipura, Rohit Gandhi and Rahul Khanna. Students from the Tamana Special Schools walk the ramp together with professional models. The objective of the event is to create and ensure public awareness, understanding and acceptance of people with special needs.

Tamana organizes an annual winter carnival for showcasing marketing the products developed by the students. The aim of the event is to create awareness about the disabled and to promote their social integration.

== Honours, awards and recognition ==
- Tamana was given the National Award for Best Institution for Child Welfare by Department of Women and Child Development, Government of India.
- The first Mother Teresa Award (Nov. 1997) was presented to Tamana Special School for its dedicated services to the mentally impaired.
- Dr. Shyama Chona, President of Tamana, received the National Award for the Welfare Of People With Disabilities for the year 1997. It was an appreciation of years of struggle in the field of disability at a personal and institutional level for her.
- NGO in Special Consultative Status with United Nations' Economic and Social Council, 2005.
- Award for the Most Innovative Project Implementation in 2007 presented at the round table organised on Global Partnerships in Poverty Eradication and Health Care, organised as part of annual ministerial review innovation fair (Asia) - an initiative of NGO DESA
