= Al-Ramlah, Syria =

Ramleh, Hama الرملة
- Village
- Country: Syria
- Governorate: Hama
- District: Al-Suqaylabiyah District
- Subdistrict: Qalaat al-Madiq

Population (2004)
  - Total: 2,359
- Time zone: UTC+3 (AST)
- City Qrya Pcode: N/A

Ramleh, Hama (Arabic: الرملة) is a Syrian village located in Qalaat al-Madiq Subdistrict in Al-Suqaylabiyah District, Hama. According to the Syria Central Bureau of Statistics (CBS), Ramleh, Hama had a population of 2,359 in the 2004 census.
