= Shathah =

Shathah شطحة
- Town
- Shathah al-Tahta شطحة التحتا
- Location in Syria
- Coordinates: 35.503°N 36.244°E
- Country: Syria
- Governorate: Hama
- District: Al-Suqaylabiyah
- Subdistrict: Shathah

Population (2004)
  - Total: 8,076
- Time zone: UTC+3 (AST)

Shathah (Arabic: شطحة التحتا, šaṭḥat at-taḥta) is a town in northwestern Syria, administratively part of the Hama Governorate, located northwest of Hama. Nearby localities include Slinfah to the northwest, Nabl al-Khatib and Farikah to the north, al-Huwash to the northeast, Huwayjat al-Sallah to the southeast, Inab to the south and Ayn al-Tineh to the west.

According to the Syria Central Bureau of Statistics (CBS), Shathah had a population of 8,076 in the 2004 census. It is the administrative center and largest town of Shathah Subdistrict, which consisted of 12 localities with a collective population of 25,273 in 2004. Its inhabitants are predominantly Alawites.
