= Breij, Syria =

Breij بريج
- Village
- Location in Syria
- Coordinates: 35°23′13″N 36°27′40″E
- Country: Syria
- Governorate: Hama
- District: Al-Suqaylabiyah District
- Subdistrict: Al-Suqaylabiyah Nahiyah

Population (2004)
  - Total: 2,153
- Time zone: UTC+3 (AST)
- City Qrya Pcode: C3121

Breij (Arabic: بريج) is a Syrian village located in Al-Suqaylabiyah Nahiyah in Al-Suqaylabiyah District, Hama. According to the Syria Central Bureau of Statistics (CBS), Breij had a population of 2,153 in the 2004 census.
