= Mansura, Hama =

Mansura, Hama المنصورة
- Village
- Location in Syria
- Coordinates: 35.650618°N 36.348438°E
- Country: Syria
- Governorate: Hama
- District: Al-Suqaylabiyah District
- Subdistrict: Al-Ziyarah Nahiyah

Population (2004)
  - Total: 770
- Time zone: UTC+3 (AST)
- City Qrya Pcode: C3160

Mansura (Arabic: المنصورة, romanized: al-Manṣūrah), also spelt Mansoura, is a Syrian village located in Al-Ziyarah Nahiyah in Al-Suqaylabiyah District, Hama. According to the Syria Central Bureau of Statistics (CBS), it had a population of 770 in the 2004 census.

== Syrian Civil War ==
During the Syrian Civil War Mansura came under the control of Hayat Tahrir al-Sham. The Syrian Arab Army began shelling the village on August 28, 2018 in preparation for their operation against the last remaining areas under rebel control.
