= Jaysh al-Nasr =

Syrian Rebel Group

Army of Victory
- جيش النصر; Jaysh al-Nasr
- Official logo of Jaysh al-Nasr
- Leaders: Major Muhammad Mansour (commander-in-chief); Major Engineer Hassan Sheikh Yusuf (deputy commander-in-chief); Major Zuhair Sheikh (chief of staff); Dr. Hassan Hamidi (chief of political bureau); Captain Mohannad Junaid; Captain Tariq Jadou (executed); First Lieutenant Alaa Rakhmon †
- Dates active: August 2015 – January 2025
- Groups: Falcons of al-Ghab; Free Daraya Brigade; Owais al-Qarani Battalion; Mutasim Billah Battalion; Shuhada Tarmala Battalion; Farouq Army (remnants of the Farouq Brigades in northern Hama); Harakat al-Fedayeen; Northern branch; Left in February 2018: 111th Regiment; Salvation Front
- Headquarters: Qalaat al-Madiq (until May 2019)
- Active regions: Northwestern Syria: Hama Governorate; Idlib Governorate; Aleppo Governorate; Latakia Governorate
- Ideology: Islamism; Syrian nationalism
- Size: 5,000 (2015 estimate); 4,000 (2018 estimate)
- Part of: (Syrian opposition) Free Syrian Army: (Syrian opposition) Syrian National Army; National Front for Liberation (since May 2018); Fatah Halab (2015–16); North Hama Countryside Operations Room
- Wars: the Syrian Civil War
- Website: https://twitter.com/alnasararmy

The Army of Victory (Arabic: جيش النصر; Jaysh al-Nasr) was an armed opposition faction participating in the Syrian Civil War. Founded in August 2015 as a joint operations room of 16 member groups, three of the groups later fully merged into Jaysh al-Nasr. The group was supplied with US-made BGM-71 TOW anti-tank missiles.

At the Syrian Revolution Victory Conference, which was held on 29 January 2025, most factions of the armed opposition, including Jaysh al-Nasr, announced their dissolution and were incorporated into the newly formed Ministry of Defense.

== History ==
=== Formation as a joint operations room ===
Jaysh al-Nasr was formed in early August 2015 as a joint operations room with the stated objective being the "liberation of the northern countryside of Hama, breaking the regime's first defense line toward the city of Hama." It was announced as a first step towards unifying the Free Syrian Army in Idlib and Hama provinces into a single operations room. The alliance initially comprised the following 16 groups:

- Falcons of al-Ghab
- Gathering of Glory
- Falcons of Mount Zawiya Brigade
- Salvation Front
- Levant Brigade
- 6th Brigade
- 111th Brigade
- 60th Brigade
- Bilad ash-Sham Brigade
- 111th Regiment
- Revolutionary Fedayeen Movement (former member of the Army of Revolutionaries)
- Hawks of Jihad Battalion
- Martyrs of Tremseh Brigade
- Al-Mashhour Battalions
- Antiquities Brigade

=== Reformation as a unified group ===
In late October 2015, it was announced that three of its component groups, the Falcons of al-Ghab, 111th Regiment, and the Salvation Front, completely merged into Jaysh al-Nasr with Suqour al-Ghab's commander, Major Muhammad Mansour, assuming the leadership of the new unified group. In late September 2016, the group previously known as Liwa Ahrar Darayya (who had been evacuated from Darayya due to a deal made with the Syrian government) announced their merge into Jaysh al-Nasr.

Jaysh al-Nasr have taken mainly Alawite civilians, including children, as prisoners. 112 of them were released from Qalaat al-Madiq on 7 February 2017 as part of a prisoner exchange.

=== Rebel infighting ===
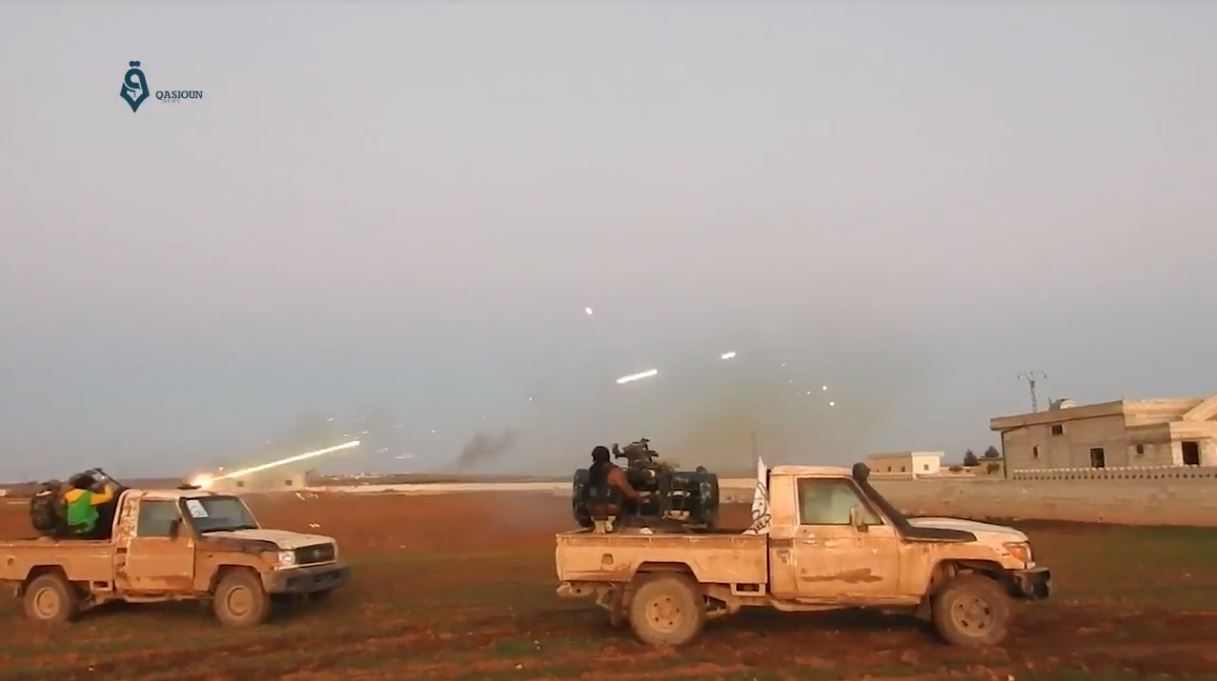
Jaysh al-Nasr technicals in the southern Idlib countryside during the northwestern Syria campaign, 23 January 2018.

On 7 February 2017, Jund al-Aqsa attacked the headquarters of Jaysh al-Nasr near the town of Murak in northern Hama. Jund al-Aqsa captured more than 250 fighters from Jaysh al-Nasr. On 14 February, they reportedly killed at least 80 Jaysh al-Nasr prisoners before withdrawing from their positions north of Khan Shaykhun. Kafr Nuboudah and Kafr Zita villages were the origin of the Jaysh Nasr members whom Liwa al-Aqsa executed according to Moussa al-Omar. The casualties given for Jaysh Nasr were 56 fighters, 3 media reporters, and 11 military commanders, according to Moussa al-Omar. After Jund al-Aqsa committed slaughter at Khan Shaykhun, only one person lived to tell the tale.

After the infighting with Jund al-Aqsa, Captain Muhannad Junaid of Jaysh al-Nasr stated that "The whole of Idlib will be painted black".

On 22 May 2017, first lieutenant Alaa Rakhmon of Jaysh al-Nasr was assassinated by unknown assailants in the village of Kafr Nabudah. Rakhmon was a prominent operator of BGM-71 TOW missiles and was responsible for destroying several Syrian Army tanks during the 2017 Hama offensive.

=== Turkish support ===
Western financial support for Jaysh al-Nasr largely ended in October 2017. On 9 February 2018, the 111th Regiment and the Salvation Front left Jaysh al-Nasr. The Falcons of al-Ghab, led by Major Muhammad Mansour, became the only significant faction left in the group. Turkey continues to provide financial and military support for Jaysh al-Nasr and other rebel groups in the region. In exchange for continued support, Turkey requested these rebel groups to participate in the Turkish military operation in Afrin, which Jaysh al-Nasr did beginning on 16 February, with its northern branch having already been taking part through its position in the new Turkish-sponsored Syrian National Army. On the same day, Jaysh al-Nasr appointed 3 new leaders.

In May 2018, along with 10 other rebel groups in northwestern Syria, the Army of Victory formed the National Front for Liberation, which was officially announced on 28 May. Maj. Muhammad Mansour, commander of Jaysh al-Nasr, was appointed chief of staff of the formation.

After it left the Army of Victory, the 111th Regiment joined the Sham Legion's northern Hama branch, which was also part of the NFL. On 6 January 2019, the Sham Legion expelled the 111th Regiment for insubordination.

== See also ==
- List of armed groups in the Syrian Civil War
