= Maarkaba =

Maarkaba معركبة
- Village
- Location in Syria
- Coordinates: 35°19′1″N 36°40′5″E
- Country: Syria
- Governorate: Hama
- District: Hama
- Subdistrict: Suran

Population (2004)
  - Total: 494
- Time zone: UTC+3 (AST)
- City Qrya Pcode: C3030

Ma'arkaba (Arabic: معركبة) is a Syrian village located in the Suran Subdistrict in Hama District. According to the Syria Central Bureau of Statistics (CBS), Ma'arkaba had a population of 494 in the 2004 census.
