= Sirmaniyah =

Sirmaniyah سرمانية Sarmania
- Village
- Location in Syria
- Coordinates: 35°43′23″N 36°16′38″E
- Country: Syria
- Governorate: Hama
- District: Al-Suqaylabiyah
- Subdistrict: Al-Ziyarah

Population (2004)
  - Total: 2,087
- Time zone: UTC+3 (AST)

Sirmaniyah (Arabic: سرمانية Sirmāniyah, also spelled Sarmania, al-Sarmaniyah, Sermaniye) is a village in northern Syria, administratively part of the Hama Governorate, northwest of Hama. Nearby localities include Jisr al-Shughur 12 kilometers to the north, Qarqur to the northeast, al-Ziyarah to the southeast and Farikah to the south. According to the Syria Central Bureau of Statistics (CBS), Sirmaniyah had a population of 2,087 in the 2004 census. Its inhabitants are predominantly Sunni Muslims.

== History ==
Sirmaniyah has been identified as the village of "Sarum" where John Maron, the first Maronite patriarch was born. However, the Syrian village of Sarmin to the north has also been identified as "Sarum."

In the 12th century Sirmaniyah served as a Crusader fortress and fief known as "Sarmania", part of the Principality of Antioch. Its name derived from the Sarmani family who controlled the castle. The Sarmani were a Germanic family, many of whose members occupied high-ranking offices within the Principality, including Gervais of Sarmania. The fortress was captured by Saladin, the Muslim sultan of the Ayyubid dynasty, on 19 August 1188 after a brief siege.

Sirmaniyah has seen violence during the ongoing Syrian civil war between the government and opposition forces. According to opposition activists, the village was assaulted by Syrian Army tanks on 10 June 2011, early in the uprising. Fleeing residents of Sirmaniyah were reportedly pursued by Syrian troops. Activists stated that the Syrian Army entered with hundreds of soldiers and "cleaned out three villages," including Sirmaniyah. At least one person was reportedly killed in the village. On 23 April 2015, heavy clashes were reported in the village as part of a rebel campaign to capture Jisr al-Shughur. On 14 October, the Syrian Army took over the village. Eventually, the village was captured by the Jihadist Tahrir al-Sham, who rule over much of Idlib governorate.

On 15 April 2022, a militant of Ansar al-Islam blew himself up in a suicide attack aimed at destroying Syrian army positions near the village. One Syrian soldier was killed and 4 others were wounded in the attack.

== Bibliography ==
- Boulanger, Robert (1966). The Middle East, Lebanon, Syria, Jordan, Iraq, Iran. Hachette.
- Moosa, Matti (1986). The Maronites in History. Syracuse University Press. ISBN 0815623658.
- Stevenson, William Barron (1907). The Crusaders in the East: A Brief History of the Wars of Islam with the Latins in Syria During the Twelfth and Thirteenth Centuries. Cambridge University Press. "Sarmaniya Syria."
