= Falcons of al-Ghab =

Syrian rebel group

Union of Falcons of al-Ghab
- مجموعة صقور الغاب; Majmou'at Suqour al-Ghab
- Leaders: Lieutenant Colonel Jamil Radoun †; Major Muhammad Mansour
- Dates active: February 2012—24 October 2015 (dissolved)
- Headquarters: Qalaat al-Madiq
- Active regions: Hama Governorate; Idlib Governorate
- Size: 2,000
- Part of: Free Syrian Army: Hama Military Council; Fatah Halab
- Wars: the Syrian civil war
- Website: https://twitter.com/skoralghab

The Union of Falcons of al-Ghab (مجموعة صقور الغاب; Majmou'at Suqour al-Ghab) was a Syrian rebel group affiliated with the Free Syrian Army that was formed in the early stage of the Syrian Civil War in February 2012. It was initially part of the Hama Military Council and mainly operated in the al-Ghab Plain in the western Hama Governorate. The group received BGM-71 TOW anti-tank missiles as it was part of the Supreme Military Council. The group played an important role in the capture of the al-Ghab region and was also involved in the 2014 Hama offensive in northern Hama. us. A stop On 3 August 2015 the group along with 14 other FSA factions in northern Hama formed Jaysh al-Nasr, or the Army of Victory operations room, in order to support offensives led by the Army of Conquest. In the same month the group's commander, Lieutenant Colonel Jamil Radoun, was assassinated by a car bomb in Antakya, Turkey. The group reportedly had an "antagonistic relationship" with al-Qaeda's al-Nusra Front before Radoun's assassination.

On 24 October, the Falcons of al-Ghab was fully integrated into the Army of Victory, turning it from an operations room to a united group.

== History ==
The group played an important role in the capture of the al-Ghab region and was also involved in the 2014 Hama offensive in northern Hama.

On 3 August 2015, the group along with 14 other FSA rebel factions in northern Hama formed Jaysh al-Nasr, or the Army of Victory operations room, in order to support offensives led by the Army of Conquest. In the same month the group's commander, Lieutenant Colonel Jamil Radoun, was assassinated by a car bomb in Reyhanlı, Turkey. The group reportedly had an "antagonistic relationship" with al-Qaeda's al-Nusra Front before Radoun's assassination.

On 24 October, the Falcons of al-Ghab was fully integrated into the Army of Victory, turning it from an operations room to a united group.

== See also ==
- List of armed groups in the Syrian Civil War
