= Zayzun, Hama =

Zayzun زيزون
- Village
- Location in Syria
- Coordinates: 35°43′37″N 36°21′25″E
- Country: Syria
- Governorate: Hama
- District: Al-Suqaylabiyah District
- Subdistrict: Al-Ziyarah Nahiyah

Population (2004)
  - Total: 1,944
- Time zone: UTC+3 (AST)
- City Qrya Pcode: C3161

Zayzun (Arabic: زيزون) is a Syrian village located in Al-Ziyarah Nahiyah in Al-Suqaylabiyah District, Hama. According to the Syria Central Bureau of Statistics (CBS), Zayzun had a population of 1944 in the 2004 census.

== See also ==
- Zeyzoun Dam
