= Al-Ankawi =

Al-Ankawi العنكاوي
- Town
- Location in Syria
- Coordinates: 35°35′51″N 36°23′22″E
- Country: Syria
- Governorate: Hama
- District: Suqaylabiyah
- Subdistrict: Ziyarah

Population (2004)
  - Total: 2,298
- Time zone: UTC+3 (AST)
- City Qrya Pcode: C3155

Al-Ankawi (Arabic: العنكاوي) is a Syrian town located in the Ziyarah Subdistrict of the al-Suqaylabiyah District in Hama Governorate. According to the Syria Central Bureau of Statistics (CBS), al-Ankawi had a population of 2,298 in the 2004 census. Its inhabitants are predominantly Sunni Muslims.

The settlement has been shelled repeatedly by the Syrian government in recent years.
