= Zeyzoun Dam =

- Location within Syria
- Country: Syria
- Location: Zeyzoun
- Coordinates: 35°43′03″N 36°21′48″E
- Status: Failed
- Opening date: 1996
- Demolition date: 4 June 2002

Dam and spillways
- Type of dam: Embankment
- Height: 32 m (105 ft)

Reservoir
- Total capacity: 71,000,000 m^{3} (57,561 acre⋅ft)

The Zeyzoun Dam is a failed embankment dam near Zayzun, Hama Governorate, Syria. It impounded water pumped from the nearby Orontes River, which has been used for irrigation of the surrounding countryside for centuries. The dam was completed in 1996 and its primary purpose was the irrigation of about 14,000 ha (35,000 acres). The dam's reservoir was filled in the winter and expended its water during the summer.

The dam failed on 4 June 2002, causing widespread damage, killing 27 people, displacing 2,000 and directly affecting over 10,000. Hours before the dam failed, in the afternoon, cracks were noticed in the embankment. People were evacuated as water began to pour through the cracks. The water eventually breached an 80 m (262 ft) wide hole in the dam which released a 3.3 m (11 ft) high wave of water. The water engulfed 80 km^{2} (31 mi^{2}), destroying 251 homes and damaging hundreds of others. Several international organizations, non-government organizations and nations sent aid. Reportedly, Syrian officials had ignored warnings that the dam was in need of serious repair.

== See also ==
- Dam failure
