= Al-Hawash, Hama =

Al-Hawash الحواش
- Village
- Location in Syria
- Coordinates: 35°33′4″N 36°22′41″E
- Country: Syria
- Governorate: Hama
- District: Suqaylabiyah
- Subdistrict: Qalaat al-Madiq

Population (2004)
  - Total: 3,306
- Time zone: UTC+3 (AST)
- City Qrya Pcode: C3195

Al-Hawash (Arabic: الحواش) is a Syrian village located in the Qalaat al-Madiq Subdistrict of the al-Suqaylabiyah District in Hama Governorate. According to the Syria Central Bureau of Statistics (CBS), al-Hawash had a population of 3,306 in the 2004 census. As of September 2018, the population is estimated to be between 8,400 and 8,600, of whom between 450 and 500 are IDPS.
