= Shathah Subdistrict =

Shathah Subdistrict ناحية شطحة
- Subdistrict (nahiyah)
- Location in Hama Governorate

- Location in Syria
- Country: Syria
- Governorate: Hama
- District: Al-Suqaylabiyah District
- Capital: Shathah

Population (2004)
  - Total: 25,273
- Time zone: UTC+2 (EET)
  - Summer (DST): UTC+3 (EEST)
- Nahya pcod: SY050203

Shathah Subdistrict (Arabic: ناحية شطحة) is a Syrian nahiyah (subdistrict) located in Al-Suqaylabiyah District in Hama. According to the Syria Central Bureau of Statistics (CBS), Shathah Subdistrict had a population of 25,273 in the 2004 census.
