= Al-Ziyarah Subdistrict =

Al-Ziyarah Subdistrict ناحية الزيارة
- Subdistrict (nahiyah)
- Location in Hama Governorate

- Location in Syria
- Coordinates: 35.68°N 36.3292°E
- Country: Syria
- Governorate: Hama
- District: Al-Suqaylabiyah District
- Capital: Al-Ziyarah

Population (2004)
  - Total: 38,872
- Time zone: UTC+2 (EET)
  - Summer (DST): UTC+3 (EEST)
- Nahya pcod: SY050202

Al-Ziyarah Subdistrict (Arabic: ناحية الزيارة) is a Syrian nahiyah (subdistrict) located in Al-Suqaylabiyah District in Hama. According to the Syria Central Bureau of Statistics (CBS), al-Ziyarah Subdistrict had a population of 38,872 in the 2004 census. By July 2023, the subdistrict's population had declined to 4,699 as a consequence of the Syrian Civil War. The subdistrict is named after the town of al-Ziyarah, and its biggest town is Qastun.
