= Forum =

Forum or The Forum may refer to:

== Common uses ==
- Forum (legal), designated space for public expression in the United States
- Forum (Roman), open public space within a Roman city
  - Roman Forum, most famous example
- Internet forum, discussion board on the Internet

== Arts and entertainment ==
- Forum & Forum Expanded, a section of the Berlin International Film Festival
- Forum (album), a 2001 pop/soft rock album by Invertigo
- The Forum (vocal group), organized by American musician Les Baxter
- Forum theatre, a type of theatrical technique created by Brazilian theatre director Augusto Boal
- Forum Theatre (Washington, D.C.), a former theatre group
- Forum, a typeface designed by Frederic Goudy in 1911

== Buildings ==
=== Shopping centres ===
- Forum (shopping centre), Helsinki, Finland
- The Forum (shopping mall), Bangalore, India
- Forum Mall (Kolkata), Kolkata, India
- Forum The Shopping Mall, Singapore
- The Forum on Peachtree Parkway, Peachtree Corners, Georgia, United States
- The Forum Shops at Caesars, Las Vegas, Nevada, United States

=== Sports and entertainment venues ===
==== United Kingdom ====
- The Forum, Barrow-in-Furness, Cumbria, England
- The Forum, Bath, an event venue and church in Bath, Somerset, England
- The Forum, Tunbridge Wells, a live music venue in Royal Tunbridge Wells, Kent, England
- O2 Forum Kentish Town, formerly London Forum, a nightclub and live music venue in Kentish Town, London

==== United States ====
- Broome County Forum Theatre, a theater in Binghamton, New York commonly called The Forum
- FedExForum, an arena in Memphis, Tennessee
- The Forum (Chicago), an event venue in Chicago, Illinois
- The Forum, Los Angeles, former name of Kia Forum, an indoor arena in Inglewood, California
- Tampa Bay Times Forum, former name of Benchmark International Arena, a multi-purpose arena in Tampa Bay, Florida

==== Other countries ====
- The Forum, North Adelaide, former name of the Piccadilly Cinema, a cinema in Adelaide, South Australia
- The Forum, Toronto, former venue on the site of the Molson Canadian Amphitheatre
- Forum Copenhagen, exhibition, concert, and faire building in Copenhagen, Denmark
- Forum Groningen, a cultural centre, library and cinema in Groningen, the Netherlands
- Forum Theatre (officially Forum Melbourne), a live music venue in Melbourne, Australia
- Mediolanum Forum, an indoor arena in Milan, Italy
- Montreal Forum, a historic arena in Montreal, Quebec, Canada
- Halifax Forum, an arena in Halifax, Nova Scotia, Canada

=== Other buildings ===
- Forum Restaurant, Sino Plaza, Causeway Bay, Hong Kong
- Forum Station, a metro station in Copenhagen
- Informatics Forum, on the campus of the University of Edinburgh
- The Forum, Hemel Hempstead, municipal building in Hemel Hempstead
- The Forum, Norwich, a library, tourist information office and headquarters of the BBC in Norwich
- The Forum at 343 East 74th Street, a residential building in New York City
- The Forum Southend-on-Sea, a library in Essex, England
- The Forum, Gloucester, a development in Gloucester, England

== Businesses and organizations ==
- Forum (alternative dispute resolution), formerly known as the National Arbitration Forum
- Berkeley Forum, a student organization at the University of California, Berkeley
- Forum Group, an Australian company
- The Forum, a group involved in the origins of The Urantia Book
- The Forum, a brand of self-help firm Landmark Worldwide

== Media ==
=== Periodicals ===
- Forum (Bangladesh), Bangladeshi current affairs magazine
- The Forum (alumni magazine), the Columbia University alumni magazine
- Forum (business magazine), Swedish-language magazine in Finland
- Forum (Macedonian magazine), weekly political magazine in the Republic of Macedonia
- Forum (Turkey), biweekly political magazine in Turkey published between 1954 and 1970
- Penthouse Forum, American pornographic magazine
- The Forum (American magazine), published between 1886 and 1950
- The Forum, official magazine of Alcoholics Anonymous
- The Forum of Fargo-Moorhead, newspaper in Fargo, North Dakota
- The Forum, online publication of the African American Policy Forum
- FORUM: Issues about Part-Time and Contingent Faculty, publication of the National Council of Teachers of English
- FORVM, Austrian cultural magazine (1954–1995), NEUES FORVM (1966–1979)

=== Radio ===
- Forum (KQED), a radio show on KQED-FM hosted by Michael Krasny
- The Forum (BBC World Service), an international radio discussion show

== Places ==
- Forum, Arkansas, United States, an unincorporated community
- Forum Peak, on the border of Alberta and British Columbia, Canada

== See also ==
- Foorum, Tallinn, Estonia
- Foraminifera, a phylum or class of amoeboid protists
- FORA (disambiguation)
