= FORA =

FORA or Fora may refer to:

== Groups and organizations ==
- Argentine Regional Workers' Federation (Spanish: Federación Obrera Regional Argentina)
- Fora (Ukrainian: Фора), Ukrainian national retailer and supermarket
- Fora.ie, an Irish online newspaper
- Fora.tv, an American production company
- Fort Ord Reuse Authority, Fort Ord, Monterrey Bay, California, United States
- Fora River – Rivers of Portugal a river in Portugal

== Places ==
- Fora Islet, Savage Islands, Madeira, Portugal; an Atlantic island
- Piz Fora (Italian: Fora Peak), Bernina Range, Alps; a mountain on the Italy-Switzerland border
- Föra Church, Öland, Sweden; in the Baltic
- Fora, Hama, Syria

== Other uses ==
- Michael Fora (born 1995), Swiss ice hockey player
- Chery Fora, a car
- Fargo Fora, a light commercial van

== See also ==
- Gherardo di Giovanni del Fora (1445–1497), Italian painter
- Cepora fora (C. fora), a butterfly
- Juiz de Fora – city and municipality in the state of Minas Gerais, Brazil
- São Vicente de Fora – locality and former civil parish in Portugal
- Foras (disambiguation)
- Forum (disambiguation), for the singular of 'fora'
- Fiora (disambiguation)
- Flora (disambiguation)
