= FIRA =

FIRA may refer to:

== Persons ==
- Fira Basuki (born 1972), Indonesian novelist

== Places ==
- Fira, the modern capital of the Greek Aegean island, Santorini
- Fira de Barcelona, the Barcelona (Spain) Trade Show institution
- Fira station of the Barcelona Metro

== Science ==
- FiRa Consortium, the Fine Ranging Consortium is an industry consortium working to further interoperable Ultra-Wideband (UWB) technology.
- Fira OS, a Linux-based mobile operating system and software platform developed by Fira

== Abbreviations ==
- Federation of Indian Rationalist Associations, an umbrella body of rationalist, atheist, skeptic, secularist and science organizations in India
- Federation of International Robot-soccer Association, an international organization which organizes competitive soccer competitions between autonomous robots
- Foreign Investment Review Agency, a Canadian organization
- Furniture Industry Research Association, a United Kingdom research association which serves the furniture industry
- FIRA – Association of European Rugby, now Rugby Europe, the administrative body for rugby union in Europe
- UDP-3-O-(3-hydroxymyristoyl)glucosamine N-acyltransferase, an enzyme

== See also ==
- Fira Sans, a sans-serif typeface
