= Brent Leggs =

American architectural historian (born 1972)

Leggs in 2016

Demond "Brent" Leggs (born 22 November 1972) is an African-American architectural historian and preservationist from Paducah, Kentucky. Among his roles at the National Trust for Historic Preservation he has been the founding executive director of the African American Cultural Heritage Action Fund, which has raised over $150 million since 2017 for the preservation of historic Black places across the country.

He has played a role in reframing the idea of historic preservation, expanding its scope and its approach, including ways of using preservation activities to encourage and develop community resilience and sustainability. Leggs' work is guided, he says, by the idea that preservation is "about economic development" and "the empowerment of people as much as it's about the history."

== Education ==
Leggs studied marketing at the University of Kentucky as an undergraduate, and earned his MBA there. He attended the University of Kentucky's graduate program in historic preservation (part of its School of Architecture), where his graduate studies were supported by the National Trust through its Mildred Colodny diversity scholarships. He remains one of a very small number of African Americans working in his field, although he has played a role in "credentialling" others.

== Professional achievements ==
The field work component of Leggs' career began with an inventory of Rosenwald schools in Kentucky during which he learned that his own parents had been students at Rosenwald schools. This experience convinced him "of the power that physical places have in shaping cultural memory."

His early practical preservation work includes being project manager for places designated by the National Trust as National Treasures, including Joe Frazier's Gym in Philadelphia; Hinchliffe Stadium in Paterson, New Jersey; and Villa Lewaro, Madam C. J. Walker's estate in Irvington, New York.

Using his business school training Leggs has developed the Northeast African American Historic Places Outreach Program, guided by "its theme, the Business of Preservation," with the goal of setting up "a regional movement of preservation leaders" to preserve African American landmarks. Leggs has become an advocate and an advisor to "city leaders, property owners, and stakeholders" at local and national levels on how to leverage business as well as cultural advantages from the preservation of historical sites as cultural assets.

Many of these sites have been associated with the State of Alabama, especially the city of Birmingham, and the Civil Rights Movement there, as well as America's Historically Black Colleges and Universities. He has also helped preserve Nina Simone's birthplace in Tryon, North Carolina, and John and Alice Coltrane's home in Huntington, New York. The restoration of Simone's birthplace illustrates the sort of cooperation with locals Leggs advocates to find ongoing uses once an historical site has been preserved. It also illustrates his commitment particularly to the involvement of African American women in both jazz and civil rights activities.

As part of his work with the National Trust Leggs has played a large role in getting numerous African American sites recognized as historically significant. In 2024, Leggs was profiled in Bloomberg about the Action Fund's work. "“Our industry has celebrated the grand architectural mansions, but that’s not the experience that you have with a Black vernacular site. To shift our industry’s understanding of what is worthy of preservation, both intellectually and in practice, was a big moment," he said.

=== African American Cultural Heritage Action Fund ===
==== Contribution to national discussion of monuments, racism, and preservation of history ====
In the 21st century a national discussion of the role of monuments in preserving and perpetuating a racist view of the United States' history turned into sometimes violent attacks on historical monuments glorifying Confederate soldiers and politicians. In 2017 protests and counterprotests at Charlottesville, Virginia, led to the death of Heather Heyer. National outrage made this an exceptional event that remains a reference point in various aspects of US culture, including historical preservation.

Following this event, in 2018 Leggs wrote in Essence about the history of saving sites significant to African American history and the multifaceted importance of doing so. He credited the National Association of Colored Women, led by Mary B. Talbert, for "inaugurating the Black preservation movement" by preserving Frederick Douglass' home in Washington a century earlier. Pointing out that the National Trust for Historic Preservation was "chartered by Congress in 1949 to help tell the full American story," Leggs concluded that "when the past is blanched and distorted through lack of diversity and representation, it affects both our understanding of today's issues and our capacity to grow in the future."

In this context, the African American Cultural Heritage Action Fund came into existence "to move the narrative beyond confederate heritage and ensure the preservation of national treasures integral to the full African American story." Leggs sees the Fund's activities as playing a role in "reconstructing" America's national identity.

"The largest-ever campaign to preserve African-American historic sites," in its first year it "received more than eight hundred applications requesting nearly ninety-one million dollars in grants." Set up as a multi-year effort with funding from public and private sources, it does not receive federal support since "the federal government stopped allocating funds to the National Trust in 1997." Leggs has been responsible for much of the Fund's financial support, persuading both wealthy individuals and mainstream nonprofits such as the JPB Foundation, the Ford Foundation, and the Andrew W. Mellon Foundation to contribute.

==== Impacts ====
Impacts of the Fund's activities include training young people in the skills needed for preservation work and developing research on the role of preservation of historical sites for community resilience. The Fund uses these results as leverage to persuade policy makers and community leaders to recognize the value of preservation work. Understanding "the economics of historic preservation" to be both profitable as well as costly, Leggs and the Action Fund help communities wanting to save historic space find "adaptive reuses" for such spaces that often challenge traditional notions of what historical preservation is about.

"Along with elevating forgotten places," Leggs has written, the Fund aims "to reveal the hidden, and sometimes willfully obscured, layers of history at all historic sites." This has involved retroactively adding information to existing recognized historical sites that might previously have ignored significant African American history associated with them, especially where the history of slavery in the United States is concerned. The foundation for this retroactive move might be seen nearly two decades earlier, when Representative Jesse Jackson, Jr., added language to an appropriations bill "encouraging" the National Park Service, as part of its US heritage tourism activities, to "acknowledge" the role of institutionalized slavery "in all of their public displays and multimedia educational presentations."

While he may be "typically contacted to help preserve something" that may have deteriorated badly, in 2013 Leggs got involved with ongoing attempts to save Shockoe Bottom in Richmond, VA, a place where much of the archaeological remains had been destroyed. The Fund accepts as a principle that historical sites may remain important to cultural memory even in such cases, perhaps especially so in the case of African American history.

==== Funded sites ====
The appearance of the award-winning film Green Book in 2018 drew attention to The Negro Motorist Green Book. Sites listed there are part of the African American Cultural Heritage Action Fund's future plans and its current call for financial support. Awards are announced annually. In 2019 new sites receiving support included Langston Hughes' house in Harlem, NYC; The Harriet Tubman Home in Auburn, NY; Satchel Paige's home in Kansas City, Missouri; the Emmett Till and Mamie Till-Mobley National Monument; The Forum in Chicago's Bronzeville neighborhood; the African Meeting House in Boston, MA; and the Emanuel African Methodist Episcopal Church in Charleston, South Carolina.

== Academic accomplishments and honors ==
Leggs' faculty positions have included "Clinical Assistant Professor" at the University of Maryland's School of Architecture, Planning and Preservation, and adjunct status at the Boston Architectural College. He has also taught at Harvard University's Graduate School of Design as a Loeb Fellow, an honor given to those with, among other characteristics, "a passionate commitment to revitalizing communities." He has also taught at the University of Pennsylvania.

He has co-authored Preserving African American Historic Places (2012), which the Smithsonian Institution called the "seminal publication on preserving African American historic sites." It "provides tools for protecting ... important landmarks in African American history." He has also contributed to Preservation and Social Inclusion (2020). He has made numerous public appearances, including on C-Span, where he appeared four times between 2016 and 2019.

In 2018 he received the Robert G. Stanton National Preservation Award.
