= Foras (disambiguation) =

Foras or FORAS may refer to:

- Chita Foras (1900–1986), Italian-Argentine actress
- Foras, a powerful demon
- FORAS (Friends of (the) Rebel Army Society), an Irish industrial and provident society

== See also ==
- FORA (disambiguation), for the singular of Foras and FORAs
- Forum (disambiguation)
