= Hotel Metropolitan Museum =

Historic hotel in Kentucky, U.S.

- Hotel Metropolitan
- U.S. National Register of Historic Places
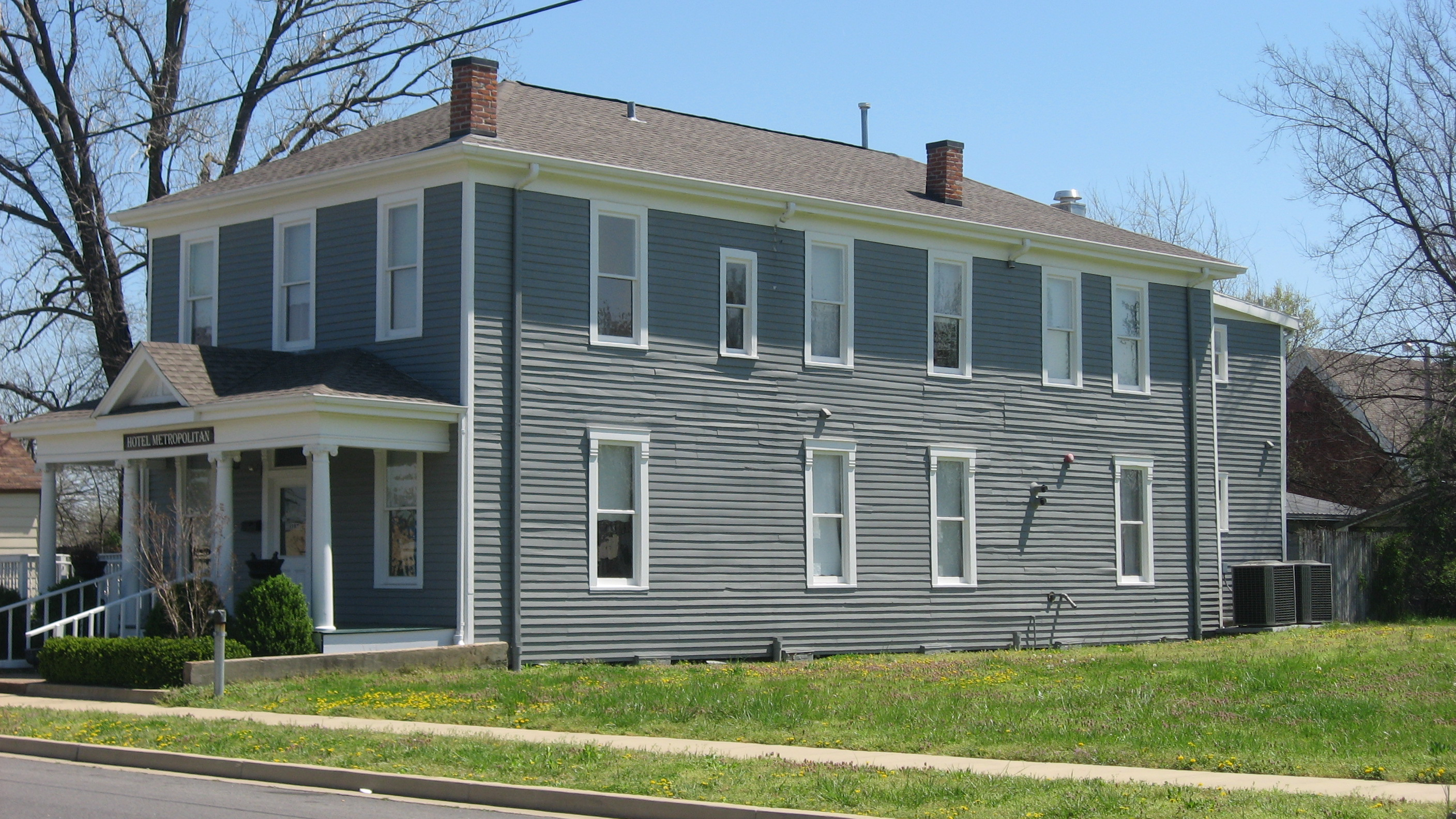

- Location within Kentucky
- Location: 724 Jackson St., Paducah, Kentucky
- Coordinates: 37°4′45.5″N 88°35′57″W
- Area: less than one acre
- Architectural style: Classical Revival
- NRHP reference No.: 01001251
- Added to NRHP: April 12, 2002

Hotel Metropolitan Museum is a museum in historic hotel building in Paducah, Kentucky, U.S. The Hotel Metropolitan was the city's first African American owned hotel and provided lodging for African Americans traveling through the area; was a stop on the Chitlin' Circuit, and was listed in The Negro Motorist Green Book. The Hotel Metropolitan Museum focuses on African American history.

== History ==
Hotel Metropolitan was built in 1908 by its owner, Maggie Steed, at 724 Jackson Street (now Oscar Cross Avenue) in the Upper Town district of Paducah. Steed built the Metropolitan to accommodate guests who were denied lodging at white-owned hotels due to discriminatory laws and practices of the Jim Crow South. Hotel guests included Louis Armstrong, Duke Ellington, Ella Fitzgerald, and Thurgood Marshall. Notable guests often gathered and performed in the hotel's Purple Room. The Purple Room, a freestanding building behind the hotel, was used as a gathering space and music venue. It was frequented by notable musicians staying in the hotel.

Steed died in 1924. Her son ran the hotel for a few years before selling it to Mamie Burbridge. In 1951, Burbridge sold it to the Gaines family whose son, Clarence "Big House" Gaines, donated it the Upper Town Heritage Foundation.

== Hotel Metropolitan Museum ==
The hotel now houses a museum dedicated to its history. In 2021, the museum received a grant from the National Trust for Historic Preservation's African American Cultural Heritage action Fund for the purpose of restoring The Purple Room.

== See also ==
- List of museums focused on African Americans
