= Fiora =

Fiora may refer to:

== Places ==
- Fiora River, a river in northern Lazio and southern Tuscany, Italy
- Fiorano al Serio, known as "Fiorà" in the local language, a commune in Bergamo, Lombardy, Italy

== People ==
=== Persons with the given name, stagename, nickname ===
- Fiora (musician) (Fiora Cutler, also known as Amy Cutler, born 1979), a singer, songwriter, producer and orchestral composer born in Australia and based in Berlin
- Fiora Contino (1925–2017), U.S. opera conductor
- Fiora Gandolfi, widow and biographer of Helenio Herrera (1910–1997), Argentine-French soccer player

=== Persons with the surname ===
- Aaron Fiora (born 1981), Australian-rules footballer
- Mark Fiora (born 1962), Australian motorcycle racer
- Sofia Fiora, judoka for Argentina in 2023 and 2024 and Paris

== Fictional characters ==
- Fiora (Xenoblade), a fictional character from Xenoblade Chronicles
- Fiora Flynn, a fictional character from the Fiddler and Fiora novel series by Ann Maxwell
- Fiora, a fictional character from the 2010 film Demonic Toys 2
- Princess Fiora, a fictional character from the opera L'amore dei tre re
- Aura Bella Fiora (Japanese: アウラ・ベラ・フィオーラ, romanized: Aura Bera Fiōra), a fictional character from Overlord lightnovel-anime-manga; see List of Overlord (novel series) characters
- Fiora, a playable character from League of Legends

== Other uses ==
- Fioravanti (soft drink), an Ecuadoran soft drink nicknamed 'Fiora'

== See also ==
- Santa Fiora, Tuscany, Italy
  - County of Santa Fiora
- Curtitoma fiora (C. fiora), a sea snail
- Laura Fiora Rodríguez Riccomini (1957–1992), Chilean activist
- Flora (disambiguation)
- FORA (disambiguation)
- FIRA (disambiguation)
