= Bhawani Mall =

BMC Bhawani Mall
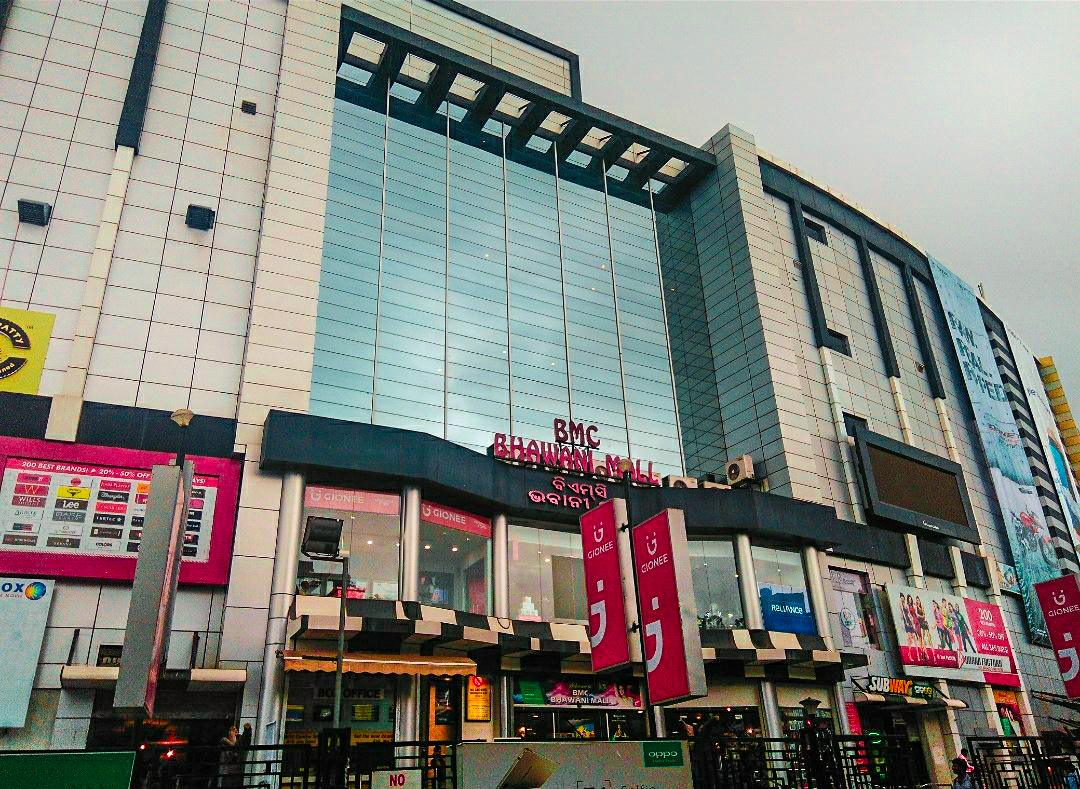
- BMC Bhawani Mall
- Location: Bhubaneswar, Odisha, India
- Coordinates: 20.27°N 85.84°E
- Opened: 2012
- Developer: Bhubaneswar Municipal Corporation
- Architect: Bhawani Constructions
- Num. of stores: 200+
- Floor area: 600,000 sq ft (56,000 m^{2})
- Floors: G+4
- Parking: Terrace
- Website: www.facebook.com/bmcbhawanimall/

BMC Bhawani Mall is a five storied shopping mall complex located at Saheed Nagar, Bhubaneswar in the state of Odisha, India. The shopping destination is spread over a floor area of six hundred thousand square feet. Publicly opened in 2012, the mall is the second largest mall in Bhubaneswar, following the Nexus Esplanade. The mall has a total commercial space of 600,000 sq ft spread over five floors designed by the Kolkata based, Bhawani Constructions. It contains above two hundred outlets, including cafeterias, food courts, restaurants, multiplex, parking space and a hypermarket.

== Specifications ==
- 100% Power Backup
- Fire Fighting System
- HVAC and AHU
- RCC Framed Earthquake Resistant

== Features ==
=== Entertainment ===
- Family Entertainment Zones
- 3-screen multiplex by INOX

=== Leisure ===
- Plaza

=== Hospitality ===
- Cafeteria
- Food Court
- Restaurants

=== Business ===
- Office Spaces

=== Others ===
- Departmental Anchors
- Hypermarket

== Fire safety measurement ==
In 2019, a raid was carried out by Odisha Fire Services department in 10 malls after a major fire at a mall at Damana Square in Bhubaneswar that found several lapses in implementation of adequate fire safety measures.
