= Forum Courtyard =

Shopping mall in South Kolkata, India

Coordinates: 22°32′18.78″N 88°21′5.14″E

Forum Courtyard, also known as Forum Mall Kolkata, is a shopping mall located in Bhowanipore, South Kolkata, India. It was initially conceived as an office tower. 80% of the foundation was complete before it was converted into a mall. Currently it has a built-up area of 200,000 square feet, of which 125,000 square feet is the gross leasable (retail) area. It was opened to the public with the sole intention of launching Shoppers' Stop in Kolkata for the first time, in 2003. Its opening was credited with turning its neighbourhood from a quiet residential area into an upmarket shopping destination. It has been noted for its excellent layout and signage. The mall is constructed and owned by Rahul Saraf, Chairman of SAPL. The Mall also has branches in Bhubaneswar(named Forum Mart) and in Belur area of Howrah(named as Forum Rangoli Mall).

The tenants are diverse, ranging from retail outlets to an INOX multiplex to dining. As of July 2003, the mall had parking space for 175 cars and planned to increase it to 700 cars in 18 months.

== Amenities ==
It has six floors, four of which are dedicated to shopping, with many brands having outlets here, some of which are: Shoppers Stop, The Label Life, Adidas, Hush Puppies, Crocs, Metro, Reebok, Crocs, Speedo, The Body Shop, Colour Bar, Forest Essentials, MAC, Vero Moda, Global Desi, Kazo. The 5th floor is a dedicated Food Court, offering fine dining outlets to traditional Bengali cuisines like Oh! Calcutta, Cafe Mezzuna, Spaghetti Kitchen and TGIF. The sixth floor is a 4-hall movie complex operated by INOX. It has a small outlet of Wow! Momo.

== Gallery ==
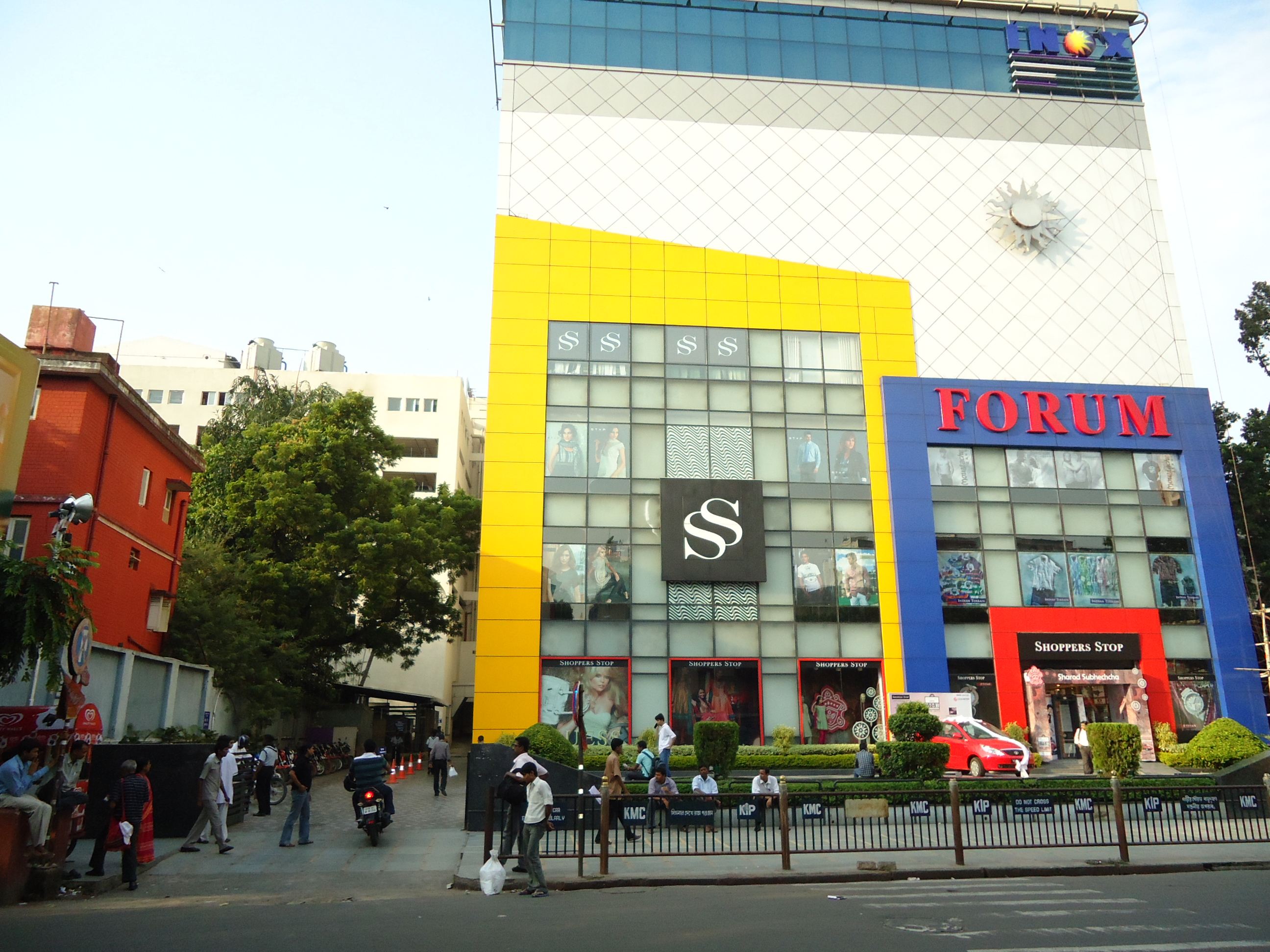
Forum Mall

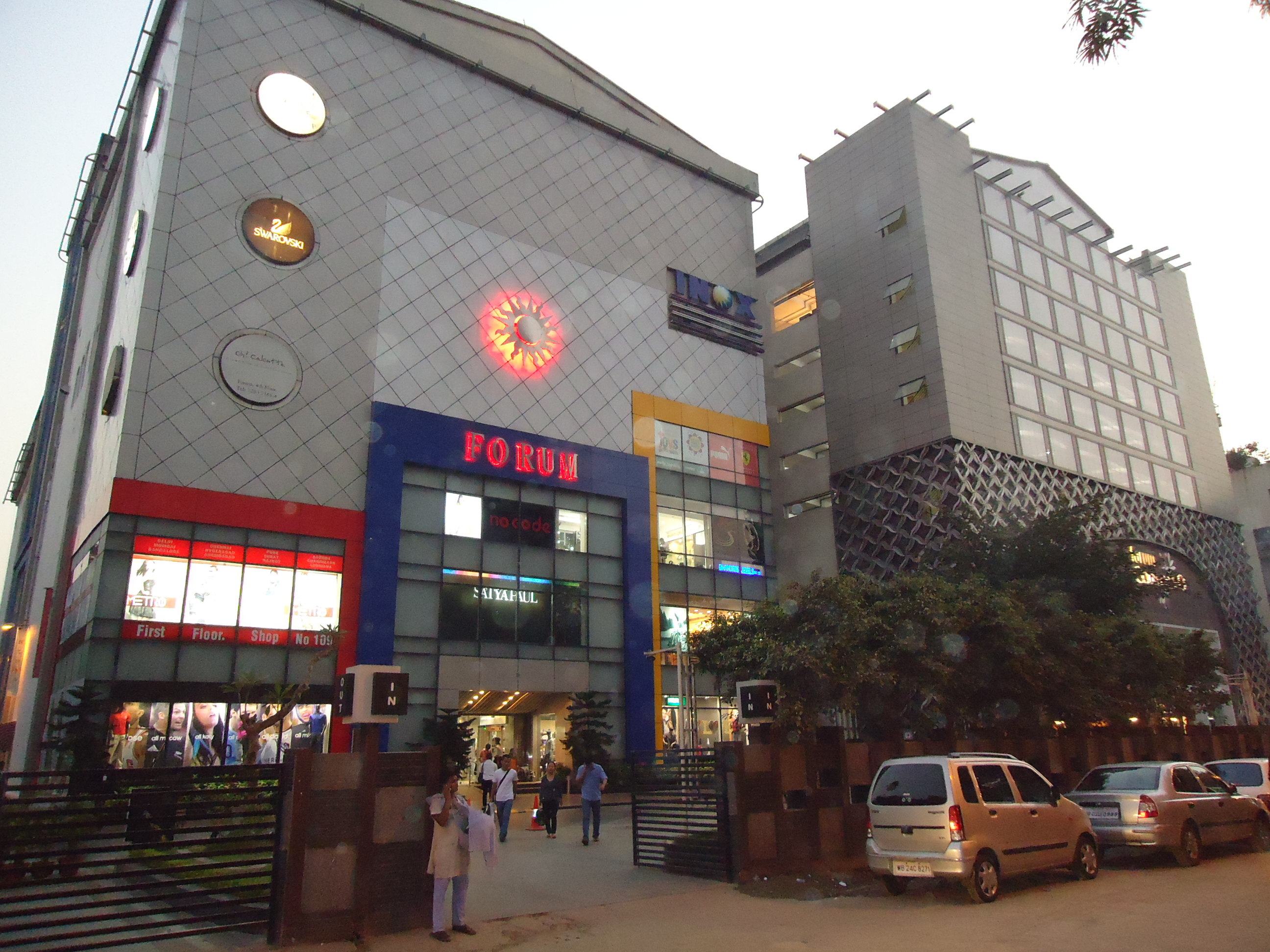
Forum & Forum Courtyard Mall

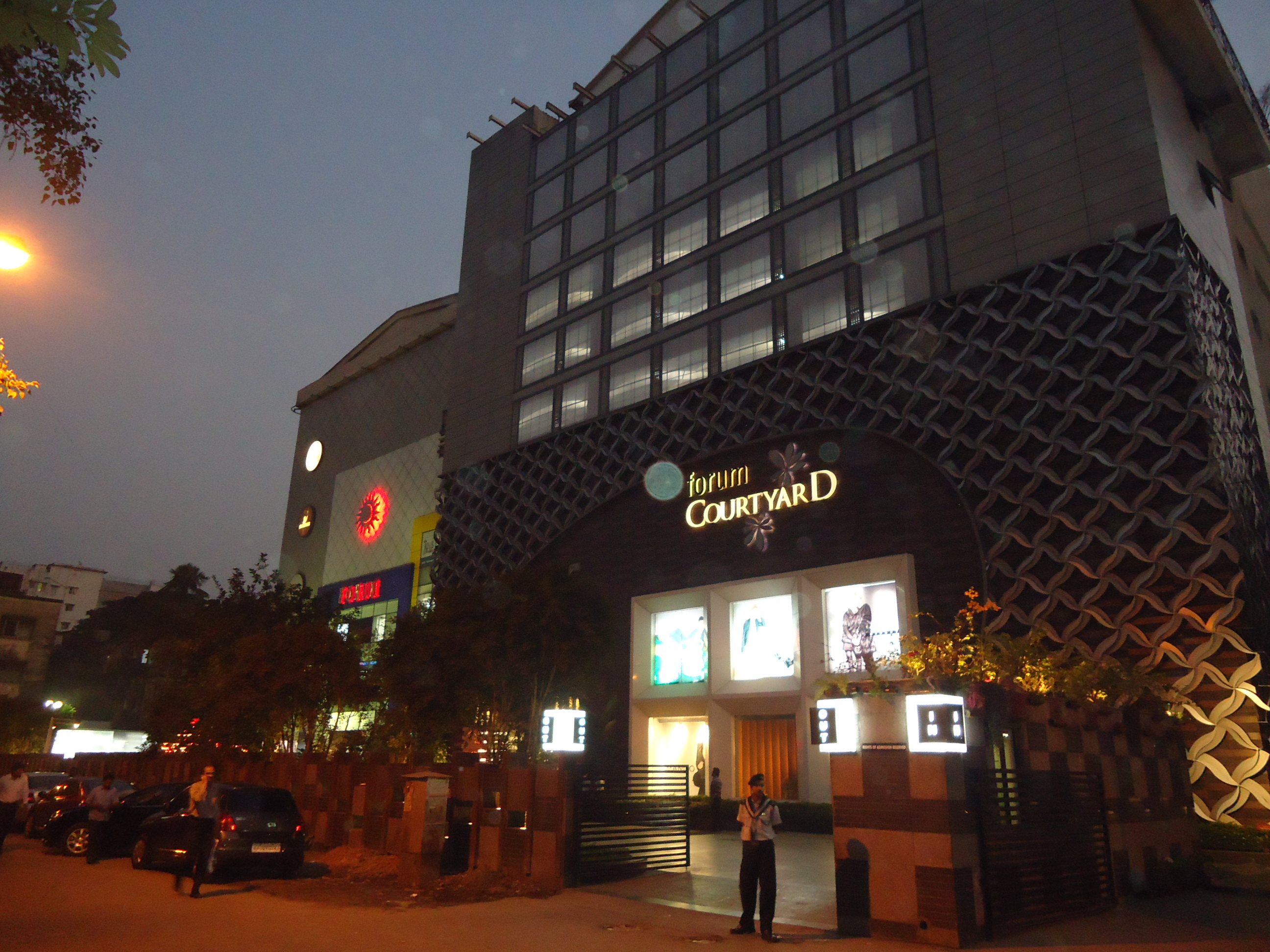
Forum & Forum Courtyard night view

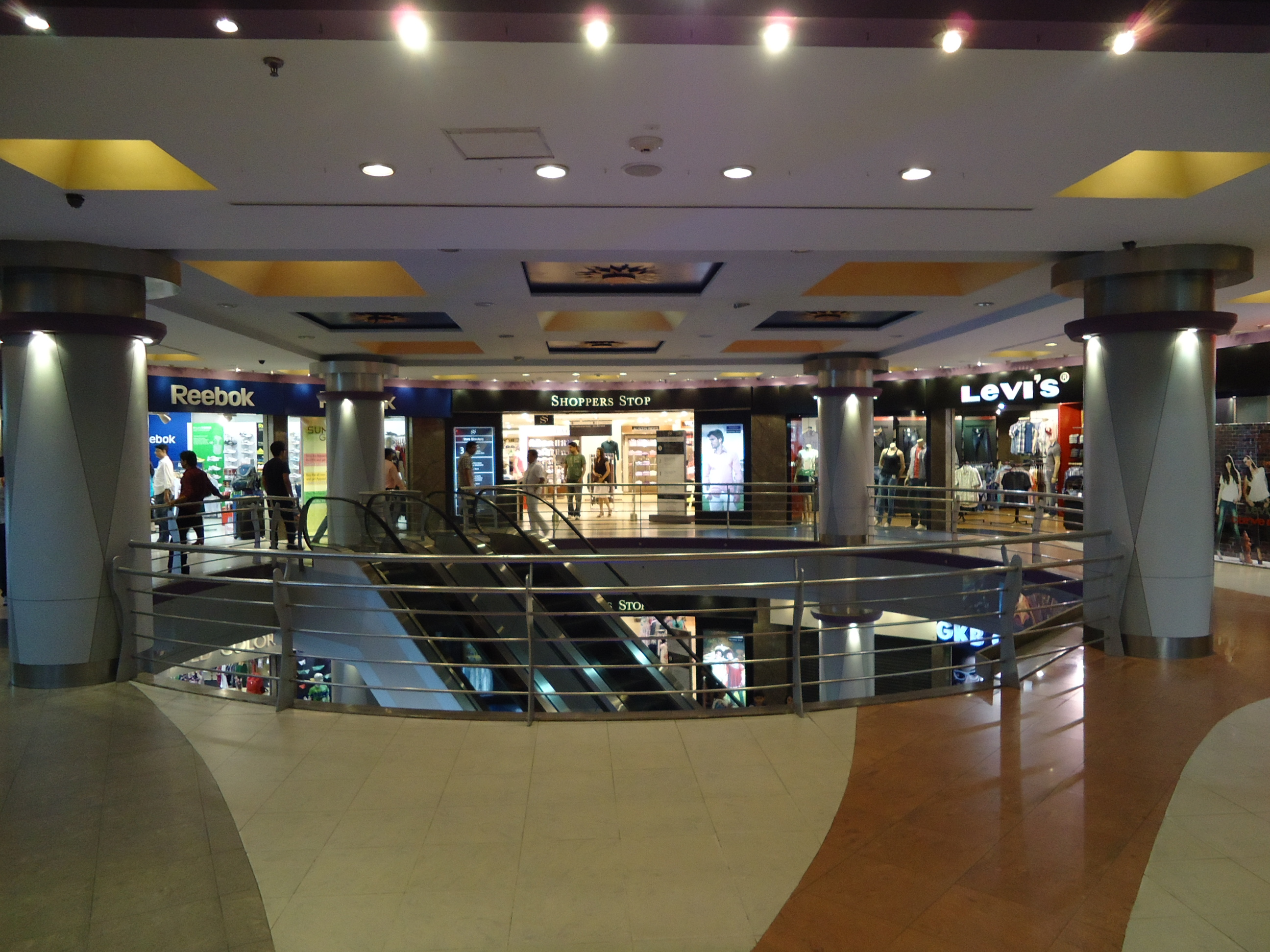
Forum Mall inside view
