= Stephanie K. Meeks =

American nonprofit executive and historic preservation leader

- Born: 1964 (age 61–62)
- Occupation: CEO
- Years active: 1990-
- Employer: Student Conservation Association
- Known for: National Trust for Historic Preservation
- Notable work: The Past and Future City

Stephanie K. Meeks (born 1964) is a long-time official in the non-profit community from Loveland, Colorado. She is best known for serving as president and CEO of the National Trust for Historic Preservation from July 2010 to December 2018.

== Presidency of the National Trust for Historic Preservation ==
During her tenure, the National Trust established a new signature program called National Treasures, which identifies significant threatened places across the United States and takes direct action through preservation, advocacy, marketing, and fundraising to save them. The current portfolio of nearly 100 historic sites includes, among other sites of note, Elkhorn Ranch, Shockoe Bottom, the Houston Astrodome, and the downtown Philadelphia gym of boxer Joe Frazier.

Under Meeks, the Trust also began an initiative called ReUrbanism to highlight the critical connection between older buildings and vibrant cities. As part of these efforts, the Trust has, through its Preservation Green Lab, spearheaded original research, data, and tools to promote the reuse and reinvestment of older and historic buildings as the default option in American cities.

In September 2016, she co-wrote a book on these issues entitled The Past and Future City: How Historic Preservation is Reviving America's Communities, published by Island Press.

Also during her tenure, the National Trust has worked to strategically reposition its portfolio of 27 historic sites to encourage creative stewardship, interpretation, and financial sustainability. As part of this work, the Trust has experimented with new models that combine commercial and non-profit uses to enhance visitor experiences and bring in additional sources of revenue.

== Other non-profit positions ==
Before joining the National Trust, Meeks spent 17 years with The Nature Conservancy, ultimately serving as their COO and acting president and CEO. She also served as director of RARE and president and CEO of Counterpart International, as the chair of the board of the Potomac Conservancy, and now serves as the president and CEO of the Student Conservation Association.
