= Forum Mart =

- Location: Bhubaneswar, Odisha, India
- Coordinates: 20.27°N 85.84°E
- Opened: 2004
- Developer: Forum Group
- Num. of stores: 50
- Floor area: 200,000 sq ft (19,000 m^{2})
- Floors: G+3
- Website: forumprojects.in/projectListing.html

Forum Mart is a shopping mall located at Janpath, Bhubaneswar in the state of Odisha, India. The shopping destination is spread over a floor area of two hundred thousand square feet. Publicly opened in 2004, the mall is one of the largest and oldest malls in Odisha. The mall has a total commercial space of 200,000 sq ft spread over four floors designed by the Forum Group. The Forum Group is known for establishing commercial complexes in India and abroad.

It contains approximately 50 outlets, including cafeterias, food courts, restaurants, parking space and a hypermarket.

== Specifications ==
- 100% Power Backup
- Fire Fighting System
- HVAC and AHU
- RCC Framed Earthquake Resistant

== Features ==
=== Leisure ===
- Plaza

=== Hospitality ===
- Cafeteria
- Food Court
- Restaurants

=== Business ===
- Office Spaces

=== Others ===
- Departmental Anchors
- Hypermarket

== Fire safety ==
An inspection by Odisha Fire Services department in 10 malls including Forum Mart found several lapses in implementation of adequate fire safety measures.
