= Nexus Esplanade =

Esplanade One
- Location: Bhubaneswar, India
- Coordinates: 20.27°N 85.84°E
- Address: Esplanade1, Puri – Cuttack Road, Rasulgarh Industrial Estate, Rasulgarh, Bhubaneswar, Odisha 751010
- Opened: 12 July 2018
- Developer: Forum Group; The Blackstone Group
- Architect: Practice Design Pvt Ltd
- Num. of stores: 200+
- Floor area: 400,000 sq ft (37,000 m^{2})
- Floors: G+9
- Parking: 1000+
- Website: Nexus Esplanade

Nexus Esplanade, formerly known as Esplanade One, is the largest shopping mall in the state of Odisha located at Bhubaneswar, designed by the Practice Design Pvt Ltd. It was developed by the Forum Group and The Blackstone Group. Nexus Esplanade has a built-up area of 9.5 lakh sqft, including 4 lakh sqft of leasable area (Retail Space & 7 Screen Multiplex). It also includes 2.5 lakh sqft of offices and 3 lakh sqft of parking. The complex is spread over 9 floors and the offices start from the third floor.

== About ==
Nexus Esplanade is located in Rasulgarh Industrial Estate Area, Bhubaneswar, Odisha, India. The mall has a total commercial (Built-up) space of 1,000,000 sq ft spread over ten floors designed by the Practice Design Pvt Ltd, with a Retail space of 400,000 sq ft. It was developed by Forum Group in association with The Blackstone Group. It has capacity to contains more than 200 outlets, including cafeterias, food courts, restaurants, family entertainment zones, multiplex and it has multi level parking.

== Events ==
- Actress and model Disha Patani inaugurated the first Marks & Spencer Store in Bhubaneswar on 14 September 2018. The event was huge success and huge crowd gathered to witness the event at Esplanade One.
- On 14 August 2018, Esplanade One organised The First Ever Midnight Sale at Odisha's No.1 Shopping & Entertainment Hub. Over 40 Brands offering 50% off. Also Get a Chance to win hourly exciting prizes including one lucky draw prize – Honda Activa 5G.
