= African American Cultural Heritage Action Fund =

Cultural program founded in 2017

The African American Cultural Heritage Action Fund is a program formed in 2017 to aid stewards of Black cultural sites throughout the United States in preserving both physical landmarks, their material collections and associated narratives. It was organized under the auspices of the National Trust for Historic Preservation. The initiative which awards grants to select applicants and advocates of Black history is led by architectural historian Brent Leggs. It is the largest program in America to preserve places associated with Black history and has currently raised over $150 million.

== History ==
The program was conceived as a means towards creating greater resilience and capacity for sensitive and threatened places that tell the stories of Black American history. Support from the fund has aided the stabilization and restoration of numerous structures and properties from churches to cemeteries, from the Harriet Tubman Home in Auburn, New York to the Cleveland Public Theater in Ohio. The Action Fund has an advisory council which includes Ford Foundation president Darren Walker, literary critic and author Henry Louis Gates Jr., educator and historian Lonnie Bunch and actress Phylicia Rashad to name a few. Donors to the Fund have included philanthropist MacKenzie Scott who made a $20 million gift in 2021.

Since it was started, it has given grants to more than 300 preservation projects in overlooked communities across the United States.

Simultaneously to fixing dilapidated or threatened bricks and mortar projects, the goal of the fund is also to effect social change in neglected neighborhoods. The award of monies for the reuse and revitalization of culturally meaningful structures and landscapes results in a positive benefit for marginalized residents. Restoration of the home of blues artist Muddy Waters for example is less about just repairing a house - it is also about creating a venue for other musicians to be inspired and perhaps record their own music.

=== Preserving Black Churches Project ===
According to Leggs, its executive director, the Action Fund next plans to partner with Black churches as part of an investment in revitalizing community religious centers. A donation of $20 million to the Preserving Black Churches Project was announced on Martin Luther King Day in January 2022. The gift was made by the Lilly Endowment, one of the largest endowments in the United States.

== Grantees ==
In 2018, $1 million was awarded to 16 projects.

- August Wilson House (Pittsburgh, Pennsylvania)
- African American Homesteader Sites (New Mexico, Colorado, Nebraska, Kansas, and South Dakota)
- Buffalo Soldiers at Yosemite (Yosemite, California)
- Civil Rights Sites of Birmingham (Birmhingam, Alabama)
- Freedom House Museum and Virginia National Urban League Headquarters (Alexandria, Virginia)
- The Grand Old Lady (Washington, D.C.)
- Historic Roxbury (Boston, Massachusetts)
- John and Alice Coltrane Home (Huntington, New York)
- Mars Hill Anderson Rosenwald School (Marshall, North Carolina)
- Mary and Eliza Freeman Houses (Bridgeport, Connecticut)
- Mountain View Black Officers Club (Fort Huachuca, Arizona)
- Shockoe Bottom (Richmond, Virginia)
- South Side Community Art Center (Chicago, Illinois)
- Tuskegee University Rosenwald School Program (Tuskegee, Alabama)
- Weeksville's Hunterfly Row Houses (Brooklyn, New York)
- Wilfandel Clubhouse (Los Angeles, California)

In 2019, $1.6 million was awarded to 22 projects and funding came through the Mellon Foundation.

- African Meeting House (Boston, Massachusetts)
- Alabama Historical Commission (Alabama)
- Clinton African Methodist Episcopal Zion Church (Great Barrington, Massachusetts)
- Emanuel African Methodist Episcopal Church (Charleston, South Carolina)
- Emmett and Mamie Till Interpretive Center (Sumner, Mississippi)
- Explored Landscapes of Afro-Virginia (Virginia)
- The Forum (Chicago, Illinois)
- God's Little Acre (Newport, Rhode Island)
- Harriet Tubman Home (Auburn, New York)
- Historic Evergreen Cemetery (Richmond, Virginia)
- Historic Westside Las Vegas (Las Vegas, Nevada)
- Hutchinson House (Edisto Island, South Carolina)
- Langston Hughes House (Harlem, New York)
- McGee Avenue Baptist Church, Stuart Street Apartments (Berkeley, California)
- Morris Brown College's Fountain Hall (Atlanta, Georgia)
- Oregon Black Pioneers Corporation, (Oregon)
- Pauli Murray Home and Center for History and Social Justice (Durham, North Carolina)
- Satchel Paige House, (Kansas City, Missouri)
- South Carolina African American Heritage Foundation, (South Carolina)
- Texas Endangered Historic Black Settlements & Cemeteries (Texas)
- Treme Neighborhood Revival Grants Program (New Orleans, Louisiana)
- Wright Building (Deland, Florida)

In 2020, 27 grants were awarded totaling $1.6 million in funding.

- Africatown Heritage Preservation (Mobile, Alabama)
- The Historic Vernon A.M.E Church (Tulsa, Oklahoma)
- Founder's Church of Religious Science (Los Angeles, California)
- While We Are Still Here (Harlem, New York City, New York)
- The Clifton House (Baltimore, Maryland)
- Sweet Auburn Works (Atlanta, Georgia)
- Lewis H. Latimer House (Flushing, New York)
- Maxville Heritage Interpretive Center (Joseph, Oregon)
- Historic Mitchelville Freedom Park (Hilton Head, South Carolina)
- National Center of Afro-American Artists at Abbotsford (Roxbury, Massachusetts)
- Association of African American Museums (AAAM) (Washington, D.C.)
- AACHAF Vision Grant: City of Minneapolis (Minneapolis, Minnesota)
- Muddy Waters Mojo Museum (Chicago, Illinois)
- Paul Robeson House (Philadelphia, Pennsylvania)
- Historic Brockway Center and Historic Lyons Mansion (Oklahoma City, Oklahoma)
- Omaha Star Publishing Company (Omaha, Nebraska)
- Historic Dennis Farm House (Brooklyn Township, Pennsylvania)
- Historic McDonogh 19 Principal's Office/ The Leona Tate Foundation for Change (New Orleans, Louisiana)
- The Tenth Street Historic District (Dallas, Texas)
- Clayborn Temple (Memphis, Tennessee)
- Sweetwater Foundation (Chicago, Illinois)
- May's Lick Rosenwald School (Maysville, Kentucky)
- Mapping C’ville (Charlottesville, Virginia)
- Banneker-Douglass Museum Foundation (Annapolis, Maryland)
- Florida African American Heritage Preservation Network (Tallahassee, Florida)
- Georgia African American Historic Preservation Network (Georgia)
- Montana State Historic Preservation Office (Montana)

In 2021, 40 recipients were recognized by the African American Cultural Heritage Action Fund and $3 million in monies was disbursed.

- African American Heritage Trail of Martha's Vineyard (West Tisbury, Massachusetts)
- Alabama African American Civil Rights Consortium (Birmingham, Alabama)
- Asbury United Methodist Church (Washington, D.C.)
- Black American West Museum and Heritage Center (Denver, Colorado)
- Cherokee State Resort Historical Park (Hardin, Kentucky)
- Firestation 23, Byrd Barr Place (Seattle, Washington)
- Fort Monroe Foundation (Fort Monroe, Virginia)
- 4theVille (St. Louis, Missouri)
- Georgia B. Williams Nursing Home (Camilla, Georgia)
- Hampton University (Hampton, Virginia)
- Hayti Heritage Center, St. Joseph's Historic Foundation (Durham, North Carolina)
- Historic Athens (Athens, Georgia)
- History Colorado (Denver, Colorado)
- Hotel Metropolitan Purple Room (Paducah, Kentucky)
- Houston Freedmen's Town Conservancy, (Houston, Texas)
- Huston–Tillotson University (Austin, Texas)
- Indiana Landmarks (Indianapolis, Indiana)
- Karamu House (Cleveland, Ohio)
- The League of Women for Community Service, (Boston, Massachusetts)
- Montpelier Descendants Committee (Orange, Virginia)
- Mount Zion Baptist Church, (Athens, Ohio)
- National Marian Anderson Historical Society and Museum (Philadelphia, Pennsylvania)
- National Negro Opera Company (Pittsburgh, Pennsylvania)
- New Granada Theater, Hill CDC (Pittsburgh, Pennsylvania)
- North Carolina African American Heritage Commission (Raleigh, North Carolina)
- Oakland Public Library (Oakland, California)
- Descendants of Olivewood Cemetery (Houston, Texas)
- Palmer Pharmacy Building, Bluegrass Trust for Historic Preservation (Lexington, Kentucky)
- Para la Naturaleza (San Juan, Puerto Rico)
- People's AME Zion Church, The People's Community Development Corporation (Syracuse, New York)
- Prince Hall Masonic Lodge (Atlanta, Georgia)
- Roberts Temple Church of God in Christ (Chicago, Illinois)
- Robbins Historical Society and Museum (Robbins, Illinois)
- City of Sacramento (Sacramento, California)
- Sapelo Island Cultural and Revitalization Society (Sapelo, Georgia)
- Sarah Rector Mansion (Kansas City, Missouri)
- Save Harlem Now! (New York, New York)
- St. Simon's African American Heritage Coalition (St. Simon's, Georgia)
- Threatt Filling Station (Luther, Oklahoma)
- Walnut Cove Colored School (Walnut Cove, North Carolina)

In 2022, 33 recipients were recognized by the African American Cultural Heritage Action Fund and $3 million in monies was disbursed.

- Anne Spencer House & Garden (Lynchburg, Virginia)
- Home of Mamie Till Mobley and Emmett Till (Blacks in Green, Chicago, Illinois)
- Billy Webb Elks Lodge #1050 (Portland, Oregon)
- Chicago's African American Historic Neighborhoods and Landmarks (Chicago, Illinois)
- Home of Nettie Asberry (Tacoma, Washington)
- Home and Studio of Faith Ringgold (Englewood, New Jersey)
- Michigan Street African American Heritage Corridor (Buffalo, New York)
- Union Academy Neighborhood (Tarpon Springs, Florida)
- Cleveland's Black Churches (Cleveland, Ohio)
- Maryfield Cemetery (Daufuskie Island, South Carolina)
- Statewide Documentation of Jim Crow Segregation in New Mexico (Santa Fe, New Mexico)
- Louis Armstrong House Museum (Corona, New York)
- Pennsylvania's Cemeteries and Burial Grounds (Harrisburg, Pennsylvania)
- Home of Medgar & Myrlie Evers (Jackson, Mississippi)
- Southern West Virginia African American Heritage Tour (Oak Hill, West Virginia)
- The Turf Club (Asbury Park, New Jersey)
- Okahumpka Rosenwald School (Okahumpka, Florida)
- Blue Bird Inn (Detroit, Michigan)
- Eldorado Ballroom (Houston, Texas)
- Quinn Chapel AME (Louisville, Kentucky)
- Second Baptist Church of Los Angeles (Los Angeles, California)
- Brown Chapel African Methodist Episcopal Church (Selma, Alabama)
- Shaw University's Tyler Hall (Raleigh, North Carolina)
- Historic Kappa House (Washington, D.C.)
- Stillman College's Winsborough Hall (Tuscaloosa, Alabama)
- James Weldon Johnson's Writing Cabin (Great Barrington, Massachusetts)
- Home of Dr. Robert Walter “Whirlwind” Johnson (Lynchburg, Virginia)
- Mound Bayou Bank (Jackson, Mississippi)
- Whitney Plantation's Store (Wallace, Louisiana)
- Coggswell-Taylor House and Jackson Street Store (Virginia City, Montana)
- Dumas Pharmacy Building (Natchez, Mississippi)
- King Solomon Masonic Lodge #1 (New Bern, North Carolina)
- Buffalo Soldiers National Museum (Houston, Texas)

In 2023, 40 sites were awarded $3.8 million.

- Black Heritage Trail of New Hampshire (Portsmouth, New Hampshire)
- Freedom Quilting Bee Manufacturing Building (Alberta, Alabama)
- Lincoln Theatre (Los Angeles, California)
- Elktonia Beach Heritage Park (Annapolis, Maryland)
- Peter Bug Shoe Academy (Washington, D.C.)
- Morgan School (Charlotte, North Carolina)
- Sites of Alonzo Robinson (Milwaukee, Wisconsin)
- Idlewild's Hotel Casa Blanca (Idlewide, Michigan)
- Cape Charles Rosenwald School (Cape Charles, Virginia)
- Neosho Colored School (Diamond, Missouri)
- Casa Cortijo at El Ancón de Loíza (Loíza, Puerto Rico)
- Southgate Street School (Newport, Kentucky)
- Henry Ossawa Tanner House (Philadelphia, Pennsylvania)
- Nantucket's African Meeting House (Nantucket, Massachusetts)
- Menifee Gymnasium (Menifee, Arkansas)
- YMI Cultural Center (Asheville, North Carolina)
- United Order of Tents Eastern District #3 (Brooklyn, New York)
- L.V. Hull Home & Studio (Kosciusko, Mississippi)
- The Slave Dwelling Project (Lasdon, South Carolina)
- Dew Drop Inn (New Orleans, Louisiana)
- St. Johns County African American Heritage Trail (St. Augustine, Florida)
- Sheridan County Iron Riders Historic Trail (Sheridan, Wyoming)
- (Un)Known Project Augmented Reality App (Louisville, Kentucky)
- Calfee Training School (Pulaski, Virginia)
- Mount Zion Cemetery and Female Union Band Society Cemetery (Washington, D.C.)
- Independence Heights (Houston, Texas)
- Charles McAfee Swimming Pool and Pool House (Wichita, Kansas)
- Watts Happening Cultural Center (Los Angeles, California)
- Carson City Hall Building (Carson, California)
- First Baptist Church-West (Charlotte, North Carolina)
- Fourth Baptist Church's Educational Wing (Richmond, Virginia)
- Morgan State University's Jenkins Hall (Baltimore, Maryland)
- Second Baptist Church of Detroit's Education Building (Detroit, Michigan)
- Zion Baptist Church (Philadelphia, Pennsylvania)
- Morris College (Sumter, South Carolina)
- Talladega College (Talladega, Alabama)
- Dillard University (New Orleans, Louisiana)
- Tuskegee University (Tuskegee, Alabama)
- Hampton University's Historic Landscape (Hampton, Virginia)
- Jarvis Christian University's Florence Robinson Cottage (Hawkins, Texas)

In 2024, 30 sites were awarded $3 million.

- Alpha Gamma Omega House (Los Angeles, California)
- Alonzo Chatmon's Juke Joint (Water Valley, Mississippi)
- Imperial Hotel (Thomasville, Georgia)
- Shady Rest Golf and Country Club (Scotch Plains, New Jersey)
- Pierce Chapel African Cemetery (Midland, Georgia)
- New Amsterdam Musical Association Building (Harlem, New York)
- Erma Hayman House (Boise, Idaho)
- Woodlawn Cemetery (Bronx, New York)
- Wabash Avenue YMCA (Chicago, Illinois)
- Lefferts Historic House (Brooklyn, New York)
- Nicodemus Historical Society & Museum (Bogue, Kansas)
- Greater Cincinnati Black and African American Historic Context Study (Cincinnati, Ohio)
- Chickasaw Park (Louisville, Kentucky)
- Kennett Underground Railroad Center (KURC) (Chadds Ford, Kennett Township, Pennsylvania)
- Kennard High School at the Kennard African American Cultural Heritage Center & Museum (Centreville, Maryland)
- Brainerd Institute (Chester, South Carolina)
- Gaithersburg Community Museum (Gaithersburg, Maryland)
- George W. Hubbard House (Nashville, Tennessee)
- Camp Katharine Parsons Nature House (Minneapolis, Minnesota)
- Simms/Gray-Lewis Cottage (Houston, Texas)
- Unita Blackwell Freedom House (Jackson, Mississippi)
- Pine Grove Washington-Rosenwald School (Richmond, Virginia)
- Ira Aldridge Theater (Washington, D.C.)
- Robert T. Coles Home and Studio (Buffalo, New York)
- Masjid Muhammad, Nation's Mosque (Washington, D.C.)
- John F. Kennedy Community Center (Buffalo, New York)
- Claude B. Dansby, Benjamin G. Brawley, and John H. Wheeler Halls at Morehouse College (Atlanta, Georgia)
- Universal Life Insurance Company Building (Memphis, Tennessee)
- Kenneth G. Neigh Dormitory Complex at the former Mary Holmes Community College (West Point, Mississippi)
- Azurest South, Amaza Lee Meredith Home and Studio (Petersburg, Virginia)

In 2025, 24 sites were awarded $3 million.

- Berry College African American Cemeteries (Mount Berry, Georgia)
- Lewis H. Latimer House Museum (Flushing, New York)
- Gibbs Cottage (Tallahassee, Florida)
- Sylvester Manor Educational Farm (Shelter Island, NY)
- Historic Brooklyn, Illinois (Brooklyn, Illinois)
- Jewel Theater (Oklahoma City, Oklahoma)
- Colored Knights of Pythias, Indianapolis (Indianapolis, Indiana)
- Letitia Carson Legacy Project (Corvallis, Oregon)
- Town of Glendora (Glendora, Mississippi)
- Tom Lee House: Klondike Cultural Center (Memphis, Tennessee)
- Apollo Theater (Harlem, New York)
- Woodville School (Gloucester, Virginia)
- Muddy Waters Mojo Museum (Chicago, Illinois)
- Olivewood Cemetery (Houston, Texas)
- Bibb House and Bibbtown Church-Cemetery (Russellville, Kentucky)
- Clemmons Family Farm (Charlotte, Vermont)
- The Custom House (Chestertown, Maryland)
- Dr. James & Janie Washington Cultural Center (Seattle, Washington)
- Highlander Research and Education Center (New Market, Tennessee)
- Founders Church of Religious Science (Los Angeles, California)
- 2500 New Hackensack (Poughkeepsie, New York)
- Administration Building, Interdenominational Theological Center (Atlanta, Georgia)
- McKenzie Hall, University of Oregon (Eugene, Oregon)
- First Church of Deliverance (Chicago, Illinois)
