= UDP-3-O-(3-hydroxymyristoyl)glucosamine N-acyltransferase =

Identifiers
- EC no.: 2.3.1.191

Databases
- IntEnz: IntEnz view
- BRENDA: BRENDA entry
- ExPASy: NiceZyme view
- KEGG: KEGG entry
- MetaCyc: metabolic pathway
- PRIAM: profile
- PDB structures: RCSB PDB PDBe PDBsum
Search
- PMC: articles
- PubMed: articles
- NCBI: proteins

UDP-3-O-(3-hydroxymyristoyl)glucosamine N-acyltransferase (EC 2.3.1.191, UDP-3-O-acyl-glucosamine N-acyltransferase, UDP-3-O-(R-3-hydroxymyristoyl)-glucosamine N-acyltransferase, acyltransferase LpxD, acyl-ACP:UDP-3-O-(3-hydroxyacyl)-GlcN N-acyltransferase, firA (gene), lpxD (gene)) is an enzyme with systematic name (3R)-3-hydroxymyristoyl-(acyl-carrier protein):UDP-3-O-((3R)-3-hydroxymyristoyl)-alpha-D-glucosamine N-acetyltransferase. This enzyme catalyses the following chemical reaction

(3R)-3-hydroxymyristoyl-[acyl-carrier protein] + UDP-3-O-[(3R)-3-hydroxymyristoyl]-alpha-D-glucosamine $\rightleftharpoons$ UDP-2,3-bis[O-(3R)-3-hydroxymyristoyl]-alpha-D-glucosamine + holo-[acyl-carrier protein]

The enzyme catalyses a step of lipid A biosynthesis.
