= National Trust for Historic Preservation =

US nonprofit organization

- Formation: Act of Congress, October 26, 1949
- Type: nonprofit, member-supported
- Headquarters: Washington, D.C., U.S.
- Members: approximately 300,000
- President: Brent Leggs
- Main organ: Board of Trustees
- Website: savingplaces.org

The National Trust for Historic Preservation is a privately funded, nonprofit organization based in Washington, D.C., that works in the field of historic preservation in the United States. The member-supported organization was founded in 1949 by congressional charter to support the preservation of America's diverse historic buildings, neighborhoods, and heritage through its programs, resources, and advocacy.

== Overview ==
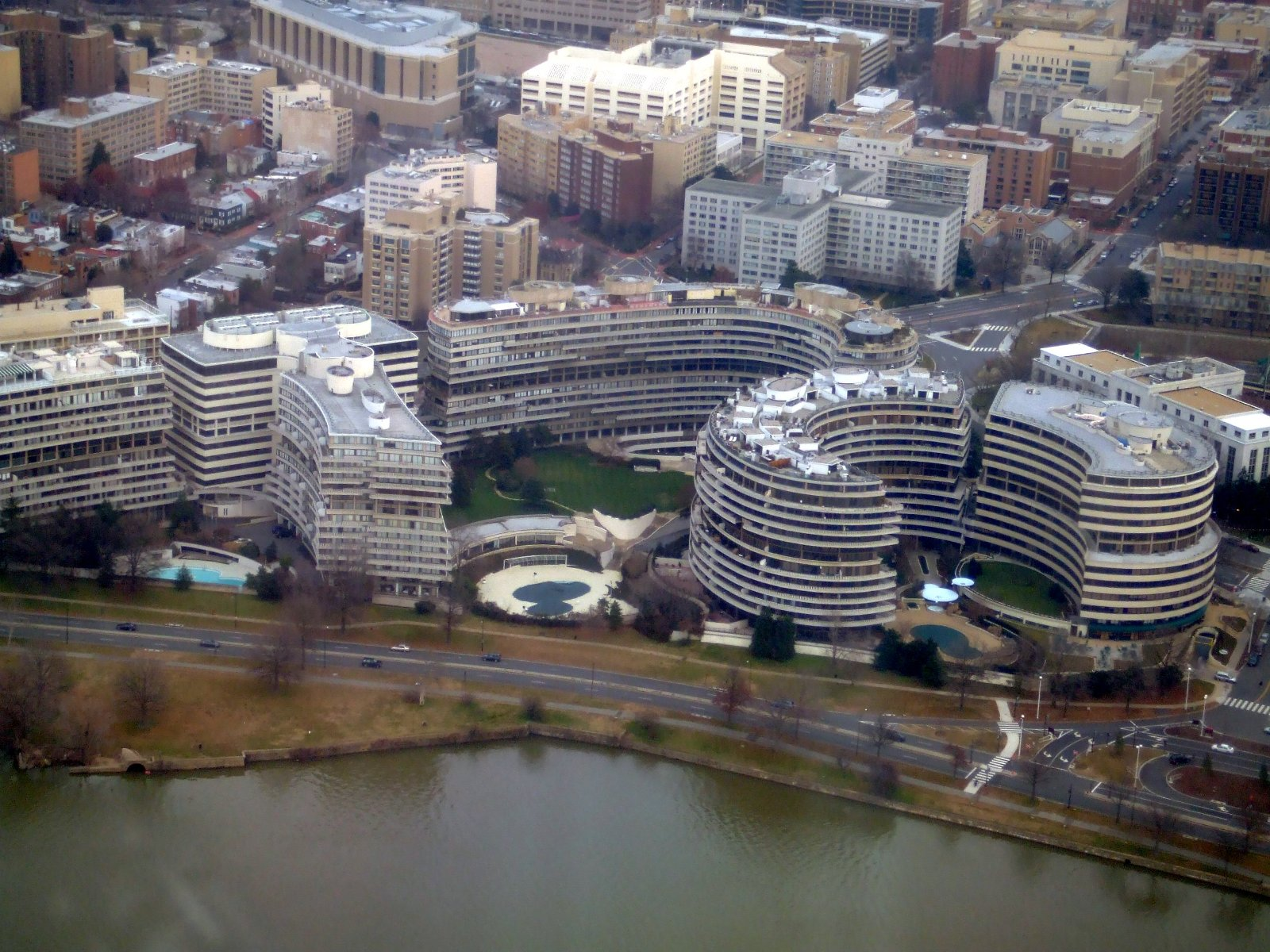
The National Trust for Historic Preservation was headquartered in the Watergate complex, Washington, D.C.

The National Trust for Historic Preservation aims to empower local preservationists by providing leadership to save and revitalize America's historic places, and by working on both national policies as well as local preservation campaigns through its network of field offices and preservation partners, including the National Park Service, State Historic Preservation Offices, and local preservation groups.

The National Trust is headquartered in Washington, D.C., with field operations located throughout the country. The organization is governed by a board of trustees and led by president & CEO, Carol Quillen. As of November 2023, the National Trust reports that it has over 1 million actively engaged visitors, followers, supporters, and advocates.

In addition to leading campaigns and advocacy, the National Trust provides a growing educational resource through the Preservation Leadership Forum, which offers articles, journals, case studies, and conferences and training. The National Trust issues the quarterly Preservation magazine as well as online stories.

The National Trust's current work focuses on building sustainable communities through the adaptive reuse of historic spaces; preserving and empowering cultural diversity through protecting sites of cultural significance; advocating for greater stewardship of historic places on public land; and leading innovation in the management of historic properties.

== History ==
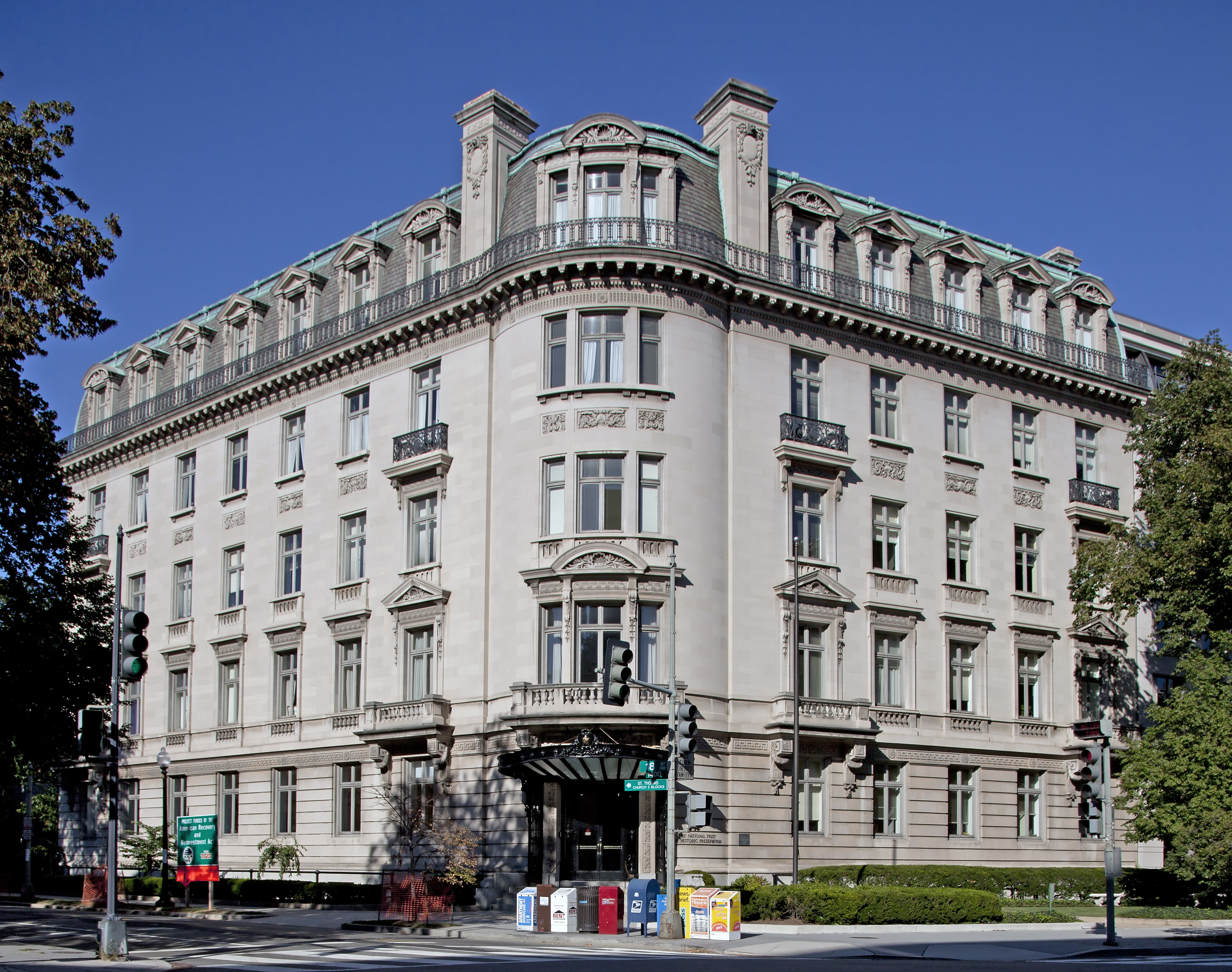
The National Trust for Historic Preservation's former headquarters of 35 years, the Andrew Mellon Building, located in the Dupont Circle neighborhood of Washington, D.C. The National Trust moved its headquarters to the Watergate complex in 2013.

Toward the end of the 19th century, in response to increased immigration and the broad effort of rebuilding after the Civil War, the country was developing a renewed sense of national identity and history. The government began to enact legislation for the preservation of sites and objects deemed significant to the nation's history. In 1872, an Act of Congress established the first National Park, Yellowstone. In 1906, the Antiquities Act enabled the President to declare landmarks or objects as a national monument. Then in 1935, during the Great Depression, Congress passed the Historic Sites Act, which outlined programs for research and inventory of historic sites.

Meanwhile, historic preservation initiatives existed on local and state levels. In 1931, Charleston, South Carolina, created the first historic district for protection. However, efforts to save and maintain historic sites were still largely limited to private citizens or local groups.

In the late 1940s, leaders in American historic preservation saw the need for a national organization to support local preservation efforts. In 1946, David E. Finley Jr., George McAneny, Christopher Crittenden, and Ronald Lee met at the National Gallery of Art to discuss the formation of such a national organization. This meeting was followed by a larger gathering on April 15, 1947, attended by representatives from a number of art, architectural, and historical societies, which culminated in the creation of the National Council for Historic Sites and Buildings. The meeting's attendants became the first charter members of the council. The organization's first headquarters was in the offices of Ford's Theatre (Lincoln Museum) in downtown Washington, D.C.

The Council pursued the formation of a National Trust for Historic Preservation, somewhat modeled on the British National Trust, which would be tasked with the acquisition and maintenance of historic properties. The creation of the National Trust was proposed as a bill to Congress, H.R. 5170, introduced by Congressman J. Hardin Peterson of Florida and passed.

The private, nonprofit National Trust for Historic Preservation was formally established by charter through the Act of Congress when President Harry S. Truman signed the legislation on October 26, 1949. The charter provided that the Trust should acquire and preserve historic sites and objects of national significance and provide annual reports to Congress on its activities. Finley served as the National Trust's first chairman of the board, remaining in the position for 12 years. Archaeologist Richard Hubbard Howland became the nonprofit's first president in 1956.

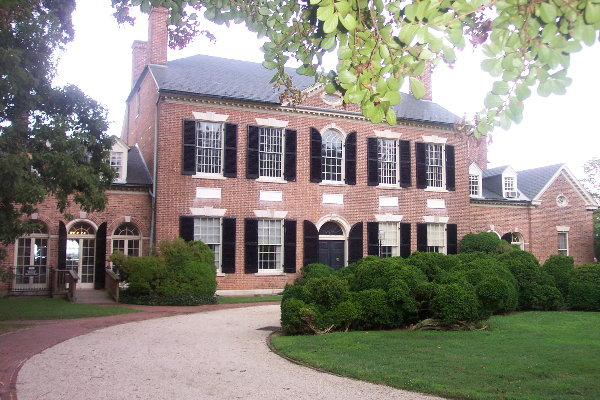
Woodlawn Plantation & Pope-Leighey House, Alexandria, Virginia, was the first site acquired for the National Trust portfolio

The National Trust and the National Council existed side by side for several years until the need to merge resources compelled the executive committee to integrate the two entities. In 1952, the boards of both organizations approved a merger of the Council into the National Trust. The merger was effective the following year and was completed by 1956. The National Trust became a membership organization and assumed all other functions of the National Council.

In its early years, the National Trust's founders envisioned an organization whose primary purpose would be the acquisition and administration of historic sites, while encouraging public participation in their preservation. In 1957, the National Trust officially acquired its first property, Woodlawn Plantation in northern Virginia. Since then, the National Trust portfolio of historic properties and contracted affiliates has expanded to include twenty-seven historic sites, ranging from the 18th-century Drayton Hall in South Carolina to the Modernist Glass House in Connecticut.

Over the next decade, the National Trust grew to become the leading national organization in historic preservation. They began working with citizens and city planning officials on legislative matters, including federal, state, and municipal ordinances for historic preservation. National Trust staff also traveled to parts of the country to advise local communities on preservation projects.

In 1966, Congress passed the National Historic Preservation Act, significant legislation for the preservation movement. The Act also provided federal funding in support of the National Trust's work. The funding later ceased in 1996, at which point the National Trust became entirely privately funded.

Following the adoption of the National Historic Preservation Act, the National Trust broadened in its mission beyond administering historic sites. In 1969, the National Trust created the Preservation Services Fund to provide financial assistance to local preservation projects. In 1971, the National Trust opened its first field office in San Francisco. As the organization grew, the National Trust expanded its work, consisting of programs, educational resources, and advocacy. In 1980, the National Trust initiated the National Main Street Center, specializing in revitalizing historic business districts, which has since transitioned into a subsidiary.

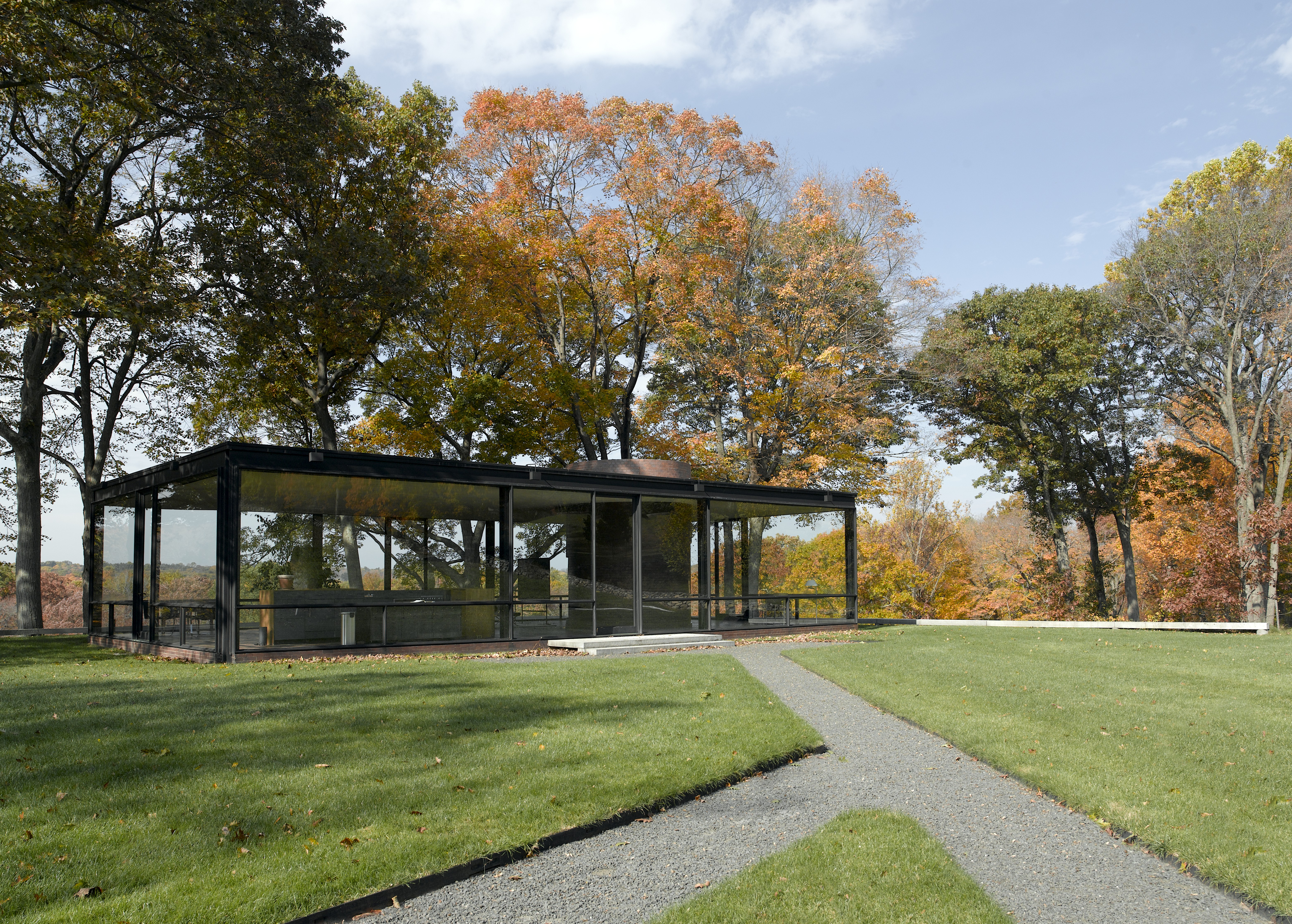
The portfolio of National Trust sites has expanded to include Philip Johnson's Glass House in New Canaan, Connecticut.

In 2010, Stephanie Meeks became the organization's president, replacing Richard Moe, who had led the organization for 17 years.

In 2013, the National Trust headquarters moved from the Andrew Mellon Building on 1785 Massachusetts Avenue, NW in Washington D.C.'s Dupont Circle to the historic Watergate office complex. Meeks said in a statement about the move, "The selection of the Watergate demonstrates our ongoing commitment to recognizing and protecting important places from every era in American history, including the recent past." In 2022, the National Trust headquarters moved from the Watergate to a shared coworking space (located in a former Garfinckel's department store) in downtown D.C.

The National Trust's programs include publication of the annual list of America's 11 Most Endangered Historic Places, first issued in 1988, which highlights endangered sites across the country.

Meeks stepped down as president in December 2018. Former general counsel and chief legal officer Paul Edmondson then served as president and CEO until the spring of 2023.

Beginning in January 2024, Carol Quillen, former president of Davidson College, began serving as president and CEO.

== Programs ==
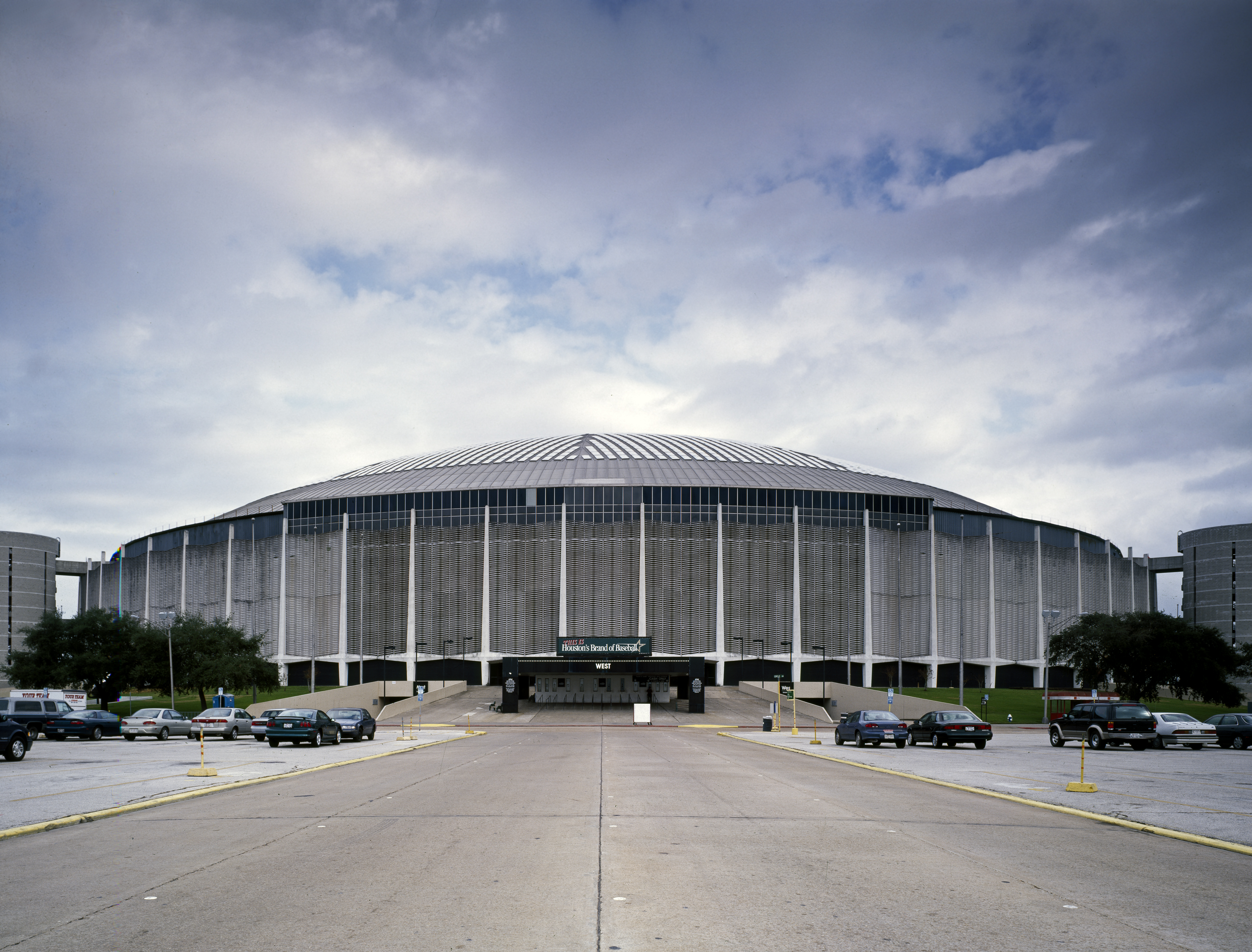
The Houston Astrodome is one of the National Trust's National Treasures.

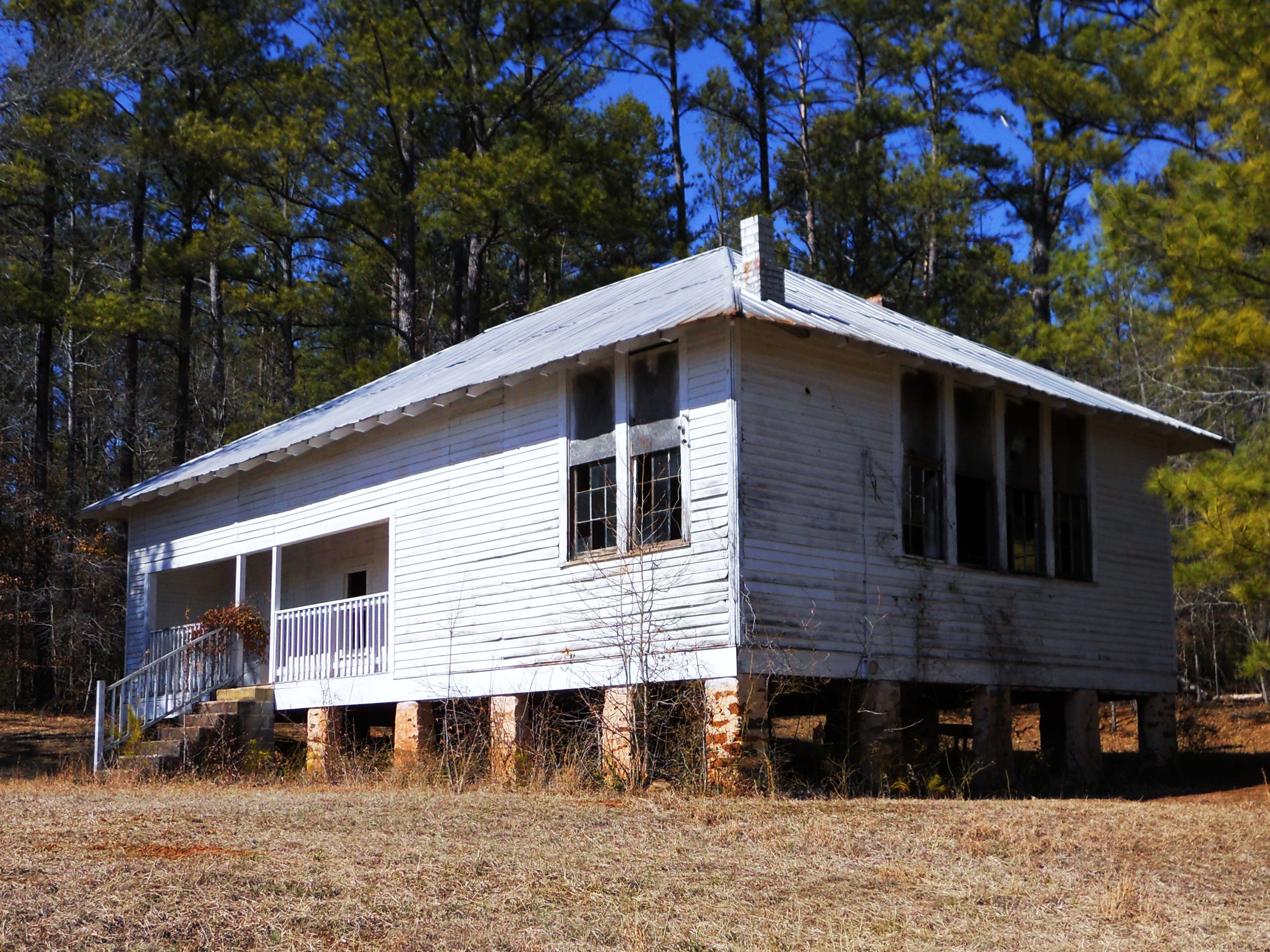
The historic Rosenwald Schools are named a National Treasure.

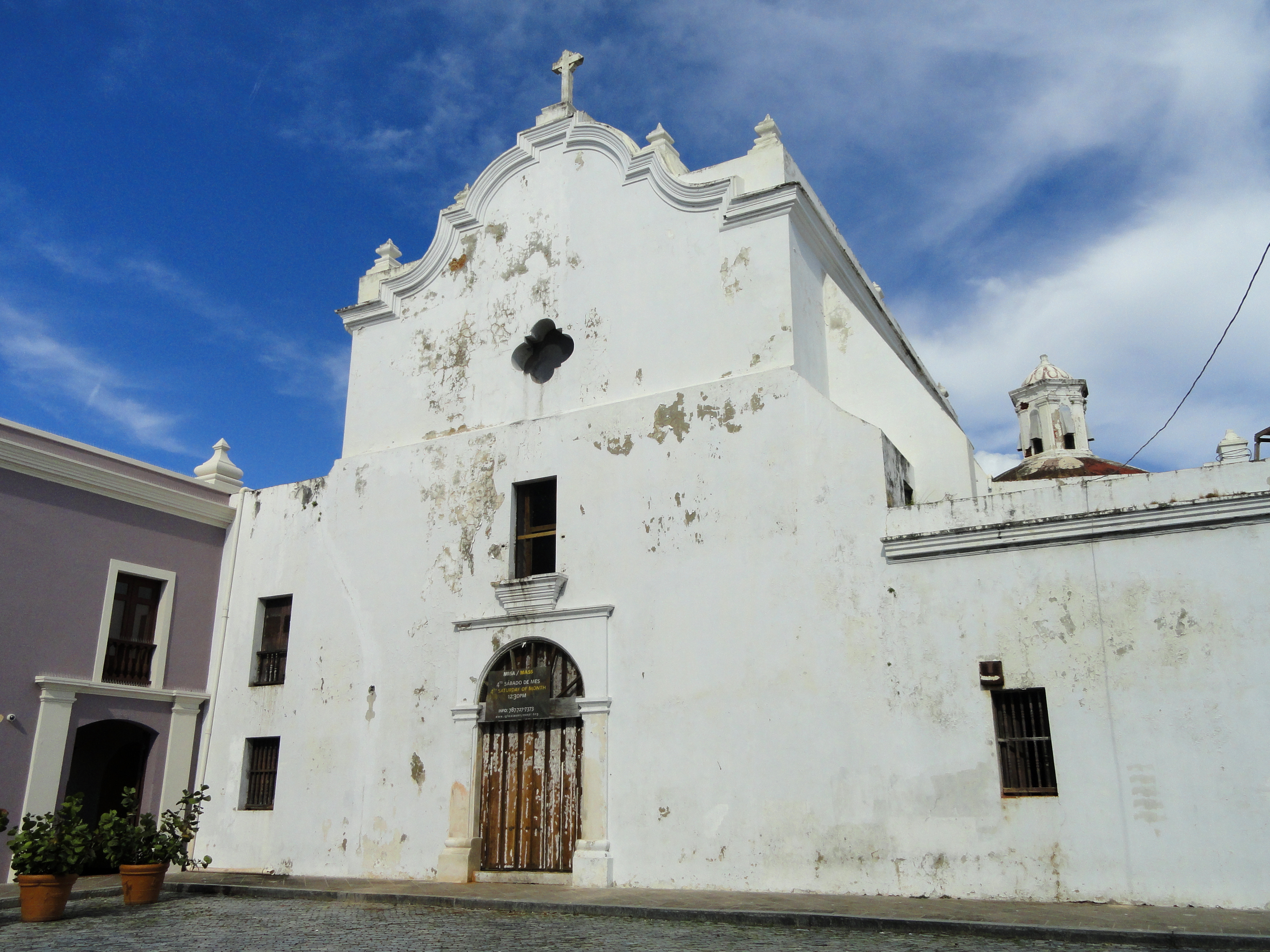
The San Jose Church in Old San Juan, Puerto Rico was included in 2013's list of 11 Most Endangered Historic Places.

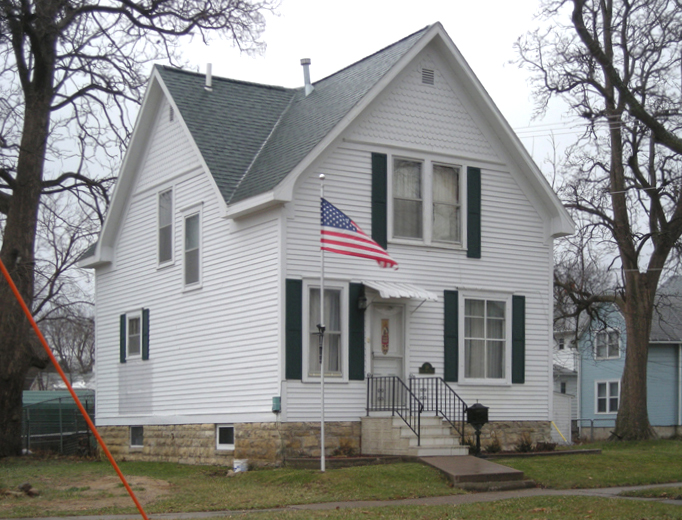
Grant Wood's boyhood home, Cedar Rapids, Iowa, listed as one of the most endangered historic sites in Iowa

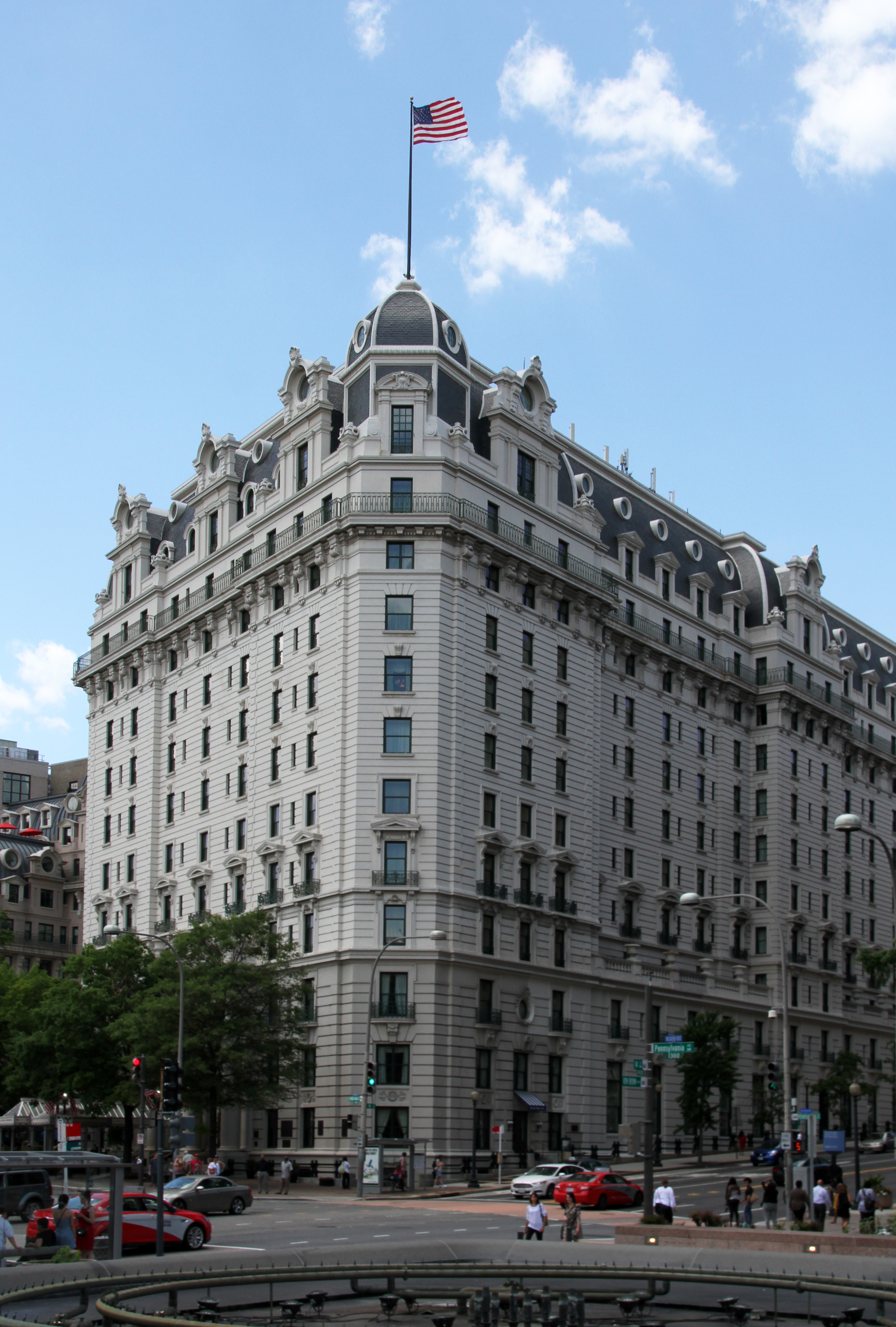
The Willard Hotel in Washington, D.C.

=== America's 11 Most Endangered Historic Places List ===
First published in 1988, the National Trust's list of America's 11 Most Endangered Historic Places is an annual list that highlights endangered historic sites across the United States. The list serves to raise national awareness of these sites. The sites are nominated by the public and eventually selected based on a range of factors, including its significance, whether there is a local group engaged in its preservation, the urgency of the threat, and potential solutions to that threat.

=== African American Cultural Heritage Action Fund ===
In 2017, the Trust launched an initiative called the African American Cultural Heritage Action Fund to identify underrepresented Black cultural sites in need of funding for restoration and preservation. The program has been directed by historian Brent Leggs.

=== Preservation Leadership Forum and resources ===
The National Trust for Historic Preservation organizes the Preservation Leadership Forum, a network of preservation professionals.

=== Historic Hotels of America ===
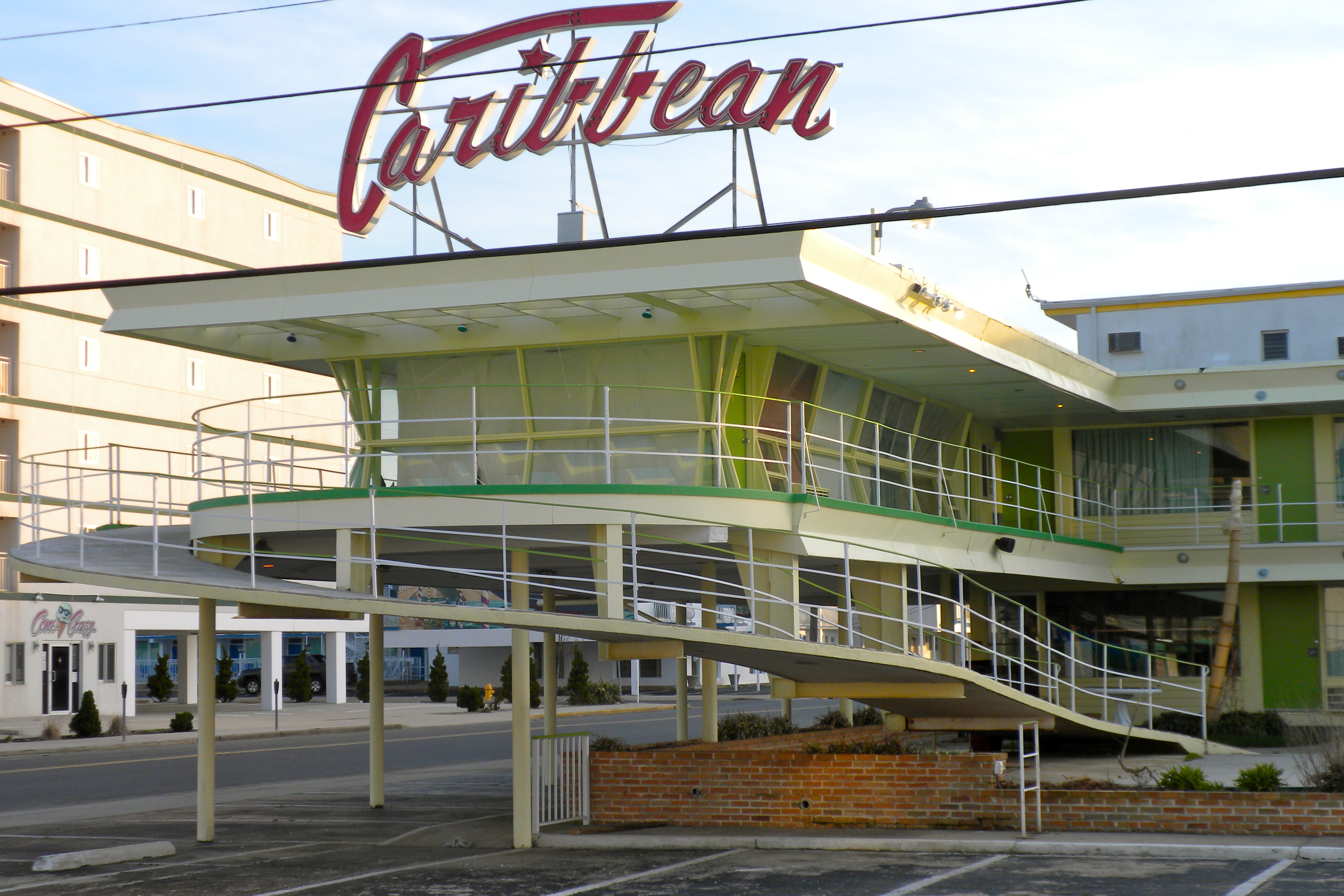
The Caribbean Motel in Wildwood Crest, New Jersey, listed in the National Register of Historic Places

The National Trust for Historic Preservation created Historic Hotels of America in 1989, with 32 charter members. Historic Hotels of America identifies hotels that have maintained their authenticity, sense of place, and architectural integrity. As of June 5, 2015, the program includes over 260 members in 44 states, including the District of Columbia, Puerto Rico, and the U.S. Virgin Islands.

To be included in the program, hotels must be at least 50 years old; designated by the U.S. Secretary of the Interior as a National Historic Landmark or listed in or eligible for listing in the National Register of Historic Places; and recognized as having historic significance.

=== National Treasures ===
Initiated in 2011, the National Treasures program identified historically significant landmarks that face imminent threat. With the support of local preservationists, the National Trust led direct action to save these sites through fundraising, coalition building, and legal advocacy. The sites were selected based on criteria including: integrity, contribution to America's diverse history, and preservation strategies that can be applied to other sites.

The portfolio of National Treasures included, for example:

- Fort Monroe in Hampton, Virginia
- Historic Wintersburg in Huntington Beach, California
- Houston Astrodome in Houston, Texas
- Miami Marine Stadium in Miami, Florida
- The historic Rosenwald Schools built in the early 19th century to educate African-American children.
- South Side Community Art Center

== Advocacy ==
The National Trust's advocacy arm works to effect policy at the local, state, and federal level. Current advocacy priorities are:

=== Historic Tax Credit (HTC) ===
The Historic Tax Credit (HTC) is the federal tax credit program that incentivizes the rehabilitation of historic buildings. The HTC, which has rehabilitated more than 38,700 buildings and leveraged about $106 billion in private investment nationwide, is in danger of being eliminated in current budget-balancing discussions in Congress.

=== Federal transportation legislation ===
The federal Department of Transportation Act of 1966 included Section 4(f), which stipulates that planners must develop projects that protect or avoid historic resources. However, Section 4(f) is periodically challenged through the transportation reauthorization process, most recently during the consideration of MAP-21. Due to work by preservationists, Section 4(f) remains intact.

=== Public lands ===
The National Trust advocates for the preservation of historic and cultural resources on federal public lands, partnering with the Bureau of Land Management, the Forest Service, and the National Park Service. The National Trust supported the Green Mountain Lookout Heritage Protection Act, a bill that would prevent the United States Forest Service from removing a building from the Glacier Peak Wilderness Area in Washington State unless the agency determines that the structure is unsafe for visitors. The National Trust stated that it was "pleased that Congress has acted to protect this historically significant and locally cherished landmark. With this vote, the House joins the Senate in affirming that the preservation of this historic resource is compatible with wilderness protection."

Drayton Hall, Charleston, South Carolina

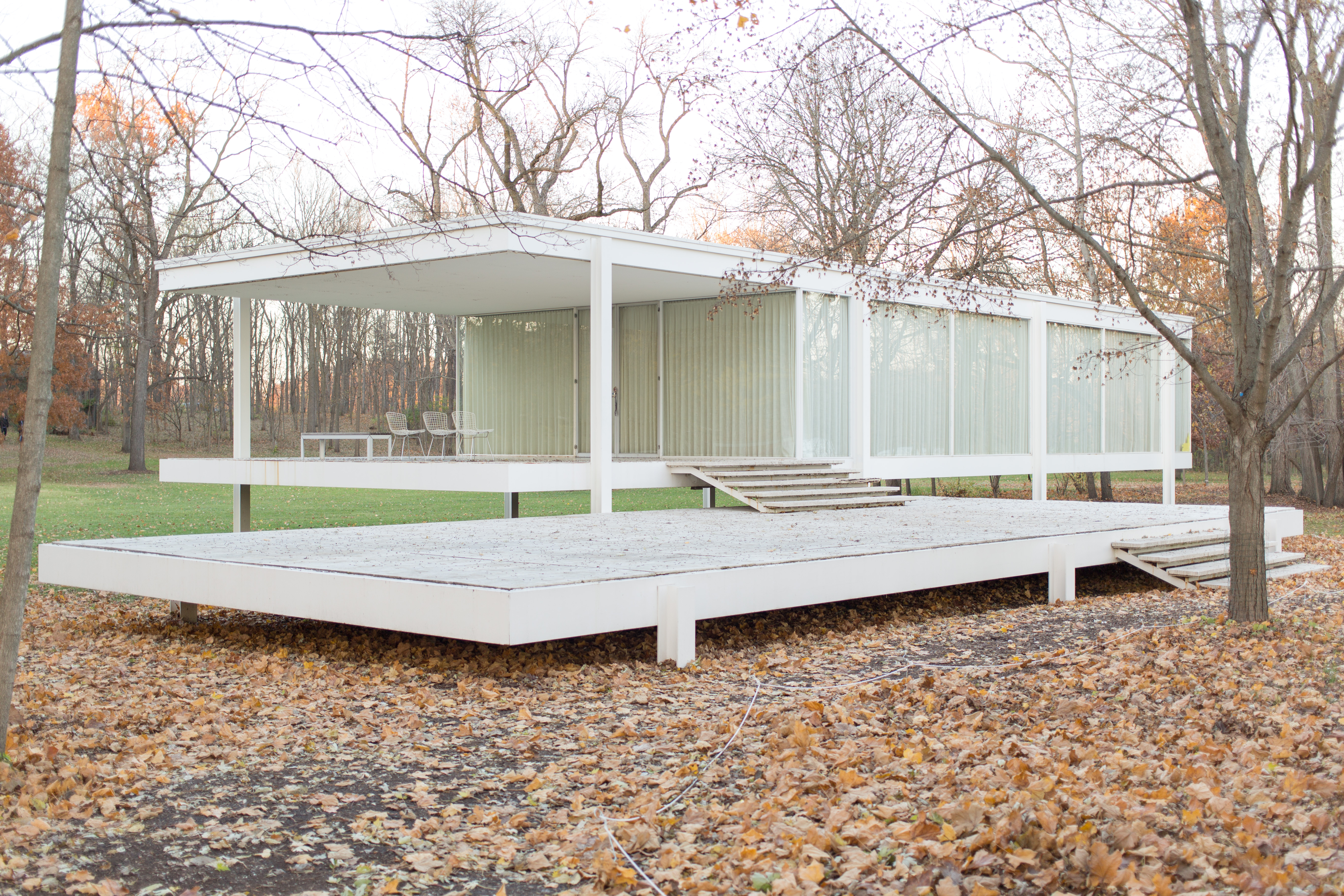
Farnsworth House, Plano, Illinois

== Subsidiaries and affiliated companies ==
=== Subsidiaries ===
- National Main Street Center
- National Trust Community Investment Corporation

=== Affiliated Companies of the National Trust ===
- Historic Hotels of America
- National Trust Insurance Services
- National Trust Tours

== See also ==
- Historic Artists' Homes and Studios
- Historic Hudson Valley
