= Föra Church =

- Föra kyrka
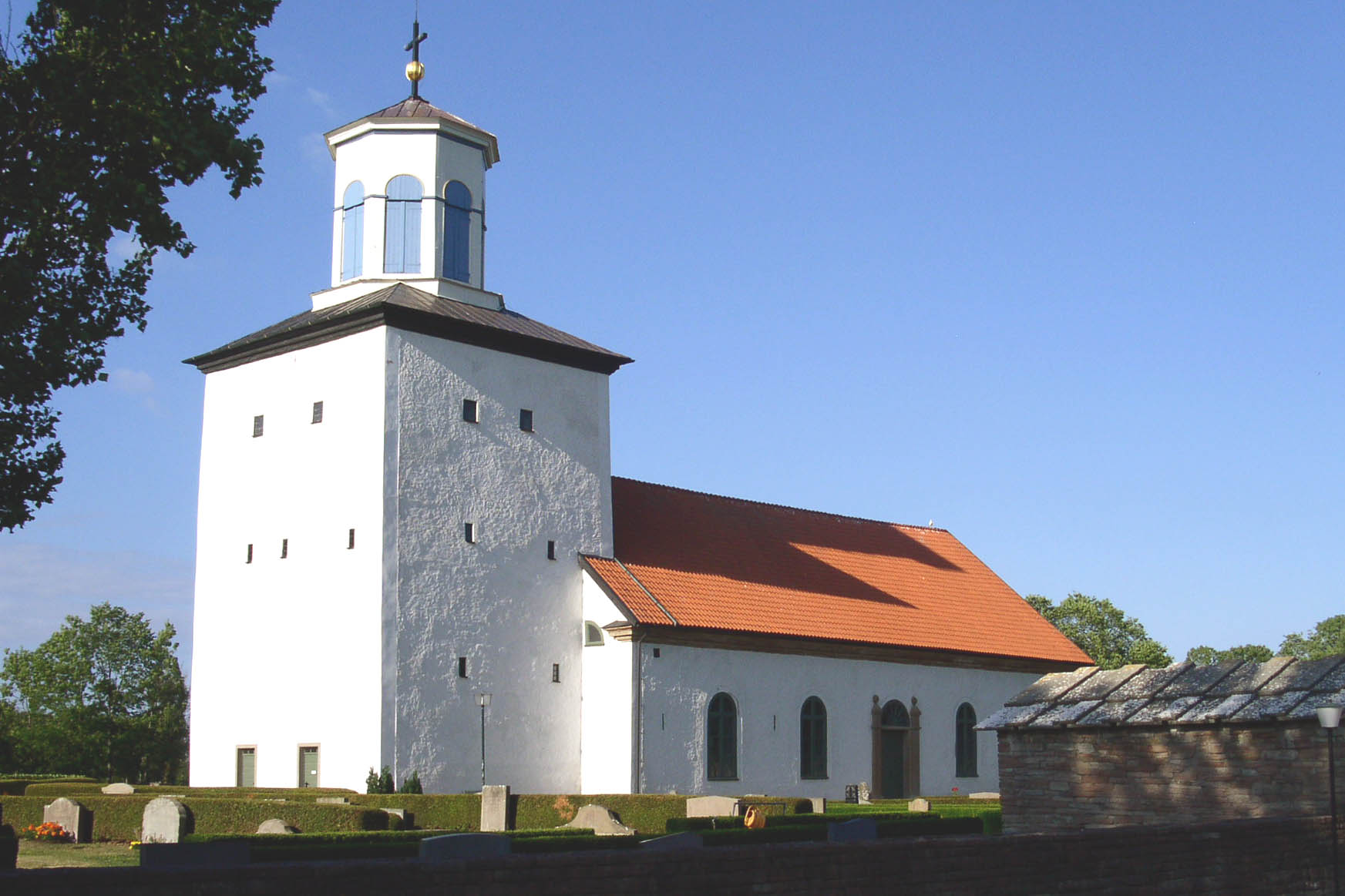
- Föra Church, view of the exterior

- Location within Kalmar
- 57°0′45″N 16°52′01″E
- Country: Sweden
- Denomination: Church of Sweden

Administration
- Diocese: Växjö

Föra Church (Swedish: Föra kyrka) is a Lutheran church on the Swedish island of Öland, in the Baltic Sea. It belongs to the Diocese of Växjö. Dating from the Middle Ages, it was heavily reconstructed during the 19th century.

== History and architecture ==
The first church on this spot was a stave church, built in the 11th century. Traces of the stave church can still be discerned in the church tower. The wooden church was replaced by a stone church during the 1160s, and during the same century it was rebuilt into a fortified church. The church eventually had two towers as well as a fighting platform. Of this medieval church only the tower remains today, however. In 1825 the congregation decided to replace the old church with a new one, and in 1828 the church was demolished. A new, Neoclassical church was added to the still standing western tower. The tower itself was slightly altered and a roof lantern was added to it. The new church was inaugurated in 1837, while its southern portal was added as late as 1863 and carries the monogram of King Charles XV.

Apart from the western tower, the church is Neoclassical in style both inside and outside. The architect was C. Blom-Carlsson. Under the floor of the church, the foundations of the medieval church still exist. The tower is an unusually well-preserved defensive medieval church tower. It still contains vaulted rooms, storage facilities and a privy, which is possibly the oldest privy in Sweden. The tower has probably been used as a shelter both during peace and war, and remains of scraps of food, clothes and tokens for board games have been found there.

Among the church fittings, the dominating altarpiece was made in 1776 by the local artist Anders Georg Wadsten and so is incorporated into the 19th century church from the old church. The church also still contains several medieval items. The baptismal font dates from the 13th century, the altar is from the 12th and made of sandstone from Gotland. There is also a late medieval crucifix and two medieval sculptures, one from the late 14th century and one from c. 1500. The pulpit dates from 1762.
