= Metro Brands =

Indian footwear company

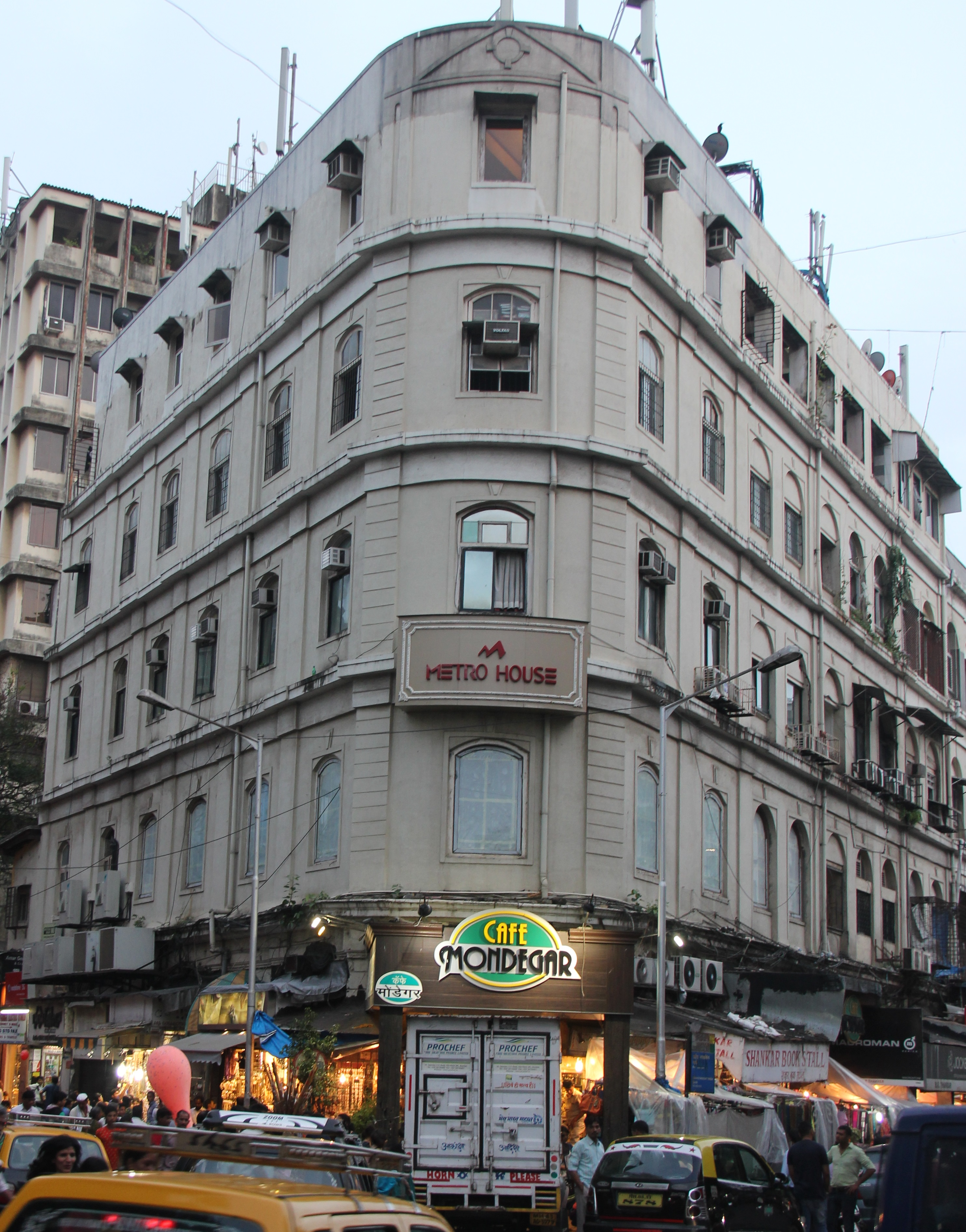
- Metro House building in Colaba, Mumbai, where the first store was opened in 1955
- Type: Public
- Traded as: NSE: METROBRAND; BSE: 543426
- ISIN: INE317I01021
- Industry: Retail
- Founded: 1977; 49 years ago
- Founder: Malik Tejani
- Headquarters: Mumbai, Maharashtra, India
- Area served: India
- Key people: Rafique Malik (Chairman); Farah Malik Bhanji (MD); Nissan Joseph (CEO)
- Products: Footwear; Fashion accessories
- Brands: Metro Shoes; Mochi Shoes; Walkway; FitFlop; DaVinchi; Cheemo
- Revenue: ▲₹2,181 crore (US$230 million) (FY23)
- Net income: ▲₹361 crore (US$37 million) (FY23)
- Website: metrobrands.com

Metro Brands Limited, formerly known as Metro Shoes, is an Indian footwear retailer, headquartered in Mumbai, Maharashtra. As of 2026, the company operates over 1000 stores across 221 cities in India and manages a portfolio of owned brands, including Metro, Mochi, Walkway, DaVinchi, Cheemo, J. Fontini, MetroActiv and Shoe Depot in addition to global partner brands such as Crocs, FitFlop, FILA, New Era, Foot Locker, Clarks, Skechers and Puma.

== History ==
Metro was founded by Malik Tejani in 1955 as a standalone shoe store in Colaba, Mumbai. The company was incorporated in January 1977 as Metro Shoes. The business later expanded under the leadership of Rafique Malik, who serves as Chairman of the company.

== Timeline ==
- 1977 - Metro Shoes (now Metro Brands) was incorporated and introduced the Mochi brand.
- 2000 - Opened the first Mochi Exclusive Brand Outlet.
- 2009 - Introduced the Walkway value footwear format.
- 2010 - Launched e-commerce operations and crossed 100 stores.
- 2015 - Entered into a partnership with Crocs to operate exclusive Crocs stores in India.
- 2021 - Metro Brands launched its initial public offering (IPO) in December 2021, raising ₹1,367.5 crore (US$140 million).
- 2021 - Signed an exclusive partnership with FitFlop.
- 2022 - Secured the exclusive licence for FILA in India.
- 2023 - Entered into a strategic partnership with Foot Locker.
- 2024 - Partnered with New Era.
- 2025 - Launched MetroActiv, a multi-brand athletic and athleisure retail format.
- 2025 - Secured the exclusive partnership for Clarks in India.
- 2026 - Crossed 1,000 stores and ₹3,000 crore in Gross Sales.

== Brands ==
=== Metro Shoes ===
Metro Shoes is Metro Brands' flagship footwear and accessories brand. Established in 1955, it offers footwear, handbags, belts, wallets, and other accessories for men, women, and children.

=== Mochi ===
Mochi is a footwear and accessories brand operated by Metro Brands. The first Mochi-branded store was launched in 2000 and caters to a broad consumer base across casual, formal, and occasion-wear categories.

=== DaVinchi ===
DaVinchi is a premium footwear brand operated by Metro Brands.

The brand offers footwear across multiple categories, including formal shoes, casual footwear, sandals, and occasion wear. DaVinchi's products are primarily crafted from leather and are targeted at consumers seeking premium and occasion-based styles.

=== J. Fontini ===
J Fontini is a premium footwear brand operated by Metro Brands Limited under the Mochi retail portfolio. The brand offers men's footwear across formal, casual, ethnic, and occasion-wear categories. Its product range includes leather shoes, loafers, sandals, and other footwear styles designed for work, social events, and everyday wear.

=== Cheemo ===
Cheemo is an Indian fashion accessories and footwear brand operated by Metro Brands Limited. The brand primarily focuses on women's handbags and footwear, with product offerings across traditional, festive, and occasion-led categories. Cheemo is known for offering handcrafted styles that blend contemporary fashion with ethnic aesthetics.

The brand is distributed through Metro Brands' retail stores and online channels in India.

== Retail Formats ==
=== MetroActiv ===
MetroActiv is a multi-brand sports and performance retail format operated by Metro Brands. It offers footwear, apparel, and accessories across sports and active lifestyle categories.

=== Walkway ===
Walkway is Metro Brands' value footwear retail format, launched in 2009. The brand focuses on affordable footwear and accessories for men, women, and children.

=== Shoe Depot ===
Shoe Depot is a multi-brand Factory Outlet destination operated by Metro Brands Limited. It offers footwear and accessories from a portfolio of brands, including Metro, Mochi, Walkway, Crocs, FitFlop, FILA, and other national and international footwear brands. Shoe Depot stores cater to men, women, and children across multiple footwear categories.

== Partner Brands ==
=== Crocs ===
Crocs is an American footwear brand. Metro Brands Limited operates exclusive Crocs retail stores in India through a partnership with Crocs, Inc. The company manages the brand's retail presence and distribution in the country.

=== FitFlop ===
FitFlop is a UK-based footwear brand founded in 2007 by Marcia Kilgore. The brand specializes in comfort footwear and biomechanically engineered technology designed to support natural movement and all-day wear. FitFlop products are sold in more than 60 countries worldwide.

Metro Brands Limited holds the exclusive rights to retail, market, and distribute FitFlop products in India.

=== FILA ===
FILA is a global sportswear and lifestyle brand offering footwear, apparel, and accessories. Metro Brands Limited holds the exclusive licence for FILA in India and manages the brand's operations across footwear, apparel, and accessories in the country.

=== Foot Locker ===
Foot Locker is an American sportswear and footwear retailer. In 2023, Metro Brands Limited entered into a partnership with Foot Locker to introduce and expand the Foot Locker retail format in India. The partnership marked Foot Locker's entry into the Indian market.

=== New Era ===
New Era is an American headwear and apparel brand. Metro Brands Limited partnered with New Era Cap Company to expand the brand's retail presence in India through its store network and distribution channels.

=== Clarks ===
Clarks is a footwear brand founded in 1825 in Somerset, England, by brothers Cyrus and James Clark. The company is one of the world's oldest footwear manufacturers and combines traditional shoemaking craftsmanship with comfort-focused design.

In 2025, Clarks entered into a partnership with Metro Brands Limited, appointing Metro Brands as its exclusive retail and digital partner for India. Under the agreement, Metro Brands manages the brand's retail and e-commerce operations in the country, including Clarks' exclusive stores and official digital channels.
