= Forum The Shopping Mall =

Shopping center in Orchard Road, Singapore

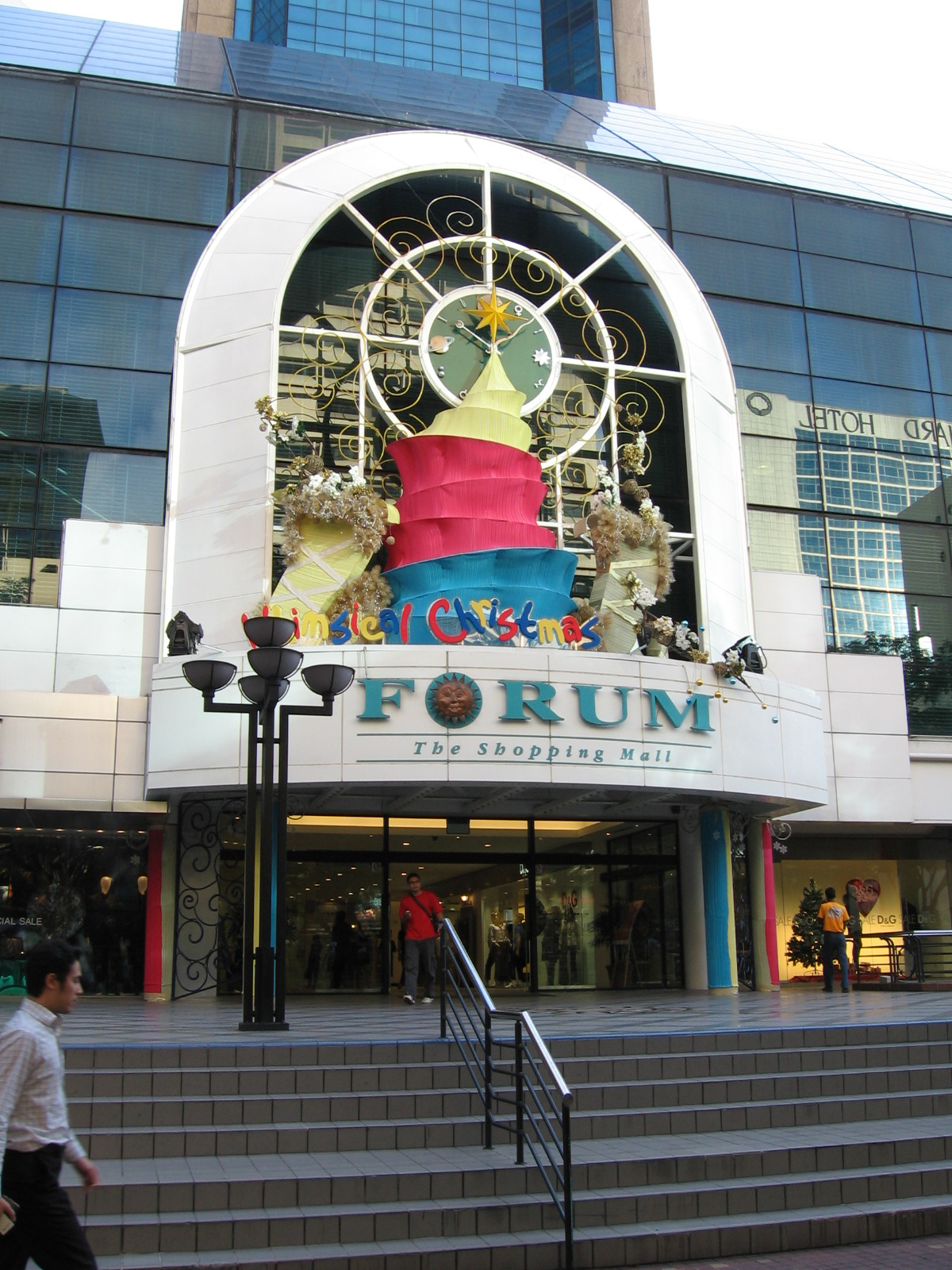
- Location: Orchard Road, Singapore
- Coordinates: 1°18′22.5″N 103°49′43″E
- Address: 583 Orchard Road
- Opened: 1986
- Owner: Hotel Properties Limited
- Num. of stores: 72
- Num. of anchor tenants: 2
- Floor area: 260,000 square feet (24,000 m^{2})
- Floors: 5
- Website: forumtheshoppingmall.com.sg

Forum The Shopping Mall (Chinese: 福临购物中心, Tamil: பாரம் அங்காடி ) is a shopping mall on Singapore's main shopping belt, Orchard Road. It was built on the site of the Singapura Forum Hotel. It is owned by Hotel Properties Limited (HPL).

Located along the upper stretch of Orchard Road and a five-minute walk from Orchard MRT station, the mall is anchored by Toys "R" Us and Julia Gabriel Centre.

== History ==
In 2023, its parent company, HPL, obtained approval from Urban Redevelopment Authority to redevelop Forum The Shopping Mall, voco Orchard Singapore and HPL House into a mixed-use redevelopment.

== See also ==
- List of shopping malls in Singapore
