= Fawru =

Fawru فورة
- Village
- Location in Syria
- Coordinates: 35°42′44″N 36°16′51″E
- Country: Syria
- Governorate: Hama
- District: Suqaylabiyah
- Subdistrict: Ziyarah

Population (2004)
  - Total: 475
- Time zone: UTC+3 (AST)
- City Qrya Pcode: C3172

Fawru (Arabic: فورة) is a village in Syria located in the Subdistrict of the al-Suqaylabiyah District in the Hama Governorate. According to the Syria Central Bureau of Statistics (CBS), Fawru had a population of 475 in the 2004 census. Its inhabitants are predominantly Alawites.

== Syrian Civil War ==
On 11 October 2015, at least ten Syrian Army soldiers were killed in a confrontation with Jaysh al-Fatah in the village.
