= Forum (Macedonian magazine) =

Forum Форум
- Company type: Private
- Industry: Journalism
- Founded: 1997
- Headquarters: Skopje, Republic of Macedonia (now North Macedonia)
- Key people: Bojan Nedelkovski(Manager)
- Website: www.forum.com.mk

Forum is one of the oldest weekly political magazines in the Republic of Macedonia. It has been in publication since 1997.

== Background ==
In 2007, Forum joined the Seavus Group. Even though Forum is recognized as political magazine, but still, other fields like economy, culture, and life, cover significant part of the magazine pages. The world stories are also fully covered by the correspondents in Moscow and Washington, and the busy stringers in the neighboring countries. To keep the pace with global trends, Forum added two new media -a portal and English-language monthly magazine Free Time Guide Macedonia.

The portal offers the same quality of contents as the magazine, with persistent rise in visits thanks to freshness, stridency and originality. It follows global standards and highest trends. Free Time Guide Macedonia is a monthly magazine in English, focusing on Macedonia's fortune, its beauties, traditions and people. Its utmost objective is to present the beauties of Macedonia and to show the cheerfulness of its soul, and also to offer something new and extraordinary to every foreigner in the Republic of Macedonia. Forum ceased to exist in 2011.
