= Fira OS =

Operating System

- Developer: Android Open Source Project (AOSP) code: Google; Modifications: Fira (subsidiary of Polytron)
- Written in: C (core), C++, Java (UI)
- OS family: Unix-like, Linux
- Source model: Proprietary software based on open source Android and in all devices with proprietary components
- Initial release: 2016
- Latest release: Fira OS 1.0 / January 28, 2016; 10 years ago
- Marketing target: Smartphones
- Package manager: APK
- Supported platforms: 32-bit and 64-bit ARM
- Kernel type: Monolithic (modified Linux kernel)
- Userland: Bionic libc, mksh shell, native core utilities with a few from NetBSD
- Default user interface: Graphical (Multi-touch)
- License: Proprietary EULA; based on Apache License 2.0; Modified Linux kernel under GNU GPL v2
- Official website: fira.id

Fira OS is a Linux-based mobile operating system and software platform developed by Fira, a subsidiary of Indonesian electronic giant Polytron (member of Djarum Group). Introduced on January 28, 2016, it was forked from Android and installed on newer Polytron smartphones since 2016.

== Overview ==
Fira OS is based on the Android Open Source Project (AOSP) and the Linux kernel. It was built to comply with an Indonesian regulation requiring 40% minimum local content on all 4G LTE smartphones sold in Indonesia starting in 2017.

== Applications ==
Fira OS features applications that are not usually available in other AOSP-based operating systems, such as FIRA Check Pulsa, FIRA Store, FIRA Pay, FIRA Directory, and others.
