= The Forum (Chicago) =

- U.S. National Register of Historic Places
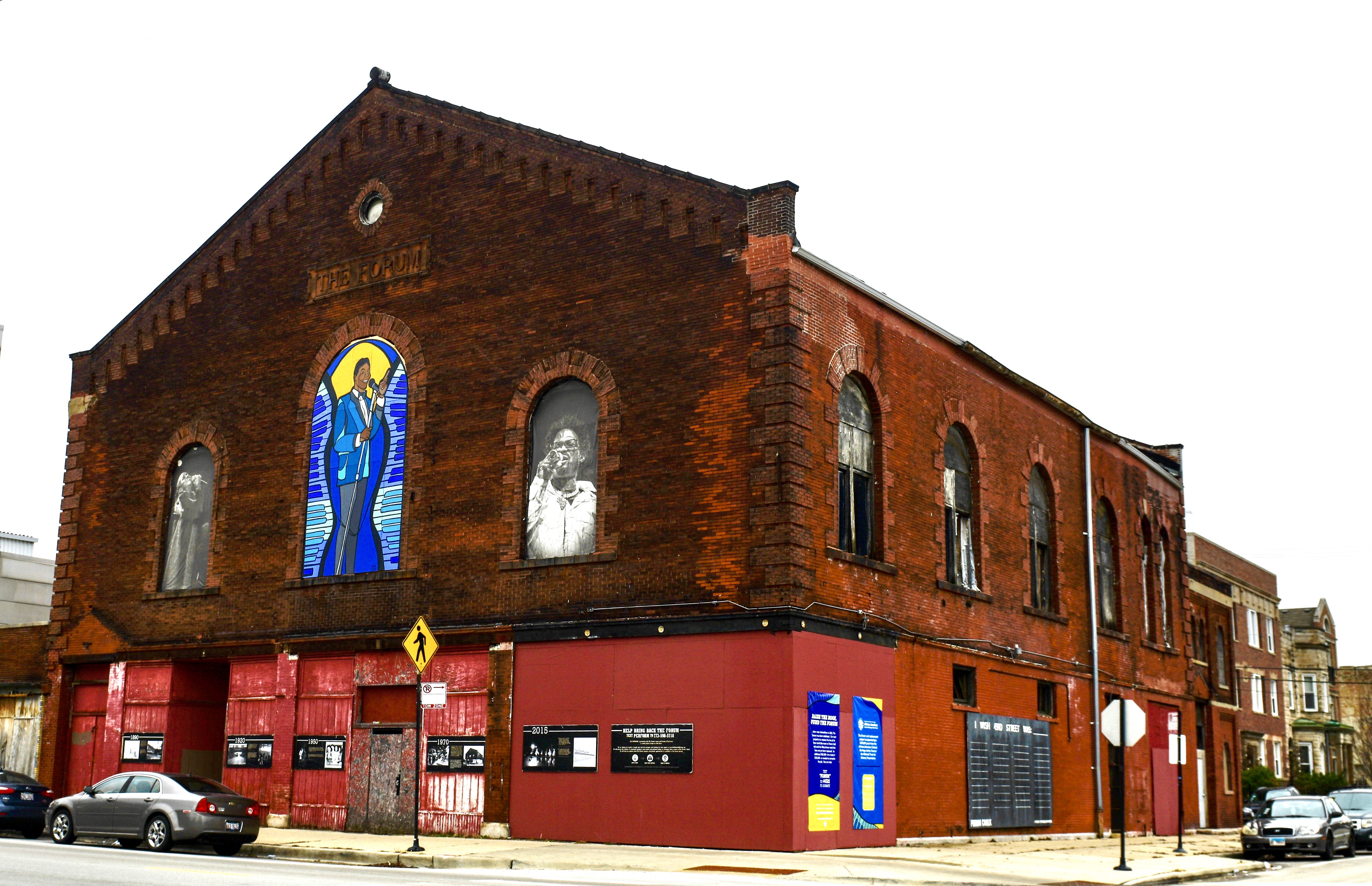

- Location within Chicago metropolitan area Location within Illinois Location within the United States
- Location: 318-328 E. 43rd St. Chicago, Illinois
- Coordinates: 41°49′00″N 87°37′07″W
- Built: 1897
- Architect: Samuel Atwater Treat
- Architectural style: Late Classical Revival
- NRHP reference No.: 100003646
- Added to NRHP: April 16, 2019

The Forum is a historic event venue at 318-328 E. 43rd Street in the Bronzeville neighborhood of the Grand Boulevard community area of Chicago, Illinois. Chicago alderman William Kent and his father Albert had the venue built in 1897, intending it to be a social and political meeting hall. Architect Samuel Atwater Treat gave the building a Late Classical Revival design with Georgian Revival features. In its first decades, the Forum hosted speeches and rallies from politicians of all major parties and various community events.

Following the Great Migration of the 1920s, Bronzeville became a predominantly African-American neighborhood, but the Forum continued to serve as a community center. Several civil rights organizations met in the Forum, including the National Negro Congress' Chicago council; the Chicago Scottsboro Defense Conference, a group organized to defend the Scottsboro Boys; movements that petitioned to racially integrate Major League Baseball; and a meeting of the Freedom Riders. The Forum was also a major jazz venue, and Chicago musicians such as Nat King Cole and Tiny Parham played the venue often. In the 1940s, the building became the headquarters of the Improved Benevolent and Protective Order of Elks of the World, a black fraternal organization formed in response to the white-only Benevolent and Protective Order of Elks.

In 2011, the Forum was purchased by Bernard Loyd, who is in the process of restoring it as a retail space and venue. An adjoining coffeehouse, called the Forum Cafe, is currently being developed.

Starting in 2015, the building has been an annual feature in Open House Chicago. The Forum was added to the National Register of Historic Places on April 16, 2019.
