= Forum Group =

Forum Group Pty Ltd
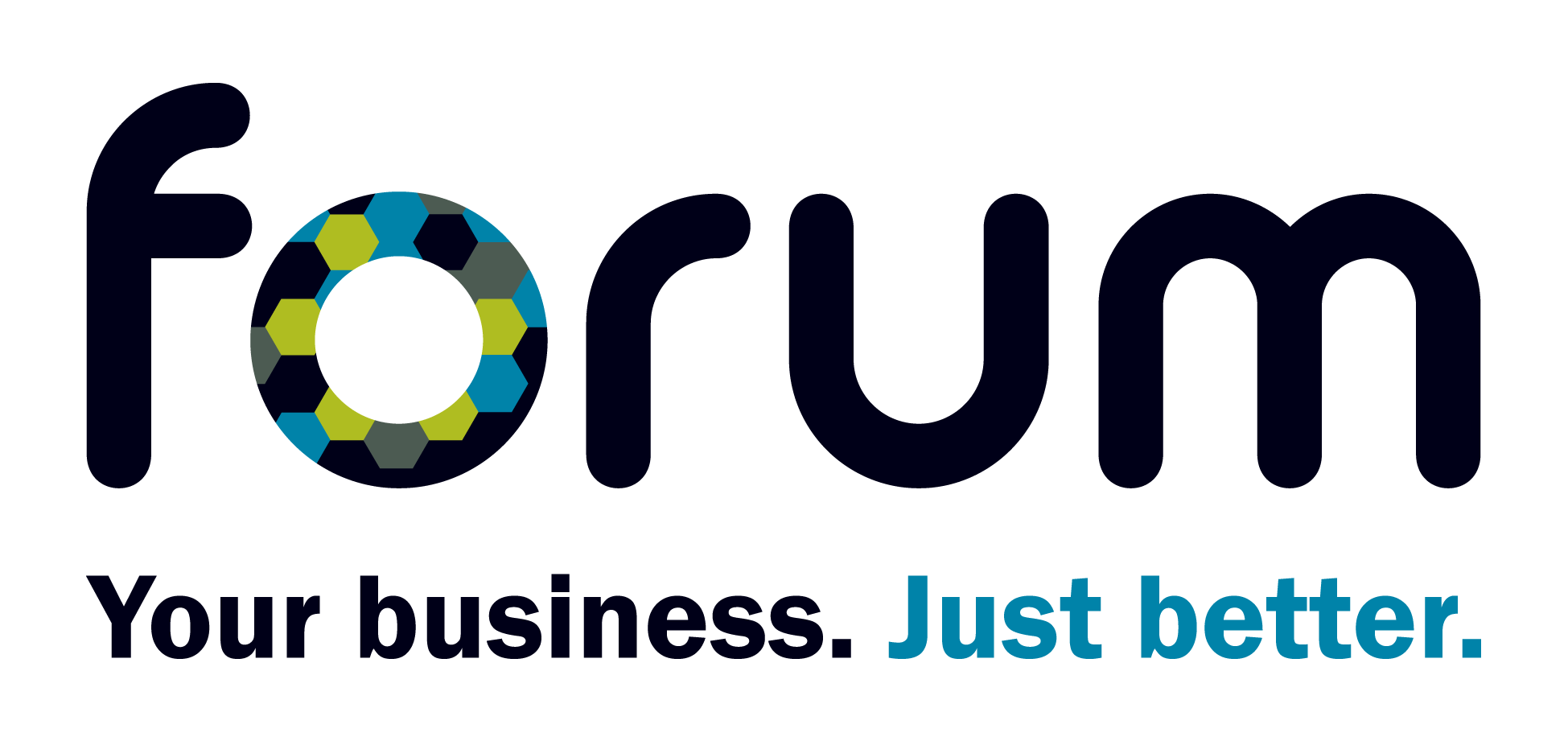
- Type: Privately held company
- Industry: Business Services; Information Technology and Solutions
- Founded: 2011
- Founder: Basile Papadimitriou (a.k.a. Bill Papas)
- Headquarters: North Sydney, New South Wales, Australia
- Number of locations: Offices Sydney/Melbourne/Brisbane/Perth/Gold Coast; 50+ regional dealers
- Area served: Australia and New Zealand
- Key people: Executive Chairman & CEO: Bill Papas
- Products: Workflow Automation, Managed IT and Cloud Services, Managed Print Services, Fleet Management and GPS Asset Tracking Solutions
- Number of employees: 100 appx ~ since July 2021
- Website: www.forumgroup.com.au

Forum Group was an Australian managed services provider offering integrated B2B solutions, including IT, print, environment, fleet and security. Founded in 2011, the business was later described as a front for a $400m fraud. The company was liquidated after its founder, Bill Papas, fled to Greece.

== History ==
Founded in 2011 in St Leonards, New South Wales, the business soon became the most elaborate front for a $400m fraud that competes with that of Christopher Skase. Bill Papas who goes by several names, including Basile Papadimitriou, has 10 cars worth in excess of $5 million, 20 plus properties valued at $40 million has successfully funneled Westpac banks money with the help of his confidants all over the world particularly to Greece where he is hiding with his girlfriend Louise Agostino. Forum had been on the BRW Fast Starters for consecutive years and its British subsidiary powerPerfector in the similar business lists. Forum had offices in all mainland Australian capital cities, and was the provider of TomTom in Oceania, being a $60 million per year revenue business. Thanks to Papas the business has now been liquidated, over 50% of the staff have been terminated and have not received their entitlements while he is seen drinking cocktails in his luxury abode on the Mediterranean.

== Customers ==
Forum had over 4,500 customers including Metcash, Boston Scientific, Tower of London and Australian Rugby Union. Forum's Enviro services which include fuel and energy reduction, solar panels and waste compounders have been utilised by local councils and Adelaide Town Hall, malls, museums, Westminster Abbey, stadiums and hospitals in Australia as well as in Europe and East Asia too.

== Fraud and downfall ==
As of 8 July 2021, Forum Group has had administrators appointed, as a result of a $300-$400 million financial scam against Westpac and other banks with forged documents and fraudulent transactions with a subsidiary, Forum Finance. Forum Group was subsequently bought by Our Kloud on 22 July 2021, the sole owner being a cousin of Bill Papas (real name Basile Papadimitriou, who had fled to Greece).

On 30 July 2021 in a federal court hearing, Bill Papas was accused of telling lies in his statement to the court. Bill also claimed to not have enough money to fly to Sydney to answer the allegation in the court.

In Bill Papas affidavits that were finally submitted to the Australian courts in early August 2021, Bill claims to be suffering from "Extreme Anxiety" as a result of being involved with the $400M+ scam which is one of the reasons why he has been unable to return to Australia.

In September 2021 it was claimed that Craig Rollinson, a Forum Group Executive was aware of the fraud conducted by Bill Papas as early as 2018 and had failed to take any action with the whistleblower. Further it was claimed that in June/July 2021, presumably just before the collapse of the business, Rollinson had contacted Papas and asked for him to pay for the renovations to his investment property in lieu of bonuses.

On 21 October 2021, the Federal Court of Australia issued an arrest warrant for Papas, deeming that he had displayed no genuine effort to return to Australia.

In late 2021, Bills Cousin, Eric Constantinidis was challenged about payments he received from Forum at the time of its administration. It appears these funds were used to pay for Bill Papas legal fees.

In January 2022, Justice Michael Lee issued freezing orders on property owned by Louisa (“Louise”) Agostino. It was claimed she sold her apartment in Rozelle, Sydney for $1.1 million and these funds would now be frozen. Further, recently Papas in a meeting with the Greek sporting authorities claimed he still owns Xanthi football club. Earlier he had told the Federal Court of Australia that he did not own Xanthi.
