= Ayn al-Kurum =

Village in Syria

Ayn al-Kurum عين الكروم
- Village
- Location in Syria
- Coordinates: 35°22′28″N 36°15′46″E
- Country: Syria
- Governorate: Hama
- District: Suqaylabiyah
- Subdistrict: Suqaylabiyah

Population (2017)
  - Total: 22,000
- Time zone: UTC+3 (AST)
- City Qrya Pcode: C3123

Ayn al-Kurum (Arabic: عين الكروم) is a village in northwestern Syria, administratively part of the al-Suqaylabiyah District of the Hama Governorate. The name of the village translates in Arabic as 'spring of the vineyards', which the residents attribute to its abundant springs and vineyards. It is surrounded by forests and straddles a steep ridge of the Syrian Coastal Mountain Range and the Ghab Plain below it.

The village is frequently mentioned in Ottoman government records as home or host to Alawite rebels and brigands in the 18th and 19th centuries. During this period, Christians from Ayn al-Kurum founded the modern town of al-Suqaylabiyah. Today, it remains a mainly agricultural village and is the center of a municipality incorporating several surrounding villages. Its inhabitants are predominantly Alawites.

== Geography ==
Ayn al-Kurum is about 60 kilometers (37 mi) northwest of the governorate capital of Hama. It lies on the eastern slopes of the Syrian Coastal Mountains and the Ghab Plain below. The decline which the village straddles is steep, with the plain having an elevation of 200 meters (660 ft) above sea level and the mountains above standing around 1,250 meters (4,100 ft). The village is surrounded by forests of evergreen laurel, oak, fir, terebinth and doum trees and dense vegetation, including olive groves and crop fields.

== History ==
=== Ottoman period ===
In 1733 or 1734, Ayn al-Kurum, along with neighboring Annab, became a refuge for the Shillif brothers Hassun and Ahmad (sons of Muhammad Ibn Shillif). The Shillifs were a prominent family of Alawites known in the Ottoman government sources and Alawite oral tradition for their brigandage in the Syrian coastal mountains and adjacent plains. The brothers had gained safe haven in Ayn al-Kurum from their pursuit by the Ottoman governor of Latakia, who was attempting to suppress a rebellion they were leading among the local Alawites and Christians in the sanjak (district).

About ten years later, an Ottoman firman alleged that some 3,000 Alawite villagers from Ayn al-Kurum, Deir Mama, Annab and elsewhere in the vicinity had raided the coastal fortress of al-Marqab and over two dozen villages, burning several homes, trespassing the mosque at Marqab and seizing livestock. The governor of Tripoli Eyalet was ordered to capture the perpetrators and return the stolen goods, but instead his deputy rallied the people of Marqab and rampaged through the Alawite country up to the castle of Qal'at al-Mudiq in the Ghab Plain.

In the late 18th century, Christian families from the Hauran in southern Syria relocated to Ayn al-Kurum to escape persecution by the authorities. In the mid-19th century, these families and other Christians from Ayn al-Kurum and nearby villages emigrated and founded a new village on a tell (mound) across the Ghab plain from Ayn al-Kurum, which became the modern town of al-Suqaylabiyah.

In 1858, one of the most prominent Alawite leaders of the 19th century and the governor of Safita, Isma'il Khair Bey, took up refuge in Ayn al-Kurum under the protection of its leader, his maternal uncle Ali al-Shilli, of the Rashawneh clan of the Kalbiyya tribe. Al-Shili was considered an outlaw and wanted by the Ottomans, who assaulted Ayn al-Kurum in pursuit of Isma'il. The Ottomans, aware al-Shilli's fortified house would be difficult to capture, threatened al-Shili with the village's destruction unless he handed over Isma'il. In response, al-Shili negotiated a pardon for himself and his companions and appointment to the governorship of Safita if he turned over Isma'il. As per their agreement, the Ottomans besieged al-Shilli's house and al-Shilli killed and beheaded Isma'il Bey, and also killed his sons who were present with him.

In March 1892, the governor of Syria Vilayet dispatched a military expedition to subdue Ayn al-Kurum, then part of a kaza (district) called 'Hamidiye', for hosting a well-known group of highwaymen from the mountains near Latakia. The frequent lawlessness centered in and around Ayn al-Kurum drove the Ottoman interior minister to propose the village become the administrative center of its own kaza with authority over thirteen surrounding villages and its own budget.

=== Post-Syrian independence ===
Ayn al-Kurum became a municipality, incorporating the neighboring villages of Annab, Abr Beit Seif, Saqiyat Najm, and Tahunat al-Halawa. The total population of the municipality in 2017 was about 22,000. A government decree, No. 209, made Ayn al-Kurum the center of its own nahiya (subdisrict), but the decision had not been implemented as of March 2017. The main economic activity in the village is agriculture, particularly the cultivation of cotton, sugarbeets, potatoes, sunflowers, wheat, and more recently on the mountainside of Ayn al-Kurum, olives, particularly two types called 'Qaysi' and 'Surani'. Most households own livestock. Some of the villagers are traders or engaged in cottage industries, like cheesemaking and dried fruits and vegetables, particularly figs, okra, mulukhiya, and raisins.

== Bibliography ==
- Comité de l'Asie française (April 1933). "Notes sur la propriété foncière dans le Syrie centrale (Notes on Landownership in Central Syria)". Bulletin du Comité de l'Asie française (in French). 33 (309). Comité de l'Asie française: 131–137.
- Talhami, Yvette (November 2008). "The Nusayri Leader Isma'il Khayr Bey and the Ottomans (1854–58)". Middle Eastern Studies. 44 (6): 895–908. doi:10.1080/00263200802426013. JSTOR 40262627.
- Winter, Stefan (2016). A History of the 'Alawis: From Medieval Aleppo to the Turkish Republic. Princeton and Oxford: Princeton University Press. ISBN 9780691167787.
