= Nabe al-Tayeb =

Nabe al-Tayeb نبع الطيب
- Village
- Location in Syria
- Coordinates: 35°24′15″N 36°14′47″E
- Country: Syria
- Governorate: Hama
- District: Suqaylabiyah
- Subdistrict: Suqaylabiyah

Population (2004)
  - Total: 1,521
- Time zone: UTC+3 (AST)
- City Qrya Pcode: C3131

Nabe al-Tayeb (Arabic: نبع الطيب) is a village in central Syria, administratively part of the al-Suqaylabiyah District of the Hama. According to the Syria Central Bureau of Statistics (CBS), Nabe al-Tayeb had a population of 1,521 in the 2004 census. It was administratively merged with the neighboring village of Annab and the merged village was later incorporated into the municipality of Ayn al-Kurum.

== Demographics ==
Its population was 1,521 according to the 2004 census conducted by the Syrian Central Bureau of Statistics, and the majority of its inhabitants are Alawites.

== Notable people ==
- Amjad Youssef: a war criminal known for his main role in Tadamon massacre, Damascus on 16 April 2013 during Syrian revolution. Arrested by Syrian security forces at his house in Nabe al-Tayeb on 24 April 2026.
