= Al-Aziziyah, al-Suqaylabiyah =

Al-Aziziyah العزيزية
- Village
- Location in Syria
- Coordinates: 35°31′14″N 36°19′24″E
- Country: Syria
- Governorate: Hama
- District: Suqaylabiyah
- Subdistrict: Qalaat al-Madiq

Population (2004)
  - Total: 1,828
- Time zone: UTC+3 (AST)
- City Qrya Pcode: C3189

Al-Aziziyah (Arabic: العزيزية) is a village in northern Syria located in the Qalaat al-Madiq Subdistrict of the al-Suqaylabiyah District in Hama Governorate. According to the Syria Central Bureau of Statistics (CBS), al-Aziziyah had a population of 1,828 in the 2004 census. Its inhabitants are predominantly Alawites.

== Syrian Civil War ==
Since the fall of the previous Syrian government, the civilians of Al-Aziziyah have continuously been attacked by the population of the neighbouring Sunni village of Qabr Fidda in coordination with the General Security Service. On 17 March 2025, during the mass killings of Alawite civilians by the new Syrian Transitional Government, three civilians were shot dead after gunmen stormed the village. As a result of forced displacement of most of its population, only around 15% of the village's residents remain.
