= Oweina =

Oweina عوينة
- Village
- Location in Syria
- Coordinates: 35.3178°N 36.4339°E
- Country: Syria
- Governorate: Hama
- District: Al-Suqaylabiyah District
- Subdistrict: Al-Suqaylabiyah Nahiyah

Population (2004)
  - Total: 1,832
- Time zone: UTC+3 (AST)
- City Qrya Pcode: C3127

Oweina (Arabic: عوينة) is a Syrian village located in Al-Suqaylabiyah Nahiyah in Al-Suqaylabiyah District, Hama. According to the Syria Central Bureau of Statistics (CBS), Oweina had a population of 1,832 in the 2004 census.
