= Al-Huwayz al-Shamali =

Huweiz Elshmali الحويز الشمالي
- Village
- Country: Syria
- Governorate: Hama
- District: Al-Suqaylabiyah District
- Subdistrict: Qalaat al-Madiq

Population (2004)
  - Total: 771
- Time zone: UTC+3 (AST)
- City Qrya Pcode: C3194

Huweiz Elshmali (Arabic: الحويز الشمالي) is a Syrian village located in Qalaat al-Madiq Subdistrict in Al-Suqaylabiyah District, Hama. According to the Syria Central Bureau of Statistics (CBS), Huweiz Elshmali had a population of 771 in the 2004 census.
