= Al-Zitiyah =

Elzitia الزيتية
- Village
- Country: Syria
- Governorate: Hama
- District: Al-Suqaylabiyah District
- Subdistrict: Qalaat al-Madiq

Population (2004)
  - Total: 305
- Time zone: UTC+3 (AST)
- City Qrya Pcode: N/A

Elzitia (Arabic: الزيتية) is a Syrian village located in Qalaat al-Madiq Subdistrict in Al-Suqaylabiyah District, Hama. According to the Syria Central Bureau of Statistics (CBS), Elzitia had a population of 305 in the 2004 census.
