= Al-Hurriyah, Syria =

Al-Hurriyah الحرية
- Village
- Location in Syria
- Coordinates: 35°30′0″N 36°21′19″E
- Country: Syria
- Governorate: Hama
- District: Suqaylabiyah
- Subdistrict: Qalaat al-Madiq

Population (2004)
  - Total: 2,525
- Time zone: UTC+3 (AST)
- City Qrya Pcode: C3198

Al-Hurriyah (Arabic: الحرية) is a village in northern Syria located in the Qalaat al-Madiq Subdistrict of the al-Suqaylabiyah District in Hama Governorate. According to the Syria Central Bureau of Statistics (CBS), al-Hurriyah had a population of 2,525 in the 2004 census. Its inhabitants are predominantly Sunni Muslims.
