= Ojt Eltoba =

Ojt Eltoba عوجة التوبة
- Village
- Country: Syria
- Governorate: Hama
- District: Al-Suqaylabiyah District
- Subdistrict: Qalaat al-Madiq

Population (2004)
  - Total: 540
- Time zone: UTC+3 (AST)
- City Qrya Pcode: N/A

Ojt Eltoba (Arabic: عوجة التوبة) is a Syrian village located in Qalaat al-Madiq Subdistrict in Al-Suqaylabiyah District, Hama. According to the Syria Central Bureau of Statistics (CBS), Ojt Eltoba had a population of 540 in the 2004 census.
