= Bab al-Taqa =

Bab Eltaqa باب الطاقة
- Village
- Location in Syria
- Coordinates: 35.448588°N 36.383436°E
- Country: Syria
- Governorate: Hama
- District: Al-Suqaylabiyah District
- Subdistrict: Qalaat al-Madiq

Population (2004)
  - Total: 1,000
- Time zone: UTC+3 (AST)
- City Qrya Pcode: C3199

Bab Eltaqa (Arabic: باب الطاقة) is a Syrian village located in Qalaat al-Madiq Subdistrict in Al-Suqaylabiyah District, Hama. According to the Syria Central Bureau of Statistics (CBS), Bab Eltaqa had a population of 1000 in the 2004 census.
