= Al-Karim, Syria =

Al-Karim الكريم
- Village
- Location in Syria
- Coordinates: 35°26′17″N 36°19′45″E
- Country: Syria
- Governorate: Hama
- District: Suqaylabiyah
- Subdistrict: Qalaat al-Madiq

Population (2004)
  - Total: 2,879
- Time zone: UTC+3 (AST)
- City Qrya Pcode: C3186

Al-Karim (Arabic: الكريم) is a village in northern Syria located in the Qalaat al-Madiq Subdistrict of the al-Suqaylabiyah District in Hama Governorate. According to the Syria Central Bureau of Statistics (CBS), al-Karim had a population of 2,879 in the 2004 census. Its inhabitants are predominantly Alawites.
