= Hawijah Fauqa =

Hawijah Fauqa حويجة فوقا Hawijah
- Village
- Location in Syria
- Coordinates: 35°31′27″N 36°22′26″E
- Country: Syria
- Governorate: Hama
- District: Suqaylabiyah
- Subdistrict: Qalaat al-Madiq

Population (2004)
  - Total: 2,428
- Time zone: UTC+3 (AST)
- City Qrya Pcode: C3196

Hawijah Fauqa (Arabic: حويجة فوقا, also known as Hawijah) is a village in northern Syria located in the Qalaat al-Madiq Subdistrict of the al-Suqaylabiyah District in Hama Governorate. According to the Syria Central Bureau of Statistics (CBS), Hawijah Fauqa had a population of 2,428 in the 2004 census. Its inhabitants are predominantly Sunni Muslims.

Prior to the Syrian Civil War which broke out in 2011–12, Hawijah's inhabitants derived most of their income from agriculture, particularly from tobacco and cotton. It was among the first towns in the Hama Governorate to hold anti-government demonstrations in 2011. Many of the inhabitants have as a result of the war and have become refugees in Lebanon.
