= Tahuneh =

Tahuneh (Persian: طاحونه) may refer to the following places in Iran:

- Tahuneh, Darab, Fars Province
- Tahuneh, Jahrom, Fars Province
- Tahuneh, Hormozgan
- Tahuneh, Kerman
- Tahuneh, Yazd

== See also ==
- Tahunet Elhalawa, a village in Syria
- Tahuna (disambiguation)
