= Rudat al-Tar =

Rudat al-Tar روضة الطار
- Village
- Location in Syria
- Country: Syria
- Governorate: Hama
- District: Al-Suqaylabiyah District
- Subdistrict: Al-Suqaylabiyah Nahiyah

Population (2004)
  - Total: 744
- Time zone: UTC+3 (AST)
- City Qrya Pcode: N/A

Rudat al-Tar (Arabic: روضة الطار rūḍat aṭ-ṭār) is a Syrian village located in Al-Suqaylabiyah Nahiyah in Al-Suqaylabiyah District, Hama. According to the Syria Central Bureau of Statistics (CBS), the village had a population of 744 in the 2004 census.
