= Mashta Elshalahmeh =

Mashta Elshalahmeh مشتى الشلاهمة
- Village
- Location in Syria
- Country: Syria
- Governorate: Hama
- District: Al-Suqaylabiyah District
- Subdistrict: Al-Suqaylabiyah Nahiyah

Population (2004)
  - Total: 326
- Time zone: UTC+3 (AST)
- City Qrya Pcode: C3133

Mashta Elshalahmeh (Arabic: مشتى الشلاهمة) is a Syrian village located in Al-Suqaylabiyah Nahiyah in Al-Suqaylabiyah District, Hama. According to the Syria Central Bureau of Statistics (CBS), Mashta Elshalahmeh had a population of 326 in the 2004 census.
