= Hir Elmosil =

Hir Elmosil حير المسيل
- Village
- Location in Syria
- Coordinates: 35.267442°N 36.334469°E
- Country: Syria
- Governorate: Hama
- District: Al-Suqaylabiyah District
- Subdistrict: Tell Salhab

Population (2004)
  - Total: 579
- Time zone: UTC+3 (AST)
- City Qrya Pcode: C3149

Hir Elmosil (Arabic: حير المسيل) is a Syrian village located in Tell Salhab Subdistrict in Al-Suqaylabiyah District, Hama. According to the Syria Central Bureau of Statistics (CBS), Hir Elmosil had a population of 579 in the 2004 census.
