= Al-Khandaq al-Gharbi =

Al-Khandaq al-Gharbi الخندق الغربي
- Village
- Location in Syria
- Coordinates: 35°24′46″N 36°18′26″E
- Country: Syria
- Governorate: Hama
- District: Suqaylabiyah
- Subdistrict: Suqaylabiyah

Population (2004)
  - Total: 1,456
- Time zone: UTC+3 (AST)
- City Qrya Pcode: C3129

Al-Khandaq al-Gharbi (Arabic: الخندق الغربي al-khandaq al-gharbī) is a Syrian village located in the Suqaylabiyah Subdistrict of the al-Suqaylabiyah District in Hama Governorate. According to the Syria Central Bureau of Statistics (CBS), the village had a population of 1,456 in the 2004 census.

On 29 September 2025, bushes around the shrine of Sheikh Mohammed Al-Ajami in the village were set on fire, causing damage to the area surrounding it. Locals accused outside sectarian militias under the protection of the Syrian regime of being behind the action.
