= Qal'at al-Jaras =

Qal'at al-Jaras قلعة الجراص
- Village
- Location in Syria
- Country: Syria
- Governorate: Hama
- District: Al-Suqaylabiyah District
- Subdistrict: Al-Suqaylabiyah Nahiyah

Population (2004)
  - Total: 776
- Time zone: UTC+3 (AST)
- City Qrya Pcode: C3132

Qal'at al-Jaras (Arabic: قلعة الجراص qal‘at al-jarāṣ) is a Syrian village located in Al-Suqaylabiyah Nahiyah in Al-Suqaylabiyah District, Hama. According to the Syria Central Bureau of Statistics (CBS), the village had a population of 776 in the 2004 census.
