= Rasm Eljern =

Rasm Eljern رسم الجرن
- Village
- Location in Syria
- Coordinates: 35.328098°N 36.347001°E
- Country: Syria
- Governorate: Hama
- District: Al-Suqaylabiyah District
- Subdistrict: Tell Salhab

Population (2004)
  - Total: 314
- Time zone: UTC+3 (AST)
- City Qrya Pcode: C3139

Rasm Eljern (Arabic: رسم الجرن) is a Syrian village located in Tell Salhab Subdistrict in Al-Suqaylabiyah District, Hama. According to the Syria Central Bureau of Statistics (CBS), Rasm Eljern had a population of 314 in the 2004 census.
