= Mass graves in Syria =

Mass graves found after the fall of the Assad regime

Syrian mass graves
- Part of War crimes in the Syrian civil war
- Location: Damascus Governorate, Rif Dimashq Governorate, Southern Syria
- Date: Throughout the Assad regime of both Hafez and Bashar
- Attack type: War crimes, including torture and execution
- Victims: >120,000 overall (estimated) (Note: >100,000 estimated at the al-Qutayfah site, with a lower bound of 20,000 added based on the "Several tens of thousands" estimate for the Najha site.) >100,000 in al-Qutayfah "Several tens of thousands" in Najha
- Perpetrator: (Ba'athist Syria) Assad regime

A number of mass graves were uncovered after the fall of the Assad regime in December 2024. The primary site was located in al-Qutayfah, approximately 37 km (23 mi) north of Damascus, with additional mass graves discovered throughout the southern Damascus countryside and in southern Syria. The primary al-Qutayfah site was predicted by investigators to contain the human remains of at least 100,000 people who had been systematically and extrajudicially killed.

== Discovery ==
Following the fall of the Assad regime in mid-December 2024, graves attributed to the rule of the Assad family, including both Bashar al-Assad and his father Hafez al-Assad, were uncovered by NGOs such as Human Rights Watch along with several academic researchers associated with the NIOD Institute for War, Holocaust and Genocide Studies and the University of Amsterdam. Their regime conducted widespread extrajudicial killings according to Syrian rebel groups, Syrian civilians, and academic experts, particularly within Syria's prison system, resulting in hundreds of thousands of casualties over several decades. The International Commission on Missing Persons, headquartered in The Hague, The Netherlands, reported the presence of at least 66 mass grave sites across Syria.

The total number of disappeared persons since 2011 exceeds 100,000, according to the Syrian Emergency Task Force. Organizations including the Syrian Observatory for Human Rights documented approximately 80,000 confirmed deaths among the missing, with an additional 60,000 individuals believed to have died from torture.

=== Damascus ===
==== al-Qutayfah ====
A mass grave uncovered in al-Qutayfah in the countryside 25km north of Damascus emerged as the most substantial discovery by quantity, characterized by investigators as a centralized burial location for the Assad regime. Investigators estimated that the mass grave contained the human remains of at least 100,000 people.

Academic researchers, including University of Amsterdam genocide studies professor Uğur Ümit Üngör, described the site as "a reflection of the killing machine of the Assad regime". Syrian Air Force Intelligence was identified as the primary organization responsible for transporting deceased individuals from medical facilities or prisons to the burial sites.

Local witnesses reported seeing security forces transporting bodies in refrigerated containers throughout the Syrian civil war. Religious leader Abdul Kadir al-Sheikha provided testimony about conducting burial rites for at least 100 victims within a 30-square-meter area, before being excluded from further ceremonies by secret police.

==== Najha ====
A second large mass grave was found in the settlement of Najha in the southern Damascus countryside. Initial assessments by international experts indicated the potential presence of several tens of thousands of victims. The site's complexity was heightened by its proximity to an existing cemetery, with investigators discovering that some victims were buried beneath previously established graves. Surface-level examinations revealed exposed human remains, including Vertebrae and femur fragments.

==== Tadamon ====
Human Rights Watch's examination of the Tadamon neighborhood in southern Damascus revealed a mass grave associated with the Tadamon massacre in April 2013, along with additional human remains spread throughout the area bearing marks consistent with execution-style killings.

Spatial analysis of the site revealed a machine-excavated grave measuring approximately three meters by seven meters, with a depth of two meters. Primary video evidence collected by researchers captured the execution of 41 individuals during a single incident, including the deaths of 11 blindfolded victims who were "shot at close range" and then pushed into the pre-dug grave alongside 13 other bodies. Additional evidence suggested that at least 288 individuals, including seven women and twelve children, were killed in the broader Tadamon area.

==== Adra ====
In the northwestern Damascus suburb of Adra, approximately 10 kilometers from the city center, investigators discovered multiple burial sites within a walled-off area. White Helmets humanitarian teams recovered skeletal remains stored in white plastic bags, with preliminary findings indicating at least seven bodies in one location. The recovery teams implemented systematic documentation procedures, collecting DNA samples and preserving evidence for future identification efforts.

==== Husseiniyeh ====
A mass grave site in Husseiniyeh along a road leading to Damascus International Airport was identified through satellite imagery analysis.

==== Sayyidah Zaynab ====
On 18 December 2024, a mass grave was uncovered by Syrian White Helmets in the Damascus suburb of Sayyidah Zaynab, containing the human remains of at least 21 people. The mass grave was located in a predominantly Shia Islam neighborhood close to the Sayyida Zaynab Mosque, at a site used by Hezbollah and Iranian-backed militia groups prior to the fall of the Assad regime. Many of the human remains were found in small pieces or in incomplete fragments.

==== Al-Dumayr ====
In late December 2025, the Syrian transitional government ordered the military to secure a mass grave at a former military base near Al-Dumayr, Rif Dimashq Governorate, and opened a criminal investigation into a covert operation that transferred thousands of bodies there from another site during the previous administration.

=== Deir ez-Zor ===
On 16 December 2024, A recently created mass grave containing the bodies of 17 executed Syrian Army soldiers is discovered in the Syrian Desert near Deir ez-Zor.

=== Southern Syria ===
Investigators uncovered twelve separate mass graves in southern Syria. One particularly notable site contained 22 victims, including women and children, who displayed evidence of torture and execution.

==== Izra ====
On 16 December 2024, 15 corpses, including women and children, were discovered buried in Mazra'at al-Kuwaiti near Izra, an area previously controlled by a militia linked to the Military Security Branch.

==== Qarfa ====
On 22 December 2024, a mass grave containing the remains of 93 civilians was discovered in Qarfa, Daraa Governorate. All of the victims were believed to have been burnt alive based on testimony from former Military Intelligence Directorate troops, several of whom were women and children.

==== Umm Al Qusur ====
On 25 December 2024, six corpses were found buried in a field near Umm Al Qusur, dated back to over ten years ago.

==== Al-Sanamayn ====
On 3 January 2025, residents in southern Syria discovered a mass grave in the vicinity of the 9th Division in al-Sanamayn, containing skeletal remains and clothing, likely buried over a decade ago.

=== Homs ===
On 23 December 2024, a mass grave containing over 1,200 individuals detained during the Assad regime was discovered in Homs, with the bodies reportedly transferred from the Homs Military Hospital.

==== Al-Qabou ====
On 29 December 2024, three mass graves of 20 civilians, arrested at military checkpoints of the Assad regime, were discovered in Al-Qabou, Homs Governorate.

=== Aleppo ===
On 30 December 2024, a mass grave was discovered in Aleppo, where a witness reported seeing hundreds of detainees being buried.

== Response ==
The interim Syrian government, led by de facto leader Ahmed al-Sharaa, pledged to prosecute those responsible for the atrocities. Al-Sharaa requested United Nations assistance in documenting the Assad regime's crimes and emphasized the administration's commitment to justice. In response, Human Rights Watch urged Syrian transitional authorities to preserve the physical evidence present at burial sites nationwide.

The transitional government established a hotline for citizens and former prisoners to report locations of secret prisons and potential burial sites.

Former United States war crimes ambassador Stephen Rapp, who led several prosecutions at war crime tribunals in Rwanda and Sierra Leone, stated that the magnitude of state-organized systematic killings present implicated by the grave sites had not been observed "since the Nazis".

Genocide studies experts recommended establishing a DNA repository to assist in identifying victims and providing closure to affected families.

== See also ==
- Sednaya Prison
- Human rights in Ba'athist Syria
- List of massacres during the Syrian civil war
- War crimes in the Syrian civil war
