= Balluneh =

Balluneh بلونة
- Village
- Location in Syria
- Country: Syria
- Governorate: Hama
- District: Al-Suqaylabiyah District
- Subdistrict: Al-Suqaylabiyah Nahiyah

Population (2004)
  - Total: 60
- Time zone: UTC+3 (AST)
- City Qrya Pcode: C3118

Balluneh (Arabic: بلونة) is a Syrian village located in Al-Suqaylabiyah Nahiyah in Al-Suqaylabiyah District, Hama. According to the Syria Central Bureau of Statistics (CBS), Balluneh had a population of 60 in the 2004 census.
