= Deir Sunbul =

Deir Sunbul دير سنبل
- Village
- Location in Syria
- Country: Syria
- Governorate: Hama
- District: Al-Suqaylabiyah District
- Subdistrict: Qalaat al-Madiq

Population (2004)
  - Total: 1,037
- Time zone: UTC+3 (AST)
- City Qrya Pcode: C3190

Deir Sunbul (Arabic: دير سنبل) is a Syrian village located in Qalaat al-Madiq Subdistrict in Al-Suqaylabiyah District, Hama. According to the Syria Central Bureau of Statistics (CBS), Deir Sunbul had a population of 1,037 in the 2004 census.
