= Tamaza =

Tamaza تمازة
- Village
- Location in Syria
- Coordinates: 35.267680°N 36.251970°E
- Country: Syria
- Governorate: Hama
- District: Al-Suqaylabiyah District
- Subdistrict: Tell Salhab

Population (2004)
  - Total: 101
- Time zone: UTC+3 (AST)
- City Qrya Pcode: C3143

Tamaza (Arabic: تمازة) is a Syrian village located in Tell Salhab Subdistrict in Al-Suqaylabiyah District, Hama. According to the Syria Central Bureau of Statistics (CBS), Tamaza had a population of 101 in the 2004 census.
