= Al-Qashati =

Al-Qashati القشاطي
- Village
- Location in Syria
- Coordinates: 35.292640°N 36.327318°E
- Country: Syria
- Governorate: Hama
- District: Al-Suqaylabiyah District
- Subdistrict: Tell Salhab

Population (2004)
  - Total: 969
- Time zone: UTC+3 (AST)
- City Qrya Pcode: N/A

Al-Qashati (Arabic: القشاطي al-qashāṭī) is a Syrian village located in Tell Salhab Subdistrict in Al-Suqaylabiyah District, Hama. According to the Syria Central Bureau of Statistics (CBS), the village had a population of 969 in the 2004 census.
