= Al-Latma =

Latmana اللطمة
- Village
- Location in Syria
- Coordinates: 35.334488°N 36.360862°E
- Country: Syria
- Governorate: Hama
- District: Al-Suqaylabiyah District
- Subdistrict: Tell Salhab

Population (2004)
  - Total: 406
- Time zone: UTC+3 (AST)
- City Qrya Pcode: C3138

Latmana (Arabic: اللطمة) is a Syrian village located in Tell Salhab Subdistrict in Al-Suqaylabiyah District, Hama. According to the Syria Central Bureau of Statistics (CBS), Latmana had a population of 406 in the 2004 census.
