= Abu Kleefun =

Abu Kleefun أبو كليفون
- Village
- Location in Syria
- Country: Syria
- Governorate: Hama
- District: Al-Suqaylabiyah District
- Subdistrict: Al-Suqaylabiyah Nahiyah

Population (2004)
  - Total: 72
- Time zone: UTC+3 (AST)
- City Qrya Pcode: C3109

Abu Kleefun (Arabic: أبو كليفون) is a Syrian village located in Al-Suqaylabiyah Nahiyah in Al-Suqaylabiyah District, Hama. According to the Syria Central Bureau of Statistics (CBS), Abu Kleefun had a population of 72 in the 2004 census.
