= Al-Sha'irah =

Al-Sha'irah الشعيرة
- Village
- Location in Syria
- Coordinates: 35°34′7″N 36°18′35″E
- Country: Syria
- Governorate: Hama
- District: Suqaylabiyah
- Subdistrict: Qalaat al-Madiq

Population (2004)
  - Total: 529
- Time zone: UTC+3 (AST)
- City Qrya Pcode: N/A

Al-Sha'irah (Arabic: الشعيرة) is a village in northern Syria located in the Qalaat al-Madiq Subdistrict of the al-Suqaylabiyah District in Hama Governorate. According to the Syria Central Bureau of Statistics (CBS), al-Sha'irah had a population of 529 in the 2004 census.
