= Hawijah Sayyad =

Hweijeh Elsiad حويجة السياد
- Village
- Location in Syria
- Coordinates: 35.519984°N 36.376848°E
- Country: Syria
- Governorate: Hama
- District: Al-Suqaylabiyah District
- Subdistrict: Qalaat al-Madiq

Population (2004)
  - Total: 846
- Time zone: UTC+3 (AST)
- City Qrya Pcode: N/A

Hweijeh Elsiad (Arabic: حويجة السياد) is a Syrian village located in Qalaat al-Madiq Subdistrict in Al-Suqaylabiyah District, Hama. According to the Syria Central Bureau of Statistics (CBS), Hweijeh Elsiad had a population of 846 in the 2004 census.
