= Al-Barid =

Al-Barid البارد
- Village
- Location in Syria
- Coordinates: 35°26′2″N 36°18′47″E
- Country: Syria
- Governorate: Hama
- District: Suqaylabiyah
- Subdistrict: Qalaat al-Madiq

Population (2004)
  - Total: 710
- Time zone: UTC+3 (AST)
- City Qrya Pcode: C3201

Al-Barid (Arabic: البارد, also spelled al-Bared) is a village in northern Syria located in the Qalaat al-Madiq Subdistrict of the al-Suqaylabiyah District in Hama Governorate. According to the Syria Central Bureau of Statistics (CBS), al-Barid had a population of 710 in the 2004 census. Its inhabitants are predominantly Alawites.
