= Ammurin =

Ammurin عمورين
- Village
- Country: Syria
- Governorate: Hama
- District: Al-Suqaylabiyah District
- Subdistrict: Al-Suqaylabiyah Nahiyah

Population (2004)
  - Total: 1,145
- Time zone: UTC+3 (AST)
- City Qrya Pcode: C3134

Ammurin (Arabic: عمورين) is a Syrian village located in Al-Suqaylabiyah Nahiyah in Al-Suqaylabiyah District, Hama. According to the Syria Central Bureau of Statistics (CBS), Ammurin had a population of 1,145 in the 2004 census.
