= Al-Khandaq al-Sharqiyah =

Coordinates: 35°23′20″N 36°18′25″E

Al-Khandaq al-Sharqiyah الخندق الشرقي
- Village
- Location in Syria
- Country: Syria
- Governorate: Hama
- District: Suqaylabiyah
- Subdistrict: Suqaylabiyah

Population (2004)
  - Total: 737
- Time zone: UTC+3 (AST)
- City Qrya Pcode: C3128

Al-Khandaq al-Sharqiyah (Arabic: الخندق الشرقي) is a Syrian village located in the Suqaylabiyah Subdistrict of the al-Suqaylabiyah District in Hama Governorate. Its population in 2004 was 737.
