= Kanayes =

Kanayes الكنائس
- Village
- Location in Syria
- Coordinates: 35.213934°N 36.303542°E
- Country: Syria
- Governorate: Hama
- District: Al-Suqaylabiyah District
- Subdistrict: Tell Salhab

Population (2004)
  - Total: 481
- Time zone: UTC+3 (AST)
- City Qrya Pcode: C3137

Kanayes (Arabic: الكنائس) is a Syrian village located in Tell Salhab Subdistrict in Al-Suqaylabiyah District, Hama. According to the Syria Central Bureau of Statistics (CBS), Kanayes had a population of 481 in the 2004 census.
