= Elrihana =

Elrihana الريحانة
- Village
- Country: Syria
- Governorate: Hama
- District: Al-Suqaylabiyah District
- Subdistrict: Al-Suqaylabiyah Nahiyah

Population (2004)
  - Total: 692
- Time zone: UTC+3 (AST)
- City Qrya Pcode: N/A

Elrihana (Arabic: الريحانة) is a Syrian village located in Al-Suqaylabiyah Nahiyah in Al-Suqaylabiyah District, Hama. According to the Syria Central Bureau of Statistics (CBS), Elrihana had a population of 692 in the 2004 census.
