= Tal Kombatri =

Tal Kombatri تل كمبتري
- Village
- Location in Syria
- Coordinates: 35.342470°N 36.313375°E
- Country: Syria
- Governorate: Hama
- District: Al-Suqaylabiyah District
- Subdistrict: Al-Suqaylabiyah Nahiyah

Population (2004)
  - Total: 850
- Time zone: UTC+3 (AST)
- City Qrya Pcode: C3112

Tal Kombatri (Arabic: تل كمبتري) is a Syrian village located in Al-Suqaylabiyah Nahiyah in Al-Suqaylabiyah District, Hama. According to the Syria Central Bureau of Statistics (CBS), Tal Kombatri had a population of 850 in the 2004 census.
