= Al-Humayrat =

Hmeirat الحميرات
- Village
- Location in Syria
- Coordinates: 35.457589°N 36.458752°E
- Country: Syria
- Governorate: Hama
- District: Al-Suqaylabiyah District
- Subdistrict: Qalaat al-Madiq

Population (2004)
  - Total: 658
- Time zone: UTC+3 (AST)
- City Qrya Pcode: C3187

Hmeirat (Arabic: الحميرات) is a Syrian village located in Qalaat al-Madiq Subdistrict in Al-Suqaylabiyah District, Hama. According to the Syria Central Bureau of Statistics (CBS), Hmeirat had a population of 658 in the 2004 census.
