= Maksar, Hama =

Maksar, Hama المكسر
- Village
- Country: Syria
- Governorate: Hama
- District: Al-Suqaylabiyah District
- Subdistrict: Al-Suqaylabiyah Nahiyah

Population (2004)
  - Total: 113
- Time zone: UTC+3 (AST)
- City Qrya Pcode: N/A

Maksar, Hama (Arabic: المكسر) is a Syrian village located in Al-Suqaylabiyah Nahiyah in Al-Suqaylabiyah District, Hama. According to the Syria Central Bureau of Statistics (CBS), Maksar, Hama had a population of 113 in the 2004 census.
