= Khansaa - Shetheh =

Khansaa - Shetheh الخنساء الشعثة
- Village
- Country: Syria
- Governorate: Hama
- District: Al-Suqaylabiyah District
- Subdistrict: Al-Suqaylabiyah Nahiyah

Population (2004)
  - Total: 715
- Time zone: UTC+3 (AST)
- City Qrya Pcode: C3115

Khansaa - Shetheh (Arabic: الخنساء الشعثة) is a Syrian village located in Al-Suqaylabiyah Nahiyah in Al-Suqaylabiyah District, Hama. According to the Syria Central Bureau of Statistics (CBS), Khansaa - Shetheh had a population of 715 in the 2004 census.
