= Al-Kurkat =

Elkrkat الكركات
- Village
- Location in Syria
- Coordinates: 35.477639°N 36.385303°E
- Country: Syria
- Governorate: Hama
- District: Al-Suqaylabiyah District
- Subdistrict: Qalaat al-Madiq

Population (2004)
  - Total: 847
- Time zone: UTC+3 (AST)
- City Qrya Pcode: N/A

Elkrkat (Arabic: الكركات) is a Syrian village located in Qalaat al-Madiq Subdistrict in Al-Suqaylabiyah District, Hama. According to the Syria Central Bureau of Statistics (CBS), Elkrkat had a population of 847 in the 2004 census.
