= Annab =

Annab عناب
- Village
- Location in Syria
- Coordinates: 35°25′35″N 36°14′20″E
- Country: Syria
- Governorate: Hama
- District: Suqaylabiyah
- Subdistrict: Suqaylabiyah

Population (2018)
  - Total: 8,000
- Time zone: UTC+3 (AST)
- City Qrya Pcode: C3117

Annab (Arabic: عناب) is a village in central Syria, administratively part of the al-Suqaylabiyah District of the Hama Governorate. The neighboring village of Nabe al-Tayeb was incorporated into Annab and later the combined village was incorporated into the municipality of Ayn al-Kurum. Annab is located 75 kilometers (47 mi) northwest of Hama and lies on the western edges of the Ghab Plain and the eastern foothills of the Syrian Coastal Mountains.

The village is characterized by the dense oak, cypress and elm forests and vegetation which envelope it on all sides. It was named for the nearby spring of Annab, which itself is locally held to be named for either the jujube (annab) bushes or grape (anab) vines of the area. Agriculture, particularly grain cultivation, is the mainstay of Annab's economy. In 2018, it had an estimated population of 8,000. Its inhabitants are predominantly Alawites.

== History ==
In 1733 or 1734, Annab and neighboring Ayn al-Kurum became a refuge for the Shillif brothers Hassun and Ahmad (sons of Muhammad Ibn Shillif). The Shillifs were a prominent family of Alawites known in the Ottoman government sources and Alawite oral tradition for their brigandage in the Syrian coastal mountains and adjacent plains. The brothers had gained safe haven in the two villages from their pursuit by the Ottoman governor of Latakia, who was attempting to suppress a rebellion they were leading among the local Alawites and Christians in the sanjak (district).

About ten years later, an Ottoman firman alleged that some 3,000 Alawite villagers from Ayn al-Kurum, Deir Mama, Annab and elsewhere in the vicinity had raided the coastal fortress of al-Marqab and over two dozen villages, burning several homes, trespassing the mosque at Marqab and seizing livestock. The governor of Tripoli Eyalet was ordered to capture the perpetrators and return the stolen goods, but instead he led the men of al-Marqab on a rampage through the Alawite country up to the castle of Qal'at al-Mudiq in the Ghab Plain. In early 1759, 200 Alawites from Annab led by the muqaddam Ja'far (known by the authorities for his brigandage) raided Qal'at al-Madiq, taking hundreds of oxen and water buffalo.

== Bibliography ==
- Winter, Stefan (2016). A History of the 'Alawis: From Medieval Aleppo to the Turkish Republic. Princeton and Oxford: Princeton University Press. ISBN 9780691167787.
