= Ein Eljern =

Ein Eljern عين الجرن
- Village
- Location in Syria
- Coordinates: 35.238328°N 36.349704°E
- Country: Syria
- Governorate: Hama
- District: Al-Suqaylabiyah District
- Subdistrict: Tell Salhab

Population (2004)
  - Total: 728
- Time zone: UTC+3 (AST)
- City Qrya Pcode: C3146

Ein Eljern (Arabic: عين الجرن) is a Syrian village located in Tell Salhab Subdistrict in Al-Suqaylabiyah District, Hama. According to the Syria Central Bureau of Statistics (CBS), Ein Eljern had a population of 728 in the 2004 census.
