= Khareb =

Khareb الخرائب
- Village
- Location in Syria
- Coordinates: 35.229329°N 36.308795°E
- Country: Syria
- Governorate: Hama
- District: Al-Suqaylabiyah District
- Subdistrict: Tell Salhab

Population (2004)
  - Total: 241
- Time zone: UTC+3 (AST)
- City Qrya Pcode: C3147

Khareb (Arabic: الخرائب; also spelled Kharayeb) is a Syrian village that is located in the Tell Salhab Subdistrict of Al-Suqaylabiyah District, in Hama. According to the Syria Central Bureau of Statistics (CBS), Khareb had a population of 241 in the 2004 census.

In 2018, archaeologists revealed a Byzantine mosaic painting of a church that dates back to the fifth century AD. The painting, which was decorated with geometric shapes and inscriptions in Latin, was unearthed in this village.
