= Abr Beit Seif =

Abar Beit Seif عبر بيت سيف
- Village
- Location in Syria
- Coordinates: 35°22′45″N 36°18′59″E
- Country: Syria
- Governorate: Hama
- District: Al-Suqaylabiyah District
- Subdistrict: Al-Suqaylabiyah Nahiyah

Population (2004)
  - Total: 2,819
- Time zone: UTC+3 (AST)
- City Qrya Pcode: C3113

Abar Beit Seif (Arabic: عبر بيت سيف) is a Syrian village located in Al-Suqaylabiyah Nahiyah in Al-Suqaylabiyah District, Hama. According to the Syria Central Bureau of Statistics (CBS), the village had a population of 2,819 in the 2004 census.
