= Saqiyat Najm =

Saqiyet Nijm ساقية نجم
- Village
- Location in Syria
- Coordinates: 35°22′15″N 36°16′00″E
- Country: Syria
- Governorate: Hama
- District: Al-Suqaylabiyah District
- Subdistrict: Al-Suqaylabiyah Nahiyah

Population (2004)
  - Total: 1,932
- Time zone: UTC+3 (AST)
- City Qrya Pcode: C3125

Saqiyet Nijm (Arabic: ساقية نجم) is a Syrian village located in Al-Suqaylabiyah Nahiyah in Al-Suqaylabiyah District, Hama. According to the Syria Central Bureau of Statistics (CBS), Saqiyet Nijm had a population of 1,932 in the 2004 census.
