= Qabr Fidda =

Qabr Fiddah قبر فضة
- Village
- Location in Syria
- Coordinates: 35°28′25″N 36°19′6″E
- Country: Syria
- Governorate: Hama
- District: Suqaylabiyah
- Subdistrict: Qalaat al-Madiq

Population (2004)
  - Total: 1,490
- Time zone: UTC+3 (AST)
- City Qrya Pcode: C3208

Qabr Fiddah (Arabic: قبر فضة) is a village in northern Syria located in the Qalaat al-Madiq Subdistrict of the al-Suqaylabiyah District in Hama Governorate. According to the Syria Central Bureau of Statistics (CBS), Qabr Fiddah had a population of 1,490 in the 2004 census. Its inhabitants are predominantly Sunni Muslims.

The village suffered substantial physical destruction during the Syrian Civil War and all of its residents were displaced, most of them becoming IDPs in the Idlib and Latakia Governorates. People began returning after the conflict, with a total of 360 returnees living in the village as of 21 April 2025.
