= 2018 in archaeology =

This page lists major archaeological events of 2018.

== Excavations ==
- May 20–June 16 - Excavation of Shiloh in Samaria.
- June - Excavation at the site of the 1969 Woodstock music festival in New York (state).
- August - Further excavation at the site of Sheffield Castle in Yorkshire, England.
- Foundations of original Wulfhall in Burbage, Wiltshire, England.
- Start of archaeological investigations along 150 mile route of High Speed 2 railway between London and Birmingham in England ahead of main construction work starting in 2019.

== Explorations ==
- Dives confirm the wreck of a submarine off Dartmouth, Devon (England) to be HMS D1, the prototype British D-class submarine of 1909, expended and scuttled here in 1918.
- May - Investigation of the hulk of the 1852 diving support vessel at Newshot Island in the River Clyde, Scotland.

== Finds ==
- January
  - A prehistoric site, dating back half a million years, is between Jaljulia and Highway 6 in Israel.
  - A hoard of coins and other treasure from the time of Viking ruler Harald Bluetooth is found near Schaprode in Germany.
- January 1 - A 2,700 years old seal with the inscription "belonging to the governor of the city" is discovered in Jerusalem, supporting the Biblical claim that the city had governors at the time.
- January 21 - A bottle thrown into the sea in 1886 as part of a German oceanographic experiment is found on an Australian beach.
- February - An Ancient Egyptian cemetery was found in Minya, Egypt.
- February 3 - Announcement of discovery of the tomb of priestess Hetpet from the Fifth Dynasty of Egypt at Giza with well-preserved wall paintings.
- March 4 - Aircraft carrier USS Lexington, wrecked in 1942 off the north-eastern coast of Australia, discovered by American entrepreneur and explorer Paul Allen (dies October 15).
- March 17 - Light cruiser USS Juneau (CL-52), wrecked in 1942 at the Naval Battle of Guadalcanal, discovered by Paul Allen.
- April - Nazi German submarine U-3523, sunk in 1945 in the Skagerrak, discovered by Sea War Museum Jutland.
- April 13 - The wreck of the slave ship Clotilda (scuttled in 1860) is located in the Mobile River.
- April 22 - A bust of Roman Emperor Marcus Aurelius is unearthed in the Temple of Kom Ombo in the southern city of Aswan, Egypt.
- April 23 - The discovery of the shrine of god Osiris- Ptah Neb, dating back to the 25th dynasty in the Temple of Karnak in Luxor was announced.
- May - Gold Bronze Age Shropshire bulla found in England.
- June
  - Nazi German submarine U-966, sunk in 1943 off the coast of Galicia (Spain), discovered by Spanish divers.
  - A head carving, dating back over 2,800 years, is discovered at the ancient city of Abel-beth-maachah in northern Israel. The sculpture might depict either one of the rulers in the region: King Ahab of Israel, King Hazael of Aram-Damascus or King Ethbaal of Tyre.
- July
  - Russian cruiser Dmitrii Donskoi, scuttled in 1905 following the Battle of Tsushima, discovered by a South Korean treasure-hunting company.
  - An Egyptian sarcophagus of what is initially thought to be the tomb of Alexander the Great is found in groundwater in Alexandria. The sarcophagus is subsequently opened to reveal three skeletons along with some mysterious drawings and a 3,000-year-old cheese.
  - The discovery of an extremely rare Egyptian gilded burial mask which probably dates to Saite-Persian period is announced by German-Egyptian researchers’ team in Saqqara
- August - Foundations of what is thought to be the oldest library in Germany discovered in Cologne; the building dates from 2 AD.
- August 16 - An English-led team announce the identification of embalming chemicals used in Ancient Egypt around 3500 BCE.
- Summer - Pre-Viking sword in Vidöstern lake, Jönköping County, Sweden.
- September - 400-year-old shipwreck off Cascais in Portugal found.
- September 12 - Discovery in Blombos Cave, South Africa, of a stone carrying an (abstract) drawing in ochre pigment about 73,000 years old – the earliest known human drawing – is announced.
- September 17 - A sphinx is discovered at the Temple of Kom Ombo near Aswan, the statue likely dates back to the Ptolemaic dynasty.
- September 25 - Pre-colonial remains are found in Iroungou burial cave, Gabon.
- September 29 - A cemetery of 1,000 layered burials dating back to the Iron Age and a Neolithic village are found near the town of Korçë in southeastern Albania, after 18 months of excavations.
- October 8 - Remains of a 1500-year-old Byzantine church are discovered in Sinanköy, Edirne Province in East Thrace.
- October 13 - A small shrine is discovered in Akrotiri, Greece, dating back to the Bronze Age.
- October 15 - A ship burial subsequently confirmed to contain a Viking ship is discovered by ground-penetrating radar at Gjellestad near Halden, Norway.
- October 18 - A Celtic settlement is found in the Canton of Lucerne, dating back to the first century BC.
- October 23 - Announcement of discovery of the substantially intact wreck of a Greek cargo vessel from around 400 BCE in the Black Sea by an Anglo-Bulgarian team.
- October 31 - A Byzantine mosaic is found in Kharayeb, Syria, which might be a church floor dating back to 412 AD.
- November 7 - Announcement of discovery of an early painting of an animal, a banteng from at least 40,000 years BP, in the Lubang Jeriji Saléh cave in Borneo located by an Australian-led team.
- November 11 - Seven ancient Egyptian tombs are located at the ancient necropolis of Saqqara, dating back to the Fifth and Sixth Dynasties.
- November 16 - A 4,000-year-old board game called 58 holes carved into the floor of a rock shelter in Azerbaijan.
- November 19 - Announcement of discovery of the oldest known Levallois stone tools in East Asia at Guanyindong Cave site, Guizhou, southwest China, dated to approximately 170,000–80,000 years ago.
- November 21 - Announcement of discovery of the ancient Greek city of Limnae on the Gallipoli peninsula, in modern Turkey.
- November 24 - Announcement of discovery of tomb probably from the Eighteenth Dynasty of Egypt with two perfectly preserved mummies in the Assasseef valley near Luxor by a French-led team working since March.
- December
  - Announcement of discovery of United States Air Force Lockheed C-130 Hercules military transport aircraft 37789 crashed in English Channel in 1969.
  - Announcement of discovery of a 15th-century skeleton in thigh-high boots found beside the River Thames in south London.
  - German submarine UC-61, abandoned in 1917, emerges from sands of Wissant in the north of France.
- December 3 - A significant hoard of 24 gold coins and a gold earring is unearthed and tentatively dated to 1101 in Caesarea.
- December 15 - Announcement of discovery of an Egyptian high priest's tomb, dating back to 4,400 years ago, in Saqqara.
- December 21 - A Byzantine church is discovered in Akrotiri Peninsula, Cyprus, dating back to the reign of Emperor Heraclius.
- December 24 - Announcement of discovery of remains of a harnessed horse at the Villa of the Mysteries, Pompeii.
- December 29 - Announcement of discovery of a 13th-century stone ball probably fired from a trebuchet near Edinburgh Castle in Scotland.
- December 30 - Roman sarcophagi found at Tel Al-Deir near Damietta, Egypt.

== Events ==
- August 2 - Reports of tests on 5,000-year-old burnt human bones of 25 people found at Stonehenge in England suggest that ten came from more than 160 km (100 mi) away in West Wales.
- August 15 - 2018 British Isles heat wave: Historic England announces that the dry summer has revealed many new archaeological sites through cropmarks in aerial photography.
- September 2 - National Museum of Brazil in Rio de Janeiro is engulfed by fire.
- October 10 - Troy Museum opens.
- November 21 - Report on the restitution of African cultural heritage published on behalf of the President of France.

== Deaths ==
- January 31 - Elizabeth Hartley, American archaeologist and former Keeper of the Yorkshire Museum (b. 1947).
- July 1 - Gordon Hillman, British archaeobotanist (b. 1943)
- August 1 - Rotraut Wisskirchen, German biblical archaeologist and academic, Order of Merit (2011) (b. 1936)
- August 29 - Robin Birley, English archaeologist, excavator of Vindolanda (b. 1935)
- December 3 - Roger Mercer OBE, British archaeologist (b. 1944)
- December 11 - Noël Duval, French archaeologist, (b. 1929)

== See also ==
- List of years in archaeology
