= Amjad Youssef =

Syrian military officer

- أمجد يوسف
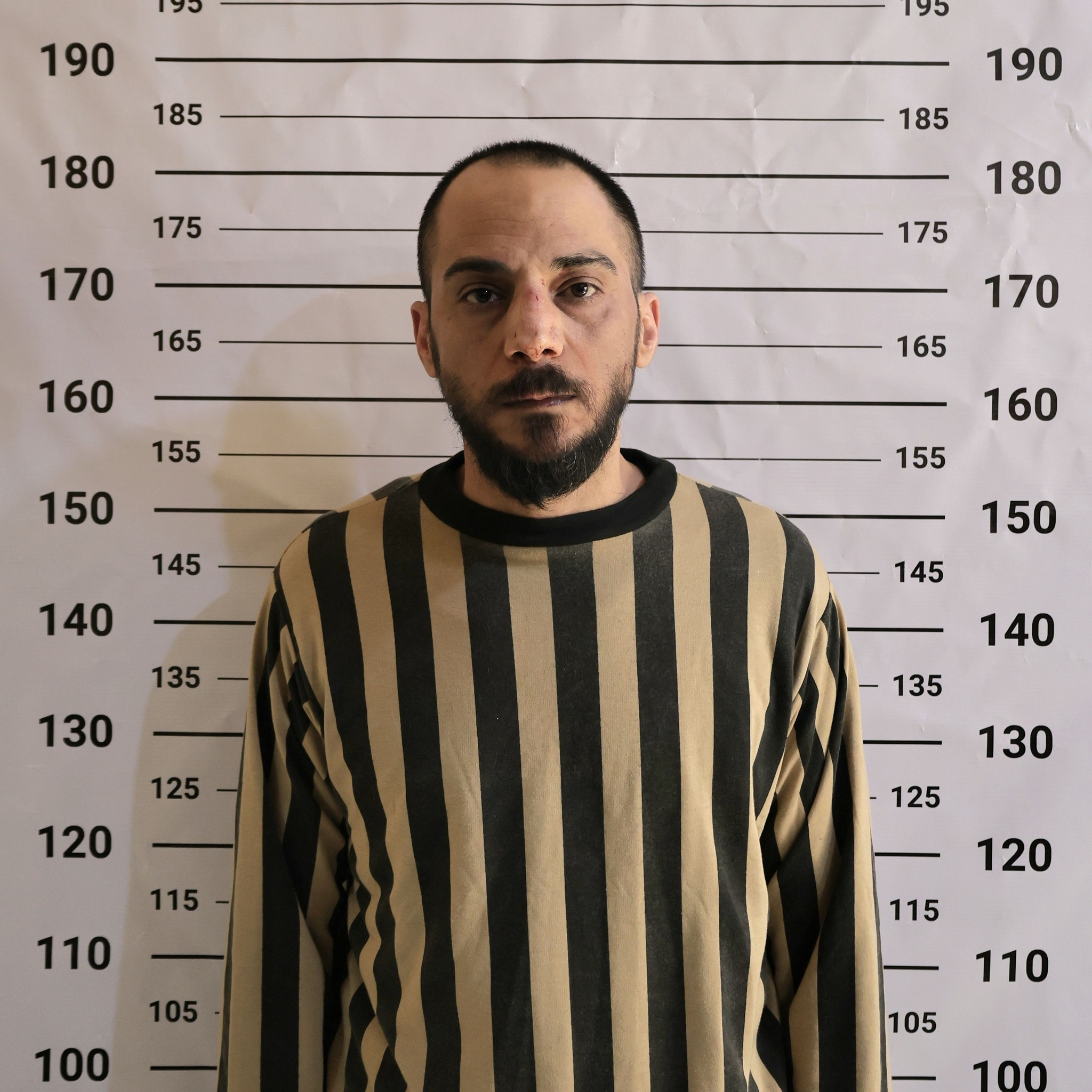
- Mug shot of Youssef in 2026
- Born: 1986 (age 39–40); Nabe al-Tayeb, Syria
- Education: Maysalun Military Intelligence Academy
- Military career
- Allegiance: Ba'athist Syria
- Branch: Military Intelligence Directorate
- Service years: 2004–2024
- Rank: Warrant officer
- Unit: 227 (Rif Dimashq)
- Known for: Tadamon Massacre

Amjad Youssef (born 1986) is a former Syrian Military Intelligence officer under the Assad regime. He is the main suspected perpetrator of the Tadamon massacre in 2013.

== Early life ==
Amjad Youssef was born in 1986 in the Ghab Plain village of Nabe al-Tayeb northwest of Hama, and grew up in a large family of 10 siblings. Youssef has a daughter and a son.

== Career ==
Youssef joined the Military Intelligence Academy in Maysalun in 2004. After 9 months, he graduated as a sergeant and later became a warrant officer and deputy head of Syrian Military Intelligence Branch 227 in Rif Dimashq, where he was responsible for investigating, arresting, torturing and killing political opponents during the 2011 Syrian civil war. He commanded battles in the south of Damascus in Tadamon and Yarmouk, where he was responsible for security operations until 2021, and in 2022 worked at the Kafr Sousa security complex in Damascus.

== Massacre ==
On 16 April 2013, the Tadamon massacre occurred. Syrian Ba'athist forces headed by Youssef brought around 288 civilians to a ditch prepared for cremation with a layer of tires. Youssef and his group mocked the blindfolded and bound civilians before they shot over 40 of them, including 7 women and 15 children, pretending to lead them to safety and telling them to run toward the ditch. The piles of dead civilians were covered with more tires, burned, and buried in a mass grave. The victims were mostly Sunni Muslims.

In 2021, Youssef was identified as one of the leading perpetrators, having been recorded shooting several blindfolded and bound civilians at the ditch.

In 2023, the United States and the European Union placed sanctions on him for his involvement in the massacre, followed by the United Kingdom in 2025.

After the fall of the Assad regime in 2024, Youssef hid from neighbors and authorities for over a year, moving at night between his family's rural home in Nabe al-Tayeb, the forested Syrian Coastal Mountain Range, and rural Qardaha District.

== Arrest ==
On 24 April 2026, Syrian Interior Minister Anas Khattab announced on X that Amjad Youssef was apprehended in the Ghab Plain area in Hama after a successful security operation. Security forces had surveilled Youssef for about two weeks, secured the area by air and by checkpoints, and finally arrested him in his bedroom without incident. Authorities also arrested Youssef's father and several others for sheltering him.

On 25 April 2026, the Syrian Ministry of Interior released Youssef's alleged confession to participating in the massacre. In it, Youssef claimed full responsibility for the whole Tadamon massacre, in an apparent attempt to protect others involved, including superior officers.

Although the National Commission for Transitional Justice began preparing criminal cases against Youssef and other Assad regime actors, Syria still lacked specific laws on war crimes, crimes against humanity, and witness protection, highlighting the need for new legislation by the People's Assembly to formalize these charges.

== See also ==
- Human rights in Ba'athist Syria
- Military Intelligence Directorate (Syria)
- National Commission for Transitional Justice (Syria)
- Tadamon massacre
- Transitional justice
- War crimes in the Syrian civil war
