= Fadi Saqr =

Syrian military commander and lawyer (born 1975)

- فادي صقر
- Born: Fadi Malik Ahmed; 1975 (age 50–51); Jableh, Latakia Governorate, Syria
- Occupation: Lawyer
- Years active: 2012–2024
- Organization(s): Popular Committees; National Defence Forces
- Political party: Independent

Fadi Malik Ahmed, known as Fadi Saqr, (born 1975), is a former military commander in the National Defense Forces, which is an auxiliary militia of the Syrian Ba'athist regime. Syrian opposition activists have nicknamed him the "Butcher of Syria," as he is accused of committing a number of massacres, most notably the 2013 Tadamon massacre.

Saqr was born in the city of Jableh in the Latakia Governorate in 1975. Prior to 2011, he remained outside public life and is not known to have held any official position.

In 2012, Saqr emerged as the commander of one of the factions affiliated with the National Defense Forces militia in the capital, Damascus, and was subsequently appointed to lead the militia across Syrian territory. Within the ranks of the Syrian army, he was given the title "Falcon of the National Defense." Saqr was added to the United States sanctions list in August 2020 due to his involvement in grave human rights abuses.

On May 4, 2025, the Damascus Bar Association issued a disciplinary order disbarring Fadi Malik Ahmed, following the substantiation of his involvement in war crimes and crimes against humanity, including murder, torture, and abduction.

A member of the Civil Peace Committee, Hassan Soufan, disclosed in June 2025 that Fadi Saqr enjoys freedom of movement and activity under the "safe passage" granted to him by Al-Sharaa, noting the services Saqr provided that earned the appreciation of the new Syrian administration. Soufan stated that regardless of whether the violations were proven, he was granted safety in lieu of arrest.

Some have reported that Saqr, alongside other former officers, infiltrated the ranks of the Assad regime's government forces. Widespread accounts suggest that Saqr assisted opposition forces in dispersing government troops or persuading them to avoid confronting the Syrian opposition at the time.
