= War crimes in the Syrian civil war =

Human toll of the Syrian civil war
- Pre-war population 22 ±.5; Internally displaced 6 ±.5, Refugees 5.5 ±.5, Fatalities 0.5 ±.1 (millions)

Syrian refugees
- By country: Turkey, Lebanon, Egypt, Jordan
- Settlements: Camps: Jordan

Internally displaced Syrians

Casualties of the war
- Crimes: War crimes, massacres, rape

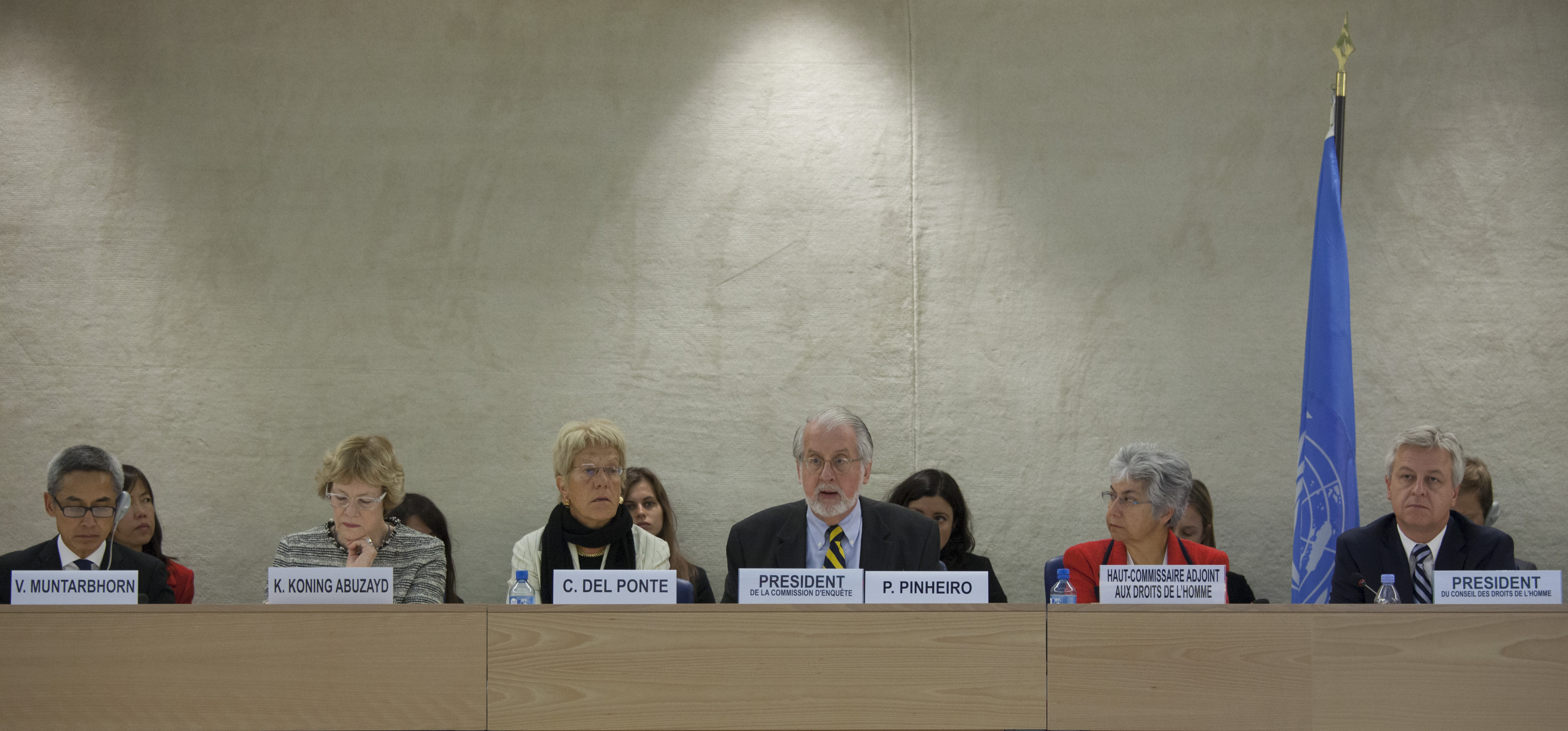
The Independent International Commission of Inquiry on the Syrian Arab Republic present their 6th report to the Human Rights Council on September 16, 2013. The image shows the four commissioners (left to right): Vitit Muntarbhorn, Carla Del Ponte, Karen Koning Abuzayd, Paulo Sérgio Pinheiro

War crimes in the Syrian civil war have been numerous and serious. A United Nations report published in August 2014 stated that "the conduct of the warring parties in the Syrian Arab Republic has caused civilians immeasurable suffering". Another UN report released in 2015 stated that the war has been "characterized by a complete lack of adherence to the norms of international law" and that "civilians have borne the brunt of the suffering inflicted by the warring parties". Various countries have prosecuted several war criminals for a limited number of atrocities committed during the Syrian civil war.

The casualties of the Syrian civil war have been vast; UN envoy to Syria Staffan de Mistura stated in April 2016 that 400,000 people had died in the conflict. In December 2016, 450,000 Syrians were estimated to have been killed; 4.8 million Syrians fled Syria (becoming refugees), 6.3 million were internally displaced within Syria, and 13.5 million required humanitarian assistance. The war has been marked by "devastation and extreme suffering among civilians" and international aid groups "have long denounced the indiscriminate brutality" that has characterized the conflict. In March 2017, the Syrian Observatory for Human Rights reported that 465,000 people had died in the conflict, of which 96,000 civilians, and an additional 145,000 civilians were missing. The SOHR attributed 140,000 civilian deaths to the government of Syrian President Bashar al-Assad and its allies, including Russia and Iran; 7,900 to Syrian rebels and allied forces; 4,900 to Islamic State (IS) organization; 2,670 to the U.S.-led coalition; and 1,000 to Turkey.

According to various human rights organizations and the United Nations, human rights violations have been committed by both the government and the rebels, with the "vast majority of the abuses having been committed by the Syrian government". The U.N. commission investigating human rights abuses in Syria confirms at least nine intentional mass killings in the period 2012 to mid-July 2013, identifying the perpetrator as the Syrian government and its supporters in eight cases, and the opposition in one. The United Nations conducted several further studies. The Assad government used chemical weapons (chlorine gas) against civilians and conducted torture and extrajudicial killings. Assad carried out "indiscriminate and disproportionate aerial bombardment and shelling" which "led to mass civilian casualties and spread terror." Brutal repression, human rights abuses, war crimes and crimes against humanity perpetrated by the Assad government throughout the course of the conflict led to international condemnation and widespread calls to convict Bashar al-Assad in the International Criminal Court (ICC). (Note: Sources:)

According to UN report released in February 2014, the Assad government unleashed a widespread "campaign of terror against the civilian population" through its systematic perpetration of forced disappearances. The report stated that pro-Assad forces "continued to perpetrate massacres and conduct widespread attacks on civilians, systematically committing murder, torture, rape and enforced disappearance amounting to crimes against humanity". According to a UN report published in August 2014, the Assad regime was perpetrating indiscriminate bombing of civilian populations and engaging in chemical warfare, torture, forced disappearances, and extrajudicial murder of detainees. It also asserted that some rebel groups were involved in recruiting child soldiers, shelling civilian-populated areas, kidnapping, and hostage-taking. The report also stated that the Islamic State (IS) group was engaged in systematic targeting of members of religious minorities.

Civilian casualties from airstrikes by the US-led coalition fighting IS are considerable; the Syrian Network for Human Rights reported 2,286 civilian deaths since the beginning of the campaign until September 2017, raising concerns that the coalition failed to take necessary precautions to minimize civilian casualties. Unlawful attacks against civilians and civilian structures in Syria have also been made by the Syrian-Russian coalition forces and other parties, in particular the Russian–Syrian hospital bombing campaign, as well as attacks on schools and mosques. According to Amnesty International's 2017/8 report on Syria, "Parties to the armed conflict committed war crimes and other grave violations of international humanitarian law and human rights abuses with impunity."

== Effect on children ==
A report from UNICEF estimates that over 5 million children are in need in Syria, and due to the spillover effect, 2.5 million more children are in need in neighbouring countries like Jordan and Iraq. From 2014 through 2019, 5,427 children were killed, averaging out to one child death every 10 hours. 60% of child deaths were due to murders and injuries, with the effect of the use of explosives close behind. The WHO reported that the war resulted in nearly three-quarters of hospitals in Syria being unable to function and instead being used as military bases. The long-term conflict resulted in 60.5% of Syrian students developing one of the following mental health conditions: post-traumatic stress disorder (35.1%), depression (32.0%), and anxiety (29.5%). From January 2019 to June 2019, there were 74 attacks on schools in Syria, resulting in over 2 million children being out of school. With limited resources due to the war, 83% of people live in poverty, which resulted in 49% of children from ages 10 to 16 working. In May 2020, following nine years of gruesome war and coronavirus pandemic, inflation in Syria rose to an all-time high since April 2011. The situation resulted in doubling of food prices in just over six months and "children going to bed hungry," Imran Riza, a UN's top official based in Damascus informed.

== Syrian Arab Armed Forces and allied forces ==
According to various UN reports released during 2011-12, Syrian Arab Armed Forces and Ba'athist security apparatus were responsible for:

- unlawful killing, including of children (mostly boys), medical personnel and hospital patients ("In some particularly grave instances, entire families were executed in their homes");
- torture, including of children (mostly boys, sometimes to death) and hospital patients, and including sexual and psychological torture;
- arbitrary arrest "on a massive scale";
- deployment of tanks and helicopter gunships in densely populated areas;
- heavy and indiscriminate shelling of civilian areas;
- collective punishment;
- enforced disappearances;
- widescale and systematic destruction and looting of property;
- the systematic denial, in some areas, of food and water; and the prevention of medical treatment, including to children – in the period since 15 March 2011.

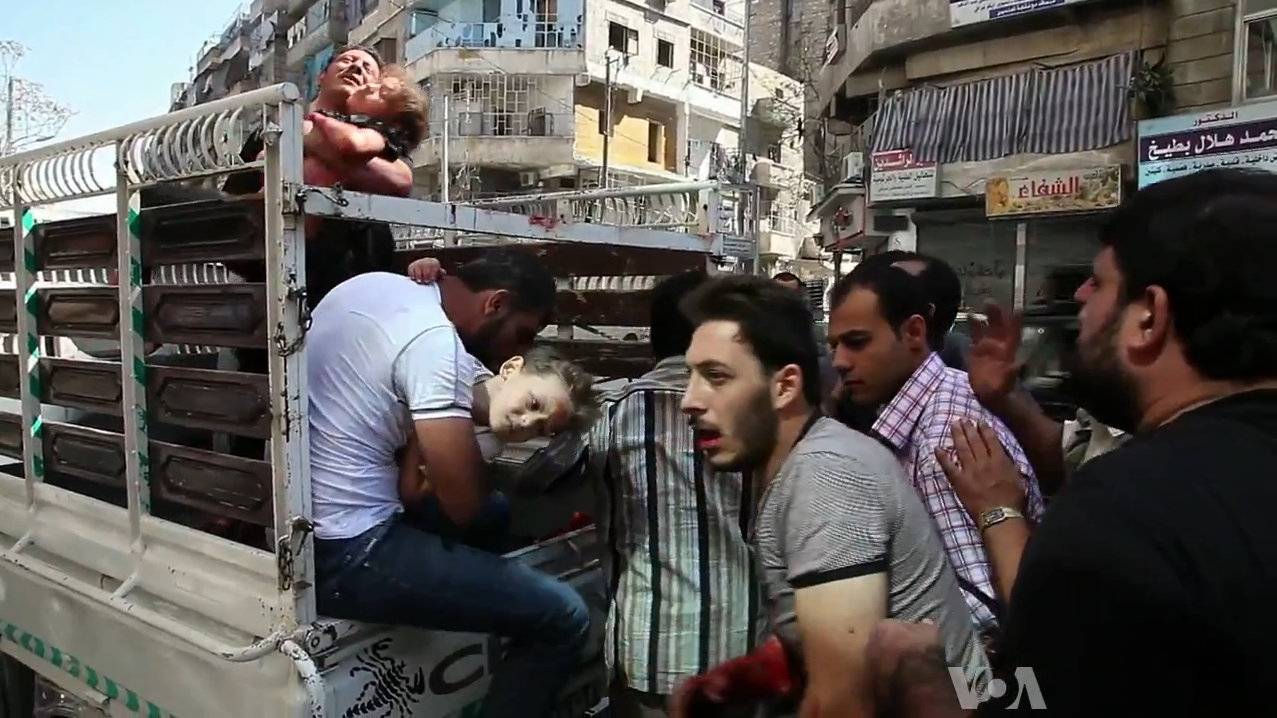
Wounded civilians arrive at a hospital in Aleppo during the Syrian civil war, October 2012

Amnesty International entered the country without government approval in spring 2012 and documented "gross violations of human rights on a massive scale" by the Syrian military and shabiha, "many of which amount to crimes against humanity and war crimes". These were committed against the armed opposition, to punish and intimidate civilian individuals and strongholds perceived to be supporting the opposition, and indiscriminately against individuals who had nothing to do with the opposition. In addition to the crimes listed by the UN above, they noted cases of people being burnt alive; destruction of pharmacies and field hospitals (normal hospitals are out of bounds to those wounded by the military); and that the sometimes lethal torture ("broken bones, missing teeth, deep scars and open wounds from electric shocks, and from severe beatings and lashings with electric cables and other implements") was overwhelmingly directed at men and boys.

Amnesty reported that medical personnel had also been tortured, while the UN said that medical personnel in state hospitals were sometimes complicit in the killing and torture of patients. The execution and torture of children was also documented by Amnesty International and Human Rights Watch. Most of the serious human rights violations documented by the UN have been committed by the Syrian army and security services as part of military or search operations. The pattern of the killing, coupled with interviews with defectors, led the UN to conclude a shoot-to-kill policy was operative. The UN mentioned several reports of security forces killing injured victims by putting them into refrigerated cells in hospital morgues.

The UN reported 10,000 persons arbitrarily detained between mid-March and late-June 2011; a year later that number had more than doubled, though the true number of detainees may have been far higher. At the notorious Seidnaya jail, north of Damascus, 2,500 military officers and lesser ranks were being held after they disobeyed orders or attempted desertion. Human Rights Watch documented more than 20 different methods of torture used against detainees, including: prolonged and severe beatings, often with objects such as batons and wires; painful stress positions; electrocution; burning with car battery acid; sexual assault; pulling out fingernails; mock execution; and sexual violence. Many were held in disgusting and cruelly overcrowded conditions; many who needed medical assistance were denied it, and some consequently died.

Human Rights Watch accused the government and Shabiha of using civilians as human shields when they advanced on opposition-held areas. A UN report confirmed this, saying soldiers had used children as young as eight, detaining and killing children afterwards. The UN added the Syrian Government as one of the worst offenders on its annual "list of shame". In May 2012, Al Arabiya aired leaked footage of a man being tortured in a government detention centre in Kafranbel.

In response to these violations, the UN Human Rights Council passed a condemnatory resolution. It also demanded that Syria cooperate with a UN investigation into the abuses, release all political prisoners, and allow independent monitors to visit detention facilities.

The charity Save the Children conducted interviews in refugee camps with Syrian civilians who had fled the fighting, and released a report in September 2012 containing many accounts of detention, torture and summary execution, as well as other incidents such as the use of civilians as human shields, allegedly including tying children onto advancing tanks so that rebel forces would not fire upon them.

As of recently, the Syrian Army and several pro-Assad Shia Militias desecrated the grave of Umar Ibn Abdulaziz in Idlib. The attack took place on 29 May 2020.

In November 2023, France issued international arrest warrants for Bashar al-Assad, his brother Maher and two Syrian Arab Armed Forces generals Ghassam Abbas and Bassam al-Hassan, charging them with "complicity in crimes against humanity and complicity in war crimes" over their roles in perpetrating the Ghouta chemical attacks.

=== Attacks on civilians in populated areas ===
A number of reports indicated that the Syrian government attacked civilians at bread bakeries with artillery rounds and rockets in opposition-controlled cities and districts in Aleppo province and Aleppo city, shelling indiscriminately. HRW said these are war crimes, as the only military targets in the areas were rebels manning the bakeries and that dozens of civilians were killed.

Upon retaking the capital Damascus after the Battle of Damascus (2012), the Syrian government began a campaign of collective punishment against Sunni suburbs in-and-around the capital which had supported FSA presence in their neighborhoods.

In a 23 October 2012 statement, Human Rights Watch said that Syrian military denials notwithstanding, HRW had "evidence of ongoing cluster bomb attacks" by Syria's air force. HRW confirmed reports "through interviews with victims, other residents and activists who filmed the cluster munitions", as well as "analysis of 64 videos and also photos showing weapon remnants" of cluster bomb strikes. The use, production, stockpiling, and transfer of cluster munitions is prohibited by the 2008 international Convention on Cluster Munitions treaty. Use of cluster bombs have been considered a grave threat to civilian populations because of the bombs' ability to randomly scatter thousands of submunitions or "bomblets" over a vast area, many of which remain waiting to explode, taking civilian lives and limbs long after the conflict is over.

David Nott, a British surgeon who volunteered for five weeks in mid-2013 on the ground in Syria at hospitals in conflict zone, reported that victims of government snipers would all display wounds in a particular area on particular days, indicating that they may have intentionally chosen to target a specific area each day as a sort of "game". On at least one occasion a pregnant woman was found shot through the uterus, killing her unborn child.

The demolition of opposition neighbourhoods was reported during the conflict. The first incident of large-scale demolitions documented by Human Rights Watch took place in July 2012. HRW analysis of satellite imagery in 2014 showed that in the subsequent two years, the Syrian authorities had demolished a total of at least 145 hectares of mostly residential buildings in seven neighbourhoods in Hama and Damascus. A UN report published in February 2014 stated:

"Government forces consistently failed to employ precision weapons when attacking targets in dense urban areas. Repeatedly throughout the reporting period, they deployed highly imprecise munitions with an expansive impact zone. Inevitably, these weapons killed and injured large numbers of civilians. Such weapons included barrel bombs. .... Government helicopters dropped barrel bombs in the hours before break of fast during Ramadan, on fuel depots, and on busy market areas. The information strongly indicates that the manner in which the attacks were carried out, the timing and duration of the attacks demonstrates that the aim of the Government’s campaign of barrel-bombing was to terrorise the civilian population present in the areas attacked, with the clear message that no civilian was safe anywhere at any time of the day or night."

On 16 April 2013, the Tadamon massacre took place in the vicinity of the Othman Mosque in the Tadamon neighbourhood of the Syrian capital of Damascus. Soldiers affiliated with the Syrian Arab Armed Forces, specifically Branch 227 (Damascus branch) of the Military Intelligence Directorate, killed more than 288 civilians during the massacre.

The Syrian government reportedly used "barrel bombs" to attack civilian populations in rebel held territories in defiance of United Nations Security Council Resolution 2139 passed on 22 February 2014. The bombs are "cheaply made, locally produced, and typically constructed from large oil drums, gas cylinders, and water tanks, filled with high explosives and scrap metal to enhance fragmentation, and then dropped from helicopters". According to a UN report published in August 2014:

"Government forces continued to perpetrate massacres and conduct widespread attacks on civilians, systematically committing murder, torture, rape and enforced disappearance amounting to crimes against humanity. Government forces have committed gross violations of human rights and the war crimes of murder, hostage-taking, torture, rape and sexual violence, recruiting and using children in hostilities and targeting civilians. Government forces disregarded the special protection accorded to hospitals and medical and humanitarian personnel. Indiscriminate and disproportionate aerial bombardment and shelling led to mass civilian casualties and spread terror. Government forces used chlorine gas, an illegal weapon."

A 2016 Human Rights Watch (HRW) report stated that pro-Assad forces deliberately carried out indiscriminate attacks against civilian population through aerial bombing. Between February 2014 and January 2015, Human Rights Watch reports that "at least 450 major damage sites" in Syria "showed damage consistent with barrel bomb detonations". A local Syrian group estimates that in the first year after UN resolution 2139 was passed, aerial barrel bomb attacks killed 6,163 civilians in Syria, including 1,892 children. HRW report stated that the Assad government deployed toxic chemicals in numerous barrel bomb attacks between March and May 2015. Pro-Assad forces also imposed forced starvation on civilian populations by besieging numerous residential areas. According to a UN investigation, in September 2016 the Syrian air force dropped barrel bombs from helicopters on a United Nations humanitarian aid convoy at Urum al-Kubra headed to Aleppo. The bombs were followed by rocket fire from jets, and strafing of survivors with machine guns, killing 14 aid workers. In a report issued 1 March 2017, the United Nations found the attack was "meticulously planned" and "ruthlessly carried out"—and because it was deliberate, a war crime.

According to three eminent international lawyers in the 2014 Syrian detainee report Syrian government officials could face war crimes charges in the light of a huge cache of evidence smuggled out of the country showing the "systematic killing" of about 11,000 detainees. Most of the victims were young men and many corpses were emaciated, bloodstained and bore signs of torture. Some had no eyes; others showed signs of strangulation or electrocution. Experts say this evidence is more detailed and on a far larger scale than anything else that had yet emerged from the 34-month crisis.

According to a report by Amnesty International, published in November 2015, the Syrian government had forcibly disappeared more than 65,000 people since the beginning of the Syrian Civil War. According to a report in May 2016 by the Syrian Observatory for Human Rights, at least 60,000 people have been killed through torture or died from dire humanitarian conditions in Syrian government jails since March 2011.

In 2022, The Guardian published a video documenting the 2013 Tadamon massacre, where 41 civilians were shot, their bodies burned and buried in a pit. The executioner was identified as Amjad Youssef from Syria's military intelligence Unit 227 and in a series of interviews, he confirmed the authenticity of the video and admitted to killing the civilians.

On 30 January 2014, Human Rights Watch released a report detailing, between June 2012 and July 2013, government forces razing to the ground seven anti-government districts in the cities of Damascus and Hama, equating to an area the size of 200 football fields. Witnesses spoke of explosives and bulldozers being used to knock down buildings. Satellite imagery was provided as part of the report and the destruction was characterized as collective punishment against residents of rebel-held areas.

On 28 June 2022, UN Human Rights Office published a report, following rigorous assessment and statistical analysis of available data on civilian casualties, that estimates 306,887 civilians were killed between 1 March 2011 and 31 March 2021 in Syria due to the conflict.

On 23 October 2023, Rukban, a refugee camp, was attacked by a drone launched by Syrian and Iraqi militants.

=== Chemical attacks ===
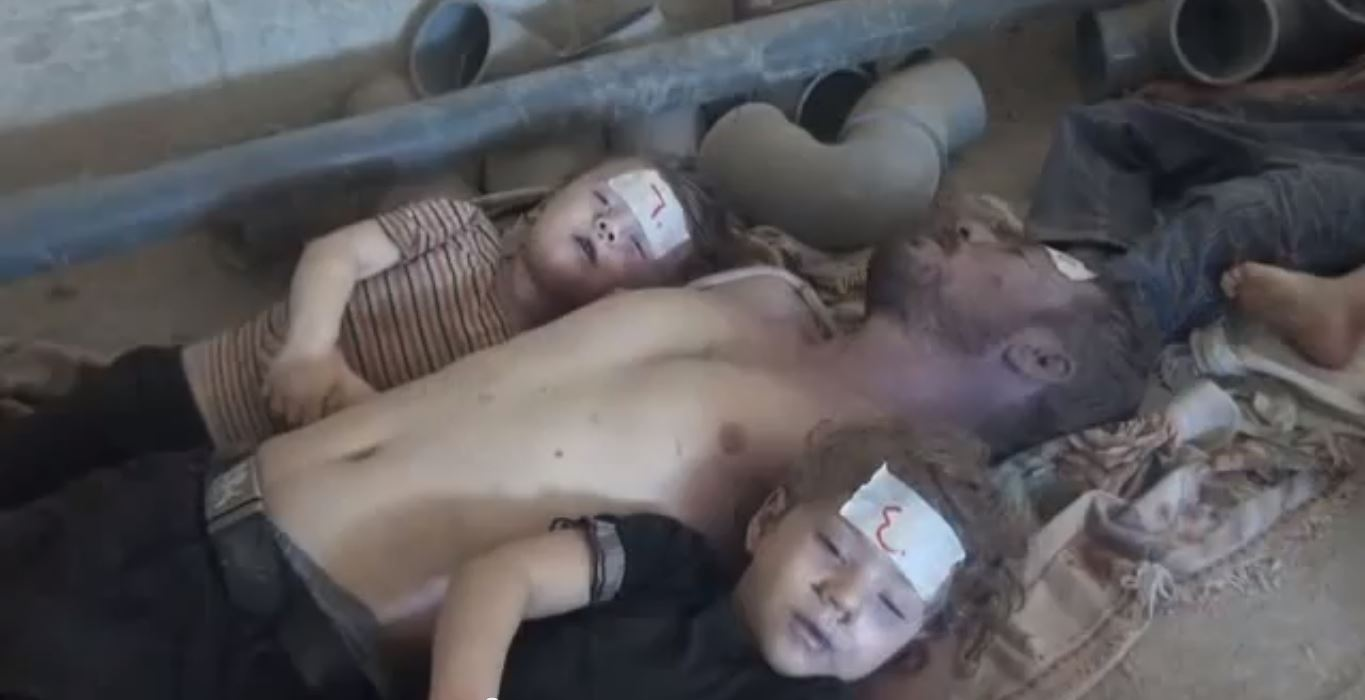
Victims of chemical weapon attack on civilians in Ghouta, an opposition held area.

The Ba'athist Syrian government has deployed chemical warfare as a systematic military strategy in the Syrian civil war, and is estimated to have committed over 300 chemical attacks, targeting civilian populations throughout the course of the conflict. As of 2023, at least nine separate investigations conducted by both the UN and the OPCW have concluded that the Assad government carried out several chemical weapons attacks. Investigation conducted by the GPPi research institute documented 336 confirmed attacks involving chemical weapons in Syria between 23 December 2012 and 18 January 2019. The study attributed 98% of the total verified chemical attacks to the Syrian Arab Armed Forces. Approximately 90% of all attacks had occurred after the Ghouta chemical attack in August 2013.

A UN fact-finding mission was established in March 2013 to investigate 16 alleged chemical weapons attacks. Seven of them were investigated (nine were dropped for lack of "sufficient or credible information") and in four cases the UN inspectors confirmed use of sarin gas. The final report was published in December 2013, finding that chemical weapons were likely used in five of the seven attacks investigated, and that sarin was likely used in four of the attacks. There was no finding on the likely perpetrators of the attacks, being outside the scope of the investigation.

On 21 August 2013, Syrian Arab Army struck two opposition-controlled areas in the Ghouta suburbs around Damascus with rockets containing the chemical agent sarin. Estimates of those killed in the Ghouta massacre range from 1,127 to 1,729. The attack was the deadliest use of chemical weapons since the Iran–Iraq War. Following an inspection by a UN investigation team confirmed "clear and convincing evidence" of the use of sarin delivered by surface-to-surface rockets, a 2014 report by the UN Human Rights Council found that "significant quantities of sarin were used in a well-planned indiscriminate attack targeting civilian-inhabited areas, causing mass casualties. The evidence available concerning the nature, quality and quantity of the agents used on 21 August indicated that the perpetrators likely had access to the chemical weapons stockpile of the Syrian military, as well as the expertise and equipment necessary to manipulate safely large amount of chemical agents." Based on the trajectories calculated by the UN mission, Human Rights Watch states that the missiles were launched from a large military base on Mount Qasioun which is home to the Syrian Republican Guard's 104th Brigade.

=== Attacks on medical personnel ===
"Anti-terrorism laws issued on 2 July 2012 effectively criminalized medical aid to the opposition. ... As a result, the health-care system was severely affected in the course of military operations carried out by government forces, as well as through a deliberate and systematic campaign to persecute medical staff treating anyone perceived to be opposing the Government. Hospitals and medical facilities have been systematically targeted, leading to the death and wounding of medical personnel. Across the country, between July 2014 and January 2015, at least 10 hospitals were attacked by government airstrikes, some repeatedly, often killing doctors and nurses working inside."

— Report of the Independent International Commission of Inquiry on the Syrian Arab Republic, 5 February 2015

According to the UN Independent International Commission of Inquiry medical personnel have been targeted during the civil war. According to Physicians for Human Rights, the Syrian government "responded to popular protests with months of sustained and extreme violence and intimidation, and an all-out assault on the country's medical system." The government denied "wounded civilians impartial medical treatment", invaded, attacked and misused hospitals, attacked and impeded medical transport, and detained and tortured doctors for treating wounded civilians, according to the group. In government-run hospitals pro-regime staff "routinely performed amputations for minor injuries, as a form of punishment", wounded protesters were taken from hospital wards by security and intelligence agents. Ambulances with wounded protesters were commandeered by security agents to go to facilities for interrogation and sometimes torture. In response medical personnel created secret medical units to treat injured. In 2019–2020 the UN Human Rights Council stated:

"In attacking medical facilities, pro-government forces repeatedly committed the war crime of deliberately attacking protected objects and intentionally attacking medical personnel."

— UN Human Rights Council, Report of the Independent International Commission of Inquiry on the Syrian Arab Republic

The New Yorker magazine cites the group stating that in the five years since the war started "the Syrian government has assassinated, bombed, and tortured to death almost seven hundred medical personnel." (Armed opposition groups and the Islamic State militant group, are estimated to have killed 27 personnel.)

Physician Annie Sparrows believes an explanation for the killing is that the Syrian government viewed doctors as dangerous, seeing their ability to heal rebel fighters and civilians in rebel-held areas as a "weapon" against the government. Over the 2.5 years, doctors, nurses, dentists, and pharmacists who provide medical care to civilians in contested areas have been arrested and detained; paramedics have been tortured and used as human shields, ambulances have been targeted by snipers and missiles; medical facilities have been destroyed; the pharmaceutical industry devastated. In 2011, there were more than 30,000 doctors in Syria. More than 16,000 doctors fled, and many of those left were in hiding. More than ninety were assassinated for doing their jobs and at least 36 paramedics, in uniform on authorized missions, were killed by Syrian military snipers or shot dead at checkpoints.

As of August 2016, more than 200 medical facilities had been attacked by the government and its allies since the start of the war, and according to The Economist, "Experts reckon that no previous war has witnessed such widespread, systematic targeting of hospitals and medical workers."

The 2019–2020 UN HRC report for the first time directly accused Russian Air Force of "indiscriminate attacks in civilian areas" in connection to bombing of refugee shelter in Haas and market place in Ma’arrat al-Nu’man in summer 2019, and described them as "amounting to the war crime".

=== Sexual violence ===
Men and women have been subjected to sexual violence by government forces.

"Several testimonies reported the practice of sexual torture used on male detainees. Men were routinely made to undress and remain naked. Several former detainees testified reported beatings of genitals, forced oral sex, electroshocks and cigarette burns to the anus in detention facilities . . . Several of the detainees were repeatedly threatened that they would be raped in front of their family and that their wives and daughters would also be raped. Testimonies were received from several men who stated they had been anally raped with batons and that they had witnessed the rape of boys. One man stated that he witnessed a 15-year-old boy being raped in front of his father. A 40-year-old man saw the rape of an 11-year-old boy by three security services officers."

Human Rights Watch reported these sexual crimes as being committed by Syrian government forces.

Syrian activists reported that women were abducted and raped by pro-Assad forces in opposition-held parts of the country, possibly using sexual violence as a means of quelling dissent. An opposition campaigner supplied The Globe and Mail with details about six previously unknown cases of violence against women, saying that more such incidents remain hidden as Damascus struggles to contain the uprising. Syrian refugees fleeing to Turkey reported mass rape by Syrian soldiers, more than 400 women were raped and sexually abused.

On 13 August 2012, a sergeant in the special forces who had defected claimed that Alawite officers ordered the rape of teenage girls in Homs, who would be shot afterwards. The defected sergeant further said that soldiers who refused were shot by the army

A report released 14 January 2013 by the International Rescue Committee stated that a primary reason Syrian refugees flee is because of fear of rape.

By late November 2013, according to the Euro-Mediterranean Human Rights Network (EMHRN) report entitled "Violence against Women, Bleeding Wound in the Syrian Conflict", approximately 6,000 women have been raped (including gang-rape) since the start of the conflict – with figures likely to be much higher given that most cases go unreported. According to the EMHRN report, most were victims of government forces mostly "during governmental raids, at checkpoints and within detention facilities" and many of the rapes resulted in pregnancies.

=== Ethnic cleansing ===
Eva Koulouriotis described Bashar al-Assad as the "master of ethnic cleansing in the 21st century". During the course of the civil war, Assad ordered depopulation campaigns throughout the country to re-shape its demography in favour of his government, and the military tactics have been compared to the persecutions of the Bosnian war. Between 2011 and 2015, Ba'athist militias are reported to have committed 49 ethno-sectarian massacres for the purpose of implementing its social engineering agenda in the country. Alawite loyalist militias known as the Shabiha have been launched into Sunni villages and towns; perpetrating numerous anti-Sunni massacres. These include the Houla, Bayda and Baniyas massacres, Al-Qubeir massacre, Al-Hasawiya massacre, etc. which have resulted in hundreds of deaths; with hundreds of thousands of residents fleeing under threats of persecution and sexual violence. Pogroms and deportations were pronounced in central Syrian regions and Alawite majority coastal areas, where the Syrian military and Hezbollah view as a priority to establish strategic control by expelling Sunni residents and bringing in Iran-backed Shia militants. In 2016, the United Nations criticized Bashar al-Assad for pursuing demographic engineering and ethnic cleansing in Darayya district in Damascus.

Syrian government forces have pursued mass-killings of civilian populations as part of its war-strategy throughout the conflict; and is responsible for inflicting more than 90% of the total civilian deaths in the Syrian civil war. Between 2011 and 2021, a minimum of 306,000 civilian deaths are estimated to have occurred by the UN. The crackdowns and extermination campaigns of the Assad government resulted in the Syrian refugee crisis; causing the forced displacement of 14 million Syrians, with around 7.2 million refugees. This made the Syrian refugee crisis the largest refugee crisis in the world; and UNHCR High Commissioner Filippo Grandi described it as "the biggest humanitarian and refugee crisis of our time and a continuing cause for suffering."

=== Child abductions ===
Navi Pillay, the United Nations High Commissioner for Human Rights, stated in March 2012 that Syrian military forces and Ba'athist paramilitaries were systemically abducting, detaining and torturing children. Suggesting that the UN Security Council should turn Bashar al-Assad over for prosecution in the International Criminal Court (ICC), Navi Pillay said: "They've gone for the children - for whatever purposes - in large numbers. Hundreds detained and tortured... it's just horrendous, ...Children shot in the knees, held together with adults in really inhumane conditions, denied medical treatment for their injuries, either held as hostages or as sources of information."

Since 2011, the Assad regime has arrested and detained children without trial until the age of 18, after which they were transferred to Ba'athist military field courts and killed. A 2024 investigative report by the Syrian Investigative Journalism Unit (SIRAJ) identified 24 Syrian children who were forcibly disappeared, had their assets confiscated, detained and later killed after they reached the age of 18. The report, based on inside sources within the Assad government, interviews with victims' families, and public sources, estimated that more than 6,000 detainees who reached the age of 18 were ordered to killed by two Ba'athist military field courts in the Seydnaya Prison and in al-Dimas town between 2014 and 2017, citing eyewitness accounts of an insider within the Ba'athist military police.

== Free Syrian Army and other armed opposition fighters ==
In 2012, the United Nations "Independent International Commission of Inquiry on the Syrian Arab Republic" reported that rebels had committed war crimes, but that they "did not reach the gravity, frequency and scale" of those by state forces. The Commission alleged that the armed opposition groups of: unlawful killing; torture and ill-treatment; kidnapping and hostage taking; and the use of children in dangerous non-combat roles—since December 2011. In 2012, Amnesty confirmed that Armed opposition fighters or jihadis were guilty of having tortured and executed captured soldiers and militiamen, as well as known or perceived civilian collaborators, and later condemned the opposition fighters responsible for an attack on a pro-Assad TV station in June 2012 in which media workers were killed. The Assad government's sectarian shabiha paramilitaries "have been responsible for a vast numbers of killings, which has made it more difficult for insurgents to resist the urge to act in reprisal."

=== Child soldiers ===
The use of child soldiers by Syrian rebels have been documented in Western media and NGOs through the course of the war."Radhika Coomaraswamy, the UN special representative for children and armed conflict, said in March 2012 that she had received claims that the Free Syrian Army was using children as fighters. A UN report in April 2012 also mentioned "credible allegations" that rebels, including the FSA, were using child fighters, despite stated FSA policy of not recruiting any child under the age of 17, but a later one in June 2012 made no mention of this, only reporting that opposition fighters were using children in non-combat roles. Still, in an interview to AP, one rebel commander stated that his 16-year-old son had died in clashes with government troops as a rebel fighter. He also confirmed that his group had been releasing prisoners in bomb-rigged cars turning drivers into unwitting suicide bombers.

The FSA was mentioned in a 2014 Human Rights Watch report detailing the widespread practice of using child soldiers by non-state armed groups, the report interviewed children as young as 14 who fought with the FSA. In 2014, the United Nations reported that the Free Syrian army had recruited more than 142 child soldiers. The UN reported stated "fragmentation of FSA resulted in localized and variable recruitment, training and salary practices. During armed battles, children were used for fighting, attending to the wounded or for recording events for propaganda purposes."

In 2016, the United Nations verified another 62 cases where Free Syrian Army had recruited and used child soldiers. A 2016 report by UNICEF found that "all parties to the conflict" were recruiting under age fighters.

On 30 June 2017, the military leaders of the 21st Combined Force, 23rd Division, Central Division and the 1st Coastal Division signed the Geneva Call Deed of Commitment.

=== Allegations of crimes against minorities ===
In April 2012, the Farouq Brigades was accused of collecting jizyah, or taxes imposed on non-Muslims living under Muslim rule, in Christian areas of Homs province. However, the group denied this and the Institute for the Study of War said that "the accusation is likely from the Assad regime". There were also reports that the group had expelled 90% of the Christian population of Homs City. However, Jesuits in Homs disputed the cause of the exodus, and said that Christians were not targeted specifically, but fled the city on their own initiative because of the ongoing conflict. According to interviews made by McClatchy Newspapers of refugees in Lebanon, there was no targeting of Christians because of their religion. Rather, a number of government-affiliated Christians were seized by the Farouq Brigades, which led to some Christians fleeing the area.

In 2014, the UN Commission of Inquiry reported that since July 2013 Jabhat Al-Nusra, at times in coordination with other armed groups, carried out a series of killings of Kurdish civilians in Al Youssoufiyah, Qamishli and Al-Asadia (Al-Hasakah). During a raid by ISIS, Jabhat Al-Nusra, the Islamic Front and FSA battalions, fighters killed a Kurdish Yazidi man in Al-Asadia who refused to convert to Islam.

During the Syrian Civil War, the Alawites have suffered as a result of their perceived loyalty to the Assad government, many fearing that a negative outcome for the government in the conflict would result in an existential threat to their community. In February 2014, Jund al-Aqsa captured the town of Ma'an and reportedly massacred more than 21 Alawite civilians, half of them women and children. On 12 May 2016, militants of the Al-Qaeda linked Al-Nusra Front and Ahrar al-Sham attacked and captured the Alawite village of Zara'a, Southern Hama Governorate. The Syrian Observatory for Human Rights said that civilians had been kidnapped. Some of the captured were pro-government troops.

=== Torture, kidnappings, executions & sexual violence ===
On 20 March 2012, Human Rights Watch issued an open letter to the opposition (including the FSA), accusing them of carrying out kidnappings, torture and executions, and calling on them to halt these unlawful practices.

On 22 May 2012, an FSA brigade was alleged by Syrian state media to have kidnapped 11 Lebanese pilgrims coming from Iran. Although the Lebanese government denied it, the kidnappers said four of them were killed in an airstrike by the Syrian Air Force and the rest were released unharmed.

On 20 July 2012, Iraq's deputy interior minister, Adnan al-Assadi, claimed that Iraqi border guards had witnessed the FSA take control of a border post, detain a Syrian Army lieutenant colonel, and then cut off his arms and legs before executing 22 Syrian soldiers.

In July 2012, the Daoud Battalion, operating in the Jabal Zawiya area, reportedly used captured soldiers in proxy bombings. This involved tying the captured soldier into a car loaded with explosives and forcing him to drive to an Army checkpoint, where the explosives would be remotely detonated.

The United Nations report on war crimes states that the FSA's execution of five Alawite soldiers in Latakia, post-July 2012, was a war crime. The report states, "In this instance, the FSA perpetrated the war crime of execution without due process."

In August 2012, witnesses reported rebels conducting a "trial by grave" in which an alleged government soldier was given a mock trial next to a pre-made grave and executed on the spot by members of the FSA Amr bin al-Aas Brigade. One rebel was quoted as saying: "We took him right to his grave and, after hearing the witnesses' statements, we shot him dead". In 2012/13, the FSA was accused of summarily executing numerous prisoners who it claimed were are government soldiers or shabiha, and people who it claims are informers. A rebel commander in Damascus said that over the months his unit had executed perhaps 150 people that the "military council" had found to be informers. He explained: "If a man is accused of being an informer, he is judged by the military council. Then he is either executed or released". Nadim Houry, a Middle East researcher for Human Rights Watch argued that "Intentionally killing anyone, even a shabiha, once he is outside of combat is a war crime, regardless of how horrible the person may have been". On 10 August 2012, a report indicated that Human Rights Watch was investigating rebel forces for such killings. The FSA, for its part, stated that they would put those fighters that had conducted the unlawful killings on trial.

On 13 August 2012, a series of three videos surfaced showing executions of prisoners, apparently by rebel forces, in Aleppo province. In one video, six postal workers were being thrown off the main postal building in Al-Bab to their deaths, purportedly by FSA fighters. The gunmen claimed they were shabiha. On 10 September 2012 the FSA's Hawks of Syria brigade reportedly executed more than 20 Syrian soldiers captured in Hanano military base.

In September 2012, the northern branch of the Farouq Brigades was accused of kidnapping and killing Abu Mohamad al-Absi, a Syrian Jihadist who led a group of foreign fighters. The local Farouq Brigade leader said the foreign fighters had ignored their demands to leave the Bab al-Hawa border post. He said that al-Absi had "raised the al-Qaeda flag, and al-Qaeda is not welcomed by us".

On 2 November 2012 the FSA's al-Siddiq Battalion kidnapped and executed prominent Syrian actor Mohammed Rafeh. It claimed he was a member of the shabiha and was carrying a gun and military ID.

In December 2012, militants abducted an NBC News Team of six journalists around NBC's chief foreign correspondent Richard Engel. Engel initially blamed pro-government Shabiha militants, but it turned out the perpetrators were most likely the FSA-affiliated rebel group North Idlib Falcons Brigade.

In May 2013, a video was posted on the internet appearing to show a rebel cutting organs from the dead body of a Syrian soldier and putting one in his mouth, "as if he is taking a bite out of it". He appears to call rebels to follow his example and terrorize the Alawite sect. Humans Rights Watch (HRW) confirmed the authenticity of the footage, and stated that "The mutilation of the bodies of enemies is a war crime". The rebel was Khalid al-Hamad, known by his nom de guerre "Abu Sakkar", a commander of the Independent Omar al-Farouq Brigade. The BBC described it as an offshoot of the FSA's Farouq Brigades, while HRW said it is "not known" whether the Brigade is part of the FSA. The incident was condemned by the FSA's Chief of Staff and the Syrian National Coalition said that Abu Sakkar would be put on trial. Abu Sakkar said the mutilation was revenge. He claimed to have found a video on the soldier's cellphone in which the soldier sexually abuses a woman and her two daughters, along with other videos of Assad loyalists raping, torturing, dismembering and killing people, including children. He further stated that if the war was to continue, "all Syrian people" would be like him. The FSA's Supreme Military Council called for Abu Sakkar's arrest, saying it wants him "dead or alive". He was reported killed in northwest Latakia province on 6 April 2016 by the Syrian Army, by then allegedly fighting with the al-Qaeda branch Al-Nusra Front. Other reports claimed that he was attacked by a rival opposition militia.

On 3 June 2014, the Army of Mujahideen announced the expulsion of 19th Division's Ansar Brigade and its leader, Abu Bakr, accusing them of theft and kidnapping.

On 30 June 2015, Jaysh al-Islam's website published a 20-minute video that showed its fighters executing 18 alleged IS militants by shotgun. The video mimics the imagery that IS used for similar filmed executions; however, it reversed the imagery by having the executioners wearing orange prisoner outfits and the victims being dressed in black robes. The video, which included some English subtitles, stated the killings were in revenge for recent beheadings of captured Jaysh al-Islam fighters by IS. It also showed a Jaysh al-Islam sharia official condemning IS as "Khawarij" (deviating from mainstream Islam).

In 2016, courts affiliated with the Levant Front were accused of summary killings by Amnesty International.

After their capture of the town of Jarabulus from IS in September 2016, Kurdish media reported that Sultan Murad Division fighters published pictures of themselves torturing four YPG members prisoners of war, who were captured by the rebel group while, according to YPG claims, trying to evacuate civilians. Two of the Sultan Murad Division fighters who had been involved in the torture of POWs were later captured and questioned by the Anti-Terror Units. On 10 January 2017, the Hawar News Agency claimed that the brigade had tortured a civilian from Tat Hims to death, releasing footage of his corpse.

Jaysh al-Nasr have taken mainly-Alawite civilians, including children, as prisoners. 112 of them were released from Qalaat al-Madiq on 7 February 2017 as part of a prisoner exchange.

In August 2018, a woman from Hama accused Mohammed al-Jassem, known as "Abu Amsha", leader of Suleyman-Shah Brigade of raping her. In June 2020, a 16-year-old Kurdish girl was found dead in al-Fayruziyah near Azaz, she was kidnapped on 23 May by Sultan Murad Division from Darwish near Sharran in Afrin District.

In December 2020, there were reports that detained women from Afrin were transferred to Libya by mercenaries.

=== Shelling of civilian areas ===
On 25 October 2013, the Sultan Murad Division shelled a monastery in Aleppo.

According to an Amnesty International report from May 2016, indiscriminate shelling of Sheikh Maqsoud by Islamist rebel groups, including the Sultan Murad Division, killed between February and April 2016 at least 83 civilians, including 30 children, and injured more than 700 civilians. Amnesty International's regional director suggested that these repeated indiscriminate attacks constitute war crimes. In April 2016, SDF officials alleged that some of their wounded fighters were displaying signs of chemical weapon injuries after being shelled by the Syrian opposition militia Jaysh al-Islam. Welat Memo, a physician with the Kurdish Red Crescent said that the people affected are "vomiting and having difficulty in breathing." Jaysh al-Islam subsequently clarified that one of its local commanders used "modified Grad rockets," not chemical weapons, and stated that the commander was disciplined.

Islamist rebel groups have multiple times shelled Sheikh Maqsood neighbourhood, causing destruction of property and injury and death of civilians. In May 2016, Amnesty International's regional director suggested that the attacks on Sheikh Maqsood constitute "war crimes". Between February and April 2016 more than 83 civilians were killed by the attacks. In mid-June 2016 the US-supported Syrian Democratic Forces (of which the YPG are a component) and Russia accused the rebel militias of causing the death of over 40 civilians in the month, and an accumulated 1,000 civilian deaths, through indiscriminate shelling of Sheikh Maqsood. It also reported their alleged use of chemical weapons. A United Nations report in February 2017 came to the conclusion that during the siege of Eastern Aleppo the joint operations room of Syrian rebel factions Fatah Halab, after vowing to take revenge on the Kurds in Sheikh Maqsoud, intentionally attacked civilian inhabited neighbourhoods of the Kurdish enclave, killing and maiming dozens of civilians, and that these acts constitute the war crime of directing attacks against a civilian population.

=== Acts against civilian activists ===
After Captain Al Qatahneh, the leader of the Southern Front's Omari Brigades, was killed in a gun battle with an opposition activist named Qaisar Habib on 28 August 2014, the activist, severely wounded and admitted to a hospital, was murdered on 19 October by Omari Brigades fighters.

In July 2016, in Aleppo, media activists accusing the Levant Front of corruption and otherwise criticizing the group have received threats and faced reprisal attacks.

In November 2016 in Tyrol, Austria, a former fighter of the Farouq Brigades was prosecuted for the summary execution of 20 wounded Syrian Army soldiers while in Homs between 2013 and 2014. In May 2017, he was found guilty and was sentenced to life imprisonment in Austria.

On 30 April 2017, Jaysh al-Islam fighters opened fire on demonstrators who called for an end to the rebel infighting. Between 26 April and 1 May, more than 95 rebels were killed during clashes between Jaysh al-Islam, Tahrir al-Sham, and the Rahman Legion. The clashes led to Syrian Army advances in eastern Damascus.

=== Use of captives as human shields ===
On 1 November 2015, an opposition media outlet, Shaam News Network, posted a video showing Jaysh al-Islam militants had locked people in cages and spread out 100 cages containing about 7 captives each through Eastern Ghouta, northeast of Damascus, to use them as human shields against Syrian government air raids. According to the Syrian Observatory for Human Rights, the caged people being used as human shields were captured Alawite military officers and their families who had been kidnapped by Jaish al-Islam two years ago outside Adra al-Ummaliyah, a government-held neighbourhood in Eastern Ghouta.

=== Other alleged war crimes ===
On 9 September 2012, the FSA reportedly exploded a car bomb near al-Hayat Hospital and the Central Hospital in Aleppo. According to Syrian state media, at least 30 people were killed and more than 64 wounded. The FSA claimed that the Army had occupied the hospital buildings and were using them as a base.

According to the Syrian Observatory for Human Rights, the 16th Division's Badr Martyrs Brigade, led by Khaled Hayani, was responsible for the deaths of more than 203 civilians, including 42 children, at least 25 women, and 136 men, with more than 900 wounded, 175 of them seriously, in the city of Aleppo between July and December 2014 with hell cannons and other mortars, in addition to improvised explosive devices.

On 2 August 2016, fighters from the Youth of Sunna Forces raided the house of its deputy leader Mohammad Tohme and proceeded beat his father and shot his brother.

Following the Operation Olive Branch, the Suleyman-Shah Brigade and other Turkmen militias were accused of demographic change by removing Kurds from their houses and settling Turkmens from other regions in Afrin and its countryside. In addition, the Hamza Division had their own prisons where Kurdish women were held captive there.

=== Response to some of the allegations ===
In May 2013, UN commission of inquiry commissioner Carla Del Ponte said there were "strong concrete suspicions but not yet incontrovertible proof" that rebels had used the nerve agent sarin. The following day, in an apparent reaction to Del Ponte's comments, the commission issued a press release clarifying that it "has not reached conclusive findings as to the use of chemical weapons in Syria by any parties in the conflict".

In a video uploaded to the Internet in early August 2013, an FSA representative announced that, in response to international concerns, FSA units would follow the Geneva Convention's guidelines for the treatment of prisoners and would guarantee its captives food, medical attention and holding areas away from combat zones. He also invited Red Cross workers to inspect their detention facilities. On 8 August, FSA commanders distributed an 11-point code of conduct signed by scores of brigade commanders and rebel leaders. It states that all fighters must "respect human rights ... our tolerant religious principles and international human rights law – the same human rights that we are struggling for today".

== Islamic State organization ==
In 2015, Human Rights Watch NGO alleged that the Islamist militant groups Jabhat al-Nusra and IS had committed "systematic rights abuses, including intentionally targeting and abducting civilians".

On 31 March, Human Rights Watch claimed that IS militants killed at least 35 civilians after they briefly seized the village of Mab`oujeh in Hama countryside. In a June 2015 attack on the northern Syrian city of Kobani, IS reportedly killed between 233 and 262 civilians deliberately. According to witnesses, the attackers killed civilians using several ways, including automatic weapons, machine guns and rifles. They also used grenades and snipers fired on civilians from rooftops as they tried to retrieve the dead. In other incident, witnesses told Human Rights Watch that IS execute people in public in the governorates of Raqqa and Deir al-Zor. The victims were shot, beheaded, crucified, or stoned to death depending on the charge.

In 2016, the Omari Brigades participated in the fight between the Syrian opposition and two Islamic State-affiliated groups, the Yarmouk Martyrs Brigade and the Islamic Muthanna Movement. On 1 April, IS attempted to assassinate Fares Adib al-Baydar, the former brigade leader.

== Syrian Democratic Forces ==
In June 2014, Human Rights Watch criticized the YPG for accepting minors into their ranks, picking up on multiple earlier reports of teenage fighters serving in the YPG, with a report by the United Nations Secretary General stating that at least 24 minors under age of 18 had been recruited by YPG. In response, the YPG and YPJ signed the Geneva Call Deed of Commitment protecting children in armed conflict, prohibiting sexual violence and against gender discrimination in July 2014, and Kurdish security forces (YPG and Asayish) began receiving human rights training from Geneva Call and other international organisations. Despite this however, the SDF was reported to be continuing the use of child soldiers, and in 2020, United Nations reported SDF as the largest faction in the Syrian civil war by the number recruited child soldiers with 283 child soldiers.

In June 2015 the Turkish government and Amnesty International reported that the YPG was carrying out an ethnic cleansing of non-Kurdish populations as part of a plan to join the Jazira and Euphrates regions into a single territory. The report makes accusations of looting, coercing civilians to join their armed forces and the forced targeted displacement of 1400 families in the Turkman villages of Hammam al-Turkman, 800 Turkmen from Mela Berho and Suluk residents.

On 15 March 2017, a video surfaced that showed members of a Syrian Democratic Forces component militia, the Northern Sun Battalion, torturing an IS fighter, who had been captured while planting mines. One of these mines had killed nine fighters of the battalion, leading five others to take revenge on the IS militant. The Manbij Military Council condemned the act, and announced that the involved Northern Sun Battalion fighters would be held for trial for violating the Geneva Conventions. The five accused were subsequently arrested on 17 March.

== Violations by various or unknown parties ==
=== Violations of free speech and attacks on media and journalists ===
Except for those hand-picked by the government, journalists have been banned from reporting in Syria. Those who have entered the country regardless have been targeted. Within a month of the protests taking off, at least seven local and international journalists were detained, and at least one of these was beaten. Citizen journalist Mohammed Hairiri was arrested in April 2012, tortured in prison, and sentenced to death in May 2012 for giving an interview for Al Jazeera. Palestinian of Jordanian citizen Salameh Kaileh was tortured and detained in deplorable conditions before being deported.

According to the Committee to Protect Journalists, 13 journalists were killed in work-related incidents during the first eighteen months of the uprising. During the same period, Reporters Without Borders said a total of 33 journalists were killed. Many, such as Marie Colvin, were killed by government forces, but at least one, French journalist Gilles Jacquier, was killed by rebel fire.

The Committee to Protect Journalists reports that as of June 2016, 95 journalists have been killed in Syria since 2011. In late 2013 the Associated Press reported that 30 journalists—half of them foreign reporters, half of them Syrian—have been kidnapped or gone missing in Syria since Syria's civil war began in early 2011. According to AP, "Jihadi groups are believed responsible for most kidnappings" from Summer 2013 to November, but "government-backed militias, criminal gangs and rebels affiliated with the Western-backed Free Syrian Army" also have been involved with various motives. The Atlantic blamed the kidnappings on chaos and extremist armed opposition groups motivated by a "combination" of criminality and jihadism, and credited the abductions with "bringing on-the-ground coverage" of the civil war to a halt. According to the Committee to Protect Journalists, the "Islamic State" group is responsible for killing "at least 27 journalists since 2013, with at least 11 others missing and feared dead". The group also credits 59% of killings of journalists in Syria to the government, military or paramilitary groups.

International media and journalists operate with few restrictions in the Democratic Federation of Northern Syria, the only region in Syria where they can operate freely.

=== Attacks on local Christians ===
Local Christian minorities are also facing many human rights violations. Two bishops had been kidnapped on 22 April 2013 and have not been heard from since. Aleppo's Greek Orthodox bishop Boulos Yazij and Syriac Orthodox bishop Yohanna Ibrahim were kidnapped at gun point by unknown combatants when returning from a humanitarian mission to Turkey. During the kidnapping, the deacon driving them was shot and killed. "One month after two Orthodox Christian bishops were kidnapped by gunmen in Syria, officials say they still have no idea what has happened to the missing prelates".

== Violations by foreign state actors ==
=== US-led coalition ===
The Syrian Network for Human Rights reported that 2,286 civilian deaths were caused by US-led coalition airstrikes fighting IS since the beginning of the campaign until September 2017, raising concerns, including from Human Rights Watch, that the coalition failed to take necessary precautions to minimize civilian casualties.

=== Turkey ===
Next to giving material support to parties in the Syrian Civil War – to the Islamic State (IS) organization as well as to other Islamist rebel groups – who would fight the Democratic Federation of Northern Syria, Turkish forces shelled population centers in northern Syria, causing property damage but also injury and death of civilians. Turkey was accused of actively supporting the indiscriminate shelling of civilian population centers by opposition militias, causing 1,000 civilian deaths in the Sheikh Maqsood neighbourhood of Aleppo alone.

Frequently accusations are made from local sources as well as Democratic Federation of Northern Syria authorities against Turkish border guards shooting to kill at civilians at the border. In one of the most prominent of such accusations, a report from ANF on 28 September 2016 alleged that "Turkish soldiers kill 17 civilians on Rojava border in two days", building on a report of the Syrian Observatory for Human Rights from the previous day of 12 civilians killed. Concerning one of the events in these two days, SANA reported that "local sources told SANA reporter in Hasaka that the Turkish army opened fire on a number of civilians at Kahyla village which is located between the cities of Ras al-Ayn and Tal Abyad, killing nine civilians including children, and injuring others. Some of the injured persons, who were rushed to Ras al-Ayn city for treatment, confirmed that Turkish soldiers fired indiscriminately at them."

In October 2016, the co-chairman of the Democratic Federation of Northern Syria's leading Democratic Union Party (PYD), Salih Muslim, accused Turkey of ethnic cleansing in the border area between Azaz and Jarabulus which at the time is occupied by Turkish-backed opposition rebels, saying that it had driven thousands of Kurds from their land in villages near the border.

A report of the Independent International Commission of Inquiry, published in 2020, reminded Turkey of its responsibility to protect the human rights of civilians in Syrian areas under its control. It noted allegations that Turkish forces were aware of incidents of looting and torture of detainees conducted by the Syrian National Army.

On 18 January 2025, a drone struck an ambulance belonging to the Kurdish Red Crescent as it was transporting a civilian injured in an earlier attack on protesters near the Tishrin Dam. Human Rights Watch interviewed witnesses and the ambulance driver, who said that the vehicle was clearly marked. The organisation described the strike as an apparent war crime and attributed it to the Türkiye–Syrian National Army coalition. However, it was unable to establish whether the drone had been operated by Turkish forces or the Syrian National Army.

=== Russia ===
Russia was alleged to be responsible for multiple war crimes and human rights violations during the war. This includes the targeting of hospitals and rescue workers, extensive use of cluster munitions in violation of United Nations resolution 2139 of 22 February 2014, use of white phosphorus against targets in Raqqa and Idlib, causing civilian casualties with the weapons, and air strikes on densely populated civilian areas. Russia along with various pro-Iranian Shia militant groups, committed war crimes against the Sunni majority population during the battle of Aleppo between 2012 and 2016. Children were among the hardest hit, as pro-Assad forces used indiscriminate bombings and starvation as a method to force families and opposition groups out of the city. Since the beginning of the Syrian Civil War, pro-Assad and Russian forces targeted populated civilian areas, using starvation as a method of warfare to collectively punish the population.

A 2020 report by UN Human Rights Council for the first time directly laid responsibility on Russian Air Force of indiscriminate attacks on civilian targets "amounting to a war crime".

== Prosecution of Syrian civil war criminals ==
=== Swedish War Crimes Trial ===
In 2017, a Swedish court convicted former Syrian soldier Muhammad Abdullah of war crimes committed during the Syrian war and sentenced him to eight months in prison. Abdullah had reportedly moved to Sweden three years previously, and was identified by other Syrian refugees after posting an image on Facebook showing him with his boot on a corpse, smiling. Prosecutors failed to prove that he killed the person depicted, but convicted him of "violating human dignity" in what The New York Times described as a "landmark verdict".

=== The Al-Khatib Trial ===
On 14 February 2021, Eyad Al-Gharib, a former Syrian intelligence officer, was convicted by the Higher Regional Court of Koblenz, Germany of assisting the torture of prisoners under the process of Universal Jurisdiction. The Al-Khatib trial was a landmark trial in that it was the first time an official of the Assad government was openly implicated for a Crime Against Humanity. Many human rights activists hoped this would be the beginning of securing accountability for the Syrian government's systemic usage of torture against civilians. The case stemmed from a series of joint complaints filed in 2015 in Germany, Austria, Sweden, and Norway by Syrian survivors, activists, and lawyers. Al-Gharib was accused of being a part of a police unit that arrested civilians following anti-government protests in the city of Douma and took them to the detention center known as Al-Khatib, Branch 252, where they were subjected to torture. Al-Gharib was convicted of accessory to crimes against humanity and sentenced to four and a half years in prison. He had come to Germany seeking asylum in 2018 after defecting from his position as a sergeant major in the Assad armed forces and was arrested a year later by German police.

Al-Gharib went on trial in April 2020 with a senior Syrian ex-official, Anwar Raslan, who was accused of overseeing the torture of detainees at the Al-Khatib prison. Syrian filmmaker and former detainee Feras Fayyad was the first witness to testify in the proceedings, providing testimony about his detention, torture, and sexual assault in Branch 251, which was used by prosecutors to substantiate the charges against Raslan. Al Gharib had testified against Raslan during his pretrial police interrogation and implicated the ex-official in more than 10 deaths of prisoners. On 13 January 2022, Raslan was sentenced by the state court in Koblenz to imprisonment for life "for a crime against humanity in the form of killing, torture, severe deprivation of liberty, rape and sexual coercion in unity of action with 27 counts of Mord, 25 counts of dangerous bodily harm, two counts of especially serious rape, sexual coercion, 14 counts of deprivation of liberty for more than one week, two counts of hostage-taking and three counts of sexual abuse of prisoners." In August 2024, the German Federal Court of Justice rejected Raslan’s appeal, making the sentence final.

== See also ==
- Human rights in Syria
- Human rights in Islamic State-controlled territory
- Human rights in Rojava
- Assassination of Syrian professors
