= Tahuna =

Tahuna may refer to the following places:

== New Zealand ==
- Tahuna, Otago, a suburb of Dunedin
- Tahuna, Waikato
- Queenstown, New Zealand (Māori: Tāhuna)
- Tāhunanui, a suburb of Nelson sometimes referred to as Tahuna

== Elsewhere ==
- Tahuna, North Sulawesi, Indonesia
  - Tahuna F.C., a football club

== See also ==
- Tahuneh (disambiguation)
