= Tahunat al-Halawa =

Tahunet Elhalawa طاحونة الحلاوة
- Village
- Location in Syria
- Coordinates: 35.388056°N 36.2525°E
- Country: Syria
- Governorate: Hama
- District: Al-Suqaylabiyah District
- Subdistrict: Al-Suqaylabiyah Nahiyah

Population (2004)
  - Total: 1,049
- Time zone: UTC+3 (AST)
- City Qrya Pcode: C3124

Tahunet Elhalawa (Arabic: طاحونة الحلاوة) is a Syrian village located in Al-Suqaylabiyah Nahiyah in Al-Suqaylabiyah District, Hama. According to the Syria Central Bureau of Statistics (CBS), Tahunet Elhalawa had a population of 1,049 in the 2004 census.
