= Bandar-e Tauneh =

Bandar-e Tahooneh بندر طاحونه
- village
- Bandar-e Tahooneh
- Location within Iran
- Coordinates: 26°42′28″N 54°12′14″E
- Country: Iran
- Province: Hormozgan
- County: Bandar Lengeh
- Bakhsh: Shibkaveh
- Rural District: Bandar Charak

Population (2006)
  - Total: 205
- Time zone: UTC+3:30 (IRST)
  - Summer (DST): UTC+4:30 (IRDT)

Bandar-e Tahooneh (Persian: بندر طاحونه, is a village in Bandar Charak Rural District, Shibkaveh District, Bandar Lengeh County, Hormozgan Province, Iran. At the 2006 census, its population was 205, in 36 families.
