= Salhab District =

Salhab District, within Hama Governorate.

Salhab District (Arabic: منطقة سلحب) is a district (mantiqah) administratively belonging to Hama Governorate, Syria. Its administrative centre is the city of Salhab, the district includes part of al-Ghab plain.

== Sub-districts ==
- Salhab Subdistrict (ناحية مركز سلحب): population 38,783.
- Jubb Ramlah Subdistrict (ناحية جب رملة): population 39,814.
- Ain al-Krum Subdistrict (ناحية عين الكروم) population 14,000.
