= Assassination of Syrian professors =

Since the start of the Syrian conflict in 2011, there have been reports of targeted assassinations of Syrian academics. Both sides of the dispute, government and opposition, have accused one another for these deaths. Among them are doctors, engineers, and university professors. Many of the professors had diverse origins and represented different parts of Syrian society, with a significant number being Alawite, Christian, and Shiite. The underlying reason for the murder is uncertain.

On 18 April 2011, Issa Abboud was killed in Homs' Nuzha area in a mysterious manner.

On 26 September 2011, Hassan Eid, a surgeon at Homs National Hospital, was killed. The next day, Mohamed Ali Aqil, deputy rector of the architecture faculty at Al-Baath University, and Nael Dakhil, director of the military petrochemical school were also murdered.

On 28 September 2011, the engineer and university professor, Aws Khalil, was shot in the head by an "armed terrorist group" in Homs, according to the government-run SANA.

An armed group assassinated the "mastermind" of the Syrian missile program, Nabil Zughaib, along with his family members in Bab Tuma on 22 July 2012.

On 1 June 2025, an Alawite university professor was assassinated in Aleppo while driving his vehicle, having been targeted by an unidentified individual on a motorcycle. Following the attack, the driver lost control of the vehicle, resulting in a collision with multiple other cars.

== See also ==
- Assassinations of Iranian nuclear scientists
