= Tadamon massacre =

2013 massacre in Tadamon, Damascus, Syria

- Part of the Syrian civil war
- Syrian soldier Amjad Youssef executing a civilian during the massacre
- Location: Tadamon, Damascus, Syria
- Date: 16 April 2013; 13 years ago
- Attack type: Massacre, mass shooting and mass burial
- Deaths: 288–300+
- Perpetrator: Ba'athist Syria

The Tadamon massacre (Arabic: مجزرة حي التضامن) took place in the vicinity of the Othman Mosque in the Tadamon neighbourhood of the Syrian capital of Damascus, on 16 April 2013 during the Syrian civil war. Soldiers affiliated with the Syrian Arab Armed Forces, specifically Branch 227 (Damascus branch) of the Military Intelligence Directorate, killed more than 288 civilians during the massacre.

One of the videos filmed by the perpetrators was later leaked, showing the killing of 41 civilians. Victims were taken to one of the isolated neighborhoods of Damascus and executed one after the other in a mass grave that had been prepared in advance. Ba'athist Syrian intelligence officer Major Amjad Youssef (Arabic: أمجد يوسف) was filmed committing the massacre. In the leaked video, Amjad was shown personally murdering 41 civilians.

It was first reported in an investigation published in English by the American New Lines Magazine in coordination with Syrian Media collective Al Jumhuriya, in Arabic, and in a report covering the investigation by the British newspaper The Guardian. Amjad Youssef, one of the chief perpetrators of the massacre, was arrested in late April 2026. Syrian Interior Minister Anas Khattab announced that Amjad was captured during a security operation carried out by the Syrian transitional government.

== Background ==
The massacre took place when rebel factions were preparing to enter the capital, Damascus, and start the battle to overthrow the regime. At that time, the Syrian regime forces controlled two-thirds of the Al-Tadamon neighborhood, while the opposition controlled the rest of the neighborhood. The massacre took place in the southeastern part of the neighborhood, specifically in an area that was close to the line of contact with the opposition on Daaboul Street, opposite the Othman Mosque.

== Massacre ==
The massacre took place on 16 April 2013, when soldiers affiliated with the Ba'athist Syrian regime killed 288 civilians near the Othman Mosque in the Tadamon neighborhood, by throwing them into a hole prepared in advance in the middle of an uninhabited street. After they finished shooting the victims one by one, the regime soldiers set the bodies of the victims on fire by burning tires that had been previously placed at the bottom of the pit. The massacre took place in one day, and the Ba'athist Syrian soldiers filmed the details of the murders. During the mass-killings, the victims' eyes were blindfolded with either duct tape or plastic wrap, and their hands were tied with a plastic strap usually used to collect and fix electrical cables.

== Leaked footage and investigation ==
Footage of the executions was leaked onto the internet in April 2022, showing two men dressed in Syrian Army uniforms leading men to an already dug pit in a street, shortly before shooting them one at a time and then leaving the bodies in the pit. On 27 April 2022, the British newspaper The Guardian published a lengthy investigation describing the details of the massacre and several excerpts from the recording. The perpetrators were identified, following an investigation, as warrant-officer Amjad Youssef and NDF militiaman Najib al-Halabi, who himself was killed later in the war. During the video of the massacre one of the soldiers carrying out the executions addresses the camera lens, addressing his boss in the Syrian dialect, saying, "For your sake, boss, and for the sake of the olive-green suit you wear." Amjad joined the Military Intelligence School located in the Maysaloun area in the Dimas suburb of Damascus in 2004, where he spent nine months of intensive training. In 2011 he joined Branch 227 of the Syrian Military Intelligence, notorious for being responsible for the arrest, torture and killing of a number of political opponents of the regime.

Following his identification, Youssef was arrested by the Syrian government. According to the Syrian Network for Human Rights, his arrest was performed without warrant and he was not presented to a court. The Network alleged that the arrest was to prevent the identification of regime figures involved in the massacre.

In August 2022, the Syrian Foreign Ministry dismissed the videos of the massacre as fabricated.

The United States government placed sanctions on Youssef in March 2023. Secretary of State Antony Blinken issued a statement in which he referred to the massacre at Tadamon as the reason for the sanctions.

== Investigations ==
=== Human Rights Watch report ===
After the fall of the Assad regime in December 2024, Human Rights Watch visited the site of the massacre and talked to witnesses. It concluded the Assad regime perpetrated summary killings, arbitrary arrests, indiscriminate attacks, and starvation to forcibly displace residents of this area.

=== Arrests ===
On 17 February 2025, Syrian security forces of the new transitional government arrested three former Assad regime officers for the massacre.

On 24 April 2026, Syrian Interior Minister Anas Khattab announced via X that Amjad Youssef, one of the main perpetrators of the massacre, had been apprehended in a security operation in the Ghab Plain area of rural Hama.

On 25 April 2026, the Syrian Ministry of Interior released Youssef's alleged confession to participating in the massacre. In it, Youssef claimed full responsibility for the whole Tadamon massacre, in an apparent attempt to protect others involved, including superior officers.

== See also ==
- Atarib market massacre
- Hass refugee camp bombing
- Kamuna refugee camp massacre
- War crimes in the Syrian civil war
