= Tadamon, Syria =

Tadamon التضامن
- Neighbourhood
- Location within Damascus Location within Syria
- Coordinates: 33°28′40″N 36°18′34″E
- Country: Syria
- Governorate: Damascus Governorate
- Subdistrict: Damascus
- Municipality: Al-Midan
- Established: 1960s

Government
  - Mayor: Ahmed Iskandar

Population (2004)
  - Total: 86,793

Tadamon (Arabic: التضامن, romanized: at-Taḍāmun; also spelled Tadamoun or Tadamun) is a neighborhood and district of the al-Midan municipality of Damascus, Syria. The neighborhood has been active in the Syrian civil war.

== History ==
Until the 1960s, the area of Tadamon was largely covered by orchards. However, the area began to be populated by Syrians who had fled the Golan Heights after Israel occupied that region in the 1967 Six Day War. The area also saw an influx of Syrians moving in from the countryside of Damascus. Most of the people who moved to Tadamon built their homes without government permits and the area has since developed as an informal neighborhood where roughly 90% of homes lack formally registered property deeds.

During the Syrian Civil War, in 2012, most of Tadamon was overrun by rebels fighting under the banner of the Free Syrian Army (FSA). In 2013, the area was the site of the Tadamon massacre, where 280+ people were executed by Syrian Military Intelligence personnel. In 2015, the Islamic State of Iraq and the Levant (ISIL), took over part of the district from the FSA. Government forces reasserted complete control of Tadamon in a military offensive in 2018.

== Population ==
According to the Syria Central Bureau of Statistics, Tadamon had a population of 86,793 in the 2004 census. According to Agence France-Presse, Tadamon had a pre-war population of 250,000 but most of the inhabitants fled the area during war. As of late 2018, the population of the district is around 65,000.
