= Salhab Subdistrict =

Salhab Subdistrict ناحية مركز سلحب
- Subdistrict (nahiyah)
- Location in Hama Governorate

- Location in Syria
- Country: Syria
- Governorate: Hama
- District: Salhab District
- Capital: Tell Salhab

Population (2004)
  - Total: 38,783
- Time zone: UTC+2 (EET)
  - Summer (DST): UTC+3 (EEST)
- Nahya pcod: SY050600

Salhab Subdistrict (Arabic: ناحية سلحب) is a Syrian nahiyah (subdistrict) located in Salhab District in Hama. According to the Syria Central Bureau of Statistics (CBS), Salhab Subdistrict had a population of 38,783 in the 2004 census.
