= Qalaat al-Madiq Subdistrict =

Qalaat al-Madiq Subdistrict ناحية قلعة المضيق
- Subdistrict (nahiyah)
- Location in Hama Governorate

- Location in Syria
- Coordinates: 35.4883°N 36.3917°E
- Country: Syria
- Governorate: Hama
- District: Al-Suqaylabiyah District
- Capital: Qalaat al-Madiq

Population (2004)
  - Total: 85,597
- Time zone: UTC+2 (EET)
  - Summer (DST): UTC+3 (EEST)
- Nahya pcod: SY050204

Qalaat al-Madiq Subdistrict (Arabic: ناحية قلعة المضيق) is a Syrian nahiyah (subdistrict) located in al-Suqaylabiyah District in Hama. According to the Syria Central Bureau of Statistics (CBS), Qalaat al-Madiq Subdistrict had a population of 85,597 in the 2004 census.
