= Al-Suqaylabiyah Subdistrict =

Al-Suqaylabiyah Subdistrict ناحية مركز السقيلبية
- Subdistrict (nahiyah)
- Location in Hama Governorate

- Location in Syria
- Coordinates: 35.3669°N 36.3436°E
- Country: Syria
- Governorate: Hama
- District: Al-Suqaylabiyah District
- Capital: Al-Suqaylabiyah

Population (2004)
  - Total: 49,686
- Time zone: UTC+2 (EET)
  - Summer (DST): UTC+3 (EEST)
- Nahya pcod: SY050200

Al-Suqaylabiyah Subdistrict (Arabic: ناحية مركز السقيلبية) is a Syrian nahiyah (subdistrict) located in al-Suqaylabiyah District in Hama. According to the Syria Central Bureau of Statistics (CBS), al-Suqaylabiyah Subdistrict had a population of 49,686 in the 2004 census.
