= Al-Suqaylabiyah District =

District of Hama, Syria

Ar-Suqaylabiyah District
- District
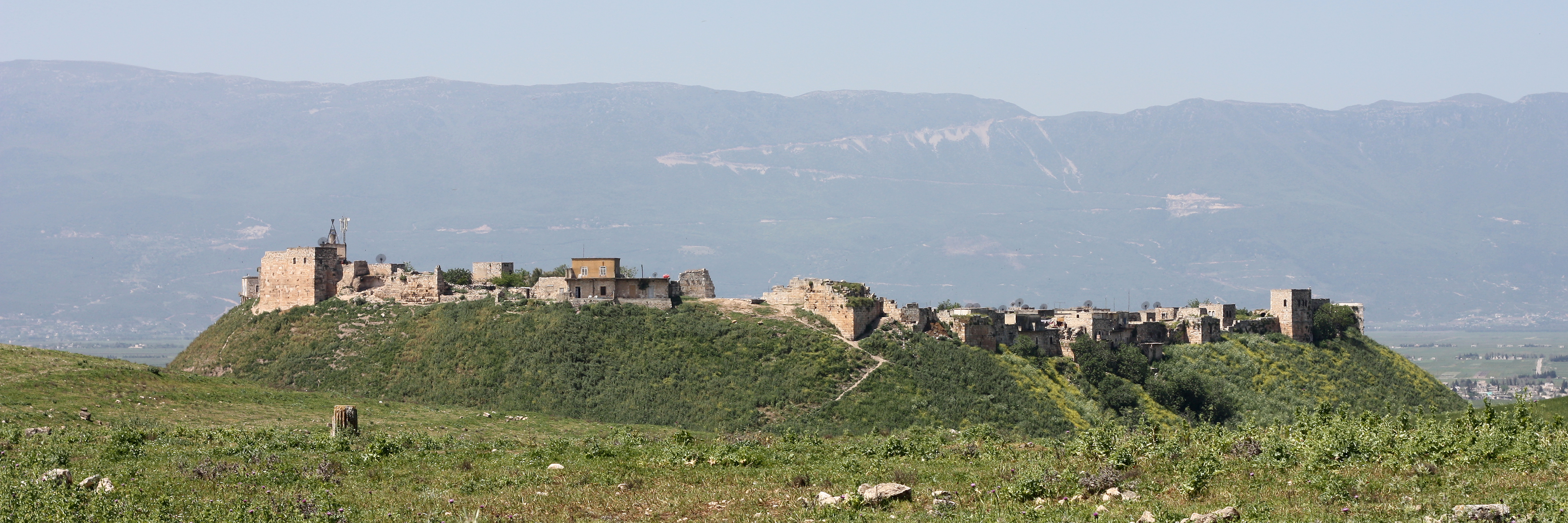
- Town of Qalaat al-Madiq

- Map of Ar-Suqaylabiyah District within Hama Governorate
- Coordinates (Al-Suqaylabiyah): 35.369722°N 36.38°E
- Country: Syria
- Governorate: Hama
- Seat: Al-Suqaylabiyah
- Subdistricts: 5 nawāḥī

Population (2004)
  - Total: 238,211

Al-Suqaylabiyah District (Arabic: السقيلبية As Suqailabiya) is a district (mantiqah) in Hama Governorate, Syria. According to the 2004 census, the district had a population of 238,211. The district is divided into five sub-districts (nawāḥī).

== Geography ==
Al-Suqaylabiyah District is one of the six administrative districts (manṭiqat) of Hama Governorate, Syria. (Note: Sources state the five districts of Hama Governorate as Al-Suqaylabiyah, Hama, Masyaf, Maharda, and Salamiyah. Salhab District was established by a presidential decree in 2024.) Al-Suqaylabiyah District is divided into five sub-districts (nawāḥī)–Al-Suqaylabiyah (السقيلبية), Salhab (سلحب), Al-Ziyarah (الزيارة), Shathah (شطحة), and Qalaat al-Madiq (ناحية قلعة).

== Demographics ==
According to the 2004 census, the district had a population of 238,211, comprising 121,621 males and 116,590 females. The census recorded 40,073 households, with an average household size of 6.0 people. The illiteracy rate was 12.9% among males and 32.3% among females. About 47.0% of the population were recorded as engaged in paid work, 17.5% were self-employed and 28.9% worked without pay. Approximately 90.3% of the households were own houses.

According to the 2004 census, 49,686 inhabitants were recorded in Al-Suqaylabiyah sub-district, 38,783 in Tell Salhab, 38,872 in Al-Ziyarah, 25,273 in Shathah and 85,597 in Qalaat al-Madiq. The United Nations Office for the Coordination of Humanitarian Affairs (OCHA) estimated the population in 2021 as 40,006 in Al-Suqaylabiyah sub-district, 5,825 in Qalaat al-Madiq, 15,399 in Shathah, 17,135 in Tell Salhib and 2,103 in Al-Ziyarah. According to OCHA's 2024 report, Al-Suqaylabiyah sub-district had an estimated population of 40,631, comprising 33,410 residents, 6,633 internally displaced people (IDP) and 576 IDP returnees. Qalaat al-Madiq had an estimated population of 9,110, Shathah 15,435, Tell Salhib 17,170 and Al-Ziyarah 4,699. Tell Salhib and Al-Ziyarah had 100 and 1,097 IDPs respectively.

== Syrian civil war ==
The town of Al-Suqaylabiyah has a Christian majority population, compared to other towns in the district where majority of the population followed Sunni Islam. During the Syrian civil war, Al-Suqaylabiyah was under the control of the Syrian government forces, and pro-government militias, who used it as a base to attack the opposition-held towns in the rural parts of the Homa Governance. Though there were minor conflicts, despite being under different authorities and the religious divide, residents of Al-Suqaylabiyah continued to engage in trade with the neighbouring town of Qalaat al-Madiq. However, the violence escalated after the fall of the Bashar al-Assad-led government in December 2024, with attacks on Al-Suqaylabiyah by the residents of Qalaat al-Madiq.
