= List of shopping malls in India =

This is a list of shopping malls in India, sortable by name, location, year opened and gross leasable area.

== Largest malls ==
| Name | Location | Year | Size (Total area) | Source |
|---|---|---|---|---|
| Sarath City Capital Mall | Hyderabad | 2018 | 2,700,000 sq ft (250,000 m^{2}) | |
| Lulu Mall Thiruvananthapuram | Thiruvananthapuram | 2021 | 2,200,003 sq ft (204,387.0 m^{2}) | |
| Lulu Mall Kochi | Kochi | 2013 | 2,000,000 sq ft (190,000 m^{2}) | |
| Lulu Mall Lucknow | Lucknow | 2022 | 2,000,000 sq ft (190,000 m^{2}) | |
| DLF Mall of India | Noida | 2016 | 2,000,000 sq ft (190,000 m^{2}) | |
| Ambience Mall Gurgaon | Gurgaon | 2007 | 1,800,000 sq ft (170,000 m^{2}) | |
| Inorbit Visakhapatnam | Visakhapatnam | 2026 | 1,400,000 sq ft (130,000 m^{2}) | |
| DB City Mall, Bhopal | Bhopal | 2010 | 1,300,000 sq ft (120,000 m^{2}) | |
| World Trade Park, Jaipur | Jaipur | 2012 | 1,300,000 sq ft (120,000 m^{2}) | |
| Hilite Mall, Kozhikode | Kozhikode | 2015 | 1,260,000 sq ft (117,000 m^{2}) | |
| Sky City Mall | Mumbai | 2025 | 1,207,000 sq ft (112,100 m^{2}) | |
| Amanora Mall, Hadapsar | Pune | 2008 | 1,200,000 sq ft (110,000 m^{2}) | |
| Ambience Mall, Vasant Kunj | Delhi | 2008 | 1,200,000 sq ft (110,000 m^{2}) | |
| Phoenix Mall of Asia | Bengaluru | 2023 | 1,200,000 sq ft (110,000 m^{2}) | |
| R City Mall | Mumbai | 2009 | 1,200,000 sq ft (110,000 m^{2}) | |
| Phoenix Marketcity | Pune | 2011 | 1,190,000 sq ft (111,000 m^{2}) | |
| Nexus Elante Mall | Chandigarh | 2013 | 1,150,000 sq ft (107,000 m^{2}) | |
| Phoenix Marketcity | Mumbai | 2011 | 1,140,000 sq ft (106,000 m^{2}) | |
| Texvalley | Erode | 2014 | 1,130,000 sq ft (105,000 m^{2}) | |
| Phoenix Mall of the Millennium | Pimpri-Chinchwad | 2023 | 1,100,000 sq ft (100,000 m^{2}) | |
| Phoenix Palladium | Mumbai | 1996 | 1,100,000 sq ft (100,000 m^{2}) | |
| Forum Mall Kochi | Kochi | 2023 | 1,060,000 sq ft (98,000 m^{2}) | |
| Magneto The Mall | Raipur | 2010 | 1,035,000 sq ft (96,200 m^{2}) | |
| Forum South Bengaluru | Bengaluru | 2022 | 1,000,000 sq ft (93,000 m^{2}) | |
| Mantri Square | Bengaluru | 2010 | 1,000,000 sq ft (93,000 m^{2}) | |
| Phoenix Citadel Mall | Indore | 2022 | 1,000,000 sq ft (93,000 m^{2}) | |
| Phoenix Marketcity | Bengaluru | 2011 | 1,000,000 sq ft (93,000 m^{2}) | |
| Phoenix Marketcity | Chennai | 2013 | 1,000,000 sq ft (93,000 m^{2}) | |
| South City Mall | Kolkata | 2008 | 1,000,000 sq ft (93,000 m^{2}) | |
| The Great India Place | Noida | 2007 | 1,000,000 sq ft (93,000 m^{2}) | |
| Lake Shore Thane | Thane | 2013 | 1,000,000 sq ft (93,000 m^{2}) | |
| VR Ambarsar (formerly Trilium Mall) | Amritsar | 2013 | 1,000,000 sq ft (93,000 m^{2}) | |
| VR Chennai | Chennai | 2018 | 1,000,000 sq ft (93,000 m^{2}) | |
| VR Punjab (formerly North Country Mall) | Mohali | 2012 | 1,000,000 sq ft (93,000 m^{2}) | |
| Nexus Seawoods | Navi Mumbai | 2017 | 971,742 sq ft (90,277.8 m^{2}) | |
| Nexus Esplanade | Bhubaneswar | 2018 | 950,000 sq ft (88,000 m^{2}) | |
| The Grand Venice Mall | Greater Noida | 2015 | 947,000 sq ft (88,000 m^{2}) | |
| Nashik City Centre | Nashik | 2009 | 900,000 sq ft (84,000 m^{2}) | |
| Express Avenue | Chennai | 2010 | 900,000 sq ft (84,000 m^{2}) | |
| Phoenix Palassio | Lucknow | 2020 | 900,000 sq ft (84,000 m^{2}) | |
| Z Square Mall | Kanpur | 2010 | 900,000 sq ft (84,000 m^{2}) | |
| Nexus Ahmedabad One Mall (formerly Alpha One Mall) | Ahmedabad | 2011 | 885,000 sq ft (82,200 m^{2}) | |
| Gaur City Mall, Greater Noida | Greater Noida | 2019 | 861,000 sq ft (80,000 m^{2}) | |
| Infiniti Mall, Malad | Mumbai | 2011 | 850,000 sq ft (79,000 m^{2}) | |
| Orion Mall | Bengaluru | 2012 | 850,000 sq ft (79,000 m^{2}) | |
| Nexus Hyderabad Mall | Hyderabad | 2014 | 820,000 sq ft (76,000 m^{2}) | |
| Acropolis Mall | Kolkata | 2015 | 800,000 sq ft (74,000 m^{2}) | |
| Inorbit Cyberabad | Hyderabad | 2009 | 800,000 sq ft (74,000 m^{2}) | |
| MGF Metropolis Mall | Gurgaon | 2011 | 800,000 sq ft (74,000 m^{2}) | |
| Elpro City Square | Pimpri-Chinchwad | 2019 | 800,000 sq ft (74,000 m^{2}) | |
| Jio World Drive | Mumbai | 2021 | 762,300 sq ft (70,820 m^{2}) | |
| Ansal Plaza, Greater Noida | Greater Noida | 2009 | 750,000 sq ft (70,000 m^{2}) | |
| Growel's 101 | Mumbai | 2010 | 750,000 sq ft (70,000 m^{2}) | |
| Jio World Plaza | Mumbai | 2023 | 750,000 sq ft (70,000 m^{2}) | |
| Palladium Ahmedabad | Ahmedabad | 2023 | 750,000 sq ft (70,000 m^{2}) | |
| Mani Square | Kolkata | 2008 | 700,000 sq ft (65,000 m^{2}) | |
| Quest Mall | Kolkata | 2013 | 700,000 sq ft (65,000 m^{2}) | |
| Fiza by Nexus | Mangalore | 2014 | 660,000 sq ft (61,000 m^{2}) | |
| Nexus Vijaya Mall | Chennai | 2013 | 650,000 sq ft (60,000 m^{2}) | |
| Mall of Travancore | Thiruvananthapuram | 2018 | 650,000 sq ft (60,000 m^{2}) | |
| Vegas Mall | Delhi | 2019 | 650,000 sq ft (60,000 m^{2}) | |
| Centre Square Mall, Kochi | Kochi | 2013 | 630,000 sq ft (59,000 m^{2}) | |
| VR Surat | Surat | 2013 | 615,000 sq ft (57,100 m^{2}) | |
| Parsvnath Mall, Azadpur | Delhi | 2005 | 600,000 sq ft (56,000 m^{2}) | |
| Nexus Select Citywalk | Delhi | 2007 | 600,000 sq ft (56,000 m^{2}) | |
| Prozone Mall Aurangabad | Aurangabad | 2010 | 600,000 sq ft (56,000 m^{2}) | |
| Royal Meenakshi Mall | Bengaluru | 2011 | 600,000 sq ft (56,000 m^{2}) | |
| Pacific Mall, Tagore Garden | Delhi | 2011 | 600,000 sq ft (56,000 m^{2}) | |
| Bhawani Mall | Bhubaneswar | 2012 | 600,000 sq ft (56,000 m^{2}) | |
| Avani Riverside Mall | Howrah | 2012 | 600,000 sq ft (56,000 m^{2}) | |
| World Square Mall | Ghaziabad | 2014 | 600,000 sq ft (56,000 m^{2}) | |
| VR Bengaluru | Bengaluru | 2015 | 600,000 sq ft (56,000 m^{2}) | |
| Logix City Centre | Noida | 2016 | 600,000 sq ft (56,000 m^{2}) | |
| P&M Hi-Tech City Centre Mall | Jamshedpur | 2017 | 600,000 sq ft (56,000 m^{2}) | |
| Nexus Shantiniketan | Bengaluru | 2018 | 600,000 sq ft (56,000 m^{2}) | |
| Fun Republic Mall | Lucknow | 2007 | 580,000 sq ft (54,000 m^{2}) | |
| Omaxe Connaught Place | Greater Noida | 2015 | 572,000 sq ft (53,100 m^{2}) | |
| Metro Junction Mall | Kalyan | 2008 | 550,000 sq ft (51,000 m^{2}) | |
| Inorbit Mall, Vashi | Navi Mumbai | 2008 | 550,000 sq ft (51,000 m^{2}) | |
| TDI Mall, Sonipat | Sonipat | 2011 | 550,000 sq ft (51,000 m^{2}) | |
| Chennai Marina Mall | Chennai | 2019 | 550,000 sq ft (51,000 m^{2}) | |
| City Centre, Mangalore | Mangaluru | 2010 | 540,000 sq ft (50,000 m^{2}) | |
| Nexus Amritsar (formerly Mall of Amritsar and Alpha One Mall, Amritsar) | Amritsar | 2010 | 535,241 sq ft (49,725.5 m^{2}) | |
| Spencer Plaza | Chennai | 1863 | 530,000 sq ft (49,000 m^{2}) | |
| DLF Avenue (formerly DLF Place) | Delhi | 2009 | 519,596 sq ft (48,272.0 m^{2}) | |
| MGF Metropolitan Mall, Gurgaon | Gurgaon | 1998 | 500,000 sq ft (46,000 m^{2}) | |
| Inorbit Mall, Malad | Mumbai | 2004 | 500,000 sq ft (46,000 m^{2}) | |
| Pacific Mall, Ghaziabad | Ghaziabad | 2005 | 500,000 sq ft (46,000 m^{2}) | |
| Crown Interiorz Mall | Faridabad | 2007 | 500,000 sq ft (46,000 m^{2}) | |
| City Centre, New Town (City Centre 2) | Kolkata | 2009 | 500,000 sq ft (46,000 m^{2}) | |
| Axis Mall, New Town | Kolkata | 2010 | 500,000 sq ft (46,000 m^{2}) | |
| City Centre, Siliguri | Siliguri | 2010 | 500,000 sq ft (46,000 m^{2}) | |
| MSX Mall | Greater Noida | 2013 | 500,000 sq ft (46,000 m^{2}) | |
| Unity One, Janakpuri | Delhi | 2015 | 500,000 sq ft (46,000 m^{2}) | |
| Lodha Xperia Mall | Dombivali | 2016 | 500,000 sq ft (46,000 m^{2}) | |
| Prozone Mall | Coimbatore | 2017 | 500,000 sq ft (46,000 m^{2}) | |

== Andhra Pradesh ==
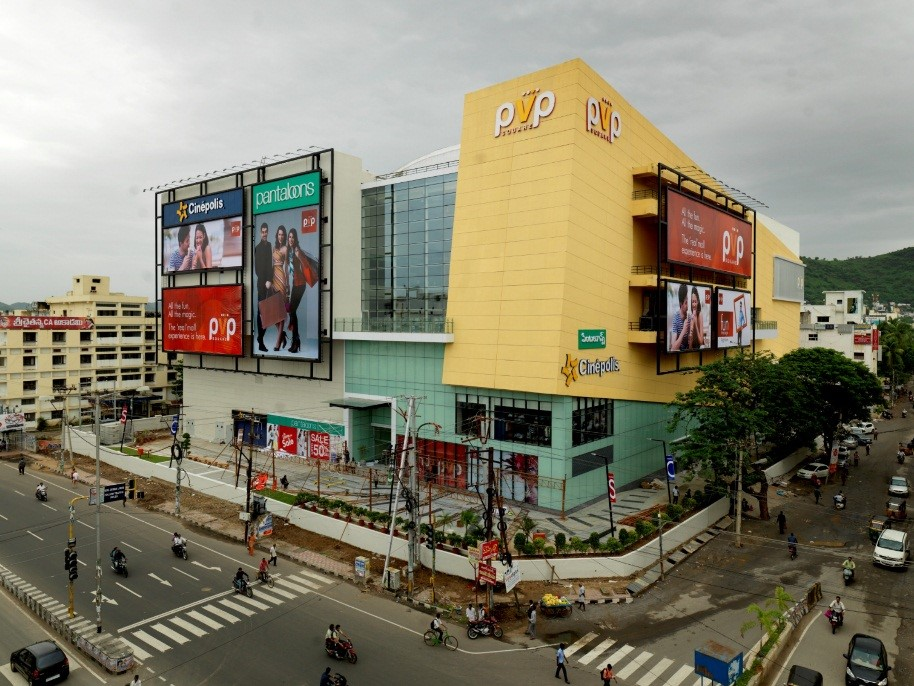
PVP Square Mall, Vijayawada

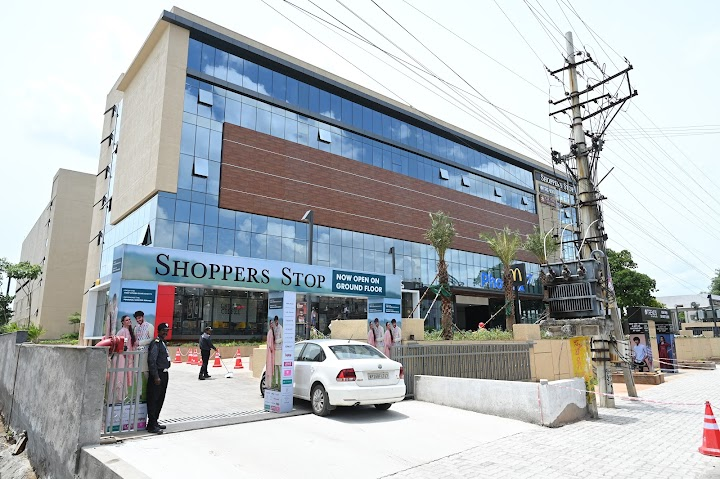
Phoenix Boorugu Mall, Guntur

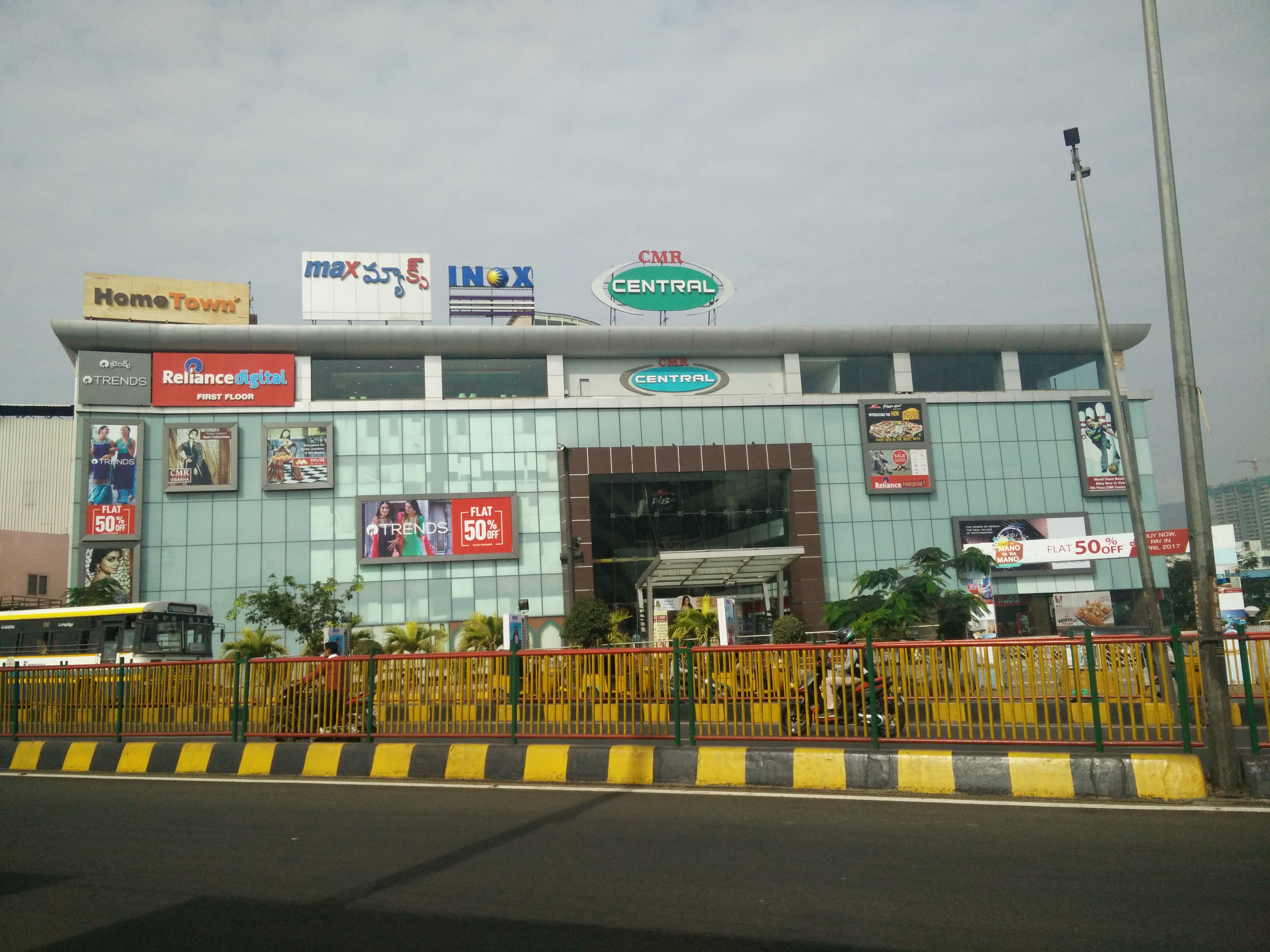
CMR Central, Visakhapatnam

| Name | Location | Year | Size (gross leasable area) | Source |
|---|---|---|---|---|
| Inorbit Visakhapatnam | Kailasapuram, Visakhapatnam | 2026 | 1,400,000 sq ft (130,000 m^{2}) | |
| Phoenix Mall | GT Road, Guntur | 2023 | 500,000 sq ft (46,000 m^{2}) | |
| MGB Felicity Mall | Nellore | 2018 | 320,000 sq ft (30,000 m^{2}) | |
| CMR Central | Maddilapalem, Visakhapatnam | 2010 | 350,000 sq ft (33,000 m^{2}) | |
| Trendset Mall | Benz Circle, Vijayawada | 2015 | 450,000 sq ft (42,000 m^{2}) | |
| PVP Square | MG Road, Vijayawada | 2014 | 427,000 sq ft (39,700 m^{2}) | |
| 82° East SRMT Mall | Ramanayyapeta, Kakinada | 2018 | 380,000 sq ft (35,000 m^{2}) | |
| BNR SV Mall | STV Nagar, Tirupati | 2016 | 300,000 sq ft (28,000 m^{2}) | |
| Garuda Mall | Akkarampalle, Tirupati | 2023 | 250,000 sq ft (23,000 m^{2}) | |
| LEPL Centro | MG Road, Vijayawada | 2014 | 200,000 sq ft (19,000 m^{2}) | |
| Ripples Mall | MG Road, Vijayawada | 2013 | 200,000 sq ft (19,000 m^{2}) | |

== Assam ==
| Name | Location | Year | Size (gross leasable area) | Source |
|---|---|---|---|---|
| Unity Mall (Ekta Mall) | Assam Trade Promotion Organisation (ATPO) Complex, Betkuchi, Guwahati | 2026 | 416,703 sq ft (38,713.0 m^{2}) | |
| Guwahati City Centre Mall | G.S. Road, Christian Basti, Guwahati | 2018 | 400,000 sq ft (37,000 m^{2}) | |
| Roodraksh Mall | Bhangagarh, Guwahati | 2016 | 300,000 sq ft (28,000 m^{2}) | |
| Dona Planet Multiplex and Mall | G.S. Road, Guwahati | 2010 | 300,000 sq ft (28,000 m^{2}) | |
| The Hub Mall | Bhangagarh, Guwahati | 2011 | 250,000 sq ft (23,000 m^{2}) | |
| Matrix Mall Beltola | Beltola, Guwahati | 2017 | 240,000 sq ft (22,000 m^{2}) | |
| Aurus Mall | Dispur Flyover, Sarumotoria, Guwahati | 2011 | 200,000 sq ft (19,000 m^{2}) | |
| Guwahati Central Mall | G.S. Road, Sree Nagar, Guwahati | 2009 | 110,000 sq ft (10,000 m^{2}) | |

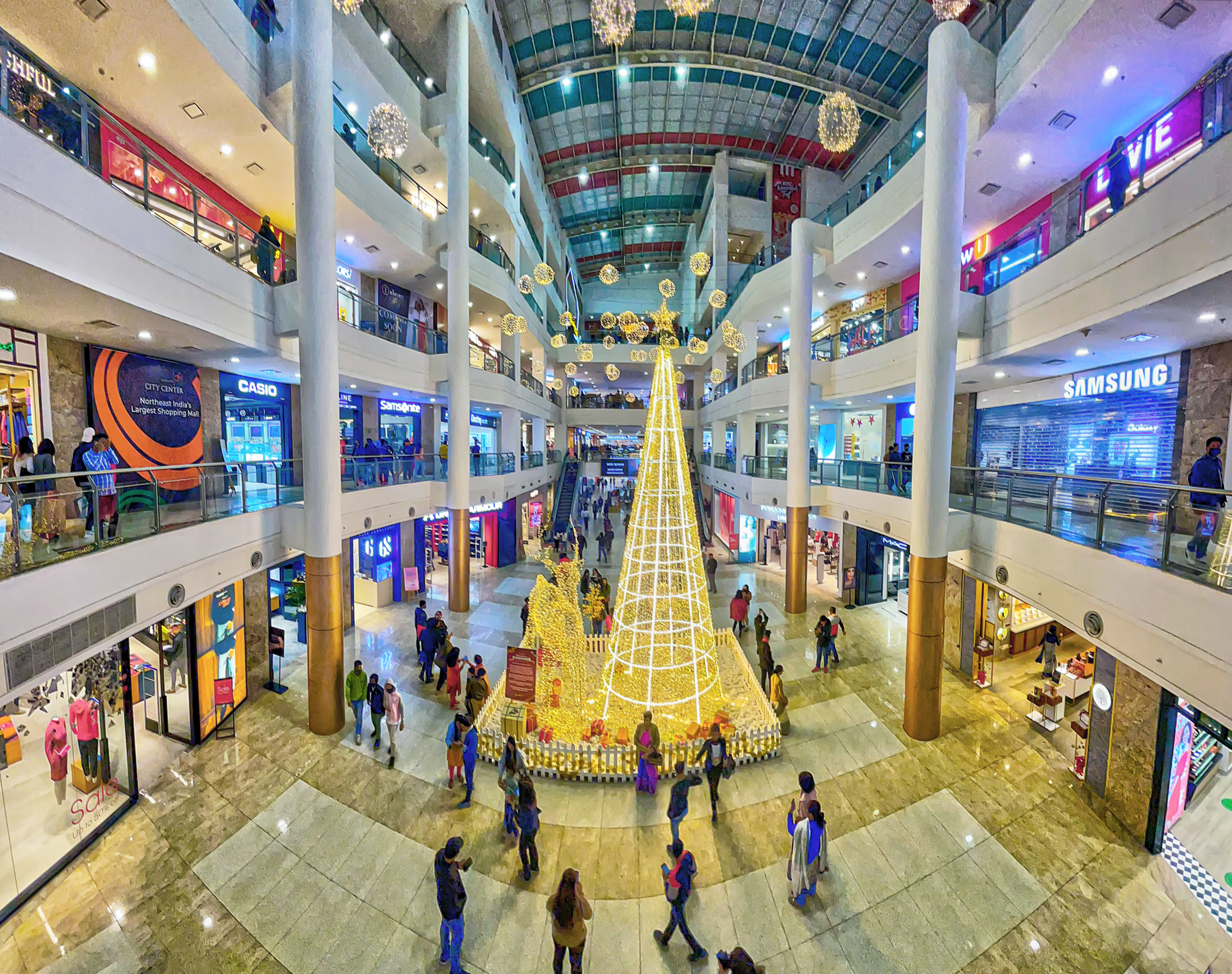
Guwahati City Centre Mall inside view

== Bihar ==
| Name | Location | Year | Size (gross leasable area) | Source |
|---|---|---|---|---|
| City Centre Patna | Buddha Marg, Patna | 2021 | 325,000 sq ft (30,200 m^{2}) | |
| Icon Plaza Mall | Muzaffarpur | 2023 | 300,000 sq ft (28,000 m^{2}) | |
| P&M Mall | Patliputra Colony, Patna | 2011 | 225,000 sq ft (20,900 m^{2}) | |
| Grand Mall | Muzaffarpur | 2017 | 200,000 sq ft (19,000 m^{2}) | |
| P&M Mall | SV Road, Bela Industrial Estate, Muzaffarpur | 2022 | 175,000 sq ft (16,300 m^{2}) | |
| The Mall | Frazer Road, Patna | 2014 | 170,000 sq ft (16,000 m^{2}) | |
| Patna One Mall | Dak Bungalow, Patna | 2017 | 90,000 sq ft (8,400 m^{2}) | |
| Gravity Mall | Kankarbagh, Patna | 2021 | 150,000 sq ft (14,000 m^{2}) | |
| Vasundhara Metro Mall | Boring Road, Patna | 2013 | 140,000 sq ft (13,000 m^{2}) | |
| J.D. Mall | Exhibition Road, Patna | 2018 | 100,000 sq ft (9,300 m^{2}) | |
| DRB Palace Mall | Muzaffarpur | 2019 | 150,000 sq ft (14,000 m^{2}) | |

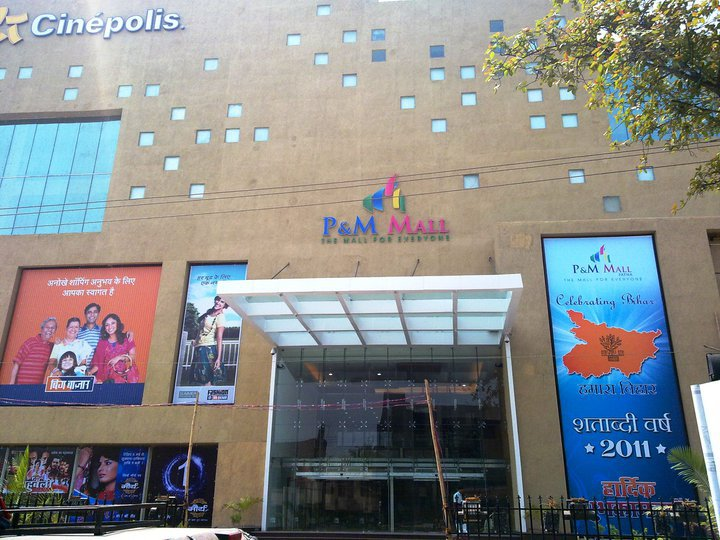
P&M Mall, Patna

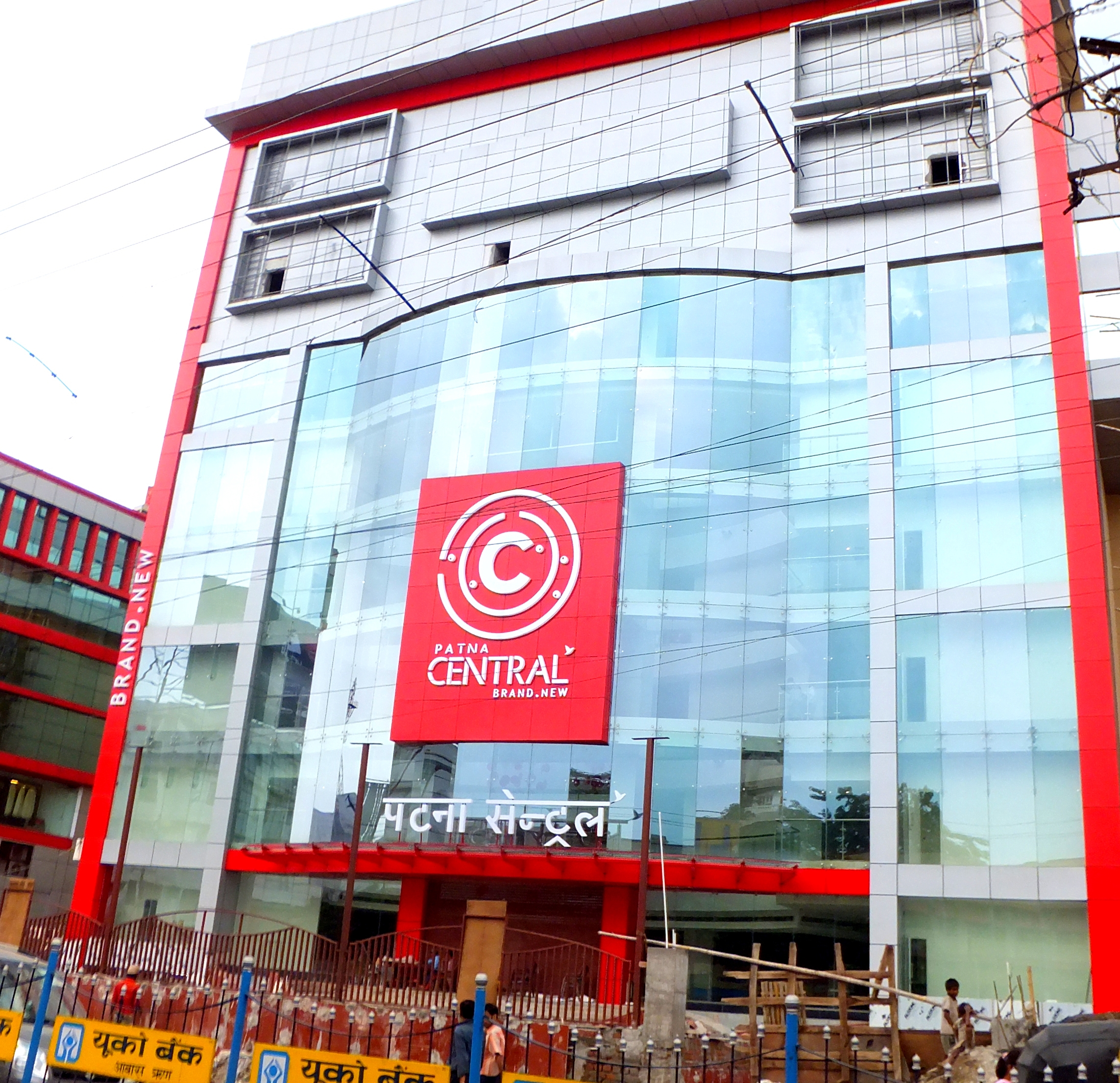
Central Mall, Patna

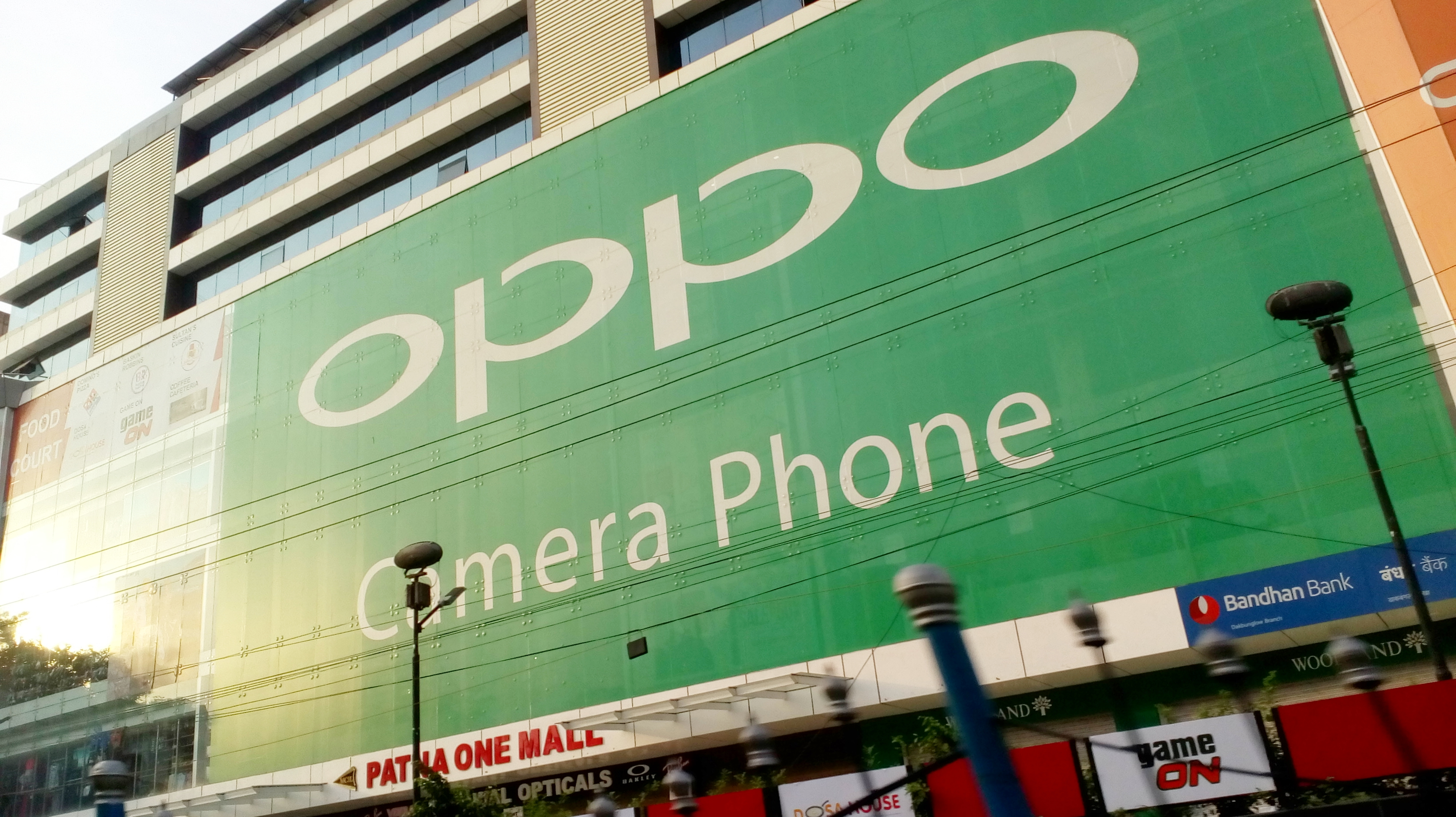
Patna One Mall, Patna

== Chandigarh ==
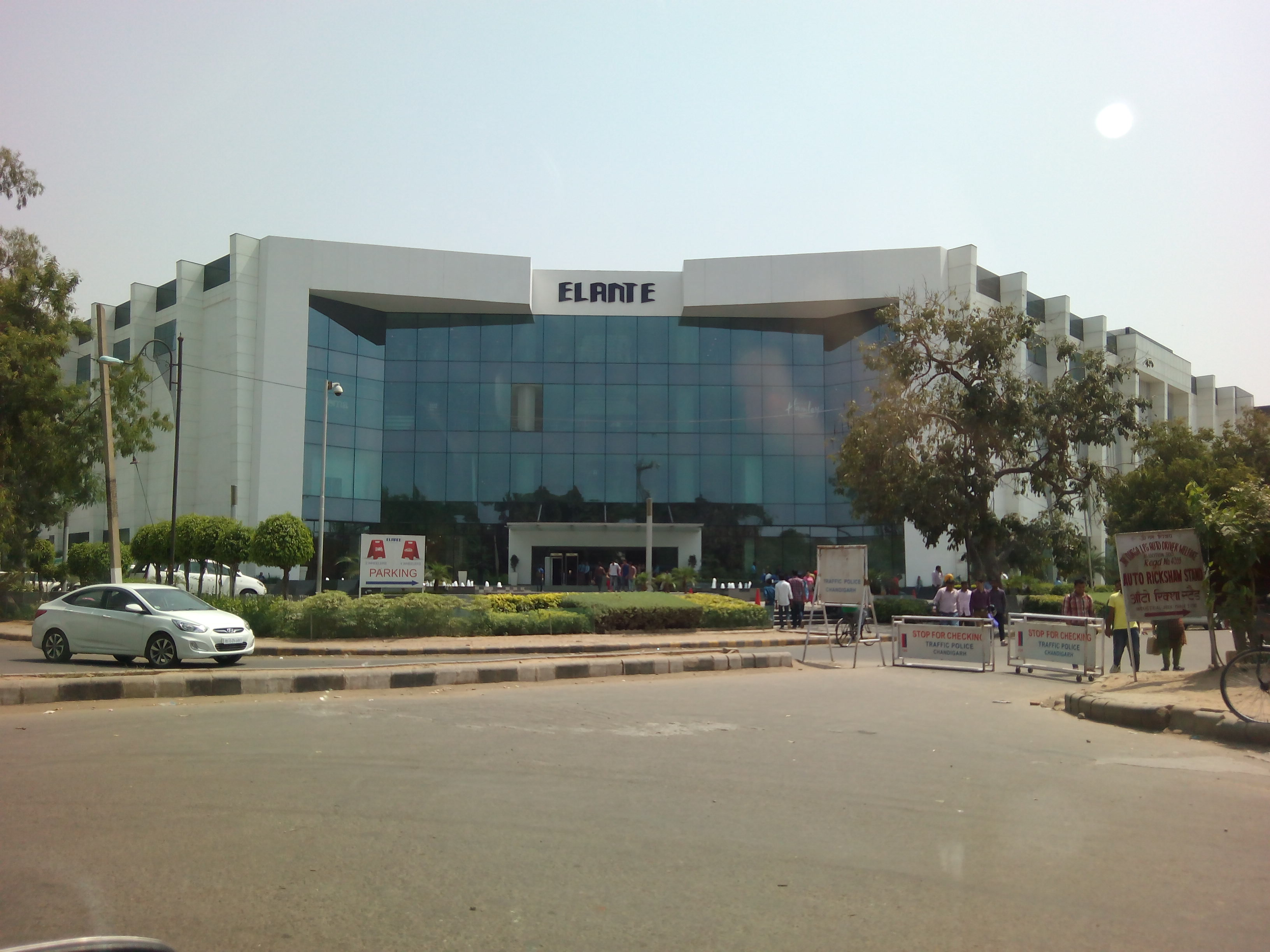
Elante Mall is the largest mall of Chandigarh

| Name | Location | Year | Size (gross leasable area) | Source |
|---|---|---|---|---|
| Nexus Elante Mall | Phase-1, Industrial Area | 2013 | 1,150,000 sq ft (107,000 m^{2}) | |
| DLF City Centre, Chandigarh (DT Mall) | Rajiv Gandhi IT Park, Sector 13 | 2008 | 200,000 sq ft (19,000 m^{2}) | |
| Centra Mall | Phase-1, Industrial Area | 2008 | 146,000 sq ft (13,600 m^{2}) | |
| TDI Jagat Mall | Sector-17 | 2016 | 120,000 sq ft (11,000 m^{2}) | |

== Chhattisgarh ==
| Name | Location | Year | Size (gross leasable area) | Source |
|---|---|---|---|---|
| Zora The Mall | Opposite Agriculture College, NH-6, Jora, Raipur | 2025 | 1,100,000 sq ft (100,000 m^{2}) | |
| City Center, Raipur | Devendra Nagar, Pandri, Raipur | 2009 | 1,100,000 sq ft (100,000 m^{2}) | |
| Magneto The Mall, Raipur | Labhandi, NH 53, Raipur | 2010 | 1,035,000 sq ft (96,200 m^{2}) | |
| Ambuja City Center | Vidhan Sabha Road, Mowa, Raipur | 2013 | 277,082 sq ft (25,741.8 m^{2}) | |
| City Mall 36, Raipur | G.E. Road, Raipur | 2007 | 300,000 sq ft (28,000 m^{2}) | |
| Surya Treasure Island | Smriti Nagar, Bhilai | 2011 | 546,402 sq ft (50,762.4 m^{2}) | |
| Rama Magneto Mall | Srikant Verma Marg, Link Road, Bilaspur | 2013 | 350,000 sq ft (33,000 m^{2}) | |
| The Palm Mall | Transport Nagar Road, Korba | 2017 | 500,000 sq ft (46,000 m^{2}) | |
| City Mall 36, Bilaspur | Mangla Chowk, Mungeli Naka, Bilaspur | 2016 | 450,000 sq ft (42,000 m^{2}) | |
| Colors Mall | Pachpedi Naka, NH 43, Raipur | 2013 | 110,000 sq ft (10,000 m^{2}) | |
| Avinash Times Square | Sector-19, Naya Raipur | 2018 | 87,187 sq ft (8,099.9 m^{2}) | |

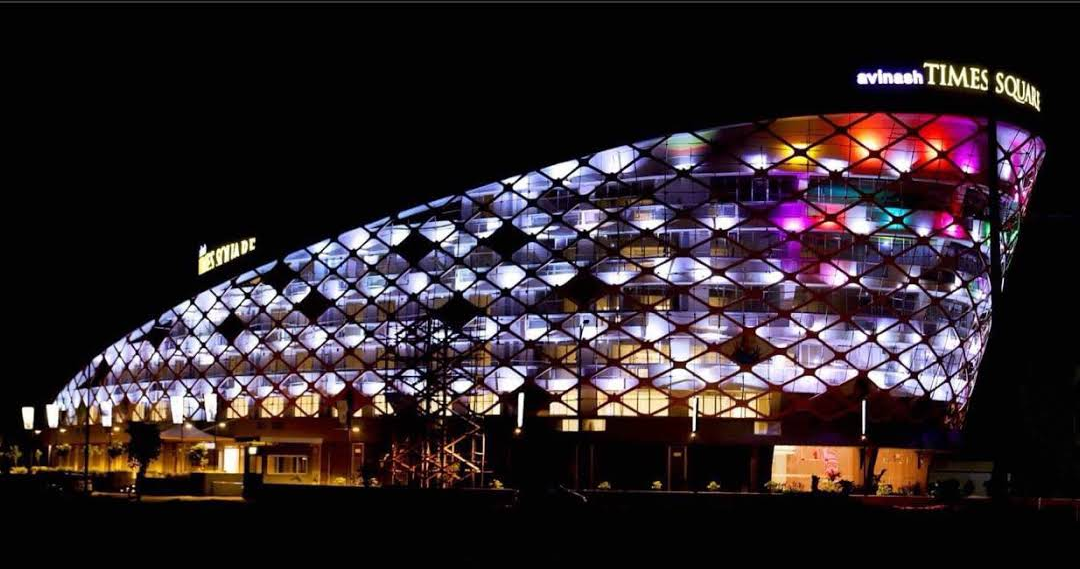
Avinash Times Square, Naya Raipur

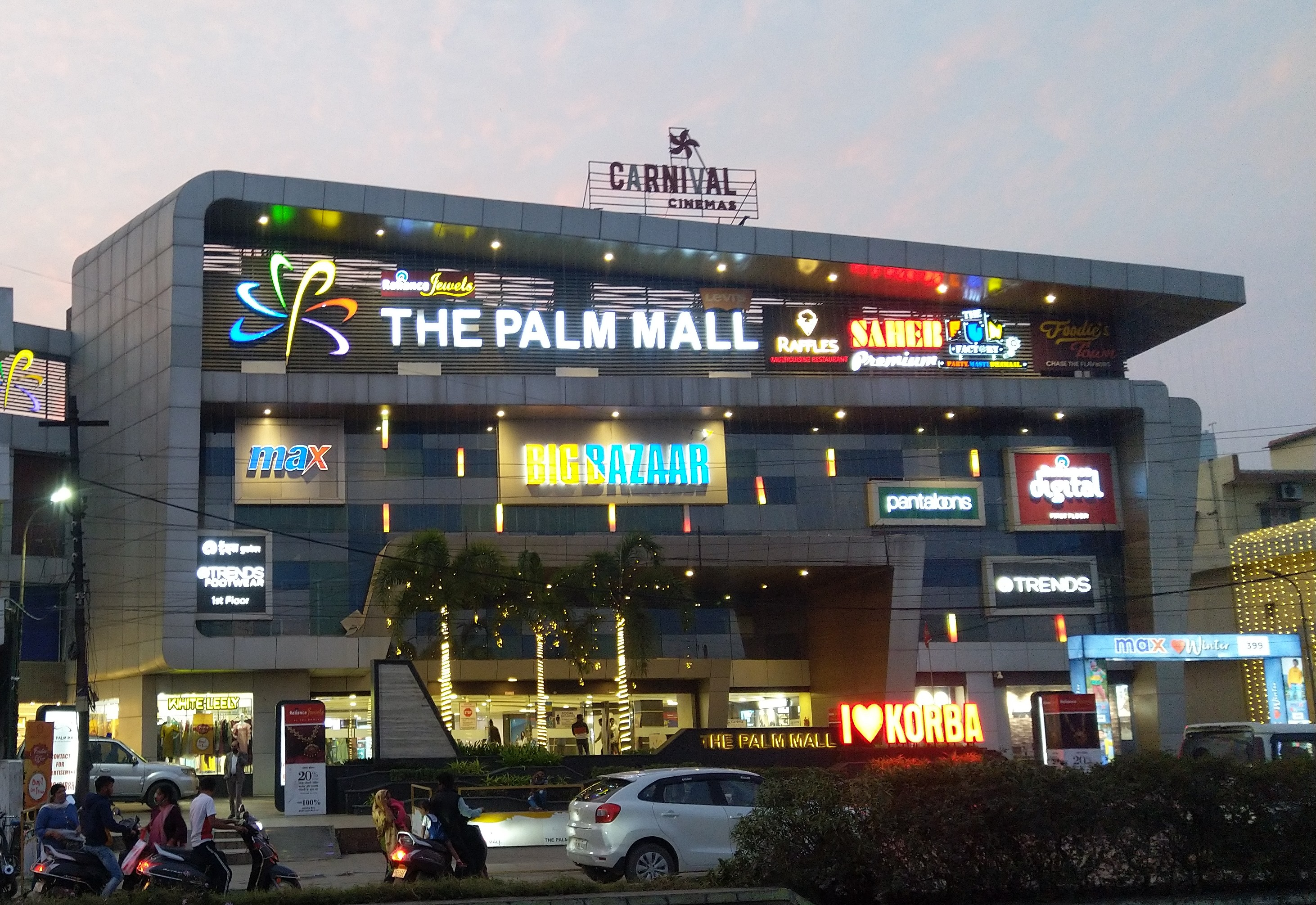
The Palm Mall, Korba

== Delhi ==
| Name | Location | Year | Size (gross leasable area) | Source |
|---|---|---|---|---|
| Ambience Mall, Vasant Kunj | Nelson Mandela Road, Vasant Kunj | 2008 | 1,200,000 sq ft (110,000 m^{2}) | |
| Vegas Mall | Sector-14, Dwarka | 2019 | 650,000 sq ft (60,000 m^{2}) | |
| Parsvnath Mall, Azadpur | Azadpur metro station | 2005 | 600,000 sq ft (56,000 m^{2}) | |
| Nexus Select Citywalk | Sector-6, Pushp Vihar, Saket Nagar | 2007 | 600,000 sq ft (56,000 m^{2}) | |
| Pacific Mall, Tagore Garden | Tagore Garden, Subhash Nagar | 2011 | 600,000 sq ft (56,000 m^{2}) | |
| DLF Avenue (formerly DLF Place) | Sector-6, Pushp Vihar, Saket Nagar | 2009 (revamped in 2019) | 519,596 sq ft (48,272.0 m^{2}) | |
| Unity One, Janakpuri | Janakpuri | 2015 | 500,000 sq ft (46,000 m^{2}) | |
| Unity One Elegante Mall | Netaji Subhash Place, Pitampura | 2025 | 500,000 sq ft (46,000 m^{2}) | |
| DLF Promenade | Nelson Mandela Road, Vasant Kunj | 2009 | 460,000 sq ft (43,000 m^{2}) | |
| MGF City Square | Shivaji Place, Rajouri Garden | 2007 | 400,000 sq ft (37,000 m^{2}) | |
| Unity One, Rohini | Sector-10, Rohini | 2016 | 400,000 sq ft (37,000 m^{2}) | |
| Ambience Mall, Rohini | Sector-10, Rohini | 2014 | 360,000 sq ft (33,000 m^{2}) | |
| D Mall, Pitampura | Netaji Subhash Place, Pitampura | 2010 | 325,000 sq ft (30,200 m^{2}) | |
| DLF Emporio | Nelson Mandela Road, Vasant Kunj | 2008 | 304,000 sq ft (28,200 m^{2}) | |
| D Mall, Rohini | Sector-10, Rohini | 2010 | 300,000 sq ft (28,000 m^{2}) | |
| V3S East Centre Mall | Nirman Vihar, Laxmi Nagar | 2011 | 300,000 sq ft (28,000 m^{2}) | |
| WorldMark Aerocity | Delhi Aerocity | 2013 | 300,000 sq ft (28,000 m^{2}) | |
| Pacific D21 Mall | Dwarka Sector 21 metro station | 2019 | 300,000 sq ft (28,000 m^{2}) | |
| Parsvnath Mall, Akshardham | Akshardham metro station | 2005 | 298,160 sq ft (27,700 m^{2}) | |
| DT City Centre, Delhi | Shalimar Bagh | 2009 | 260,000 sq ft (24,000 m^{2}) | |
| Cross River Mall | Vishwas Nagar, Shahdara | 2006 | 250,000 sq ft (23,000 m^{2}) | |
| Vasant Square Mall | Sector-B, Vasant Kunj | 2008 | 225,000 sq ft (20,900 m^{2}) | |
| Metro Walk | Sector-10, Rohini | 2007 | 221,000 sq ft (20,500 m^{2}) | |
| Parsvnath Mall, Netaji Subhash Place | Netaji Subhash Place metro station | 2005 | 208,809 sq ft (19,399.0 m^{2}) | |
| MGF Metropolitan Mall, Delhi | Sector-6, Pushp Vihar, Saket | 2005 | 200,000 sq ft (19,000 m^{2}) | |
| Aggarwal City Mall, Pitampura | Sant Nagar, Rani Bagh, Pitampura | 2007 | 200,000 sq ft (19,000 m^{2}) | |
| City Centre, Rohini | Sector-10, Rohini | 2007 | 200,000 sq ft (19,000 m^{2}) | |
| North Gate Orbit Plaza | Gujranwala Town, Model Town | 2011 | 200,000 sq ft (19,000 m^{2}) | |
| City Centre, Dwarka | Sector-12, Dwarka | 2016 | 200,000 sq ft (19,000 m^{2}) | |
| The Chanakya Mall | Chanakyapuri | 2017 | 189,000 sq ft (17,600 m^{2}) | |
| Ansal Plaza, Delhi | Khel Gaon Marg, Andrews Ganj | 1999 | 178,000 sq ft (16,500 m^{2}) | |
| JMD Kohinoor Mall | Greater Kailash | 2006 | 175,000 sq ft (16,300 m^{2}) | |
| Kings Mall | Sector-10, Rohini | 2012 | 162,000 sq ft (15,100 m^{2}) | |
| Westend Mall, Delhi | Janakpuri | 2008 | 150,000 sq ft (14,000 m^{2}) | |
| Parsvnath Mall, Inderlok | Inderlok metro station | 2005 | 142,091 sq ft (13,200.7 m^{2}) | |
| North Square Mall | Netaji Subhash Place, Pitampura | 2006 | 130,000 sq ft (12,000 m^{2}) | |
| Unity One Mall, CBD, Shahdara (formerly Aggarwal Funcity Mall) | Vishwas Nagar, Shahdara | 2008 | 125,000 sq ft (11,600 m^{2}) | |
| D Mall, Paschim Vihar | Sunder Vihar, Paschim Vihar | 2011 | 106,000 sq ft (9,800 m^{2}) | |
| Aditya Mega Mall | Vishwas Nagar, Shahdara | 2010 | 100,000 sq ft (9,300 m^{2}) | |
| TDI Paragon Mall | Shivaji Place, Rajouri Garden | 2007 | 100,000 sq ft (9,300 m^{2}) | |

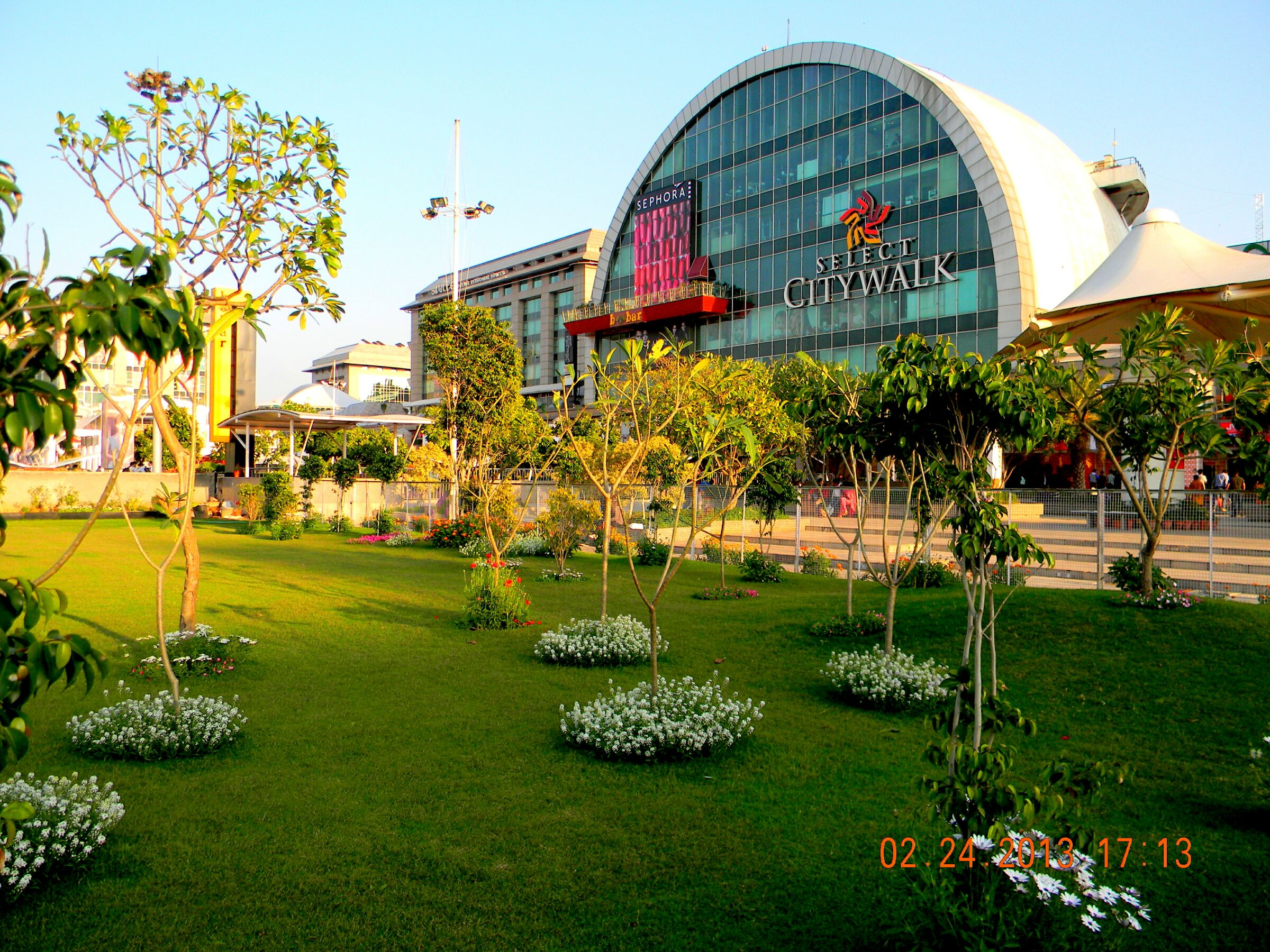
Select Citywalk, Saket

MGF City Square, Shivaji Place, Rajouri Garden

TDI Paragon Mall, Shivaji Place, Rajouri Garden

== Goa ==
| Name | Location | Year | Size (gross leasable area) | Source |
|---|---|---|---|---|
| Mall De Goa | Porvorim, Goa | 2016 | 180,000 sq ft (17,000 m^{2}) | |
| 1930 Vasco Mall | Vasco da Gama, Goa | 2011 | 100,000 sq ft (9,300 m^{2}) | |
| The Atrium Mall | Ponda, Goa | 2011 | 100,000 sq ft (9,300 m^{2}) | |
| Caculo Mall | Panaji, Goa | 2011 | 82,000 sq ft (7,600 m^{2}) | |

== Gujarat ==
| Name | Location | Year | Size (gross leasable area) | Source |
|---|---|---|---|---|
| Nexus Ahmedabad One Mall (formerly Alpha One Mall) | Vastrapur, Ahmedabad | 2011 | 885,000 sq ft (82,200 m^{2}) | |
| Palladium Ahmedabad | Thaltej, Ahmedabad | 2023 | 750,000 sq ft (70,000 m^{2}) | |
| VR Surat | Dumas Road, Surat | 2013 | 615,000 sq ft (57,100 m^{2}) | |
| Inorbit Mall, Vadodara | Gorwa, Vadodara | 2013 | 474,000 sq ft (44,000 m^{2}) | |
| RahulRaj Mall | Dumas Road, Surat | 2011 | 400,000 sq ft (37,000 m^{2}) | |
| Reliance Mall Surat | Udhana, Surat | 2017 | 300,000 sq ft (28,000 m^{2}) | |
| Himalaya Mall | Drive-in Road, Memnagar, Ahmedabad | 2007 | 270,000 sq ft (25,000 m^{2}) | |
| Titanium City Centre Mall | 100 Feet Rd, Jodhpur Village, Ahmedabad | 2008 | 250,000 sq ft (23,000 m^{2}) | |
| 7Seas Mall | Near IPCL Circle, Fatehgunj, Vadodara | 2008 | 250,000 sq ft (23,000 m^{2}) | |
| Vadodara Central Mall | Genda Circle, Vadodara | 2007 | 250,000 sq ft (23,000 m^{2}) | |
| Imperial Square Mall | Adajan, Surat | 2013 | 250,000 sq ft (23,000 m^{2}) | |
| Reliance Mega Mall | Old Padra Rd, Tandalja, Vadodara | 2012 | 230,000 sq ft (21,000 m^{2}) | |
| South West Central Mall | Sun Pharma Road, Tandalja, Vadodara | 2016 | 210,000 sq ft (20,000 m^{2}) | |
| 10-Acres Mall | Dayanand Road, Kankaria, Ahmedabad | 2012 | 210,000 sq ft (20,000 m^{2}) | |
| TRP Mall | Bopal Road, Ahmedabad | 2009 | 200,000 sq ft (19,000 m^{2}) | |
| Centro Ahmedabad | Panchwati Road, Ambawadi Circle, Ahmedabad | 2010 | 200,000 sq ft (19,000 m^{2}) | |
| The Palladium Shopping Complex, Surat | Yogi Chowk, Varachha, Surat | 2017 | 200,000 sq ft (19,000 m^{2}) | |
| Taksh Galaxy Mall | Madhavpura, Vadodara | 2019 | 200,000 sq ft (19,000 m^{2}) | |
| Iscon Prozone Mall Rajkot | 150 Ft Ring Road, Karan Park, Rajkot | 2006 | 200,000 sq ft (19,000 m^{2}) | |
| CG Square Mall | Chimanlal Girdharlal Rd, Gulbai Tekra, Ahmedabad | 2015 | 200,000 sq ft (19,000 m^{2}) | |
| Ved Arcade Mall | Vastral, Ahmedabad | 2010 | 200,000 sq ft (19,000 m^{2}) | |
| Pavilion Mall | New India Colony, Nikol, Ahmedabad | 2016 | 150,000 sq ft (14,000 m^{2}) | |
| Crystal Mall Rajkot | Kalawad Road, Rajkot | 2009 | 150,000 sq ft (14,000 m^{2}) | |
| Shree Balaji Agora Mall | S.P. Ring Road, Chandkheda, Ahmedabad | 2015 | 120,000 sq ft (11,000 m^{2}) | |
| 4D Square Mall, Motera | Motera, Ahmedabad | 2011 | 120,000 sq ft (11,000 m^{2}) | |
| Centre Square Mall | Genda Circle, Vadodara | 2008 | 110,000 sq ft (10,000 m^{2}) | |
| Reliance Mall Rajkot | 150 Ft Ring Road, Rajkot | 2013 | 110,000 sq ft (10,000 m^{2}) | |
| The Acropolis Mall | Thaltej, Ahmedabad | 2010 | 100,000 sq ft (9,300 m^{2}) | |
| Eva The Mall | Manjalpur, Vadodara | 2016 | 100,000 sq ft (9,300 m^{2}) | |
| Vandana Heritage Mall | Gondal Road, Rajkot | 2022 | 100,000 sq ft (9,300 m^{2}) | |

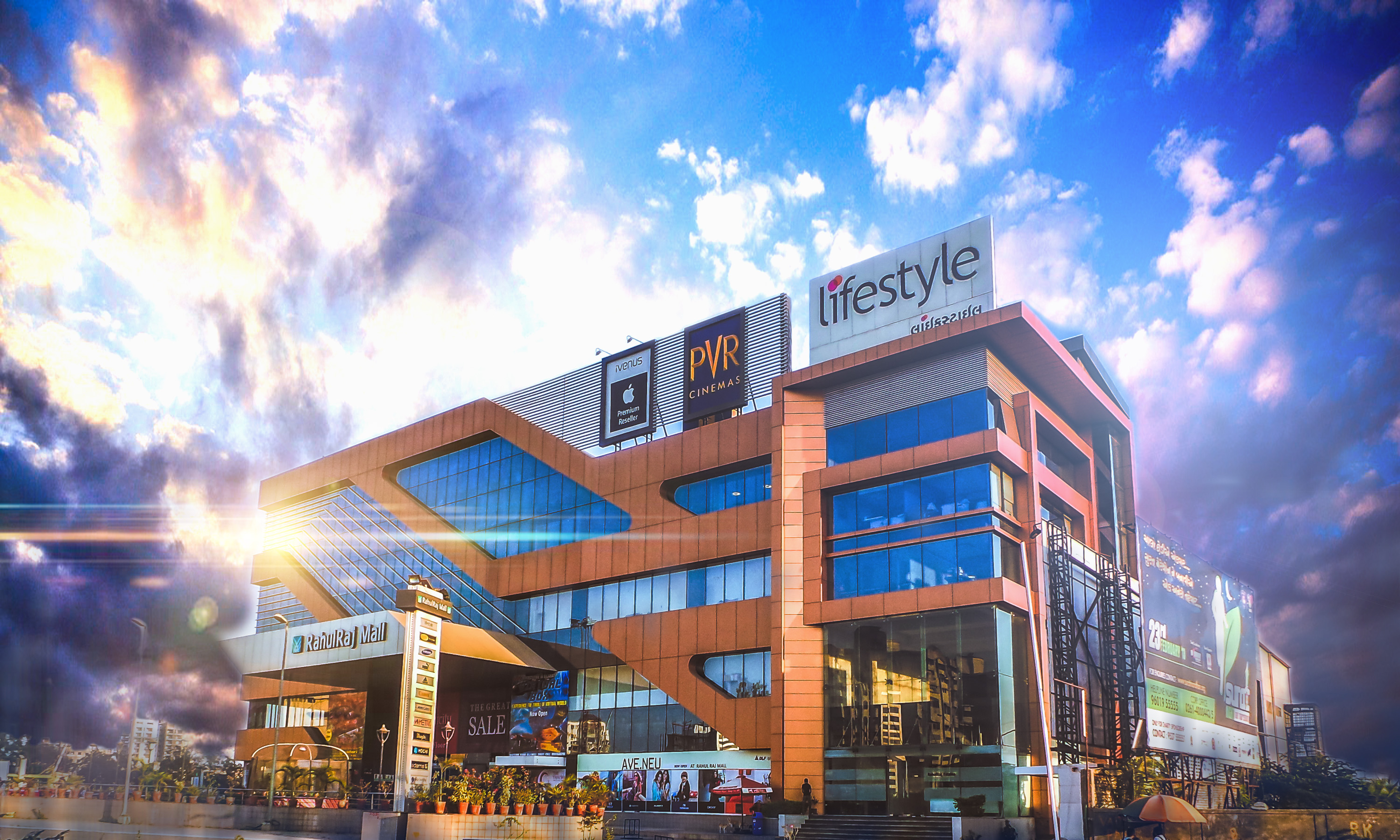
RahulRaj Mall road view

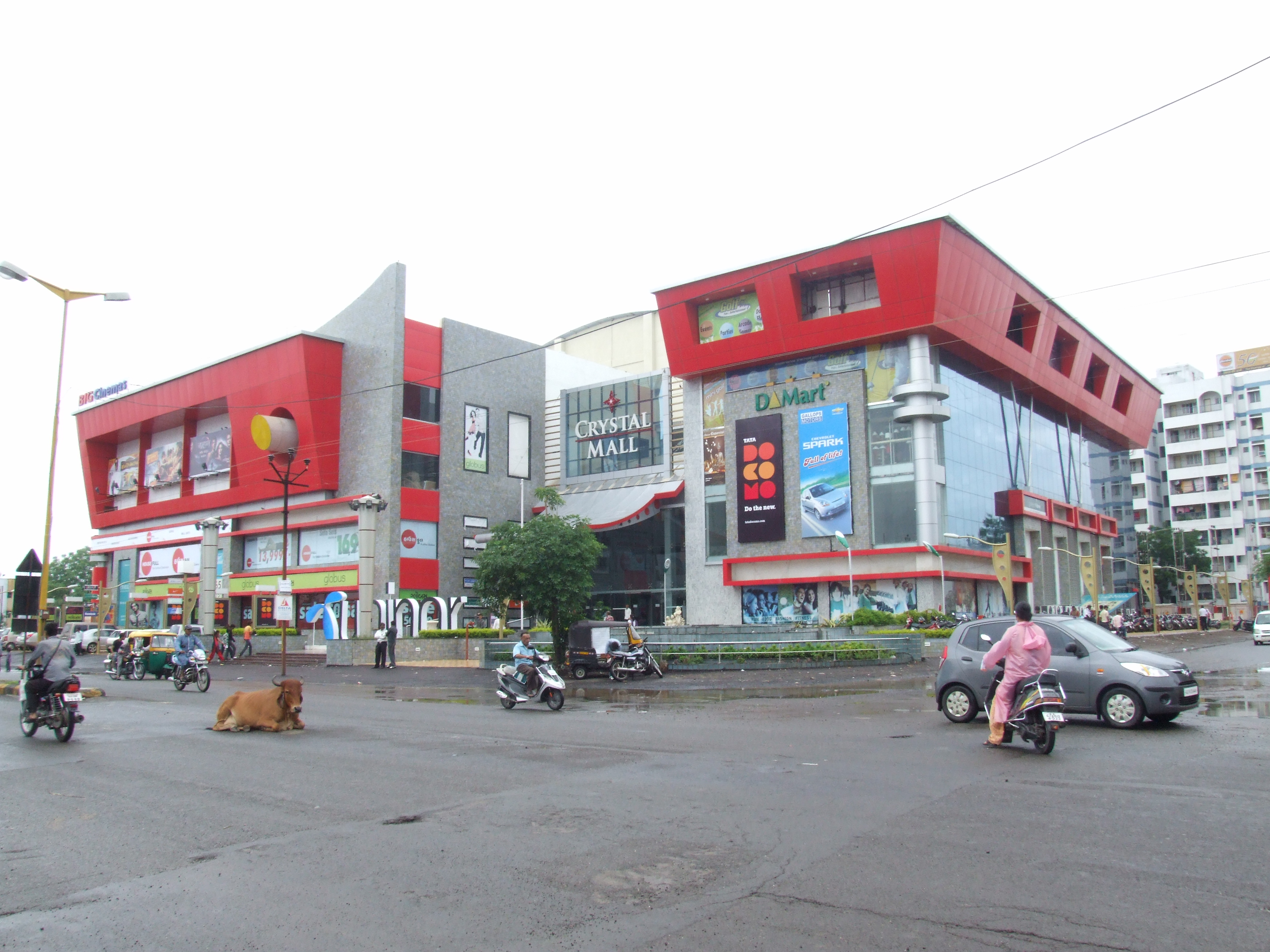
Crystal Mall Rajkot road view

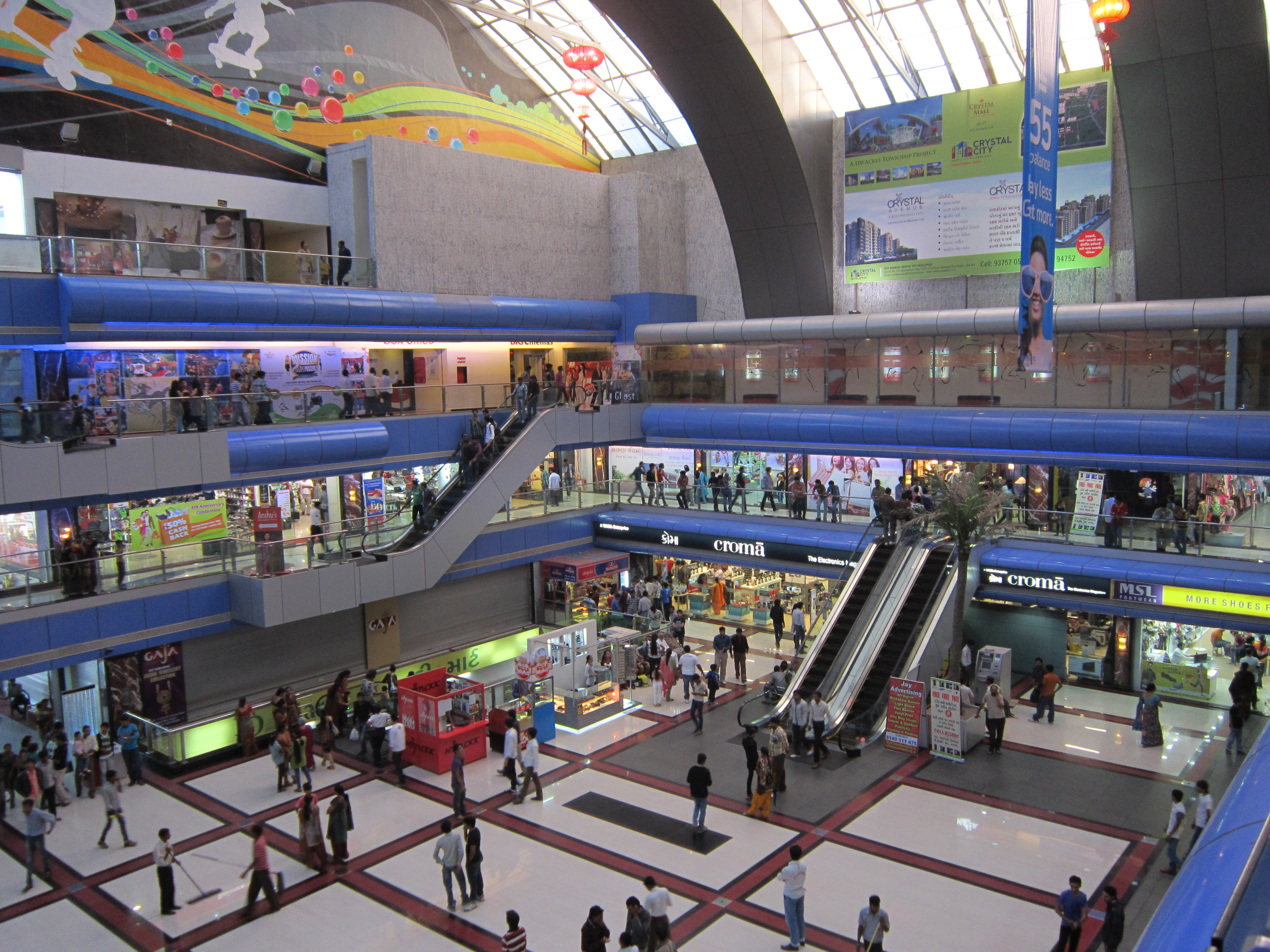
Crystal Mall Rajkot inside view

== Haryana ==
| Name | Location | Year | Size (gross leasable area) | Source |
|---|---|---|---|---|
| Ambience Mall Gurgaon | NH-8, Ambience Island, Sector-24, Gurgaon | 2007 | 1,800,000 sq ft (170,000 m^{2}) | |
| MGF Metropolis Mall | Sector-28, MG Road, Gurgaon | 2011 | 800,000 sq ft (74,000 m^{2}) | |
| TDI Mall, Sonipat | Sector-58, Kundli, Sonipat | 2011 | 550,000 sq ft (51,000 m^{2}) | |
| MGF Metropolitan Mall, Gurgaon | Sector-25, MG Road, Gurgaon | 1998 | 500,000 sq ft (46,000 m^{2}) | |
| Crown Plaza | Sector 15A, Faridabad | 2003 | 500,000 sq ft (46,000 m^{2}) | |
| Crown Interiorz Mall | Sarai Khwaja, Sector-35, Mathura Road, Faridabad | 2007 | 500,000 sq ft (46,000 m^{2}) | |
| Parker Mall | Sector-62, Kundli, Sonipat | 2014 | 425,000 sq ft (39,500 m^{2}) | |
| MGF Megacity Mall | Sector-28, MG Road, Gurgaon | 2017 | 400,000 sq ft (37,000 m^{2}) | |
| Ansal Crown Plaza | Ajronda, Sector-15A, Mathura Road, Faridabad | 2003 | 300,000 sq ft (28,000 m^{2}) | |
| DT Mega Mall | Bristol Chowk, Sector-28, Golf Course Road, Gurgaon | 2003 | 290,000 sq ft (27,000 m^{2}) | |
| World Street by Omaxe | Sector-79, Faridabad | 2012 | 290,000 sq ft (27,000 m^{2}) | |
| Pebble Downtown Mall | Bata Chowk metro station, Sector-12, Faridabad | 2011 | 200,000 sq ft (19,000 m^{2}) | |
| Raheja Mall | Sohna Road, Malibu Town, Sector-47, Gurgaon | 2009 | 290,000 sq ft (27,000 m^{2}) | |
| DLF South Point Mall | Genpact Chowk, Sector-53, Golf Course Road, Gurgaon | 2022 | 278,853 sq ft (25,906.3 m^{2}) | |
| Omaxe Gurgaon Mall | Sector-49, Sohna Road, Gurgaon | 2006 | 265,000 sq ft (24,600 m^{2}) | |
| DLF City Centre, Gurgaon | Sector-28, MG Road, Gurgaon | 2003 | 260,000 sq ft (24,000 m^{2}) | |
| Ansal Plaza, Gurgaon | Rezang La Chowk, Palam Vihar, Sector-23, Gurgaon | 2007 | 260,000 sq ft (24,000 m^{2}) | |
| Airia Mall | Sohna Road, Badshahpur, Sector-68, Gurgaon | 2020 | 253,505 sq ft (23,551.4 m^{2}) | |
| Ansal Highway Plaza | Sector-62, Kundli, Sonipat | 2008 | 250,000 sq ft (23,000 m^{2}) | |
| Ardee Mall | Ardee City, Sector-52, Gurgaon | 2017 | 250,000 sq ft (23,000 m^{2}) | |
| Piyush Mahendra Mall | Aravalli Golf Course, Faridabad | 2009 | 250,000 sq ft (23,000 m^{2}) | |
| Sahara Mall | Sector-28, MG Road, Gurgaon | 2001 | 230,000 sq ft (21,000 m^{2}) | |
| Star Mall, Gurgaon | NH-8, Jal Vayu Vihar, Sector-30, Gurgaon | 2007 | 219,000 sq ft (20,300 m^{2}) | |
| DLF Grand Mall | Sector-28, MG Road, Gurgaon | 2005 | 210,507 sq ft (19,556.7 m^{2}) | |
| The Esplanade Mall | Sector-37C, Gurgaon | 2021 | 200,000 sq ft (19,000 m^{2}) | |
| The Mall of Faridabad | KL Mehta Road, Faridabad | 2022 | 200,000 sq ft (19,000 m^{2}) | |
| Gold Souk Mall, Gurgaon | Vyaper Kendra Road, Kanhai, Sector-43, Gurgaon | 2004 | 180,000 sq ft (17,000 m^{2}) | |
| Mittal's Mega Mall | Huda Sector-25, Panipat | 2007 | 160,000 sq ft (15,000 m^{2}) | |
| Omaxe Celebration Mall | Subhash Chowk, Sector-48, Sohna Road, Gurgaon | 2010 | 155,000 sq ft (14,400 m^{2}) | |
| Eldeco Station 1 Mall | Sector-12, Mathura Road, Faridabad | 2010 | 150,000 sq ft (14,000 m^{2}) | |
| SRS Mall, Faridabad | Sector-12, Faridabad | 2002 | 137,970 sq ft (12,818 m^{2}) | |
| Eros EF3 Mall | Sector-20A, Faridabad | 2008 | 130,000 sq ft (12,000 m^{2}) | |
| Gurgaon Central | Sector-25, MG Road, Gurgaon | 2009 | 125,000 sq ft (11,600 m^{2}) | |
| Central Plaza, Gurgaon | Sector-53, Golf Course Road, Gurgaon | 2003 | 100,000 sq ft (9,300 m^{2}) | |
| Kessel Mall, Kurukshetra | Sector-17, Thanesar, Kurukshetra | 2009 | 100,000 sq ft (9,300 m^{2}) | |
| Pristine Mall, Faridabad | Inder Colony, Sector-31, Faridabad | 2007 | 100,000 sq ft (9,300 m^{2}) | |

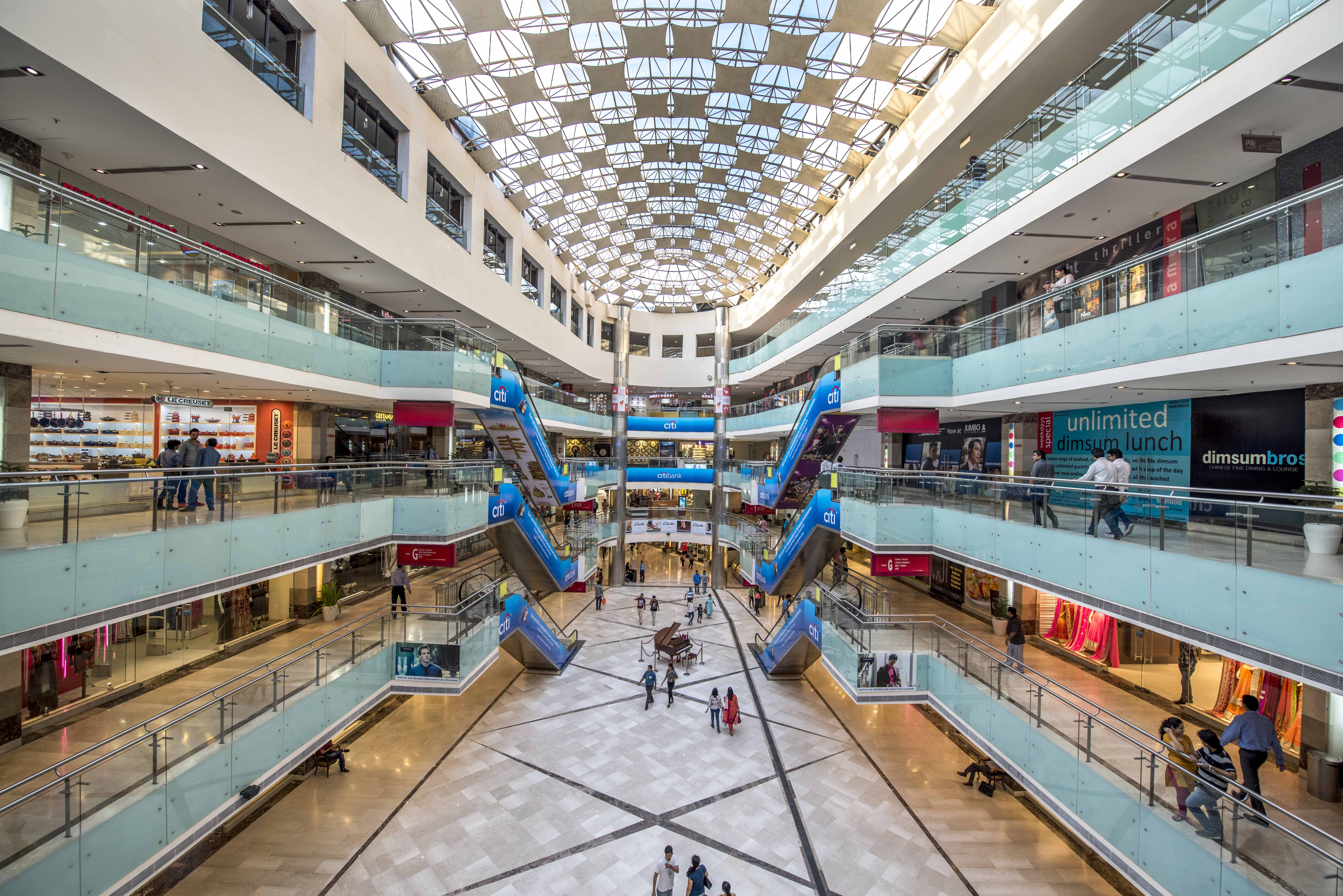
Inside view, Ambience Mall, Gurgaon

== Jharkhand ==
| Name | Location | Year | Size (gross leasable area) | Source |
|---|---|---|---|---|
| P&M Hi-Tech City Centre Mall | Bistupur, Jamshedpur | 2017 | 600,000 sq ft (56,000 m^{2}) | |
| Mall De-Cor | Lalpur, Ranchi | 2013 | 500,000 sq ft (46,000 m^{2}) | |
| Eastern Mall | Dangratoli Chowk, Ranchi | 2014 | 280,000 sq ft (26,000 m^{2}) | |
| Prabhatam Complex Mall | Dhanbad | 2021 | 250,000 sq ft (23,000 m^{2}) | |
| Ranchi Centro | Hindpiri, Ranchi | 2009 | 250,000 sq ft (23,000 m^{2}) | |
| The Bokaro Mall | Sector 3, Bokaro Steel City | 2016 | 230,000 sq ft (21,000 m^{2}) | |
| Ozone Galleria Mall | Dhanbad | 2015 | 200,000 sq ft (19,000 m^{2}) | |
| Mall of Ranchi | Kumhartoli, Ranchi | 2023 | 200,000 sq ft (19,000 m^{2}) | |
| Shri Ram Plaza, Dhanbad | Bank More, Dhanbad | 2005 | 200,000 sq ft (19,000 m^{2}) | |
| Nucleus Mall, Ranchi | Lalpur, Ranchi | 2011 | 150,000 sq ft (14,000 m^{2}) | |
| Spring City Mall | Hinoo, Ranchi | 2011 | 110,000 sq ft (10,000 m^{2}) | |
| Harsh Vardhan Plaza | City Centre, Sector 4, Bokaro | 2007 | 110,000 sq ft (10,000 m^{2}) | |
| Center Point Mall | Katras Road, Bank More, Dhanbad | 2008 | 110,000 sq ft (10,000 m^{2}) | |
| City Centre, Dhanbad | Dhanbad | 1999 | 100,000 sq ft (9,300 m^{2}) | |

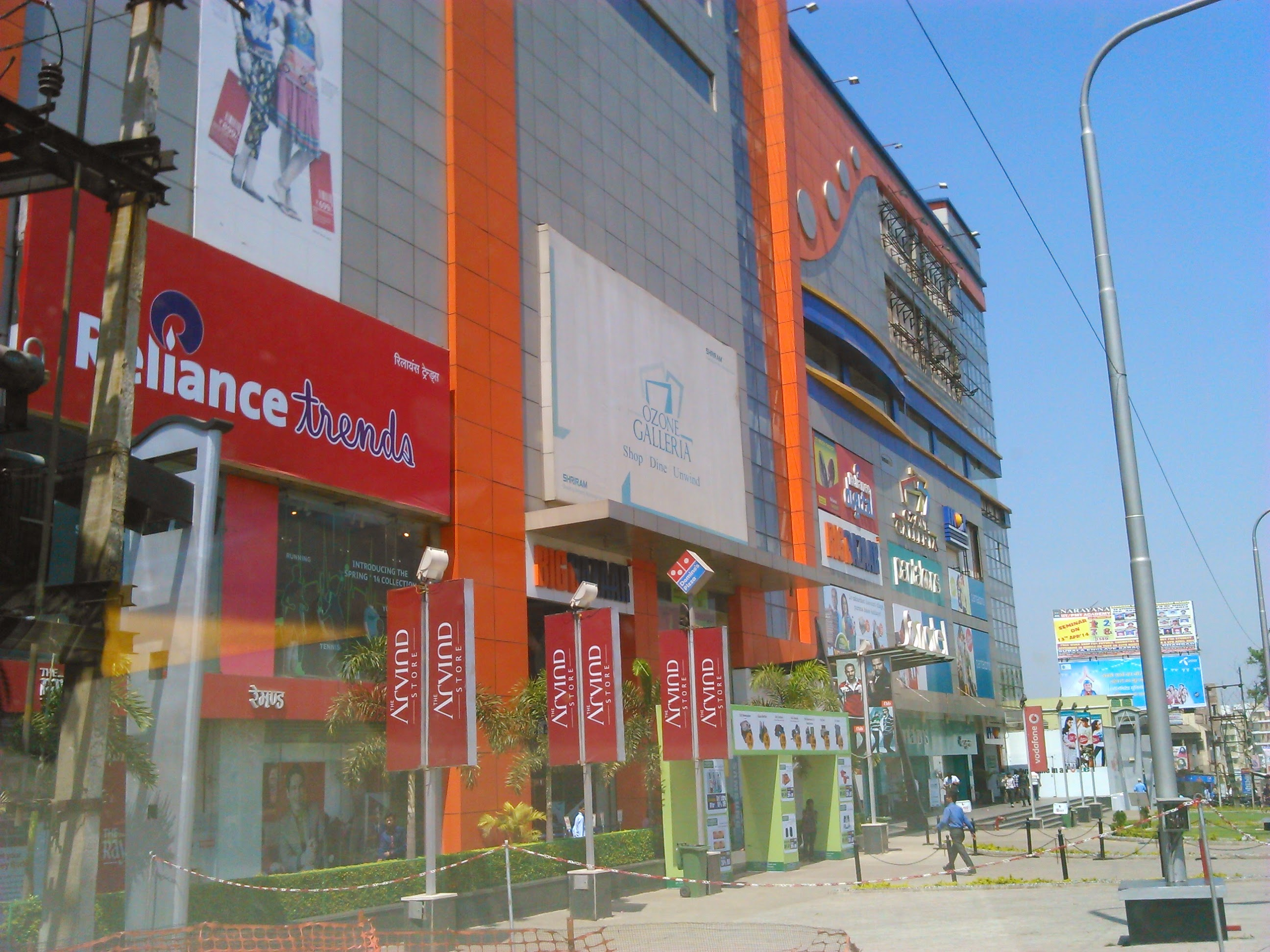
Ozone Galleria Mall, Dhanbad

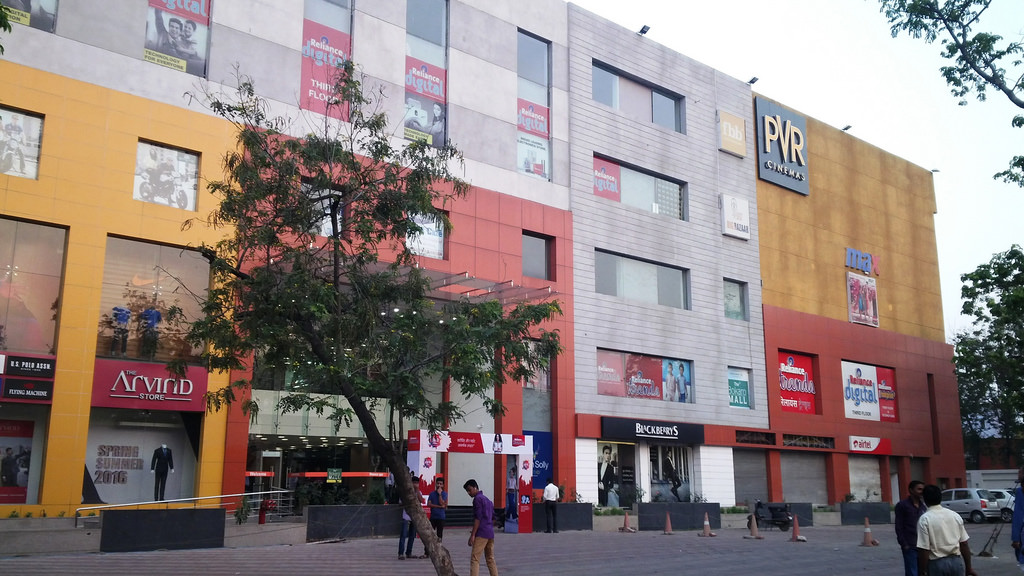
The Bokaro Mall, Bokaro

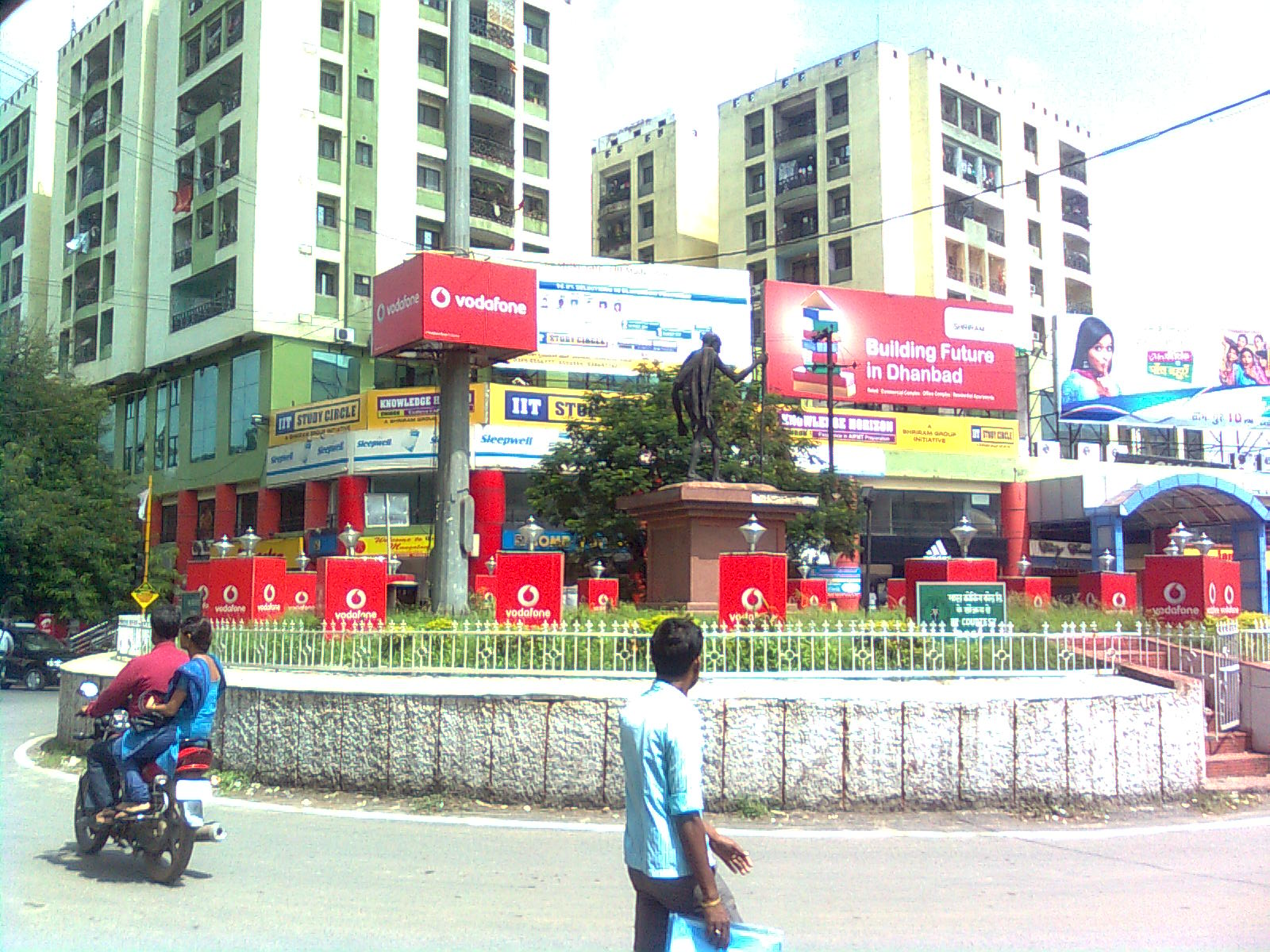
City Centre, Dhanbad

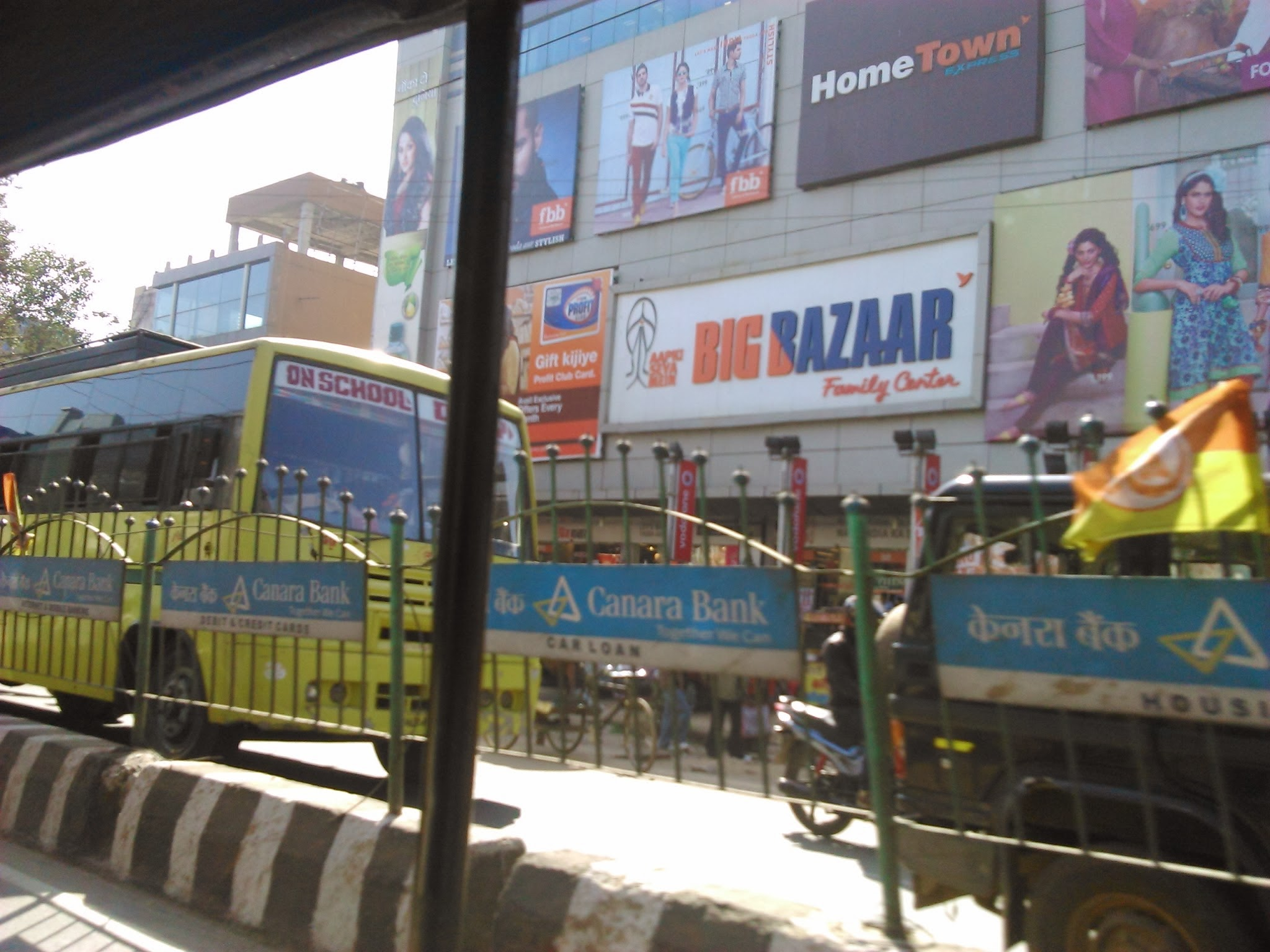
JD Hi Street Mall, Ranchi

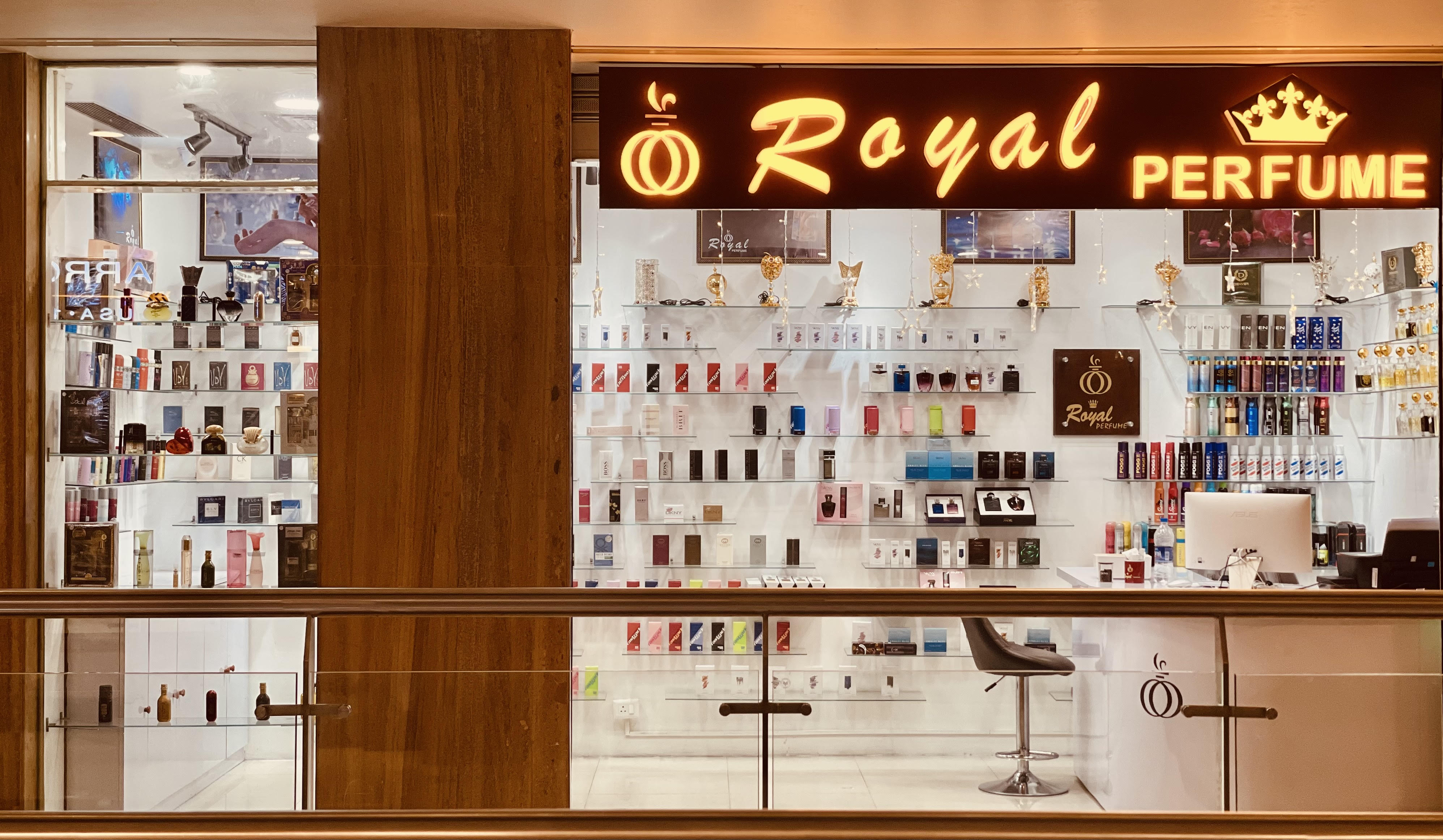
Inside view, P&M Hi-Tech City Centre Mall, Jamshedpur

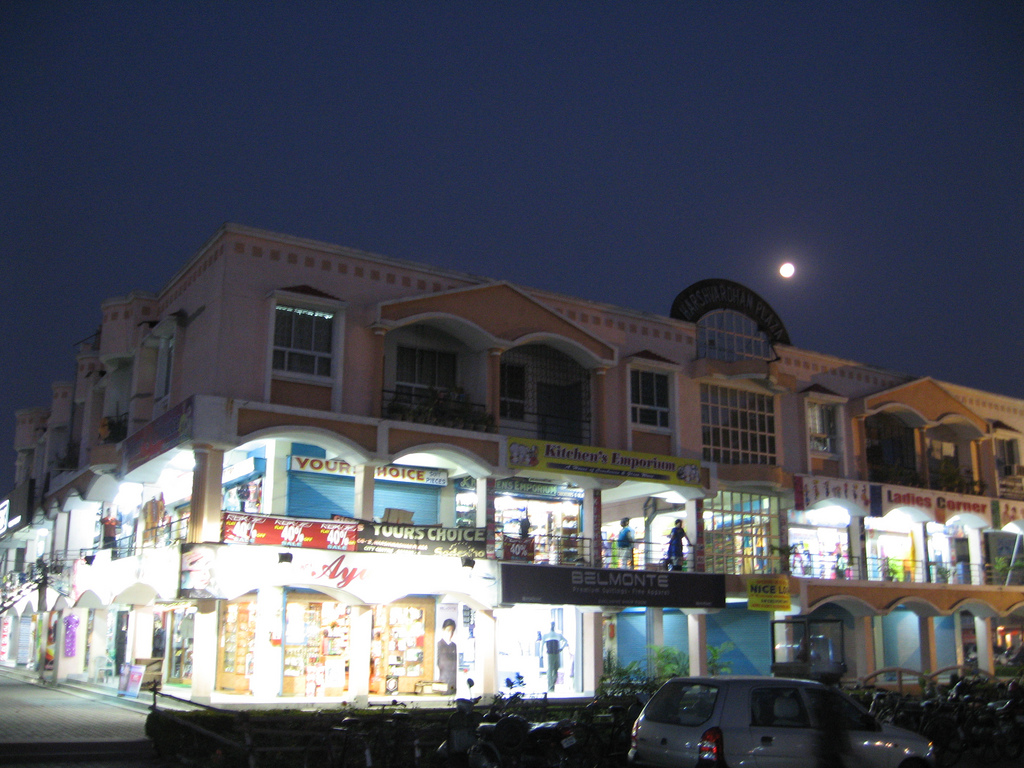
Harsh Vardhan Plaza, Bokaro

== Karnataka ==
| Name | Location | Year | Size (gross leasable area) | Source |
|---|---|---|---|---|
| Phoenix Mall of Asia | Byatarayapura, Bengaluru | 2023 | 1,200,000 sq ft (110,000 m^{2}) | |
| Forum South Bengaluru | J.P. Nagar, Bengaluru | 2022 | 1,000,000 sq ft (93,000 m^{2}) | |
| Mantri Square | Malleswara, Bengaluru | 2010 | 1,000,000 sq ft (93,000 m^{2}) | |
| Phoenix Marketcity | Whitefield, Bengaluru | 2011 | 1,000,000 sq ft (93,000 m^{2}) | |
| Lotus Mall | Nanthoor, Mangaluru | 2021 | 900,000 sq ft (84,000 m^{2}) | |
| M5 ECity Mall | Electronic City, Bengaluru | 2024 | 900,000 sq ft (84,000 m^{2}) | |
| Orion Mall | Malleswara-Rajajinagara, Bengaluru | 2012 | 850,000 sq ft (79,000 m^{2}) | |
| Bhartiya Mall of Bengaluru | Thanisandra, Bengaluru | 2021 | 800,000 sq ft (74,000 m^{2}) | |
| Fiza by Nexus | Pandeshwar, Mangaluru | 2014 | 660,000 sq ft (61,000 m^{2}) | |
| Royal Meenakshi Mall | Hulimavu, Bengaluru | 2011 | 600,000 sq ft (56,000 m^{2}) | |
| VR Bengaluru | Whitefield, Bengaluru | 2015 | 600,000 sq ft (56,000 m^{2}) | |
| Nexus Shantiniketan | Whitefield, Bengaluru | 2018 | 600,000 sq ft (56,000 m^{2}) | |
| Gopalan Signature Mall | Old Madras Rd, Bengaluru | 2011 | 600,000 sq ft (56,000 m^{2}) | |
| The Galleria Mall | Yelahanka, Bengaluru | 2018 | 550,000 sq ft (51,000 m^{2}) | |
| City Centre, Mangalore | K S Rao Road, Mangaluru | 2010 | 540,000 sq ft (50,000 m^{2}) | |
| 1 MG Lido Mall | Halasuru, Bengaluru | 2010 | 500,000 sq ft (46,000 m^{2}) | |
| Park Square Mall | Whitefield, Bengaluru | 2011 | 400,000 sq ft (37,000 m^{2}) | |
| Urban Oasis Mall | Gokul Road, Hubballi | 2012 | 375,000 sq ft (34,800 m^{2}) | |
| Nexus Koramangala | Koramangala, Bengaluru | 2004 | 365,000 sq ft (33,900 m^{2}) | |
| Nexus Centre City Mall | Nazarbad, Mysuru | 2018 | 347,000 sq ft (32,200 m^{2}) | |
| Nexus Whitefield | Whitefield, Bengaluru | 2009 | 300,000 sq ft (28,000 m^{2}) | |
| Nexus Vega City Mall | BTM Layout, Bengaluru | 2017 | 300,000 sq ft (28,000 m^{2}) | |
| Brookefield Mall | Brookefield, Bengaluru | 2009 | 300,000 sq ft (28,000 m^{2}) | |
| Global Mall | Mysore Rd, Nayandahalli, Bengaluru | 2021 | 290,000 sq ft (27,000 m^{2}) | |
| Garuda Mall | Magrath Road, Bengaluru | 2005 | 280,000 sq ft (26,000 m^{2}) | |
| Mall of Mysore | M.G.Road, Mysuru | 2012 | 262,000 sq ft (24,300 m^{2}) | |
| Elements Mall | Thanisandra Main Road, Nagavara, Bengaluru | 2012 | 260,000 sq ft (24,000 m^{2}) | |
| ETA Mall | Binnypete, Bengaluru | 2015 | 250,000 sq ft (23,000 m^{2}) | |
| Gopalan Promenade Mall | Banashankari, Bengaluru | 2011 | 250,000 sq ft (23,000 m^{2}) | |
| Gopalan Grand Mall | CV Raman Nagar, Bengaluru | 2011 | 250,000 sq ft (23,000 m^{2}) | |
| BM Habitat Mall | Jayalakshmipura, Mysuru | 2012 | 240,000 sq ft (22,000 m^{2}) | |
| S Mall | TUDA Layout, Tumakuru | 2021 | 230,565 sq ft (21,420.2 m^{2}) | |
| GT World Mall | Chlourpalya, Bengaluru | 2017 | 210,000 sq ft (20,000 m^{2}) | |
| Bharat Mall, Mangalore | Bejai, Mangaluru | 2006 | 200,000 sq ft (19,000 m^{2}) | |
| Gopalan Legacy Mall | Sirsi Circle, Bengaluru | 2011 | 200,000 sq ft (19,000 m^{2}) | |
| Esteem Mall | Hebbal, Bengaluru | 2007 | 150,000 sq ft (14,000 m^{2}) | |
| Garuda Swagath Mall | Jayanagar, Bengaluru | 2008 | 130,000 sq ft (12,000 m^{2}) | |
| Lulu Mall, Bengaluru | Binnypete, Bengaluru | 2021 | 130,000 sq ft (12,000 m^{2}) | |
| Gopalan Innovation Mall | J.P. Nagar, Bengaluru | 2004 | 120,000 sq ft (11,000 m^{2}) | |
| UB City Mall | Vittal Mallya Road, Bengaluru | 2008 | 100,000 sq ft (9,300 m^{2}) | |
| Soul Space Spirit Centro Mall | Bellandur, Bengaluru | 2011 | 100,000 sq ft (9,300 m^{2}) | |
| City Centre Mall, Shimoga | KSTRC Bus Station, Shivamogga | 2014 | 85,000 sq ft (7,900 m^{2}) | |
| Mak Mall | Kankanady, Mangaluru | 2013 | 70,000 sq ft (6,500 m^{2}) | |

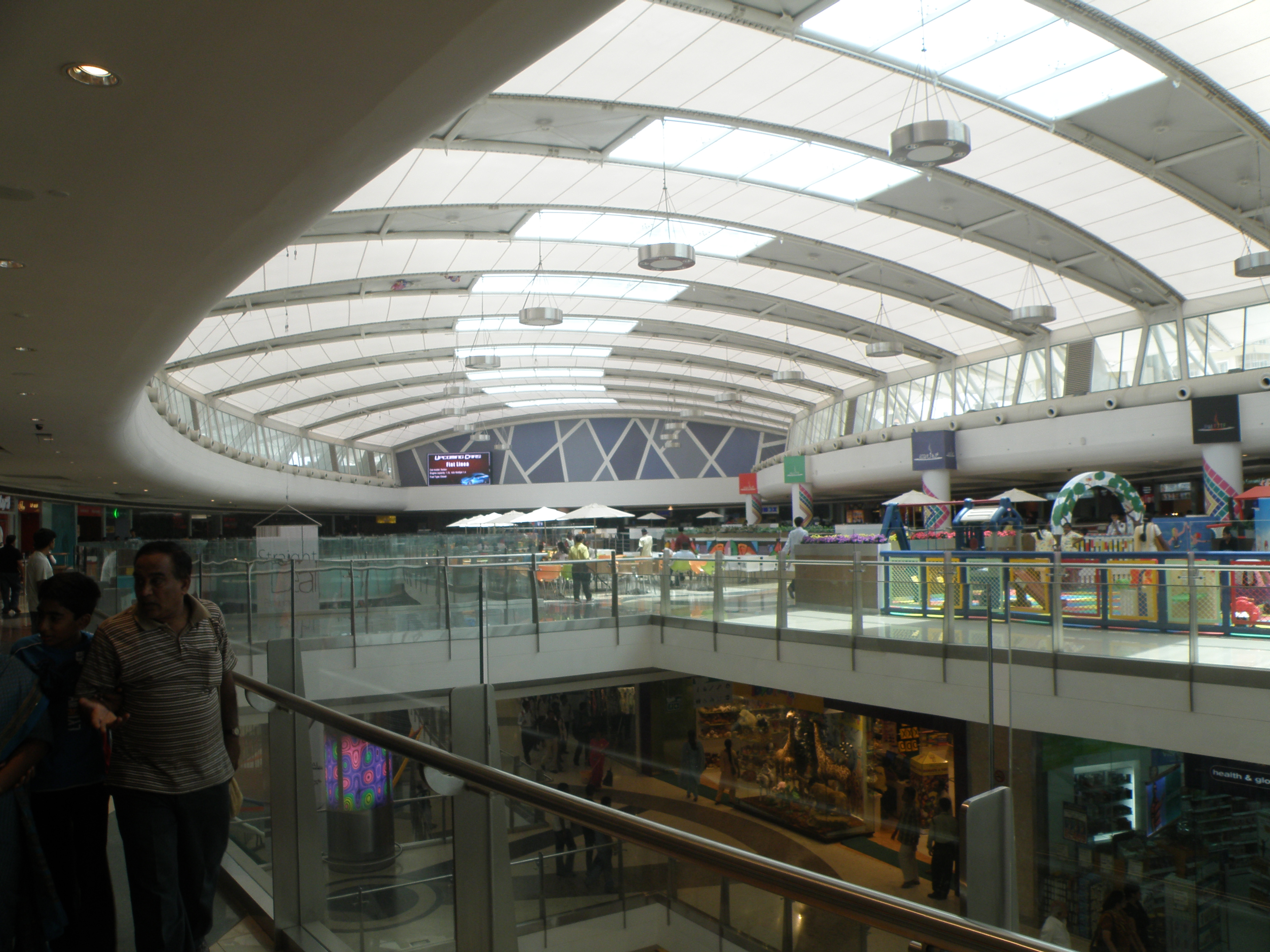
Mantri Square top floor

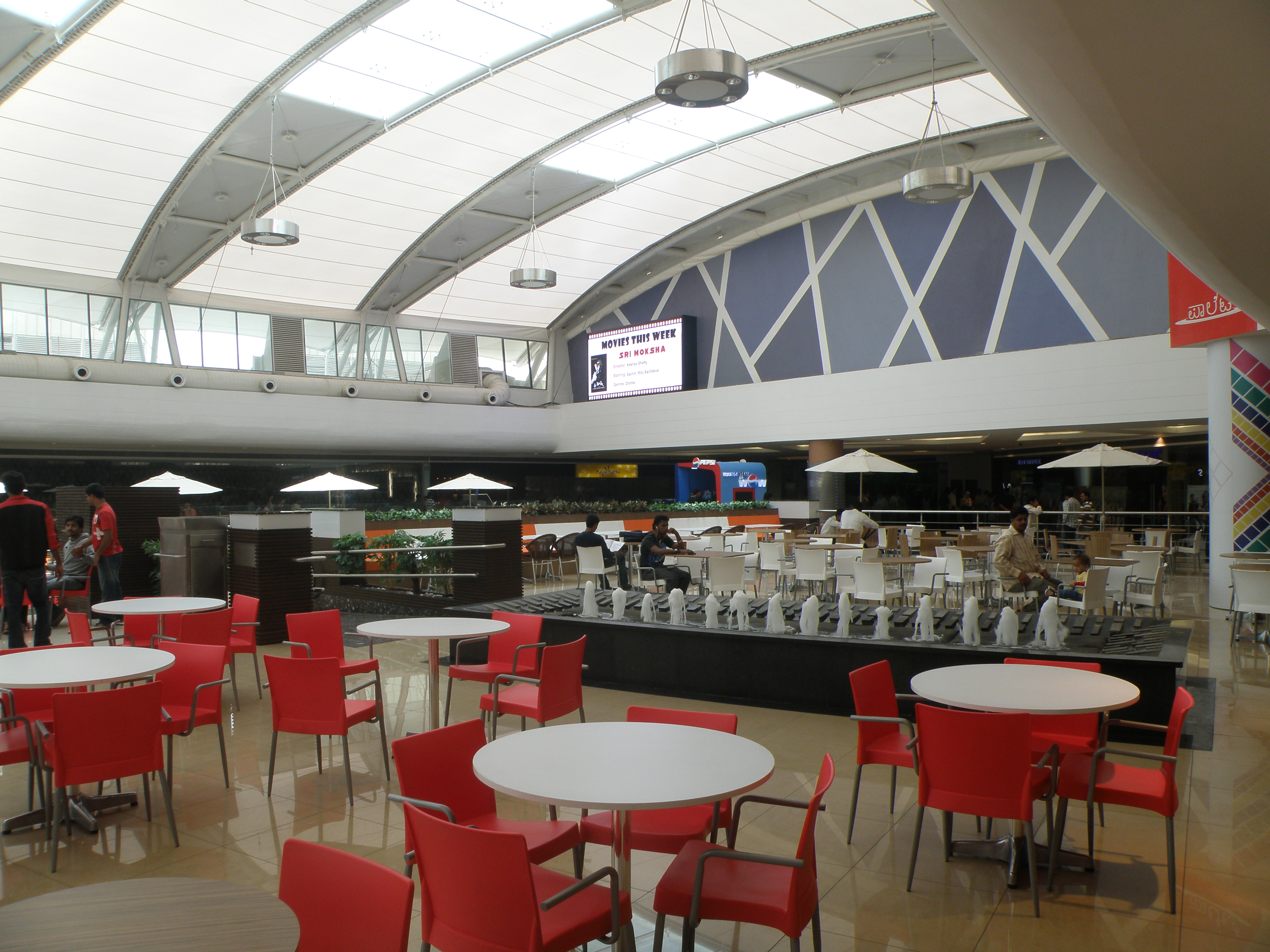
Mantri Square Food court seating

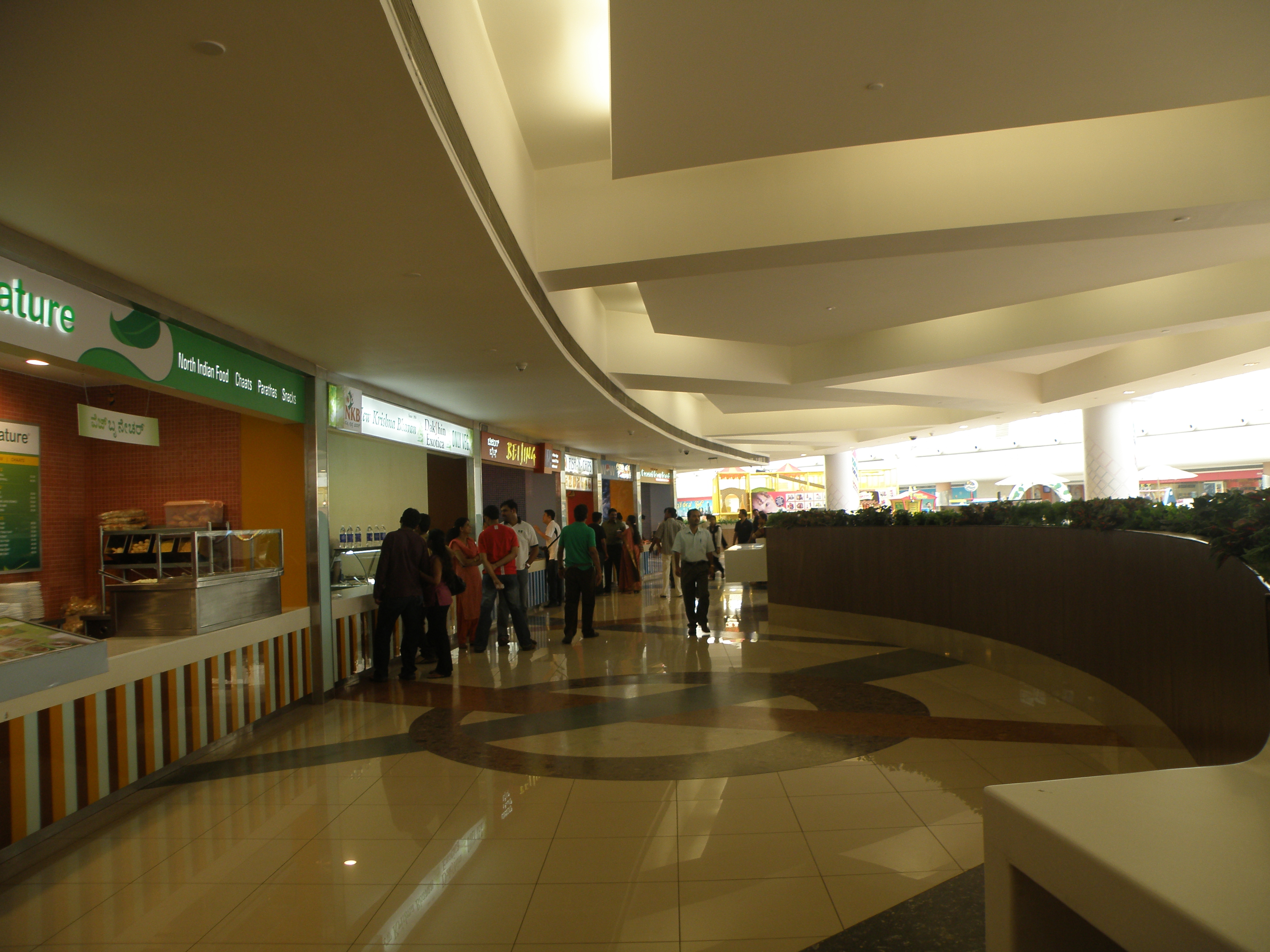
Mantri Square food court stalls

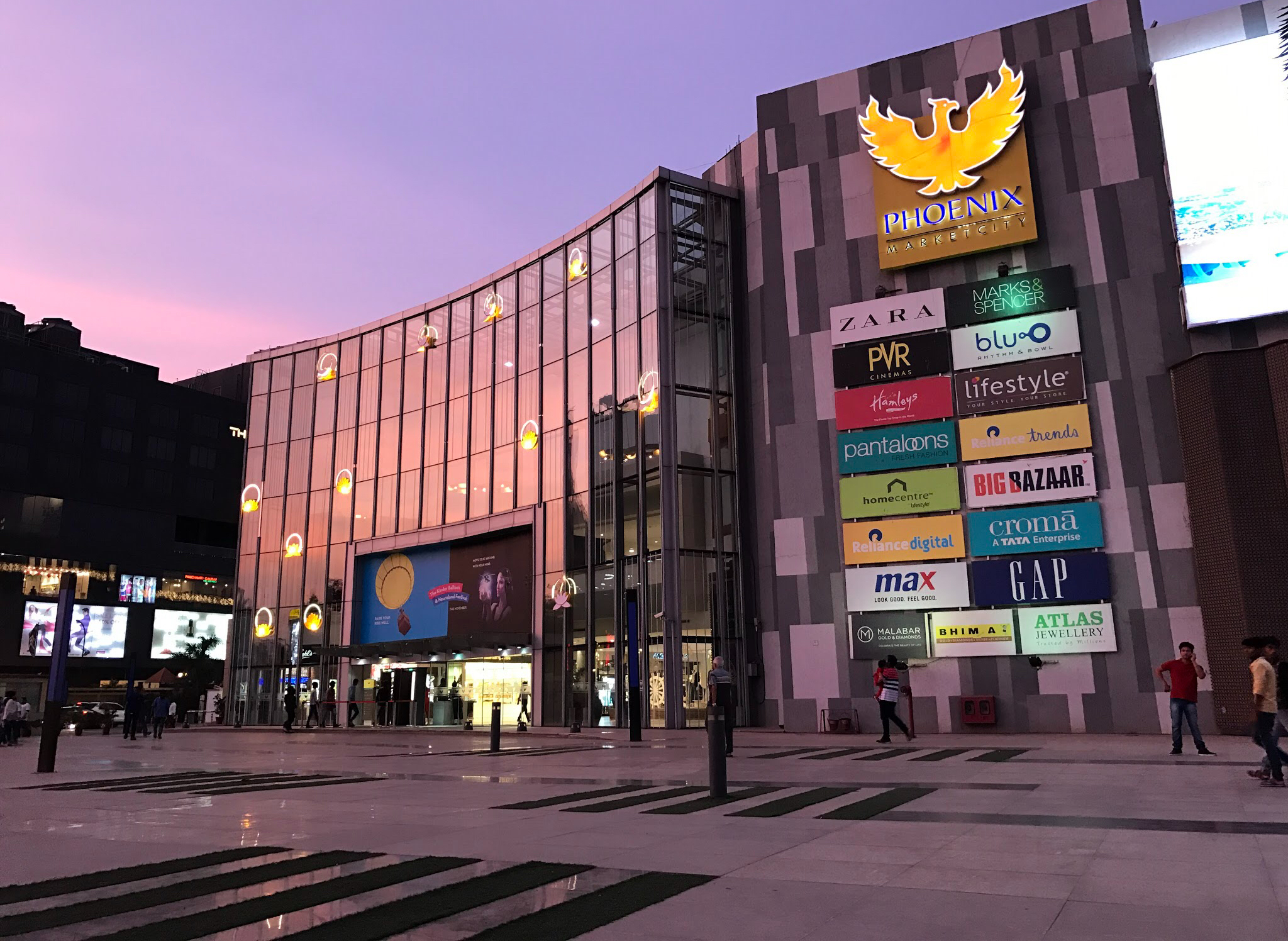
Phoenix Market City (Bangalore)

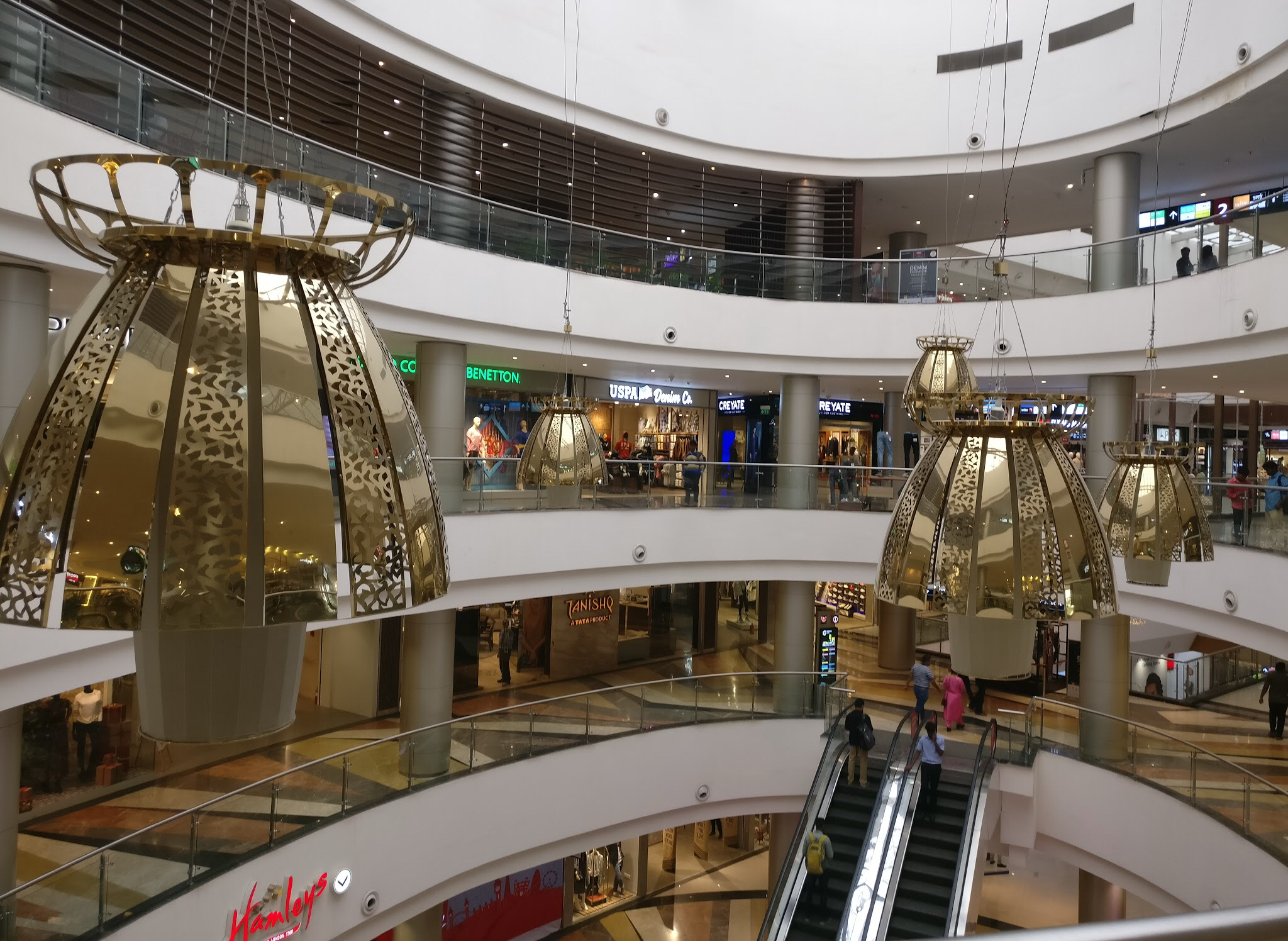
Phoenix Market City (Bangalore) inside view

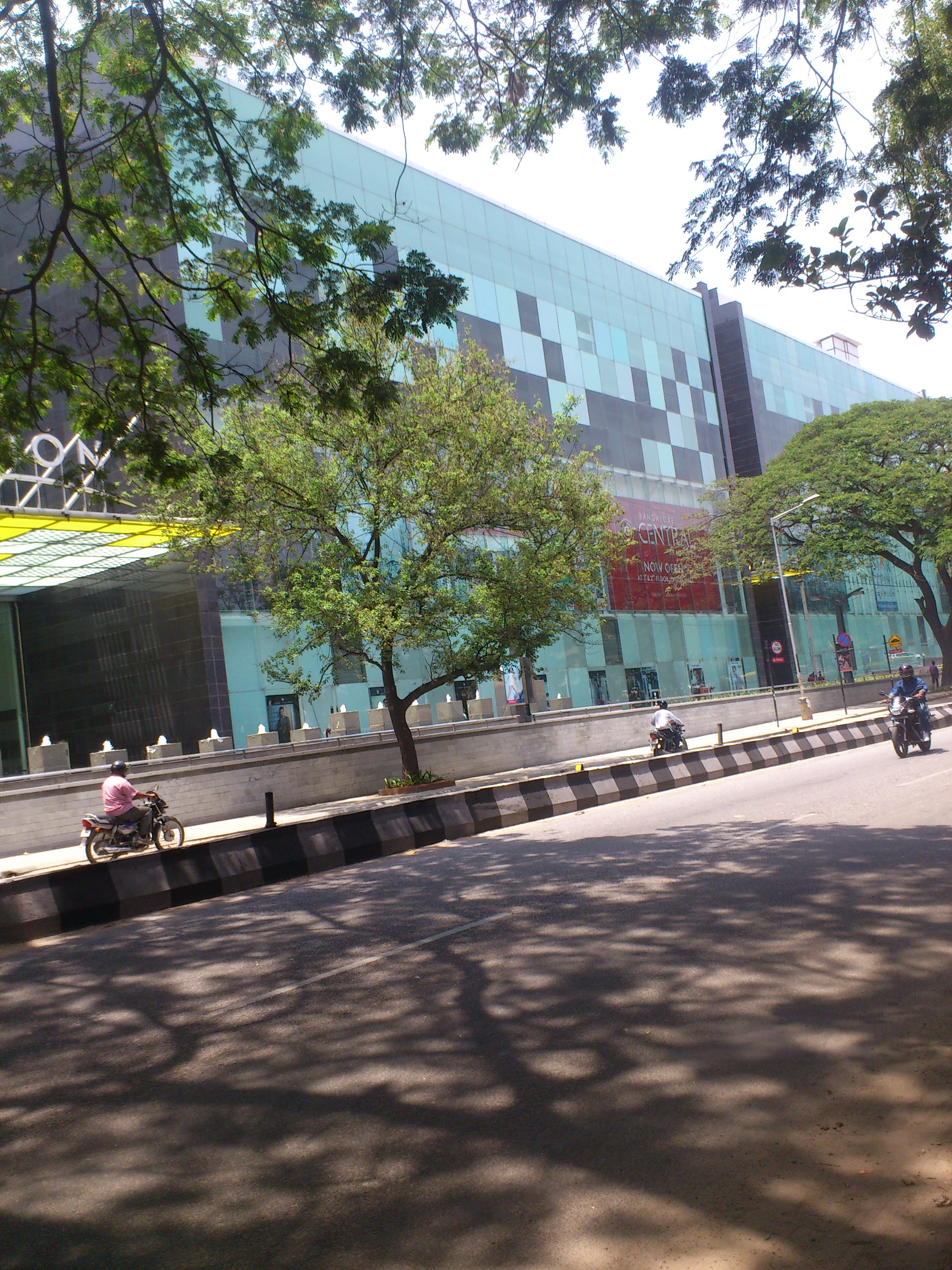
Orion Mall is the second largest mall in Bangaluru

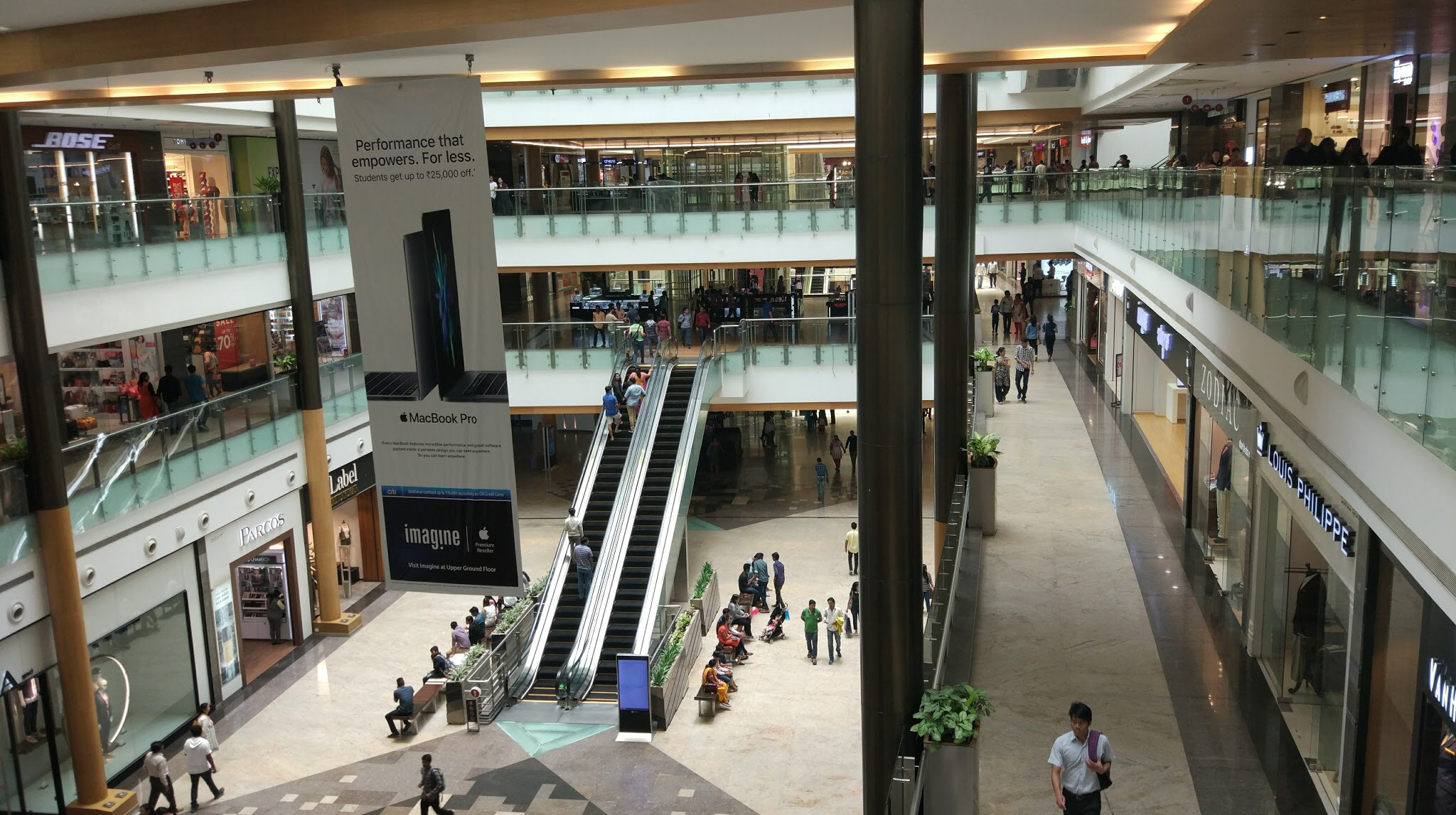
Inside view of Orion Mall

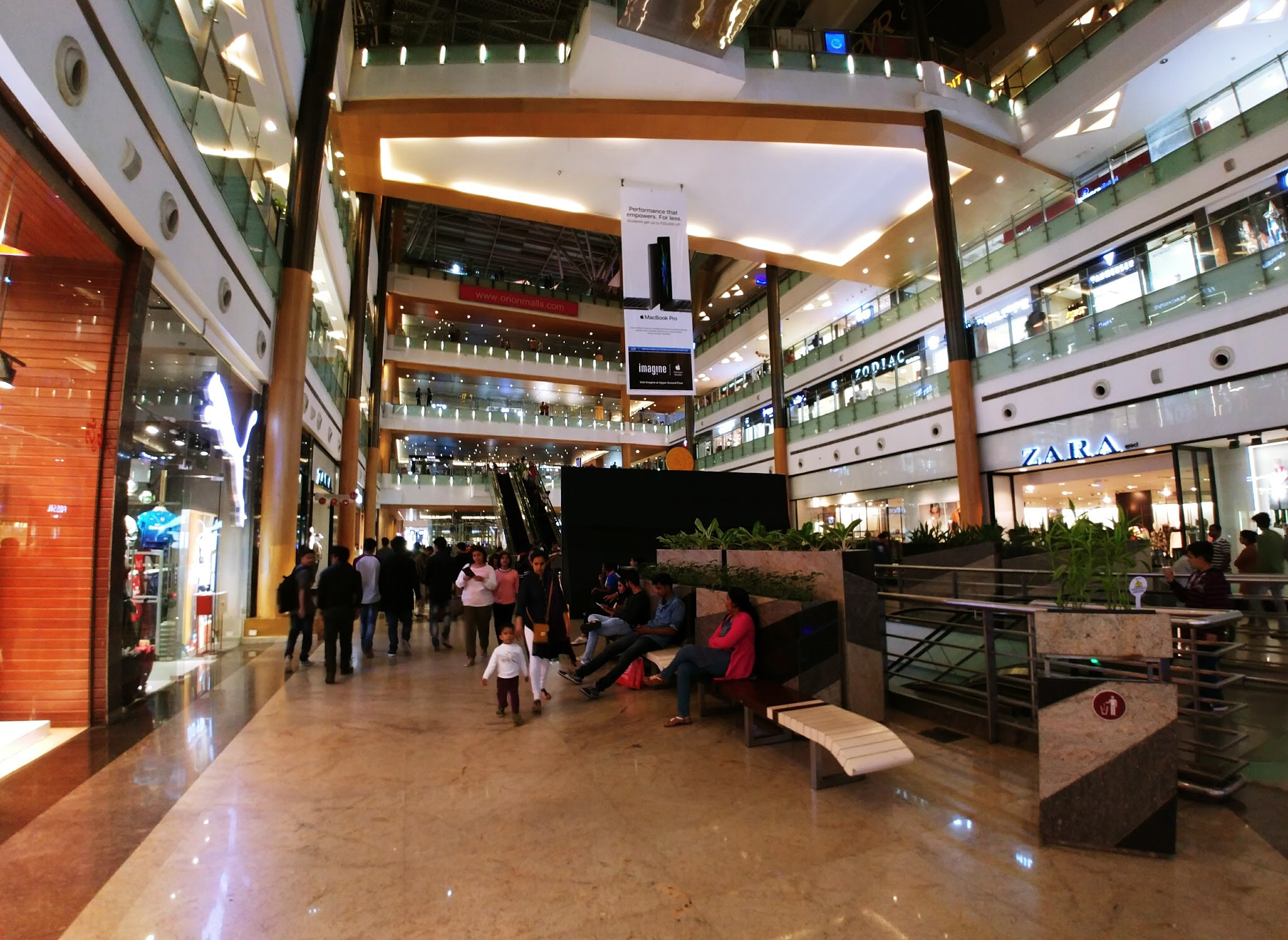
Internal view of Orion Mall

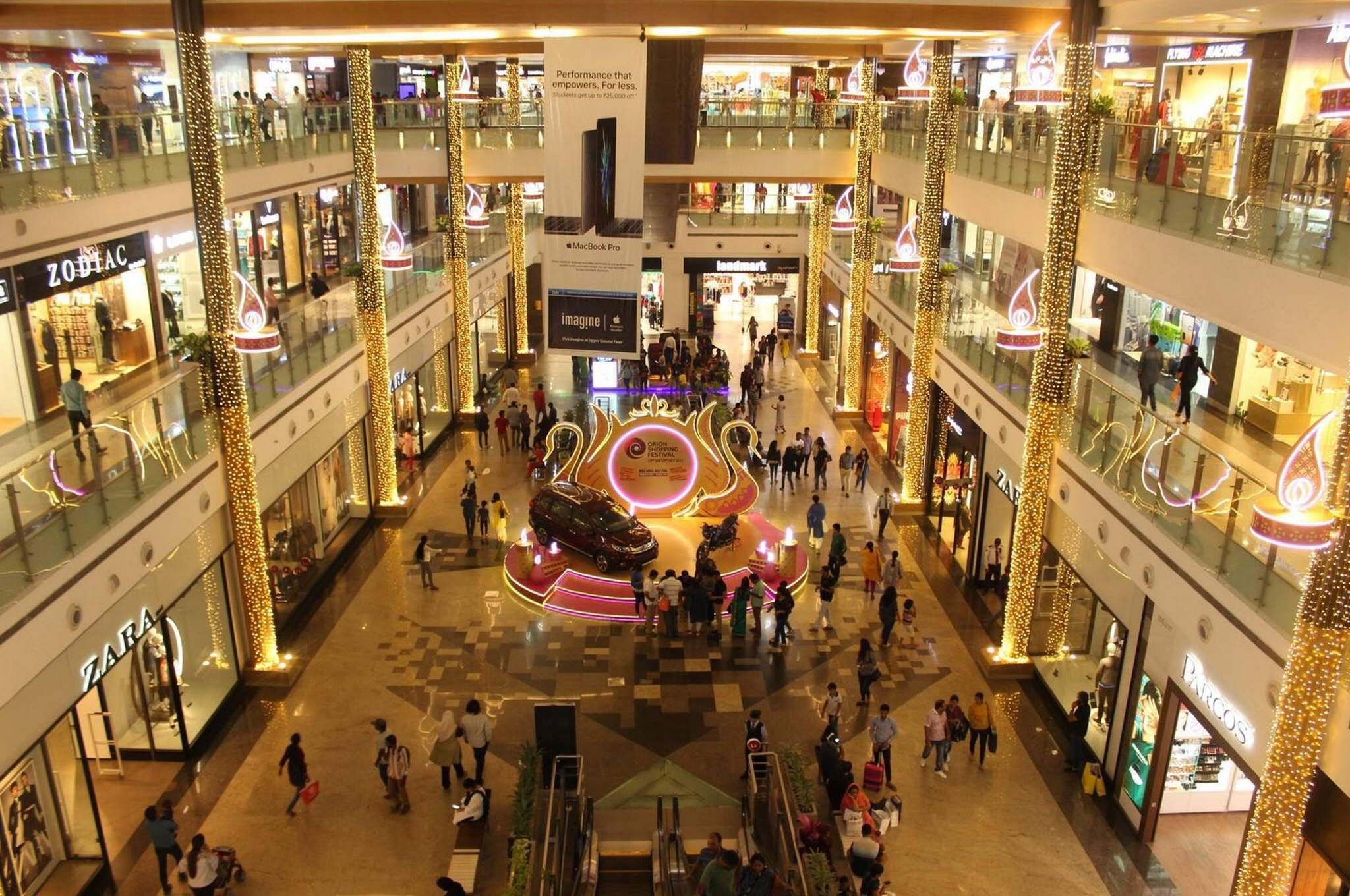
Interior view of Orion Mall

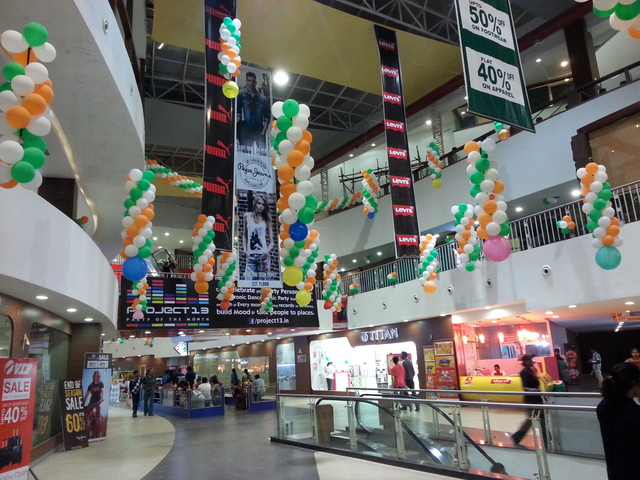
Inside view, Urban Oasis Mall, Hubli

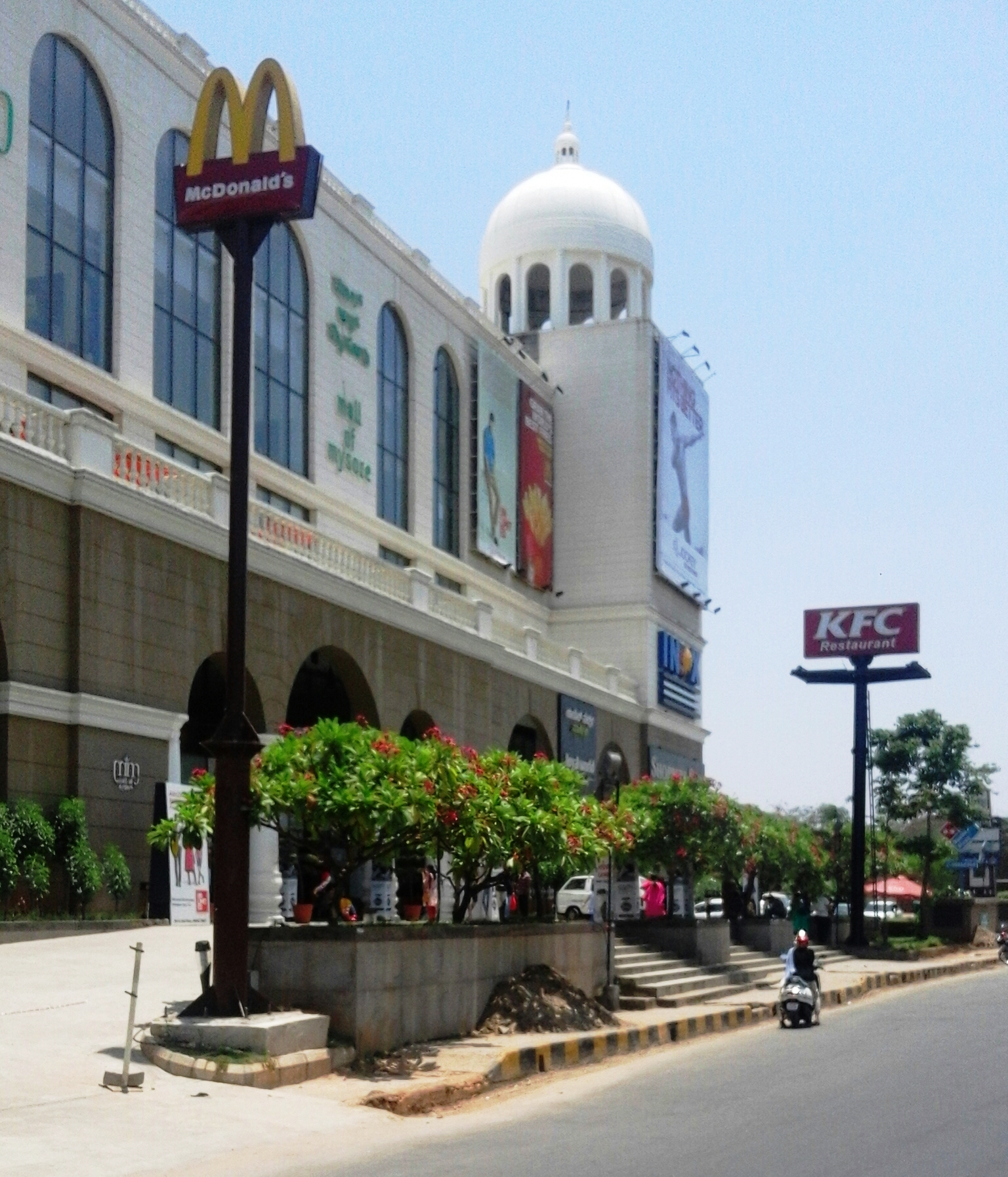
Mall of Mysore Front view

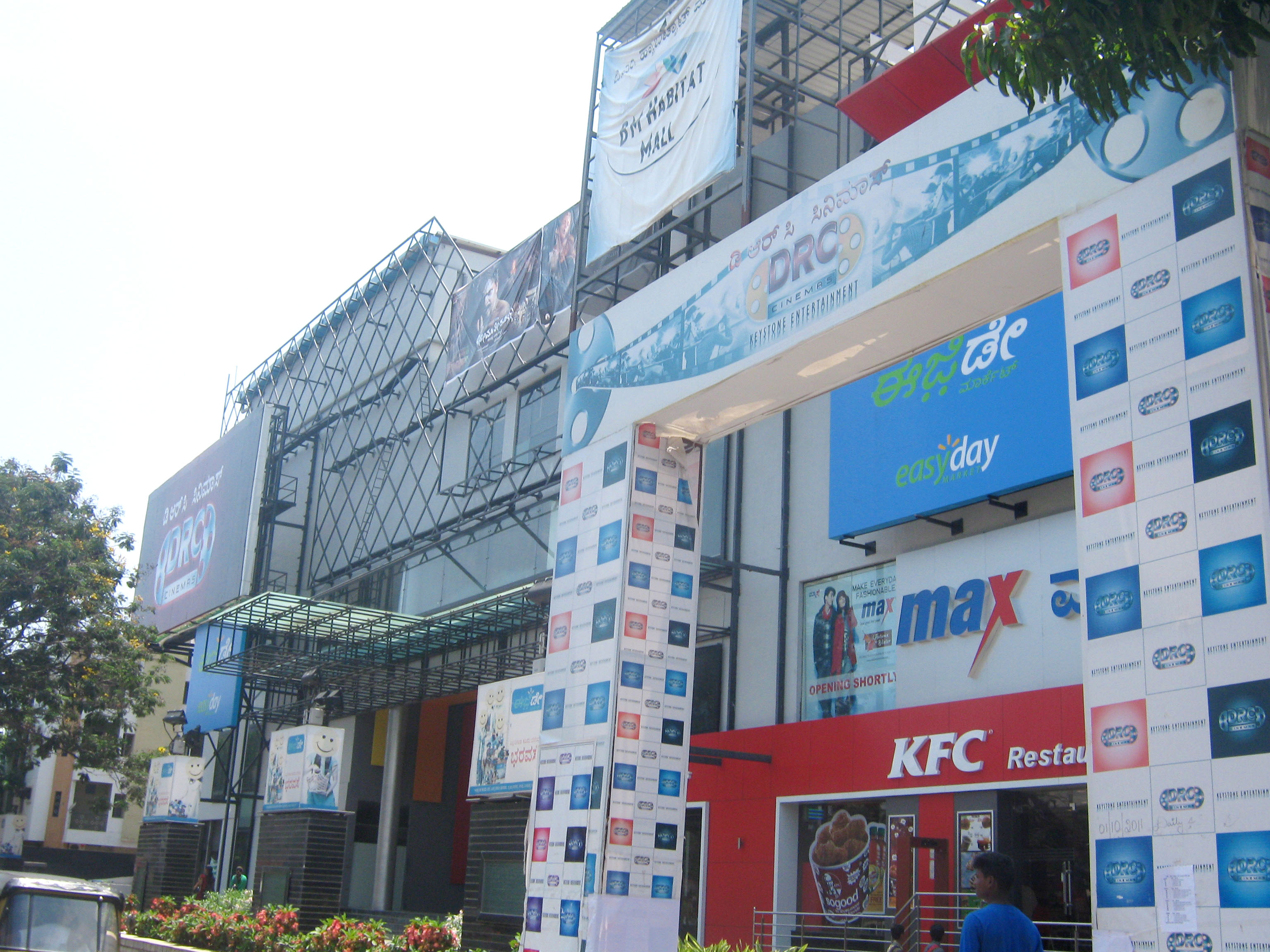
Exterior view, BM Habitat Mall, Mysuru

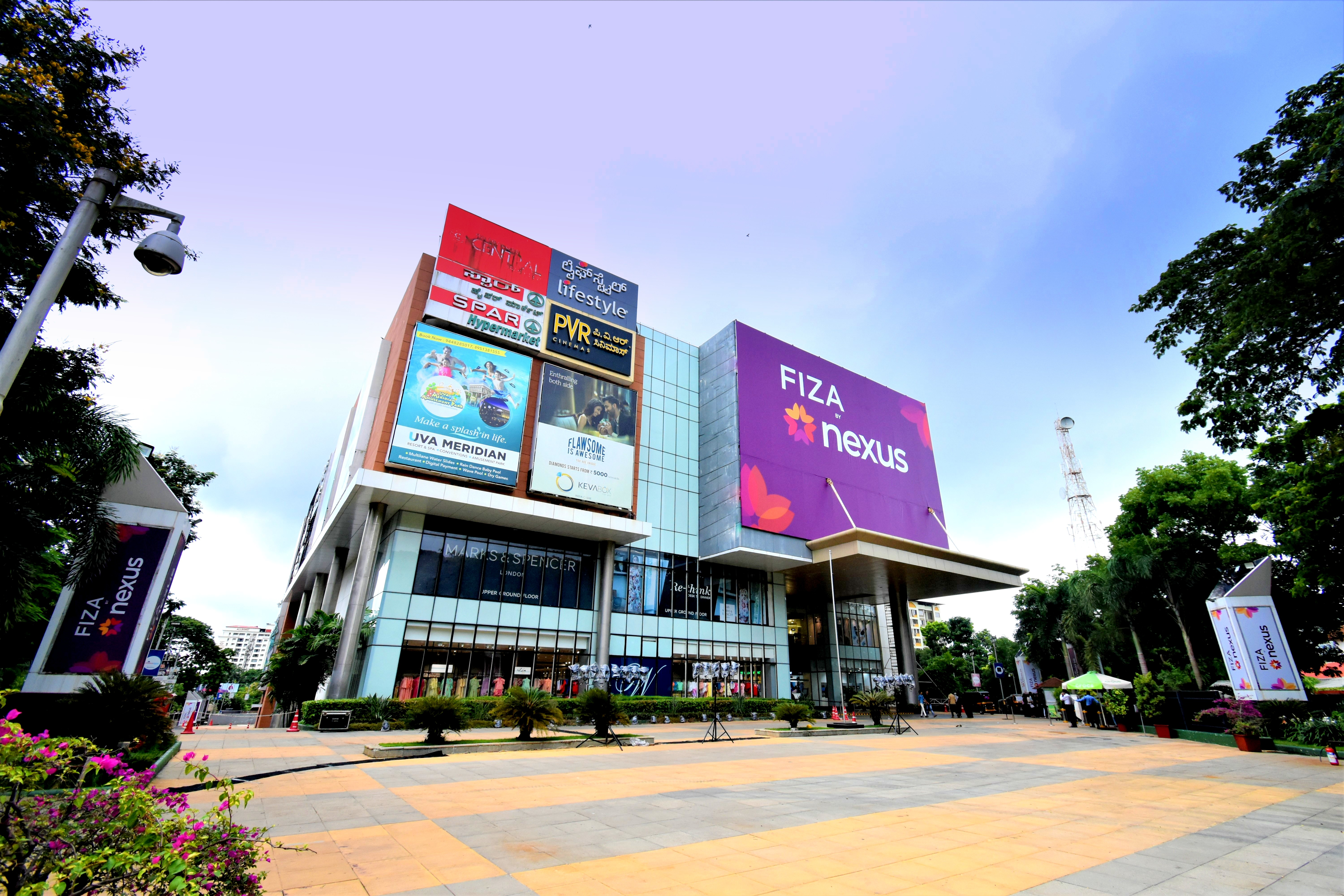
Fiza by Nexus Front view

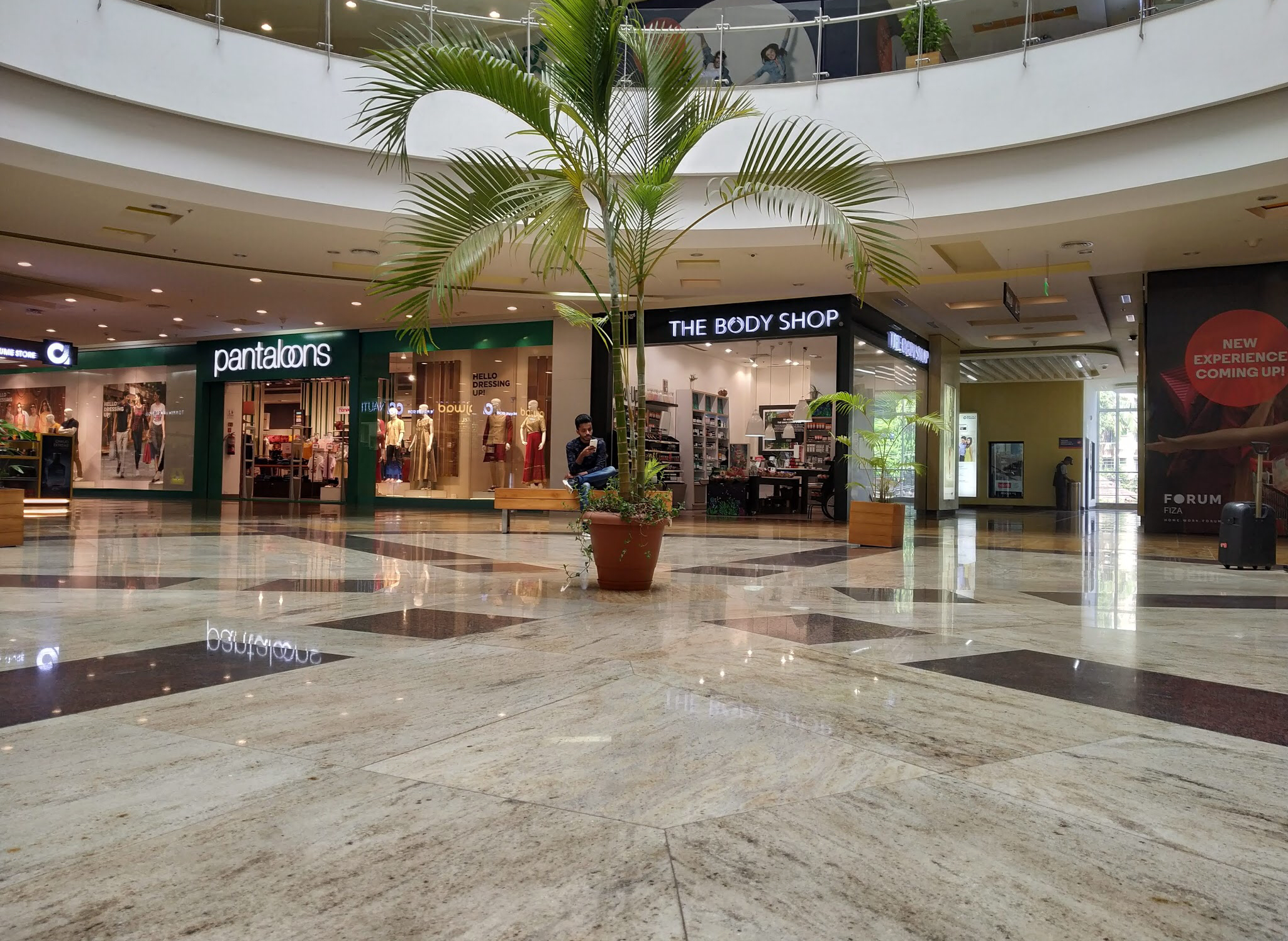
Interior view of Fiza by Nexus, Mangaluru

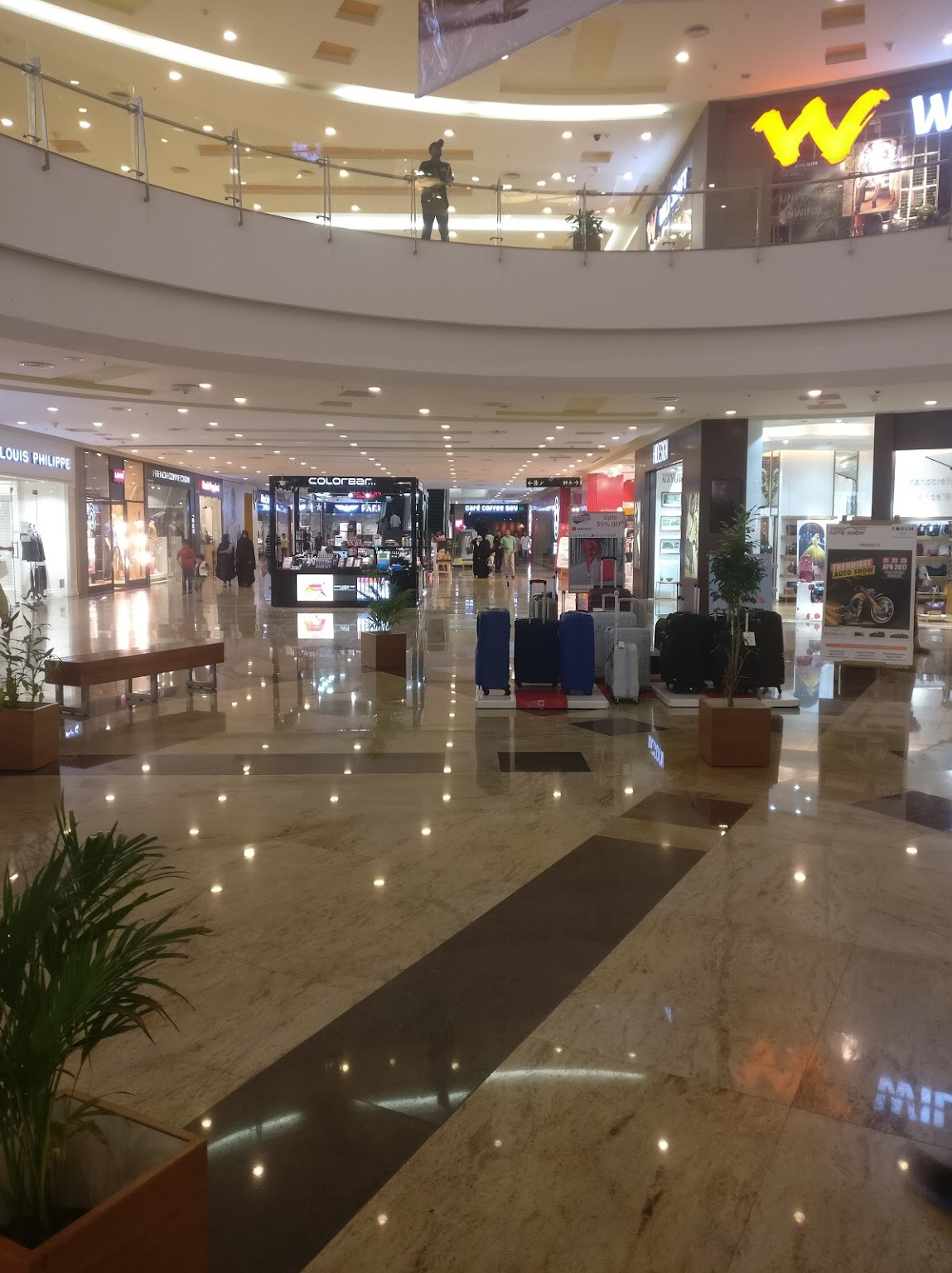
Inside view of Fiza by Nexus, Mangaluru

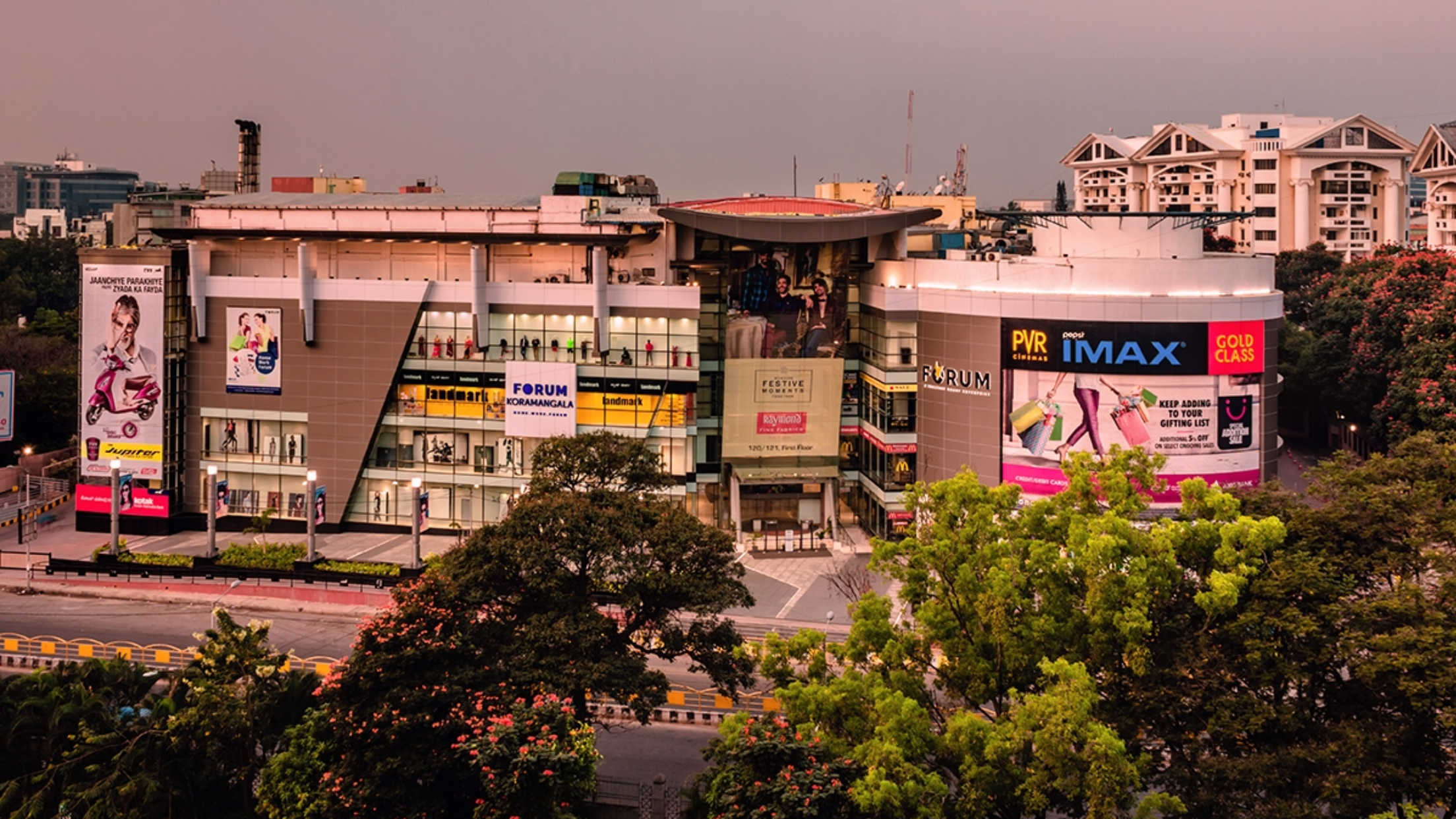
Aerial view of Nexus Koramangala, Bengaluru

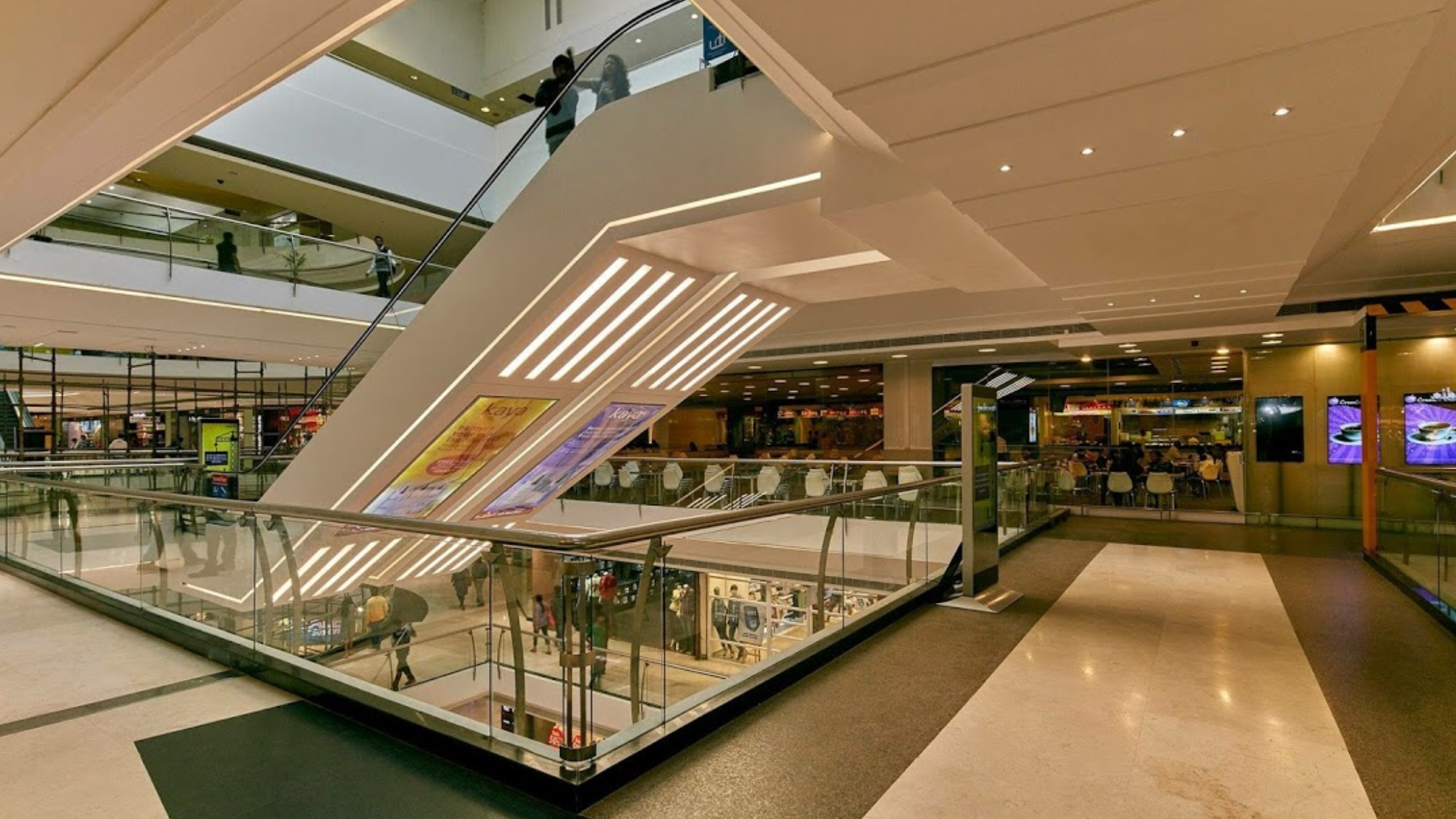
Inside Nexus Koramangala, Bengaluru

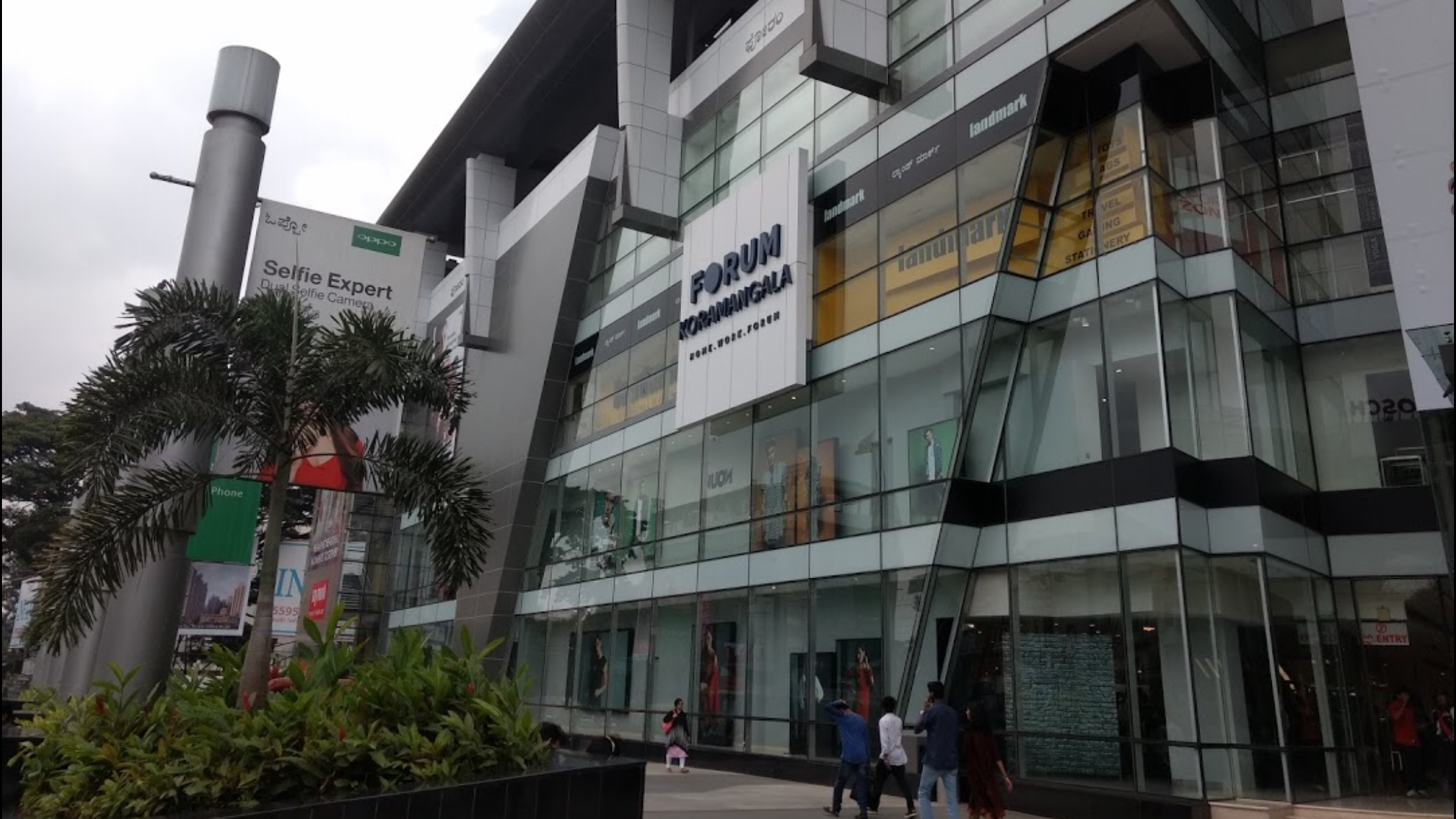
Outside view of Nexus Koramangala, Bengaluru

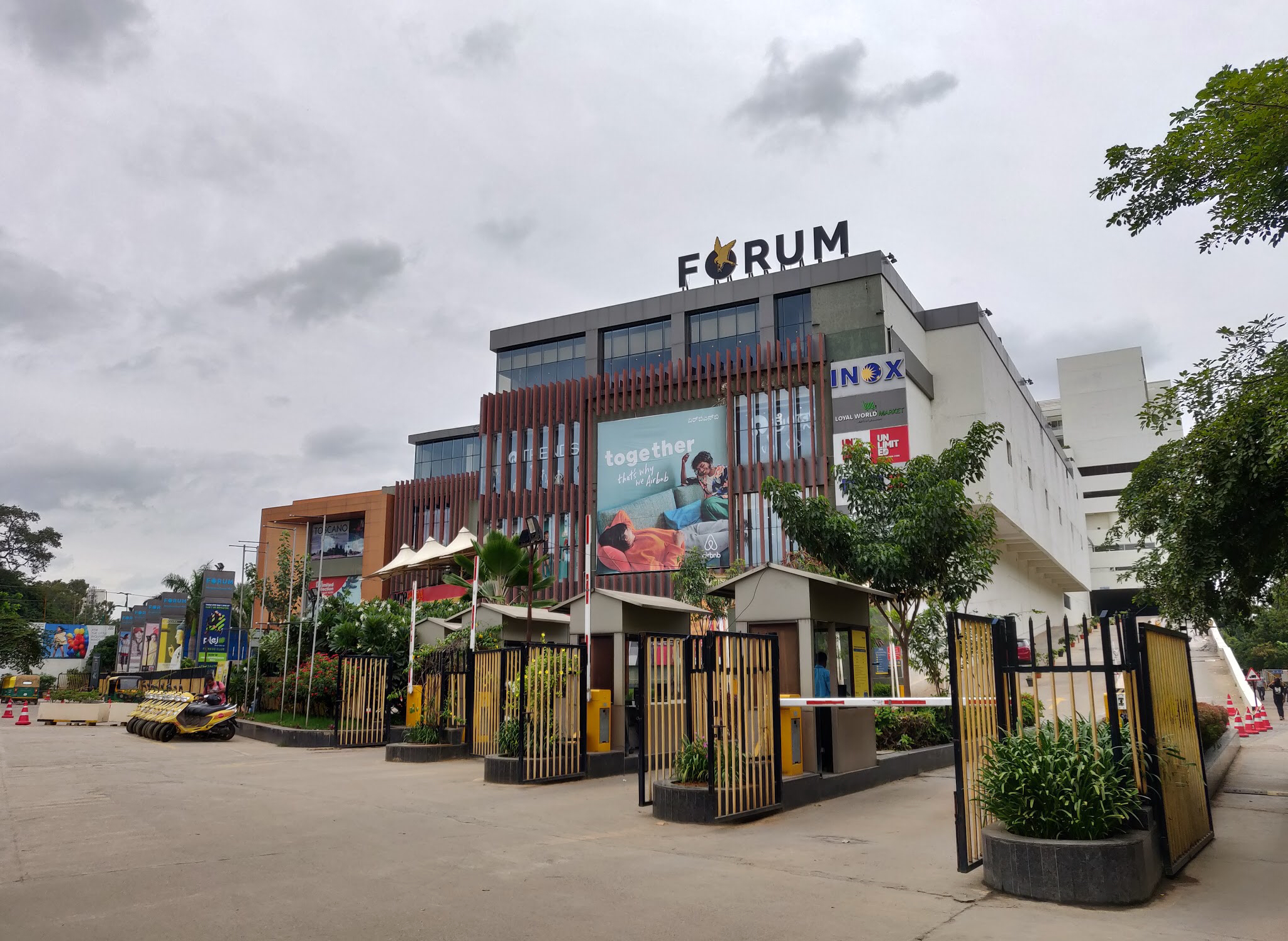
Nexus Whitefield Mall, Bengaluru

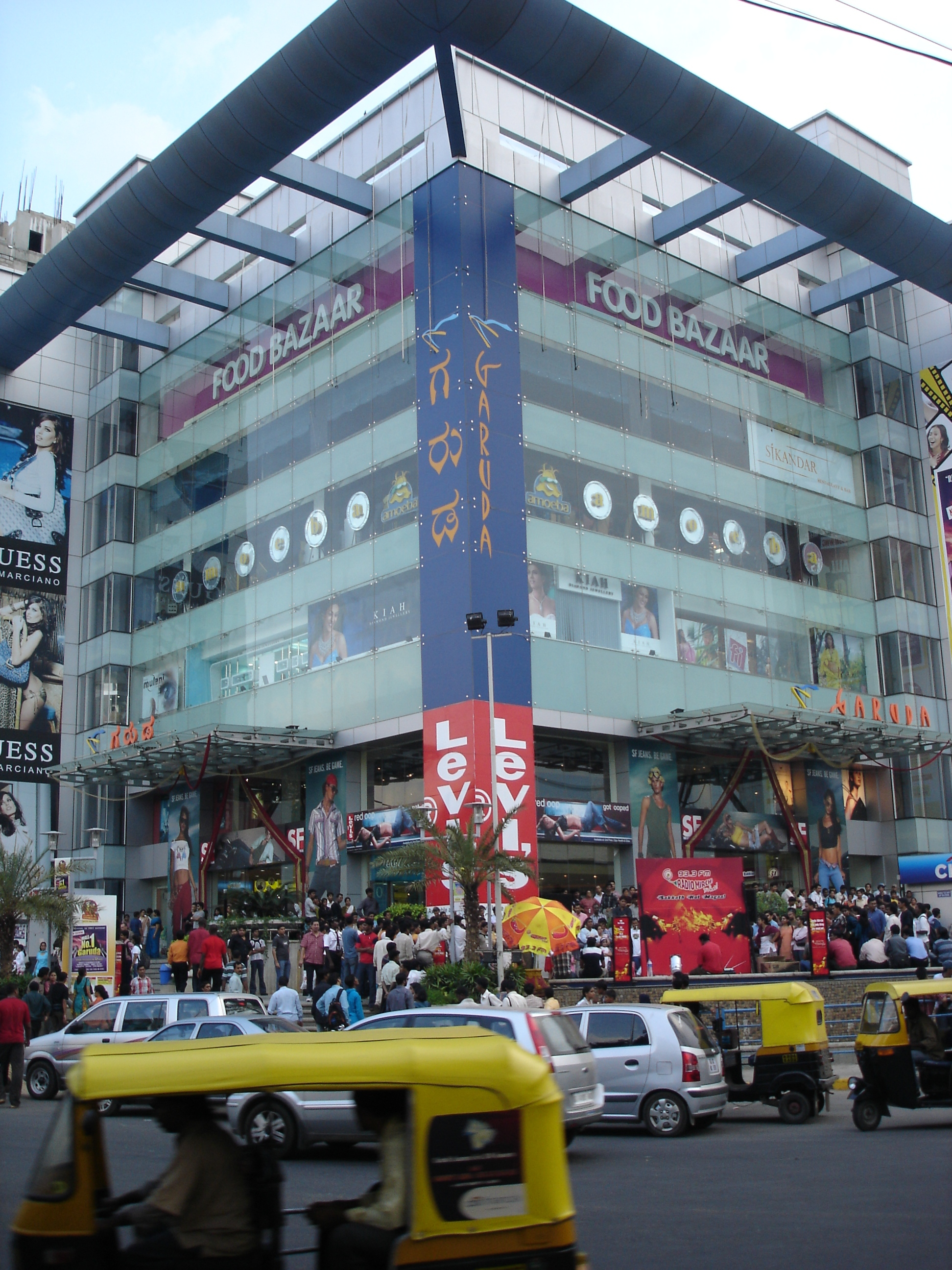
Garuda Mall Entrance, Bengaluru

== Kerala ==
| Name | Location | Year | Size (gross leasable area) | Source |
|---|---|---|---|---|
| Lulu Mall, Thiruvananthapuram | Aakkulam, Thiruvananthapuram | 2021 | 2,200,003 sq ft (204,387.0 m^{2}) | |
| Lulu Mall, Kochi | Edapally, Kochi | 2013 | 2,000,000 sq ft (190,000 m^{2}) | |
| Hilite Mall, Kozhikode | Poovangal, Kozhikode | 2015 | 1,260,000 sq ft (117,000 m^{2}) | |
| Forum Mall Kochi | Maradu, Kochi | 2023 | 1,060,000 sq ft (98,000 m^{2}) | |
| Mall of Travancore | Enchakkal, Thiruvananthapuram | 2018 | 650,000 sq ft (60,000 m^{2}) | |
| Centre Square Mall, Kochi | MG Road, Kochi | 2013 | 630,000 sq ft (59,000 m^{2}) | |
| Oberon Mall | Edapally, Kochi | 2008 | 350,000 sq ft (33,000 m^{2}) | |
| Sobha City Mall | Puzhakkal, Thrissur | 2015 | 450,000 sq ft (42,000 m^{2}) | |
| Dreams Mall, Kollam | Kottiyam, Kollam | 2024 | 250,000 sq ft (23,000 m^{2}) | |
| Selex Mall, Thrissur | East Fort, Thrissur | 2014 | 215,000 sq ft (20,000 m^{2}) | |
| Y Mall, Thriprayar | Triprayar, Thrissur | 2018 | 205,000 sq ft (19,000 m^{2}) | |
| Mall of Joy, Kottayam | Baker Junction, Kottayam | 2016 | 200,000 sq ft (19,000 m^{2}) | |
| Abad Nucleus Mall | Maradu, Kochi | 2010 | 125,000 sq ft (11,600 m^{2}) | |
| Lulu Mall, Kozhikode | Mankave, Kozhikode | 2024 | 350,000 sq ft (33,000 m^{2}) | |
| Lulu Mall, Palakkad | Kannadi, Palakkad | 2024 | 200,000 sq ft (19,000 m^{2}) | |
| H&J Mall | Karunagapally, Kollam | 2015 | 120,000 sq ft (11,000 m^{2}) | |
| Reliance Centro Mall(Artech World Mall) | Vanchiyoor, Thiruvananthapuram | 2018 | 100,000 sq ft (9,300 m^{2}) | |
| RP Mall, Kozhikode | Mavoor Road, Kozhikode | 2012 | 100,000 sq ft (9,300 m^{2}) | |
| RP Mall, Kollam | Chinnakada, Kollam | 2012 | 100,000 sq ft (9,300 m^{2}) | |
| Hala Mall, Puthanathani | Puthanathani, Malappuram | 2022 | 80,000 sq ft (7,400 m^{2}) | |
| Hilite Mall, Thrissur | Kutanellur, Thrissur | 2024 | | |

Lulu Mall, Kochi is one of the largest shopping malls in India

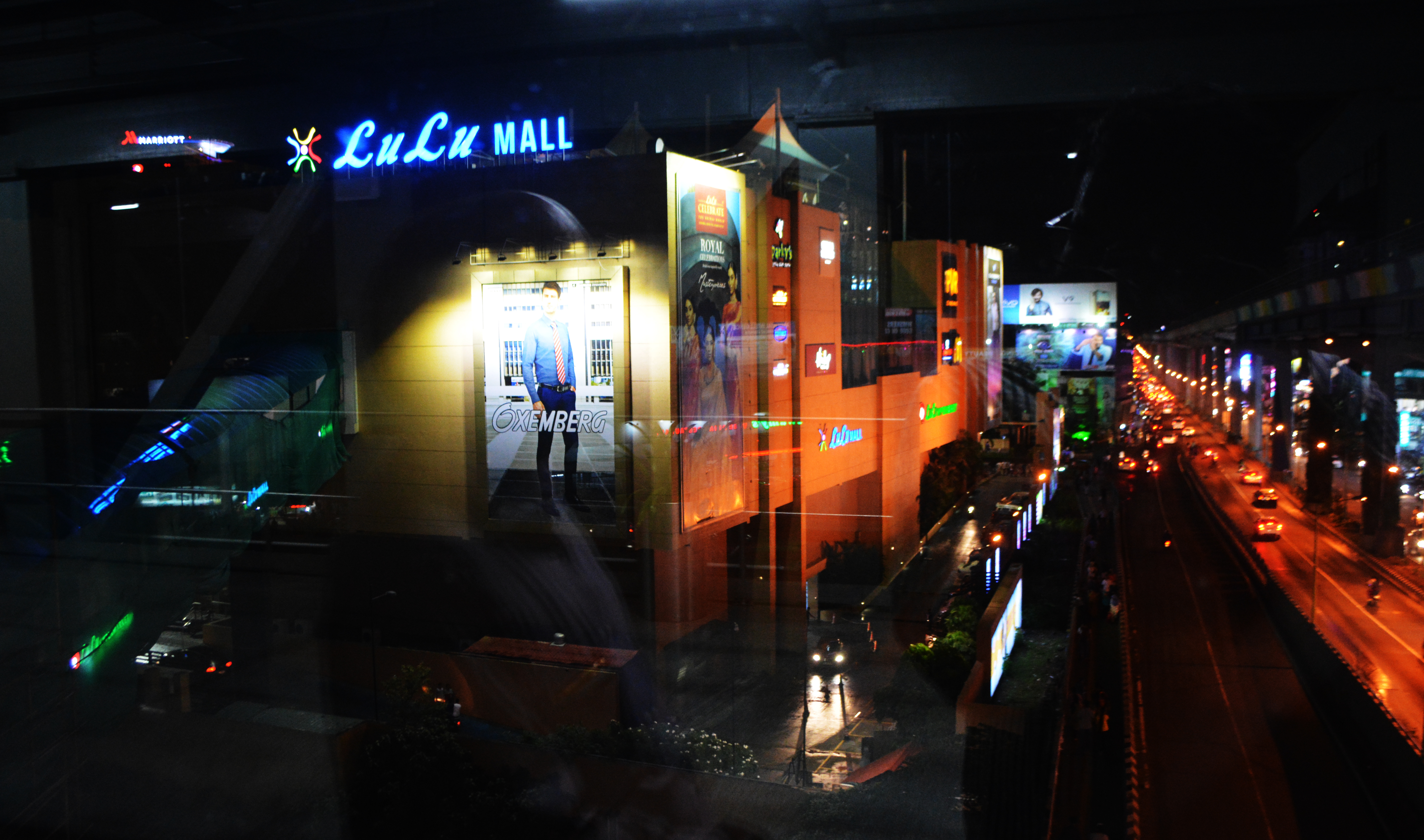
Lulu Mall view from Edapally Metro station at Kochi, Kerala, India at night

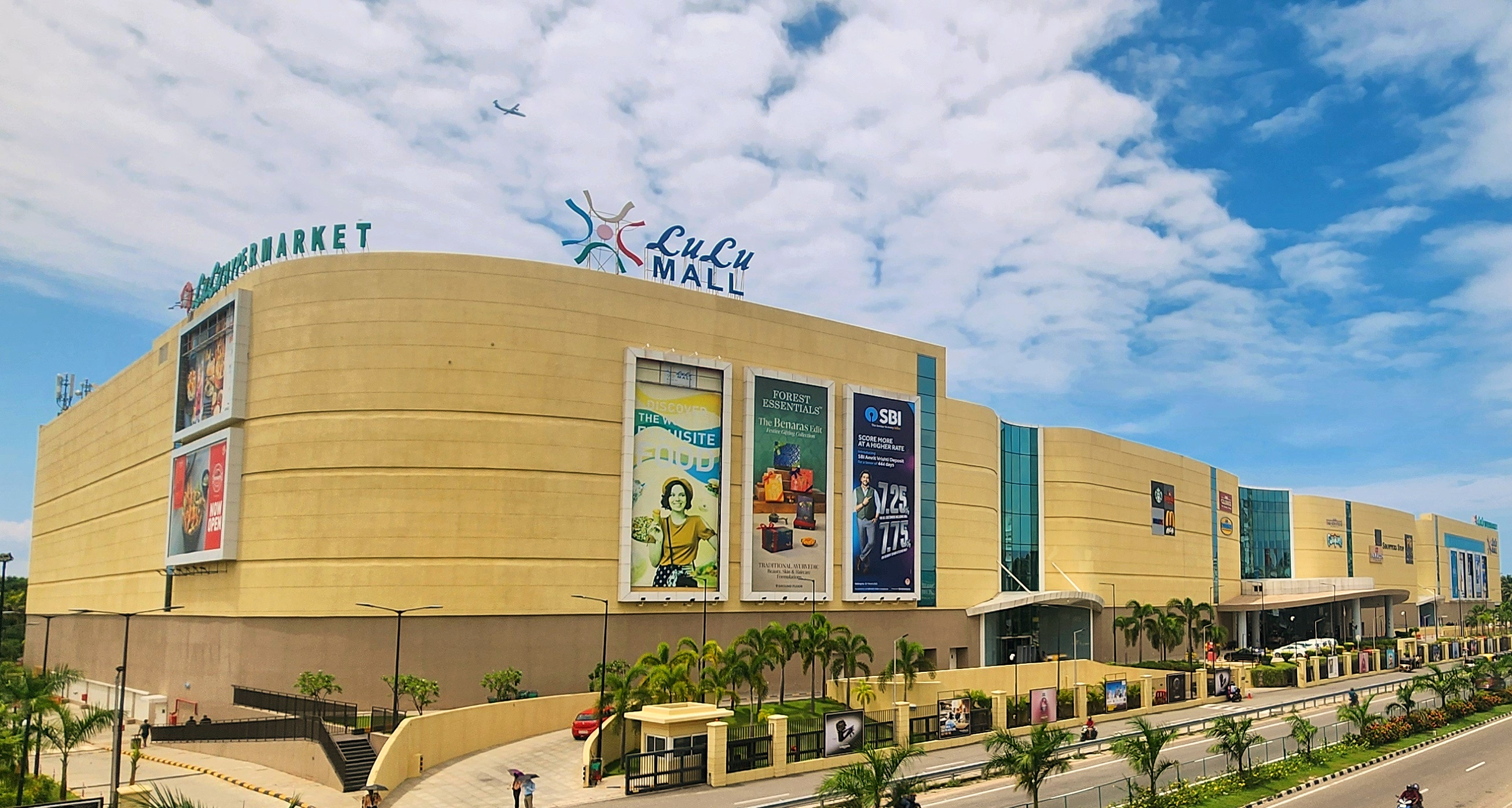
Lulu Mall, Thiruvananthapuram outside view

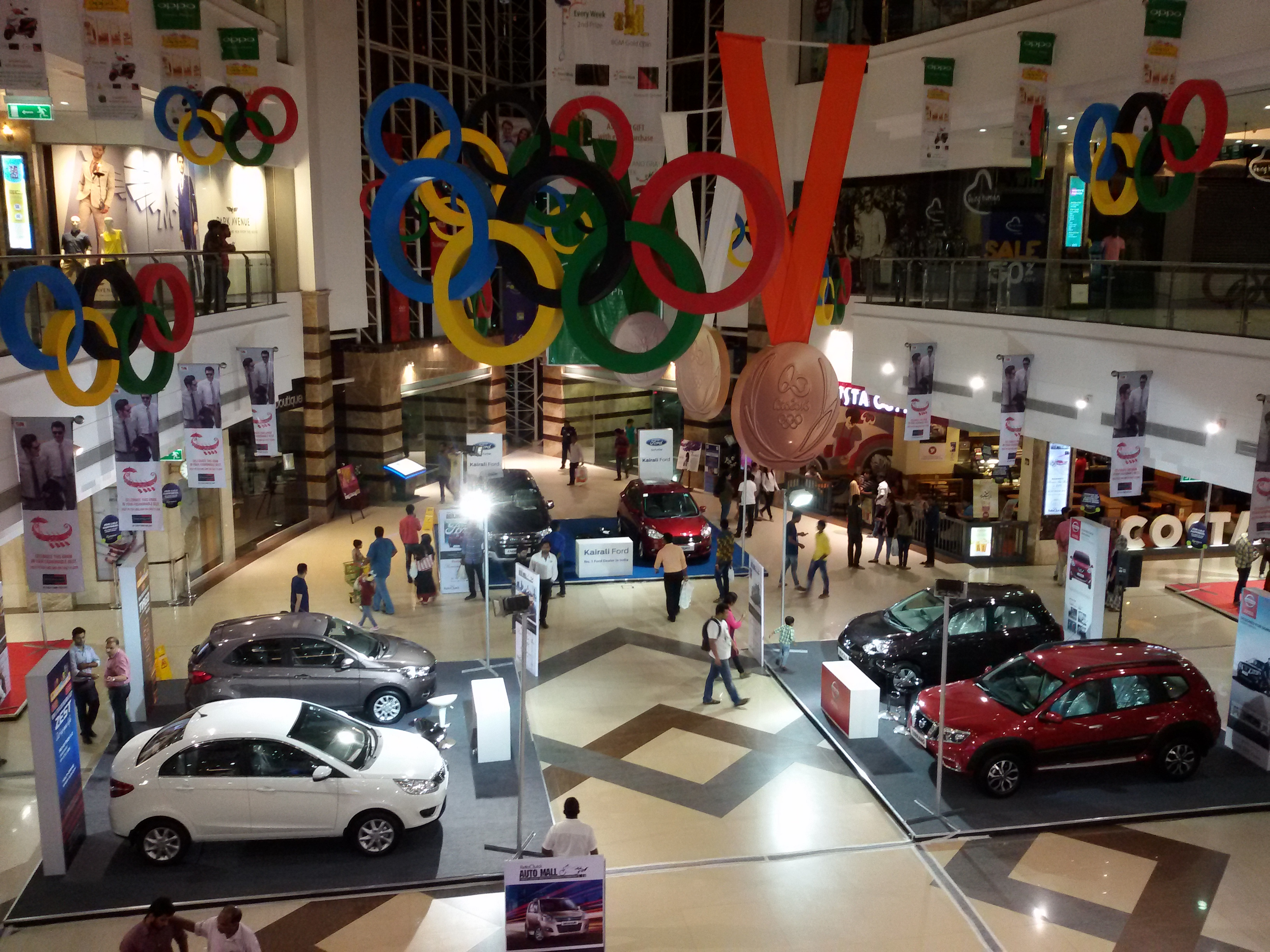
Lulu Mall, Kochi inside view

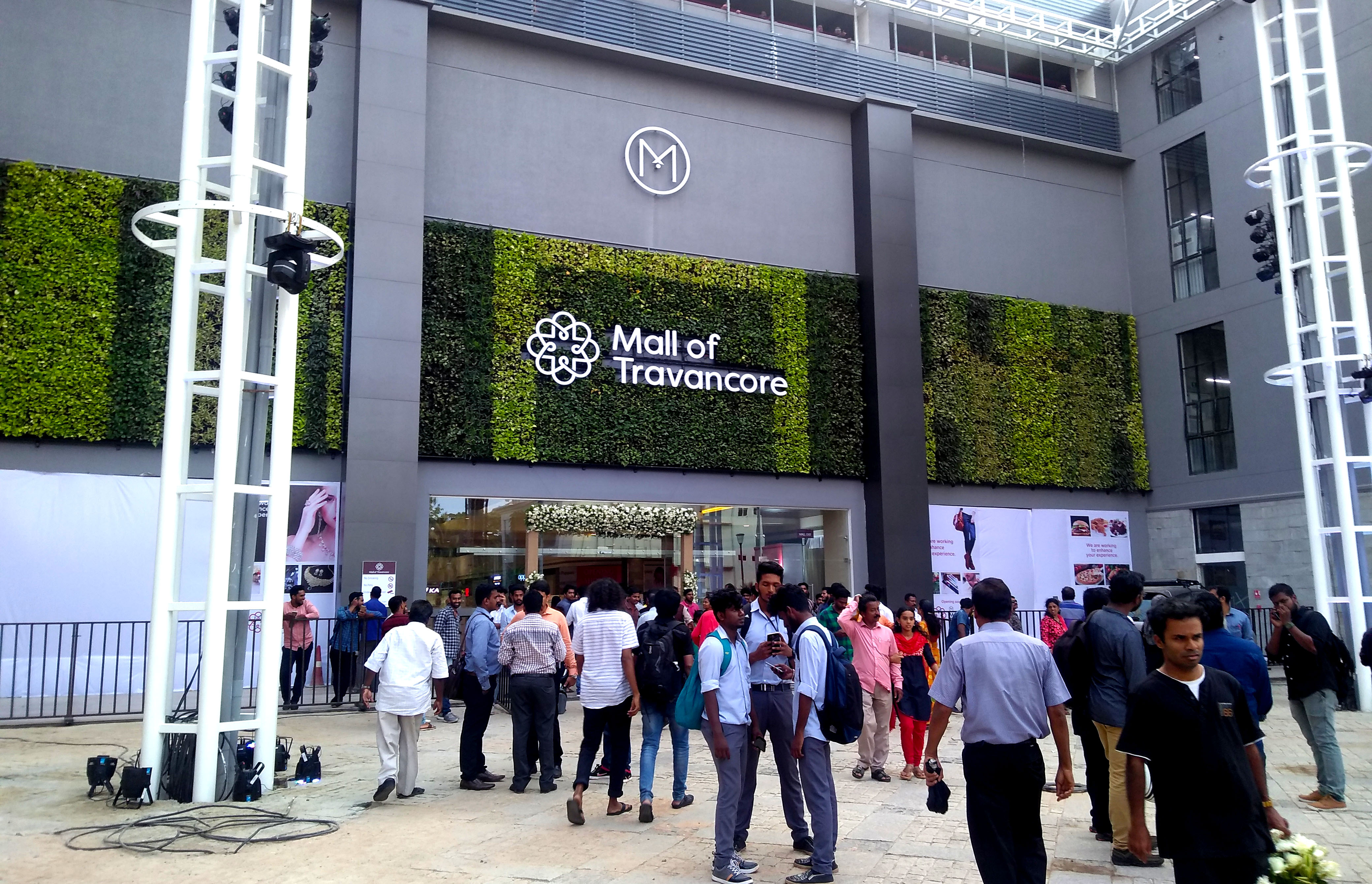
Mall of Travancore in Chacka, Thiruvananthapuram

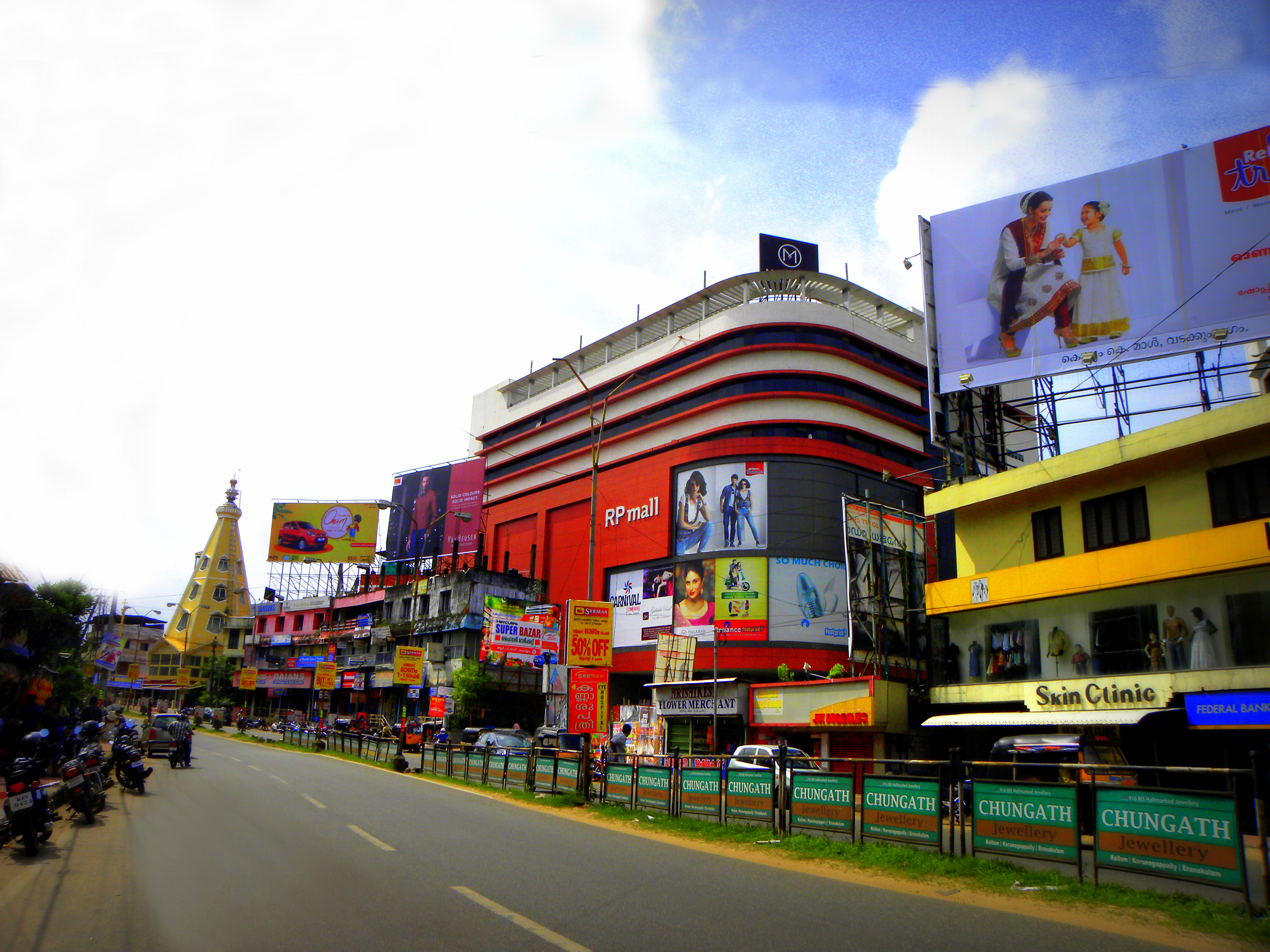
RP Mall in Downtown, Kollam

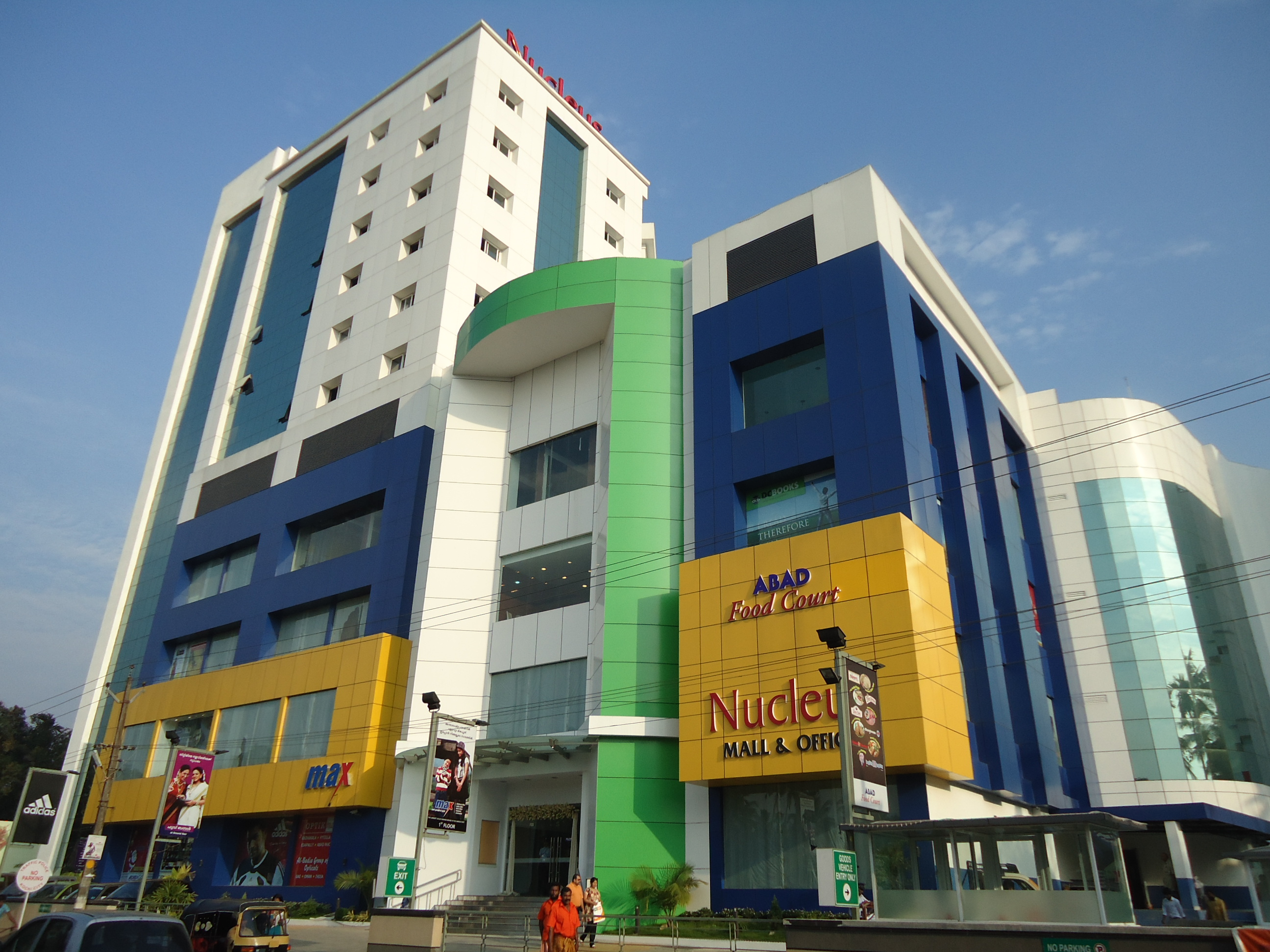
Abad Nucleus Mall in Maradu, Kochi

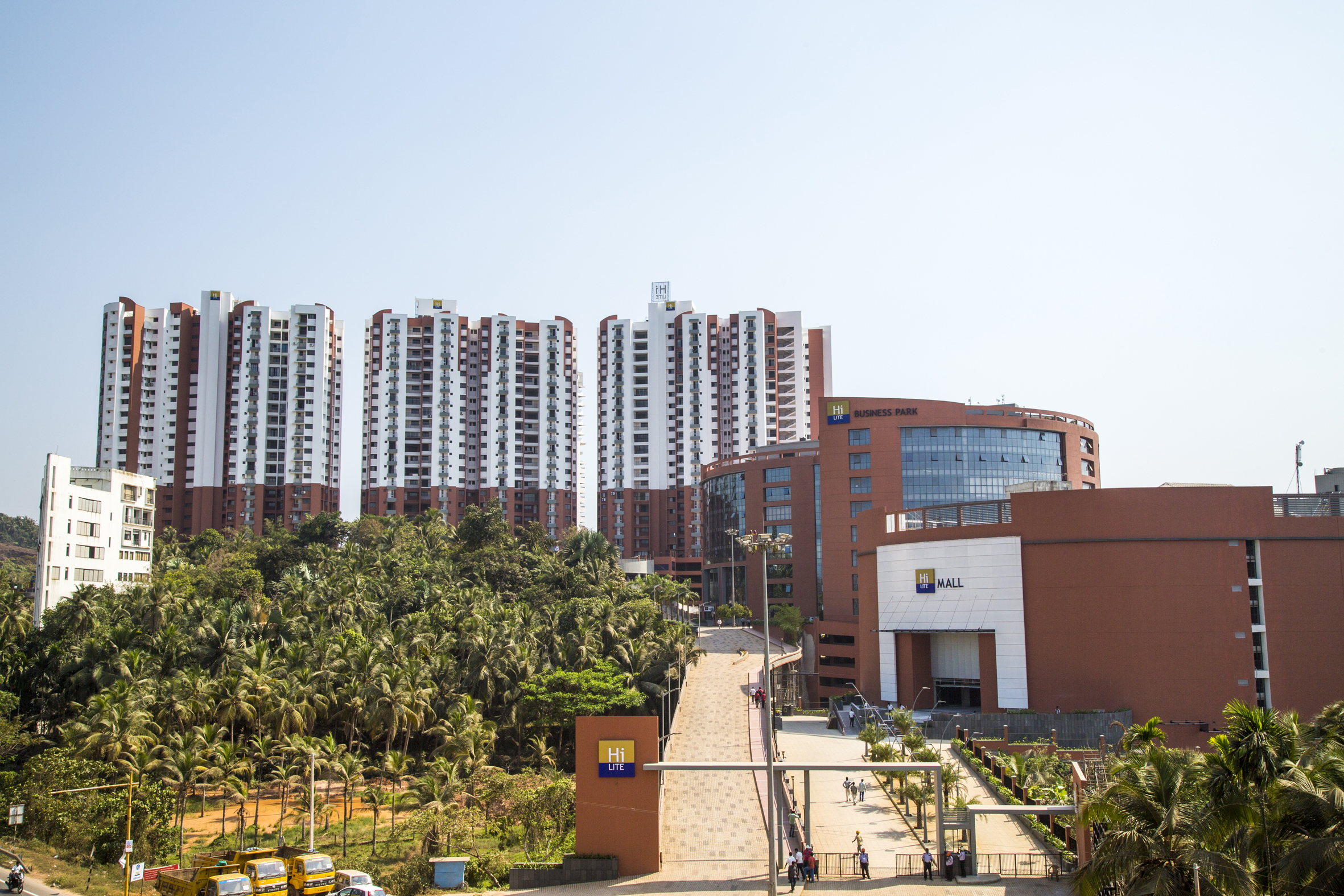
Hilite Mall, Kozhikode is the largest mall in northern Kerala

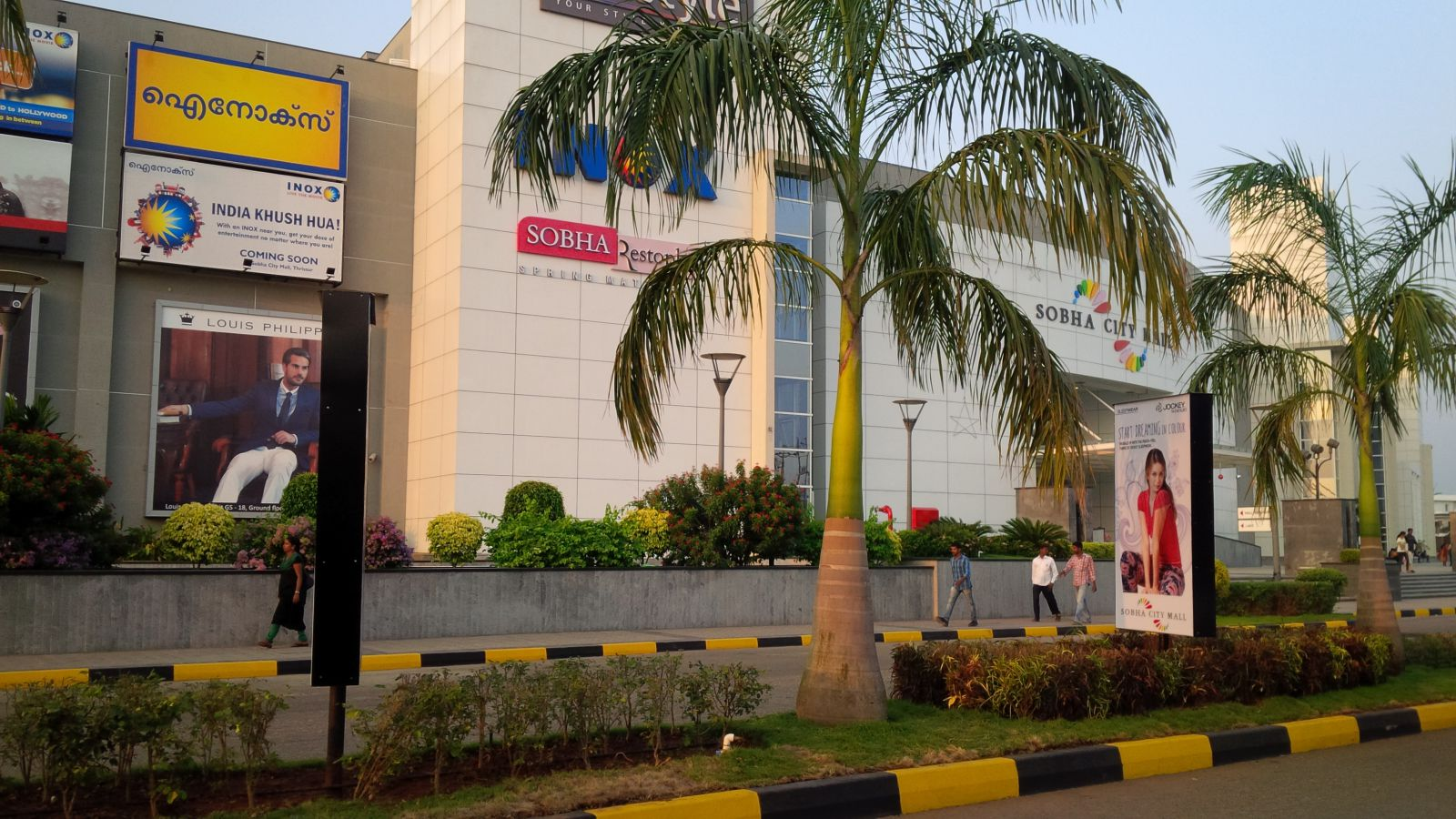
Sobha City Mall in Puzhakkal, Thrissur

== Madhya Pradesh ==
| Name | Location | Year | Size (gross leasable area) | Source |
|---|---|---|---|---|
| DB City Mall, Bhopal | Maharana Pratap Nagar, Bhopal | 2010 | 1,200,000 sq ft (110,000 m^{2}) | |
| Phoenix Citadel Mall | MR-10 Junction, Indore | 2022 | 1,000,000 sq ft (93,000 m^{2}) | |
| C21 Malhar Mall, Indore | Scheme No. 54, A.B. Road, Indore | 2009 | 525,000 sq ft (48,800 m^{2}) | |
| Capital Mall | Narmadapuram Road, Bhopal | 2014 | 400,000 sq ft (37,000 m^{2}) | |
| Bansal Plaza | Rani Kamlapati Station Road, Bhopal | 2025 | 400,000 sq ft (37,000 m^{2}) | |
| DB City Mall Gwalior | Racecourse Road, Gwalior | 2018 | 350,000 sq ft (33,000 m^{2}) | |
| Cosmos Mall | Nana Kheda, Ujjain | 2011 | 350,000 sq ft (33,000 m^{2}) | |
| Nexus Indore Central Mall | RNT Marg, Indore | 2009 | 250,000 sq ft (23,000 m^{2}) | |
| Kalyan Mart (Kalyan Cinemas) | Dutt Nagar, Indore | 2023 | 250,000 sq ft (23,000 m^{2}) | |
| Mangal City Mall, Indore | Scheme No. 54, A.B. Road, Indore | 2006 | 200,000 sq ft (19,000 m^{2}) | |
| Keshar Towers | Railway Colony, Racecourse Road, Gwalior | 2022 | 200,000 sq ft (19,000 m^{2}) | |
| Nexus Treasure Island Mall, Indore | MG Road, Indore | 2005 | 200,000 sq ft (19,000 m^{2}) | |
| Aura Mall | Trilanga, E-8, Arera Colony, Bhopal | 2014 | 160,000 sq ft (15,000 m^{2}) | |
| Samdariya Mall, Jabalpur | Civic Centre, Malaviya Chowk, Jabalpur | 2010 | 130,000 sq ft (12,000 m^{2}) | |
| Aashima Anupama Mall | Narmadapuram Road, Bhopal | 2012 | 110,000 sq ft (10,000 m^{2}) | |
| People's Mall | Ayodhya Bypass, Bhopal | 2014 | 100,000 sq ft (9,300 m^{2}) | |
| Dindayal City Mall, Gwalior | Phool Bagh, Lashkar, Gwalior | 2008 | 100,000 sq ft (9,300 m^{2}) | |
| South Avenue Mall | Narmada Road, Jabalpur | 2009 | 100,000 sq ft (9,300 m^{2}) | |

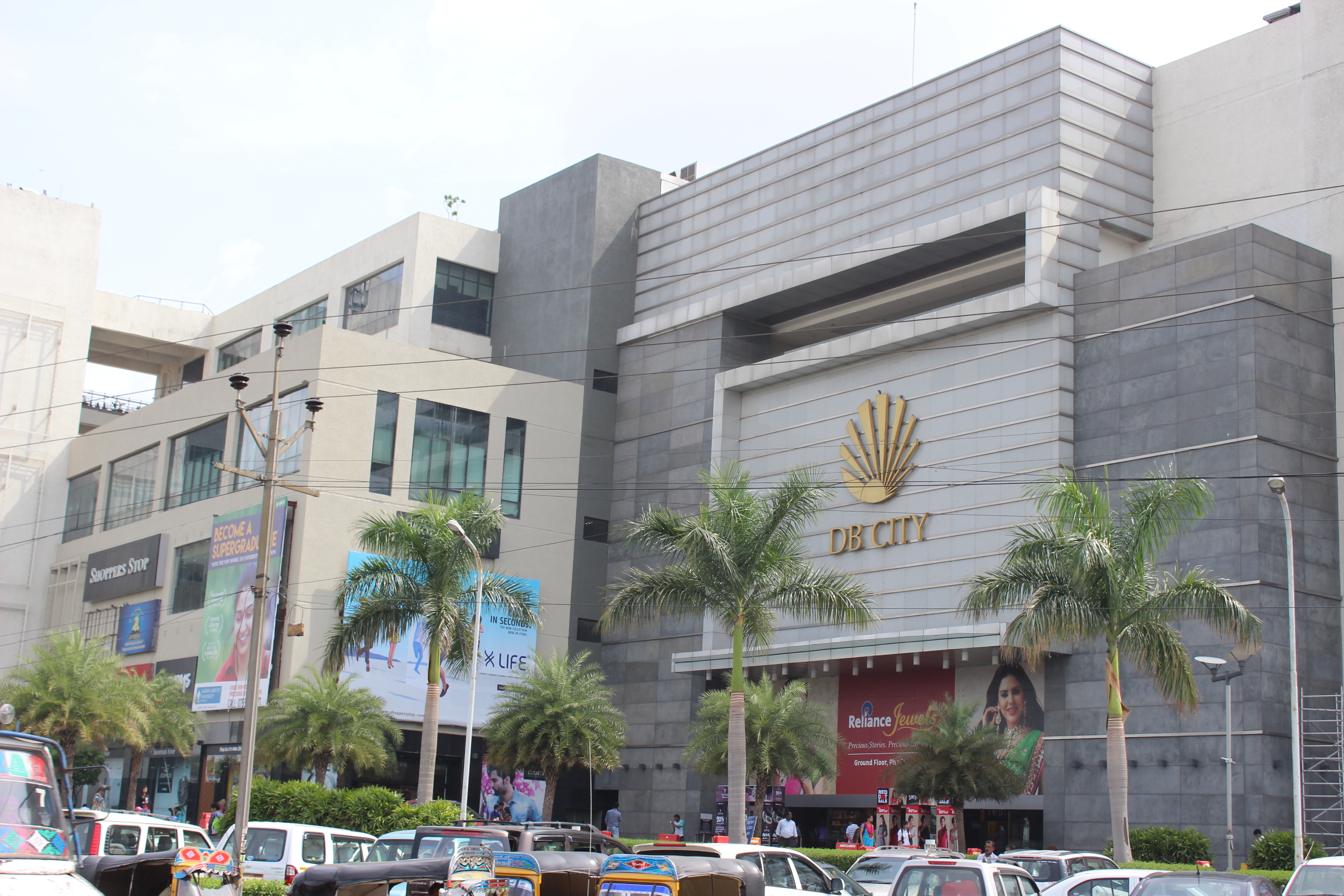
DB City Mall front entrance

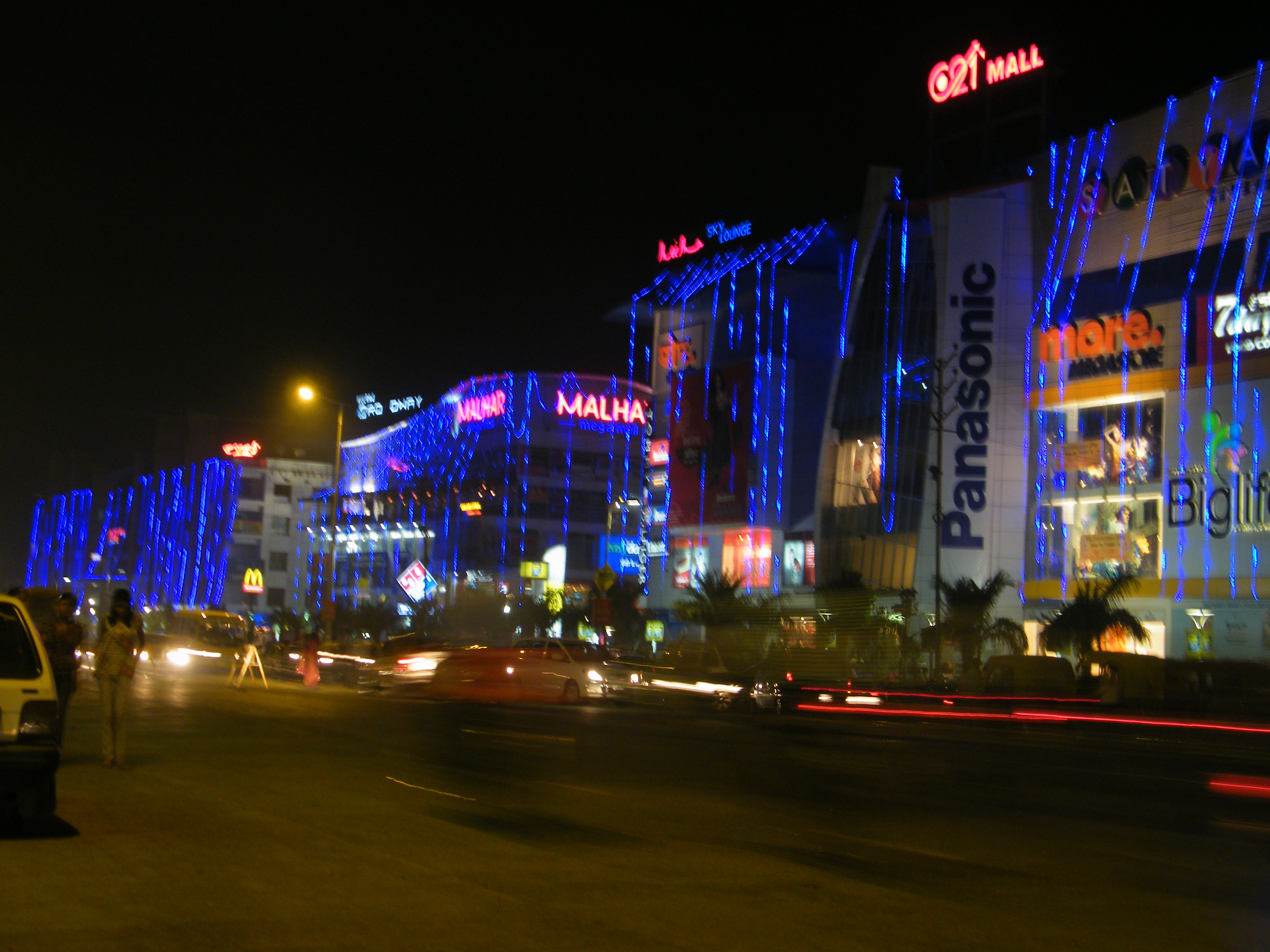
C21 Malhar Mall, Indore

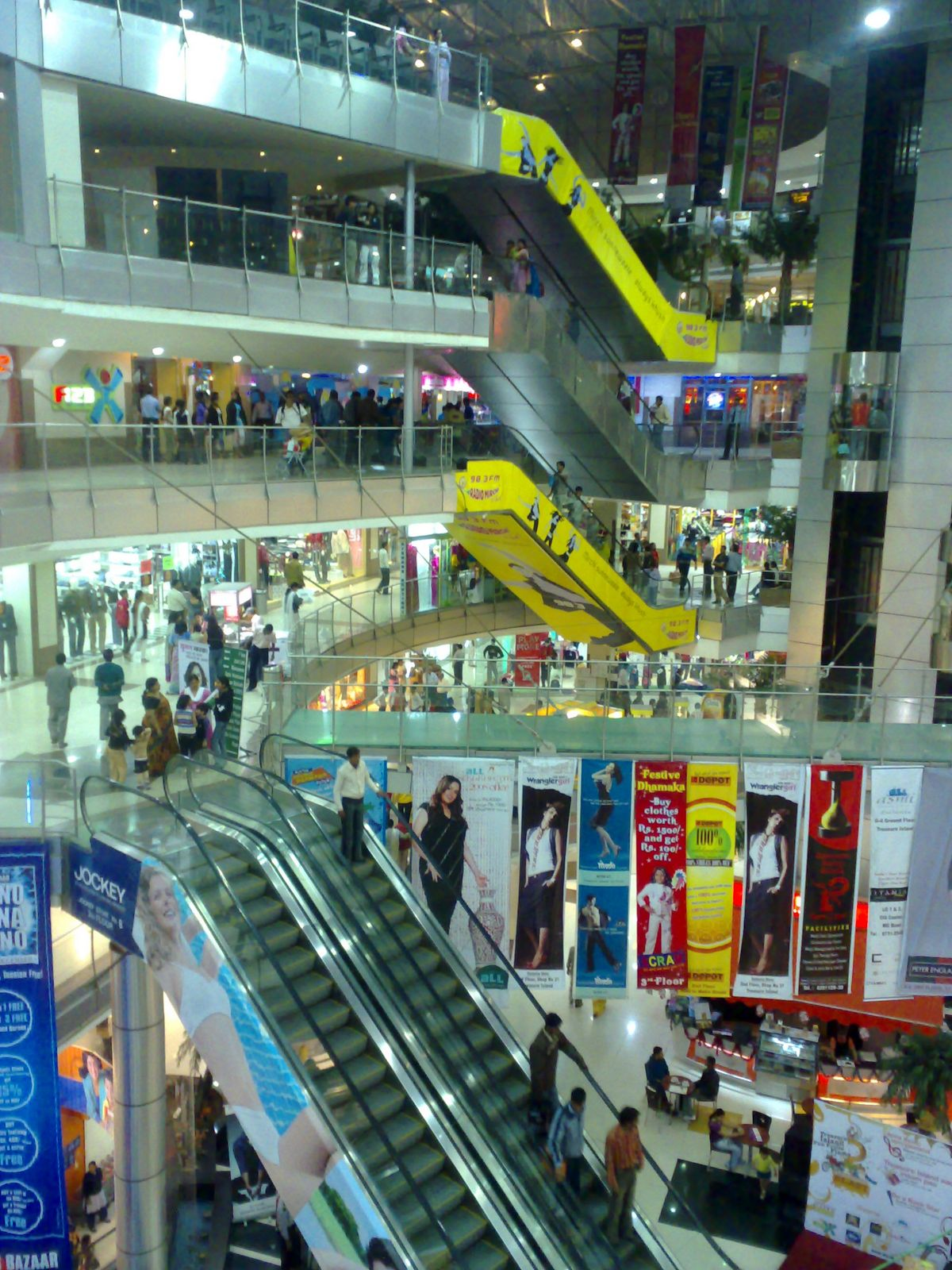
Nexus Treasure Island Mall, Indore

== Maharashtra ==
| Name | Location | Year | Size (gross leasable area) | Source |
|---|---|---|---|---|
| Sky City Mall | Borivali, Mumbai | 2025 | 1,207,000 sq ft (112,100 m^{2}) | |
| Amanora Mall | Hadapsar, Pune | 2008 | 1,200,000 sq ft (110,000 m^{2}) | |
| R City Mall | Ghatkopar, Mumbai | 2009 | 1,200,000 sq ft (110,000 m^{2}) | |
| Phoenix Mall of Millennium | Wakad, Pimpri-Chinchwad | 2023 | 1,200,000 sq ft (110,000 m^{2}) | |
| Phoenix Marketcity | Vimannagar, Pune | 2011 | 1,190,000 sq ft (111,000 m^{2}) | |
| Phoenix Marketcity | Kurla, Mumbai | 2011 | 1,140,000 sq ft (106,000 m^{2}) | |
| Phoenix Palladium | Lower Parel, Mumbai | 1996 | 1,100,000 sq ft (100,000 m^{2}) | |
| The Hub Mall | Western Expressway, Goregaon East, Mumbai | 2005 | 1,100,000 sq ft (100,000 m^{2}) | |
| Neptune Magnet Mall | Bhandup, Mumbai | 2011 | 1,056,000 sq ft (98,100 m^{2}) | |
| Lake Shore Thane | Thane | 2013 | 1,000,000 sq ft (93,000 m^{2}) | |
| Nexus Seawoods | Nerul, Navi Mumbai | 2017 | 971,742 sq ft (90,277.8 m^{2}) | |
| City Centre, Nashik | Untwadi, Nashik | 2009 | 900,000 sq ft (84,000 m^{2}) | |
| The Pavilion Mall | Shivajinagar, Pune | 2017 | 900,000 sq ft (84,000 m^{2}) | |
| Empress City Mall | Cotton Market, Nagpur | 2005 | 900,000 sq ft (84,000 m^{2}) | |
| Dynamix Mall | Juhu, Mumbai | 2005 | 900,000 sq ft (84,000 m^{2}) | |
| Infiniti Mall, Malad | Malad, Mumbai | 2011 | 850,000 sq ft (79,000 m^{2}) | |
| Elpro City Square | Chinchwad, Pimpri-Chinchwad | 2019 | 800,000 sq ft (74,000 m^{2}) | |
| Orion Mall, Panvel | Forest Colony, Panvel, Navi Mumbai | 2016 | 800,000 sq ft (74,000 m^{2}) | |
| Jio World Drive | Bandra Kurla Complex, Bandra East, Mumbai | 2021 | 762,300 sq ft (70,820 m^{2}) | |
| Jio World Plaza | Bandra Kurla Complex, Bandra East, Mumbai | 2023 | 750,000 sq ft (70,000 m^{2}) | |
| Growel's 101 | Kandivali, Mumbai | 2010 | 750,000 sq ft (70,000 m^{2}) | |
| Prozone Mall Aurangabad | Chikalthana, Aurangabad | 2010 | 600,000 sq ft (56,000 m^{2}) | |
| High Street Mall | Thane | 2010 | 580,000 sq ft (54,000 m^{2}) | |
| Lake City Mall | Thane | 2010 | 550,000 sq ft (51,000 m^{2}) | |
| Metro Junction Mall | Kalyan | 2008 | 550,000 sq ft (51,000 m^{2}) | |
| Inorbit Mall, Vashi | Vashi, Navi Mumbai | 2008 | 550,000 sq ft (51,000 m^{2}) | |
| Nexus Westend Mall | Aundh, Pune | 2016 | 550,000 sq ft (51,000 m^{2}) | |
| Inorbit Mall, Pune (permanently closed) | Wadgaon Sheri, Pune | 2011 | 547,000 sq ft (50,800 m^{2}) | |
| Inorbit Mall, Malad | Malad, Mumbai | 2004 | 500,000 sq ft (46,000 m^{2}) | |
| Oberoi Mall | Goregaon, Mumbai | 2008 | 500,000 sq ft (46,000 m^{2}) | |
| Lodha Xperia Mall | Dombivali | 2016 | 500,000 sq ft (46,000 m^{2}) | |
| CR2 Shopping Mall | Nariman Point, Mumbai | 2004 | 500,000 sq ft (46,000 m^{2}) | |
| Korum Mall | Thane | 2009 | 450,000 sq ft (42,000 m^{2}) | |
| Koregaon Park Plaza (Nitesh Hub Mall) - closed in November 2018 | Koregaon Park | 2012 | 446,000 sq ft (41,400 m^{2}) | |
| Khandesh Central Mall, Jalgaon | Jalgaon | 2010 | 445,000 sq ft (41,300 m^{2}) | |
| Raghuleela Mega Mall | Kandivali, Mumbai | 2009 | 400,000 sq ft (37,000 m^{2}) | |
| VR Nagpur | Medical College Square, Untkhana, Nagpur | 2019 | 380,000 sq ft (35,000 m^{2}) | |
| Raghuleela Mall, Vashi | Vashi, Navi Mumbai | 2007 | 375,000 sq ft (34,800 m^{2}) | |
| Royale Heritage Mall | NIBM Road, Pune | 2015 | 350,000 sq ft (33,000 m^{2}) | |
| Pinnacle Mall | Nashik | 2011 | 300,000 sq ft (28,000 m^{2}) | |
| Abhiruchi Mall & Multiplex | Veer Bajai Pasalkar Chowk, Vadgaon Budruk, Pune | 2013 | 300,000 sq ft (28,000 m^{2}) | |
| K Star Mall | Chembur, Mumbai | 2009 | 300,000 sq ft (28,000 m^{2}) | |
| Atria The Millennium Mall | Worli, Mumbai | 2006 | 300,000 sq ft (28,000 m^{2}) | |
| Star Mall | Dadar West, Mumbai | 2014 | 300,000 sq ft (28,000 m^{2}) | |
| Oberoi Sky City Mall | Borivali, Mumbai | 2025 | 300,000 sq ft (28,000 m^{2}) | |
| Grand High Street Mall | Hinjewadi, Pimpri-Chinchwad | 2015 | 300,000 sq ft (28,000 m^{2}) | |
| Citi Mall | Andheri West, Mumbai | 2009 | 250,000 sq ft (23,000 m^{2}) | |
| The Capital Mall | Nallasopara | 2021 | 250,000 sq ft (23,000 m^{2}) | |
| Maxus Mall | 90 Feet Rd, Saki Naka, Mumbai | 2008 | 250,000 sq ft (23,000 m^{2}) | |
| Mariplex Metro Square | Kalyani Nagar, Pune | 2012 | 250,000 sq ft (23,000 m^{2}) | |
| SPOT18 | Pimpri-Chinchwad | 2015 | 250,000 sq ft (23,000 m^{2}) | |
| Vision One Mall | Wakad, Pimpri-Chinchwad | 2014 | 250,000 sq ft (23,000 m^{2}) | |
| Elpro City Square Mall | MG Road, Pimpri-Chinchwad | 2014 | 250,000 sq ft (23,000 m^{2}) | |
| R-Mall | Mulund, Mumbai | 2003 | 250,000 sq ft (23,000 m^{2}) | |
| Infiniti Mall, Andheri | Andheri, Mumbai | 2004 | 250,000 sq ft (23,000 m^{2}) | |
| Globus Mall | Bandra West, Mumbai | 2002 | 250,000 sq ft (23,000 m^{2}) | |
| Link Square Mall | Bandra West, Mumbai | 2010 | 250,000 sq ft (23,000 m^{2}) | |
| R Mall | Thane | 2003 | 250,000 sq ft (23,000 m^{2}) | |
| Wonder Mall | Thane | 2003 | 210,000 sq ft (20,000 m^{2}) | |
| Aurum Square Mall | Ghansoli, Navi Mumbai | 2024 | 200,000 sq ft (19,000 m^{2}) | |
| Kumar Pacific Mall | Shankar Sheth Road, Swargate, Pune | 2011 | 200,000 sq ft (19,000 m^{2}) | |
| Tapadia City Centre Mall | Badnera Road, Amravati | 2023 | 200,000 sq ft (19,000 m^{2}) | |
| Premier Plaza Mall | Chinchwad, Pimpri-Chinchwad | 2016 | 200,000 sq ft (19,000 m^{2}) | |
| Little World Mall | Kharghar, Navi Mumbai | 2008 | 200,000 sq ft (19,000 m^{2}) | |
| Reliance Centro | VIP Road, Ramdaspeth, Nagpur | 2012 | 200,000 sq ft (19,000 m^{2}) | |
| Eternity Mall | Variety Chowk, Sitabuldi, Nagpur | 2007 | 200,000 sq ft (19,000 m^{2}) | |
| Fortune Mall | Rani Jhansi Square Bardi, Sitabuldi, Nagpur | 2006 | 200,000 sq ft (19,000 m^{2}) | |
| R Odeon Mall | Ghatkopar East, Mumbai | 2009 | 200,000 sq ft (19,000 m^{2}) | |
| Fun Republic Mall | Andheri West, Mumbai | 2010 | 200,000 sq ft (19,000 m^{2}) | |
| Cubic Mall | Chembur, Mumbai | 2016 | 200,000 sq ft (19,000 m^{2}) | |
| Eternity Mall | Thane | 2006 | 189,000 sq ft (17,600 m^{2}) | |
| Xion Mall | Hinjewadi, Pimpri-Chinchwad | 2015 | 150,000 sq ft (14,000 m^{2}) | |
| Nakshatra Mall | Dadar, Mumbai | 2010 | 150,000 sq ft (14,000 m^{2}) | |
| City One Mall (formerly Pimpri Central) | Chinchwad, Pimpri-Chinchwad | 2010 | 150,000 sq ft (14,000 m^{2}) | |
| Crossroads Mall (permanently closed) | Worli, Mumbai | 1999 | 150,000 sq ft (14,000 m^{2}) | |

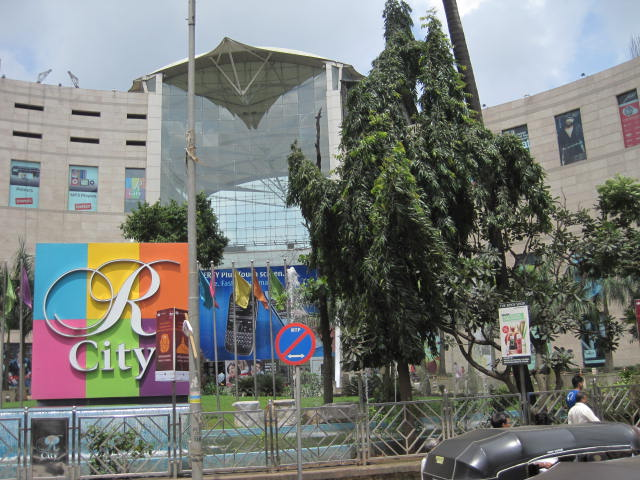
R City Mall, Mumbai

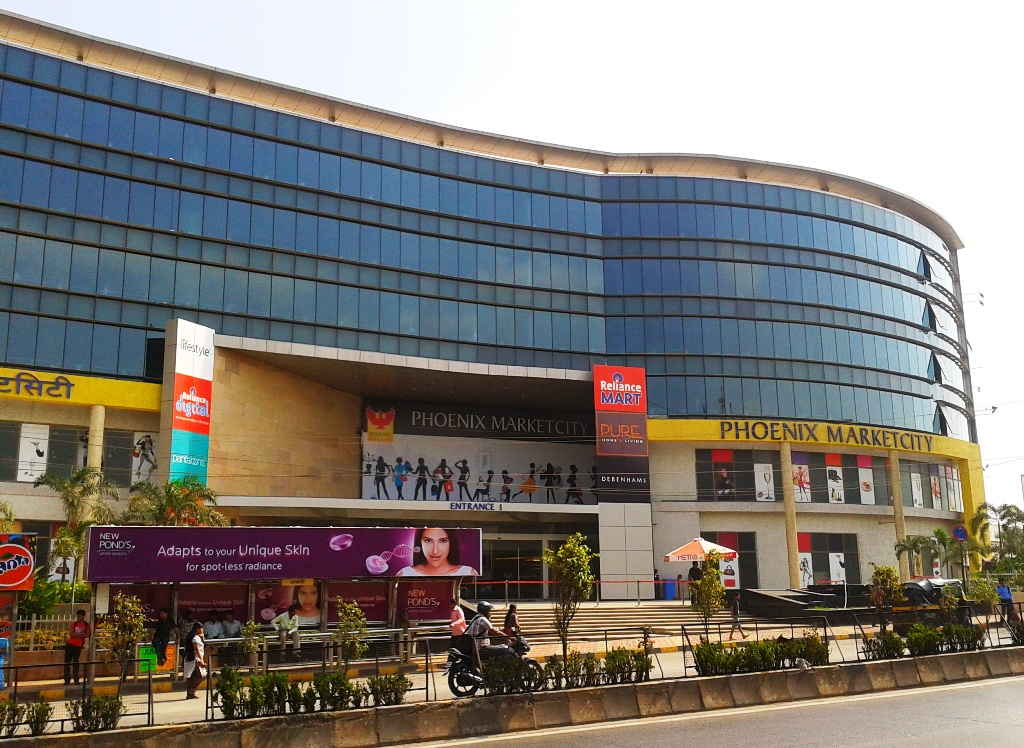
Phoenix Marketcity (Mumbai), one of the largest malls in India

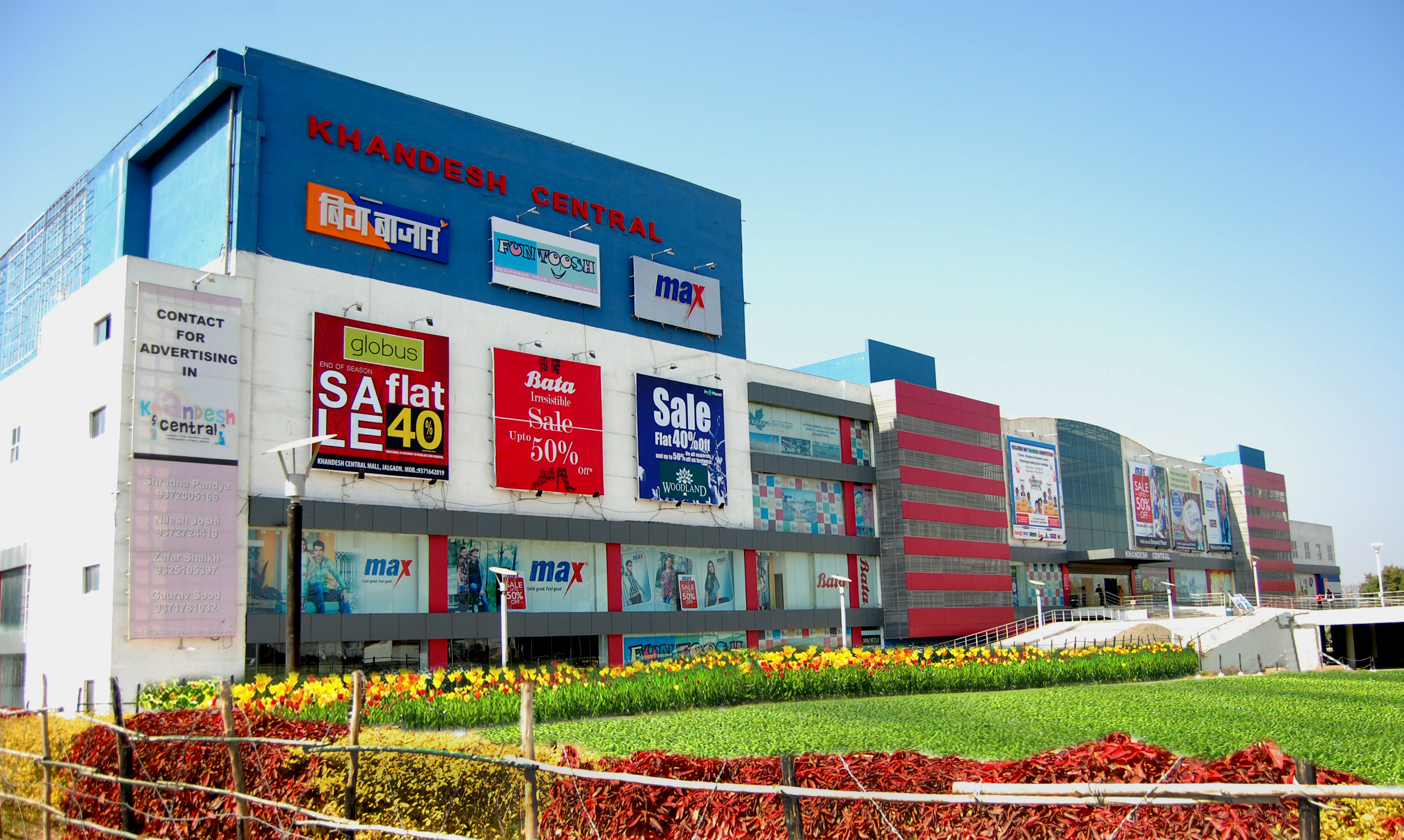
Khandesh Central Mall, Jalgaon

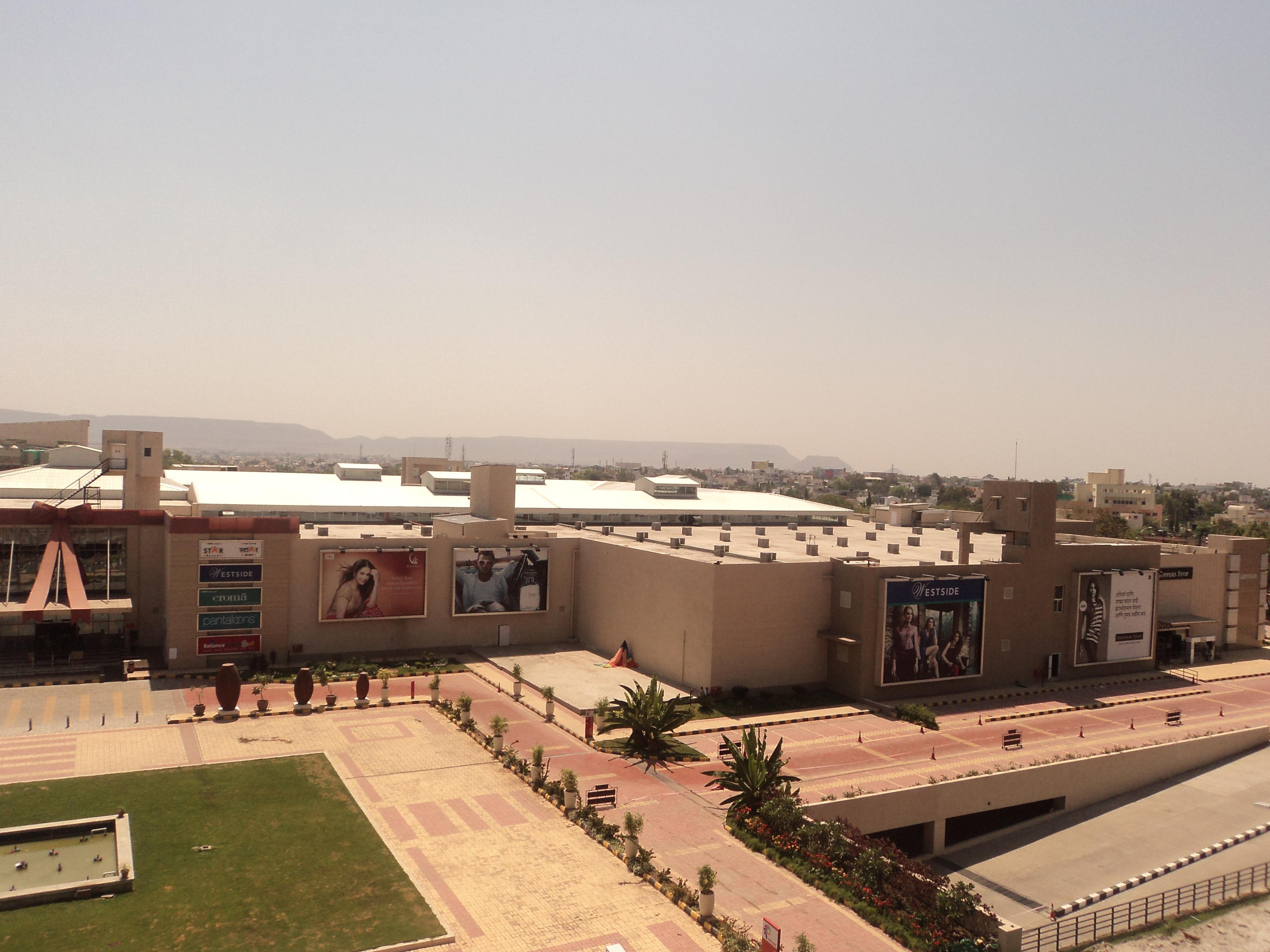
Prozone Mall Aurangabad

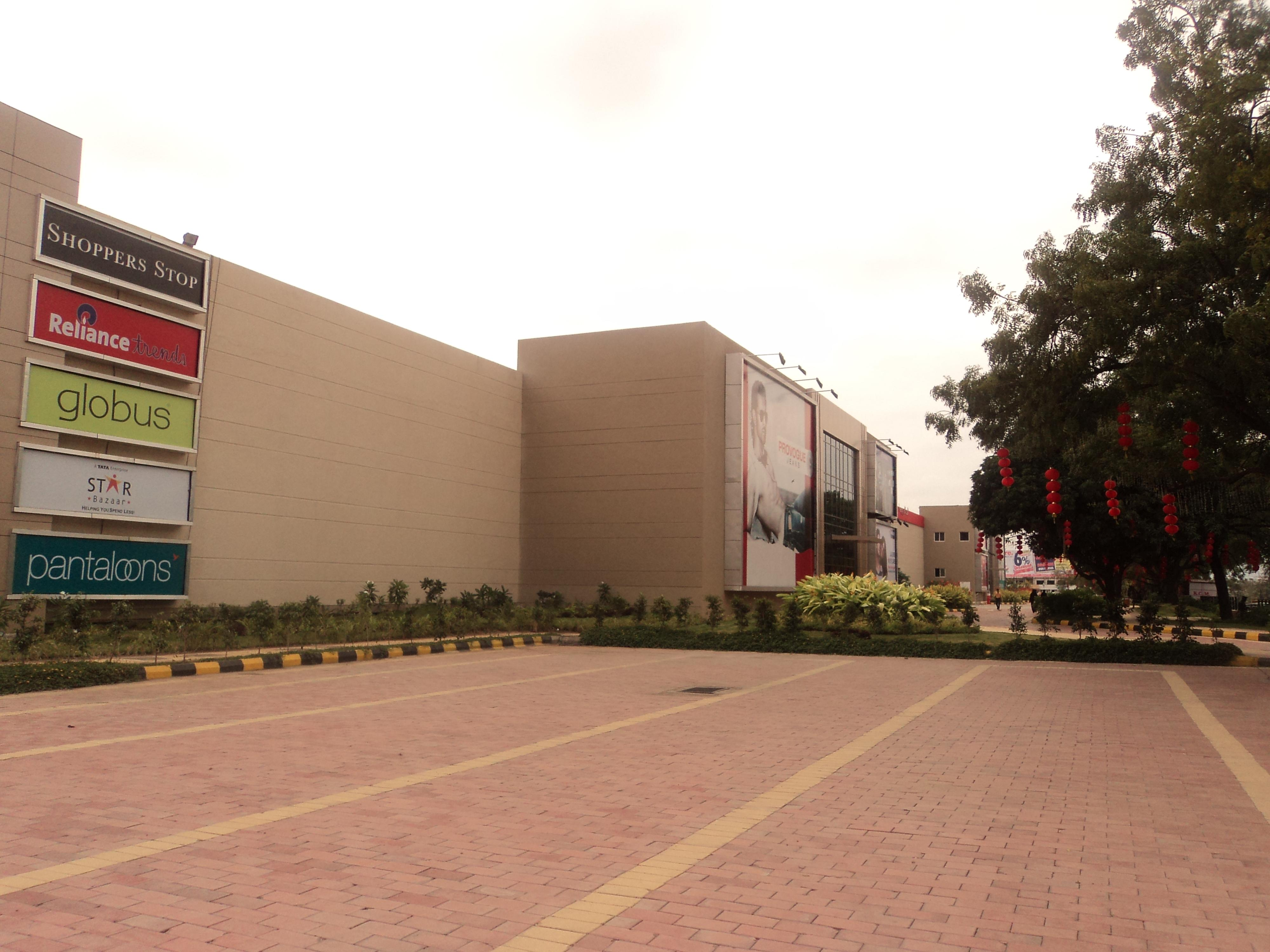
Prozone Mall Aurangabad

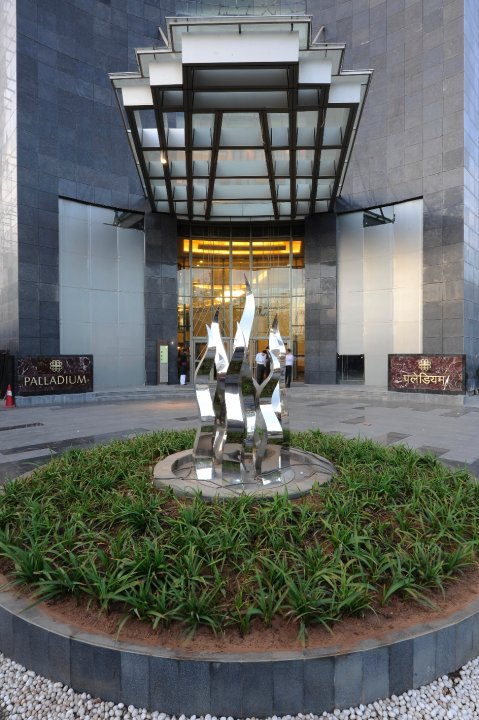
Palladium Mall, Mumbai

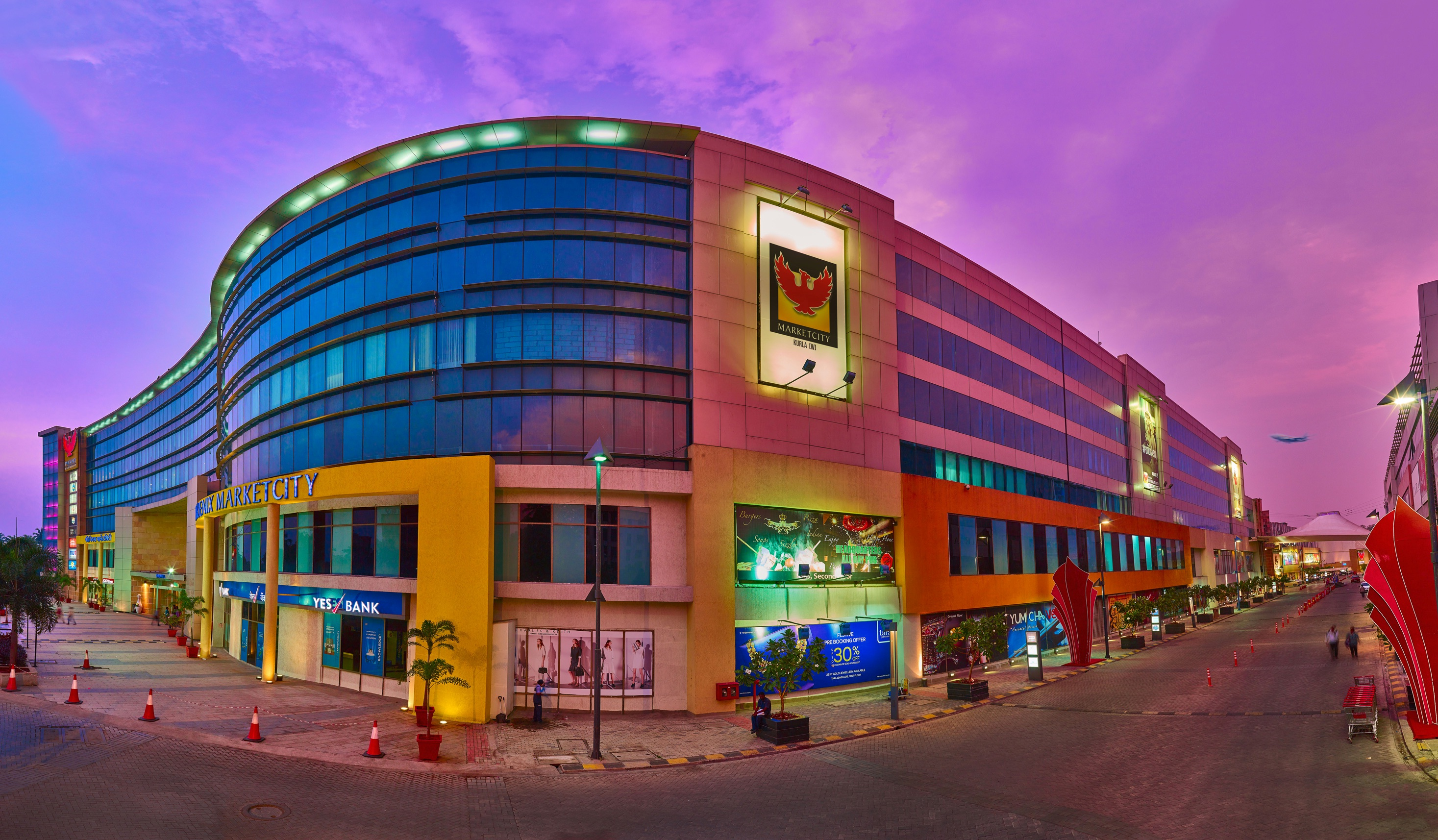
Phoenix Marketcity (Mumbai) night view

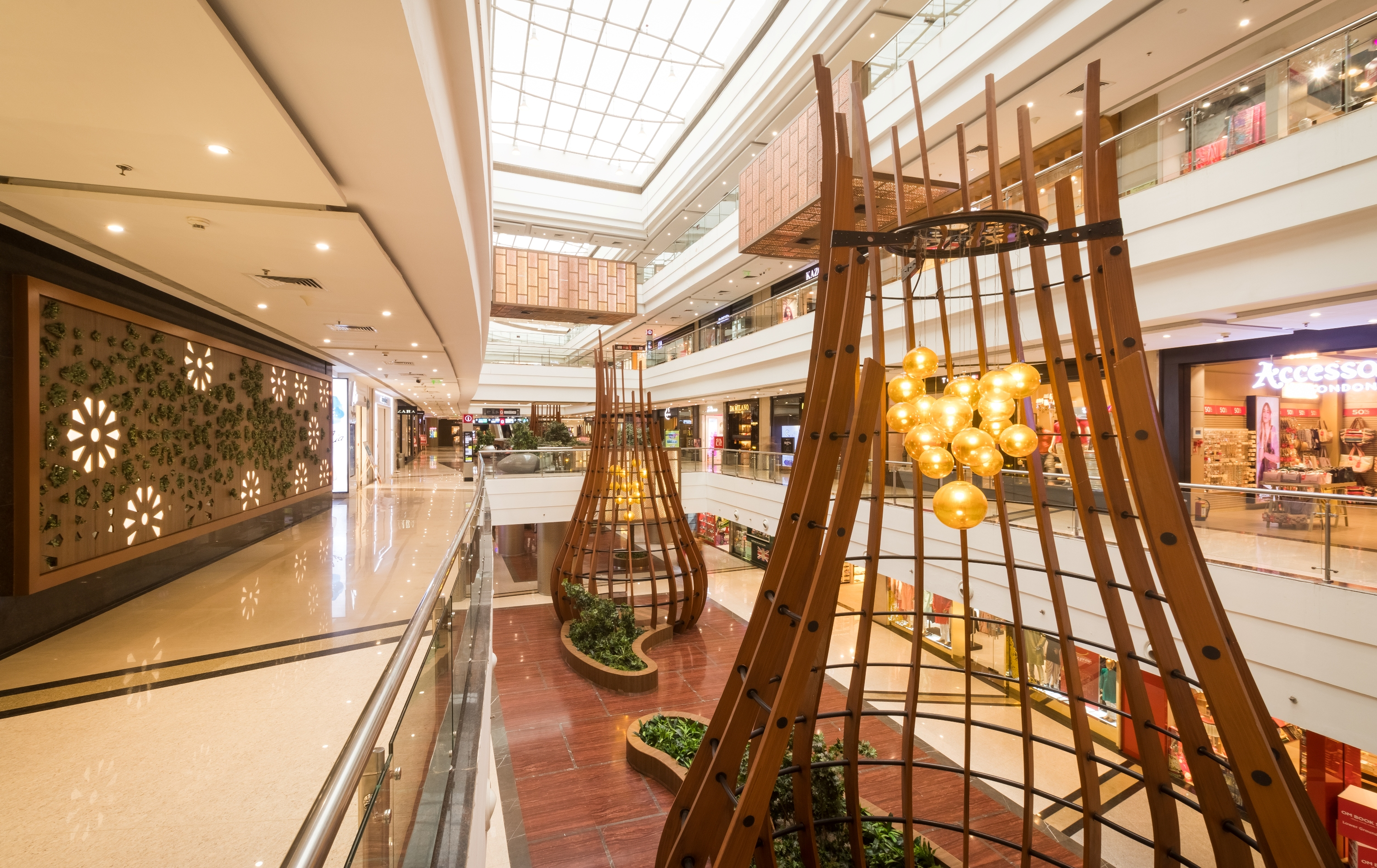
Phoenix Marketcity (Mumbai)

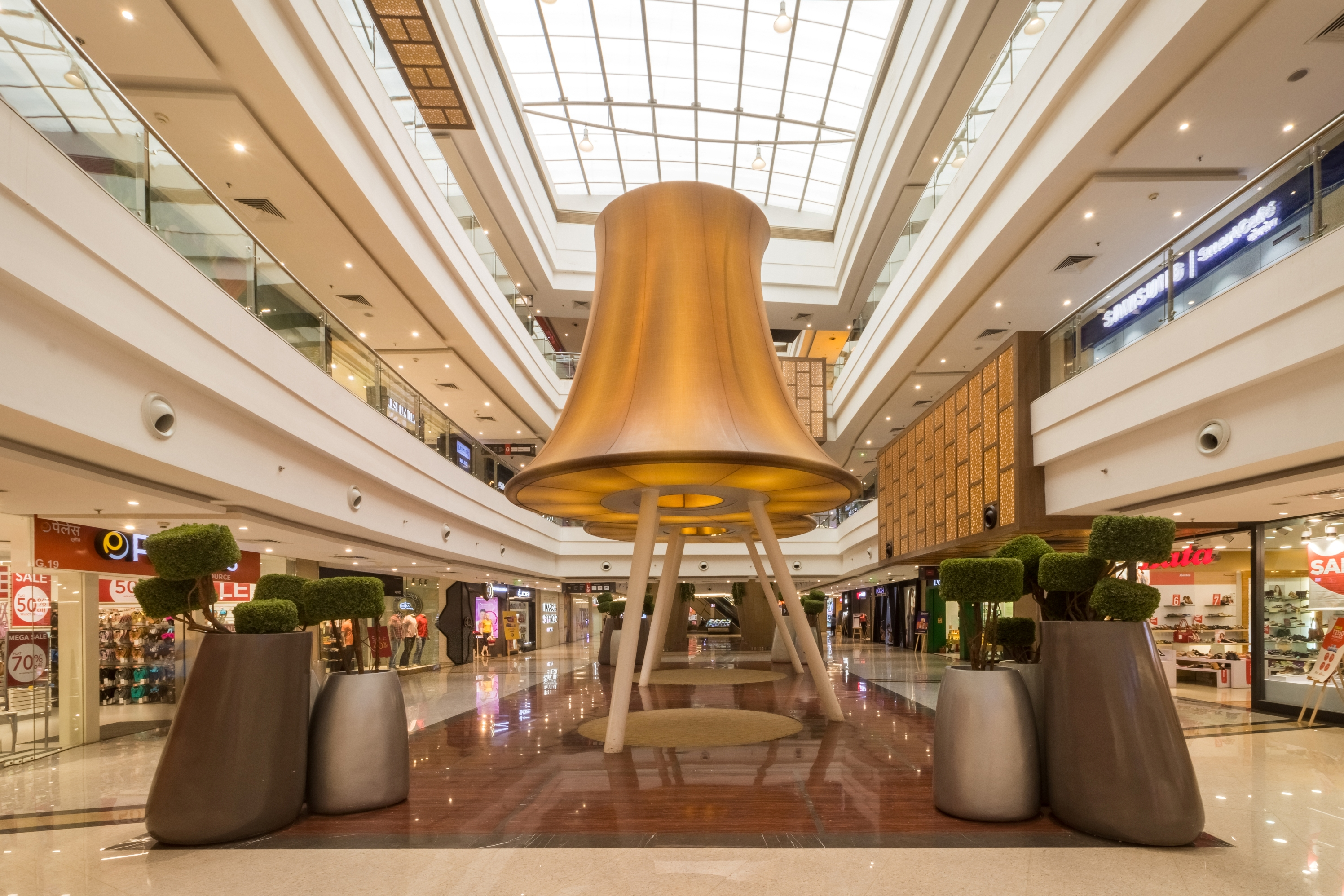
Phoenix Marketcity (Mumbai)

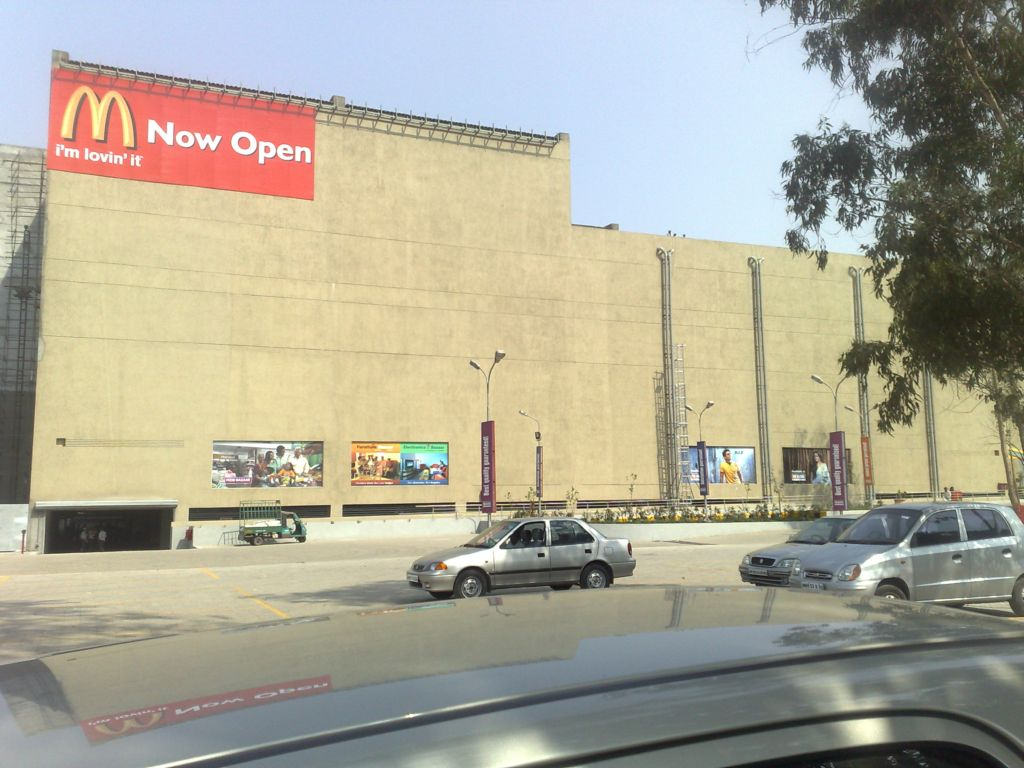
Metro Junction Mall, Kalyan East, as seen from across the street

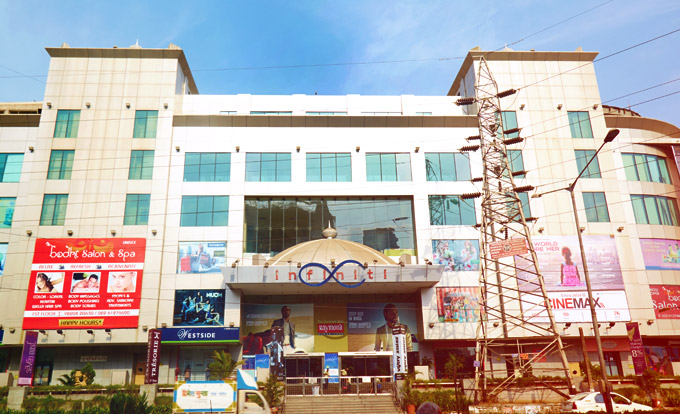
Infiniti Mall, Andheri, Mumbai

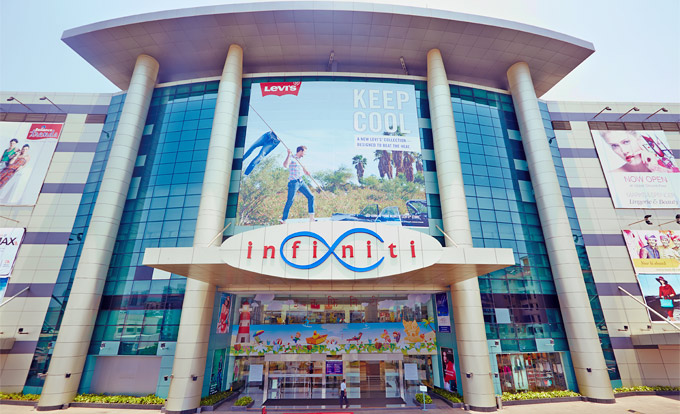
Infiniti Mall, Malad, Mumbai

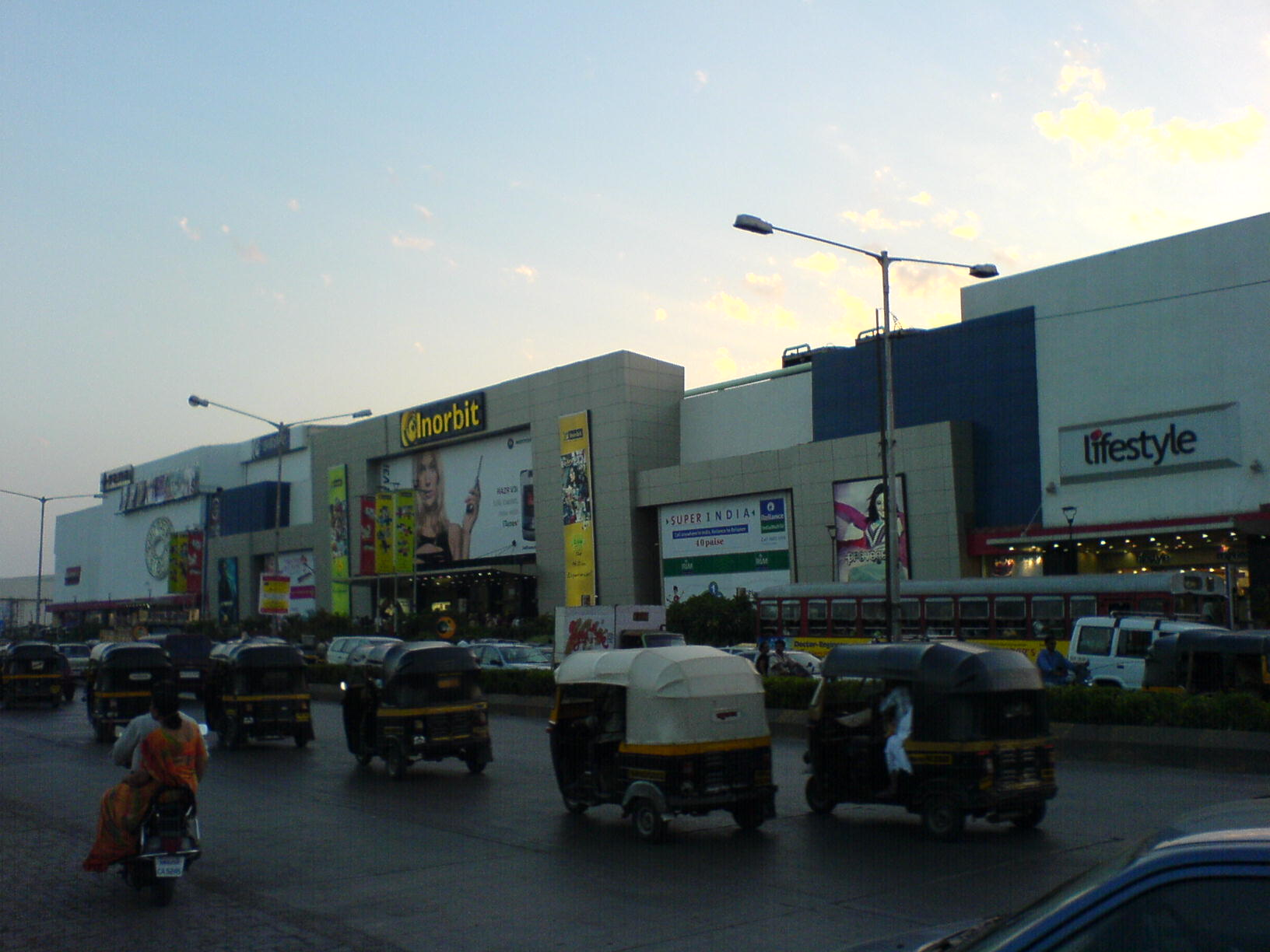
Inorbit Mall, Malad, Mumbai

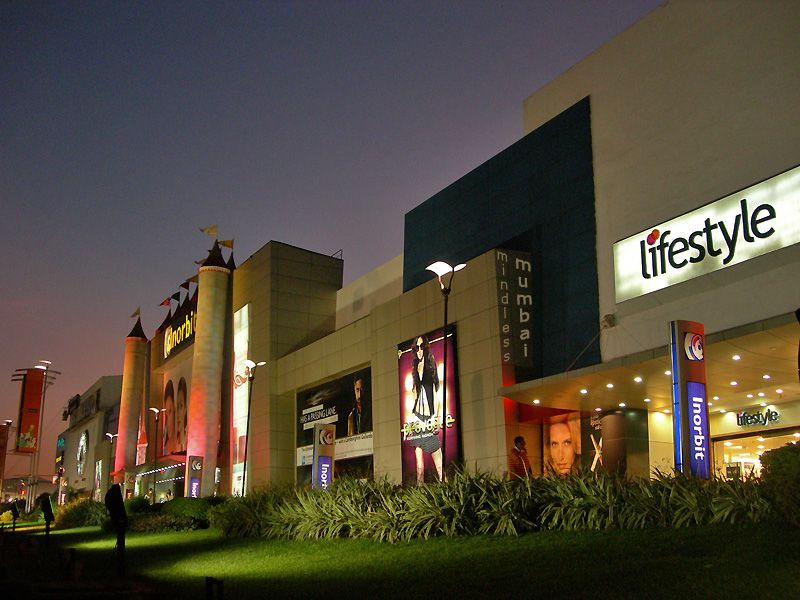
Inorbit Mall, Malad, Mumbai night view

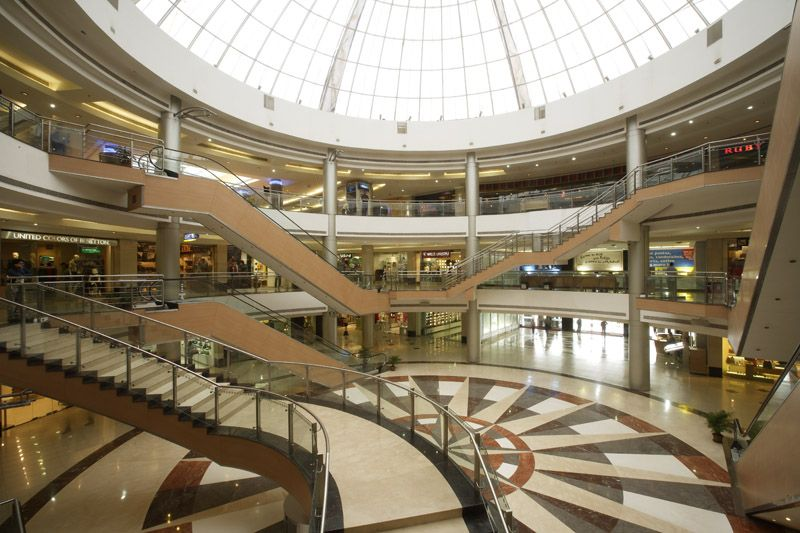
Inorbit Mall, Malad, Mumbai inside view

Raghuleela Mall, Navi Mumbai

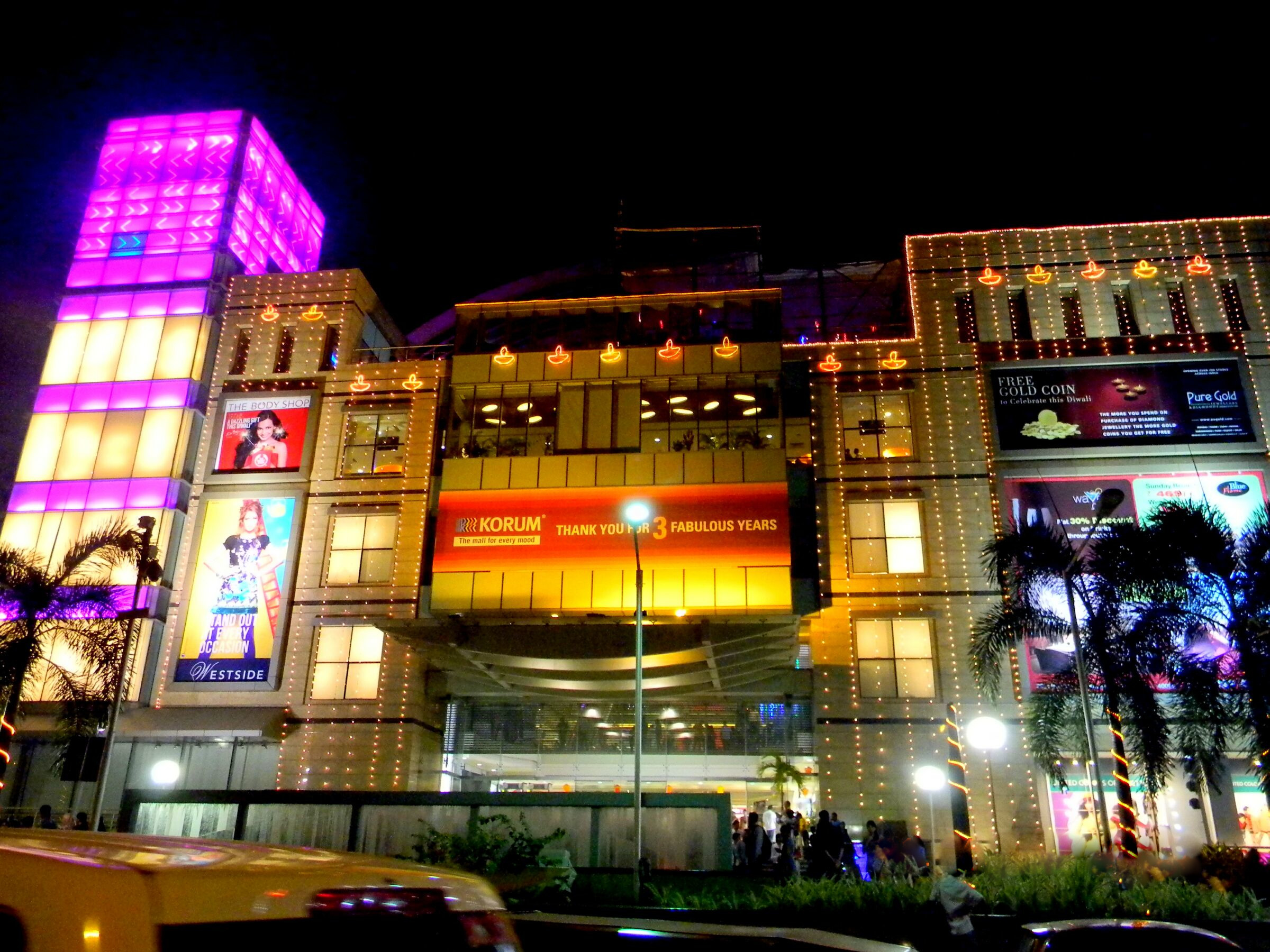
Korum Mall, outside view

Korum Mall, inside view

== Odisha ==
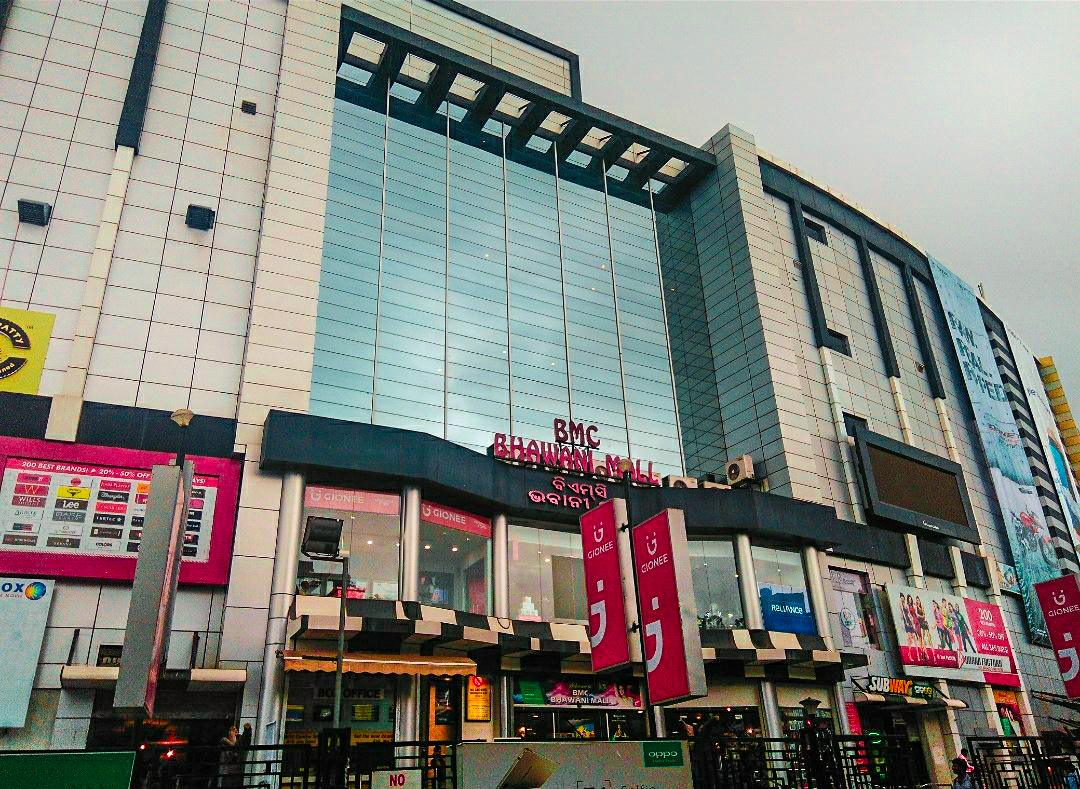
Bhawani Mall, Bhubaneswar is one of the largest malls in Bhubaneswar

| Name | Location | Year | Size (gross leasable area) | Source |
|---|---|---|---|---|
| Nexus Esplanade | Rasulgarh, Bhubaneswar | 2018 | 950,000 sq ft (88,000 m^{2}) | |
| Bhawani Mall | Saheed Nagar, Bhubaneswar | 2012 | 600,000 sq ft (56,000 m^{2}) | |
| Bhubaneswar 1 | Bhubaneswar | 2018 | 350,000 sq ft (33,000 m^{2}) | |
| DN Regalia | Bhubaneswar | 2018 | 350,000 sq ft (33,000 m^{2}) | |
| Forum Galleria Mall | Rourkela | 2020 | 350,000 sq ft (33,000 m^{2}) | |
| Plutone Mall | Rourkela | 2023 | 349,173 sq ft (32,439.2 m^{2}) | |
| Utkal Kanika Galleria | Gautam Nagar, Bhubaneswar | 2020 | 250,000 sq ft (23,000 m^{2}) | |
| SGBL Mega Mart | CDA Area, Cuttack | 2022 | 217,800 sq ft (20,230 m^{2}) | |
| Forum Mart | Janpath, Bhubaneswar | 2004 | 200,000 sq ft (19,000 m^{2}) | |
| Pal Heights | Jayadev Vihar, Bhubaneswar | 2008 | 200,000 sq ft (19,000 m^{2}) | |
| Netaji Subash Chandra Bose Arcade | Dargah Bazaar, Cuttack | 2007 | 170,000 sq ft (16,000 m^{2}) | |
| Royal Arcade | Bhubaneswar | 2017 | 158,000 sq ft (14,700 m^{2}) | |
| Spectrum Jyoti Mall | Brahmapur | 2026 | 150,000 sq ft (14,000 m^{2}) | |
| Utkal Centre Point | Chorda Bypass Square, Byasanagar (Jajpur Road) | 2019 | 120,000 sq ft (11,000 m^{2}) | |
| City Centre Mall, Sambalpur | Sambalpur | 2012 | 100,000 sq ft (9,300 m^{2}) | |
| SGBL Square Mall | Rajabagicha, Cuttack | 2018 | 100,000 sq ft (9,300 m^{2}) | |
| Fe2 Arcade Mall | Rourkela | 2023 | 70,781.19 sq ft (6,575.788 m^{2}) | |
| BMC Keshari Mall | Ashok Nagar, Bhubaneswar | 2010 | 70,000 sq ft (6,500 m^{2}) | |
| Symphony Mall | Rudrapur, Bhubaneswar | 2019 | 48,000 sq ft (4,500 m^{2}) | |

== Punjab ==
| Name | Location | Year | Size (gross leasable area) | Source |
|---|---|---|---|---|
| VR Punjab (formerly North Country Mall) | Sector-118, Mohali | 2012 | 1,000,000 sq ft (93,000 m^{2}) | |
| VR Ambarsar (formerly Trilium Mall) | Circular Road, Amritsar | 2013 | 1,000,000 sq ft (93,000 m^{2}) | |
| CP67 Mall | Sector-67, Mohali | 2023 | 900,000 sq ft (84,000 m^{2}) | |
| Pavilion Mall Ludhiana | Civil Lines, Ludhiana | 2015 | 900,000 sq ft (84,000 m^{2}) | |
| MBD Neopolis Mall, Jalandhar | Sehdev Market, Jalandhar | 2012 | 850,000 sq ft (79,000 m^{2}) | |
| Nexus Amritsar (formerly Mall of Amritsar and Alpha One Mall, Amritsar) | Grand Trunk Road, Amritsar | 2010 | 535,241 sq ft (49,725.5 m^{2}) | |
| Cosmo Plaza Mall | Zirakpur | 2018 | 420,000 sq ft (39,000 m^{2}) | |
| Paras Downtown Square | Zirakpur | 2007 | 350,000 sq ft (33,000 m^{2}) | |
| Bestech Square | Sector-66, Mohali | 2018 | 350,000 sq ft (33,000 m^{2}) | |
| Reliance Mall | Choti Baradari, Jalandhar | 2015 | 350,000 sq ft (33,000 m^{2}) | |
| Flamez High Street | Urban Estate, Jalandhar | 2018 | 350,000 sq ft (33,000 m^{2}) | |
| Nexus MBD Neopolis Mall, Ludhiana | Ferozpur Road, BRS Nagar, Ludhiana | 2017 | 330,000 sq ft (31,000 m^{2}) | |
| Avon City Mall | Sat Paul Mitthal Rd, Gurdev Nagar, Ludhiana | 2022 | 320,000 sq ft (30,000 m^{2}) | |
| Celebration Mall Amritsar | Batala Road, Amritsar | 2011 | 319,000 sq ft (29,600 m^{2}) | |
| Celebration Mall Gobindgarh | Gobindgarh Khanna | 2017 | 300,000 sq ft (28,000 m^{2}) | |
| Grand Walk Mall | Ferozpur Road, BRS Nagar, Ludhiana | 2016 | 280,000 sq ft (26,000 m^{2}) | |
| Silver Arc Mall | Ferozpur Road, Gurdev Nagar, Ludhiana | 2012 | 250,000 sq ft (23,000 m^{2}) | |
| Ansal Plaza, Ludhiana | Ferozpur Road, Gurdev Nagar, Ludhiana | 2005 | 250,000 sq ft (23,000 m^{2}) | |
| HBN Peninsula Mall | Adarsh Nagar, Bhatinda | 2016 | 250,000 sq ft (23,000 m^{2}) | |
| Wave Mall, Ludhiana | Ferozpur Road, BRS Nagar, Ludhiana | 2007 | 250,000 sq ft (23,000 m^{2}) | |
| Omaxe Mall | Mall Road, Patiala | 2016 | 230,000 sq ft (21,000 m^{2}) | |
| Soul Space Spirit Mall | Grand Trunk Road, Amritsar | 2018 | 200,000 sq ft (19,000 m^{2}) | |
| Omaxe Plaza | Civil Lines, Ludhiana | 2011 | 170,000 sq ft (16,000 m^{2}) | |
| Omaxe Novelty Mall | Lawrence Road, Amritsar | 2019 | 123,000 sq ft (11,400 m^{2}) | |
| City Centre Mall | Civil Lines, Bhatinda | 2009 | 100,000 sq ft (9,300 m^{2}) | |

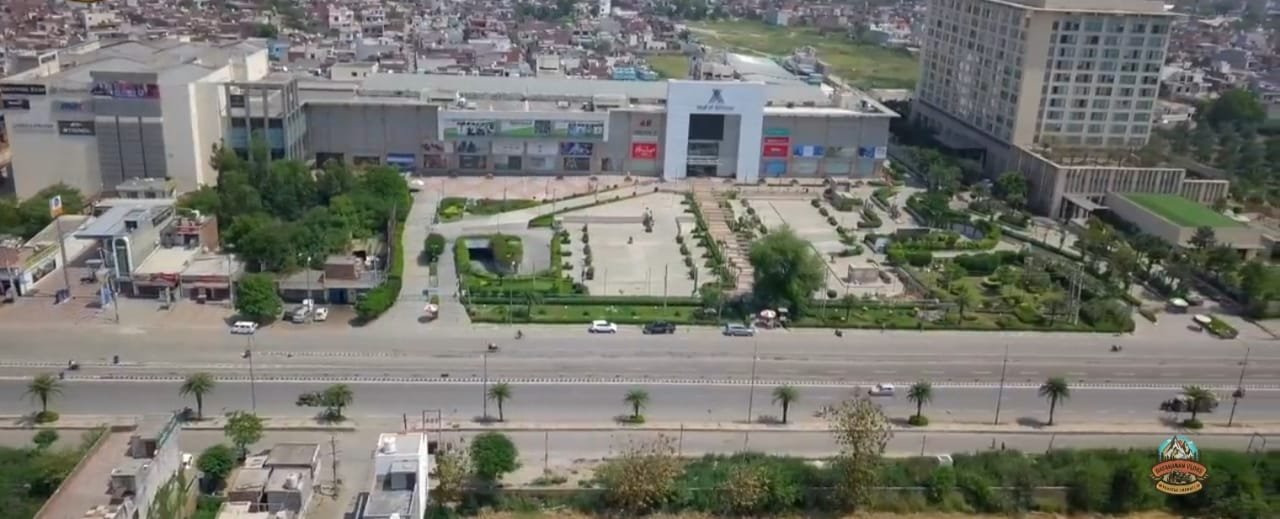
Aerial View of Mall of Amritsar

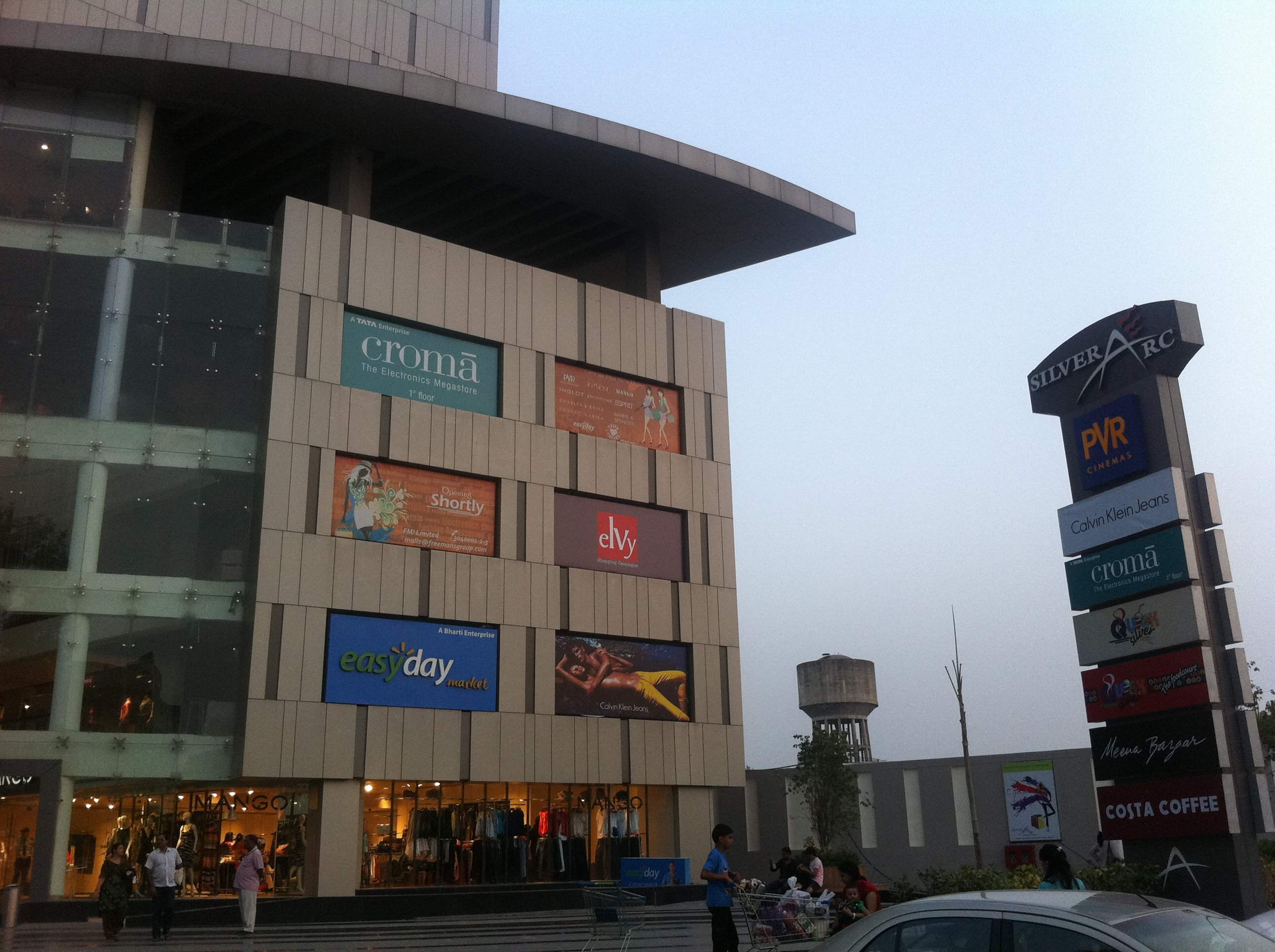
Silver Arc Mall, Ludhiana

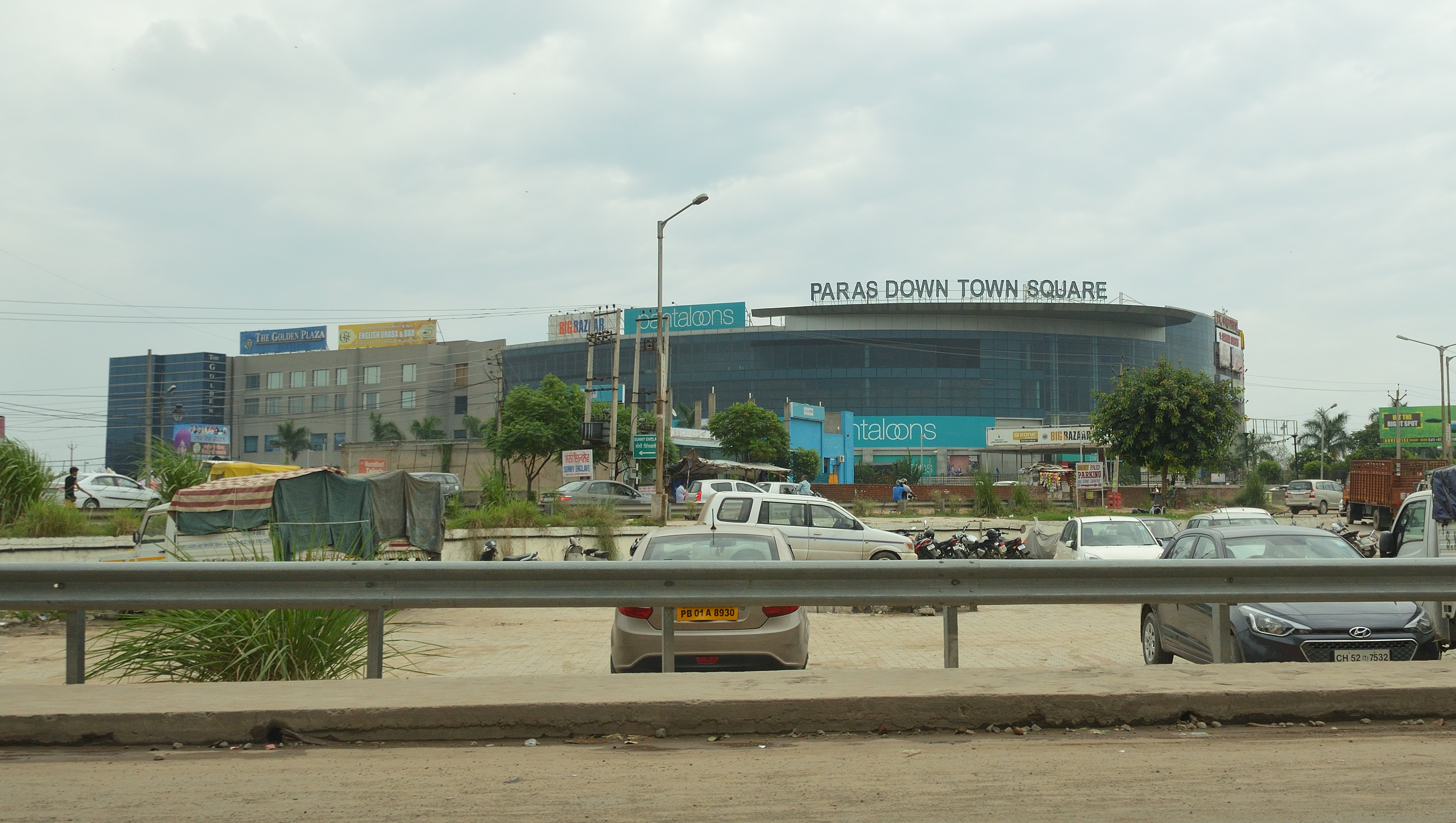
Paras Downtown Square at Mohali

== Rajasthan ==
| Name | Location | Year | Size (gross leasable area) | Source |
|---|---|---|---|---|
| Urban Square Mall, Udaipur | RIICO Industrial Area, Sukher, Udaipur | 2019 | 1,800,000 sq ft (170,000 m^{2}) | |
| World Trade Park, Jaipur | Jawahar Lal Nehru Marg, Malviya Nagar, Jaipur | 2012 | 1,300,000 sq ft (120,000 m^{2}) | |
| Indiabulls Mega Mall, Jodhpur | Jodhpur-Pali Highway, Meera Nagar, Jodhpur | 2018 | 650,000 sq ft (60,000 m^{2}) | |
| Lake City Mall | University Road, Ashok Nagar, Udaipur | 2013 | 500,000 sq ft (46,000 m^{2}) | |
| Nexus Celebration Mall | Bhawana, Udaipur | 2011 | 400,000 sq ft (37,000 m^{2}) | |
| Triton Mega Mall | Jhotwara Road, Chomu Pulia Cir, Jaipur | 2012 | 350,000 sq ft (33,000 m^{2}) | |
| RKay Mall | Panchwati, Udaipur | 2023 | 300,000 sq ft (28,000 m^{2}) | |
| City Mall, Kota | Indraprastha Ind. Area, Jhalawar Road, Kota | 2009 | 300,000 sq ft (28,000 m^{2}) | |
| Apex Mall, Lal Kothi | Lal Kothi, Jaipur | 1997 | 200,000 sq ft (19,000 m^{2}) | |
| City Square Mall | Tonk Road, Kirti Nagar, Jaipur | 2011 | 200,000 sq ft (19,000 m^{2}) | |
| Mahima Trinity Mall | Govindpuri, Jaipur | 2010 | 200,000 sq ft (19,000 m^{2}) | |
| MGF Metropolitan Mall | Sahakar Bhawan Cir, Ashok Nagar, Jaipur | 2007 | 190,000 sq ft (18,000 m^{2}) | |
| Pink Square Mall | Govind Marg, Adarsh Nagar, Jaipur | 2010 | 150,000 sq ft (14,000 m^{2}) | |
| Ansal Royal Plaza | Nai Sarak Chauraha, High Court Road, Jodhpur | 2007 | 136,000 sq ft (12,600 m^{2}) | |
| Sunny Trade Center | Shanti Nagar, Jaipur | 2012 | 120,000 sq ft (11,000 m^{2}) | |
| Elements Mall | Ajmer Road, Jaipur | 2009 | 100,000 sq ft (9,300 m^{2}) | |
| Mall of Jaipur | Gandhi Path West, Vaishali Nagar, Jaipur | 2017 | 100,000 sq ft (9,300 m^{2}) | |

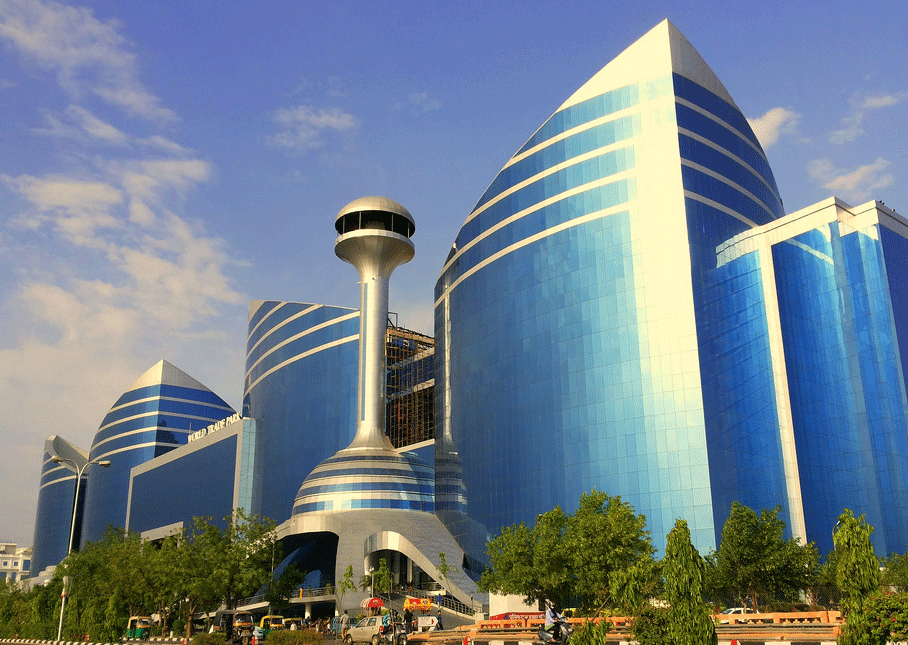
World Trade Park Mall

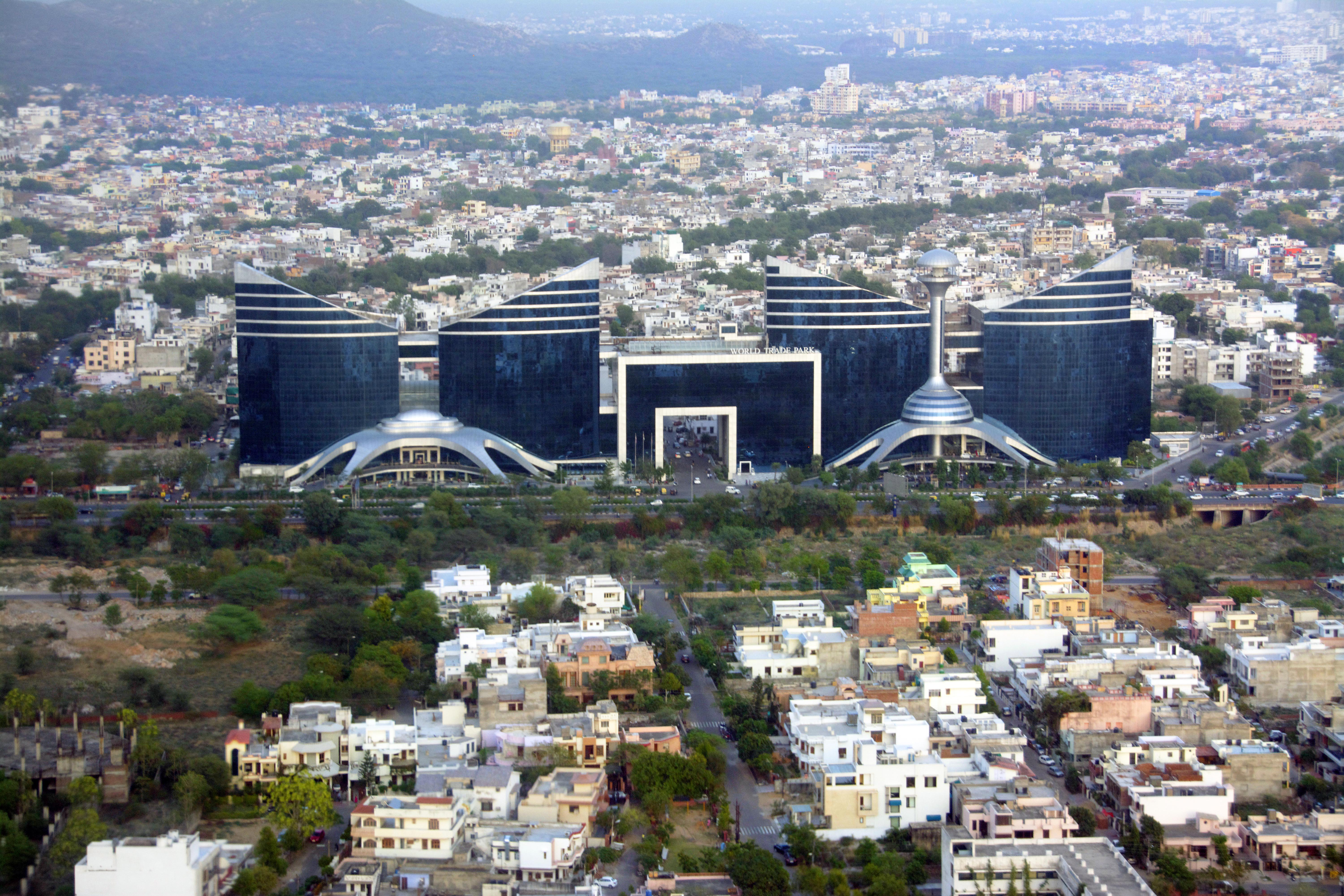
World Trade Park Mall Aerial View

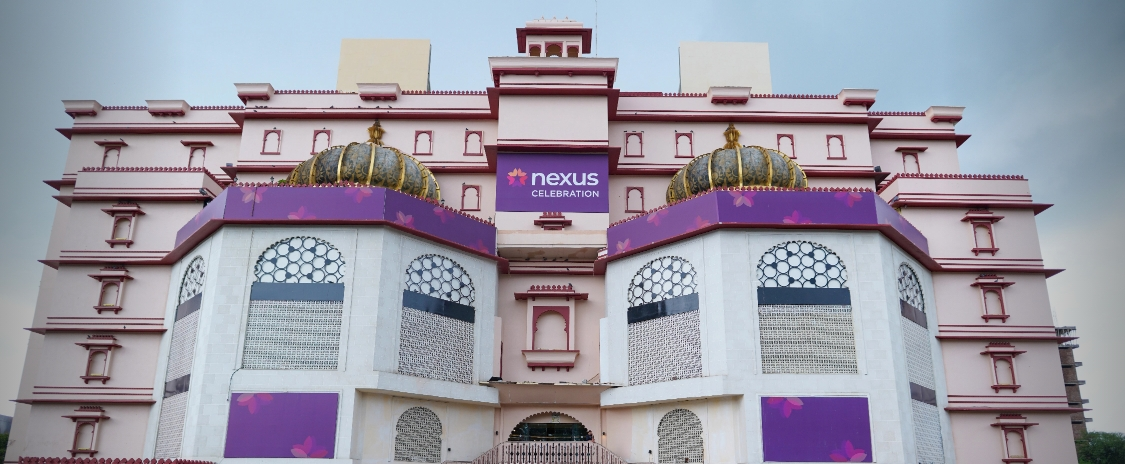
Nexus Celebration Mall

== Tamil Nadu ==
| Name | Location | Year | Size (gross leasable area) | Source |
|---|---|---|---|---|
| Phoenix Marketcity | Velachery, Chennai | 2013 | 1,000,000 sq ft (93,000 m^{2}) | |
| VR Chennai | Anna Nagar West, Chennai | 2018 | 1,000,000 sq ft (93,000 m^{2}) | |
| Express Avenue | Whites Road, Royapettah, Chennai | 2010 | 900,000 sq ft (84,000 m^{2}) | |
| Nexus Vijaya | Arcot Road, Vadapalani, Chennai | 2013 | 650,000 sq ft (60,000 m^{2}) | |
| Gold Souk Grandé Mall Chennai | GST Road, Vandalur, Chennai | 2015 | 600,000 sq ft (56,000 m^{2}) | |
| Marina Mall | Old Mahabalipuram Road, Egattur, Chennai | 2019 | 540,000 sq ft (50,000 m^{2}) | |
| Spencer Plaza | Anna Salai, Chennai | 1895 | 530,000 sq ft (49,000 m^{2}) | |
| Prozone Mall | Sivanandapuram, Coimbatore | 2017 | 500,000 sq ft (46,000 m^{2}) | |
| Brookefields Mall | Brooke Bond Road, Coimbatore | 2009 | 450,000 sq ft (42,000 m^{2}) | |
| Fun Republic Mall | Avinashi Road, Peelamedu, Coimbatore | 2012 | 325,000 sq ft (30,200 m^{2}) | |
| Ampa Skywalk | Poonamallee High Road, Aminjikarai, Chennai | 2009 | 315,000 sq ft (29,300 m^{2}) | |
| Vivira Mall | Navalur, OMR, Chennai | 2011 | 300,000 sq ft (28,000 m^{2}) | |
| Ramee Mall | Anna Salai, Teynampet, Chennai | 2012 | 225,000 sq ft (20,900 m^{2}) | |
| Palladium Mall, Chennai | Velachery, Chennai | 2008 | 220,000 sq ft (20,000 m^{2}) | |
| Vishaal de Mal | Chinna Chockikulam, Madurai | 2012 | 220,000 sq ft (20,000 m^{2}) | |
| Spectrum Mall (formerly Grand Venus Mall) | Paper Mills Road, Perambur, Chennai | 2011 | 160,000 sq ft (15,000 m^{2}) | |
| Chennai Citi Centre | Dr. Radhakrishnan Salai, Mylapore, Chennai | 2006 | 150,000 sq ft (14,000 m^{2}) | |
| Chandra Mall | Arcot Road, Virugambakkam, Chennai | 2011 | 143,130 sq ft (13,297 m^{2}) | |
| BSR Mall | Thoraipakkam, Chennai | 2020 | 140,000 sq ft (13,000 m^{2}) | |
| Milan'em Mall | K.K. Nagar, Madurai | 2009 | 90,000 sq ft (8,400 m^{2}) | |
| Bergamo | Khader Nawaz Khan Road, Nungambakkam, Chennai | 2011 | 30,000 sq ft (2,800 m^{2}) | |

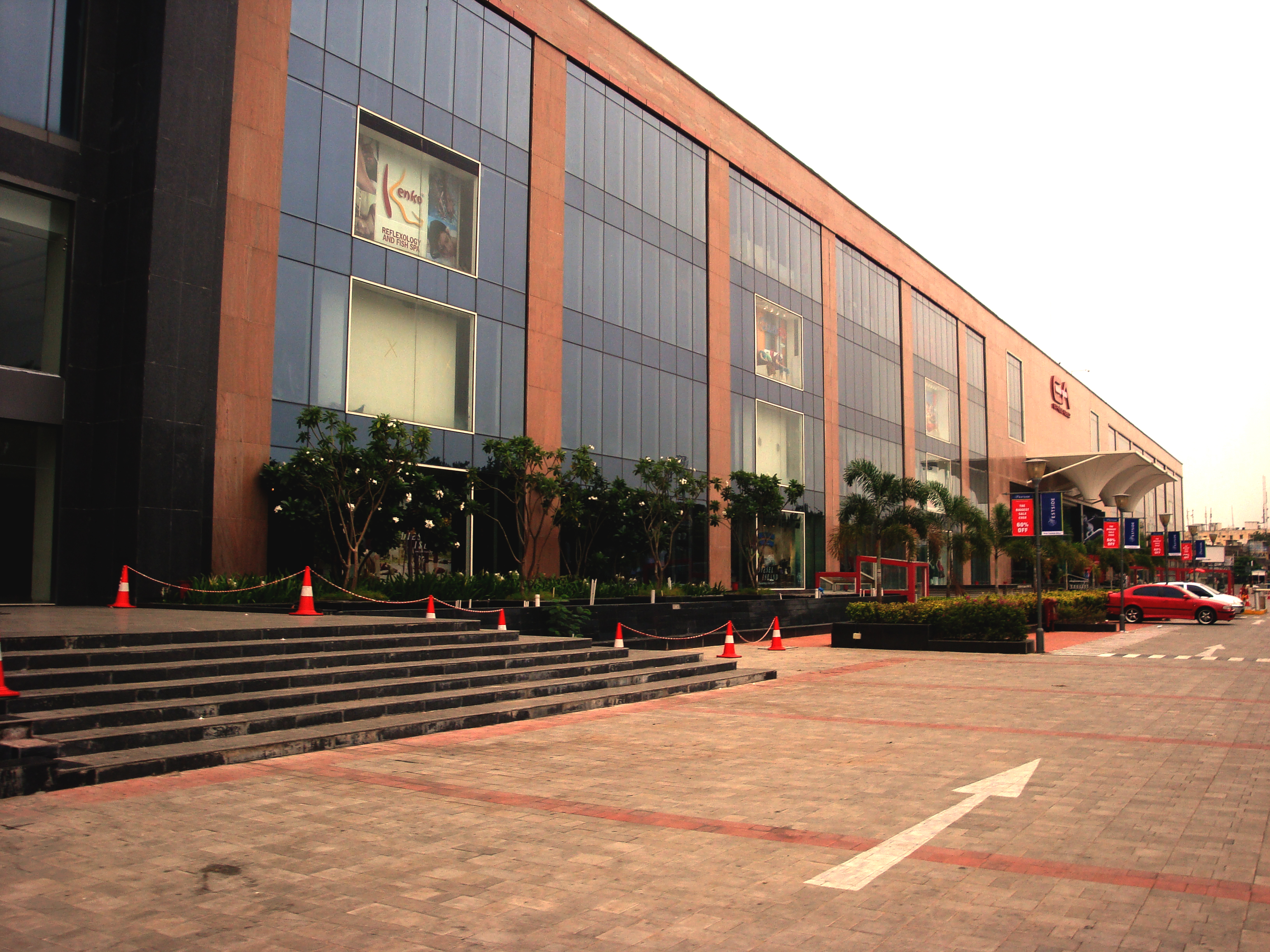
Express Avenue is the second largest mall Chennai

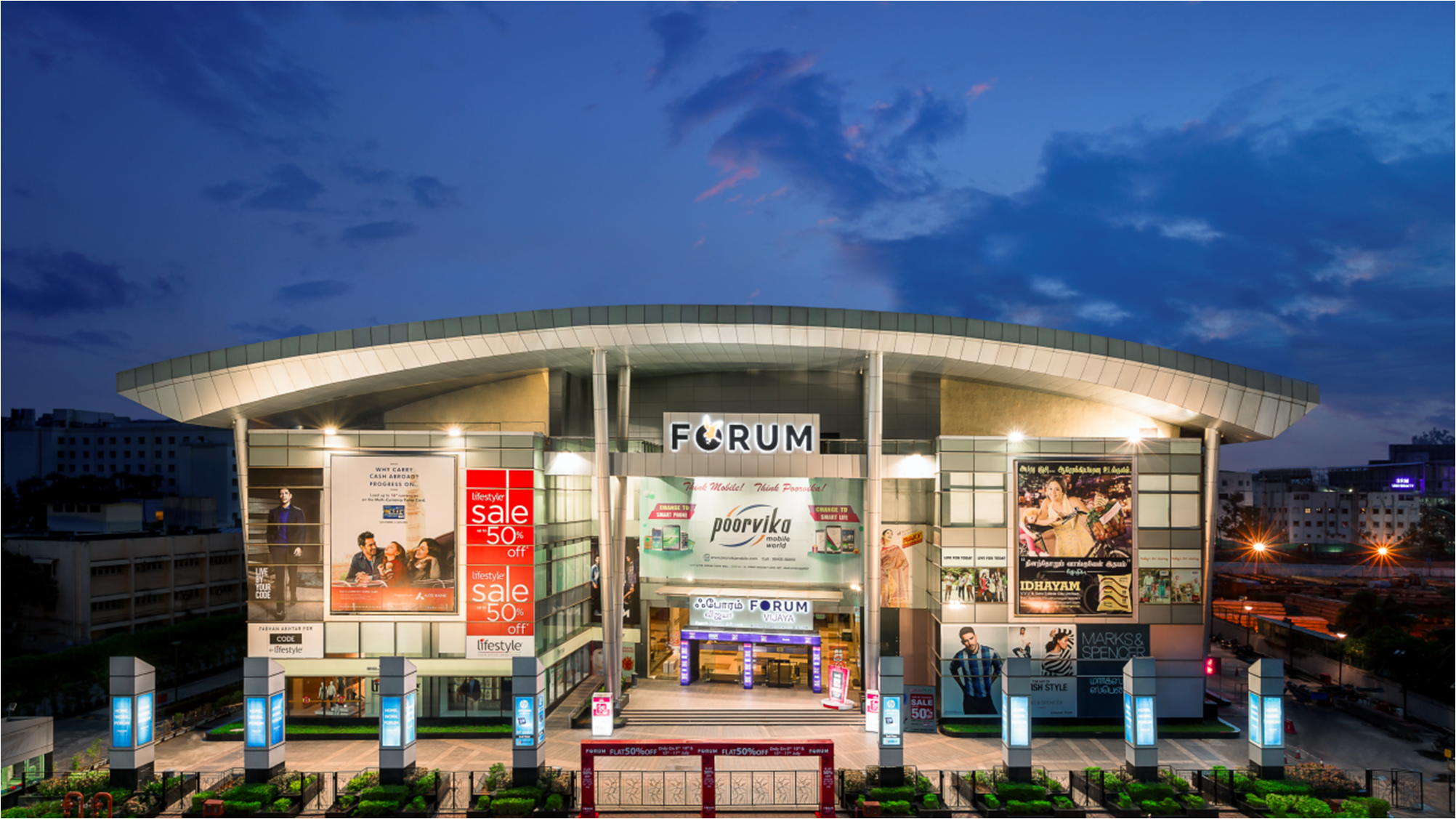
Nexus Vijaya Mall, Chennai

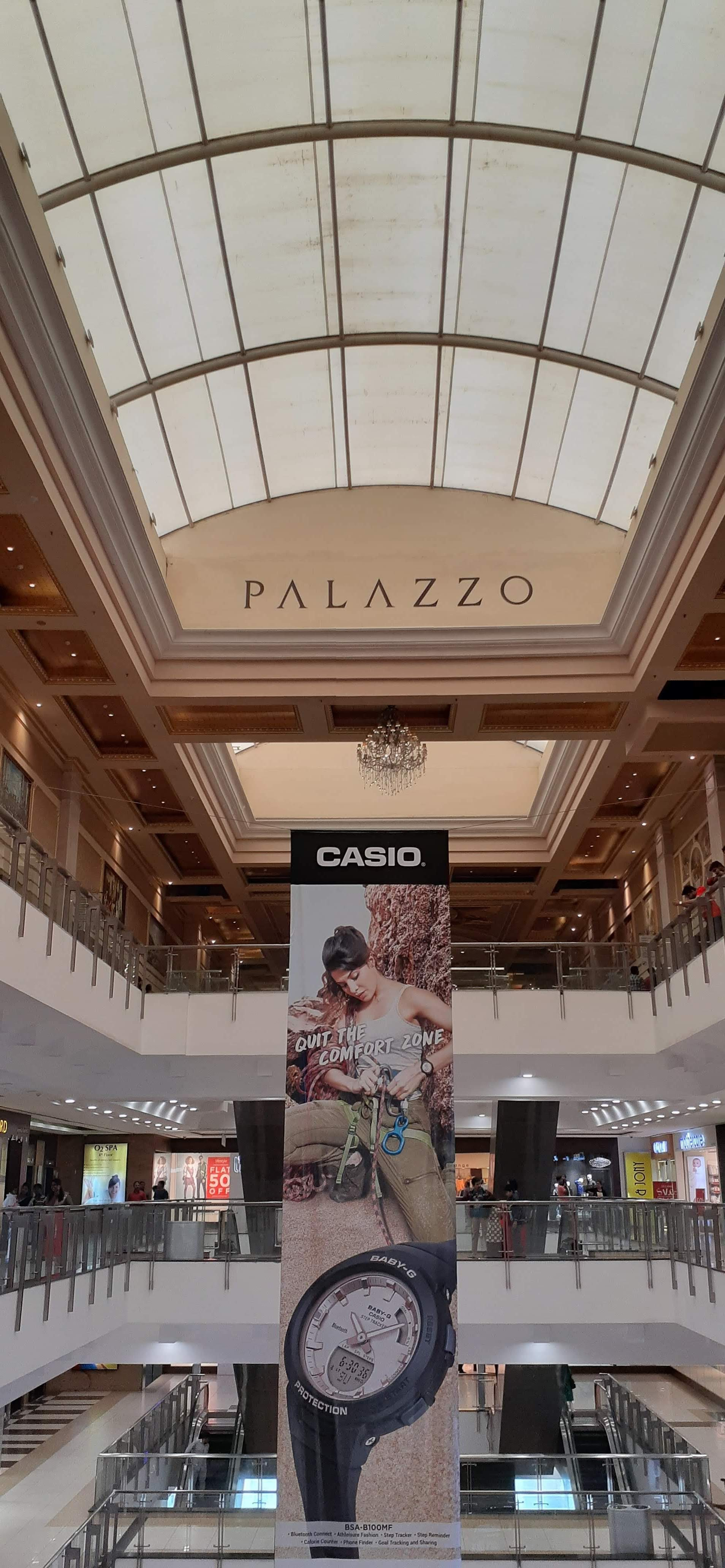
Inside Nexus Vijaya shopping mall, Vadapalani, Chennai, Tamil Nadu, India
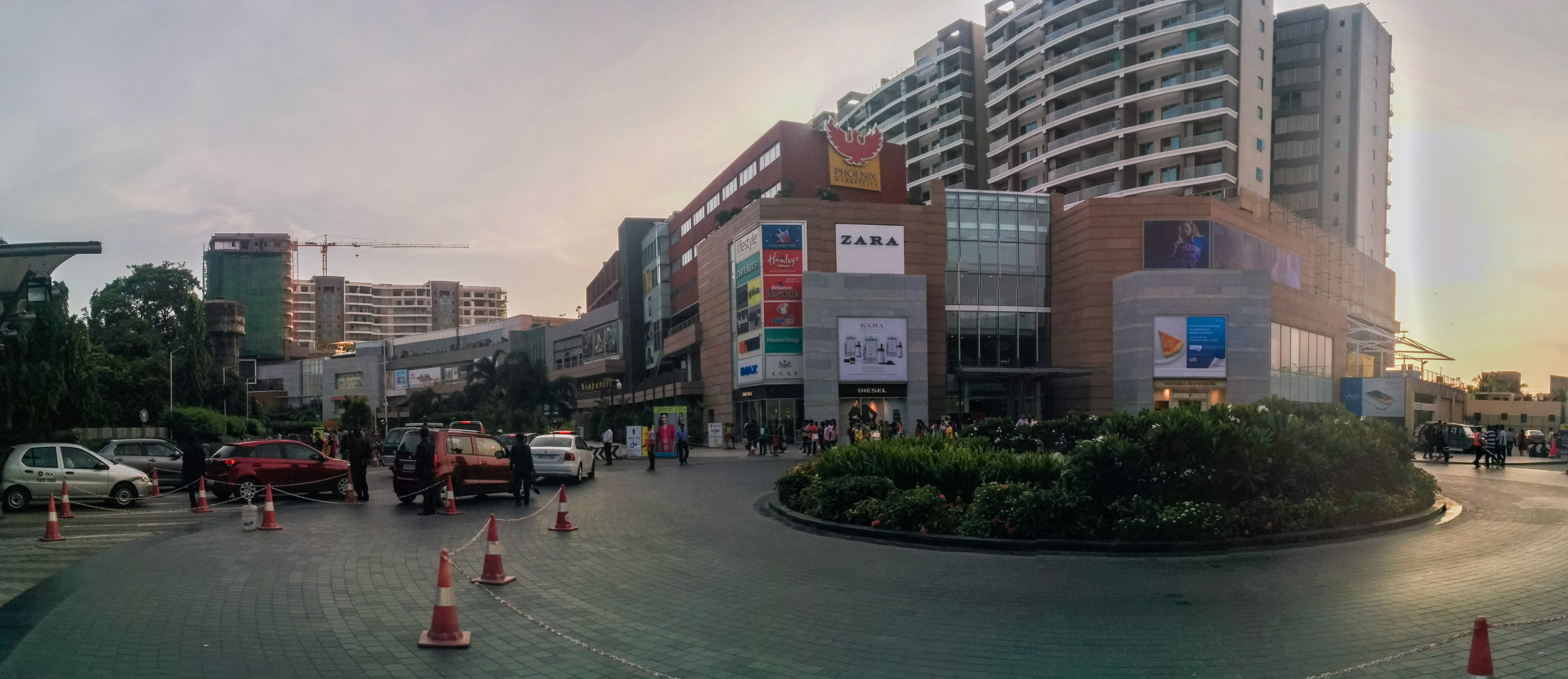
Phoenix Marketcity dusk view

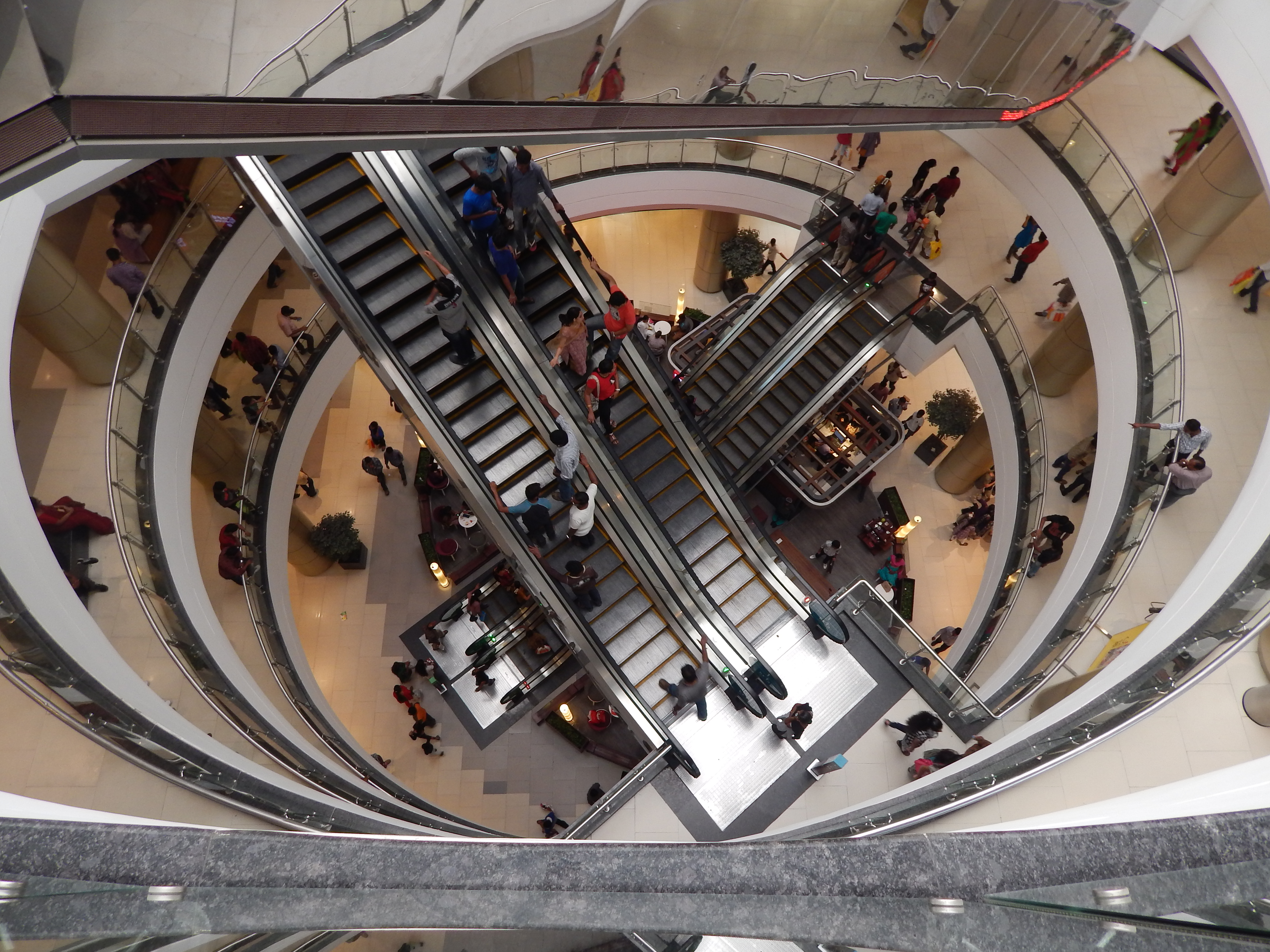
Inside view of Phoenix Marketcity

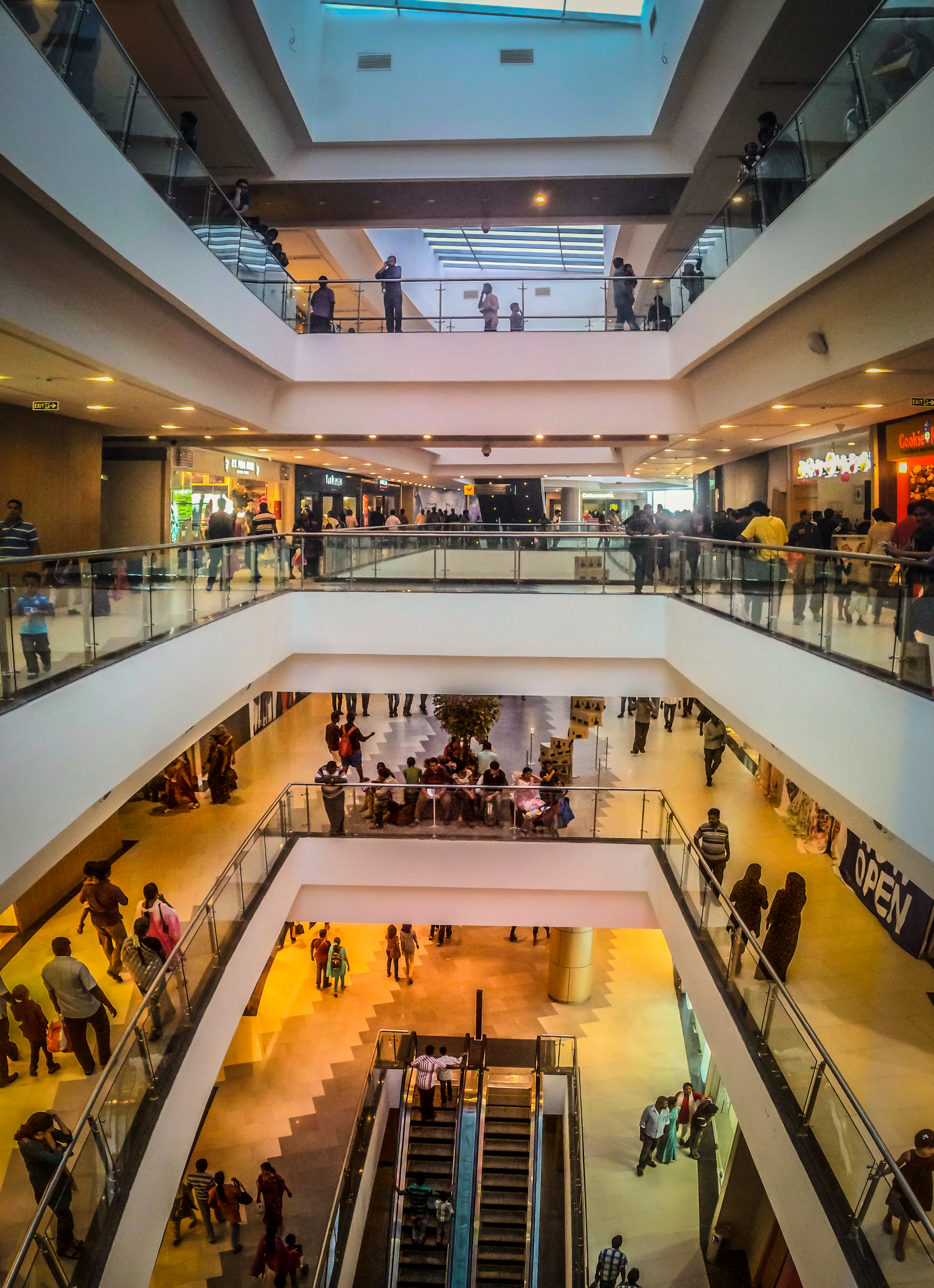
Interior view of Phoenix Marketcity

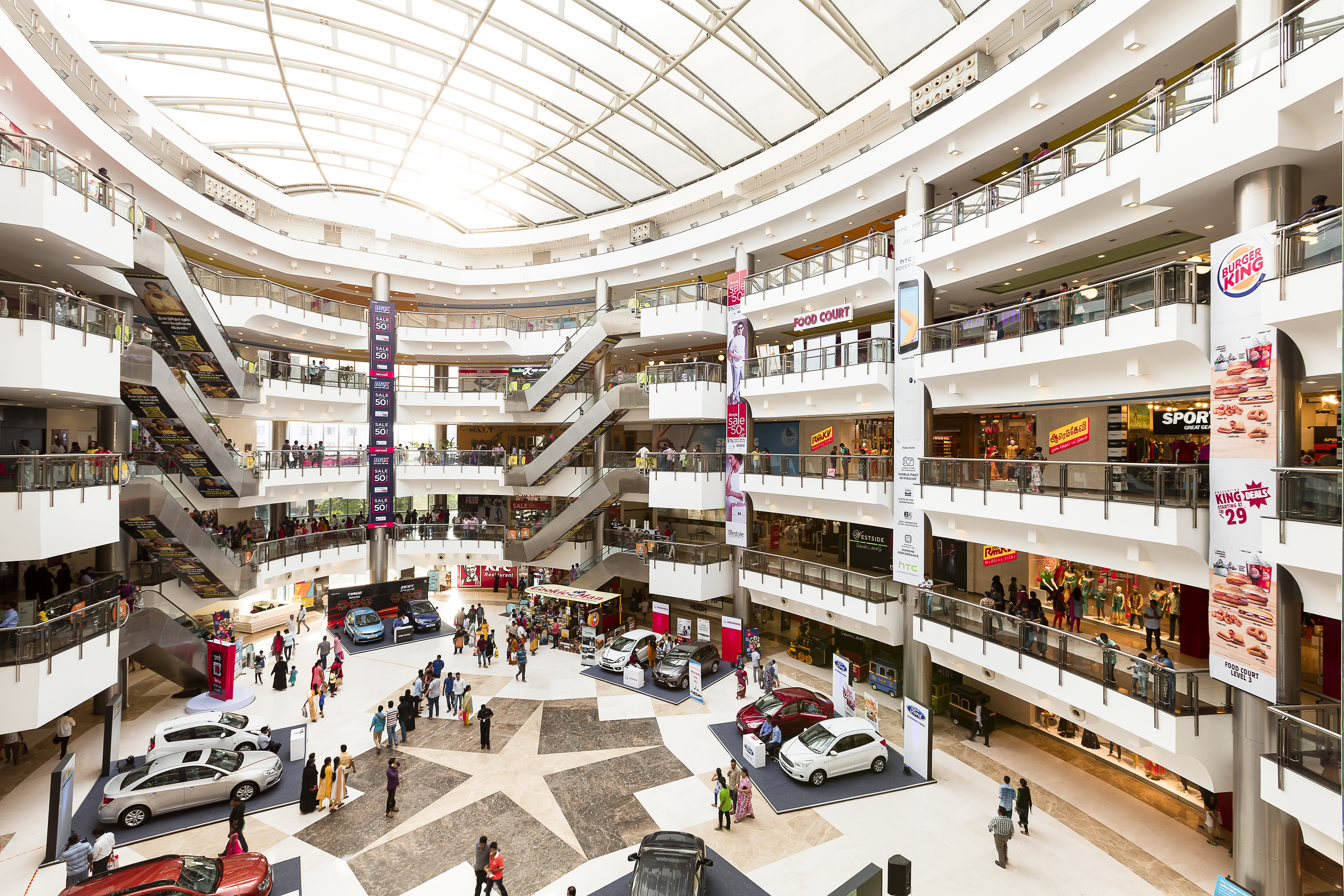
Nexus Vijaya Mall central atrium

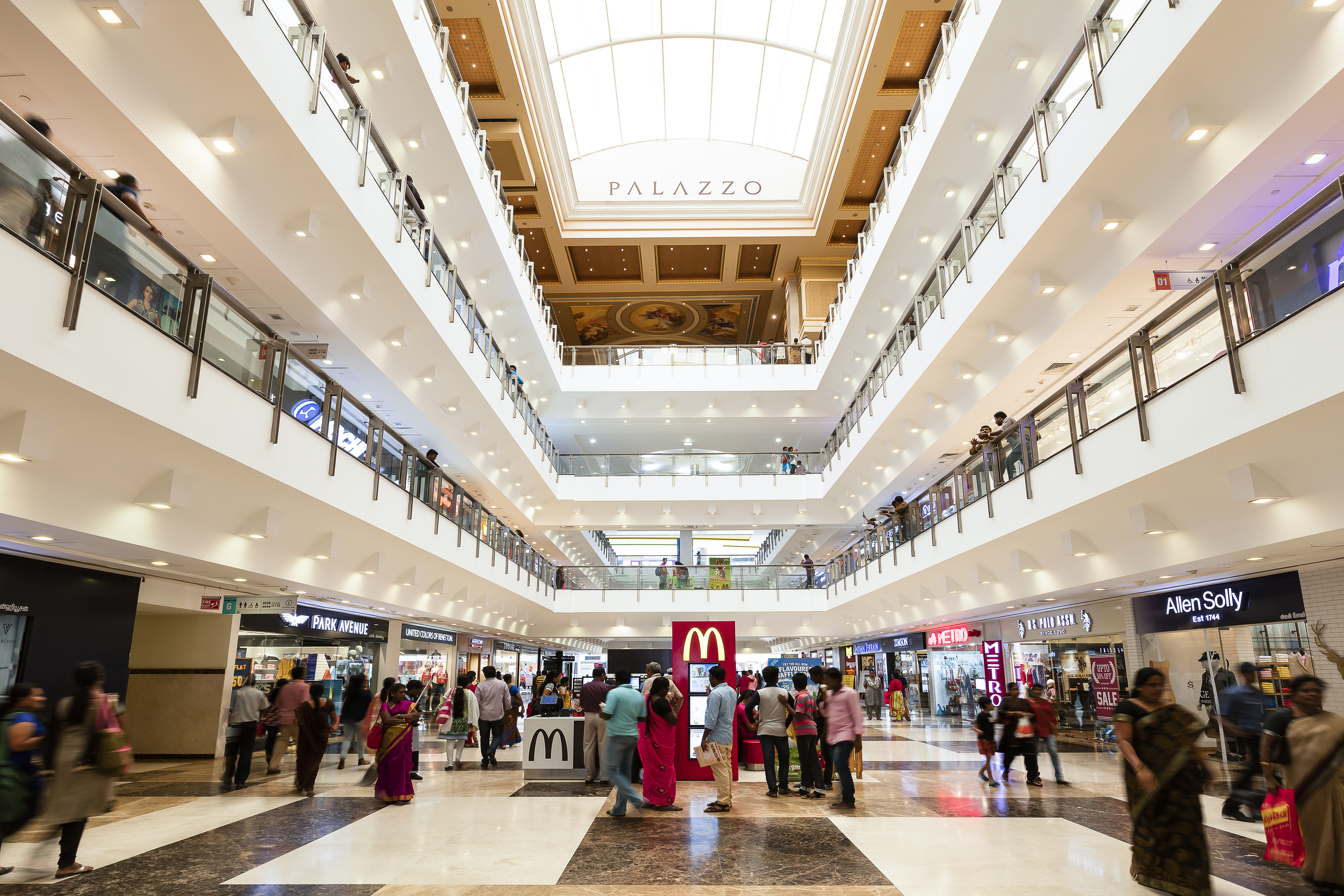
Nexus Vijaya Mall inside view

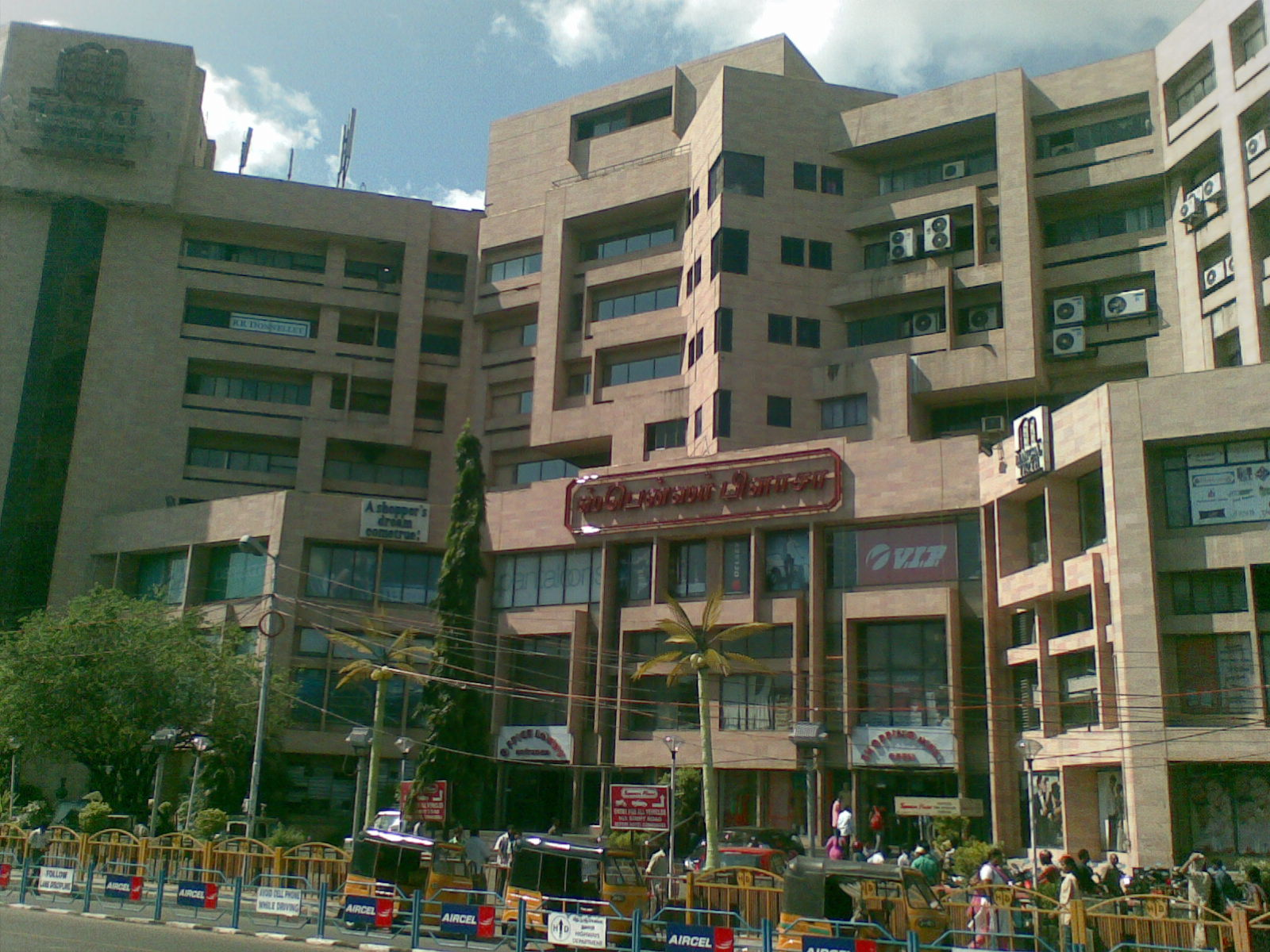
Spencer Plaza, Chennai

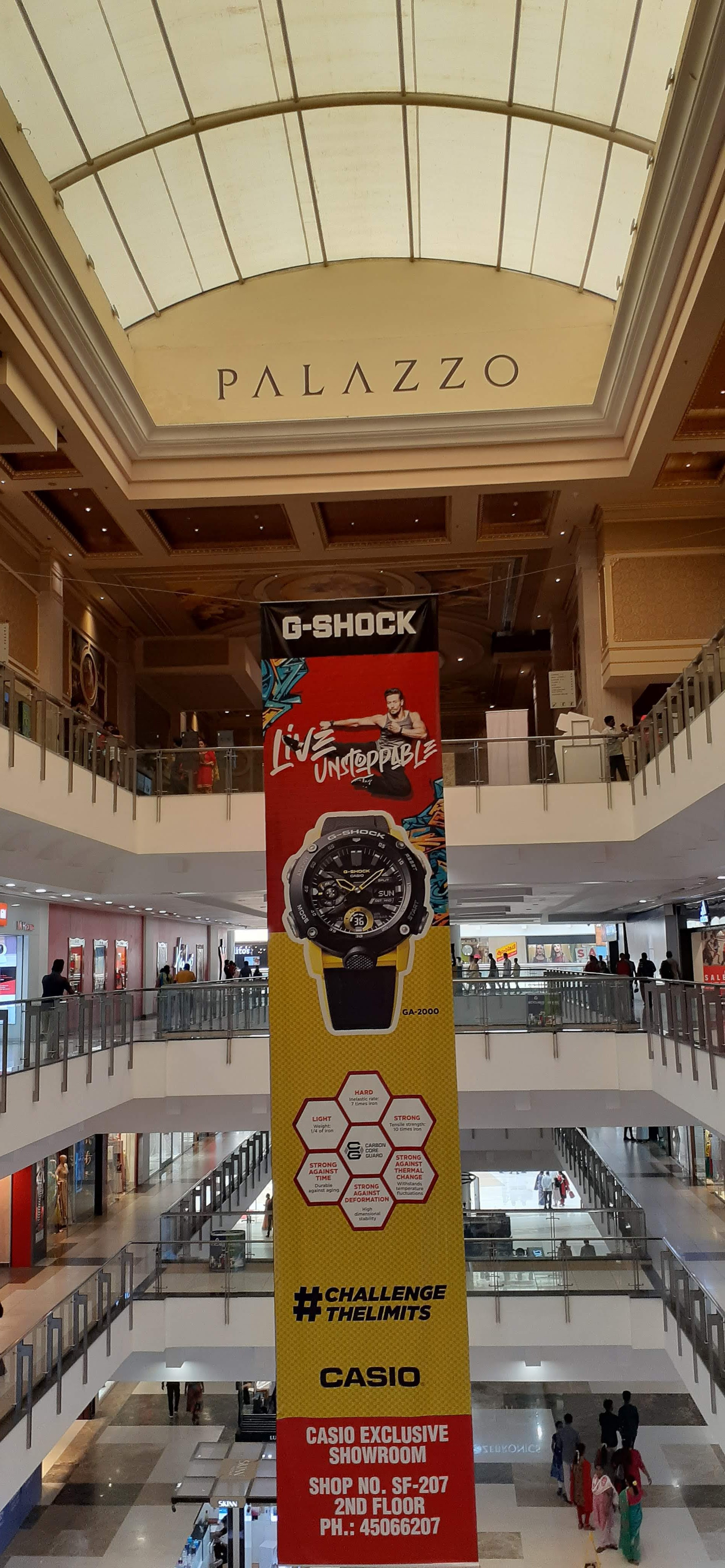
Inside the Nexus Vijaya, Chennai

== Telangana ==
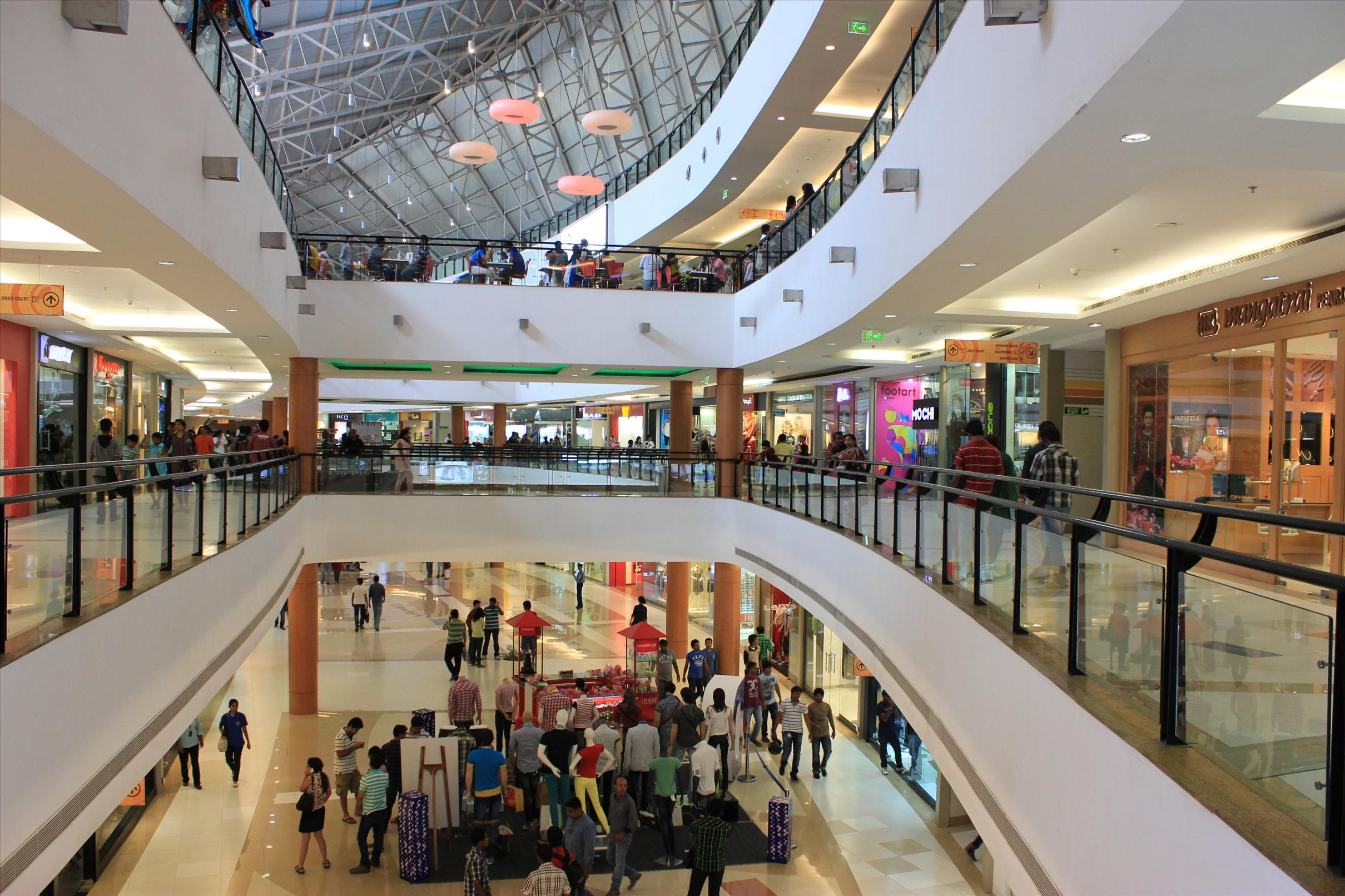
Inside view, Inorbit Mall, Hyderabad

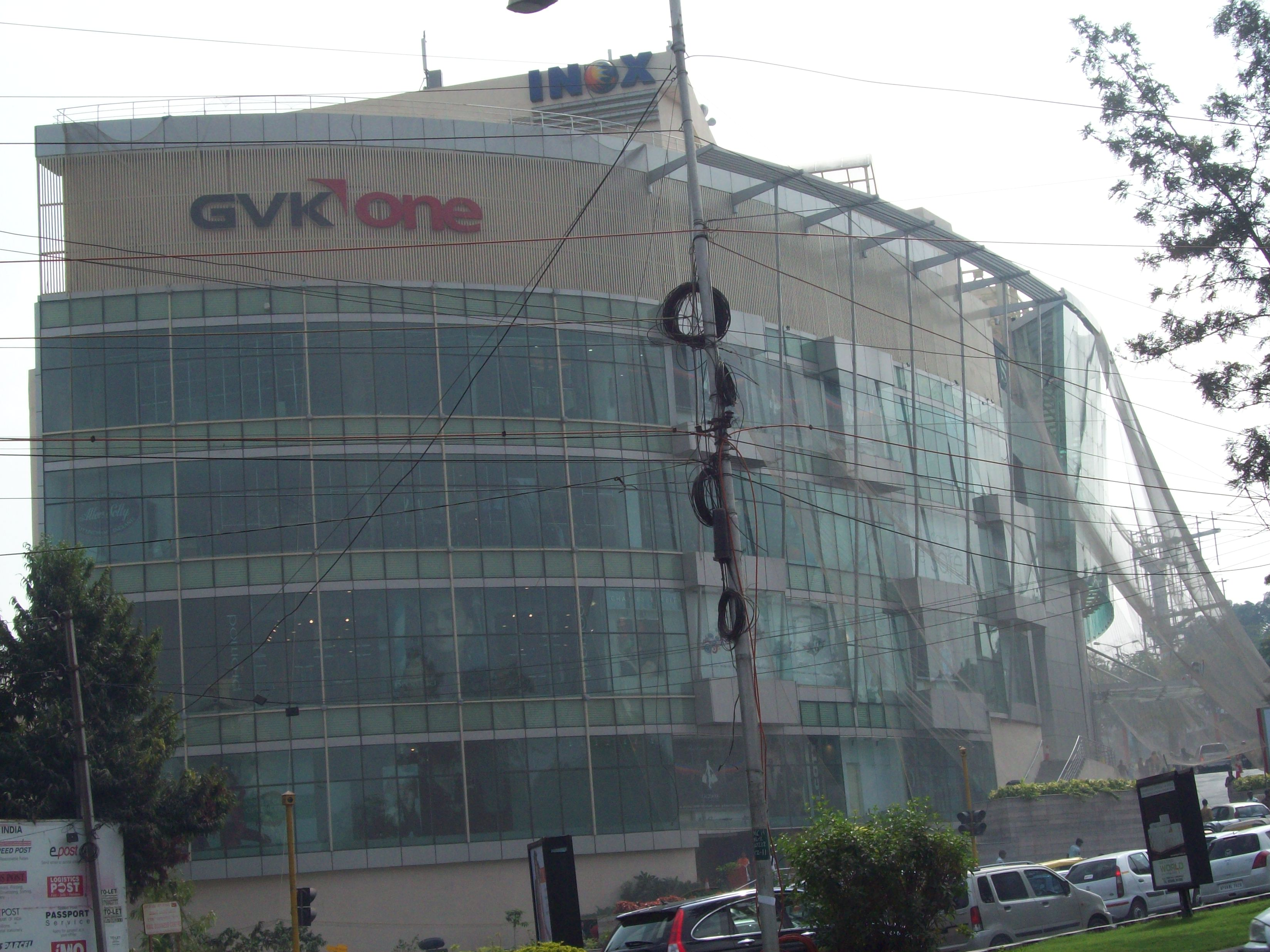
GVK One Mall outside view

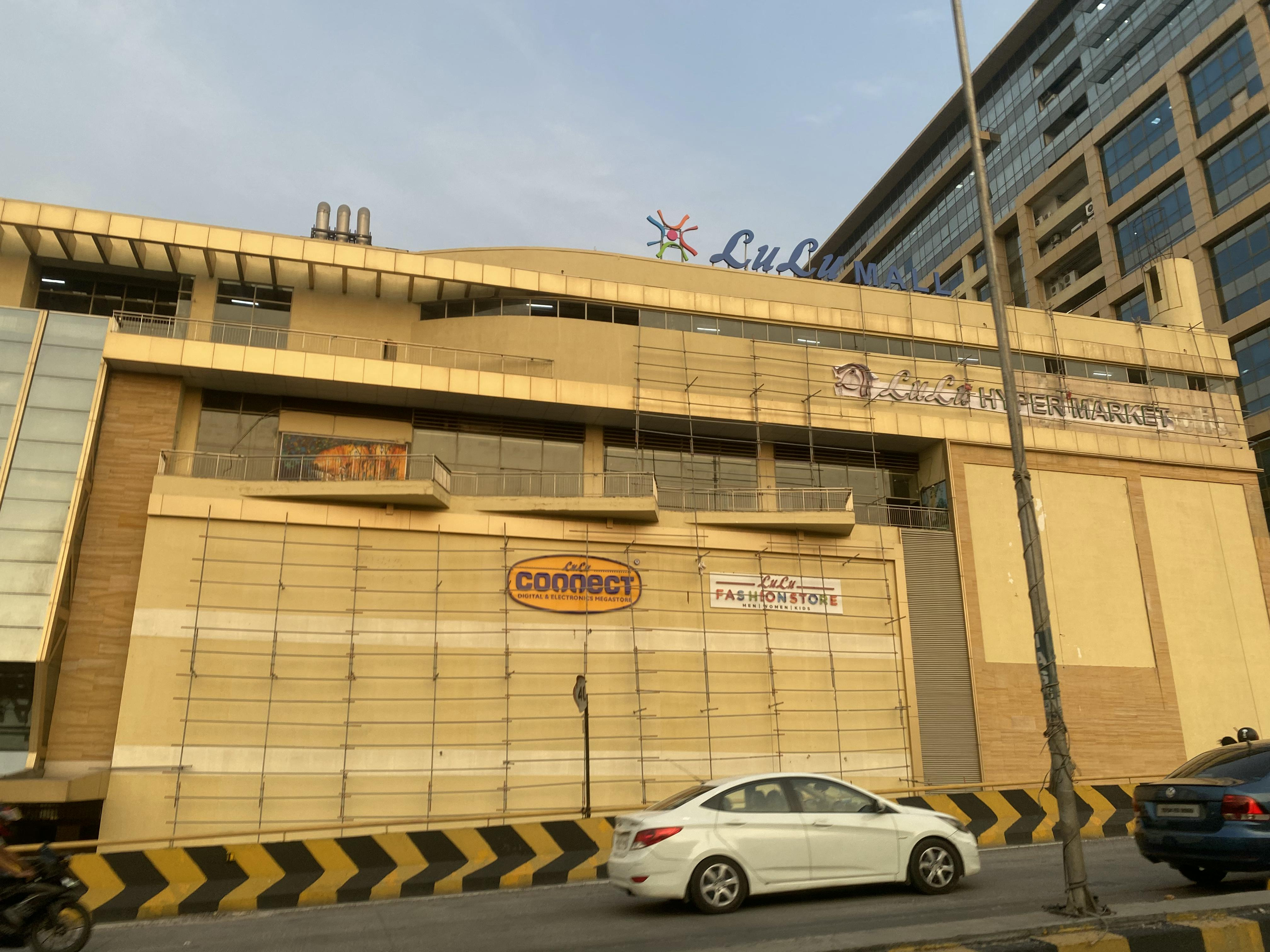
Lulu Mall, Hyderabad view from flyover

| Name | Location | Year | Size (gross leasable area) | Source |
|---|---|---|---|---|
| Sarath City Capital Mall | Kondapur, Hyderabad | 2018 | 2,700,000 sq ft (250,000 m^{2}) | |
| Nexus Hyderabad Mall | Kukatpally, Hyderabad | 2014 | 820,000 sq ft (76,000 m^{2}) | |
| Inorbit Mall, Cyberabad | Raheja Mindspace, Madhapur, Hyderabad | 2009 | 800,000 sq ft (74,000 m^{2}) | |
| Aparna Neo Mall | Nallagandla, Hyderabad | 2024 | 631,000 sq ft (58,600 m^{2}) | |
| Lulu Mall, Hyderabad | Kukatpally, Hyderabad | 2023 | 450,000 sq ft (42,000 m^{2}) | |
| GVK One | Banjara Hills, Hyderabad | 2009 | 320,000 sq ft (30,000 m^{2}) | |
| GSM Mall | Madeenaguda, Hyderabad | 2017 | 320,000 sq ft (30,000 m^{2}) | |
| Podium Mall | Tolichowki, Hyderabad | 2017 | 300,000 sq ft (28,000 m^{2}) | |
| NSL Centrum Mall | KPHB Colony, Hyderabad | 2010 | 257,000 sq ft (23,900 m^{2}) | |
| City Centre Mall | Banjara Hills, Hyderabad | 2011 | 250,000 sq ft (23,000 m^{2}) | |
| PVR Next Galleria Mall | Panjagutta, Hyderabad | 2018 | 200,000 sq ft (19,000 m^{2}) | |
| Next Galleria Mall Moosarambagh | Moosarambagh, Hyderabad | 2019 | 200,000 sq ft (19,000 m^{2}) | |
| E-Galleria Mall | Hitech City, Hyderabad | 2018 | 200,000 sq ft (19,000 m^{2}) | |
| Hyderabad Central | Panjagutta, Hyderabad | 2004 | 150,000 sq ft (14,000 m^{2}) | |
| Prasads Mall | Khairatabad, Hyderabad | 2003 | 110,000 sq ft (10,000 m^{2}) | |
| Atrium Mall | Gachibowli, Hyderabad | 2019 | 110,000 sq ft (10,000 m^{2}) | |
| Venu Mall | Pragathi Nagar, Nizamabad | 2020 | 110,000 sq ft (10,000 m^{2}) | |
| Gachibowli Central | Gachibowli, Hyderabad | 2011 | 100,000 sq ft (9,300 m^{2}) | |
| Raichandani Mall | Kompally, Hyderabad | 2023 | 42,382 sq ft (3,937.4 m^{2}) | |

== Uttar Pradesh ==
| Name | Location | Year | Size (gross leasable area) | Source |
|---|---|---|---|---|
| Lulu Mall, Lucknow | Sushant Golf City, Sector B Ansal API, Lucknow | 2022 | 2,000,000 sq ft (190,000 m^{2}) | |
| DLF Mall of India | Sector-18, Noida | 2016 | 2,000,000 sq ft (190,000 m^{2}) | |
| Phoenix Palassio | Sector-7, Shaheed Path, Gomti Nagar Extension, Lucknow | 2020 | 1,000,000 sq ft (93,000 m^{2}) | |
| The Great India Place | Sector-38, Noida | 2007 | 1,000,000 sq ft (93,000 m^{2}) | |
| Saya Status Mall | Sector-129, Noida | 2025 | 1,000,000 sq ft (93,000 m^{2}) | |
| Fun Republic Mall | Vipin Khand, Lohia Path, Gomti Nagar, Lucknow | 2007 | 947,000 sq ft (88,000 m^{2}) | |
| The Grand Venice Mall | Kasna Gol Chakkar, Surajpur-Kasna Road, Greater Noida | 2015 | 947,000 sq ft (88,000 m^{2}) | |
| Z Square Mall | Bada Chauraha, Kanpur | 2010 | 900,000 sq ft (84,000 m^{2}) | |
| Gaur City Mall, Greater Noida | Gaur Chowk, Sector-4, Greater Noida | 2019 | 861,000 sq ft (80,000 m^{2}) | |
| Ansal Plaza, Greater Noida | Pari Chowk, Amit Nagar, Greater Noida | 2009 | 750,000 sq ft (70,000 m^{2}) | |
| Logix City Centre | Wave City Centre, Sector-32, Noida | 2016 | 600,000 sq ft (56,000 m^{2}) | |
| Pacific Mall, Ghaziabad | Sahibabad, Ghaziabad | 2005 | 500,000 sq ft (46,000 m^{2}) | |
| MSX Mall | Swarn Nagari, Greater Noida | 2013 | 500,000 sq ft (46,000 m^{2}) | |
| World Square Mall | Mohan Nagar, Ghaziabad | 2014 | 600,000 sq ft (56,000 m^{2}) | |
| Omaxe Connaught Place | Jangra Chowk, Beta II, Greater Noida | 2011 | 572,000 sq ft (53,100 m^{2}) | |
| Mahagun Metro Mall | Sector-3, Vaishali, Ghaziabad | 2011 | 455,000 sq ft (42,300 m^{2}) | |
| Shopprix Mall, Meerut | Surya Place Colony, Meerut | 2013 | 450,000 sq ft (42,000 m^{2}) | |
| Sahara Ganj Mall | Prem Nagar, Shahnajaf Road, Hazratganj, Lucknow | 2005 | 440,000 sq ft (41,000 m^{2}) | |
| One Awadh Center | Vibhuti Khand, Shaheed Path, Gomti Nagar, Lucknow | 2015 | 400,000 sq ft (37,000 m^{2}) | |
| East Delhi Mall | Kaushambi, Ghaziabad | 2004 | 392,000 sq ft (36,400 m^{2}) | |
| Gardens Galleria, Noida | Sector-38, Noida | 2015 | 385,000 sq ft (35,800 m^{2}) | |
| Shipra Mall | Vaibhav Khand, Indirapuram, Ghaziabad | 2007 | 360,000 sq ft (33,000 m^{2}) | |
| Phoenix United, Lucknow | Sector-B, LDA Colony, Kanpur Road, Lucknow | 2010 | 330,000 sq ft (31,000 m^{2}) | |
| Wave Mall, Lucknow (formerly West End Mall, Lucknow) | Vibhuti Khand, Lohia Path, Gomti Nagar, Lucknow | 2004 | 314,500 sq ft (29,220 m^{2}) | |
| Phoenix United, Bareilly | Pilibhit Bypass Road, Mahanagar Colony, Bareilly | 2016 | 310,000 sq ft (29,000 m^{2}) | |
| City Mall, Lucknow | Vipul Khand, Gomti Nagar, Lucknow | 2021 | 300,000 sq ft (28,000 m^{2}) | |
| VVIP Style Mall | Raj Nagar Extension, Ghaziabad | 2015 | 270,000 sq ft (25,000 m^{2}) | |
| Eros Marketplace | Niti Khand, Indirapuram, Ghaziabad | 2011 | 265,000 sq ft (24,600 m^{2}) | |
| Wave Mall, Noida (formerly Centre Stage Mall, Noida) | Sector-18, Noida | 2003 | 256,000 sq ft (23,800 m^{2}) | |
| Singapore Mall | Viraj Khand, Gomti Nagar, Lucknow | 2016 | 250,000 sq ft (23,000 m^{2}) | |
| Riverside Mall | Vipul Khand, Gomti Nagar, Lucknow | 2009 | 250,000 sq ft (23,000 m^{2}) | |
| Ashok Cosmos Mall | Sanjay Place, Agra | 2000 | 250,000 sq ft (23,000 m^{2}) | |
| Rave@Moti Mall | Rawatpur, Kanpur | 2007 | 250,000 sq ft (23,000 m^{2}) | |
| Aditya City Centre | Vaibhav Khand, Indirapuram, Ghaziabad | 2010 | 240,000 sq ft (22,000 m^{2}) | |
| IP Sigra Mall | Sigra, Varanasi | 2007 | 200,000 sq ft (19,000 m^{2}) | |
| Vinayak Plaza Varanasi | Maldahiya, Varanasi | 2017 | 200,000 sq ft (19,000 m^{2}) | |
| Venus Mall | Golghar, Gorakhpur | 2017 | 200,000 sq ft (19,000 m^{2}) | |
| Orion Mall Gorakhpur | Mohaddipur, Gorakhpur | 2017 | 200,000 sq ft (19,000 m^{2}) | |
| Ansal Plaza, Ghaziabad | Dabur Chowk, Vaishali, Ghaziabad | 2005 | 200,000 sq ft (19,000 m^{2}) | |
| Vinayak City Centre, Prayagraj | Civil Lines, Prayagraj | 2007 | 200,000 sq ft (19,000 m^{2}) | |
| City Square Mall | Roorkee Road, Meerut | 2014 | 200,000 sq ft (19,000 m^{2}) | |
| Omaxe SRK Mall (Sarv Multiplex) | Khandari, Agra | 2010 | 199,000 sq ft (18,500 m^{2}) | |
| Great Mall of Aligarh (formerly Great Value Mall) | Ramghat Road, Sukhravali, Aligarh | 2013 | 180,000 sq ft (17,000 m^{2}) | |
| South X Mall | Kidwai Nagar, Kanpur | 2009 | 163,475 sq ft (15,187.3 m^{2}) | |
| Modi Mall | Sector-25A, Noida | 2013 | 150,000 sq ft (14,000 m^{2}) | |
| Singapore Mall | Viraj Khand, Gomti Nagar, Lucknow | 2016 | 150,000 sq ft (14,000 m^{2}) | |
| Gardens Galleria, Lucknow | South City, Raebareli Road, Lucknow | 2019 | 150,000 sq ft (14,000 m^{2}) | |
| The Opulent Mall | GT Road, Nehru Nagar, Ghaziabad | 2009 | 145,000 sq ft (13,500 m^{2}) | |
| PVS Mall | Shastri Nagar, Meerut | 2012 | 140,000 sq ft (13,000 m^{2}) | |
| Habitech Crystal Mall | Gujarpur, Knowledge Park III, Greater Noida | 2016 | 130,000 sq ft (12,000 m^{2}) | |
| Shopprix Mall, Ghaziabad | Sector-5, Vaishali, Ghaziabad | 2009 | 125,000 sq ft (11,600 m^{2}) | |
| TDI Mall, Agra | Fatehabad Road, Agra | 2007 | 120,000 sq ft (11,000 m^{2}) | |
| Umaro Mall, Lucknow | Badshahnagar metro station, Mahanagar, Faizabad Road, Lucknow | 2019 | 113,222 sq ft (10,518.7 m^{2}) | |
| Shalimar Gateway Mall | Kanpur Road, Near Alambagh metro station, Lucknow | 2022 | 110,000 sq ft (10,000 m^{2}) | |
| City Mall, Gorakhpur | Mohaddipur, Gorakhpur | 2015 | 110,000 sq ft (10,000 m^{2}) | |
| BKD Square Mall, Gorakhpur | Civil Lines, Gorakhpur | 2015 | 110,000 sq ft (10,000 m^{2}) | |
| IP Vijaya Mall | Bhelupur, Varanasi | 2015 | 110,000 sq ft (10,000 m^{2}) | |
| Crown Mall | Faizabad Road, Chinahat, Lucknow | 2015 | 110,000 sq ft (10,000 m^{2}) | |
| Rave 3 Mall | Parwati Bagla Road, Permat, Kanpur | 2007 | 110,000 sq ft (10,000 m^{2}) | |
| AD Mall Gorakhpur | Near Vijay Chowk, Miyan Bazar, Gorakhpur | 2010 | 100,000 sq ft (9,300 m^{2}) | |
| JHV Mall | Mall Road, Varanasi | 2007 | 100,000 sq ft (9,300 m^{2}) | |
| PDR Mall | Sindhgiribagh, Varanasi | 2009 | 100,000 sq ft (9,300 m^{2}) | |

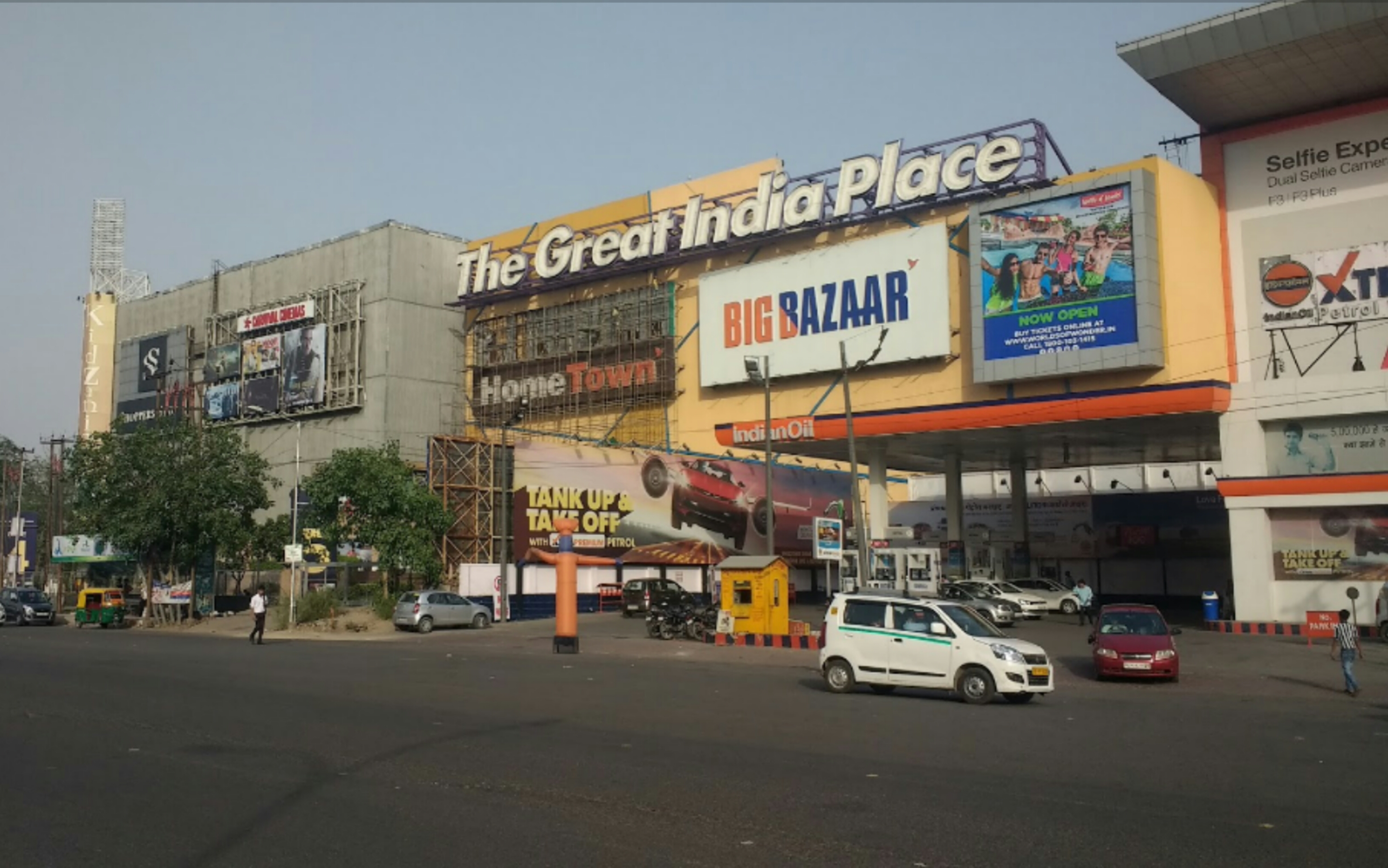
The Great India Place is one of the largest malls in Noida, Delhi NCR

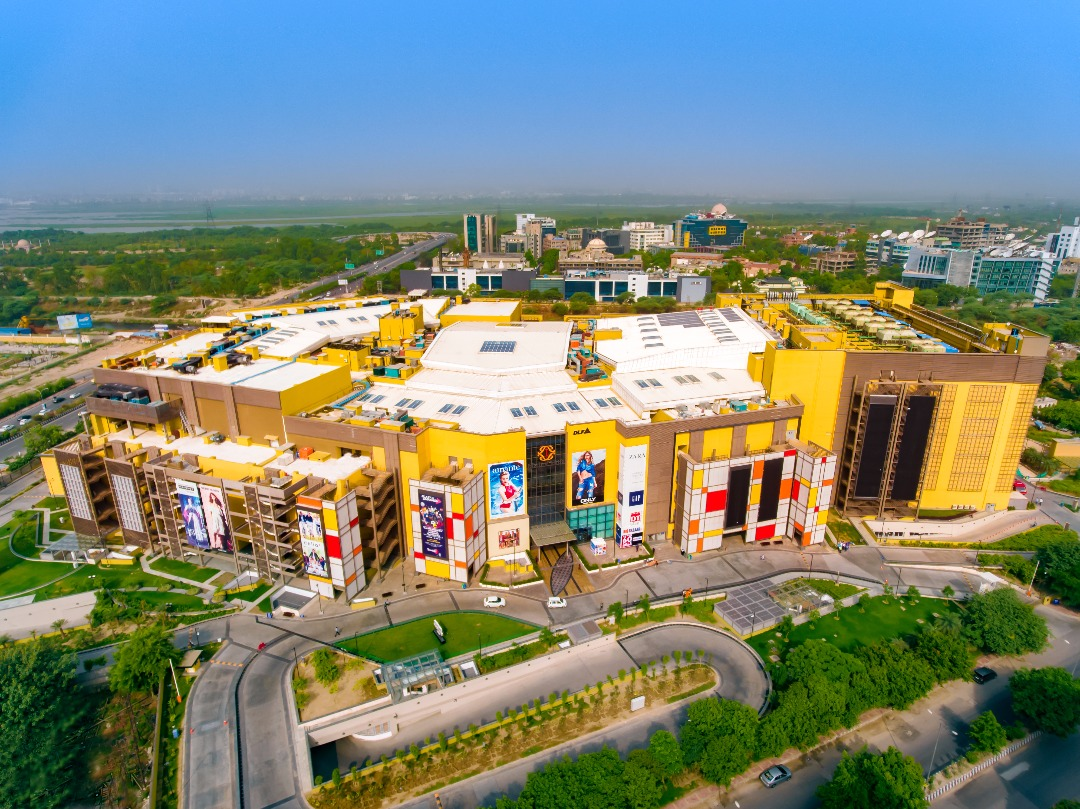
Aerial view, DLF Mall of India, Noida

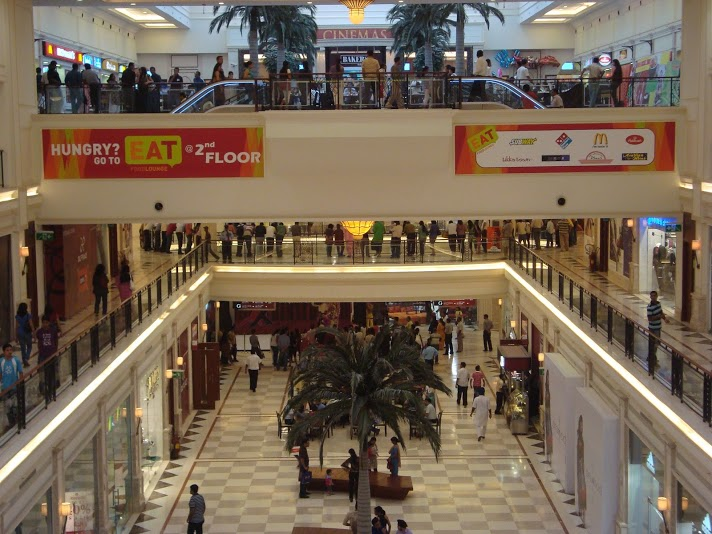
Inside view, DLF Mall of India, Noida

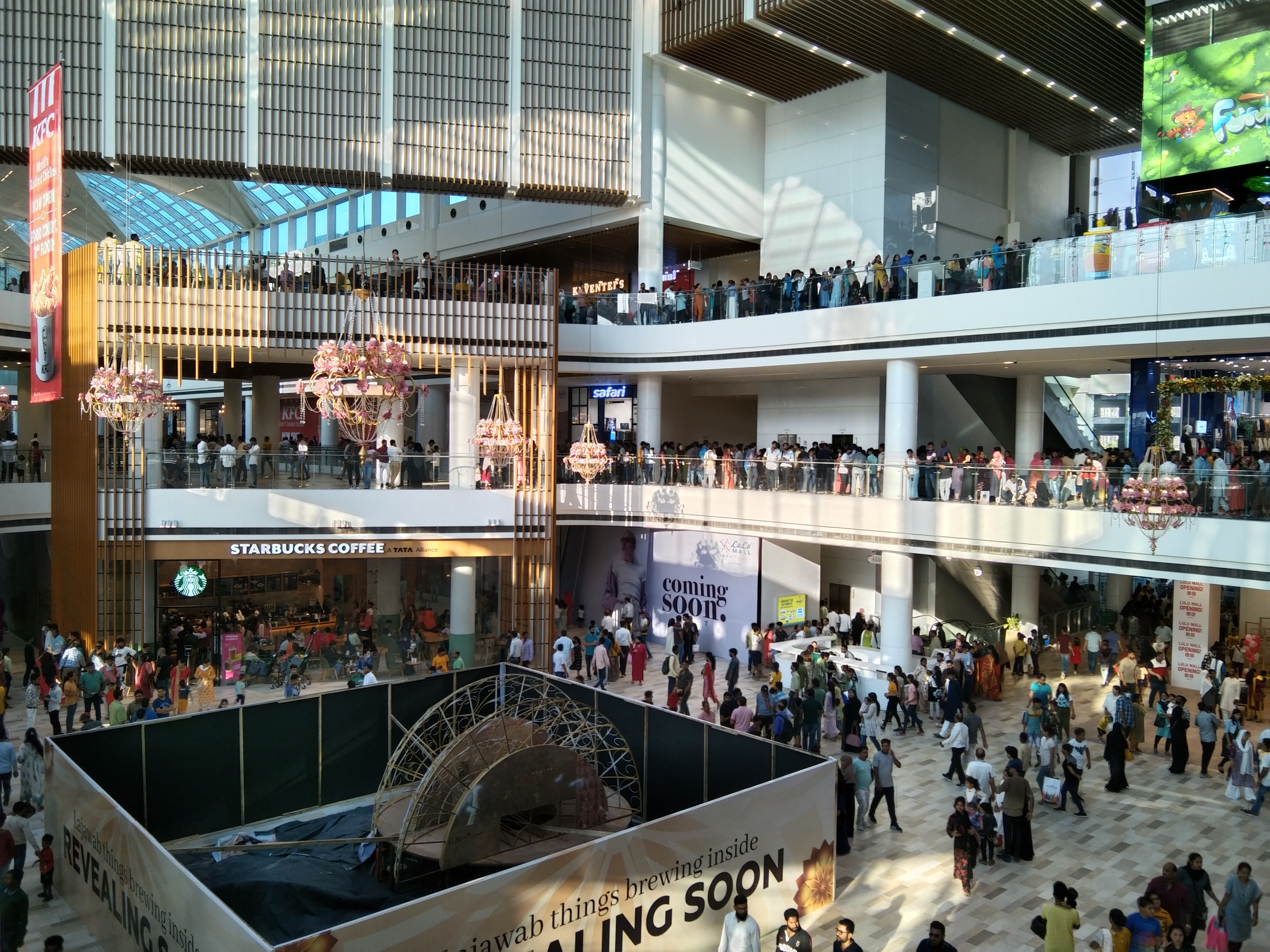
Lulu Mall, Lucknow inside view

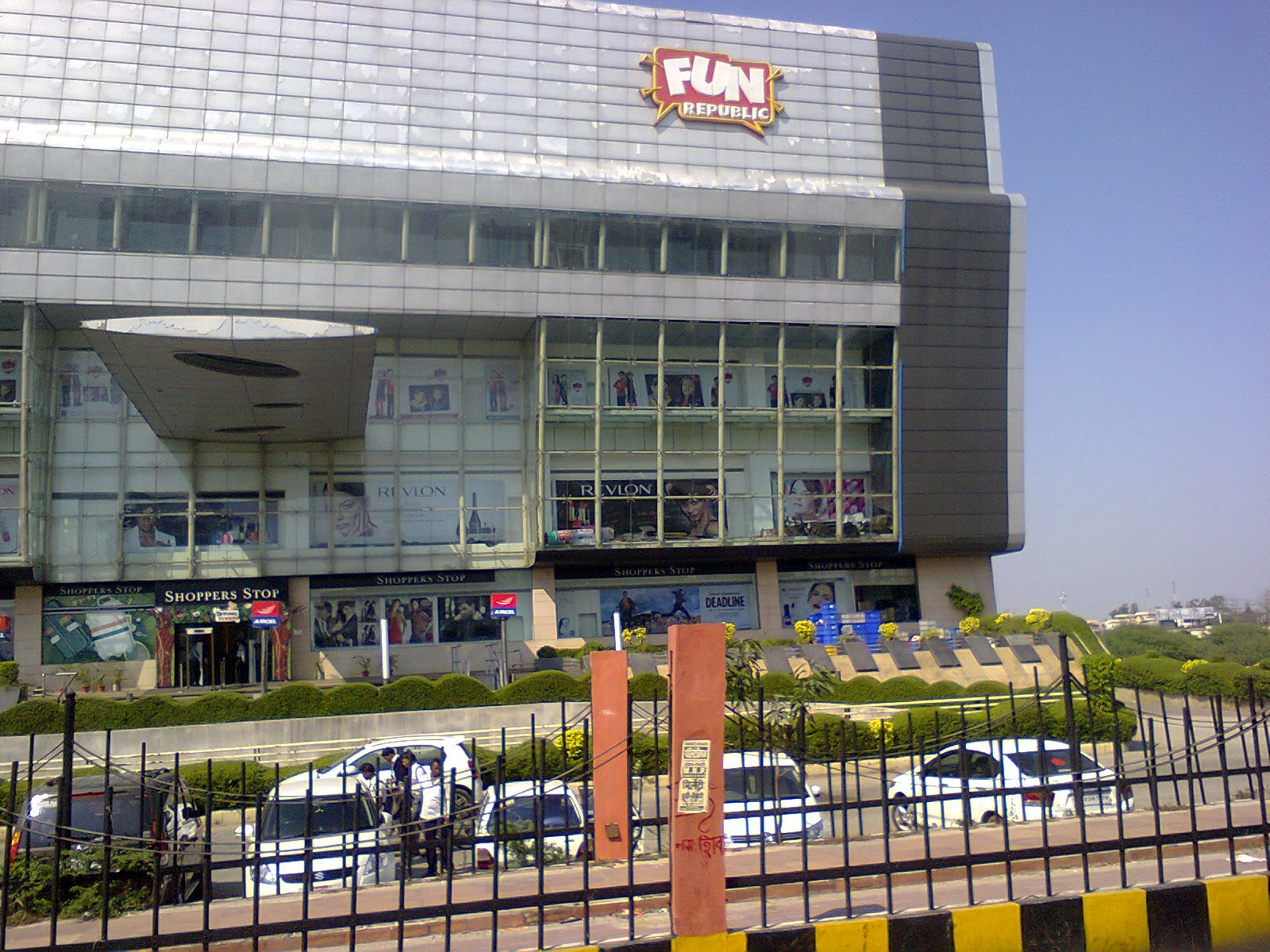
Fun Republic Mall, Gomti Nagar, Lucknow Image 1

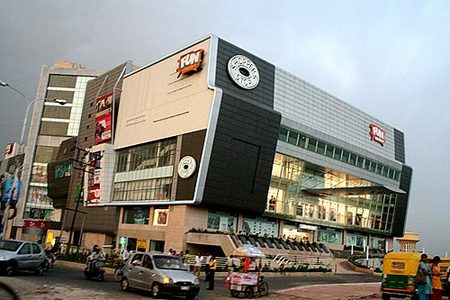
Fun Republic Mall, Gomti Nagar, Lucknow Image 2

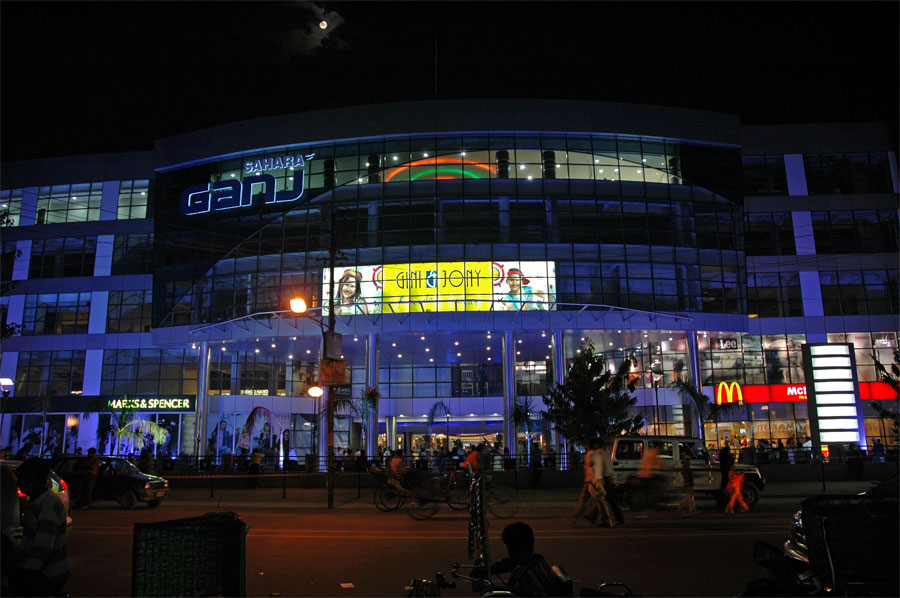
Saharaganj Mall, Lucknow

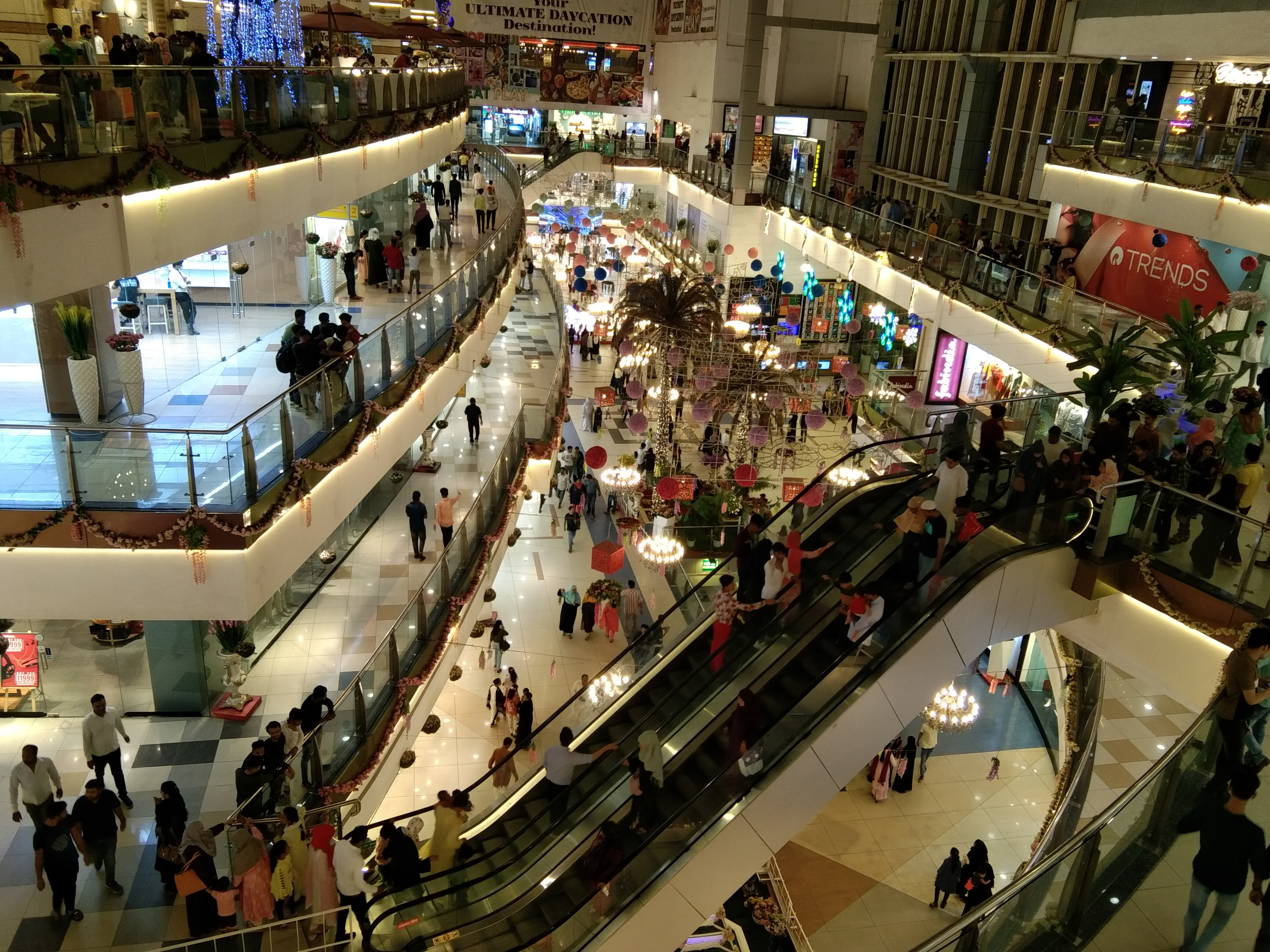
Z Square Mall inside view

== Uttarakhand ==
| Name | Location | Year | Size (gross leasable area) | Source |
|---|---|---|---|---|
| Pacific Mall | Jakhan, Dehradun | 2013 | 300,000 sq ft (28,000 m^{2}) | |
| Crossroads Mall | Old Survey Road, Karanpur, Dehradun | 2010 | 250,000 sq ft (23,000 m^{2}) | |
| Mall of Dehradun | Mohkampur Khurd, Dehradun | 2022 | 150,000 sq ft (14,000 m^{2}) | |

== West Bengal ==
| Name | Location | Year | Size (gross leasable area) | Source |
|---|---|---|---|---|
| South City Mall | Prince Anwar Shah Road, Jodhpur Park, Kolkata | 2008 | 1,000,000 sq ft (93,000 m^{2}) | |
| Mani Square | Kankurgachi, EM Bypass, Kolkata | 2008 | 700,000 sq ft (65,000 m^{2}) | |
| Quest Mall | Beckbagan, Park Circus, Kolkata | 2013 | 700,000 sq ft (65,000 m^{2}) | |
| Avani Riverside Mall | Shibpur, Howrah | 2012 | 600,000 sq ft (56,000 m^{2}) | |
| City Centre, New Town (City Centre 2) | Action Area-2, New Town, Kolkata | 2009 | 500,000 sq ft (46,000 m^{2}) | |
| Axis Mall | Action Area-1, New Town, Kolkata | 2010 | 500,000 sq ft (46,000 m^{2}) | |
| City Centre, Siliguri | Uttorayon Township, Siliguri | 2010 | 500,000 sq ft (46,000 m^{2}) | |
| Junction Mall, Durgapur | City Center, Durgapur | 2011 | 420,000 sq ft (39,000 m^{2}) | |
| 22 Camac Street Mall | Camac Street, Kolkata | 2003 | 400,000 sq ft (37,000 m^{2}) | |
| City Centre, Salt Lake | Sector-1, Salt Lake City, Kolkata | 2004 | 400,000 sq ft (37,000 m^{2}) | |
| Cosmos Mall, Siliguri | Sevoke Road, Siliguri | 2008 | 350,000 sq ft (33,000 m^{2}) | |
| Diamond Plaza, Kolkata | Amarpalli, Jessore Road, Kolkata | 2012 | 350,000 sq ft (33,000 m^{2}) | |
| Rangoli Mall | Belur, Howrah | 2015 | 350,000 sq ft (33,000 m^{2}) | |
| Vega Circle Mall | Sevoke Road, Siliguri | 2016 | 350,000 sq ft (33,000 m^{2}) | |
| Downtown Retail, Uniworld | Action Area-3, Uniworld City, New Town, Kolkata | 2016 | 300,000 sq ft (28,000 m^{2}) | |
| Galaxy Mall, Asansol | Burnpur, Asansol | 2010 | 260,000 sq ft (24,000 m^{2}) | |
| City Centre, Haldia | Balughata Road, Haldia | 2014 | 260,000 sq ft (24,000 m^{2}) | |
| Acropolis Mall, Kolkata | Kasba, Kolkata | 2015 | 270,000 sq ft (25,000 m^{2}) | |
| Lake Mall | Rashbehari Avenue, Kalighat, Kolkata | 2009 | 250,000 sq ft (23,000 m^{2}) | |
| Avani Riverside Mall | Shibpur, Howrah | 2011 | 250,000 sq ft (23,000 m^{2}) | |
| Sentrum Mall, Asansol | Sristi Nagar, Asansol | 2012 | 250,000 sq ft (23,000 m^{2}) | |
| Star Mall, Kolkata | Madhyamgram, Kolkata | 2008 | 237,000 sq ft (22,000 m^{2}) | |
| AMP Baishakhi (Vaishaakkhi) Mall | Sector-2, Salt Lake City, Kolkata | 2014 | 202,150 sq ft (18,780 m^{2}) | |
| PRM Centre Point Mall | Jadupur, Malda | 2025 | 200,000 sq ft (19,000 m^{2}) | |
| Metropolis Mall, Kolkata | Hiland Park, EM Bypass, Kolkata | 2004 | 175,000 sq ft (16,300 m^{2}) | |
| Sentrum Mall, Krishnanagar | Krishnanagar | 2015 | 150,000 sq ft (14,000 m^{2}) | |
| Forum Mall (Forum Courtyard) | Elgin Road, Bhawanipore, Kolkata | 2003 | 125,000 sq ft (11,600 m^{2}) | |
| Downtown Mall, Salt Lake | Sector-3, Salt Lake City, Kolkata | 2009 | 120,000 sq ft (11,000 m^{2}) | |
| Wood Square Mall | Narendrapur, Kolkata | 2015 | 120,000 sq ft (11,000 m^{2}) | |
| Aurobindo Mall | Salkia, Howrah | 2017 | 120,000 sq ft (11,000 m^{2}) | |
| Simpark Mall New Market | Lindsay St, Taltala, Kolkata | 2010 | 110,000 sq ft (10,000 m^{2}) | |
| Gariahat Mall | Gariahat, Ballygunge, Kolkata | 2005 | 103,000 sq ft (9,600 m^{2}) | |
| Dreamplex Mall | City Center, Durgapur | 2005 | 100,000 sq ft (9,300 m^{2}) | |
| RD Mall | Liluah, Howrah | 2011 | 100,000 sq ft (9,300 m^{2}) | |
| Central Mall, New Town | Action Area-1, New Town, Kolkata | 2017 | 100,000 sq ft (9,300 m^{2}) | |
| E Mall, Kolkata | Chandni Chowk, Dharmatala, Kolkata | | 80,000 sq ft (7,400 m^{2}) | |
| Silver Arcade | Mathpukur, EM Bypass, Kolkata | | 80,000 sq ft (7,400 m^{2}) | |
| Homeland Mall | Ashutosh Mukherjee Road, Kolkata | | 8,000 sq ft (740 m^{2}) | |
| Metro Central Mall | New Market, Dharmatala, Kolkata | 2019 | 50,000 sq ft (4,600 m^{2}) | |

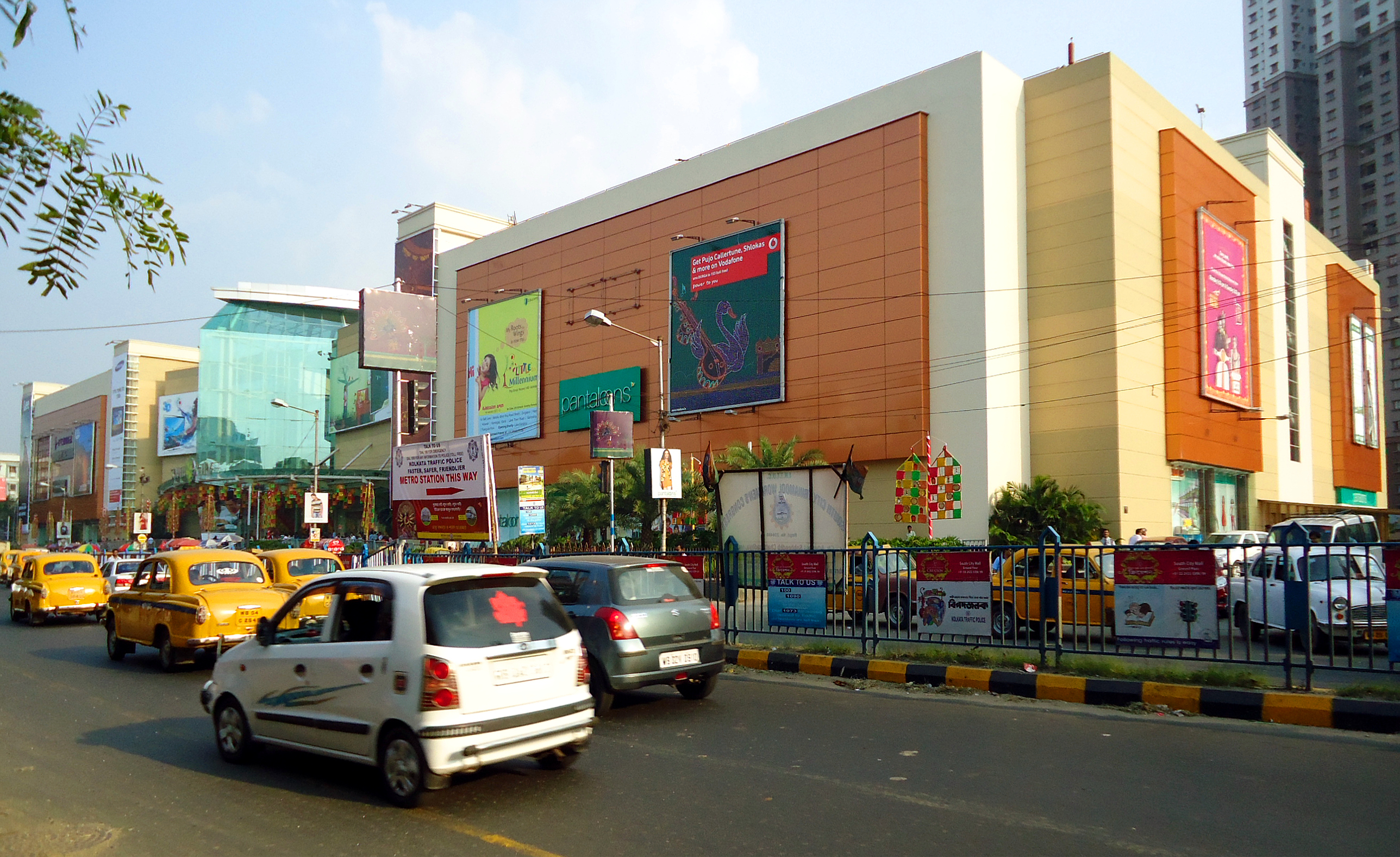
South City Mall is the largest shopping mall in East India

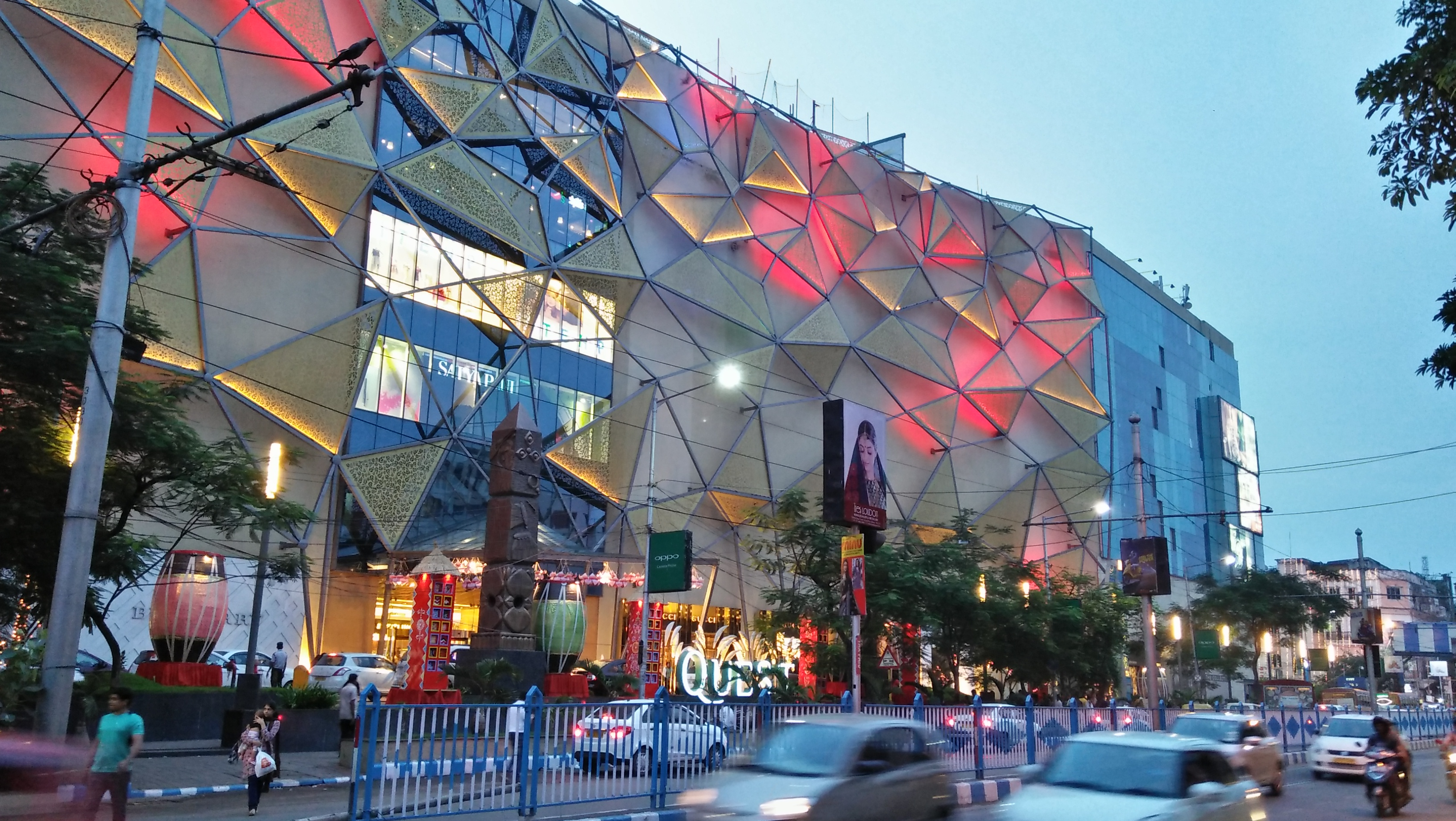
Quest Mall is one of the largest malls of Kolkata

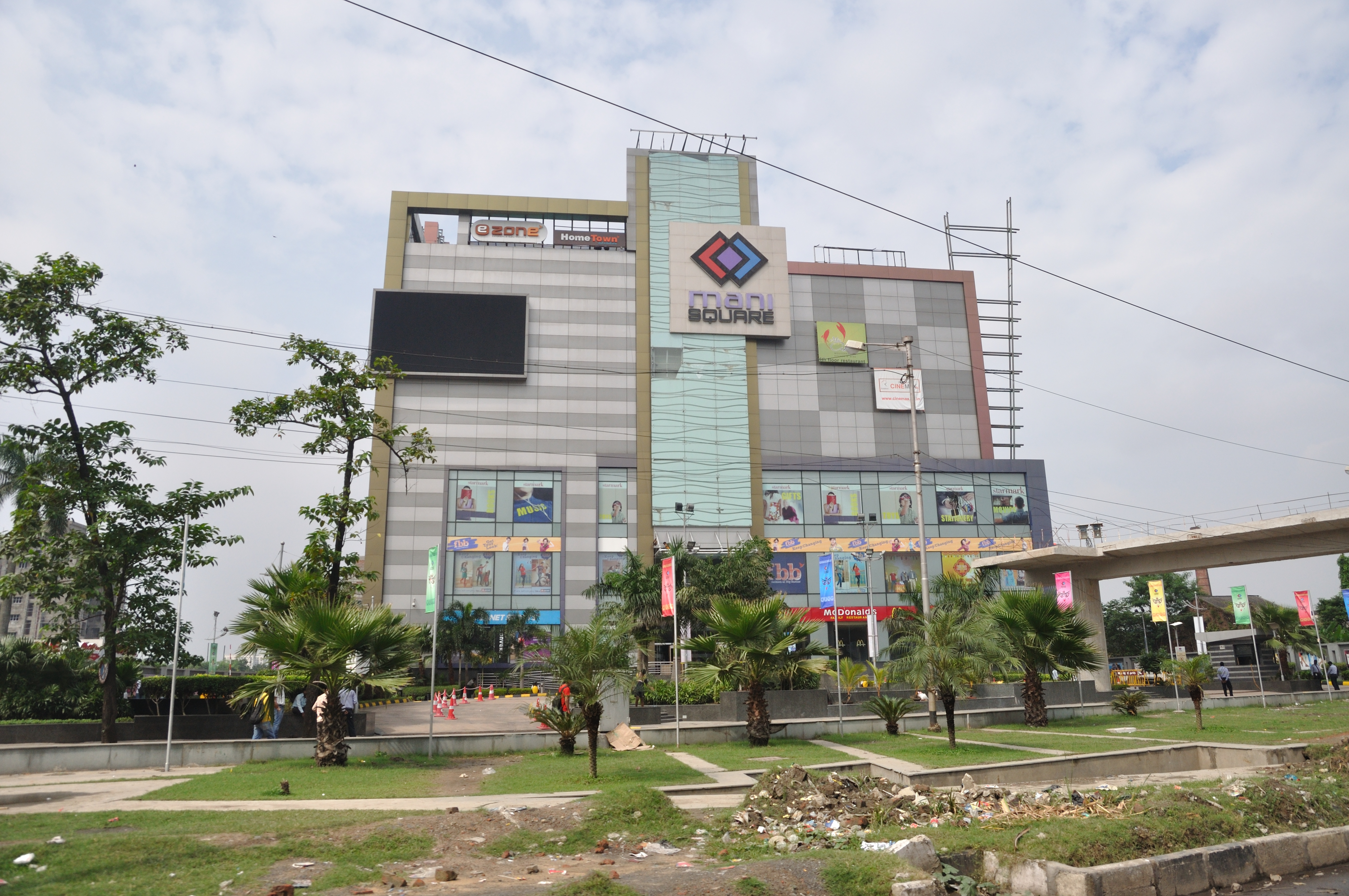
Mani Square is situated on Eastern Metropolitan Bypass, Kolkata

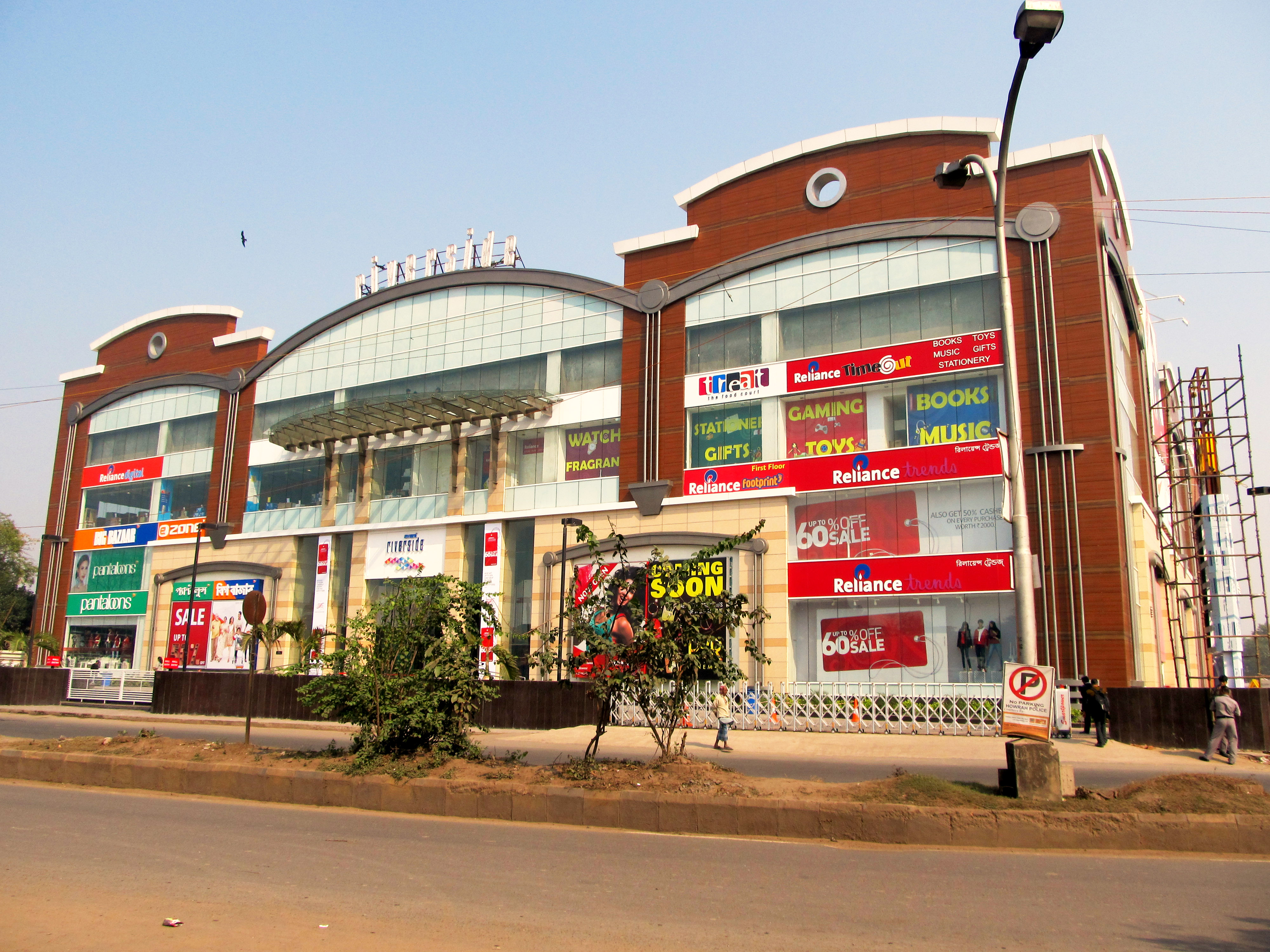
Avani Riverside Mall is the largest mall in Howrah

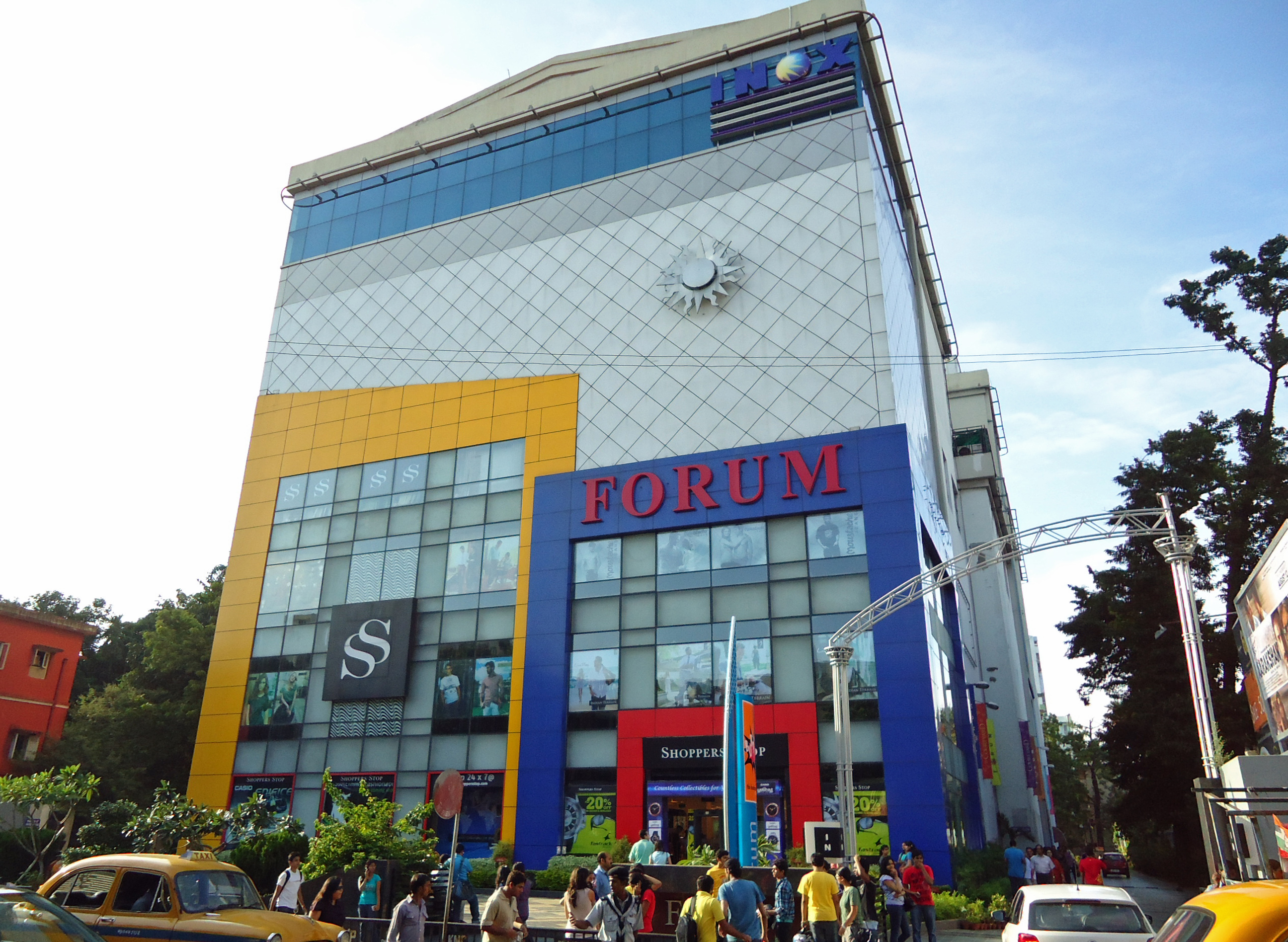
Forum Mall was the first conventional mall-cum-multiplex to have been built in Kolkata
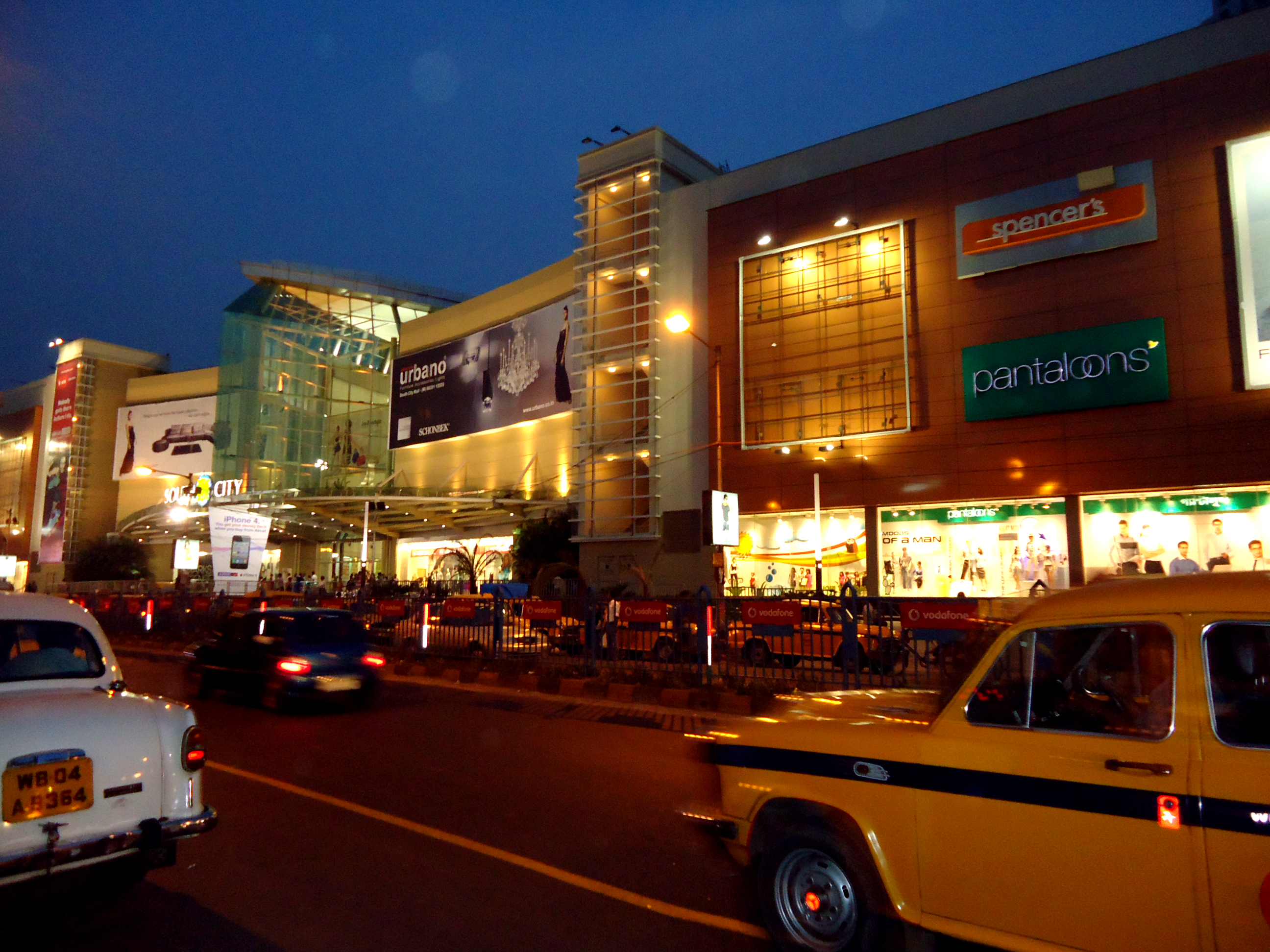
South City Mall at night

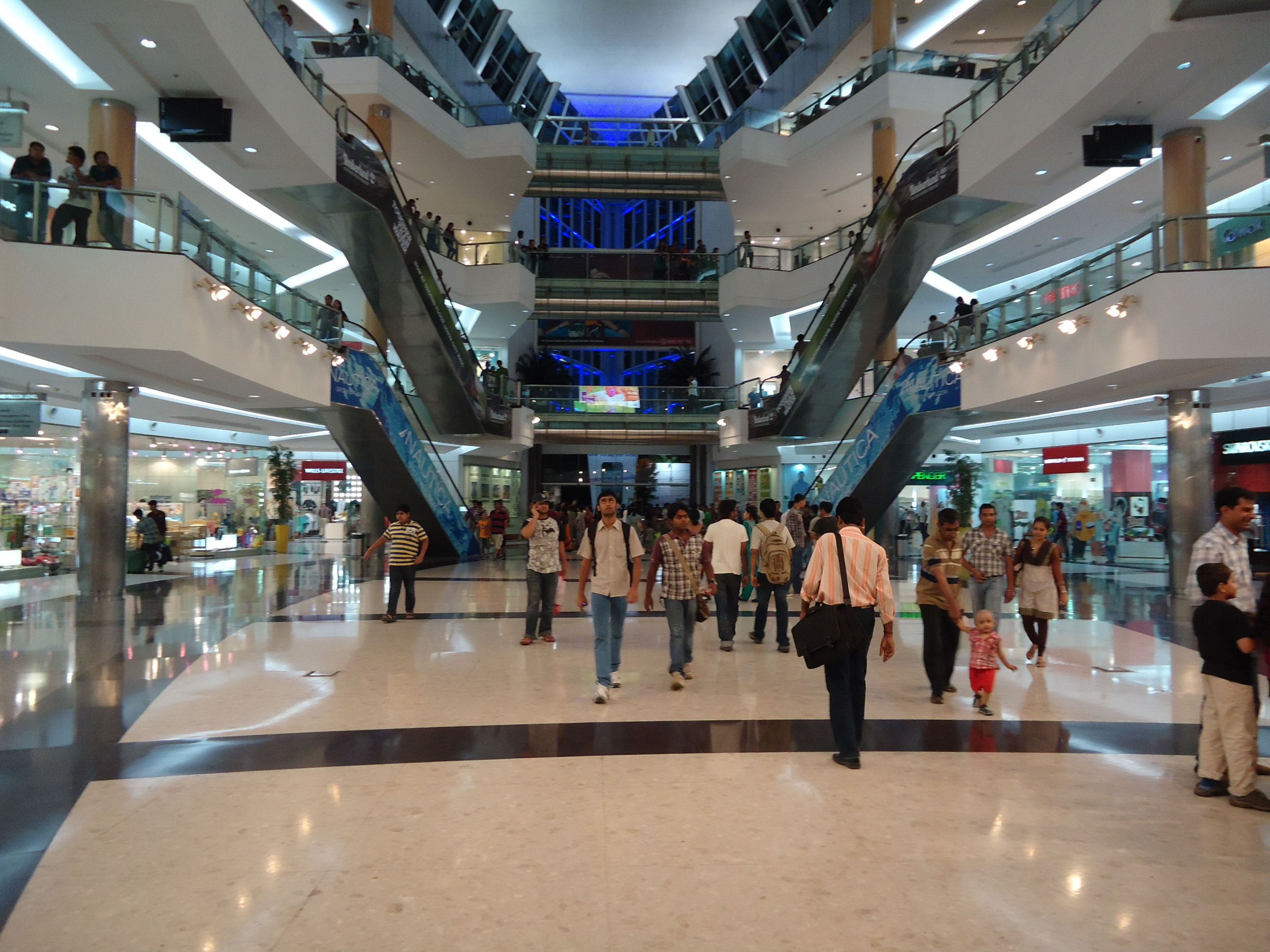
South City Mall atrium view

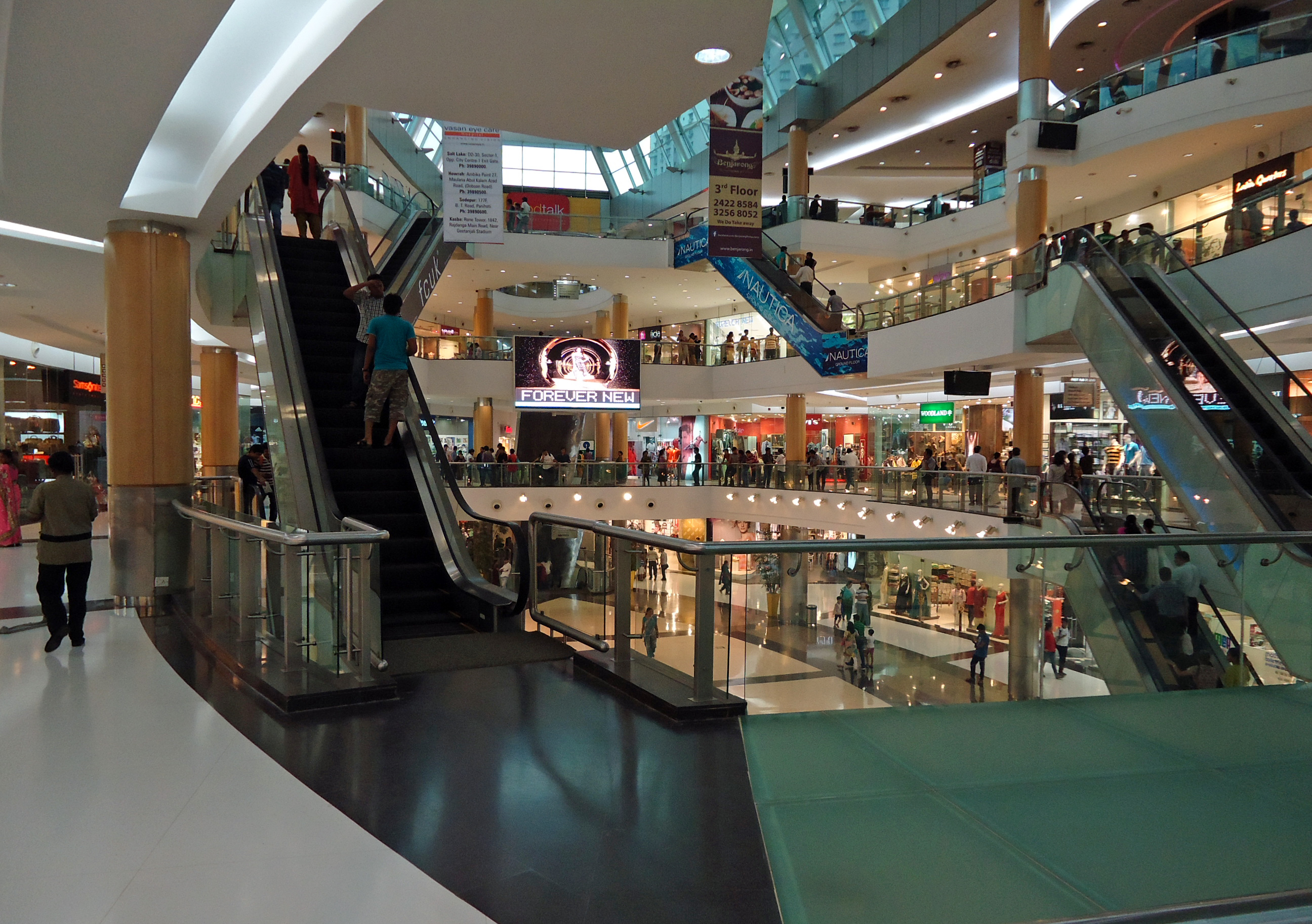
South City Mall interior view

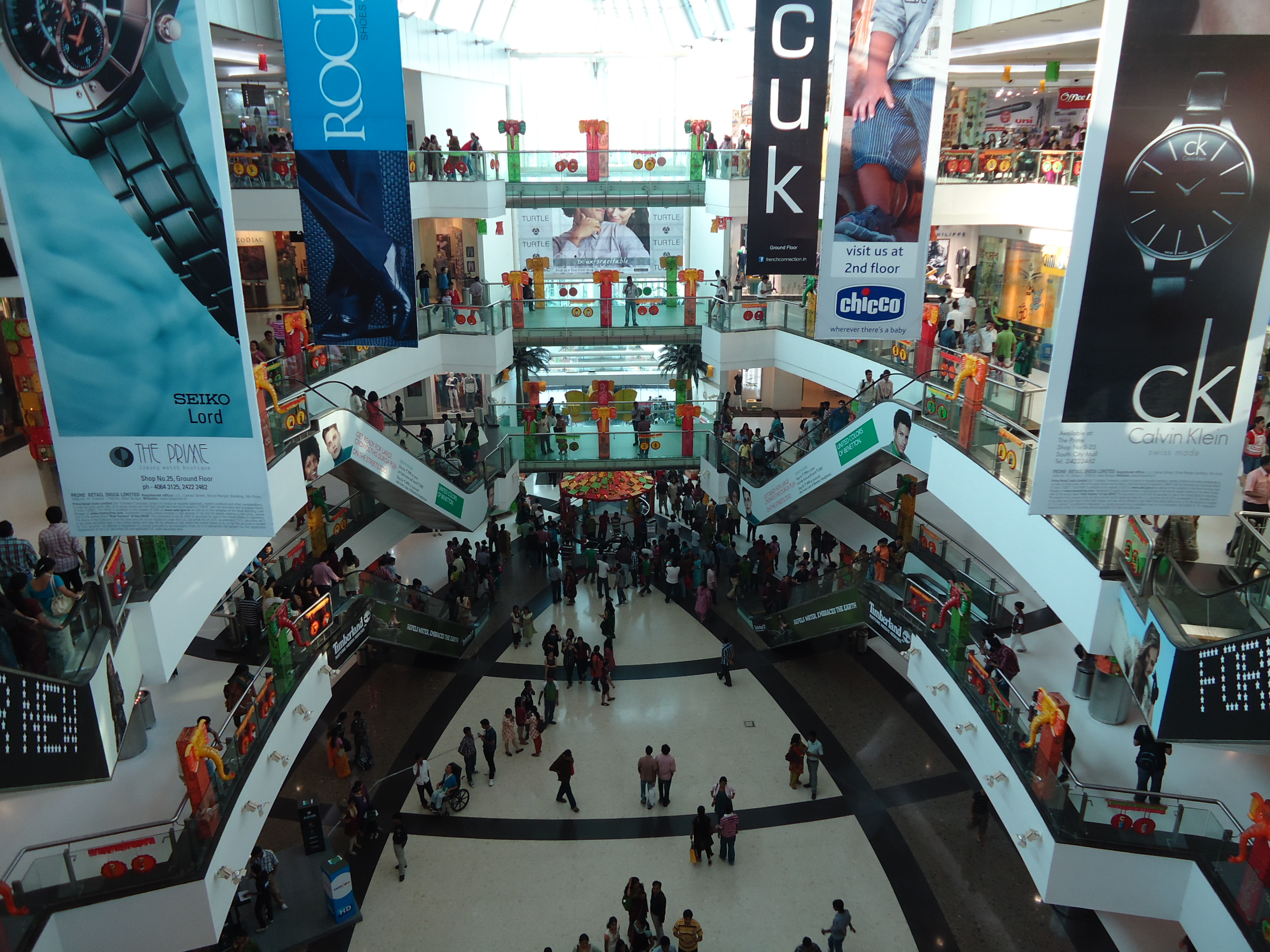
South City Mall inside view

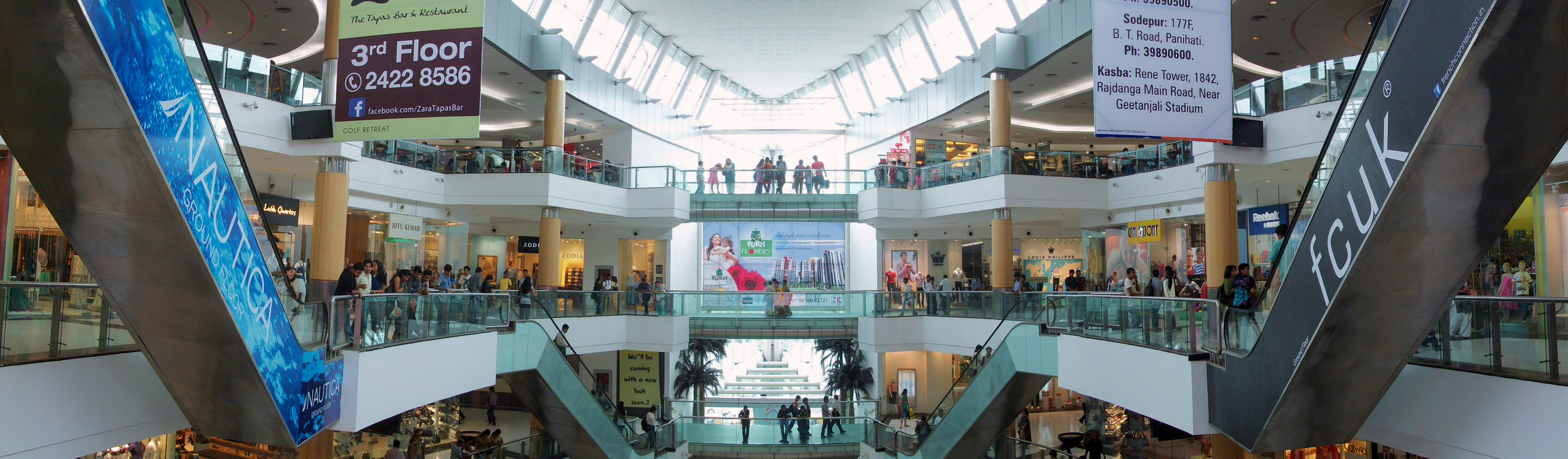
South City Mall Panorama

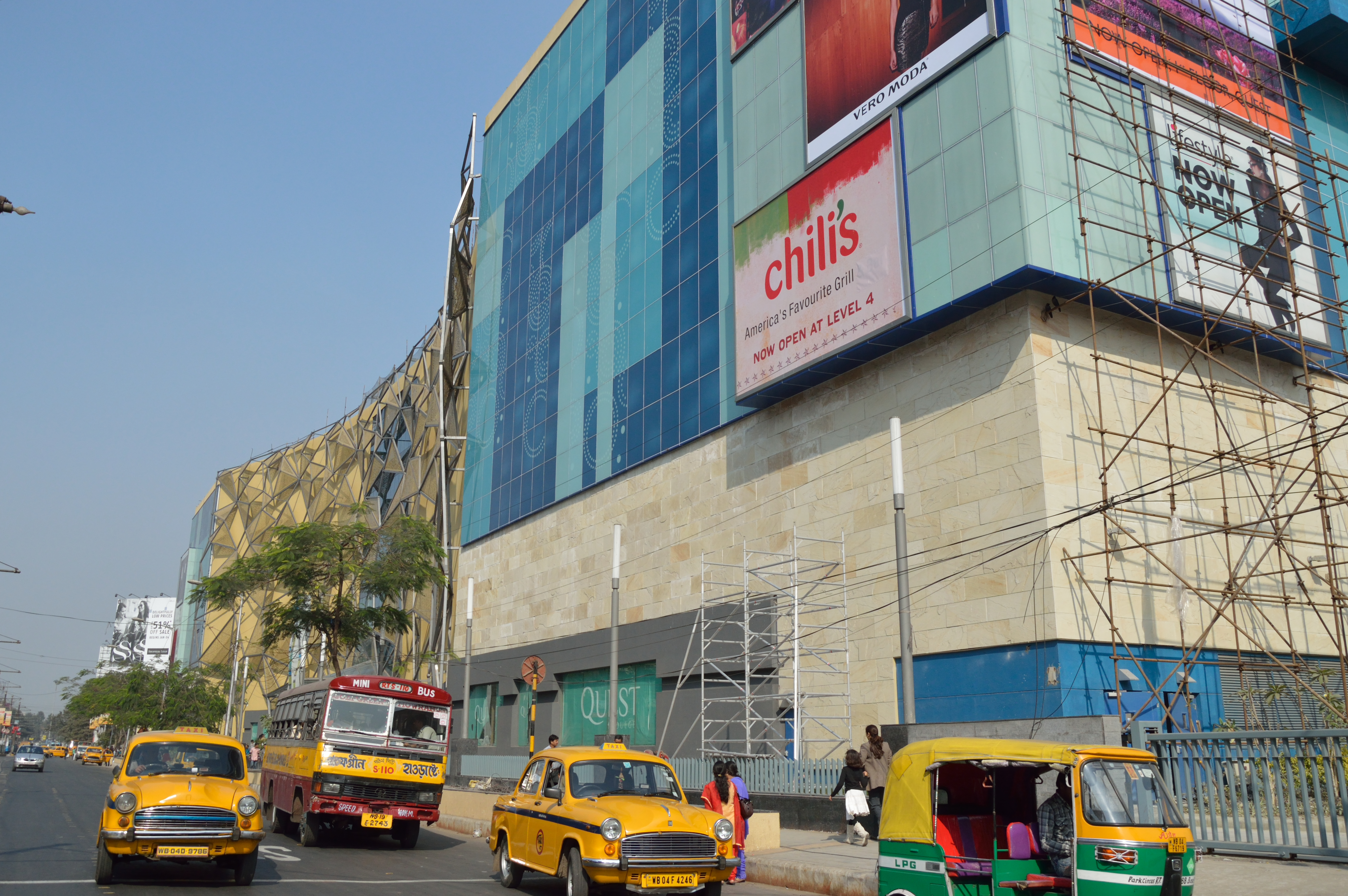
Quest Mall outside view

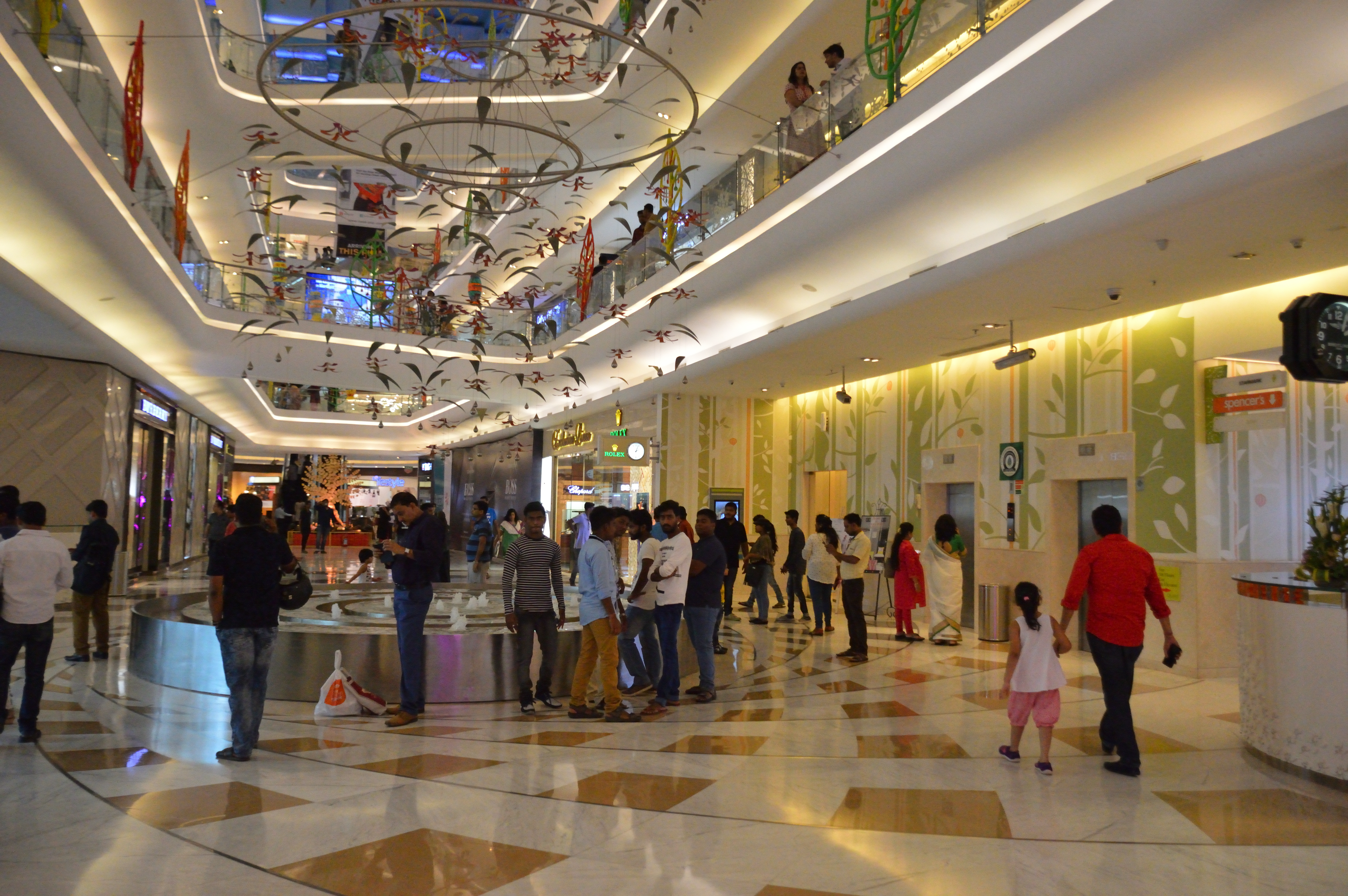
Quest Mall inside view

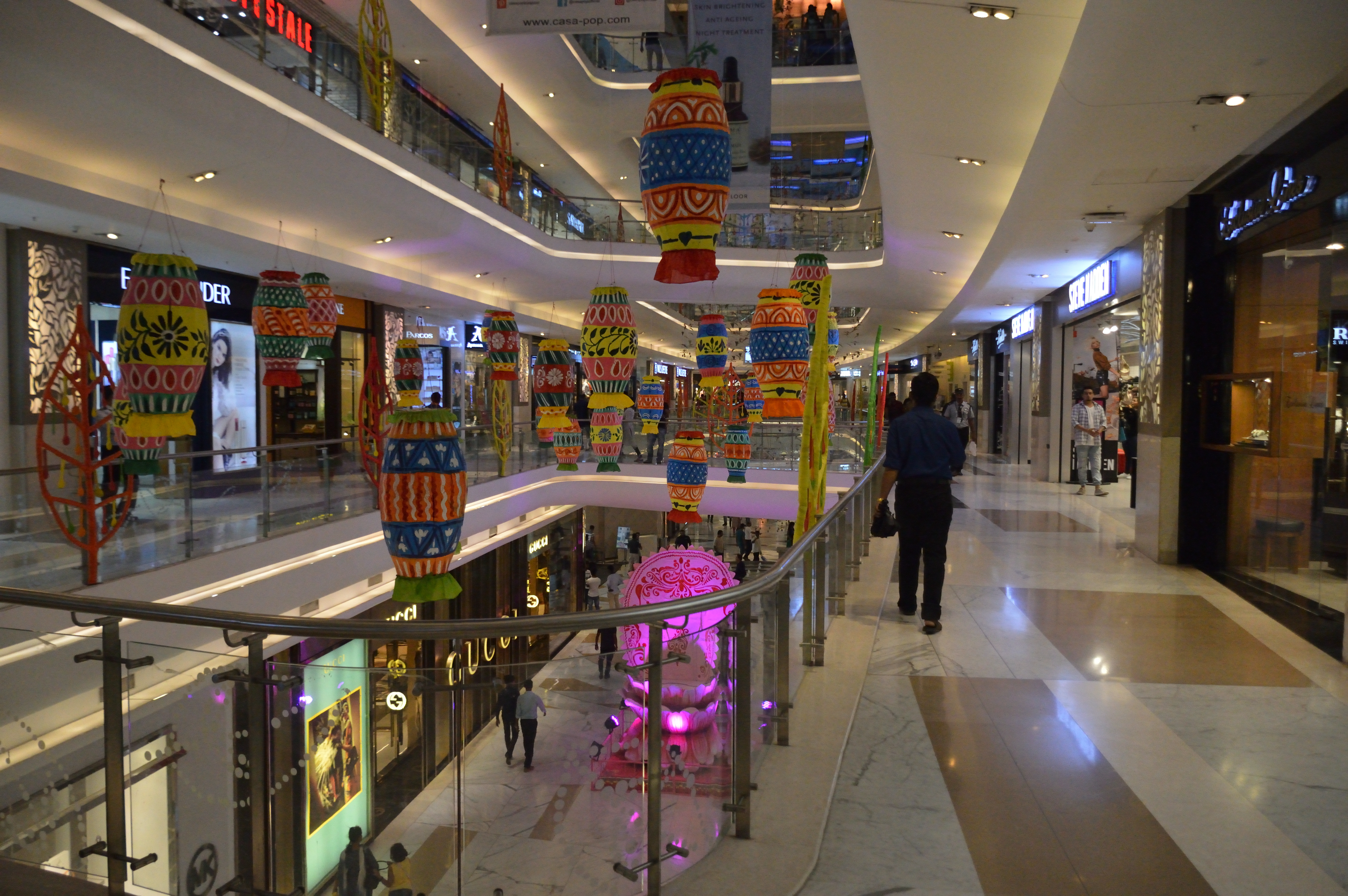
Quest Mall internal view

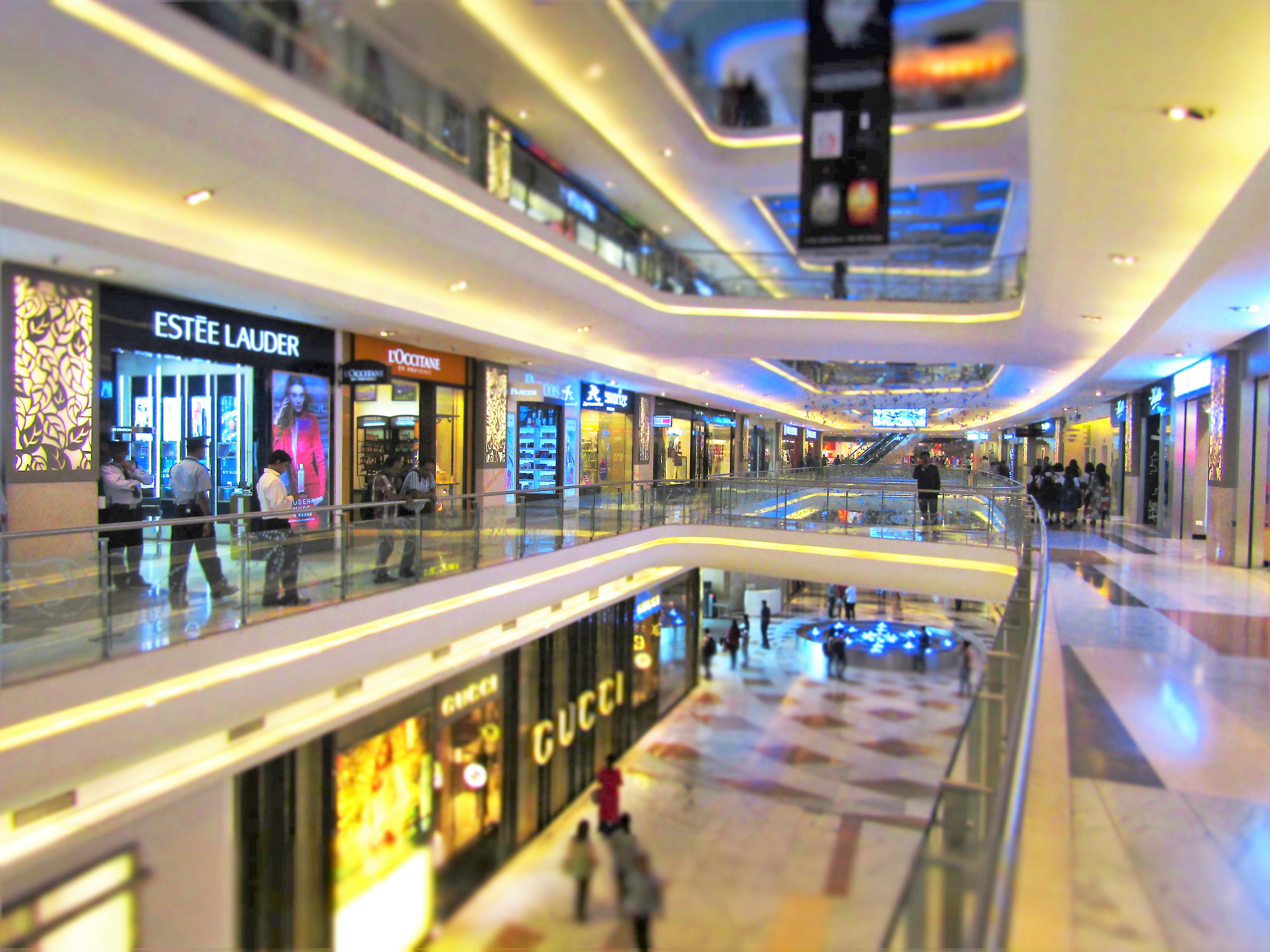
Quest Mall interior view

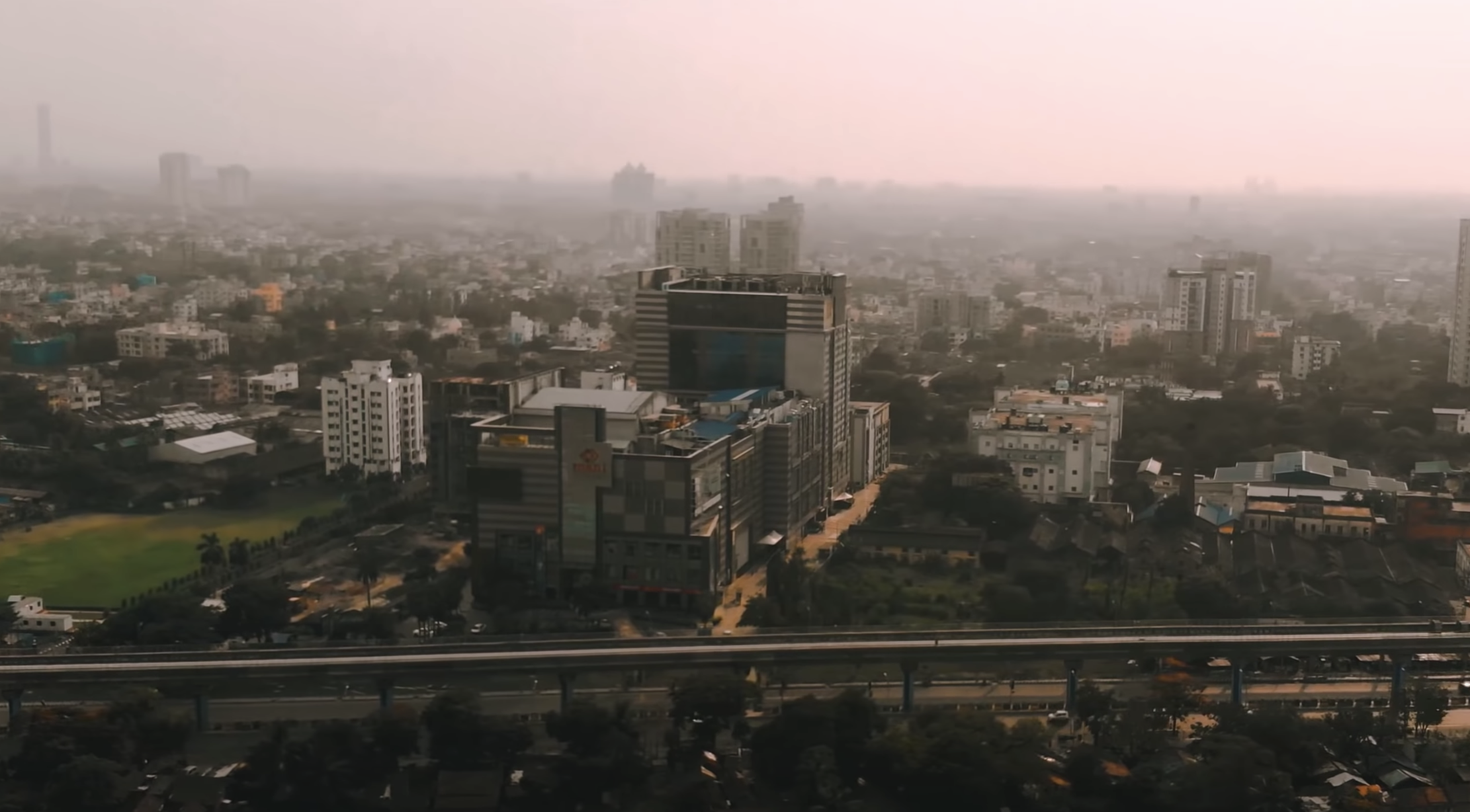
Mani Square aerial view

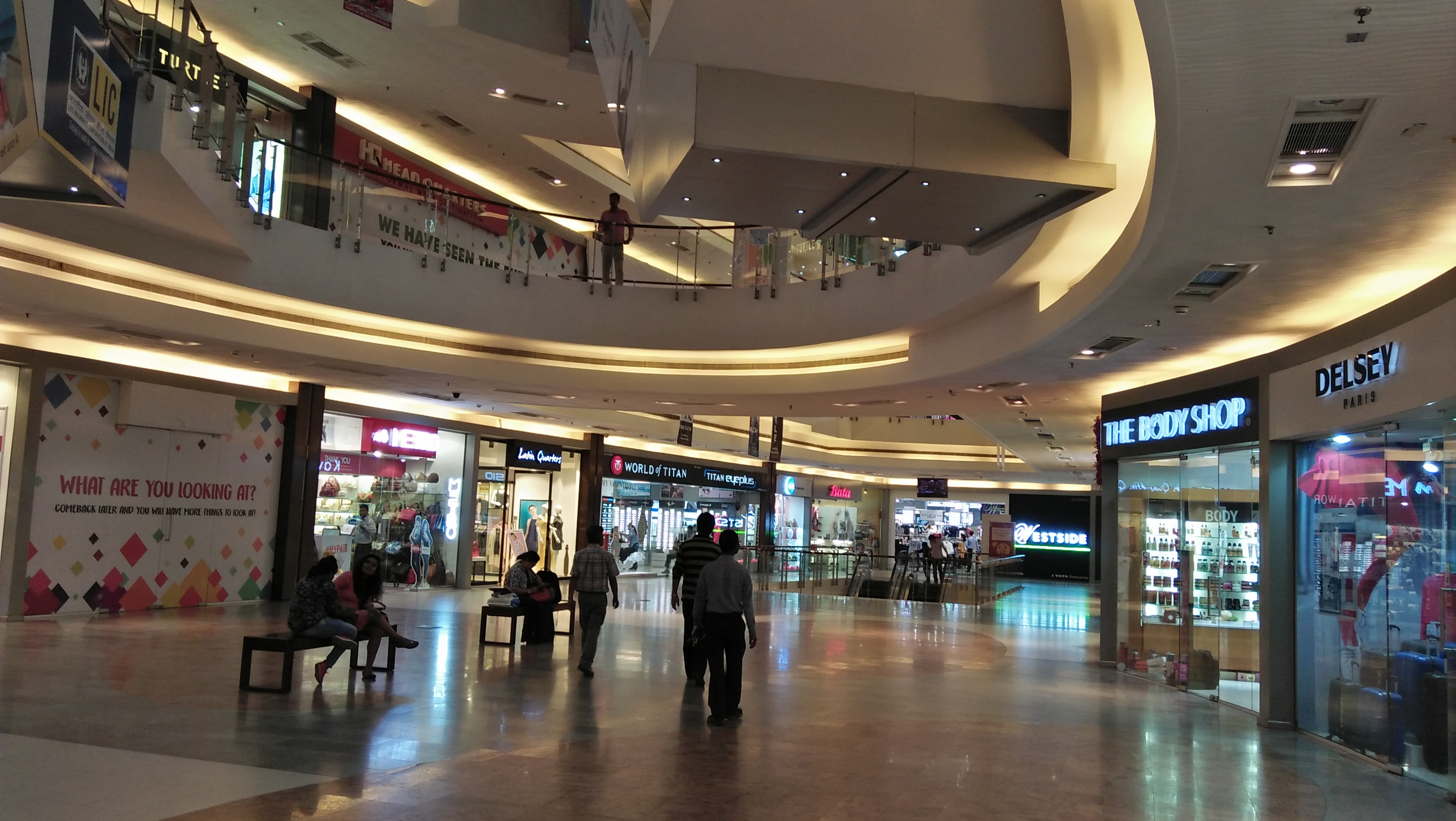
Mani Square inside view

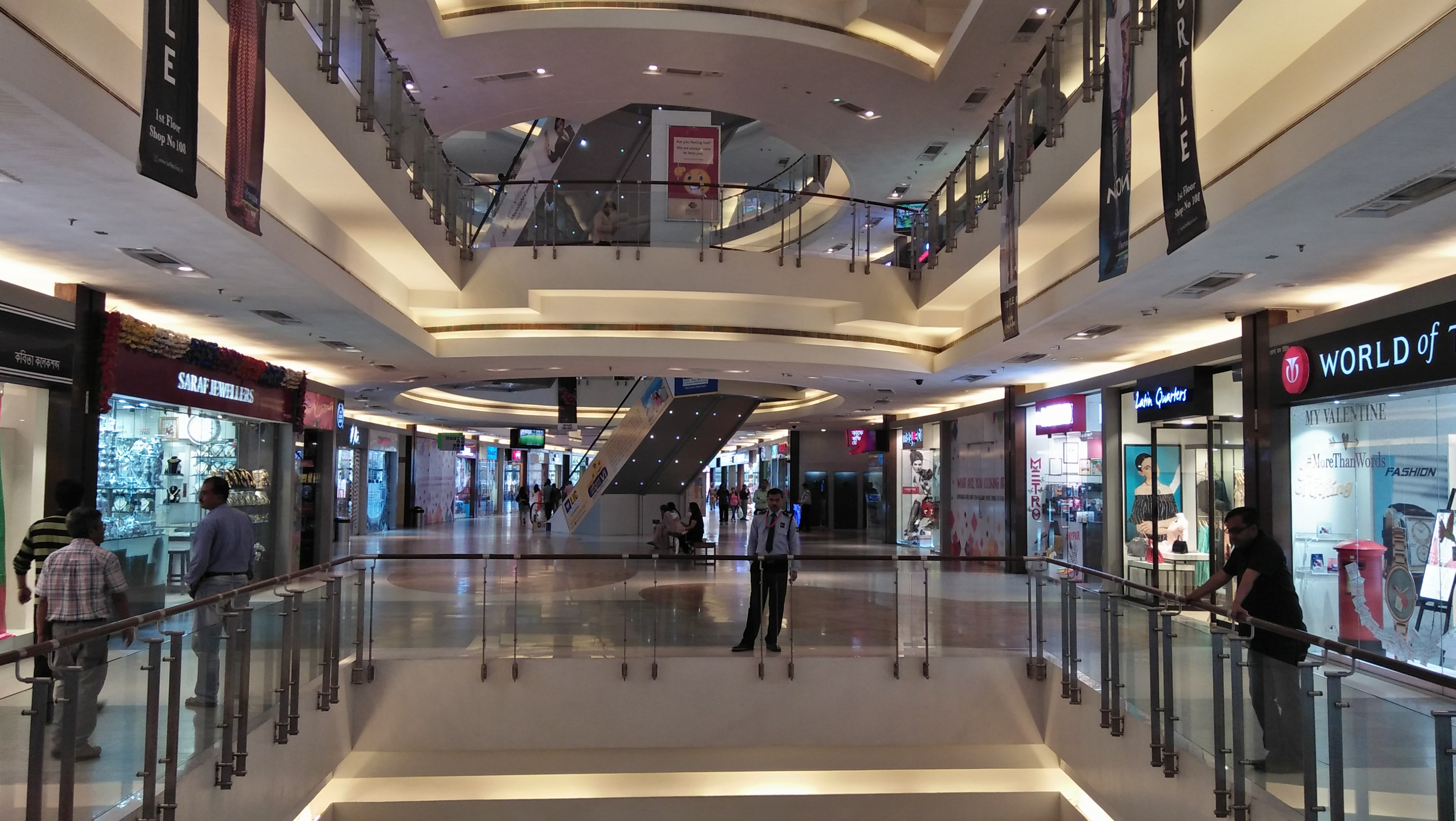
Mani Square interior view

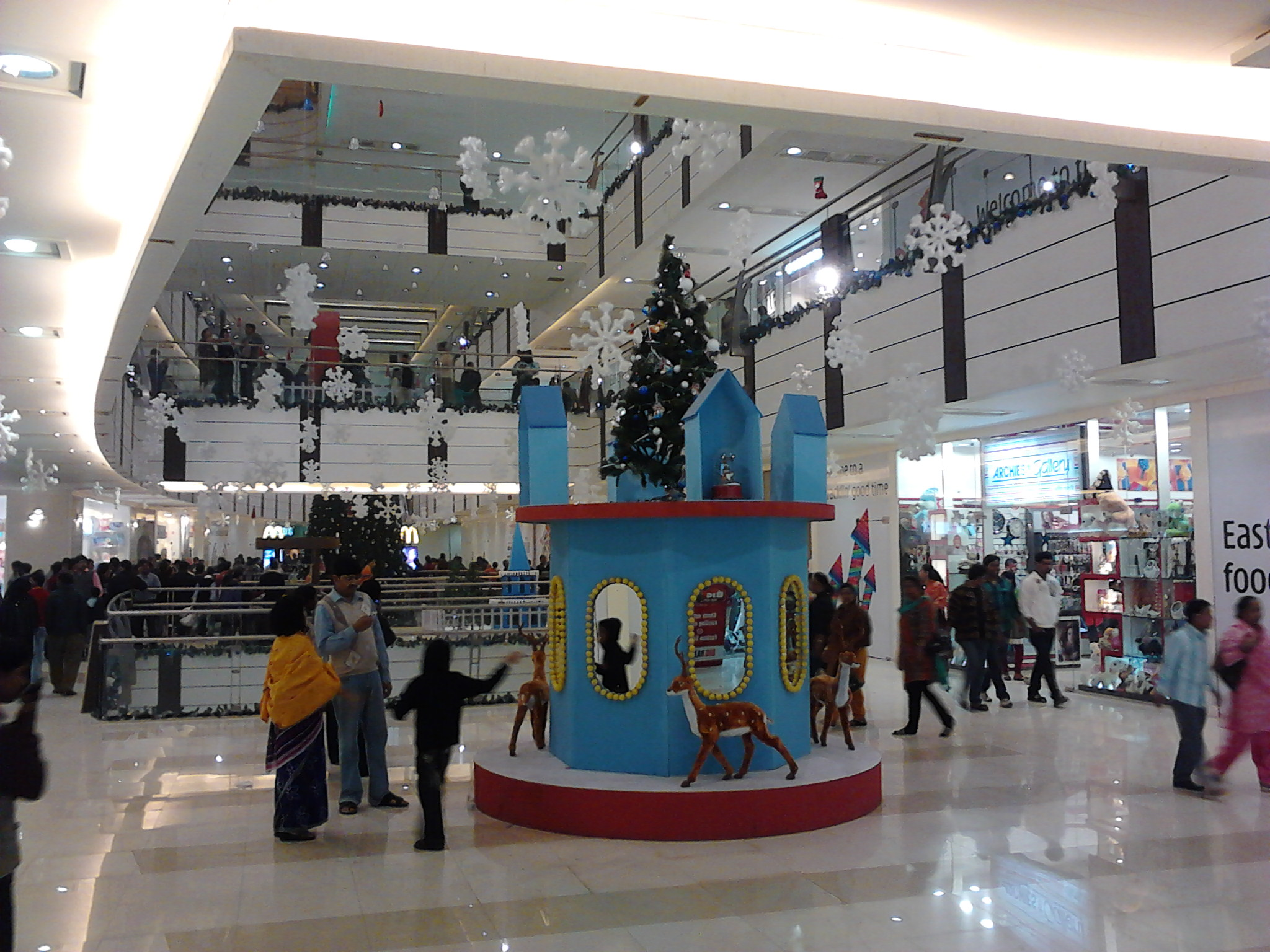
Avani Mall inside view

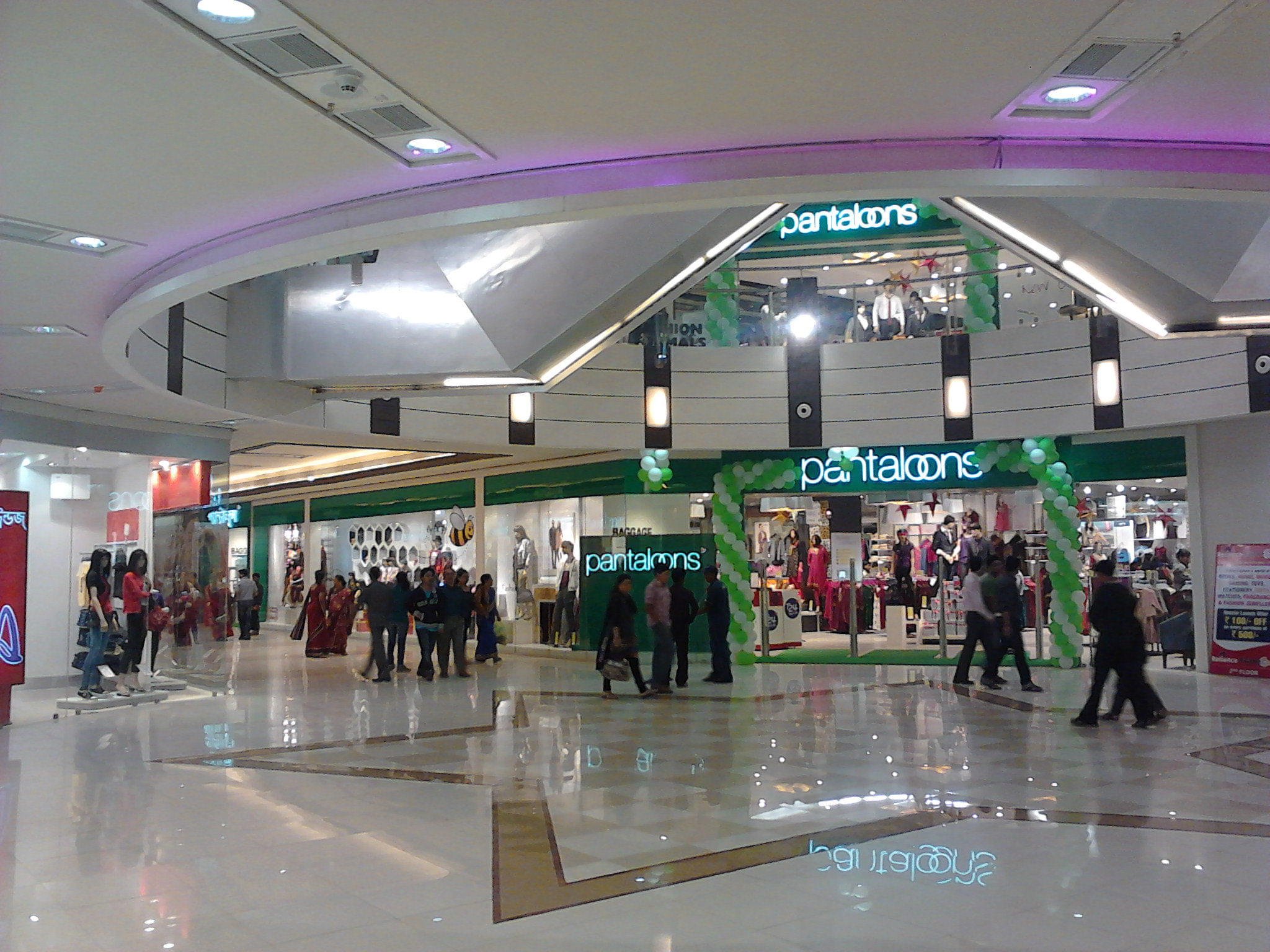
Avani Mall interior view

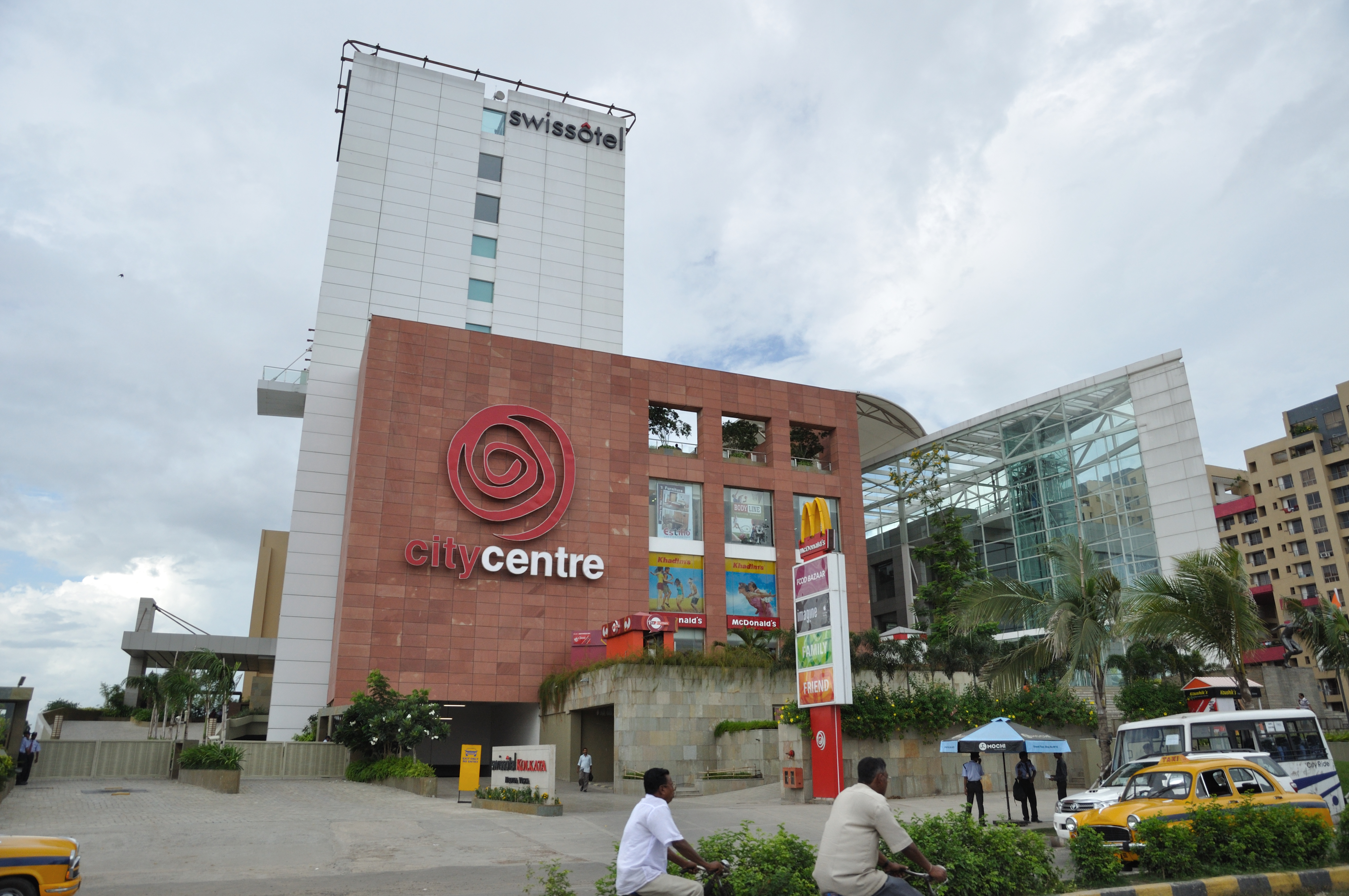
City Centre, New Town (City Centre 2)

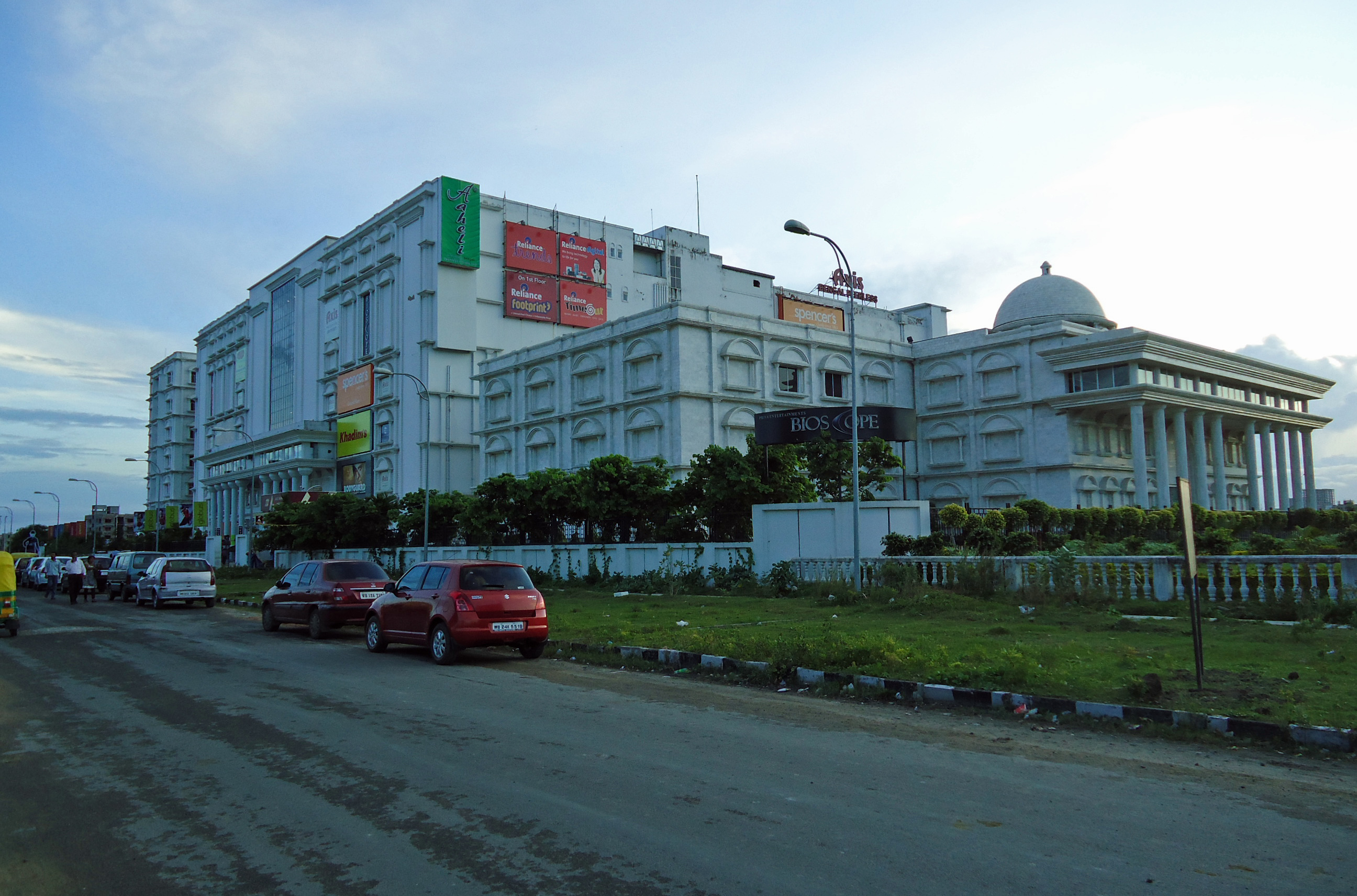
Axis Mall

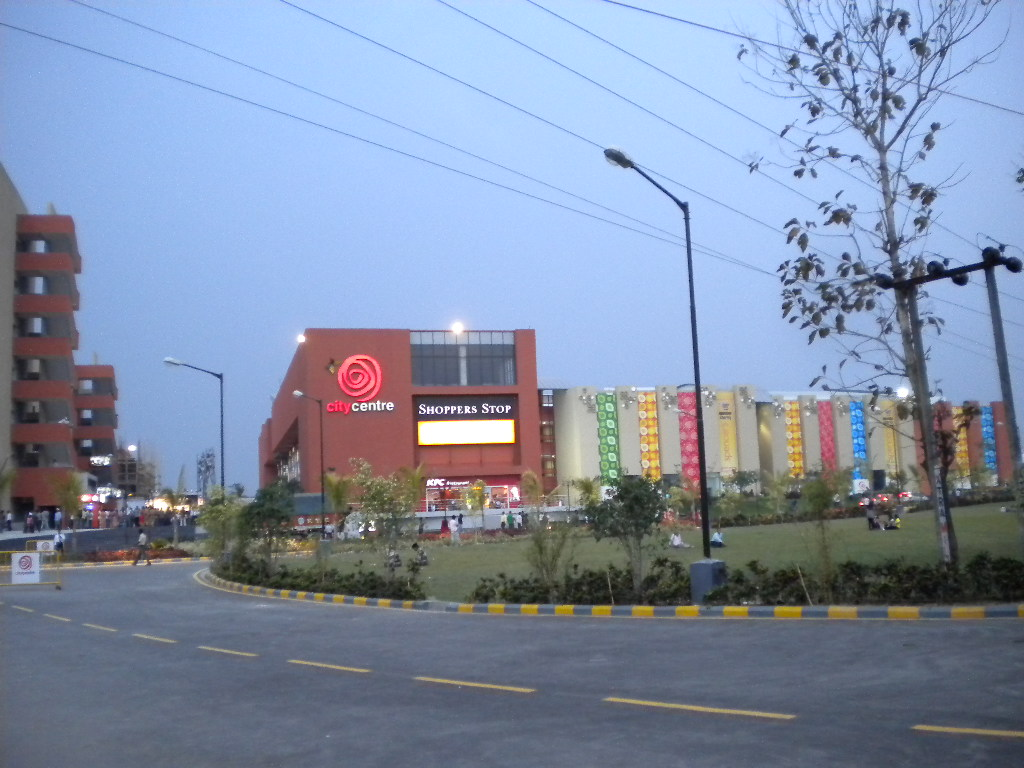
City Centre, Siliguri

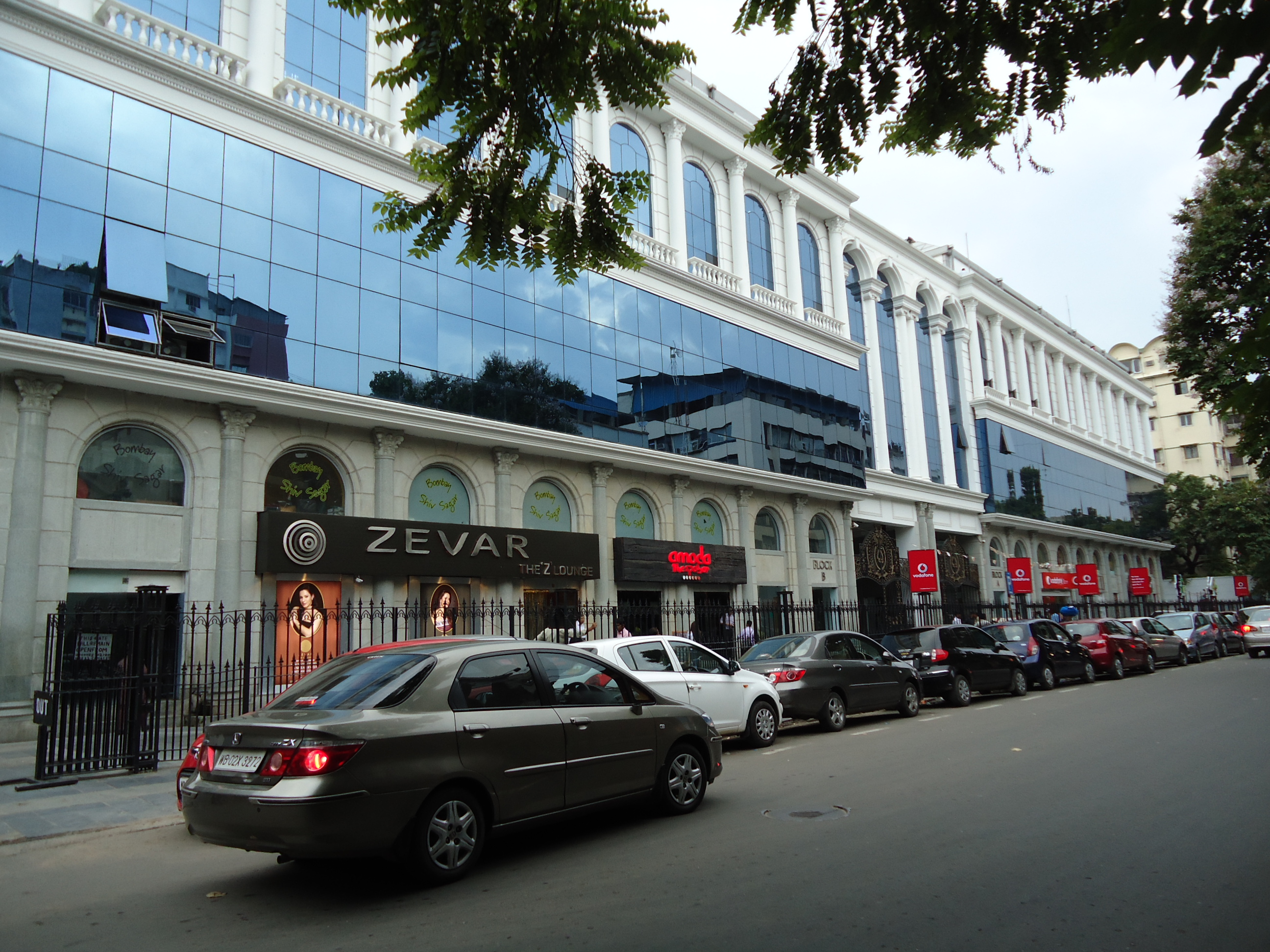
22 Camac Street Mall, Kolkata is an upscale mall in the Marwari-dominated neighborhood of the same name in Kolkata.

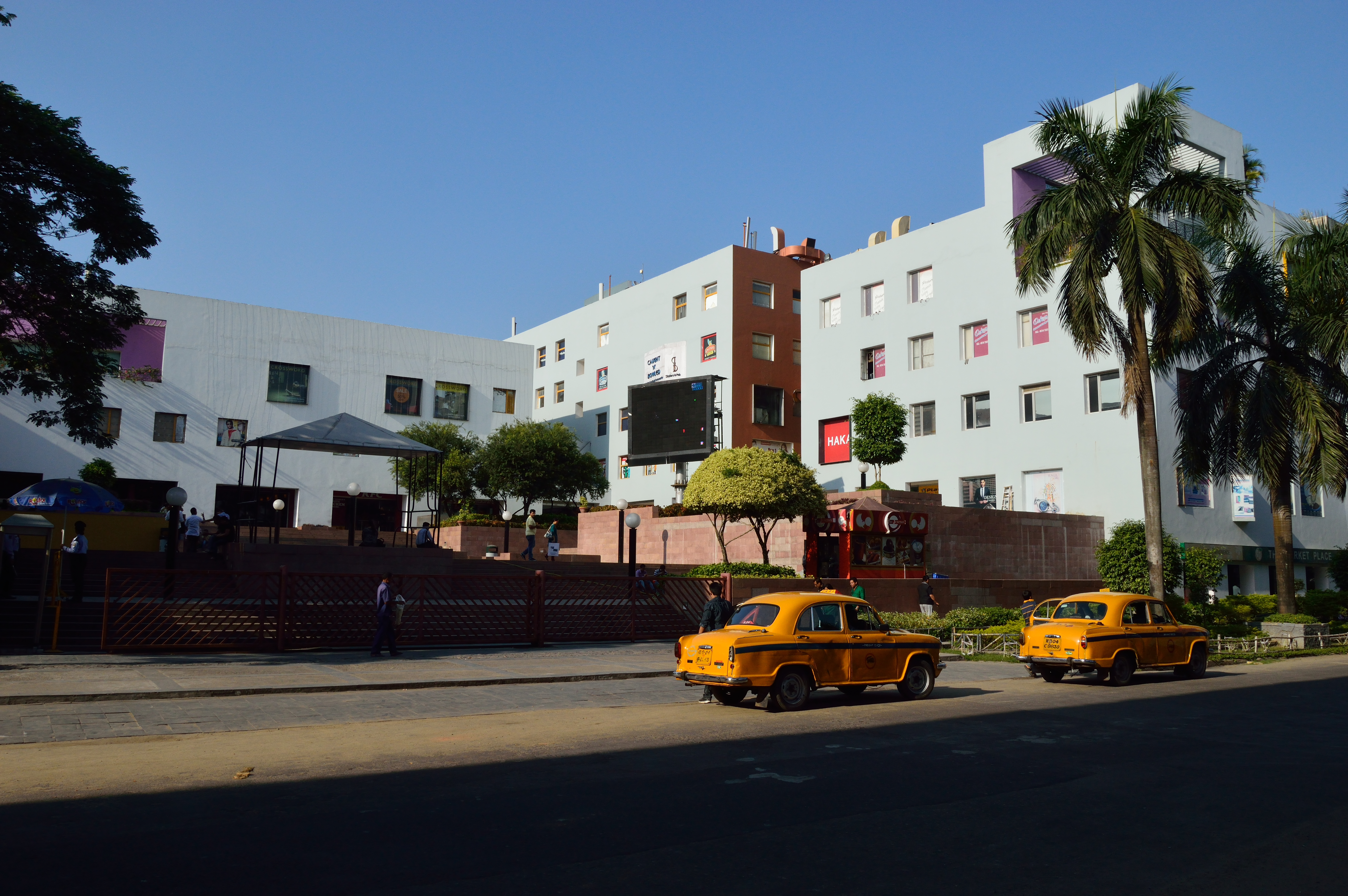
City Centre, Salt Lake

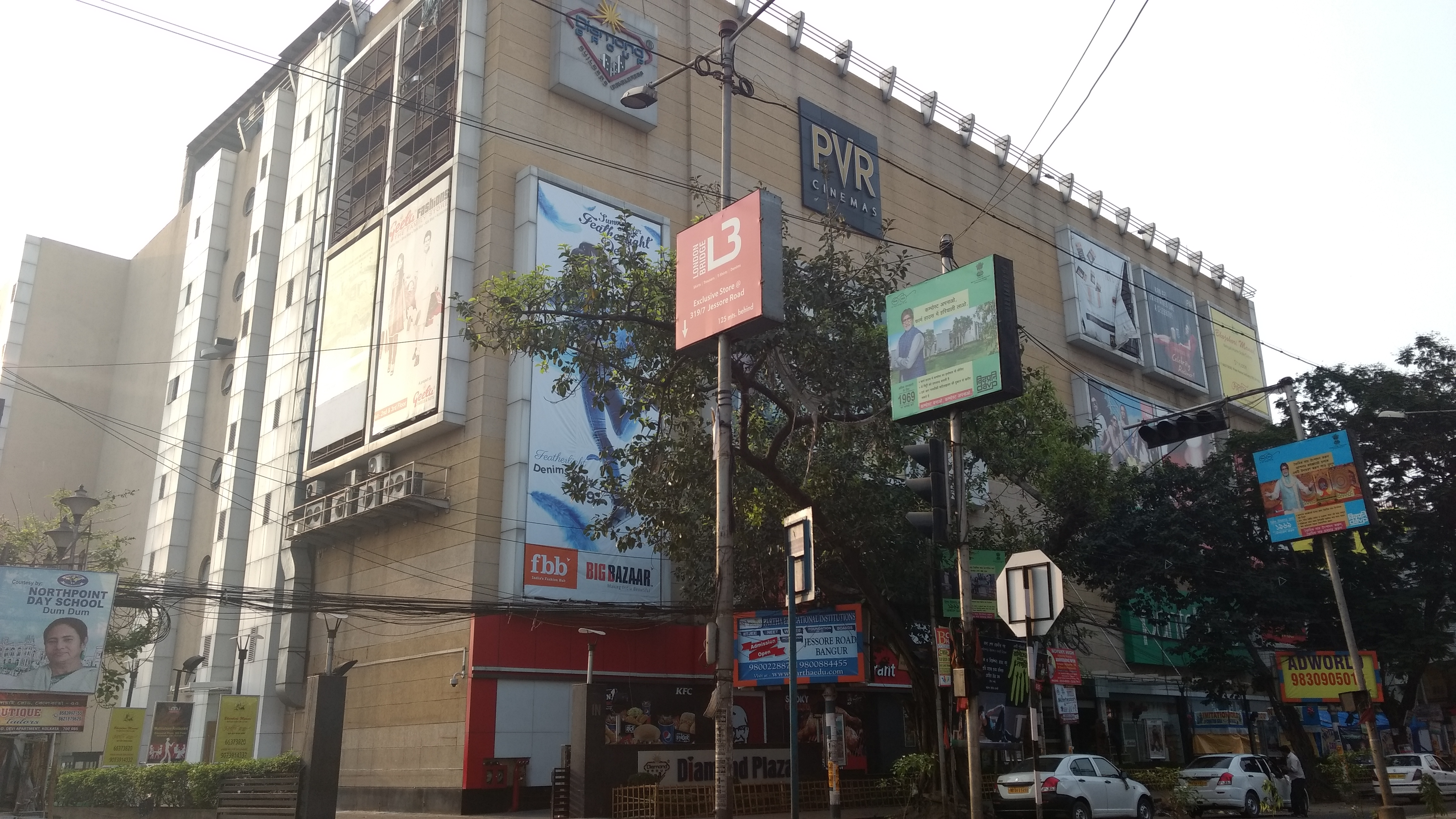
Diamond Plaza, Kolkata

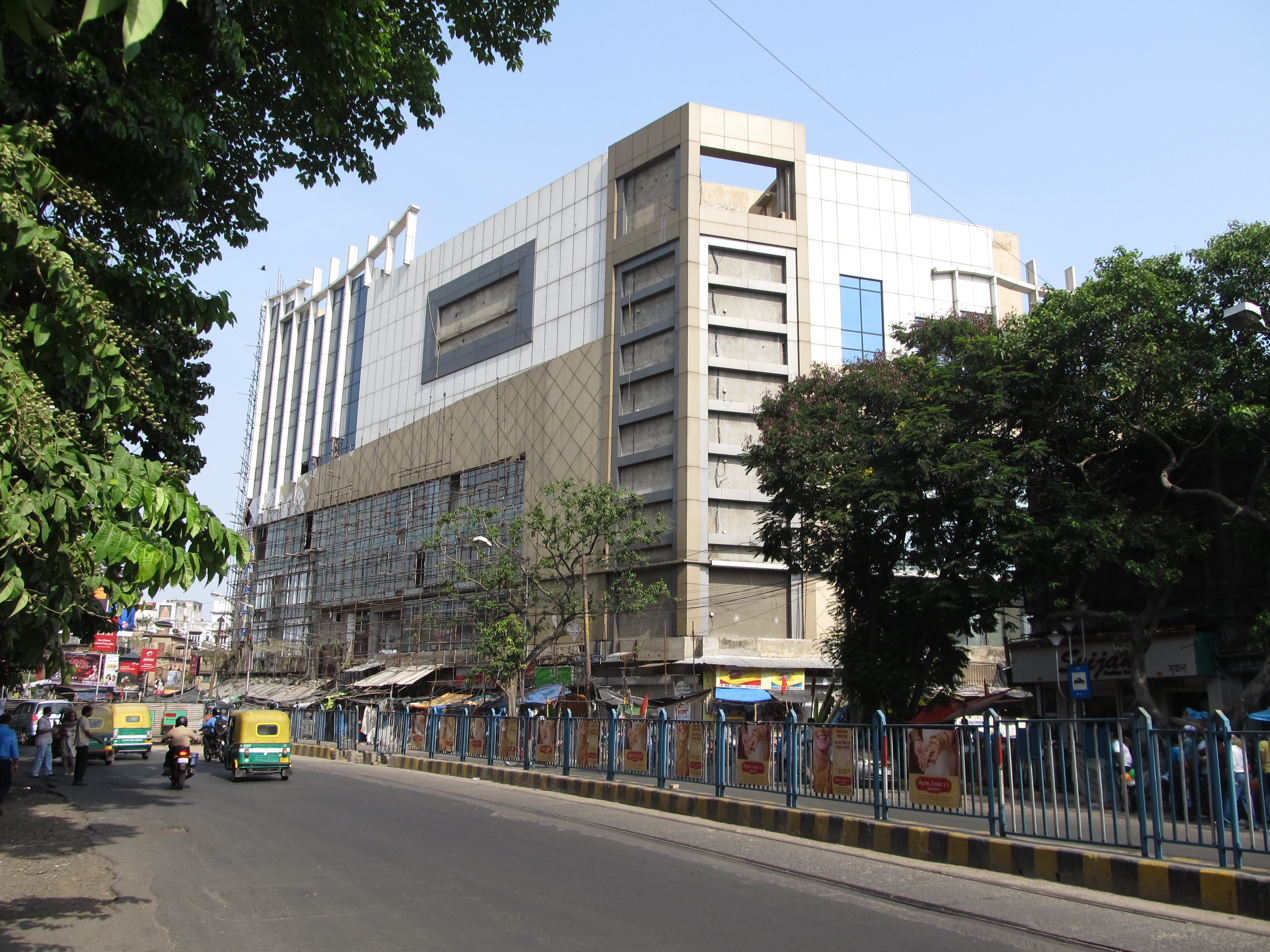
Lake Mall in Rashbehari Avenue is a compact mall in South Kolkata, built on the premises of the century-old Lake Market.

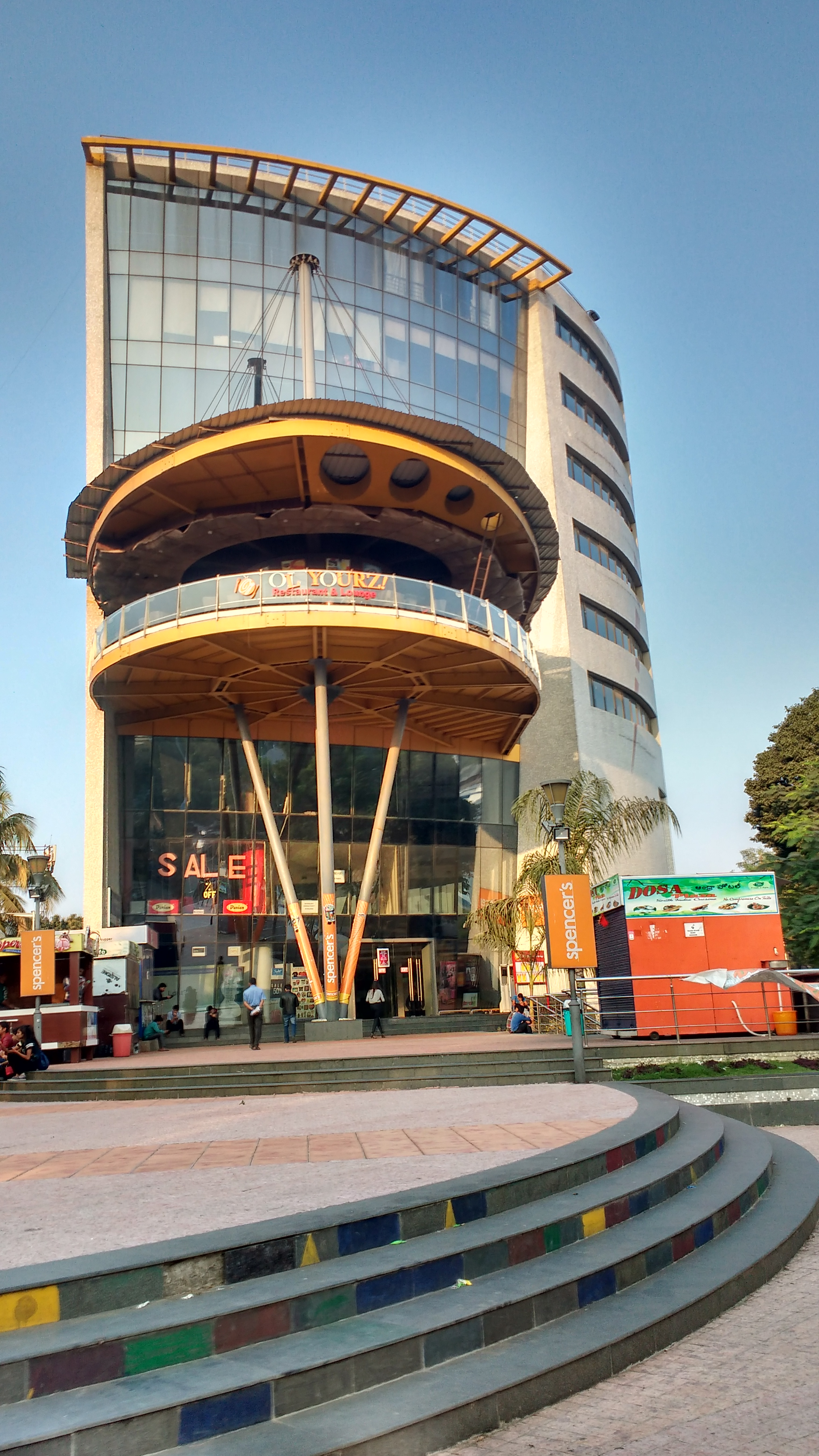
AMP Baishakhi Mall

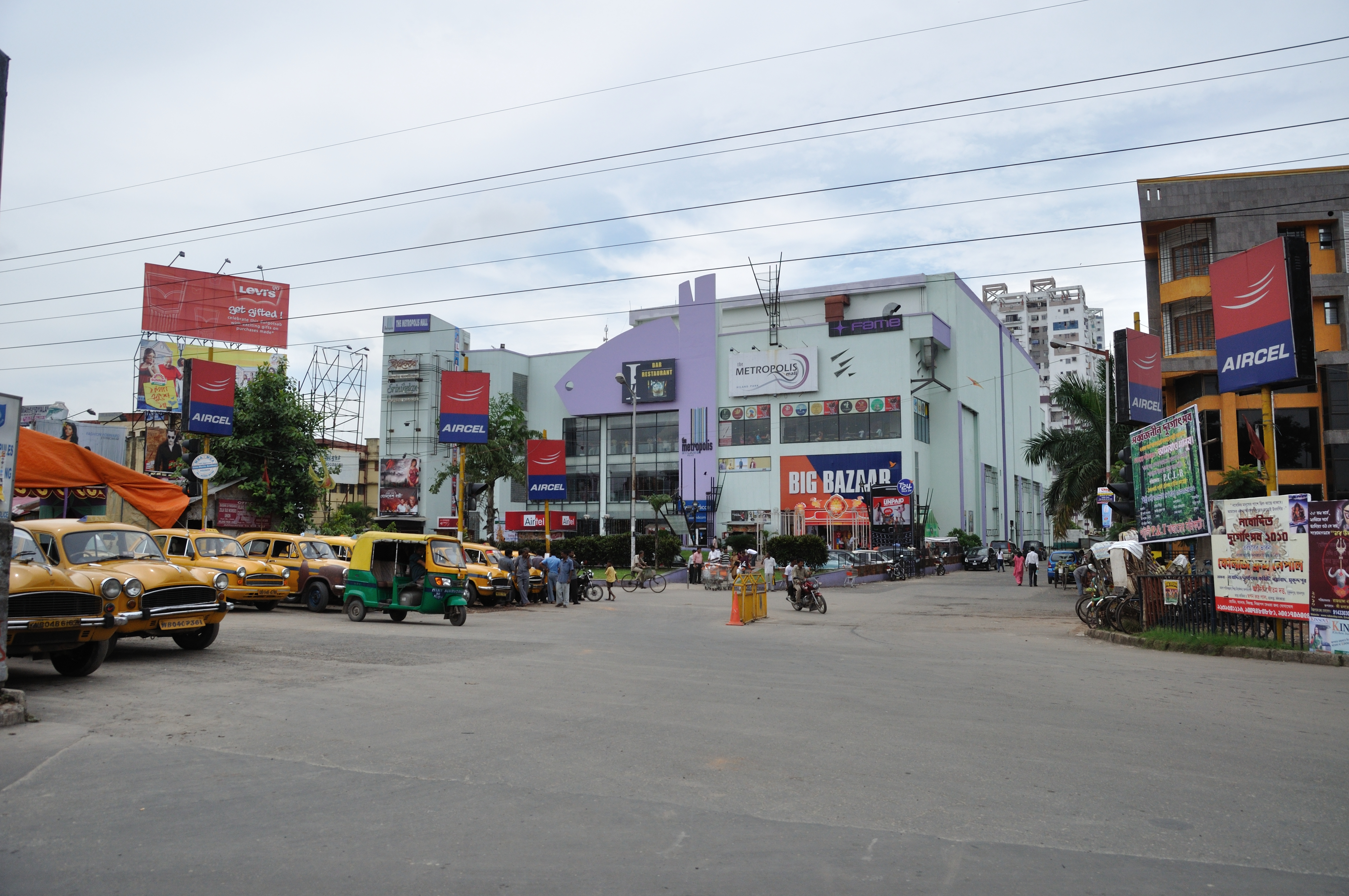
Metropolis Mall, Kolkata

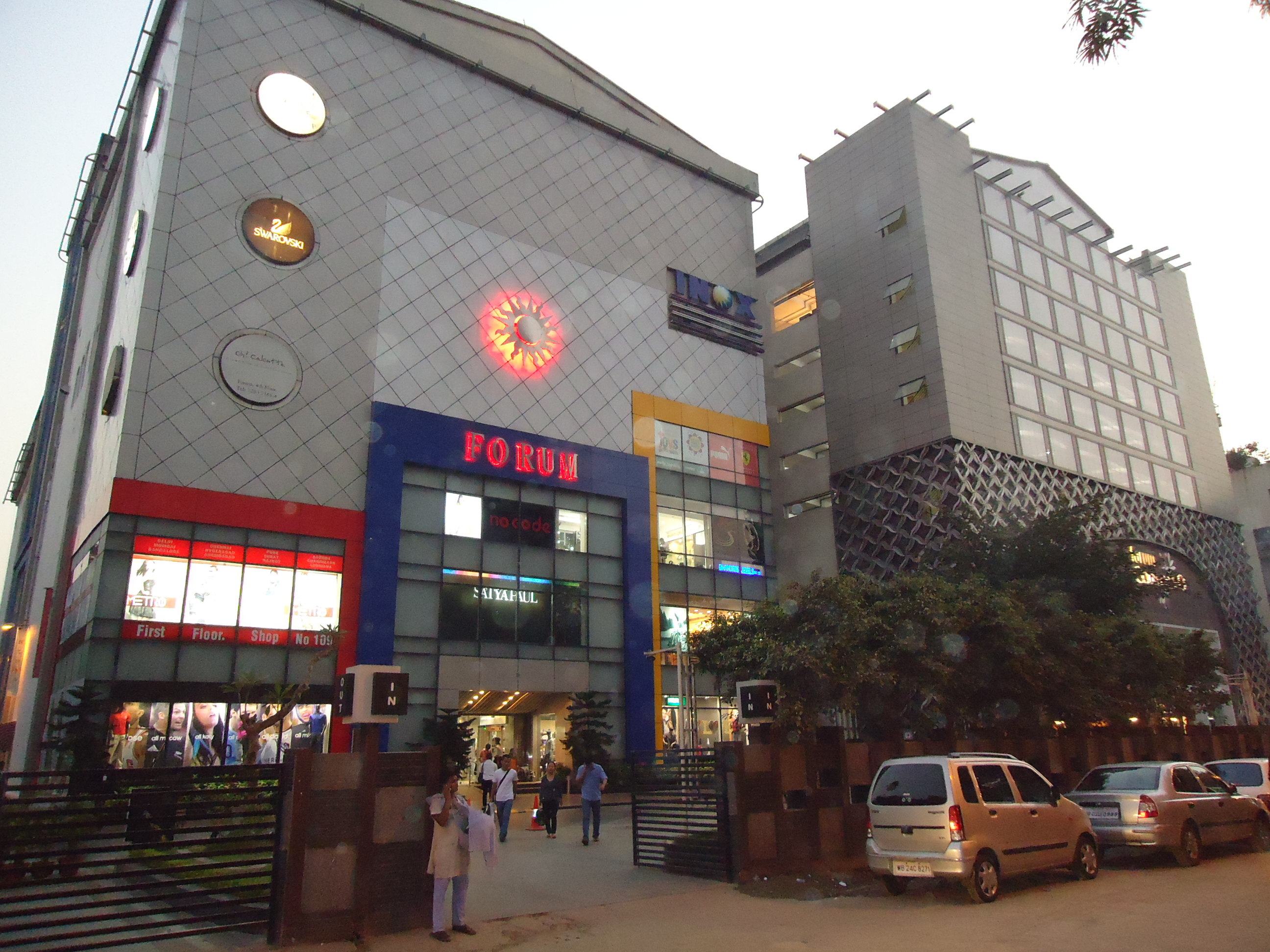
Forum & Forum Courtyard Mall

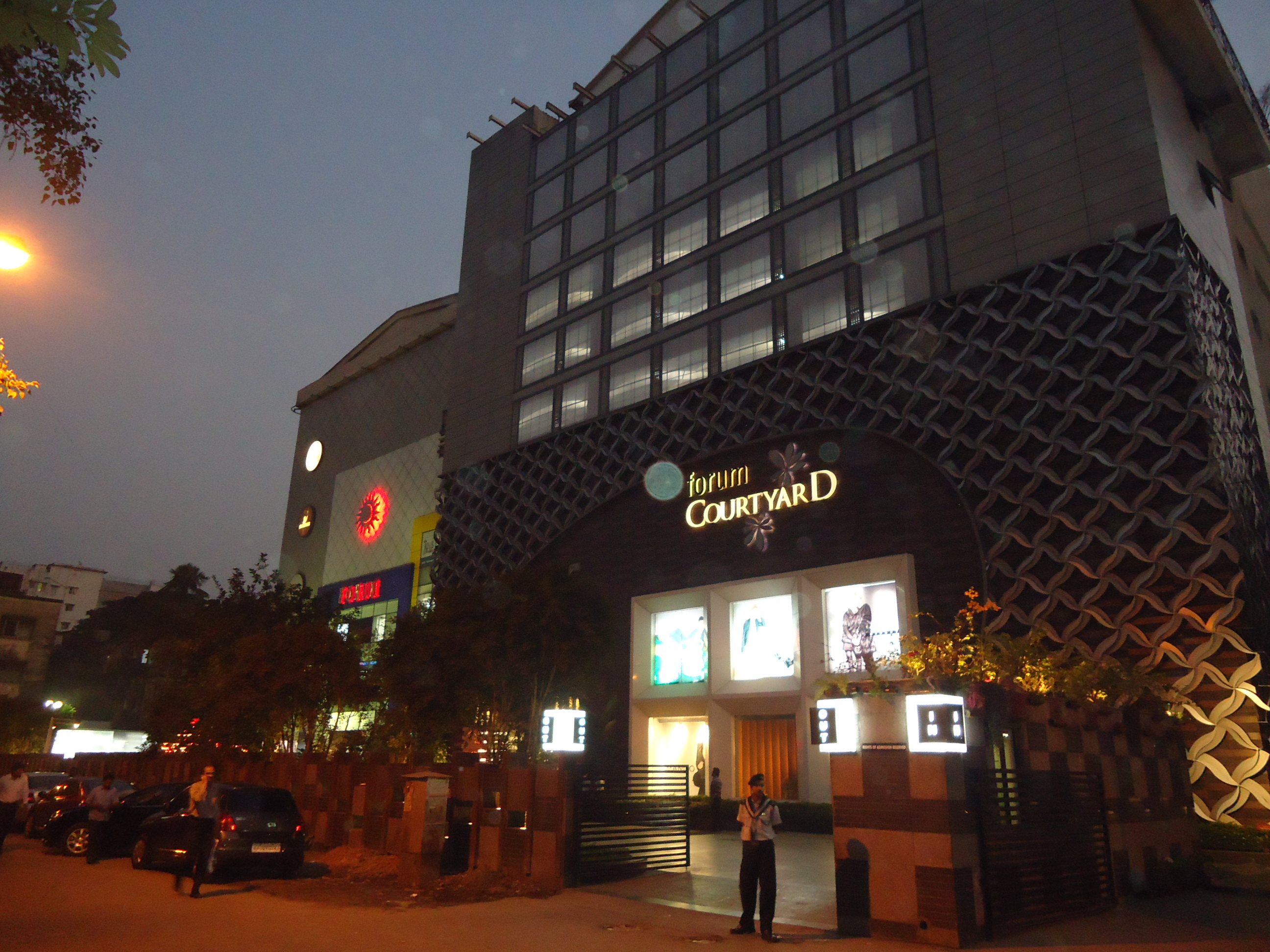
Forum & Forum Courtyard night view

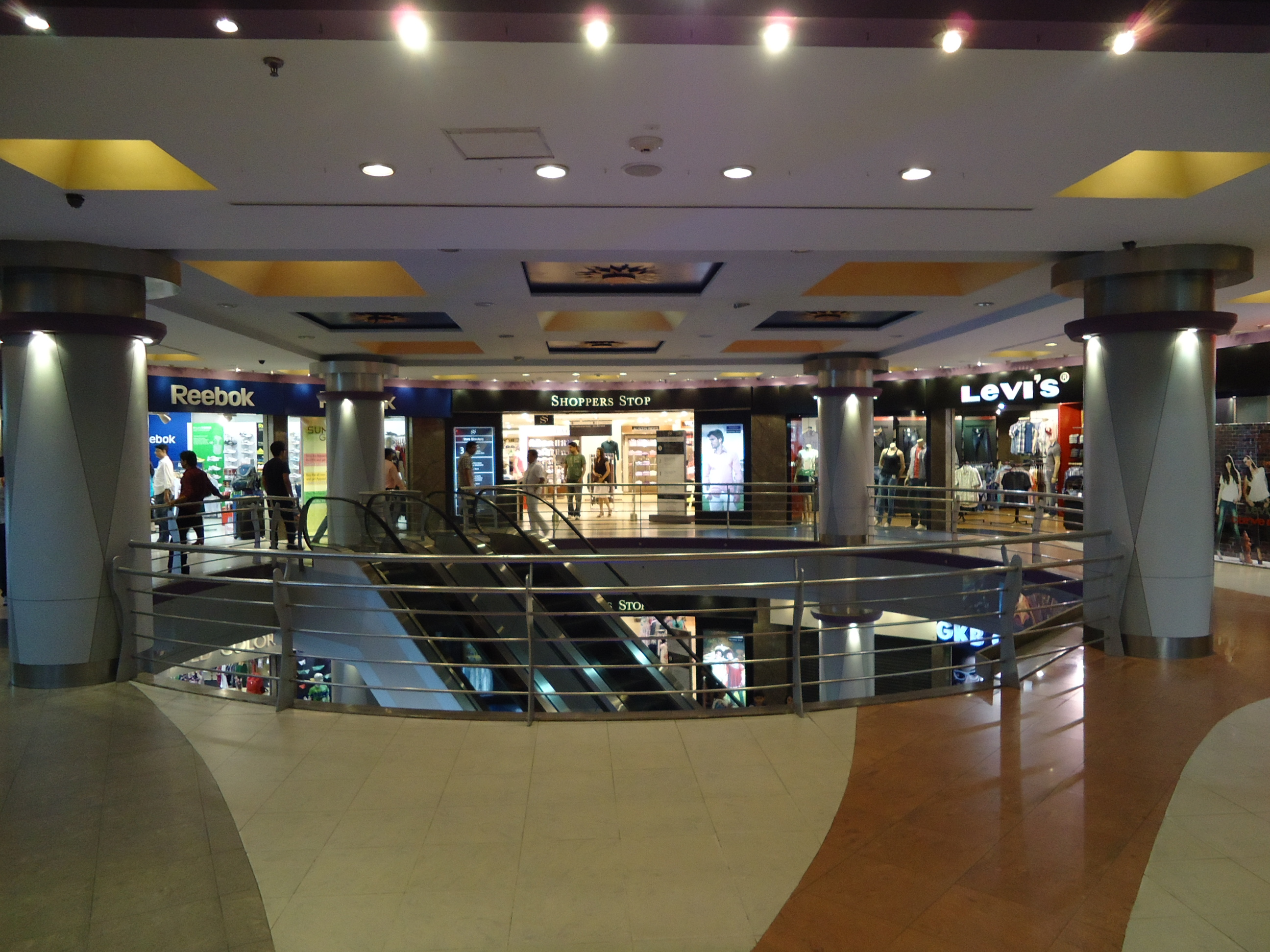
Forum Mall inside view

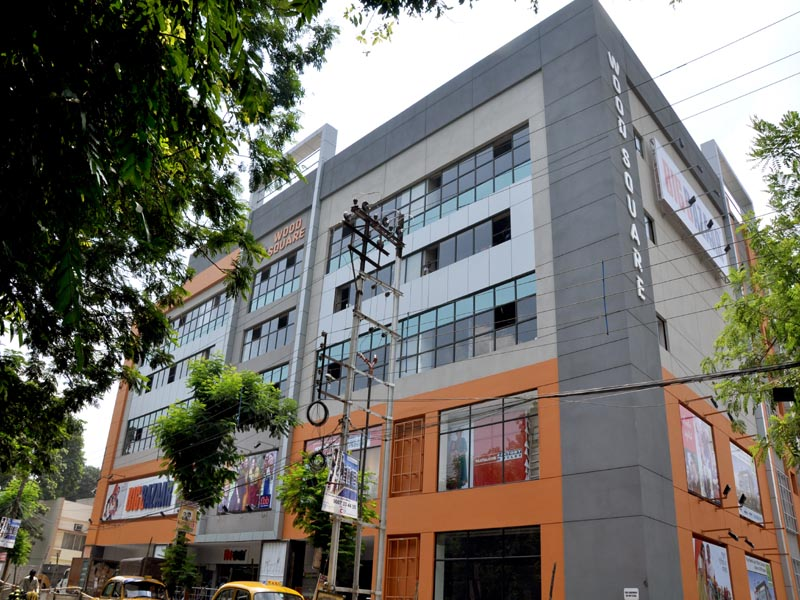
Wood Square Mall

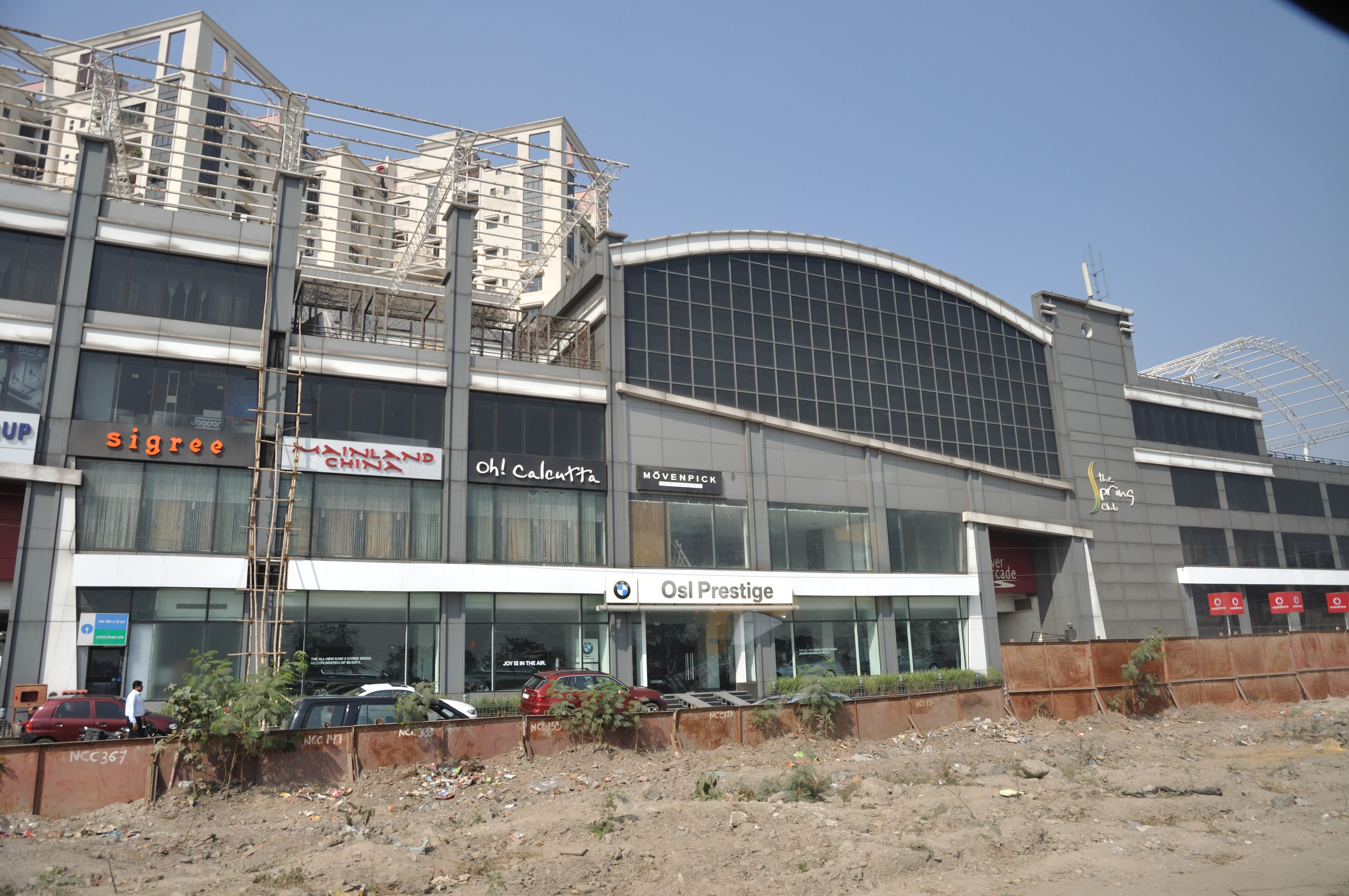
Silver Arcade
