= Crystal Mall Rajkot =

Crystal Mall (Rajkot)
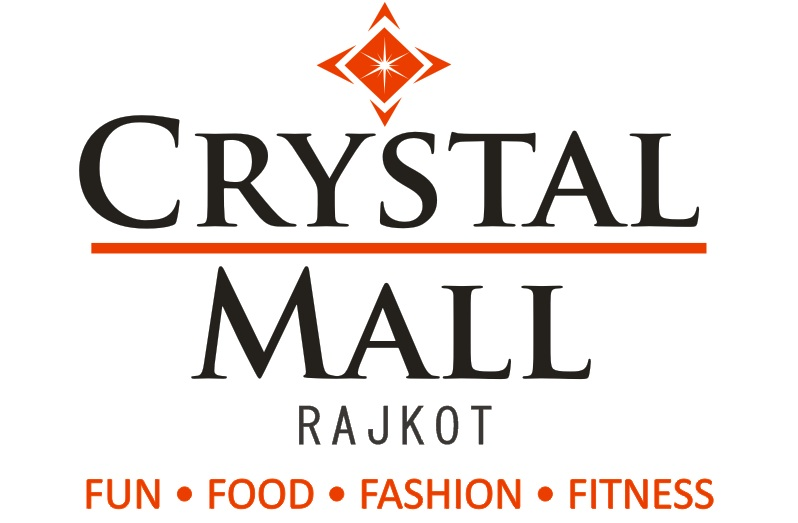
- Logo

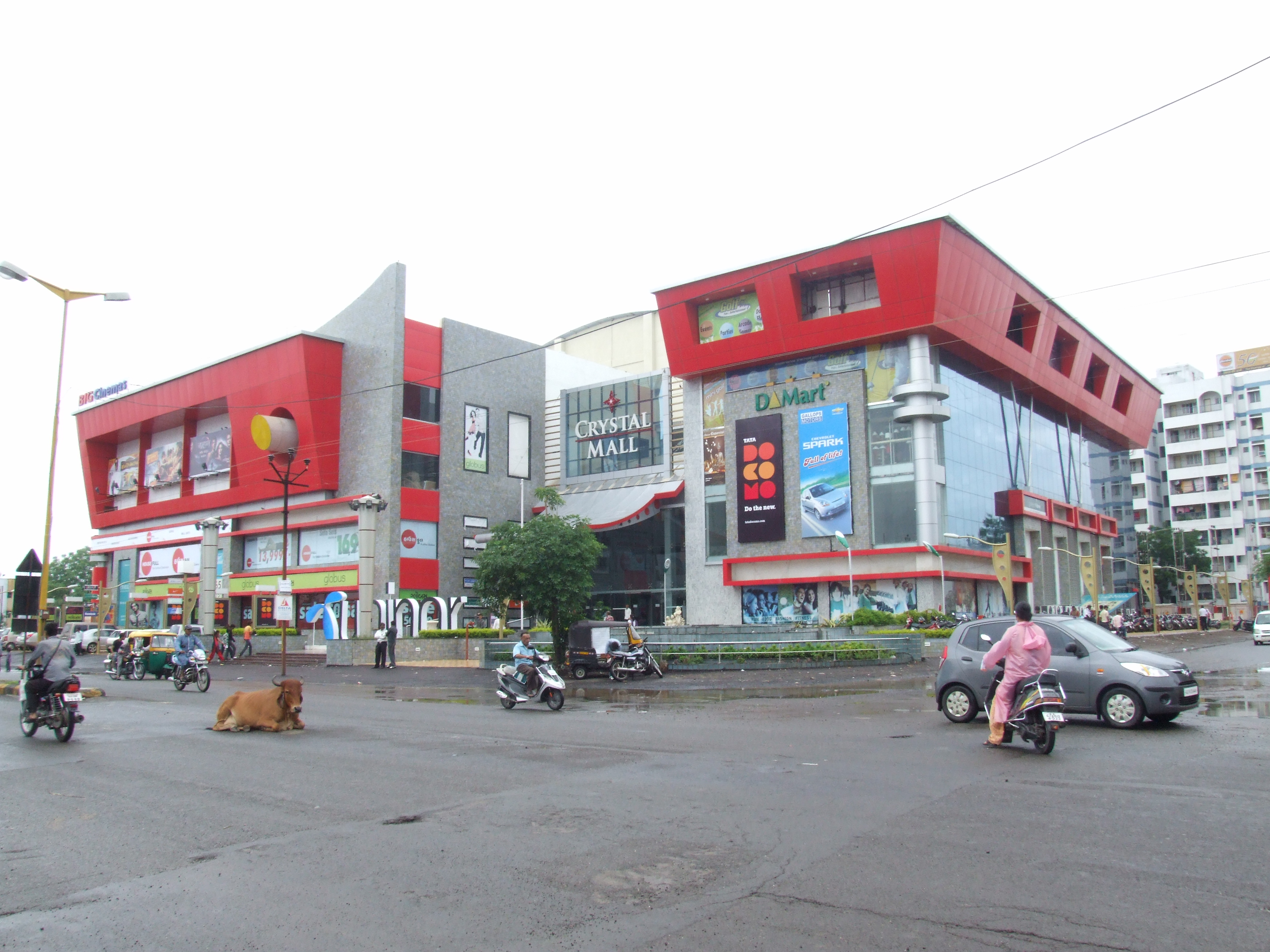
- Crystal Mall Rajkot Road Side View
- Interactive map of the Crystal Mall (Rajkot) area
- Alternative names: C M

General information
- Type: Shopping Mall
- Location: Rajkot, Gujarat, India
- Coordinates: 22°16′47.47″N 70°45′47.62″E
- Inaugurated: 28 September 2009

Technical details
- Floor count: 4 + 2
- Floor area: 150,000 sq ft (14,000 m^{2})

Design and construction
- Architecture firm: Designers Collaborative (Mehboob Lightwala)
- Developer: Gandhi Realty (I) Pvt Ltd
- Main contractor: Shrinathji Buildcon

Other information
- Number of stores: 52+
- Number of anchors: 5
- Parking: 400 spaces, including two 2-story ramps and overflow surface lots.

Website
- Official website

Crystal Mall is a shopping mall located in Rajkot in Gujarat State of India. It is located on western part of Rajkot City on main Kalawad Road. Gandhi Realty owns and manages the Crystal Mall. The mall opened to the public on 28 September 2009.

The complex includes many brands. It has a cinema and a food court.

== Design ==
Crystal Mall Rajkot has a gross leasable area of 150,000 sq ft (14,000 m^{2}). The main atrium of Crystal Mall Rajkot is spread about 10,000 sq ft (0.23 acres). The mall is nearly square building, with a roughly C-shape floor plans. Over 52 stores are arranged along five levels of pedestrian walkways on the sides of the rectangle with 3 Screen Multiplex Cinema on second floor & third floor. Four anchor stores are located at the corners.

The mall is organized into four different zones, each with its own decorative style. Two nearly identical floors of the mall provide 400 car parking spaces.

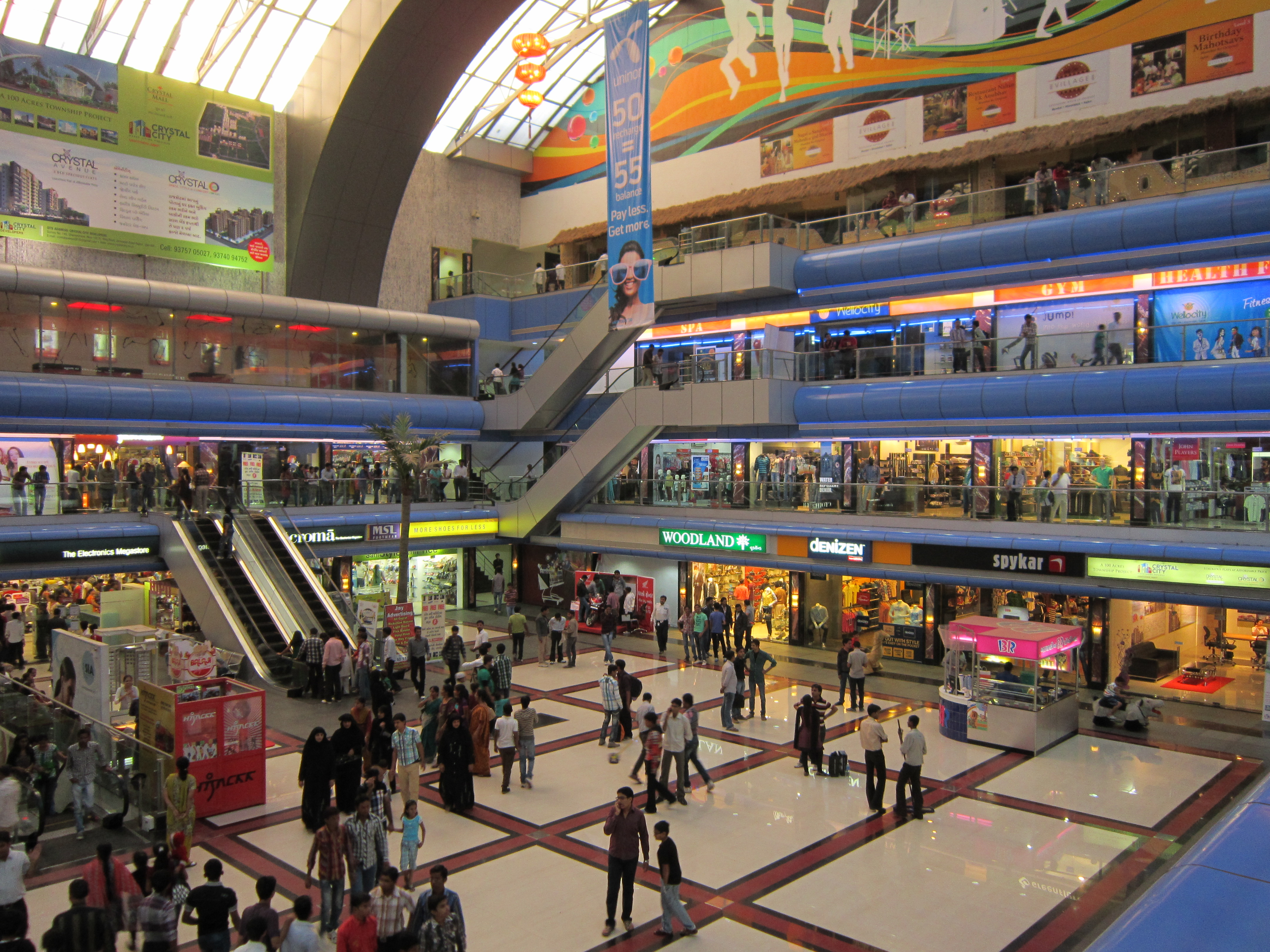
Crystal Mall Rajkot Inside View

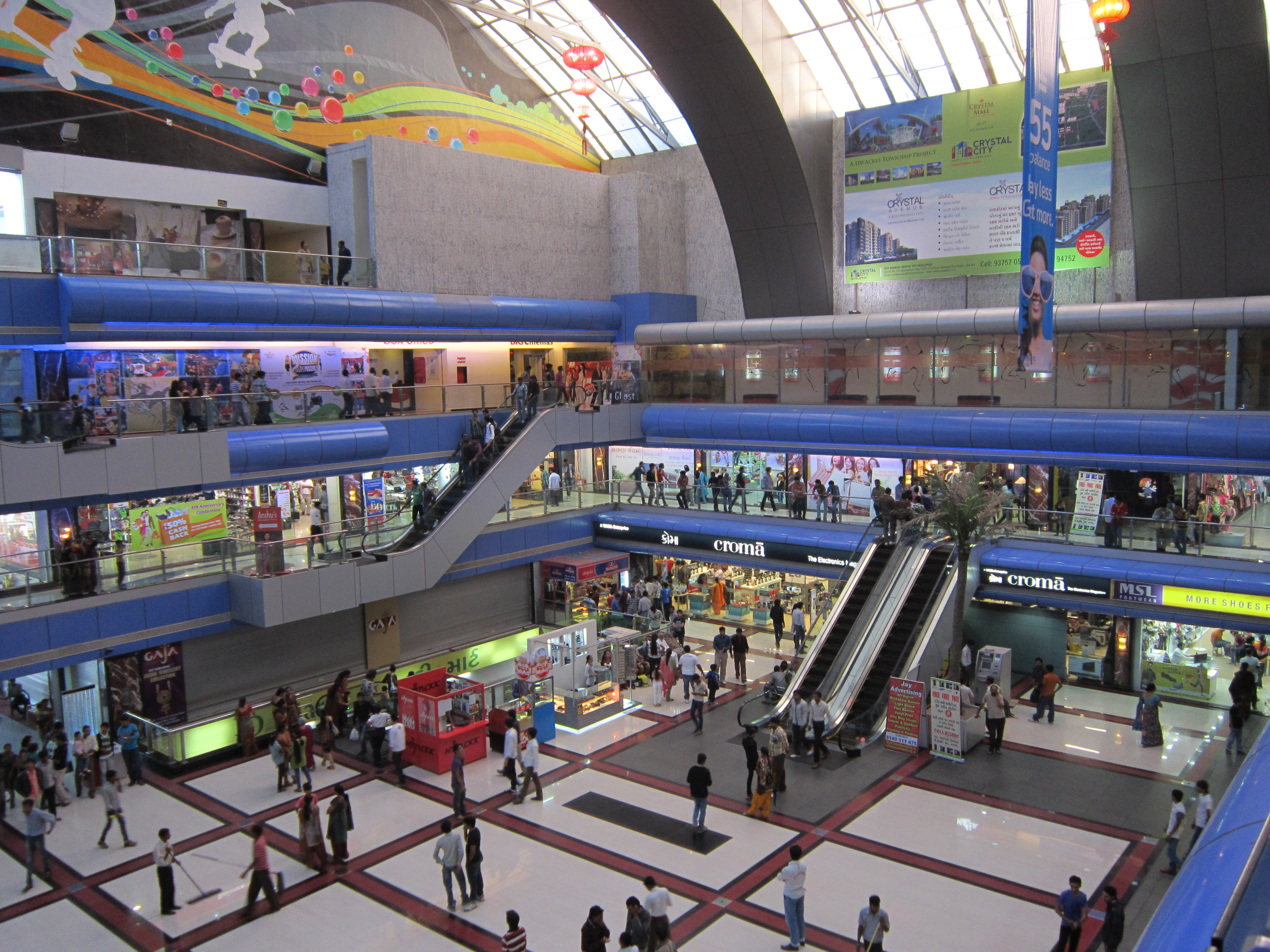
Crystal Mall Interior View
