= Symphony Mall =

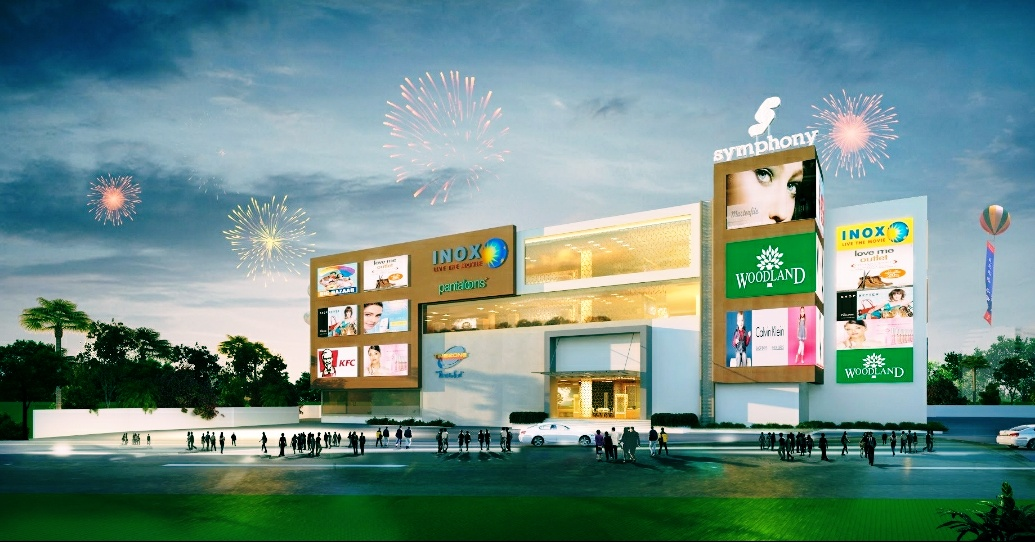
- Symphony Mall by Oorjita Builders
- Location: Bhubaneswar, India
- Coordinates: 20.323042°N 85.881454°E
- Address: Oorjita Symphony Mall, NH-5, Bhubaneswar - 751010 (Odisha)
- Opened: 1 April 2019
- Developer: Oorjita Builders
- Num. of stores: 150+
- Floors: G+4
- Parking: 2 Levels
- Website: www.symphonymall.com

Symphony Mall is a shopping mall in Rudrapur area of Bhubaneswar, India. It opened on 1 April 2019. The mall has three shopping levels, two parking levels, and an entertainment and food court level.

Symphony Mall is one of the commercial joint developments of Oorjita Projects and Pancham Studios. The project offers commercial shops at very competitive and affordable prices. The site is well connected by different modes of transportation and is nearby to various civic utilities. The project is well equipped with all modern amenities and a 24 x 7 security service to facilitate the business needs.

In October 2019, the Bhubaneswar Development Authority (BDA) issued notices to 14 commercial establishments, including the Symphony Mall, for misusing parking areas and for collecting parking fees from visitors illegally.

== Features ==
- Service lifts
- Two levels of parking
- Common toilets on each floor
- Sprinklers and smoke detectors in common area
