= Magneto The Mall =

Shopping mall in Chhattisgarh, India

Magneto The Mall, Raipur
- Location: Raipur, Chhattisgarh, India
- Coordinates: 21.240°N 81.684°E
- Address: NH-53, Great Eastern Rd, beside Signature Homes 2, Labhandi, Raipur
- Opened: 5 February 2010
- Owner: Avinash Group
- Num. of stores: 120
- Floor area: 1,035,000 sq. ft.
- Floors: 6
- Parking: Multilevel
- Website: www.magnetothemall.com

Magneto The Mall (officially known as Avinash Magneto The Mall) is a shopping mall located at Raipur, Chhattisgarh, India. It was opened on February 5, 2010 by Avinash Group.

== Information ==
The mall is situated on the G.E. Road and it is split into 6 floors with a dedicated area of 1,035,000 sq.ft. It is home to 120 national and international brands. It also has a 4-screen multiplex and a gaming zone.
