= Tandalja =

Coordinates: 22.286766°N 73.149712°E

Tandlaja is urban and village area of Vadodara City, Gujarat, India. it is located on western side of Vadodara. It has some historical places such as an old stepwell built by maharajas. It is fastest growing area of Vadodara.
