= Northwestern Syria offensive (April–August 2019) =

Syrian government military operation against rebels

- Part of the Syrian Civil War
- Situation in northwestern Syria as of 31 August 2019. Locations of Turkish and Russian outposts are pictured. Syrian Army control Syrian Opposition control Syrian Army & SDF control
Date	30 April – 31 August 2019 (4 months and 1 day)
Location	Northwestern Syria: Northwestern Hama Governorate; Southern Idlib Governorate; Northeastern Latakia Governorate
Result	Syrian Arab Army and allies victory
Territorial changes	Syrian Arab Army captures 66 towns and villages, including the strategic towns of Khan Shaykhun, Kafr Nabudah, Qalaat al-Madiq, Al-Sayyad, Kafr Zita, Morek, Al-Lataminah, al-Habit and Al-Tamanah; Syrian Army encircles the Turkish observation post at Morek; Multiple Syrian Army attacks on Kabani repelled

Belligerents
(Ba'athist Syria) Syrian Arab Republic; Russia; Iran; Allied militias: Arab Nationalist Guard; Ba'ath Brigades; Syrian Resistance; Eagles of the Whirlwind; Palestinian Syrian militias; Hezbollah (from July 2019); Wagner Group	Syrian Opposition; Syrian Salvation Government; (Syrian opposition) Syrian Interim Government; National Front for Liberation; Rouse the Believers Operations Room; Jaysh al-Izza; Movement of Salah al-Din the Kurd; Turkistan Islamic Party; Imam Bukhari Jamaat; Ajnad al-Kavkaz; Junud al-Sham; Caucasus Emirate; Malhama Tactical; Turkey (sporadic clashes)

Commanders and leaders
Maher al-Assad; Suheil al-Hassan; Ghiath Dalla; Bashar Ratabah †; Nizar Mahmoud †; Maj. Alaa Mohammed Khaddour †; Abdullah Sabah Ajaj †	Abu Mohammad al-Julani; Osama Hussein al-Dib †; Mansur Dagestani †; Jamil al-Saleh (WIA); Abdul Baset al-Sarout †; Abu Muhammad al-Muhajir; Abu Riad al-Deiri †; Abu Musab al-Tunisi †; Abu Setif al-Binnishi †; Abu Qatada al-Homsi †; Abu Salman Belarus (Malhama Tactical leader) †; Abu Omar al Dayk †; Mohammad Husein Qasem †; Sayf Bulad; Abdullah Halawa; Abdul Jashari

Units involved
Syrian Arab Armed Forces; Syrian Arab Army; 1st Armored Division; 61st Brigade; 141st Brigade; 4th Armoured Division; 555th Regiment; 2nd Armored Division; 6th Armored Division; 5th Mechanized Division; 112th Brigade; 7th Mechanized Division; 78th Brigade; 121st Brigade; 8th Armored Division; 9th Armoured Division; 43rd Brigade; 11th Armored Division; 87th Brigade; 18th Armored Division; 5th Corps; 25th Special Mission Forces Division; Al-Tarmih group; Raqqa Hawks; Republican Guard; Elements of 104, 105, 106 and 124 Brigades; Syrian Arab Air Force; National Defense Forces; Units from Suqaylabia; Units from Muhrada; Units from Masyaf; Russian Armed Forces; Russian Aerospace Forces; Special operations forces; Wagner Group; (Iran) Iranian Armed Forces; IRGC; Ruhollah Formations; Palestinian Syrian militias; Jerusalem Brigade; Free Palestine Movement	Hay'at Tahrir al-Sham; Jaish al-Muhajireen wal-Ansar; Tawhid and Jihad Battalion; Popular Resistance Companies; Syrian Islamic Jihad Union (ex-Ansar Jihad); Syrian National Army; 9th Special Forces Division of Aleppo; 20th Division; 112th Brigade; Samarkand Brigades; Ahrar al-Sharqiya; Hasakah Shield Brigade; Jaysh al-Sharqiya; Hamza Division; Jaysh al-Islam; (Syrian opposition) Authenticity and Development Front; Levant Front; Glory Corps; National Front for Liberation; Sham Legion; Ahrar al-Sham; Suqour al-Sham Brigades; Jaysh al-Ahrar; 23rd Division; 1st Coastal Division; Army of Victory; Jaysh al-Nukhba; Free Idlib Army; 2nd Coastal Division; 1st Infantry Division; Jaysh al-Thani; Liwa Ahrar al-Shamal; Freedom Brigade; Special Forces; Rouse the Believers Operations Room; Hurras al-Din; Ansar al-Tawhid; Jama'at Ansar al-Islam; Ansar al-Din Front; Jaysh al-Izza; Liwa Homs al-Adiya

Strength
Unknown	60,000

Casualties and losses
(Ba'athist Syria) 1,391 killed (Ba'athist Syria) 1 SyAAF Su-22 shot down	1,659 killed 1 killed
- 1,043 civilians killed

The 2019 northwestern Syria offensive, codenamed "Dawn of Idlib" (Arabic: فجر إدلب), was a military operation launched on 30 April 2019 by the Syrian Armed Forces and its allies against rebel groups in northwestern Syria during the Syrian civil war in a region known as "Greater Idlib", consisting of northwest Hama, southern Idlib and northeastern Latakia provinces. The government's main objectives were to open the M5 highway and to expel non-compliant militant groups, particularly Hay'at Tahrir al-Sham (HTS), from the 15–20 km demilitarized zone demarcated by Turkey and Russia at Sochi in 2018. The offensive was seen by both parties as crucial to the outcome of the Syrian civil war.

On 1 August 2019, the Syrian government declared that it would halt its operation on Idlib on the next day. In response, Hay'at Tahrir al-Sham stated that the truce proved "the failure of the criminal regime’s military operation against the liberated north." In response to HTS refusal to agree to a ceasefire, alongside HTS' refusal to comply with the parameters of the Sochi Agreement, the Syrian Army resumed the offensive on 5 August, capturing numerous villages and strategic hilltops in southern Idlib before seizing Khan Shaykhun and subsequently the entire rebel-held pocket in southern Idlib.

During the course of the offensive, the Syrian and Russian air forces continually conducted airstrikes against rebel positions, while pro-government ground forces intensively targeted them with surface-to-surface missiles and heavy artillery on a daily basis.

== Background ==
In late 2018, a demilitarization deal in Idlib was brokered between Russia, Iran, and Turkey. The deal set up a belt-like demilitarized zone (DMZ) entirely within rebel-held areas, encompassing the entire contact line between Syrian government and rebel territory. The deal required the al-Qaeda-linked jihadist group Hay'at Tahrir al-Sham (HTS) and other Islamist rebel groups to withdraw from the zone entirely. The HTS-run Syrian Salvation Government would then be dissolved. The relatively moderate and Turkish-backed National Front for Liberation (NFL), a coalition of 11 rebel factions, was allowed to remain within the demilitarized zone, but were to withdraw all heavy weapons from it, including tanks, multiple rocket launcher artillery, mortars and more. Turkey would establish military observation posts on the rebel side of the contact zone, while Russia and Iran would do likewise on the government side. Furthermore, the rebel groups had to open and ensure unrestricted civilian access through the M4 and M5 highways that span across the rebel-held Idlib Governorate.

The deal, however, was never fully implemented. In early 2019, Hay'at Tahrir al-Sham launched an offensive against the National Front for Liberation, establishing control over almost the entirety of rebel-held Greater Idlib. The NFL struck a peace deal with HTS, ending the fighting between the two groups and allowing HTS to take over the Idlib region. Counter to the terms of the demilitarization deal, the Syrian Salvation Government was not dissolved and instead extended its rule to all of the recently HTS-captured areas, including those within the demilitarized zone. The M4 and M5 highways were never reopened. The deadline for HTS withdrawal from the DMZ was extended multiple times to allow more time for Turkey to broker a political deal, but the withdrawal never took place. This led to HTS and Syrian government elements stationed along the deconfliction line to frequently exchange artillery fire and shelling, undermining any ceasefire terms brokered in the demilitarization deal.

In late April 2019, the Syrian and Russian air forces undertook an extended air campaign against the rebel groups still residing within the DMZ. The campaign was supported by artillery and missile fire from the Syrian Arab Army (SAA). For example, on 28 April, the Martyr Akram Ali Ibrahim Al-Ahmad school in Qalaat al-Madiq was bombed by government forces. The Russian government declared that the deal was not implemented by the rebel groups, hence justifying military action.

== The offensive ==
On 30 April 2019, the situation in the region escalated when large numbers of Syrian Army troops were redeployed to Hama and Idlib provinces after getting approval to launch an offensive against the rebel-held "Greater Idlib" region. The same day, heavy Syrian government and Russian airstrikes were launched throughout northwestern Syria in preparation for an upcoming ground offensive. The strikes were launched three days after HTS attacks on government positions along the frontline left 22 pro-government fighters dead. On the first day of the bombardment, the Syrian and Russian air forces launched their largest attack of the year, targeting dozens of towns and villages. On 3 May, government forces bombed Rakaya Sijneh health centre.

=== Opening advances ===
On 6 May, after six days of intensive airstrikes on the region by Syrian and Russian warplanes, the Syrian Army launched its ground assault against HTS and NFL-held areas in northern Hama and southern Idlib. The Syrian government stated that the assault was provoked by increased rebel attacks on government-held areas originating from within the DMZ. The Idlib-based rebel groups argued that the government's real goal of the offensive was to capture the M4 and M5 highways in the Idlib Governorate.

On 7 May, Syrian government forces captured the villages of Tel Othman, al-Bani and al-Janabara. The pro-opposition Syrian Observatory for Human Rights (SOHR) war monitor reported that at least 69 civilians and 41 rebels had been killed since the beginning of the escalation. The Russian Air Force intensified airstrikes against the rebels in response to missiles and mortar shells that reportedly had been fired against Russia's Khmeimim Air Base the previous day by unidentified militants. The Syrian Army reported that it had killed 15 rebels in the previous day, while losing 11 servicemen. The United Kingdom said that a dozen children had been killed in the government offensive and barrel bombs had been used for the first time in seven months. The United Nations said that 30,000 people had been made homeless, 5,500 left without water, four health facilities had been destroyed and at least two schools damaged.

==== Capture of Kafr Nabudah ====
On 8 May, the Syrian Army captured the town of Kafr Nabudah after a brief battle. Pro-Syrian government media released footage showing armored vehicles belonging to the Tiger Forces maneuvering inside the town. The Syrian Army also reportedly advanced from northeast Latakia, capturing Point 1154 in Jabal Zuwayqat. After pro-government forces captured the town of Kafr Nabudah, Hay'at Tahrir al-Sham launched a counterattack at night with a car bomb spearheading the attack, followed by an armed assault on positions held by the Tiger Forces; after hours of fighting, HTS stated to have retaken the town; however, this statement was denied by the Syrian Army. The Russian Defence Ministry reported that the Khmeimim Air Base had once again been targeted with missiles fired from within the DMZ by groups which they identified as Katiba Ard al-Bab and Katiba Jabel Butma (both of which are designated terrorist groups by Russia). All 12 missiles fired at the base were reportedly shot down by its anti-air defenses, causing no casualties or damage. The positions from which the missiles were fired were then reportedly bombed by Russian warplanes and Syrian Army artillery.

==== Capture of Qalaat al-Madiq ====
On 9 May, the Syrian Army captured the town of Qalaat al-Madiq, as well as the villages of Tell Huwash, Al-Tuwainah and Al-Karkat from rebel forces. The Syrian Army later established its control over the village of Shariah, as well as Tal al-Sakhr and its surrounding farms. A National Front for Liberation (NFL) spokesman announced the group's withdrawal from the area, stating that Qalaat al-Madiq was already militarily lost for them by that point. The Syrian and Russian air forces continued to target rebel positions in northwestern Syria with airstrikes.

On 10 May, joint rebel forces spearheaded by Hay'at Tahrir al-Sham (HTS) launched a counterattack to recapture Kafr Nabudah. The rebels encountered stiff Syrian Army resistance, sparking fierce clashes. They came under heavy fire from airstrikes and government artillery. Syrian state media reported the counterattack was repelled by government forces. Rebel forces did, however, manage to take the villages of Shariah and Ard al-Bab, posting videos on Twitter and Telegram to corroborate their statements.

On 11 May, the Syrian Army recaptured the village of Shariah amid heavy air and artillery strikes targeting rebel positions. The Syrian Army also captured the villages of Arima and Midan Ghazal following clashes with Hay'at Tahrir al-Sham, according to Russian state media and social media reports. The pro-opposition Syrian Observatory for Human Rights reported that up to that point the Syrian government had managed to capture at least 9 villages during the offensive. Later that day, the Syrian Army said it captured three more villages: al-Jamaziya, Bab al-Taqa and Mustariha.

On 12 May, rebel groups shelled the government-held town of Al-Suqaylabiyah in retaliation for the offensive, reportedly killing six civilians, including a woman and five children. The Russian Air Force responded by launching several airstrikes against rebel positions. On the same day the Hay'at Tahrir al-Sham affiliated Syrian Salvation Government announced the creation of the "Popular Resistance" to organize civilian militias under its command to assist in defending rebel-held areas from the government's offensive.

On 13 May, the Syrian Army recaptured Tell Huwash after briefly losing control over it during a rebel counterattack. It also captured the villages of Al-Hawash and Al-Jabriyah after clashes with Hay'at Tahrir al-Sham and the National Front for Liberation. Shortly thereafter, the Syrian Army captured the villages of Tuba and Sheikh Idris from rebel forces. Jaysh al-Izza, backed by HTS and the NFL, launched a counterattack on the Hamamiyat front, south of Kafr Nabudah, and also reportedly shelled the city of Al-Suqaylabiyah again, with Syrian state media reporting one civilian was killed and five wounded. The SOHR reported the clashes in Hamamiyat, al-Jabin and on the outskirts of Karnaz had stopped after the withdrawal of the rebel groups from the area, signalling the failure of the counterattack. Later, a local source reported that rebel groups recaptured Sheikh Idris.

On 14 May, Syrian Army forces began advancing deeper into the Ghab Plain. By the end of the day, the Syrian Army had captured the villages of al-Mujahirin, al-Hamra, and a nearby airstrip.

On 15 May, the Syrian Army captured the entire al-Huwayz area, including all three towns located at the southwestern slope of Zawiya Mountain.

On 16 May, HTS forces repelled a Syrian Army 4th Division-led infiltration attempt on the Kabani axis in Latakia, killing and wounding several Syrian Army and NDF soldiers. The failed infiltration was in support of the Syrian Army's upcoming major assault to capture the strategic town of Kabani, set to be spearheaded by the 42nd Brigade (Ghiath Forces) of the 4th Armored Division, and to be supported by the Tiger Forces. The Syrian Army had launched a number of attacks on Kabani over the previous two weeks, but was repelled each time, suffering several casualties.

On 17 May, the Syrian Army massed troops for the expected assault on Kabani, while rebel positions within and around the town were hit numerous times by government artillery and Russian airstrikes.

=== Three-day ceasefire and rebel counteroffensive ===
On 18 May, the Syrian Army declared a three-day ceasefire and put the offensive on hold. The National Front for Liberation stated that it would reject all ceasefire proposals unless the Syrian Army returns all occupied areas to rebel control. Several hours later, the Turkistan Islamic Party claimed an ATGM strike on a Syrian Army BMP, demonstrating the group's rejection of the ceasefire. On 19 May, the Russian Reconciliation Center for Syria reported that rebel groups had conducted 13 attacks on government positions since the start of the ceasefire, leading to 3 injuries among SAA servicemen. It further stated that rebel attacks on Russia's Khmeimim Air Base had not ceased, noting 12 attacks on the airbase in the past month. Factions of the Turkish-backed Free Syrian Army, including Ahrar al-Sharqiya, a group composed of exiles mostly from the Deir ez-Zor Governorate, and several groups previously expelled by HTS, sent reinforcements from northern Aleppo to Idlib and Hama to assist the rebels in fighting the government forces.

==== Rebel recapture of Kafr Nabudah ====
By 21 May, the reprieve had ended. The Russian Ministry of Defence stated that the rebel groups had not respected the ceasefire. The Syrian Army and NDF units attempted to advance on Kabani, but were reportedly repelled by HTS and TIP forces. Various rebel groups staged a joint attack on government-held areas near al-Hamimiat and al-Jabin, but were reportedly repelled by the SAA. A second counteroffensive was launched by the NFL, storming several pro-government positions with HTS deploying an SVBIED as well; no advances were reported by either side. The chief of the Russian Centre for Reconciliation in Syria stated that HTS forces were continuing their advance on Kafr Nabudah into the evening, with HTS deploying several SVBIEDs and tanks in the assault. By the end of the day, rebel forces had successfully recaptured Kafr Nabudah after pushing government forces out of the town after a second assault.

On 22 May, pro-government media reported that the Syrian Army was able to establish a presence in Kafr Nabudah, after launching a counterattack against the rebel offensive, however the town still remained under rebel control. The NFL and Jaysh al-Izza released images on social media, to show their involvement in the attack on the town with T-62 and T-72 tanks, as well as Turkish-made Panthera F9 armored vehicles. Pro-government media reported that HTS mounted an attack on Qalaat al-Madiq, the second town recently captured by the Syrian Army. Concurrently, it reported that the Syrian Army had advanced into Kafr Nabudah, but encountered heavy resistance from Hay'at Tahrir al-Sham fighters that had entrenched themselves in the northern part of the town. On the same day, the Russian defence ministry reported that the Syrian Army had managed to repel a separate HTS assault, in which 200 HTS fighters, with four IFVs, attempted to capture the village of Al-Hayrat. Russia also stated that pro-government forces were able to inflict 150 casualties on the rebel groups that took part in the offensive within the previous 24 hours. The National Defence Forces released a video showing their Mhardeh division taking part in the battle for Kafr Nabudah. Meanwhile, in response to suspected Syrian government attacks on a Turkish observation post in recent days, Turkish defense minister Hulusi Akar stated that Turkey will not evacuate its observation posts in Greater Idlib amid the offensive. The Syrian Army reported having killed an HTS commander named Osama Hussein al-Dib in an ambush operation.

==== Reported chemical attack ====
On 22 May, four Hay'at Tahrir al-Sham fighters stated they had been injured by chlorine gas munitions launched by pro-government forces three days prior, on Sunday 19 May. The Russian Defence Ministry said HTS staged a fake chemical attack. The head of the Russian Centre for Reconciliation in Syria stated that, according to captured HTS fighters, HTS had developed a "chemical wing" tasked with the creation of chemical weapons for a false flag attack that would then be blamed on the Syrian government. The Syrian Ministry of Foreign Affairs and Expatriates denied the statements, stating that no chemical weapons had been used and adding that Syria "had cooperated fully with the Organisation for the Prohibition of Chemical Weapons (OPCW) which declared Syria free of chemical weapons". The White Helmets stated that "there was no confirmation of the attack", while the Syrian Observatory for Human Rights stated that there was "no proof at all" that any kind of chemical attack had been carried out.

The United States government stated it would "investigate" whether the Syrian government used chemical weapons, as stated, and threatened to "respond quickly" should the reports be confirmed. The United Kingdom stated that they would "respond" if any chemical weapons were proven to have been used. The French government said that it had "noted the allegations with concern". U.S. Special Envoy for the Syrian conflict, James Franklin Jeffrey, later stated to the United States House of Representatives foreign relations committee that the attack reports could not be confirmed. The U.S., UK, and France had previously launched limited attacks on the Assad government in response to reported chemical attacks in prior years, particularly the 2017 Shayrat missile strike and the 2018 missile strikes.

==== Continued air war ====
On 23 May, the Syrian Electricity Minister, Muhammad Kharboutli, stated that the damage done the previous day to the Al-Zarah thermal electric power plant was by then fully repaired and the plant continued providing electricity to Syria's northern regions. The battle for Kafr Nabudah continued, with airstrikes intensifying throughout the day. A Sky News team reported coming under fire from SAA tanks while filming a burning vehicle, after it had entered into HTS-held areas along the contact line. The news team had been guided by HTS-sympathetic activist Bilal Abdul Kareem, who said he was "telling the story from the rebels' point of view". Kareem was injured by shrapnel and returned with the uninjured members of the news team to the abandoned rebel-held town of Khan Shaykhun. The team stated one of their members was wearing a marked flak jacket, while the others were wearing unmarked clothes. The Syrian Army withdrew from the southern part of Kafr Nabudah after an unsuccessful attempt to breach rebel defense lines in the town's north. It began concentrating on bombing rebel positions in and around the town in preparation for a potential future assault to recapture the town, a prospect made difficult by ongoing rebel control of several hills overlooking the town. By the end of the day, clashes in Kafr Nabudah killed 17 combatants, 11 of them Islamist rebels, with over 100 combatants being killed in Kafr Nabudah since 21 May, according to the SOHR.

On 24 May, Syrian helicopters reportedly dropped leaflets over rebel-held towns in the Idlib countryside, urging residents to leave the province entirely, in order to "protect their lives". The Syrian Army again attempted to storm Kabani, but withdrew after encountering heavy Hay'at Tahrir al-Sham and Turkistan Islamic Party resistance.

Several Turkish military convoys arrived at the Turkish observation posts near the rebel-held villages of Sarman and Sher Maghar. Pro-government media stated that Turkish observation posts within the DMZ were used to provide logistical and artillery support to rebel groups, including HTS and TIP. The Syrian Tiger Forces released images of Turkish-made Panthera F9 armored vehicles being used by rebel groups (the rebels themselves published images of the Panthera F9 in prior assaults); the Tiger Forces were reported to have destroyed two of such vehicles. A week prior, reports had emerged that Turkey was supplying ATGMs to various rebel groups during the offensive. A senior rebel commander stated that Turkey had again given the rebel forces ATGMs, as well as artillery ammunition, two days prior to the rebel counterattack on Kafr Nabudah.

==== Third battle of Kafr Nabudah ====
On 26 May, following intensive bombardment and violent clashes with rebel forces, the Syrian Army recaptured Kafr Nabudah. Pro-government forces released images on social media taken from within the town, as well as images depicting a Tiger Forces commander named Ali Zakaria Dibo, who was reportedly killed during the assault on the town. Pro-government air and artillery strikes on various rebel positions in northern Hama and southern Idlib continued with increasing intensity, with the SOHR reporting 26 May to be the heaviest day of airstrikes since the start of the offensive, with twelve civilians killed. The airstrikes reportedly caused significant damage to Hay'at Tahrir al-Sham's defenses in the region. Rebels launched a nighttime counterattack on the Kafr Nabudah front. However, a few hours after launching the attack, the rebels were reportedly forced to retreat from the eastern sector of Kafr Nabudah, leaving the Syrian Army in full control of the town.

On 29 May, the White Helmets stated the Syrian government was purposely bombarding crop fields with incendiary bombs with the aim of destroying vital crops.

=== Failed second ceasefire ===
On 30 May, Turkish defense minister Hulusi Akar reported that Russian and Turkish representatives had met to discuss a potential ceasefire. The Syrian Army said it halted its advance during the course of the talks, while the Russian air force limited the amount of airstrikes it conducted on rebel targets. The talks reportedly fell apart shortly after they began, due to a demand made by Turkey for the Syrian Army to withdraw from all areas captured during the offensive, which was rejected by Russia. Following the breakdown of ceasefire talks, the Russian air force reintensified its airstrike campaign against rebel forces, while the SAA reportedly received a "green light" to resume offensive operations.

On 31 May, rebel groups launched an attack on several villages to the north of Qalaat al-Madiq. The attack followed negotiations over a potential 48-hour ceasefire between the two sides. The Russian Air Force carried out tens of airstrikes on rebel forces in response. The Syrian Army shelled rebel units positioned near a Turkish observation post close to the village of Midan Ghazal. Opposition activists stated that the observation post was shelled directly, but the Turkish military reported no damage or casualties and did not respond to the attack.

On 1 June, Hay'at Tahrir al-Sham announced that they had executed seven people, who they stated were Russian spies, in the Idlib Governorate. On 2 June, the pro-government Liwa al-Quds announced the deaths of 20 of their fighters, that were reportedly killed during combat with HTS and TIP forces near the village of Al-Huwayz in the Hama Governorate.

Reports emerged on 3 June that the Syrian Army, spearheaded by the Tiger Forces said it had, by morning, captured the village of Qasabiyeh, which lies to the north of Kafr Nabudah. The Syrian Army, however, had not officially reported any territorial gains by noon the same day. The village was reported to be under the Syrian Army control a week after they took back the latter from rebels.

On 4 June, the Syrian Army said it captured the villages of Hamirat, Hardana and Qiratah to the north of Tell Huwash.

On 5 June, the Syrian Army was reported by pro-government media to have captured the village of Qiratah.

=== Second rebel counteroffensive ===
On 6 June, the Iranian Fars News Agency reported that the Syrian Army had so far captured at least 23 villages and towns from the various rebel groups since the start of the offensive.

Rebels launched a large counteroffensive against pro-government forces in northern Hama province, with rebel units both attacking and advancing south of the government-held town of Karnaz. The National Front for Liberation dubbed the operation "Repelling the Invaders", Hay'at Tahrir al-Sham called it "Battle of al-Mutasim Billah", while Jaysh al-Izza introduced it as the "Breaking the bones" operation. The National Front for Liberation released images on social media showing their fighters joining the attack on the town with BMP-1 IFVs, T-62 tanks and Turkish-made Panthera F9 armored vehicles; rebel forces also reported destroying a Syrian Army tank near Qasabiyeh with an ATGM. By the end of the day, rebel forces were in control over the strategic villages of Jubbayn, Tell Malah and Kafr Houd, cutting off a government supply route in the northwestern Hama countryside.

On 7 June, the Syrian Army recaptured the village of Kafr Houd. Fierce clashes erupted between Syrian government and opposition forces for Tell Malah. The Syrian Army received reinforcements from Mahardah, Masyaf, Qamhana and Al-Suqaylabiyah, following which it launched a renewed attack against the rebel counter-offensive. Rebel forces unsuccessfully attempted to shoot down a Syrian Air Force Su-22 warplane over North Hama with anti-aircraft weapons. The Syrian Army retook the key hilltop of Tell Malah, reopening the supply route between Mahardah and Al-Suqaylabiyah. Reports suggested that over 30 Syrian Army soldiers were killed up to that point during the renewed rebel counter-offensive. Rebel forces reportedly bombed several government-held areas near Qardanah in Latakia Governorate, as well as near Mahardah town in the Hama Governorate, with BM-21 Grad MLRS. By late afternoon, Syrian and Russian airstrikes on the positions recently captured by rebel forces had intensified significantly. Rebel forces announced the launch of a second phase in their offensive against government-held areas, dubbing it "al-Fatah al-Tahrir". Rebel units struck the government-held Hama Airport with surface-to-surface missiles. The pro-opposition Syrian Observatory for Human Rights reported that by evening at least 44 pro-government and 39 rebel fighters had been killed in the fighting over the last 24 hours. Syrian state media reported that rebel forces had bombed residential neighbourhoods in the government-held towns of Karnaz and Mahardah with artillery and missiles, causing material damage.

On 8 June, Russian aircraft performed numerous airstrikes on the areas taken by the rebels during their second counteroffensive, while the Syrian Army engaged in combat with rebel units attempting to storm Karnaz. Rebel forces reported destroying a fourth Syrian Army tank with an ATGM. Rebel anti-aircraft guns attempted to shoot down a Syrian Air Force L-39 Albatros, but failed. Jaysh al-Izza commander and former football goalkeeper Abdul Baset al-Sarout was killed during combat with the Syrian Army after joining the rebel offensive in northern Hama.

=== Failed third ceasefire ===
On 12 June, the Syrian Army announced a renewed 72-hour ceasefire, following negotiations between the Russian and Turkish armed forces. In addition to halting ground operations, the Syrian and Russian air forces ceased to conduct airstrikes on rebel targets, which had been going on continuously until that point. Reportedly, one of the conditions of the ceasefire was the creation of a humanitarian corridor, which would allow civilians to be evacuated from the combat zones. Russian foreign minister, Sergey Lavrov, told the Turkish Anadolu Agency that his country had been negotiating with Turkey to restore the Idlib memorandum, giving Turkey the task of separating 'armed opposition' from 'terrorist' groups. He described both civilians and opposition groups in Idlib as "hostages" of Hay'at Tahrir al-Sham, adding that he thought Syrians would be able to return to their homes and normal life would resume once Turkey had finished separating the groups. Ahrar al-Sham reportedly rejected the ceasefire and vowed to keep fighting. Recently rebel-captured positions near Tell Malah and other surrounding villages were nonetheless targeted with artillery shelling, although no ground movements were made due to the ceasefire. By this stage, according to Al-Masdar, the Syrian Army had captured approximately 200 square kilometers while the militants had captured 35 square kilometers. The Syrian army lost some of the territory it had controlled before the operation was launched.

On 13 June, the National Front for Liberation denied the existence of any ceasefire. By dawn, a Turkish observation post near Shahranaz had been shelled for unknown reasons. The Turkish Government blamed the Syrian Government for the attack and stated that Turkey will "do what is necessary" if pro-government forces continue attacks. Turkey reported no fatalities, but stated that three Turkish soldiers had been injured in the attack. Russia's Defence Ministry denied that the Syrian Army had shelled the observation post, instead blaming "terrorists" for the attack. The ministry further stated that the Turkish army had asked Moscow to ensure the safety of its personnel and strike rebel positions. The ministry subsequently reported that Russian warplanes had carried out four airstrikes on rebel targets, the coordinates of which were provided by the Turkish Armed Forces.

On 14 June, Turkey's foreign minister stated that the ceasefire "had not been fully secured". The Syrian Army released video footage, reportedly showing the army repelling an attempted Hay'at Tahrir al-Sham assault on the town of Qasabiyeh. The Syrian and Russian air forces resumed airstrikes on rebel targets, and, in response to Syrian military attacks on Turkish observation posts in Idlib, the Turkish military retaliated by firing artillery at pro-government positions, despite Russian statements of denying the Syrian government's attacks on Turkish positions.

On 15 June, pro-government forces attempted to recapture the two villages acquired by rebel factions during the previous week. They were met with stiff resistance and the ensuing clashes resulted in the death of 35 combatants, including 26 Syrian Army servicemen, 8 of whom were killed in a large mine explosion.

==== Syrian–Turkish skirmishes and entry of the Republican Guard ====
On 16 June, the Turkish Government said the Syrian Government attacked another one of its observation posts with mortar fire. The Turkish government reported no casualties and did not specify when the shelling occurred, but threatened to "put them [the Syrian government] in their place". The Turkish defence ministry reported that Turkish military units stationed in the observation posts retaliated to the reported attack by shelling government-controlled positions with heavy weapons. Rebel forces targeted the town of Mhardeh with missiles and heavy artillery. The Syrian Army reportedly received reinforcements, which included units belonging to the Syrian Republican Guard. Liwa al-Quds also sent reinforcements to the frontlines, possibly including former Syrian rebels that joined pro-government military units as part of reconciliation deals with the government.

On 17 June, the Turkish and Russian defence ministers spoke and discussed the offensive. No concrete measures were announced. The Russian and Syrian air forces, which had until that point continually bombed rebel targets, once again ceased conducting airstrikes. The halting of the air campaign was likely associated with a resumption of ceasefire talks between Russia and Turkey.

On 18 June, rebel forces attacked government-held areas near Tell Malah. The ensuing battle resulted in 89 rebel fighters killed and 41 government soldiers killed. Syrian state media stated the attack was repelled by the Syrian Army. The Russian Air Force resumed airstrikes against rebel targets. The rebel forces launched an offensive in Qasabiyah (Southern Idlib) against Syrian Army Forces. According to a source the attack was beaten back with the rebels numbering 25–35 casualties and 7 vehicles lost.

On 19 June, the Syrian Air Force also resumed bombing rebel positions. The Syrian Army, having received reinforcements, reportedly prepared to launch another push aiming not only to recapture the recently lost villages of Tell Malah and Jibeen, but also to push deeper into rebel-held territory and secure the eastern flank of Kafr Nabudah.

On 20 June, heavy clashes were reported between pro-government and rebel forces near the disputed village of Tell Malah. The Syrian Observatory for Human rights reported that more than 41 pro-government and 89 rebel fighters had been killed by that point since 18 June. The Syrian Army was able to successfully advance to the outskirts of Jibeen, but later withdrew after sustaining casualties which put the sustainability of the attack in danger. During the Syrian government and Russian advance against the rebels, losses were reported among pro-government forces including Russian sponsored militias before ultimately being repelled by rebel forces on the axis of Jibrin. During the failed advance, a group of pro-government forces were killed after entering a minefield and a BMP was destroyed.

On 27 June, the Rouse the Believers Operations Room's special forces unit carried out a raid against the Syrian Army, reportedly killing 23 soldiers, however, a government source denied the death toll was as high as the rebels stated. A second raid was carried out by Hay'at Tahrir al-Sham targeting Army positions as well. On the same day the Syrian military shelled a Turkish observation post in Idlib resulting in one Turkish soldier killed and three Turkish soldiers being injured, following the attack Turkish military helicopters were reportedly spotted over the area.

On 28 June, heavy fighting erupted between the Syrian Army and rebel groups after government forces heavily bombarded rebel positions. The clashes lasted throughout the day and resulted in over 100 total casualties, with over 51 pro-government and 45 rebel fighters killed. Turkish forces shelled government-held villages in response to reported pro-government shelling of a Turkish military observation post, which was reported by Turkey to have led to the death of a Turkish soldier. Russian President Vladimir Putin stated that the situation was "under control".

On 1 July, pro-government media reported that a potential future Syrian Army assault on the mountain town of Kabani might involve the Syrian Republican Guard, which would mark the first time the elite unit would be involved in the offensive. The report came shortly after the Syrian Air Force launched multiple air strikes followed by surface-to-surface missiles on rebel positions in and around the town.

On 3 July, over 15 National Front for Liberation (NFL) fighters were reportedly killed in an airstrike launched against an underground rebel base by the Russian air force, after the NFL attempted to infiltrate Syrian Army and NDF positions near Kabani.

On 5 July, reinforcements from Hezbollah and the 4th Armored Division commanded by Maher al-Assad began arriving in northern Hama, as part of a switch of strategy by Russia and the Syrian government dissatisfied with the current rate of progress in the offensive against the rebel-held areas in northern Syria along with other Iranian sponsored militias, to replace exhausted units such as the Tiger Forces.

On 9 July, the jihadist coalition Rouse the Believers Operations Room launched an attack on some positions of the Syrian army in the Jabal al-Turkman area, northeastern countryside of Latakia, and managed to make some progress. Pro-government units attacked included the Border Guard's 11th Regiment, local NDF, Syrian Social Nationalist Party (SSNP) militias, and the 144th Brigade of the 4th Corps’ 2nd Division; at least 40 pro-government fighters were killed and three captured.

On 10 July, the rebel groups captured Hamamiyat village and its hill. But the next day, the rebel groups retreated from those sites after an intense bombardment, followed by a ground attack from the Syrian Army. Reports indicate 56 rebel deaths.

On 12 July, Hezbollah announced that it was reducing its presence in Syria, stating that their presence was no longer necessary, as according to them the Syrian Army had recovered.

=== Renewed Army offensive ===
Between 13 and 17 July, the Syrian Army sent major reinforcements to the Al-Ghab Plain, reportedly including elite 4th Armoured Division, Tiger Forces and Republican Guard units, in a move several sources described as a preparation for a government attack across the rebel-held side of the plain. Rebel forces were reported to have demolished the last remaining bridges in the area in preparation for a government offensive.

During the evening of 17 July, the Syrian Army launched the second phase of their offensive, after a one-month pause, conducting heavy air-strikes on rebel positions near Sirmaniyah and Kabani on the Zuwayqat Mountain, which overlooks the northern Al-Ghab Plain. The Russian air force also launched strikes. The Syrian and Russian armed forces reported destroying 7 rebel bases. Clashes took place between the two sides, but the Syrian army had not reported any advances.

The Turkish-backed National Front for Liberation also reported that they had spotted Russian special forces fighting alongside the Syrian Army during ground operations, which they stated was the reason rebel forces lost the village of Hamamiyyat the previous week. Russia denied the reports.

By 20 July, the amount and intensity of Russian and Syrian air and artillery strikes on rebel-held territories had increased significantly. The Syrian government reported destroying several HTS training camps, as well as numerous vehicles belonging to Jaysh al-Izza. The pro-opposition Syrian Observatory for Human Rights reported that by that point over 58,000 air and ground strikes had been carried out by pro-government forces against rebel targets, since the initial start of the offensive.

==== Attempted rebel attack on Qasabiyeh ====
On 21 July, the Russian and Syrian air forces were reported to have conducted the largest air raid targeting a single location in 2019, by launching over 30 missiles against HTS sites in the rebel-held town of Khan Shaykhun. Syrian state media reported that the Syrian army had repelled an attempted rebel advance on the village of Qasabiyeh in southern Idlib, adding that the Syrian army had destroyed at least two rebel armored vehicles used in the assault. It also reported that the Syrian Army had killed numerous rebel fighters, including several suicide bombers. Rebel forces reported killing several SAA servicemen and seizing their weapons during the attack on Qasabiyeh. The Russian Sputnik news agency reported that over 40 rebel fighters had been killed in the attack, while an unnamed military source told Al-Masdar News that the rebel death toll was "above ten". Pro-opposition media outlets reported that over 20 Syrian Army soldiers had been killed in the assault. The local council of the mostly abandoned rebel-held town of Kafr Nabl, which had at that point been under the control of Hay'at Tahrir al-Sham for several years, reported that "everything [in the town] had been destroyed and burnt" during the bombardments. Russia had recently issued a "stark warning" to the rebel forces in control of the town of the small town, stating they were using it to stage false-flag chemical attacks, as well as a launching ground for missiles targeting government-controlled areas.

On 22 July, Jaysh al-Izza destroyed a Syrian army tank in the northern Hama countryside with an anti-tank guided missile, that was reportedly supplied by Turkey. The same day, a major government air attack targeted a popular market in Ma‘arrat al-Nu‘man, including a later "double tap" strike targeting rescue efforts, leading to the death of at least 43 civilians and injury of 109, according to a 2020 UN report.

On 24, 25 and 26 July, rebel forces started a major bombardment campaign against government-held towns, villages and military positions. The government-controlled towns of Masyaf, Tell Salhab, Shathah, Mahardah, Qamhana, as well as Jabel Ramleh airport and camp Jurin were all hit by rebel Grad missiles and heavy artillery.

==== UN report on violence in Idlib ====
On 26 July, UN High Commissioner for Human rights Michelle Bachelet reported that at more than 450 civilians had been killed during the previous 10 days and attributed 103 of those deaths to airstrikes. She condemned the destruction of several civilian facilities by government bombardments and stated that any commander that orders attacks with disregard for civilian property, or targets it intentionally, would be held liable for war crimes. At the same time she also said she was also investigating criminal rebel attacks on civilians, noting that at least 11 civilians had been killed in three days by rebel bombardments on Masyaf and Hama, as well as on residential neighbourhoods of Aleppo.

On 27 July, opposition factions reported bombing more government-controlled positions with GRAD missiles. Government forces significantly increased their artillery, missile and air attacks levied against rebel forces in response, striking dozens of rebel positions numerous times within a just a few hours. Pro-government media reported this to be the prelude to a ground operation, which would start "in the coming days".

=== Army counteroffensive ===
By nightfall on 28 July, following an intense exchange of bombardment from both sides, the Syrian Army, spearheaded by the Tiger Forces and backed by the National Defence Forces, launched a ground offensive against the opposition groups. The Syrian Army captured the villages of Tell Malah and Jubbayn in the early hours of 29 July, after heavy fighting with rebel forces, with the rebels later withdrawing. This marked a complete reversal of all rebel gains made during the offensive.

The Syrian Army, supported by artillery and missile strikes, attempted to advance toward and capture Kabani, but withdrew after several hours of heavy fighting with rebel forces. During the government's capture of the villages, government forces reportedly suffered several casualties, including the deaths of senior officers from the Republican Guard and Tiger Forces.

On 30 July, government forces made another attempt to advance on the mountain village, but were repelled after taking on numerous casualties. A source within the Republican Guard was reported by Al-Masdar News to have stated that the Syrian Government intends to expand the scope of offensive operations to include the Aleppo Governorate. The source added that the Syrian Army had managed to inflict "heavy losses" on Hay'at Tahrir al-Sham and Jayish al-Izza forces the previous day. Al-Masdar also reported that, following the capture of Tell Malah and Jubbayn, the road between Al-Suqaylabiyah and Mahardah had been successfully reopened by the government. Rebel forces reported that government airstrikes against rebel targets had continued intensifying, with one opposition monitor defining it as the heaviest bombardment since the start of the offensive. By nightfall, the Syrian Army had started advancing toward the rebel-held village of Al-Zakah, encountering resistance from HTS fighters.

On 31 July, the Syrian army captured the small town of Abu Rai’dah as well as the farms to the south of Zakah. This marked the first time since June that government forces captured territory that was under rebel control prior to the beginning of the offensive. Following the advance, the Syrian Army had positioned itself 3 kilometers from the Jaysh al-Izza stronghold of Kafr Zita and 4 kilometers from the strategic rebel-held town of Al-Lataminah.

On 1 August, the Syrian army managed to capturе the two villages to the west of Zaka – Hasrayah and Al-Sharqiyah. In addition, the army established control over several hilltops, following which it started advancing on the rebel-held village of Arbaeen.

=== Failed fourth ceasefire ===
By evening on 1 August, the Syrian government had agreed to halt the offensive in exchange for the full implementation of the original demilitarization agreement. It announced that it would cease military operations within the demilitarized zone from midnight, stating that the truce would fully enter into force if all heavy weapons and designated radical groups (such as Hay'at Tahrir al-Sham) withdraw 20 kilometers from the start of the demilitarized zone. This mirrored another demand present in the original demilitarization agreement struck the previous year. The Syrian government stated that the withdrawal of all rebel heavy and medium weapons within the DMZ would be a prerequisite for the full cessation of all air and artillery strikes against rebel forces. The original Idlib demilitarization agreement had already mandated that rebel groups withdraw all heavy and medium weapons from the zone, but the withdrawal was never accomplished. The conditional ceasefire reportedly came as a result of the Astana talks between Turkey, Russia and Iran. A top Iranian diplomat said that the truce would not apply to 'terrorist' groups (although he did not say which groups would be defined as such).

By midnight the truce had entered into effect, leading the Syrian and Russian air forces to cease conducting airstrikes against rebel targets. Rebel forces nevertheless targeted several government positions with Grad missiles and ATGMs, leading to at least 3 deaths in the government-held village of Beshlama, near the town of Qardaha. Government forces did not shell rebel positions during the morning, although by noon on 2 August artillery and missile strikes against rebel targets had resumed. Hay'at Tahrir al-Sham agreed to abide by the terms of the ceasefire, but warned that they would attack if even a single shell landed within their controlled territory. The Russian defence ministry stated that Turkey would have 24 hours to withdraw "weapons and militants" from the demilitarized zone, as well as reopen the M4 and M5 highways. The Syrian Observatory for Human Rights reported that not a single air raid had been conducted by Russia or the Syrian Government on 2 August and added that while the two sides had exchanged artillery shelling, the agreement had succeeded in "reducing violence" in the region. The Syrian Government announced that it "would not wait forever" for the Turkish Government to fulfil its obligations under the agreement.

On 3 August 24 hours after the implementation of the ceasefire agreement in the "de-escalation" zone heavy shelling was still ongoing. Violent clashes erupted between the Syrian army and rebel factions in the eastern countryside of Idlib, in an attempt by the army to infiltrate rebel positions. Rebel forces said to have repelled the infiltration attempt. The Syrian Army targeted Jayish al-Izza and Hay'at Tahrir al-Sham positions near the rebel-held towns of Kafr Zita, Al-Lataminah, as well as the contested village of al-Zakah with missiles and heavy artillery. Despite the shelling, the army did not attempt to advance on the village and the pro-government air forces remained grounded.

==== Hay'at Tahrir al-Sham rejects withdrawal ====
By the end of the day, Hay'at Tahrir al-Sham (HTS) leader Abu Mohammad al-Julani announced that the group would categorically refuse to leave the demilitarized zone, adding to his statement that "We [HTS] will not change our position, neither at the request of our friends or our enemies". The full withdrawal of HTS, alongside other radical groups, from the demilitarized zone was one of the key demands of the conditional truce, as well as the original 2018 demilitarization agreement, and as such was given 24 hours to leave the zone by the Russian Ministry of Defence. The announcement of the group's rejection of the government's demands led pro-government media to report that the Syrian Army would likely call off the ceasefire and resume offensive operations. The Russian government reported that rebel groups had breached the ceasefire regime in the demilitarized zone twice in a 24-hour period.

On 4 August, the SOHR reported the fall of several shells launched by the government forces targeting the village Al-Zakat and surroundings of the towns of Murak and Lataminah in the northern countryside of Hama. But other than that, a cautious calm remainеd the master of situation in the "de-escalation" zone, where the Russian and Syrian warplanes continued to be absent from the skies. Similarly, Reuters reported that there were no warplanes, but continued shelling by both sides.

=== Renewed ground operations ===
On 5 August, two pro-government fighters were killed by rebel snipers near the government-held village of Zilaqiat. Later that day, following Hay'at Tahrir al-Sham's categorical refusal to leave the demilitarized zone (which was one of the main demands of the conditional ceasefire), the Syrian Ministry of Defense announced the end of the ceasefire and a resumption of military operations against rebel forces. Following this announcement, the Syrian and Russian Air Forces resumed targeting rebel forces with airstrikes.

On 6 August, two ambushes in the northern parts of the Hama Governorate in rebel-held areas were suspected to have been carried out by Special operations forces. During the first ambush Suqour al-Sham was targeted, reportedly resulting in the death of 14 fighters belonging to the group, and the second ambush targeting Hurras al-Deen which was repelled with no casualties or injuries reported.

On 7 August, the Syrian army managed to capturе the two villages Al-Zakah and Arbain in northern Hama. Following the attack, the Syrian Army had positioned itself on the outskirts of Kafr Zita and reportedly managed to cut the supply route between it and the neighbouring rebel-held town of Al-Lataminah.

On 8 August, the Syrian army managed to capturе the villages of al-Sakhr and al-Jaysat in northern Hama, at the administrative border with Idlib province, and by doing so approached the town of al-Habit in southern Idlib. Subsequently, the Syrian Army also captured several grain silos, as well as the large Tell Sakhr hilltop overlooking Kafr Nabudah, after heavy fighting with Jaysh al-Izza.

At dawn on 9 August, following intense airstrikes, the Syrian Army reportedly attacked rebel forces stationed at the mountain 'fortress' of Kabani, entering into combat with HTS and the Turkistan Islamic Party. By late afternoon, the Syrian Army had reported no advances, despite reports indicating that the two sides were still engaged in combat by that point and had sustained casualties. The Syrian Army also reportedly made two unsuccessful attempts to advance toward the rebel-held village of Al-Hobeit, prompting heavy clashes between the army and the armed opposition groups in control of the village.

On 10 August, the Syrian army captured parts of the village of Sukayk, as well as its nearby hilltop of Tal Sukayk. As a result of this advance the Syrian army positioned itself closer to the town Al-Tamanah. Later that day the Syrian army managed to capture the town of Mughar Al-Hamam, located northwest of the town of al-Habit. The Army also continued its slow attack on the mountain town of Kabani, reportedly managing to seize several of its surrounding hills after clashing with rebel forces. Following its advance, the Syrian Army had reportedly come within 2 hills from the entrance of the town, that had previously long resisted all attempts at capturing it.

==== Capture of al-Habit ====
On 11 August, the Syrian army captured the strategic town of al-Habit after heavy fighting with HTS and Jayish Al-Izza forces. The Syrian Observatory for Human Rights described the capture of the town as the most significant government gain of the offensive up to that point. In addition to having a pre-war population of over 10,000 residents, the town is also dubbed "the gateway to Khan Shaykhun", a large opposition stronghold and key control point over the vital M5 highway, which linked Aleppo to Damascus prior to being taken over by rebel forces during the earlier stages of the Syrian Civil War. Later that day, the Syrian Army established full control over of Sukayk after beating back rebel forces, which were contesting the village. The National Front for Liberation announced the death of three of its commanders during clashes with the Syrian Arab Army in southern Idlib and northern Hama. On the same day Hay'at Tahrir al-Sham announced it had repelled a Syrian army assault in Latakia, during which Syrian soldiers were killed.

On 12 August, the Syrian Army advanced toward the mountain town of Kabani despite not entering it, capturing the final two hills before the entrance to the rebel stronghold. Control over the strategic hills surrounding Kabani previously gave rebel forces a major defensive advantage, which they had used to repel multiple past Syrian Army assaults on the town. On the same day the Turkish military began sending reinforcements to the Turkish observation post in Murak.

On 13 August, a rebel group released cellphone footage on social media, in which it beheaded two recently captured Syrian Army servicemen in northeastern Latakia.

==== Army advance towards Khan Shaykhun ====
On 13–14 August, the Syrian Army captured the villages of Kafr Ein, Umm Zaytuna, Kharbat Murshed, Mintar, Tel A’as and its hill west of the city of Khan Shaykhun, one of the largest rebel strongholds in Idlib. Following this advance, the Syrian Army came within 4 km of the western neighbourhoods of the city, after previously coming within 6–7 km of its eastern side following the capture of Sukayk. The two-pronged army advance placed not only the city, but the entire rebel-held area, which also includes Kafr Zita, Al-Lataminah and Murak, at major risk of encirclement. By evening on 14 August, the rebel "Fatah al-Mubin Operations Room" announced that it had shot down a Syrian Air Force Su-22 over the rebel-held town of Al-Tamanah, just east of Khan Shaykhun. The warplane had been undertaking a bombing run against rebel positions at time it was shot down. The jet's pilot was able to successfully eject from the falling aircraft and survive the landing, but was captured by Hay'at Tahrir al-Sham fighters soon after. By nightfall on the same day, the Syrian Army had successfully captured the villages of Kafr Tab and Abdin north of al-Habit at the western outskirts of the city Khan Shaykhun. The resulting advance led the Syrian Army to come even closer to an envelopment of Khan Shaykhun, as the villages are located in the town's immediate vicinity.

In the early hours of 15 August, the Syrian Army attempted to advance toward and capture the key hilltop of Tell Tari, but withdrew following several hours of heavy fighting, after encountering stiff resistance from the Rouse the Believers Operations Room. By noon the same day, the Syrian Army had captured the villages of Hasrah, Abdin and Maghar Hantah, as well as the farms near Zaitouneh, from rebel forces.

The rebel launched a new counter-offensive to retake the areas they lost to the Syrian Army at the Sukayk front in southern Idlib. Led by Hay'at Tahrir al-Sham and the Rouse the Believers Operations Room, they began their counter-offensive in southern Idlib by pushing the army from the large hilltop of Tal Tari to the town of Sukayk. Later then launched a suicide attack at the Sukayk axis and said that it had destroyed at least one Syrian Army tank and a BMP-2 Infantry fighting vehicle, as well as killed several pro-government (including Hezbollah) fighters. However, following a couple hours of intense clashes, the rebels were forced to withdraw from the outskirts of Sukayk after suffering a large number of casualties at the hands of the Syrian Army's 5th Corps and Republican Guard.

By the end of the day, the Turkish-backed Free Syrian Army announced that it had held a meeting with the rebel National Front for Liberation, in which the two groups agreed to coordinate a new axis in their fight against the Syrian Government, as well as to send major reinforcements to the front lines. The TFSA factions of Ahrar al-Sharqiya, 3rd corps and the Hamza Division expressed willingness to send more of their fighters to join in the battle.

On 16 August, the Syrian Army captured the village of Madayah and the hilltop Tal Al-Arjahi in its vicinity and in doing so established control over the northwestern flank of Khan Shaykhun. Later that day, a pro-government airstrike, probably Russian, targeted an IDP camp near Haas in rural southern Idlib, killing 20 people, mainly women and children, according to a 2020 UN report.

By late 16 and early 17 August, Ahrar al-Sharqiya and the Turkish-backed Free Syrian Army sent considerable reinforcements to the frontlines, including a large number of fighters from the Turkish-held regions of Northern Syria. Following this, rebel forces launched another heavy attack on the government-held village of Sukayk. The rebels reported destroying a Syrian Army tank, with Ansar al-Tawhid announcing that they had regained some 'points' around Sukayk. However, the rebel groups were reportedly forced to retreat after encountering Syrian Army resistance. Rebel casualties in the two attempted assaults on Sukayk were reported to have surpassed 70, by pro-government outlets.

During clashes with government forces the HTS-affiliated Ebaa News Agency claimed responsibility for an HTS SVBIED in the town of Madaya in the southern Idlib countryside which was recently taken by the Syrian government, the Ebaa News Agency released photos and video footage from a drone following the vehicle and its explosion in the town targeting pro-government forces.

By nightfall, the Syrian Army had advanced toward Khan Shaykhun, capturing the city's farms and later moving toward the nearby village of Rakaya and the hilltop of Tell Nar, located to the city's northwest. The army captured the hilltop shortly thereafter.

On 18 August, the Syrian Army came within 1 kilometre of western side of Khan Shaykhun. As a result, fierce fighting between pro-government and rebel forces, over 108 fighters were reported to have been killed on 18 August alone.

=== Capture of Khan Shaykhun and Turkish convoy attack ===
On 19 August, the Syrian Army, once again spearheaded by the Tiger Forces, began its assault on Khan Shaykhun, one of the largest rebel strongholds in the rebel-held Idlib Governorate. By morning, the army had captured the al-Faqir checkpoint at the entrance to the city and began establishing control over its outer neighbourhoods. The army also finished securing all of the town's farms and was reportedly able to cut off all of the town's supply lines. By noon, it attacked the strategic hilltop of Tell Nimr, which overlooks the key M5 highway, reportedly in a bid to stop Turkey from sending reinforcements or supplies to the embattled city.

On the same day, the 28-vehicle Turkish military convoy headed towards Khan Shaykhun through the M5 highway was targeted by Syrian warplanes multiple times. The airstrikes resulted in casualties among the rebel forces that were accompanying the convoy, reportedly killing a Faylaq al-Sham commander. The convoy was halted as a result of the airstrikes. The Turkish Defence ministry condemned the airstrike, stating that they viewed it as a violation of Russian-Turkish memorandum and that the convoy had only been transporting supplies to the Turkish observation posts in Idlib. Syria rejected the Turkish statement, stating that the convoy had been carrying weapons and ammunition bound for various rebel groups engaged in battle with the government.

By afternoon, the Syrian Army had seized the hilltops of Tal Nimr (Tiger Hill), the nearby hill of Tal Syriatel, as well the area of Wadi al-Fateh to the northwest of Khan Shaykhun, effectively blocking the M5 highway entirely. By nightfall, the army had taken control of the Khan Shaykhun portion of the M5 highway. Shortly before midnight, the Syrian Army was reported to have taken control of the city's eastern and northern districts.

During the early hours of 20 August, several rebel groups reportedly completely withdrew from the towns of Kafr Zita, Lataminah and Morek as well as their surrounding villages, thus abandoning the biggest rebel base in north Hama province. Shortly thereafter, Hay'at Tahrir al-Sham announced that it was leaving Khan Shaykhun, in what the group dubbed a "redeployment" of its forces following intense government bombardments. The group stated that their withdrawn fighters would be moving south (toward Kafr Zita, Lataminah and Murak) and would continue fighting. The Syrian Army initially denied having control of the town, but was reported as having occupied it later during the day, following the HTS withdrawal. The prospect of the Syrian Army potentially capturing the entire At-Lataminah-Kafr Zita-Murak pocket placed the Turkish observation post at Murak in a difficult situation. The Turkish foreign minister reported that Turkey had no intention of abandoning the observation post, while the Syrian Observatory for Human Rights reported that its fate remained unknown at that time.

On the same day, the Syrian army fully secured the town Khan Shaykhun after capturing the strategic hill Tell al-Tara and Al-Khazanat Camp at the southern Idlib. Thus, the Syrian army encircled and imposed a siege on the remaining rebel-held towns and villages in the northern countryside of Hama, as well as the Turkish observation post near Murak.

On 22 August, the Syrian Government announced that it had opened a 'humanitarian corridor', which would allow civilians trapped in the besieged rebel pocket to safely evacuate into government-held territories. Syrian state media reported that the Syrian army had attacked various HTS positions near Khan Shaykhun and Al-Tamanah. On the same day, the Syrian army took control of the village Al-Sayyad and hilltops Tal al-Sayyad, Tall Abu Yazid, Tal Huwayz in addition to some other locations along the Hama-Idlib axis south of the newly captured town Khan Shaykhun.

=== Army captures rebel pocket, surrounds Turkish observation post ===
Finally, on 23 August, Syrian Government forces captured the entire northern Hama pocket, composed of the towns of Morek, Kafr Zita, Al-Lataminah, around ten villages and the archaeological site of Tell Afis. Following the capture of the pocket, the Syrian Army fully surrounded the Turkish observation point at Morek. The Turkish Foreign Minister denied that the observation post had been placed in a state of siege and said that the Turkish Armed Forces would not leave the observation post.

On 26 August, the Syrian Army sent a considerable amount of reinforcements, including a large number of tanks, to join in an offensive against the rebel-held town of Kabani.

On 27 August, the Rouse the Believers Operations Room launched a new offensive in southern Idlib targeting the Syrian Army's positions near the town of Atshan at the Tal Maraq axis. The Syrian Army reported repelling the attack shortly thereafter. Rebel forces reported taking over the villages of al-Salloumiyah, Sham al-Hawa, Tell Maraq and Al-Jaduiyah later in the day. The SOHR reported that the rebel groups had captured al-Sullaumiyah and Abu Omar and made some advances on Sham al-Hawa, while violent clashes over the rest of the villages continued. Hours later, the SOHR reported that the rebel groups had withdrawn from all the positions where they had advanced earlier in the day in the southeastern countryside of Idlib.

By nightfall on 28 August, the Syrian Army (with the involvement of both the Tiger Forces and the Republican Guard) marched north and managed to capture the villages of Al-Khaween, Zarzur, Tell Aghbar and several farms near the rebel-held town of Al-Tamanah, with pro-government forces starting to advance on the town itself. A UN spokesperson reported that satellite imagery had shown that entire towns and villages had been razed to the ground as a result of recent fighting.

On 29 August, the Syrian army captured the town of Al-Tamanah.

On 30 August, the Syrian Ministry of Defense reported that the army had captured the villages and hills of Tall Ghubar, As Saqiyat, Tall Saqiyat, Tall Turki, Tall Seyed Ali and Tall Sayyed Jaafar, in addition to confirming its control over the villages captured during the previous few days. The Syrian army also engaged in fierce fighting with HTS and TIP forces, while attempting to advance on the rebel-held mountain stronghold of Kabani, but was unable to secure any serious territorial gains on that axis.

=== Final ceasefire ===
By noon on 30 August, the Syrian government declared that it would launch a unilateral ceasefire within the demilitarization zone (although much of the zone was by then under government control, as a result of government gains made during the offensive) starting from 31 August.

On 31 August, the SOHR reported that both the Syrian and Russian Air Forces had ceased conducting airstrikes (which they had previously conducted continuously), noting that while Russian reconnaissance aircraft were spotted observing rebel positions, no air attacks took place. The Syrian air force remained grounded. The SOHR further added that no offensive operations took place by noon on that day, with only 8 random shells landing within the entirety of the demilitarized zone.

On 31 August, the United States Central Command confirmed that it had launched strikes on "al-Qaeda in Syria (AQ-S)" in Idlib during the offensive, targeting their leadership. The SOHR stated the same day that over 51 Islamist militants had been killed by the American strikes, including several leaders. The SOHR further stated that the target of the strikes was the headquarters of the Guardians of Religion Organization, an HTS ally and Al-Qaeda affiliate.

== Aftermath ==
On 24 September, the Observatory reported that the first Syrian Army-rebel forces ground clash had taken place on the 25th day of the ceasefire. The clashes resulted in 6 total casualties and a minor local advance of pro-government forces, which took positions next to a hill. No military push was observed and the Observatory reported that, aside from a few strikes on rebel forces carried out by government helicopters and artillery, a 'cautious and relative' calm had settled into what was left of the Idlib demilitarized zone.

However, a 2020 UN report found that air strikes targeting localities in Idlib and Ladhiqiyah continued throughout September and October and intensified in November and December, before full hostilities resumed in December. Four medical facilities were damaged in Jisr al-Shughur, Kafr Nubl and Ariha in southern Idlib, during 4–6 November. On 6 November, pro-government forces carried out two air strikes on the Ikhlas maternity and paediatric hospital in Shinan, south of Ariha, and a series of air strikes on a surgical "cave" hospital in Kafr Nubl. On 20 November 16 civilians, including 11 children, were killed and 30 were injured when pro-government surface-to-surface cluster munitions hit an IDP camp at Qah village, near the Turkish border, a probable war crime according to the UN. HTS also committed probable war crimes in this period, including a rocket attack on Aleppo neighbourhoods on 21 November and attacks on civilian opposition activists in Kafr Takharim on 7 November.

== Reactions ==
=== Supranational ===
- United Nations − the United Nations Secretary-General António Guterres called for "an urgent de-escalation". The UN reported that over 152,000 people in Idlib were displaced since late April, since the leadup to the offensive. The United Nations Security Council scheduled a closed-door meeting to discuss the offensive on Friday (10 May), at the initiative of Germany, Belgium and Kuwait. The United Nations Human Rights Council issued a statement welcoming the ceasefire proclaimed by the Syrian Army on 18 May, while still criticising both parties to the conflict and calling them to "do everything feasible not to put civilians in harm’s way".
- Non-Aligned Movement – During its July 2019 summit, the non-aligned movement criticized the U.S. policy toward Syria, among others, and called for an end to the unilateral economic sanctions, which had been applied to the country since the beginning of the Syrian civil war and tightened after the start of the offensive.

=== National ===
- France − French President Emmanuel Macron expressed "great concern" for the escalation of violence and urged the parties to find a UN-brokered political solution.
- Germany − Germany's deputy foreign ministry spokesman Christofer Burger condemned the escalation of violence in Idlib saying, "We condemn heavy bombings that targeted the humanitarian infrastructure," adding that some of the facilities targeted in the airstrikes received German funding, and that they were reportedly hit with barrel bombs, Burger also stated "Any military action [against terrorist groups] must be in compliance with international law, the civilian population must be protected,".
- Russia − Russian foreign minister Sergey Lavrov stated that "most of Idlib is controlled by terrorist groups, which are continuing to target civilians and carrying out provocations against the Syrian Army, which cannot be allowed", adding that he thought "the nest of terrorists [in Idlib] must be uprooted". On 31 May, after renewed ceasefire negotiations fell apart, the Russian government stated that the "responsibility to stop rebels in Syria's Idlib province from firing on civilian and Russian targets" was in Turkish hands and blamed Turkey for "not holding up its side of the bargain".
- Turkey – The Turkish minister of defense, Hulusi Akar stated that Syrian forces should withdraw to areas agreed upon in the Astana Agreement, he also said that the offensive was creating a catastrophic humanitarian crisis. Akar called upon Russia to halt the government's offensive by saying, "We expect Russia to take effective and determined measures to make regime forces stop their attacks on the south of Idlib and immediately return to the borders set by the Astana agreement."
- United States – Secretary of State Mike Pompeo said regarding the offensive, "Any major operation into Idlib would be a reckless escalation of the conflict." Other US officials have said that the offensive is an 'Apocalyptic Scenario' for civilians and internally displaced people residing in the area. In June, President Trump tweeted, "The World is watching this butchery. What is the purpose, what will it get you? STOP!" United States welcomed the ceasefire, stating that it must focus on stopping attacks on civilians and civilian infrastructure.
- India – On an official visit to Damascus on 22 May, officials serving in the Indian Ministry of External Affairs published a statement in which they "reiterated the need to respect Syria’s sovereignty and territorial integrity", condemned "all forms of terrorism" and resolved to work together with Syria in the country's post-war reconstruction.
- Syria – Syria's permanent representative to the United Nations, Bashar Jaafari, stated on 23 May that the Syrian government would continue "fighting terrorism and protecting citizens from its danger". He added that the Syrian government had managed to "restore security and stability to regions which were seized by terrorist groups" and was working in coordination with the UN Special Envoy for Syria.
- Cuba – Cuban deputy foreign minister Anayansi Rodríguez Camejo affirmed "her country’s firm support to Syria in the face of terrorist eight-year war".
- China – An official visit was conducted between the Syrian Minister of Foreign Affairs and Expatriates, Walid al-Moallem and Chinese Vice President Wang Qishan in Beijing on 17 June, on the invitation of the Chinese foreign minister Wang Yi. Vice president Qishan said the People's Republic of China's commitment to the reconstruction of "what had been destroyed [in Syria] at the hands of terrorists" and affirmed China's support for Syrian sovereignty, independence and territorial integrity. He added that China categorically rejects any foreign interference in Syria's internal affairs.
- Armenia – From 12 to 15 June, Armenia's Ambassador to Syria visited the northwestern regions of Syria, which were affected by the offensive, and met with the Governor of the Latakia Governorate, as well as representatives of local municipalities (including the Armenian-majority town of Kessab) and the Syrian Armenian community. He expressed gratitude to the Syrian Government for what he viewed as the cordiality and generosity with which it treats the Armenian community in northwestern Syria.
- Belarus – The Belarusian ambassador to Syria made a statement on the Belarusian Independence Day on 3 July, saying that Belarus had "always been standing by the Syrian people and leadership in the face of the fierce terrorist attack launched against them for several years".
- Qatar – On 3 July 2019, Qatar's deputy permanent representative to the United Nations Geneva convention Abdullah al-Nuaimi condemned the Syrian government's offensive as well as the accompanying air strikes and civilian casualties and condemned the government's violation of the de-escalation agreement.

=== Non-state organizations ===
- Catholic Church – Three Papal representatives, Dicasterial Prefect Kodwo Turkson and Syrian Apostolic Nuncio, Cardinal Mario Zenari, along with the dicasterial undersecretary, met with Syrian President Bashar al-Assad on 22 July. In the meeting, they presented the Syrian president with a letter written to him by Pope Francis, in which the latter expressed "deep concern" for the humanitarian situation in the Idlib region, as well as reiterated his support for "restoring stability in Syria" and ending the Syrian Civil War.

An NFL spokesman stated that the NFL categorically rejects any joint Russian-Turkish patrols inside the DMZ as part of any ceasefire deal, adding that they would only accept Turkish troops. The Syrian Democratic Forces/Rojava leadership has expressed a completely contrasting opinion in the past, stating that they would be ready to fight on the side of the Syrian Government against the rebel groups, which they deem to be "Turkish-backed militants", viewing them as identical to those in Afrin.

  - Al-Mu'tasim Brigade – The head of the group's political office published a series of statements condemning Saudi Arabia for a lack of action being taken against the Syrian government and the country's realignment of support in Syria for YPG. He called upon the Saudi King to give support to rebel forces in Idlib, stating, "The Kingdom of Saudi Arabia today is taking a position that is not worthy of its humanitarian and moral standing on the Syrian issue," adding, "[they] stop[ed] supporting the Syrian people in the darkest circumstances, and the Syrian north is being subjected to genocide in an attempt to eliminate the Syrian resistance and crush Sunni Arabs in Syria."
  - Al-Rahman Legion – The group released a statement with a eulogy for Abdul Basit al-Sarout praising him and Jaysh al-Izza for fighting the Syrian government, the statement also praised Sarout as a martyr.
- Hay'at Tahrir al-Sham – The group released a statement saying they would be willing to negotiate a cease-fire with the Syrian government as well as Russia and Iran.

== See also ==
- Battle of Idlib (2015)
- Northwestern Syria offensive (April–June 2015)
- Northwestern Syria offensive (October–November 2015)
- Northwestern Syria campaign (October 2017 – February 2018)
- Northwestern Syria offensive (2019–2020)
- 2024 Syrian opposition offensives
- Operation Dawn of Freedom
- Syrian–Turkish border clashes during the Syrian Civil War
