= Timeline of the Syrian civil war (May–August 2019) =

The following is a timeline of the Syrian Civil War from May to August 2019. Information about aggregated casualty counts is found at Casualties of the Syrian Civil War.

== May 2019 ==
=== 2 May ===
- Facebook shuts down 49 accounts linked to black market smuggling of ancient Syrian artifacts after a BBC investigation found smugglers were using the social network to trade looted antiquities. Traded ancient artifacts included Syrian-Roman mosaics.

=== 3 May ===
- Government forces bombed Rakaya Sijneh health centre.

=== 4 May ===
- Turkish and Syrian National Army (SNA) forces capture the villages of Maraanaz, Al-Malikiyah, and Shawarighat al Arz in the Tell Rifaat area, but later withdraw, allowing Kurdish forces to retake them.

=== 6 May ===
- The Syrian Arab Army launched a ground offensive against HTS and NFL-held areas in northern Hama and southern Idlib, after six days of intensive airstrikes on the region by the SyAAF and RuAF. The Syrian Government stated that the assault was provoked by increased rebel attacks on government-held areas originating from within the demilitarized zone. The Idlib-based rebel groups stated that they believed the goal of the offensive would be to capture the M4 and M5 highways in the Idlib Governorate.

=== 7 May ===
- Northwestern Syria offensive: The SAA captured the villages of Tel Othman, al-Bani and al-Janabara. It also targeted various Hayat Tahrir al-Sham, National Front for Liberation and Jaysh al-Izza positions with missiles and artillery. The pro-opposition Syrian Observatory for Human Rights reported that at least 69 civilians and 41 insurgents had been killed up to that point, since the beginning of the escalation. The Russian Air Force intensified airstrikes against rebel groups, in response to missiles and mortar shells, that they stated had been fired against Russia's Khmeimim Air Base the previous day by unidentified militants. The Syrian Army reported that it had killed 15 rebels in the previous day, while losing 11 servicemen.

=== 8 May ===
- Northwestern Syria offensive: Syrian Army captured the town of Kafr Nabudah after a brief battle.

=== 9 May ===
- Northwestern Syria offensive: Syrian Army captured the town of Qalaat al-Madiq as well as some surrounding villages.

=== 22 May ===
- Four Hayat Tahrir al-Sham fighters claim to have been injured by chlorine gas munitions launched by pro-government forces three days prior, on Sunday 19 May.
- The Syrian army lose Kafr Nabudah after a rebel counterattack but recaptures it on 26 May.

=== 27 May ===
- The Israeli Air Force announces destroying a Syrian air defense launcher and its operator after it says an anti-aircraft missile locked onto an Israeli plane conducting a "routine flight" over northern Israel. According to Syrian media, the strike took place near Khan Arnabah, very close to the Golan Heights border. The AA missile reportedly fell within Syrian territory.

=== 29 May ===
- At least 14 civilians are killed in air strikes by the Syrian Government and Russian forces in Idlib.

=== 30 May ===
- During continuing air strikes, five civilians including women and children are killed in Idlib.

== June 2019 ==
=== 2 June ===
Over 34 are killed and 80 are injured in the June 2019 Syria bombings.

=== 8 June ===
- Abdul Baset al-Sarout, a former Syrian football goalkeeper is killed after engaging in combat with the Syrian Army in Tell Malah during the Northern offensive.

=== 11 June ===
- Syrian Air Defences repel Israeli missiles targeting Al-Harra, near the Golan Heights.

=== 15 June ===
- Syrian State Television report wildfires spark an explosion at an ammo depot west of Damascus.

=== 16 June ===
- Rebel shelling kills 12 in a rural area in northern Aleppo.

=== 20 June ===
- Over the past 48 hours, it is reported that 84 rebels and 41 government based troops have been killed in Hama.

=== 26 June ===
- The UN questions the Russian Government in relation to 23 hospitals that have been hit by attacks since the Idlib offensive began in April.

== July 2019 ==
=== 12 July ===
On 12 July, Hezbollah announced that it was reducing its presence in Syria, stating that their presence was no longer necessary, as according to them the Syrian army had recovered.

=== 14 July ===
Turkish forces masses out near the Syrian border with the aim of launching an offensive east of the Euphrates.

== August 2019 ==
=== 1 August ===
- The Syrian Government agrees to a ceasefire in Idlib on the condition that a Turkish-Russian buffer zone deal is implemented.

=== 7 August ===
- The United States and Turkey reached a deal, which would set up a new demilitarized buffer zone in northern Syria, in order to preempt a potential Turkish invasion of SDF-held Northern Syria.

=== 12 August ===
- Syrian Government captures al-Habit during the 2019 Northwestern offensive.

=== 19 August ===
- Syrian Air Force warplanes repeatedly strike a Turkish military convoy driving through the rebel-held region of Idlib, reportedly causing several casualties and forcing it to stop. Turkey claims the convoy was aiming to supply observation posts, while Syria accuses it of carrying weapons and ammunition to rebel groups.

=== 20 August ===
- The Al-Qaeda-linked faction Hayat Tahrir al-Sham (HTS) acknowledges "a redeployment" south of the strategic town of Khan Shaykhun. Pro-Government media later reports that the Syrian Army has entered the northern sector of the town following HTS withdrawal.

=== 23 August ===
- The Syrian Army captures the entire northern Hama-southern Idlib rebel pocket, asserting control over the strategic towns of Kafr Zita, Al-Lataminah and Murak, as well as numerous villages and an archaeological site, following the withdrawal of rebel forces.
- The Turkish observation post near Murak is encircled by government forces.

=== 24 August ===
- The Damascus airstrike was conducted by the Israeli air force on late night on Sunday of 24 August to prevent an Iranian force from launching "very imminent" drone strike on Israel.

=== 27 August ===
- YPG units withdraw from Tell Abyad and Ras al-Ayn as the first stage of the Northern Syria Buffer Zone agreement enters into effect. (Reuters) (Kurdistan 24)

=== 31 August ===
- More than 40 militants are killed by an American cruise missile strike targeting al-Qaeda-linked militants at a Huras al-Din base in Syria's rebel-held Idlib Governorate. Idlib had recently agreed a truce with the Syrian government.
