= Sayad =

Sayad may refer to:

- Sayyid, an honorific title
- Sayad, Hama, a village in Kafr Zita Nahiyah, Mhardeh District, Hama, Syria
- Sayad, Azerbaijan, a village and municipality, Khachmaz District, Azerbaijan

== See also ==
- Sayyad, a village in Baghlan Province, Afghanistan
- Sayyad, Iran (disambiguation)
- Sayyad (missile), a series of surface-to-air missiles by Iran
