= Ansar al-Tawhid =

Armed Islamist group

- أنصار التوحيد
- Flag of Ansar al-Tawhid Logo of Ansar al-Tawhid
- Leaders: Abu al-Walid Saraqib †; Abu Diyab Sarmin; Khamza Al-Shishani †
- Dates active: March 2018 – 29 January 2025
- Split from: Jund al-Aqsa
- Group: Ghuraba Division
- Active regions: Syria
- Ideology: Salafi jihadism
- Status: Dissolved
- Size: 300-1,000
- Part of: Alliance to Support Islam (until 2020); Rouse the Believers Operations Room (until 2020)
- Wars: Syrian civil war: Siege of al-Fu'ah and Kafriya; Northwestern Syria offensive (April–August 2019); Northwestern Syria offensive (2019–2020); Northwestern Syria clashes (December 2022 – November 2024); 2024 Syrian opposition offensives

Ansar al-Tawhid (Arabic: أنصار التوحيد, lit. 'Supporters of monotheism') was an armed Islamist militant group fighting in the Syrian Civil War. The group was made up of former Jund al-Aqsa members. It was allied with Al-Qaeda and part of the Hurras al-Din-led Rouse the Believers Operations Room until May 2020, when it announced its departure from the coalition.

At the Syrian Revolution Victory Conference, which was held on 29 January 2025, most factions of the armed opposition, including the Ansar al-Tawhid, announced their dissolution and were incorporated into the newly formed Ministry of Defense.

== Background ==
Ansar al-Tawhid was established in March 2018 by Abu Diyab al-Sarmini. The group was based in Sarmin and Nayrab in eastern Idlib, which has a strong ISIL presence, but was also active in opposition held parts of the Latakia Governorate.

Within Ansar al-Tawhid there were members of the group who were sympathetic and supportive of ISIL, as well as members of Ansar al-Tawhid whom were reportedly linked to ISIL itself. There were also members of the group that were closer to Hay'at Tahrir al-Sham (HTS) and were linked with it and support them, as well as those who continue to hold a neutral position, much like the original Jund al-Aqsa's stance in the dispute between ISIL and other opposition and Jihadist groups like HTS. The group also includes fighters formerly part of the Turkistan Islamic Party in Syria, which itself included former Jund al-Aqsa fighters that elected to stay in Idlib in 2017 rather than leave to ISIL's capital in al-Raqqa, and fighters that refused to join Hay'at Tahrir al-Sham for ideological reasons. Ansar al-Tawhid was also believed by some to be a receptacle group for former ISIL fighters.

The group established the Alliance to Support Islam with Hurras al-Din with the stated goals of establishing Sharia law and fighting against aggressors. Though the group works closely with Hurras al-Din and was believed to have links to al-Qaeda, Ansar al-Tawhid does not consider itself to be part of al-Qaeda nor does it hold allegiance to al-Qaeda, and al-Qaeda has not acknowledged the group as being part of its global network.

The group has initiated recruitment campaigns in parts of the southern Idlib countryside and in Maarrat al-Nu'man, with the group as a whole reportedly consisting of 1,000 fighters, although sources linked with HTS claim that a majority of them were not native Syrians. The groups members were reportedly well armed with mortars, anti-aircraft guns, and armored vehicles.

== Structure ==
=== Leadership ===
The group's leader, Abu Diyab Sarmini, who originates from the town of Sarmin, was the former leader of Jund al-Aqsa (which pledged allegiance to Jabhat Fateh al-Sham for protection from Ahrar al-Sham amidst fighting between Jund al-Aqsa and Ahrar al-Sham in 2016).

Sarmini began recruiting former Jund al-Aqsa members who had joined Hay'at Tahrir al-Sham and the Turkistan Islamic Party in Syria after Jund al-Aqsa was dissolved by HTS, as well as former Jund al-Aqsa members that were wanted by HTS. Sarmini specifically recruited fighters who had remained neutral during the fighting between Ahrar al-Sham, HTS and Jund al-Aqsa to form Ansar al-Tawhid.

Prior to Ansar al-Tawhid's formation, meetings were held between Sarmini and Hay'at Tahrir al-Sham's leader, Abu Mohammad al-Julani, to convince HTS to release 5 former Jund al-Aqsa members, whom were commanders, imprisoned by HTS. In order to recruit former Jund al-Aqsa members as well as new outsiders, the group has advertised that it was similar to the original Jund al-Aqsa in regards to beliefs and ideology.

=== Media ===
The group produces videos showing its military operations and attacks as well as training camps. The videos use nasheeds produced by both ISIL and al-Qaeda and contain video montages, while being focused on the group's view of the conflict in Syria.

== History ==
After its formation the group coordinated with Hay'at Tahrir al-Sham to attack a Syrian government held enclave in two predominantly Shia villages outside of Idlib's city limits.

On 26 April 2018, Ansar al-Tawhid carried out a joint attack with Jaysh al-Izza and Hurras al-Din, which was another al-Qaeda aligned group that split off from Hay'at Tahrir al-Sham and was led by al-Nusra's former head Sharia official, Sami al-Oraydi, targeting the Syrian military and allied paramilitary groups, during the fighting casualties were reported on both sides, as well as exchanges of artillery fire. During the attack the rebel groups advanced into government held territory and temporarily held positions before being expelled later on.

In May 2018, HTS raided the headquarters of Ansar al-Tawhid in Sarmin and arrested three members from the group for having links to ISIL.

On 5 December 2018, Ansar al-Tawhid and Hay'at Tahrir al-Sham jointly repelled a Syrian government infiltration attempt in Tell Touqan.

On 3 February 2019, two of Ansar al-Tawhid's commanders were killed near the government held enclave of Fuah; one of the commanders was Turkish.

In March 2019, the group attacked two significant Syrian army checkpoints in northern Hama, claiming to have killed 40 Syrian soldiers, however only 16 were confirmed killed. During the attack the Syrian army had acknowledged an unspecified number of soldiers had been killed by Ansar al-Tawhid fighters and blamed bad weather for making the attack easier for the group. In response to the attack the Syrian military displayed corpses of fighters reportedly part of Ansar al-Tawhid who had been killed during the attacks on the checkpoints. After the attack, according to a pro-government source, the Syrian army claimed to have killed the group's deputy leader, a Chechen fighter named Khamza Shishani.

In April 2019, the group claimed responsibility for an Inghimasi attack against pro-Assad forces in northern Hama, and released photos showing fighters carrying Kalashnikov rifles mounted with night vision scopes and wearing explosive belts.

On 2 August 2019, Ansar al-Tawhid coordinated with the Turkistan Islamic Party to fire an IRAM rocket with four 122mm rockets attached at government forces.

On 17 August 2019, after a rebel counter-attack to retake the recently lost town of Sukayk from pro-government forces, the group announced to have retaken positions outside the city alongside other rebel groups, after fighting Hezbollah.

On 31 August 2019, the American-led CJTF-OIR coalition carried out missile attacks in Idlib targeting a meeting between Ansar al-Tawhid and Hurras al-Din reportedly killing a total of 40 members from both groups. After the attack the Russian military condemned the strike saying that the attack was not coordinated with Russia or Turkey and violated the terms of a cease-fire in Idlib. The attack left 30 dead including civilians, among the casualties from the attack was a 12 year old child soldier as well as a 70 year old civilian farmer.

After the coalition's attack on Ansar al-Tawhid, HTS arrested the group's religious leader Abu Hakim al-Jazrawi, and analysts have speculated this could be part of an attempt on behalf of HTS to distance itself from foreign fighters and ultimately confront groups such as Ansar al-Tawhid.

On 17 March 2020, Sputnik news reported that a source in Idlib claimed that Ansar al-Tawhid as well as the Rouse the Believers Operations Room, which Ansar al-Tawhid was part of, along with Hay'at Tahrir al-Sham and the Turkistan Islamic Party in Syria reject a Russian-Turkish cease-fire deal in Idlib after months of clashes between November 2019 and March 2020, with the deal entailing joint Russian-Turkish military patrols, and that Ansar al-Tawhid along with the other groups were also preparing to attack Russian military personnel in Idlib and patrols.

On 3 May 2020, Ansar al-Tawhid released a statement, claiming to not be affiliated with any other groups, and hold no allegiance to any other group either secretly or publicly, and also denied being part of any alliance or operations room, while also acknowledging previously being part of such entities, and also claimed they would continue to cooperate with unnamed factions when needed. It also ended its alliance with Hurras al-Din after Ansar al-Tawhid accused it of breaking the terms of their alliance.

In early December 2024, the group was active in the 2024 Syrian opposition offensives.

On 23 December 2024, members of Ansar al-Tawhid were allegedly involved in burning a Christmas tree in Suqaylabiyah, a Christian-majority town in Hama province captured by the rebels. The incident sparked protests across Syria and led to the detention of the perpetrators by Hay'at Tahrir al-Sham.

== See also ==
- List of armed groups in the Syrian Civil War
