= Udaya Kumar (director) =

Udaya Kumar PS
- Born: Udaya Kumar PS; 3 May 1986 (age 40); Kudremukha locality, Chickmagalur, Karnataka, India
- Occupations: Director, Screenwriter, Editor
- Years active: 2007 - present

Udaya Kumar P S is a Kannada film director and editor based in India, who started his career as an editor, working with Nagathihalli Chandrashekar and directed movie Kaarmoda Saridu in the year 2019, and "Bun-tea" in the year 2023.

== Early life ==
Udaya Was born in Kudremukha of Chikmagalur district. Udaya Kumar PS was born on 3 May 1986 to Subramaniyam & Devika in Kudremukh a town in Karnataka. He completed college from St. Xavier Mangalore. Completed Film Editing from TV & Film Institute.Is a full-time Film Director & Editor.

== Career ==
=== As director ===
Udaya Kumar has directed his debut in the year 2019. His first directorial Karmoda Saridu received a mixed response from the audience and critics. He has also made several short films and also won many awards with regard to the same.

=== As editor ===
Udaya Kumar started his career as an editor. He worked under the state award winner Srikanth of Ugram & KGF fame. during his work with Srikanth he has worked in famous Kannada movies like, Ishtakamya, India vs England, Khakii, Enendu hesaridali, Kaarmoda Saridu, Kirita, Vaasu pakka commercial. He has his own studio under the name of GStudio.

== Filmography ==
Year	Film	Director	Editor	Screenwriter	Awards
2019	Kaarmoda Saridu	Yes	Yes	Yes	
2019	Khakii	No	No	Yes	
2023	Buntea	Yes	Yes	Yes	Chittara Star Awards.(Best Social Impact Movie)
2026	Mr.Jack	No	Yes	No	
2026	Ananta Padmanaabha	No	Yes	No	
