= Free Palestine Movement =

Palestinian Syrian armed organization

- حركة فلسطين حرة
- Logo of the Free Palestine Movement
- Leaders: Yasser Qashlaq (political leader); Saed Abd Al-Aal (military commander)
- Dates active: c. 2003 – present
- Groups: Al-Aqsa Shield Forces; Abd al-Qadir al-Husayni Battalions; Saraya Bader
- Active regions: Palestine, Syria, Lebanon
- Ideology: Palestinian nationalism Anti-Zionism
- Wars: the Israeli–Palestinian conflict and the Syrian Civil War

The Free Palestine Movement (Arabic: حركة فلسطين حرة) is a Palestinian Syrian armed movement and community organization that is led by the businessman Yasser Qashlaq and supported the Ba'athist government of Syria. The organization opposes the existence of Israel, and was mostly known for political activism and social services in favor of Palestinians in Syria and the Gaza Strip before 2012. Upon the outbreak of the Syrian Civil War, however, the Free Palestine Movement formed its own militias and openly fought for the Ba'athist government against various rebel groups until the fall of the Assad regime in 2024.

== History ==
=== Early activities ===
The Free Palestine Movement was founded by Yasser Qashlaq, a Syria-born Palestinian businessman of considerable wealth who heads several organizations including the Lebanese Institute of International Studies, the Syrian-Palestinian Investment House, the Palestinian Businessmen's Club, and also owns a small Lebanese newspaper. He has been described as the "most famous real estate dealer in the Yarmouk Camp". According to a translation by the Middle East Media Research Institute (MEMRI), Yasser called "Israeli pirates [...] dregs of European garbage", said Israelis were a "gang of criminal murderers", and that Israeli Jews were "human pieces of filth" who should be returned "back to their own countries". According to MEMRI, he has stated that there is "no reason for coexistence" between Israelis and Palestinians and that "Gilad Shalit [should] return to Paris. Let those murderers return to Poland. Once they are back there, we will hunt them down to the end of the world, and prosecute them for their massacres". He was reportedly close to the Assad government of Syria, though denied having links with Hezbollah.

When Yasser first became politically active in the Palestinian Yarmouk Camp of Damascus in 2003, he presented himself as supporting the Second Intifada. Since then, he organized the Free Palestine Movement as community organization which provided social services for Palestinians in Syria and rallied support for the Baa'athist government. Atlantic Council researcher Tom Rollins wrote that the organization serves as "vehicle for [Yasser Qashlaq's] political ambitions". According to Qashlaq, the Free Palestine Movement took part in organizing the Freedom Flotilla II for the Gaza Strip in 2010/11. The group armed itself in 2011, with the news site Syria Indicator arguing that this was motivated by the need to suppress anti-Assad protests in the Yarmouk Camp.

=== Syrian Civil War ===
The unit uses both the flag of Palestine as well as the Ba'athist flag of Syria.

After the Syrian Civil War's start, the Free Palestine Movement began to recruit for pro-government militias and founded its own paramilitary wing, the "Al-Aqsa Shield Forces" in 2012. The Al-Aqsa Shield Forces mostly operated in Damascus, especially after an informal power-sharing agreement between the Free Palestine Movement and Fatah al-Intifada, another pro-government militia, in 2016. According to this agreement Yasser Qashlaq paid Fatah al-Intifada a substantial sum for handing over parts of their frontline at the Yarmouk Camp to the Free Palestine Movement. In consequence, Yasser and his movement could gain "valuable political capital" as defenders of Yarmouk which is of great symbolic importance to the Palestinian diaspora, while Fatah al-Intifada got much-needed funds. Since then, the Free Palestine Movement mostly fought Islamic State militants in Yarmouk Camp, notably participating in the Southern Damascus offensives of March and April and May 2018. In the latter operation the organization's military commander, Saed Abd Al-Aal, was wounded in combat. Fighters of the Free Palestine Movement have also fought in other areas of Damascus, including at Harasta in August 2017 and at al-Shaghour during the Rif Dimashq offensive of early 2018.

Though the Free Palestine Movement's activity was mostly concentrated in Damascus, the organization was known to have committed forces to fronts in other regions of Syria as well. In a notable incident in May 2013, the "Abd al-Qadir al-Husayni Battalions", another armed group affiliated with the movement, fired two mortar shells at Israel Defense Forces positions on Mount Hermon. This was reportedly done in commemoration of Nakba Day. Troops of the Free Palestine Movement also operated in Hama in late 2017, and fought in the Battle of Deir ez-Zor (September–November 2017).

After the Yarmouk Camp was fully secured by Assad government forces in May 2018, some locals started to burn down their own houses to prevent them from being looted. In response, the Free Palestine Movement declared that these people would have to account for their actions, and that it would try to prevent further burnings. The group, along with as-Sa'iqa and Fatah al-Intifada, also started to lay off many of its fighters due to the decreasing need for them and lack of funds. Commander Saed Abd Al-Aal denied this, however, and claimed that the Free Palestine Movement had simply redeployed its fighters from Damascus to other war zones. When an Irish parliamentary delegation –including Catherine Connolly– visited Yarmouk Camp in late July 2018 to evaluate the damage caused by the years-long combat, it was accompanied by Saed Abd Al-Aal. The Free Palestine Movement took part in a festival in honor of Yasser Arafat on 11 November 2018.

At some point in early 2019, the Free Palestine Movement sent detachments to take part in counter-insurgency operations in Deir ez-Zor Governorate, and contributed troops to the Northwestern Syria offensive (April–August 2019). In course of the latter campaign, its troops fought at Halfaya and al-Zakah. In October 2019, a FPM member was shot dead by unknown assailants in Da'el. Meanwhile, the FPM continued to demobilize fighters due to a lack of funds. From late 2019, the party's troops took part in the government's Northwestern Syria offensive (December 2019–March 2020). Around the same time, the Free Palestine Movement was also active in Latakia Governorate, where one of its fighters was killed at Salma. After the Northwestern Syria offensive's conclusion, the Free Palestine Movement continued to be active in Idlib, where it held border posts at the frontline. In February 2020, seven members of the group were killed during clashes in the region.

By 2021, the hashtag #freepalestine became increasingly popular in social media; the hashtag along with the slogan "Free Palestine" were used by activists as a "standalone phrase, not connected to any one movement or institution". However, The Jerusalem Post journalists Shira Silkoff and Eve Young argued that the existence of the Free Palestine Movement of Syria resulted in "many" regarding the slogan "Free Palestine" as "a call to violent resistance against the State of Israel as a Jewish state".

In December 2023, the Free Palestine Movement organized a "solidarity stand" in the Yarmouk Camp to protest against the Israeli invasion of the Gaza Strip. Other Syrian Palestinian individuals and representatives such as several Palestine Liberation Army officers and PPSF leader Khalid ʽAbd al-Majid also took part in the protest.

=== Post-Assad activity ===
After the fall of the Assad regime in late 2024, the Syrian transitional government demanded that all Palestinian armed groups in Syria disarm themselves, dissolve their military formations, and instead focus on political and charitable work. The Free Palestine Movement responded by resuming its humanitarian work in Syria and disavowing several of its leaders, including Saed Abd Al-Aal and Abdul Qader Haifawi. The group claimed that these commanders had been forced onto the militia by the Assad government. According to the Action Group for Palestinians of Syria, Saed Abd Al-Aal fled to Lebanon.

Meanwhile, the Syrian transitional government began prosecuting individuals who it alleged had committed crimes during the Syrian civil war. Nidal Nimer Yousef who had held "leadership roles" in the Free Palestine Movement and other units was arrested in January 2025. A lawyer of the group was also arrested in 2026.

== Organization ==
The Free Palestine Movement is officially led by Yasser Qashlaq. According to journalist Omar Alaa Eldin, the group was provided with "funding and armament" by the Assad government. In course of the Syrian civil war, Saed Abd Al-Aal served as the commander of the organization's paramilitary wing. Saed Abd Al-Aal is the son of Muhammad Abdel-Al, a member of the leadership of the Ba'ath Party's Palestinian branch in Syria and former Yarmouk Camp official. The armed forces of the Free Palestine Movement were described as "rag-tag militia" and included the Saraya Bader, the Al-Aqsa Shield Forces as well as the Abd al-Qadir al-Husayni Battalions. Like other pro-government militias in Syria, the Free Palestine Movement reportedly attracted new recruits with relatively high monthly salaries, as many young Syrian Palestinians were in precarious economic conditions due to the civil war and mass unemployment. By November 2018, 24 fighters had died while fighting in the Syrian Civil War for the FPM. Following the fall of the Assad regime, the Free Palestine Movement attempted to distance itself from its former fighters, disavowing formerly prominent members such as Saed Abd Al-Aal and Abdul Qader Haifawi.

== Alleged criminal activities and war crimes ==
According to the pro-opposition site Zaman AlWasl and other investigators, two (ex-)members of the Free Palestine Movement, namely Mofeq AlDaouah and Mahmoud Arnaout, were involved in war crimes during the Syrian Civil War. They allegedly targeted and killed civilians during the Siege of Yarmouk Camp. In addition, Zaman AlWasl accused Mofeq of several cases of rape in Yarmouk Camp. Mofeq was nicknamed the "Butcher of Yarmouk" for his actions. After moving to Germany as a refugee, Mofeq was arrested by the German police in Berlin on 4 August 2021. He was accused of having fired an anti-tank weapon into a crowd of civilians, who were waiting for UN food handouts on 23 March 2014 in Yarmouk Camp. At least seven people were killed in the attack. In February 2023, Mofeq was sentenced to life imprisonment by a German court. In 2026, The New Arab stated that human rights monitors had implicated the Free Palestine Movement "in atrocities and starvation siege tactics against Palestinian refugees" during the civil war.

According to local activists, the Free Palestine Movement is also involved in criminal business schemes which pressured residents of Yarmouk Camp to sell property under value to make way for a major reconstruction plan of the cityscape. The militia is reportedly supported by the Al-Shihabi Contracting Company, a company accused of obtaining building materials for free at the expense of the PLO during the reconstruction of Yarmouk Camp.
