= Nqeir =

Nqeir النقير
- Village
- Location in Syria
- Coordinates: 35°29′56″N 36°32′26″E
- Country: Syria
- Governorate: Idlib
- District: Maarrat al-Nu'man District
- Subdistrict: Khan Shaykhun Nahiyah

Population (2004)
  - Total: 1,602
- Time zone: UTC+2 (EET)
  - Summer (DST): UTC+3 (EEST)
- City Qrya Pcode: C3991

Nqeir (Arabic: النقير) is a Syrian village located in Khan Shaykhun Nahiyah in Maarrat al-Nu'man District, in the southern countryside of Idlib. According to the Syria Central Bureau of Statistics (CBS), Nqeir had a population of 1602 in the 2004 census.
