= Islamist anti-Turkey groups in the Syrian civil war =

The Islamist anti-Turkey groups in the Syrian civil war were Islamist groups that fought in the Syrian civil war and opposed Turkey and its involvement in the war, as well as its allied groups. The disagreements between the Islamists about Turkey had also contributed to the inter-rebel conflict during the Syrian civil war.

== Documented groups ==
=== Islamic State ===
The Islamic State, since its foundation, was hostile to Turkey. Turkey designated the Islamic State a terrorist organization in 2014. The conflict between the Islamic State and Turkey persisted throughout the entirety of the Syrian civil war.

=== Al-Nusra Front ===
Al-Nusra Front opposed Turkey and various Turkish-backed groups. In December 2016, Al-Nusra Front raided houses throughout Idlib and captured 16 fighters from the Mountain Hawks Brigade of the Free Idlib Army. The FIA fighters were captured on charges of supporting the Turkish military intervention in Syria. In October 2014, Al-Nusra Front, alongside Jund al-Aqsa, clashed with the Syria Revolutionaries Front in Idlib, around the same time the Al-Nusra Front–SRF/Hazzm Movement conflict was going on in Aleppo. In January 2015, the conflict between Al-Nusra Front and Hazzm Movement spread from Aleppo to Idlib.

=== Ansar Abu Bakr al-Siddiq ===
Ansar Abu Bakr al-Siddiq was founded in August 2020, by Islamists who were frustrated by how most Islamist rebel groups around Idlib were supported by Turkey. Many Islamists saw Turkish presence in northwest Syria as an infidel occupation of Muslim lands that was no different from the Russian and Iranian presence in Syria. While also fighting the Assad regime and HTS, Ansar Abu Bakr al-Siddiq was also consistent in attacking Turkish soldiers and bases.

=== Jama'at Ansar al-Islam ===
Following the Turkish-Russian agreement to demilitarize Idlib in September 2018, Jama'at Ansar al-Islam joined Rouse the Believers Operations Room with other al-Qaeda-linked groups to oppose the demilitarization of northwestern Syria. After March 2019, Jama'at Ansar al-Islam began directly attacking Turkish military positions in northwestern Syria.

=== Jamaat Ansar al-Furqan in Bilad al-Sham ===
In the charter of Jama'at Ansar al-Furqan in Bilad al Sham, the group declared war on the government of Bashar al-Assad, Turkey, the Turkish-backed Free Syrian Army, Russia, Shias and atheists.

=== Al-Rahman Legion ===
In 2020, Turkey cut off all support to Al-Rahman Legion after the group refused to obey Turkey's order to send fighters into Libya. While a few militants of the group went on to fight in Libya, the commanders rejected the order and the group began opposing Turkey.

== See also ==
- Armed factions in the Syrian civil war
