= Arbain, Syria =

Arba'in الأربعين
- Town
- Location in Syria
- Coordinates: 35°21′14″N 36°33′30″E
- Country: Syria
- Governorate: Hama
- District: Mahardah
- Subdistrict: Kafr Zita

Population (2004)
  - Total: 1,400
- Time zone: UTC+3 (AST)
- City Qrya Pcode: C3462

Arba'in (Arabic: الأربعين, also spelled Arbaeen or Al-Arbaeen) is a Syrian town located in the Kafr Zita Subdistrict of the Mahardah District in Hama Governorate. According to the Syria Central Bureau of Statistics (CBS), Arba'in had a population of 1,400 in the 2004 census.

== Syrian Civil War ==
Arbain was captured by Syrian opposition forces in the first half of 2014. On August 1, 2019, the Syrian Army recaptured the settlement from Jaysh al-Izza.
