= Umm Zaytuna =

Umm Zaytuna أم زيتونة
- Village
- Location in Syria
- Country: Syria
- Governorate: Idlib
- District: Maarrat al-Nu'man District
- Subdistrict: Khan Shaykhun Nahiyah

Population (2004)
  - Total: 250
- Time zone: UTC+2 (EET)
  - Summer (DST): UTC+3 (EEST)
- City Qrya Pcode: C3988

Umm Zaytuna (Arabic: أم زيتونة) is a Syrian village located in Khan Shaykhun Nahiyah in Maarrat al-Nu'man District, Idlib. According to the Syria Central Bureau of Statistics (CBS), Umm Zaytuna had a population of 250 in the 2004 census.
