= Hbit =

Hbit الهبيط
- Town
- Location in Syria
- Coordinates: 35°26′24″N 36°32′12″E
- Country: Syria
- Governorate: Idlib
- District: Maarrat al-Nu'man
- Subdistrict: Khan Shaykhun

Population (2004)
  - Total: 10,144
- Time zone: UTC+2 (EET)
  - Summer (DST): UTC+3 (EEST)
- City Qrya Pcode: C3989

Hbit (Arabic: الهبيط, sometimes spelled Hobait, al-Hubait or al-Habit) is a Syrian town located in Khan Shaykhun Nahiyah in Maarrat al-Nu'man District, Idlib. According to the Syria Central Bureau of Statistics (CBS), Hbit had a population of 10,144 in the 2004 census. Nearby localities include Kafr Nabudah to the west, Khan Shaykhun to the east and Kafr Zita and Al-Lataminah to the southeast.

== History ==
=== Syrian Civil War ===
According to Al-Masdar News, the al-Qaeda-linked Tahrir al-Sham group had a headquarter in the village and killed 11 children. On 3 April 2017, the HQ was targeted with guided missiles fired from two Russian Sukhoi Su-25 aircraft. According to the Syrian Network for Human Rights, the children Ahmad and Mariam Abdulla al-Abood were killed by missiles fired from Russian aircraft. In the evening, Mohamed Rashid, a spokesman for the FSA-affiliated Jaysh al-Nasr ("Army of Victory") said, the "Assad regime conducted a chlorine attack" on the village but was hoax. Local activists said, "regime helicopters" dropped two containers of toxic gas on the village, killing "two children from the same family" and injured 20 more. On 11 August 2019, the Syrian army recaptured the town.
