= Kafr Ein, Idlib =

Kafr Ein, Idlib كفر عين
- Village
- Location in Syria
- Coordinates: 35°26′42″N 36°34′00″E
- Country: Syria
- Governorate: Idlib
- District: Maarrat al-Nu'man District
- Subdistrict: Khan Shaykhun Nahiyah

Population (2004)
  - Total: 1,234
- Time zone: UTC+2 (EET)
  - Summer (DST): UTC+3 (EEST)
- City Qrya Pcode: C3993

Kafr Ein, Idlib (Arabic: كفر عين) is a Syrian village located in Khan Shaykhun Nahiyah in Maarrat al-Nu'man District, Idlib. According to the Syria Central Bureau of Statistics (CBS), Kafr Ein, Idlib had a population of 1234 in the 2004 census.

== History ==
During the Syrian Civil War, in 2012 the village was captured from the Syrian government by rebel fighters. On 11 June 2019, the village was struck by Syrian Air Force jet warplanes, killing 5 civilians. On 8 July 2019, an open area outside village was struck by a Syrian Air Force bomb, narrowly missing several men. On 13 August, the Syrian army captured the village of Kafr ‘Ayn.
