= Hamamiyat =

Al-Hamamiyat الحماميات
- Village
- Location in Syria
- Coordinates: 35°23′N 36°32′E
- Country: Syria
- Governorate: Hama
- District: Mahardah
- Subdistrict: Kafr Zita
- Elevation: 255 m (837 ft)

Population (2004)
  - Total: 1,305
- Time zone: UTC+3 (AST)
- City Qrya Pcode: C3459

Al-Hamamiyat (Arabic: الحماميات) is a Syrian village located in the Kafr Zita Subdistrict of the Mahardah District in Hama Governorate. According to the Syria Central Bureau of Statistics (CBS), al-Hamamiyat had a population of 1,305 in the 2004 census. It is situated at 255 metres above sea level.
