= Southern Damascus offensive (March 2018) =

Military operation

- Part of the Syrian Civil War and the inter-rebel conflict during the Syrian Civil War
- Map of the battle
Date	12–20 March 2018 (1 week and 1 day)
Location	al-Qadam, Syria
Status	ISIL victory: ISIL takes control of 90% of al-Qadam, SAA controls one neighborhood; Rebels abandon al-Qadam

Belligerents
Islamic State of Iraq and the Levant	(Syria) Syrian Arab Republic: Syrian Armed Forces; Palestinian People's Party; Free Palestine Movement (Syrian opposition) Free Syrian Army (12 March only) Hay'at Tahrir al-Sham (12 March only)

Commanders and leaders
Unknown	(Syria) Unknown Nidal Darwish (executed)

Units involved
Dimashq Wilayah	Syrian Army: 141st Regiment; National Defence Forces Syrian Air Force

Strength
1,500–2,500	Unknown

Casualties and losses
17 killed	(Syria) 116 killed (per SOHR) (Syria) 175 killed (per ISIL)
- 1 civilian killed

The Southern Damascus offensive (March 2018) started on 12 March 2018, when ISIL began attacking rebel positions in the al-Qadam neighborhood of southern Damascus as they were evacuating. The rebel pocket in al-Qadam had been surrounded on one side by government forces and on the other by ISIL. On 10 March, ISIL threatened to kill any rebels that evacuate from the area after the Syrian government gave the rebels 48 hours to surrender the district and evacuate. Following news of the upcoming rebel evacuation from al-Qadam, ISIL forces attacked the rebels on 12 March and captured 25 percent of the neighborhood. The next day, around 300 rebel fighters and their family members were evacuated from al-Qadam to rebel territory in Idlib province. After the evacuation, government troops took control of 70 percent of the neighborhood, while the remaining 30 was under IS control. During the fighting, government air-strikes were conducted against ISIL in Al-Hajar al-Aswad and al-Qadam. While the clashes were taking place in Qadam, rebel groups attempted to break through ISIL lines in Yarmouk but were repelled.

On 14 March, ISIL launched an assault against Syrian Army positions in al-Qadam, managing to advance slightly. The attack was renewed the following day but without any advances and by 16 March, the ISIL offensive had stalled. During the fighting in al-Qadam, government forces suffered heavy losses with 40 soldiers being killed and at least one tank knocked out.

Overnight on 19 March, ISIL forces launched a surprise attack on government positions in al-Qadam and by the following day ISIL gained ground, pushing back the military. According to the pro-opposition activist group the SOHR, ISIL took full control of al-Qadam, with 36 soldiers being killed and dozens of others wounded, captured or missing. In contrast, military sources initially reported control of al-Qadam was divided and that ISIL failed to capture the central and western neighborhoods of the district. However, later they confirmed ISIL had taken control of 90 percent of the district following a chaotic Army withdrawal due to poor coordination between different military branches and that the Army was in control of one western neighborhood. Five of the missing soldiers were eventually rescued after becoming trapped behind ISIL lines, while others were reported to be isolated in ISIL territory. Still, later, it was stated no more living soldiers remained behind ISIL lines. At this time, veteran units of the 4th Armoured Division were sent as reinforcements to al-Qadam to try to retake the lost areas. Later that day, following heavy artillery strikes against ISIL positions, a two-day ceasefire was announced.

On 21 March, it was reported that the military's death toll from ISIL's attack had risen to 62, after 26 bodies of the previously missing were retrieved. On the same day, ISIL executed a captured commander from the Palestinian People's Party, Nidal Darwish, in the al-Qadam neighborhood.

== Aftermath ==
On 19 April, the SAA and allied Palestinian militias launched an offensive to dislodge ISIL from the pocket.

During the night of 19 May, an agreement was put in place in southern Damascus between the Syrian Army and ISIL after the militants agreed to surrender their last positions in the Yarmouk Camp and Hajar Al-Aswad. The next day, buses started entering the ISIL pocket to transport their fighters to the desert region in eastern Syria. Later on 21 May, the military officially announced that they had completely regained control of the area, ending the existence of anti-government forces around the capital Damascus.

== See also ==
- Battle of Yarmouk Camp (2015)
- Eastern Qalamoun offensive (September–October 2016)
- List of wars and battles involving ISIL
