= Sayyad, Iran =

Sayyad (Persian: صياد) in Iran may refer to:

- Sayyad, Bushehr
- Sayyad, Kurdistan
