= Panthera F9 =

Type of Armored Personnel Carrier

F9
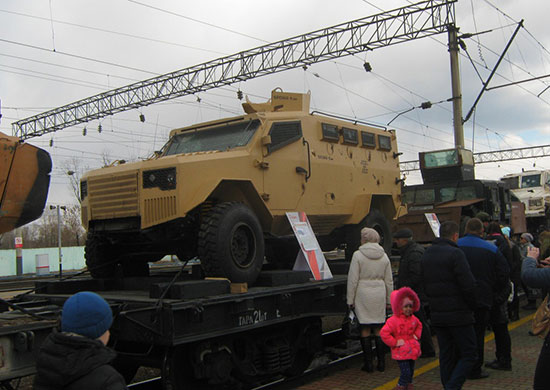
- A Panthera F9 captured in Syria and on display in Russia
- Type: Armored Personnel Carrier
- Place of origin: United Arab Emirates / Turkey

Service history
- In service: 2017–present
- Used by: See operators

Production history
- Produced: 2017–Present
- Variants: See variants

Specifications
- Crew: 2, up to 9 passengers
- Armor: Cast armor rated at B7/STANAG 4569-2 and mine resistance rated at STANAG 4569-1
- Main armament: Modular, some unarmed, others ARX20 20mm cannon
- Engine: 6.7L power stroke V8 turbo-diesel
- Transmission: TorqShift 6-speed automatic

The Panthera F9 is a UAE-designed 5-door armored personnel carrier designed for border protection, policing and low-intensity military operations. The vehicle is designed to have a fully modular weapons system, with a base model sold without any armament. The F9 comes equipped with a remote controlled, roof-mounted search light, run-flat tyres, a rear-view camera, air conditioning, as well as side and rear facing gun ports.

The base model F9 is produced by MSPV in the United Arab Emirates. The Panthera F9 is also produced at a military production plant located in Ankara, Turkey.

== History ==
The Panthera F9 is officially used by the armed forces of the UAE and Egypt. Furthermore, Turkish-made Panthera F9s have been supplied as military aid to various armed groups in the Syrian Opposition during the ongoing Syrian Civil War, while UAE-made models were shown to be in possession of Field Marshal Khalifa Haftar's Tobruk-based Libyan National Army, during the course of the Second Libyan Civil War.

== Variants ==
The company that designed and produced the F9, Minerva Special Purpose Vehicles (MSPV), partnered with French defense firm Nexter Systems to offer the M9 Panthera with a Nexter Systems ARX20 remote-controlled 20mm cannon, with an effective range of up to 1,200m. It may also employ a 7.62×51mm NATO belt-fed machine gun with up to 300 rounds, a GALIX Lacroix smoke discharger, as well as electronic fire detection and waste disposal systems.

Any F9 may optionally be fitted with a C4ISR surveillance system, electronic counter-measures, a non-lethal "STORM" or other custom configurations. It can also be fitted with a 360 degree ring mount, which can accept standard small arms.

The Panthera M9 is also offered in an armored ambulance configuration, holding up to 4 stretchers.

Several more vehicles of the Panthera family exist, with sizes ranging from 6 tonne to 23 tonne variants.

== Operators ==
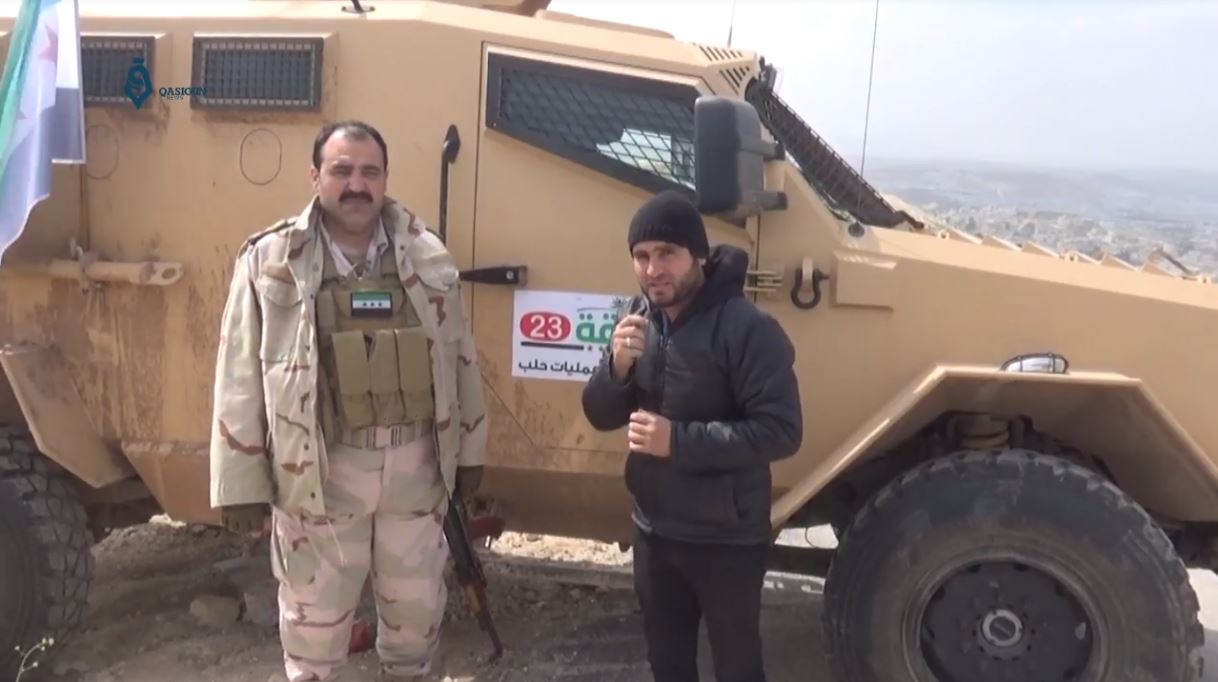
Panthera F9 of the Syrian rebel 23rd Division, during Operation Olive Branch, 2018.

- Cameroon
- Egypt
- Free Syrian Army
  - Syrian National Army
  - National Front for Liberation
  - Army of Glory
- Kenya
- Libya
  - Libyan National Army
  - Libyan Army
- Turkey
- United Arab Emirates
- Ukraine (delivery from December 2022)
