= Shahranaz =

Shahranaz شهرناز
- Town
- Location in Syria
- Coordinates: 35°30′57″N 36°24′12″E
- Country: Syria
- Governorate: Hama
- District: Suqaylabiyah
- Subdistrict: Qalaat al-Madiq

Population (2004)
  - Total: 1,646
- Time zone: UTC+3 (AST)
- City Qrya Pcode: C3191

Shahranaz (Arabic: شهرناز) is a Syrian town located in the Qalaat al-Madiq Subdistrict of the al-Suqaylabiyah District in Hama Governorate. According to the Syria Central Bureau of Statistics (CBS), Shahranaz had a population of 1,646 in the 2004 census. Its inhabitants are predominantly Sunni Muslims.
