= Midan Ghazal =

Midan Ghazal ميدان غزال
- Village
- Location in Syria
- Coordinates: 35°28′18″N 36°24′5″E
- Country: Syria
- Governorate: Hama
- District: Suqaylabiyah
- Subdistrict: Qalaat al-Madiq

Population (2004)
  - Total: 631
- Time zone: UTC+3 (AST)
- City Qrya Pcode: N/A

Midan Ghazal (Arabic: ميدان غزال) is a Syrian village located in the Qalaat al-Madiq Subdistrict in the al-Suqaylabiyah District in Hama Governorate. According to the Syria Central Bureau of Statistics (CBS), Midan Ghazal had a population of 631 in the 2004 census. Its inhabitants are predominantly Sunni Muslims.
