= Malhama Tactical =

Private military contractor operating in the Syrian Civil War

- Type: Private
- Industry: Private military company
- Founded: Idlib Governorate, Syria, 2015
- Founders: Abu Rofiq (Abu Salman) †
- Defunct: January 2025
- Area served: Syria
- Key people: Ali al-Shishani; Abu Salman Belarusi †; Abu Rofiq †
- Services: Military consultation and training

Malhama Tactical is a private military contractor that operates in Syria.

The group was founded by a pseudonymous Uzbek jihadist called Abu Rofiq and operated in the Syrian Civil War. It was closely allied with Jabhat Fateh al-Sham and its successor group Tahrir al-Sham. Its around dozen members occasionally participate in combat and run guns, but primarily provide training. The company has worked with Ahrar al-Sham and the Turkistan Islamic Party. According to the pro-government Al-Masdar News, its leader Abu Rofiq was killed in an airstrike on 7 February 2017, though his death has been questioned. The group stands in opposition to IS.

== History ==
Some Malhama Tactical fighters wear Ichkeria flags (pictured) on their uniforms to display loyalty to the "Chechen liberation movement".

The company was founded in 2015 and came to prominence in early 2017. However, according to the Twitter account of the current leader of Malhama Tactical, Abu Salman Belarus, the group has been active since 2013 in what he has described as "emergency aid on the battlefield." They have been noted for their prolific and successful use of social media to advertise their services. Malhama Tactical is active in the Idlib-Aleppo region. Fighters are noted to be considerably better trained than other Syrian fighters, although not as good as Western soldiers, and to be very well equipped. According to Al-Masdar, they are well trained in medical care, which allows them to reduce their casualties.

In May and July 2017, Malhama Tactical conducted raids against government forces in the western Aleppo Governorate alongside Ajnad al-Kavkaz. In November 2018, Malhama Tactical together with Tahrir al-Sham conducted a night raid on a Syrian Army & Russian base, in which allegedly 25 soldiers were killed, seven of whom were Russians. After the death of Abu Salman (Abu Rofiq), Ali Al-Shishani became the new leader of Malhama Tactical.

Due to its high level of specialization, organization and usage it has been dubbed the "Blackwater of Jihad". They were reported on by The Jamestown Foundation in 2017, and investigated by US agencies before 2020, where a sealed case against them was filed in the US.

In February 2023, a Manhattan jury convicted Victoria Jacobs (a.k.a. Bakhrom Talipov) on ten felony counts related to her support for Malhama Tactical. Prosecutors stated that she raised and laundered thousands of dollars for the group, in addition to procuring bomb-making instructions and knives. She was sentenced to 18 years in prison.

It seems that by 2021, Malhama Tactical is defunct as a producer of propaganda, but still exists on the ground as of 2023. Yurtugh Tactical and Muhojir Tactical have also become prominent.

According to a spokesman of Yurtugh, they have no relation with Malhama Tactical and none of their members went to Malhama camps. In fact, Yurtugh claims that "We do not have any relation to paramilitary groups outside of our location." An interviewee representing Muhojir said, "There are good relations with Malhama Tactical and also with Yurtugh Tactical." And also stated that "We are subservient to HTS, as Syria is their land."

After the fall of the Assad regime, Malhama Tactical assisted in training the rebuilt Syrian Army.
