= Tell Huwash =

Tal Hawash تل هواش
- Village
- Location in Syria
- Coordinates: 35.448618°N 36.454547°E
- Country: Syria
- Governorate: Hama
- District: Al-Suqaylabiyah District
- Subdistrict: Qalaat al-Madiq

Population (2004)
  - Total: 2,498
- Time zone: UTC+3 (AST)
- City Qrya Pcode: C3197

Tal Hawash (Arabic: تل هواش) is a Syrian village located in Qalaat al-Madiq Subdistrict in Al-Suqaylabiyah District, Hama. According to the Syria Central Bureau of Statistics (CBS), Tal Hawash had a population of 2,498 in the 2004 census.
