= Jubbayn =

Jubbayn جبين Jbine, Jabin
- Town
- Location in Syria
- Coordinates: 35°20′17″N 36°30′48″E
- Country: Syria
- Governorate: Hama
- District: Mahardah
- Subdistrict: Karnaz

Population (2004)
  - Total: 3,488
- Time zone: UTC+3 (AST)
- City Qrya Pcode: C3466

Jubbayn (Arabic: جبين) is a village in central Syria, administratively part of the Karnaz Subdistrict of the Mahardah District of Hama Governorate. According to the Syria Central Bureau of Statistics (CBS), Jubbayn had a population of 3,488 in the 2004 census. The inhabitants of Jubbayn are Sunni Muslims.

== History ==
Jubbayn was settled in 1921 by the Smathie, a breakaway tribe of the Mawali, a semi-nomadic Bedouin confederation in northwestern and central Syria, who were brought in to cultivate the village lands by the owners, the Baroudi family of Hama city. The village was deserted at the end of the Syrian Civil War due to the displacement of its residents, but many returned in the months that followed.

== Bibliography ==
- Comité de l'Asie française (April 1933). "Notes sur la propriété foncière dans le Syrie centrale (Notes on Landownership in Central Syria)". Bulletin du Comité de l'Asie française (in French). 33 (309). Comité de l'Asie française: 131–137.
