= Rouse the Believers Operations Room =

Militant group

Rouse the Believers
- Arabic: غرفة عمليات وحرض المؤمنين, romanized: Ghurfat Eamaliat wa-Harid al-Mu'minin
- Logo of the alliance Flag used by Rouse the Believers
- Dates active: October 2018 – 12 June 2020
- Groups: Hurras al-Din; Ansar al-Din Front; Jama'at Ansar al-Islam; Ansar al-Tawhid (until 3 May 2020)
- Active regions: Northwestern Syria: Hama Governorate; Aleppo Governorate; Idlib Governorate; Latakia Governorate
- Ideology: Salafi jihadism
- Wars: Syrian civil war

The Rouse the Believers Operations Room (Arabic: غرفة عمليات وحرض المؤمنين, romanized: Ghurfat Eamaliat wa-Harid al-Mu'minin) (also commonly translated as the And Incite the Believers Operations Room) was a coalition of Salafist jihadist insurgent groups in northwestern Syria during the Syrian civil war.

== Composition ==
The coalition included Hurras al-Din, Ansar al-Din Front, and Jama'at Ansar al-Islam. All of the individual organizations in the group have rejected the Sochi agreement. Ansar al-Tawhid left the group on 3 May 2020.

== History ==
On 24 October 2018, the operation room shelled multiple Syrian military positions in the town of Jurin in the Hama Governorate with SPG-9 recoilless guns. In response, the Syrian Army shelled a town controlled by the operation room 10 km north of Jurin.

On 28 October 2018, the group published a video near al-Zahraa in the Aleppo Governorate of a sniping operation being carried out against pro-government militiamen.

On 27 November 2018, a video was released by the coalition showing fighters attacking government positions and gunning down pro-government militiamen in their quarters and taking their weapons.

On 27 August 2019, Rouse the Believers conducted a counter-offensive in southern Idlib targeting the Syrian government's positions near the town of Atshan. The Syrian Army reported repelling the attack shortly thereafter. Rebel forces reported taking over the villages of al-Salloumiyah, Sham al-Hawa, Tell Maraq and Al-Jaduiyah later in the day. SOHR confirmed that al-Sullaumiyah and Abu Omar had been recaptured by opposition forces and that some advances were made on Sham al-Hawa, while clashes over the rest of the villages continued. Later on the same day, SOHR reported that the rebel groups had withdrawn from the positions where they had taken earlier in the southeastern countryside of Idlib.

On 31 August 2019, the U.S. carried out a series of airstrikes on a Rouse the Believers meeting between Kafriya and Maarrat Misrin, killing over 40 Hurras al-Din militants, including several leaders.

Ansar al-Tawhid had a falling-out with Hurras al-Din and left the Rouse the Believers Operations Room in May 2020. On 12 June 2020, the operations rooms' remaining members reorganized themselves into a new operations room called So Be Steadfast, which included two additional Salafi jihadist groups led by former HTS commanders, namely the Ansar Fighters Brigade and Jihad Coordination.

== See also ==
- Army of Conquest
- Belligerents in the Syrian civil war
- Islamist anti-Turkey groups in the Syrian civil war
