= Seydan, Kurdistan =

Village in iran

Seydan صيدان
- Village
- Location within Iran
- Coordinates: 35°37′20″N 47°18′31″E
- Country: Iran
- Province: Kurdistan
- County: Sanandaj
- Bakhsh: Central
- Rural District: Hoseynabad-e Jonubi

Population (2006)
  - Total: 99
- Time zone: UTC+3:30 (IRST)
  - Summer (DST): UTC+4:30 (IRDT)

Seydan (Persian: صيدان, also Romanized as Şeydān; also known as Saiyad and Şayyād) is a village in Hoseynabad-e Jonubi Rural District, in the Central District of Sanandaj County, Kurdistan Province, Iran. At the 2006 census, its population was 99, in 23 families. The village is populated by Kurds.
