= Al-Huwayz =

Al-Huwayz al-Qibla الحويزالقبلي Al-Huwayz, Huweiz
- Village
- Location in Syria
- Coordinates: 35°30′0″N 36°21′19″E
- Country: Syria
- Governorate: Hama
- District: Suqaylabiyah
- Subdistrict: Qalaat al-Madiq

Population (2004)
  - Total: 2,395
- Time zone: UTC+3 (AST)
- City Qrya Pcode: N/A

Al-Huwayz al-Qibla (Arabic: الحويزالقبلي, also known as al-Huwayz or Huweiz) is a village in northern Syria, located in the Qalaat al-Madiq Subdistrict of al-Suqaylabiyah District in Hama Governorate. According to the Syria Central Bureau of Statistics (CBS), it had a population of 2,395 in the 2004 census. The village's inhabitants are predominantly Sunni Muslims.
