= Al-Muhajirin, Hama Governorate =

Al-Muhajirin المهاجرين
- Village
- Location in Syria
- Country: Syria
- Governorate: Hama
- District: Al-Suqaylabiyah District
- Subdistrict: Qalaat al-Madiq

Population (2004)
  - Total: 158
- Time zone: UTC+3 (AST)
- City Qrya Pcode: N/A

Al-Muhajirin (Arabic: المهاجرين al-muhājirīn, meaning "the emigrants) is a Syrian village located in Qalaat al-Madiq Subdistrict in Al-Suqaylabiyah District, Hama. According to the Syria Central Bureau of Statistics (CBS), the village had a population of 158 in the 2004 census.
