= Al-Sayyad =

Al-Sayyad الصياد
- Town
- Location in Syria
- Coordinates: 35°23′56″N 36°37′3″E
- Country: Syria
- Governorate: Hama
- District: Mahardah
- Subdistrict: Kafr Zita

Population (2004)
  - Total: 394
- Time zone: UTC+3 (AST)
- City Qrya Pcode: C3460

Al-Sayyad (Arabic: الصياد) is a Syrian town located in the Kafr Zita Subdistrict of the Mahardah District in Hama Governorate. According to the Syria Central Bureau of Statistics (CBS), al-Sayyad had a population of 394 in the 2004 census. Its inhabitants are predominantly Sunni Muslims.

== Bibliography ==
- Robinson, E.; Smith, E. (1841). Biblical Researches in Palestine, Mount Sinai and Arabia Petraea: A Journal of Travels in the year 1838. Vol. 3. Boston: Crocker & Brewster.
