= Ansar Abu Bakr al-Siddiq =

Sunni Islamist militant group

- أنصار أبو بكر الصديق
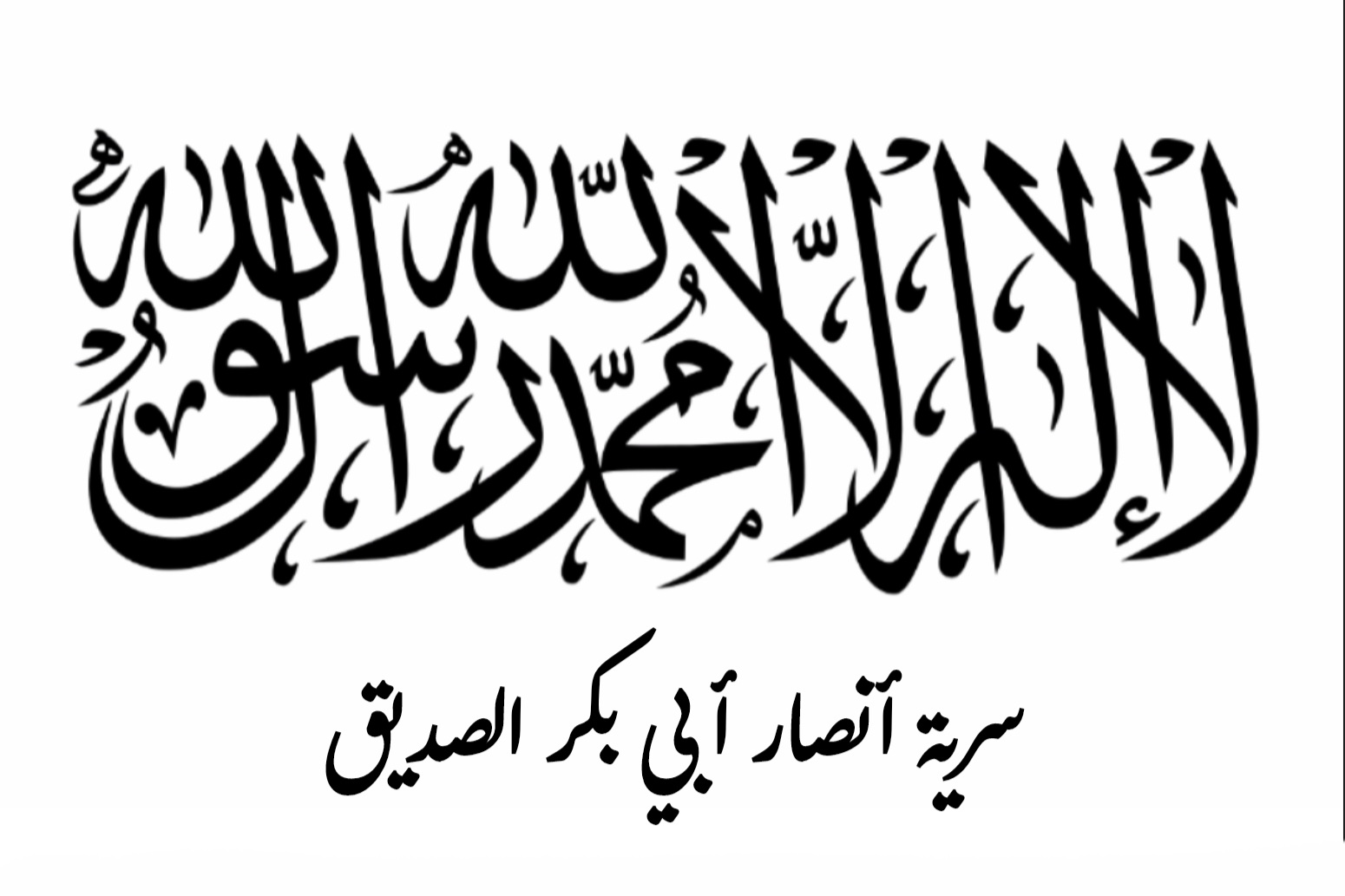
- Flag used by the organization
- Founded: August 2020
- Dates active: 2020-2023
- Active regions: Aleppo Governorate, Idlib Governorate, Hama Governorate
- Ideology: Islamism; Anti-Turkish sentiment Salafi jihadism
- Wars: the Syrian civil war

Ansar Abu Bakr al-Siddiq (Arabic: أنصار أبو بكر الصديق, lit. 'Partisans of Abu Bakr the Truthful') is a Sunni Islamist militant group active in the Syrian civil war.

== History ==
The group was founded in August 2020, by Islamists who were frustrated by how some Islamist rebel groups around Idlib tolerated Turkey. Many Islamists believed that a jihad against Turkish presence in northwest Syria was mandatory as they considered it an infidel occupation of Muslim lands that should be treated the same as Russian and Iranian presence in Syria. Their main ideologue was Khayal al-Manhaj. Their goal is to control the entirety of Syria and rule it with Sharia. The group announced its formation with an attack on Turkish soldiers in the Jisr ash-Shughur countryside. They target the Assad regime as well. It is a Salafi group. From December 2020 to September 2021, they were extremely consistent in rampages against Turkish soldiers and bases. Towards late 2021, the group attacked Turkish forces 19 more times while waging an insurgency against HTS. Common techniques they used against Turkey included bombings and sniping. HTS actively launched raids against the group. Turkey described the group as a "terrorist group". In October 2021, the HTS claimed to have arrested one of the group's leaders, although the group denied that the person was even one of their members. On the Friday after the arrest, the group bombed a Turkish army vehicle, killing two soldiers, injuring three Turkish civilians, and three Sham Legion members. The group participated in meetings between small Salafi factions. They were also in talks with the Islamic State, in which IS supported the group in their fight against Turkey and Turkish-backed factions. Abu Osama al-Azeri, an IS representative, suggested the establishment of an alliance between the two groups against Turkey. HTS attempts at cracking down on the group continued in 2022.
