= Al-Zakah =

al-Zakah الزكاة
- Town
- Location in Syria
- Coordinates: 35°20′24″N 36°34′32″E
- Country: Syria
- Governorate: Hama
- District: Mahardah
- Subdistrict: Kafr Zita

Population (2004)
  - Total: 1,771
- Time zone: UTC+3 (AST)
- City Qrya Pcode: C3461

Al-Zakah (Arabic: الزكاة, also spelled al-Zakat) is a Syrian town located in the Kafr Zita Subdistrict of the Mahardah District in Hama Governorate. According to the Syria Central Bureau of Statistics (CBS), al-Zakah had a population of 1,771 in the 2004 census.
