= Tell Malah =

Tell Malah تل ملح
- Town
- Location in Syria
- Coordinates: 35°18′26″N 36°31′11″E
- Country: Syria
- Governorate: Hama
- District: Mahardah
- Subdistrict: Mahardah

Population (2004)
  - Total: 876
- Time zone: UTC+3 (AST)
- City Qrya Pcode: C3445

Tell Malah (Arabic: تل ملح) is a Syrian town located in the Mahardah Subdistrict of the Mahardah District in Hama Governorate. According to the Syria Central Bureau of Statistics (CBS), Tell Malah had a population of 876 in the 2004 census.

During the 2014 and 2019 offensives, the village suffered heavy fighting, leading to much of the village turning into rubble, being located by the frontlines between 2013 and 2019. In the village, Abdel Basset Sarout was martyred. On 2 December 2024, as part of the Operation in Deterrence of Aggression, the village was liberated by Tahrir al-Sham.
