= Abdul Baset al-Sarout =

Syrian footballer and rebel (1992–2019)

- عبدالباسط الساروت
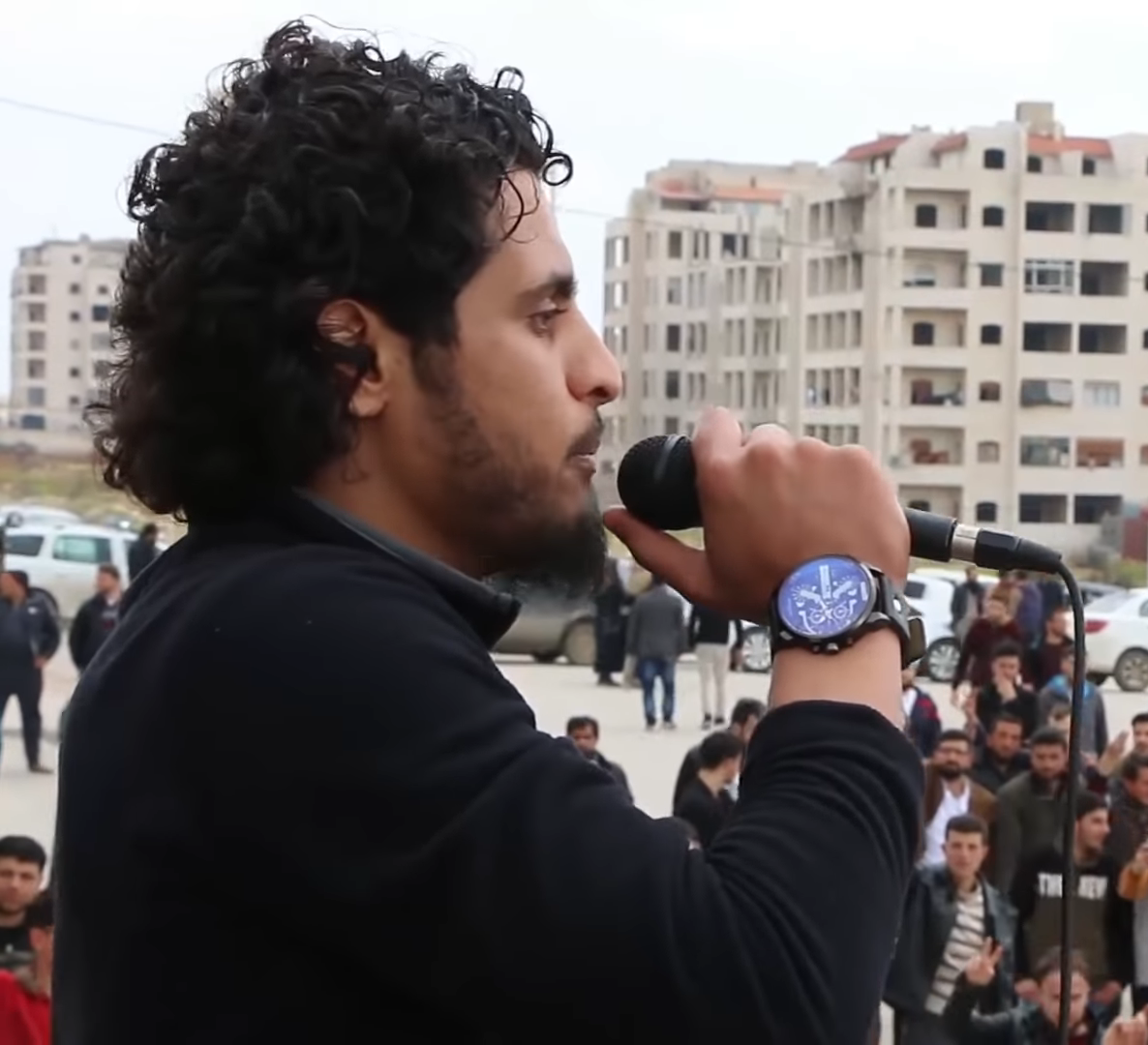
- Sarout in Idlib on 18 March 2019
- Born: 1 January 1992; Homs, Syria
- Died: 8 June 2019 (aged 27); Reyhanlı, Hatay, Turkey
- Military career
- Allegiance: Syrian opposition
- Branch: (Syrian opposition) Free Syrian Army; (Syrian opposition) Jaysh al-Izza
- Service years: 2011–2019
- Units: Al-Bayadah Martyrs' Brigade; Homs al-Adyyah Brigade (subunit of Jaysh al-Izza)
- Conflicts: Syrian Civil War; Siege of Homs; Siege of Northern Homs; Inter-rebel conflict during the Syrian Civil War; 2019 Northwestern Syria offensive †
Association football career
- Position: Goalkeeper
Youth career
- ?–2011: Al-Karamah
International career
Years	Team	Apps	(Gls)
2007–2008	Syria U17		
2009–2010	Syria U20		
2007–2010	Syria		
- Website: www.instagram.com/abdulbasitalsarout1/

Abdul Baset al-Sarout (Arabic: عبد الباسط الساروت; 1 January 1992 – 8 June 2019) was a Syrian football goalkeeper, Jihadist, and prominent rebel figure during the Syrian revolution. He represented his country at both the U17 and U20 levels.

Al-Sarout became known by the epithet "Keeper of the Revolution", a wordplay on him being an ex-goalkeeper.

== Biography ==
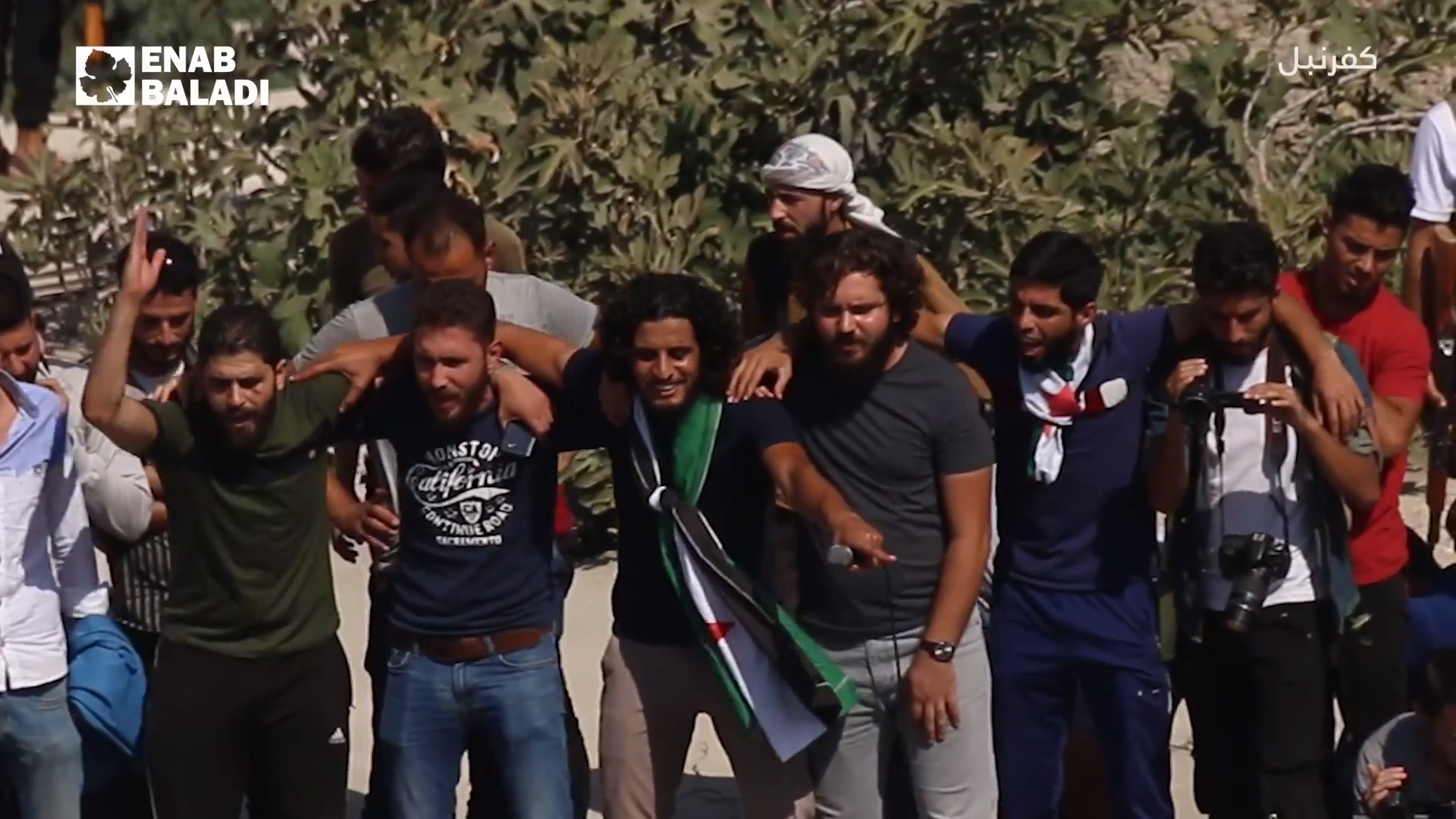
Sarout (center with flag) during a pro-rebel demonstration in Kafr Nabl on 5 October 2018

Abdul Baset al-Sarout was born to a Bedouin family in Al-Bayadah, a neighborhood of Homs. He was a goalkeeper for Al-Karamah SC and represented the Syrian national team at youth levels. When the Syrian revolution started in 2011, he led demonstrations in his hometown of Homs demanding the removal of Syrian President Bashar al-Assad, and became well-known for his chants. Initially, his speeches and chants were mostly nationalist in nature, but in line with the rising influence of Islamism among Syrian rebel groups, they adopted more overtly religious undertones. Notably, at a 2012 opposition rally, al-Sarout called for the extermination of Alawites.

As violence erupted, al-Sarout joined the Islamist Free Syrian Army. During the Siege of Homs, he commanded the Al-Bayadah Martyrs’ Brigade. Four of his brothers, who were fighting with him in the same battalion, were killed. In 2013, he was featured in the war documentary The Return to Homs. Following the surrender deal that ended the siege in 2014, he was among the rebels evacuated from Homs to the rebel-held Idlib Governorate by the Syrian government.

Before his evacuation from Homs, al-Sarout called on ISIS and the Al-Nusra Front, the arm of al-Qaeda in Syria, to unite to “fight shoulder to shoulder” against the Christians to reclaim Syria. He stated: “We’re not Christians nor Shiites to be afraid of suicide belts and car bombs.” He also stated: “This is a message to the Islamic State, and our brothers in Al-Nusra, that all of us are one hand to fight the Christians and take back the lands defiled by the regime.” By November 2015, following infighting between Syrian rebel groups, news spread that al-Sarout had pledged allegiance to ISIS, and a warrant was issued for his arrest by the Al-Nusra Front. Al-Sarout escaped to Turkey, but surrendered in 2017 to an Islamic court in Idlib. He was acquitted, claiming that he gave up on joining the group after realizing that it was primarily concerned with setting up a caliphate, rather than fighting the government. He added that while he didn't join the militant group, he would also refuse to fight against it.

Following his return to Idlib Governorate, al-Sarout was arrested by Tahrir al-Sham after being accused of participating in an anti-HTS protest in Maarat al-Nu'man. He was released on June 24 and charges against him were dropped.

In 2018, after the decentralization of the Free Syrian Army, Sarout became a commander in the rebel group Jaysh al-Izza.

== Death ==
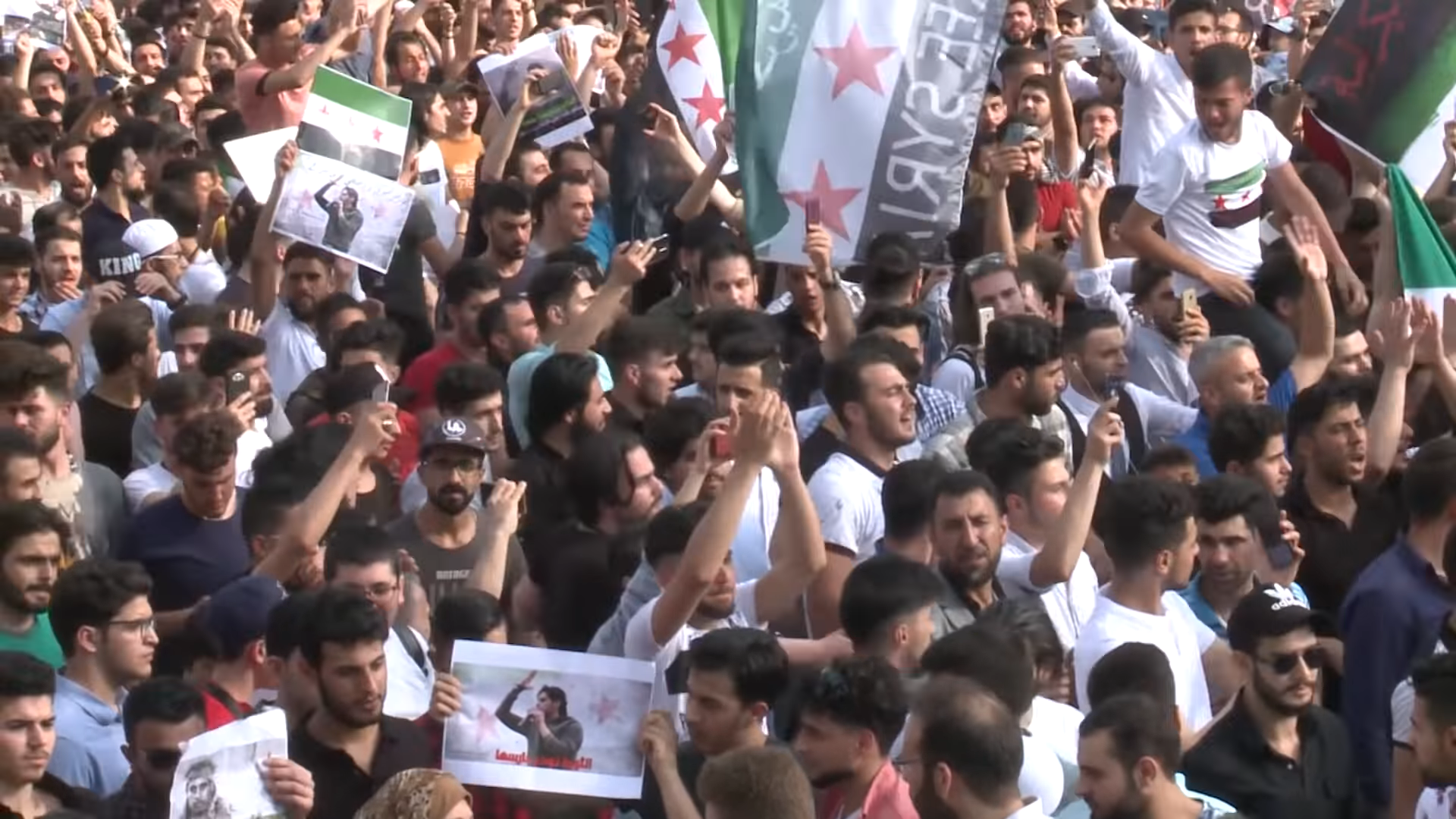
Syrian rebel supporters demonstrate after they held a prayer for Sarout at the Fatih Mosque in Istanbul, 9 June 2019, which drew criticism from the opposition Peoples' Democratic Party (HDP).

Al-Sarout died on June 8, 2019, during the 2019 Northwestern Syria offensive, after engaging in combat with the Syrian Army at Tell Malah. According to a Jayish al-Izza spokesperson, as well as the pro-opposition Syrian Observatory for Human Rights, he died in a Turkish hospital in Reyhanlı, Hatay from wounds sustained two days prior, when he was struck by Syrian Army artillery, after his unit clashed with the army in northern Hama. He was taken a day later to the village of Al-Dana in rebel-held northwestern Syria, to be buried with one of his deceased brothers.

== Controversy ==
At a 2012 opposition rally, Al-Sarout chanted, "We are all Jihadists, Homs has made its decision, we will exterminate the Alawites, and the Shiites have to go".

In 2014, Al-Sarout directed messages to ISIS and the Al-Nusra Front, the arm of al-Qaeda in Syria to unite to “fight Christians”, he stated: “They are Muslims just as we are, just as their goal is to empower Allah’s law on earth, so is ours,” “We’re not Christians nor Shiites to be afraid of suicide belts and car bombs.” He also stated: “This is a message to the Islamic State, and our brothers in Al-Nusra, that all of us are one hand to fight the Christians and take back the lands defiled by the regime.”
