= Sukayk =

Sukayk سكيك
- Town
- Location in Syria
- Coordinates: 35.429239°N 36.770532°E
- Country: Syria
- Governorate: Idlib
- District: Maarrat al-Nu'man
- Subdistrict: Al-Tamanah

Population (2004)
  - Total: 848
- Time zone: UTC+2 (EET)
  - Summer (DST): UTC+3 (EEST)

Sukayk (Arabic: سكيك) is a Syrian town located in the Al-Tamanaah Subdistrict in Maarrat al-Nu'man District. located near by Atshan. According to the Syria Central Bureau of Statistics (CBS), Sukayk had a population of 848 in the 2004 census.
