= Rakaya Sijneh =

Rakaya Sijneh ركايا سجنة
- Village
- Location in Syria
- Country: Syria
- Governorate: Idlib
- District: Maarrat al-Nu'man District
- Subdistrict: Hish Nahiyah

Population (2004)
  - Total: 2,472
- Time zone: UTC+2 (EET)
  - Summer (DST): UTC+3 (EEST)
- City Qrya Pcode: C4102

Rakaya Sijneh (Arabic: ركايا سجنة) is a Syrian village located in Hish Nahiyah in Maarrat al-Nu'man District, Idlib. According to the Syria Central Bureau of Statistics (CBS), Rakaya Sijneh had a population of 2472 in the 2004 census.
