= Kafr Zita Subdistrict =

Kafr Zita Subdistrict ناحية كفر زيتا
- Subdistrict (nahiyah)
- Location in Hama Governorate

- Location in Syria
- Coordinates: 35°22′26.9″N 36°36′5.7″E
- Country: Syria
- Governorate: Hama
- District: Mhardeh District
- Capital: Kafr Zita

Population (2004)
  - Total: 39,302
- Time zone: UTC+2 (EET)
  - Summer (DST): UTC+3 (EEST)
- Nahya pcod: SY050501

Kafr Zita Subdistrict (Arabic: ناحية كفر زيتا) is a Syrian nahiyah (subdistrict) located in Mhardeh District in Hama. According to the Syria Central Bureau of Statistics (CBS), Kafr Zita Subdistrict had a population of 39,302 in the 2004 census.
