= Khan Shaykhun Subdistrict =

Khan Shaykhun Subdistrict ناحية خان شيخون
- Nahiyah
- Location in Idlib Governorate

- Location in Syria
- Country: Syria
- Governorate: Idlib
- District: Maarrat al-Nu'man District

Population (2004)
  - Total: 50,469
- Time zone: UTC+2 (EET)
  - Summer (DST): UTC+3 (EEST)
- Nahya pcod: SY070201

Khan Shaykhun Subdistrict (Arabic: ناحية خان شيخون) is a Syrian nahiyah (subdistrict) located in Ma'arrat al-Nu'man District in Idlib. According to the Syria Central Bureau of Statistics (CBS), Khan Shaykhun Subdistrict had a population of 50469 in the 2004 census.
