= Al-Zughbah =

Al-Zughbah الزغبة
- Village
- Location in Syria
- Coordinates: 35°22′51″N 36°57′31″E
- Country: Syria
- Governorate: Hama
- District: Hama
- Subdistrict: Hamraa

Population (2004)
  - Total: 758
- Time zone: UTC+3 (AST)
- City Qrya Pcode: C3075

Al-Zughbah (Arabic: الزغبة) is a village in central Syria, administratively part of the Hamraa Subdistrict of the Hama District, located 40 kilometers (25 mi) east of Hama. According to the Syria Central Bureau of Statistics (CBS), al-Zughbah had a population of 758 in the 2004 census. Its inhabitants are predominantly Alawites. As of 24 February 2025, the village is uninhabited.

In 2004, the Zughba Municipality was established to administer al-Zughba and the neighboring villages of al-Hazim, Duma, al-Samaqiyah al-Qibliyah, Rabda and Arfa. As of 2010, al-Zughba's working inhabitants were engaged in agriculture. The village was the largest producer of pistachios in Hama Governorate, with 8,500 dunams grown with pistachio trees, as well as 3,000 dunams grown with olive groves. Other major crops in the village were wheat, barley, lentils and cumin.
