= Qasr Abu Samrah =

Qasr Abu Samrah قصر أبو سمرة
- Location within Syria
- Coordinates: 35°21′16″N 36°58′19″E
- Country: Syria
- Governorate: Hama Governorate
- District: Hama
- Subdistrict: Suran

Population (2004)
  - Total: 849
- Time zone: UTC+3 (AST)

Qasr Abu Samrah (Arabic: قصر أبو سمرة) is a village and archaeological site in Syria, administratively a part of the Hama District of the Hama Governorate, located 31 kilometers (19 mi) northeast of Hama city. Nearby localities include Zughba to the north, al-Tulaysiyah to northwest, al-Junaynah to the west, Fan al-Shamali and Qasr al-Makhram to the southwest, Duma to the southeast, and al-Hazim to the northeast.

According to the Syria Central Bureau of Statistics, Qasr Abu Samrah had a population of 849 in the 2004 census.

Qasr Abu Samrah contains the ruins of a Byzantine-era tower and church, both of them not well-preserved. The church was built completely from basalt. One row of five columns, out of the original two, remains standing, large doorway of the structure.

On 2 December 2024, the Syrian Salvation Government led by Tahrir al-Sham captured the town after the SAF abandoned their posts in order to retreat into Hama.

== Bibliography ==
- Boulanger, Robert (1966). The Middle East, Lebanon, Syria, Jordan, Iraq, Iran. Hachette.
