= Al-Tulaysiyah =

Al-Tulaysiyah الطليسية Tuleisa Tleisa Tulaysiyah
- Village
- Location in Syria
- Coordinates: 35.367356°N 36.914406°E
- Country: Syria
- Governorate: Hama
- District: Hama
- Subdistrict: Suran

Population (2004)
  - Total: 824
- Time zone: UTC+3 (AST)
- Postal code: C3022

Al-Tulaysiyah (Arabic: الطليسية, also spelled Tleisa or Tuleisa) is a village in northern Syria, administratively part of the Hama Governorate, located northeast of Hama. Nearby localities include Fan al-Shamali to the south, al-Hamraa to the southeast, Atshan to the northwest, Ma'an to the west and Kawkab and Suran to the southwest. According to the Syria Central Bureau of Statistics, Al-Tuleisa had a population of 824 in the 2004 census. Its inhabitants are predominantly Alawites.

== History ==
=== Syrian civil war ===
In mid-May 2013, during the Syrian civil war, the residents abandoned the village after anti-government rebels launched an attack to capture it. After a firefight with a Syrian Army patrol, the rebels captured al-Tulaysiyah. On 14 April 2014, there was shelling from al-Tulaysiyah (where there is a gathering of pro-government troops) against the village of Atshan. On 20 April, rebels attacked the government-held village and destroyed three military vehicles and shelled Brigade 66. On 5 July, nine rebels were killed by a Syrian Army ambush as they were en route to attack checkpoints in al-Tulaysiyah. On 2 September, pro-government militia from the village attacked the town of Tal Khazneh. On 27 Sep 2016, rebels took control of al-Tulaysiyah town and its hill. On 8 October, taking advantage of rebel-infighting in the nearby Idlib province, the Army launched a counter-attack and recaptured al-Tulaysiyah.
