= Aziziye (disambiguation) =

Aziziye, Azizia or Aziziyah (ʿAzīziyye) are place names in Turkish and Arabic. It may refer to:

== Places ==
- Aziziye, a district in Erzurum Province, Turkey
- Aziziye, Biga
- Aziziye, Burdur
- Aziziye, Dursunbey, a village
- Aziziye, Susurluk, a village
- Aziziyah, a neighborhood of Mecca in Makkah Province, Saudi Arabia
- ‘Aziziya, a city and the capital of the Jafara district, Libya
- Aziziyah, Hama, a village located in Al-Hamraa Nahiyah in Hama District, Hama Governorate, Syria
- The former name of Emirdağ, Afyonkarahisar Province, Turkey
- The former name of Pınarbaşı, Kayseri, Turkey

== Other uses ==
- Ottoman ironclad Aziziye
- Panda Retail Company (formerly known as Azizia Panda), a Saudi Arabian grocery retailing company
- Aziziye Mosque (Konya), a mosque in Konya, Turkey
- Aziziye Mosque (London), a mosque in London, United Kingdom
