= Fan Shamali =

Fan Shamali فان شمالي Al-Fan Ashamali
- Village
- Location in Syria
- Coordinates: 35.310433°N 36.918011°E
- Country: Syria
- Governorate: Hama
- District: Hama
- Subdistrict: Suran

Population (2004)
  - Total: 1,877
- Time zone: UTC+3 (AST)

Fan Shamali (Arabic: فان شمالي, also spelled al-Fan Ashamali or Fan esh-Shemali) is a village in northern Syria, administratively part of the Hama Governorate, located northeast of Hama. Nearby localities include Suran and Kawkab to the west, Ma'an to the northwest, Atshan to the north, Qasr Abu Samrah to the northeast, al-Hamraa to the east, Sabburah to the southeast, Fan Qibli and Zighrin to the south and Maar Shahur to the southwest. According to the Syria Central Bureau of Statistics, Fan Shamali had a population of 1,877 in the 2004 census. Its inhabitants are predominantly Sunni Muslims, although most of the surrounding villages and hamlets are inhabited by Alawites.

Fan Shamali contains the ruins of a Byzantine tower dating back to 576 CE.

In early September 2012, during the Syrian civil war, opposition activists reported that a "massacre" occurred in Fan al-Shamali committed by local members of the Shabiha, a pro-government militia. According to activists, at least 30 residents were killed, including women and children.

== Bibliography ==
- Boulanger, Robert (1966). The Middle East, Lebanon, Syria, Jordan, Iraq, Iran. Hachette.
