= Suwak al-Shamali =

Suwak al-Shamali الصواعق الشمالي
- Village
- Country: Syria
- Governorate: Hama
- District: Hama
- Subdistrict: Hama

Population (2004)
  - Total: 3,694
- Time zone: UTC+2 (EET)
  - Summer (DST): UTC+3 (EEST)
- City Qrya Pcode: N/A

Suwak al-Shamali (Arabic: الصواعق الشمالي) is a Syrian village located in the Subdistrict of the Hama District in the Hama Governorate. According to the Syria Central Bureau of Statistics (CBS), Suwak al-Shamali had a population of 3,694 in the 2004 census.
