= Madbaa =

Madbaa المضبعة
- Village
- Location in Syria
- Coordinates: 35°14′23″N 36°52′16″E
- Country: Syria
- Governorate: Hama
- District: Hama
- Subdistrict: Hama

Population (2004)
  - Total: 857
- Time zone: UTC+3 (AST)
- City Qrya Pcode: C3014

Madbaa (Arabic: المضبعة; also transliterated Madba'ah) is a village in central Syria, administratively part of the Hama Governorate. According to the Syria Central Bureau of Statistics (CBS), Madbaa had a population of 857 in the 2004 census. Its inhabitants are Alawites.

== History ==
In the late 19th century or early 20th century, Madbaa was sold by a sheikh of the Bani Khalid tribe, Bedouins of central Syria, to the prominent Kaylani family of Hama. Later in the early 20th century, the Kaylani family sold the village to Najib Agha Barazi, a member of another major landowning family from Hama, in the early 20th century. The inhabitants of the village were Alawite tenant farmers who were settled there in the 1920s or early 1930s.

== Bibliography ==
- Comité de l'Asie française (April 1933). "Notes sur la propriété foncière dans le Syrie centrale (Notes on Landownership in Central Syria)". Bulletin du Comité de l'Asie française (in French). 33 (309). Comité de l'Asie française: 130–136.
