= Huways Ibn Hadib =

Huways Ibn Hadib حوايس بن هديب
- Village
- Location in Syria
- Coordinates: 35°24′11″N 37°7′37″E
- Country: Syria
- Governorate: Hama
- District: Hama
- Subdistrict: Hamraa

Population (2004)
  - Total: 555
- Time zone: UTC+3 (AST)
- City Qrya Pcode: N/A

Hawayes Ben Hdib (Arabic: حوايس بن هديب) is a Syrian village located in Al-Hamraa Nahiyah in Hama District, Hama. According to the Syria Central Bureau of Statistics (CBS), Hawayes Ben Hdib had a population of 555 in the 2004 census.
