= Shiraaya =

Shiraaya شرعايا
- Village
- Location in Syria
- Coordinates: 35°10′6″N 36°43′10″E
- Country: Syria
- Governorate: Hama
- District: Hama
- Subdistrict: Hama

Population (2004)
  - Total: 100
- Time zone: UTC+2 (EET)
  - Summer (DST): UTC+3 (EEST)
- City Qrya Pcode: C3432

Shiraaya (Arabic: شرعايا) is a Syrian village located in the Subdistrict of the Hama District in the Hama Governorate. According to the Syria Central Bureau of Statistics (CBS), Shiraaya had a population of 100 in the 2004 census.
