= Maar Shamali =

maakkar chemali معكر الشمالي
- Village
- Location in Syria
- Country: Syria
- Governorate: Hama
- District: Hama District
- Subdistrict: Al-Hamraa Nahiyah

Population (2004)
  - Total: 744
- Time zone: UTC+3 (AST)
- City Qrya Pcode: C3107

maakkar chemali (Arabic: معكر الشمالي) is a Syrian village located in Al-Hamraa Nahiyah in Hama District, Hama. According to the Syria Central Bureau of Statistics (CBS), maakkar chemali had a population of 744 in the 2004 census. As of 21 February 2025, maakkar chemali had a population of 794.
