= Baroudiyah =

Baroudiyah البارودية
- Village
- Location in Syria
- Coordinates: 35°31′27″N 37°13′29″E
- Country: Syria
- Governorate: Hama
- District: Hama
- Subdistrict: Hamraa

Population (2004)
  - Total: 210
- Time zone: UTC+3 (AST)
- City Qrya Pcode: C3084

Baroudiyeh (Arabic: البارودية) is a Syrian village located in Al-Hamraa Nahiyah in Hama District, Hama. According to the Syria Central Bureau of Statistics (CBS), Baroudiyeh had a population of 210 in the 2004 census. During the Syrian civil war, Baroudiyeh was captured by ISIS, then SAA captured this town on 6 February 2018.
