= Sumaah =

Al-Suma'ah الصومعة
- Village
- Location in Syria
- Coordinates: 35.050481°N 36.473107°E
- Country: Syria
- Governorate: Hama
- District: Hama
- Subdistrict: Hirbnafsah

Population (2004)
  - Total: 222
- Time zone: UTC+2 (EET)
  - Summer (DST): UTC+3 (EEST)
- City Qrya Pcode: C3055

Al-Suma'ah (Arabic: الصومعة) is a village in central Syria, administratively part of the Hirbnafsah Subdistrict of Hama District. According to the Syria Central Bureau of Statistics (CBS), al-Suma'ah had a population of 222 in the 2004 census. Its inhabitants are predominantly Alawites.

== History ==
Sum'ah's inhabitants sold or 'ceded' all or part of their lands to the urban notables of Hama, namely the Kaylani family, in the late 19th or early 20th century, turning its small landowners into tenant farmers. The inhabitants were Alawites.

== Bibliography ==
- Comité de l'Asie française (April 1933). "Notes sur la propriété foncière dans le Syrie centrale (Notes on Landownership in Central Syria)". Bulletin du Comité de l'Asie française (in French). 33 (309). Comité de l'Asie française: 130–136.
