= Jarjara =

Jarjara جرجرة
- Village
- Location in Syria
- Coordinates: 35°8′22″N 36°33′34″E
- Country: Syria
- Governorate: Hama
- District: Hama
- Subdistrict: Hama

Population (2004)
  - Total: 772
- Time zone: UTC+3 (AST)
- City Qrya Pcode: C2970

Jarjara (Arabic: جرجرة) is a Syrian village located in the Hama Subdistrict of Hama District. According to the Syria Central Bureau of Statistics (CBS), Jarjara had a population of 772 in the 2004 census.
