= Arfa (disambiguation) =

Arfa is a village in Syria. Arfa may also refer to

- Arfa (name)
- Arfa Deh, a village in Iran
- Arfa Software Technology Park in Pakistan
- Alternative ribosome-rescue factor A
