= Bayad, Hama =

Bayad البياض
- Village
- Location in Syria
- Coordinates: 35°07′23″N 36°44′33″E
- Country: Syria
- Governorate: Hama
- District: Hama District
- Subdistrict: Hama

Population (2004)
  - Total: 471
- Time zone: UTC+3 (AST)
- City Qrya Pcode: C2963

Bayad (Arabic: البياض) is a Syrian village located in Hama Subdistrict in the Hama District in the Hama. According to the Syria Central Bureau of Statistics (CBS), Bayad had a population of 471 in the 2004 census.
