= Al-Suwayda al-Sharqiyah =

al-Suwayda al-Sharqiyah براق
- Village
- Location in Syria
- Coordinates: 35°1′35″N 36°49′13″E
- Country: Syria
- Governorate: Hama
- District: Hama
- Subdistrict: Hama

Population (2004)
  - Total: 315
- Time zone: UTC+2 (EET)
  - Summer (DST): UTC+3 (EEST)
- City Qrya Pcode: C2984

Boraq (Arabic: براق) is a Syrian village located in the Subdistrict of the Hama District in the Hama Governorate. According to the Syria Central Bureau of Statistics (CBS), Boraq had a population of 315 in the 2004 census. Its inhabitants are predominantly Sunni Muslims.

== Bibliography ==
- Smith, Eli; Robinson, Edward (1841). Biblical Researches in Palestine, Mount Sinai and Arabia Petraea: A Journal of Travels in the Year 1838. Vol. 3. Crocker and Brewster.
