= Fayda =

Fayda الفيضة
- Village
- Location in Syria
- Coordinates: 35°28′59″N 37°12′56″E
- Country: Syria
- Governorate: Hama
- District: Hama
- Subdistrict: Hamraa

Population (2004)
  - Total: 240
- Time zone: UTC+3 (AST)
- City Qrya Pcode: C3092

Fayda (Arabic: الفيضة) is a Syrian village located in Al-Hamraa Nahiyah in Hama District, Hama. According to the Syria Central Bureau of Statistics (CBS), Fayda had a population of 240 in the 2004 census.
