= Al-Ruqaita =

Al-Ruqaita الرقيطة
- Village
- Location in Syria
- Coordinates: 35°6′33″N 36°43′20″E
- Country: Syria
- Governorate: Hama
- District: Hama
- Subdistrict: Hama
- Time zone: UTC+3 (AST)

Al-Ruqaita also spelled Al-Ruqaytah (Arabic: الرقيطة) is a Syrian village located in Hama Nahiyah in Hama District in Hama. It is located two kilometers south of the city of Hama. The village was founded in 2008.
