= Junaynah =

Junaynah جنينة Jneineh
- Village
- Location in Syria
- Coordinates: 35°29′43″N 37°17′54″E
- Country: Syria
- Governorate: Hama
- District: Hama
- Subdistrict: Hamraa

Population (2004)
  - Total: 1,388
- Time zone: UTC+3 (AST)
- City Qrya Pcode: C3100

Junaynah (Arabic: جنينة; also transliterated Jneineh) is a village in central Syria, administratively part of the Hamraa Subdistrict of the Hama District. According to the Syria Central Bureau of Statistics (CBS), Junaynah had a population of 1,388 in the 2004 census. Its inhabitants are predominantly Alawites.

== History ==
In 1890, Junaynah was sold by the partly Bedouin Ma'adid tribe to the Kaylani family, Hama-based notables. By the 1920s or early 1930s, the Hama landowners settled the village with Alawite tenant farmers to cultivate its lands.

== Bibliography ==
- Comité de l'Asie française (April 1933). "Notes sur la propriété foncière dans le Syrie centrale (Notes on Landownership in Central Syria)". Bulletin du Comité de l'Asie française (in French). 33 (309). Comité de l'Asie française: 130–136.
