= Khirbet Aref =

Khirbet Aref خربة عارف
- Village
- Location in Syria
- Coordinates: 34°59′9″N 36°33′23″E
- Country: Syria
- Governorate: Hama
- District: Hama
- Subdistrict: Hirbnafsah

Population (2004)
  - Total: 627
- Time zone: UTC+3 (AST)
- City Qrya Pcode: C3042

Khirbet Aref (Arabic: خربة عارف) is a Syrian village located in the Hirbnafsah Subdistrict in Hama District. According to the Syria Central Bureau of Statistics (CBS), Khirbet Aref had a population of 627 in the 2004 census.
