= Baja, Hama =

al-Baja البجة
- Village
- Location in Syria
- Coordinates: 35°1′6″N 36°31′42″E
- Country: Syria
- Governorate: Hama
- District: Hama
- Subdistrict: Hirbnafsah

Population (2004)
  - Total: 531
- Time zone: UTC+3 (AST)
- City Qrya Pcode: C3043

Al-Baja (Arabic: البجة) is a Syrian village located in the Hirbnafsah Subdistrict in Hama District. According to the Syria Central Bureau of Statistics (CBS), al-Baja had a population of 531 in the 2004 census.
