= Kafr Qadah =

Kafr Qadah كفرقدح
- Village
- Location in Syria
- Coordinates: 34°58′N 36°32′E
- Country: Syria
- Governorate: Hama
- District: Hama District
- Subdistrict: Hirbnafsah Nahiyah

Population (2004)
  - Total: 1,049
- Time zone: UTC+3 (AST)
- City Qrya Pcode: C3064

Kafr Qadah (Arabic: كفرقدح) is a Syrian village located in the Hirbnafsah Subdistrict in Hama District. According to the Syria Central Bureau of Statistics (CBS), Kafr Qadah had a population of 1,049 in the 2004 census. Its inhabitants are predominantly Sunni Muslims.

== Bibliography ==
- Robinson, E.; Smith, E. (1841). Biblical Researches in Palestine, Mount Sinai and Arabia Petraea: A Journal of Travels in the year 1838. Vol. 3. Boston: Crocker & Brewster.
