= Haymaniyah =

Haymaniyah الهيمانية
- Village
- Location in Syria
- Coordinates: 35°29′34″N 37°15′16″E
- Country: Syria
- Governorate: Hama
- District: Hama
- Subdistrict: Hamraa

Population (2004)
  - Total: 138
- Time zone: UTC+3 (AST)
- City Qrya Pcode: C3097

Haymaniyah (Arabic: الهيمانية) is a Syrian village located in Al-Hamraa Nahiyah in Hama District, Hama. According to the Syria Central Bureau of Statistics (CBS), Haymaniyeh had a population of 138 in the 2004 census.
