= Umm Habes =

Um Habs أم حبس
- Village
- Location in Syria
- Coordinates: 35.451290°N 37.320007°E
- Country: Syria
- Governorate: Hama
- District: Hama District
- Subdistrict: Al-Hamraa Nahiyah

Population (2004)
  - Total: 543
- Time zone: UTC+3 (AST)
- City Qrya Pcode: N/A

Um Habs (Arabic: أم حبس) is a Syrian village located in Al-Hamraa Nahiyah in Hama District, Hama. According to the Syria Central Bureau of Statistics (CBS), Um Habs had a population of 543 in the 2004 census.
