= Al-Narjis =

Al-Narjis النرجس
- Village
- Country: Syria
- Governorate: Hama
- District: Hama
- Subdistrict: Hama

Population (2004)
  - Total: 8
- Time zone: UTC+3 (AST)
- City Qrya Pcode: N/A

Al-Narjis (Arabic: النرجس) is a Syrian farm located in the Subdistrict of the Hama District in the Hama Governorate. According to the Syria Central Bureau of Statistics (CBS), al-Narjis had a population of 8 in the 2004 census.
