= Al-Humayri =

Al-Humayri الحميري
- Village
- Location in Syria
- Coordinates: 34°58′27″N 36°30′11″E
- Country: Syria
- Governorate: Hama
- District: Hama
- Subdistrict: Hirbnafsah

Population (2004)
  - Total: 1,797
- Time zone: UTC+3 (AST)
- City Qrya Pcode: C3054

Al-Humayri (Arabic: الحميري) is a Syrian village located in the Hirbnafsah Subdistrict in Hama District. According to the Syria Central Bureau of Statistics (CBS), al-Humayri had a population of 1,797 in the 2004 census. Its inhabitants are predominantly Alawites.
