= Qufaylun =

Qufaylun قفيلون
- Village
- Location in Syria
- Coordinates: 34°58′10″N 36°28′40″E
- Country: Syria
- Governorate: Hama
- District: Hama
- Subdistrict: Hirbnafsah

Population (2004)
  - Total: 501
- Time zone: UTC+3 (AST)
- City Qrya Pcode: C3065

Qufaylun (Arabic: قفيلون) is a Syrian village located in the Hirbnafsah Subdistrict in Hama District. According to the Syria Central Bureau of Statistics (CBS), Qufaylun had a population of 501 in the 2004 census. Its inhabitants are predominantly Alawites.
