= Dali, Syria =

Dali دلة
- Village
- Location in Syria
- Coordinates: 35°29′46″N 37°10′44″E
- Country: Syria
- Governorate: Hama
- District: Hama
- Subdistrict: Hamraa

Population (2004)
  - Total: 535
- Time zone: UTC+3 (AST)
- City Qrya Pcode: C3070

Dali (Arabic: دلة) is a Syrian village located in Al-Hamraa Nahiyah in Hama District, Hama. According to the Syria Central Bureau of Statistics (CBS), Dalleh had a population of 535 in the 2004 census. During Syria civil war, Dalleh was captured by ISIS, then SAA captured this town on 6 February 2018.
