= Khirbet al-Qasr =

Khirbet al-Qasr خربة القصر
- Village
- Location in Syria
- Coordinates: 34°59′7″N 36°32′13″E
- Country: Syria
- Governorate: Hama
- District: Hama
- Subdistrict: Hirbnafsah

Population (2004)
  - Total: 1,007
- Time zone: UTC+3 (AST)
- City Qrya Pcode: C3058

Khirbet al-Qasr (Arabic: خربة القصر) is a Syrian village located in the Hirbnafsah Subdistrict in Hama District. According to the Syria Central Bureau of Statistics (CBS), Khirbet al-Qasr had a population of 1,007 in the 2004 census.
