= Amarat Aslan =

Amarat Aslan عمارة أصلان
- Village
- Location in Syria
- Coordinates: 34°59′59″N 36°52′10″E
- Country: Syria
- Governorate: Hama
- District: Hama
- Subdistrict: Hama

Population (2004)
  - Total: 746
- Time zone: UTC+3 (AST)
- City Qrya Pcode: C2997

Amarat Aslan (Arabic: عمارة أصلان) is a Syrian village located in the Hama Subdistrict of the Hama District in the Hama Governorate. According to the Syria Central Bureau of Statistics (CBS), Amarat Aslan had a population of 746 in the 2004 census.
