= Adabas, Hama =

Adabas, Hama عدبس
- Village
- Location in Syria
- Coordinates: 35.140967°N 36.596618°E
- Country: Syria
- Governorate: Hama
- District: Hama District
- Subdistrict: Hama Nahiyah

Population (2004)
  - Total: 933
- Time zone: UTC+3 (AST)
- City Qrya Pcode: C2982

Adabas, Hama (Arabic: عدبس) is a Syrian village located in Hama Nahiyah in Hama District in Hama. According to the Syria Central Bureau of Statistics (CBS), Adabas, Hama had a population of 933 in the 2004 census. By 2018, its population had increased to roughly 3,000 people.
