= Abu Ajwa =

Abu Ajwa أبو عجوة
- Village
- Location in Syria
- Coordinates: 35°22′9″N 37°12′0″E
- Country: Syria
- Governorate: Hama
- District: Hama
- Subdistrict: Hamraa

Population (2004)
  - Total: 693
- Time zone: UTC+3 (AST)
- City Qrya Pcode: C3098

Abu Ajwa (Arabic: أبو عجوة) is a Syrian village located in Al-Hamraa Nahiyah in Hama District, Hama. According to the Syria Central Bureau of Statistics (CBS), Abu Ajwa had a population of 693 in the 2004 census.
