= Ruhayyah =

Ruhayyah الرحية
- Village
- Location in Syria
- Coordinates: 35°14′40″N 37°6′20″E
- Country: Syria
- Governorate: Hama
- District: Hama
- Subdistrict: Hamraa

Population (2004)
  - Total: 1,715
- Time zone: UTC+3 (AST)
- City Qrya Pcode: C3082

Ruhayyah (Arabic: الرحية) is a Syrian village located in Al-Hamraa Nahiyah in Hama District, Hama, Syria. According to the Syria Central Bureau of Statistics (CBS), Rahya had a population of 1,715 in the 2004 census.

On 14 December 2024, six civilians were killed by a landmine while driving in the village.
