= Zor Taqsis =

Zor Taqsis زور تقسيس
- Village
- Location in Syria
- Coordinates: 35°0′34″N 36°52′59″E
- Country: Syria
- Governorate: Hama
- District: Hama
- Subdistrict: Hama

Population (2004)
  - Total: 1,112
- Time zone: UTC+3 (AST)
- City Qrya Pcode: N/A

Zor Taqsis (Arabic: زور تقسيس) is a Syrian village located in the Subdistrict of the Hama District in the Hama Governorate. According to the Syria Central Bureau of Statistics (CBS), Zor Taqsis had a population of 1,112 in the 2004 census.
