= Khirbet al-Jami =

Khirbet al-Jami' خربة الجامع
- Village
- Location in Syria
- Coordinates: 34°57′24″N 36°27′9″E
- Country: Syria
- Governorate: Hama
- District: Hama
- Subdistrict: Hirbnafsah

Population (2004)
  - Total: 1,078
- Time zone: UTC+3 (AST)
- City Qrya Pcode: C3062

Khirbet al-Jami′ (Arabic: خربة الجامع) is a Syrian village located in the Hirbnafsah Subdistrict in Hama District. According to the Syria Central Bureau of Statistics (CBS), Khirbet al-Jami′ had a population of 1,078 in the 2004 census. It is a predominantly Kurdish village.
