= Zor al-Sarmiyah =

Zor al-Sarmiyah زور الصارمية
- Village
- Location in Syria
- Coordinates: 35.233242°N 36.3838°E
- Country: Syria
- Governorate: Hama
- District: Hama
- Subdistrict: Hama

Population (2004)
  - Total: 538
- Time zone: UTC+3 (AST)
- City Qrya Pcode: N/A

Zor al-Sarmiyah (Arabic: زور الصارمية) is a Syrian village located in the Subdistrict of the Hama District in the Hama Governorate. According to the Syria Central Bureau of Statistics (CBS), Zor al-Sarmiyah had a population of 538 in the 2004 census.
