= Sawa, Hama =

Sawa صاوا
- Village
- Location in Syria
- Coordinates: 35.166564°N 36.518705°E
- Country: Syria
- Governorate: Hama
- District: Hama
- Subdistrict: Hama

Population (2004)
  - Total: 546
- Time zone: UTC+2 (EET)
  - Summer (DST): UTC+3 (EEST)
- City Qrya Pcode: C2996

Sawa, Hama (Arabic: صاوا) is a Syrian village located in the Subdistrict of the Hama District in the Hama Governorate. According to the Syria Central Bureau of Statistics (CBS), Sawa had a population of 546 in the 2004 census.
