= Muwaylah al-Sirwana =

Muwaylah al-Sirwana مويلح الصوارنة
- Village
- Location in Syria
- Coordinates: 35°20′24″N 37°8′34″E
- Country: Syria
- Governorate: Hama
- District: Hama
- Subdistrict: Hamraa

Population (2004)
  - Total: 700
- Time zone: UTC+3 (AST)
- City Qrya Pcode: C3106

Mweileh Elsirwana (Arabic: مويلح الصوارنة) is a Syrian village located in Al-Hamraa Nahiyah in Hama District, Hama. According to the Syria Central Bureau of Statistics (CBS), Mweileh Elsirwana had a population of 700 in the 2004 census.
