= Rasm Anz =

Rasm Anz رسم العنز
- Village
- Location in Syria
- Coordinates: 35°23′46″N 37°17′16″E
- Country: Syria
- Governorate: Hama
- District: Hama District
- Subdistrict: Al-Hamraa Nahiyah

Population (2004)
  - Total: 379
- Time zone: UTC+3 (AST)
- City Qrya Pcode: N/A

Rasm Anz (Arabic: رسم العنز) is a Syrian village located in Al-Hamraa Nahiyah in Hama District, Hama. According to the Syria Central Bureau of Statistics (CBS), Rasm Anz had a population of 379 in the 2004 census.
