= Tuwal Dabaghin =

Tuwal Dabaghin طوال دباغين
- Village
- Location in Syria
- Coordinates: 35°19′1″N 37°9′56″E
- Country: Syria
- Governorate: Hama
- District: Hama
- Subdistrict: Hamraa

Population (2004)
  - Total: 509
- Time zone: UTC+3 (AST)
- City Qrya Pcode: C3086

Twal Dabaghin (Arabic: طوال دباغين) is a Syrian village located in Al-Hamraa Nahiyah in Hama District, Hama. According to the Syria Central Bureau of Statistics (CBS), Twal Dabaghin had a population of 509 in the 2004 census.
