= Al-Nazaza =

Al-Nazaza النزازة
- Village
- Location in Syria
- Country: Syria
- Governorate: Hama
- District: Hama
- Subdistrict: Hama

Population (2004)
  - Total: 354
- Time zone: UTC+3 (AST)
- City Qrya Pcode: N/A

Al-Nazaza (Arabic: النزازة) is a Syrian village located in the Subdistrict of the Hama District in the Hama Governorate. According to the Syria Central Bureau of Statistics (CBS), al-Nazaza had a population of 354 in the 2004 census.
