= Abu Dardah =

Abu Dardah أبو دردة
- Village
- Location in Syria
- Coordinates: 34°59′2″N 36°49′15″E
- Country: Syria
- Governorate: Hama
- District: Hama District
- Subdistrict: Hama Nahiyah

Population (2004)
  - Total: 486
- Time zone: UTC+3 (AST)
- City Qrya Pcode: C2990

Abu Dardah (Arabic: أبو دردة) is a Syrian village located in Hama Nahiyah in Hama District in Hama. According to the Syria Central Bureau of Statistics (CBS), Abu Dardah had a population of 486 in the 2004 census.
