= Awja al-Janah =

Awja al-Janah عوجة الجنا
- Village
- Location in Syria
- Coordinates: 35°9′14″N 36°52′51″E
- Country: Syria
- Governorate: Hama
- District: Hama
- Subdistrict: Hama

Population (2004)
  - Total: 489
- Time zone: UTC+3 (AST)
- City Qrya Pcode: N/A

Awja al-Janah (Arabic: عوجة الجنا; also spelled Awj al-Janah or A'waj al-Jana) is a village in central Syria, administratively part of the Hama Governorate. According to the Syria Central Bureau of Statistics (CBS), Awja al-Janah had a population of 489 in the 2004 census. Its inhabitants are Sunni Muslims.

== History ==
In the late 19th or early 20th centuries, Awja al-Janah was sold by the Bani Khalid, a partly Bedouin tribe in central Syria to the Barazi, a prominent landowning family from Hama. Its inhabitants were Sunni Muslim tenant farmers.

== Bibliography ==
- Comité de l'Asie française (April 1933). "Notes sur la propriété foncière dans le Syrie centrale (Notes on Landownership in Central Syria)". Bulletin du Comité de l'Asie française (in French). 33 (309). Comité de l'Asie française: 130–136.
