= Umm Zahmak =

Umm Zahmak أم زهمك
- Village
- Location in Syria
- Coordinates: 35°27′13″N 37°14′15″E
- Country: Syria
- Governorate: Hama
- District: Hama
- Subdistrict: Hamraa

Population (2004)
  - Total: 306
- Time zone: UTC+3 (AST)
- City Qrya Pcode: C3079

Um Zahmak (Arabic: أم زهمك) is a Syrian village located in Al-Hamraa Nahiyah in Hama District, Hama. According to the Syria Central Bureau of Statistics (CBS), Um Zahmak had a population of 306 in the 2004 census.
