= Al-Tulaysiyah al-Janubiyah =

Al-Tulaysiyah al-Janubiyah الطليسية الجنوبية
- Village
- Country: Syria
- Governorate: Hama
- District: Hama
- Subdistrict: Hirbnafsah

Population (2004)
  - Total: 563
- Time zone: UTC+3 (AST)
- City Qrya Pcode: N/A

Al-Tulaysiyah al-Janubiyah (Arabic: الطليسية الجنوبية) is a Syrian village located in the Hirbnafsah Subdistrict in Hama District. According to the Syria Central Bureau of Statistics (CBS), al-Tulaysiyah al-Janubiyah had a population of 563 in the 2004 census.
