= Umm Turaykiyah =

Umm Turaykiyah al-Qibliyah أم تريكية القبلية
- Village
- Location in Syria
- Coordinates: 35°24′12″N 36°56′25″E
- Country: Syria
- Governorate: Hama
- District: Hama
- Subdistrict: Hamraa

Population (2004)
  - Total: 832
- Time zone: UTC+3 (AST)
- City Qrya Pcode: C3081

Um Treikiet Elqablieh (Arabic: أم تريكية القبلية) is a Syrian village located in Al-Hamraa Nahiyah in Hama District, Hama. According to the Syria Central Bureau of Statistics (CBS), it had a population of 832 in the 2004 census. Its inhabitants are Alawites, many of whom have bee displaced from the village since February 2025.
