= Bayud =

Bayud بيوض
- Village
- Location in Syria
- Coordinates: 35°28′38″N 37°12′6″E
- Country: Syria
- Governorate: Hama
- District: Hama
- Subdistrict: Hamraa

Population (2004)
  - Total: 737
- Time zone: UTC+3 (AST)
- City Qrya Pcode: C3068

Bayud (Arabic: بيوض) is a Syrian village located in Al-Hamraa Nahiyah in Hama District, Hama. According to the Syria Central Bureau of Statistics (CBS), Bayud had a population of 737 in the 2004 census. During Syria civil war, Bayud was captured by ISIS, then SAA liberated this town from ISIS on 5 February 2018.
