= Maqtaa al-Hajar =

Maqtaa al-Hajar مقطع الحجر
- Village
- Location in Syria
- Coordinates: 35°5′36.9″N 36°42′4″E
- Country: Syria
- Governorate: Hama
- District: Hama
- Subdistrict: Hama

Population (2004)
  - Total: 1,106
- Time zone: UTC+3 (AST)
- City Qrya Pcode: C3007

Maqtaa al-Hajar (Arabic: مقطع الحجر) is a Syrian village located in the Subdistrict of the Hama District in the Hama Governorate. According to the Syria Central Bureau of Statistics (CBS), Maqtaa al-Hajar had a population of 1,106 in the 2004 census.
