= Tarfawi =

Tarfawi الطرفاوي
- Village
- Location in Syria
- Coordinates: 35°32′3″N 37°12′19″E
- Country: Syria
- Governorate: Hama
- District: Hama
- Subdistrict: Hamraa

Population (2004)
  - Total: 493
- Time zone: UTC+2 (EET)
  - Summer (DST): UTC+3 (EEST)
- City Qrya Pcode: C3093

Tarfawi (Arabic: الطرفاوي) is a Syrian village located in Al-Hamraa Nahiyah in Hama District, Hama. According to the Syria Central Bureau of Statistics (CBS), Tarfawi had a population of 493 in the 2004 census.

The village came under the control of the Islamic State on 3 July 2016 after a counter-attack against the Syrian Arab Army.
