= Halabiyah =

Halabia الحليبية
- Village
- Location in Syria
- Coordinates: 35.535220°N 37.297816°E
- Country: Syria
- Governorate: Hama
- District: Hama District
- Subdistrict: Al-Hamraa Nahiyah

Population (2004)
  - Total: 686
- Time zone: UTC+3 (AST)
- City Qrya Pcode: N/A

Halabia (Arabic: الحليبية) is a Syrian village located in Al-Hamraa Nahiyah in Hama District, Hama. According to the Syria Central Bureau of Statistics (CBS), Halabia had a population of 686 in the 2004 census. During the Syrian civil war, Halabia was captured by ISIS, then on 6 February 2018, SAA liberated this town.
