= Tharwat, Syria =

Tharut ثروت
- Village
- Location in Syria
- Coordinates: 35.402972°N 37.306352°E
- Country: Syria
- Governorate: Hama
- District: Hama District
- Subdistrict: Al-Hamraa Nahiyah

Population (2004)
  - Total: 990
- Time zone: UTC+3 (AST)
- City Qrya Pcode: C3073

Tharut (Arabic: ثروت tharūt) is a Syrian village located in Al-Hamraa Nahiyah in Hama District, Hama. According to the Syria Central Bureau of Statistics (CBS), the village had a population of 990 in the 2004 census.
