= Ma'an, Syria =

Ma'an معان
- Town
- Location in Syria
- Coordinates: 35.359586°N 36.795702°E
- Country: Syria
- Governorate: Hama
- District: Hama
- Subdistrict: Suran

Population (2004)
  - Total: 1,561
- Time zone: UTC+3 (AST)

Ma'an (Arabic: معان, also spelled Maan) is a town in northern Syria, administratively part of the Hama Governorate, located north of Hama. Nearby localities include Suran to the southwest, Murik to the northwest, al-Tamanah to the north, Atshan to the northeast, Tuleisa to the east, Fan al-Shamali to the southeast and Kawkab to the south. According to the Syria Central Bureau of Statistics, Ma'an had a population of 1,561 in the 2004 census. Its inhabitants are predominantly Alawites.

== History ==
Ma'an was sold by the Mawali, a semi-Bedouin tribe in central Syria, to the Kaylani notable family of Hama. The inhabitants of Ma'an, as of the early 1930s, were Sunni Muslim Arab tenant farmers. By a later point, the majority of the inhabitants were Alawites. The Kaylani family sold it to a citizen of Lebanon, who later sold most of its lands to the local farmers before the 1958 Agrarian Reform Laws, which redistributed lands to the peasants across Syria. The palace of the original owner the village remains standing. Built of basaltic stone, it consists of two stories and contains warehouses, stables, kitchens and a courtyard.

The village was connected to the electric grid in 1977. In 1990, a municipality was established to administer the village. As of 2010, pistachio orchards spanned about 80% of Ma'an's lands and pistachio, olive and grape cultivation and poultry farming represented the village's main economic activity.

In late December 2012, during the Syrian civil war, Islamist rebel fighters from the al-Nusra Front took over large parts of the town as part of a wider offensive in the Hama Governorate. During the battle, 11 rebels and 20 Syrian Army soldiers were killed. It was the site of the Maan massacre in 2014. On 13 October 2016 the town was recaptured by the Syrian Arab Army.

== Bibliography ==
- Cole, Ben (2022). The Syrian Information and Propaganda War: The Role of Cognitive Bias. Cham, Switzerland: Palgrave Macmillan. ISBN 978-3-030-93281-7.
- Comité de l'Asie française (April 1933). "Notes sur la propriété foncière dans le Syrie centrale (Notes on Landownership in Central Syria)". Bulletin du Comité de l'Asie française (in French). 33 (309). Comité de l'Asie française: 130–136.
