= Zor Abu Dardah =

Zor Abu Dardaa al-Nashmi زور أبو دردة النشمي
- Village
- Location in Syria
- Coordinates: 34°57′55″N 36°49′37″E
- Country: Syria
- Governorate: Hama
- District: Hama
- Subdistrict: Hama

Population (2004)
  - Total: 302
- Time zone: UTC+3 (AST)
- City Qrya Pcode: C2973

Zor Abu Dardaa al-Nashmi (Arabic: زور أبو دردة النشمي) is a Syrian village located in the Subdistrict of the Hama District in the Hama Governorate. According to the Syria Central Bureau of Statistics (CBS), Zor Abu Dardaa al-Nashmi had a population of 302 in the 2004 census.
