= Jubb al-Safa, Hama =

Jubb al-Safa جب الصفا
- Village
- Location in Syria
- Coordinates: 35°26′28″N 37°10′7″E
- Country: Syria
- Governorate: Hama
- District: Hama District
- Subdistrict: Al-Hamraa Nahiyah

Population (2004)
  - Total: 1,305
- Time zone: UTC+3 (AST)
- City Qrya Pcode: C3083

Jeb Elsafa (Arabic: جب الصفا) is a Syrian village located in Al-Hamraa Nahiyah in Hama District, Hama. According to the Syria Central Bureau of Statistics (CBS), Jeb Elsafa had a population of 1305 in the 2004 census.
