= Al-Ala, Syria =

Alala, Hama الْأَلَا
- Village
- Location in Syria
- Coordinates: 35.307503°N 37.106770°E
- Country: Syria
- Governorate: Hama
- District: Hama District
- Subdistrict: Al-Hamraa Nahiyah

Population (2004)
  - Total: 571
- Time zone: UTC+3 (AST)
- City Qrya Pcode: C3072

Alala, Hama (Arabic: الْأَلَا, romanized: al-ʾAlā) is a Syrian village located in Al-Hamraa Nahiyah in Hama District, Hama. According to the Syria Central Bureau of Statistics (CBS), Alala, Hama had a population of 571 in the 2004 census.
