= Abu Mansaf =

Abu Mansaf أبو منسف
- Village
- Location in Syria
- Coordinates: 35°15′57″N 36°52′20″E
- Country: Syria
- Governorate: Hama
- District: Hama
- Subdistrict: Hama

Population (2004)
  - Total: 364
- Time zone: UTC+3 (AST)
- City Qrya Pcode: C2978

Abu Mansaf (Arabic: أبو منسف) is a Syrian village located in the Hama Subdistrict of the Hama District in the Hama Governorate. According to the Syria Central Bureau of Statistics (CBS), Abu Mansaf had a population of 364 in the 2004 census.
