= Maaloula, Hama =

Mlolah ملولح
- Village
- Location in Syria
- Coordinates: 35°29′18″N 37°12′15″E
- Country: Syria
- Governorate: Hama
- District: Hama
- Subdistrict: Hamraa

Population (2004)
  - Total: 377
- Time zone: UTC+3 (AST)
- City Qrya Pcode: C3108

Mlolah (IPA: Mlōlaḥ) (Arabic: ملولح) is a Syrian village located in Al-Hamraa Nahiyah in Hama District, Hama. According to the Syria Central Bureau of Statistics (CBS), Mlolah had a population of 377 in the 2004 census. During the Syrian civil war, Mlolah was captured by ISIS, then on 6 February 2018, SAA captured this town. As of 23 February 2025, the village was uninhabited.
