= Al-Suwayda al-Gharbiyah =

Al-Suwayda al-Gharbiyah السويدة الغربية
- Village
- Location in Syria
- Coordinates: 34°59′23″N 36°43′35″E
- Country: Syria
- Governorate: Hama
- District: Hama
- Subdistrict: Hama

Population (2004)
  - Total: 522
- Time zone: UTC+2 (EET)
  - Summer (DST): UTC+3 (EEST)
- City Qrya Pcode: C2985

Al-Suwayda al-Gharbiya (Arabic: السويدة الغربية) is a Syrian village located in the Subdistrict of the Hama District in the Hama Governorate. According to the Syria Central Bureau of Statistics (CBS), al-Suwayda al-Gharbiyah had a population of 522 in the 2004 census. Its inhabitants are predominantly Sunni Muslims.

== Bibliography ==
- Smith, Eli; Robinson, Edward (1841). Biblical Researches in Palestine, Mount Sinai and Arabia Petraea: A Journal of Travels in the Year 1838. Vol. 3. Crocker and Brewster.
