= Raabun =

Raabun رعبون
- Village
- Location in Syria
- Coordinates: 35°5′49″N 36°49′26″E
- Country: Syria
- Governorate: Hama
- District: Hama
- Subdistrict: Hama

Population (2004)
  - Total: 387
- Time zone: UTC+3 (AST)
- City Qrya Pcode: C2961

Raabun (Arabic: رعبون) is a Syrian village located in the Subdistrict of the Hama District in the Hama Governorate. According to the Syria Central Bureau of Statistics (CBS), Raabun had a population of 387 in the 2004 census.
