= Tulayhat =

Tleihat طليحات
- Village
- Location in Syria
- Coordinates: 35.314792°N 37.280602°E
- Country: Syria
- Governorate: Hama
- District: Hama District
- Subdistrict: Al-Hamraa Nahiyah

Population (2004)
  - Total: 1,306
- Time zone: UTC+3 (AST)
- City Qrya Pcode: C3087

Tleihat (Arabic: طليحات) is a Syrian village located in Al-Hamraa Nahiyah in Hama District, Hama. According to the Syria Central Bureau of Statistics (CBS), Tleihat had a population of 1,306 in the 2004 census.
