= Al-Hashimiyah, Hama =

Al-Hashimiyah الهاشمية
- Village
- Location in Syria
- Coordinates: 35°10′37″N 36°47′16″E
- Country: Syria
- Governorate: Hama
- District: Hama
- Subdistrict: Hama

Population (2004)
  - Total: 102
- Time zone: UTC+3 (AST)
- City Qrya Pcode: C2966

Al-Hashimiyah (Arabic: الهاشمية) is a Syrian village located in the Subdistrict of the Hama District in the Hama Governorate. According to the Syria Central Bureau of Statistics (CBS), al-Hashimiyah had a population of 102 in the 2004 census.
