= Janat al-Sawarnah =

Janat Elsawarneh جناة الصوارنة
- Village
- Location in Syria
- Coordinates: 35.535220°N 37.297816°E
- Country: Syria
- Governorate: Hama
- District: Hama District
- Subdistrict: Al-Hamraa Nahiyah

Population (2004)
  - Total: 1,318
- Time zone: UTC+3 (AST)
- City Qrya Pcode: C3080

Janat Elsawarneh (Arabic: جناة الصوارنة) is a Syrian village located in Al-Hamraa Nahiyah in Hama District, Hama. According to the Syria Central Bureau of Statistics (CBS), Janat Elsawarneh had a population of 1318 in the 2004 census.
