= Juziyah =

Juziyah الجوزية الجرنية Jurniyah
- Village
- Location in Syria
- Coordinates: 35°2′35″N 36°51′49″E
- Country: Syria
- Governorate: Hama
- District: Hama
- Subdistrict: Hama

Population (2004)
  - Total: 2,434
- Time zone: UTC+3 (AST)
- City Qrya Pcode: C2968

Juziyah (Arabic: الجوزية) also called Jurniyah (Arabic: الجرنية) is a Syrian village located on the Orontes River in the Subdistrict of the Hama District in the Hama Governorate. According to the Syria Central Bureau of Statistics (CBS), Juziyah had a population of 2,434 in the 2004 census.
