= Jumaqliyah =

Jumaqliyah الجومقلية
- Village
- Location in Syria
- Coordinates: 34°58′17″N 36°51′21″E
- Country: Syria
- Governorate: Hama
- District: Hama
- Subdistrict: Hama

Population (2004)
  - Total: 1,064
- Time zone: UTC+3 (AST)
- City Qrya Pcode: C2986

Jumaqliyah (Arabic: الجومقلية) is a Syrian village located in the Subdistrict of the Hama District in the Hama Governorate. According to the Syria Central Bureau of Statistics (CBS), Jumaqliyah had a population of 1,064 in the 2004 census. Its inhabitants are predominantly Sunni Muslims of Kurdish origin.

== Bibliography ==
- Smith, Eli; Robinson, Edward (1841). Biblical Researches in Palestine, Mount Sinai and Arabia Petraea: A Journal of Travels in the Year 1838. Vol. 3. Crocker and Brewster.
