= Rasm al-Daheriyah =

Rasm Eldaheriyeh رسم الضاهرية
- Village
- Location in Syria
- Coordinates: 35.422650°N 37.278207°E
- Country: Syria
- Governorate: Hama
- District: Hama District
- Subdistrict: Al-Hamraa Nahiyah

Population (2004)
  - Total: 469
- Time zone: UTC+3 (AST)
- City Qrya Pcode: C3071

Rasm Eldaheriyeh (Arabic: رسم الضاهرية) is a Syrian village located in Al-Hamraa Nahiyah in Hama District, Hama. According to the Syria Central Bureau of Statistics (CBS), Rasm Eldaheriyeh had a population of 469 in the 2004 census.
