= Tell al-Nahr =

Tell al-Nahr تل النهر
- Village
- Location in Syria
- Coordinates: 35°14′32″N 36°28′11″E
- Country: Syria
- Governorate: Hama
- District: Hama
- Subdistrict: Hama

Population (2004)
  - Total: 1,507
- Time zone: UTC+3 (AST)
- City Qrya Pcode: C2998

Tell al-Nahr (Arabic: تل النهر) is a Syrian village located in the Subdistrict of the Hama District in the Hama Governorate. According to the Syria Central Bureau of Statistics (CBS), Tell al-Nahr had a population of 1,507 in the 2004 census.
