= Jadduah Shamaliyah =

Jadduah Shamaliyah جدوعة شمالية
- Village
- Location in Syria
- Coordinates: 35°33′36″N 37°13′57″E
- Country: Syria
- Governorate: Hama
- District: Hama
- Subdistrict: Hamraa

Population (2004)
  - Total: 737
- Time zone: UTC+3 (AST)
- City Qrya Pcode: C3088

Jadduah Shamalia (Arabic: جدوعة شمالية) is a Syrian village located in Al-Hamraa Nahiyah in Hama District, Hama. According to the Syria Central Bureau of Statistics (CBS), Jadduah Shamalia had a population of 737 in the 2004 census.
