= Rabda =

Rabda ربدة
- Village
- Location in Syria
- Coordinates: 35°23′9″N 37°3′11″E
- Country: Syria
- Governorate: Hama
- District: Hama
- Subdistrict: Hamraa

Population (2004)
  - Total: 642
- Time zone: UTC+3 (AST)
- City Qrya Pcode: C3069

Rabda (Arabic: ربدة) is a Syrian village located in Al-Hamraa Nahiyah in Hama District, Hama. According to the Syria Central Bureau of Statistics (CBS), Rabda had a population of 642 in the 2004 census.

As of 9 February 2025, the village was uninhabited.
