= Qasr Ibn Wardan =

Qasr Ibn Wardan قصر ابن وردان
- Village
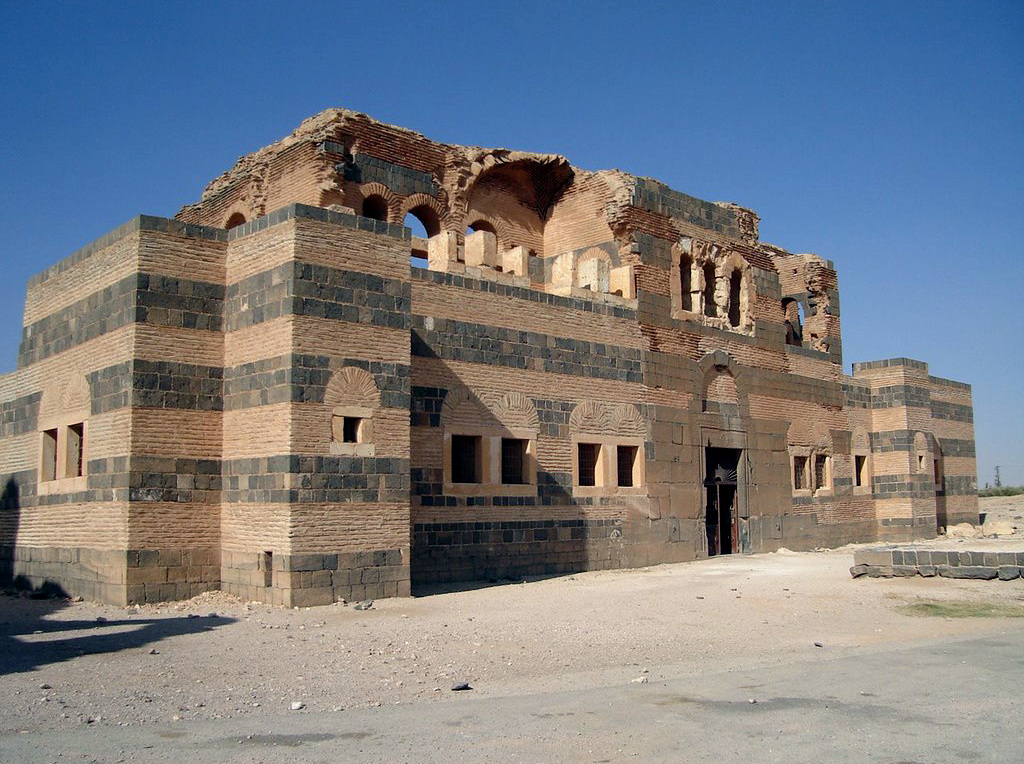
- Remains of the Byzantine palace at Qasr Ibn Wardan

- Location in Syria
- Coordinates: 35.37352283890921°N 37.24739786434708°E
- Country: Syria
- Governorate: Hama
- District: Hama
- Subdistrict: Hamraa

Population (2004)
  - Total: 467
- Time zone: UTC+3 (AST)
- City Qrya Pcode: C3105

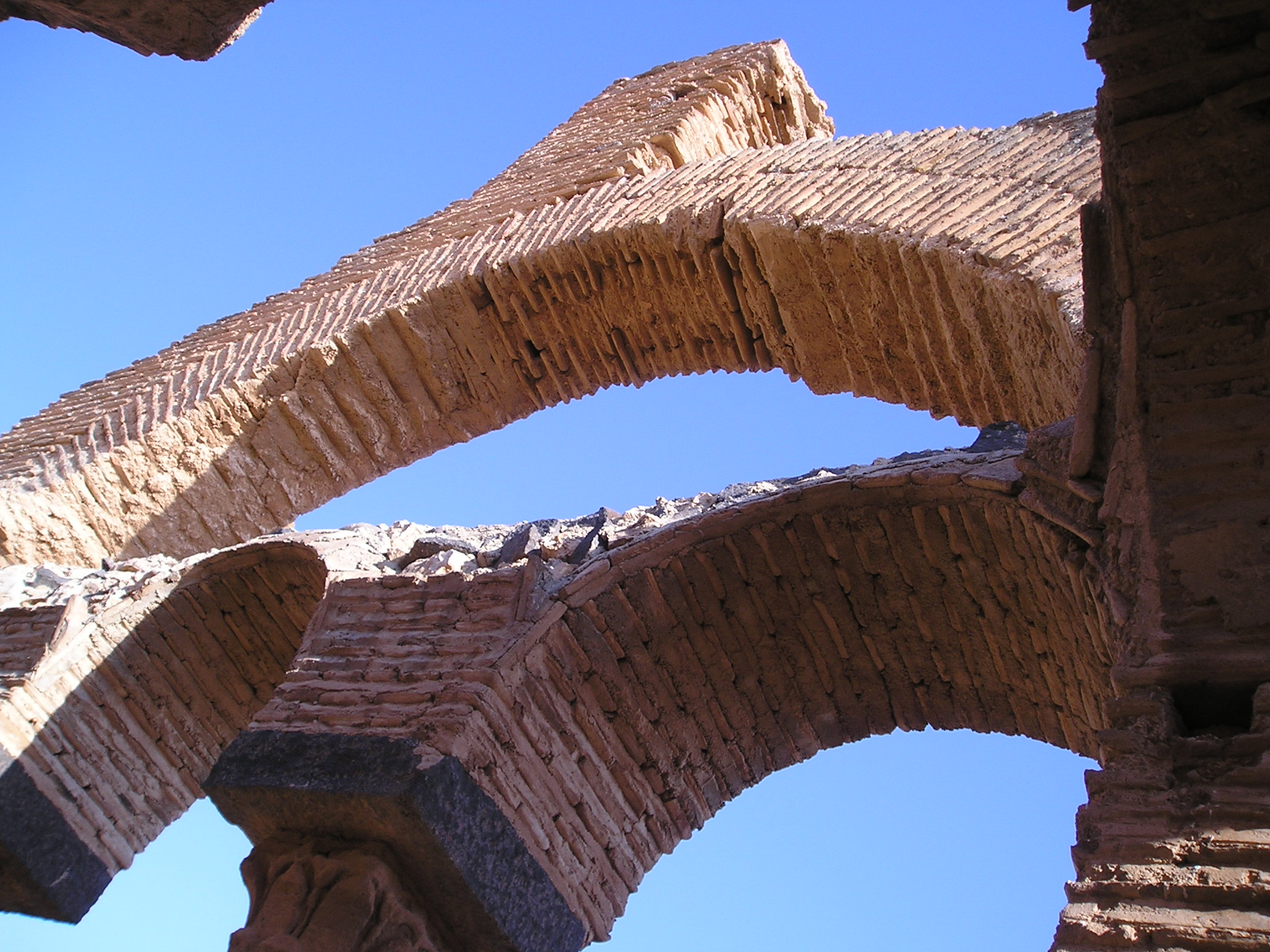
Preserved arches of the church

Qasr Ibn Wardan (Arabic: قصر ابن وردان) is a hamlet and 6th-century archaeological site located in the Syrian Desert, approximately 60 kilometres (37 mi) northeast from Hama and about 19 kilometres (12 mi) northeast of al-Hamraa. The hamlet is separated from the Byzantine-era ruins by a road, with the former situated to the east of the road and the ruins situated to the west. According to the Syria Central Bureau of Statistics (CBS), Qasr Ibn Wardan had a population of 467 in the 2004 census.

== Archaeology ==
The complex of a palace, church and barracks was erected in the mid-6th century by Byzantine Emperor Justinian I (r. 527–565) as a part of a defensive line (together with Resafa and Halabiye) against the Sassanid Empire. Its unique style, imported directly from Constantinople and not found anywhere else in present-day Syria, was probably chosen to impress local Bedouin tribes and to consolidate control over them. Basalt was brought from areas far north or south from the site and marble columns and capitals are thought to have been brought from Apamea.

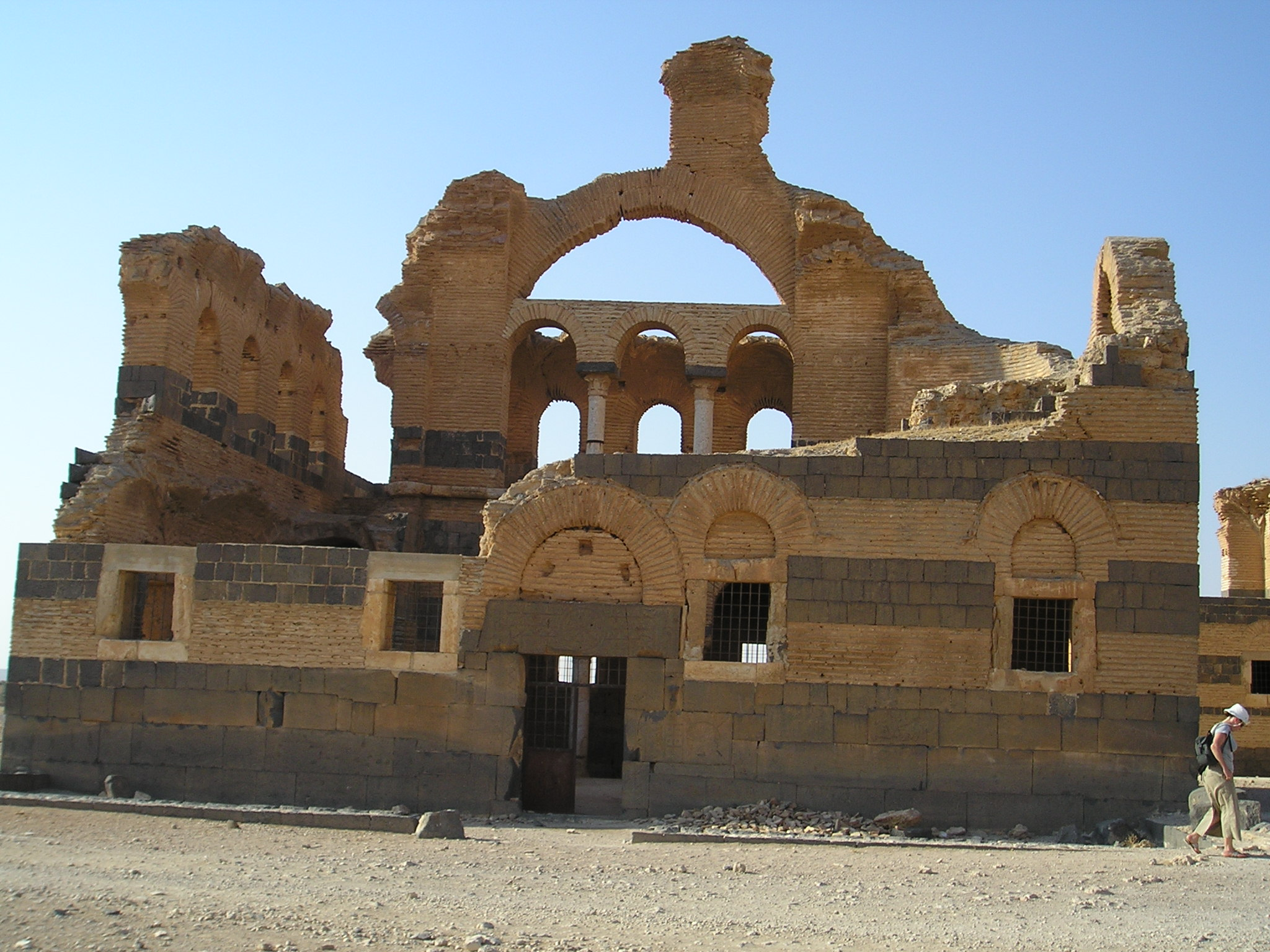
Remains of the church

Nothing remains of the barracks today. The palace was probably the local governor's residence as well. Its best-preserved part is the southern façade of alternating bands of basalt black and brick yellow. There are remains of stables in the northern part of the site and a small bath complex at the eastern part of the palace with a central courtyard. The function of each room was indicated by a carved stone.

The church was square-shaped with a central nave and two side aisles. Its remains currently stand just west of the palace and is architecturally similar to it, but a slightly smaller. Originally, the church was topped by a large dome (only a pendentive remains until today) and displays an example of early Byzantine dome-building techniques. Originally, three sides of the church (only northern and southern walls remain) had upper floor galleries reserved for women. The fourth side is finished by a typical Byzantine semicircular and half-domed apse.

== Syrian Civil War ==
The town and historical site was recaptured and secured by the SAA on 8 February 2018 from ISIS.

== Sources ==
- Burns, Ross. Monuments of Syria. I.B.Tauris. p. 201.
