= Aziziyah, Hama =

Al-Aziziyah العزيزية
- Village
- Location in Syria
- Coordinates: 35°30′48″N 37°11′5″E
- Country: Syria
- Governorate: Hama
- District: Hama
- Subdistrict: Hama

Population (2004)
  - Total: 533
- Time zone: UTC+3 (AST)
- City Qrya Pcode: C3085

Al-Aziziyah (Arabic: العزيزية) is a Syrian village located in Al-Hamraa Nahiyah in Hama District, Hama. According to the Syria Central Bureau of Statistics (CBS), Aziziyeh, Hama had a population of 533 in the 2004 census. During Syria Civil War, Al-Aziziyah was captured by ISIS from Opposition, then on 6 February 2018, Al-Aziziyah was liberated by SAA.
