= Al-Samaqiyah al-Qibliyah =

Al-Samaqiyah al-Qibliyah السماقية القبلية
- Village
- Location in Syria
- Coordinates: 35°18′18″N 37°0′42″E
- Country: Syria
- Governorate: Hama
- District: Hama
- Subdistrict: Hamraa

Population (2004)
  - Total: 748
- Time zone: UTC+2 (EET)
  - Summer (DST): UTC+3 (EEST)
- City Qrya Pcode: C3099

Smaqiyeh Qabliyeh (Arabic: السماقية القبلية) is a Syrian village located in Al-Hamraa Nahiyah in Hama District, Hama. According to the Syria Central Bureau of Statistics (CBS), Smaqiyeh Qabliyeh had a population of 748 in the 2004 census.
