= Influences upon Gothic architecture =

The Gothic style of architecture was strongly influenced by the Romanesque architecture which preceded it. Why the Gothic style emerged from Romanesque, and what the key influences on its development were, is a difficult problem for which there is a lack of concrete evidence because medieval Gothic architecture was not accompanied by contemporary written theory, in contrast to the 'Renaissance' and its treatises. A number of contrasting theories on the origins of Gothic have been advanced: for example, that Gothic emerged organically as a 'rationalist' answer to structural challenges; that Gothic was informed by the methods of medieval Scholastic philosophy; that Gothic was an attempt to imitate heaven and the light referred to in various Biblical passages such as Revelation; that Gothic was 'medieval modernism' deliberately rejecting the 'historicist' forms of classical architecture. Beyond specific theories, the style was also shaped by the specific geographical, political, religious and cultural context of Europe in the 12th century onwards (the 'first' Gothic building is considered to have been St Denis, in France in the 1140s by scholarly consensus).

Cathedrals in their cityscapes

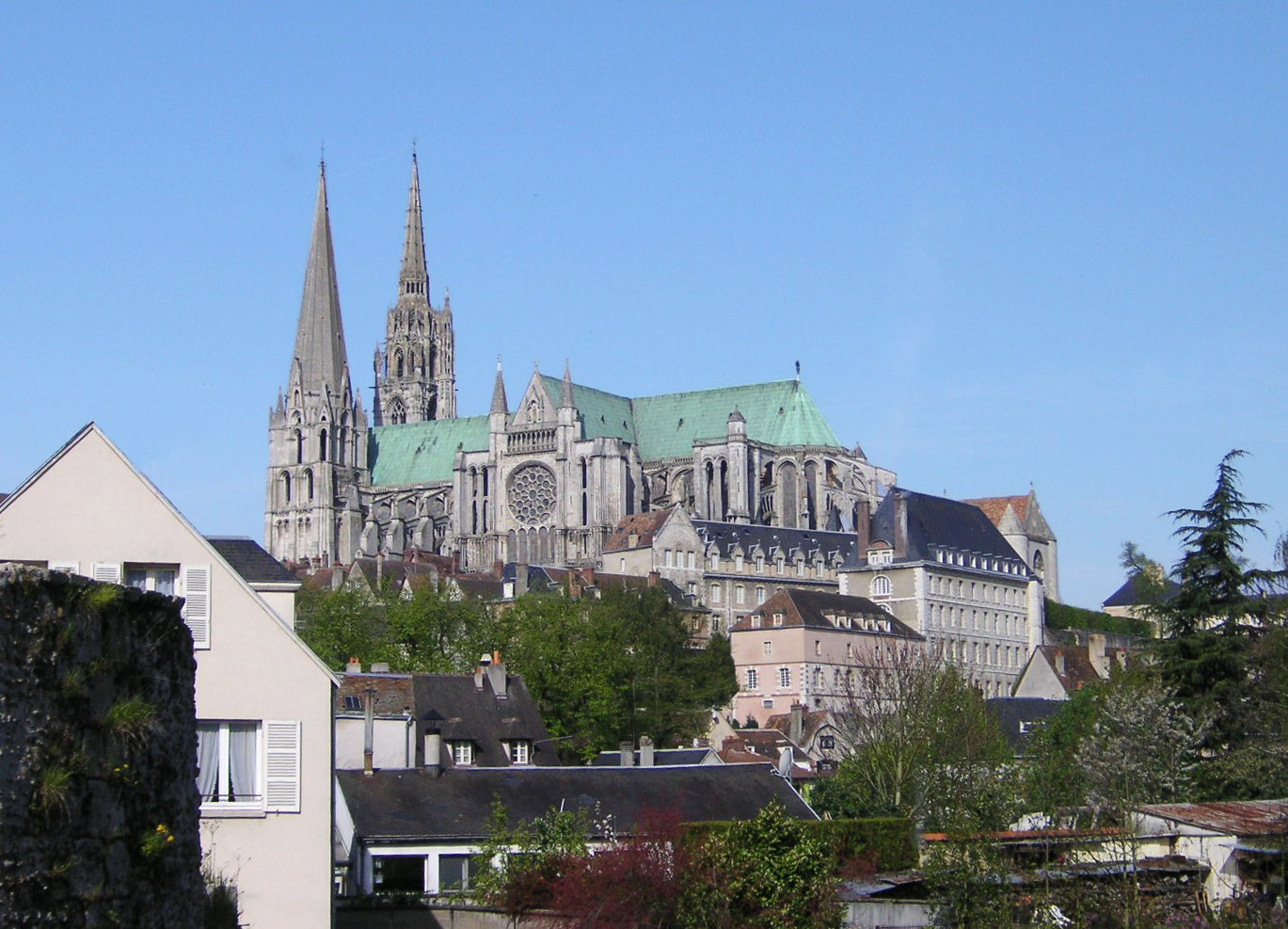
Chartres Cathedral, France

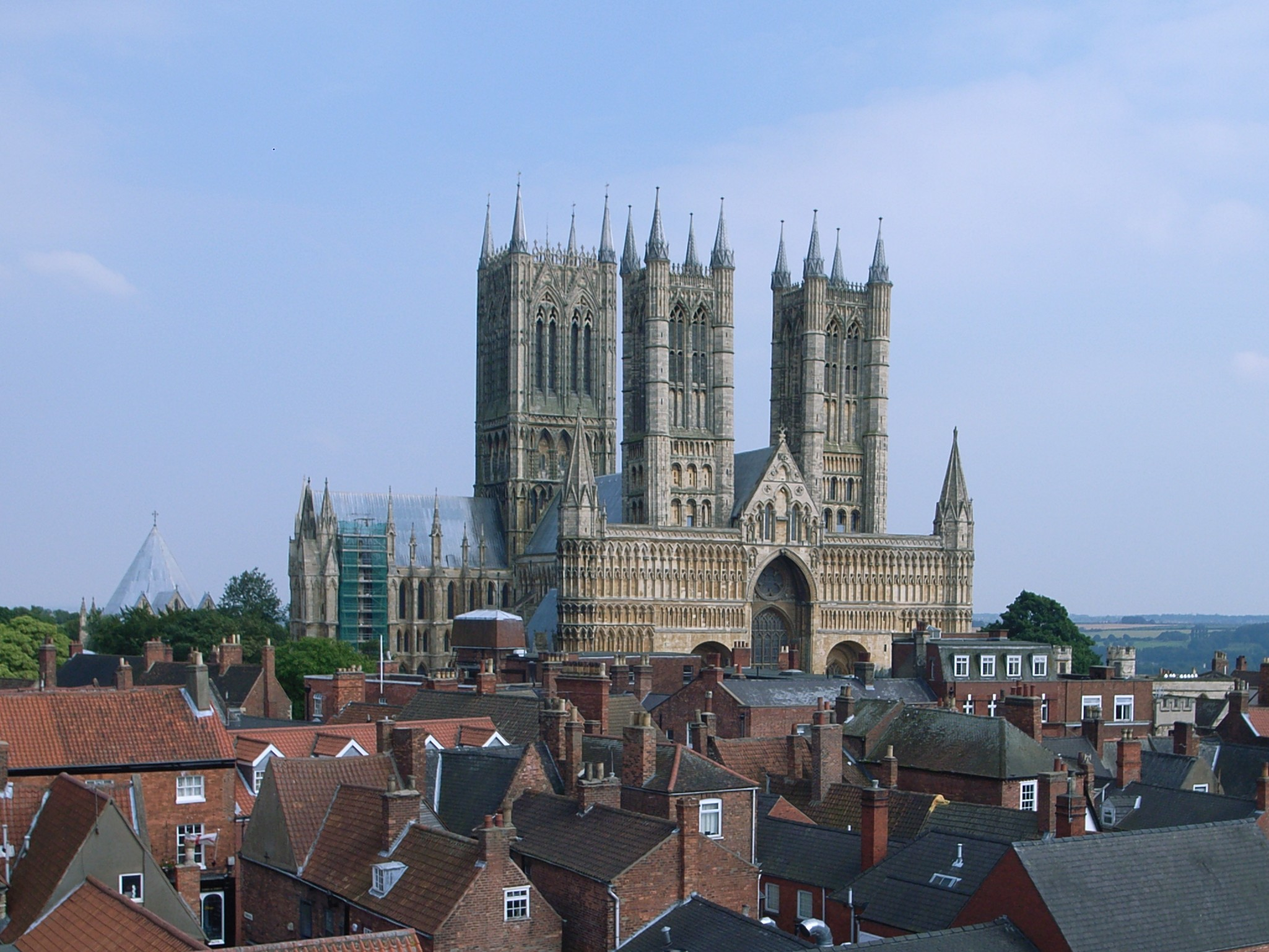
Lincoln Cathedral, England

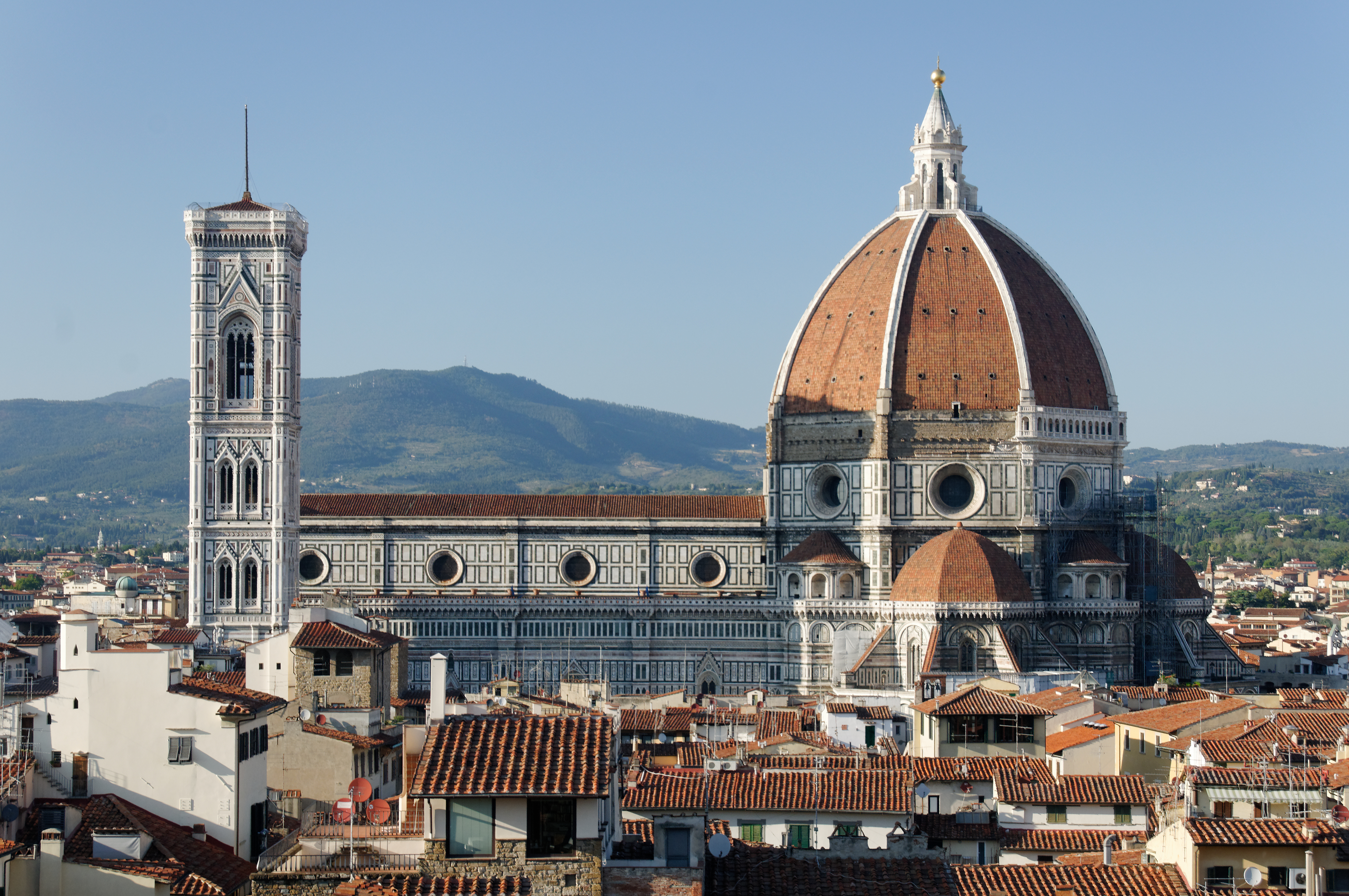
Florence Cathedral, Italy (Note: While the engineering and construction of the dome of Florence Cathedral by Brunelleschi is often cited as one of the first works of the Renaissance, the octagonal plan, ribs and pointed silhouette were already determined in the 14th century.)

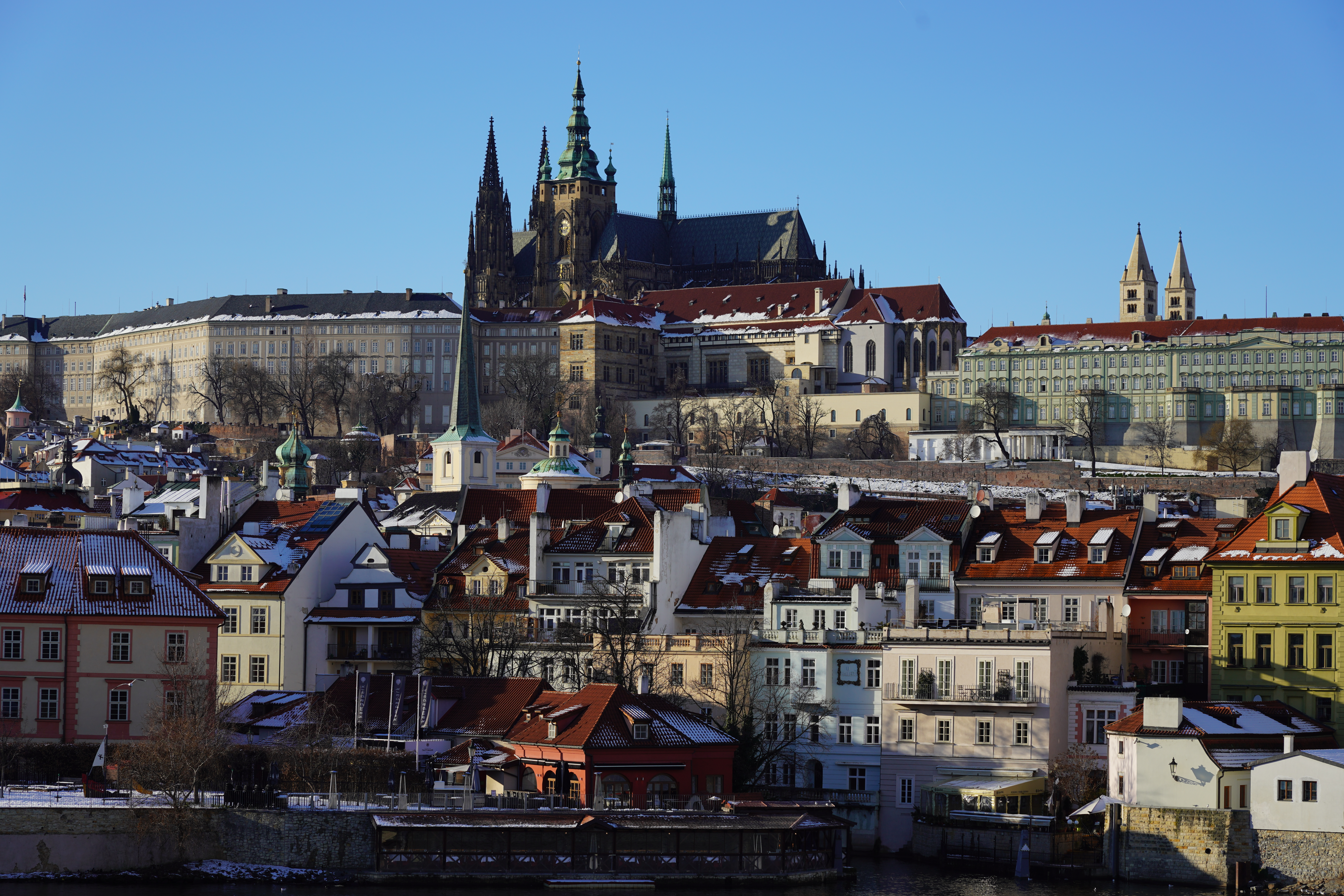
Prague Cathedral, Bohemia (Note: The Gothic south tower is surmounted by a Baroque spire.)

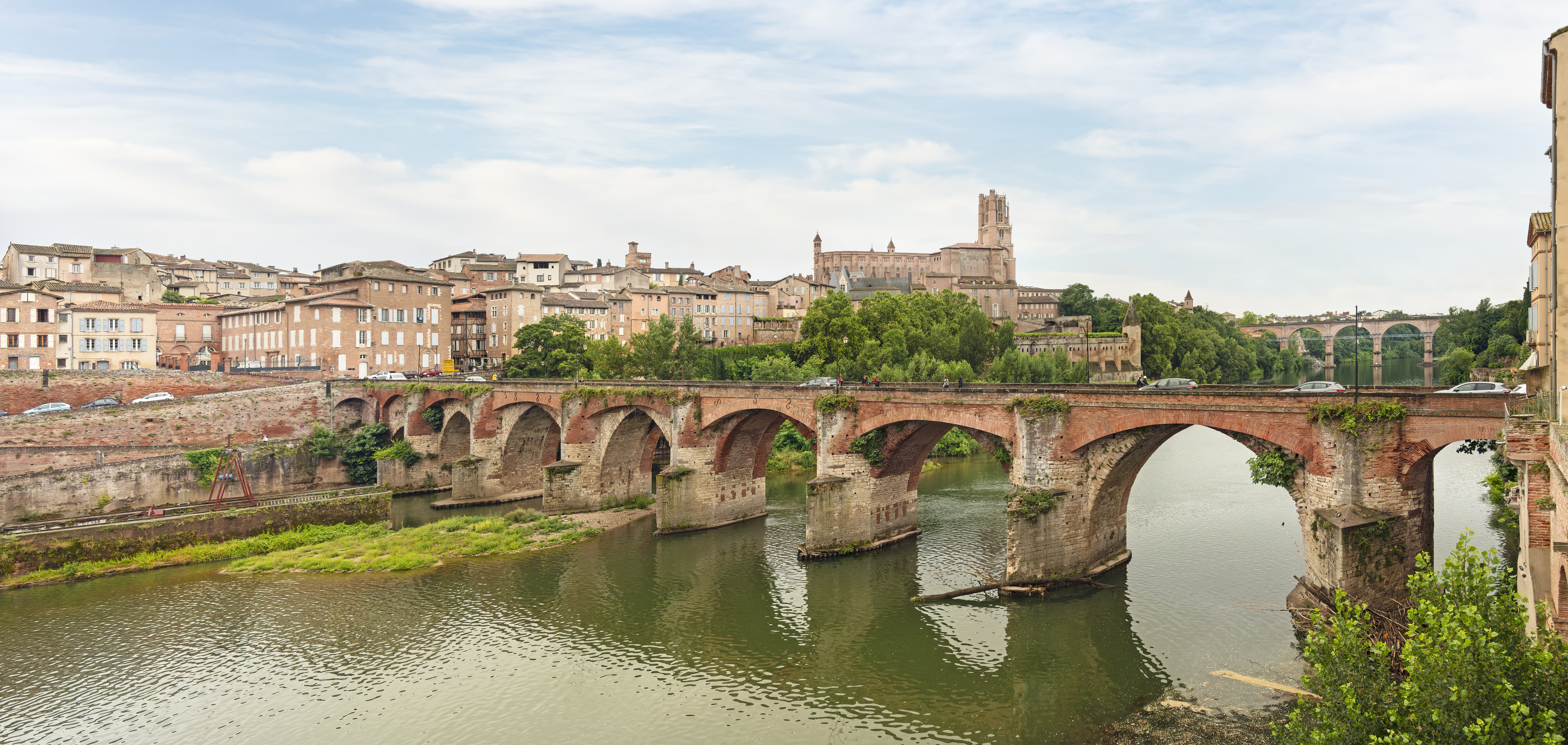
Albi Cathedral, France

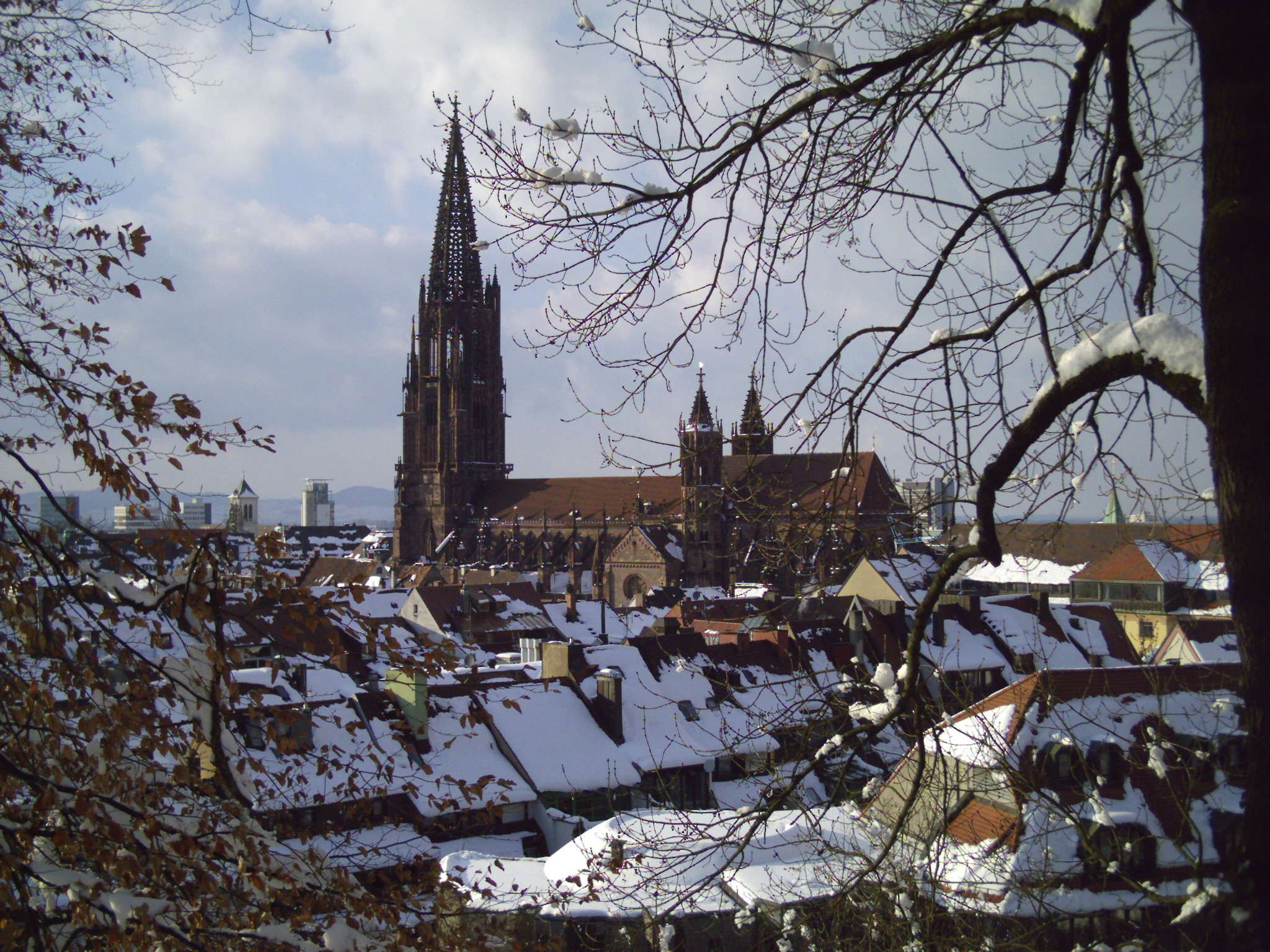
Freiburg Minster, Germany

== Political ==
At the end of the 12th century, Europe was divided into a multitude of city states and kingdoms. The area encompassing modern Germany, southern Denmark, the Netherlands, Belgium, Luxembourg, Switzerland, Austria, Czech Republic and much of northern Italy (excluding Venice and Papal States) was nominally part of the Holy Roman Empire, but local rulers exercised considerable autonomy. France, Denmark, Poland, Hungary, Portugal, Scotland, Castile, Aragon, Navarre, and Cyprus were independent kingdoms, as was the Angevin Empire, whose Plantagenet kings ruled England and large domains in what was to become modern France. Norway came under the influence of England, while the other Scandinavian countries and Poland were influenced by trading contacts with the Hanseatic League. Swabian kings brought the Gothic tradition from Germany to Southern Italy, part of the Norman Kingdom of Sicily, while after the First Crusade the Lusignan kings introduced French Gothic architecture to Cyprus and the Kingdom of Jerusalem.

Throughout Europe at this time there was a rapid growth in trade and an associated growth in towns. Germany and the Lowlands had large flourishing towns that grew in comparative peace, in trade and competition with each other, or united for mutual weal, as in the Hanseatic League. Civic building was of great importance to these towns as a sign of wealth and pride. England and France remained largely feudal and produced grand domestic architecture for their kings, dukes and bishops, rather than grand town halls for their burghers.

== Religious ==
The Roman Catholic Church prevailed across Western Europe at this time, influencing not only faith but also wealth and power. Bishops were appointed by the feudal lords (kings, dukes and other landowners) and they often ruled as virtual princes over large estates. The early mediaeval periods had seen a rapid growth in monasticism, with several different orders being prevalent and spreading their influence widely. Foremost were the Benedictines whose great abbey churches vastly outnumbered any others in France, Normandy and England. A part of their influence was that towns developed around them and they became centres of culture, learning and commerce. They were the builders of the Abbey of Saint-Denis, and Abbey of Saint-Remi in France. Later Benedictine projects (constructions and renovations) include Rouen's Abbey of Saint-Ouen, the Abbey La Chaise-Dieu, and the choir of Mont Saint-Michel in France. English examples are Westminster Abbey, originally built as a Benedictine order monastic church; and the reconstruction of the Benedictine church at Canterbury.

The Cluniac and Cistercian Orders were prevalent in France, the great monastery at Cluny having established a formula for a well planned monastic site which was then to influence all subsequent monastic building for many centuries. The Cistercians spread the style as far east and south as Poland and Hungary. Smaller orders such as the Carthusians and Premonstratensians also built some 200 churches, usually near cities.

In the 13th century Francis of Assisi established the Franciscans, or so-called "Grey Friars", a mendicant order. Saint Dominic founded the mendicant Dominicans, in Toulouse and Bologna, were particularly influential in the building of Italy's Gothic churches.

The Teutonic Order, a military order, spread Gothic art into Pomerania, East Prussia, and the Baltic region.

Monastic churches

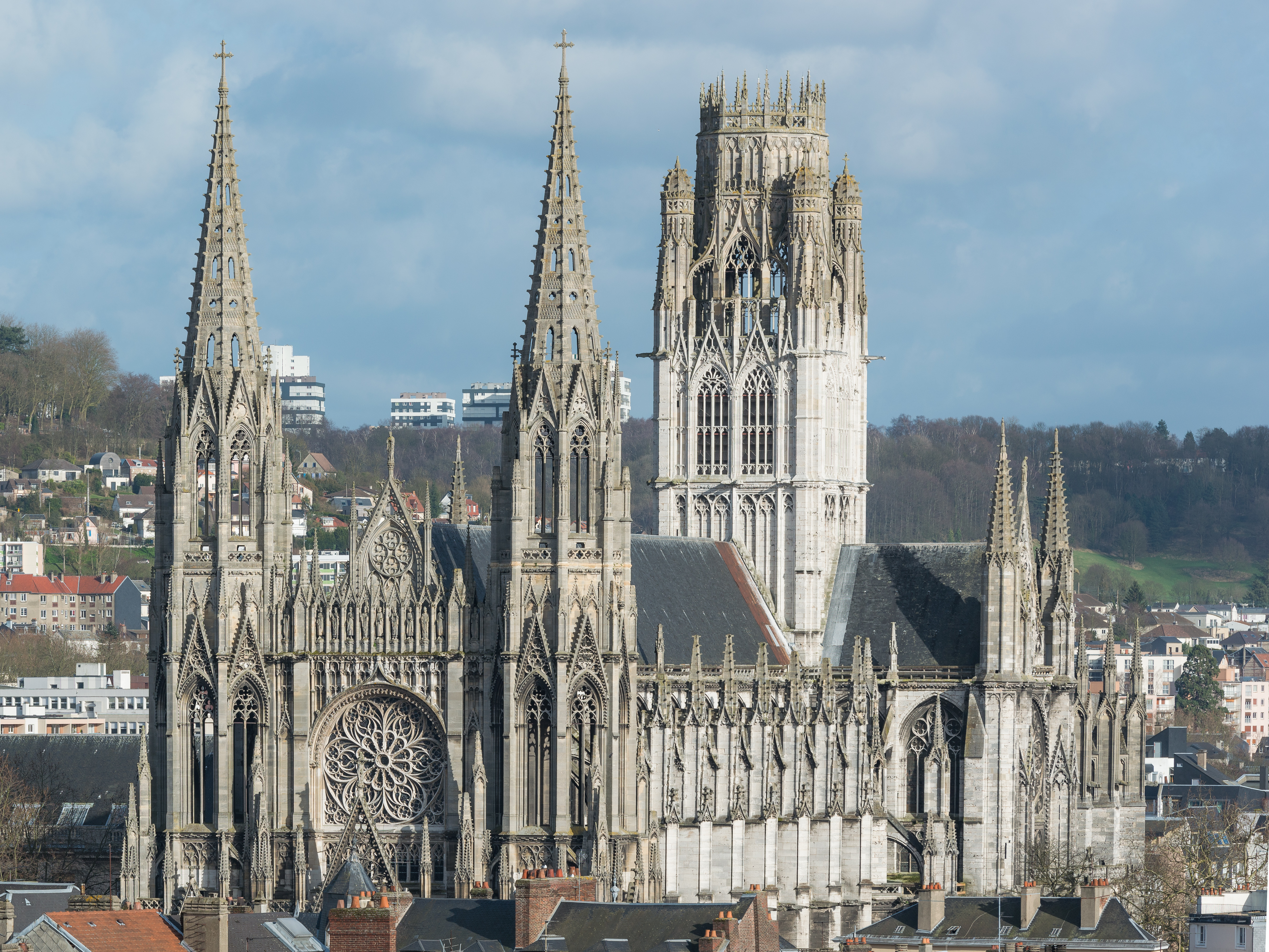
Abbey of Saint-Ouen, Rouen (1318–1537)

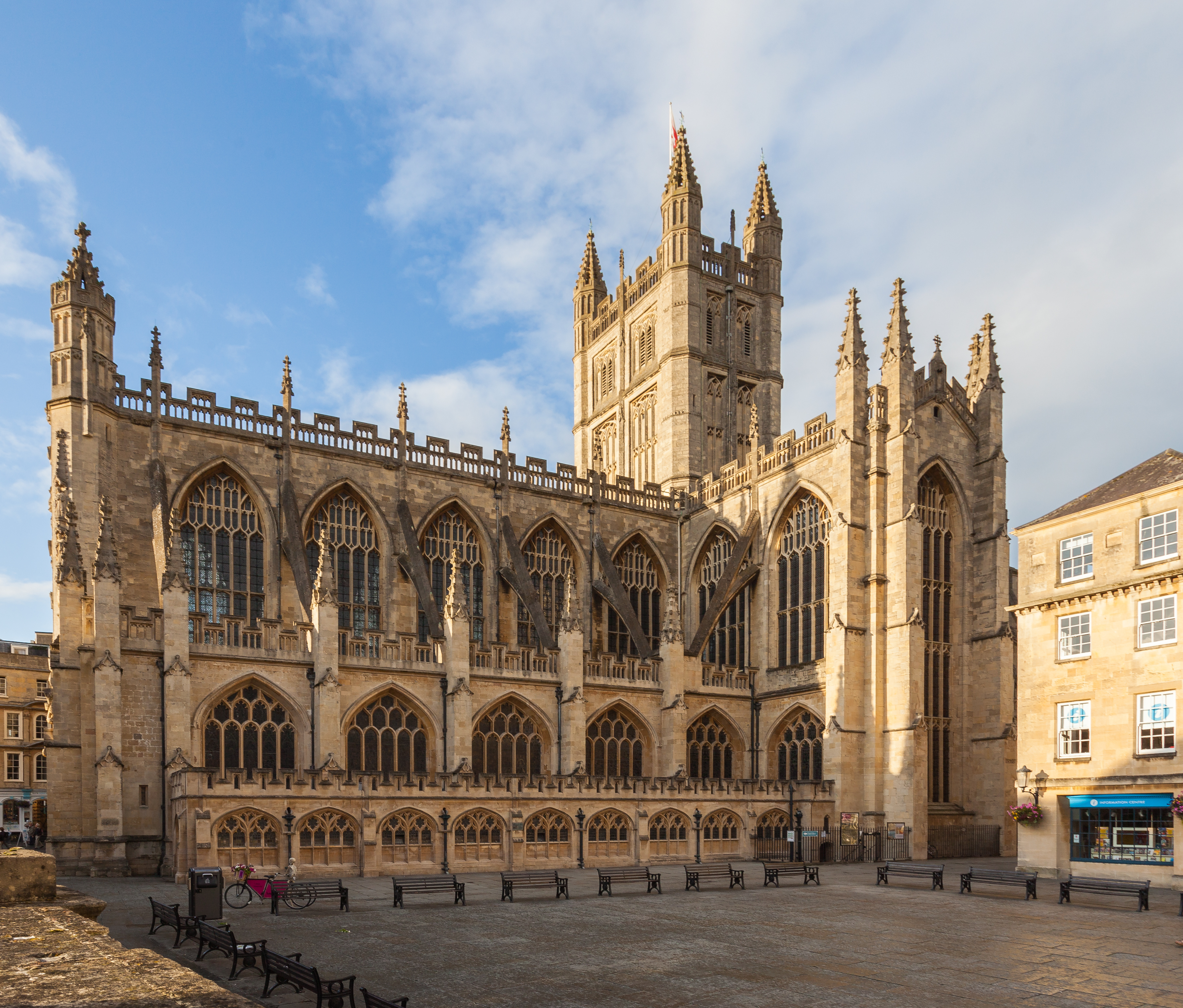
Bath Abbey, Bath, (present appearance 1501–)

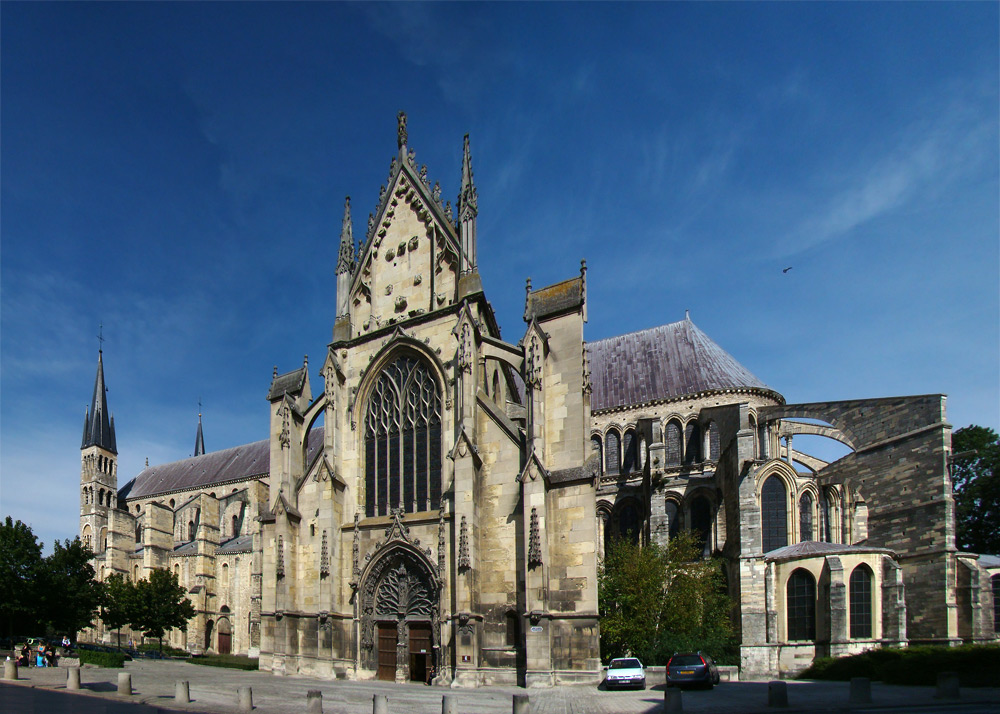
Abbey of Saint-Remi, Reims (1170–80)

Batalha Monastery, Portugal (1386–1517)

== Geographic ==
From the 10th to the 13th century, Romanesque architecture had become a pan-European style and manner of construction, affecting buildings in countries as far apart as Ireland, Croatia, Sweden and Sicily. The same wide geographic area was then affected by the development of Gothic architecture, but the acceptance of the Gothic style and methods of construction differed from place to place, as did the expressions of Gothic taste. The proximity of some regions meant that modern country borders do not define divisions of style. On the other hand, some regions such as England and Spain produced defining characteristics rarely seen elsewhere, except where they have been carried by itinerant craftsmen, or the transfer of bishops. Regional differences that are apparent in the churches of the Romanesque period often become even more apparent in the Gothic.

The local availability of materials affected both construction and style. In France, limestone was readily available in several grades, the very fine white limestone of Caen being favoured for sculptural decoration. England had coarse limestone and red sandstone as well as dark green Purbeck marble which was often used for architectural features.

In Northern Germany, Netherlands, northern Poland, Denmark, and the Baltic countries local building stone was unavailable but there was a strong tradition of building in brick. The resultant style, Brick Gothic, is called "Backsteingotik" in Germany and Scandinavia and is associated with the Hanseatic League. In Italy, stone was used for fortifications, but brick was preferred for other buildings. Because of the extensive and varied deposits of marble, many buildings were faced in marble, or were left with undecorated façade so that this might be achieved at a later date.

The availability of timber also influenced the style of architecture, with timber buildings prevailing in Scandinavia. Availability of timber affected methods of roof construction across Europe. It is thought that the magnificent hammer-beam roofs of England were devised as a direct response to the lack of long straight seasoned timber by the end of the mediaeval period, when forests had been decimated not only for the construction of vast roofs but also for ship building.

== Romanesque tradition ==
Gothic architecture grew out of the previous architectural genre, Romanesque. For the most part, there was not a clean break, as there was to be later in Renaissance Florence with the revival of the Classical style in the early 15th century.

By the 12th century, builders throughout Europe developed Romanesque architectural styles (termed Norman architecture in England because of its association with the Norman Conquest). Scholars have focused on categories of Romanesque/Norman building, including the cathedral church, the parish church, the abbey church, the monastery, the castle, the palace, the great hall, the gatehouse, the civic building, the warehouse, and others.

Many architectural features that are associated with Gothic architecture had been developed and used by the architects of Romanesque buildings, particularly in the building of cathedrals and abbey churches. These include ribbed vaults, buttresses, clustered columns, ambulatories, wheel windows, spires, stained glass windows, and richly carved door tympana. These were already features of ecclesiastical architecture before the development of the Gothic style, and all were to develop in increasingly elaborate ways.

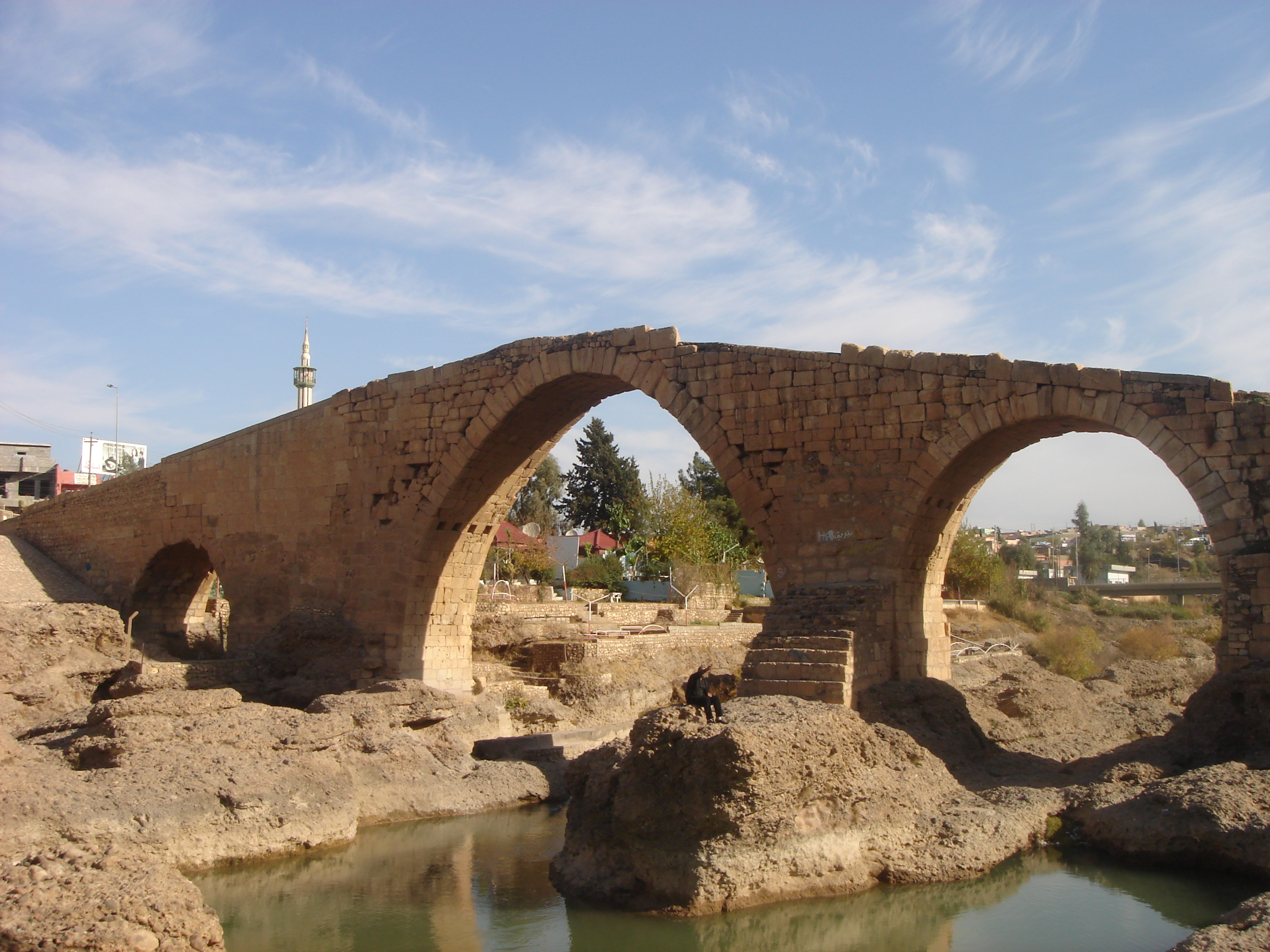
Delal Bridge, Iraq

It was principally the development of the pointed arch which brought about the change that separates Gothic from Romanesque. This technological change broke the tradition of massive masonry and solid walls penetrated by small openings, replacing it with a style where light appears to triumph over substance. With its use came the development of many other architectural devices, previously put to the test in scattered buildings and then called into service to meet the structural, aesthetic and ideological needs of the new style. These include the flying buttresses, pinnacles and traceried windows.

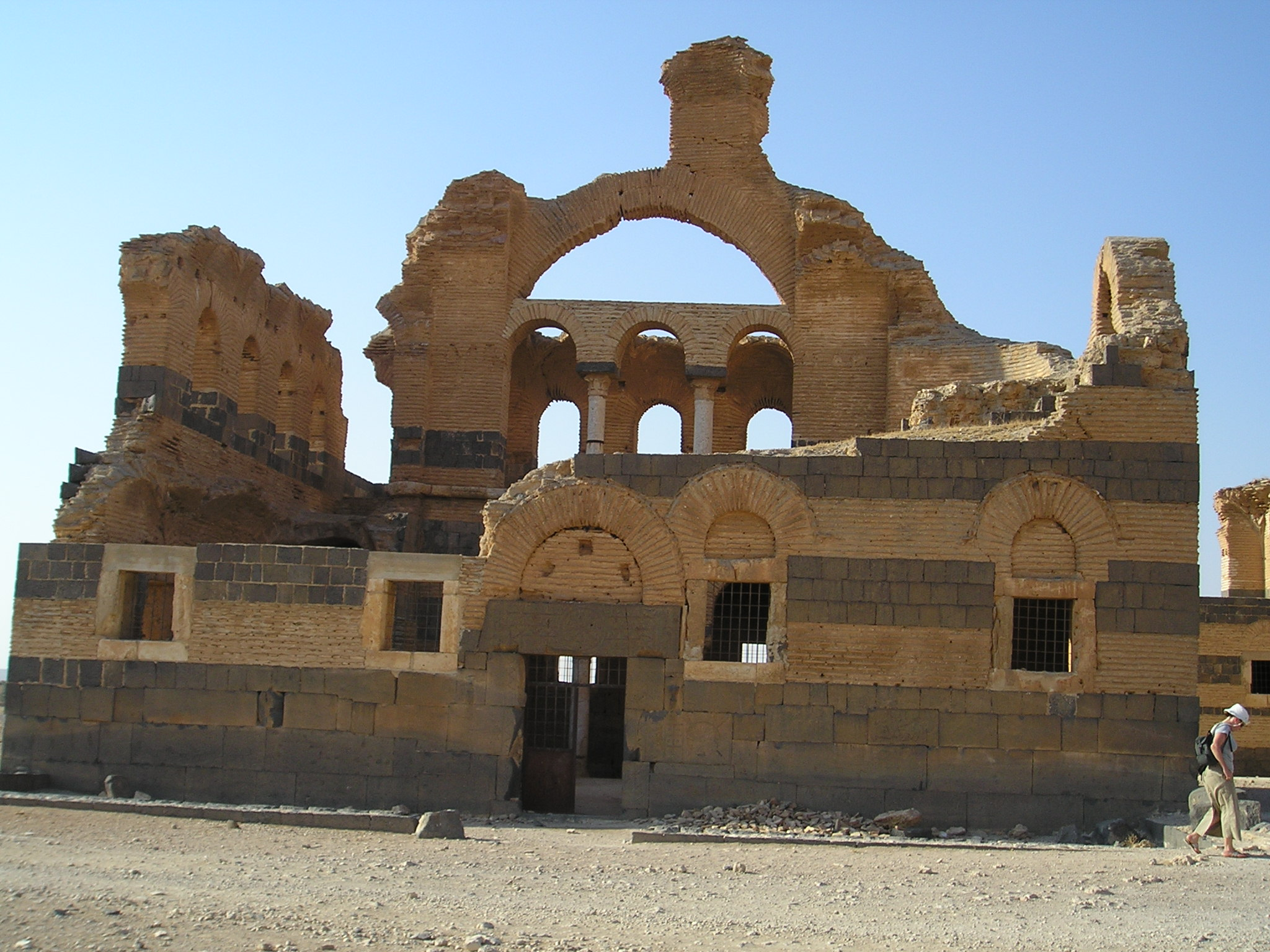
Church at Qasr ibn Wardan, Syria (564)

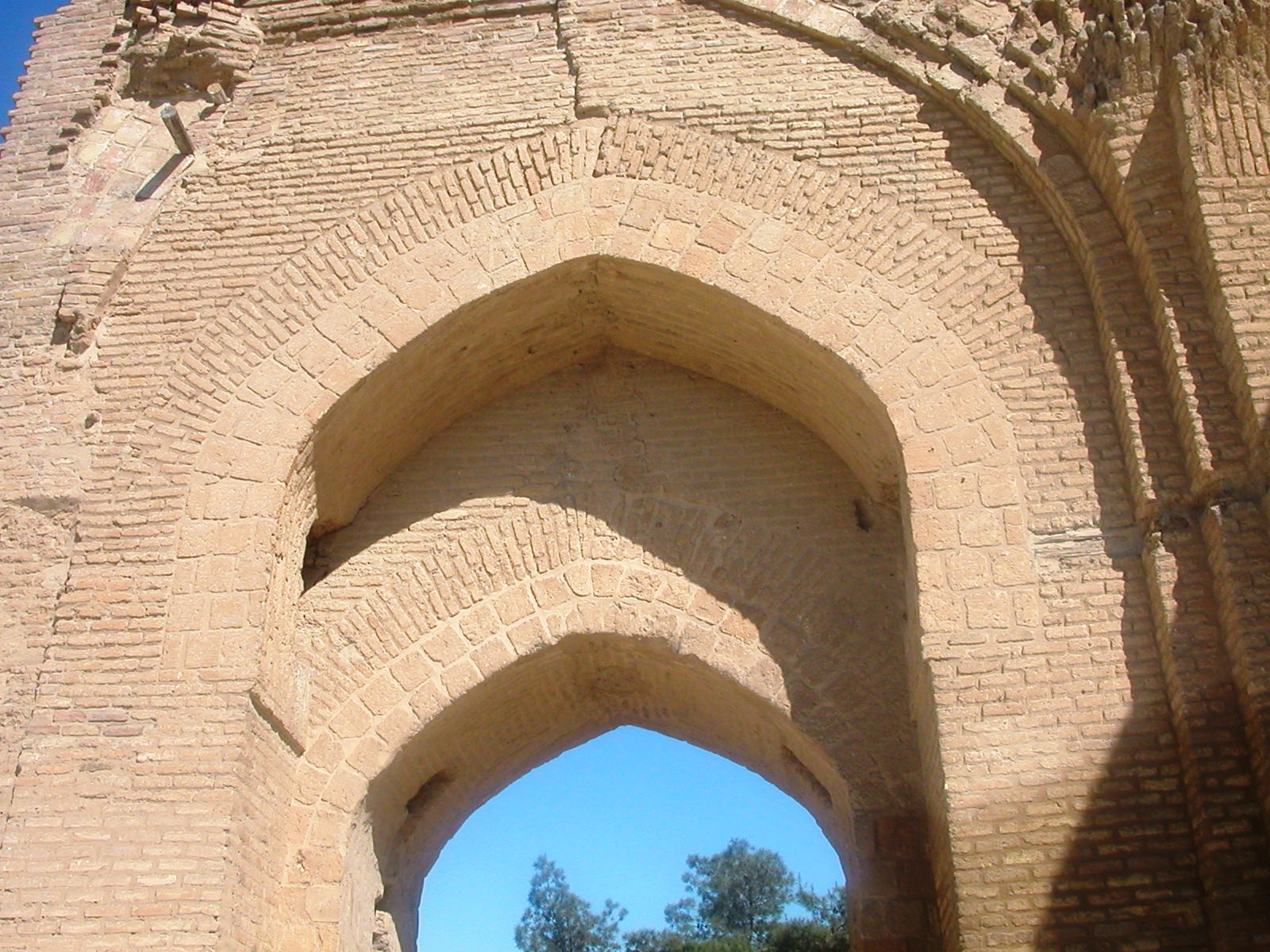
Arches at ar-Raqqa, Syria

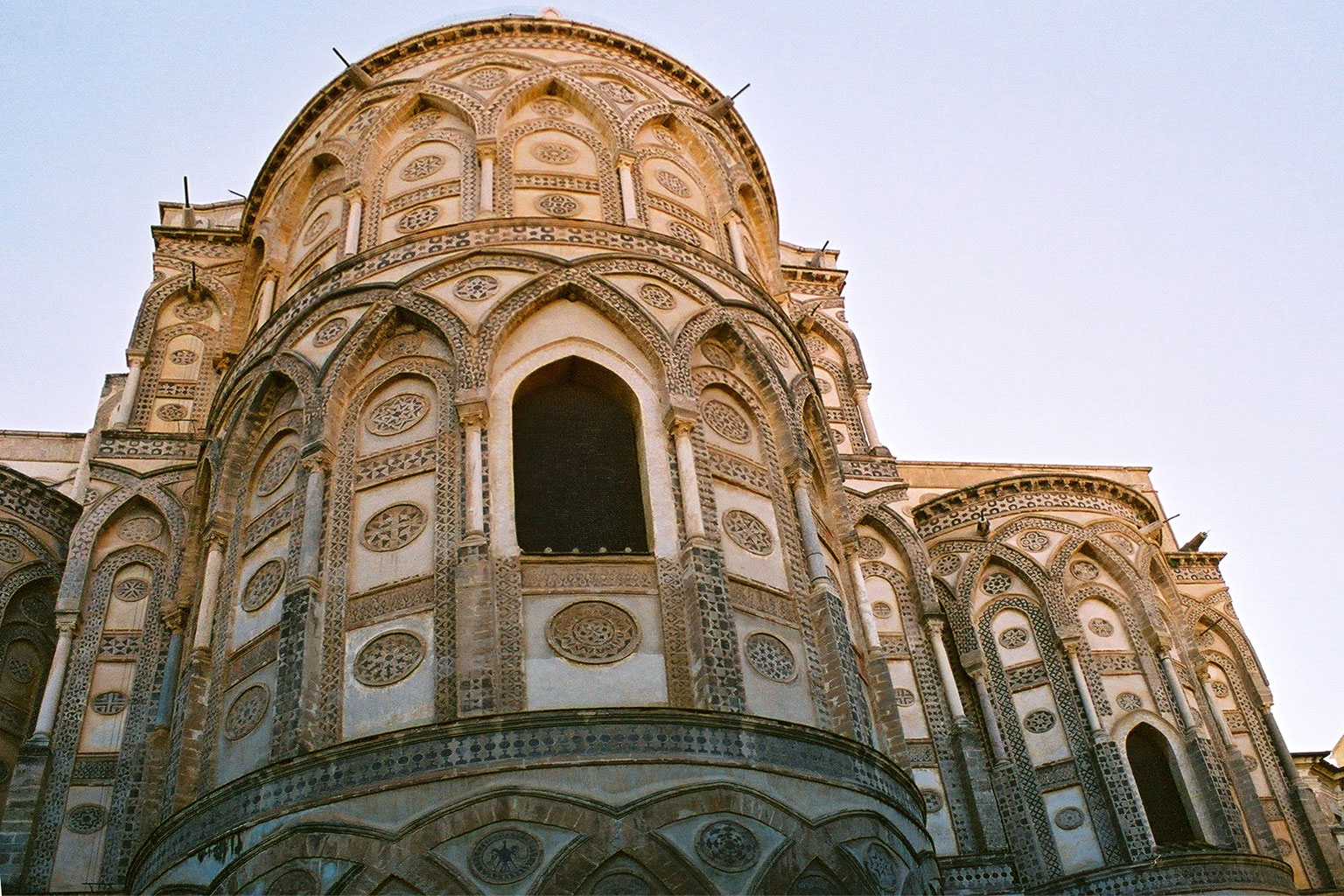
Monreale Cathedral, Sicily (1174)

== Eastern Christian, Sasanian, and Islamic Architecture ==
The pointed arch, one of the defining attributes of Gothic, appears in Late Roman Byzantine architecture and the Sasanian architecture of Iran during late antiquity, although the form had been used earlier, as in the possibly 1st century AD Temple of Bel, Dura Europos in Roman Mesopotamia. In the Roman context it occurred in church buildings in Syria and occasional secular structures, like the Karamagara Bridge in modern Turkey. In Sassanid architecture parabolic and pointed arches were employed in both palace and sacred construction. A very slightly pointed arch built in 549 exists in the apse of the Basilica of Sant'Apollinare in Classe in Ravenna, and slightly more pointed example from a church, built 564 at Qasr Ibn Wardan in Roman Syria. Pointed arches' development may have been influenced by the elliptical and parabolic arches frequently employed in Sasanian buildings using pitched brick vaulting, which obviated any need for wooden centring and which had for millennia been used in Mesopotamia and Syria. The oldest pointed arches in Islamic architecture are in the Dome of the Rock, completed in 691/2, while some others appear in the Great Mosque of Damascus, begun in 705. The Umayyads were responsible for the oldest significantly pointed arches in medieval western Europe, employing them alongside horseshoe arches in the Great Mosque of Cordoba, built from 785 and repeatedly extended. The Abbasid palace at al-Ukhaidir employed pointed arches in 778 as a dominant theme both structural and decorative throughout the façades and vaults of the complex, while the tomb of al-Muntasir, built 862, employed a dome with a pointed arch profile. Abbasid Samarra had many pointed arches, notably its surviving Bab al-ʿAmma (monumental triple gateway). By the 9th century the pointed arch was used in Egypt and North Africa: in the Nilometer at Fustat in 861, the 876 Mosque of Ibn Tulun in Cairo, and the 870s Great Mosque of Kairouan. Through the 8th and 9th centuries, the pointed arch was employed as standard in secular buildings in architecture throughout the Islamic world. The 10th century Aljafería at Zaragoza displays numerous forms of arch, including many pointed arches decorated and elaborated to a level of design sophistication not seen in Gothic architecture for a further two centuries.

Increasing military and cultural contacts with the Muslim world, including the Norman conquest of Islamic Sicily between 1060 and 1090, the Crusades, beginning 1096, and the Islamic presence in Spain, may have influenced medieval Europe's adoption of the pointed arch, although this hypothesis remains controversial. The structural advantages of pointed arches seems first to have been realised in a medieval Latin Christian context at the abbey church known as Cluny III at Cluny Abbey. Begun by abbot Hugh of Cluny in 1089, the great Romanesque church of Cluny III was the largest church in the west when completed in 1130. Kenneth John Conant, who excavated the site of the church's ruins, argued that the architectural innovations of Cluny III were inspired by the Islamic architecture of Sicily via Monte Cassino. The Abbey of Monte Cassino was the foundational community of the Benedictine Order and lay within the Norman Kingdom of Sicily, which at that time also had Arabic-speaking Muslim communities. The rib vault with pointed arches was used at Lessay Abbey in Normandy in 1098, Cefalù Cathedral in Sicily and at Durham Cathedral in England at about the same time. In those parts of the Western Mediterranean subject to Islamic control or influence, rich regional variants arose, fusing Romanesque, Byzantine and later Gothic traditions with Islamic decorative forms, as seen, for example, in Monreale and Cefalù Cathedrals, the Alcázar of Seville, and Teruel Cathedral.

=== Proposed Armenian influence ===
The Cathedral of Ani, completed in the early eleventh century, has frequently been compared with later Gothic architecture because of features including pointed arches and clustered piers. Several scholars have described these features as anticipating later Gothic forms.

Whether these similarities indicate an actual historical influence on Gothic architecture is disputed. Lucy Der Manuelian proposed that Armenians documented in medieval Western Europe could have transmitted architectural knowledge associated with Ani. By contrast, Sirarpie Der Nersessian rejected an Armenian derivation of Gothic architecture, noting in particular that Ani's pointed arches did not perform the same structural function as Gothic arches supporting ribbed vaults. The resemblance between Ani (and other Armenian churches with pointed arches, such as the Basilica of Tsitsernakevank) and later Gothic buildings therefore represents a proposed and contested connection rather than an established origin of Gothic architecture.

== Bibliography ==
- Bechmann, Roland (2017). Les Racines des Cathédrales (in French). Payot. ISBN 978-2-228-90651-7.
- Burton, Janet B.; Kerr, Julie (2011). The Cistercians in the Middle Ages. Monastic orders. Vol. 4 (Illustrated ed.). Boydell Press. ISBN 9781843836674.
- Bony, Jean (1983). French Gothic Architecture of the Twelfth and Thirteenth Centuries. University of California Press. ISBN 978-0-520-02831-9.
- Chastel, André (2000). L'Art Français Pré-Moyen Âge Moyen Âge (in French). Paris: Flammarion. ISBN 2-08-012298-3.
- Ching, Francis D.K. (2012). A Visual Dictionary of Architecture (2nd ed.). John Wiley & Sons, Inc. ISBN 978-0-470-64885-8.
- Clark, W. W.; King, R. (1983). Laon Cathedral, Architecture. Courtauld Institute Illustration Archives. 1. London: Harvey Miller Publishers. ISBN 9780905203553.
- Der Manuelian, Lucy (2001). "Ani: The Fabled Capital of Armenia". In Cowe, S. Peter (ed.). Ani: World Architectural Heritage of a Medieval Armenian Capital. Leuven Sterling. ISBN 978-90-429-1038-6.
- Draper, Peter (2005). "Islam and the West: The Early Use of the Pointed Arch Revisited". Architectural History. 5: 1–20. doi:10.1017/S0066622X00003701. ISSN 0066-622X. JSTOR 40033831. S2CID 194947480.
- Ducher, Robert (1988). Caractéristique des Styles (in French). Flammarion. ISBN 978-2-08-011539-3.
- Fiske, Kimball (1943). The Creation of the Rococo. Philadelphia Museum of Art.
- Fletcher, Banister (2001). A History of Architecture on the Comparative Method. Elsevier Science & Technology. ISBN 978-0-7506-2267-7.
- Garsoïan, Nina G. (2015). "Sirarpie Der Nersessian (1896–1989)". In Damico, Helen (ed.). Medieval Scholarship: Biographical Studies on the Formation of a Discipline: Religion and Art. Routledge. ISBN 978-1-317-77636-9.
- Giese, Francine; Pawlak, Anna; Thome, Markus (2018). Tomb – Memory – Space: Concepts of Representation in Premodern Christian and Islamic Art (in German). Walter de Gruyter GmbH & Co KG. ISBN 9783110517347.
- Grodecki, Louis (1977). Nervi, Luigi (ed.). Gothic Architecture. In collaboration with Anne Prache and Roland Recht, translated from French by I. Mark Paris. Abrams Books. ISBN 978-0-8109-1008-9.
- Harvey, John (1950). The Gothic World, 1100–1600. Batsford. ISBN 978-0-00-255228-8.
- Harvey, John (1974). Châteaux et Cathédrals-L'Art des Batisseurs, L'Encyclopedie de la Civilisation (in French). London: Thames and Hudson.
- Hughes, William; Punter, David; Smith, Andrew (2015). The Encyclopedia of the Gothic. John Wiley & Sons. ISBN 9781119210412.
- Jones, Colin (1999). The Cambridge Illustrated History of France. Cambridge University Press. ISBN 978-0-521-66992-4.
- Lang, David Marshall (1980). Armenia: Cradle of Civilization. Allen & Unwin.
- Martin, G. H.; Highfield, J. R. L. (1997). A history of Merton College, Oxford. Oxford: Oxford University Press. ISBN 0-19-920183-8.
- Martindale, Andrew (1993). Gothic Art. Thames and Hudson. ISBN 978-2-87811-058-6.
- McNamara, Denis (2017). Comprendre l'Art des Églises (in French). Larousse. ISBN 978-2-03-589952-1.
- Mignon, Olivier (2017). Architecture du Patrimoine Française - Abbayes, Églises, Cathédrales et Châteaux (in French). Éditions Ouest-France. ISBN 978-27373-7611-5.
- Mignon, Olivier (2015). Architecture des Cathédrales Gothiques (in French). Éditions Ouest-France. ISBN 978-2-7373-6535-5.
- Mitchell, Ann (1968). Cathedrals of Europe. Great Buildings of the World. Hamlyn. ASIN B0006C19ES.
- Moffat, Fazio & Wodehouse (2003). A World History of Architecture. Laurence King Publishing. ISBN 1-85669-353-8.
- Montagnon, Pierre (2016). La France des Clochers (in French). Editions Telemaque. ISBN 978-2-7533-0307-2.
- Oggins, R.O. (2000). Cathedrals. Friedman/Fairfax Publishers. ISBN 9781567993462.
- Pevsner, Nikolaus (1964). An Outline of European Architecture. Pelican Books. ISBN 978-0-14-061613-2.
- Poisson, Georges; Poisson, Olivier (2014). Eugène Viollet-le-Duc (in French). Paris: Picard. ISBN 978-2-7084-0952-1.
- Raeburn, Michael (1980). "The Middle Ages". In Coldstream, Nicola (ed.). Architecture of the Western World. With a foreword by Sir Hugh Casson. Rizzoli International. ISBN 978-0-8478-0349-1.
- Renault, Christophe; Lazé, Christophe (2006). Les Styles de l'architecture et du mobilier (in French). Gisserot. ISBN 978-2-87747-465-8.
- Scott, Robert A. (2003). The Gothic enterprise: a guide to understanding the Medieval cathedral. University of California Press. ISBN 978-0-520-23177-1.
- Stewart, Cecil (1959). History of Architectural Development: Early Christian, Byzantine and Romanesque Architecture. Longman.
- Swaan, Wim (1988). The Gothic Cathedral. Omega Books. ISBN 978-0-907853-48-0.
- Rice, David Talbot (1972). The Appreciation of Byzantine Art. Oxford University Press.
- Texier, Simon (2012). Paris Panorama de l'architecture de l'Antiquité à nos jours (in French). Parigramme. ISBN 978-2-84096-667-8.
- Toman, Rolf (2007). Néoclassicisme et Romantisme. Ulmann. ISBN 978-3-8331-3557-6.
- Vasari, Giorgio (1907). Brown, Gerald Baldwin; Maclehose, Louisa (eds.). Vasari on Technique: Being the Introduction to the Three Arts of Design, Architecture, Sculpture and Painting, Prefixed to the Lives of the Most Excellent Painters, Sculptors and Architects. J. M. Dent & Co.
- Vasari, Giorgio (1991). The Lives of the Artists. Translated with an introduction and notes by J.C. and P. Bondanella. Oxford University Press. ISBN 978-0-19-953719-8.
- Viollet-le-Duc, Eugène (1868). Dictionnaire raisonné de l'architecture française du XIe au XVIe siècle. Édition BANCE.
- Watkin, David (1986). A History of Western Architecture. Barrie and Jenkins. ISBN 0-7126-1279-3.
- Wenzler, Claude (2018). Les cathédrales gothiques: Un défi médiéval (in French). Éditions Ouest-France. ISBN 978-2-7373-7712-9.
- "Chartres Cathedral Royal Portal Sculpture". Chartres Cathedral. 2020.
