= Maan massacre =

Reported massacre of Alawites in the village of Ma'an, Syria

- Part of the Syrian Civil War
- Location: Ma'an, Hama Governorate, Syria
- Date: 9 February 2014
- Target: Alawite civilian population and pro-government NDF soldiers
- Attack type: Massacre
- Deaths: 24–60+
- Perpetrators: Jund al-Aqsa; Ahrar ash-Sham; Al-Nusra Front (Per Ba'athist Syria, denied by Ahrar al-Sham)

The Maan massacre (Arabic: مجزرة معان) was a massacre of Alawite civilians and in the village of Ma'an, Syria that occurred on 9 February 2014 committed by Islamist rebel groups Ahrar al-Sham and Jund al-Aqsa.

== Events ==
On 9 February 2014, rebels of the Jund al-Aqsa group attacked and captured the Alawite village of Maan, in Hama province, killing 21 civilians as well as 20 pro-government militiamen according to the pro-opposition war monitor Syrian Observatory for Human Rights (SOHR). The SOHR later updated the civilian death toll to "at least 24 civilians", with 14 of the victims being women.

The Syrian government gave a higher death toll, initially claiming 42 civilians were killed and later 60, most of them women, children and the elderly.

The government blamed Nusra Front. This claim however, was denied by the rebel group Ahrar al-Sham, which said that its fighters collaborated with another group to kill around 50 pro-government fighters in the village and denied that the Nusra Front was involved. The SOHR claims that Ahrar al-Sham collaborated with the Islamist group Jund al-Aqsa (another Al-Qaeda affiliate closely linked to Al-Nusra Front at the time) in committing the massacre. Both were members of the Army of Conquest, an alliance of various Islamist rebel brigades operating in the Hama countryside, Aleppo and Idlib, which included Al-Nusra Front.

== Aftermath ==
United Nations Secretary-General Ban Ki-moon later expressed great shock at the "dozens" reported dead and demanded that "perpetrators of this massacre" be brought to justice.

The massacre caused demonstrations against Al Qaeda, Al Nusra Front, and the ruling Justice and Development Party by the Alawite community in Hatay, Mersin, Istanbul and other Turkish cities.

On 17 February 2014, the Syrian Army recaptured Maan "after shelling and fighting."

== See also ==
- 2025 massacres of Syrian Alawites
- List of massacres during the Syrian Civil War
