= Al-Hamraa =

Al-Hamraa الحمراء Al-Hamra
- Village
- Location in Syria
- Coordinates: 35°18′56″N 37°5′14″E
- Country: Syria
- Governorate: Hama
- District: Hama
- Subdistrict: al-Hamraa

Population (2004)
  - Total: 1,783
- Time zone: UTC+3 (AST)

Al-Hamraa (Arabic: الحمراء, also spelled al-Hamra) is a village in northwestern Syria, administratively part of the Hama Governorate, located northeast of Hama. Nearby localities include Jubb al-Othman to the northeast, Abu al-Thuhur to the north, Fan al-Shamali to the west, Maar Shahhur to the southwest, Salamiyah to the south and Sabburah to the southeast. According to the Syria Central Bureau of Statistics (CBS), al-Hamraa had a population of 1,783 in the 2004 census. It is the administrative centre and second-largest locality of the al-Hamraa nahiyah ("subdistrict"), which consisted of 44 localities with a collective population of 32,604 in 2004.

In 1838 al-Hamraa was classified as a khirba ("temporal village") in the District of Salamiyah. It is situated near the Qasr ibn Wardan palace.

== Bibliography ==
- Robinson, E.; Smith, E. (1841). Biblical Researches in Palestine, Mount Sinai and Arabia Petraea: A Journal of Travels in the year 1838. Vol. 3. Boston: Crocker & Brewster.
