= Duma, Hama =

Duma دوما
- Village
- Location in Syria
- Coordinates: 35°20′25″N 37°0′10″E
- Country: Syria
- Governorate: Hama
- District: Hama District
- Subdistrict: Al-Hamraa Nahiyah

Population (2004)
  - Total: 499
- Time zone: UTC+3 (AST)
- City Qrya Pcode: C3076

Duma (Arabic: دوما) is a Syrian village located in Al-Hamraa Nahiyah in Hama District, Hama. According to the Syria Central Bureau of Statistics (CBS), Duma had a population of 499 in the 2004 census.
