= Arfa =

Arfa عرفه
- Village
- Location in Syria
- Coordinates: 35°22′23″N 37°1′56″E
- Country: Syria
- Governorate: Hama
- District: Hama
- Subdistrict: Hamraa

Population (2004)
  - Total: 590
- Time zone: UTC+3 (AST)
- City Qrya Pcode: C3091

Arfa (Arabic: عرفه) is a Syrian village located in Al-Hamraa Nahiyah in Hama District, Hama. According to the Syria Central Bureau of Statistics (CBS), Arfa had a population of 590 in the 2004 census.

As of 14 February 2025, the village was uninhabited, its residents having been displaced during the Syrian Civil War.
