= Al-Hazim =

Al-Hazim الحزم
- Village
- Location in Syria
- Coordinates: 35°22′15″N 37°1′31″E
- Country: Syria
- Governorate: Hama
- District: Hama District
- Subdistrict: Al-Hamraa Nahiyah

Population (2004)
  - Total: 1,557
- Time zone: UTC+3 (AST)
- City Qrya Pcode: C3101

Al-Hazim (Arabic: الحزم) is a Syrian village located in Al-Hamraa Nahiyah, in the Hama District, Hama. According to the Syria Central Bureau of Statistics (CBS), al-Hazim had a population of 1,557 at the time of the 2004 Census. By 18 February 2025, the village had a resident population of 1,513 people.
