= Tell Khaznah =

Tal Khazneh تل خزنة
- Village
- Location in Syria
- Coordinates: 34°52′56″N 37°0′5″E
- Country: Syria
- Governorate: Hama
- District: Salamiyah District
- Subdistrict: Salamiyah Subdistrict

Population (2004)
  - Total: 1,252
- Time zone: UTC+3 (AST)
- City Qrya Pcode: C3239

Tal Khazneh (Arabic: تل خزنة) is a Syrian village located in Salamiyah Subdistrict in Salamiyah District, Hama. According to the Syria Central Bureau of Statistics (CBS), Tal Khazneh had a population of 1,252 in the 2004 census. Its residents are predominantly Sunnis from the al-Naim clan, in additional to a small number of Shiite families (presumably Ismailis).
