= Fan Qibli =

Fan Qibli فان قبلي
- Village
- Location in Syria
- Coordinates: 35°16′42″N 36°54′31″E
- Country: Syria
- Governorate: Hama
- District: Salamiyah
- Subdistrict: Salamiyah

Population (2004)
  - Total: 974
- Time zone: UTC+3 (AST)
- City Qrya Pcode: C3253

Fan Qibli (Arabic: فان قبلي) is a Syrian village located in the Salamiyah Subdistrict of the Salamiyah District in Hama Governorate. According to the Syria Central Bureau of Statistics (CBS), Fan Qibli had a population of 974 in the 2004 census. Its inhabitants are predominantly Alawites.
