= Zighrin =

Zighrin زغرين
- Village
- Location in Syria
- Coordinates: 35°5′41″N 37°0′45″E
- Country: Syria
- Governorate: Hama
- District: Salamiyah
- Subdistrict: Salamiyah

Population (2004)
  - Total: 2,327
- Time zone: UTC+3 (AST)
- City Qrya Pcode: C3211

Zighrin (Arabic: زغرين) is a Syrian village located in the Salamiyah Subdistrict of the Salamiyah District in Hama Governorate. According to the Syria Central Bureau of Statistics (CBS), Zighrin had a population of 2,327 in the 2004 census. Its inhabitants are predominantly Alawites.
