= Aziziyah =

Aziziyah Little Pakistan
- Neighborhood
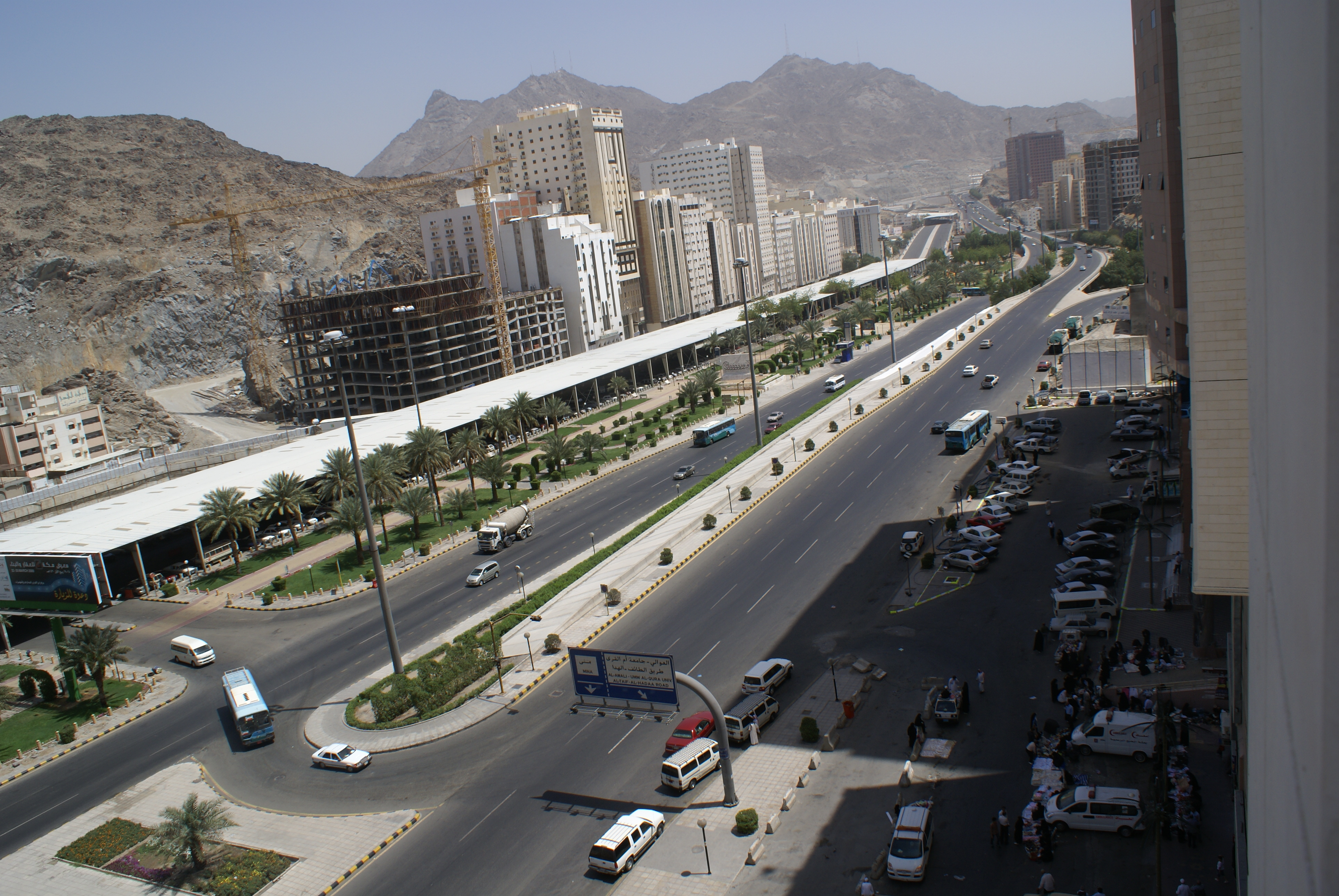
- Country: Saudi Arabia
- Province: Makkah Province
- City: Mecca
- Time zone: UTC+3 (EAT)
  - Summer (DST): UTC+3 (EAT)

Aziziyah is a neighborhood of Mecca in Makkah Province, in western Saudi Arabia.

There are also neighborhoods in the cities of Jeddah and Riyadh, Saudi Arabia by that name. Its nickname is "Mini Pakistan" as there are many Pakistani there having migrated from Pakistan in early 1980s.
