= Arfa (name) =

Name list

Arfa may refer to the following people:

== Given name ==
- Arfa Sayeda Zehra (1937–2025), Pakistani educationist and human rights activist
- Arfa Siddiq (born 1987), Pakistani politician and leader of the Pashtun Tahafuz Movement
- Arfa Karim (1995–2012), Pakistani computer programmer
  - Arfa Software Technology Park, named after Arfa Karim

== Surname ==
- Fares Arfa (born 1994), Canadian fencer
- Hasan Arfa (1895–1984), Iranian general and ambassador
- Hatem Ben Arfa (born 1987), French football player
- Abu'l Hasan ibn Arfa Ra'a (died 1197), Muslim chemist
