= Atshan =

Atshan عطشان
- Village
- Location in Syria
- Coordinates: 35°24′21″N 36°49′24″E
- Country: Syria
- Governorate: Hama
- District: Hama
- Subdistrict: Suran

Population (2004)
  - Total: 1,809
- Time zone: UTC+2 (EET)
  - Summer (DST): UTC+3 (EEST)
- City Qrya Pcode: C3021

Atshan (Arabic: عطشان) is a village in central Syria, administratively part of the Suran Subdistrict of the Hama District, located northeast of Hama city. According to the Syria Central Bureau of Statistics (CBS), Atshan had a population of 1,809 in the 2004 census. Its inhabitants are Sunni Muslims.

== History ==
Atshan was sold by the prominent landowning Barazi family of Hama to a merchant from Hama, Muhammad Katkaz, in 1929. Its inhabitants were Sunni Muslim Arabs of Bedouin origin.

On 10 October 2015, the town was seized by the Syrian government from opposition fighters.

Since the end of the Syrian Civil War, at least 357 IDPs have returned to Atshan, most of whom had been living in the Atmeh Camp, located in Atmeh, Idlib.

== Bibliography ==
- Comité de l'Asie française (April 1933). "Notes sur la propriété foncière dans le Syrie centrale (Notes on Landownership in Central Syria)". Bulletin du Comité de l'Asie française (in French). 33 (309). Comité de l'Asie française: 130–136.
