= Hirbnafsah Subdistrict =

Hirbnafsah Subdistrict ناحية حربنفسه
- Subdistrict (nahiyah)
- Location in Hama Governorate

- Location in Syria
- Country: Syria
- Governorate: Hama
- District: Hama District
- Capital: Hirbnafsah

Population (2004)
  - Total: 54,592
- Time zone: UTC+2 (EET)
  - Summer (DST): UTC+3 (EEST)
- Nahya pcod: SY050102

Hirbnafsah Subdistrict (Arabic: ناحية حربنفسه) is a Syrian nahiyah (subdistrict) located in Hama District in Hama. According to the Syria Central Bureau of Statistics (CBS), Hirbnafsah Subdistrict had a population of 54,592 in the 2004 census.
