= Hama Subdistrict =

Hama Subdistrict ناحية مركز حماة
- Subdistrict (nahiyah)
- Location in Hama Governorate

- Location in Syria
- Country: Syria
- Governorate: Hama
- District: Hama District
- Controlled: Syrian transitional government
- Capital: Hama

Population (2023)
  - Total: 750,640
- Time zone: UTC+2 (EET)
  - Summer (DST): UTC+3 (EEST)
- Nahya pcod: SY050100

Hama Subdistrict (Arabic: ناحية مركز حماة) is a Syrian nahiyah (subdistrict) located in Hama District in Hama. As of July 2023, the sub-district had a population of 750,640, of whom 162,258 (21.62%) were IDPs. Following Fall of the Assad regime the Subdistrict is now controlled by the Syrian transitional government.
