= Al-Hamraa Subdistrict =

Al-Hamraa Subdistrict ناحية الحمراء
- Subdistrict (nahiyah)
- Location in Hama Governorate

- Location in Syria
- Coordinates: 35.4167°N 37.2489°E
- Country: Syria
- Governorate: Hama
- District: Hama District
- Capital: Al-Hamraa

Population (2004)
  - Total: 32,604
- Time zone: UTC+2 (EET)
  - Summer (DST): UTC+3 (EEST)
- Nahya pcod: SY050103

Al-Hamraa Subdistrict (Arabic: ناحية الحمراء) is a Syrian nahiyah (subdistrict) located in Hama District in Hama. According to the Syria Central Bureau of Statistics (CBS), Al-Hamraa Subdistrict had a population of 32,604 in the 2004 census.
