= Hama District =

District of Hama, Syria

- District
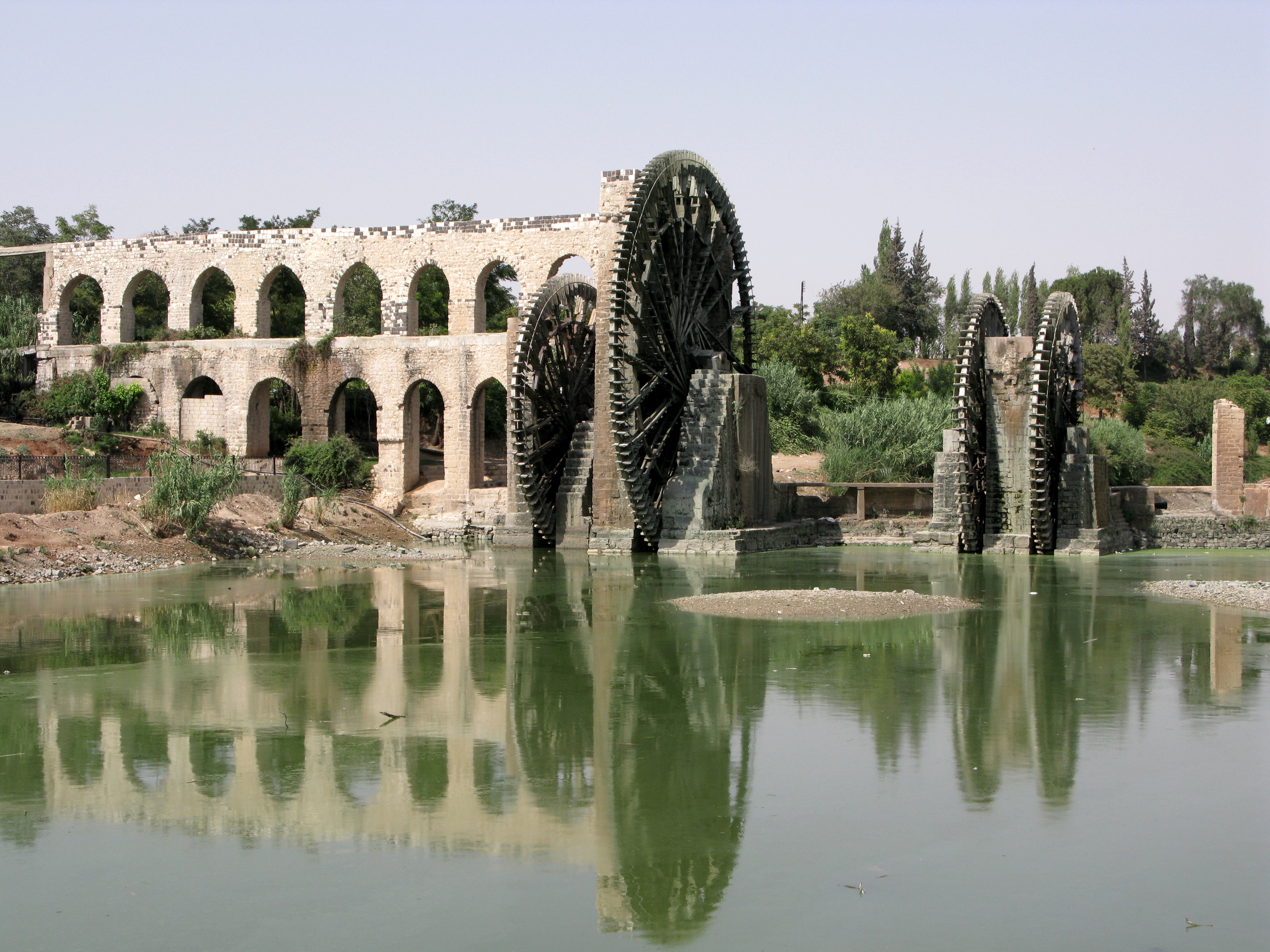
- Norias of Hama

- Map of Hama District within Hama Governorate
- Coordinates (Hama): 35.133333°N 36.75°E
- Country: Syria
- Governorate: Hama
- Seat: Hama
- Subdistricts: 4 nawāḥī

Population (2004)
  - Total: 645,104

Hama District (Arabic: منطقة حماة Ḥamā) is a district (mantiqah) in Hama Governorate, Syria. According to the 2004 census, it was the most populated district in the governorate with a population of 645,104. The district is divided into four sub-districts (nawāḥī).

== History ==
Hama is one of the oldest continuously inhabited settlements in Syria. Archaeological excavations conducted by the Danish in the 1930s has revealed evidence of settlement from the Stone Age (c. 6000 BCE). Later, it became the capital of the Neo-Hittite kingdom of Hamath. Hama is known for its norias, which are traditional wooden waterwheels, constructed along the Orontes River. While it is not known when the first waterwheels were constructed, a Byzantine era mosaic dated to fifth century CE depicts one such noria. The largest surviving waterwheel, Na'ura al-Muhammadiya, measures 20 m (66 ft) in diameter, and was constructed in 1361.

In February 1982, Hama was the site of a military attack by the Syrian government led by Hafez al-Assad against the Muslim Brotherhood of Syria in what became termed as Hama massacre. The government forces besieged the city for three weeks, resulting in severe destruction and deaths of thousands of civilians. During the 2011 Syrian revolution, Hama was involved in anti-government protests. On 22 April, government forces opened fire on demonstrators killing several people. It remained under government control during much of the war, before opposition forces led by Hay'at Tahrir al-Sham captured the Hama city in December 2024.

== Geography ==
Hama District is one of the six administrative districts (manṭiqat) of Hama Governorate, Syria. (Note: Sources state the five districts of Hama Governorate as Al-Suqaylabiyah, Masyaf, Hama, Maharda, and Salamiyah. Salhab District was established by a presidential decree in 2024.) The city of Hama lies along the Orontes River. The district is divided into four sub-districts (nawāḥī)–Hama (حماة), Suran (صوران), Hirbnafsah (حربنفسه), and Al-Hamraa (الحمراء).

== Demographics ==
According to the 2004 census, the district had a population of 645,104, comprising 334,014 males and 311,090 females. The census recorded 103,825 households, with an average household size of 6.2 people. The illiteracy rate was 8.03% among males and 19.30% among females. About 57.53% of the population were recorded as engaged in paid work, 22.46% were self-employed and 10.76% worked without pay. The unemployment rate among males was 6.62%. Approximately 86.76% of the households were own houses.

According to the 2004 census, 49,686 inhabitants were recorded in Al-Suqaylabiyah sub-district, 38,783 in Tell Salhab, 38,872 in Al-Ziyarah, 25,273 in Shathah and 85,597 in Qalaat al-Madiq. The United Nations Office for the Coordination of Humanitarian Affairs (OCHA) estimated the population in 2021 as 754,688 in Hama sub-district, 10,870 in Al-Hamraa, 50,040 in Harbanifsah and 28,805 in Suran. According to OCHA's 2024 report, the district had an estimated population of 849,036 of which 750,640 was in the Hama sub-district including 162,258 internally displaced people (IDP). Al-Hamraa, Harbanifsah, and Suran had an estimated population of 11,525, 51,184, and 35,687 inhabitants respectively. The combined estimated population of the four sub-districts was 849,036.
