= Izz al-Din, Syria =

Izz al-Din عز الدين 'Az ed-Din
- Village
- Location in Syria
- Coordinates: 34°56′52″N 36°54′59″E
- Country: Syria
- Governorate: Homs
- District: Al-Rastan
- Subdistrict: Al-Rastan

Population (2004)
  - Total: 2,162
- Time zone: UTC+3 (EET)
  - Summer (DST): UTC+2 (EEST)

Izz al-Din (Arabic: عز الدين, also spelled 'Az ed-Din) is a village in northern Syria, administratively part of the Homs Governorate, located northeast of Homs. Nearby localities include Ghor al-Assi, Murayj al-Durr and al-Rastan to the west, Deir Ful and al-Zaafaraniyah to the southwest, al-Mishirfeh and Ayn al-Niser to the south, Dunaybah to the southeast, Khunayfis to the east, Salamiyah to the northeast and Taldara to the north.

According to the Syria Central Bureau of Statistics (CBS), Izz al-Din had a population of 2,620 in the 2004 census, making it the fifth-largest locality in the al-Rastan nahiyah ("subdistrict"). Its inhabitants are predominantly Sunni Muslims from Bedouin tribes, such as the Nu'aym (Na'im). It is popularly believed that Izz al-Din was named after a patriarch of the Nu'aym who was buried in the village and whose maqam (mausoleum) there was a site of visitation.

== History ==
In 1838 Izz al-Din was classified as a khirba (ruined or deserted village') by English scholar Eli Smith. However, by December of that year Izz al-Din was one of roughly 20 ruined villages to be repopulated during the rule of Muhammad Ali's Egypt. The village was founded largely as a result of the Egyptian administration's major initiative to expand agricultural production. Izz al-Din was settled by the Bedouin tribes of the Mawali, Nu'aym and Uqaydat. Although by the 1840s, when the Egyptians withdrew from the Levant, most of the newly founded villages were abandoned, Izz al-Din remained inhabited. Other remaining villages included Salamiyah, Taldara and Taqsis.

== Bibliography ==
- Douwes, Dick (2000). The Ottomans in Syria: a history of justice and oppression. I.B. Tauris. ISBN 1860640311.
- Robinson, Edward; Smith, Eli (1841). Biblical Researches in Palestine, Mount Sinai and Arabia Petraea: A Journal of Travels in the Year 1838. Vol. 3. Crocker and Brewster.
