= Deir Ful =

Deir Ful دير فول Derful Dayr Foul
- Village
- Location in Syria
- Coordinates: 34°55′27″N 36°50′32″E
- Country: Syria
- Governorate: Homs
- District: Al-Rastan
- Subdistrict: Talbiseh

Population (2004)
  - Total: 1,614
- Time zone: UTC+3 (EET)
  - Summer (DST): UTC+2 (EEST)

Deir Ful (Arabic: دير فول, also spelled Derful or Deir Foul) is a village in northern Syria, administratively part of the Homs Governorate, located northeast of Homs. Nearby localities include al-Rastan to the west, al-Zaafaraniyah to the southwest, al-Mishirfeh and Ayn al-Niser to the south, Danibah and Khunayfis to the east, Izz al-Din to the northeast and Ghor al-Assi to the northwest. According to the Syria Central Bureau of Statistics (CBS), Deir Ful had a population of 1,614 in the 2004 census.

== History ==
The village was established in 1878–1880 by Kumyk emigrants (muhajirs) from the Northern Caucasian Dagestan, settlements of Utamish, Bashlykent and Karabudaghkent, later joined by Kumyks from the Kumyk possession of the Russian Empire and many other Dagestan people. The population consisted of 383 people by 1882 and had grown to 120 families by 1906 (meaning likely 600-800 people). The town had been taken over by the Islamic State by 2014. Russia began launching airstrikes against Islamic State targets in the area on 30 September 2015.

== Additional Resources ==
- https://tarikhi.org/interview/mohamad-malek-daghstani/
- https://www.facebook.com/mod.mil.rus/posts/i-the-return-of-refugees-from-abroadover-the-past-24-hours-refugees-have-not-ret/2143399872569424/
