= Jarjisa =

Jarjisa جرجيسا
- Village
- Location in Syria
- Coordinates: 34°56′37″N 36°41′36″E
- Country: Syria
- Governorate: Hama
- District: Hama
- Subdistrict: Hirbnafsah

Population (2004)
  - Total: 4,352
- Time zone: UTC+3 (AST)

Jarjisa (Arabic: جرجيسا, romanized: Jarjeesa) is a village in northwestern Syria, administratively part of the Hama Governorate, southwest of Hama. It is situated on the eastern banks of the Orontes River, the border between the governorates of Hama and Homs. Nearby localities include Tumin to the east, al-Rastan to the southeast, Kafr Nan to the southwest, Hirbnafsah to the west, Deir al-Fardis to the northwest and al-Biyah to the north.

== Demographics ==
According to the Central Bureau of Statistics, Jarjisa had a population of 4,352 in the 2004 census. Its inhabitants are predominantly Turkmen Sunni Muslims and were recorded as Muslims in 1838.

== Syrian Civil War ==
In 2012, at least 13 civilians were killed when the village was shelled by the Syrian Army.

== Bibliography ==
- Douwes, Dick (2000). The Ottomans in Syria: a history of justice and oppression. I.B. Tauris. ISBN 1860640311.
- Robinson, E.; Smith, E. (1841). Biblical Researches in Palestine, Mount Sinai and Arabia Petraea: A Journal of Travels in the year 1838. Vol. 3. Boston: Crocker & Brewster.
