= Assi =

Assi may refer to:

== People with the forename ==
- Rav Assi (Assi I; fl. 3rd century), Jewish Talmudist
- Rabbi Assi (Assi II; fl. 4th century), Jewish Talmudist
- Assi al-Qawali, Iraqi Kurdish insurgent leader
- Assi Azar (born 1979), Israeli television host
- Assi Baldout (born 1981), Israeli footballer and manager
- Assi Cohen (born 1974), Israeli comedian and actor
- Assi Dayan (1945–2014), Israeli actor and film director
- Assi El Hallani (born 1970), Lebanese singer
- Assi Guma (born 1989), Israeli footballer
- Hans "Assi" Hahn (1914–1982), German World War II fighter ace
- Assi Nortia (1925–1989), Finnish actor
- Assi Rahbani (1923–1986), Lebanese musician and producer
- Assi Tubi (born 1972), Israeli footballer

== People with the surname ==
- Abbas Assi (born 1995), Lebanese footballer
- Bachir Hani Abou Assi (born 1948), Lebanese wrestler
- Elias Abou Assi (born 1950), Lebanese politician
- Ernest Patili Assi (1936–1996), Togolese cleric
- Gabriel Achy Assi (born 1938), Ivorian boxer
- Ilham Mahdi al Assi (died 2010), Yemeni child bride and marital rape victim
- Jana Assi (born 1999), Lebanese footballer
- Jean-Aniel Assi (born 2004), Canadian soccer player
- Lamia Assi (born 1955), Syrian politician
- Pacôme Assi (born 1981), French kickboxer
- Zena Assi (born 1974), Lebanese artist

== Places ==
- Assi Ghat, a Hindu holy site in India
- Assi Kalan, a village in India
- Assi Khurd, a village in India
- Assi Youcef, a town and commune in Algeria
- Ghawr al-Assi, a village in Syria
- Qubaybat al-Assi, a village in Syria

== Other ==
- ASSI Giglio Rosso, an Italian athletics club
- Assi IF, a Finnish football club
- Assi S.S. Milano, an Italian basketball club
- Assi (film), a 2026 Indian Hindi-language film

== See also ==
- ASSI (disambiguation), multiple acronyms
- AASI (disambiguation)
- ASI (disambiguation)
- Assis (disambiguation)
