= Tasnin =

Tasnin تسنين
- Village
- Location in Syria
- Coordinates: 34°52′10″N 36°39′29″E
- Country: Syria
- Governorate: Homs
- District: Rastan
- Subdistrict: Rastan

Population (2004)
  - Total: 2,713
- Time zone: UTC+3 (EET)
  - Summer (DST): UTC+2 (EEST)

Tasnin (Arabic: تسنين, romanized: Tāsnīn, also spelled Tasneen) is a village in middle of Syria, northern of Homs administratively part of the Homs Governorate, located 20 kilometers northwest of Homs in between the cities of al-Rastan and Talbisehto West Alaasee River . Other nearby localities include Kafr Nan and Kissin to the northwest, Gharnatah to the northeast and Akrad Dayasinah to the southwest.

According to the Syria Central Bureau of Statistics (CBS), Tasnin had a population of 2,713 in the 2004 census. half of its inhabitants are Turkmen Sunni Muslims, and the other half Alawites. Tasnin's inhabitants mostly work in agriculture and husbandry. The village has three schools and a mosque.
