= Northern Homs offensive (April–May 2018) =

Offensive by the Syrian Armed Forces

- Part of Part of the Siege of Northern Homs of the Syrian Civil War
Date	Offensive: 15–20 April 2018 (5 days); Rebel surrender and withdrawal: 29 April – 16 May 2018 (2 weeks and 3 days)
Location	Northern Homs Governorate and southern Hama Governorate, western Syria
Result	Syrian government victory
Territorial changes	Syrian government forces regain full control of the northern Homs pocket, including Rastan, Talbiseh, and Houla

Belligerents
(Syria) Syrian Government	Syrian Opposition; Syrian Salvation Government (surrendered); Central Region Command (surrendered)

Commanders and leaders
Maj. Gen. Muhamamd Khaddour	Col. Ibrahim Bakkar (head of Central Region Command); Col. Omar Melhem (surrendered) (Tawhid Army commander); Lt. Col. Talal al-Mansour (4th Legion commander) Ahmed Abu Zeid (Homs Army commander)

Units involved
Syrian Armed Forces; Syrian Army; 4th Armoured Division; Syrian Air Force; National Defence Forces	Central Region Command; 4th Legion; Ahrar al-Sham; Homs Legion; Right Brigade; Tawhid Army; Homs Army; National Liberation Movement; Brigade 313 – Soldiers of Badr; Sham Legion; Army of Glory; Hay'at Tahrir al-Sham

Casualties and losses
Unknown	Unknown
- 21+ civilians killed

The Northern Homs offensive was launched by the Syrian Armed Forces against the rebel pocket in the northern Homs Governorate and the southern Hama Governorate on 15 April 2018. It came after the defeat of the rebel forces in the final government offensive against rebels in eastern Ghouta. Following negotiations with Syrian and Russian military officials, rebels surrendered the northern Homs pocket on 2 May, and those who refused to stay were fully evacuated on 16 May. Subsequently, the Syrian government regained full control of the area.

== Offensive ==
On 15 April, the Syrian Arab Army (SAA) launched an offensive in the northern Homs rebel pocket following the failure of rebel groups to abide by the government's terms in previous negotiations. The SAA targeted rebel positions in the southwestern part of Salamiyah District. On the following day, the SAA advanced from the recently captured village of Salim to the nearby Hamrat.

On 17 April, rebel forces in and around the city of Rastan called for an urgent meeting with Russian military negotiators to organize a new settlement agreement. Sources reported that the rebel delegation would seek an agreement on reconciliation similar to what Jaysh al-Islam fighters in Douma received, so that only Russian and Syrian military police will enter the dedicated settlements instead of regular Syrian military forces. On the evening of the same day, rebels captured the village of Qubbat al-Kurdi. Rebel forces also had reportedly cut off drinking water supplies to the Salamiyah region.

On 18 April, a four-day ceasefire was announced after the rebel delegation met with Russian military police at the Dar al-Kabira crossing in northern Homs. However, the rebel delegation denied that an agreement was reached.

== Rebel surrender and evacuation ==
In the morning of 29 April, more than 70 airstrikes and 500 artillery shells hit Rastan, Talbiseh, and other rebel-held towns in the northern Homs pocket. At least 7 civilians were killed and 46 wounded by the bombings. In the afternoon, rebel representatives resumed negotiations with a Russian delegation, and the bombings were paused. The negotiations resulted in another temporary ceasefire agreement, and the SAA issued an ultimatum to the rebels, giving them between 48 and 72 hours to surrender and accept evacuation with the threat of launching a military offensive if they refused.

On 2 May, the rebel delegation reached an agreement to hand over their heavy weapons, withdraw to either the greater Idlib area or the Turkish-occupied northern Aleppo Governorate, and allow the government to take over the pocket. However, the 4th Legion, based in Taldou, rejected the agreement. Demonstrations were held in Rastan both supporting and opposing the government and the rebels.

On 7 May, the evacuation of an estimated 2,900 rebel fighters and civilians by buses, under the supervision of Russian military police, began at a departure point in Rastan. The majority of civilians in the area chose to stay, and were given six months to reconcile with the government. On 9 May, three convoys of buses carrying around 8,000 people evacuated from northern Homs and southern Damascus were stopped at a crossing near the city of al-Bab. The Syrian Arab Red Crescent coordinated the arrival of the convoys with Turkish forces, but the buses were stuck due to lack of coordination between rebels and Turkish officials, poor logistics, and Turkish refusal to allow entry.
