= Burj Qa'i =

Burj Qa'i برج قاعي Burj al-Qa'y al-Burj
- Village
- Location in Syria
- Coordinates: 34°52′56″N 36°34′35″E
- Country: Syria
- Governorate: Homs Governorate
- District: Homs District
- Nahiya: Taldou

Population (2004)
  - Total: 2,351
- Time zone: UTC+3 (AST)

Burj Qa'i (Arabic: برج قاعي, also spelled Burj al-Qa'y, Burj Kai or simply al-Burj) is a village in central Syria, administratively part of the Homs Governorate, located northwest of Homs. Nearby localities include Taldou and the Houla 5 kilometers to the west, Talaf to the north, Kisin to the northeast, Kafr Nan to the east, Tasnin and Akrad Dayasinah to the southeast and Ghur Gharbiyah to the south. According to the Syria Central Bureau of Statistics (CBS), Burj Qa'i had a population of 2,351 in the 2004 census. Its inhabitants are predominantly Sunni Muslims and ethnic Turkmens.

During the Roman era in Syria, Burj Qa'i was a village of army veterans by the 3rd-century CE. The local pagan deity was Semea, a goddess previously worshiped in northern areas of Syria. A temple dedicated to Semea was constructed in 196-97 upon the decision of the village's Council of Six. Christianity later spread to Burj Qa'i during the Byzantine period, as evidenced by the existence of a Christian tomb in the village dating to 457. A Christian martyrion built in 539-40 through funds raised by a bishop named Peter also exists in Burj Qa'i. The building's construction was supervised by the episcopal officials Leontius and Isaiah, who were oikonomos. Pagans and Christians inhabited Burj al-Qa'i simultaneously in the period between 457 and 532.

In 1838, during late Ottoman rule, Burj al-Qa'i was classified as a Muslim village, by Americal biblical scholar Eli Smith. The village was also mentioned in passing in the fifth volume of the Bibliotheca Sacra in the mid-1840s.

In the aftermath of the Houla massacre on 25 May 2012, during the ongoing Syrian civil war, Burj Qa'i hosted around 5,000 refugees fleeing nearby Taldou, the scene of the massacre. Most refugees took shelter in schools, public buildings or the homes of host families. The International Committee of the Red Cross (ICRC) visited in June to provide food, medicines and mattresses to the displaced. In early October 2012 Syrian state television reported that Syrian Army forces killed several opposition fighters in Burj Qa'i. The town was also occasionally targeted by Russian Federation through its air raid campaigns, with 7-9 civilian deaths recorded in one instance. The town ultimately came under the control of the rebel forces led by HTS between 6-8 December 2024 as part of the 2024 Syrian opposition offensives, during the rebel offensive to take Homs city following the defeat of the government forces in Hama.

== Bibliography ==
- Edwards, B. B. (1848). Bibliotheca Sacra. Vol. 5. Dallas Theological Seminary.
- Robinson, E.; Smith, E. (1841). Biblical Researches in Palestine, Mount Sinai and Arabia Petraea: A Journal of Travels in the year 1838. Vol. 3. Boston: Crocker & Brewster.
- Trombley, Frank R. (2001). Hellenic Religion and Christianization, C. 370-529, Volume 2. BRILL. p. 154. ISBN 9780391041219.
