= Kafr Nan =

Kafr Nan كفرنان
- Village
- Location in Syria
- Coordinates: 34°53′11″N 36°38′53″E
- Country: Syria
- Governorate: Homs
- District: Al-Rastan
- Subdistrict: Al-Rastan

Population (2004)
  - Total: 3,231
- Time zone: UTC+3 (EET)
  - Summer (DST): UTC+2 (EEST)

Kafr Nan (Arabic: كفرنان, romanized: Kafrnan, also spelled Kfarnan) is a village in northern Syria, administratively part of the Homs Governorate, located north of Homs.

== Surroundings ==
Nearby localities include Burj Qa'i to the west, Kisin to the northwest, Gharnatah to the northeast, al-Zaafaraniyah to the east, Talbiseh to the southeast, Tasnin to the south and Akrad Dayasinah to the southeast.

== Population ==
According to the Syria Central Bureau of Statistics (CBS), Kafr Nan had a population of 3,231 in the 2004 census. Its inhabitants are predominantly Alawites.

== History ==
In 1838, its inhabitants were recorded to be Sunni Muslims.

== Bibliography ==
- Robinson, E.; Smith, E. (1841). Biblical Researches in Palestine, Mount Sinai and Arabia Petraea: A Journal of Travels in the year 1838. Vol. 3. Boston: Crocker & Brewster.
