= Rastan =

Rastan may refer to:

- Al-Rastan, a city in Syria
- Al-Rastan District, a district in Syria
- Rastan (video game), a 1987 arcade video game from Taito
