= Al-Zaafaraniyah =

Al-Zaafaraniyah الزعفرانية
- Village
- Location in Syria
- Coordinates: 34°53′43″N 36°46′41″E
- Country: Syria
- Governorate: Homs
- District: Al-Rastan
- Subdistrict: Talbiseh

Population (2004)
  - Total: 5,102
- Time zone: UTC+3 (EET)
  - Summer (DST): UTC+2 (EEST)

Al-Zaafaraniyah (Arabic: الزعفرانية, also spelled al-Za'afaranah) is a village in the northern Syria, administratively part of the Homs Governorate, located north of Homs. Nearby localities include Mashrafah to the southeast, Talbiseh to the southwest, Tasnin and Kafr Nan to the west, al-Rastan to the northwest and Deir Ful and Izz al-Din to the northeast. According to the Syria Central Bureau of Statistics (CBS), al-Zaafaraniyah had a population of 5,102 in the 2004 census.

In 1838 al-Zaafaraniyah was classified as a seasonal village or khirba by English scholar Eli Smith.

== Syrian Civil War ==
On 8 May 2022, a man associated with the Syrian Army's Intelligence Directorate was shot dead by unidentified gunmen in the village.

== Bibliography ==
- Smith, Eli; Robinson, Edward (1841). Biblical Researches in Palestine, Mount Sinai and Arabia Petraea: A Journal of Travels in the Year 1838. Vol. 3. Crocker and Brewster.
