= Siege of Northern Homs =

2010s siege by the Syrian government

- Part of the Syrian Civil War
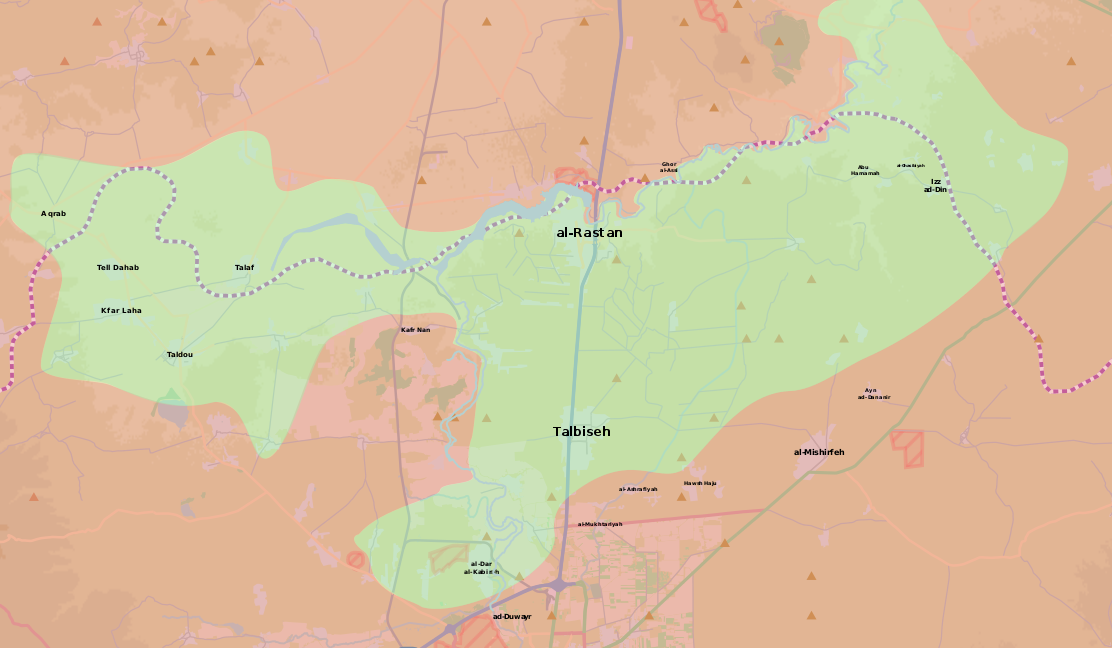
- Map of the rebel held pocket in Rastan and surrounding areas
Date	14 May 2012 – 29 April 2018 (5 years, 11 months, 2 weeks and 1 day)
Location	Syria: Northern Homs Governorate; Southern Hama Governorate
Result	Syrian government victory: Evacuation deal for rebel fighters; Syrian government reopens Homs-Hama highway and Damascus-Hama highway after the rebels are driven out of the area
Territorial changes	Syrian Army recapture the rebel-held pocket in Northern Homs

Belligerents
(Syria) Syrian Arab Republic: Syrian Armed Forces; Military Intelligence Directorate; Russia (From 2015); Syrian Social Nationalist Party; Ba'ath Brigades; Hezbollah; Shiite Militias	Northern Homs Countryside Operation Room (2015–2018); Ahrar al-Sham; Tahrir al-Sham (2017–2018, Al-Nusra Front until 2016); Sham Legion; Jaysh al-Izza; Homs Legion; Ajnad al-Homs; 313 Badr Brigade; Free Syrian Army; Jaysh al-Nasr; Harakat al-Fedayeen (From 2015); Central Region Command; National Liberation Movement; Bani Khalid Tribesmen; Authenticity and Development Front; Tawhid Army; Houla Operations Room (From 2015); Liwa Ahfad Othman; Brigade 313 – Free Men of Aqrab; Jaysh al-Thuwar (2015); Hazzm Movement (2014); Ansar al-Khilafah (From 2013)	Islamic State of Iraq and the Levant Jund al-Sham: Assoud al-Islam Brigade; Bayada Martyr's Brigade (Allegedly by al-Nusra); Ahlul Sunnah wal Jama’a

Commanders and leaders
Gen. Hassan Daaboul †; Ibrahim Darwish (WIA); Suheil al-Hassan	Abu Omar al-Ghota; Abu Khalid al-Hamuy †; Abu Ramah al-Hamuy †; Amir Musa Hableut †; Rawad al-Aksah †; Abdul Baset al-Sarout	Rafid Taha; Abu Dawud (Ahlul Sunnah wal Jama’a leader)

Units involved
Syrian Armed Forces; Syrian Army; Tiger Forces; 4th Armoured Division; Syrian Air Force; National Defence Forces; Russian Armed Forces; Aerospace Forces	Free Syrian Army; Jaysh al-Thuwar; Liwa Ahfad Othman (Until 2015); Harakat al-Fedayeen (Until 2015); Brigade 313 – Free Men of Aqrab (Until 2015); Regiment 777 (From 2015); Gathering Homs Revolutionaries; Khalid ibn al-Walid Brigade; National Liberation Movement; Farouq Brigades; Regiment 777 (Until 2015); al-Qadisiya Brigades; Herr Binafsah Brigade; Central Region Command; Ahrar al-Sham; Homs Legion; Tawhid Army; Sham Legion factions; Free Syrian Army factions; Homs Army; Brigade 313 – Soldiers of Badr; Tawhid Brigade; Bayada Martyr's Brigade; Authenticity and Development Front; Tawhid Army; Tajamuu Alwiyat al-Iman Billah; Liwa Hamah al-Aqidah; Lions of Islam Brigade; Talbisah Brigade; Falcons of Talbisah Brigade; Muawiyah Ibn Abi Sufyan Brigade; Sword of Islam Battalion; Tajamuu Alwiyat wa Kataib Suyuf al-Haq; Kataib Abd al-Rahman	Badr battalion Sadr battalion

Strength
Unknown	3,000 (2018 Russian estimate)	Unknown

The siege of Northern Homs was a siege lasting six years, by the Syrian government in the northern part of the Homs Governorate during the Syrian civil war, as a result of the rebel capture of Rastan and surrounding areas in 2012, the rebel-held pocket in northern Homs was fully taken by the Syrian government in 2018 after clearing opposition held areas around the capital.

== Background ==
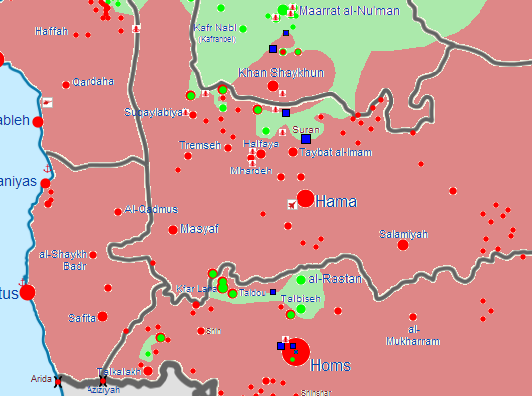
The besieged Homs pocket in October 2013

The siege saw several instances of clashes between Pro-Government forces and the rebels resulting in a series of indecisive fighting with limited gains from either side until the Syrian government's offensive in early 2018 ending the six year-long siege of the area, during the siege pro-government forces held the Zara thermal plant which became subject to targeting by opposition forces as a result. The town of Talbiseh had been a major opposition stronghold since 2011 and had been subject to another siege carried out by the Syrian government in 2011 along with Rastan resulting in the death of 74 civilians which suppressed protests in the two towns.

== History ==
On 14 May 2012, the Free Syrian Army took control of the town of al-Rastan after a series of offensives in early 2012, which had been a strategic location along the road which links the capital Damascus to the north of the country.

In January 2013, after the establishment of the Hizb ut-Tahrir-linked Ansar al-Khilafah in December 2012 a branch of the group was established in the Homs governorate.

On 10 October 2014, Free Syrian Army units took the al-Hilaliyeh village from government forces resulting in decreased shelling from the government.

On 29 November 2014, Al-Nusra took control of al-Rastan from the Free Syrian Army aligned Hazzm Movement during the conflict between the two after clashes in the area resulting in the capture of several FSA fighters and the establishment of al-Nusra Front run checkpoints in the town.

In December 2014, the commander of the Asoud al-Islam Brigade based in Talbiseh announced that the brigade had pledged allegiance to Abu Bakr al-Baghdadi and the Islamic State of Iraq and the Levant, however after the announcement reportedly 400 out of the 500 members left the group.

In May 2015, several Free Syrian Army factions in the area joined the then newly formed Jaysh al-Thuwar group and pledged to fight against both the Syrian government and ISIL, the group was seen as a consolidation of Democratic FSA groups under one banner, among the groups involved in the formation of Jaysh al-Thuwar in Homs included Regiment 777 which was part of the Farouq Brigades, after joining Jaysh al-Thuwar Regiment 777 published a video of the group operating a technical and firing upon pro-government forces. However, after joining Jaysh al-Thuwar three units initially joining the group left with two joining the Houla Operations Room and another joining Jaysh al-Nasr which at the time was an operations room prior to its unification as a single group, leaving only Regiment 777 and the Gathering of Homs Revolutionaries as the remaining Jaysh al-Thuwar factions in Homs.

On 16 August 2015, Al-Nusra and the Free Syrian Army launched an offensive against pro-government forces in the villages of Jiboureen and Tisneen in the Rastan plains, al-Nusra and the FSA successfully captured two checkpoints outside the village of Tisneen however the National Defense Forces and Ba'ath Brigades counter-attacked and reestablished control over town.

In October 2015, the Syrian military fired several rockets and mortars at al-Nusra and FSA positions to reportedly prepare for an offensive against the pocket in coordination with the National Defence Forces and the SSNP.

On 15 October 2015, Russian and Syrian warplanes conducted several airstrikes on rebel-held areas resulting in the death of 5 civilians and 6 fighters including Rawad al-Aksah a Tawhid Brigade commander.

In November 2015, Al-Nusra attacked positions held by the Bayada Martyr's Brigade, accusing the group and one of its notable members, Abdul Baset al-Sarout of pledging allegiance to ISIL. Activists claimed al-Nusra was seeking to consolidate power in northern Homs in doing so, as well as seize a strategic entry point for food and other goods, and undermine the popularity of Sarout.

Logo of the rebel Northern Homs Countryside Operation Room

On 31 January 2016, Ahrar al-Sham, the al-Qadisiya Brigades, and the Herr Binafsah Brigade created an operation room in the pocket to respond to attacks from Shiite militias in parts of Homs and Hama with Russian air support.

On 2 August 2016, Jabhat Fateh al-Sham, Ahrar al-Sham, the Homs Legion and several other factions in the Northern Homs operation room launched an offensive, called "Support of Aleppo" against government forces, to divert attention from Aleppo where another rebel offensive was active against pro-government forces. The offensive was aimed at taking the Zara Thermal Plant, which is among the largest electrical plants in Syria, several power outages were reportedly caused as a result of the fighting between the rebels and the government. During the offensive the rebels successfully took control of the village of Zara, several casualties were reported among pro-Assad forces, and Ahrar al-Sham reportedly captured a tank and a BMP.

Syrian Army offensive from December 2015 to January 2016

The Syrian Army launched an offensive from late December 2016 to early January 2017, capturing captures Jarjisah, Deir al-Fardis, and 10 other villages.

On 27 January 2017, water was completely cutoff from the pocket and its 10,000 civilian residents, causing the local council's president Yousef Darwish to appeal the council for aid however there was no aid that could be provided as there were no resources available.

On 18 February 2017, Ahrar al-Sham targeted pro-government positions with rockets, mortars and improvised rockets in response to the targeting of civilian areas by the government.

On 22 February 2017, Hayat Tahrir al-Sham attacked government positions along the Homs-Salamiyah highway with artillery and tanks.

On 25 February 2017, Hayat Tahrir al-Sham deployed an Inghimasi team to Homs city from the Rastan pocket resulting in the death of General Hassan Daabul and intelligence chief Ibrahim Darwish and several other pro-government fighters, the attacked was celebrated Abdullah al-Muhaysini on his Arabic and English Telegram channels with him saying, "The killing and wounding of tens due to the detonating of explosive devices in the checkpoints of the criminal Regime while they were treating the wounded from the Military Security and National Security branches. All thanks is to Allah." On the same day Ahrar al-Sham continued to shell government positions with SPG-9s, rockets, and mortars.

On 15 June 2017, Government forces attempted to infiltrate rebel positions near Jaboreen however the Northern Homs Countryside Operation Room repelled the attack with Jaysh al-Izza leading the defense of the area.

In December 2017, A humanitarian organization established a child-friendly space in the rebel-held pocket as part of an afforestation campaign aimed at teaching responsibility to children and raising awareness to the importance of wildlife.

On 27 April 2018, Pro-Government activists began reporting that the Syrian government's tiger forces under the command of Suheil al-Hassan began redeploying from East Ghouta, while on the same day Hezbollah claimed the Syrian army had shelled the headquarters of Hayat Tahrir al-Sham resulting in the death of two commanders from the group. While two weeks prior the Syrian army had launched four attacks against rebel forces however they were all repelled due to insufficient firepower on behalf of pro-government forces.

On 29 April 2018, after reinforcements arrived, the Syrian government resumed attacks on the pocket by conducting 70 airstrikes and firing 500 artillery shells resulting in the death of 70 civilians and leaving 46 others injured, by the afternoon of the day rebel forces began negotiations with a Russian delegation resulting in a temporary cease-fire giving the rebels 48–72 hours to withdraw from Homs, by 2 May an agreement had been made to allow rebel forces to evacuate to Idlib or areas held by Turkey and the FSA in northern Aleppo, several demonstrations were held in response to the government's attacks and rebel surrender both in support of the opposition and against it, by 9 May 8000 individuals from Damascus and Homs began to evacuate to al-Bab however were temporarily stuck because of coordination issues which were later resolved effectively ending rebel-control over the pocket and the six year long government imposed siege.
