= Hirbnafsah =

Hirbnafsah حر بنفسه
- Town
- Location in Syria
- Coordinates: 34°56′14″N 36°37′18″E
- Country: Syria
- Governorate: Hama
- District: Hama
- Subdistrict: Hirbnafsah

Population (2004)
  - Total: 3,574
- Time zone: UTC+3 (AST)

Hirbnafsah (Arabic: حر بنفسه, romanized: Hīrbnafseh, also spelled Harb Nafseh) is a town in northwestern Syria, administratively part of the Hama Governorate, southwest of Hama. Nearby localities include Deir al-Fardis to the north, Tumin and al-Rastan to the east, Kisin and Kafr Nan to the south, Talaf to the southwest, . According to the Central Bureau of Statistics (CBS), Hirbnafsah had a population of 3,574 in the 2004 census. It is the administrative center and sixth largest locality of the Hirbnafsah nahiyah ("subdistrict") which consists of 26 localities with a collective population of 54,592. Its inhabitants are predominantly Sunni Muslims.

The Syria geographer Yaqut al-Hamawi mentioned that Hirbnafsah was "a village of Hims" when he visited in 1225 during Ayyubid rule.

During the ongoing Syrian civil war, which began in 2011, opposition sources claimed that 40 people in Hirbnafsa were killed as a result of Syrian Army and pro-government militia bombardment on 6 August 2012. Other opposition accounts put the fatality figure at 11, including five children.

== Bibliography ==
- Le Strange, G. (1890). Palestine Under the Moslems: A Description of Syria and the Holy Land from A.D. 650 to 1500. Committee of the Palestine Exploration Fund.
- Robinson, E.; Smith, E. (1841). Biblical Researches in Palestine, Mount Sinai and Arabia Petraea: A Journal of Travels in the year 1838. Vol. 3. Boston: Crocker & Brewster.
