= Zamaymer =

Zaymaymer (Arabic: زميمير) is a village in central Syria, administratively part of the Ar-Rastan district located within the Homs Governorate. According to Syria's 2004 Census, the village had a population of 540.

== Syrian Civil War ==
The village was shelled several times by the Assad Government during the course of the Syrian Civil War.
