= Orontes River offensive =

Syrian military operation

- Part of the Siege of Northern Homs, Syrian Civil War
- Map of the offensive
Date	30 December 2015 – 20 January 2016 (3 weeks)
Location	Hama Governorate, Syria
Result	Partial Syrian Army victory
Territorial changes	Syrian Army captures Jarjisah, Deir al-Fardis and 10 other villages, while Harbinfsah and Al-Zarrah remained contested

Belligerents
(Syrian opposition) Free Syrian Army; Ahrar ash-Sham; Al-Nusra Front	Syrian Government; Air strikes: Russia

Units involved
Unknown	Syrian Armed Forces; Syrian Army; 11th Tank Division; 47th Brigade; 66th Brigade; 67th Brigade; National Defense Force; Ba'ath Brigades; Russian Armed Forces; Russian Air Force

Casualties and losses
86+ killed	Unknown

The Orontes River offensive was a military operation launched by the Syrian Arab Army against rebels during the Syrian Civil War on the administrative border of the Hama Governorate and Homs Governorate, along the Orontes River.

== The offensive ==
The offensive commenced on 30 December 2015, and by 3 January, the Army took control of 10–11 villages in the southeastern countryside of Hama along the Orontes River, one of them being Jarniyah that leads to the eastern deserts of Homs province. The advances also secured the Hama-Salamiyah road.

On 11 January, the military's focus shifted to the southern countryside of Hama. They started an attack the village of Jarjisah, on the administrative border between Hama and Homs provinces, and on the northern bank of the Orontes River. Before the assault, government troops issued a deadline to the rebels to surrender, which was ignored. By the next day, the Army captured the village, and immediately started to shell the nearby rebel-held village of Harbinafsah, in preparation for an assault there as well.

On 13 January, the Army temporarily seized Harbinafsah, but withdrew 24 hours later, positioning themselves on its northern outskirts.

In the night between 14 and 15 January, following heavy fighting, an agreement was reached between government forces and the citizens of Deir al-Fardis, leading to the Army's capture of the village. Meanwhile, heavy clashes took place around Harbinafsah, as the Army advanced in the area. The government force's advances over the previous several days had cut off rebel supply lines to the city of Al-Rastan and its surrounding area.

On 18 January, the military once again entered the northern part of Harbinafsah. The same day, Islamist rebels posted images on social media of beheaded soldiers in the contested village. The next day, the rebels reportedly seized the al-Bashakir factory checkpoint on the outskirts of Harbinfsah. On 20 January, the Army renewed its offensive and captured the al-Madajen area north of Harbinfsah, while also reportedly advancing into the southern part of the nearby village of Al-Zarrah.

The offensive had cut off 120,000 people in the northern part of Homs province, according to the U.N., leading to increased hunger and patients dying due to a lack of medical care.
