= Gharnatah =

Gharnatah غرناطة al-Ghajar
- Village
- Location in Syria
- Coordinates: 34°53′45″N 36°41′4″E
- Country: Syria
- Governorate: Homs
- District: Rastan
- Subdistrict: Rastan

Population (2004)
  - Total: 5,366
- Time zone: UTC+3 (EET)
  - Summer (DST): UTC+2 (EEST)

Gharnatah (Arabic: غرناطة, romanized: al-Gharnātah) or al-Ghajar (Arabic: الغجر, romanized: al-Ghājar also known as Ghajar Amir) is a village in northern Syria, administratively part of the Rastan District, located north of Homs. According to the Syria Central Bureau of Statistics (CBS), Gharnatah had a population of 5,366 in the 2004 census. Its inhabitants are predominantly Sunni Muslims of Turkmen descent.
