= Al-Ghantu =

al-Ghantu الغنطو
- Village
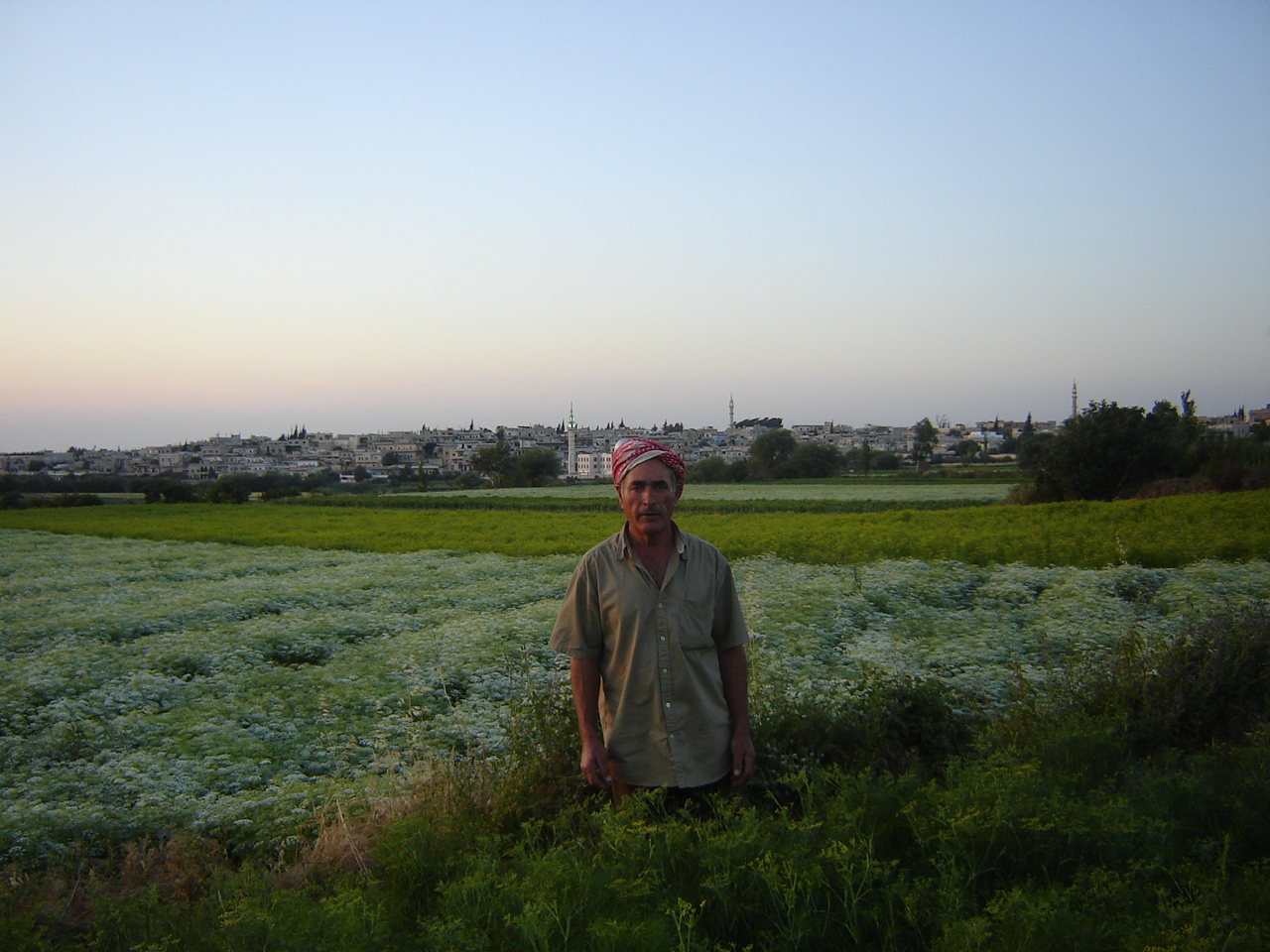
- al-Ghantu skyline, 2006

- Location in Syria
- Coordinates: 34°49′20″N 36°41′46″E
- Country: Syria
- Governorate: Homs
- District: Al-Rastan
- Subdistrict: Talbiseh

Population (2004)
  - Total: 9,412
- Time zone: UTC+3 (EET)
  - Summer (DST): UTC+2 (EEST)

Al-Ghantoo (Arabic: الغنطو) or al-Ghantu, ALA-LC: al-Ghānṭū: but the original name is spelled: الغُنْثُر/ Al-Ghonthor, which means the land of fountains) is a town in the west of Syria, administratively part of the Homs Governorate, located 12 km (7.5 mi) north of Homs. Nearby towns include Talbisa to the northeast and Taldou further to the northwest. According to the Central Bureau of Statistics (CBS), al-Ghantu had a population of 9,412 in 2004. Its inhabitants are predominantly Sunni Muslims, many of whom are Turkmens.

Most of its residents work in agriculture, and many farmers specialize in vegetables such as lettuce, cabbage, tomatoes, carrots, peppers and others. Olive groves have increased annually. There are many places of interest in the village including old Ancient Roman bridges and water mills on the al-Assali River which passes through the west side of the village.

== Syrian civil war ==
On 11 June 2012, anti-government fighters from the Free Syrian Army (FSA) attacked the small military airbase situated in al-Ghantu, as part of the Syrian revolution against President Bashar al-Assad. The FSA was quickly repelled by a Syrian Army counterattack, but managed to withdraw with hundreds of looted weapons and ammunition. According to FSA officials, they were able to enter the base after being aided by 22 sympathetic soldiers and officers stationed at the base.

On 5 February 2013, the town was shelled by the Syrian Army and allied militias.

== Gallery ==
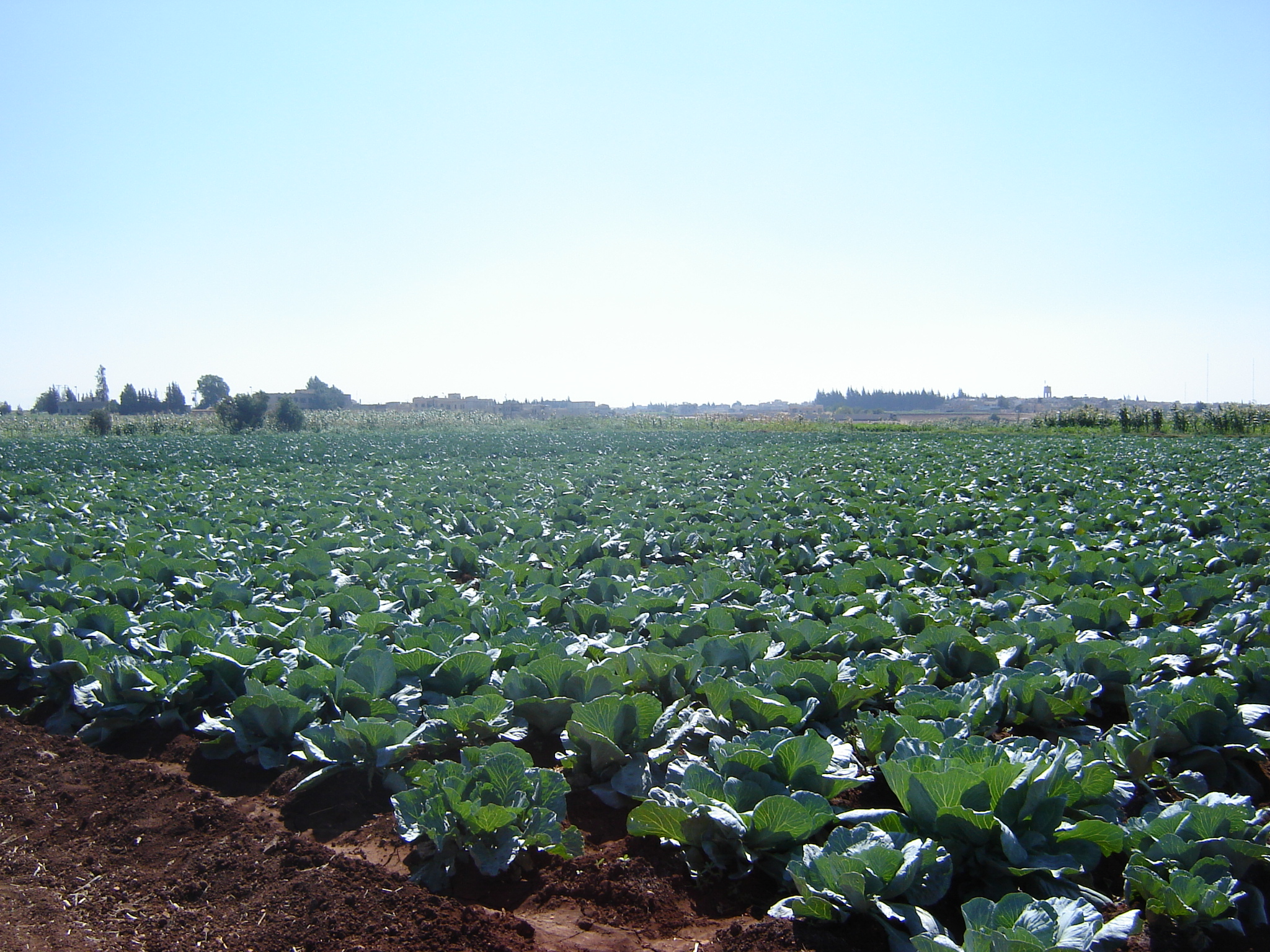
Cabbage field, 2006

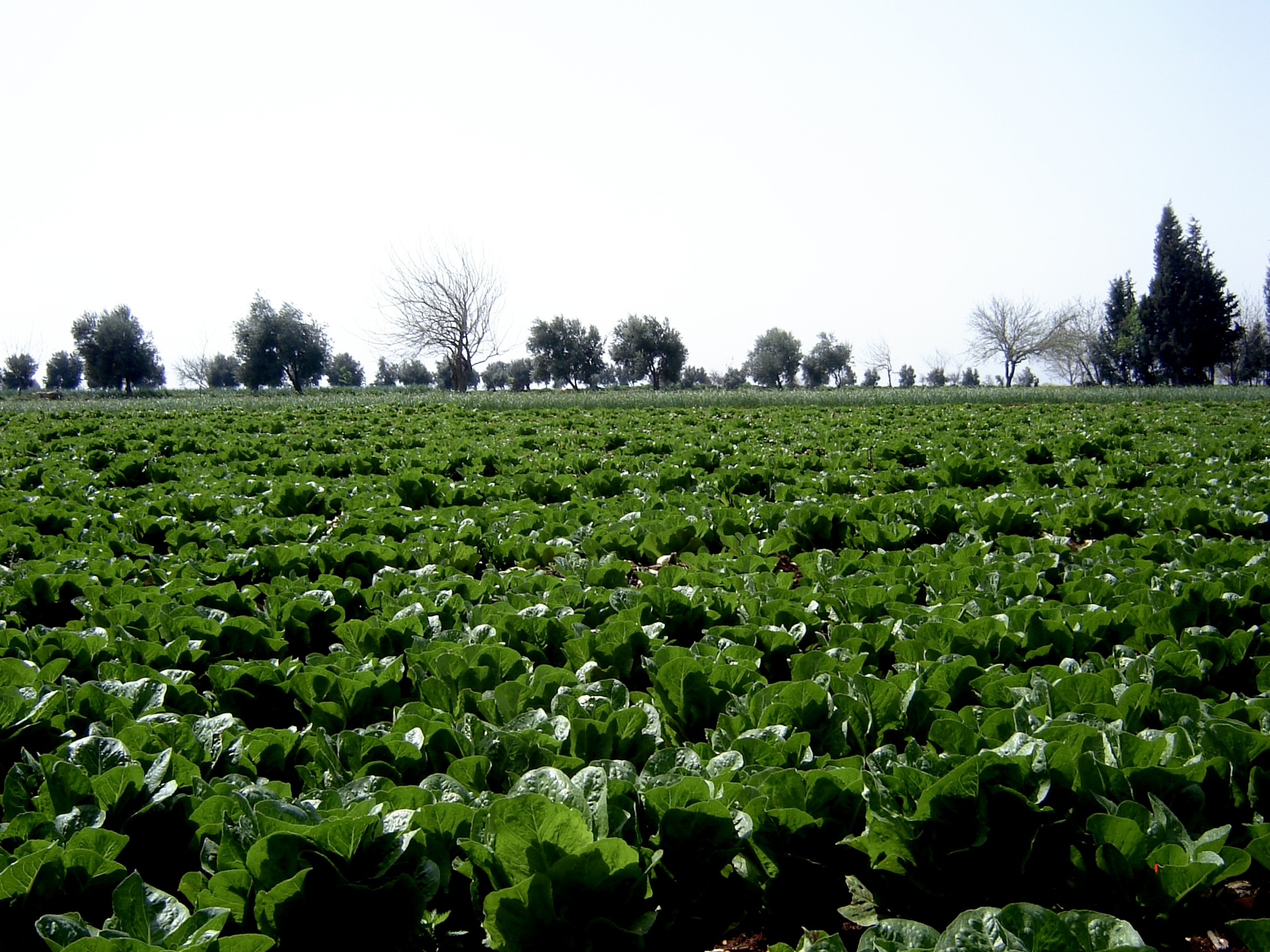
Lettuce field, 2009

== Bibliography ==
- Smith, Eli; Robinson, Edward (1841). Biblical Researches in Palestine, Mount Sinai and Arabia Petraea: A Journal of Travels in the Year 1838. Vol. 3. Crocker and Brewster.
