= Siege of Rastan and Talbiseh =

Operation by the Syrian Army during the Civil War

Coordinates: 34.9167°N 36.7333°E

- Part of the Syrian revolution and the Syrian civil war
- Location: Rastan and Talbiseh, Syria
- Planned by: Gen. Maher al-Assad; Gen. Yousef Ismail; Gen. Ali Hamdan
- Target: Opposition protestors
- Objective: Suppress protests
- Date: 28 May – 4 June 2011 (1 week)
- Executed by: Syrian Army: 4th Division (42nd brigade); 8th Division (60th, 120th, 134th, 167th brigades)
- Outcome: Protests suppressed
- Casualties: 74 civilians killed(U.S Claimed); 6 soldiers killed

The siege of Rastan and Talbiseh was an operation by the Syrian Army during the Syrian revolution. On 28 May 2011, after protests and an armed revolt, the Syrian Army launched an operation in al-Rastan, a city of an estimated 50,000 residents located 20 kilometers north of Homs, and the neighboring town of Talbiseh, which resulted in the suppression of the protests and numerous deaths. The Syrian Army met some armed opposition during the siege.

== Background ==
In mid-April 2011, large anti-government protests began in Rastan and the neighboring town of Talbiseh. On 29 April, some 50 members of the ruling Ba'ath Party resigned in Rastan. Soon after, while notice of the resignations was being read out at a large protest, Military Intelligence personnel allegedly shot and killed 17 demonstrators. A week later—after anti-government protesters toppled a statue of the late Syrian president Hafez al-Assad and pledged to press ahead with their protests despite sweeping arrests by Bashar al-Assad's government—around 100 tanks and troop transports converged on and encircled the town of Rastan. Throughout May 2011, protests continued in Rastan and the neighboring areas.

== The operation ==
On Saturday, 28 May 2011, the Syrian military entered the towns of Rastan and Talbiseh, a day after their biggest demonstrations so far. The opposition reported shooting in Talbiseh and said that soldiers were breaking into homes and arresting people. The operation began after the security forces cut-off all water supplies, electricity and telecommunications in the area and blocked all roads leading to the two towns. On Sunday, 29 May, a mortar shell hit a school bus carrying children in Talbiseh, residents told Al Jazeera. An ambulance trying to rescue them was also targeted, but the wounded students were eventually allowed to be transported to the nearest hospital in Deir Balba, they said.

On Monday, 30 May, it was reported that residents of Rastan and Talbiseh had fired at the army with assault rifles and RPGs. A resident of Homs said "The army is facing armed resistance and is not able to enter the two towns ... The army is still outside the towns and I was told that army vehicles, including armoured personnel carriers, were set on fire". Another opposition activist confirmed residents had fought back, but said it involved lone residents protecting themselves rather than an organized armed resistance with an overall command structure. The opposition's Local Coordination Committees said that the army hit Talbiseh with artillery early in the day, and that snipers were deployed on the roofs of mosques.

Opposition activists reported that at least two people were killed by Syrian Army artillery and machine-gun fire in Rastan on 4 June.

== Aftermath ==
In late September 2011, there were reports of more army defections in Rastan, and the Free Syrian Army claimed to have destroyed 17 armored vehicles during clashes in the city, using RPGs and booby traps. On 1 October, the Syrian Army took control of Rastan, killing 130 civilians and opposition forces and arresting 3,000 suspected opposition members, according to activist sources.
