= Talbiseh bakery massacre =

2012 military operation of the Syrian civil war

- Part of the Syrian Civil War
- Location: 34°50′0″N 36°44′0″E; Talbiseh
- Date: 24 December 2012
- Attack type: Airstrike
- Deaths: 14
- Perpetrator: Syrian Army (Disputed by Govt.)

The Talbiseh bakery massacre (Arabic: مجزرة مخبز تلبيسة) took place in the town of Talbiseh on December 24, 2012, during the Syrian Civil War. More than 14 people were killed, and armed opposition activists claimed that was the result of bombing from warplanes from the Syrian government, while Syria's state news service blamed the attack on "an armed terrorist group", accusing them of filming the aftermath to "frame the Syrian army.". The civilians in the city were killed while queuing for bread at a local bakery. This massacre occurred one day after the Halfaya massacre.
