= AASI =

AASI may refer to:

- Advanced Aerodynamics and Structures Inc., an aircraft maker
- American Association of Snowboard Instructors, an offshoot of the Professional Ski Instructors of America
- Ancient Ancestral South Indian, lineage in the genetics of South Asia

== See also ==
- Assi (disambiguation)
