= Al-Biyah =

al-Biyah البيه
- Village
- Location in Syria
- Coordinates: 34°59′3″N 36°41′21″E
- Country: Syria
- Governorate: Hama
- District: Hama
- Subdistrict: Hirbnafsah

Population (2004)
  - Total: 1,703
- Time zone: UTC+3 (AST)
- City Qrya Pcode: C3047

Al-Biyah (Arabic: البيه; also transliterated Albiyya or Albaya) is a Syrian village located in the Hirbnafsah Subdistrict in Hama District. According to the Syria Central Bureau of Statistics (CBS), al-Biyah had a population of 1,803 in the 2024 census. Its inhabitants are predominantly Greek Orthodox Christians.

== History ==
According to 16th-century Ottoman Defter records, Al-Biyah (referred to as Elbiyât) was one of a handful of Christian villages in the Hama Sanjak. Its population rose from 31 households in 1526 to 99 households and 71 bachelors in 1594. It is mentioned by Patriarch Macarius III Ibn al-Za'im (r. 1647–1672) as one of the Christian villages located between Hama and Homs. He noted the village was part of a diocese called 'Euchaita' under Patriarch Michael VI Sabbagh (r. 1576–1581) but that his successor, Patriarch Ibn Ziyada, split Euchaita between Hama and Homs, assigning al-Biyah to the latter, after Euchaita's metropolitan Malachi died. The village continued to be inhabited in the 17th century,

According to an 1828 tax record, al-Biyah was a grain-growing village of 58 feddans. By 1838 it was listed as a khirba (uninhabited ruin).

In 1992 al-Biyah was incorporated into the municipality of Toumin.

== Bibliography ==
- Douwes, Dick (2000). The Ottomans in Syria: A History of Justice and Oppression. I.B. Tauris. ISBN 1860640311.
- Panchenko, Constantin Alexandrovich (2016). Arab Orthodox Christians Under the Ottomans 1516–1831. Holy Trinity Publications.
- Robinson, E.; Smith, E. (1841). Biblical Researches in Palestine, Mount Sinai and Arabia Petraea: A Journal of Travels in the year 1838. Vol. 3. Boston: Crocker & Brewster.
