= Utamysh =

Utamysh Утамыш Оьтемиш
- Selo
- Location within Republic of Dagestan Location within Russia
- Coordinates: 42°24′N 47°45′E
- Country: Russia
- Region: Republic of Dagestan
- District: Kayakentsky District
- Time zone: UTC+3:00

Utamysh (Russian: Утамыш; Kumyk: Оьтемиш, romanized: Ötemiş) is a rural locality (a selo) in Kayakentsky District, Republic of Dagestan, Russia. The population was 3,634 as of 2010. There are 32 streets.

== Geography ==
Utamysh is located 29 km northwest of Novokayakent (the district's administrative centre) by road. Myurego and Novye Mugri are the nearest rural localities.

== Nationalities ==
98.24% of the residents of the settlement were Kumyks.
