= Toumin =

Toumin تومين Toumine
- Village
- Location in Syria
- Coordinates: 34°56′36″N 36°41′36″E
- Country: Syria
- Governorate: Hama
- District: Hama
- Subdistrict: Hirbnafsah

Population (2004)
  - Total: 2,129
- Time zone: UTC+3 (AST)

Toumin (Arabic: تومين, romanized: Tūmīn, also transliterated Toumine) is a village in northwestern Syria, administratively part of the Hama Governorate. It is located 25 kilometers (16 mi) southwest of Hama and lies on the northern bank of the Orontes River, overlooking the city of Rastan. Nearby localities include Deir al-Fardis to the northwest, Kafr Buhum to the north, al-Rastan to the south and Houla to the southwest.

According to the Central Bureau of Statistics (CBS), Toumin had a population of 2,129 in the 2004 census. Its inhabitants are Syriac Catholic and Greek Orthodox Christians.

== History ==
In 1838, Toumin was recorded as a Greek Orthodox Christian village. The village was formerly located at the site of the Rastan Dam, but with the dam's construction in 1960, Toumin was relocated nearby to its present site. In 1992, the Toumin Municipality was established to administer the village and the nearby Christian village of al-Biyah.

== Bibliography ==
- Robinson, E.; Smith, E. (1841). Biblical Researches in Palestine, Mount Sinai and Arabia Petraea: A Journal of Travels in the year 1838. Vol. 3. Boston: Crocker & Brewster.
