= Assi Kalan =

- Village
- Location in Punjab, India Assi Kalan (India)
- Coordinates: 30.7712927°N 75.7941199°E
- Country: Ludhiana India
- State: Punjab
- District: Ludhiana

Government
  - Type: Panchayati raj (India)
  - Body: Gram panchayat

Languages
  - Official: Punjabi
- Time zone: UTC+5:30 (IST)
- Telephone code: 0161
- ISO 3166 code: IN-PB
- Vehicle registration: PB-10
- Website: ludhiana.nic.in

Assi Kalan is a village located in the Ludhiana East tehsil, of Ludhiana district, Punjab. Large number people lived in this village are belong to Jatt community . The village has a govt school, a playground, 3 gurudwara sahib and one agriculture cooprative society.

== Administration ==
The village is administrated by a Sarpanch who is an elected representative of village as per constitution of India and Panchayati raj (India).

Particulars	Total	Male	Female
Total No. of Houses	460		
Population	2,306	1,206	1,100

== Child Sex Ratio details ==
The village population of children with an age group from 0-6 is 219 which makes up 9.50% of total population of village. Average Sex Ratio is 912 per 1000 males which is higher than the state average of 895. The child Sex Ratio as per census is 766, lower than average of 846 in the state of Punjab.

== Cast ==
The village constitutes 16.57% of Schedule Caste and the village doesn't have any Schedule Tribe population.
