= Qubbat al-Kurdi =

Qubbat al-Kurdi قبة الكردي
- Village
- Location in Syria
- Coordinates: 35.010056°N 36.931736°E
- Country: Syria
- Governorate: Hama
- District: Salamiyah
- Subdistrict: Salamiyah

Population (2004)
  - Total: 438
- Time zone: UTC+3 (AST)
- City Qrya Pcode: C3254

Qubbat al-Kurdi (Arabic: قبة الكردي) is a village in central Syria, administratively part of the Salamiyah District, of the Hama Governorate. It is located 30 kilometers (19 mi) east of Hama and 15 kilometers (9.3 mi) west of Salamiyah. According to the Syria Central Bureau of Statistics, Qubbat al-Kurdi had a population of 438 in the 2004 census. Its inhabitants are predominantly Alawites.

Qubbat translates as "Domes", a reference to the mudbrick domes of the huts built by the local settlers who had formerly lived in the surrounding caves. Al-Kurdi refers to Sheikh Ahmad al-Kurdi, a religious figure honored by the local inhabitants and whose maqam (shrine) is visited on religious occasions.
