= Dunaybah =

Dunaybah دنيبة Dneibeh, Danibah
- Village
- Location in Syria
- Coordinates: 34°56′1″N 37°0′6″E
- Country: Syria
- Governorate: Hama
- District: Salamiyah
- Subdistrict: Salamiyah

Population (2004)
  - Total: 2,208
- Time zone: UTC+3 (AST)
- City Qrya Pcode: C3218

Dunaybah (Arabic: دنيبة; also spelled Dneibeh or Danibah) is a Syrian village located in the Salamiyah Subdistrict of the Salamiyah District in Hama Governorate. According to the Syria Central Bureau of Statistics (CBS), Dunaybah had a population of 2,208 in the 2004 census.
