= Taldara =

Taldara تل الدرة Tall al-Dirrah, Tall Derah, Tell Dera, Tell ad-Dura
- Village
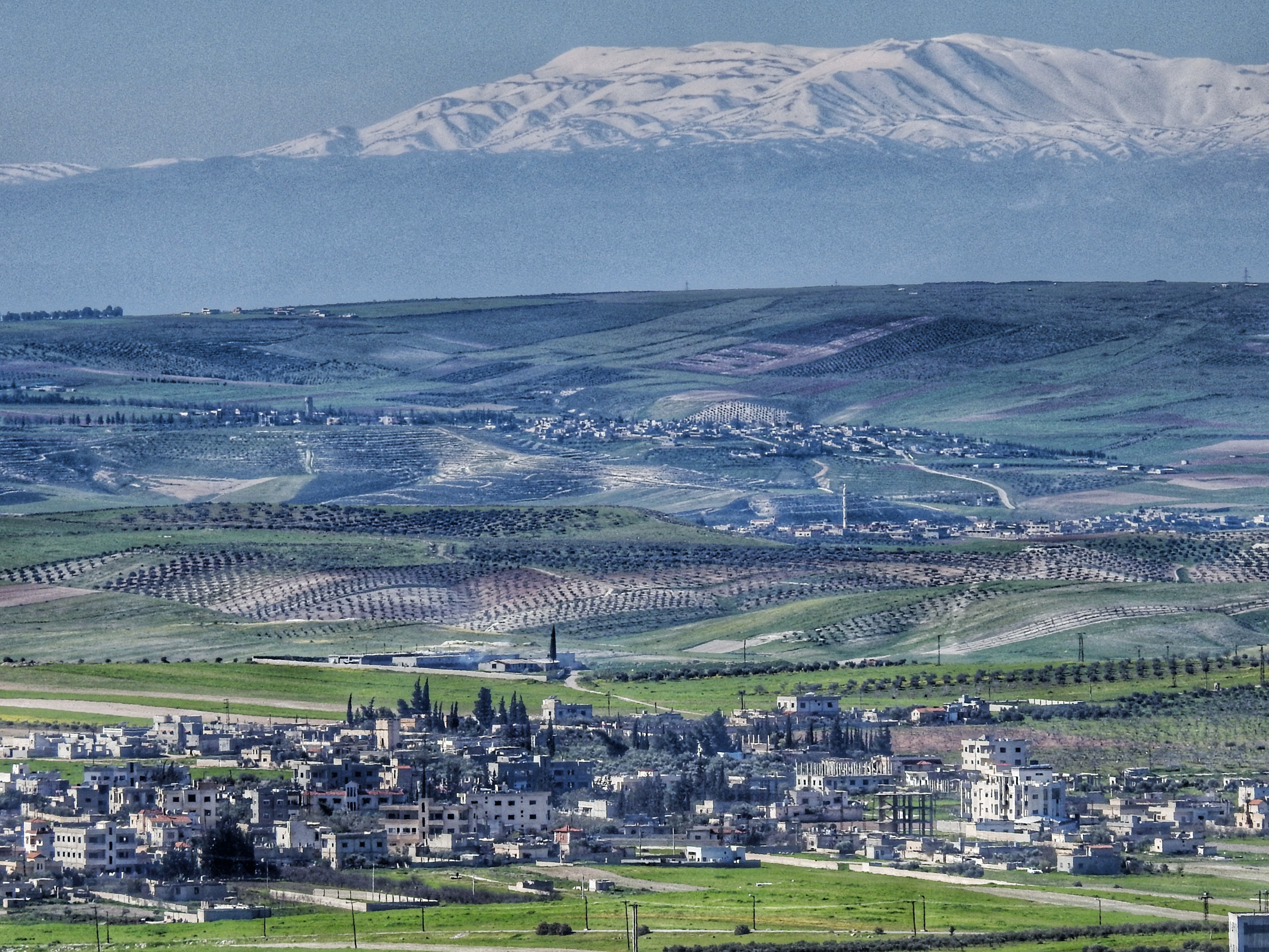
- Skyline of Taldara, 2024

- Location in Syria
- Coordinates: 35°1′51″N 36°56′18″E
- Country: Syria
- Governorate: Hama
- District: Salamiyah
- Subdistrict: Salamiyah

Population (2004 census)
  - Total: 5,986
- Time zone: UTC+3 (AST)
- City Qrya Pcode: C3224

Taldara (Arabic: تل الدرة, also spelled Tell Dirrah, Tall Derah, Talldarra or Tell ad-Dura) is a village in central Syria, administratively part of the Salamiyah District of the Hama Governorate. It is located 23 kilometers (14 mi) southeast of Hama and 12 kilometers (7.5 mi) west of Salamiyah. According to the Syria Central Bureau of Statistics (CBS), Taldara had a population of 5,986 in the 2004 census. Its inhabitants are predominantly Ismailis.

== History ==
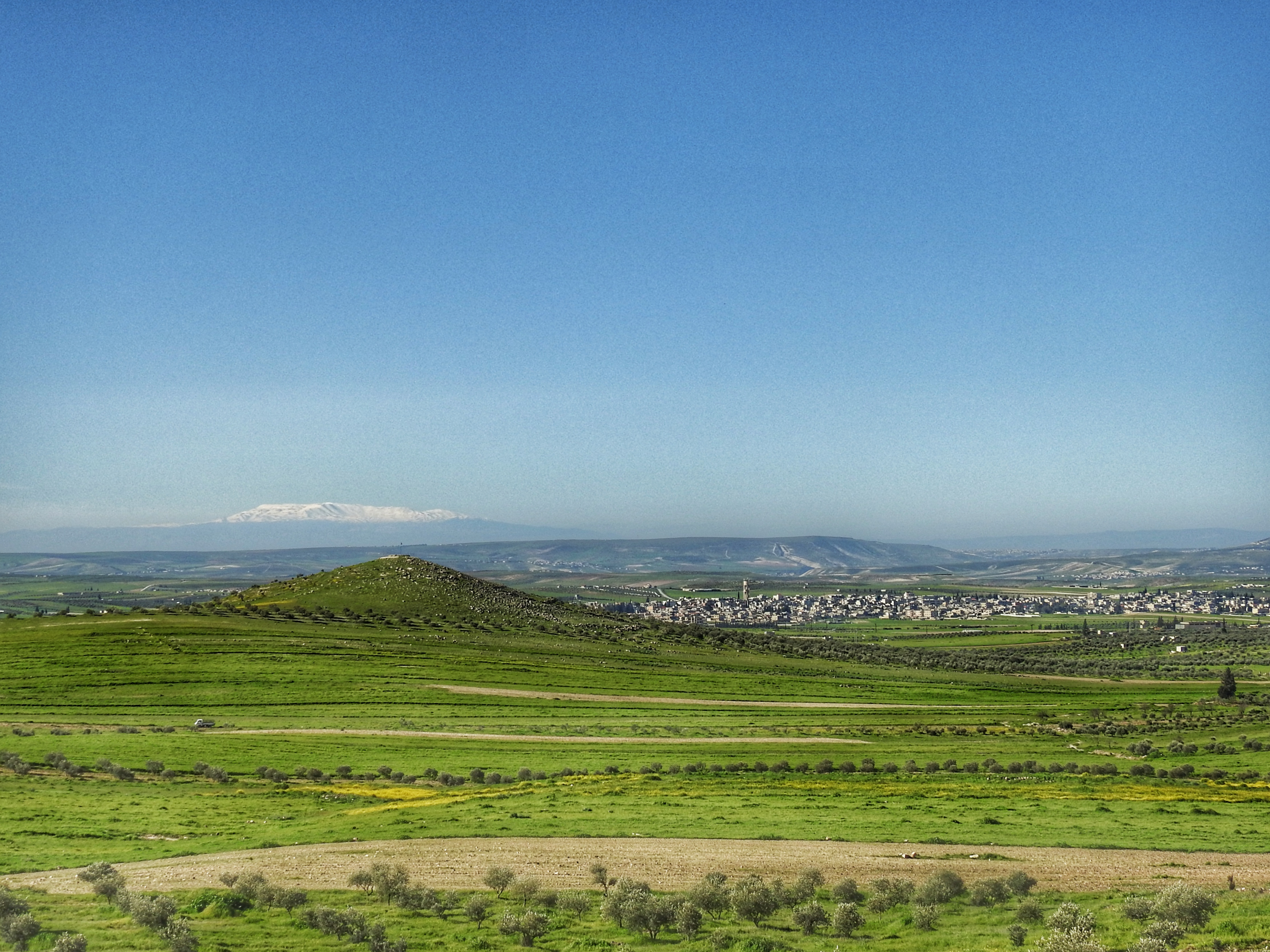
The tell (mound) of Taldara with the modern village behind, 2024

Taldara was initially founded in 1836 when it was acquired by Muhammad Khurfan Bey, a sheikh of the Mawali tribe in the Hama region. Before that, the village had been deserted. Like other places in the Salamiyah area that the Ottoman authorities encouraged to be repopulated, the settlers of Taldara came from the Mawali, Nu'aym and Uqaydat tribes. However, just two years later, Taldara and all of the other villages of Salamiyah were reported to have been deserted.

An attempt to reestablish Taldara in 1876 by Muhammad Qahwaji and Haydar Watad did not succeed due to conflicts with Bedouin tribes from the neighboring al-A'la hill country and the environs of al-Saan, who frequently grazed their sheep flocks at the village site. Watad and Qahwaji planted corn fields on the northern hillside of the tell (archaeological mound) and built two huts nearby, but their venture was ended when Qahwaji was killed by the Bedouins in revenge for his killing of a Bedouin in an earlier quarrel. Qahwaji was buried on top of the tell.

Modern Taldara was re-established in 1883 by Ismaili migrants from other parts of northern Syria led by Ali Sharba from the Khawabi valley, who was later joined by the Askur, Warda and al-Dabiyat families. They chose to settle in the place because of worsening economic conditions in their former areas of residence, the low taxes living in the Syrian Desert fringes offered, and Taldara's proximity to Salamiyah, the center of Ismaili life in Syria.
