= Deir al-Fardis =

Deir al-Fardis دير الفرديس
- Village
- Location in Syria
- Coordinates: 34°58′34″N 36°36′38″E
- Country: Syria
- Governorate: Hama
- District: Hama
- Subdistrict: Hirbnafsah

Population (2004)
  - Total: 5,890
- Time zone: UTC+3 (AST)

Dayr al-Fardis (Arabic: دير الفرديس, romanized: Dayr al-Fureidīs) is a town in northwestern Syria, administratively part of the Hama Governorate, southwest of Hama. Nearby localities include Kafr Buhum to the northeast, Tumin and al-Rastan to the southeast and Houla to the southwest. According to the Central Bureau of Statistics, it had a population of 5,890 in the 2004 census. Its inhabitants are predominantly Sunni Muslims. By the 21st century, about half the villages residents were ethnic Turkmen.

During the Byzantine era, Deir al-Fardis's inhabitants was slow to convert to Christianity, eventually becoming Christian by the 540s. In 1829, during the late Ottoman era, the village was part of the sanjak ("district") of Hama, and consisted of 25 feddans. It paid 2,640 qirsh in taxes to the treasury.

== Bibliography ==
- Douwes, Dick (2000). The Ottomans in Syria: a history of justice and oppression. I.B. Tauris. ISBN 1860640311.
- Robinson, E.; Smith, E. (1841). Biblical Researches in Palestine, Mount Sinai and Arabia Petraea: A Journal of Travels in the year 1838. Vol. 3. Boston: Crocker & Brewster.
- Trombley, Frank R. (2001). Hellenic Religion and Christianization, C. 370-529, Volume 2. BRILL. p. 154. ISBN 9780391041219.
