= Ilham Mahdi al Assi =

Yemeni child-bride

- Born: 1996 or 1997
- Died: 2010
- Known for: Child bride
- Spouse: Abed al-Hikmi

Ilham Mahdi al Assi was a 13-year-old Yemeni girl who died as a result of bleeding following her first sexual intercourse with her husband, 23-year-old Abed al-Hikmi, who was later detained by police. The practice of marrying young girls was condemned by an NGO as "child rape condoned under the guise of marriage."

Yemen has a tribal culture, and the marriage of young girls is common; most Yemeni girls are married before they reach puberty. A proposed law setting a minimum age of 17 for women and 18 for men to marry was opposed by conservative Yemenis, including women.
