= Al-Alamein, Syria =

Al-Alamein العلمين
- Village
- Location in Syria
- Coordinates: 34°57′33″N 36°44′0″E
- Country: Syria
- Governorate: Hama
- District: Hama
- Subdistrict: Hama

Population (2004)
  - Total: 1,081
- Time zone: UTC+3 (AST)
- City Qrya Pcode: C2988

Al-Alamein (Arabic: العلمين) is a Syrian village located in the Hama Subdistrict of the Hama District in Hama Governorate. According to the Syria Central Bureau of Statistics (CBS), al-Alamein had a population of 1,081 in the 2004 census.
