= ASSI =

ASSI may refer to:

- Air Safety Support International, a subsidiary of the British Civil Aviation Authority
- Area of Special Scientific Interest, a conservation designation in the Isle of Man and Northern Ireland
- Australian South Sea Islanders, Melanesian descendants of the victims of blackbirding in Australia.
