= Kissin, Syria =

Kissin كيسين
- Village
- Location in Syria
- Coordinates: 34°52′10″N 36°39′29″E
- Country: Syria
- Governorate: Homs
- District: Rastan
- Subdistrict: Rastan

Population (2004)
  - Total: 2,189
- Time zone: UTC+3 (EET)
  - Summer (DST): UTC+2 (EEST)

Kissin (Arabic: كيسين, romanized: Kīssīn, also spelled Kisein) is a village in northern Syria, administratively part of the Homs Governorate, located north of Homs. According to the Syria Central Bureau of Statistics (CBS), Kissin had a population of 2,189 in the 2004 census. Its inhabitants are predominantly Turkmen Sunni Muslims.
