= Qubaybat al-Assi =

Qubaybat al-Assi قبيبات العاصي
- Village
- Location in Syria
- Coordinates: 34°57′32″N 36°47′8″E
- Country: Syria
- Governorate: Hama
- District: Hama
- Subdistrict: Hama

Population (2004)
  - Total: 1,058
- Time zone: UTC+3 (AST)
- City Qrya Pcode: C3006

Qubaybat al-Assi (Arabic: قبيبات العاصي) is a Syrian village located in the Subdistrict of the Hama District in the Hama Governorate. According to the Syria Central Bureau of Statistics (CBS), Qubaybat al-Assi had a population of 1,058 in the 2004 census.
