= Khunayfis =

Khunayfis خنيفس Khneifis
- Village
- Location in Syria
- Coordinates: 34°57′4″N 36°59′53″E
- Country: Syria
- Governorate: Hama
- District: Salamiyah
- Subdistrict: Salamiyah

Population (2004)
  - Total: 2,570
- Time zone: UTC+3 (AST)
- City Qrya Pcode: C3242

Khunayfis (Arabic: خنيفس) is a Syrian village located in the Salamiyah Subdistrict of the Salamiyah District in Hama Governorate. According to the Syria Central Bureau of Statistics (CBS), Khunayfis had a population of 2,570 in the 2004 census. Its inhabitants are predominantly Alawites.
