= Ghawr al-Assi =

Ghawr al-Assi غور العاصي
- Village
- Location in Syria
- Coordinates: 34°57′19″N 36°46′22″E
- Country: Syria
- Governorate: Hama
- District: Hama
- Subdistrict: Hama

Population (2004)
  - Total: 2,033
- Time zone: UTC+3 (AST)
- City Qrya Pcode: C3010

Ghawr al-Assi (Arabic: غور العاصي) is a Syrian village located in the Hama Subdistrict of the Hama District in the Hama Governorate. It is situated along the road between Homs and Hama, being 20 kilometers south of the latter. According to the Syria Central Bureau of Statistics (CBS), Ghawr al-Assi had a population of 2,033 in the 2004 census. Its inhabitants are predominantly Sunni Muslims.

Ghawr al-Assi is the largest village in the Orontes Valley Municipality, which also includes al-Alamein, Qubaybat al-Assi and smaller hamlets. The municipality was established in 2004. There are archaeological remains in Ghawr al-Assi, including old mills and water wheels (norias).

== Bibliography ==
- Smith, Eli; Robinson, Edward (1841). Biblical Researches in Palestine, Mount Sinai and Arabia Petraea: A Journal of Travels in the Year 1838. Vol. 3. Crocker and Brewster.
