= Karad Dayasinah =

Karad Dayasinah كراد داسنية Shamah
- Village
- Location in Syria
- Coordinates: 34°50′9″N 36°37′15″E
- Country: Syria
- Governorate: Homs
- District: Homs
- Subdistrict: Taldou

Population (2004)
  - Total: 2,028
- Time zone: UTC+3 (AST)

Karad Dayasinah (Arabic: كراد داسنية, also known as Akrad Dayasinah or Akrad Dasnieh, also known as Shamah) is a village in northern Syria, administratively part of the Homs District, located northwest of Homs. According to the Syria Central Bureau of Statistics (CBS), Karad Dayasinah had a population of 2,028 in the 2004 census. Its inhabitants are predominantly Sunni Muslims of Turkmen descent.
