= Talbiseh =

Talbiseh تلبيسة
- Town
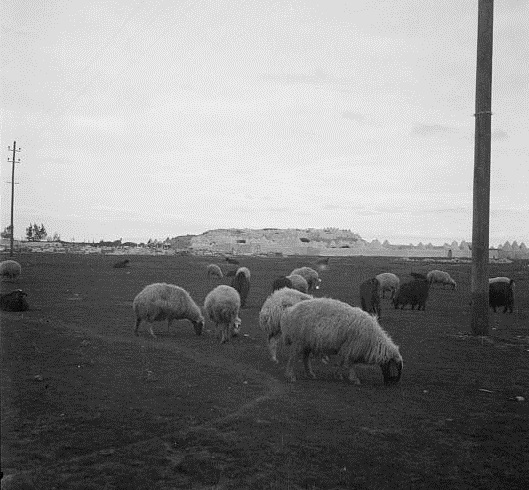
- Talbiseh (background) and sheep grazing (foreground), 1930s

- Location in Syria
- Coordinates: 34°50′0″N 36°44′0″E
- Country: Syria
- Governorate: Homs
- District: Al-Rastan
- Subdistrict: Talbiseh
- Elevation: 455 m (1,493 ft)

Population (2004)
  - Total: 30,796
- Time zone: UTC+2 (EET)
  - Summer (DST): +3

Talbiseh (Arabic: تلبيسة, also spelled Talbisa, Tell Bisa, Talbeesa) is a large town in northwestern Syria administratively part of the Homs Governorate, about 10 kilometers north of Homs. Nearby localities include al-Rastan to the north, al-Ghantoo to the southwest and al-Mashrafah to the east. The old town of Talbiseh is situated on an isolated hill. According to the Central Bureau of Statistics (CBS) Talbiseh had a population of 30,796 in 2004. Its inhabitants are mostly Sunni Muslims.

Talbiseh is located to the north of Homs in Syria on the international road that crosses Syria from north to south. It is the ancient caravan route. Talbiseh is about 10 km from Rastan. The swamps surrounded it on three sides: south, west and north. The caravan route moved away from it to the west by about 200 meters, avoiding the wide swamps. In some rainy years, pools of water formed west of the road in the form of a shallow lake. This meant that the caravans were crossing a narrow road similar to a strait, which tempted thieves and bandits to raid the caravans, rob and plunder them, and flee.This is what prompted some of them to call the hill “Thief Hill” which was completely empty of people.

== History ==
Talbiseh is built atop an ancient tell ("artificial mound"). In 1945 a large hoard of Byzantine Empire-era copper coins were discovered in Talbiseh. The roughly 835 coins, which dated back to 631 CE, consisted of three specimens depicting the emperors Justin II, Phocas and Heraclius Constantine.

Its proximity to important cities that played a distinguished role in the history of ancient Syria leads us to believe that it must have contributed to such a role in one way or another. Assuming that Talbiseh is Abzu, the Ebla archives - as we mentioned - reported that this city witnessed the treaty between the Egyptians and the city of Kadesh. Other than that, the long period between the end of the Hittite tide and the emergence of Christianity is very poor in information. However, this does not mean that Talbiseh was absent from the historical scene. The antiquities found in the citadel and its surroundings confirm that the historical sequence of the city was not interrupted. Assyrian and Aramaic antiquities and writings were found scattered here and there. As for the Greek antiquities, they are abundant and appear clearly in the tombstones. The same is true of the Roman antiquities, which are seen almost everywhere, especially the canals that transported fresh water to many areas, such as the Rastan citadel, which indicates the richness of Talbiseh in water in that era.

Its vast lands were a battlefield in the fierce battles between the armies advancing from the north to seize Homs, and the armies defending it. A battle between the armies of Zenobia and the Romans took place on the plain extending between Homs and Talbiseh in 272 AD. It was as if the vast plains of Talbiseh had turned into battlefields whenever Homs was exposed to danger coming from the north. The Tatar attack was confronted by both Ashraf Musa, the ruler of Homs, and Al-Mansur, the ruler of Hama, in 656 AH (1260 AD) on the Talbiseh plains, and they inflicted a terrible defeat on the Tatars, who were defeated and turned back. These plains were also a favorite place for the leaders of the Islamic conquest armies to reorganize and rehabilitate them to complete the conquest operations.

In Talbiseh, a wall was built around the hill, which was later called Talbiseh Castle. Some attribute the construction of Talbiseh Castle to reasons related to maintaining security and protecting the Hajj caravans heading from the Ottoman lands (currently Turkey) to the Hijaz, as Talbiseh was a Hajj route.These caravans were often exposed to Bedouin raids, and one of these raids led to the killing of the minister Abdul Rahim Al-Azm and his commander in one of the battles with them.The Bedouin raids at that time were a source of concern for the government, spreading chaos and blocking roads, plundering and looting, then fleeing back to their camps in the desert, carrying their spoils with them. For this reason, Talbiseh Castle was built.

=== Ottoman era ===
During the Ottoman era, particularly throughout the 18th-century, Talbiseh served as one of the principal rural fortress towns in northern Syria and it was located along what was known as the "Sultanic Road" which led to Istanbul, the seat of the empire. Its importance had grown as a result of the decline of Maarrat al-Nu'man and Hisyah. The Jundi family had normally provided the aghawat (governors) of the fortress, and would later provide three of Hama's governors around the year 1800. During a revolt by the Mawali tribes of northern Syria, the governor of Talbiseh's fortress, Abd al-Razzaq al-Jundi, was executed by the tribesmen.

Talbiseh was described as a village of mud houses in the mid-19th century. Unlike most Syrian villages at the time whose houses had flat roofs, the mud houses in Talbiseh had dome-shaped roofs. According to traveler Albert Socin, in the early 20th-century, Talbiseh's houses had a cubical base, conical roofs and no windows. The roofs were constructed of overlapping internal layers of stone.

==== Syrian civil war ====
Talbiseh witnessed large demonstrations protesting against the government of Bashar al-Assad in April 2011 as part of the 2011–present Syrian Civil War. Since the beginning of the insurrection, the city has become a stronghold for the opposition and the anti-government Free Syrian Army (FSA). As such, Talbiseh has been targeted by the Syrian Army and security forces throughout the uprising. Between 29 May and early June 2011 Syrian troops backed by tanks entered and besieged the city with the stated aim of rooting out "terrorist groups." Opposition activists claimed troops were raiding houses and arresting suspected dissidents. Five residents and four soldiers were reportedly killed in the first day of the operation.

On 8 June 2012, three civilians and nine Syrian troops were killed in fighting in the Talbiseh area. Heavy fighting between the Syrian Army and the FSA continued until at least 11 June. According to United Nations observers, the FSA took a number of government soldiers captive. The Syrian Army attempted to retake Talbiseh on 21 July, sparking heavy clashes in the city and subsequent artillery bombardment.

On 25 September 2012, France 24 reported that Talbiseh was under siege from all directions by the army. On 24 December 2012, the Talbiseh bakery massacre took place. More than 14 people were killed while queuing for bread at a local bakery, when they were bombed from warplanes of the Syrian government. On 24 March 2014, it was reported that the main obstacle preventing the rebels from breaking the siege of Homs city was the Malouk army complex, just south of Talbiseh. The Malouk complex is composed of many checkpoints, spanning 15 square km. It contains 60 tanks and tens of other military vehicles, in addition to 1200 soldiers. According to a pro-opposition source, on 24 February 2015, an infant was allegedly killed while government forces shelled over the city with mortars from the Engineering battalion in Al-Mesherfe village. In May 2018, the Syrian Arab Army finally entered Talbiseh with Russian support which led to the displacement of hundreds of militant families to the opposition-held areas in northern Syria such as Idlib.

On 13 June 2022, four Syrian Army soldiers, including an officer, were killed in an attack by unidentified gunmen on a Syrian Army checkpoint near the town.

== Bibliography ==
- American Numismatic Society (1955). Numismatic Literature, Issues 26–33. American Numismatic Society.
- Boulanger, Robert (1966). The Middle East, Lebanon, Syria, Jordan, Iraq, Iran. Hachette.
- Douwes, Dick (2000). The Ottomans in Syria: a history of justice and oppression. I.B. Tauris. ISBN 1860640311.
- Hinnebusch, Raymond A. (1990). Authoritarian Power and State Formation in Ba'thist Syria: Army, Party, and Peasant. Westview Press. ISBN 0813375908.
- Pottier, Henri (2004). The Coinage of Syria Under Persian Occupation. CNRS. ISBN 2271061156.
- Socin, Albert (1906). Palestine and Syria with the chief routes through Mesopotamia and Babylonia: Handbook for Travellers. Karl Baedeker. "Birin Hama."
- Walpole, Frederick (1851). The Ansayrii, (or Assassins): With Travels in the Further East, in 1850–51. Including a Visit to Ninevah. R. Bentley. "Tell Bisse Syria."
