= Al-Rastan =

Al-Rastan الرستن
- City
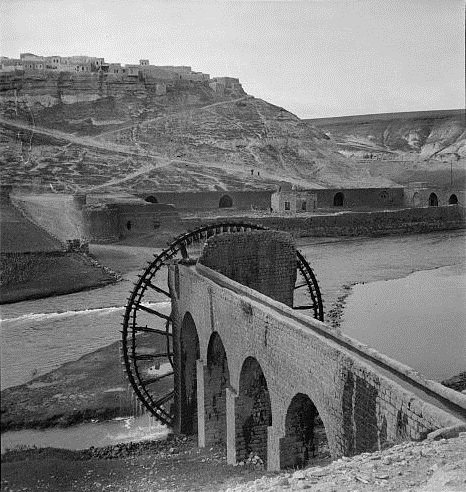
- Ar-Rastan (on hill in background) and waterwheel (forefront) separated by Orontes River, 1930s

- Location in Syria
- Coordinates: 34°55′N 36°44′E
- Country: Syria
- Governorate: Homs
- District: Al-Rastan
- Subdistrict: Al-Rastan
- Elevation: 430 m (1,410 ft)

Population (2004)
  - Total: 39,834
- Time zone: UTC+2 (EET)
  - Summer (DST): +3

Al-Rastan (Arabic: الرستن) is the third largest city in the Homs Governorate, located 25 kilometers (16 mi) north of its administrative capital Homs and 22 kilometers (14 mi) from Hama. Nearby localities include Talbiseh and al-Ghantu to the south, al-Zaafaraniyah and al-Mashrafah to the southeast, Murayj al-Durr to the northeast, Tumin to the north, Deir al-Fardis to the northwest and Kafr Nan and the Houla village cluster to the west. Al-Rastan had a population of nearly 40,000 in 2004.

It occupies the site of the Hellenistic-era city of Arethusa (Ancient Greek: Ἀρέθουσα) and still contains some of its ancient ruins. It continued to exist as a relatively small, but strategic town throughout the early Islamic and Ottoman eras. Al-Rastan is situated adjacently south of the large bridge linking Homs and Hama. The total land area of the town is 350 hectares. It is the site of the al-Rastan Dam, a major dam on the Orontes River that has a retaining capacity of 225 million m^{3}. The dam is principally used for irrigation. The city also contains one of Syria's principal marlstone quarries.

From the start of the Syrian civil war until 2018, Al-Rastan served as a major opposition stronghold and had been the site of much fighting between Syrian Arab Armed Forces and rebels of various factions. The Syrian government retook control of the city on 15 May 2018 as part of an agreement which allowed rebels and their families safe passage to rebel-held parts of northern Syria in exchange for surrendering the territory along with their heavy weapons.

== History ==
=== Classical era ===
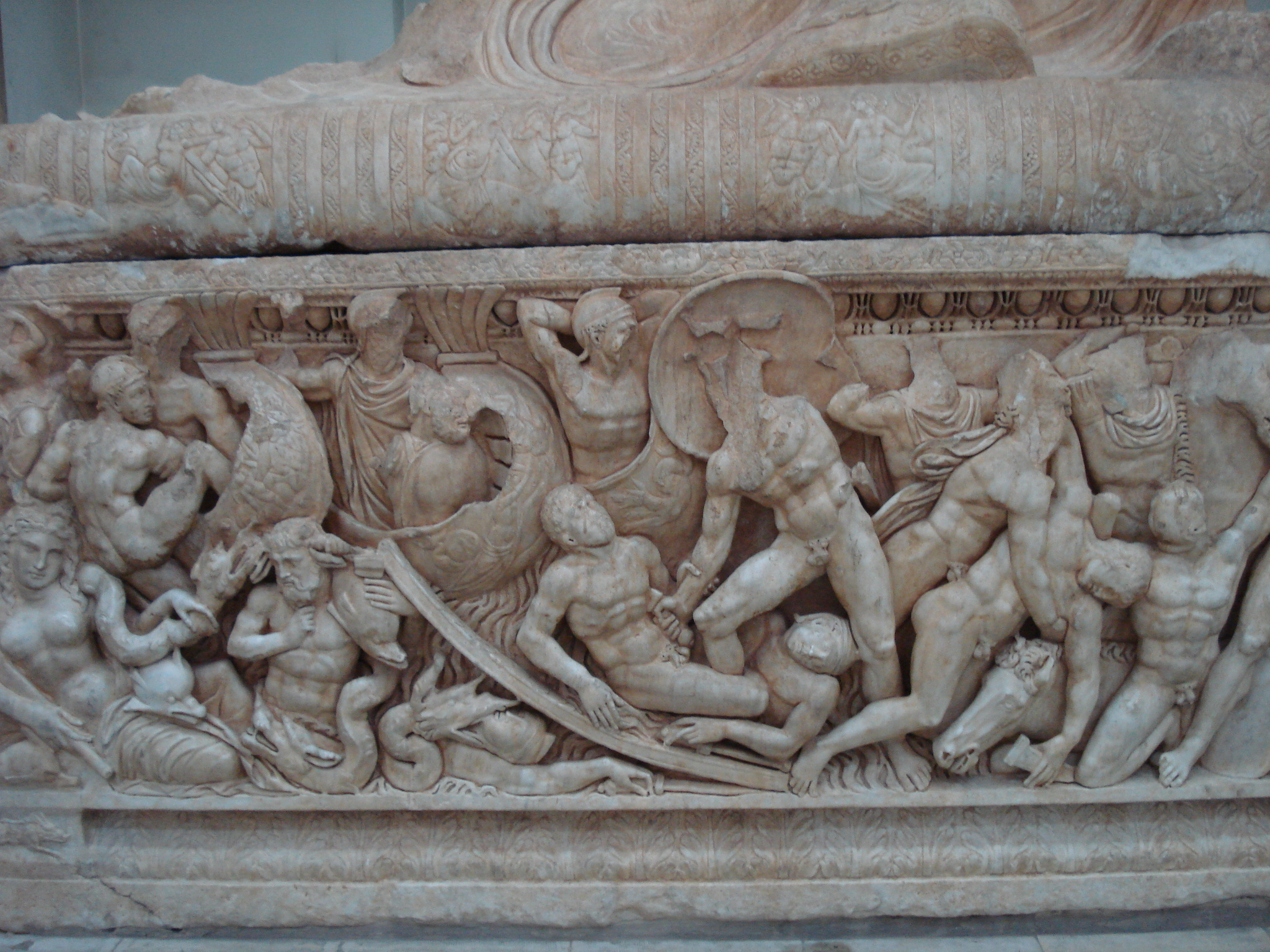
Roman sarcophagus of Arethuse, 3rd century BC, found in the Rastan area, preserved in the National Museum of Damascus

Al-Rastan was built on the site of ancient Arethusa. According to Roman historian Appian, Arethusa was established by Seleucus I Nicator, founder of the Seleucid dynasty in the 3rd century BC. Most sources agree Seleucus named it after the city of Arethusa in Macedonia, but others claim it was named after a spring in Sicily with the same name. Arethusa in native Syriac was called Arastan, also mentioned in the Christian First Council of Nicaea in 325 AD. To a lesser extent, the name "Arastan" continued to be used by the indigenous inhabitants, alongside "Arethusa".

It served as the first capital of the Emesani kingdom in central Syria, a vassal of the Roman Empire, in the mid-1st-century BC. Roman historian Strabo stated that it was well governed under the phylarch Sampsiceramus I from 64 to 63, when the Roman general Pompey captured it. Emesani control was restored by 46 BC when it was ruled by Iamblichus I. During the Roman civil war that followed the death of Julius Caesar, the city's inhabitants sided with Mark Antony against Octavian. Nonetheless, Arethusa became an independent city-state following Octavian's victory in the Battle of Actium in 31 BC, but returned to Emesani control eleven years later. Thereafter, its status declined with the rise of nearby Emesa (modern-day Homs) as a religious and political center. In the 3rd century AD, Roman Emperor Aurelian stayed in the city during his campaign against Zenobia.

=== Byzantine era ===
Arethusa was a Christian bishopric by the beginning of the 4th century. The First Council of Nicaea in 325 counted among its participants a Bishop Eustathius of Arethusa.

In the time of Roman emperor Constantius II (337–361), Bishop Marcus (Mark) of Arethusa was authorized to replace a pagan temple in the city with a Christian church. Under Julian the Apostate (361–363), he was ordered to rebuild the temple. To avoid doing so he fled from the city, but returned to save the Christian people from paying the penalty in his stead, and in 362 underwent very cruel treatment at the hands of the pagan mob, as recounted by Theodoret and Sozomen. He is said to have been the author of the Creed of Sirmium (351) and was counted by Tillemont as an Arian, but research by the Bollandists restored his reputation for orthodoxy and he is now counted as a saint by both the Roman Catholic and Eastern Orthodox Church.

By a subdivision of the Roman province of Coele-Syria after c. 415, Arethusa became part of the new province of Syria Secunda or Syria Salutaris, with capital at Apamea on the Orontes (modern-day Qalaat al-Madiq). The episcopal see of Arethusa thus became a suffragan of the metropolitan see of Apamea rather than of Antioch.

Other bishops of Arethusa whose names are known are: a second Mark, who took part in the Council of Chalcedon in 451; Eusebius, one of the signatories of the letter that the bishops of Syria Secunda wrote to Emperor Leo I the Thracian after the killing of Patriarch Proterius of Alexandria; Severianus at the start of the 6th century; and Abraamius, who ordained the priest Constantinus of Apamea, accused of Monothelism at the Third Council of Constantinople (680–681).

Lebanese sources such as Giuseppe Simone Assemani and Bishop Yusef al-Dibs claim that Maron, the patron saint of the Maronite Church, who died in 410, was buried in Arethusa. Most Maronite sources also believe the Monastery of Maron was located in the city as well.

In the Crusades period, Arethusa (which was called Artasia) was for a short time a Latin Rite see, of which two bishops are known, mentioned respectively in 1100 and 1135. Since Arethusa is no longer a residential bishopric, it is today listed by the Catholic Church as a titular see for both the Latin Church and the Syriac Catholic Church.

=== Islamic era ===
According to early Muslim geographers, Al-Rastan, despite its strong fortifications and large garrison was swiftly captured then destroyed by Abu Ubaida's forces during the Muslim conquest of Syria in 634, while Umar ibn al-Khattab was caliph. In early 945 the Aleppo-based Hamdanids under the leadership of Sayf al-Dawla decisively defeated the Ikhshidid army led by Abu al-Misk Kafur at Al-Rastan from which they proceeded to conquer Damascus. According to one account, about 4,000 Ikshidid soldiers were taken captive in addition to hundreds killed in action or drowned in the Orontes River.

In 1115 while Artukid ruler Ilghazi was resting at Al-Rastan on his way north to Diyarbakır, Khir Khan ibn Qaraja, the Seljuk ruler of Homs, attacked his camp and briefly had him imprisoned. Following Saladin's arrival at Al-Rastan in February 1175, the Crusaders under Raymond of Tripoli withdrew from their siege of Homs which was then captured by Saladin, bringing most of Syria under Ayyubid rule. In 1226, during Ayyubid rule, Syrian geographer Yaqut al-Hamawi visited Al-Rastan and wrote that it was "a small and ancient town ... It is now a ruin, but the remains still show what was its former splendor."

The Mamluks gained control over Syria in the 1260s, and organized the region into kingdoms subordinate to the sultanate in Cairo. Al-Rastan became the southernmost town of Mamlakat Hama ("Kingdom of Hama") near the border with Mamlakat Hims. In a major battle at a place between the town and Homs, the Mamluks under Qalawun decisively defeated the invading Mongol army of the Ilkhanate in 1281. Later, in the early 14th century, Abu'l-Fida noted that in Al-Rastan, "Each of the houses is so large as to be almost like a village, with ruins everywhere round of buildings and walls." He further noted that a few arches, gates, parts of the city wall and its water channel were still present.

In the late 16th-century or early 17th-century, during Ottoman rule, the caravanserai Khan Al-Rastan was built just outside the town. Abd al-Ghani al-Nabulsi, the 17th-century Sufi sheikh, visited the false tomb of Persian Sufi mystic Abu Yazid al-Bistami at Al-Rastan (the actual one is in Bistam) in 1678, writing "over his grave there is splendor and awe, asserting his presence there." Khan al-Rastan was visited in 1745 by Edward Pococke who described it as a "huge fortified caravanserai" that was decaying rapidly.

=== Modern era ===
At the beginning of the 19th-century, Al-Rastan was an impoverished village whose population engaged primarily in husbandry. It occupied the northernmost part of Arethusa's ruins. Like Homs during this period, its houses were built of black trapp. They were described as small, ramshackle dwellings with mud roofs supported by wooden beams. A few buildings dating from the Mamluk era contained arches with the ablaq architectural style.

During the Franco-Syrian War, Al-Rastan served as one of the bases for Saleh al-Ali and his local allies and was shelled by French forces in early 1920. Two Sunni Muslim agricultural clans, the Firzat and the Hamdan, dominated Al-Rastan in the 19th and early 20th centuries. The former claimed descent from the Banu 'Abs tribe that arrived in Syria as part of Khalid ibn al-Walid's army in the mid-7th century. A member, Sheikh Abd al-Qader, served as Al-Rastan's mukhtar in the late Ottoman and French Mandate periods.

Abd al-Qader was the father of Mustafa Tlass who would become Defense Minister under Hafez al-Assad in 1972. The Hamdan had greater influence in the city and politically identified itself with the Nasserist trend which gained mass appeal in the Arab world in the 1950s–60s.

On 23 March 1961, the Bulgarian Techno-Impex company completed the Rastan Dam while Syria was part of the United Arab Republic with Egypt. The dam is currently the third largest in the country.

=== Syrian civil war ===
Al-Rastan was one of the first cities to participate in the Syrian uprising against the government of Bashar al-Assad that would lead to the ongoing Syrian civil war. In mid-April 2011 large anti-government demonstrations began taking place in Al-Rastan as well as nearby Talbiseh. On 28 April about 50 local Ba'ath Party officials resigned from the organization in protest of the government and opposition activists claimed 17 demonstrators were killed by security forces. On 29 May, the Syrian Army launched an assault, led by Hafez Makhlouf, on the city which lasted through most of the first week of June. By 2 June local activists claimed at least 52 civilians were killed, while the government stated four of its soldiers were killed in the offensive.

By August 2011, Al-Rastan was mostly in the hands of the opposition Free Syrian Army (FSA) which was made up of defectors from the Syrian Arab Army and civilian volunteers. According to Al Jazeera, "Many defectors from the army come from Rastan." The unit based in the city called themselves the Khalid ibn al-Walid Battalion. That month saw the FSA target local government figures and sympathizers, and pro-government Shabiha militiamen attack opposition-held neighborhoods. In late September the Syrian Army, reportedly backed by tanks and helicopters, launched an operation to retake the city resulting in four days of fighting. The Syrian Army succeeded and the FSA withdrew.

Opposition militants regained control of the city by January 2012 reigniting continuous clashes between them and the security forces which started late that month. On 31 January ten activists and their relatives were killed in Al-Rastan after their building collapsed from Syrian Army fire. On 6 February a local FSA unit commander Ala'a al-Sheikh reported that at least 42 people were killed by the Syrian Army in the preceding three days. By 4 March the FSA had managed to repel the Syrian Army, although many of their fighters retreated "for tactical reasons" according to their local commander. Army shelling reportedly killed three people that day. On 14 May, opposition sources claimed that nine people were killed as a result of Syrian Army shelling, while 23 soldiers were killed after the FSA attacked Syrian Army armored carriers approaching the city. An FSA member stated that Al-Rastan "has been destroyed." In September 2015, the Syrian Observatory for Human Rights claimed that ISIS killed seven men in the town, accusing them of being homosexual. In the northside of the city, the al-Bassel National Hospital is a major army base for government troops and is often the target of rebel shelling.

On 16 May 2018, the Syrian government established control over city after the last rebels were transported to the Idlib Governorate.

During the offensive of December 2024, it was reported that a bridge in Rastan was bombed by Russian forces to impede the rebel advance.

== Demographics ==
In 1970 Al-Rastan's population was 7,509. It had a population of 39,834 in 2004 according to the census by the Central Bureau of Statistics of Syria (CBS). There were a total of 6,066 households. Reuters news agency put the city's population in 2011–2012 as roughly 60,000. The inhabitants are mostly Sunni Muslims.

== Bibliography ==
- Ajami, Fouad (2012). The Syrian Rebellion. Hoover Press. ISBN 978-0817915063.
- Amitai-Preiss, Reuven (2005). Mongols and Mamluks: The Mamluk-Īlkhānid War, 1260–1281. Cambridge University Press. ISBN 0521522900.
- Batatu, Hanna (1999). Syria's Peasantry, the Descendants of Its Lesser Rural Notables, and Their Politics. Princeton University Press. ISBN 0691002541.
- Bey, Ali (1816). Travels of Ali Bey : in Morocco, Tripoli, Cyprus, Egypt, Arabia, Syria, and Turkey, Between the Years 1803 and 1807. Vol. 2. Longman, Hurst, Rees, Orme, and Brown.
- Breasted, James Henry (1927). A History of Egypt from the Earliest Times to the Persian Conquest. Ardent Media.
- Burton, Sir Richard Francis (1872). Unexplored Syria: Visits to the Libanus, the Tulúl el Safá, the Anti-Libanus, the Northern Libanus, and the 'Aláh. Vol. 1. Tinsley Brothers.
- Butcher, Kevin (2003). Roman Syria and the Near East. Getty Publications. ISBN 0892367156.
- Britannica Educational Publishing (2011). Laura S. Etheredge (ed.). Syria, Lebanon, and Jordan. The Rosen Publishing Group. ISBN 978-1615304141.
- Coleridge, Samuel Taylor (1845). Encyclopaedia Metropolitana or Universal Dictionary of Knowledge. B. Fellowes.
- Cohen, Getzel M. (2006). The Hellenistic Settlements in Syria, the Red Sea Basin, And North Africa. University of California Press. ISBN 0520241487.
- Grube, Ernst J. (1978). Architecture of the Islamic world: its history and social meaning, with a complete survey of key monuments. Morrow. ISBN 9780688033248.
- Houtsma, M. H. (1987). E.J. Brill's First Encyclopaedia of Islam. BRILL. ISBN 9004082654.
- Ibn al-Athir, Izz al-Din (2007). Donald Sidney Richards (ed.). The Chronicle of Ibn Al-Athīr for the Crusading Period from Al-Kāmil Fīʼl-taʼrīkh: The years 541–589. Ashgate Publishing, Ltd. ISBN 978-0754640783.
- Levick, Barbara (2007). Julia Domna, Syrian Empress. Taylor & Francis. ISBN 978-0415331432.
- Moosa, Matti (1987). Extremist Shiites: The Ghulat Sects. Syracuse University Press. ISBN 0815624115.
- Moosa, Matti (2005). The Maronites in History. Gorgias Press LLC. ISBN 1593331827.
- Oron, Yitzhak (1962). Middle East Record, 1961. Vol. 2. The Moshe Dayan Center.
- Sirriyeh, Elizabeth (2005). Sufi Visionary of Ottoman Damascus: ʻAbd Al-Ghanī Al-Nābulusī, 1641–1731. Psychology Press. ISBN 0415341655.
- le Strange, Guy (1890), Palestine Under the Moslems: A Description of Syria and the Holy Land from A.D. 650 to 1500, Committee of the Palestine Exploration Fund
- United States. Office of International Health. Division of Planning and Evaluation (1977). Syncrisis: The Dynamics of Health, Issues 21–24. Office of International Health, Division of Planning and Evaluation; For Sale by the Supt. of Docs., U. S. Govt. Print. Office.
- Walpole, Frederick (1851). The Ansayrii, (or Assassins,): With Travels in the Further East, in 1850–51. Including a Visit to Ninevah. R. Bentley. "Telbisse Rastan."
- Ziadeh, Nicole A. (1953). Urban Life in Syria Under the Early Mamluks. Greenwood Press. ISBN 9780837131627.
