= Al-Rastan District =

Ar-Rastan District منطقة الرستن
- District
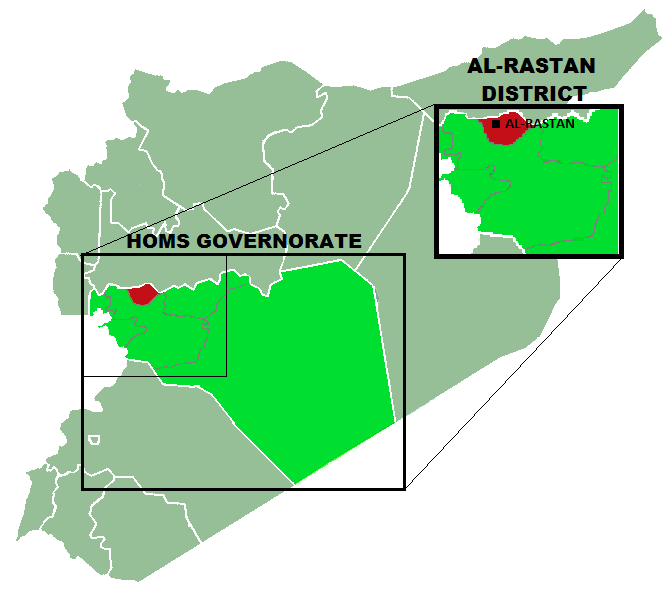
- Map of Ar-Rastan District within Homs Governorate
- Coordinates (Ar-Rastan): 34.92°N 36.73°E
- Country: Syria
- Governorate: Homs
- Control: Syrian transitional government
- Seat: Ar-Rastan
- Subdistricts: 2 nawāḥī

Area
  - Total: 290.72 km^{2} (112.25 sq mi)

Population (2004)
  - Total: 128,055
  - Density: 440.48/km^{2} (1,140.8/sq mi)
- Geocode: SY0404

Ar-Rastan District (Arabic: منطقة الرستن, romanized: manṭiqat Ar-Rastan) is a district (manṭiqat) of the Homs Governorate, Syria. According to the 2004 census, the district had a population of 128,055. The district is divided into two sub-districts (nawāḥī).

== History ==
Ar-Rastan occupies the site of the ancient city of Arethusa. According to historian Appian, Arethusa was founded by Seleucus I Nicator, the founder of the Seleucid Empire. During the revolt of Quintus Caecilius Bassus between 46 and 44 BC, Arethusa was controlled by Sampsiceramus of the Emesene dynasty, and his son Iamblichus.

During the rule of Hafez al-Assad, senior government officers and members of influential families in Ar-Rastan helped maintain government control over the city. However, when Bashar al-Assad took over the presidency, outsiders took over these positions. This weakened government control over the region during the 2011 Syrian revolution against the government. On 25 May 2011, the Syrian government forces besieged Ar-Rastan while the residents fled the town. According to a report by United Nations, the conflict resulted in several civilian deaths. In 2012, opposition groups took control of the region with the help of the locals. In May 2018, after the region was recaptured by the government forces, a reconciliation agreement was reached through a Russian initiative and the local Families Council helped with the governance.

== Geography ==
Ar-Rastan District is one of the six administrative districts (manṭiqat) of Homs Governorate, Syria. Ar-Rastan, is located approximately 22 km (14 mi) north of Homs. The district of Ar-Rastan is divided into two sub-districts (nawāḥī)–Al-Rastan (ناحية الرستن) and Talbiseh (ناحية تلبيسة).

== Demographics ==
According to the 2004 census, the district had a population of 128,055, comprising 65,993 males and 62,062 females. The census recorded 18,985 households, with an average household size of 6.8 people. The illiteracy rate was 7.5% among males and 21.3% among females. About 58.8% of the population were recorded as engaged in paid work, 21.8% were self-employed and 12.6% worked without pay. Approximately 85.1% of the households were recorded as own houses.

In 2004, Al-Rastan sub-district had 64,271 inhabitants and Talbiseh had 63,784 inhabitants. According to the United Nations Office for the Coordination of Humanitarian Affairs (OCHA), the population was estimated in 2021 as 62,563 in Al-Rastan sub-district and 93,053 in Talbiseh. The OCHA estimated the population to be 63,416 in Al-Rastan sub-district and a population of 95,415 in Talbiseh with 500 and 2,925 internally displaced people respectively in 2024.

== Economy ==
The Syrian Civil War caused extensive damage to the irrigation infrastructure in the region. In 2020, a European Union-funded programme was implemented by the Food and Agriculture Organization to rehabilitate the irrigation network. The project restored irrigation water to approximately 11,000 ha (27,000 acres) of agricultural land across 20 villages. Summer crops grown in Al-Rastan include sunflower, maize, sesame, and vegetables and winter crops include wheat, barley, and legumes.
