= Hama offensive (March–April 2017) =

Military offensive

- Part of the Syrian Civil War and the Russian military intervention in the Syrian Civil War
- Map of the offensive actions, as of 21 April 2017
| Date | 21 March – 28 April 2017 (1 month and 1 week) |
| Location | Northern Hama Governorate, Syria |
| Status | Syrian Army and allies victory: The rebels captured about 40 positions, including at least 11 villages and towns, coming within 3 km of Hama city; The Syrian Army recaptured all lost territory, as well as ones lost in the previous offensive including the cities of Taybat al-Imam and Halfaya |

Belligerents
| Hay'at Tahrir al-Sham (Syrian opposition) Free Syrian Army; Ajnad al-Sham; Turkistan Islamic Party in Syria; Ajnad al-Kavkaz; Katibat al Ghuraba al Turkistan Ahrar al-Sham (Syrian opposition) Free Syrian Army | (Syria) Syrian Government; Iran; Russia; Allied militias: Hezbollah; Iraqi Shia militias Ba'ath Brigades; Liwa Zainebiyoun; Liwa Fatemiyoun; SSNP |

Commanders and leaders
| Abu Mohammad al-Julani (Hay'at Tahrir al-Sham commander) (Syrian opposition) Capt. Abu Taleb al-Hasan (Army of Victory commander) (Syrian opposition) Abu Mahmoud (Army of Victory commander) (Syrian opposition) Col. Mustafa Bakeware (Free Idlib Army senior commander) (Syrian opposition) Col. Abdul Hamid Zakaria (Free Idlib Army commander); Killed: Abu Ahed † (Hay'at Tahrir al-Sham commander); Abu Al-Fateh † (Hay'at Tahrir al-Sham commander); Muhammad Al-Taayshi † (Hay'at Tahrir al-Sham elite forces commander); Ali Ahmad Al-Abboud † (Ajnad al-Sham commander) (Syrian opposition) Abd Al-Hameed Al-Hudairy † (Army of Victory commander) (Syrian opposition) Jumaa Al-Khaled † (Army of Glory commander) (Syrian opposition) Saher Saleh † (Army of Glory senior commander) (Syrian opposition) Mohammed Jallad † (Army of Glory senior commander) (Free Idlib Army commander) (Syrian opposition) Ameen al-Biori † (Free Idlib Army top commander) (Syrian opposition) Ahmad Al-Rammah abu Ibrahim † (Commander-in-chief of the Central Division) | (Syria) Suhayl al-Hasan (Tiger Forces commander) (Syria) Juma al-Jassim (Syrian Army artillery and missile department director); Qasem Soleimani (Quds Force chief commander); Killed: (Syria) Hossam Ahmed Asaad † (Syrian Army commander) (Syria) Haidar Saleh † (Syrian Army commander) (Syria) Unnamed Syrian Army lieutenant colonel † (Iran) Saeed Khajeh Salehani † (IRGC field commander) (Iran) Hossein Moez-Qolami † (IRGC field commander); Saqib Haider Karbalai † (Liwa Zainebiyoun commander) |

Units involved
| Hay'at Tahrir al-Sham; Special forces; Inghimasi unit; Organization of Muhajiri of Ahl al-Sunnah in Iran; (Syrian opposition) Free Syrian Army; Jaysh al-Izza; (Syrian opposition) Jaysh al-Nasr; (Syrian opposition) Free Idlib Army; (Syrian opposition) Authenticity and Development Front; (Syrian opposition) Jaysh al-Nukhba; Elite Division; (Syrian opposition) Central Division; (Syrian opposition) Sons of the Levant; 23rd Division; (Syrian opposition) Martyrs of Islam Brigade | Syrian Armed Forces; Syrian Army; 11th Armored Division; 47th Brigade; 87th Brigade; Tiger Forces; 5th Corps; Suqur al-Sahara; Qalamoun Shield Forces; National Defence Forces; Local militias: Elite Soldiers of Sallah Assi, Leopards of Idlib, Tigers of Qamahana; Golan Regiment; Assad ash-Sharq; Air Force Intelligence Directorate; Guardians of the Dawn; Syrian Air Force; (Iran) Iranian Armed Forces; IRGC; Basij; Quds Force; Russian Armed Forces; Russian Air Force; Russian Ground Forces; Special operations forces; Syrian Hezbollah; Al-Ghalibun; Iraqi Shia militias; Harakat Hezbollah al-Nujaba; LAAG |

Strength
| 6,000–10,000+ fighters: 600 TFSA fighters | 12,000–15,000+ soldiers including Allied militias and support elements: SSNP: c. 1,000+ |

Casualties and losses
| 250 killed and 750 wounded (per the rebels); 2,400 killed (per SAA) | 259 reported killed, estimates up to 427 58+ foreign fighters killed(8 IRGC, 1 Russian) |
- Several hundreds killed and captured

The Hama offensive (March–April 2017) was a military offensive launched by Syrian rebel groups led by Hay'at Tahrir al-Sham (HTS) north of the city of Hama, as part of the Syrian Civil War. The offensive began on 21 March 2017, and the rebels aimed to recapture areas recaptured by the Syrian Armed Forces in the 2016 Hama offensive, as well as pushing into Hama city. The offensive was coordinated with rebel forces in Damascus' eastern suburbs, who launched their own operation in March 2017. Though the rebels had some initial success, reaching the outskirts of Hama, these gains were stopped and eventually reversed by Syrian government counter-attacks, which by the end of April had recaptured all of the territory lost the previous month.

== The offensive ==
=== Tahrir al-Sham-led offensive south and east of Halfaya ===
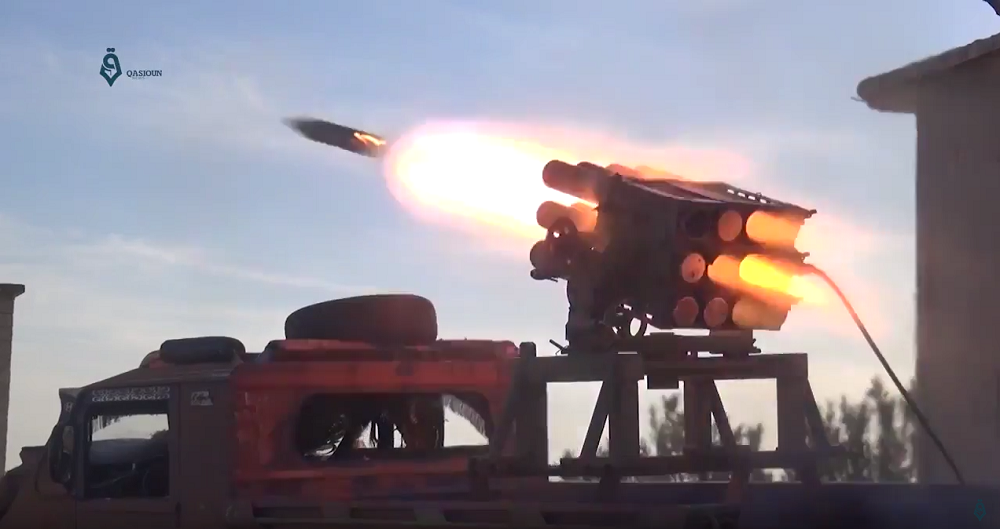
Rebel rocket artillery bombards government positions during the offensive.

On 21 March 2017, the rebel offensive code-named the "Battle of Tell Them to Work" was launched when two Tahrir al-Sham suicide bombers detonated two large car bombs against government positions in the town of Suran. Rebel forces led by Tahrir al-Sham then proceeded to attack Suran and the nearby villages of Maardis and Ma'an. The rebels captured the three villages by 22 March, but this was denied by Hezbollah. The pro-opposition activist group the SOHR confirmed the rebel capture of Suran and parts of Maardis. The village of Khitab was also captured. According to an SAA Tiger Force commander, there were about 6,000 HTS and allied militants involved in the offensive. In response to the rebel offensive, the Syrian Army sent reinforcements to the northern Hama frontline. The rebels aimed to capture Jabal Zayn al-Abidin and attack the Hama Military Airport, and reportedly advanced to within 7 kilometers of Hama city.

On 23 March, rebels captured the villages of Kawkab and Iskandariyah, stormed Maardis, and cut off the road linking Mahardah to Hama. The advances that day brought HTS-led forces within 5 kilometers of Hama city. Pro-government al-Masdar News claimed that the rebels carried out a massacre of Alawites in the village of al-Majdal, killing up to 30 of them. According to an opposition source, Sham FM radio reported that this was denied by Mohaled Hazzouri, the governor of Hama. Later that day, the Syrian Army recaptured Kawkab. Al-Masdar News also reported that Khattab and one other village were recaptured amid an ongoing counter-offensive.

=== Syrian Army repels Ahrar al-Sham-led offensive on Kernaz ===
On 24 March, six rebel factions led by Ahrar al-Sham launched a separate offensive, code-named the "Echo of the Levant", on the northwestern front of Hama, with the goal to surround and capture Karnaz. However, after managing to initially capture three villages, the rebels were forced to retreat due to heavy artillery shelling.

=== Rebel attack on Qomhana and Syrian Army advance near Mahardah ===
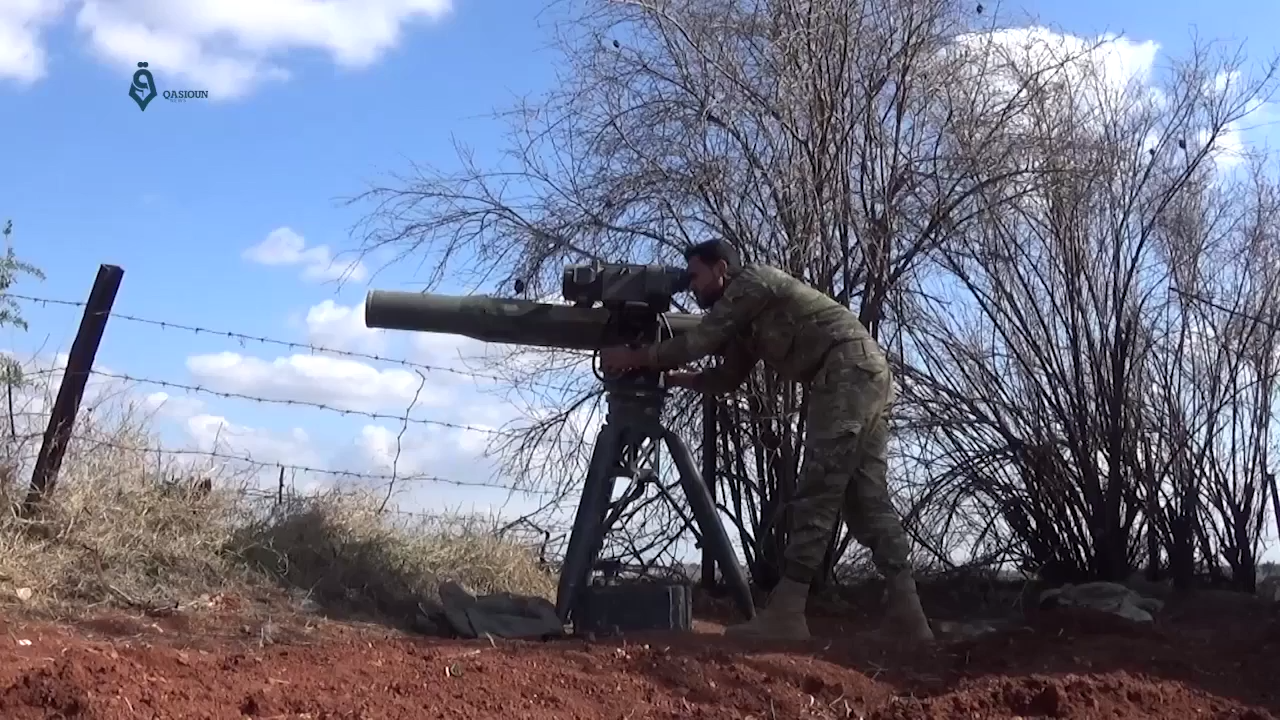
An Army of Glory fighter launches a BGM-71 TOW anti-tank missile at government positions during the offensive.

On 24 March, the rebels attacked the town of Qomhana, north of Hama. Following an attack by three suicide car-bombers, the rebels managed to penetrate the town's defenses and heavy fighting ensued inside it. However, the rebel attack was eventually repelled after the Army encircled the rebels inside Qomhana and cleared them out. The same day, the Syrian Army recaptured the village of Shayzar, near Mahardah.

On 25 March, on the Maarzaf front, fighters of the Army of Glory used a BGM-71 TOW missile against a group of Syrian Army soldiers, scoring a direct hit. They claimed to have killed over 150 soldiers; however, sources on the ground gave a count of between 14 and 20 casualties. Elsewhere, the rebels started a new attack on Qomhana, which also involved a suicide bombing. Kawkab was once again captured by the rebels for several hours, before the Army retook it once again, as well as Tall al Abadi hill south of Maardes.

On 26 March, after a new morning rebel attack was repelled on Qomhana's western flank, the HTS rebels withdrew their forces to the cemetery area outside the town. The Syrian Army then attacked the cemetery area, overrunning HTS positions that afternoon. Subsequently, the Army captured the nearby hilltop of Tal Al-Sammam and its three checkpoints. They then started preparing to enter Khitab, which was reportedly empty but still not safe due to the large presence of rebels around the village. In the evening, HTS-led forces launched another three-hour rebel assault on Qomhana. Despite the rebels initially managing to penetrate the Syrian Army's first defense line on the town's northern flank, Army reinforcements from the east and the west reportedly managed to besiege the rebel forces in Qomhana's north, killing a large number of them, and forcing the rest to retreat.

On 27 March, the Army recaptured a village south of Mahardah. The military also reportedly seized the Mahardah bridge, reaching the outskirts of the village of Arzeh.

=== Second Ahrar al-Sham-led attack repelled ===
On 28 March, the rebels launched a new assault on two flanks north of Mahardah, capturing the Al-Qaramitah area. They also seized Tall Al-Sakhr hill, Al-Sakhir village and the nearby grain silos near Kernaz. However, the attack was eventually repelled later in the day, as the Syrian Army regained all the lost positions at Al-Qaramitah and Sakhir. Three Syrian Army tanks were destroyed or damaged by BGM-71 TOW anti-tank missiles during the day's fighting.

=== Syrian Army counterattack and rebels pushed back ===
On 29 March, HTS-led forces captured Tal Shihah hill, south of Khitab, bringing HTS-led jihadists within 3 kilometers of Hama city. Concurrently, the Army counter-attacked north of Qomhana and recaptured several positions, including Saman hill. Later in the day, the military also recaptured Tal Shihah. Subsequently, the Syrian army captured the strategic hilltop of Tal Bizam, north of Suran. The next day, the Syrian Army captured six locations, including the town of Arzah and Point 50, to the south west of Qomhana and south of Khitab. Meanwhile, another rebel attack on the northwestern front was repelled. On 30 March, a government airstrike hit al-Lataminah. More than 70 people in the area were then exposed to an unidentified chemical agent and showed symptoms of nausea, agitation, foaming, muscle spasm, and miosis (constriction of the pupil of the eye); cardiac arrest occurred in two of the victims and an orthopedic doctor died.

On 31 March, the Syrian army recaptured Khitab and five other villages along with several hills and checkpoints. They also reopened the Hama-Mhardheh highway and pushed back the rebels to positions 11 kilometers from Hama Military Airport.

=== Back-and-forth fighting and the Syrian Army reaches Suran ===
On 3 April, the Syrian Army recaptured the town of Maardis, along with the nearby silos and hills. Subsequently, they shifted their assault and reclaimed the village of Iskanderiyah and Maardis bridge. A government aircraft was reported to carry out a chlorine gas attack on Al-Habit, injuring dozens and killing two children. The next day, the rebels counter-attacked against Maardis and recaptured it after more than nine hours of heavy fighting. The initial rebel assault involved three suicide car-bombers, according to pro-government sources. The town of Khan Shaykoun was reported to have been struck by an airstrike by government forces followed by massive civilian chemical poisoning. The release of a toxic gas, which included sarin, or a similar substance, killed at least 89 people and injured more than 541, according to the opposition Idlib Health Directorate. The attack was the deadliest use of chemical weapons in the Syrian civil war since the Ghouta chemical attack in 2013.

On 5 April, Maardis was once again contested, although by the afternoon the rebels managed to push back government forces and retain control of the town. Subsequently, a rebel suicide car-bomber attacked the government-held hill of Tall Abadah, 1,500 meters southeast of Maardis, reportedly immobilizing a tank. At the same time, the Army captured a checkpoint near Halfaya and managed to penetrate the town from the west. However, the rebels regained the lost ground at Halfaya later in the day, while also recapturing Iskandariyah.

On 7 April, around noon, the rebels advanced and captured several positions south of Maardis. However, this turned out to be a trap set up by the Army with dozens of rebel reported killed. After several hours of clashes, the military recaptured the positions they had lost, in addition to Iskandariyah which they attacked from two flanks. Three days later, government troops recaptured Maardis as well. Fighting continued on 11 April, as the Army seized the “Russian Regiment” base, south of Suran.

=== All rebel gains reversed ===
On 14 April, the military launched an attack toward Halfaya, capturing several checkpoints south of the town. At the same time, the Army shelled rebel positions around Suran and Taybat al-Imam. However, despite these initial advances, the Army was eventually pushed back from Halfaya after suffering heavy casualties. Two tanks were also captured by the rebels.

On 16 April, following over 40 air-strikes against rebel supply lines the previous night, the Syrian Army recaptured Suran after 10 hours of intense fighting, thus reversing all rebel gains during the offensive. Several hours later, the rebels fired more than 40 Grad rockets towards Hama Military Airport, destroying a MIG-23 fighter jet and several large ammo depots.

=== Army push into rebel territory; Taybat al-Imam and Halfaya captured ===
On 17 April, the military launched an attack on Taybat al-Imam and reportedly captured a checkpoint at the eastern entrance to the town.

On 20 April, heavy fighting erupted in the areas of Taybat al-Imam and Halfaya, as government forces tried to capture both towns. Over the previous 48 hours, more than 400 air-strikes were conducted in the northern Hama countryside. Eventually, government troops managed to capture Taybat al-Imam and pushed further west towards Halfaya, taking a checkpoint. Subsequently, the rebels launched a counter-attack and managed to recapture large parts of Taybat al-Imam. However, after intense clashes that lasted several hours during the night, the military managed to push back the rebels and retain control of the town.

On 22 April, the Army expanded the buffer zone around Taybat al-Imam with new advances. The next morning, the Syrian Army captured Halfaya and began operations to capture Morek. These advances left government forces once again in control of all areas they had lost during the rebels' previous offensive in late 2016.

On 24 April, the Army continued its advance north towards Al-Lataminah and Morek. In the process, the SAA captured two or four more villages and a checkpoint, thus reaching the outskirts of Lataminah. The next day, the rebels partially recaptured Al-Massasnah in a counter-attack, before the Syrian Army regained their positions in the town the following morning, while also capturing the village of Zullaqiat, north of Halfaya. On 28 April, rebel forces again assaulted Al-Massasnah, but their attack was eventually repelled.

== Aftermath ==
On 19 September 2017, Hay'at Tahrir al-Sham, the Turkistan Islamic Party, and their allies launched a new offensive in northern Hama under the codename "Oh Servants of God, Be Steadfast". The rebels initially captured four villages, but after back-and-forth fighting during which the villages changed hands several times, government forces recaptured all of the villages by 22 September. 66 rebels and 38 soldiers were killed during the offensive, while more than 40 civilians were killed in nearly 500 air-strikes on about 40 towns and villages in retaliation for the rebel offensive.

== See also ==
- Idlib Governorate clashes (2017)
- Qaboun offensive (2017)
- Khan Shaykhun chemical attack
