= 2016 Hama offensive =

Syrian rebel campaign

- Part of the Syrian civil war and the Russian military intervention in Syria
Date	29 August – 6 November 2016 (2 months, 1 week and 1 day)
Location	Hama Governorate, Syria
Result	Rebel victory: Rebels capture Halfaya, Taybat al-Imam, Suran, Maardis, Ma'an and 37 other villages and hills; Offensive halted due to inter-rebel conflict; Army recaptures Suran, Maardis, Ma'an and 18 other villages and hills

Belligerents
Army of Conquest; Jabhat Fateh al-Sham; Ahrar al-Sham; Sham Legion; Ajnad al-Sham; Turkistan Islamic Party in Syria; Jabhat Ansar al-Din; Harakat Sham al-Islam; Harakat Fajr ash-Sham al-Islamiya; (Syrian opposition) Free Syrian Army; Ajnad al-Kavkaz; Junud al-Sham	(Syria) Syrian Arab Republic; Hezbollah; SSNP; Iranian paramilitaries Guardians of the Dawn; Russia (air strikes): Russian Air Force

Commanders and leaders
Omran Jabayereh † (Jund al-Aqsa senior commander); Abu Rayan Al-Hamwi † (leader of Abna al-Sham); Abu Jassem al-Sourani † (Abna al-Sham senior commander); Abu al-Baraa al-Hamawi (Army of Conquest commander); Abu Heidar al-Homawi † (Army of Conquest commander); Abu Mohammad Uzbeki † (Turkistan Islamic Party senior commander); Abu Omar Anatol † (Turkistan Islamic Party commander); Basel Marwan Al-Bakri † (Ajnad al-Sham assault troops commander); Abo Ahmad Nayef † (Jabhat Ansar al-Din commander); Abu Malek Al-Hamwi † (Junud al-Sham top commander); Maj. Jamil al-Saleh; Mahmoud al-Mahmoud (Jaysh al-Izza commander and spokesman); Abu Kinan (Jaysh al-Izza commander); Mohammed al-Ashqar † (Jaysh al-Izza commander, alleged); Capt. Mustafa Marati (Jaysh al-Izza commander); Abu Ahmed (Jaysh al-Nasr commander); Bassam Abo Duraid † (Jaysh al-Nasr commander); Baha'a Al-Nizal (executed) (Sham Legion commander of northern Hama operations); Adnan Hababa † (Sham Legion commander); Nayef al-Jar Abu Ahmad † (Sham Legion commander)	(Syria) Maj. Gen. Suhayl al-Hasan (Operations chief commander) (Syria) Brig. Gen. Ali Khallouf † (11th Division commander) (Syria) Maj. Gen. Ali Sharaf Makhlouf † (87th Mechanized Brigade commander) (Syria) Gen. Fadl al Din Myka'il /> (Syrian Army commander) (Syria) Brig. Gen. Mohamed Ali Habib † (Syrian Army commander) (Syria) Col. Ali Shaheen (Panther Forces commander) (Syria) Fuad al-Salah † (Leopard Forces commander) (Syria) Hassan Mahfoudh (Military Security Shield Forces commander) (Syria) Osama Zamam † (al-Assad Shield commander); Darioush Dorostei † (Iranian commander)

Units involved
Jabhat Fateh al-Sham; Katibat al-Tawhid wal-Jihad; Jamaat al-Murabiteen (part of JFS since 15 October); Jund al-Aqsa (part of Jabhat Fateh al-Sham since 9 October); Abna al-Sham; (Syrian opposition) Free Syrian Army; Sham Legion; (Syrian opposition) Jaysh al-Izza; (Syrian opposition) Jaysh al-Nasr; Ahrar Darayya; (Syrian opposition) Jaish al-Tahrir; Sham Front; (Syrian opposition) Free Idlib Army; (Syrian opposition) Northern Division	Syrian Armed Forces; Syrian Army; 11th Armored Division; 87th Mechanized Brigade; 47th Regiment; 3rd Armoured Division; Qalamoun Shield Forces; 4th Mechanized Division; 555th Special Forces Regiment; Tiger Forces; Panther Forces; Leopard Forces; Republican Guard; Syrian Marines; Desert Hawks Brigade; National Defence Forces; Mahardah unit; Al-Suqaylabiyah unit; Taybat al-Imam unit; Masyaf unit; Hama City unit; al-Assad Shield; Military Intelligence Directorate; Military Security Shield Forces; Air Force Intelligence Directorate; Unit 333; Sahabat Group; Syrian Arab Air Force; SSNP: Eagles of the Whirlwind; Al-Suqaylabiyah unit; Mahardah unit

Strength
5,500 fighters (pro-government claim)	4,000+: 1,000+ regular soldiers; 2,000+ Tiger Forces soldiers; "Hundreds" of fighters

Casualties and losses
217+ killed	84+ killed (20 executed), 1 helicopter downed
- 27 civilians killed(2 executed); 100,000 people displaced

The 2016 Hama offensive, codenamed as the Battle for the Sake of God by the rebels, was a military offensive operation launched by Syrian rebels during the Syrian civil war in the northern parts of Hama Governorate as an attempt to relieve pressure on rebels fighting in Aleppo city.

== The offensive ==
=== Rebels advance ===
The operation began on 29 August, with two Jund al-Aqsa suicide car bombings against Syrian Arab Army checkpoints near the village of al-Lataminah. Fierce fighting ensued, after which, the rebels managed to swiftly capture several villages. The local pro-government National Defense Forces militia were sent into a sudden and uncoordinated retreat, which lead to the rebels capturing the town of Halfaya.

Over the next 24 hours, the Syrian Air Force conducted 52 airstrikes, which killed at least 20 rebels, and soon after the Army managed to temporarily recapture one village, before they were pushed back once again. By the evening of 30 August, the rebels also managed to seize the town of Taybat al-Imam, as well as two other nearby villages. The next day, the rebels managed to enter the town of Suran, but were subsequently pushed back after failing to capture the town's center. However, four hours later, a second rebel attack was launched which ultimately ended in the rebel capture of Suran. Afterwards, the rebel forces led by Jund al-Aqsa began an attack on the Alawite village of Ma’an, claiming to already have captured a small barrier to the settlement's north and 4 checkpoints to the east.

The rebels seized the town of Maardis on 1 September, as well as a nearby village. During their advances at Maardis, the rebels had seized a missile base that was being prepared by Russian forces for use. Over the next four days, several unsuccessful Army counter-attacks were conducted in an attempt to recapture the town. At the same time elsewhere, rebel attacks on the villages of Ma’an, Kawkab and Jubbayn, were repelled by government troops.

On 2 September, a low-flying Aérospatiale Gazelle in the area was destroyed mid-air by a Jaysh al-Izza BGM-71 TOW missile. The next day, the Syrian Army temporarily recaptured Samam Hill, before losing it again later in the day. Two days later, government forces captured two hills overlooking the town of Qamhana, and forced the rebels to retreat from the town's outskirts.

=== Army counter-attack, new rebel advance and stalemate ===
During the second week of the offensive, the Syrian Army repelled rebel assaults on Ma’an and the neighboring Karah village. In the process, Syrian Army units recaptured the village of Btaysh. On 7 September, the Syrian Army and NDF units launched a new attack against Maardis and Taybat Al-Imam, clearing the area around Kawkab, and recaptured three villages by 9 September.

On the other hand, the rebels managed to capture Kawkab on 11 September, following a suicide attack against Army positions. Between 13–14 September, rebel forces launched several attacks near Maardis and Ma'an and took control of a number of checkpoints, though their assaults on the towns themselves were reportedly repelled by government forces.

As of 15 September, following the gains made in the previous two weeks, the rebels were preparing to start the second phase of their offensive to reach Hama city. At the same time, government forces were mobilizing for a counter-attack to regain all territory they had lost.

=== Further rebel gains ===
The Army launched its counter-attack on 21 September, and advanced, capturing a hilltop and several farms on the eastern edge of Maardis. The rebels claimed to have destroyed four Army tanks during the fighting and that they captured and executed 20 soldiers. The next day, the military seized several farms near Maardis. However, on 23 September, rebel forces reversed all government gains during a counter-attack, while there were conflicting reports on who controlled the village of Iskandariah. On the same day, Russian warplanes bombed a rebel headquarters in cave in Taybat al-Imam, killing 22 rebel fighters from the Free Idlib Army.

On 24 September, the rebels captured Ma’an and al-Kabariyyah after a short battle. The Syrian Army subsequently launched a small-scale counter-attack, reentering al-Kabariyyah. The rebels once again advanced and captured six more villages by 27 September. According to the Syrian Army, Jund al-Aqsa used chemical weapons against pro-government defenders as the group attacked and captured Karah on 28 September. In response to the rebel's advances, several pro-government units were sent as reinforcements to Hama province and soon after government forces announced a new counter-offensive.

By 29 September, the rebels had seized 42 towns, villages and hills. Meanwhile, the rebel group Ahrar Darayya (originating from Darayya) merged with Jaysh al-Nasr and joined the battle in northern Hama. On 6 October, it was reported that Fuad al-Salah, the prominent leader of the 'Leopard Militia', was killed in northern Hama.

=== Army counter-attack and government regains ground ===
One week later, while taking advantage of the rebel-infighting in the nearby Idlib province, the Syrian Army launched a counter-attack and was able to recapture 10 villages (including Qarah), several hills, two checkpoints and an airfield. The military continued to advance towards other nearby villages, specifically Ma'an, while a Russian air-strike directly hit a small convoy leaving Kawkab.

On 9 October, the Army recaptured two more villages (Ma'an and Kubbariyah), as well as parts of Kawkab. Renewed fighting for Ma'an took place later that night, and by the next day both villages were again rebel-held. Subsequently, government troops launched a new assault on Ma'an, and the town, along with nearby Kawkab, was heavily hit by air-strikes. On 11 October, the Army seized Kawkab, as well as Kubbariyah once again. A subsequent rebel counter-attack against Kawkab was repelled, with the rebels reportedly suffering heavy casualties. Two days later, the Army captured Ma'an, as well as a nearby hill.

On 16 October, government forces seized Maardis and the village of Iskandariah. The advance came after Army units managed to take control of the nearby Al-Abbadah hill the previous day and establish fire control over Maardis. The rebels subsequently launched a counter-attack before nightfall in an attempt to regain both Maardis and Iskandariah. Government control of Maardis remained tenuous as fighting continued into the evening. By the next day, the counter-attack had been repelled. During the fighting, the rebels managed to temporarily regain the town before losing it again.

Early on 18 October, an Army assault on Suran started, with government troops managing to capture a base near the town. Government attempts to advance continued the next day.

Early on 24 October, clashes took place around al-Remelia, near Salamiyah, while the government prepared a new assault to regain Taybat al-Imam and Souran from the rebels. Later on, the Army advanced west of Ma'an and into the eastern outskirts of Souran, leading to fierce clashes with rebel defenders. The next day, the Army advanced west of Ma'an and recaptured Dharat Al-Fitas, Talat Khirbat and the Madajnah Checkpoint after pushing further towards the key town of Morek. Meanwhile, Jund al-Aqsa fighters executed Baha'a Al-Nizal, the leading commander of Jaysh al-Farouq in northern Hama, for unknown reasons. On 27 October, government forces advanced into Souran after capturing the nearby hilltop of Tal Al-Dour, resulting in a fierce battle, which lasted until the rebels retreated, allowing the Army to secure the town completely. Meanwhile, clashes also took place in Taybat al-Imam.

Between 28 October and 4 November, the military made advances north of Souran and Ma'an, capturing a checkpoint, the village Al-Buwaydah and several hills. On 4 November, the military continued its advance and took three checkpoints south of the rebel stronghold of Morek.

On 5 November, the military advanced at the village of Lehaya, south of Morek. Concurrently, the rebels launched a counterattack, capturing a checkpoint and Shalyut village to the north of Mhardeh. However, subsequently, after the arrival of military reinforcements, government forces recaptured all lost territory. Still, on 6 November, the rebels managed to recapture two checkpoints and a hill south of Morek that they had lost earlier.

== Aftermath ==
On 24 November, the Syrian Army recaptured a small village and a hilltop near Ma'an from the rebels just a few days after they had lost them in a rebel attack.

On 21 March 2017, rebel groups led by Hay'at Tahrir al-Sham launched another offensive in northern Hama, with the aim to recapture the towns of Suran and Maardis, which was recaptured by the SAA during the 2016 offensive. The offensive began with the launch of two suicide car-bombs.

== See also ==
- 2015 Hama offensive
- Northwestern Syria offensive (April–June 2015)
- Northwestern Syria offensive (October–November 2015)
- Battle of Maarat al-Numan (2016)
