= Zor Abu Zayd =

Zor Abu Zayd زور أبو زيد
- Village
- Location in Syria
- Coordinates: 35°14′26″N 36°39′35″E
- Country: Syria
- Governorate: Hama
- District: Hama
- Subdistrict: Suran

Population (2004)
  - Total: 838
- Time zone: UTC+3 (AST)
- City Qrya Pcode: C3024

Zor Abu Zayd (Arabic: زور أبو زيد) is a Syrian village located in the Suran Subdistrict in Hama District. According to the Syria Central Bureau of Statistics (CBS), Zor Abu Zayd had a population of 838 in the 2004 census.
