= Khirbet al-Hajama =

Khirbet al-Hajama خربة الحجامة
- Village
- Location in Syria
- Coordinates: 35°12′32″N 36°41′29″E
- Country: Syria
- Governorate: Hama
- District: Hama
- Subdistrict: Suran

Population (2004)
  - Total: 1,020
- Time zone: UTC+3 (AST)
- City Qrya Pcode: C3019

Khirbet al-Hajama (Arabic: خربة الحجامة) is a Syrian village located in the Suran Subdistrict in Hama District. According to the Syria Central Bureau of Statistics (CBS), Khirbet al-Hajama had a population of 1,020 in the 2004 census. Its inhabitants are predominantly Sunni Muslims.

== Bibliography ==
- Robinson, E.; Smith, E. (1841). Biblical Researches in Palestine, Mount Sinai and Arabia Petraea: A Journal of Travels in the year 1838. Vol. 3. Boston: Crocker & Brewster.
