= Al-Junaynah =

Al-Junaynah الجنينة Jneineh
- Village
- Location in Syria
- Coordinates: 35°20′51″N 36°55′3″E
- Country: Syria
- Governorate: Hama
- District: Hama
- Subdistrict: Suran

Population (2004)
  - Total: 341
- Time zone: UTC+3 (AST)
- City Qrya Pcode: N/A

Al-Junaynah (Arabic: الجنينة, also spelled Jneineh) is a village in central Syria, administratively part of the Suran Subdistrict of Hama District, located 85 kilometers (53 mi) northeast of Hama. The village lies on the road connecting Hama with Aleppo via al-Hamraa and Qasr Ibn Wardan. It is 10 kilometers (6.2 mi) from the ancient town of Androna.

According to the Syria Central Bureau of Statistics (CBS), al-Junaynah had a population of 341 in the 2004 census. Its inhabitants are Alawites. The main economic activity in the village is rainfed agriculture and sheepraising.

== History ==
In 1890, al-Junaynah was sold by the Ma'adid clan of the Mawali tribe of central Syria to the prominent Kaylani family of Hama. Its inhabitants were Alawite tenant farmers who were originally settled there to cultivate its lands in the 1920s or early 1930s.

In 1990, a municipality was established to administer the village.

== Bibliography ==
- Comité de l'Asie française (April 1933). "Notes sur la propriété foncière dans le Syrie centrale (Notes on Landownership in Central Syria)". Bulletin du Comité de l'Asie française (in French). 33 (309). Comité de l'Asie française: 131–133.
