= Mawali (tribe) =

Arab tribe in Syria

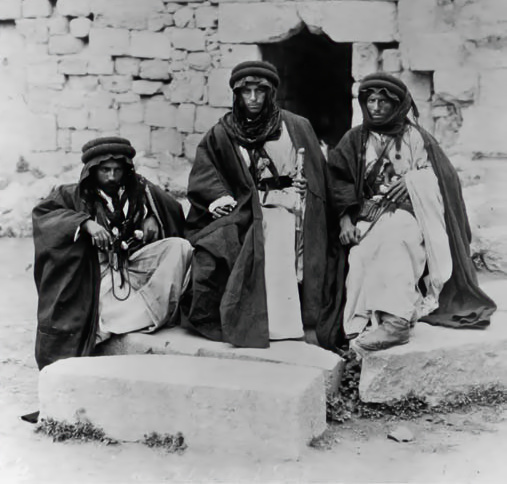
Sons of the Mawali sheikh Ali Diyab, 1880s

Mawali (Arabic: مَوَالِي, romanized: Mawālī) is an Arab tribe based in northwestern and central Syria, mainly in the regions of Idlib and Hama.

The tribe's origins are obscure, but by the 16th century it combined semi-nomadic sheepherders and camel-raising nomads of different origins. At that time, their leading family was the Al Fadl (also called Al Hayar), whose chiefs had been formally recognized as the amir al-arab (commander of the Bedouin) of the Syrian steppe since the Ayyubid period in the 13th century. The Ottomans, who conquered Syria in 1516, initially sought to force the tribe's submission, but by 1574 recognized the Mawali's emirs in this office, after which the Al Hayar became known as the Al Abu Risha (possessors of the plume).

The Mawali continued to be the dominant tribe of the Syrian steppe until the late 18th century when they were driven out by the Hassana, newcomers belonging to the great Anaza confederation of Arabia. The Mawali thereafter took abode in the Jabal Zawiya and Jabal al-A'la highlands of northwestern Syria. They continued to wield significant influence in the Hama Sanjak and were entrusted with policing duties to protect the villages there from Bedouin raids. Nevertheless, their capacities continued to diminish. Leaders of the tribe, particularly from the Khurfan family, played a significant role helping resettle the desert fringes around Hama in the mid-19th century.

During French rule, the Mawali, by then a semi-nomadic sheepherding tribe, joined the Syrian nationalist cause, fighting the French in the Great Syrian Revolt (1925–1927). Throughout the 1920s and early 1930s they were in frequent war with the Hadidiyin tribe, which had friendly relations with the authorities. Today, the tribe is fully settled and inhabits around sixty villages in the Idlib Governorate and the Hama Governorate. During the Syrian civil war, the Mawali fought in the ranks of the Syrian opposition against the Syrian government.

== Location ==
Location of Mawali in Syria

The Mawali tribe is presently settled in roughly sixty villages in the Idlib Governorate and, to a lesser extent, in the rural areas of Homs. Many of the Sunni Muslim Arabs of the Hama region are descendants of the Mawali, such as the inhabitants of Kafr Zita, Suran and Jubbayn.

== History ==
The origins of the Mawali are obscure, though they were reputedly descended from a large troop of former slaves or branched off the Beshar, another tribe originally composed of former slaves.

=== Ottoman era ===
==== Domination of the Syrian steppe ====
The Ottomans conquered Syria in 1516. By this period, the Mawali were a loose confederation of tribes, the original component having long disappeared as the tribe incorporated different groups. The heterogenous Mawali combined semi-nomadic shepherding pastoralists and fully nomadic camel and horse-raising tribesmen. Their territory spanned the expanse between Hama and Homs in the west, the Palmyra oasis in the east and the Euphrates River valley in the north. This gave them control over the key trade routes between Baghdad and Damascus and between Aleppo and Iran. Among their strongholds was the fortified town of Salamiyah.

The Mawali derived their prestige among other tribes from their leading family, the princely Al Abu Risha. The latter had been the emirs of the Al Fadl, a tribe which had dominated the Syrian Desert since the Ayyubid (1180s–1260) and Mamluk (1260s–1517) periods. The emirs of the Al Fadl had traditionally held the official post of amir al-arab (commander of the Bedouins). The Ottomans were reluctant to continue this office and launched multiple military campaigns to force the tribe's submission. Unable to bring the Mawali to heel, the Ottoman government co-opted them. The Al Fadl emirs of the tribe thereafter gained the name Abu Risha ('father of the plume') when their emir was granted a ceremonial feather and a stipend of 6,000 Venetian ducats by the Ottoman sultan in 1574 in recognition of their privileged status.

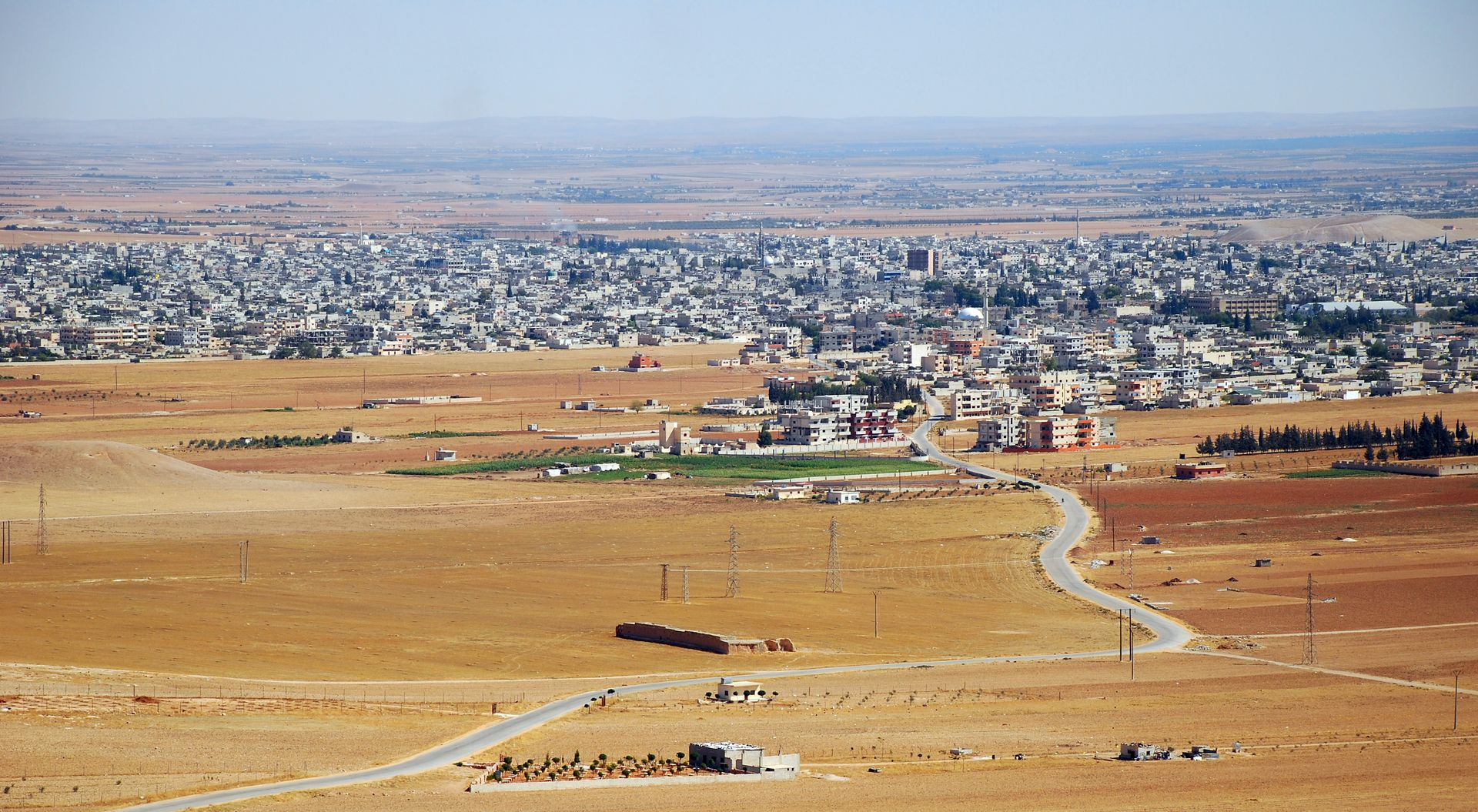
View of Salamiyah in 2009. This area was the former stronghold of the Mawali.

The Abu Risha emirs of the Mawali were tasked with protecting the roads between Syria and Iraq. Throughout the 16th and early 17th centuries, the tribe generally stayed loyal to the state and adhered to its duties. There were occasional lapses, sometimes a result of internal power disputes within the tribe, such as the Mawali's devastating raid against the Aleppo garrison in 1644.

Beginning in the mid-17th century, the Mawali's role as guardian of the Syrian steppe wavered and by the end of the century, their power had deteriorated. Possible reasons for this decline include tribal migrations to and from the steppe or shifts in the overland trade routes which traversed it. Nomadic tribes of the Anaza and Shammar confederations of northern Arabia began to enter the Syrian desert and Euphrates valley in their migratory cycles by the 18th century and challenged Mawali hegemony there. During this period (late 17th–early 18th centuries), droughts spurred frequent raids by Bedouin, including the Mawali, and peasant groups in the areas of Aleppo, Hama, Homs and Damascus. The Mawali often targeted the markets of Hama and Homs. This phenenomenon subsided by the 1720s. A 1735 agreement between the Mawali sheikh and the governor of Aleppo specified the sheikh was to protect peasants and travelers from highway robbers and the depredations of other Bedouin tribes along the Euphrates River valley from Bira to Ridwaniyya.

==== Conflict with the Anaza Bedouin and revolts ====
Mass migrations of Anaza Bedouin into the Syrian steppe commenced in the late 18th century. In the 1770s the Mawali were regularly in conflict with the Hassana, the first of the Anaza Bedouin tribes to enter the region. The Hassana gradually pushed the Mawali out of their traditional abodes in the Syrian steppe into the Jabal Zawiya and Jabal al-A'la highlands around Hama, forcing the tribe to fight for pastures and control there. In the latter part of this decade, the displaced Mawali fought several skirmishes with the local authorities. They took captive Abd al-Rahman Bey, a leading member of the al-Azm family of Hama, whose members often served as provincial governors in Syria. In the same incident, they captured Abd al-Razzaq al-Jundi, the agha of the Talbiseh fortress, whom they executed.

In 1786, under their emir Muhammad al-Khurfan, the Mawali revolted, raiding numerous villages in the plains around Hama, including the eastern foothills of the Alawite Mountains. Unlike their previous raids, the tribe killed large numbers of village elders and rural military officials. Ottoman provincial troops counterattacked and massacred the Mawali, with hundreds of tribesmen slain. The villages of Jabal Zawiya were devastated in the government offensive and the area experienced mass abandonment due to the tribal uprising, so much so that taxes were substantially reduced there to encourage resettlement. The abortive revolt sealed the tribe's loss of their dominant position in the Syrian steppe east of Hama and Homs. The Hassana, and later another Anaza tribe, the Fad'an, were then accorded the Mawali's previous rights to collect tolls from the caravans traversing through Palmyra.

While the Mawali was a diverse grouping of tribes, which included sedentary and sheepherding elements along the cultivated areas bordering the desert, the Anaza were purely nomadic camel raisers who migrated to northern Arabia en masse in the winter. This gave them the advantage of high mobility and they maintained their dominant role in the steppe. Despite the paramountcy of the Anaza and the Mawali's diminishing capacities, the Mawali sheikhs continued to be vested with official titles and policing duties, which the government did not bestow on the militant Anaza tribes. Nevertheless, the latter occasionally cooperated with the state against the Mawali. In 1811, the Anaza backed the governor of Aleppo, Mehmed Recep Pasha, against the Mawali, which had allied with the Janissaries of Aleppo against the governor. The Mawali emir, Kunj (son of Muhammad Khurfan), was lured to the governor's palace for a banquet and was killed there. The Mawali retaliated with raids against Aleppo.

==== Role in the Hama and Aleppo sanjaks ====
By the early 19th century, many of the twenty-five tribes in the Hama Sanjak either belonged to the Mawali or were affiliated with the tribe. The Mawali of Hama were the older-established Shamali (Northern) faction, mainly composed of the Masharifa, Bani Izz and Tuqan clans. The Qibli (Southern) faction, represented by the Jamajima and Khutaba clans, did not pay taxes in the Hama Sanjak, but nevertheless frequently pitched their tents near the villages there. Other tribes in the Hama region, such as the Fawa'ira, were formed out of breakaway factions of the Mawali. The small but militant Turki tribe may also have been of Mawali origin. The Mawali's principal foes were the Turki and Hadidiyin, the latter having migrated to the Hama region from the steppe near Aleppo and the Euphrates valley in the mid-18th century due to pressures from the Fad'an.

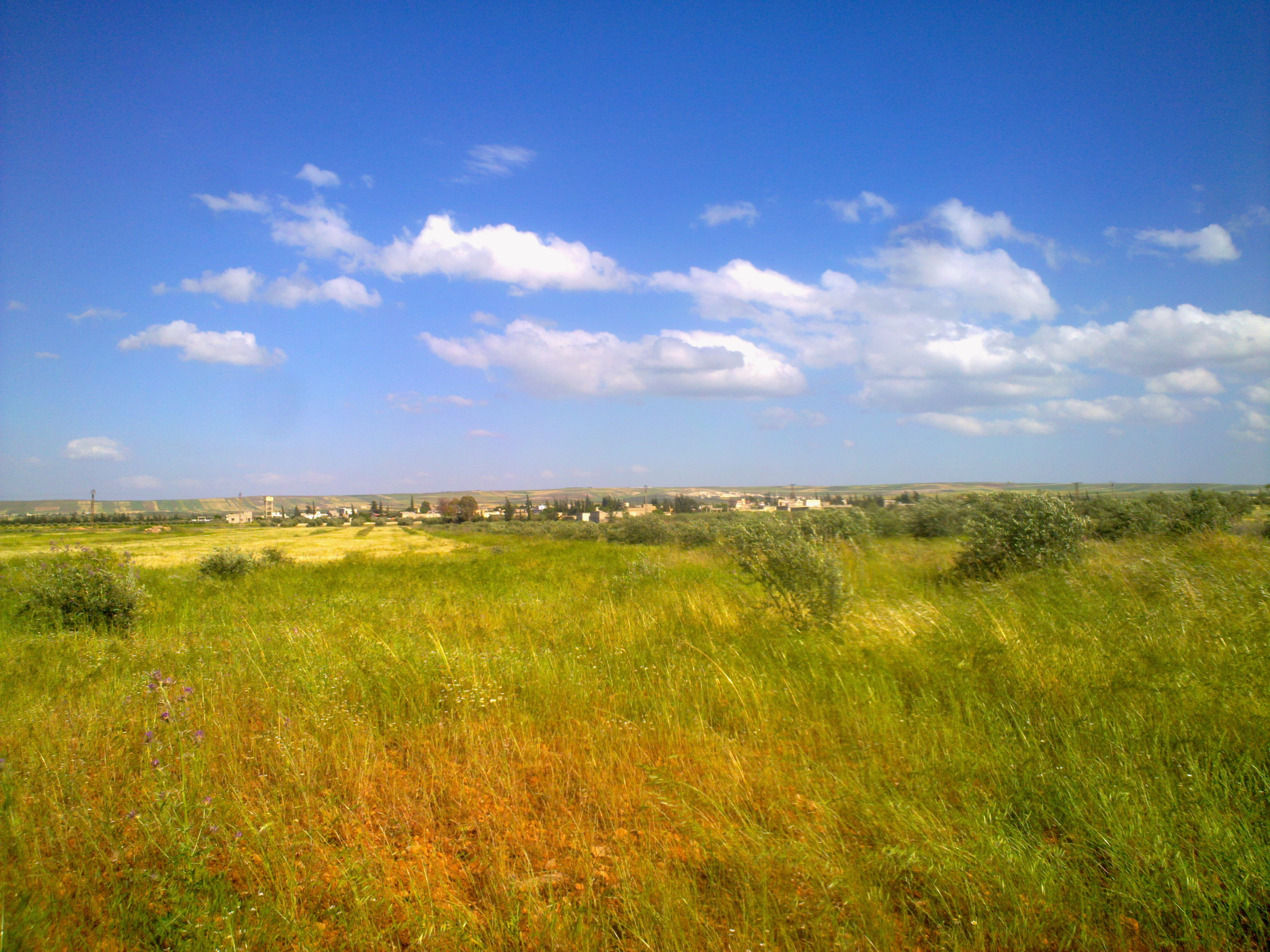
Village of Hama depicting the steppe biome

The only military officials of Arab descent in the Hama Sanjak were the aghawat (sing. agha), who likely all served in the retinue of the serkeder urban (chief of the Bedouin) of Hama. This was a hereditary office of the emir of the Mawali's Masharifa clan, particularly the Khurfan family. Its holder was paid a stipend, the muwassata, by the local government for police duties, namely protecting the villages from Bedouin raids. Although the efficacy of the office waned with the rise of the Anaza in the steppe east of Hama, the Mawali serkeder continued to receive his stipend. The expenditure of the muwassata was distributed amongst the villages of Hama, Homs and Maarat al-Nu'man. The most distinguished Mawali serkeder of this period was Muhammad al-Khurfan. Johann Ludwig Burckhardt, visiting Syria in 1810, noted that the provincial government of Aleppo also paid the Mawali emir there an annual stipend, though the chief's 400-strong horsemen were "reckoned treacherous and faithless" by the authorities.

In 1832 Ottoman Syria was taken over by the autonomous government in Egypt under Ibrahim Pasha. Revolts against the new government erupted throughout Syria in 1834, including among the Anaza tribes of the steppe. The Mawali under Muhammad Khurfan were enlisted in the government's military campaigns against the Anaza tribe and once again performed policing duties in the steppe during this period. The Egyptian administration stimulated the recultivation and repopulation of the Hama region, increasing the cultivated areas by 60% by the time Egyptian rule ended in 1841. Muhammad Khurfan, along with the mutasallims (subgovernors) Faraj Agha and Uthman Agha, was one of the most prolific partners of the government, heavily investing in the recultivation of the villages east of Hama, most of which was populated by tribesmen of the Mawali, as well as of the Nu'aym and Uqaydat.

Towards the end of Ottoman rule, between 1880 and 1915, the leaders of the Mawali, including their leading family the Masharifa, sold several villages around Hama to the notable families of Hama city, including the Azm, Kaylani, Baroudi and Barazi. Among these villages were Kawkab, Qara'ah, Jneineh, Jurniyat, Kibari, Ma'an, and Taybat al-Ism.

=== French Mandatory rule ===
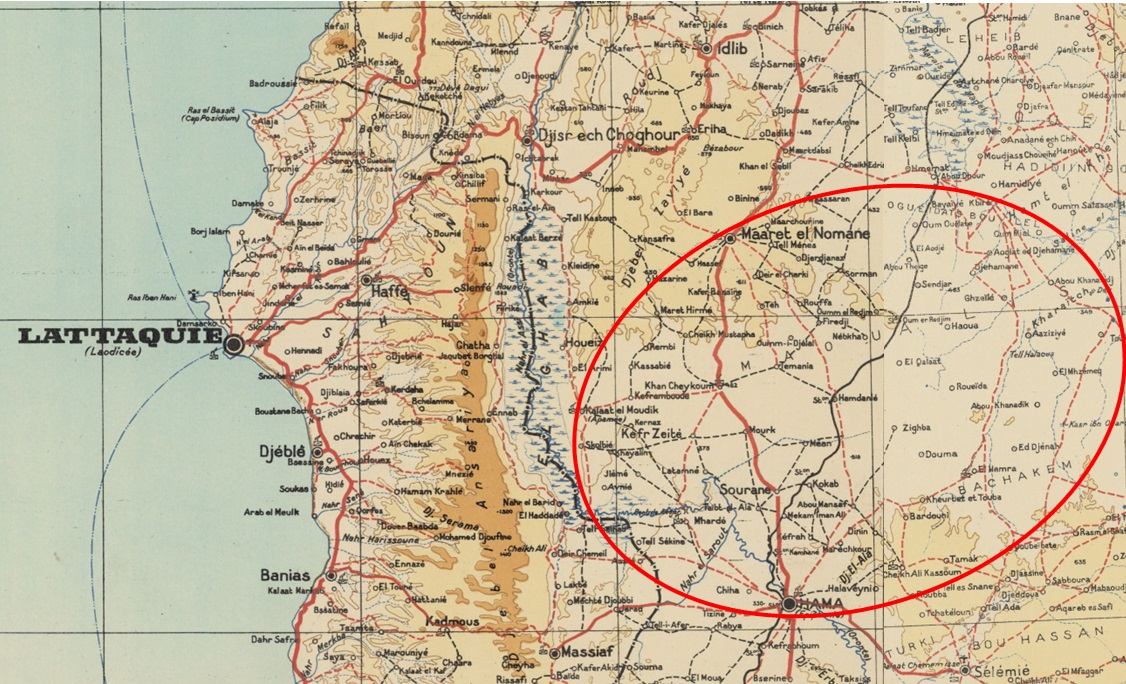
Tribal territory of the Mawali (written 'Maoualis') in French Mandatory Syria

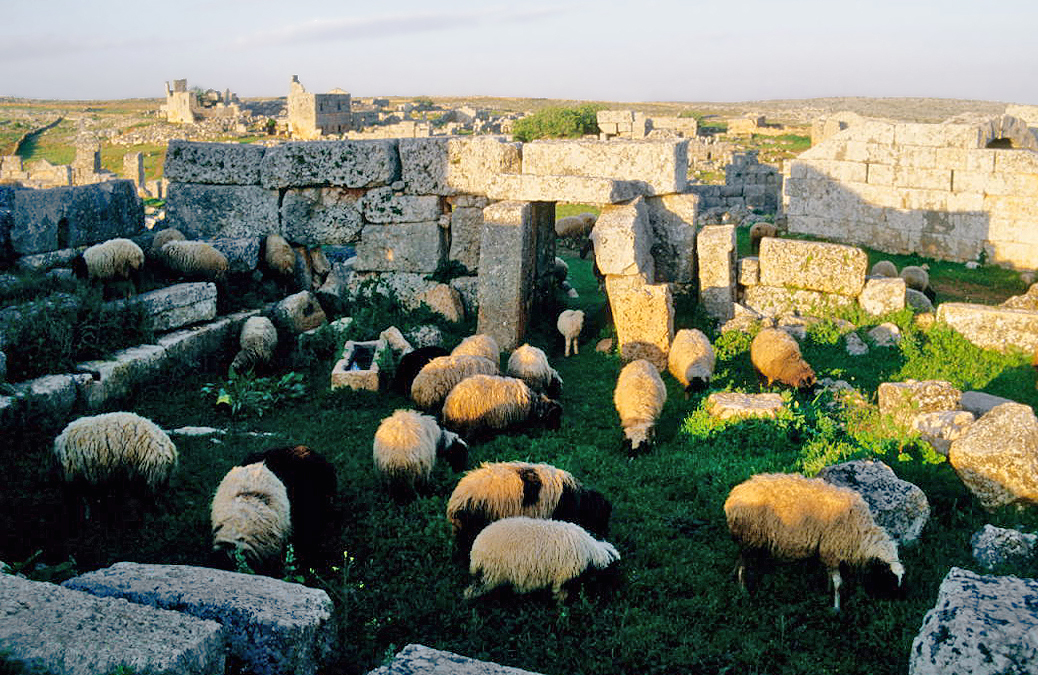
Sheep grazing among the ruins of the Dead City of Serjilla in Jabal Zawiya, 2001

The French gained control of Syria in 1920. By then the Mawali were a sheepherding tribe (asha'ir ghanama), as opposed to the Shammar and Anaza tribes which continued to be camel-raisers who traveled up to 1,000 kilometers (620 mi) into the desert. The seasonal migratory routes of the Mawali, in contrast, were significantly shorter; the tribe encamped in the cultivated areas of northwestern Syria (the ma'mura) in the summers and the Syrian steppe in the winters.

Throughout the 1920s and early 1930s the Mawali were engaged in a tribal war with the Hadidiyin, initially over watering rights and later as part of the tribes' relations with the French authorities and the Syrian nationalist cause. In 1921 the Mawali sabotaged rail tracks in northern Syria, prompting the French to dispatch troops against them, though the leaders of the tribe avoided punitive action when they submitted to the authorities soon after. The Mawali continued to be viewed as agitators by the authorities. They were blamed by the government for reigniting the war with the Hadidiyin, whose leadership was cultivating ties with the French, in 1924–1925, and allying with the nationalist activists in central Syria's cities. Amid the Great Syrian Revolt of 1925, the Mawali joined the nationalists in the abortive 1925 Hama uprising against the French. During that time they also attacked French troops at Maarat al-Nu'man.

In the aftermath of their raids against the French in 1925, the Mawali fled to British-controlled Iraq. Upon their return to the Hama region in 1926, French troops assaulted them by land and aerial bombardment. As a result, the Mawali formally surrendered and paid a fine of 5,000 gold pounds and 1,200 rifles. Two of their leaders, Faris al-Attur and Shayish ibn Abd al-Karim, were arrested and imprisoned in Aleppo. The tribal warfare with the Hadidiyin subsequently subsided until breaking out again in October 1930 when the Mawali emir was killed by the Hadidiyin. The French militarily intervened to separate the two sides. Another attack by the Hadidiyin against the Mawali in December 1932 provoked a clash between the two tribes and a raid by the Mawali in which numerous Hadidiyin livestock were seized; the Mawali returned the animals after French pressure. The tensions between the two tribes continued to be a source of aggravation for the government, which thereafter attempted to resolve the recurring conflict by physically separating the tribes' migratory routes in the hopes this would reduce friction over pasturage and watering points.

=== Post-Syrian independence ===
During the Syrian civil war, the Mawali tribe was among the first Arab tribes in Syria to rebel against the government in 2012. It formed the Mawali Brigade which fought under the auspices of the Free Syrian Army in Idlib. Members of the Mawali joined Syrian rebel forces fighting against the Syrian government in confrontations around Maarat al-Nu'man, Hama, Aleppo and Raqqa. The current head of the tribe is Sheikh Jamal al-Shayish.

== Bibliography ==
- Chatty, Dawn (2017). Syria: The Making and Unmaking of a Refuge State. New York: Oxford University Press. ISBN 9780190876067.
- Comité de l'Asie française (April 1933). "Notes sur la propriété foncière dans le Syrie centrale" [Notes on Landownership in Central Syria]. Bulletin du Comité de l'Asie française (in French). 33 (309). Comité de l'Asie française: 131–137.
- Douwes, Dick (2000). The Ottomans in Syria: A History of Justice and Oppression. I. B. Tauris. ISBN 1860640311.
- Dukhan, Haian (2019). State and Tribes in Syria: Informal Alliances and Conflict Patterns. Abingdon, UK and New York: Routledge. ISBN 978-1-351-02542-3.
- Dukhan, Haian (2022). "Tribes at War: The Struggle for Syria". In Gani, Jasmine K.; Hinnesbusch, Raymond (eds.). Actors and Dynamics in the Syrian Conflict's Middle Phase: Between Contentious Politics, Militarization and Regime Resilience. Abingdon, UK and New York: Routledge. pp. 214–235. ISBN 978-1-03-218502-6.
- Masters, Bruce (2013). The Arabs of the Ottoman Empire, 1516–1918: A Social and Cultural History. New York: Cambridge University Press. ISBN 978-1-107-03363-4.
- Neep, Daniel (2012). Occupying Syria Under the French Mandate: Insurgency, Space and State Formation. New York: Cambridge University Press. ISBN 978-1-107-00006-3.
- van der Steen, Eveline (2014). Near Eastern Tribal Societies During the Nineteenth Century: Economy, Society and Politics Between Tent and Town. Abingdon, UK and New York: Routledge. ISBN 978-1-908049-83-4.
