= Jamil al-Saleh =

Syrian general (born 1974)

Brigadier General Jamil al-Saleh
- Native name: جميل الصالح
- Born: 1974 (age 50–51) Al-Lataminah, Hama, Syria
- Allegiance: Ba'athist Syria (?–2012); Syrian opposition (2012–2024); Jaysh al-Izza (2015–2025); Syria (since 2025)
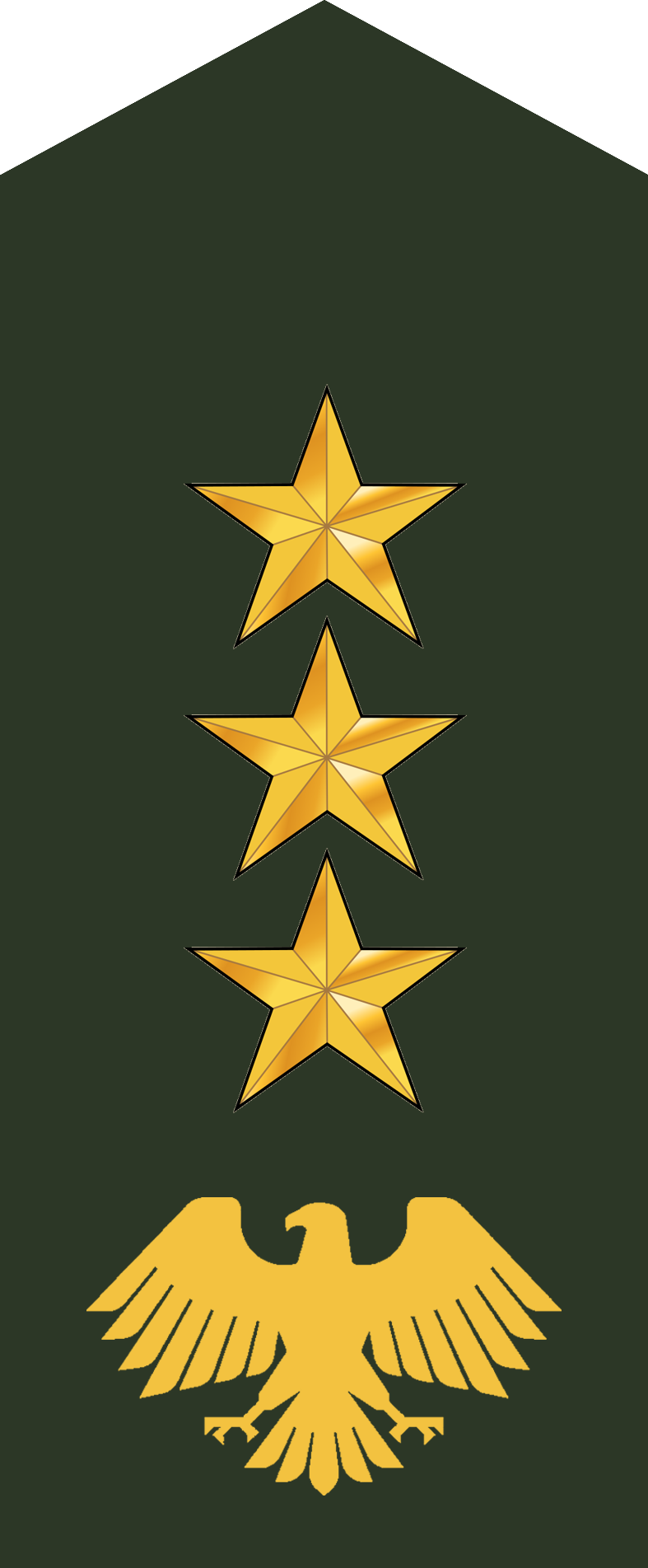
- Rank: Brigadier General
- Commands: Lataminah Martyrs Brigade (2012–2013); Gathering of Battalions and Priority of Glory (2013–2015); Jaysh al-Izza (2015–2025); 74th Division (since 2025)
- Conflicts: Syrian Civil War; Northwestern Syria offensive (October–November 2015); 2016 Hama offensive; Hama offensive (March–April 2017); Northwestern Syria offensive (April–August 2019); 2024 Syrian opposition offensives; Battle of Aleppo (2024); 2024 Hama offensive

Jamil Shahada al-Saleh (Arabic: جميل شحادة الصالح) is a Syrian military officer and former opposition leader, serving as the founding commander of Jaysh al-Izza until its dissolution following the fall of the Assad regime. On 19 February 2025, he was appointed commander of the 74th Division.

== Early life and career ==
He was born in Al-Lataminah, Hama, in 1974.

Prior to the Syrian revolution, Jamil served as a major in the 17th Reserve Division of the Syrian Arab Army (SAA) in the city of Raqqa.

== Role during the Syrian civil war ==
Upon the outbreak of the Syrian civil war in 2011, he defected from the SAA in February 2012 and joined the Free Syrian Army (FSA). He planned to defect earlier, in August 2011, with his cousin and ally, Lieutenant Colonel Samer al-Saleh, but delayed it after Samer was arrested by the Air Force Intelligence Directorate on charges of participating in pro-opposition demonstrations.

On 7 April 2012, Syrian government forces committed a massacre in his hometown of Al-Lataminah, in which 12 of his family members were killed.

On 1 May 2012, he founded the Lataminah Martyrs Brigade, an FSA faction, in Jabal al-Zawiya, which later merged with other FSA factions to become the Gathering of Battalions and Priority of Glory on 1 January 2013.

On 1 July 2015, he announced the establishment of Jaysh al-Izza, the largest opposition faction operating in northern rural Hama at the time, with him serving as its commander-in-chief.

During the 2015 Northwestern Syria offensive, Jamil told Orient News that the opposition factions were "trying to reorganize the ranks of fighters on the various fronts and combat axes through which the regime is attempting to penetrate the region", adding that they were also "seeking to develop a new military plan through which we can inflict a second defeat on Assad's forces in the northern Hama countryside".

Jamil commanded Jaysh al-Izza during the 2016 Hama offensive, stating in an interview with Shaam News Network that the reasons behind the offensive were to "liberate the areas occupied by Assad's gangs, Iranian and Shiite gangs, and the terrorist Hezbollah gangs", as well as to relieve the pressure on the rebels during the Battle of Aleppo by opening another front.

He criticized the Astana peace negotiations, saying in an interview with Syria TV in 2019 that "since the first Astana conference, we knew that the Russians were planning this conference to circumvent the Syrian revolution", adding that, according to him, the Astana negotiation's goals were to "divide Syrian regions, isolate them from each other, and attack them one by one", and that the agreements "were all against the interests of the Syrian people and their revolution," describing them as "the greatest deception of the Syrian revolution".

During the Dawn of Idlib offensive, Jamil said in a tweet that the reasons Assad regime forces were advancing was because of "the factions' trust in the conferences", "the surrender of the weak to the political position", "not dealing with the Russians as an occupier, and "the slowness in making decisions". Jaysh al-Izza also was one of the factions to be part of the Military Operations Command, an opposition military operations room based in northwestern Syria, upon its establishment in June 2019, alongside Hay'at Tahrir al-Sham and the National Front for Liberation.

In a press conference on 12 October 2023 held by leaders within the Military Operations Command, he said that "had it not been for achieving a balance of terror with the enemy through the bombing and precision strikes during the recent escalation, I would not have requested a ceasefire", adding that "the free Syrians deserve a free and dignified life away from the Assad gang and its criminal allies, and we pledge to our people to devote all our efforts and energies to achieving the goals of the Syrian revolution".

His faction participated in Operation Deterrence of Aggression, an offensive spearheaded by Hay'at Tahrir al-Sham beginning on 27 November 2024, which led to the fall of the Assad regime on 8 December. During the offensive, Jaysh al-Izza fought on the frontlines of rural southern Idlib and northern Hama.

=== Assassination attempts ===
On 12 March 2015, while Jamil was driving on the Khan Shaykhun-Kafrsajna road in Idlib, his car was shot at by unknown assailants, though he was not injured.

On 26 October 2015, while he was travelling between Maarat al-Numan and Saraqib on the M5 highway, unknown assailants planted an explosive device on the right side of the road that his car was passing through, which damaged his car but didn't injure him. A source close to him told Akhbar Al Aan that the Assad regime had offered financial rewards to anyone who could assassinate Jamil, along with other FSA leaders.

On 24 February 2016, he survived an assassination attempt after Russian warplanes bombed his faction's headquarters in Al-Lataminah, suffering minor injuries while several other Jaysh al-Izza members present were wounded and one killed.

On 11 March 2018, Jamil was ambushed by unknown assailants in northern rural Hama, who shot him while he was on an inspection visit to the southern Idlib frontlines, though he survived and his escorts clashed with the group which carried out the ambush.

== Post-Assad ==
On 29 December 2024, he was promoted to colonel by Syria's caretaker government alongside other opposition figures. Two days later, he was promoted to brigadier general.

Al-Saleh attended the Syrian Revolution Victory Conference on 29 January 2025, and his faction announced its dissolution and incorporation into the Ministry of Defense.

On 19 February 2025, he was appointed commander of the 74th Division.
