= Zor al-Haysa al-Sharqiyah =

Zor al-Haysa al-Sharqiyah زور الحيصة الشرقية
- Village
- Location in Syria
- Coordinates: 35°16′44″N 36°38′29″E
- Country: Syria
- Governorate: Hama
- District: Hama
- Subdistrict: Suran

Population (2004)
  - Total: 768
- Time zone: UTC+3 (AST)
- City Qrya Pcode: C3023

Zor al-Haysa al-Sharqiyah (Arabic: زور الحيصة الشرقية) is a Syrian village located in the Suran Subdistrict in Hama District. According to the Syria Central Bureau of Statistics (CBS), Zor al-Haysa al-Sharqiyah had a population of 768 in the 2004 census.
