= Sha'tah =

Sha'tah الشعثة
- Village
- Location in Syria
- Coordinates: 35°21′13″N 36°53′39″E
- Country: Syria
- Governorate: Hama
- District: Hama
- Subdistrict: Suran

Population (2004)
  - Total: 103
- Time zone: UTC+2 (EET)
  - Summer (DST): UTC+3 (EEST)
- City Qrya Pcode: C3017

Sha'tah (Arabic: الشعثة) is a hamlet in central Syria, administratively part of the Suran Subdistrict of the Hama District. According to the Syria Central Bureau of Statistics (CBS), Sha'tah had a population of 103 in the 2004 census.

== History ==
In the late 19th or early 20th century, Sha'tah was sold by the Bani Khalid tribe of central Syria to the urban notables of Hama. Its inhabitants were Sunni Muslims.

== Bibliography ==
- Comité de l'Asie française (April 1933). "Notes sur la propriété foncière dans le Syrie centrale (Notes on Landownership in Central Syria)". Bulletin du Comité de l'Asie française (in French). 33 (309). Comité de l'Asie française: 131–133.
