= Taybat al-Ism =

Taybat al-Ism طيبة الاسم
- Village
- Location in Syria
- Coordinates: 35°19′6″N 36°51′40″E
- Country: Syria
- Governorate: Hama
- District: Hama
- Subdistrict: Suran

Population (2004)
  - Total: 463
- Time zone: UTC+3 (AST)
- City Qrya Pcode: C3027

Taybat al-Ism (Arabic: طيبة الاسم, romanized: Ṭayyibat al-Ism) is a village in central Syria, administratively part of the Suran Subdistrict of Hama District, located northeast of Hama. According to the Syria Central Bureau of Statistics (CBS), Taybat al-Ism had a population of 463 in the 2004 census. Its inhabitants are Sunni Muslims.

== History ==
Taybat al-Ism was owned by a sheikh of the Mawali tribe, who sold it to the prominent landowning Azm family of Hama in 1880. Its inhabitants were Sunni Muslim Arabs.

== Bibliography ==
- Comité de l'Asie française (April 1933). "Notes sur la propriété foncière dans le Syrie centrale (Notes on Landownership in Central Syria)". Bulletin du Comité de l'Asie française (in French). 33 (309). Comité de l'Asie française: 130–136.
- Douwes, Dick (2000). The Ottomans in Syria: A History of Justice and Oppression. I.B. Tauris. ISBN 1860640311.
