= Hasana =

Arab tribe in Syria

The Hasana (Arabic: الحسنة; also spelled Hassanah or Hassaneh) is an Arab tribe resident in central Syria in villages east of Hama and Homs. In the mid-18th century, the tribe became the first of the Anaza tribes to relocate to Syria from Najd and has retained varying degrees of influence in this region through Ottoman, Hashemite and French rule and in post-independent Syria.

== History ==
=== Ottoman period ===
The Hasana are a branch of the Anaza tribal confederation and had particularly close tribal links to Al Saud, which established the Emirate of Najd in the 18th century. The Hasana were the first Anaza tribe to migrate to Syria, arriving in 1757. By the 1770s they were frequently feuding with the long-established Mawali tribe over control of the northern Syrian plains. By the late 1780s, the Hasana drove the Mawali out of their traditional pasture grounds in the steppes of Hama and Homs. Thereafter, the Hasana under their leader Muhanna al-Fadil, became the prominent Bedouin tribe in this region and gained government sanction to collect tolls from the caravans on the road to and from Palmyra. Additionally, the Hasana collected tribute, known as the khuwwa, from the weaker tribes long established in these steppes and the villages there.

Despite their overpowering of the tribes east of Hama and Homs, the Hasana were not solidly established in the region as they wintered deep into the Syrian Desert, sometimes as far as northern Arabia. Their position was increasingly challenged in the early 19th century by another branch of the Anaza, the Fad'an and their subordinates, the Siba'a. In 1814, large numbers of the Fad'an and Siba'a entered the plains east of the Orontes River, prompting the Hasana and the Rwala (another Anaza subtribe) to ally with local and provincial troops to drive them out. The Fad'an and Siba'a held out for two weeks and forced the local and regular troops to withdraw before the Hasana drove them out. While the Fad'an retreated on that occasion, they frequently returned to the area and raided the Hasana west of Hama.

=== French Mandatory period ===
The Ottomans lost Syria to the Triple Entente forces in 1916–1918, during World War I. The leader of the Hasana, Trad al-Milhim was among the Syrian tribal sheikhs to enter Damascus with the victorious Entente-backed Emir Faisal. Two years later, Syria came under the French Mandate of Syria and Lebanon. As part of their attempts to co-opt the Arab tribes of the Syrian steppe, the French authorities paid stipends to the heads of the tribes and awarded cooperative tribes with pasture and property rights. The Hasana under Trad al-Milhim was allotted substantial landholdings, with some twenty villages registered in his name in the 1930s. He became dependent on government support to enforce his control, losing his traditional authority.

=== Post-Syrian independence ===
The Hasana continue to inhabit villages ease of Homs and Hama, with their headquarters in Buwaydah. In 1977 the Syrian tribes experienced a surge of influence at the parliamentary level, with results engineered by the government of President Hafez al-Assad. Among the beneficiaries were Trad al-Milhem who won a seat representing the Homs Governorate. In 1994 the government gave two parliamentary seats representing Homs to the Hasana's leadership, Abdel Aziz Trad Milhim and his nephew Abdel Karim. The Hasana's leadership remained loyal to the Syrian government throughout the Syrian civil war.

== Bibliography ==
- Darke, Diana (2018). The Merchant of Syria: A History of Survival. New York: Oxford University Press. ISBN 9780190874858.
- Douwes, Dick (2000). The Ottomans in Syria: A History of Justice and Oppression. New York: I. B. Tauris. ISBN 1-86064-031-1.
- Dukhan, Haiyan (2019). State and Tribes in Syria: Informal Alliances and Conflict Patterns. Abingdon and New York: Routledge. ISBN 978-1-138-49483-1.
