= Jaysh al-Izza =

Rebel group in northwest Syria

Army of Glory
- جيش العزة; Jaysh al-Izza
- Leaders: Maj. Jamil al-Saleh (commander-in-Chief); Col. Mustafa Bakour (spokesman); Capt. Manaf Maarati (deputy commander, until October 2019); Capt. Mustafa Maarati (spokesman, until October 2019)
- Dates active: 2012–2025
- Group: Homs al-Adiya Brigades
- Headquarters: Kafr Nabl area (August 2019-February 2020), Jisr al-Shughur (per pro-government reports), formerly al-Lataminah
- Active regions: Hama Governorate; Idlib Governorate; Latakia Governorate
- Ideology: Sunni Islamism
- Size: 3,000 (late 2015); September 2019: 2,500 (HTS defector claim); Over 3,000 (pro-government media claim); ≤3500 (December 2021) (per SOHR)
- Part of: Free Syrian Army; Jaysh al-Nasr (2015); Military Operations Command
- Wars: Syrian civil war; Siege of Northern Homs; 2014 Hama offensive; Insurgency in Idlib; Al-Ghab offensive (July–August 2015); Northwestern Syria offensive (October–November 2015) (Russian intervention); 2015 Hama offensive; 2016 Latakia offensive; 2016 Hama offensive; Hama offensive (March–April 2017); Hama offensive (September 2017); Northeastern Hama offensive (2017); Syrian Liberation Front–Tahrir al-Sham conflict; Idlib demilitarization (2018–2019); Northwestern Syria offensive (April–August 2019); Northwestern Syria offensive (December 2019–March 2020); 2024 Syrian opposition offensives; Western Syria clashes

The Army of Glory (Arabic: جيش العزة, romanized: Jaysh al-Izza), formerly the Union of Glory (Arabic: تجمع العزة, romanized: Tajamu' al-'Izza), was a Sunni Islamist Syrian rebel group affiliated with the Free Syrian Army active in northwestern Syria, mainly in the al-Ghab Plain in northern Hama and its surroundings. Turkey, Qatar, and Saudi Arabia have supplied the group with anti-tank missiles including 9K111 Fagots and BGM-71 TOWs. As of 2019, was estimated to have between 2,000 and 5,000 fighters in its ranks.

The group has vehemently denounced Russia's intervention in the Syrian civil war and has also expressed its opposition to Russian-backed diplomatic initiatives such as the Astana and Sochi tracks. Jaysh al-Izza also made efforts to join the Turkish-backed National Front for Liberation which includes other prominent Syrian opposition groups in Idlib such as Ahrar al-Sham and the Sham Legion, but did not do so out of complications with the integration about which Jaysh al-Izza's leadership did not elaborate.

In 2024, Jaysh al-Izza participated in the 2024 Syrian opposition offensives against the Syrian government.

Later on 29 January 2025, at the Syrian Revolution Victory Conference, most factions of the armed opposition, including the Jaysh al-Izza, announced their dissolution and were incorporated into the newly formed Ministry of Defense.

== History ==
=== Before 2020 ===
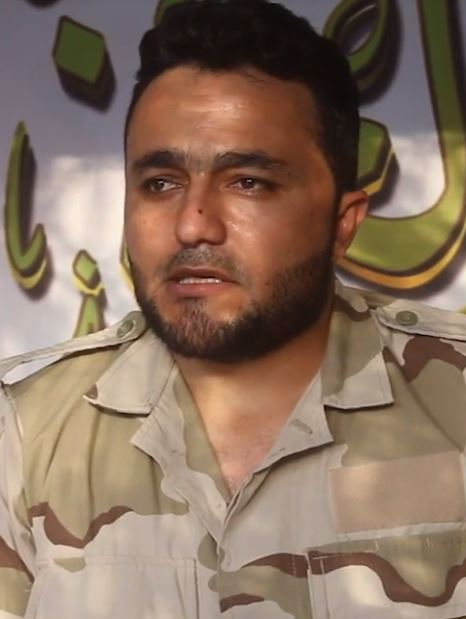
Mustafa Maarati, the spokesman of Jaysh al-Izza from c. 2015 until October 2019

The Army of Glory started under the name of the Martyrs of Latamneh Brigade at the beginning of 2012, then it turned into the Gathering of Glory/Union of Glory in 2013 and then the Army of Glory at the end of 2015, where many revolutionary brigades and battalions from multiple specializations joined the gathering, so the leadership decided to form an organized army and attract the largest number of officers who are good in leading battles who defected from Syria.

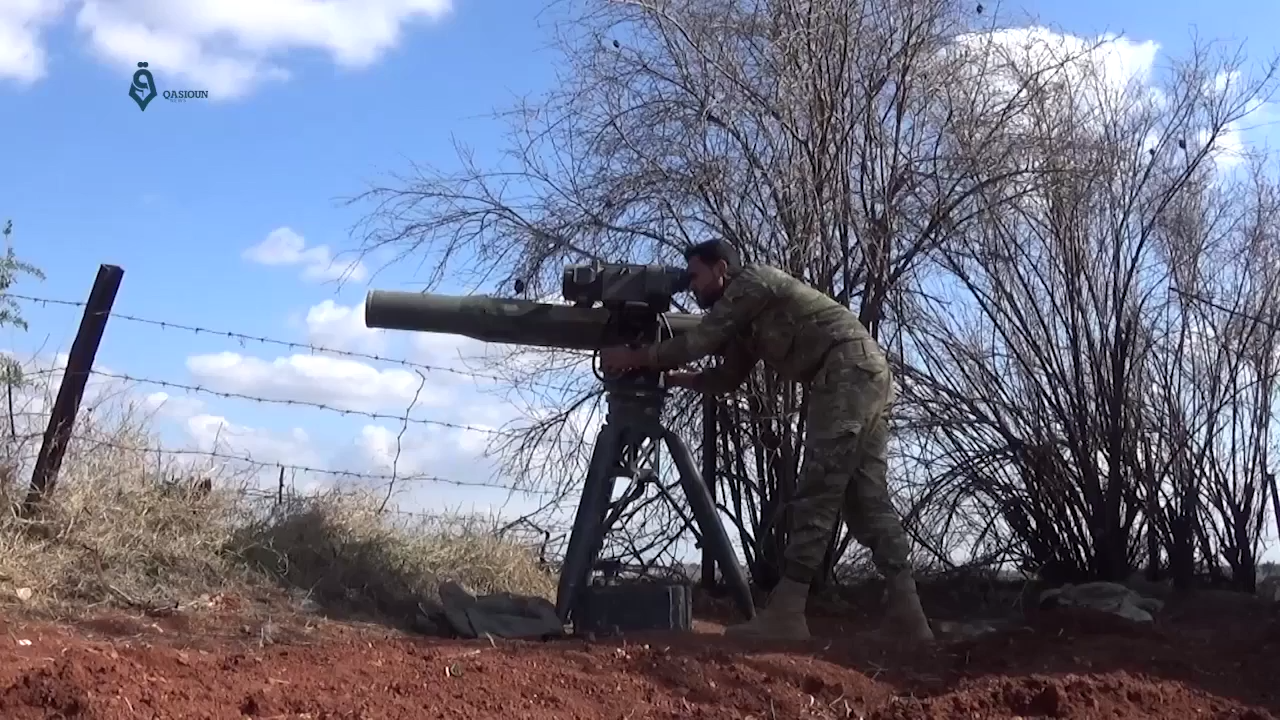
An Army of Glory fighter launches a BGM-71 TOW anti-tank missile at a Syrian government position during the 2017 Hama offensive.

On 30 September 2015, the first day of the Russian military intervention in the Syrian civil war, 2 Russian bombs with 8-10 submunitions struck the group's headquarters and arms depots in a cave in the village of Al-Lataminah in northern Hama.

During the 2016 Hama offensive in September 2016, Jaysh al-Izza used a BGM-71 TOW missile to blow up a low-flying Aérospatiale Gazelle helicopter, which they alleged to be Russian.

In September 2018, Jaysh al-Izza originally accepted the Idlib demilitarization (2018–2019) brokered by Russia and Turkey, with the group's leadership extending their gratitude to the Turkish President Erdoğan for coordinating the agreement. The group later became hostile to the agreement, however, after it was revealed that Syrian Government and other pro-Assad forces would not be required to withdraw from the DMZ and would instead be responsible for governing the opposition-held areas.

On 8 June 2019 Abdel Baset al-Sarout, a senior Jaysh al-Izza commander and key member of the Syrian opposition, died from the wounds he sustained during combat with the Syrian Army two days prior. Parts of the northern countryside of Hama were captured by the Syrian Arab Army during its 2019 Northwestern Syria offensive, after Jaysh al-Izza, among other rebel groups, withdrew from the region to avoid being encircled by government forces.

On 11 August 2019, Samer al-Saleh, a commander in the group, retired due to "personal matters.".

=== 2020-2023 ===
The group moved its headquarters to the Kafr Nabl area, which came under Russian attack on several occasions.

Jaysh al-Izza significantly declined and left in a state of disarray following defeat in the Syrian Army's Dawn of Idlib 1 campaign. The group lacked funding and military aid except for ammunition stores already available in Idlib and money received from supporters. It also suffered a decline in popularity with Syrian Opposition supporters due to a failure to comply with military determinants, and the group's perceived closer relations with Hay'at Tahrir al-Sham. The group also faced a rash of defections. On 9 October 2019, 500 fighters from Jaysh al-Izza, including its deputy commander-in-chief Capt. Manaf Maarati and spokesman Capt. Mustafa Maarati, reportedly defected to the National Front for Liberation. This reportedly left less than 500 soldiers in Jaysh al-Izza.

In early November 2019, the Homs al-Adiyyeh Brigade of the Sultan Murad Division of the Syrian National Army defected to Jaysh al-Izza after the unilateral release of several Syrian Army prisoners of war by the Turkish government in the context of the Second Northern Syria Buffer Zone.

On 23 November 2019, Russian warplanes carried out airstrikes on Jaysh al-Izza's headquarters near Kafr Nabl, killing two fighters and injuring six.

In late January 2020, Mustafa Bakour announced publicly his groups participation in the battle for Idlib, though Jaysh al-Izza had reportedly participated since the fighting began.

On 24 January 2020, Jaysh al-Izza's anti-armor squadron reportedly destroyed a missile launch platform of the Syrian army using an anti-tank thermal guided missile in the village of Tah.

On 27 January 2020 Jaysh al-Izza took part in a counterattack along with HTS, Rouse the Believers Operations Room, and Ansar al-Tawhid against the Syrian Army and Iranian-backed militias in several villages east of Idlib.

On 30 January 2020, the Russian Air Force carried out airstrikes on Jaysh al-Izza's headquarters following the beginning of recruitment by the latter, killing three fighters and injuring several others.

On 16 February Jaysh al-Izza targeted a group of Syrian Army soldiers with a thermal-guided ATGM on the Abdeen village axis.

Following the end of fighting, Jaysh al-Izza continued recruitment, holding several graduations of fighters including special forces in July 2020, at a training camp near the Bab al-Hawa Border Crossing.

=== 2024-2025 ===
On 15 July 2024, according to social media reports, Jaysh Al-Izza repelled an attempt by pro-Assad forces to advance on the axis of the town of Al-Bara in the southern countryside of Idlib.

In November 2024, Jaysh al-Izza remained active in northwestern Syria, The group has continued to engage in military operations and offensives

In 2024, Jaysh al-Izza participated as a part of the Military Operations Command in the 2024 Syrian Opposition offensives that led to the fall of the Assad regime and the formation of the Syrian Transitional Government.
