= Mustafa Bakour =

Syrian general (born 1964)

Brigadier General Mustafa Bakour
- مصطفى بكور

Chief of Staff of the Syrian Air Force
- Incumbent
- Assumed office 14 March 2025
- President: Ahmed al-Sharaa
- Deputy: Hassan Hamada
- Preceded by: Adel Jadallah Qaysar

Personal details
- Born: 1964 (age 61–62) Kafr Zita, Hama, Syria
- Children: 2

Military service
- Allegiance: Syria (2024–present); Formerly: Ba'athist Syria (1987–2011); Syrian opposition (2011–2024)
- Branch/service: Syrian Air Force (1987–2011; 2025–present)
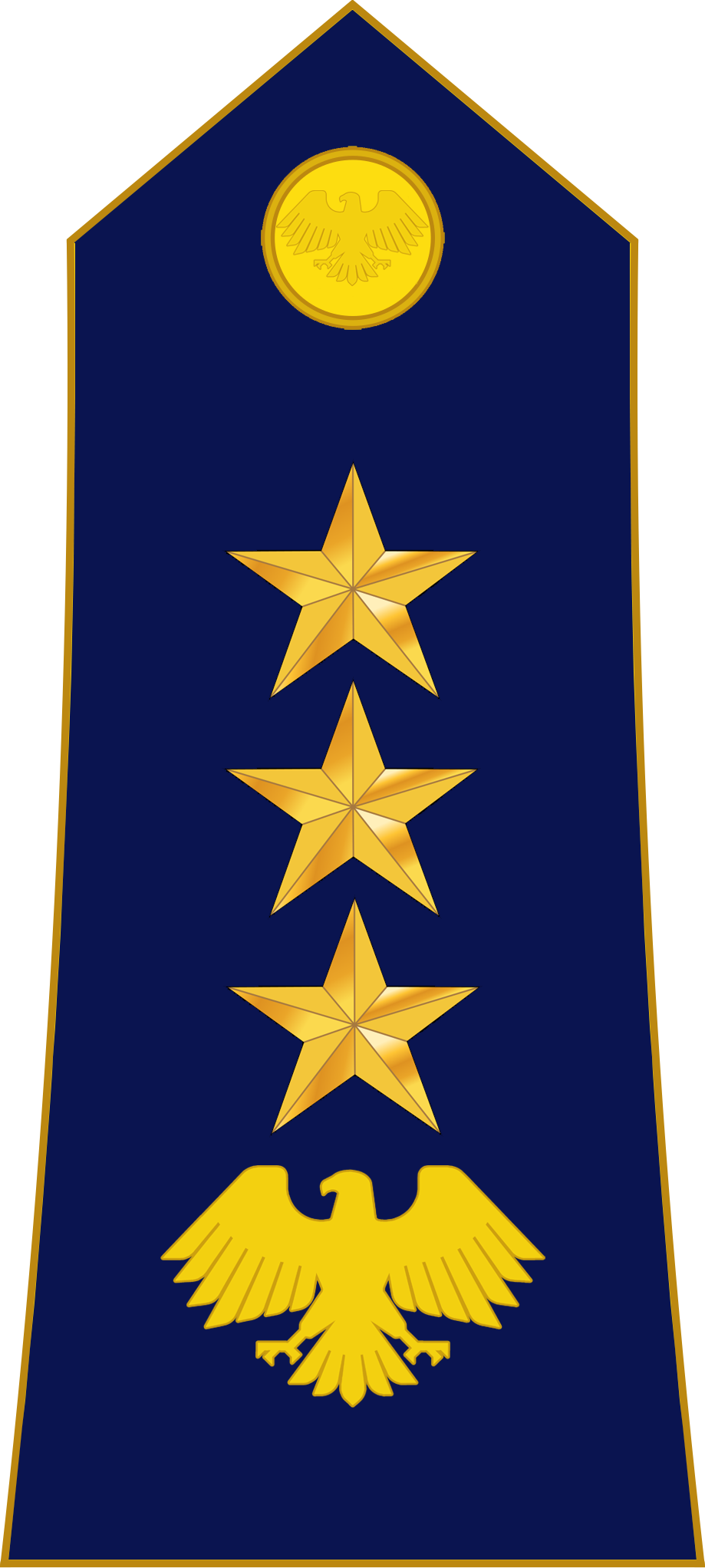
- Rank: Brigadier general
- Unit: Jaysh al-Izza (2011–2025)
- Battles/wars: Syrian Civil War; Northwestern Syria campaign (October 2017 – February 2018); Northwestern Syria offensive (April–August 2019); Northwestern Syria offensive (2019–2020); 2024 Syrian opposition offensives

Mustafa Hussein Bakour (Arabic: مصطفى حسين بكور) is a Syrian military officer currently serving as Chief of Staff of the Syrian Air Force following the fall of the Assad regime. During the Syrian civil war, he had previously served as deputy commander-in-chief and spokesman of Jaysh al-Izza.

== Education and early career ==
He was born in Kafr Zita, Hama, in 1964. He obtained a high school diploma in the scientific branch of a local school in 1984. He joined the Air Force Academy and graduated in 1987 with the rank of pilot lieutenant after successfully completing the training program on an Aero L-39 Albatros.

Similarly to other Syrian pilots, Bakour moved across various Syrian airports and completed courses on various combat aircraft, such as the Mikoyan-Gurevich MiG-21 and the Sukhoi Su-17, before settling on the Sukhoi SU 22-M4 at Tiyas Air Base for 21 years. During that time period, he reached the level of a day and nighttime flight instructor and test pilot. He also later served in the 22nd Air Defense Division, and commanded a squadron of fighter warplanes.

== Role during the Syrian civil war ==
In 2012, following the start of the Syrian revolution, he defected from the Assad regime and joined the Syrian opposition. He fought alongside opposition factions in northwestern Syria, and joined Jaysh al-Izza in 2016. He held various leadership roles in Jaysh al-Izza, serving as its deputy commander-in-chief and official spokesman, as well as working in moral guidance.

During the Syrian civil war, his house was destroyed and his family was displaced, with his son Muhammad being killed in battle and his son Hussein being severely injured.

He participated in the 2024 Syrian opposition offensives alongside his faction. In an interview with Al Jazeera Arabic on 29 November, Bakour stated that the opposition factions were pursuing "Iranian militias and removing them from areas from which they can target civilians, especially since they and the regime forces still pose a danger to the lives of civilians, and it is the duty of the revolutionaries to end this danger". He said that it would be hard to determine if they could capture Aleppo because of many variables. He also believed that Turkey might intend to diplomatically take advantage of the increased pressure on the Assad regime because of the offensive.

== Post-Assad ==
On 14 March 2025, he was appointed Chief of Staff of the Syrian Air Force, holding the rank of brigadier general.
