= Kawkab, Hama =

Kawkab كوكب
- Village
- Location in Syria
- Coordinates: 35°17′57″N 36°48′8″E
- Country: Syria
- Governorate: Hama
- District: Hama
- Subdistrict: Suran

Population (2004)
  - Total: 1,639
- Time zone: UTC+3 (AST)
- City Qrya Pcode: C3037

Kawkab (Arabic: كوكب; also transliterated as Kokab) is a village in central Syria, administratively part of the Suran Subdistrict of Hama District, located about 20 kilometers (12 mi) east of Hama. According to the Syria Central Bureau of Statistics (CBS), Kawkab had a population of 1,639 in the 2004 census. Its inhabitants are Sunni Muslims.

== History ==
In 1905, during Ottoman rule (1517–1918), Kawkab was sold by a sheikh of the Mawali, a partly Bedouin tribe of central-northern Syria, to the prominent landowning al-Azm family of Hama. Its inhabitants were Sunni Muslim Arab tenant farmers.

As of 2010, Kawkab's economy was based on agriculture, trade and self-employment outside the village, with most workers engaged in agriculture. Pistachios and olives were the main agricultural crops, and to a lesser extent wheat, cumin and lentils.

== Bibliography ==
- Comité de l'Asie française (April 1933). "Notes sur la propriété foncière dans le Syrie centrale (Notes on Landownership in Central Syria)". Bulletin du Comité de l'Asie française (in French). 33 (309). Comité de l'Asie française: 130–136.
