= Maardis =

Ma'ardis معردس
- Municipality
- Location in Syria
- Coordinates: 35°15′16.56″N 36°45′19.44″E
- Country: Syria
- Governorate: Hama
- District: Hama
- Subdistrict: Suran

Population (2004)
  - Total: 6,750
- Time zone: UTC+3 (AST)
- City Qrya Pcode: C3031

Maardis (Arabic: معردس, romanized: Maʿardas; also transliterated Ma'ardas) is a village in central Syria, administratively part of the Suran Subdistrict of Hama District, located 15 kilometers (9.3 mi) north of Hama. It lies in close proximity to the mountain of Jabal Zayn al-Abidin and the hill and spring of Tell Abbada. According to the Syria Central Bureau of Statistics (CBS), Maardis had a population of 6,750 in the 2004 census. Its inhabitants are Sunni Muslims.

== History ==
According to an Ottoman government record from 1818, Maardis consisted of 27 feddans, paid 1,320 qirsh in taxes to the government, as well as 4,720 qirsh in illegal exactions to the mutasallim of Hama, Faraj Agha. Maardis was recorded as a Sunni Muslim village in 1838.

The inhabitants of Maardis sold or 'ceded' much of their lands to the urban notables of Hama in the late 19th or early 20th centuries. By the early 1930s, one such family, the Kaylani, owned 32 shares of the village's lands while the remaining 33 shares were split amongst twenty clans (fakhd) who were in frequent dispute over ownership rights. The inhabitants were Sunni Muslim Arabs.

In 1974, a municipality was established to administer Maardis. As of 2010, its master plan consisted of 340 hectares.

On 30 November 2024 during the Hama offensive, Hay'at Tahrir al-Sham (HTS) rebels captured the city from the Syrian Army but were repulsed not long afterward. On 3 December, HTS regained control over the city.

== Bibliography ==
- Comité de l'Asie française (April 1933). "Notes sur la propriété foncière dans le Syrie centrale (Notes on Landownership in Central Syria)". Bulletin du Comité de l'Asie française (in French). 33 (309). Comité de l'Asie française: 130–136.
- Douwes, Dick (2000). The Ottomans in Syria: a history of justice and oppression. I.B. Tauris. ISBN 1860640311.
- Robinson, E.; Smith, E. (1841). Biblical Researches in Palestine, Mount Sinai and Arabia Petraea: A Journal of Travels in the year 1838. Vol. 3. Boston: Crocker & Brewster.
