= Jarniyet Eltar =

Coordinates: 35.3753°N 36.4244°E

Jarniyet Eltar جرنية الطار
- Village
- Location in Syria
- Country: Syria
- Governorate: Hama
- District: Al-Suqaylabiyah District
- Subdistrict: Al-Suqaylabiyah Nahiyah

Population (2004)
  - Total: 1,780
- Time zone: UTC+3 (AST)
- City Qrya Pcode: C3120

Jarniyet Eltar (Arabic: جرنية الطار) is a Syrian village located in Al-Suqaylabiyah Nahiyah in Al-Suqaylabiyah District, Hama. According to the Syria Central Bureau of Statistics (CBS), Jarniyet Eltar had a population of 1,780 in the 2004 census.
