= Suran, Hama Governorate =

City in Syria

Suran صوران Ṣūrān
- City
- Location of Suran in Syria
- Coordinates: 35°17′23″N 36°44′36″E
- Country: Syria
- Governorate: Hama
- District: Hama
- Subdistrict: Suran
- Elevation: 350 m (1,150 ft)

Population (2004)
  - Total: 29,100
- Time zone: UTC+3 (AST)
- Geocode: C3026

Suran (Arabic: صوران, romanized: Ṣūrān) is a city in central Syria, administratively part of the Hama Governorate. In the 2004 census, Suran had a population of 29,100. Its inhabitants are predominantly Sunni Muslims.

== History ==
Suran was a small village at the onset of Ottoman rule (1517–1917), having a population of only 9 households in 1526. In 1838, it was recorded as a Sunni Muslim village.

During French Mandatory rule (1923–1946), the Bulletin du Comité de l'Asie française noted that the inhabitants of Suran and nearby Kafr Zita "were still proud" of their descent from the Mawali tribe. For much of the Ottoman period, the Mawali were Bedouins who dominated the northern and central Syrian desert until they were driven closer to Hama and Aleppo in the late 18th century by the Anaza, a Bedouin tribal confederation from Najd (central Arabia).

The Bulletin, writing in 1933, noted that the inhabitants of Suran, like several other places whose residents were of Bedouin origin near Hama, owned their lands collectively and subject to periodic sharing (musha'). The village was wealthy and well-cultivated. This, and its close proximity to the city of Hama, had long made the village an attractive investment for Hama's landowning elites. Unlike numerous other villages in the vicinity, especially Alawite villages, the Sunni Muslim residents of Suran staved off attempts by the urban elite to gain ownership of their lands. Such an attempt had occurred in 1929, when Suran's mukhtar (headman) was prosecuted by the authorities for arms smuggling. The notables of Hama offered to support the mukhtar and the villagers against the legal proceedings in exchange for some plots of land in Suran. The mukhtar, conscious that this would allow the urban elite a foothold in the village, as had happened in other nearby places, rejected their offer.

=== Syrian civil war ===
In 2024, as part of the Syrian opposition offensive and Syrian Army retreat, the town was occupied by Tahrir al-Sham (HTS). On 2 December 2024, heavy fighting occurred in the area. On 3 December, HTS regained control over the city.

== Bibliography ==
- Comité de l'Asie française (April 1933). "Notes sur la propriété foncière dans le Syrie centrale (Notes on Landownership in Central Syria)". Bulletin du Comité de l'Asie française (in French). 33 (309). Comité de l'Asie française: 130–136.
- Douwes, Dick (2000). The Ottomans in Syria: A History of Justice and Oppression. I.B. Tauris. ISBN 1860640311.
- Robinson, E.; Smith, E. (1841). Biblical Researches in Palestine, Mount Sinai and Arabia Petraea: A Journal of Travels in the year 1838. Vol. 3. Boston: Crocker & Brewster.
