= Suran Subdistrict, Hama Governorate =

Suran Subdistrict ناحية صوران
- Subdistrict (nahiyah)
- Location in Hama Governorate

- Location in Syria
- Country: Syria
- Governorate: Hama
- District: Hama District
- Capital: Suran

Population (2004)
  - Total: 90,654
- Time zone: UTC+2 (EET)
  - Summer (DST): UTC+3 (EEST)
- Nahya pcod: SY050101

Suran Subdistrict (Arabic: ناحية صوران) is a nahiyah (subdistrict) located in Hama District in the Hama Governorate, northwestern Syria.

According to the Syria Central Bureau of Statistics (CBS), Suran Subdistrict had a population of 90,654 people in the 2004 census.
