= Timeline of US intervention in Syria =

- Part of Operation Inherent Resolve, the military intervention against ISIL, and the foreign involvement in the Syrian Civil War
- Top: Territorial map before the fall of the Assad regime Bottom: current territorial map Syrian Government Army Turkish-backed Free Syrian Army & others Syrian Democratic Forces Tahrir al-Sham ISIL (For a more detailed, up-to-date, interactive map, see here.) a
Date	22 September 2014 – 16 April 2026 (11 years, 6 months, 3 weeks and 4 days)
Location	Syria
Result	US-allied victory: 19,786 U.S. and allied airstrikes, over 16,000 hitting ISIL positions.; Thousands of targets destroyed, thousands of militants killed.; ISIL loses most of its territory in Syria by December 2017.; ISIL suffers military defeat and loses almost all of its remaining territory in March 2019.; U.S. and allies supplying weapons and advisers to the Kurdish-led Syrian Democratic Forces.; U.S.-backed rebel training program from 2014 to 2016.; U.S.-led occasional strikes against the Syrian Ba'athist regime.; U.S. Marines and Special Operation forces deployed in Syria (about 2,000, as of early Dec 2017).; Planned withdrawal of most U.S. troops in late 2020.; Further decline of Russia–United States relations.; Death of Abu Bakr al-Baghdadi ISIL leader in October 2019.; Death of ISIL's leader Abu Ibrahim al-Hashimi al-Qurashi in February 2022.; Death of ISIL's leader Abu al-Hussein al-Husseini al-Qurashi during clashes in April 2023.; Attacks on U.S. bases in Syria from 2023 to 2024.; US-backed rebels enter Damascus and topple the Syrian Ba'athist regime.; US military officially completes a full withdrawal from military bases in Syria on April 16, 2026.

Belligerents
CJTF–OIR; Air war and ground forces: United States; France; United Kingdom; Former participants: Canada (2014–16); Bahrain (2014–16); Belgium (2014–17); Qatar (2014–16); Morocco (2014–16); Australia (2014–17); Netherlands (2014–19); Saudi Arabia (2014–18); United Arab Emirates (2014–18); Jordan (2014–18); Italy (2018); Germany (2015–22); Denmark (2016–23); Local ground forces Syrian Democratic Forces: YPG; YPJ; Syriac Military Council; Al-Sanadid Forces; Euphrates Volcano (2014–15); (Syrian opposition) Revolutionary Commando Army; Limited involvement Iraqi Kurdistan: Peshmerga	Islamic State of Iraq and the Levant al-Qaeda: al-Nusra Front (2014–17); Khorasan group; Tahrir al-Sham (2017–2025); Jaysh al-Sunna (2015–17); Rouse the Believers Operations Room (2018–2020); Guardians of Religion Organization; Jund al-Aqsa (2014–17); Turkistan Islamic Party Ahrar al-Sham (Nov. 2014 airstrikes, intentionality disputed)	Ba'athist Syria (limited 2017–2018 strikes); Iran (limited aircraft shoot downs); Supported by: Russia; North Korea; Islamic Resistance in Iraq; Popular Mobilization Forces; Kata'ib Hezbollah (limited 2019 and 2021 strikes)

Commanders and leaders
(United States) Joe Biden (until 20 January 2025) (United States) Donald Trump (until 20 January 2021, since 20 Jan 2025) (United States) Barack Obama (until 20 January 2017) (United States) Chuck Hagel (until 2015) (United States) Ashton Carter (until 2017) (United States) James Mattis (until 2019) (United States) Patrick M. Shanahan (until 23 June 2019) (United States) Mark Esper (until 9 November 2020) (United States) Lloyd Austin (since 22 January 2021) (Denmark) Lars Løkke Rasmussen (Denmark) Helle Thorning-Schmidt (Netherlands) Mark Rutte (United Kingdom) Rishi Sunak (since 25 October 2022) (United Kingdom) Liz Truss (6 September 2022 – 25 October 2022) (United Kingdom) Boris Johnson (24 July 2019 – 6 September 2022) (United Kingdom) Theresa May (13 July 2016 – 24 July 2019) (United Kingdom) David Cameron (until 13 July 2016) (United Kingdom) Stephen Hillier (Australia) Tony Abbott (Australia) Malcolm Turnbull (Australia) Trevor Jones (Australia) David Johnston (France) Emmanuel Macron (since 14 May 2017) (France) François Hollande (until 14 May 2017) (France) Jean-Yves Le Drian (France) Pierre de Villiers (Germany) Angela Merkel (Germany) Annegret Kramp-Karrenbauer (Germany) Volker Wieker (Jordan) King Abdullah II (Jordan) Abdullah Ensour (Saudi Arabia) King Salman (Saudi Arabia) King Abdullah Al Saud (Died 2015) (Saudi Arabia) Mohammad bin Salman Al Saud (Morocco) King Mohammed VI (Morocco) Abdelilah Benkirane (Morocco) Bouchaib Arroub (United Arab Emirates) Khalifa Al Nahyan (Bahrain) Hamad bin Isa Al Khalifa (Qatar) Tamim Al Thani (Qatar) Hamad bin Ali Al Attiyah (Democratic Autonomous Administration of North and East Syria) Salih Muslim Muhammad (Kurdistan Region) Masoud Barzani (Canada) Stephen Harper (until November 2015) (Canada) Justin Trudeau (until February 2016) (Canada) Thomas J. Lawson (until February 2016) (Canada) Yvan Blondin (until February 2016)	(Islamic State) Abu Bakr al-Baghdadi † (Leader) (Islamic State) Abu Alaa Afri † (Deputy Leader of ISIL) Abu Jaber Sheikh (Emir of Tahrir al-Sham, 2017–present); Ahmed al-Sharaa (Leader of the al-Nusra Front); Abu Humam al-Shami (al-Nusra Military Chief) Abu Jaber Sheikh (2014–2015) Abu Yahia al-Hamawi (2015–2017)	(Ba'athist Syria) Bashar al-Assad (President of Syria)

Strength
Coalition forces: Coalition forces-air United States: USS George H.W. Bush carrier strike group; USS Carl Vinson carrier strike group (From 16 Oct to Present); USS Arleigh Burke; USS Philippine Sea; Tomahawk missiles; Fighter aircraft; F-22 Raptor; F-16 Fighting Falcon; F-15 Eagle; FA-18 Super Hornet; Bomber aircraft; B-1 Lancer; Ground-attack aircraft; A-10 Thunderbolt; Electronic warfare aircraft; EA-18G Growler; EA-6B Prowler; Drones; MQ-1 Predator; MQ-9 Reaper; Bahrain: 2 F-16s; France: 1 aircraft carrier Charles de Gaulle; 24 Rafale fighters; 8 Super-Étendard fighters; 3 Mirage 2000D fighters; 3 Mirage 2000N fighters; 1 Atlantique 2 maritime patrol aircraft; Germany: 1200 troops; 6 Panavia Tornado RECCE jets; 1 Airbus A310 MRTT for in-flight refueling; Jordan: 20 F-16s; Qatar: 2 Mirage 2000s; Saudi Arabia: 4 F-15s; United Arab Emirates: 4 F-16s; United Kingdom: 3 Surface Warships; 2 Submarines; 15 Eurofighter Typhoons; 9 Panavia Tornado Aircraft; 10 MQ-9 Reaper Drones; 1 ISR Aircraft; 3 RC-135; MQ-9 Reaper; Denmark: 7 F-16s in Iraq and Syria (pulled out); 1 frigate; Netherlands: 4 F-16s; Coalition forces-ground Iraqi Kurdistan: 152 Peshmerga soldiers; Unknown amount of artillery; United States: 4,000 Special Forces and Rangers (in September 2017); 450 Marines with 18 artillery pieces; France: ~200 special forces; Local forces YPG: 65,000; Free Syrian Army: 60,000 (May 2015 estimate)	Islamic State of Iraq and the Levant: Around 100,000 fighters (according to Iraqi Kurdistan Chief of Staff); 3 MiG-21 or MiG-23 aircraft; At least a few hundred tanks; 2 drones; al-Qaeda: Tahrir al-Sham: 31,000+ (2017) 7-12,000 (2018); Khorasan: 50; Jund al-Aqsa: 2,100; Ahrar al-Sham: 26,000–30,000+	Syrian Arab Republic: 180,000 soldiers

Casualties and losses
United States: 8 servicemen killed (5 non-hostile) 2 government contractors killed 1 F-16 crashed 1 V-22 Osprey crashed 2 drones lost Jordan: 1 serviceman executed 1 F-16 crashed United Kingdom: 1 serviceman killed (non hostile); 2 SAS operators wounded	Islamic State of Iraq and the Levant: At least 9,158 killed (per SOHR) al-Qaeda: 349 killed (per SOHR); ~50 killed (per SOHR); Jaysh al-Sunna: 10 killed (per SOHR) Ahrar al-Sham: 3 killed (per SOHR)	Syrian Arab Republic: 169 soldiers and militiamen killed (per SOHR); 215 Russian mercenaries killed 4 tanks destroyed 11+ aircraft destroyed 5 SAM batteries destroyed (Iran) 2 armed drones shot down
- 3,833 civilians killed by Coalition airstrikes in Syria (Per Syrian Observatory for Human Rights); 5,900+ civilians killed by ISIL in Syria; Over 420,000 civilians displaced or fled to other countries
- Number of militants killed possibly higher, due to them covering up their losses.

The United States intervention in Syria is the United States-led support of Syrian opposition and Rojava during the course of the Syrian civil war and active military involvement led by the United States and its allies – the militaries of the United Kingdom, France, Jordan, Turkey, Canada, Australia and more – against the Islamic State of Iraq and the Levant (ISIL) and al-Nusra Front since 2014. Since early 2017, the U.S. and other Coalition partners have also targeted the Ba'athist government in Syria and its allies via airstrikes and aircraft shoot-downs.

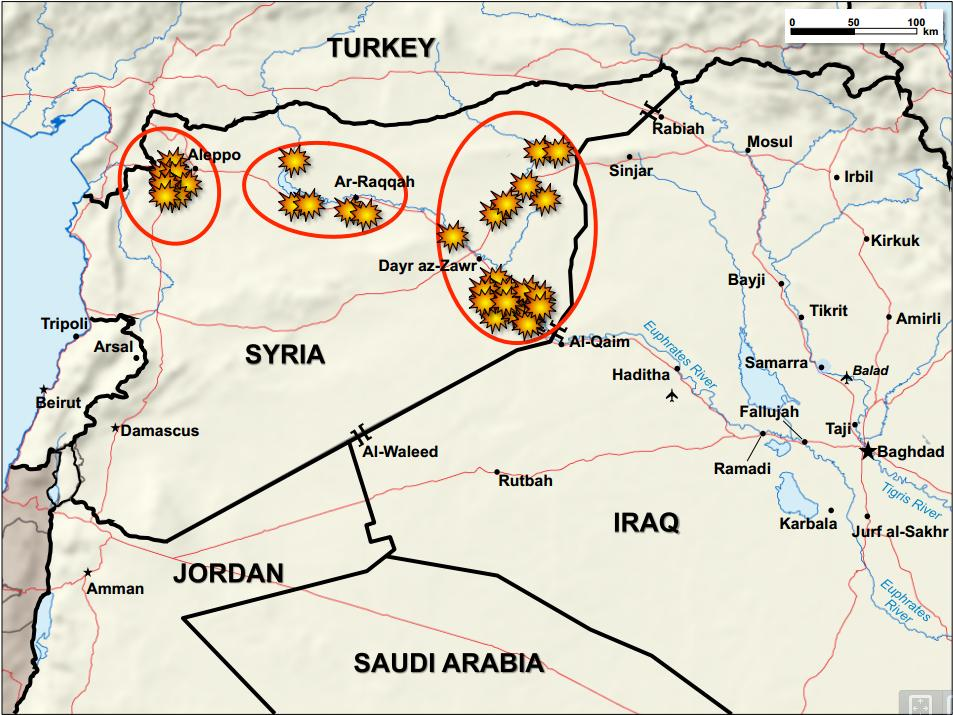
Map of the first round of U.S. and coalition strikes in Syria

== 2014 ==
=== September 2014: Airstrikes begin ===
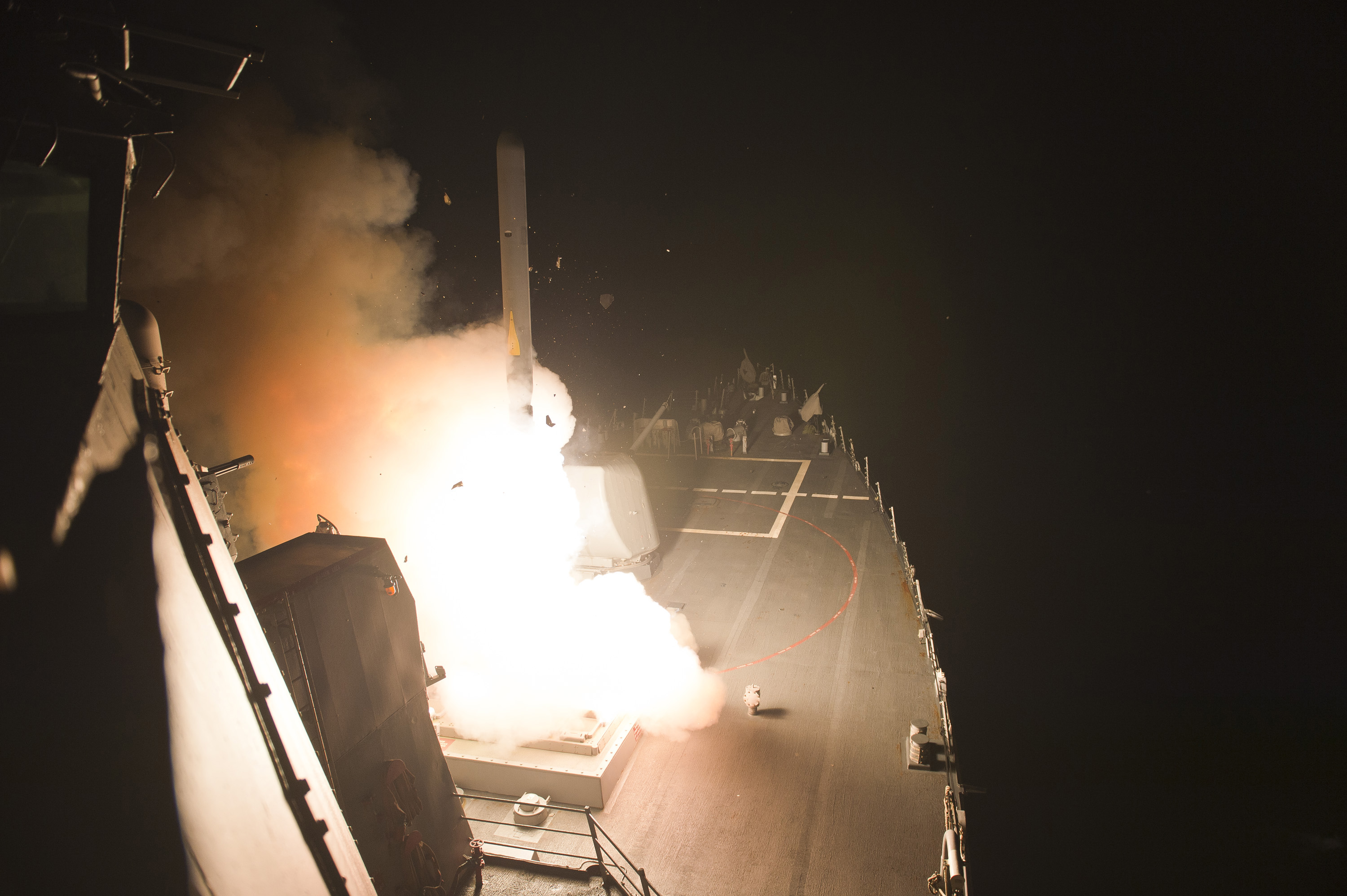
A Tomahawk cruise missile launching from USS Arleigh Burke to strike ISIL targets in Syria on 23 September

On 22 September 2014, Pentagon Press Secretary Rear Admiral John Kirby confirmed that the United States and partner nations had undertaken airstrikes in Syria using fighters, bombers, and Tomahawk missiles in strikes authorized by President Barack Obama. The initial strikes were coordinated by United States Central Command (USCENTCOM) with Arab partner forces from Bahrain, Jordan, Qatar, Saudi Arabia, and the United Arab Emirates (UAE) conducting or supporting airstrikes. The overnight strikes targeted about 20 Islamic State of Iraq and the Levant (ISIL) targets, including headquarters buildings. Sources in Syria claimed that among the target locations was Brigade 93, a Syrian army base that ISIL militants had recently captured, and targets in the ISIL-held towns of Tabqa and Tell Abyad in Raqqa Governorate. The U.S. also targeted the al-Qaeda-affiliated al-Nusra Front and the Khorasan group in Syria's Aleppo and Idlib provinces. At least 70 Islamic State fighters, 50 fighters affiliated with al-Qaeda, and eight civilians were killed overnight by the airstrikes, according to the Syrian Observatory for Human Rights (SOHR) conflict monitor, while eight strikes were launched against the Khorasan group.

U.S. F-22 Raptor stealth fighters were reportedly among the U.S. aircraft striking targets in Syria on the first night of the campaign, carrying out their first ever combat missions since entering service in 2005. Syrian military radar was "passive" during the first air strikes, making no known attempt to counter coalition aircraft. The U.S. had deployed HARM missiles as a precaution, as it was uncertain how Syria's air-defense network would react.

A U.S. Air Force fighter jet drops ordnance on an ISIL compound in Raqqa, Syria on 23 September 2014.

On 24 September, the U.S.-led coalition conducted a second round of airstrikes on Islamic State facilities in Syria, targeting ISIL-held oil production facilities the group was using to fund their activities. Some targets were apparently also mobile production facilities which were most likely not refineries. In a third round of airstrikes on ISIL targets on 25 September, Arab partners led the U.S. in strikes against militant-held oil facilities in northeastern Syria. Saudi Arabia and the UAE dropped 80 percent of the bomb tonnage in the third round of strikes, compared to other strikes in which the U.S. led the way. On 26 September, the U.S. carried out a fourth round of airstrikes on ISIL targets in eastern Syria, targeting ISIL heavy equipment and destroying four battle tanks in Deir ez-Zor Governorate.

In a fifth round of airstrikes on 27 September, the U.S. led strikes along with Saudi Arabia, Jordan and the UAE against ISIL forces in the Kobanî Canton of Syrian Kurdistan, destroying two armored vehicles and an unknown number of fighters. The area was under siege by ISIL militants, with the fighting forcing over 100,000 Syrian Kurds to flee across the border to Turkey.

On 28 and 29 September, the U.S. carried out two rounds of strikes against ISIL positions across four provinces. Among the facilities targeted was the entrance to the largest gas plant in Syria, in Deir ez-Zor Governorate, and ISIL training camps and vehicles near an ISIL-controlled grain silo in Manbij.

=== October 2014 ===
In an eighth round of airstrikes on 1 October, the U.S.-led coalition conducted daytime strikes against Islamic State forces besieging the primarily Kurdish town of Kobanî. The strikes were in support of the Free Syrian Army (FSA) and the Kurdish People's Protection Units (YPG), who were defending the city. On 2 October, the U.S. and the UAE led a ninth round of strikes against ISIL forces across Syria, destroying an ISIL checkpoint near Kobanî, damaging a tank north of the Sinjar Mountain area, destroying a tank west of Raqqa, and destroying several ISIL facilities east of Aleppo.

In a tenth round of airstrikes on 3 October, the U.S., assisted by Saudi Arabia and the UAE, struck ISIL forces in northern and eastern Syria, destroying an ISIL garrison south of al-Hasakah, destroying two tanks southeast of Deir ez-Zor and two modular oil refineries and a training camp south of Raqqa, and striking an ISIL building northeast of Aleppo.

The U.S. led an 11th round of airstrikes on 4 October, alongside Jordan, Saudi Arabia, and the UAE, against ISIL forces across Syria. The coalition carried out nine strikes, destroying an ISIL infantry unit, armored personnel carrier (APC), and a vehicle south of Kobanî. They also destroyed a tank and a vehicle southeast of Deir ez-Zor, damaged the Tabqa airfield and destroyed an artillery piece near Raqqa, as well as an ISIL depot and logistics complex south of al-Hasakah. In a 12th round of strikes on 5 October, the U.S. carried out three airstrikes against ISIL forces in central and eastern Syria, destroying an ISIL bulldozer, two ISIL tanks and another vehicle northwest of Mayadin, along with six firing positions and a large ISIL unit northwest of Raqqa.

On 6 October, the U.S. carried out a 13th round of strikes, destroying an ISIL tank near Tabqa airfield west of Raqqa, two fighting positions south of Kobanî, and a tank southeast of Deir ez-Zor. On 7 October, in a 14th round of strikes, the U.S., Saudi Arabia and the UAE, carried out nine strikes damaging multiple ISIL-controlled buildings west of al-Hasakah, damaging a staging area and IED production facility northeast of Deir ez-Zor, destroying three armed vehicles, damaging one armed vehicle, destroying a vehicle carrying anti-aircraft artillery, destroying an ISIL tank, and an ISIL unit in and around Kobanî, and killing a small group of fighters southwest of Rabiyah.

On 8 October, the U.S. led a 15th round of nine airstrikes along with the UAE, destroying an armored personnel carrier, four armed vehicles, an artillery piece, and damaged another armed vehicle in and around Kobanî, striking an ISIL training camp and fighters northwest of Raqqa, and destroying a tank northwest of Deir ez-Zor.

In a 16th round of airstrikes in Syria on 9 October, the U.S. carried out nine airstrikes in the areas in and around the besieged border town of Kobanî. The U.S. carried out six airstrikes south of Kobanî that destroyed two ISIL-held buildings, one tank and one heavy machine gun along, a fighting position along with one large and two small ISIL units. North of Kobanî, the U.S. struck two small ISIL units and destroyed two ISIL-held buildings.

On 10 October, the U.S. led a 17th round of airstrikes along with Saudi Arabia and the UAE, carrying out nine strikes that destroyed two ISIL training facilities, three vehicles, damaging a tank and striking two ISIL units in and around Kobanî. The strikes also destroyed an armored vehicle staging facility east of Deir ez-Zor and struck a small ISIL unit northeast of al-Hasakah.

In an 18th round of airstrikes in Syria on 11 October, the U.S. carried out six airstrikes in and around Kobanî. The U.S. carried out four strikes north of Kobanî striking a fighting position, damaging a command and control facility, destroying a staging building, and striking two small ISIL units. South of Kobanî, two airstrikes destroyed three trucks.

On 12 October, the U.S. led a 19th round of airstrikes along with Saudi Arabia and the United Arab Emirates, carrying out four strikes – three in Kobanî, destroying a fighting position and a staging area, and one strike northwest of Raqqa, destroying an armored vehicle compound. Also on 12 October, the U.S. announced that the Turkish government had approved the use of Turkish military bases by Coalition forces fighting ISIL in Syria and Iraq. These installations included key bases only 160 km (100 mi) from the Syrian border and important U.S. military bases in Turkey such as the Incirlik Air Base. Despite the announcement of Turkish government approval, on 13 October, Turkish officials publicly denied that any agreement had been made over Coalition use of Turkish airbases, including Incirlik.

In a 20th round of airstrikes in Syria on 13 October, the U.S. and Saudi Arabia carried out eight airstrikes against ISIL forces. Seven of the strikes were in and around Kobanî, striking a large ISIL unit, two small units; damaging one staging location and destroying another, destroying a heavy-machine-gun firing position, destroying three buildings, and damaging two others. One other strike northwest of Raqqa struck an ISIL garrison.

On 14 October, the U.S. and Saudi Arabia carried out the 21st round and the largest set of strikes against ISIL in Syria since the beginning of the intervention, with 21 strikes against targets in and around Kobanî, and an additional strike near Deir ez-Zor. According to the Department of Defense, the strikes were designed to interdict ISIL reinforcements and resupply zones and prevent ISIL from massing combat power on the Kurdish-held portions of Kobanî. The strikes destroyed two staging locations and damaged another, destroyed one ISIL building and damaged two others, damaged three ISIL compounds, destroyed one truck, one armed vehicle, and one other vehicle near Kobanî in support of Kurdish forces resisting the |siege of the town. In addition to those targets, the airstrikes struck seven staging areas, two mortar positions, three ISIL occupied buildings, and an artillery storage facility. An additional strike near Deir ez-Zor struck a modular oil refinery.

In a 22nd round of airstrikes on 15 October, the U.S. carried out 18 strikes against ISIL targets in and around Kobanî. The strikes destroyed multiple fighting positions and also successfully struck sixteen ISIL-occupied buildings.

On 16 October, the U.S. carried out a 23rd round of airstrikes with 14 airstrikes against ISIL targets in and around Kobanî striking 19 ISIL-controlled buildings, two command posts, three fighting positions, three sniper positions, one staging location, and one heavy machine gun position.

In a 24th round of airstrikes on 17 October, the U.S. carried out seven airstrikes against ISIL targets in and around Kobanî and in north-eastern Syria. Six airstrikes took place near Kobanî, striking three ISIL-controlled buildings; they also destroyed two fighting positions, suppressed three fighting positions, and destroyed two vehicles. One other airstrike near Al-Shaddadi struck ISIL-controlled oil collection equipment, including several petroleum, oil, and lubricants tanks, and a pump station.

On 20 October, the U.S. carried out a 25th round of airstrikes, with six airstrikes against ISIL targets in and around Kobanî. The strikes destroyed ISIL fighting positions, ISIL mortar positions, a vehicle, and one stray equipment supply bundle from a U.S. airdrop of Kurdish supplies in order to prevent the supplies from being captured.

In a 26th round of airstrikes on 21 October, the U.S. carried out four airstrikes against ISIL targets in and around Kobanî. The strikes destroyed several ISIL fighting positions, an ISIL-controlled building, and a large ISIL unit. The British Royal Air Force began operating over Syria in a surveillance role on the same date, making the UK the first Western country other than the U.S. to operate in both Iraq and Syria simultaneously.

On 22 October, the U.S. carried out a 27th round of airstrikes with six airstrikes against ISIL targets in and around Kobanî. The strikes destroyed several ISIL fighting positions, two ISIL vehicles, an ISIL-controlled building and an ISIL logistical center.

In a 28th round of airstrikes on 23 October, the U.S. carried out six airstrikes in and around Kobanî and near Deir ez-Zor. Four strikes destroyed several ISIL fighting positions, an ISIL vehicle, and an ISIL command and control center near Kobanî. Two strikes east of Deir ez-Zor destroyed several ISIL oil storage tanks.

On 24 October, the U.S. carried out a 29th round of airstrikes with six airstrikes against ISIL targets in and around Kobanî. The strikes destroyed an ISIL vehicle and struck three ISIL units.

In a 30th round of airstrikes on 25 October, the U.S. carried out one strike near Kobanî, destroying an ISIL artillery piece.

On 26 October, the U.S. carried out its 31st round of airstrikes with five airstrikes against ISIL targets near Kobanî, destroying seven ISIL vehicles and an ISIL-controlled building.

In a 32nd round of airstrikes on 27 October, the U.S. carried out four strikes near Kobanî, destroying five ISIL vehicles and an ISIL-occupied building.

On 28 October, the U.S. carried out its 33rd round of airstrikes, with four airstrikes conducted against ISIL targets near Kobanî, destroying four ISIL fighting positions and a small ISIL unit.

In a 34th round of airstrikes on 29 October, the U.S. carried out eight airstrikes in and around Kobanî. The strikes destroyed five ISIL fighting positions, a small ISIL unit, six ISIL vehicles, an ISIL-controlled building, and an ISIL command and control node.

On 30 October, the U.S. carried out a 35th round of airstrikes, with 12 airstrikes against ISIL targets in and around Kobanî, and against targets near Deir ez-Zor and Raqqa. 10 strikes near Kobanî struck two small ISIL units, destroyed seven ISIL fighting positions, and five ISIL-controlled buildings. One strike near Deir ez-Zor damaged an ISIL headquarters building while another strike near Raqqa damaged an ISIL security building.

In a 36th round of airstrikes on 31 October, the U.S. carried out four airstrikes in and around Kobanî, damaging four ISIL fighting positions and an ISIL controlled building.

=== Naming of Operation Inherent Resolve ===
Unlike previous U.S. combat operations, no name had been given to the American-led anti-ISIL intervention in Syria and Iraq until it was announced in mid-October 2014 that the operational name would be Inherent Resolve. The decision to keep the conflict nameless until then drew considerable media criticism.

=== November 2014 ===
On 1 November, the U.S. carried out a 37th round of airstrikes with five airstrikes against ISIL targets in and around Kobanî. The strikes suppressed or destroyed nine ISIL fighting positions, and struck one ISIL-controlled building.

In a 38th round of airstrikes on 2 November, the U.S. carried out seven airstrikes in and around Kobanî and near Deir ez-Zor. Five airstrikes in and around Kobanî struck five small ISIL units and destroyed three ISIL vehicles. Two airstrikes southeast of Deir ez-Zor destroyed an ISIL tank and two vehicle shelters.

On 3 November, the U.S. and coalition partners carried out a 39th round of airstrikes in and around Kobanî and near Deir ez-Zor. Four airstrikes in and around Kobanî struck an ISIL fighting position, a small ISIL unit, and destroyed two ISIL-controlled buildings. One airstrike near Deir ez-Zor damaged an ISIL-controlled building.

In a 40th round of airstrikes on 4 and 5 November, the U.S. carried out six airstrikes in and around Kobanî and north of Sinjar just across the Iraq-Syria border. Three airstrikes in and around Kobanî struck a small ISIL unit, two ISIL fighting positions, and an ISIL dump truck that was used in the construction of fighting positions. One airstrike north of Sinjar destroyed an ISIL fighting position, used to launch mortar attacks, and struck a small ISIL unit manning the position. Two additional strikes north of Sinjar struck a small ISIL unit and destroyed an ISIL armored vehicle.

On 6 and 7 November, the U.S. carried out a 41st round of airstrikes in and around Kobanî and near Tell Abyad. Seven strikes in and around Kobanî struck three small ISIL units, seven ISIL fighting positions, and destroyed an ISIL artillery piece. One airstrike near Tell Abyad destroyed an ISIL weapons stockpile.

In a 42nd round of airstrikes between 8 and 10 November, the U.S. carried out 23 airstrikes in and around Kobanî and near Deir ez-Zor. 13 airstrikes conducted in and around Kobanî struck an ISIL vehicle and five small ISIL units, destroyed an ISIL-occupied building used as an ammunition stockpile, an ISIL command and control building, and seven ISIL fighting positions, as well as damaging two ISIL fighting positions. In addition, eight airstrikes southeast of Deir ez-Zor damaged several structures of an ISIL oil collection facility, which was used to trans-load oil for the black market, while two airstrikes east of Deir ez-Zor damaged an ISIL oil collection point.

Between 11 and 12 November, the U.S. carried out a 43rd round of airstrikes with 16 airstrikes in and around Kobanî, near Deir ez-Zor, and near al-Hasakah. 10 airstrikes conducted in and around Kobanî struck eight small ISIL units, damaged three ISIL fighting positions, and destroyed an ISIL logistics facility. Four airstrikes near Deir ez-Zor damaged an ISIL crude oil collection facility, struck a small ISIL unit, and damaged an ISIL vehicle. Two airstrikes near al-Hasakah damaged a crude oil collection point.

In a 44th round of airstrikes between 13 and 14 November, the U.S. carried out 20 airstrikes in and around Kobanî, east of Deir ez-Zor, west of Aleppo, and east of Raqqa. 17 airstrikes conducted in and around Kobanî struck ten ISIL units, destroyed 10 fighting positions, an ISIL controlled building, two ISIL vehicles, and an ISIL motorcycle. One airstrike east of Raqqa destroyed an ISIL training camp and another airstrike east of Deir ez-Zor destroyed an ISIL oil collection point. One other airstrike west of Aleppo struck militants associated with the Khorasan group.

Between 15 and 17 November, the U.S. carried out a 45th round of airstrikes with 11 airstrikes in and around Kobanî and near Deir ez-Zor. Nine airstrikes in and around Kobanî destroyed seven ISIL fighting positions, suppressed an ISIL fighting position, destroyed four ISIL staging areas, and struck one tactical ISIL unit. Two airstrikes near Deir ez-Zor struck an ISIL crude oil collection facility and destroyed one ISIL tank.

In a 46th round of airstrikes between 18 and 19 November, the U.S. carried out seven airstrikes in and around Kobanî, southeast of Al-Hasakah, and near Hazm. Five airstrikes in and around Kobanî destroyed an ISIL fighting position, an ISIL staging area and three ISIL controlled buildings, suppressed two ISIL fighting positions, struck two tactical ISIL units, and a large ISIL unit. One airstrike southeast of Al-Hasakah damaged a crude oil collection point operated by ISIL while another airstrike near Hazm struck and destroyed a storage facility associated with the Khorasan Group.

Between 20 and 21 November, the U.S. and coalition partners carried out a 47th round of airstrikes with seven airstrikes in and around Kobanî and near Raqqa. Six airstrikes in and around Kobanî destroyed four ISIL staging areas, two ISIL-controlled buildings, two ISIL tactical units, and suppressed an ISIL fighting position. One airstrike near Raqqa damaged an ISIL barracks building.

In a 48th round of airstrikes between 22 and 24 November, the U.S. and coalition partners carried out nine airstrikes in and around Kobanî and near Raqqa. Seven airstrikes in and around Kobanî destroyed three ISIL fighting positions along with two ISIL staging areas, damaged an ISIL staging area, and suppressed four ISIL fighting positions. Two strikes near Raqqa struck an ISIL headquarters building.

Between 25 and 26 November, the U.S. carried out a 49th round of airstrikes with 10 airstrikes in and around Kobanî striking an ISIL fighting position, a large ISIL unit, two tactical ISIL units, and destroying four ISIL staging areas and six ISIL fighting positions.

In a 50th round of airstrikes between 27 and 28 November, the U.S. carried out two airstrikes near Kobanî and Aleppo. One airstrike near Kobanî struck an ISIL fighting position and an ISIL staging area while one airstrike near Aleppo struck a tactical ISIL unit.

Between 29 November and 1 December, the U.S. carried out a 51st round of airstrikes with 27 airstrikes in and around Kobanî, near Raqqa, and near Aleppo. 17 airstrikes near Kobanî destroyed two ISIL-occupied buildings, three ISIL tanks, three ISIL fighting positions, an ISIL armored personnel carrier, three ISIL vehicles and two ISIL staging areas. It also struck seven tactical ISIL units, targeted six ISIL fighting positions and damaged an ISIL-controlled building. Nine airstrikes near Raqqa struck an ISIL electronic warfare garrison, an ISIL military garrison, an ISIL headquarters building, an ISIL jamming system, an ISIL tank and 14 ISIL vehicles while one airstrike near Aleppo struck a target associated with the Khorasan Group.

=== December 2014 ===
In a 52nd round of airstrikes between 1 and 3 December, the U.S. carried out 14 airstrikes in and around Kobanî destroying an ISIL vehicle, 17 ISIL fighting positions, an ISIL staging area, and suppressed eight other fighting positions and struck a large ISIL unit.

Between 4 and 8 December, the U.S. and coalition partners carried out a 53rd round of airstrikes with 15 airstrikes in and around Kobanî and near Raqqa. 15 airstrikes in and around Kobanî destroyed four ISIL fighting positions, three ISIL-occupied buildings, two ISIL staging areas, two ISIL tanks, an ISIL motorcycle, a mortar, and struck eight tactical ISIL units along with two ISIL fighting positions. One airstrike near Raqqa struck an ISIL electronic warfare garrison.

In a 54th round of airstrikes between 9 and 10 December, the U.S. carried out seven airstrikes in and around Kobanî, destroying five ISIL fighting positions, striking three ISIL fighting positions, and striking a large ISIL unit. Between 11 and 12 December, the U.S. and coalition partners carried out a 55th round of airstrikes with seven airstrikes in and around Kobanî, near Aleppo, and near Al-Qa'im, Iraq. Five airstrikes in and around Kobanî destroyed five ISIL fighting positions and struck one ISIL fighting position. One airstrike near Aleppo struck five ISIL-occupied buildings while another airstrike near Al-Qa'im on the Syrian border destroyed two ISIL fortifications.

In a 56th round of airstrikes between 13 and 15 December, the U.S. and coalition partners carried out nine airstrikes in and around Kobanî and near Abu Kamal. Eight airstrikes in and around Kobanî destroyed nine ISIL fighting positions, two ISIL-controlled buildings, and two ISIL staging positions as well as striking one ISIL fighting position. One airstrike near Abu Kamal destroyed an ISIL vehicle.

Between 16 and 17 December, the U.S. and coalition partners carried out a 57th round of airstrikes with six airstrikes in and around Kobanî and near Abu Kamal. Five airstrikes in and around Kobanî destroyed an ISIL controlled building, one ISIL staging area, one ISIL bunker, and an ISIL mortar, and struck two ISIL tactical units, two additional buildings, and two ISIL fighting positions. One airstrike near Abu Kamal destroyed an ISIL tactical vehicle.

In a 58th round of airstrikes on 18 December, the U.S. and coalition partners carried out six airstrikes in and around Kobanî destroying seven ISIL fighting positions and an ISIL building, and struck a tactical unit.

On 19 December, the U.S. and coalition partners carried out a 59th round of airstrikes with four strikes in and around Kobanî and near Raqqa. Three airstrikes in and around Kobanî destroyed two ISIL controlled buildings and an ISIL staging area as well as striking two ISIL tactical units. One airstrike near Raqqa damaged an ISIL training compound.

In a 60th round of airstrikes on 20 December, the U.S. and coalition partners carried out five airstrikes in and around Kobanî destroying eight ISIL fighting positions. On 21 December, the Coalition carried out a 61st round of airstrikes with three strikes in and around Kobanî destroying an ISIL staging position and two ISIL fighting positions as well as striking two ISIL fighting positions.

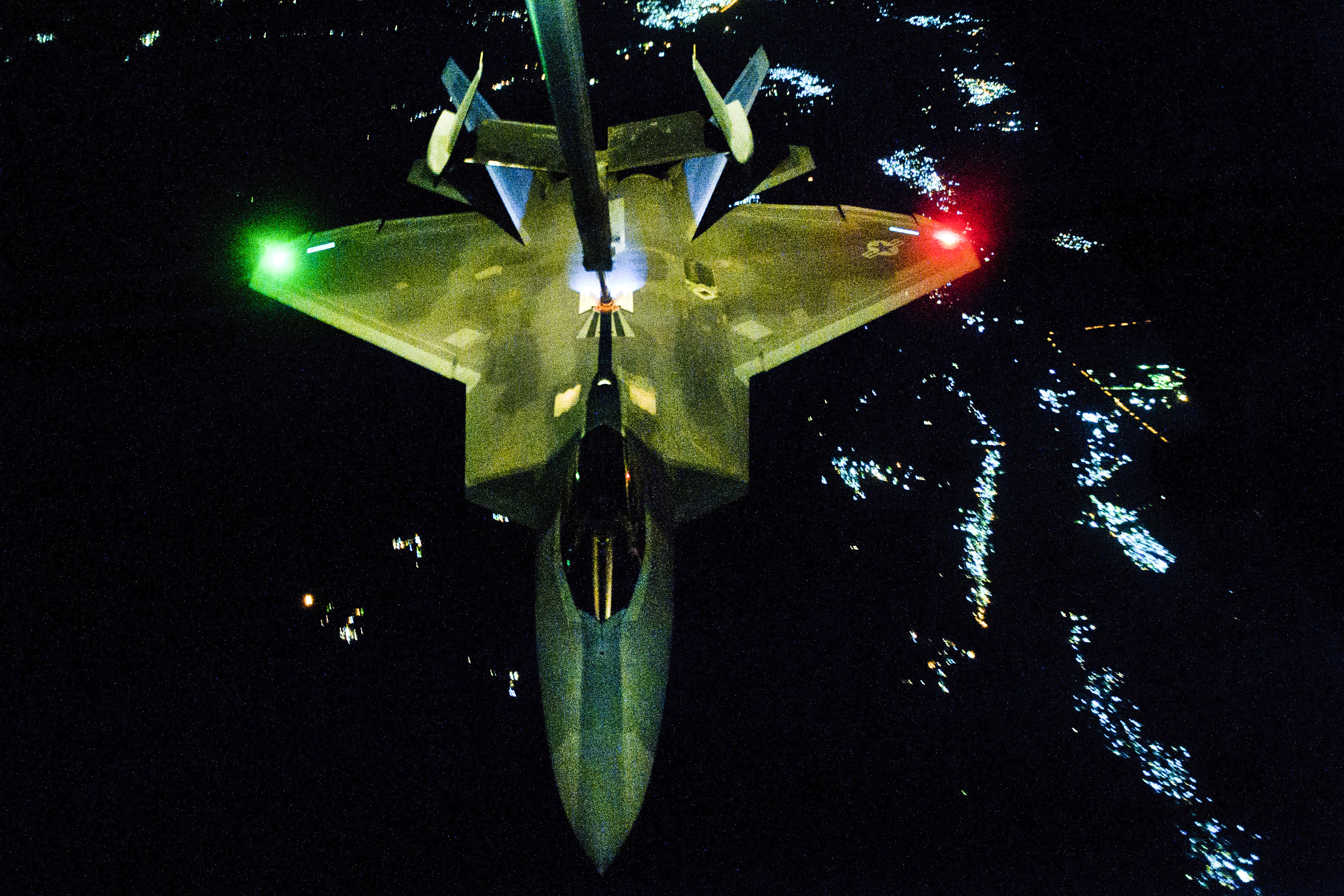
An F-22 Raptor being refueled prior to an airstrike on ISIL targets in Syria

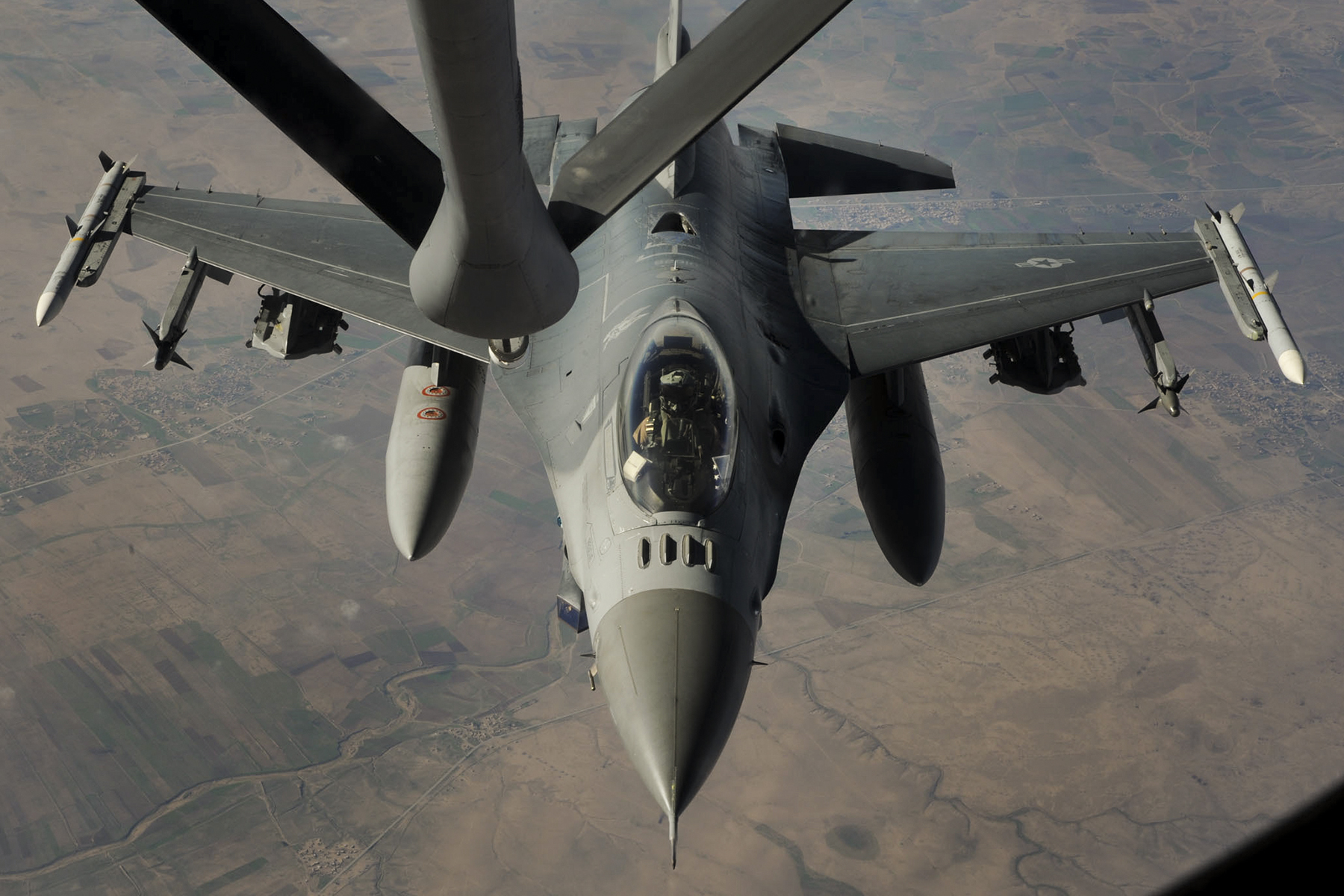
An F-16 Fighting Falcon being refueled after an airstrike on ISIL targets in Syria

In a 62nd round of airstrikes on 22 December, the Coalition carried out 12 airstrikes in and around Kobanî, near Aleppo, near Al-Hasakah, and near Raqqa. Six airstrikes in and around Kobanî destroyed six ISIL fighting positions and struck four ISIL fighting positions and an ISIL tactical unit. Three airstrikes near Aleppo destroyed artillery equipment and struck 10 ISIL buildings; two airstrikes near Al-Hasakah destroyed an ISIL tactical vehicle, two ISIL trucks, a building, and two ISIL storage containers, and one airstrike near Raqqa destroyed an ISIL checkpoint complex.

On 23 December, the Coalition carried out a 63rd round of airstrikes with seven airstrikes in and around Kobanî. Six airstrikes in and around Kobanî destroyed seven ISIL fighting positions, an ISIL building and struck several ISIL fighting positions and one airstrike near Barghooth struck ISIL oil collection equipment.

In a 64th round of airstrikes on 24 December, the Coalition carried out ten airstrikes in and around Kobanî, near Deir ez-Zor, and near Raqqa. Eight airstrikes in and around Kobanî destroyed five ISIL fighting positions, an ISIL building, an ISIL staging position, and struck three ISIL tactical units, an ISIL tactical vehicle and an ISIL fighting position. One airstrike near Deir ez-Zor struck a crude oil collection point and another airstrike near Raqqa struck an ISIL weapons stockpile.

On 25 December, the Coalition carried out a 65th round of airstrikes with 15 airstrikes in and around Kobanî, near Al-Hasakah, and near Raqqa. 13 airstrikes in and around Kobanî destroyed three ISIL buildings, one vehicle, 17 ISIL fighting positions, two ISIL staging positions as well as striking two ISIL fighting positions, three large ISIL units and four ISIL tactical units. One airstrike near Al-Hasakah struck an ISIL drilling tower and destroyed two support vehicles and another airstrike near Raqqa struck an ISIL assembly area.

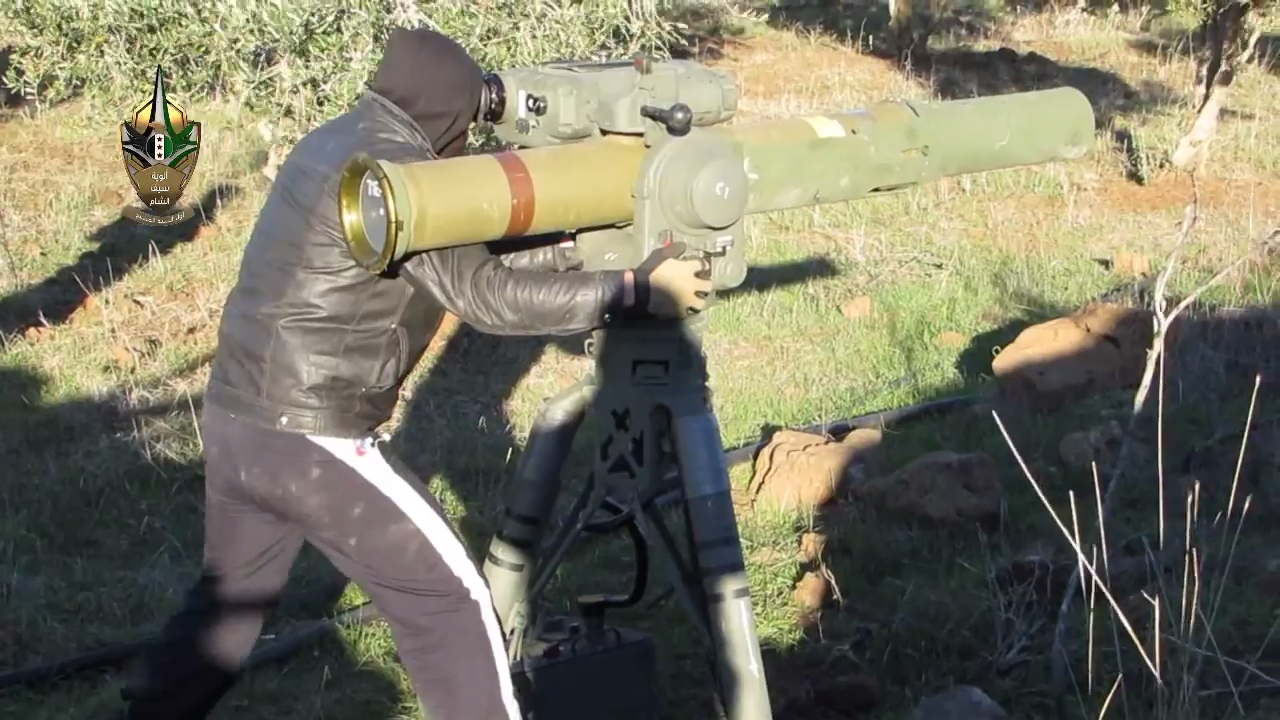
A member of the U.S.-backed Free Syrian Army prepares to launch a BGM-71 TOW at a Syrian Army position in southern Syria, December 2014

In a 66th round of airstrikes on 26 December, the Coalition carried out four airstrikes in and around Kobanî, destroying three ISIL buildings and two ISIL vehicles. On 29 December, the Coalition carried out a 67th round of airstrikes with 12 airstrikes in and around Kobanî, near Deir ez-Zor, and near Raqqa. 10 airstrikes in and around Kobanî destroyed 11 ISIL fighting positions, two ISIL buildings, and an ISIL storage container, and struck an ISIL tactical unit. One airstrike near Deir ez-Zor struck several ISIL-controlled buildings while another airstrike near Raqqa also struck several ISIL-controlled buildings.

In a 68th round of airstrikes on 30 December, the Coalition carried out seven airstrikes in and around Kobanî and near Deir ez-Zor. Six airstrikes in and around Kobanî destroyed three ISIL buildings, damaged one ISIL building, and struck an ISIL tactical unit while one airstrike near Deir ez-Zor destroyed an ISIL shipping container.

On 31 December, the U.S. and coalition partners carried out a 69th round of airstrikes with seven airstrikes in and around Kobanî and near Al-Hasakah. Five airstrikes in and around Kobanî destroyed five ISIL buildings and six ISIL fighting positions while two airstrikes near Al-Hasakah destroyed four oil derricks controlled by ISIL.

== 2015 ==
=== January 2015 ===
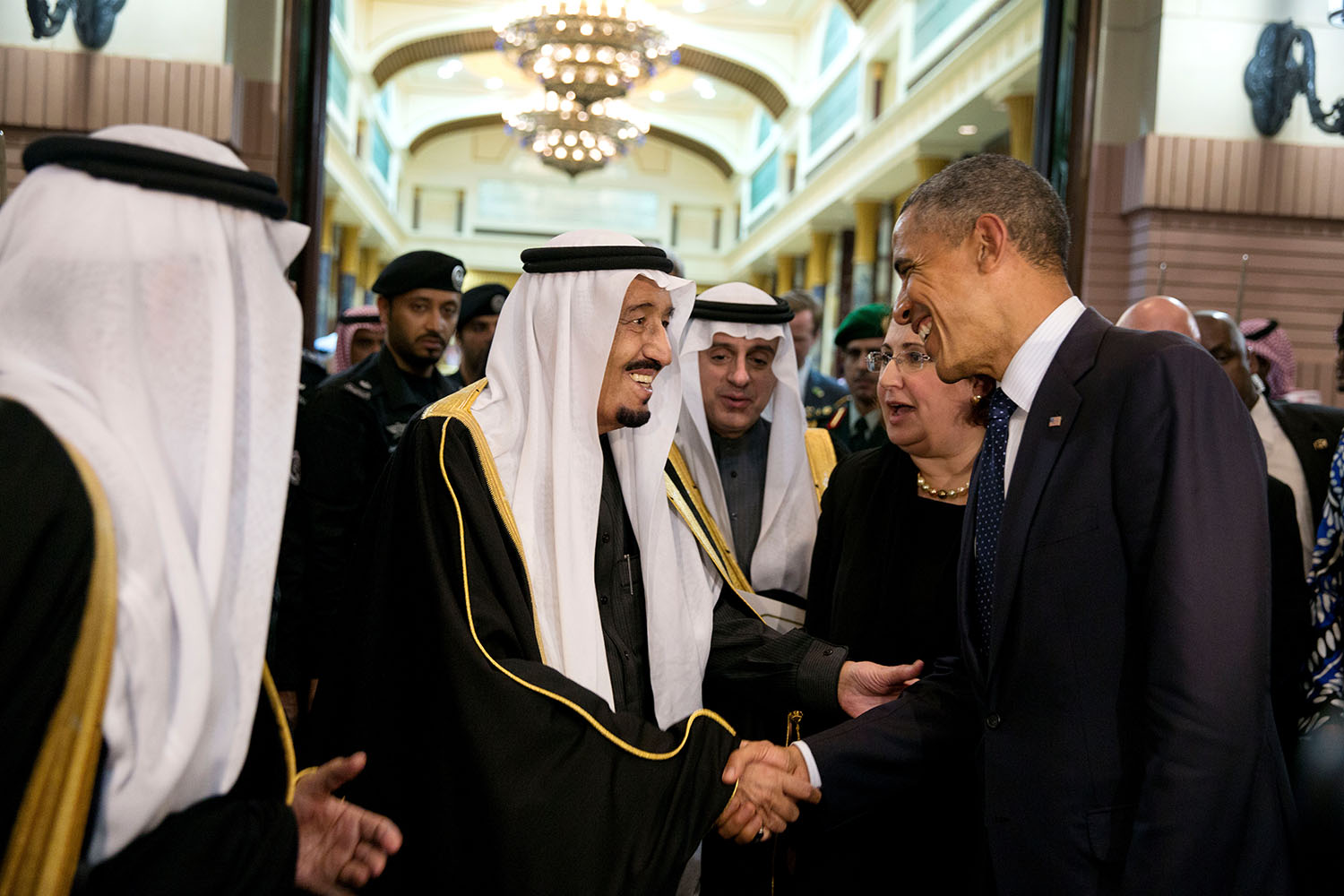
King Salman of Saudi Arabia with President Obama in January 2015. Saudi Arabia was involved in the CIA-led Timber Sycamore covert operation to train and arm Syrian rebels.

In a 70th round of airstrikes on 1 January, the Coalition carried out 17 airstrikes in and around Kobanî, near Deir ez-Zor, and near Raqqa. 13 airstrikes in and around Kobanî destroyed 12 ISIL controlled buildings, four ISIL fighting positions, one ISIL vehicle as well as striking two ISIL tactical units and two large ISIL units. Two airstrikes near Raqqa destroyed five ISIL checkpoints and struck an ISIL staging area, while two airstrikes near Deir ez-Zor destroyed an ISIL fighting position and struck an ISIL shipping container.

=== February 2015: Al-Hasakah offensive ===
On 5 February 2015, Jordan elevated its role in the U.S.-led coalition in Syria, launching one of the largest airstrike campaigns since early January 2015, targeting ISIL militants near Raqqa, the then-de facto ISIL capital, inflicting an unknown number of casualties and damaging ISIL facilities. This was done in retaliation against ISIL's brutal murder of Muath al-Kasasbeh.

On 6 February, a continued round of Coalition airstrikes at Raqqa killed over 30 ISIL militants.

On 21 February, Syrian Kurds launched an offensive to retake ISIL-held territories in the Al-Hasakah Governorate, specifically in the Tell Hamis area, with support from U.S. airstrikes. At least 20 villages were liberated, and 12 militants were killed in the clashes. In response, on 23 February, ISIL abducted 150 Assyrian Christians from villages near Tell Tamer in northeastern Syria, after launching a large offensive in the region.

As a result of ISIL's massive offensive in the west Al-Hasakah Governorate, the U.S.-led Coalition increased the number of airstrikes in the region to 10, on 24 February, in order to halt the ISIL advance. The airstrikes struck nine ISIL tactical units and destroyed two ISIL vehicles.

On 26 February, the number of Assyrian Christians abducted by ISIL from villages in northeastern Syria from 23 to 25 February rose to at least 220, according to the Syrian Observatory for Human Rights (SOHR), a monitoring group based in Britain.

On 27 February, the Kurdish Democratic Union Party and Syrian Observatory for Human Rights reported that Kurdish fighters had recaptured the town of Tell Hamis, along with most of the villages occupied by ISIL in the region. At least 127 ISIL militants were killed in the clashes, along with 30 YPG and allied fighters. One Australian volunteer, who was fighting for the YPG, was also killed. Many of the remaining ISIL militants retreated to Tell Brak, which quickly came under assault from the YPG and allied Arab fighters.

=== March–April 2015: Battle of Sarrin and expanded Canadian and UK efforts ===
On 1 March 2015, YPG fighters, aided by U.S. airstrikes, were able to drive ISIL militants out of Tell Brak, reducing the ISIL occupation in the eastern Jazira Canton to the villages between Tell Brak and Tell Hamis.

On 6 March, it was reported that Abu Humam al-Shami, al-Nusra's military chief, was killed in a U.S. airstrike targeting a meeting of top al-Nusra leaders, at the al-Nusra Front's new headquarters at Salqin.

On 9 March, the U.S. carried out another airstrike on the al-Nusra Front, targeting a military camp near Atimah, close to the Turkish border in the Idlib Governorate. The airstrike left nine militants dead.

On 24 March, Canadian Prime Minister Stephen Harper announced that Canada would be looking to expand Operation Impact to include airstrikes against ISIL in Syria as well.

On 26 March, the United Kingdom Ministry of Defence announced the deployment of around 75 military trainers and headquarter staff to Turkey and other nearby countries in the anti-ISIL coalition, to assist with the U.S.-led training programme in Syria. The programme was set to provide small arms, infantry tactics and medical training to Syrian moderate opposition forces for over three years.

On 30 March, the House of Commons of Canada authorized the extended deployment of its military for one year and to conduct operations related to the war in Syria.

On 8 April, Canada initiated airstrikes in Syria, with two CF-18 fighters bombing a former military installation of the Syrian government that was captured by ISIL, near its headquarters in Raqqa.

=== May 2015: Al-Amr special forces raid ===
On 15 May, after surveillance by British special forces confirmed the presence of a senior ISIL leader named Abu Sayyaf in al-Amr, 1st SFOD-Delta operators from the Joint Special Operations Command based in Iraq conducted an operation to capture him. The operation resulted in his death when he tried to engage U.S. forces in combat and the capture of his wife Umm Sayyaf. The operation also led to the freeing of a Yazidi woman who was held as a slave. About a dozen ISIL fighters were also killed in the raid, two U.S. officials said. The SOHR reported that an additional 19 ISIL fighters were killed in the U.S. airstrikes that accompanied the raid. One official said that ISIL Forces fired at the U.S. aircraft, and there was reportedly hand-to-hand combat during the raid. UH-60 Black Hawk and V-22 Osprey helicopters were used to conduct the raid, and Umm Sayyaf was held by U.S. forces in Iraq.

CNN reported that a senior U.S. military official revealed that in May 2015, U.S. special operations forces came "tantalisingly close" to capturing or killing ISIL leader Abu Bakr al-Baghdadi in Raqqa, but failed to do so because classified information was leaked to the news media.

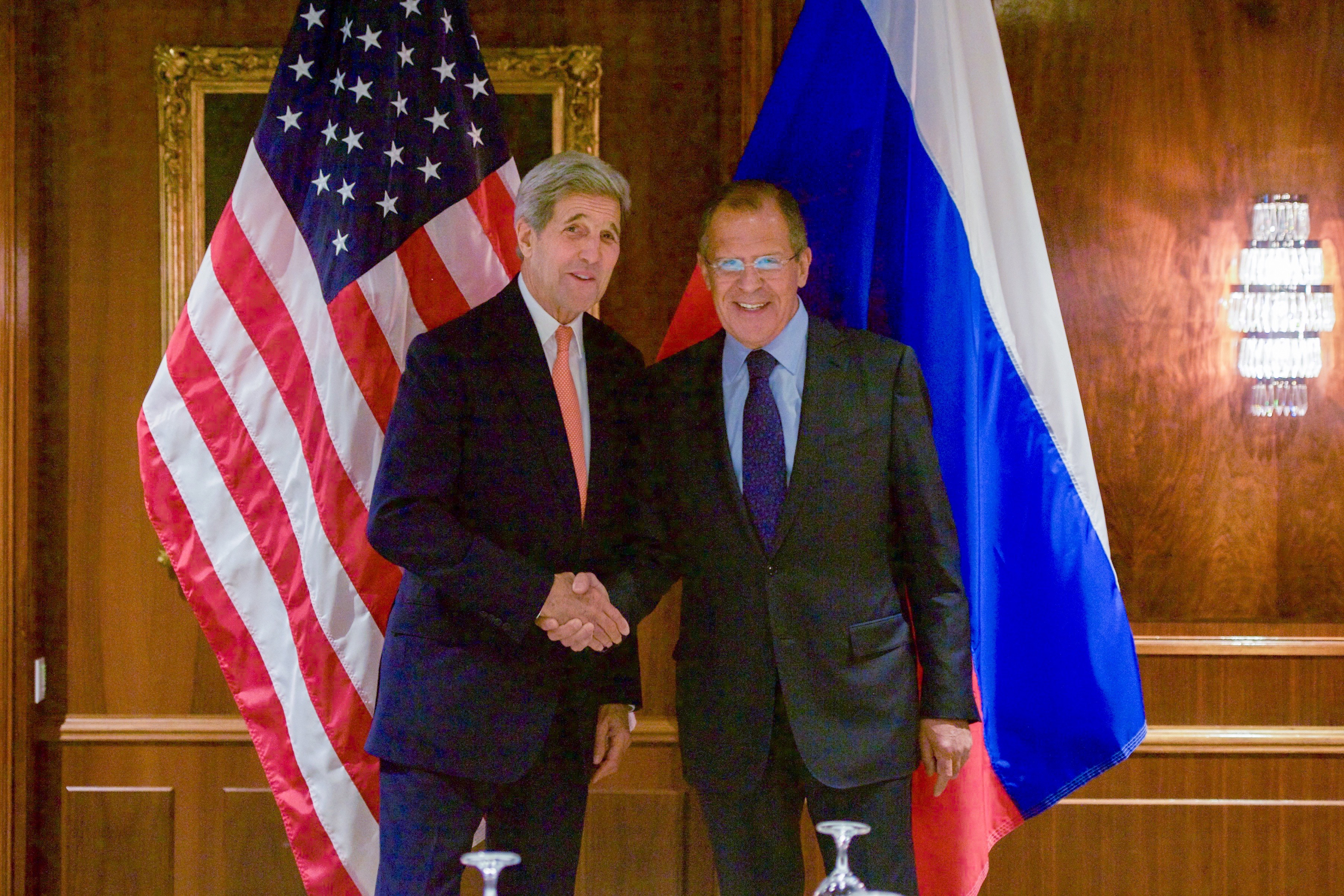
Secretary of State John Kerry with Russian Foreign Minister Sergey Lavrov, before a bilateral meeting focused on Syria, 2015

Coalition air support was decisive in the YPG victory over ISIL in the May 2015 Western al-Hasakah offensive.

=== June–July 2015 ===
U.S. air support, particularly from the 9th Bomb Squadron, was decisive in the YPG victory over ISIL in the Second Battle of Sarrin. Coalition air support was also decisive in the YPG/FSA victory over ISIL in the Tell Abyad offensive.

Following a 20 July suicide bombing in the Şanlıurfa Province of Turkey, believed to have been carried out by ISIL militants, as well as an ISIL cross-border attack that killed a Turkish serviceman on 23 July, Turkish armour and aircraft struck ISIL targets in cross-border engagements in northern Syria. Turkey also agreed to let the United States use the USAF Incirlik Air Base for strikes against ISIL.

=== August–October 2015: UK drone strike and Canada ceases airstrikes ===
On 21 August, three Islamic State fighters, two of United Kingdom nationality, were targeted and killed in Raqqa by a British Royal Air Force MQ-9 Reaper strike. Prime Minister David Cameron gave a statement to Parliament that one of the British nationals targeted had been plotting attacks in the UK. Another British national was killed in a separate air strike by U.S. forces in Raqqa on 24 August.

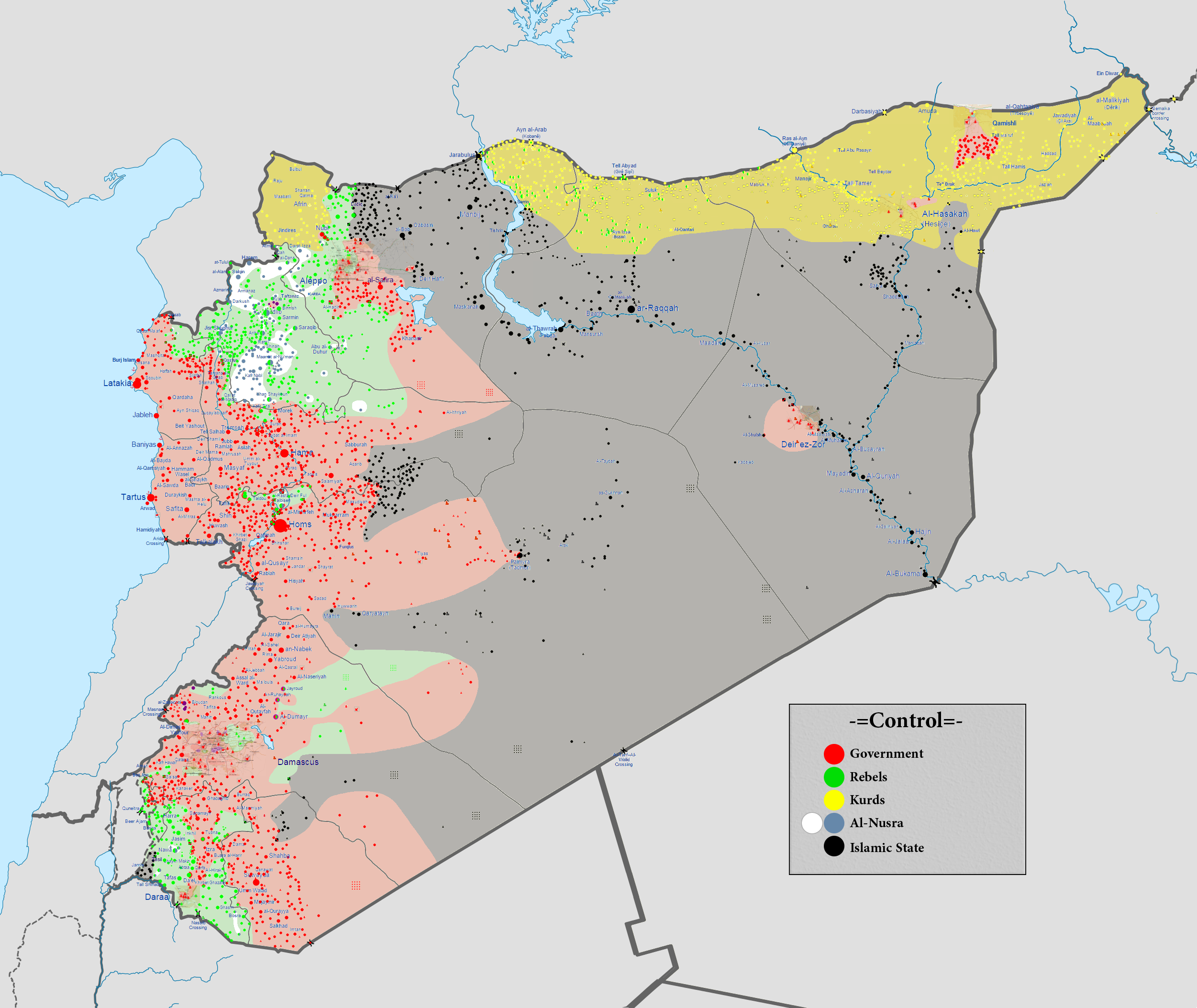
Military situation in November 2015

In October 2015, 50 U.S. special forces operators were deployed to northern Syria to help train and coordinate anti-ISIL forces in the region.

The introduction of Russian aircraft and ship based cruise missiles in support of the Syrian Government to Syrian airspace created new threats to the U.S.-led coalition. Discussions were held to deconflict Syrian airspace.

On 10 October, the state-run Syrian Arab News Agency reported claims that two U.S. F-16 jets had "violated Syrian airspace" and bombed two electricity power plants in al-Rudwaniya, east Aleppo, "in breach of international law".

On 20 October, Canada's Prime Minister-elect Justin Trudeau informed Barack Obama by phone of Canada's intention to pull out of bombing raids in Syria. Canada would remain a coalition partner but will stop strikes.

=== November–December 2015: French retaliation and the UK officially begins airstrikes ===
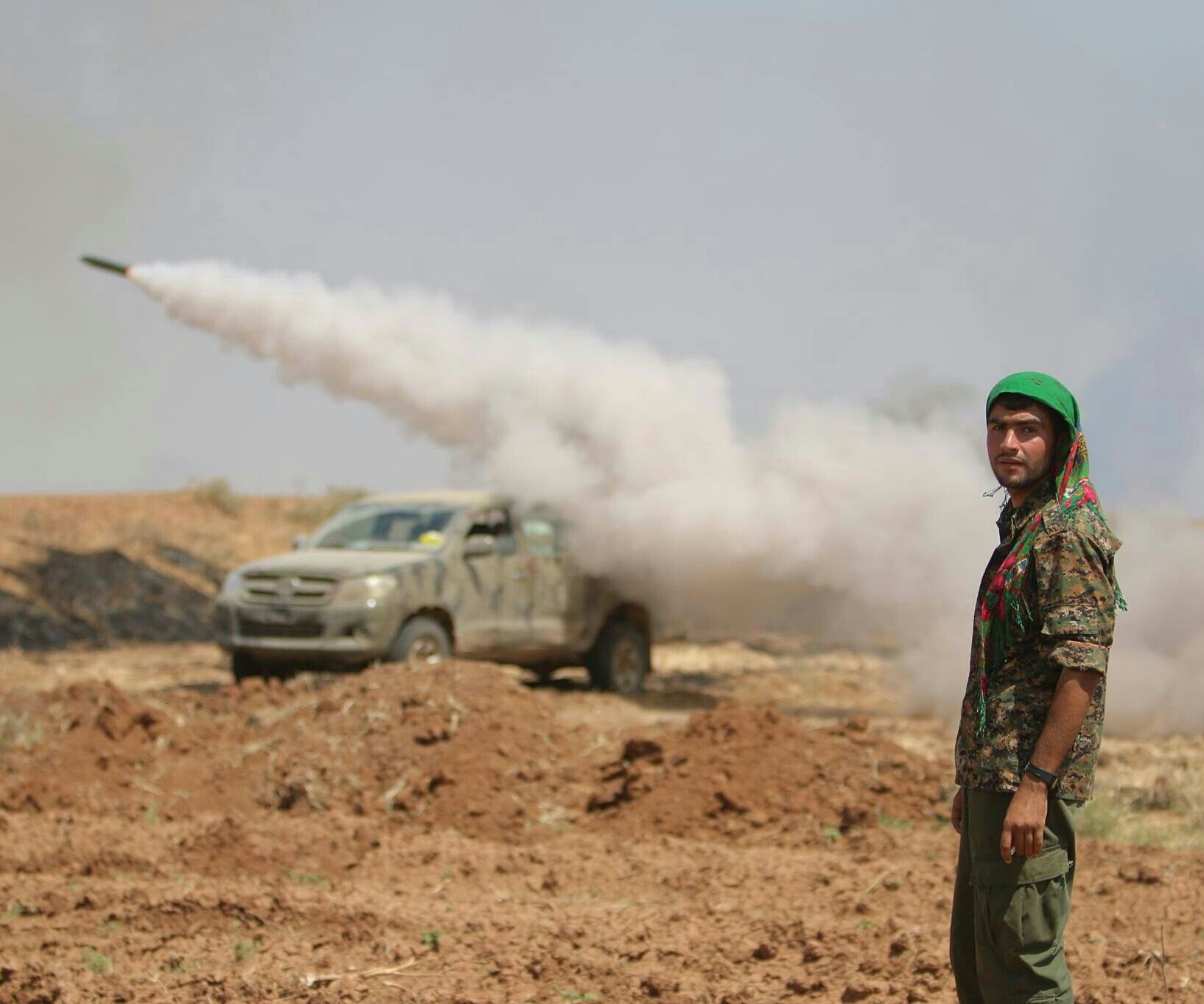
U.S.-backed YPG fighters in November 2015

After deadly terror attacks in Paris conducted by jihadists, French President Francois Hollande sent France's only aircraft carrier, the Charles de Gaulle, with its 26 fighters to intensify air strikes.

On 27 November, SANA claimed that the coalition targeted water pumping stations in al-Khafsah area, east of Aleppo, causing them to go out of service. According to Bellingcat's investigation, however, it was a Russian MoD bombing.

On 2 December, the UK parliament voted 397–223 in favour of airstrikes in Syria. Within hours, RAF Tornado jets carried out their first air strikes, targeting the al-Omar oil fields near Deir ez-Zor in eastern Syria, which were under ISIL control.

On 6 December, a Syrian Arab Army base at Deir ez-Zor was struck, killing at least one Syrian Arab Army soldier, with reports circulating that as many as four were killed, 13 wounded and two tanks destroyed. Syria accused the U.S. of conducting the strike; however, U.S. officials denied this, stating instead that the bombing was a mistake by Russians. After the airstrikes, the SAA reported that ISIL forces began to attack the base.

== 2016 ==
=== March–April 2016: Continued special forces operations ===
On 4 March, a U.S.-led Coalition airstrike targeted Omar al-Shishani, ISIL's top field commander, who was travelling in a convoy near al-Shaddadi in northeastern Syria. The strike injured him, and there were reports that he died from his injuries. However, this proved to be incorrect and he was actually killed later in an airstrike in Iraq in July 2016. Also on 4 March, 100 ISIL militants assaulted Peshmerga lines in Syria; U.S. Navy SEAL Charles Keating IV helped the Peshmerga to repel the attack. As ISIL fighters sent a car bomb towards him, Keating led a team to counterattack with sniper and rocket fire. For his actions during the battle, he was posthumously awarded the Silver Star.

On 24 March, U.S. special operations forces conducted an operation with the intent of capturing Abd al-Rahman Mustafa al-Qaduli in Syria. Al-Qaduli, then the 6th most wanted terrorist in the world and, according to analysts, the then-second-in-command of ISIL, acting as the group's finance minister and was involved in external plots; he also temporarily commanded ISIL after a commander was injured. U.S. Special forces inserted by helicopter and laid in wait to intercept his vehicle; the operators attempted to capture him but the situation escalated and, at the last moment, they decided to fire on the vehicle instead, killing al-Qaduli and 3 other militants.

On 25 April, it was reported that U.S. President Barack Obama authorized the deployment of an additional 250 special operations soldiers to Syria. In the following weeks, they are to join the 50 that are already in the country; their main aim is to advise, assist and expand the ongoing effort to bring more Syrian Arab fighters into units the U.S. supports in northern Syria to combat ISIL.

=== May 2016 ===
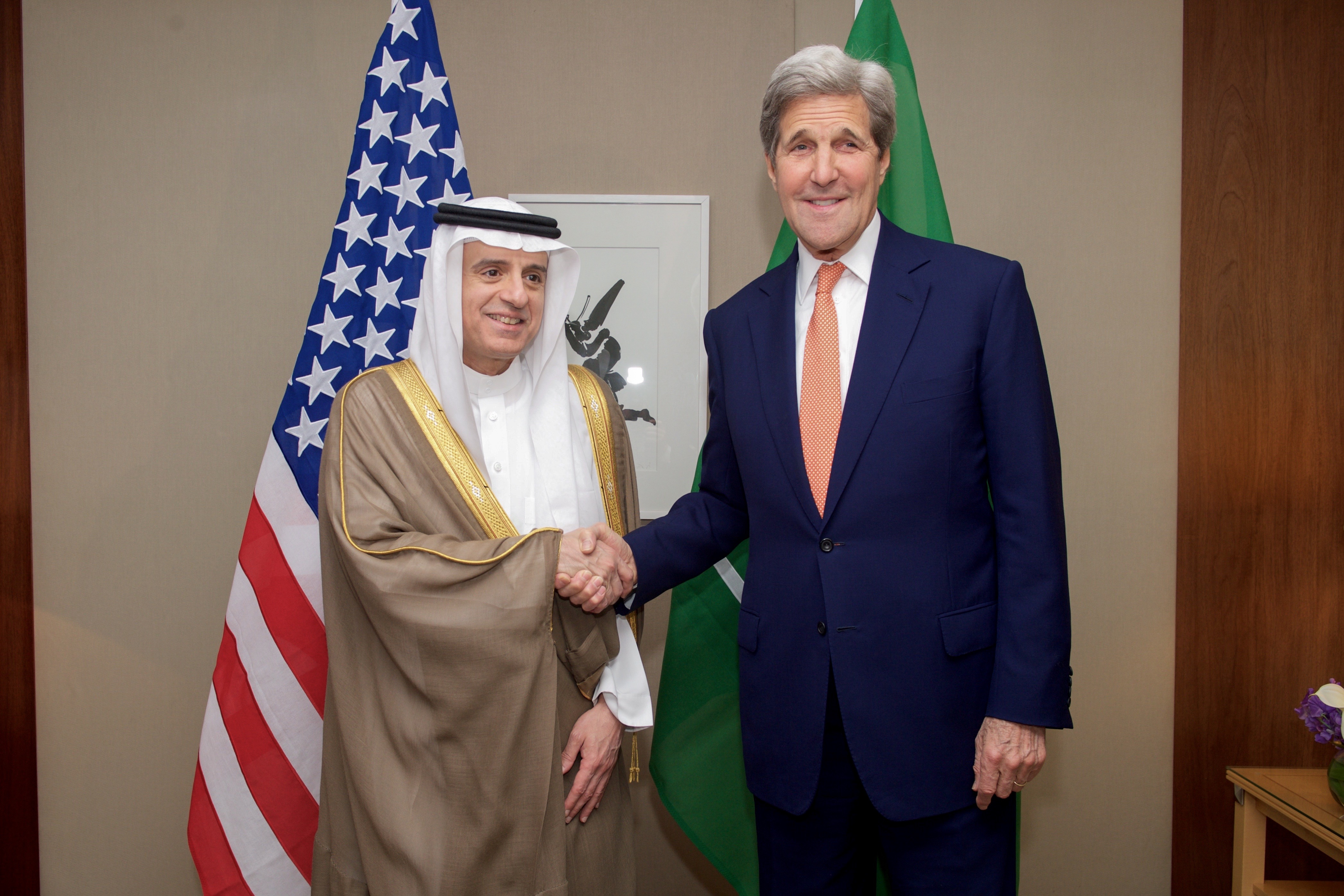
Secretary of State John Kerry with Saudi Foreign Minister Adel al-Jubeir during a meeting on Syria in May 2016

In late May 2016, more than a dozen U.S. special forces troops were seen in the village of Fatisah, less than 64 km (40 mi) north of Raqqa. They were fighting near the front lines with the YPG and wearing both YPG and U.S. insignia on their military uniforms; the operators were helping call in fire support for local SDF forces and coordinating airstrikes from behind the front lines in their advance toward Raqqa. However, the Pentagon and White House insisted that the troops were not fighting ISIL on the front lines and were still participating in a non-combat mission known as "train, advise and assist." Also in late May, a U.S. special forces operator was wounded north of Raqqa by indirect ISIL rocket or mortar fire.

The Telegraph reported that British special forces had been operating on the frontline in Syria, particularly in May when they frequently crossed the border from Jordan to defend a New Syrian Army (NSA) rebel unit composed of former Syrian special forces as it defended the village of al-Tanf against ISIL attacks. They mostly helped the unit with logistics such as building defenses and making bunkers safe. The NSA captured the village that month and faced regular ISIL attacks; an ISIL SVBIED drove into the base and killed 11 members of the NSA and injuring 17 others. The wounded were CASEVAC'd by U.S. helicopters to Jordan; the suicide attack damaged the structure of the al-Tanf base; British troops crossed over from Jordan to help them to rebuild their defences.

=== June 2016: Kurdish offensive to take Manbij ===
On 1 June, a senior U.S. defense official told Fox News that a "thousands"-strong SDF force consisting of Sunni Arab fighter and a small contingent of Kurdish fighters (mainly from the YPG) with assistance by U.S. special forces operators and fighter jets launched an operation to recapture the strategically important ISIL-held city of Manbij in northern Syria, 32 km (20 mi) from the border with Turkey; ISIL used the town to move supplies and foreign fighters into Syria from Turkey. In the 24 hours since the start of offensive, 18 U.S. airstrikes destroyed ISIL headquarters buildings, weapons caches, training areas, six bridges and an unknown number of ISIL fighters were killed; 15 civilians were also reported killed.

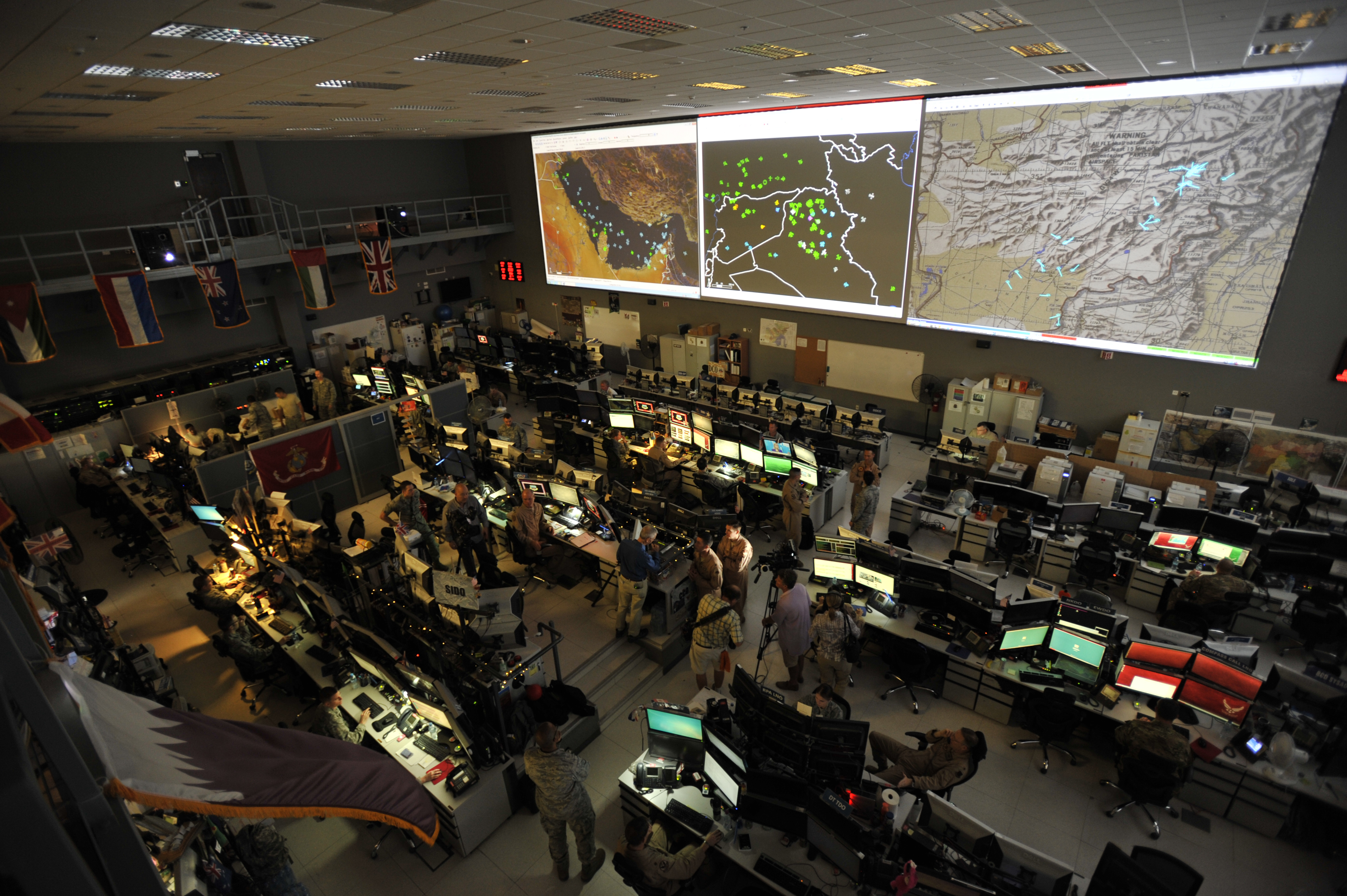
USAFCENT CAOC at Al Udeid Air Base, Qatar provides command and control of air power throughout Iraq and Syria.

On 3 June, F/A-18 Hornets launched from USS Harry S. Truman conducted air strikes against ISIS targets in Syria from the eastern Mediterranean. It was the first time the U.S. Navy had conducted strike missions in the Middle East from the Mediterranean Sea since flying operations against the Iraqi military in 2003.

By 9 June, the U.S. Central Command said the Coalition had conducted more than 105 strikes in support of the SDF's advance; French special forces were offering training and advice to SDF fighters in the area and on 15 June, British special forces were also reported to be operating in the area. Much of the SDF advance was made possible by Coalition air support, with airstrikes being directed by special forces personnel on the ground. On the same day, four U.S. special operations troops in northern Syria were "lightly" wounded by shrapnel when an Islamic State anti-tank missile fired at a nearby vehicle exploded, but they quickly returned to duty.

On 16 June, supposedly as part of Russia's campaign to pressure the U.S. to agree to closer cooperation over Syria, Russian military aircraft bombed, with cluster bombs, a military outpost in al-Tanf in southeast Syria that was garrisoned by the New Syrian Army (NSA); U.S. and British special forces based in Jordan regularly worked with Syrian rebels at the al-Tanf outpost. The airstrike happened 24 hours after a detachment of 20 British special forces left the outpost. After the airstrike took place, U.S. commanders warned Russia that the garrison was part of the international coalition against ISIL and therefore should not be attacked, but 90 minutes later, nearby U.S. warplanes observed Russian jets dropping a second barrage of bombs on the outpost, killing four rebel soldiers. A U.S. spy plane overhead tried to contact the Russian pilots on emergency frequencies, but the Russians did not answer. U.S. officials demanded an explanation from Moscow, but they were told the Russian pilots struck the outpost because they "thought it was an ISIL base", Russian officials then said that Jordan had approved the strikes in advance, but Jordan denied this. Moscow also claimed its air command headquarters in Syria was unable to call off the strikes because the U.S. had not given them the precise position of the outpost.

On 29 June, as part of the 2016 Abu Kamal offensive – the offensive by the Pentagon-trained New Syrian Army and several hundred other rebels from different factions that aimed to capture Abu Kamal and sever ISIL's transit link between Syria and Iraq – rebel forces entered the al-Hamdan air base – 5 km (3 mi) northwest of the border town Abu Kamal following intense clashes. This followed significant advances into ISIL-held territory near the Abu Kamal border crossing, the NSA said it had captured a number of ISIL positions on the outskirts of Abu Kamal, but a raid on the town at dawn was reported to have been repelled by militants. Fighting continued around the town, as coalition airstrikes were carried out on ISIL hideouts; the NSA also said it was coordinating the assault with Iraqi government forces, who were advancing on the border from the other side. The NSA issued a statement saying "the NSA maintains control of the desert, the approaches to Abu Kamal, and maintains freedom of manoeuvre". later on that day, ISIL militants ambushed the rebels, inflicting heavy casualties and seizing weapons, according to a rebel source. ISIL retook the airbase from the NSA and continued to advance against the rebels, recapturing some of the outposts the NSA had captured south of the town; Coalition helicopters dropped in "foreign" airborne troops on the southern edge of Abu Kamal to help the rebels in their advance; coalition jets also carried out eight airstrikes on ISIL targets in the Abu Kamal area. A contributing reasons for the failure of the U.S.-backed rebel operation was the withdrawing of air support at a critical moment; the aircraft assigned to the operation were ordered in the middle of the operation to leave the area and instead fly to the outskirts of Fallujah, where a large convoy of ISIL fighters, which U.S. commanders considered a "strategic target", had been seen trying to escape across the desert after the city was recaptured by the Iraqi army. The convoy was eliminated by American and British planes along with gunships and aircraft from the Iraqi air force.

=== August 2016: Operation Euphrates Shield ===
On 7 August, as part of Operation Tidal Wave II, "multiple" coalition warplanes destroyed some 83 oil tankers used by the Islamic State near Abu Kamal.

CNN reported that the Coalition carried out airstrikes in support of the Turkish intervention in Syria with Syrian opposition forces in August 2016, which seized the town of Jarabulus from ISIL and pushed south and west in an effort to clear the terror group from its border. U.S. special forces had initially intended to accompany the offensive but the U.S. was still working on approving the proposal when Turkish units pushed across the border.

On 30 August, the New York Times reported that Abu Mohammad al-Adnani was killed while traveling in a vehicle by a U.S. drone strike in Al-Bab. CNN reported that al-Adnani was a key deputy to ISIL's leader, he also acted as the principal architect in ISIL's external operations and as the group's spokesman; he also coordinated the movements of their fighters - directly encouraging them to carryout lone-wolf attacks on civilians and military targets. The strike marked the highest-profile killing of an ISIL member thus far.

=== September–October 2016: Coalition air raid on Deir ez-Zor ===
On 8 September, an airstrike allegedly carried out by the United States killed Abu Hajer al-Homsi (nom de guerre Abu Omar Saraqib), the top military commander of the renamed al-Nusra Front (Jabhat Fateh al-Sham) in the countryside of the Aleppo Governorate. Abu Hajer al-Homsi was one of the founding members of the al-Nusra Front and had taken part in the Iraq War against the U.S. when he was part of the processor organization al-Qaeda in Iraq. The Pentagon denied carrying out the strike and instead claimed Russia was responsible.

On 16 September, CNN reported that up to 40 U.S. special forces operators were accompanying Turkish troops and vetted Syrian opposition forces as they cleared ISIL from northern Syria. The mission, called Operation Noble Lance, was authorised that week and was now underway. Officially, the U.S. personnel were to conduct the same type of "advising, assisting and training" missions that the U.S. had been providing to moderate opposition and local anti-ISIL forces. The Washington Post reported that the contingent of Special Operations forces (SOF) assisting the Turkish and Syrian rebel forces around the cities of Jarabulus and al-Rai were sent at the request of the Turkish government.

On 17 September, two U.S. A-10s, two Danish F-16s, and a UK Reaper drone mistakenly bombed a Syrian Army-controlled base in the ISIL-besieged city of Deir ez-Zor. More than 62 Syrian soldiers were killed and at least 100 were wounded in the airstrike. ISIL forces attacked immediately after the Coalition airstrike and took the strategically important elevation near Deir ez-Zor airbase: Tharda (Thurda) mountain. According to Russian and Syrian government sources, SAA forces, supported by Russian and Syrian airstrikes, counterattacked and recaptured Tharda mountain by the end of the day, suffering additional losses, including one Syrian jet fighter. The USAF immediately issued an official explanation - it was a navigation\intelligence mistake and bombing was stopped after Russian Air Force contact informed them about the SAA loses. The Danish Air Force confirmed that their two F-16 fighters participated in the airstrike, insisting that operations stopped the split-second they received the message from the Russians and explaining it as a mistake and was regretting the losses. Russian officials accused the U.S. in helping ISIL due to the air raid. Russia also called for a meeting of the United Nations Security Council over the airstrike and the U.S. temporarily ceased airstrikes in the area. In response to the errant airstrike, the Syrian Armed Forces called it a "serious and blatant attack on Syria and its military".

On 3 October, Ahmad Salama Mabruk, a senior al-Nusra Front and previously Egyptian Islamic Jihad commander, was killed in a U.S. drone strike in Jisr al-Shughur.

=== November 2016 ===
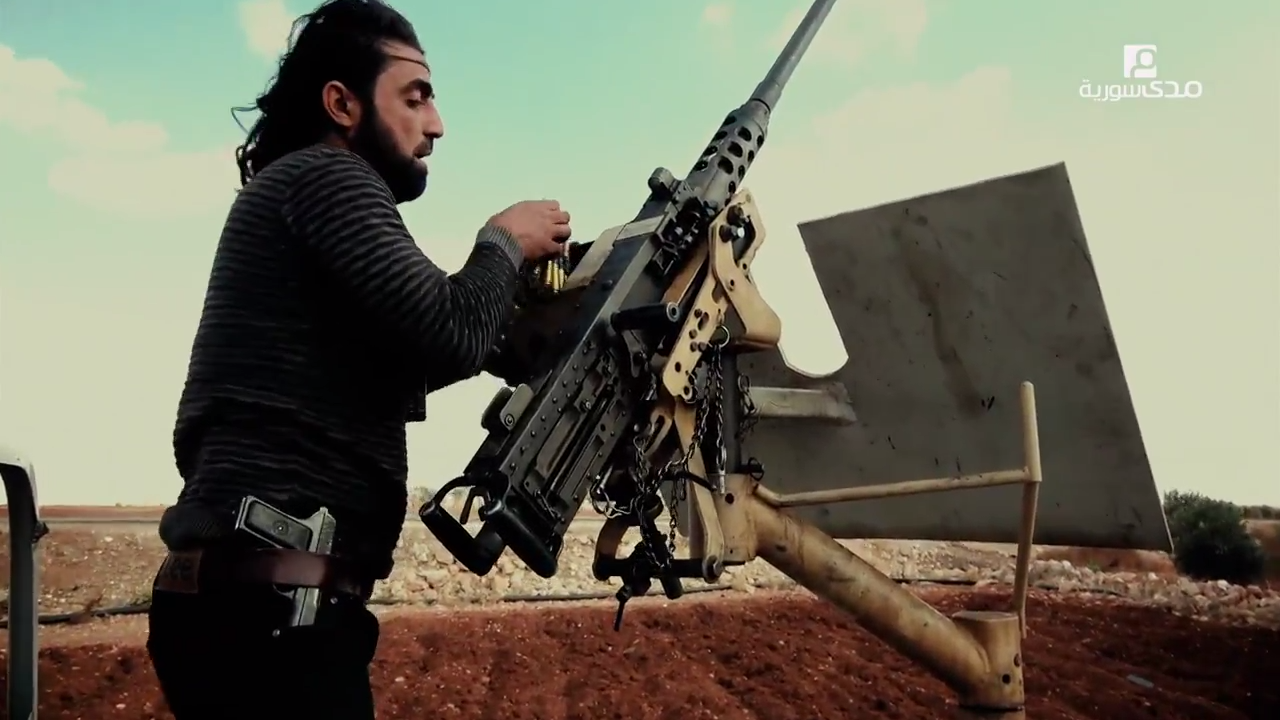
A rebel fighter from the FSA loads a U.S.-made M2 Browning heavy machine gun in northern Aleppo, November 2016

On 8 November, Donald Trump won the 2016 U.S. presidential election and began transitioning to becoming the next president and commander-in-chief of the U.S. Armed Forces, succeeding the outgoing Obama administration that had ordered the Syrian intervention. In 2015-2016, Trump had promised aggressive action against ISIL and suggested using NATO to fight ISIL, while initially not agreeing with his counterparts with targeting Syrian government forces with airstrikes. He also welcomed Russia's intervention in Syria as another force to degrade ISIL's power in the region.

The coalition bombs an ISIL training facility during the Raqqa campaign, 19 November 2016

On 18 November, a U.S. airstrike killed an Afghan al-Nusra Front commander, Abu Afghan al-Masri, in the town of Sarmada.

On 24 November, the Washington Post reported that Senior Chief Petty Officer Scott C. Dayton of Explosive Ordnance Disposal Mobile Unit 2 was killed by an IED near Ayn Issa - roughly 35 miles northwest of ISIL's self-proclaimed capital of Raqqa. It was the first time a U.S. service member was killed in Syria since a contingent of SOF was deployed there in October 2015. CNN reported that on 26 November, a U.S. drone strike in Raqqa killed Boubaker Hakim, a senior ISIL terrorist suspected of enabling the Sousse terrorist attack as he had connections to the Tunisian ISIL cell that carried out the attack and the Bardo National Museum attack. Pentagon spokesman Peter Cook said, "His removal degrades ISIL's ability to conduct further attacks in the West and denies ISIL a veteran extremist with extensive ties."

Stars and Stripes reported that in November 2016, airmen from the 621st Contingency Response Wing with a contingent of civil engineers, intelligence personnel, and security forces were temporarily deployed to expand and modify the airstrip that the airmen had established earlier in 2016 at an airbase where they deployed to near Kobani, so it can be used to assist in the offensive to retake Raqqa. The airbase gave the U.S. an additional location for its aircraft to support the Coalition and other anti-ISIL forces, but it had been used by U.S. forces limitedly due to the condition of the runway which restricted what types of aircraft could land there. General Carlton Everhart II, commander of U.S. Air Mobility Command, said that the base enabled aircraft to deliver critical supplies, equipment and help position forces; he added that airmen from the 621st group have supported anti-ISIL coalition forces on the ground in Syria.

=== December 2016 ===
On 8 December 2016, coalition airstrikes destroyed 168 oil tankers in Syria supporting ISIL's oil revenue.

On 4 December, it was reported that a U.S. airstrike in Raqqa killed three key ISIL leaders, two of whom (Salah Gourmat and Sammy Djedou) were involved in plotting the November 2015 Paris attacks.

On 8 December, during the 4th Palmyra offensive, U.S.-led Coalition warplanes bombed an ISIL convoy near Palmyra in central Syria and destroyed 168 trucks carrying petroleum.

On 10 December, it was reported that the U.S. was sending 200 more special operations personnel to Syria, joining the 300 U.S. special forces already in the country. Secretary of Defense Ash Carter said the troops would include special forces trainers, advisers and bomb disposal teams and that they will "continue organising, training, equipping, and otherwise enabling capable, motivated, local forces" to take the fight to ISIL. In particular, the troops will assist SDF forces in the ongoing Raqqa offensive; France also continues to have special operations units in the country.

The New York Times reported that on 15 December, Coalition warplanes destroyed 14 Syrian Army T-72 battle tanks, three artillery systems and a number of buildings and vehicles that ISIL militants were using at a military base in central Syria that they seized the previous weekend from Syrian troops and their Russian advisers. On 31 December, a Coalition airstrike in Raqqa killed Mahmud al-Isawi, al-Isawi was an ISIL member who supported the organization's media and intelligence structure in Fallujah before relocating to Raqqa. His role in the group was controlling the flow of instructions and finances between ISIL-held areas and ISIL leaders and provided support to propaganda and intelligence outlets; he was also known to have facilitated trans-regional travel with other ISIL external operations coordinators and had a close working and personal relationship with Abd al-Basit al-Iraqi, the emir of ISIL's Middle East attack network, according to the U.S. defense department.

== 2017 ==
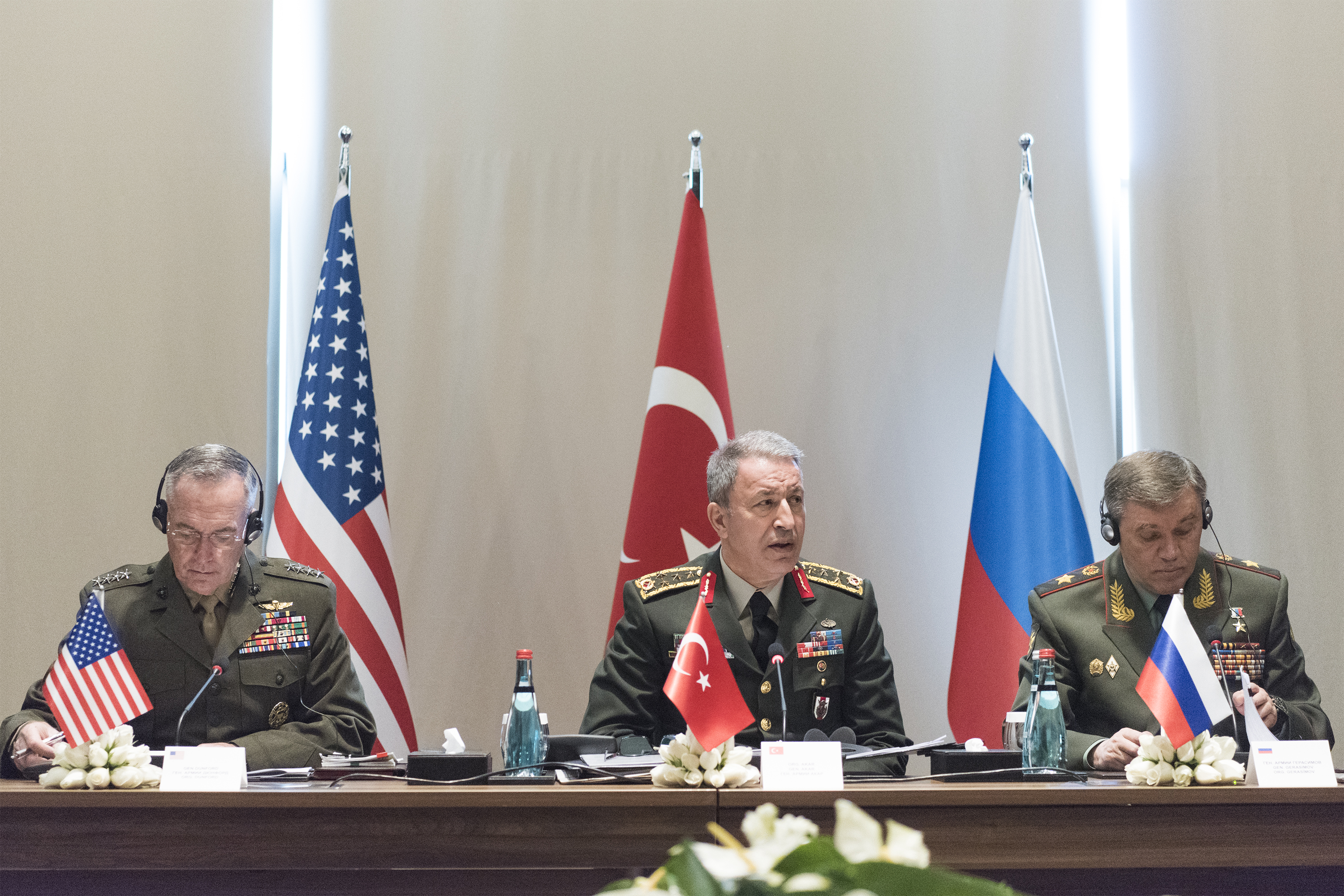
Joseph Dunford, Hulusi Akar and Valery Gerasimov discussing their nations’ operations in northern Syria, March 2017

=== January 2017 ===
On 1 January 2017, a United States drone strike killed Abu Omar al-Turkistani, a Jabhat Fatah al-Sham and Turkistan Islamic Party military commander, and three other JFS members near the town of Sarmada in the northern Idlib Governorate.

On 2 January, more than 25 JFS members were killed in an air raid by suspected U.S. warplanes.

On 6 January, as part of the Raqqa offensive, SDF forces, supported by American special forces and international coalition aircraft, seized Qalaat Jaabar fortress after fierce fighting with ISIL jihadist fighters.

On 8 January, coalition forces conducted a landing operation onto the road between the villages of Jazra and Kabr in the western Deir ez-Zor Governorate from four helicopters. The landing forces set up checkpoints on the road and raided a water plant in Kabr, where they killed and captured a number of ISIL fighters. After an hour and 15 minutes, the operation was complete and the forces withdrew.

On 11 January, an air-to-surface missile launched from suspected U.S. aircraft hit a Jabhat Fatah al-Sham (JFS) convoy consisting of five vehicles and killed 14 JFS members.

On 17 January, separate U.S. airstrikes in the Idlib Governorate killed Mohammad Habib Boussaboun al-Tunisi and Abd al-Jalil al-Muslimi, two Tunisian al-Qaeda external operations leaders. Also that day, it was reported that U.S. warplanes and combat advisers were supporting Turkish military units battling ISIL fighters in northern Syria, particularly at the Battle of al-Bab.

On 19 January, U.S. airstrikes by B-52 strategic bombers struck the former Syrian Army Sheikh Suleiman military base near Darat Izza, in western Aleppo, which was used by Jabhat Fatah al-Sham and the Nour al-Din al-Zenki Movement. The airstrike killed at least 110 JFS fighters and some al-Zenki fighters, including Abu Hasan al-Taftanaz, an al-Qaeda senior leader. Since 1 January 2017, more than 150 al-Qaeda members were killed by U.S. airstrikes in 2017. The Sheikh Suleiman base had been operated as a training camp by Jabhat Fateh al-Sham and al-Zenki since 2013.

According to the Syrian Observatory for Human Rights (SOHR), between 22 September 2014 and 23 January 2017, U.S.-led Coalition airstrikes killed 7,043 people across Syria, of which: 5,768 dead were ISIL fighters, 304 al-Nusra Front militants and other rebels, 90 Syrian government soldiers and 881 civilians.

On 20 January, the Trump administration began overseeing the Syrian intervention.

=== February 2017 ===
The coalition destroys an ISIL vehicle near Palmyra on 22 February 2017

On 1 February, it was reported that the U.S.-led Coalition had conducted an airstrike on the Carlton Hotel in the city of Idlib, which local and NGO sources said was a Syrian Arab Red Crescent (SARC) facility and which pro-government media said was used by Hayat Tahrir al-Sham (HTS)'s former al-Nusra component for troop housing, and hosting meetings of prominent commanders. The Coalition denied responsibility, although an investigation of open source materials confirmed a strike had occurred and that a SARC facility was damaged.

On 2 February, Sky News reported that Turkish aircraft killed 51 Islamic State fighters in the space of 24 hours in the areas of al-Bab, Tadef, Qabasin, and Bizaah. The airstrikes targeted buildings and vehicles resulting in 85 ISIL positions destroyed. According to Turkish military command, since the beginning of Operation Euphrates Shield, at least 1,775 ISIL militants had been "neutralised," with more than 1,500 of those killed.

On 3 February, U.S. airstrikes hit Jund al-Aqsa and Tahrir al-Sham (HTS) positions in Sarmin, near Idlib, and killed more than 12 militants. On the same day, the Royal Jordanian Air Force launched several airstrikes on ISIL outposts in southern Syria.

On 4 February, a U.S. airstrike killed Abu Hani al-Masri, who was part of Ahrar al-Sham at the time of his death, but described by the Pentagon as a former al-Qaeda commander. It was reported that there was speculation that he was about to defect to Tahrir al-Sham before his death.

On 26 February, in Al-Mastoumeh, Idlib, a U.S. drone strike killed Abu Khayr al-Masri, the deputy leader of al-Qaeda. He had been released and allowed into Syria as part of a prisoner swap between Iran and al-Qaeda in 2015. The U.S. airstrike also killed another Tahrir al-Sham militant, who was traveling in the same car. It was later revealed in May 2019 that the missile used in the airstrike was a Hellfire R9X, which has a kinetic warhead with pop-out blades, intended to reduce collateral damage.

=== March 2017: Regular U.S. forces arrive and the Battle of Tabqa ===
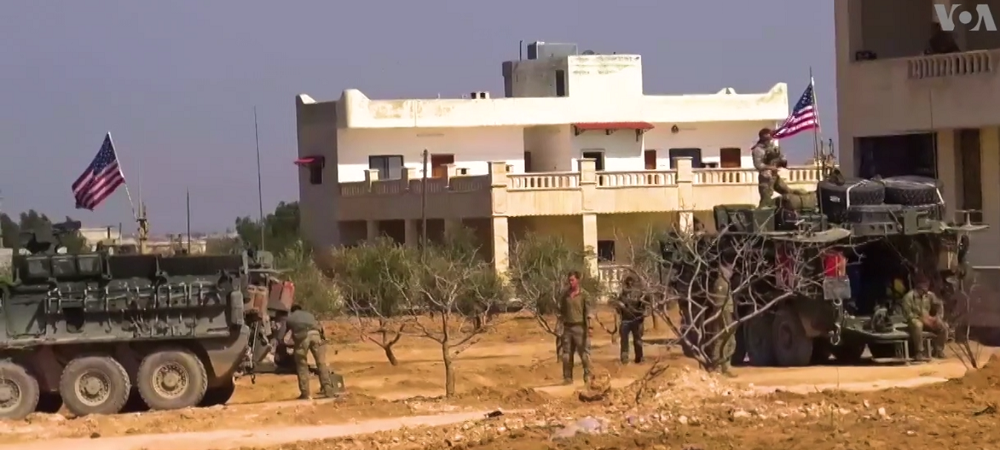
U.S. special operations forces near Manbij, acting as advisors to the Syrian Democratic Forces, March 2017

On 8 March, various news outlets reported that regular U.S. troops, part of an amphibious task force, left their ships in the Middle East and deployed to Syria to establish an outpost from which they can provide artillery support for U.S.-backed local forces who were preparing to assault Raqqa in a battle to liberate the city from ISIL control. The deployment marked a new escalation in the U.S.'s role in Syria and put more conventional U.S. troops on the ground, a role that, thus far, had primarily been filled by Special Operations units. The ground force was part of the 11th Marine Expeditionary Unit; 400 U.S. Marines from the Battalion Landing Team 1st Battalion, 4th Marines were tasked to crew an artillery battery of M777 howitzers whilst additional infantrymen from the unit will provide security. Resupplies were to be handled by a detachment of the expeditionary force's combat logistics element. A defense official with direct knowledge of the operation said the Marines were flown from Djibouti to Kuwait and then into Syria. By then, there were 900 U.S. soldiers and Marines deployed to Syria in total (500 special forces troops were already on the ground to train and support the SDF); under the existing limits put in place by the Obama administration, the formal troop cap for Syria is 503 personnel, but commanders have the authority to temporarily exceed that limit to meet military requirements.

There were approximately 100 U.S. Army Rangers in Stryker vehicles and armored Humvees deployed in and around Manbij in northern Syria, U.S. officials said. Officially, they were deployed there to discourage Syrian, Russian, or Turkish troops from making any moves that could shift the focus away from an assault on ISIL militants, specifically preventing them from inadvertently coming under fire. The U.S. believed the pressure on ISIL in Raqqa was working – a U.S. official said that intelligence indicated some ISIL leadership and operatives were continuing to try to leave the city. He added that there was also U.S. intelligence indicating the city was laced with trenches, tunnels, roadside bombs and buildings wired to explode, which, if correct, indicated that the U.S. was able to gather intelligence from both overhead surveillance aircraft and people on the ground. However, the official also noted that "Raqqa will probably not be the final battle against ISIS" and added that the group still had some personnel dispersed in areas south and east of the city. According to the official, the U.S. estimated that ISIL could have had roughly as many as 4,000 fighters in Raqqa. An official told The Guardian that in addition, the U.S. was preparing to send hundreds of troops to Kuwait on stand-by to be ready to fight ISIL in Syria if needed and the number would be fewer than 1,000. The Independent reported that Colonel John Dorrian, a spokesperson for Operation Inherent Resolve, said the artillery unit and the Army Rangers would not have a front line role.

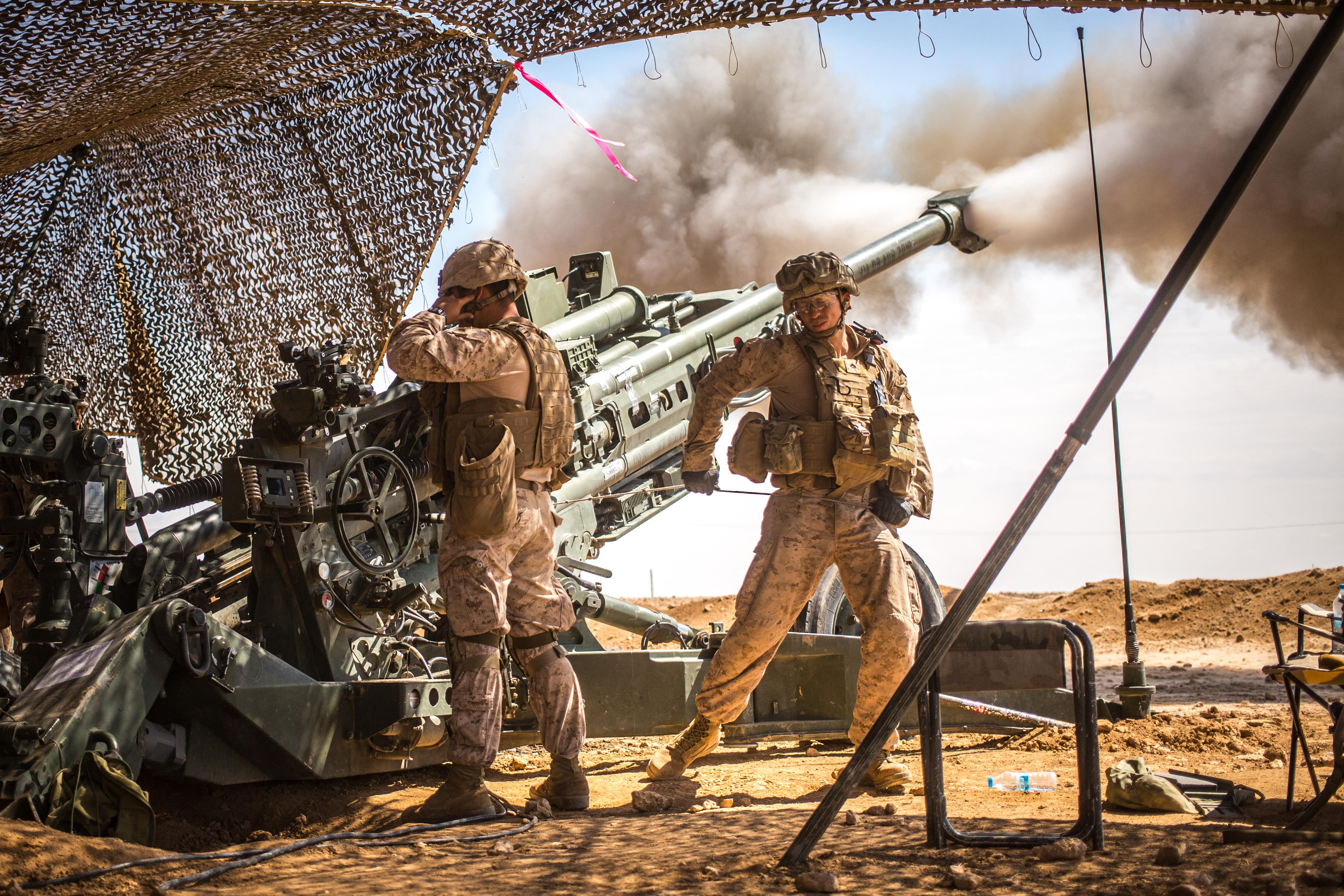
U.S. Marines manning artillery in northern Syria, March 2017

On 16 March, a U.S. drone strike hit a mosque west of Aleppo and killed between 45 and 49 people, mostly civilians. The location was assessed by the U.S. military as a meeting place for al-Qaeda and claimed that the airstrike hit a target across the mosque and was not targeted at the mosque itself.

Stars and Stripes reported that on 28 March, an airman assigned to the 21st Space Wing died in a non-combat incident (possibly of natural causes) in northern Syria.

On 22 March, hundreds of SDF fighters, with an undisclosed number of U.S. Special Operations troops operating as their advisers, launched a large-scale heliborne assault on ISIL around the area of the Tabqa Dam. They were inserted on the southern bank of the Euphrates river behind ISIL's defenses to take them by surprise; Colonel Joe Scrocca, an OIR spokesman, said that as a result of the air insertion behind ISIL lines, the SOF-SDF force did not come under fire. The following day, there was heavy fighting in the area; Col. Scrocca added that the ground forces were supported by helicopter gunships, U.S. Marine 155mm artillery and U.S. airstrikes.

Airwars reported that March 2017 saw the greatest number of munitions dropped during the war thus far – 3,878 munitions on ISIL targets in both Syria and Iraq, based on figures published by United States Air Forces Central Command – as well as the highest number of civilian deaths (between 477 and 1,216 non-combatants, 57% of which were in Syria) to date, likely caused by Coalition strikes, exceeding casualties caused by Russian strikes for the third consecutive month. Significant incidents that were attributed to Coalition strikes occurred in Tabqa and Kasrat al-Faraj during the Battle of Tabqa. The deadliest incident occurred in al-Mansoura, where local witnesses said at least 33 civilians were killed in a former school used to house displaced persons, although this was denied by the Coalition.

=== April 2017: Shayrat missile strike ===
U.S. Army Stryker vehicles drive through Qamishli onwards to the Syria-Turkey border after border clashes between the YPG and Turkey

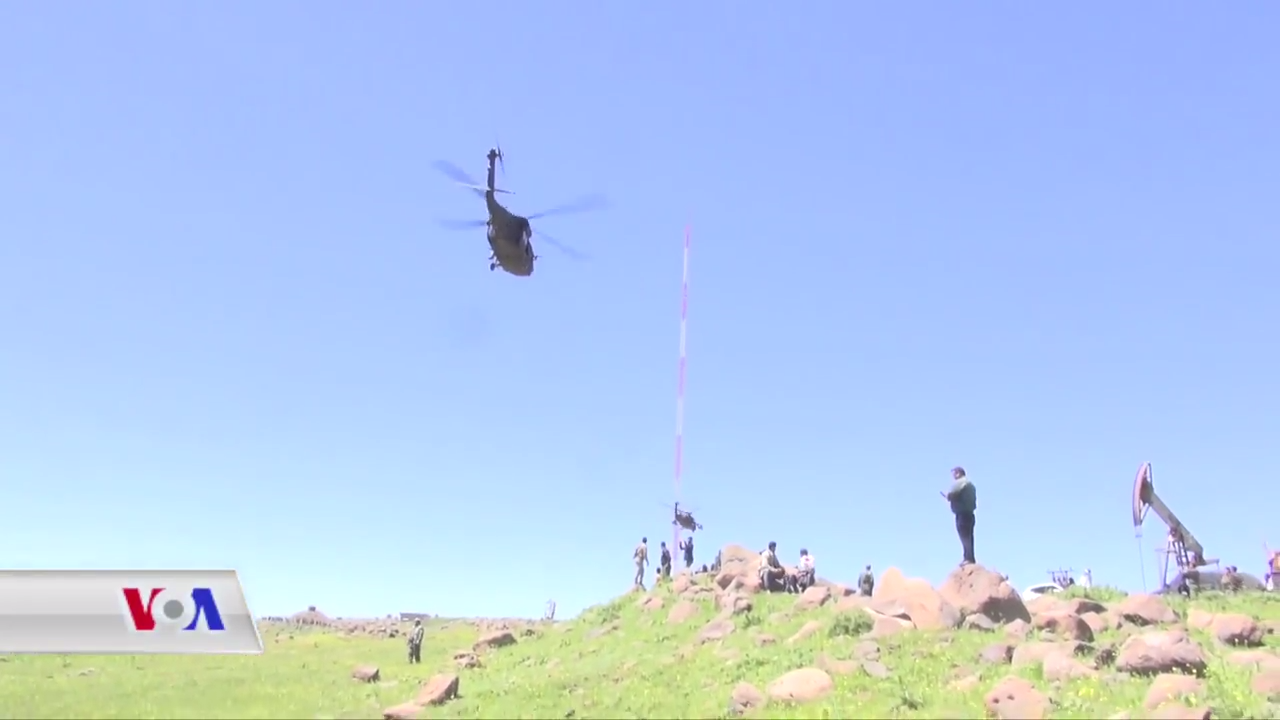
U.S. military helicopters fly over northeastern Syria

On 6 April, U.S. special forces conducted a landing operation against ISIL west of Deir ez-Zor. Two Coalition helicopters airdropped soldiers in the area who then interdicted a car on route from Raqqa to Deir ez-Zor. During the operation, U.S. forces killed four ISIL commanders and extracted a Jordanian spy who had infiltrated ISIL and served as one of its leaders. CNN reported that the operation took place near Mayadin and that one of the ISIL commanders killed by U.S. forces was Abdurakhmon Uzbeki, a top facilitator and close associate of ISIL's leader Abu Bakr al-Baghdadi; he was also connected to the 2017 New Year's nightclub bombing in Turkey.

On 7 April, in response to chemical weapon attacks (most notably the Khan Shaykhun chemical attack) against Syrian civilians allegedly by the Syrian government, the U.S. launched missile strikes on the airfield from which the chemical weapon attacks were allegedly launched. This incident marked the first deliberate direct attack by the U.S. on the Assad government. The Russian Foreign Ministry denounced the attack as being based on false intelligence and against international law, suspended the Memorandum of Understanding on Prevention of Flight Safety Incidents that had been signed with the U.S., and called an emergency meeting of the UN Security Council.

On 8 April, ISIL militants attacked a U.S. garrison at al-Tanf in Southern Syria: the garrison's main gate was blown up with a vehicle-borne improvised explosive device (VBIED), followed by a ground assault of about 20-30 ISIL militants, some of whom were wearing suicide vests. The U.S. Central Command said that the ″U.S. special operators″ at the base along with other coalition members and ″U.S.-backed Syrian fighters″, supported by multiple airstrikes, repelled the attack, with no American casualties. The Telegraph reported that during the battle, ISIL militants also ambushed a convoy of reinforcements from an allied rebel group who were trying to relieve the base.

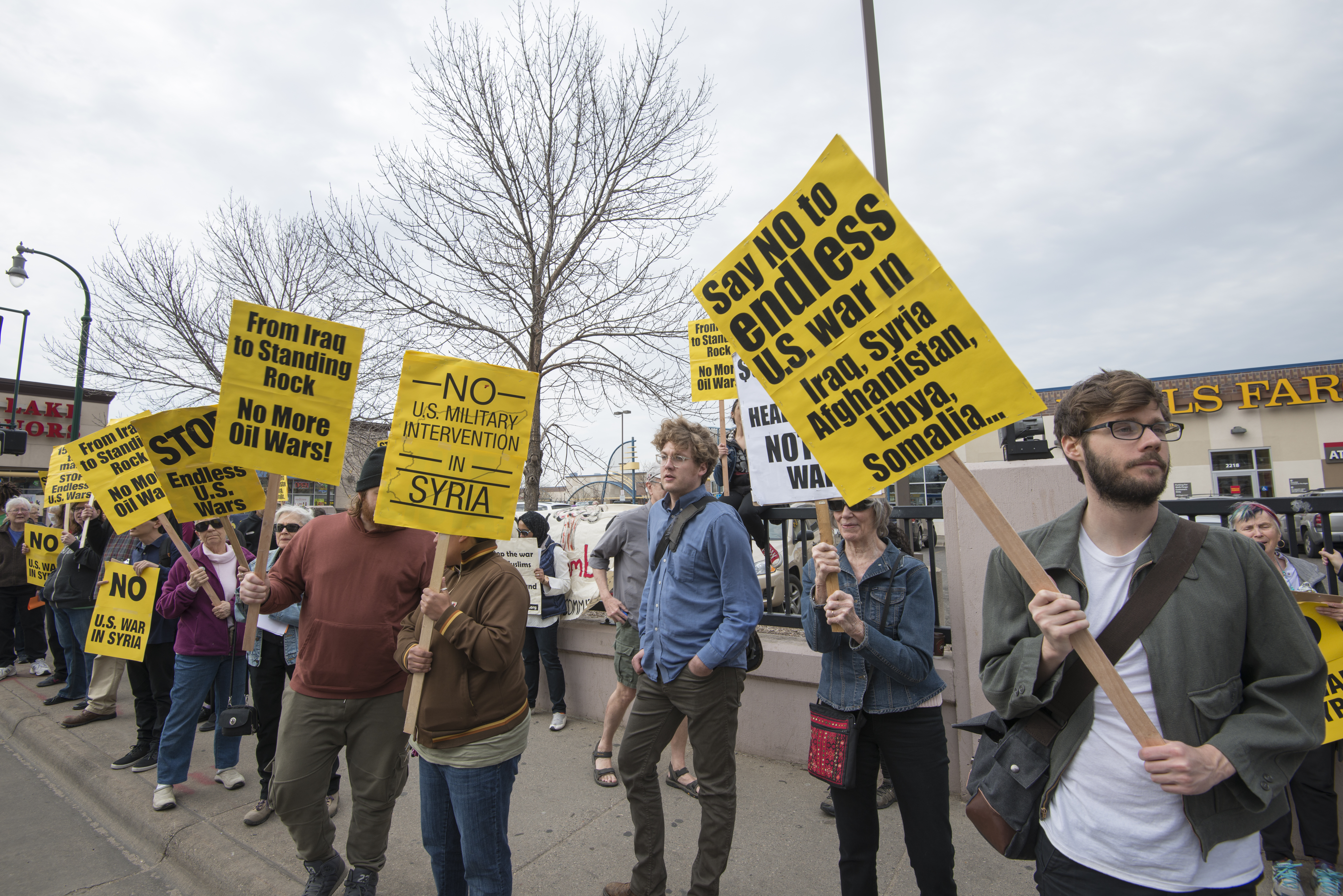
Protest against U.S. military actions in Syria, Minneapolis, April 2017

CNN reported that on 11 April, a misdirected U.S. airstrike near Tabqa, during the ongoing Raqqa offensive, killed 18 SDF soldiers.

=== May 2017 ===
The BBC reported that on 9 May, a Royal Air Force drone strike stopped an ISIL-staged public killing. The hellfire missile killed an ISIL sniper positioned on a rooftop set to shoot civilians attempting to walk away. No civilians were harmed and other ISIL fighters fled on motorbikes.

The Independent reported on 12 May that SDF forces had seized control of the Tabqa Dam after a deal struck by the SDF and around 70 ISIL militants; the deal included the dismantling of IEDs and booby traps, the surrender of heavy weaponry and withdrawal of remaining ISIL fighters from Tabqa city.

On 18 May, the U.S. conducted airstrikes on a convoy of a pro-government militia during the 2017 Baghdad–Damascus highway offensive. According to a U.S. defense official, before the strikes were conducted, government troops were warned they were getting too close to Coalition forces garrisoned at al-Tanf but did not respond. According to the U.S., four or five vehicles were destroyed, including a tank and two bulldozers. In contrast, the Syrian Army reported that two tanks were destroyed and a Shilka SPAAG was damaged. Eight soldiers were killed.

=== June 2017: Battle of Raqqa begins ===
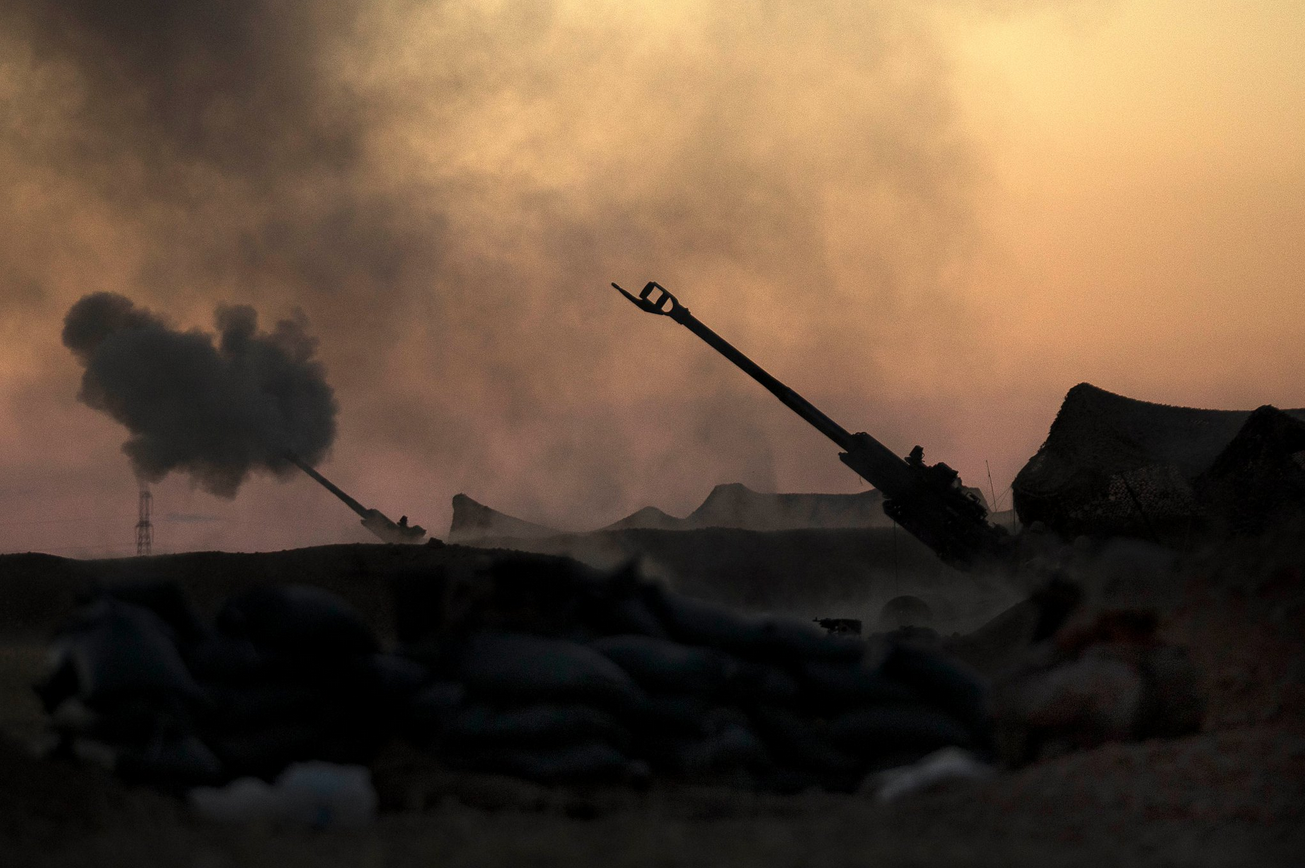
United States Marine Corps 2nd Battalion/10th Marines Battery F (Freedom) provide fire support to the SDF & SOF with M777A2 howitzers during the Battle of Raqqa

.

On 6 June, SDF ground troops backed by Coalition airstrikes launched the battle for Raqqa. USCENTCOM reported that 4,400 munitions were fired in support of operations in Raqqa, a dramatic increase from previous months.

Also on 6 June, U.S. aircraft conducted airstrikes on over 60 troops, a tank, artillery, antiaircraft weapons, and armed technical vehicles from pro-government forces that had entered what the Coalition called the al-Tanf "deconfliction zone". On 8 June, a U.S. F-15E Strike Eagle aircraft shot down a drone and other aircraft destroyed two armed pick-up trucks belonging to pro-government forces that moved near U.S. backed fighters at al-Tanf.

On 18 June, a U.S. F/A-18E Super Hornet shot down a Syrian Su-22 after it allegedly bombed an SDF position in Ja'Din, south of Tabqa. A statement by the Syrian Army claimed that the plane was on a mission to bomb ISIL militants. The same day, pro-government forces captured the village of Ja'Din following an SDF withdrawal. On 20 June, a U.S. F-15E shot down a pro-government Shahed 129 drone near al-Tanf after it "displayed hostile intent" and allegedly advanced towards Coalition forces.

Across Iraq and Syria, Airwars tracked 223 reported Coalition airstrikes with civilian casualties during June 2017, likely killing a minimum of between 529 and 744 civilians (including at least 415 in Syria, mainly in Raqqa governorate, making it the second mostly deadly month for civilians since the strikes began in 2014. Significant reported incidents included 3 June in Raqqa (20 civilians), 5 June (hitting civilians fleeing conflict), and 8 June in Raqqa (including reported white phosphorus use and a mosque hit).

=== August 2017 ===
On 21 August, U.S. forces in northern Syria were fired on by Turkish-backed Free Syrian Army units near Manbij, and returned fire in a short firefight.

On 29 August, following the Qalamoun offensive, ISIL militants were surrounded by Lebanese, Hezbollah and Syrian forces on both sides of the Lebanon–Syria border. They negotiated a safe-passage deal so that 670 ISIL fighters and their relatives would be taken from the border in vehicles to Abu Kamal. The U.S. military disapproved of the deal; Colonel Ryan Dillon, a spokesman for the U.S.-led coalition said the deal undermined efforts to fight the ISIL in Syria. U.S. aircraft carried out airstrikes, blocking the road the ISIL convoy was travelling on, before it reached ISIL-occupied territory in Deir ez-Zor Governorate. Dillon added that other U.S. airstrikes hit militants apparently attempting to join the stranded militants in the convoy. The Independent later reported that the convoy was trapped in between the towns of Humayma and al-Sukhnah.

=== September 2017 ===
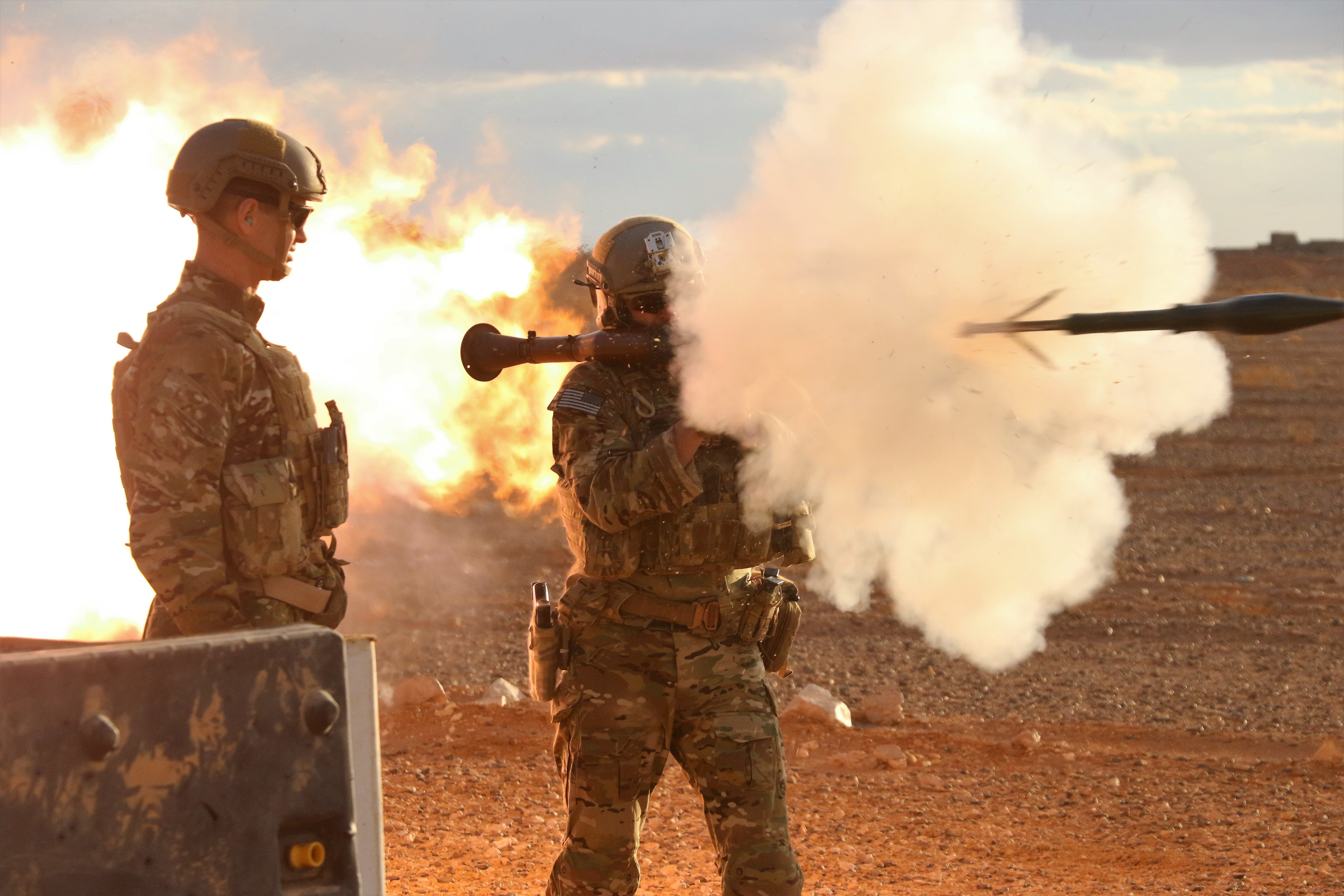
U.S. Green Berets during counter-ISIL operations in southern Syria, November 2017

On 3 September, the Independent reported that 400 ISIL militants and their families traveling in the convoy that was trapped by U.S. airstrikes in Syria in late August had abandoned their vehicles and began travelling on foot to the Iraqi border.

=== December 2017 ===
CNN reported that on 12 December, Maghawir Al-Thawra fighters accompanied by U.S. advisers intercepted a convoy of about ten vehicles that was passing through the 55 km "de-confliction" zone surrounding the coalition base at al-Tanf; a firefight ensued, resulting in 21 ISIL fighters killed and a further 17 captured.

CNN reported that on 13 December, two U.S. F-22A fighters intercepted two Russian Su-25 jets that crossed the "de-confliction line" multiple times. An Air Forces Central Command spokesman said that "The F-22s conducted multiple maneuvers to persuade the Su-25s to depart our de-conflicted airspace, including the release of chaff and flares in close proximity to the Russian aircraft and placing multiple calls on the emergency channel to convey to the Russian pilots that they needed to depart the area." One U.S. defense official said that a Russian Su-35 fighter was also involved in the incident.

On 22 December, Australian Defense Minister Marise Payne said that Australia will end their air strikes against the Islamic State and recall its six Super Hornet aircraft. Payne added that other Australian operations in the region would continue, with 80 personnel who are part of the Special Operations Task Group in Iraq, including Australian special forces, continuing their deployment.

== 2018 ==
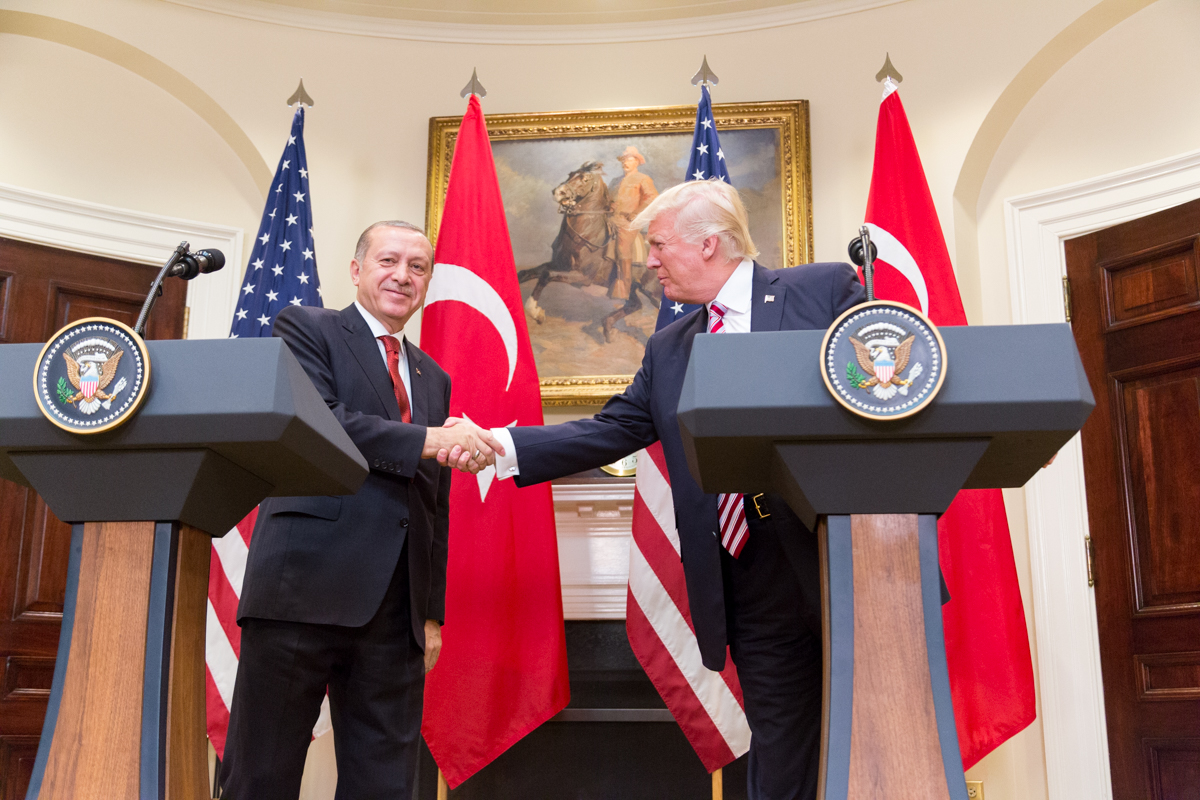
Turkish President Recep Tayyip Erdoğan criticized the United States' support for Kurdish YPG fighters in northern Syria.

=== January 2018 ===
Military Times reported on 12 January that Coalition aircraft carried out more than 90 airstrikes between January 4 and January 11 near the Iraq-Syria border.

Military Times also reported that on 20 January, U.S. airstrikes targeting an ISIL headquarters and command and control center in the Middle Euphrates River Valley (MERV) near Al-Shaafah killed nearly 150 ISIL militants. According to a press release, SDF fighters provided target observation and intelligence on the target.

=== February–March 2018: The Khasham engagement ===
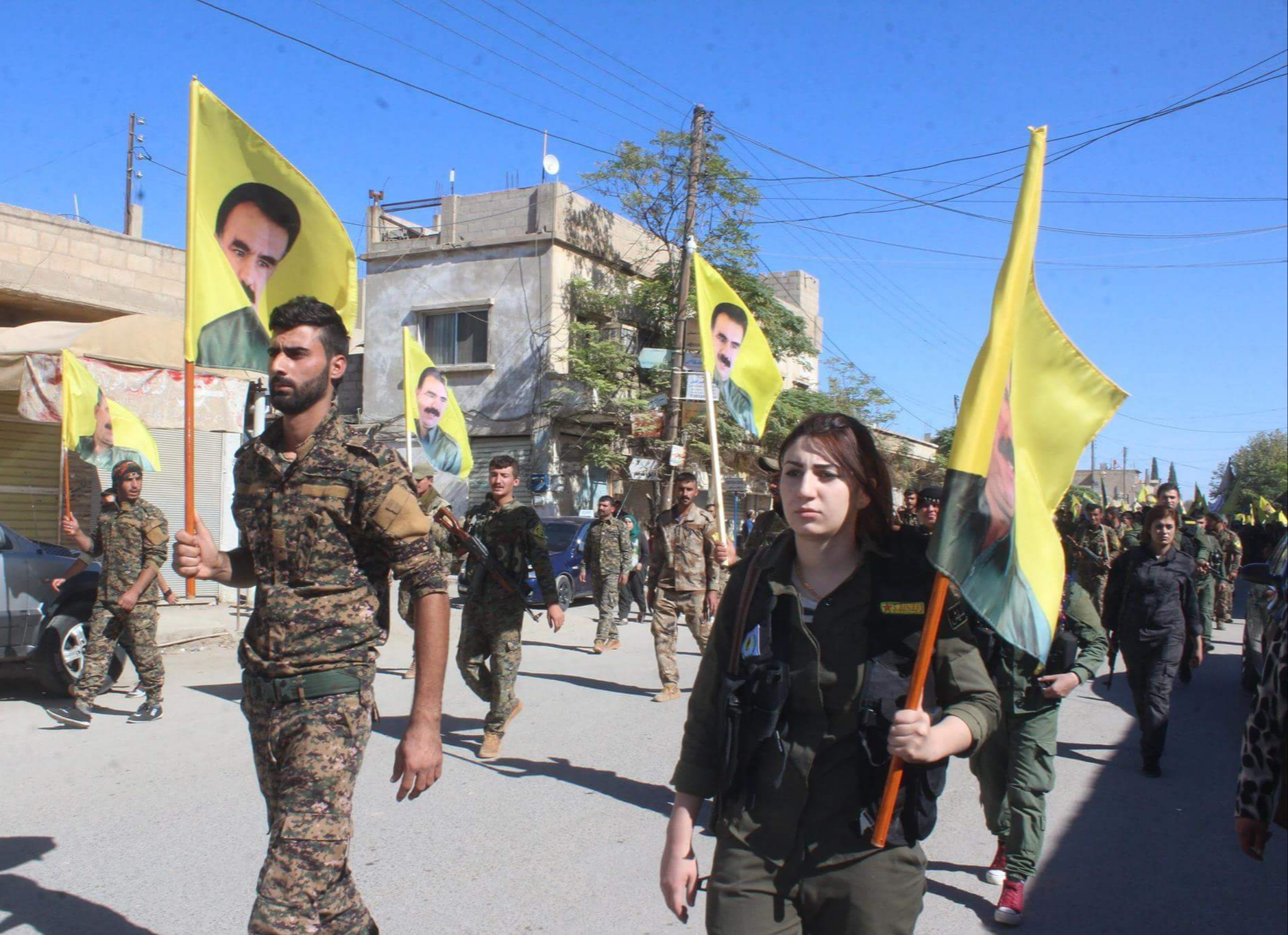
Kurdish YPG and YPJ fighters in February 2018

According to U.S. military officials, on 7 February, in deliberate air and artillery strikes, the U.S.-led coalition killed more than 100 pro-government fighters in the Euphrates River valley in Deir ez-Zor province after they launched an "unprovoked attack" against the Syrian Democratic Forces. Syrian state news corroborated the events, but insisted that the Kurdish forces were mixed in with ISIL forces; it also stated that ten Russian mercenaries were among those killed.

CNN reported that on 30 March, Master Sergeant Jonathan J. Dunbar of Delta Force and Sergeant Matt Tonroe of the British Special Air Service were killed by an IED blast during a mission in Manbij, the objective of which was – according to Pentagon spokesman Major Adrian Rankine-Galloway – to "kill or capture a known ISIS member."

=== April–June 2018 ===
On 14 April, U.S. President Donald Trump announced that the U.S., France, and the United Kingdom had decided to carry out a series of military strikes against the Syrian government. The strikes came in the wake of the Douma chemical attack.

On 1 May, the SDF, in coordination with the Iraqi Armed Forces, announced the resumption of their Deir ez-Zor offensive to capture the final ISIL enclaves near the Iraqi border and along the Euphrates. By 3 May, the USS Harry S. Truman carrier strike group had joined in support of the SDF's anti-ISIL operations.

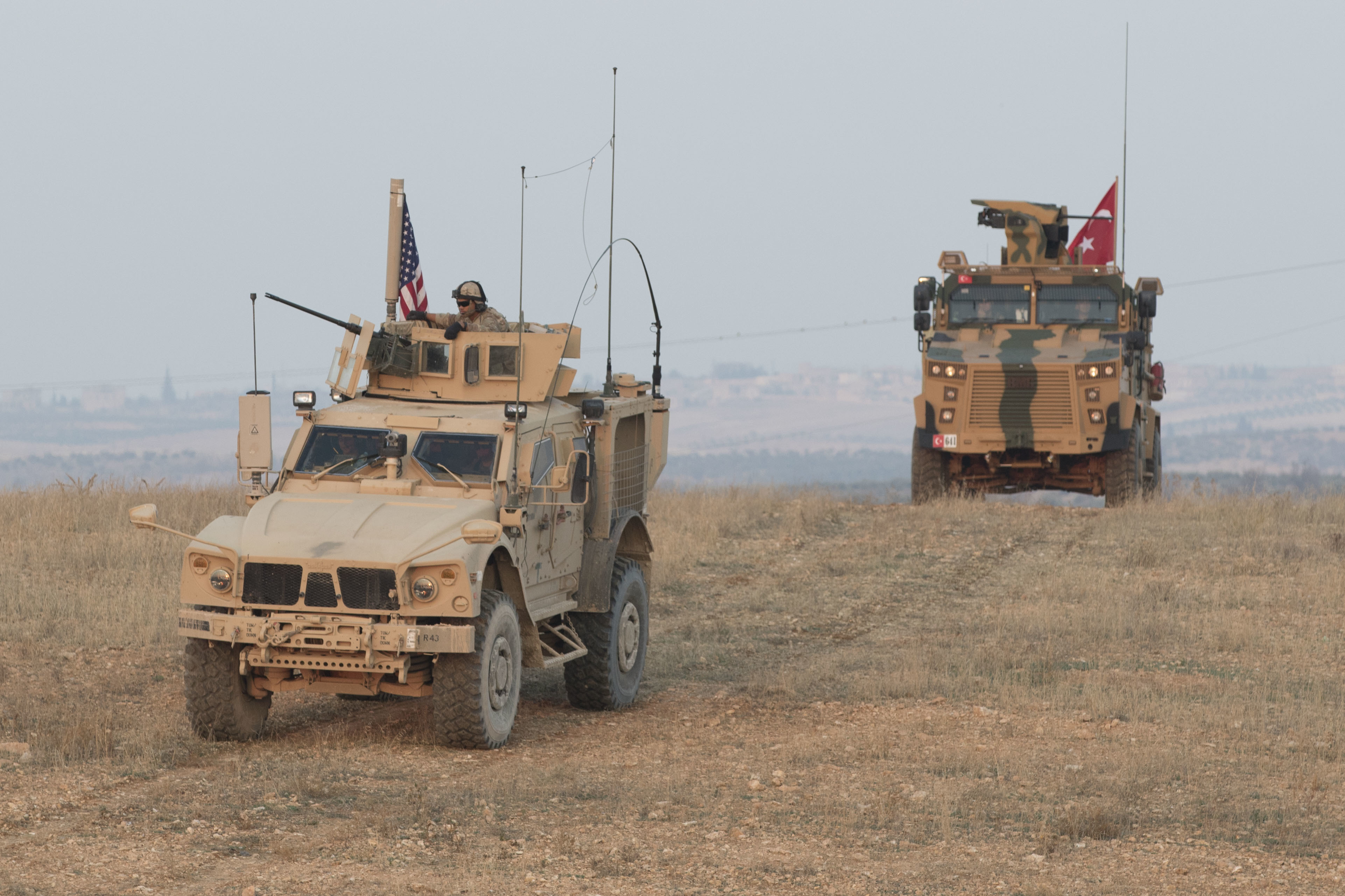
U.S. and Turkish forces conduct joint patrols on the outskirts of Manbij, Syria, 8 November 2018

=== November 2018 ===
On 1 November, the Coalition began a series of joint patrols with the Turkish Armed Forces along the frontlines of the Kurdish-controlled Manbij region and the Turkish-backed Free Syrian Army's territory. The move was seen as a part of a "roadmap" to ease tensions between the NATO ally and U.S. backed Kurdish forces, and reduce violence between Kurdish and Turkish-backed elements.

On 21 November, U.S. Secretary of Defense Jim Mattis announced the U.S. would set up new observation posts along the Turkish border in northern Syria in order to reduce skirmishes between Turkish forces and armed Kurdish militants in the region such as the border clashes in late October-early November. Mattis affirmed that it was a co-operational endeavor with Turkey and it will not require additional U.S. troops to be deployed to Syria.

=== December 2018: Initial announcement of U.S. withdrawal ===
CJTF-OIR airstrike on an ISIL fuel truck in al-Susah, 29 November 2018

President Donald Trump, declaring "we have won against ISIS," unilaterally announced on 19 December 2018 that the remaining 2,000-2,500 U.S. troops in Syria would be withdrawn. Trump made the announcement on Twitter, overruling the recommendations of his military commanders and civilian advisors, with apparently no prior consultation with Congress. Although no timetable was provided, Press Secretary Sarah Sanders indicated that the withdrawal had already been ordered. Various sources indicated that Trump had directed that the withdrawal be completed within 30 days. However, Reuters was told by a U.S. official that the withdrawal was expected to take 60 to 100 days. Following Trump's surprise announcement, the Pentagon and State Department tried to change his mind, with several of his congressional and political allies expressing serious concerns about the sudden move, specifically that it would hand control of the region to Russia and Iran and abandon America's Kurdish allies.

CNN reported on 24 December that during the weeks before Trump's withdrawal announcement, national security advisor John Bolton told senior officials to meet directly with anti-ISIL coalition partners to assure them that America would remain in Syria until Iran had left. One senior administration official commented that Trump's decision was "a complete reversal," done "without deliberation," reportedly leaving allies and partners "bewildered." According to one CNN analysis, the announcement reportedly came as the Coalition had reason to believe ISIL leader Abu Bakr al-Baghdadi and his top commanders were possibly cornered in a small pocket of northern Syria, "in a Tora Bora situation" akin to the region where al-Qaeda leader Osama bin Laden escaped from American forces in 2001.

On 27 December, administration officials stated that USCENTCOM's troop withdrawal plan entailed the withdrawal taking place over several months instead of weeks, falling in line with Trump's post-announcement comments that the pullout of U.S. troops would be "deliberate and orderly." By the end of the month, it remained unclear whether anti-ISIL air operations would continue post-withdrawal. By 31 December, after U.S. Senator Lindsey Graham and a group of generals held a luncheon with the president over the withdrawal, Graham tweeted that Trump would seek a more gradual withdrawal over a course of several months; a slow down of the withdrawal was not officially confirmed by the administration at the time.

Many experts proposed that Trump could mitigate the damage of the withdrawal by using the CIA's Special Activities Center. Many believed Trump chose "to replace U.S. ground forces in Syria with personnel from the CIA's Special Activities Center" and that the process had already been underway for months. Already experienced in operations in Syria, the CIA had numerous paramilitary officers who possessed the skills to operate independently in harms way. While the CIA lacked the numbers to replace all 2,000 U.S. military personnel in Syria at the time and work alongside the Syrian Democratic Forces, but their model was based on fewer enablers and support.

== 2019 ==
=== January 2019 ===
CJTF-OIR airstrike on an ISIL building in al-Shaafah, 4 January 2019

On 6 January 2019, U.S. National Security Advisor John Bolton, while on a trip to Israel and Turkey, said that the pullout of U.S. troops from Syria depended on certain conditions, including the assurance that the remnants of ISIL forces are defeated and Kurds in northern Syria were safe from Turkish forces. However, Turkey's President Recep Tayyip Erdogan rejected the call to protect Kurdish troops, whom he regarded as terrorist groups. On 10 January, U.S. Secretary of State Mike Pompeo said that the U.S. would withdraw its troops from Syria while continuing the battle against ISIL. He also stated that there would be no U.S. reconstruction aid for areas controlled by Syrian President Bashar al-Assad until Iran and its "proxies" had left. On 11 January, Coalition spokesman Col. Sean Ryan confirmed the U.S. troop withdrawal process from Syria had begun. "Out of concern for operational security, we will not discuss specific timelines, locations or troops movements," he said. The SOHR observed that the Coalition had started scaling down its presence at Rmeilan airfield in al-Hasakah. U.S. defense officials said it had begun the removal of equipment, but not yet troops, and that the total number of U.S. soldiers in Syria may temporarily increase in order to provide security for the final pullout. French Foreign Minister Jean-Yves Le Drian welcomed what he believed was a slower, more effective withdrawal by the U.S. after pressure from its allies.

On 15 January the Coalition released fresh numbers regarding their ongoing operations in both Syria and Iraq. Between 30 December 2018 and 6 January 2019, the Coalition conducted 575 air and artillery strikes against ISIL in Syria; the strikes destroyed 105 ISIL mortar and rocket artillery units, 50 IED manufacturing sites, 26 vehicles, 19 weapons caches, and two UAV systems. Between January 7 and 13, airstrikes in the MERV near the Iraqi border also killed around 200 militants including four senior commanders.

On 29 January, with ISIL cornered in its final redoubt due to the Kurdish-led conquest against it in the Middle Euphrates River Valley, acting U.S. Defense Secretary Patrick Shanahan proclaimed at his first news conference as SecDef that the Coalition will liberate all of the Islamic State's remaining self-proclaimed caliphate in "two weeks". "I'd say 99.5 percent plus of…the ISIS-controlled territory has been returned to the Syrians. Within a couple of weeks it will be 100 percent," Shanahan said. He added that the U.S. is still in the early stages of what he called a "deliberate, coordinated, disciplined withdrawal," from Syria and that "very important dialogues going on in major capitals" about support to Syria once the U.S. leaves, were ongoing.

=== February 2019: Battle of Baghuz ===
President Donald Trump reiterated his support for withdrawing American ground troops from both Syria and Afghanistan in a series of tweets on 1 February amid proliferating concerns among America's allies, politicians, analysts, and local activists over a feared power vacuum in Syria post-withdrawal. "I inherited a total mess in Syria and Afghanistan, the 'Endless Wars' of unlimited spending and death. During my campaign I said, very strongly, that these wars must finally end. We spend $50 Billion a year in Afghanistan and have hit them so hard that we are now talking peace after 18 long years," Trump tweeted. The day prior, the U.S. Senate had issued a rebuke of the president cautioning against the "precipitous withdrawal" of military forces; furthermore the United States Intelligence Community contradicted the president on its perception of the global threat ISIL continued to pose during a Senate committee hearing. A draft Pentagon report emerged on 1 February warning that ISIL could regain territory in Syria within a year following a U.S. disengagement from Syria. On 5 February, CENTCOM commander General Joseph Votel noted during a Senate Armed Services Committee testimony that he had not been consulted prior to Trump's decision to withdraw American forces, reinforcing the notion that the U.S. withdrawal was ordered completely unilaterally from the White House without prior consultation with relevant military advisors and Defense Department personnel.

On 6 February, President Trump, while at a summit of 79 foreign ministers and officials that assisted in the global coalition against ISIL, predicted a formal announcement of a final victory against ISIL as early as the following week. "Remnants - that's all they have, remnants - but remnants can be very dangerous," Trump said in regards to ISIL. "Rest assured, we'll do what it takes to defeat every ounce and every last person within the ISIS madness". The Wall Street Journal, citing State Department officials, reported on 8 February that the U.S. pullout was expected to be complete by April, with the majority of ground troops expected to be already withdrawn by mid-March. A U.S. official confirmed to Reuters that the withdrawal included pulling troops from al-Tanf.

An Operation Inherent Resolve summary on Coalition activity between 27 January and 9 February detailed air and artillery strikes conducted in Iraq and Syria. The Coalition conducted 176 strikes in Syria. Targets included: 146 ISIL tactical units, 131 supply routes, 53 fighting positions, 31 staging areas, 14 VBIEDs, 13 pieces of engineering equipment, 11 explosive belts, nine tankers for petroleum oil and lubricants, eight tactical vehicles, five command and control nodes, four buildings, three aircraft operations areas, three tunnels, two petroleum oil and lubricant storage facilities, two manufacturing facilities for IEDs, two artillery pieces, two weapons caches, and one armored vehicle.

The SDF's conquest of the Euphrates river ISIL enclave from 30 November 2018 to 23 March 2019

After the SDF's assault on Baghuz Fawqani began on 9 February, CENTCOM commander Joseph Votel told CNN on 11 February that ISIL losing physical territory does not mean the end of the organization. "Putting military pressure on [ISIL] is always better, it's always easier when you are there on the ground, but in this case our President has made a decision and we are going to execute that and so it's my responsibility as the CENTCOM commander working with my chain of command to look at how we do that," adding that the completion of the U.S. pullout was "weeks away...but then again it will be driven by the situation on the ground".

Trump tweeted late on 16 February urging European countries to repatriate the over 800 captured suspected ISIL members from Syria, warning the U.S. may be forced to release them otherwise. Kurdish prisons could not hold the ISIL members and all their families, totaling around 2,000 people, indefinitely. The Kurds called the situation a "time bomb". The U.S.-Kurdish demand to take responsibility got mixed responses from Europe. German foreign minister Heiko Maas said repatriation would be possible only if returning fighters could be immediately taken into custody, which would be "extremely difficult to achieve" without proper judicial information. France, whose citizens made up the majority of European ISIL recruits, said it would not act immediately on Trump's call but would take militants back "case by case," and not categorically. Britain has said its fighters can return only if they seek consular help in Turkey, while acknowledging repatriation was a dilemma. Belgium’s justice minister Koen Geens called for a "European solution," urging "calm reflection and a look at what would pose the least security risks." The Hungarian foreign minister, Péter Szijjártó, said the issue was "one of the greatest challenges ahead of us for the upcoming months."

After announcing the U.S. would keep a "peacekeeping" force of around 200-400 troops in Syria – instead of the initially planned total withdrawal – on 22 February, senior Trump administration and defense officials stated the decision was an endorsement of a plan pressed by U.S. military leaders for some time, calling for an international force, preferably NATO or regional Arab allies, of 800 to 1,500 troops that would monitor a safe zone along Syria's border with Turkey.

=== March–April 2019: Talon Anvil Baghuz strike and ISIL territorial collapse ===
On 10 March, John Bolton stated that he was "optimistic" France and the UK would commit personnel to the planned observer force. He also reiterated the U.S. commitment to keep troops in Iraq.

On 18 March, during the ongoing Battle of Baghuz Fawqani, the U.S. Air Force's Talon Anvil special operations unit (a Delta Force unit within the larger Task Force 9) bombed a group of people in Baghuz, killing up to 80 (64 civilians and at least 16 ISIL militants). According to CENTCOM spokesman Captain William (Bill) Urban, the U.S.-backed SDF called in air support on a position following a recent ISIL counterattack that almost overran them, but the only UAV above the battlefield recorded standard-definition video and the only available offensive aircraft was an F-15E jet; however a high-definition coalition UAV was operating in the area, unbeknownst to Talon Anvil. The SDF, the standard-definition UAV operator, and Talon Anvil all concluded there were no civilians in the area, with the latter approving the airstrike, in which the F-15E dropped three 500 lb. bombs on the gathering, reportedly to the surprise of drone activity analysts. According to Capt. Urban, hours after the strike, the UAV operator reported possible civilians in the area, and a bomb damage assessment and investigation acknowledged there were civilian casualties but called the bombing "legitimate self-defense strikes" and "proportional due to the unavailability of smaller ordinance at the time of the request," citing video showing "multiple armed women and at least one armed child". The 64 civilians were likely exclusively women and children and the airstrike was covered up by the U.S. military—it was not included in the coalition's annual civilian casualty report and the site was reportedly bulldozed—and it was not revealed to the public until mid-November 2021 amid media reports of a possible war crime cover up in Syria. Urban added that procedures were changed following the strike, requiring the "strike cell" on the ground to coordinate with coalition aircraft and the usage of only high-definition drone surveillance before such strikes are ordered.

On 20 March, in response to new developments in Baghuz, President Trump predicted that the remaining ISIL holdout would be cleared "by tonight" during a speech at the Lima Army Tank Plant in Lima, Ohio. "The caliphate is gone as of tonight," he said, as he used maps depicting ISIL's territorial collapse since November 2016; later, the November 2016 map was shown to actually be a map from 2014 when ISIL was at its peak territorial size, before the Coalition's anti-ISIL operations.

On 23 March, the SDF announced victory in the battle for Baghuz, signifying the territorial collapse of ISIL in Syria, a critical milestone for the U.S.-led Syrian intervention. U.S. Deputy Assistant Secretary of Defense Michael Mulroy stated that the physical caliphate was defeated but ISIL was not and that there were over 10,000 completely unrepentant fighters left in Syria and Iraq. He expected the U.S. to be in Syria for the long haul with a very capable partner in the Syrian Democratic Forces. He said that the U.S. partnership with the SDF was a model to follow, like the partnership with the Northern Alliance in Afghanistan to defeat the Taliban and with the Kurdish Peshmerga in Iraq as the northern front against Saddam Hussein.

U.S.-Turkish negotiations over joint troop patrols in a designated safe zone along the northern Turkish-Syrian border continued into late April as the UK and France rejected a plan to provide troops to a buffer zone between Rojava and Turkey, claiming their missions in Syria are only to fight ISIL. With their troop numbers set to be cut to 1,000 in upcoming months, the U.S. reportedly prefers a narrower strip of land to patrol than the approximately 20 miles that Turkey has proposed. The Turks would send their own troops into the buffer zone while only demanding U.S. logistical help and air cover. The Turkish proposal reportedly saw push back as the Americans prefer to avoid a situation that effectively pushes the Turkish border 20 miles into Syria, further increasing the chances of clashes with the Kurds instead of reducing it.

=== May 2019 ===
The Syria Study Group, a U.S. Congressionally appointed panel of experts tasked with assessing the situation in Syria, similar to the Iraq Study Group appointed in 2006, released an interim report on 1 May endorsing the view that instead of a draw down, the U.S. should reassert its presence in Syria, citing the prospect of a potential ISIL resurgence, Russian "prestige" after successfully propping up the Assad government, perceived Iranian entrenchment in the country, and al-Qaeda retaining control in the form of Hayat Tahrir al-Sham's dominance in northwestern Syria, a region U.S. warplanes rarely venture to due to the nearby presence of Russian air defenses deployed on behalf of the Syrian government. The report argued that the U.S. should step up attempts to isolate Assad and counter Iranian influence in the region; it also argued that the U.S. should take in more Syrian refugees, the admittance of which the Trump administration has reduced from thousands to just a few dozen in recent years. The report further underlined the differing views between the president and comparatively more hawkish Congress on what direction to take the U.S.'s commitments in the country.

=== June–July 2019 ===
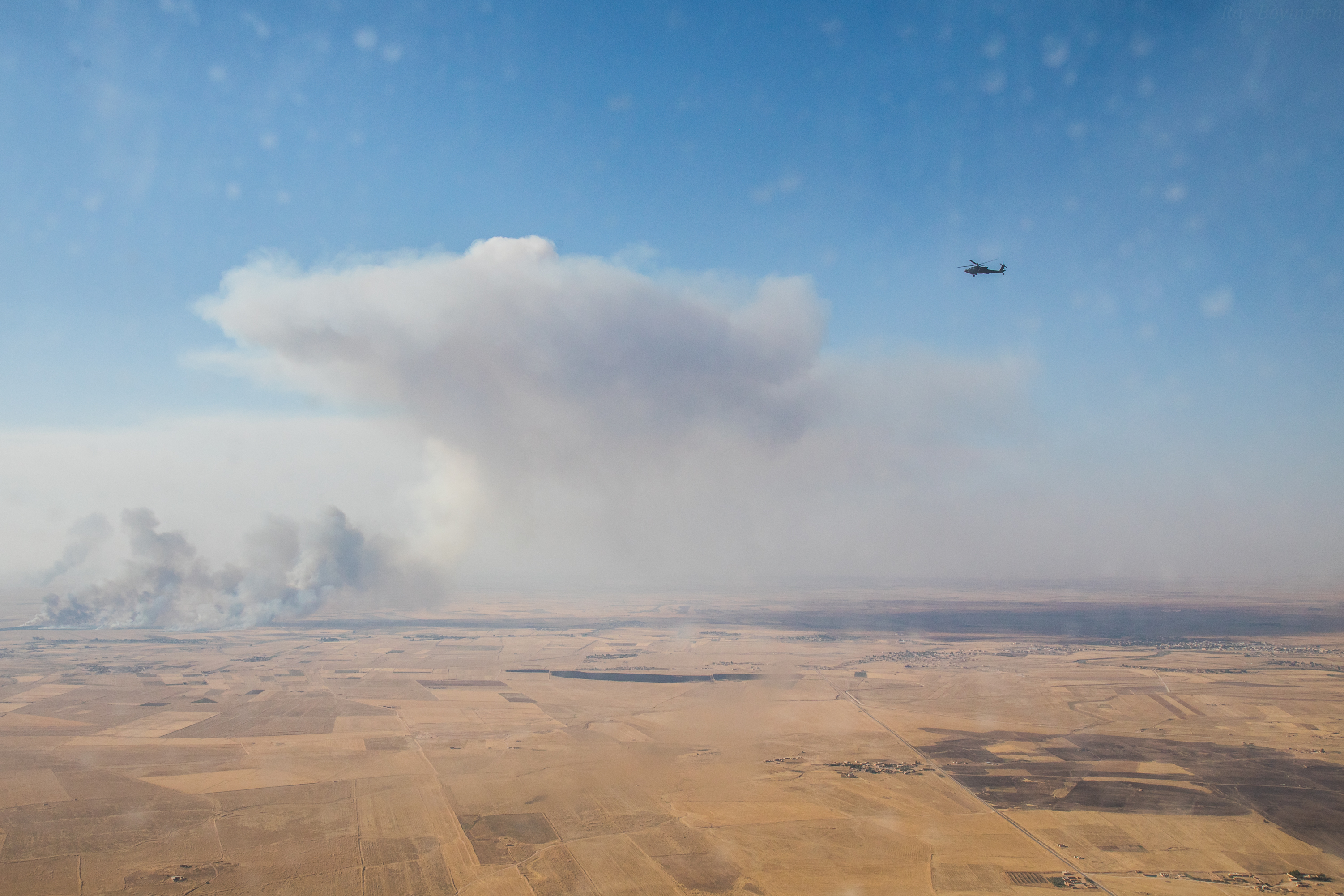
A U.S. AH-64 Apache on an escort mission in northeastern Syria, 22 June 2019

On 30 June 2019, in a rare operation against non-ISIL elements, the U.S. carried out a strike against an al-Qaeda in Syria (AQ-S) leadership meeting at a training facility west of Aleppo, which killed eight jihadists from the Guardians of Religion Organization, including six commanders: two Tunisians, two Algerians, an Egyptian and a Syrian. It was the first known coalition strike in western Syria since February 2017 due to the U.S. and Russia arranging an unofficial deconfliction boundary that largely bars any substantial U.S. forces from venturing into the region. The U.S. did not specify what assets were used in the strike.

In July, U.S. special anti-ISIL envoy James Jeffrey continued to urge Britain, France and Germany to assist the U.S.'s ground mission in Syria. "We want ground troops from Germany to partly replace our soldiers" in the area as part of the anti-Islamic State coalition, Jeffrey told German media.

During a Senate Foreign Relations Committee hearing, Deputy Secretary of Defense for the Middle East Michael Mulroy stated that the SDF has over 2,000 foreign terrorist fighters in custody from over 50 countries—in which they spend quite a bit of time, effort and resources taking care of—and that the U.S. has pushed these countries to take back their citizens. The number of American nationals who joined ISIL on the battlefield is small compared to countries like France and the UK, where several hundred foreign fighters traveled from.

=== August 2019 ===
On 7 August 2019, the U.S. and Turkey reached a framework deal to jointly implement a demilitarized buffer zone in the areas between the Tigris and Euphrates rivers—excluding the Manbij area—in northern Syria. Terms of the deal include joint U.S.-Turkish ground patrols, the relocation of some Syrian refugees into the area, and the withdrawal of heavily armed YPG and YPJ forces and fortifications from the Syria–Turkey border, leaving the areas under SDF military council rule instead. On 24 August, the SDF began dismantling border fortifications under the supervision of U.S. forces. On 27 August, YPG units began withdrawing from Tell Abyad and Ras al-Ayn.

On 31 August, in a second attack against non-ISIL militants in western Syria since June 30, the U.S. carried out a series of airstrikes on a Rouse the Believers Operations Room meeting between Kafriya and Maarrat Misrin, killing over 40 Guardians of Religion militants, including several leaders. Local human rights NGOs reported that 29 civilians were killed in the attack, naming 22, of whom six were children.

=== October 2019: U.S. drawdown from north Syria, return, & al-Baghdadi's death ===
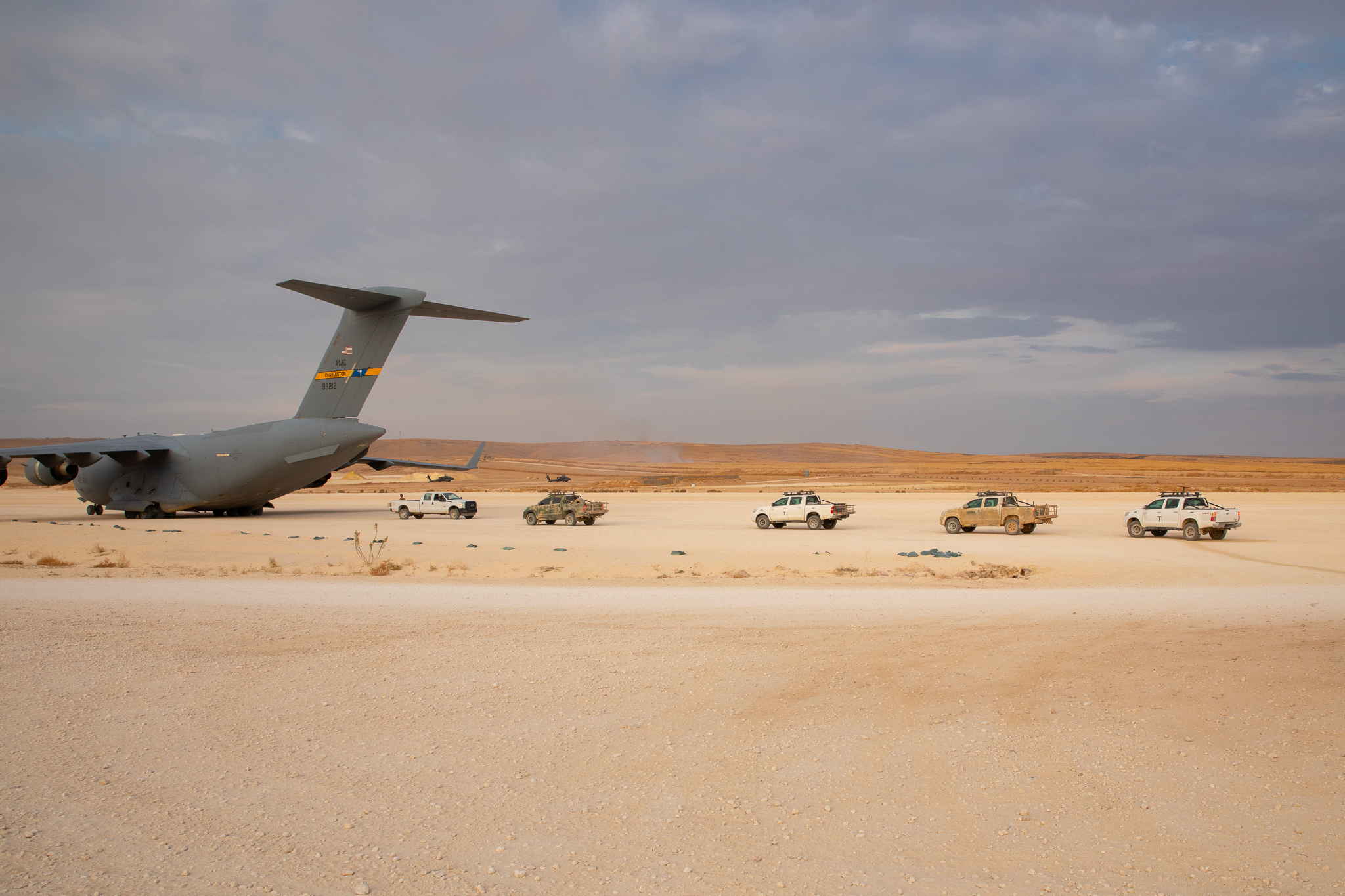
U.S. Non-Standard Tactical Vehicles being loaded unto a C-17 Globemaster III in Kobanî for airlift, 25 October 2019

Following a phone call between U.S. President Trump and Turkish president Recep Tayyip Erdoğan, the White House released a statement on 6 October that Turkey would "soon" be carrying out a planned military offensive into Kurdish-administered northern Syria, so U.S. troops in northern Syria began to withdraw from the area to avoid interference with the offensive. The White House statement also passed responsibility for the area's captured ISIL fighters (held by Kurdish forces) to Turkey. This initial withdrawal involved around 50 troops from two towns along the Syrian border, Tal Abyad and Ras al-Ayn. The sudden withdrawal proved controversial as U.S. Congress members of both parties sharply denounced the move, including Republican allies of Trump such as Senator Lindsey Graham and Mitch McConnell. They argued that the move betrayed the American-allied Kurds, and would only benefit ISIL, Turkey, Russia, Iran and Bashar al-Assad's Syrian regime.

After the U.S. pullout, Turkey launched its ground offensive into Kurdish-controlled areas in northeast Syria on 9 October, spelling the collapse of the Turkey–U.S. Northern Syria Buffer Zone agreement established in August 2019. Secretary of State Mike Pompeo denied that the U.S. had given a "green light" for Turkey to attack the Kurds. However, Pompeo defended the Turkish military action, stating that Turkey had a "legitimate security concern" with "a terrorist threat to their south". On 13 October, Defense Secretary Mark Esper stated that the entire contingent of nearly 1,000 U.S. troops would be withdrawn from northern Syria entirely, because the U.S. learned that Turkey will "likely intend to extend their attack further south than originally planned, and to the west". Hours later, the Kurdish forces, concluding that it would help save Kurdish lives, announced an alliance with the Syrian government and its Russian allies, in a united effort to repel the Turkish offensive.

On 25 October, Mark Esper confirmed the U.S. had partially reversed its Syria pullout and that the U.S. had a new dedicated mission to guard and secure Syrian oil and gas fields and infrastructure, assisted by the deployment of mechanized infantry units. Though the deployment of mechanized units shifted the U.S.'s special forces-led Syria intervention to a more conventional military operation, therefore leaving a heavier U.S. footprint in Syria, Esper stressed that the U.S.'s "core mission" in Syria continued to be defeating ISIL.

==== Death of al-Baghdadi ====
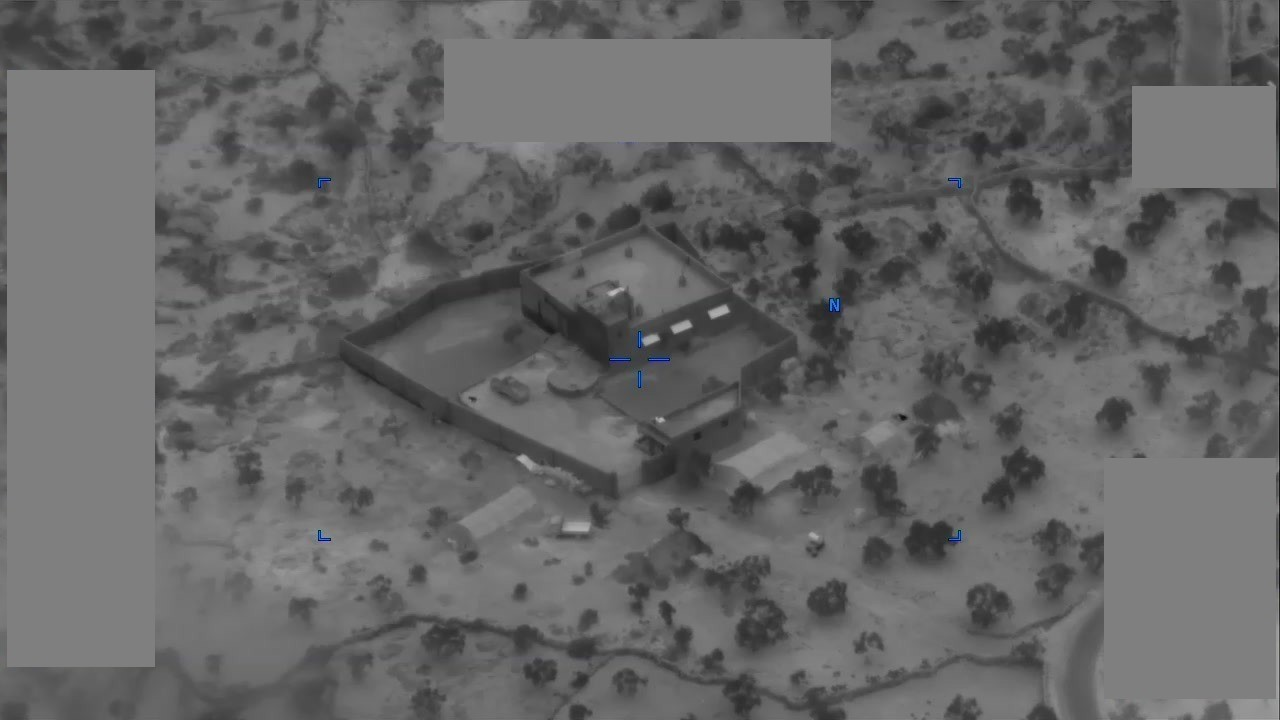
A U.S. drone view of ISIL leader Abu Bakr al-Baghdadi's hideout in Barisha, Idlib before the U.S. special forces raid, 26 October 2019

On 26 October 2019, U.S. Joint Special Operations Command's (JSOC) 1st SFOD-D (Delta Force) conducted a high-profile raid into Idlib Governorate near the border with Turkey that resulted in the death of ISIL leader Abu Bakr al-Baghdadi.

=== November 2019 ===
Observers raised concerns about the potential for deliberate or inadvertent altercations in north and east Syria, as U.S. forces were now operating in close proximity to Russian, Syrian, and Turkish-backed forces in accordance with an 22 October Russian-Turkish "safe zone" arrangement and a prior SDF-Syrian government deal. By November, there had been a steady flow of pictures and videos online showing U.S., Syrian, and Russian forces passing by each other in northern Syria. On 3 November, a U.S. convoy came within one kilometer of a Turkish-backed rebel artillery strike near Tell Tamer, with no U.S. personnel injured.

On 7 November, the Pentagon reiterated that the U.S.'s only mission in Syria is to "defeat ISIS", and that securing Syrian oil fields is "a subordinate task to that mission" by denying ISIL any potential oil revenue. Though ISIL's territory and physical caliphate had been decimated, "We've not said that ISIS as an ideology and ISIS as an insurgency has been eliminated," a Pentagon spokesman stated. The Pentagon also insisted that the revenue from the Syrian oil fields the U.S. is protecting will go to the SDF, not the U.S., despite President Trump raising the possibility in late October of American oil companies taking over the oilfields. On 19 November, a report by the Pentagon Inspector General, citing Defense Intelligence Agency assessments, starkly concluded that the U.S. pullout from most of northern Syria on 6 October and the subsequent 9 October Turkish ground offensive gave ISIL the "time and space" to regroup as a potent transnational terror threat. The report assessed that Turkey's incursion impacted the U.S.'s relationship with the Syrian Kurds, greatly shifted the balance of power in north Syria, and disrupted CJTF-OIR and SDF counter-terrorism operations to the point of giving ISIL ample room to quickly resurge. The report, like the Syria Study Group's May 2019 report, further underscored the differing attitudes of the Trump White House and the intelligence community on the state of the intervention.

On 10 November, in regards to U.S. troop levels in Syria, Chairman of the Joint Chiefs of Staff Mark Milley stated that there will be fewer than 1,000 troops remaining "for sure" and estimated that number would be around 500 to 600; Defense Secretary Mark Esper echoed the 600 estimate three days later, adding that numbers could fluctuate depending on the situation on the ground and the possible increase of European presence in the country. On 23 November, General Kenneth McKenzie, USCENTCOM commander, stated that there were "about 500 U.S. personnel generally east of the Euphrates river east of Deir al Zor up to Hasaka" that were working closely with the SDF and were set to reconvene anti-ISIL operations in coming days and weeks. SDF-U.S. counterinsurgency coordination reportedly recommenced that same day.

Lieutenant Colonel David Olson, a spokesman for the U.S. Third Army, confirmed that the M2 Bradley Fighting Vehicles and many elements of the 30th Armored Brigade Combat Team, particularly elements of the South Carolina Army National Guard's 4th Battalion, 118th Infantry Regiment that were deployed to Syria on 31 October, had been quietly withdrawn and returned to Kuwait by the end of November, remaining less than two months in the country. Olson said approximately 100 members of the 30th ABCT remained in Syria conducting "logistical and support tasks" and that the Bradleys were pulled out because commanders deemed the additional firepower no longer necessary. Observers noted that the deployment of the armored units demonstrated a willingness and ability for the U.S. to deploy heavy armed forces to forward positions in Syria.

=== December 2019 ===
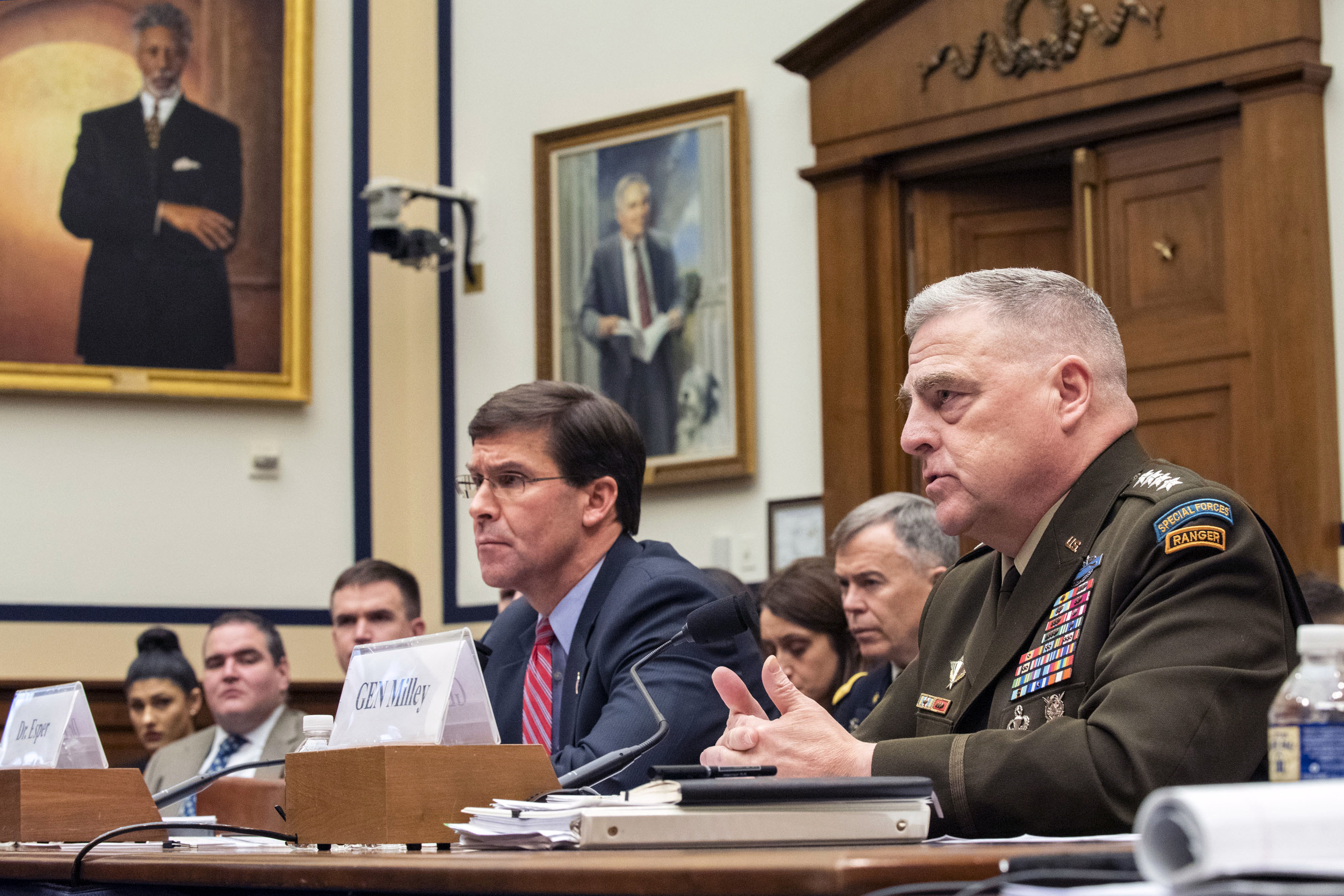
U.S. Defense Secretary Mark Esper and Chairman of the Joint Chiefs of Staff Gen. Mark Milley testify to Congress about the Syria intervention, 11 December 2019

On 3 December, a U.S. coalition drone strike on a minivan in Atme killed two men. Their affiliations were not immediately clear, but one man was reportedly Hay'at Tahrir al-Sham member Abu Ahmad al-Muhajir, a foreign trainer of Tahrir al-Sham's elite "Red Bands" unit. If confirmed, it would be the first reported U.S. strike specifically targeting the group since 2017. The vehicle was relatively intact and not exploded, and the men inside were "mashed" by the impact, leaving some observers to suggest the munition deployed was probably the Hellfire R9X missile, a Hellfire missile variant that uses a kinetic warhead utilizing sword-like blades to kill the target rather than an explosive. The missile is known for its precision kills that reduce collateral damage.

On 4 December, Mark Esper told Reuters that the U.S. had scaled down its presence in northeast Syria and consolidated its forces in the country to a flexible 600 troops, a 40 percent reduction in troop levels since Donald Trump's initial October order to withdraw 1,000; it was not clear if the 600 estimate included the ~200-250 troops at al-Tanf, which would raise the actual total estimate to around 800–850. Esper again suggested that U.S. troop numbers could further decline if more NATO allies volunteered personnel.

Local sources reported that a team of 15 Egyptian and Saudi engineers and technicians arrived at the al-Omar oil field in Deir ez-Zor on 13 December, reportedly tasked by the U.S. with enhancing oil production at the field and training locals to observe oil productivity in the area.

The Syrian Observatory for Human Rights reported that Russian and U.S. soldiers got into a "brawl" in Tell Tamer on 25 December, where a spontaneous meeting between Russian and American troops devolved into a fist fight, "due to their presence in the same area"; no one was reportedly hurt as the incident did not involve weapons. The U.S. troops were reportedly in the area with an interpreter to get to know the opinions of local residents. The Russian Ministry of Defense denied the claims, calling the SOHR report a "hoax".

== 2020 ==
=== January 2020 ===
On 18 January, U.S. troops blocked a Russian convoy from entering Rmelan, where the U.S. is protecting oil fields under SDF control. Tension occurred between the two groups as U.S. soldiers asked the Russian soldiers to return to the Amuda district in northwest of Al-Hasakah Governorate. Tensions between Russian and American forces continued to grow as U.S. troops again blocked a Russian convoy from using a main road between two Kurdish-held towns on 21 January.

On 23 January, in regards to ISIL activity in Iraq and northeastern Syria, ambassador James Jeffrey stated there was no uptick in violence following the U.S. drone strike in Baghdad on 3 January that killed Iranian general Qasem Soleimani. Jeffrey also acknowledged there had been "dustups" between American and Russian troops in Syria, but downplayed the apparent tensions.

On 24 January, U.S. Army Reserve Specialist Antonio Moore of 346th Engineer Company, 363rd Engineer Battalion—a sub-unit of the 411th Engineer Brigade—died when his vehicle rolled over during mine sweeping/route clearance operations at an unspecified location in Deir ez-Zor Governorate. Spc. Moore was on his first deployment after enlisting in May 2017. The U.S. Army had deployed dedicated route clearance combat engineer units in Syria since at least 2017.

=== February–March 2020 ===
On 12 February, a group of Assad government supporters, including civilians and militiamen, blocked a U.S. military convoy in the village of Khirbet Amo, near Qamishli, resulting in clash that left one civilian dead and another injured. A coalition spokesman said the troops fired in self defense and that the incident was under investigation. One U.S. soldier sustained a "minor superficial scratch while operating their equipment." According to the coalition, soldiers issued a series of warnings to de-escalate and then came under small arms fire before firing back.

In early March 2020, NPR's Tom Bowman accompanied an American patrol tasked with protecting oil fields in northeast Syria. He reported on a "multiday" drone attack on two oil fields, the first reported attack of its kind since the U.S. launched its mission to protect them. On 4 March, a drone of an unspecified type dropped a mortar round near where West Virginia National Guard soldiers—operating in Syria as part of the 30th ABCT—were sleeping at an oil field, and on 6 March, drones returned and dropped multiple mortar rounds; no soldiers were injured. The report noted the attacks left noticeable impact craters and "sprayed" oil tanks and at least one military truck. The West Virginian guardsmen reportedly repelled one of the drones, but it was unclear what weapon was used. It also remained unclear who exactly were operating the drones, but Army investigators told Bowman that some of the mortar-like munitions were 3D printed.

=== May–August 2020: Caesar Act, Syrian checkpoint skirmish, and Russian collision incident ===
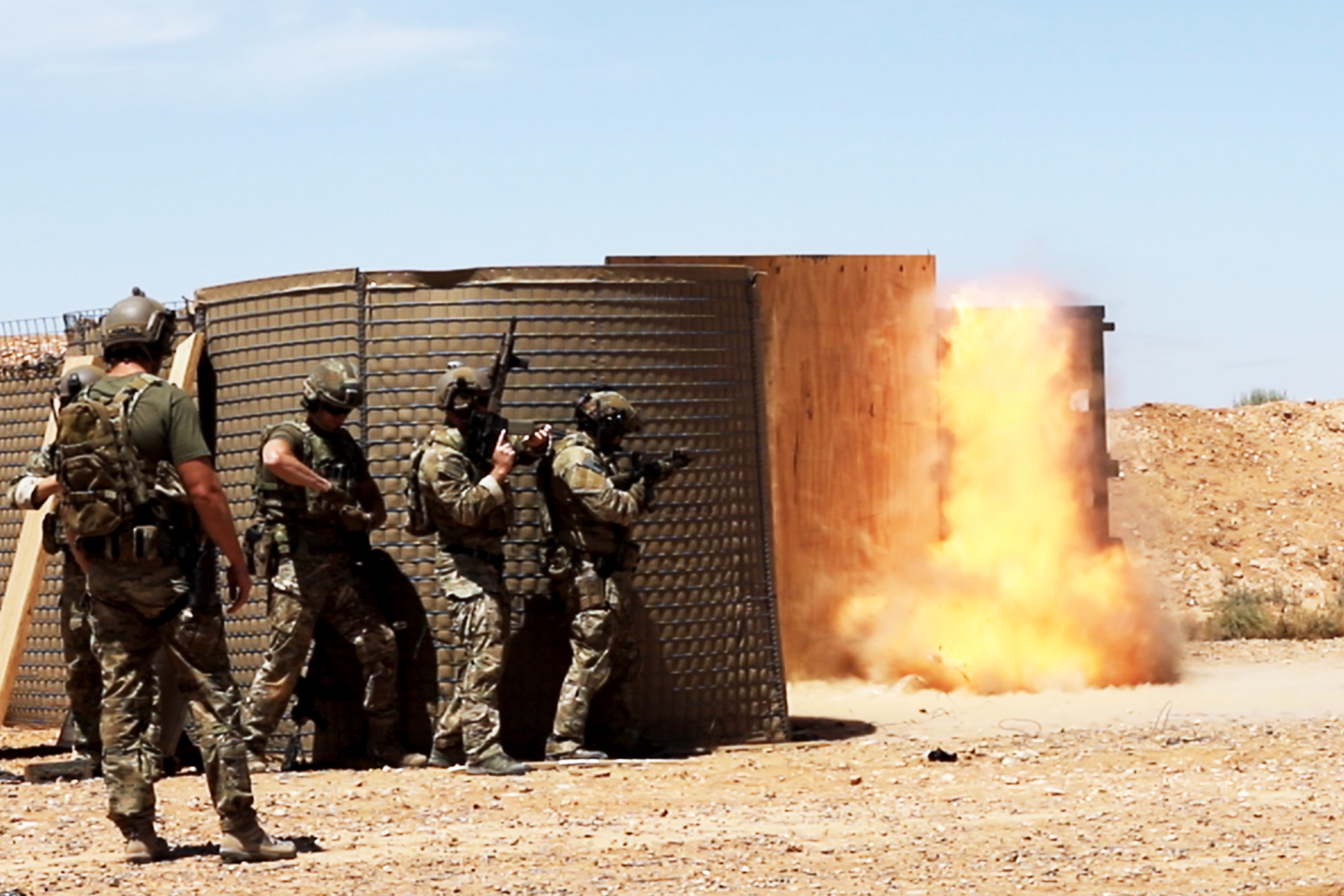
U.S. Green Berets detonate explosives during training at al-Tanf, 27 April 2020

On 30 May, Special Operations Joint Task Force-Operation Inherent Resolve (SOJTF-OIR) released images of special operations forces personnel training at al-Tanf with an advanced optical sighting system, the Israeli-made Smart Shooter SMASH 2000 "smart sight", attached to their M4A1 carbines, suggesting that special operators in Syria were among the first American forces to deploy the system into a real combat zone. It remained unclear if any special operations units had adopted the computerized optic or if the training was part of field trials.

On 14 June, a U.S. coalition drone strike killed Guardians of Religion Organization leaders Khalid al-Aruri and Bilal al-Sanaani who were driving a vehicle in Idlib. There was reportedly no explosion and the target vehicle was relatively intact, with the roof and windshield impacted from above and one side shredded, leading observers to suggest the munition used was probably the kinetic Hellfire R9X missile that uses blades to eviscerate its target rather than an explosive warhead. Ten days later, on 24 June, Abu Adnan al-Homsi, logistics and equipment commander at the Guardians of Religion Organization, was also killed by a U.S. drone strike.

On 17 June, the U.S. imposed the Caesar Act on the Syrian government, regarded as the toughest American sanctions ever imposed on Syria, in a bid to pressure Assad to return to the UN and western-led peace process. The sanctions target Assad's inner circle, including his wife Asma, family members, and Russian and Iranian entities, and freezes the assets of any investors dealing with the country's energy, military, and intelligence agencies and infrastructure. The act was named after the Caesar Report.

On 23 July, Maj. Gen. Christopher Donahue of the 82nd Airborne Division confirmed that a U.S. paratrooper who died in Syria after suffering fatal injuries in a car crash was in fact on "combat deployment." The paratrooper, Sgt. Bryan "Cooper" Mount of St. George, Utah, was said to be on his "second" combat deployment as well.

On 27 July, the Congressional Research Service issued a report, in which they outlined the American strategy in Syria which would aim to achieve: (1) the enduring defeat of the Islamic State; (2) a political settlement to the Syrian civil war; and (3) the withdrawal of Iranian-commanded forces.

In early August 2020, Syria's foreign ministry accused the U.S. and the SDF of stealing Syria's oil, in reference to a recent deal apparently signed by the SDF and an unidentified American company. U.S. Secretary of State Mike Pompeo and Senator Lindsey Graham both publicly acknowledged that the SDF had made an agreement with a U.S. firm to "modernize the oil fields in northeastern Syria". Damascus condemned the agreement as U.S. government-sponsored theft of the country's crude and deemed it "null and void and has no legal basis." There was no immediate response from the SDF or U.S. officials in regards to the ministry's statements.

On 17 August, in the first direct clash since February 2018, Syrian personnel clashed with U.S. troops at a government checkpoint near Tal al-Zahab, in the southern Qamishli countryside where Russian, Syrian and American forces often patrol. According to the SOHR, the Syrian troops refused a U.S. patrol from passing the checkpoint near an air base with a deployed Syrian "combat formation", resulting in an exchange of gunfire after the patrol continued to pass through. The coalition said that its troops returned fire after coming under fire from the checkpoint and then "returned to base" after the gunfight. SOHR and state media said, however, that the patrol was initially repelled but deployed two attack helicopters 30 minutes later to attack the checkpoint with "heavy machine guns", killing one Syrian soldier and injuring two others. The coalition denied that it called in air support and said it launched an investigation into the fatal clash.

On 25–26 August, four U.S. troops were injured in a "chaotic" incident with Russian troops. According to U.S. officials, "at approximately 10 a.m. (Syria Time), August 25," a coalition patrol encountered a Russian patrol near Dayrick, Syria, in which an armored Russian patrol vehicle eventually side-swiped an M-ATV during the interaction, causing four of the crew to suffer concussive-type injuries, described as minor in nature. The coalition patrol then departed the area. Video of the incident posted online showed a tense scene, with Russian military helicopters briefly seen hovering above the American vehicles as well as the armored vehicle collision. The U.S. condemned the "reckless move" that breached "de-confliction protocols, committed to by the United States and Russia in December 2019" and said the Russians had previously agreed to stay out of the area. Chairman of the Joint Chiefs of Staff Mark Milley contacted Chief of the Russian General Staff Valery Gerasimov about the incident, with specific details of the telephone call remaining private.

=== September–November 2020 ===
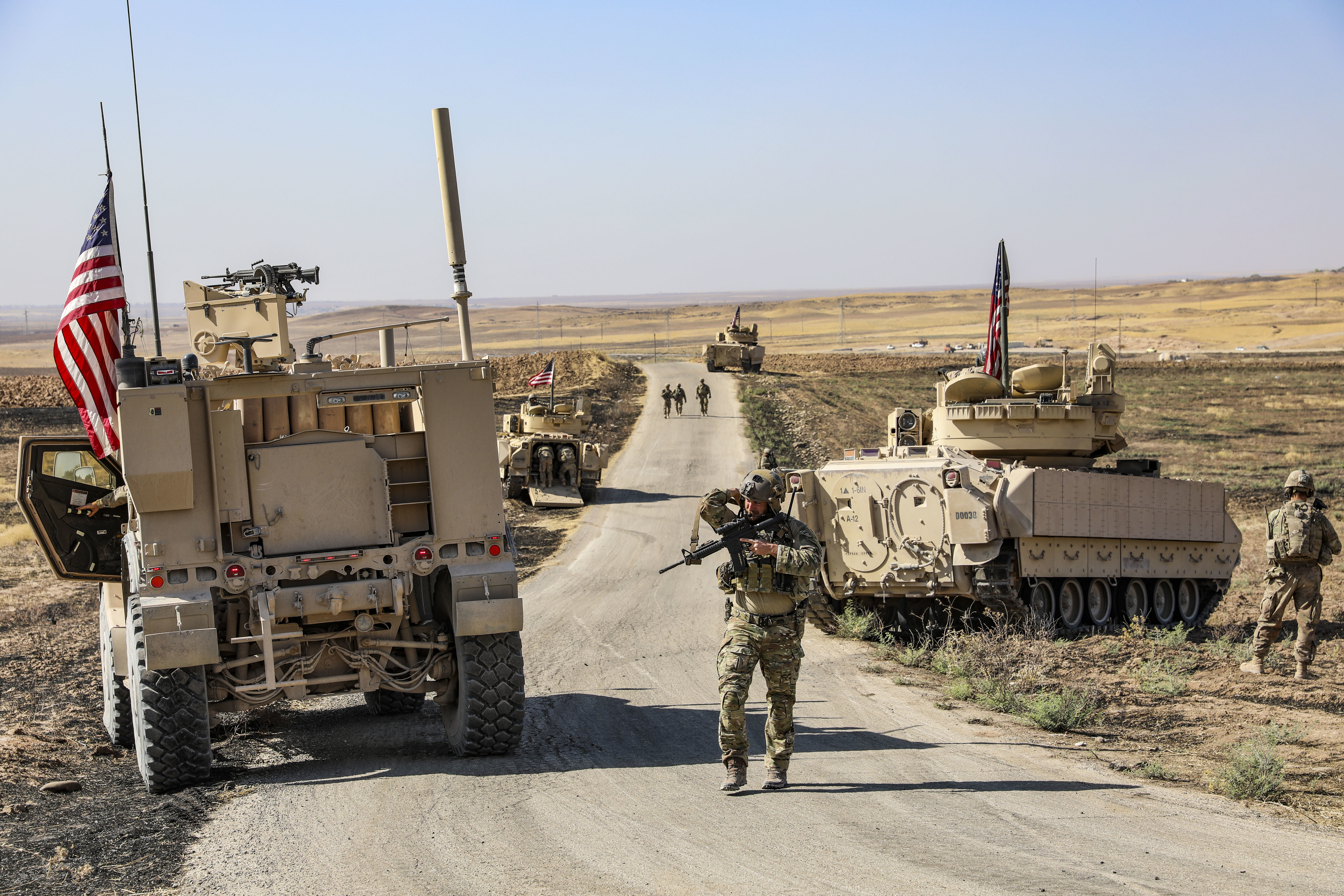
U.S. soldiers patrol near an oil facility in northeastern Syria, 19 October 2020

In September 2020, the U.S. deployed 100 additional troops and six M2A2 Bradley IFVs from the 2nd Brigade Combat Team, 1st Armored Division, based in Kuwait, to north-eastern Syria. Additionally, CENTCOM said an AN/MPQ-64 Sentinel radar was to be deployed and "the frequency of U.S. fighter patrols over U.S. forces" would increase. Some U.S. officials said the reinforcements were in response to recent skirmishes and increasingly belligerent interactions with Russian soldiers in north-eastern Syria, with one official saying the deployment was a "clear signal to Russia" to "avoid unprofessional, unsafe and provocative actions in north-east Syria". "The United States does not seek conflict with any other nation in Syria, but will defend Coalition forces if necessary," said a CENTCOM spokesman. The move was seen specifically as a response to the 26 August incident.

On 15 October, two commanders from the Guardians of Religion Organization, Abu Dhar al-Masri and Abu Yusuf al-Maghribi were killed by a U.S. drone strike.

On 22 October, at least 17 people with reported connections to al-Qaeda were killed by a U.S. airstrike during a dinner gathering in Jakarah, Salqin Subdistrict, Idlib.

It was reported on 30 November that an airstrike near the Iraq–Syria border killed an unidentified Islamic Revolutionary Guard Corps commander and three other men traveling with him from Iraq and into Syria. The vehicle was struck after it entered Syrian territory. Iraqi security and local militia officials said the commander's vehicle had weapons in it and that pro-Iran paramilitary groups helped retrieve the bodies. Sources did not identify the commander nor elaborate on the exact time of the incident. It was not immediately known who conducted the strike, and Reuters could not independently verify the reports.

== 2021 ==
=== February–May 2021 ===
On 21 February 2021, images emerged online of Avenger air defense systems purportedly being transported on a highway between the Iraqi city of Ramadi and the Syrian border. Though it was unclear which military units the Avengers belonged to, when and where the images were taken, and the destination of the reported convoy was uncertain, The War Zone online warfare magazine speculated that the Avengers were being transported to U.S. bases in Syria, where small drone attacks remained a persistent threat to U.S. forces since March 2020, according to officials. Observers suspected the drone attacks, carried out by small commercial drones such as quadcopters, were being conducted either by Iran-backed proxy elements or the Islamic State, which is known for its usage of drone warfare.

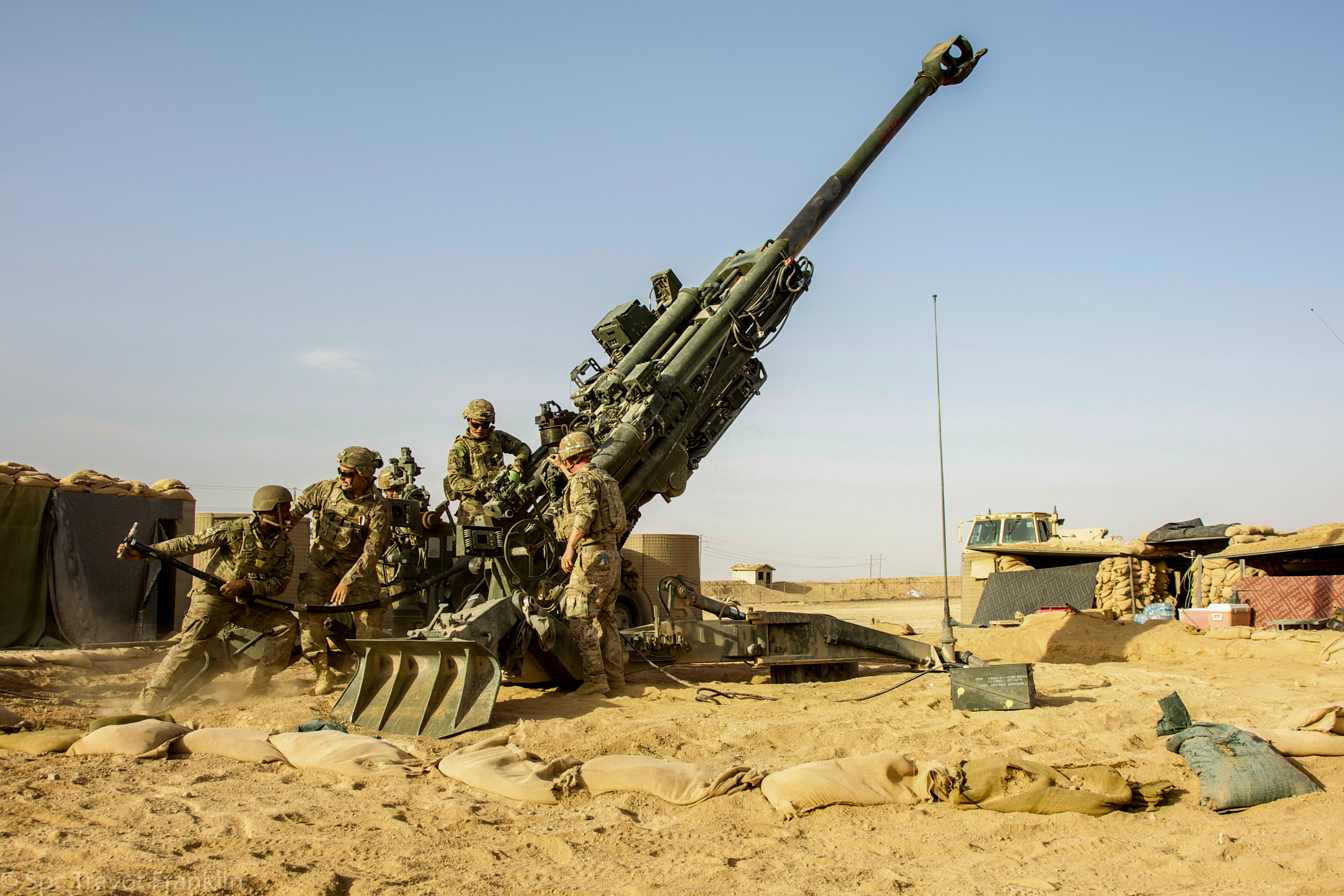
Louisiana National Guard 2nd Battalion, 156th Infantry Regiment, and 2nd Platoon, 1st Battalion, 141st Field Artillery Regiment train with an M777 howitzer at Mission Support Site Conoco, an outpost near the Conoco gas fields in Syria, 14 June 2021

In March 2021, soldiers of the Louisiana National Guard stationed at Mission Support Site Conoco (MSS Conoco)—a makeshift U.S. military outpost established near the Conoco gas field—and another outpost named "Green Village", a base near Mayadin housing U.S. troops in dilapidated apartments once used by oil field workers, soldiers gave some details on their situation on the ground to the media. At Green Village, troops fire a long-range salvo from an M777 howitzer every two weeks into remote areas where ISIL insurgents are believed to be present. At MSS Conoco, a (tattered) U.S. flag is strung between 40-foot-tall gas processing towers in a deliberate display of American presence. "We want them to know we are committed to this region," said one U.S. Army lieutenant.

On 22 April 2021, Politico reported that the Pentagon had been investigating suspected "directed-energy attacks" against U.S. troops in Syria since 2020, and that U.S. officials had identified Russia as a likely culprit. According to officials, in one incident in autumn 2020, several troops developed "flu-like symptoms", and the U.S. Congress's Gang of Eight and Senate Armed Services Committee were briefed on the development. The investigation was reportedly part of a larger Pentagon probe into suspected directed-energy attacks on U.S. personnel around the world. Following the Politico report, General Frank McKenzie, head of U.S. Central Command, testified to the Senate that he had seen "no evidence" of purported directed-energy attacks against U.S. forces in the Middle East.

General Frank McKenzie and deputy commander of CJTF–OIR, British Brig. Gen. Richard Bell, visited four outposts in eastern Syria on 21 May 2021. During the trip, McKenzie met with coalition troops and commanders, along with SDF commander Mazloum Abdi, where, according to Abdi, they discussed security and economic challenges. McKenzie and Bell reiterated the coalition's mission to assist the SDF in combating the ISIL insurgency, but McKenzie said the issue of how long U.S. troops would remain in Syria was up to President Joe Biden. McKenzie also expressed support for Iraq's announced repatriation of 100 families from the Al-Hawl refugee camp, which he said remained a breeding ground for radicalization and a target of ISIL recruitment, despite recent security improvements. In March 2021, the SDF conducted a five day sweeping operation of the camp, arresting 125 suspects.

=== June–November 2021 ===
SOCCENT personnel of Information Warfare Task Force-Central (IWTF-C) drop 42,000 anti-ISIL propaganda leaflets over villages in southeastern Syria, November 2021

On 10 July, a mortar shell landed near MSS Conoco, with no injuries reported. It was reportedly the fourth attack on or near U.S. troops or diplomats within a week, reportedly including one in which two service members were injured. No group claimed responsibility, but U.S. forces suspected Iran-backed proxy militias of carrying out such attacks.

On 20 October, five drones equipped with explosive charges attacked the al-Tanf garrison. There were no reports of injuries. U.S. officials reportedly held Iran and its proxy forces in the region responsible for the attack, with Pentagon Press Secretary John Kirby calling the attack "complex, coordinated and deliberate" and saying it resembled previous attacks by Iran-backed Shia militias. According to an Associated Press report, Iran "resourced and encouraged the attack," but the drones were not launched directly from Iranian territory. It remained unclear if the U.S. was considering retaliation, with Kirby stating "if there is to be a response, it will be at a time and a place and a manner of our choosing, and we certainly won't get ahead of those kinds of decisions." Pro-Iranian media outlets suggested the drone attack was retaliation for a previous attack near Palmyra, which the Axis of Resistance reportedly accused Israel of conducting; U.S. officials denied American forces were involved. Israeli defense sources suggested drone attacks on coalition forces in Syria were part of a larger Iranian-led "expansion campaign".

In mid-November 2021, a New York Times investigation revealed that operations carried out by Talon Anvil, an Air Force special operations unit a part of Task Force 9, resulted in substantial civilian casualties between 2014 and 2019. After the 18 March 2019 Baghuz strike that killed up to 64 civilians was revealed to the public, defense secretary Lloyd Austin asked Gen. Frank McKenzie for a briefing on the strike, which occurred days before McKenzie became CENTCOM commander. Pentagon spokesman John Kirby said the Pentagon was working on two studies on civilian harm, one of which focuses specifically on Syria.

== 2022 ==
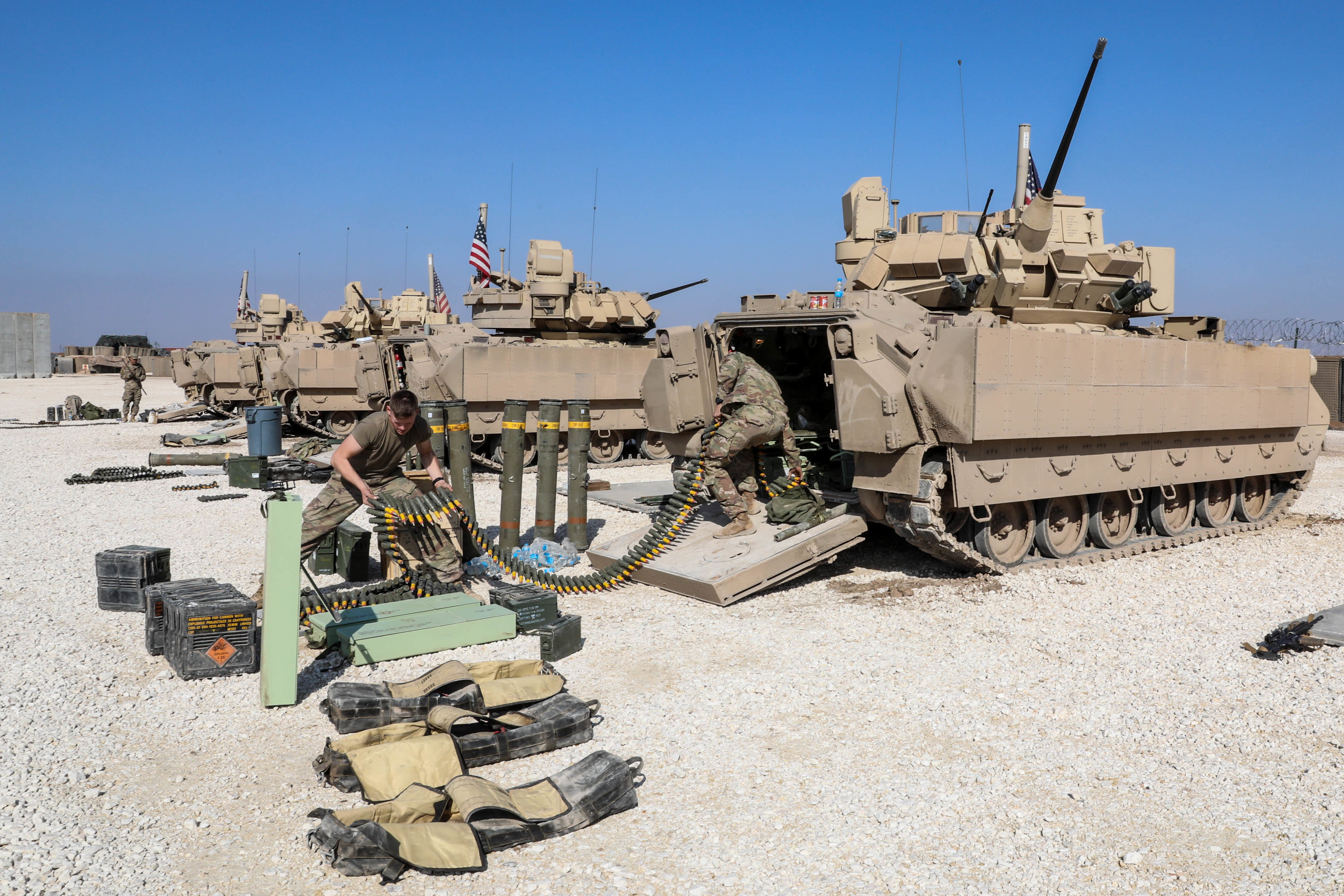
Soldiers of the 1/163rd Combined Arms Battalion, part of the 116th Cavalry Brigade Combat Team, prepare M2A3 Bradley Fighting Vehicles for deployment in northeast Syria, 1 February 2022

=== January–April 2022: Al-Sina'a prison break and death of second ISIL leader ===
On 12 January 2022, the cabinet of German Chancellor Olaf Scholz decided to end the Bundeswehr's anti-ISIL mission in Syria, pending parliamentary approval. German military jets had been flying reconnaissance missions in Syria as part of the coalition until March 2020.

Between 20 and 30 January 2022, a bloody battle occurred in al-Hasakah when ISIL attacked Al Sina'a prison, triggering a violent prison riot that resulted in hundreds of prisoners, including important Emirs, escaping. SDF forces, supported by coalition airstrikes, clashed with ISIL and eventually ended the riot. Over 340 ISIL fighters and over 154 SDF personnel died in the battle, which was the largest ISIL attack since the battle of Baghouz in 2019.

On 3 February, U.S. special operations commandos raided the compound of ISIL leader Abu Ibrahim al-Hashimi al-Qurashi in Atme. During the raid, al-Qurashi detonated a bomb, killing himself and 12 other people, including four women and six children according to the White Helmets. Parallels were drawn to the 2019 raid that killed Abu Bakr al-Baghdadi. Abu Ibrahim al-Hashimi al-Qurashi was succeeded by Abu al-Hasan al-Hashimi al-Qurashi.

On 1 April, U.S. Army General Michael "Erik" Kurilla assumed control of U.S. Central Command from Marine General Frank McKenzie, who retired the same day. Later in the year, in September 2022, Gen. Kurilla urged faster repatriation and reintegration of thousands of ISIL families from the al-Hawl refugee camp, long seen as a breeding ground for Islamic radicalization and ISIL recruiting ground. Kurilla said the current Iraqi repatriation rate of 125-150 families per month was too slow, and said CENTCOM was helping Iraq expedite the transfer of ISIL detainees held in Syria to face trial.

=== June–December 2022: Rocket attacks, continued raids against ISIL, and death of third ISIL leader ===
U.S. raids and strikes against ISIL in Syria reportedly increased in July–December 2022. A report by the Lead Inspector General for Operation Inherent Resolve stated that ISIL conducted 74 attacks in Syria between July and September 2022.

On 27 June, a "kinetic" coalition drone strike in Idlib Governorate killed senior Hurras al-Din leader Abu Hamzah al-Yemeni as he traveled alone on a motorcycle, with CENTCOM stating he was a Yemeni citizen and that initial review indicated there were no civilian casualties in the strike. The White Helmets said the strike occurred just south of rebel-held Idlib city and that he was the only fatality in the strike, with his body being handed over to local morgue officials.

On 12 July, the U.S. announced top ISIL operative Maher al-Agal was killed and an unidentified associate was injured in a drone strike on their motorcycle in northwest Syria, near Jindires. Al-Agal was one of five top ISIL figures in Syria and Iraq, and he "aggressively" built the group's networks outside of the region, according to the U.S. military. The White Helmets said the strike occurred in the village of Khaltan and said al-Agal's associate later died from their wounds. CENTCOM announced on 6 October that ISIL weapons smuggler Wahid al-Shammri was killed in a U.S. helicopter raid in a village in northeast Syria, in Syrian government-held territory.

U.S. forces strike targets in Deir ez-Zor, 24 August 2022

On 15 August, drones allegedly launched by Iranian-backed militias struck the al-Tanf base, resulting in "zero casualties and no damage" according to CENTCOM. According to a CENTCOM press release, between 24 and 25 August, more rocket attacks targeted the coalition's MSS Conoco and MSS "Green Village" bases in Deir ez-Zor governorate, prompting coalition forces to respond with M777 artillery, AH-64 Apache attack helicopters, and AC-130 gunship strikes against "Iran-affiliated militants" in the area, killing four enemy fighters and destroying seven rocket launchers. CENTCOM spokesman, Colonel Joe Buccino, called the 24 August strikes "proportionate, deliberate action intended to limit the risk of escalation and minimise the risk of casualties" but did not identify the targets nor provide casualty figures. SOHR and activist collective DeirezZor 24 said pro-Syrian government Liwa Fatemiyoun's Ayash Camp was the target and that at least six Syrian and foreign militants were killed in the strikes.

At approximately 7:05 pm on 18 September, three 107mm rockets launched by an unidentified group struck MSS Green Village, causing no injuries or damage. A fourth rocket was discovered at the launch site, located 5 km away from the base, according to CENTCOM.

On the night of 5 October, U.S. special operations forces conducted a helicopter raid near Qamishli, killing an ISIL official named Rakkan Wahid al-Shammri and injuring one of his associates. According to U.S. officials, al-Shammri smuggled weapons and fighters into Syria for ISIL. The raid was reportedly unilateral—it did not involve coalition personnel—and Russia was not notified via the de-confliction line prior to the operation due to the location and sensitivity of the operation. The next day, on 6 October at 6:23 pm local time, a U.S. airstrike in northern Syria killed two senior ISIL operatives: Abu 'Ala, the deputy leader of ISIL in Syria, and Abu Mu'Ad al-Qahtani, an ISIL official responsible for prisoner affairs. No U.S. personnel were injured and, according to an initial assessment, there were no civilian casualties. According to two U.S. defense officials, CENTCOM spent over 1,000 hours gathering intelligence on the targets in order to limit collateral damage. Syrian state media reported that the operation had killed one person and accused U.S. forces of having "kidnapped" several people.

On 10 October, CENTCOM stated that a 107mm rocket launched by an unidentified group struck the coalition landing zone in Rmelan without causing damage or injuries, and additional rockets were found at the launch site. On 17 November, rockets again targeted MSS Green Village, causing no injuries or damage.

On 20 November, after Turkish authorities implicated the PKK (and SDF) for a terrorist attack in Istanbul, Turkey launched cross-border air, drone, and artillery strikes into northern Syria against Kurdish positions, with at least one strike landing within 150 yards of American personnel. In response, U.S. commanders restricted joint ground operations with the SDF. The Pentagon later announced the resumption of expanded joint ground operations on 6 December.

Abu al-Hasan al-Hashimi al-Qurashi, the third leader of ISIL, killed himself with a suicide vest during an operation conducted by former Free Syrian Army rebels in Daraa Governorate in mid-October. The death was publicly confirmed by ISIL on 30 November.

Between 8 and 16 December, U.S. troops and the SDF conducted six joint operations that captured five suspected ISIL operatives allegedly planning to attack the Al-Hawl refugee camp. On 11 December, 2:57 am local time, U.S. forces carried out a helicopter raid in eastern Syria which resulted in the deaths of two senior ISIL commanders, including an ISIL Syria Province Official identified only as "Anas." CENTCOM announced on 20 December that U.S. troops conducted three helicopter raids in the previous 48 hours, capturing six suspected ISIL operatives, including ISIL Syria Province Senior Official "al-Zubaydi" who allegedly facilitated ISIL attacks in Syria. "Preliminary indications" suggested there were no civilian casualties in the raids.

On 29 December 2022, CENTCOM reported U.S. forces in Syria carried out 108 missions alongside the SDF and 14 "unilateral" operations throughout 2022, killing 466 and capturing 215 suspected ISIL operatives, with no U.S. troops killed or wounded in the region. U.S. Air Forces Central Command declined to specify how many air missions were conducted in Syria in 2022. CENTCOM commander Michael Kurilla stated 20,000 suspected ISIL militants continued to be held prisoner inside Syria, and cautioned about the Al-Hawl refugee camp remaining a potential hub for recruitment and ISIL radicalization.

== 2023 ==
=== January–February 2023 ===
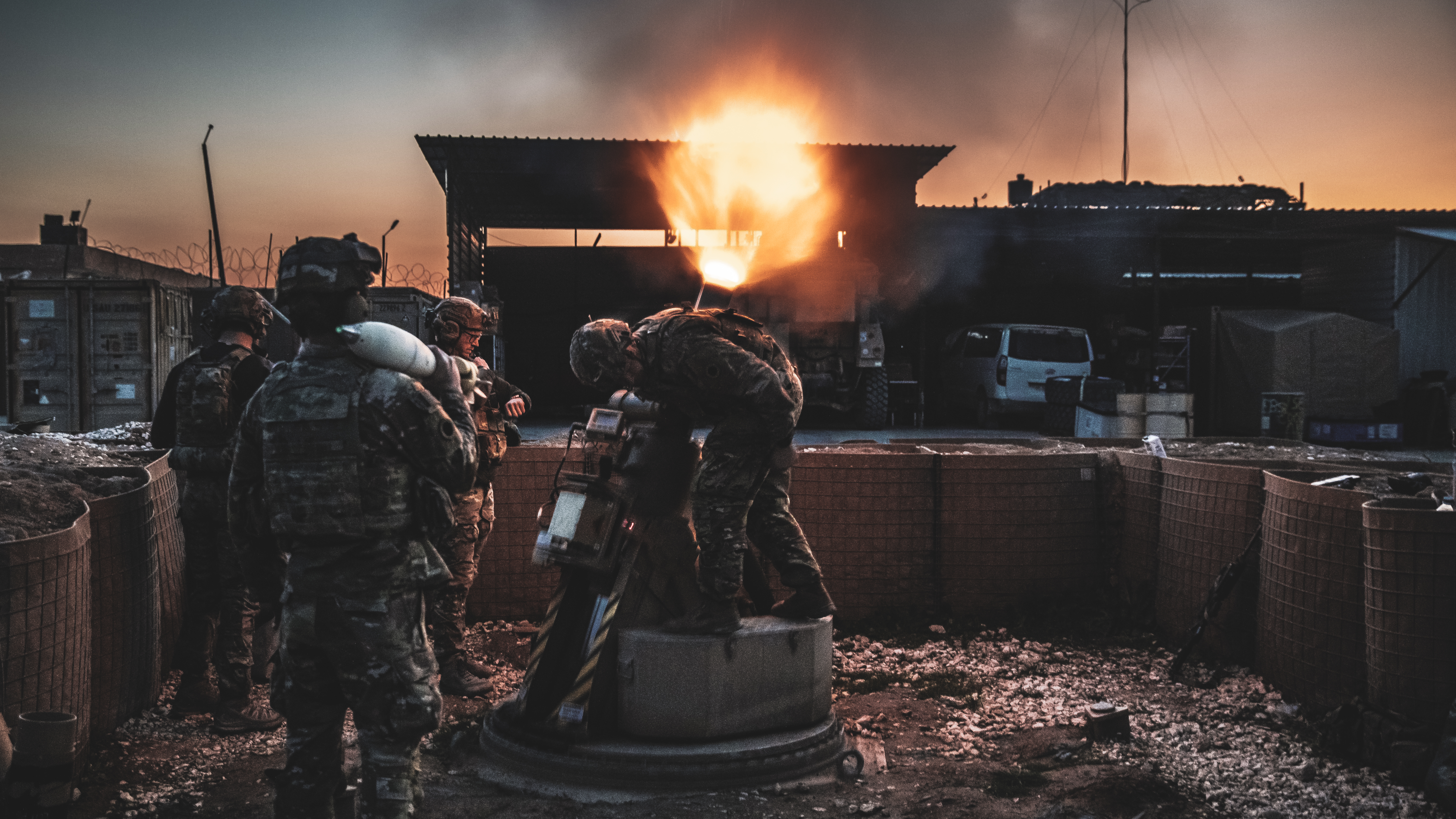
Coalition personnel fire illumination rounds from an XM905 AMPS inside a firebase in al-Shaddadah, February 2023

Russian SU-34 and SU-35 jets drop flares in the flight path of a U.S. MQ-9 Reaper over Syria, 6 July 2023

U.S. Central Command stated that at approximately 9:00 am local time on 4 January 2023, two rockets targeted Mission Support Site Conoco, resulting in no injuries or damage. The SDF discovered a third rocket at the launch site that was not fired. CENTCOM spokesman Col. Joe Buccino said "Attacks of this kind place coalition forces and the civilian populace at risk and undermine the hard-earned stability and security of Syria and the region."

The SDF stated on 6 January that it had arrested 154 "wanted terrorists ... and criminals," in a sweep and raid operation in eastern Syria known as Operation Al-Jazeera Thunderbolt. After sweeping 55 villages and farms, including along the Iraq–Syria border, the SDF arrested 102 suspected ISIL sleeper cell members and 27 individuals accused of supporting ISIL logistics and propaganda efforts. The SDF said the operation was conducted alongside coalition forces, but the coalition did not confirm this.

According to CENTCOM, a joint U.S.-SDF helicopter assault in eastern Syria on 18 January captured an ISIL media and security operative involved in global recruiting and facilitating ISIL attacks outside of the region. Two days later, on 20 January, three "one-way attack drones" attacked the al-Tanf garrison, with two of the drones being shot down and the third striking the base, injuring two Syrian Free Army personnel but no American personnel. The coalition did not identify the type of drones used, and no group immediately claimed responsibility for the attack. The next day, 21 January, a joint U.S.-SDF raid in eastern Syria captured two ISIL facilitators. According to CENTCOM, one of the militants was a logistics specialist and the other was an ISIL "associate". The same day, the Canadian government agreed to repatriate 23 of its citizens linked to ISIL, including British-born ISIL terrorist Jack Letts.

In February 2023, CENTCOM announced that on the second day of each month it would publish an accounting of operations against ISIL from the previous month. The CENTCOM report on 2 February stated that the coalition conducted ten joint anti-ISIL operations with the SDF in January 2023, killing two ISIL operatives and detaining 198. CENTCOM commander Gen. Michael "Erik" Kurilla reiterated that ISIL's "vile ideology remains uncontained and unconstrained" and that the U.S. remained committed to fighting the group indefinitely. Coalition commander Maj. Gen. Matthew McFarlane commended the "competence, professionalism, and dedication of our Iraqi, Syrian, and coalition partner forces."

CENTCOM tweeted on 10 February that a joint raid in Syria killed "Ibrahim Al Qahtani, an ISIS official associated with planning ISIS detention center attacks," and resulted in the seizure of "multiple weapons, ammo, and a suicide belt."

On the afternoon of 14 February, U.S. troops at MSS Conoco shot down an Iranian-made reconnaissance drone that was flying over the base. No group immediately claimed responsibility for operating the drone.

During another joint U.S.-SDF helicopter raid in northeast Syria on the night of 16 February, four U.S. servicemen and a military working dog were wounded when senior ISIL leader Hamza al-Homsi detonated an explosion as they approached his position. It was initially unclear if the explosion was caused by a booby trap, suicide vest or from another source. Al-Homsi was the only ISIL member killed or captured during the raid and no SDF or civilians were injured, according to CENTCOM. The wounded dog and three of the U.S. personnel were in stable condition and being treated in a medical facility in Iraq, while the fourth service member suffered minor injuries and had returned to duty. The same night of the al-Homsi raid, a separate raid in Syria "resulted in the death of an ISIS assassination cell leader," according to CENTCOM.

CENTCOM reported it carried out 15 joint anti-ISIL operations and two unilateral operations in Syria throughout February 2023, killing five ISIL operatives and capturing 11. CENTCOM also stated it had sent over 300,000 pounds of humanitarian aid to the crisis area following the Turkey–Syria earthquakes by 22 February.

=== March–April 2023 ===
On 23 March, U.S. president Joe Biden authorized U.S. forces to conduct a retaliatory air strike in Syria in response to a kamikaze drone attack on a coalition base at Abu Hajar Airport. The drone was allegedly of Iranian origin and the airstrike targeted what the U.S. said was Islamic Revolutionary Guard Corps (IRGC)-linked military posts in the Mayadin and Abu Kamal countryside and a weapons depot in the Harabish neighborhood of Deir ez-Zor, killing 14 people, including nine Syrians, according to SOHR. Between 24 and 25 March, ten rockets attacked MSS Green Village and a secondary rocket attack targeted U.S. troops at or near MSS Conoco. An unidentified U.S. official said the attacks were coordinated and showed a "higher level of sophistication" than previous attacks on U.S. garrisons in the country. By 13 April, it was confirmed that at least 25 U.S. personnel were injured (including at least 12 traumatic brain injuries) during the clashes and one U.S. contractor was killed during the initial airport drone attack. Weeks later, at approximately 5:51 pm local time on 10 April, another rocket attack targeted MSS Conoco, however no personnel were injured and no damage was done to the base as only a single rocket was launched. An additional rocket was found at the attack's point of origin, according to CENTCOM.

Throughout March 2023, CENTCOM reported conducting nine joint anti-ISIL operations, killing two and detaining 11 ISIL operatives.

On 4 April, a coalition drone strike on the outskirts of Killi, north of Idlib, killed Khalid 'Aydd Ahmad al-Jabouri, who CENTCOM said was a senior ISIL leader that developed ISIL's leadership structure. The White Helmets said they responded to the scene of the strike, taking him "to Bab Al-Hawa Hospital, where he died."

=== October–December 2023: Increased proxy attacks on U.S. bases ===
U.S. precision airstrike on a building in Deir ez-Zor, 8 November 2023. The Pentagon stated it was an IRGC weapons depot.

On 26 October, U.S. warplanes targeted two facilities in eastern Syria it said was being used by the IRGC and its proxy forces in response to the series of attacks on U.S. forces in the region.

On 8 November, in a second retaliatory strike, two U.S. F-15E Strike Eagles bombed a building in the Maysulun neighborhood of Deir ez-Zor that, according to the U.S., was a weapons storage facility used by the IRGC that stored weapons believed to be used in recent attacks on U.S. forces. According to Secretary of Defense Lloyd Austin, the "precision self-defense strike" was in response to "a series of attacks against U.S. personnel in Iraq and Syria by IRGC-Quds Force affiliates" and was ordered by President Joe Biden. The Syrian Observatory for Human Rights claimed that nine workers of the facilities were killed in the strikes.

== 2024 ==
The U.S. launched airstrikes on 75 Islamic State targets on 9 December to prevent the group from making a resurgence in Syria following the fall of Bashar al-Assad.

On 31 December, Iranian Brigadier General Behrouz Esbati, a senior commander of the IRGC, delivered a speech at the Vali-e-Asr Mosque in Tehran in which he candidly admitted that the fall of Assad was a major strategic defeat for Iran. General Esbati revealed that relations had been strained throughout 2024 after Assad refused to let Iranian elements attack Israel from Syria and said Assad ignored efforts to reform, making his fall inevitable. Esbati also accused Russia of allowing Israeli attacks on Iranian targets in Syria by "turning off radars". Esbati added that advanced U.S. defense systems (and fear of American retaliation) was the reason Iran was not launching normal missile attacks on U.S. bases. He vowed to foment a pro-Iranian insurgency in post-Assad Syria, though the realism of this objective remained questionable due to continued Israeli operations in the country.

== 2025 ==
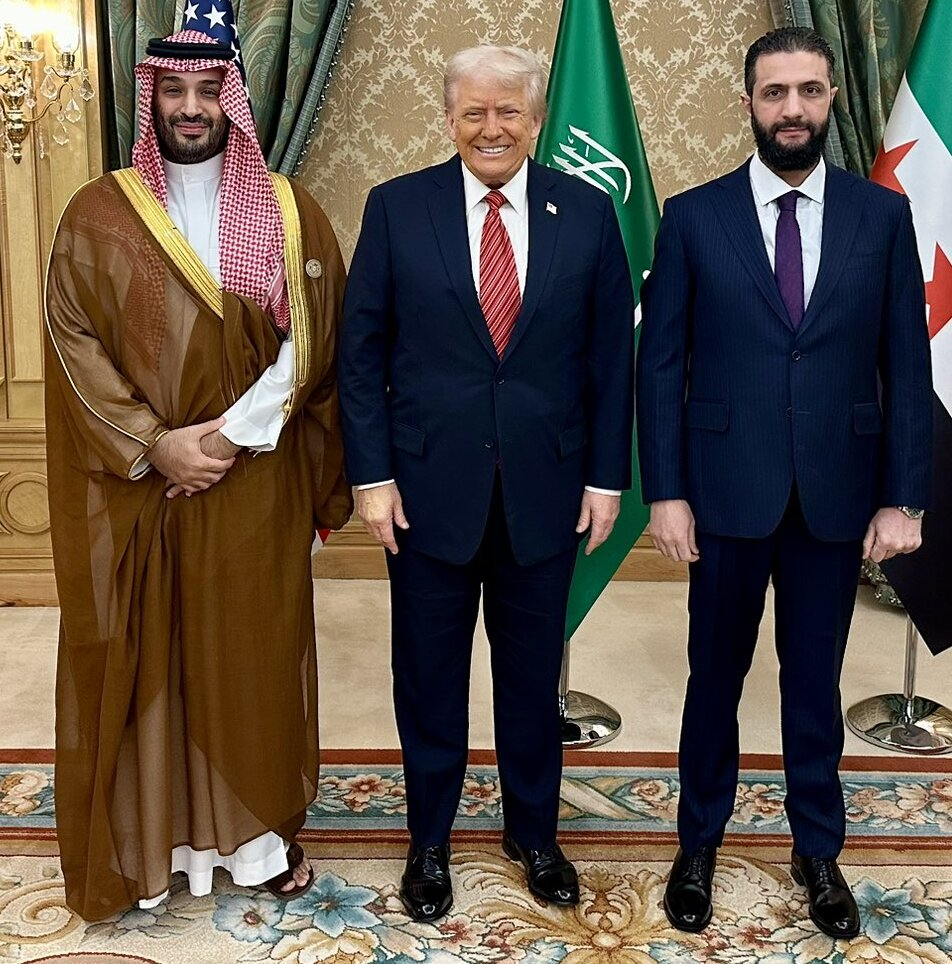
U.S. President Donald Trump and Syrian president Ahmed al-Sharaa alongside Crown Prince of Saudi Arabia Mohammed bin Salman in Riyadh, Saudi Arabia, 14 May 2025

The U.S.-led coalition continued anti-ISIL operations into 2025. On 2-3 January, U.S. forces assisted the SDF in attacking ISIL forces in Deir ez-Zor, resulting in the capture of a local ISIL attack cell leader.

On 5 January, Asaad al-Shaibani, Syria's new foreign minister under the HTS-led caretaker government, urged the United States to lift sanctions against the country to help facilitate recovery efforts. The next day, on 6 January, the U.S. Treasury Department allowed humanitarian groups to operate more freely in Syria without violating U.S. sanctions for the next six months under "General License 24". However, U.S. sanctions remained in place.

On 8 January, Sebastian Gorka, the incoming Senior Director for Counterterrorism under the second Trump administration, said British nationals held in Syrian prison camps for joining ISIL should be allowed to return to the UK, reiterating that repatriation is also part of the anti-ISIL effort.

On 25 July, U.S. Central Command announced the execution of senior Islamic State leader Diaa Zoubaa Musleh Al-Hardani along with his two sons in a strike on Al-Bab, Aleppo Governorate, Syria.

== See also ==
- Foreign interventions by the United States
- Military intervention against the Islamic State of Iraq and the Levant
  - American-led intervention in Iraq (2014–2021)
- Military of ISIL
  - List of wars and battles involving ISIL
- Foreign involvement in the Syrian Civil War
- Cities and towns during the Syrian Civil War
- Opposition–ISIL conflict during the Syrian Civil War
- Iraqi insurgency (2011–2013)
- 2015 Egyptian military intervention in Libya
- Syria–United States relations
- Russian intervention in the Syrian civil war
- Timeline of the Syrian Civil War (August 2014–present)
- List of United States attacks on the Syrian government during the Syrian Civil War
- List of United States special forces raids during the Syrian Civil War
