= CIAR =

CIAR may refer to:

- Canadian Institute for Advanced Research, a virtual institute dedicated to collaborative advanced research and scholarship of relevance to the Canadian and global community
- Center for Indoor Air Research, a non-profit organization established by the tobacco industry in 1988
- Cornell International Affairs Review, a biannual, peer-reviewed student-run academic journal at Cornell University
- Rozas Airborne Research Center (Centro de Investigación Aeroportada de Rozas), an aerodrome in Castro de Rei, Galicia, Spain
