= Hêzên Komandos =

- SDF Commandos receiving CQB (close quarters combat) training from U.S. Army personnel
- Active: 2020–2026
- Country: Syria
- Allegiance: Autonomous Administration of North and East Syria
- Type: Counterinsurgency
- Role: Counterterrorism; High-Value Target Raids; Clearance Operations Operations
- Size: 1,120+ personnel
- Part of: Syrian Democratic Forces
- Equipment: Small arms, military vehicles (assisted by U.S. training and equipment)
- Engagements: Syrian Civil War; Eastern Syria insurgency; Battle of al-Hasakah (2022); Manbij offensive (2024); East Aleppo offensive (2024–2025); SDF–Syrian transitional government clashes (2025–2026)

Commanders
- Commander: Lieutenant Dilovan Kovli

The Hêzên Komandos (lit. 'Commando Forces', Arabic: قوات الكوماندوس) were a counterinsurgency force within the Syrian Democratic Forces, trained and equipped by the U.S. Department of Defense. The force primarily targeted the Islamic State in high-value target raids and clearance operations.

== History ==
Hêzên Komandos has been in existence since at least 2020, while earlier Syrian Democratic Forces “commando” units have existed since at least 2018. In 2020, the Commando Forces reportedly raided 56 sites in a single anti-ISIS operation in Deir Ezzor, with support from the International Coalition.

On 25 February 2021, the Commandos raided illegal river crossings on the Euphrates used by smugglers.

The Syrian Democratic Forces deployed the Commando Forces to suppress the al-Sina’a Prison break in 2022.

On 5 February 2024, six members of the Hêzên Komandos were killed within a Syrian Democratic Forces training academy near the al-Omar Oil Fields, when an Iranian attack drone launched by the Islamic Resistance in Iraq (IRI) from Syrian Government territory struck the facility.

In late 2024 and early 2025, the Komandos defended Kurdish-held territory during the Manbij offensive and East Aleppo offensive.

Komando units took part in clashes with the newly formed Syrian transitional government throughout 2025.

== Support by U.S.-led Coalition ==
SDF Commandos undergo stress-fire training with U.S. Army personnel.

Hêzên Komandos are officially trained and armed by the U.S. Department of Defense, which describes the unit as “the Syrian Democratic Forces premier counterterrorism strike force.”

The United States Department of Defense has assessed that “Syrian Democratic Forces Commando units can effectively conduct detention operations, maneuvers, patrols, and large-scale clearance operations.”

By February 2020, the Department of Defense had a two-year plan in place to train 1,120 Syrian Democratic Forces Commandos. As of 2023, the department continues to assist in training and equipping five Commando “companies.”

== See also ==
- Anti-Terror Units (YAT)
- Asayish
