= Eastern Syria insurgency =

2017–2026 military conflict

- Part of the Rojava conflict, the Syrian civil war and the Aftermath of the Syrian civil war
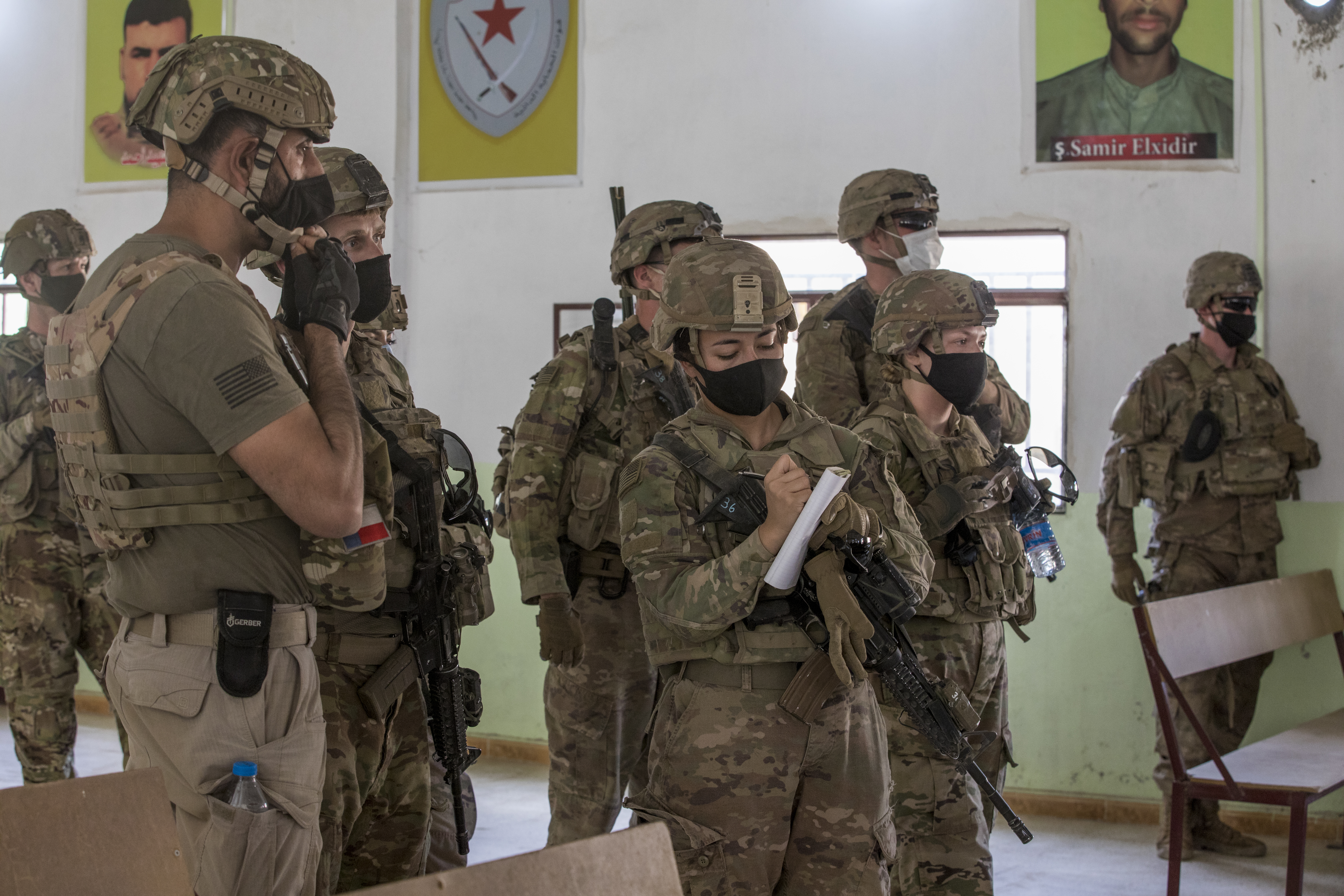
- SDF training facility visited by U.S. soldiers during the insurgency, 22 April 2021
Date	11 October 2017 – 30 January 2026 (8 years, 10 months and 9 days)
Location	Portions of eastern Syria
Result	Syrian transitional government victory
Territorial changes	Integration of the eastern governorates into the Syrian state

Belligerents
Islamic State; Wilayat al-Sham; Assad loyalists Supported by: Ba'athist Syria (surrendered) Iran (alleged; until 6 December 2024) (surrendered); Iraq (alleged); Syria (since 2024); Syrian Armed Forces; (Syrian opposition) SNA (until 2025); (Syrian opposition) Ahrar al-Sharqiya; Gathering of the Eastern Martyrs; Harakat al-Qiyam; Revolutionaries in the Land of Deir ez-Zor; Special Tasks Battalion; Pro-opposition tribes; Anti-SDF Arab tribes: Arab Tribal and Clan Forces; Supported by: Turkey; Hurras al-Din (al-Qaeda loyalists; until 2025)	DAANES; Syrian Democratic Forces; Self-Defence Forces (HXP); Internal Security Forces (Asayish); Pro-SDF Arab tribes; CJTF–OIR; United States; France; United Kingdom; Canada; Germany; Saudi Arabia; PKK (claimed by Turkey, ISIL and the Popular Resistance)

Commanders and leaders
Thabit Sobhi Fahd Al-Ahmad †; Mohammed Remedan Eyd al-Talah (POW)	Mazloum Abdi; Eric T. Hill

Units involved
Military of ISIL; Insurgent forces; Army of the Security Forces; Sleeper cells; Ba'athist Syria loyalists; Popular Resistance in Raqqa; Popular Resistance in Hasakah (surrendered); Popular Resistance in Manbij (surrendered); Supported by: IRGC (alleged); Quds Force; Popular Mobilization Forces (alleged); Arab Tribal and Clan Forces	Syrian Democratic Forces; YPG; YPJ; Anti-Terror Units; Internal Security Forces; CJTF–OIR; Special Operations Joint Task Force (SOJTF)

Strength
Unknown, probably thousands	60,000–75,000 (2017 est.) (United States) c. 2,000 (2018 est.)

Casualties and losses
225 killed, 107 captured (2018–2025) 1 killed, 3 injured	1,404 killed (vs IS; Aug. 2018 – 2025); 6 captured 2 injured 7 killed 2 injured 10 killed (United States) 3 killed (Syria) 3 injured
- 727 civilians killed (Aug. 2018 - 2025)

The Eastern Syria insurgency was an armed insurgency waged by remnants of the Islamic State and both pro- and anti-Ba'athist Syria Arab nationalist insurgents against the Autonomous Administration of North and East Syria (AANES), its military (the Syrian Democratic Forces (SDF)), and their allies in the US-led Combined Joint Task Force – Operation Inherent Resolve (CJTF–OIR) coalition.

== Background ==
The insurgency began after a series of campaigns in 2016 and 2017 which took territory from the Islamic State of Iraq and the Levant, led by the Syrian Democratic Forces and the CJTF-OIR. This eventually resulted in the taking of the Islamic State capital of Raqqa, and other areas in the Aleppo, Raqqa and Deir ez-Zor Governorates. These are Arab-majority areas, often with large Turkmen minorities, some of whom resented the Kurdish influence in the SDF.

Multiple factions, made up mostly of Arabs, have formed armed groups in support of either the Syrian opposition or the Ba'athist Syrian government, with additional Islamic State remnants operating as clandestine cells who have emerged in areas captured by the SDF and the coalition during the 2016-2017 campaigns. These groups have also utilized guerilla tactics to target the SDF and Coalition forces, including assassinations, hit and run attacks, rocket attacks and use of improvised explosive devices (IEDs). Attacks have occurred in cities across Rojava, including Manbij, Raqqa and Hasakah.

== Insurgent factions ==
- Islamic State of Iraq and the Levant: Following the loss of most of its territory, the Islamic State of Iraq and the Levant has launched a desert-based insurgency, while simultaneously attempting to rally elements of the civilian population to its cause. By attacking SDF-backed civil authorities, it undermines the latter's reputation and worsens existing grievances, resulting in a deteriorating security situation. It is unclear how many active ISIL fighters still operate in Syria, but the number is likely to be several thousands.
- Assad loyalists: Various pro-Ba'athist groups operate in eastern Syria, including the "Popular Resistance of the Eastern Region" (founded in February 2018 in Raqqa), the "Popular Resistance in Hasakah" (founded in April 2018), and the "Popular Resistance in Manbij" (founded in June 2018). These groups are reportedly supported by Iran, and elements of the Syrian Arab Armed Forces such as the Baqir Brigade. The SDF and AANES government have accused Iran of organizing assassinations in SDF-held areas, attempting to turn locals against the SDF and American-led Coalition presence. After the fall of the Assad regime, the SDF took action against the remaining Ba'athist insurgents.

== Timeline ==
=== 2017 ===
- November – Harakat al-Qiyam attempted to assassinate SDF commander Muhammad Abu Adel with an IED in Manbij, leaving him injured.

=== 2018 ===
- 5 April – The Popular Resistance claimed to have carried out a mortar or rocket attack on a U.S. base at Ayn Issa.
- 6 April – The Baqir Brigade vowed to aid the pro-government insurgency in territories held by U.S.-allied forces.
- 17 May – U.S. special forces arrested ISIL commanders following an air drop near the Iraqi border in al-Hasakah Governorate.
- 17 August - A Base housing US and French Special Forces near Deir ez-Zor was attacked by ISIL members. The attack was repelled and at least seven jihadist were killed
- 2 September – 5 SDF militiamen were killed and wounded by an IED planted in Raqqa.
- 31 October – The Turkish military and SDF began clashes with stated future goals of a Turkish-led operation in Manbij. The fighting lasted one week, with the United States responding by establishing observation posts in Manbij to prevent further violence.
- 2 November – ISIL gunmen assassinated the prominent tribal leader Sheikh Basheer Faisal al-Huwaidi in broad daylight in the city of Raqqa.
- 4 November – A car bomb exploded in the city of Raqqa, killing at least one person and injuring ten more people, which included members of the SDF. ISIL claimed responsibility for the attack through its Amaq News Agency.
- 4 December – YPG claimed to have arrested four members of Harakat al-Qiyam, allegedly collaborating with Turkish intelligence.

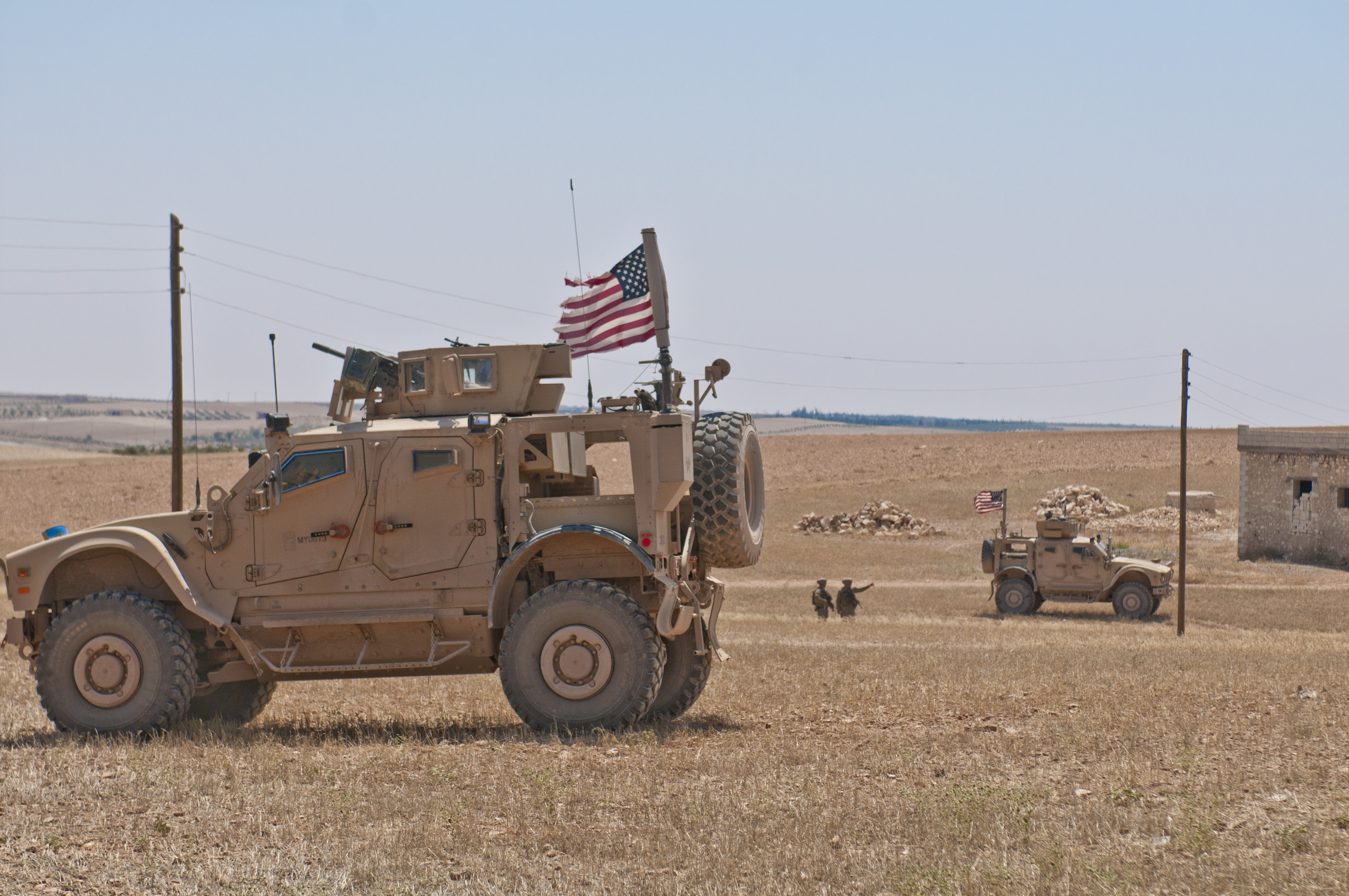
U.S. M-ATVs patrolling the Manbij countryside, 14 July 2018

=== 2019 ===
==== January–March ====
- January – the founder of the Arab Ahwaz Brigade, an Arab Free Syrian Army group from Deir ez-Zor, was killed by an IED planted by ISIL in Deir ez-Zor. He reportedly joined the Syrian Democratic Forces and became involved with its Deir ez-Zor Military Council serving as a leader in the council.
- 16 January – the Manbij bombing killed 15 Manbij Military Council (MMC) fighters and four US soldiers. ISIL claimed the attack through its news agency Amaq.
- 21 January – an ISIL suicide SVBIED targeted a US convoy accompanied by SDF troops on the Shadadi-Hasakah road in the Jazira Region, killing five SDF personnel. Witnesses say the SVBIED rammed into an SDF vehicle by a checkpoint held by Kurdish forces a dozen kilometers outside Shadadi as the US convoy drove past.
- 7 February – the SDF media center announced the capture of 63 ISIL operatives in Raqqa, part of a sleeper cell. They were all arrested within a 24-hour period, ending the day-long curfew that had been imposed on the city the day before.
- 9 February – ISIL militants attacked SDF fighters near the al-Omar oilfield, triggering airstrikes by the U.S.-led Coalition. SOHR said 12 Islamic State fighters attacked the SDF and clashed with them for several hours until most of the attackers were killed. Ten attackers were reportedly killed, while two managed to flee. Other activist collectives, including the Step news agency, reported the attack, saying some of the attackers used motorcycles rigged with explosives.
- 21 February – two successive SVBIEDs detonated in the market area of Shahil, Syria - 10 kilometers from the SDF's al-Omar oilfield HQ - killing 14 people. SOHR reported a car bomb that was detonated remotely as a convoy of workers and technicians that worked at the oilfield was passing by. SOHR said 20 were killed and others wounded. SVBIED attacks were also reported in Afrin and the village of Ghandura near Jarablus.
- 9 March – eight people were wounded when a suicide bomber blew up a car in Manbij, near a market. The Islamic State claimed responsibility for the attack.
- 14 March – an IED in Raqqa targeted a US military convoy. Al-Masdar reported that the pro-Syrian government Popular Resistance of Raqqa group claimed responsibility and that they had killed SDF fighters and injured U.S. soldiers, but that these claims could not be independently verified and that neither the US nor SDF confirmed the reports.
- 26 March – ISIL gunmen opened fire on a checkpoint in Manbij, killing seven MMC fighters.

==== April–June ====
- 3 April – An ISIL cell clashed with the SDF and the Asayish in Raqqa, with 4 ISIL fighters blowing themselves with explosive belts, according to SOHR.
- 5 April – About 200 ISIL detainees revolted and attempted to escape from Dêrik prison in al-Malikiyah. The breakout was foiled, and some of the prisoners were subsequently distributed to other detention centers.
- 10 April – ISIL cells attacked SDF fighters at a checkpoint in rural Deir Ez Zor on the outskirts of the town of al-Shuhayl, the cell reportedly used machine guns and RPGs during the attack, as part of a global campaign launched by ISIL, which the group has called "The campaign in revenge for the blessed Province of the Levant" after losing territorial control in Syria after the Battle of Baghuz Fawqani, which has prompted the group to carry out a series of attacks around the world where the group has a presence, as well as encouraging supporters to carry out lone wolf attacks in their countries, other attacks related to the group's call for vengeance have occurred in Libya and Iraq.
- 12 April – ISIL claimed responsibility for an attack in Manbij against members of the SDF.
- 23 April – Major protests began in the cities of Al-Busayrah and Shuhail in the eastern part of the Deir ez-Zor Governorate in opposition to SDF and Kurdish rule.
- 7 May – A senior commander in the SDFs' Deir ez-Zor military council claimed that Iran, Turkey, and the Syrian government are collaborating to destabilize SDF controlled areas with fighters from Operation Euphrates Shield and al-Nusra remnant cells in eastern Syria. The commander also claimed there is ideological support for ISIL and al-Nusra among the local populations, particularly in the towns of Jadidat Agidat, Shehail, and Basira, which is a hub for Deir ez-Zor's tribes and has also been the site for recent protests against SDF administration. The commander also claimed that the SDF had foiled 180 attempted attacks against SDF, and claimed that Turkey and the Syrian Government provide support for these attacks.
- 11 May – Unidentified gunmen attacked a YPG headquarters in the western part of the town of Shuhail, where ongoing protests against the SDF were occurring.
- 30 May – U.S. special forces arrested 15 ISIL members following an air drop in Qana village in al-Hasakah Governorate.

==== July–September ====
- 1 July – U.S. special forces arrested two ISIL commanders following an air drop in Attala village in al-Hasakah Governorate.
- 7 July – SDF forces arrested at least 30 people and confiscated their belongings in Al-Izba village in Deir ez-Zor Governorate. On the same day, U.S. special forces arrested an ISIL commander after encircling his house in Al-Harijiyeh village in Deir Ezzor Governorate.
- 12 July – U.S. special forces killed an ISIL commander in the area between al-Suwar and Abu al-Nitel village.
- 14 July – According to Al-Masdar, the SDF and U.S. special forces killed ISIL's oil minister Thabit Sobhi Fahd Al-Ahmad during a raid somewhere in Deir ez-Zor Governorate.
- 25 July – SDF forces arrested 8 ISIS members within the east Euphrates area.
- 1 September – The SDF's Anti-Terror Units captured Mohammed Remedan Eyd al-Talah, ISIL's chief financial officer, during a raid in ash-Shahil, Deir ez-Zor Governorate.

==== October–December ====
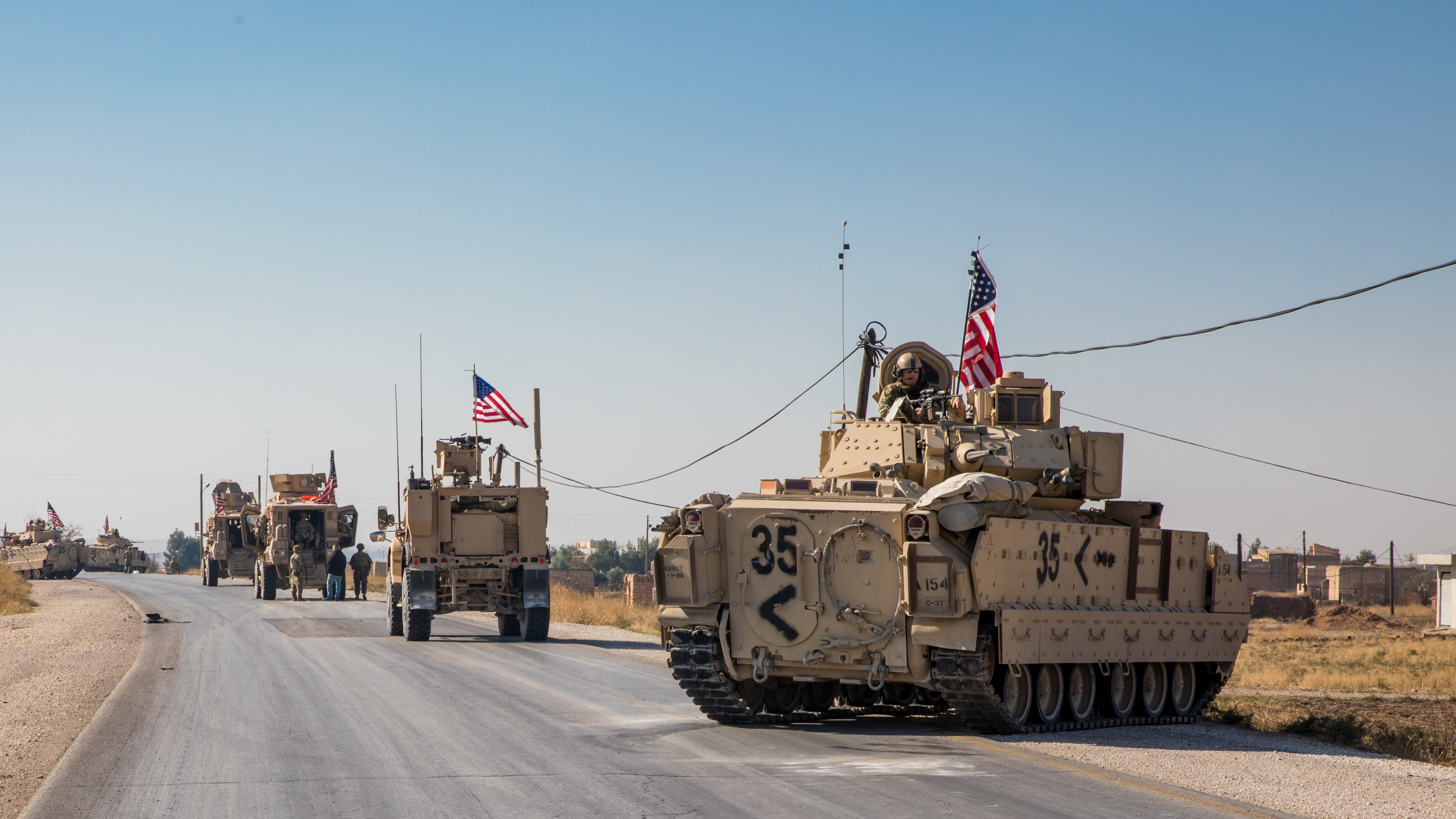
A U.S. patrol accompanied by M2A2 Bradley vehicles in eastern Syria, 10 November 2019

- October – The U.S. withdrew from many of its bases in northern Syria in early October, substantially reducing its presence there and disrupting anti-ISIL operations. Nevertheless, the U.S., with Kurdish, Turkish and Iraqi assistance, conducted a successful high-stakes special operations raid in Barisha, Idlib targeting ISIL Caliph Abu Bakr al-Baghdadi; the raid resulted in Baghdadi's death and ISIL selecting a new leader/Caliph Abu Ibrahim al-Hashimi al-Qurashi. By the end of October, the U.S. had adopted a subordinate mission to protect SDF-controlled oil and gas infrastructure, including oil fields, from the ISIL insurgency as the insurgent group had previously used profits from oil smuggling to fund its activities. The U.S. deployed mechanized infantry units for the first time in its intervention to "reinforce" its presence in eastern Syria and to assist its continuing anti-ISIL insurgency mission.
- 22 November – Coalition forces accompanied by allies attacked ISIL enclaves near the Iraqi border, which reportedly resulted in multiple ISIL fighters being killed and wounded. While up to 600 ISIL fighters are thought to be defending a small pocket stronghold in Syria's eastern province of Deir ez-Zor.
- 26 November – A car bomb went off in an area under the control of Turkish and allied rebel forces west of Ras al-Ayn, killing at least 17 people and injuring 20 others. The attack happened at a local village market. The Turkish government blamed YPG and PKK for the attack.
- Overall - During the year ISIS attacks left, 280 SDF fighters, 131 civilians and four CJTF-OIR soldiers killed.

=== 2020 ===
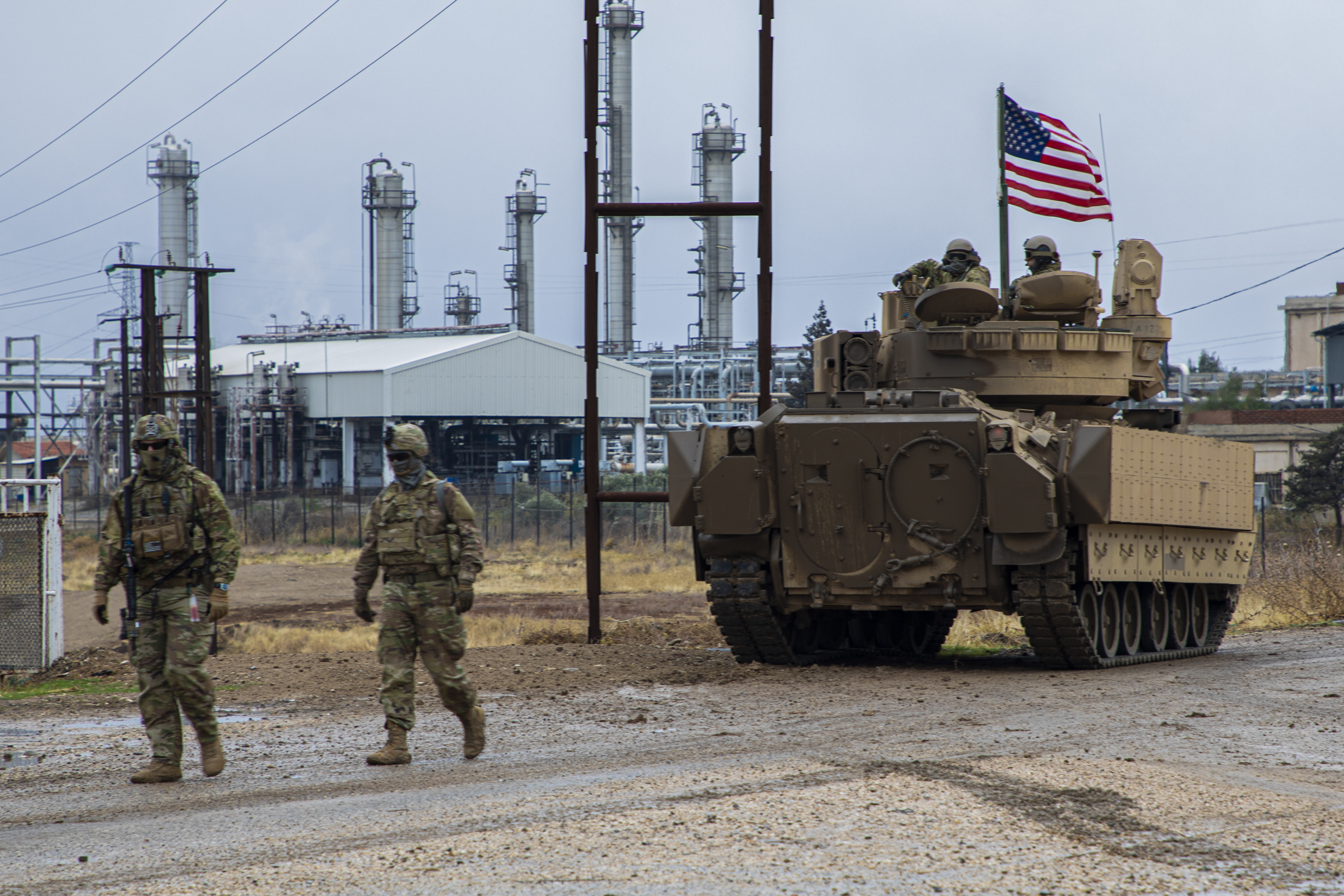
U.S. soldiers guard a refinery in northeastern Syria, 16 December 2020

==== January–March ====
- 1 January – 16 ISIS fighters were captured during a raid in Deir ez-Zor Governorate by the Coalition forces.
- 14 January – SDF managed to kill two ISIL members, including Abu Alward Al-Iraqi, who was responsible for oil trading, in the Deir ez-Zor Governorate.
- 17 January – During an explosion targeting an SDF vehicle in Abu Hardub village in the eastern countryside of Deir Ezzor, one SDF member was killed and one more injured.
- 27 January – Coalition Bradley IFVs were pulled out of Syria after less than two month of deployment due to unspecified reasons.
- 11 February – U.S. special forces arrested 3 suspected ISIL members following an air drop in ash-Shahil, Deir ez-Zor Governorate.

==== April–June ====
- 17 May – Two regional ISIS leaders, Ahmad 'Isa Ismail al-Zawi and Ahmad 'Abd Muhammad Hasan al-Jughayfi, were killed by coalition forces in Deir Ezzor Governorate.
- 22 May – U.S. special forces killed an ISIL commander and arrested another following an air drop in ash-Shahil, Deir ez-Zor Governorate.
- 26 May – The Iraqi counter-terrorism agency announced that a U.S. airstrike managed to kill Mu'taz Numan 'Abd Nayif Najm al-Jaburi, a senior leader and bomb-maker in ISIS, in Deir Ezzor Governorate. The U.S. Rewards for Justice Program used to offer up to $5 million reward to information that would bring him to justice.
- 29 June – U.S. special forces arrested suspected ISIL members following an air drop in ash-Shahil, Deir ez-Zor Governorate.

==== July–December ====
ISIL militants reportedly continued to routinely extort doctors, shop owners, heads of factories, landowners, and many others to pay them zakat.

- October 2020 – SDF announced plans to free thousands of Syrians held at the al-Hawl refugee camp.
- Overall - During the year 480 ISIS attacks left, 122 SDF fighters and 86 civilians killed.

=== 2021 ===
- 11 January – Three people including a former Asayish member were assassinated by unidentified gunmen on a motorcycle near Al-Busayrah, Deir ez-Zor Governorate.
- 10 May – An SDF member was assassinated in al-Busaiteen, near the town of al-Suwar, meanwhile four SDF members were killed when ISIS militants opened fire on their bus in Al-Kabar, western countryside of Deir ez-Zor.
- 13 August – U.S. coalition conducted a special operation to arrest an ISIS militant in Mahamida near Abu Khashab, Deir ez-Zor.
- 13 December - The SDF stated that counter-terrorism forces had killed five members of an ISIL cell hiding in al-Busayrah during a joint raid with the coalition. Most of the five militants wore explosive belts, the SDF stated. SOHR said four members of a family were also killed, two of which were targeted by coalition helicopter gunfire while trying to flee on a motorbike.
- Overall - During the year 344 ISIS attacks left, 136 SDF fighters and 93 civilians killed.

=== 2022 ===
- 20 January – The Battle of Hasakah begins.
- 11 September – ISIS attack kills 6 SDF fighters in Deir Ez-Zor
- Overall - During the year 201 ISIS attacks left, 93 SDF fighters and 54 civilians killed (excluding Battle of Hasakah 2022).

=== 2023 ===
- 3 April – An American-led coalition strike kills senior ISIS member Khalid Aydd Ahmad al-Jabouri.
- August 10 – 33 Syrian soldiers were killed and 10 were injured in an ambush carried out by Islamic State militants west of the city of Mayadeen.
- August 28 – Fighting erupts between the SDF and tribal fighters after several members of the latter were arrested on charges of criminal activity, including drug trafficking. Those arrested included Abu Khawla, Deir ez-Zor Military Council commander. Over the next two days, at least 30 people are killed in clashes at Hrejieh and Breeha.
- Overall - During the year, 165 ISIS attacks left 89 SDF fighters, 26 civilians, and four ISIS fighters killed.

=== 2024 ===
- 23 September - two SDF fighters were killed in an ISIS attack in Deir ez-Zor Province.
- 21 November - two SDF fighters were killed and four civilians injured in a landmine explosion, planted by ISIS in Kobani.
- 21 November - two SDF fighters were killed and 10 others injured in an IED attack by ISIS in Deir ez-Zor Province.
- 3 December – the SDF, supported by the US-led CJTF–OIR coalition, launched an offensive on pro-government forces in the eastern Deir ez-Zor region.
- 9 December – anti-SDF protests erupted in Deir ez-Zor calling for the Syrian transitional government to take control over the city.
- 11 December – Deir ez-Zor came under the control of Tahrir al-Sham. Some SDF Military Council leaders defected to the Fateh Mubin operations room.
- 27 December - two SDF fighters were killed and three others injured in simultaneous attack by ISIS in Al-Hasakah and Deir ez-Zor Provinces.
- Overall - During the year, 264 ISIS attacks left, 77 SDF fighters, 30 civilians and 13 ISIS fighters killed.

=== 2025 ===
- 7 January - Four SDF members were killed in an ISIS ambush on checkpoint in the Deir ez-Zor Province.
- 16 January - a SDF member was executed by ISIS cells and body was dumped in the western part of Abu Khashab town in the western countryside of Deir Ezzor.
- 19 January - a SDF member was killed and others were wounded in a local gunmen ambush near Euphrates River in Deir ez-Zor Countryside.
- 25 January - a SDF member was killed and another wounded by an ISIS attack in Al-Hasakah.
- 29 January - a SDF member was killed in an ISIS attack in Al-Hasakah Province.
- 1 February - Syrian media reported that the SDF launched raids in Kishkiya, Abu Hamam, and Gharanij, and arrested 10 people. Kurdish media reported that the SDF arrested 20 people “dealing with the former regime” in Gharanij, but Anti-SDF media claimed that the SDF also targeted members of local tribes.
- 6 February - a SDF member was killed another injured in an ISIS attack in Deir ez-Zor.
- 19 February - a SDF member was killed by accidental gunshot in a family infighting, incident take place in Al-Hasakah.
- 26 February - a civilian working for SDF was killed in Western Deir ez-Zor Countryside.
- 10 March - a SDF member was killed in an ISIS attack in eastern Deir Ezzor.
- 12 March - an Asayîş member was killed and two others were injured in an ambush by ISIS cells in the Al-Hazima area in Al-Raqqa.
- 14 March - The SDF and the US-led CJTF–OIR conducted joint live-fire exercises with heavy weapons and drones near the Conoco Gas Fields.
- 29 March - an ISIS member was killed in clashes with SDF in Deir Ezzor.
- 5 April - The Asayîş and YPJ started an Anti-Terror-Operation in the Roj Camp near Dêrik.
- 6 April - according to Kurdish sources, six ISIS collaborators were arrested inside Roj camp near Dêrik.
- 6 April - a civilian collaborator of SDF was killed by ISIS members in Deir Ezzor.
- 13 April - a SDF member was killed and three others wounded in an ISIS attack in Eastern Deir Ezzor Countryside.
- 13 April - On the same day, a SDF member was killed in an ISIS attack in eastern Deir Ezzor Countryside.
- 17 April - a SDF member was killed by ISIS cells in Al-Hasakah.
- 21 April - a civilian was killed by SDF members in Al-Hasakah.
- 28 April - Five Self-Defense Forces members were killed and another was injured in a surprise ISIS attack on their positions in Jarzat Al-Milaj in Deir Ezzor countryside.
- 6 May - Two SDF members were killed by an ISIS attack in eastern Deir Ezzor.
- 19 May - a SDF member was killed and two others wounded in an ISIS attack on a military post in Deir Ezzor.
- 25 May - a SDF member was killed and two others wounded in an ISIS attack in Al-Raqqah.
- 31 May - a SDF member was killed and another wounded in an ISIS attack in eastern Deir Ezzor.
- 1 June - Three SDF members were killed in an IED attack by ISIS cells near Tell Abyad countryside.
- 17 June - a SDF member was killed by ISIS attack in Deir Ezzor.
- 26-27 June - a child was murdered by a drunk SDF member in Deir Ezzor, incident resulted in mass Anti-SDF protests.
- 2 July - a SDF member was killed in a landmine explosion in Al-Raqqah.
- 3 July - Two people including a former SDF member were killed by ISIS in Eastern Deir Ezzor.
- 14 July - Five Kurdish Asayish fighters were killed after ISIS militants attacked their checkpoint on Al-Dashisha road in southern Al-Hasakah countryside.
- 25 July - a SDF member was killed and two others injured in an ISIS attack in Eastern Deir Ezzor.
- 28 July - a collaborator of SDF was killed and his wife injured by ISIS attack in Deir Ezzor.
- 31 July - a SDF member and a SDF civilian guard were killed while another civilian injured in an ISIS attack in Deir Ezzor.
- 1 August - Five SDF members were killed and another injured in an ISIS attack in Eastern Deir Ezzor.
- 6 August - Two SDF members were killed and another injured by an ISIS attack in Eastern Deir Ezzor.
- 8 August - a SDF member was killed by an ISIS attack in Eastern Deir Ezzor.
- 14 August - a SDF member was killed by ISIS attack in Southern Al-Hasakah.
- 14 August - On the same day, clashes erupted between Syrian Democratic Forces and Arab Tribal and Clan Forces insurgents, during clashes an Arab militant was killed three others injured and six SDF members were captured.
- 20 August - a SDF member was killed by an ISIS attack in Deir Ezzor.
- 21 August - Two Kurdish Asayish members and a gunman were killed during a pursuit in Al-Raqqa.
- 24 August - a former SDF commander was killed by an ISIS attack in Eastern Deir Ezzor.
- 25 August - a SDF member was killed by an ISIS attack in Deir Ezzor countryside.
- 25 August - On the same day, a Kurdish Asayish member was killed by an ISIS attack in Al-Hasakah.
- 26 August - a SDF member was killed by an ISIS attack in Deir Ezzor countryside.
- 1 September - Two ISIS militants were killed in a failed attack on SDF military post in Al-Raqqa.
- 5 September - a SDF member was killed by an ISIS attack in Deir Ezzor.
- 8 September - Three Kurdish Asayish members were killed and another one injured by attack of their fellow Asayish member, incident occurred in al-Hawl Camp.
- 11 September - a civilian was killed by SDF members in Eastern Deir Ezzor.
- 12 September - a Kurdish Asayish member was killed and two others injured by an ISIS attack in Eastern Deir Ezzor.
- 19 September - a SDF member was killed and two others injured by an ISIS attack in Western Deir Ezzor countryside.
- 19 September - On the same day, a SDF member was succumbed to the wounds by yesterdays ISIS attack in the Eastern Deir Ezzor countryside.
- 22 September - a SDF member was killed by the person over a dispute, incident occurred in Aleppo countryside.
- 25 September - Five SDF members were killed and another one injured by an ISIS rocket attack in Deir Ezzor.
- 26 September - Four SDF members and an ISIS militant were killed by clashes in Eastern Deir Ezzor.
- 11 November - ISIS cell launches an RPG at a currency exchange store.
- 13 December - two US soldiers and an American translator were killed and three Syrian soldiers were injured by an attack at Palmyra City and an assailant was killed.

=== 2026 ===
- 17 January - SDF claims to have foiled an attempt by a "sabotage cell" in Al-Mansoura.
- 21 February - The Islamic State claimed responsibility for two attacks on security personnel in Mayadin and Raqqa, in which a soldier and a civilian were killed.
- 23 February - The Syrian interior ministry reported that four security personnel and an assailant were killed in an attack claimed to involve the Islamic State at a checkpoint in Raqqa.
- 20 August - SDF commander-in-chief Mazloum Abdi declared that the SDF's integration into the Syrian government had been completed.

== See also ==
- Islamic State insurgency in Iraq (2017–present), a similar insurgency in neighboring Iraq
- Second Northern Syria Buffer Zone
- Syrian Desert campaign (December 2017 – December 2024)
- SDF insurgency in Northern Aleppo
- Insurgency in Idlib
