= Oil campaign of World War II =

Allied aerial bombing campaign (1940–45)

Oil campaign
- Part of the strategic bombing during World War II
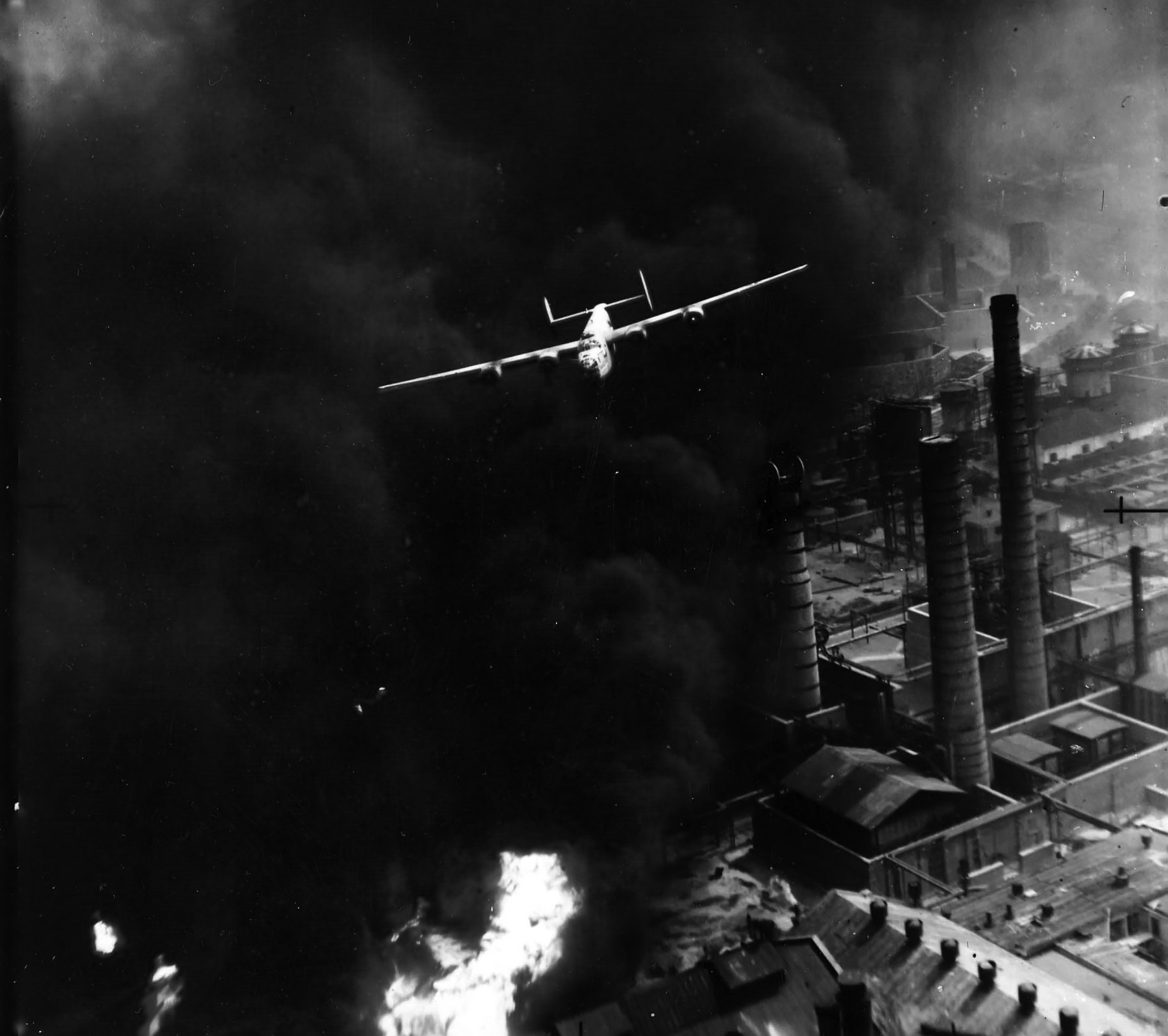
- The Sandman, a B-24 Liberator, emerges from smoke over the Astra Română refinery, Ploiești, during Operation Tidal Wave (1 August 1943)
Date	15 May 1940 – 26 April 1945
Location	European theatre of World War II
Result	Allied victory

Belligerents
United States; United Kingdom	Germany; Romania (until 1944) Hungary

Commanders and leaders
(United Kingdom) Richard Peirse; (1940 – 1941 (Dec)); (United States) Carl Spaatz; (1942 (May) – 1945); (United Kingdom) Arthur Harris; (1942 (Feb) – 1945)	Carl Krauch; Ion Antonescu; Paul Pleiger

Strength
(United States) 8th Air Force (United States) 15th Air Force (United Kingdom) RAF Bomber Command	See Defence of the Reich

Casualties and losses
US: 5,400 aircraft lost (Note: 4,300 to fighters)	

The Allied oil campaign of World War II was an aerial bombing campaign conducted by the RAF and the USAAF against facilities supplying Nazi Germany with petroleum, oil, and lubrication (POL) products. It formed part of the immense Allied strategic bombing effort during the war. The targets in Germany and in Axis-controlled Europe included refineries, synthetic-fuel factories, storage depots and other POL-infrastructure.

Before the war, Britain had identified Germany's reliance on oil and oil products for its war machine, and the strategic bombing started with RAF attacks on Germany in 1940. After the US entered the war (December 1941), it carried out daytime "precision bombing" attacks – such as Operation Tidal Wave against refineries in Romania in 1943. The last major strategic raid of the European theater of the war targeted a refinery in Norway in April 1945.

During the war the effort expended against POL targets varied, with relative priority moving between the other objectives within the Allied Combined Bomber Offensive such as to defeating the German V-weapon attacks, the destruction of the German air force, or to attacking transport links in preparation for the invasion of western Europe in 1944.

== Campaign strategy ==
The British had identified the importance of Germany's fuel supplies before the war in their "Western Air Plan 5(c)". The focus of British bombing during 1940 changed repeatedly in response to directives from the Air Ministry. At the start of June, oil targets were made a priority of night bombing with attacks on other war industry to be made on dark nights (when the oil targets could not be located) but with the proviso that "indiscriminate action" should be avoided. On 20 June oil targets were made third priority below the German aircraft industry and lines of communication between Germany and the armies at the front. Following a brief period when German shipping was given priority, oil targets were made secondary priority in mid July under a policy of concentrated attack with five oil refineries listed for attention. Sir Charles Portal was sceptical of the likelihood of success, saying that only a few targets could be located by average crews under moonlit conditions.

The RAF viewed Axis oil as a "vital centre", and in February 1941, the British Air Staff expected that RAF Bomber Command would, by destruction of half of a list of 17 targets, reduce Axis oil production capacity by 80%.

== Ploiești oilfield ==
Although the Butt Report of August 1941 identified the poor accuracy and performance of RAF bombing at the time, Air Chief Marshal Charles Portal maintained at the 1943 Casablanca Conference the great importance of oil targets in Axis territory. The first US bombing of a European target was of the Ploiești refineries in Romania on 12 June 1942, and the oil campaign continued at a lower priority until 1944. Priority fell with the need for attacks on German V-weapon targets ("Operation Crossbow") in France and then with the attacks on lines of communication in preparation for the June 1944 invasion of France (described as the "Transportation Plan").

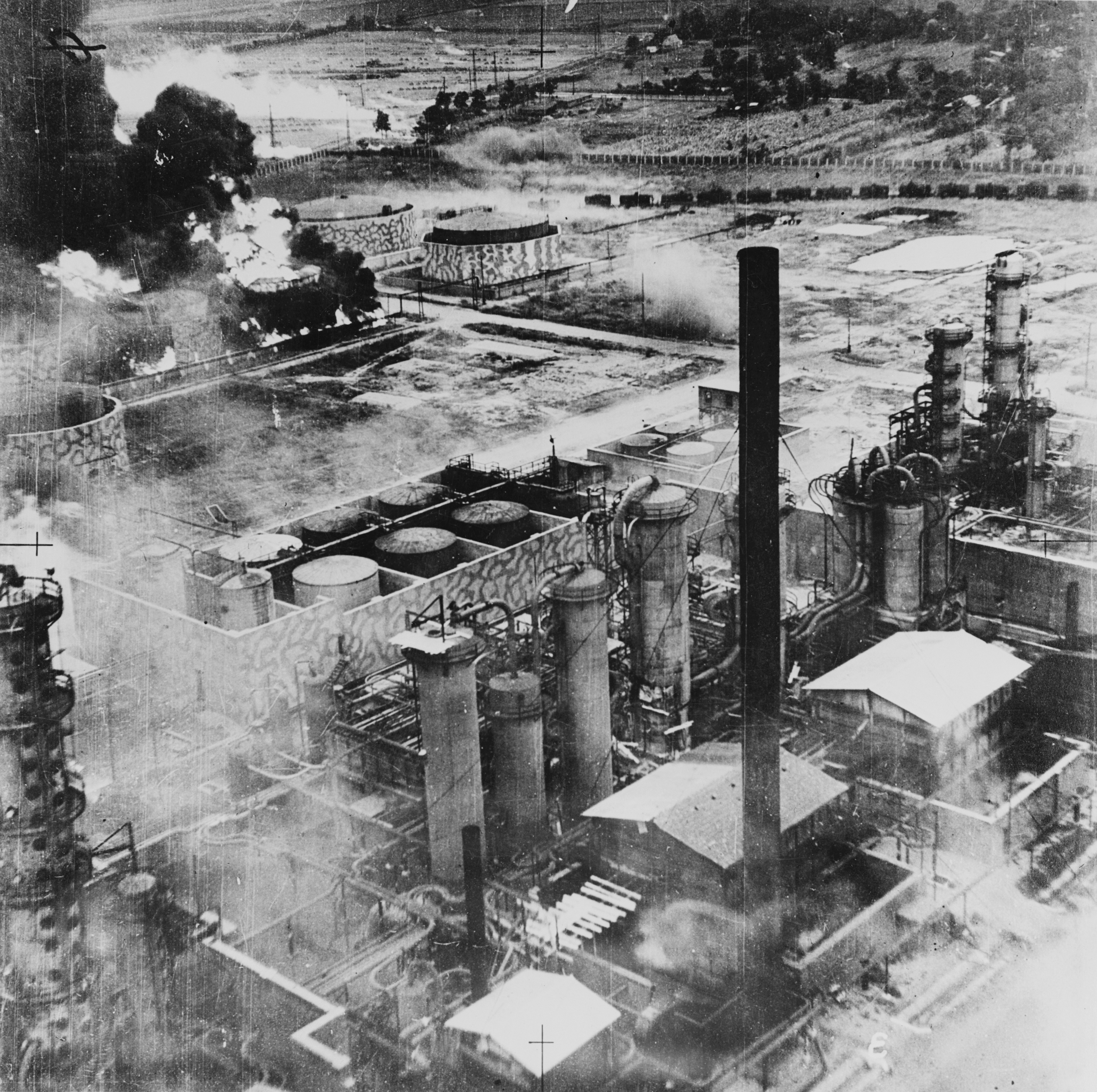
Columbia Aquila refinery at Ploiești in Romania burning after the raid of B-24 Liberator bombers in Operation Tidal Wave in August 1943

In March 1944 the "Plan for Completion of Combined Bomber Offensive" was put forward which found favour with the British Ministry of Economic Warfare. The plan proposed attacking "fourteen synthetic plants [of Brabag ] and thirteen refineries" of Nazi Germany. The plan estimated Axis oil-production could be reduced by 50% by bombing—33% below the amount Nazi Germany needed—but also included 4 additional priorities: first oil, then fighter and ball-bearing production, rubber production, and bomber output. The damage caused by the 12 and 28 May trial bombings of oil targets, as well as the confirmation of the oil facilities' importance and vulnerability from Ultra intercepts and other intelligence-reports, would result in the oil targets becoming the highest priority on 3 September 1944.

In June 1944, in response to an Air Ministry query on resources, Bomber Command staff estimated it would take 32,000 tons of bombs to destroy 10 oil targets in the Ruhr. Air Chief Marshal Arthur Harris agreed to divert spare effort to oil targets. They were deemed to be of such importance that one raid was staged that consisted only of bomb-carrying fighters, to rest the bomber crews and to surprise the defenders.

In August 1944 Romania switched from supporting the Axis to joining the Allies, and Ploiești's production ceased to flow to the Axis military.

In late summer 1944, the Allies began using reconnaissance photo information to time bombing with the resumption of production at a facility. Even with the weather limitations: "This was the big breakthrough ... a plant would be wounded ... by successive attacks on its electrical grid—its nervous system—and on its gas and water mains." (author Donald Miller). However, due to bad fall and winter weather, a "far greater tonnage" was expended on Transportation Plan targets than on oil targets. The benzol (oil) plant at Linz in Austria was bombed on 16 October 1944.

In January 1945, the priority of oil targets was lowered.

To prevent oil supplies from Romania reaching Germany, the RAF had extended its aerial mining activities to the Danube.

== Post-war ==
Despite the RAF's and Harris's claims regarding the great importance of oil targets, Harris had opposed assigning the highest priority to oil targets but acknowledged post-war that the campaign was "a complete success" with the qualifier: "I still do not think that it was reasonable, at that time, to expect that the [oil] campaign would succeed; what the Allied strategists did was to bet on an outsider, and it happened to win the race."

Joint Chiefs of Staff Directive 1067 prohibited German post-war production of oil through July 1947, and the United States Army made post-war provisions to rehabilitate and use petroleum installations where needed, as well as to dispose of unneeded captured equipment. After inspections of various plants by the "European technology mission" (Plan for Examination of Oil Industry of Axis Europe) and a report in March 1946, the United States Bureau of Mines employed seven Operation Paperclip synthetic fuel scientists in a Fischer–Tropsch chemical plant in Louisiana, Missouri. In October 1975, Texas A&M University began the German Document Retrieval Project and completed a report on 28 April 1977. The report identified final investigations of the German plants and interrogations of German scientists by the British Intelligence Objectives Sub-Committee, the US Field Information Agency (Technical), and the Combined Intelligence Objectives Sub-Committee.

== Opinions on outcome ==
Despite its successes, by the spring of 1944 the Combined Bomber Offensive had failed to dislocate the German economy or inflict severe disruptions in the production of vital items; the oil campaign missions were the first targeted attacks to accomplish these goals. The US strategic bombing survey (USSBS) identified "catastrophic" damage. German industry in and of itself was not significantly affected by attacks on oil targets, as coal was its primary source of energy, but in its analysis of strategic bombing as a whole the USSBS identified the consequences of the breakdown of transportation resulting from attacks against transportation targets as "probably greater than any other single factor" in the final collapse of the German economy.

Several prominent German military officers, however, described the oil campaign as critical to the defeat of Nazi Germany. Adolf Galland, (Note: Inspector of Fighters of the Luftwaffe until relieved of command in January 1945) wrote in his book "the most important of the combined factors which brought about the collapse of Germany", and the Luftwaffe's wartime leader, Hermann Göring, described it as "the utmost in deadliness". Albert Speer, writing in his memoir, said that "It meant the end of German armaments production." It has been stated to have been "effective immediately, and decisive within less than a year". Luftwaffe Field Marshal Erhard Milch, referring to the consequences of the oil campaign, claimed that "The British left us with deep and bleeding wounds, but the Americans stabbed us in the heart."

== Statistics ==
The following statistics are from the British Bombing Survey Unit. Figures are for the oil campaign in the last year of the war.

Number of attacks by the RAF and USAAF against oil targets:

Month	USAAF Eighth Air Force	USAAF Fifteenth Air Force	RAF Bomber Command
May 1944	11	10	0
June 1944	20	32	10
July 1944	9	36	20
August 1944	33	23	20
September 1944	23	8	14
October 1944	18	10	10
November 1944	32	19	22
December 1944	7	33	15
January 1945	17	5	23
February 1945	20	20	24
March 1945	36	24	33
April 1945	7	1	9
Total	233	221	200

Short tons dropped on oil targets:

Month	USAAF Eighth Air Force	USAAF Fifteenth Air Force	RAF Bomber Command
May 1944	2,883	1,540	0
June 1944	3,689	5,653	4,562
July 1944	5,379	9,313	3,829
August 1944	7,116	3,997	1,856
September 1944	7,495	1,829	4,488
October 1944	4,462	2,515	4,088
November 1944	15,884	4,168	16,029
December 1944	2,937	6,226	5,772
January 1945	3,537	2,023	10,114
February 1945	1,616	4,362	15,749
March 1945	9,550	6,628	21,211
April 1945	1,949	124	5,993
Total	66,497	48,378	93,691

The efficiency of the bombing was lacking. Working from German records for certain sites, the USSBS determined that on average 87% of Allied bombs fell outside the factory perimeter and that only a few percent struck plant or equipment inside the boundary. The USAAF could put 26% of their bombing within the factories in good bombing conditions, 12% when using a mix of visual and instruments but only 5% when it had to use instrument-only bombing techniques; and 80% of their tonnage was delivered under partly or fully instrument conditions. The RAF bombing by night with Pathfinder techniques averaged 16% inside the factory.

Bomber Command's efforts against oil were more efficient in some regards – although delivering a smaller total tonnage than the USAAF 8th and 15th Air Forces together, it delivered more tonnage in fewer attacks than the 8th AF which was also operating from bases in eastern England. The USSBS believed that Bomber Command's heavy bombs – 4,000-pound (1,800 kg) Blockbuster bombs – were more effective than an equivalent weight of smaller bombs. Both RAF and USAAF dropped a large number of bombs on oil targets that failed to explode: 19% and 12% respectively.

== See also ==
- Oil campaign chronology of World War II
- Oil campaign targets of World War II
- Anglo-Soviet invasion of Iran (August–September 1941) to secure access to Persian oil
- Dutch East Indies campaign (1941–1942) Japan operation to secure oil and rubber resources
- Case Blue and Operation Edelweiss - by Germany in the summer of 1942
- Battle of Romania in August 1944, which deprived the Axis of Romanian oil fields
- Chaco War - A major conflict fought on the assumption that the Chaco region could be a rich source of oil
- Operation Tidal Wave II - USAF air campaign aimed at disrupt Islamic State oil production and transport capabilities
