= Battle of Hasakah =

Battle of Hasakah may refer to:

- Battle of Hasakah (2015)
- Battle of Hasakah (2016)
- Battle of Hasakah (2022)
