= Anti-Terror Units =

- Kurdish: Yekîneyên Antî Teror
- Active: 2014–2026
- Country: Autonomous Administration of North and East Syria
- Branch: People's Protection Units (YPG); Women's Protection Units (YPJ)
- Type: Special forces
- Role: Counter-insurgency; Counter-terrorism; Direct action High-value targets Manhunting; Intelligence operations Mobility operations Unconventional warfare
- Engagements: Kurdistan Workers' Party insurgency; Syrian Civil War; Operation Euphrates Shield; Raqqa campaign (2016–2017); Battle of Tabqa (2017); Battle of Raqqa (2017); Deir ez-Zor offensive (September 2017–March 2018); Operation Olive Branch; Eastern Syria insurgency (2017–present); 2024 Manbij offensive

Commanders
- Notable commanders: Ali Boutan (nom de guerre: Haji Kurkhan) †; Shervan Kobani †

The Anti-Terror Units (Kurdish: Yekîneyên Antî Teror, abbreviated YAT, Arabic: وحدات مكافحة الإرهاب) were the special forces of the Syrian Democratic Forces, consisting of the best trained and equipped members of the People's Protection Units (YPG) and Women's Protection Units (YPJ). They were led by the Syrian Kurdish commander Ali Boutan until his death in 2016, then by Shervan Kobani until his death in 2023. YAT is trained by United States special operations forces and the CIA.

== History ==
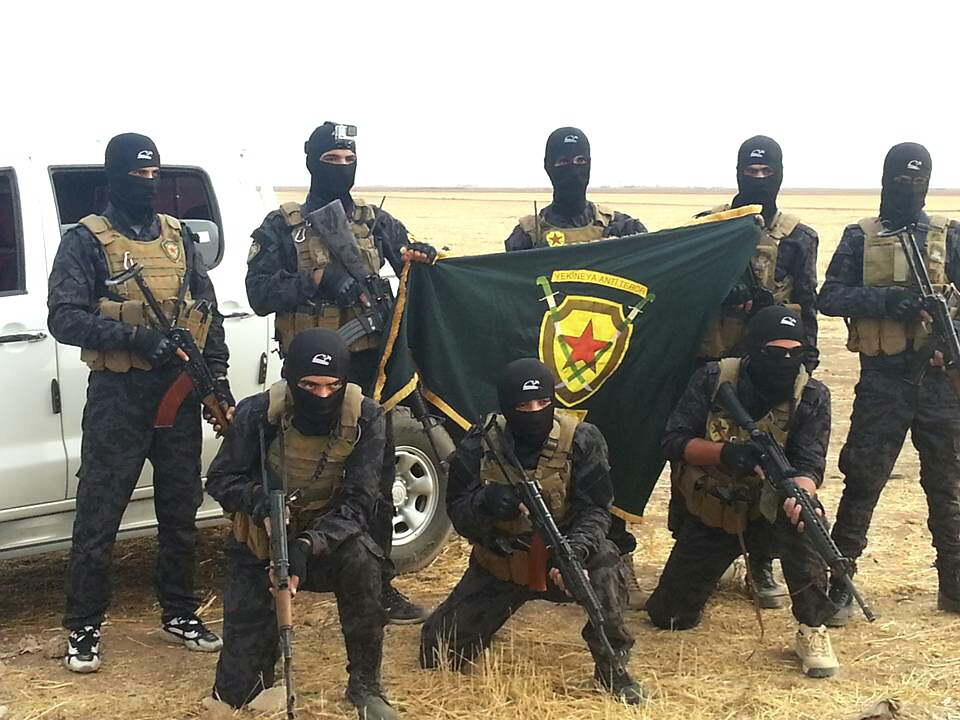
YAT fighters with the unit's flag in late 2015.

Formed as the YPG's special forces in late 2014, the unit was organized to seek and destroy Islamic State of Iraq and the Levant (ISIL) sleeper cells in Rojava and to conduct operations behind enemy lines. At first, the unit "existed in name only", as it consisted of "fierce fighters but only just that". This changed under the leadership of Ali Boutan who reformed YAT and began to put its members through training courses that were intended to emulate those of US and British special forces, while providing them with the best equipment the YPG/YPJ could afford. As cooperation between the YPG and the United States increased, YAT was further trained by US special forces and the CIA in designated compounds in Rojava and Jordan, while some YAT commanders were sent to Fort Bragg and Fort Campbell for in-depth training.

Since its formation, YAT has carried out raids against ISIL targets, arrested ISIL sleeper cells, and stopped ISIL terrorist attacks. In September 2016, YAT captured two Sultan Murad Division fighters who had previously been filmed torturing YPG fighters in Jarabulus.

In November 2016, Boutan was the target of an improvised explosive device (IED) in Qamishli, which exploded as his car passed by. Even though an American SOF medic attempted to save his life, he died of his wounds shortly after. The attack was believed to have been carried out by the Turkish National Intelligence Organization. The Turkish pro-government Anadolu Agency claimed that Boutan had been responsible for sending Kurdistan Workers' Party (PKK) fighters into Turkey in order to conduct "terror operations".

In April 2017, YAT aided US special forces in capturing parts of the Tabqa Dam from ISIL. During the battle, YAT commandos were equipped with US-supplied combat helmets, AN/PVS-7 night vision devices, flashlights, and were armed with M4 carbines equipped with AN/PEQ-2 laser sights, holographic weapon sights, and STANAG magazines.

On 21 June 2017, YAT captured five ISIL sleeper agents who were preparing a terrorist attack in Manbij. In January 2018, the Anti-Terror Units killed the mastermind of the July 2016 Qamishli bombings, Hisen Ayid el-Bilebil Ebu el-Walid, during operations in Deir ez-Zor Governorate. In the same month, they also captured around twenty foreign members of ISIL as they attempted to flee from Syria to Turkey. One of those arrested was Thomas Barnouin, a French jihadist who is considered to be one of the planners of the 2012 Toulouse attack and the November 2015 Paris attacks.

YAT was involved in resisting Operation Olive Branch in early 2018, with some of its members reportedly killed by the Turkish Armed Forces.

On 1 September 2019, YAT captured Mohammed Remedan Eyd al-Talah, ISIL's chief financial officer, during a raid in ash-Shahil, Deir ez-Zor Governorate.

9 YAT members including its commander Shervan Kobani were killed when two helicopters carrying them crashed in Duhok Governorate, Kurdistan Region on 15 March 2023.

== Gallery ==
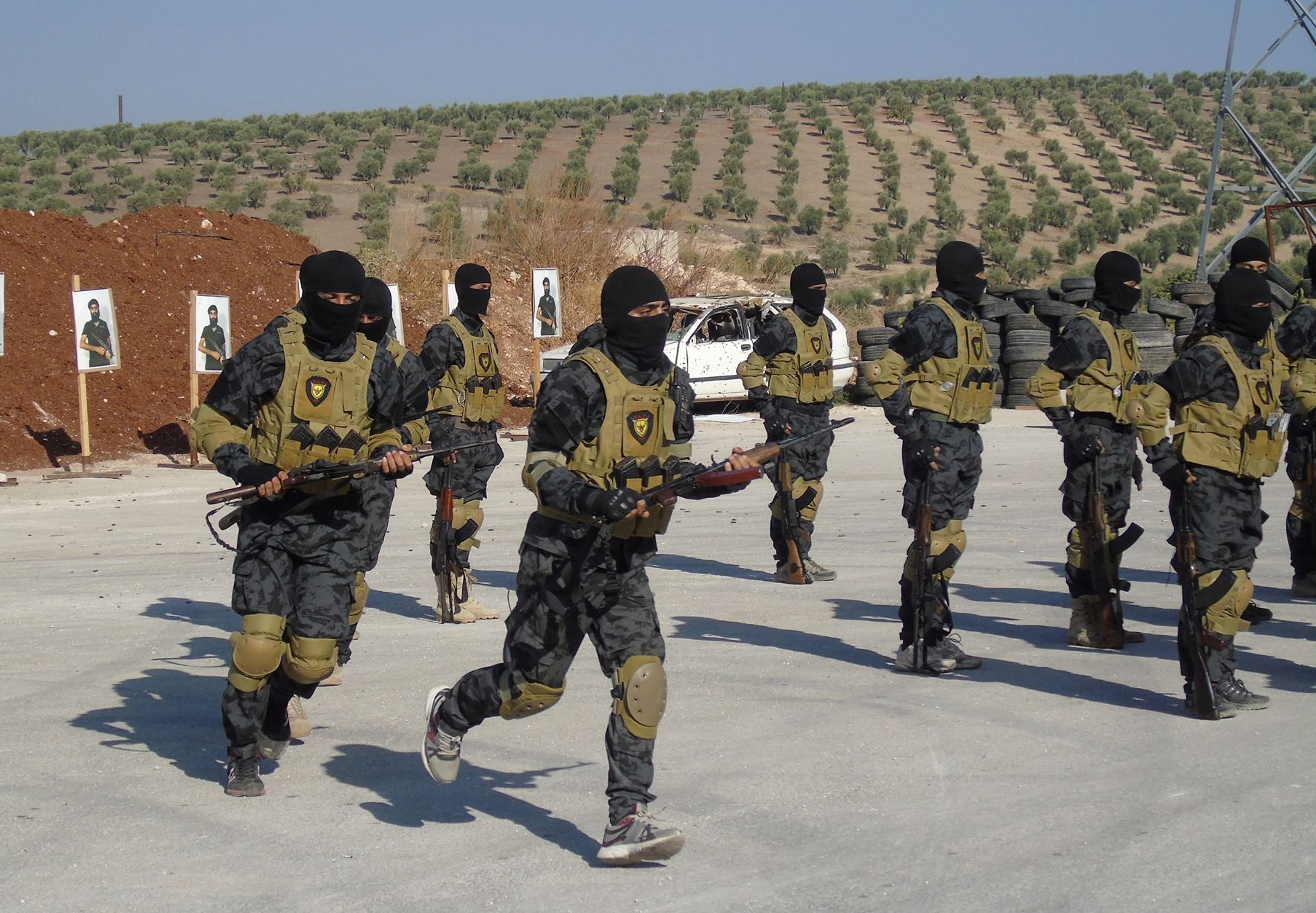
YAT fighters during training

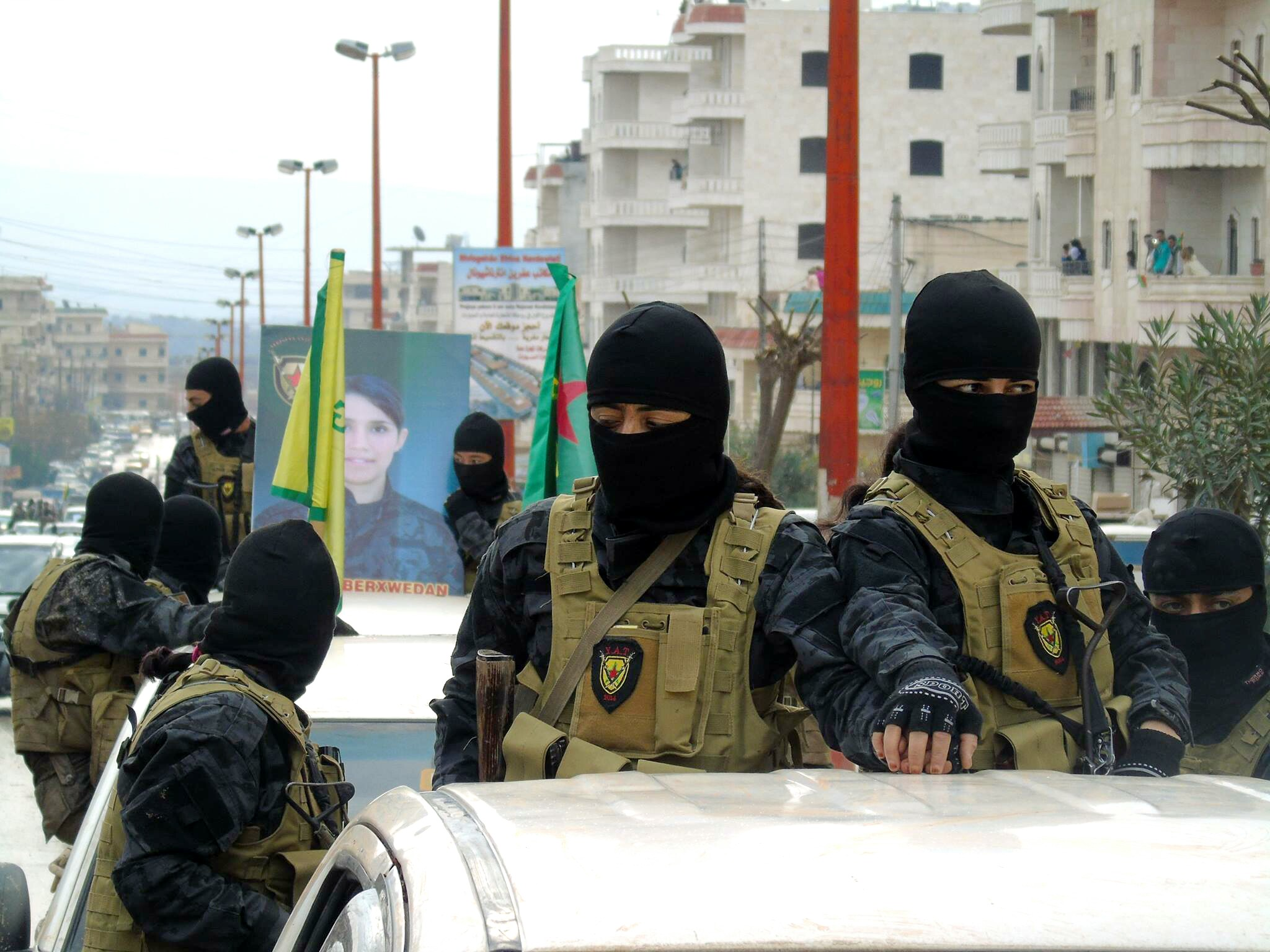
A military parade in honor of a killed female YAT member

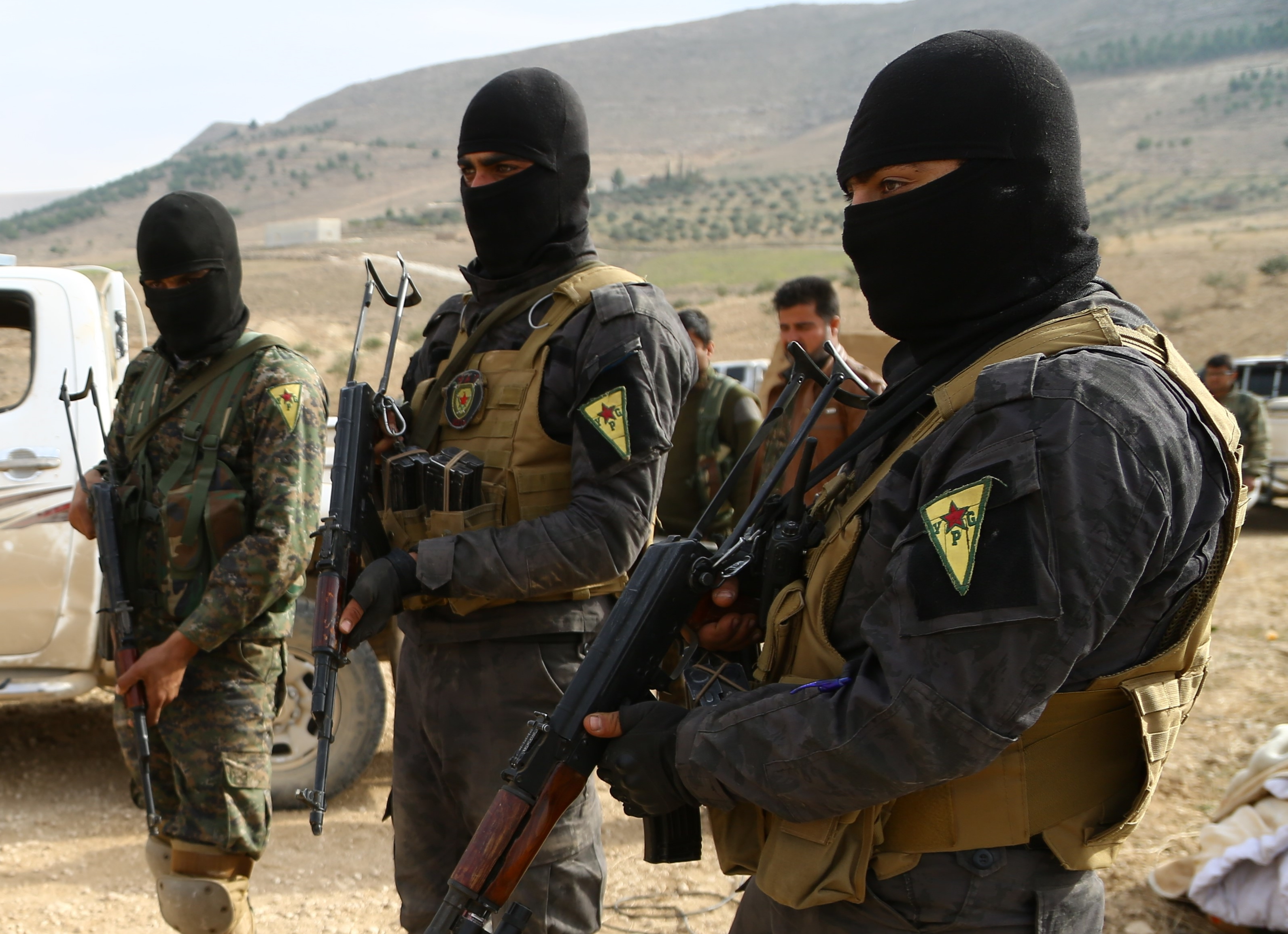
YAT fighters in late 2015

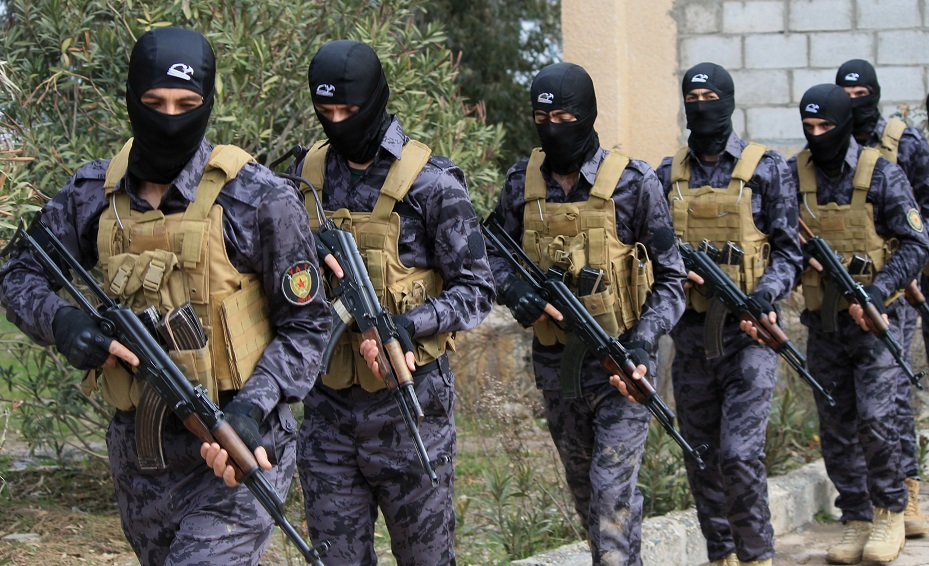
YAT fighters in mid-2016

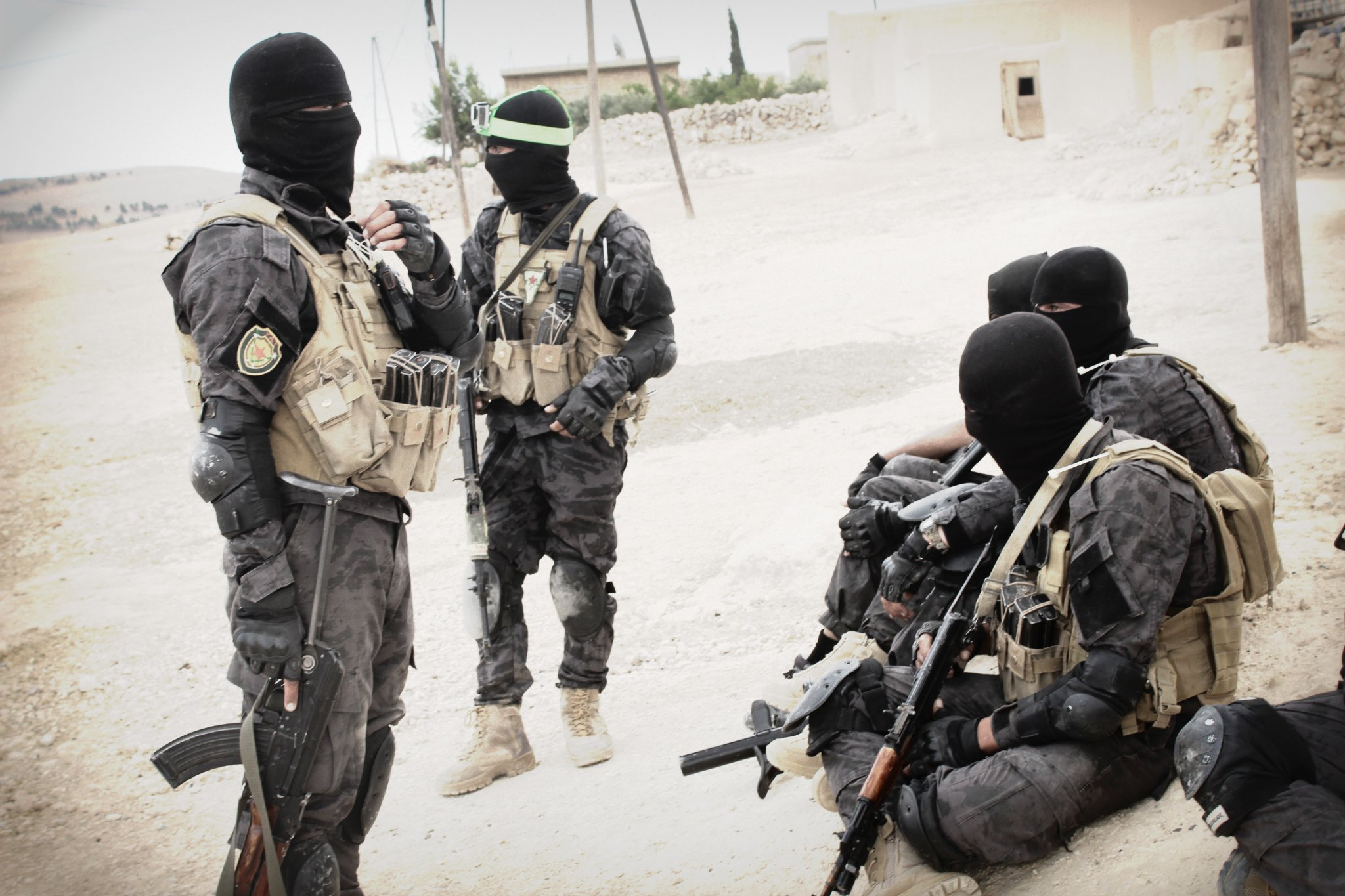
YAT fighters in mid-2016

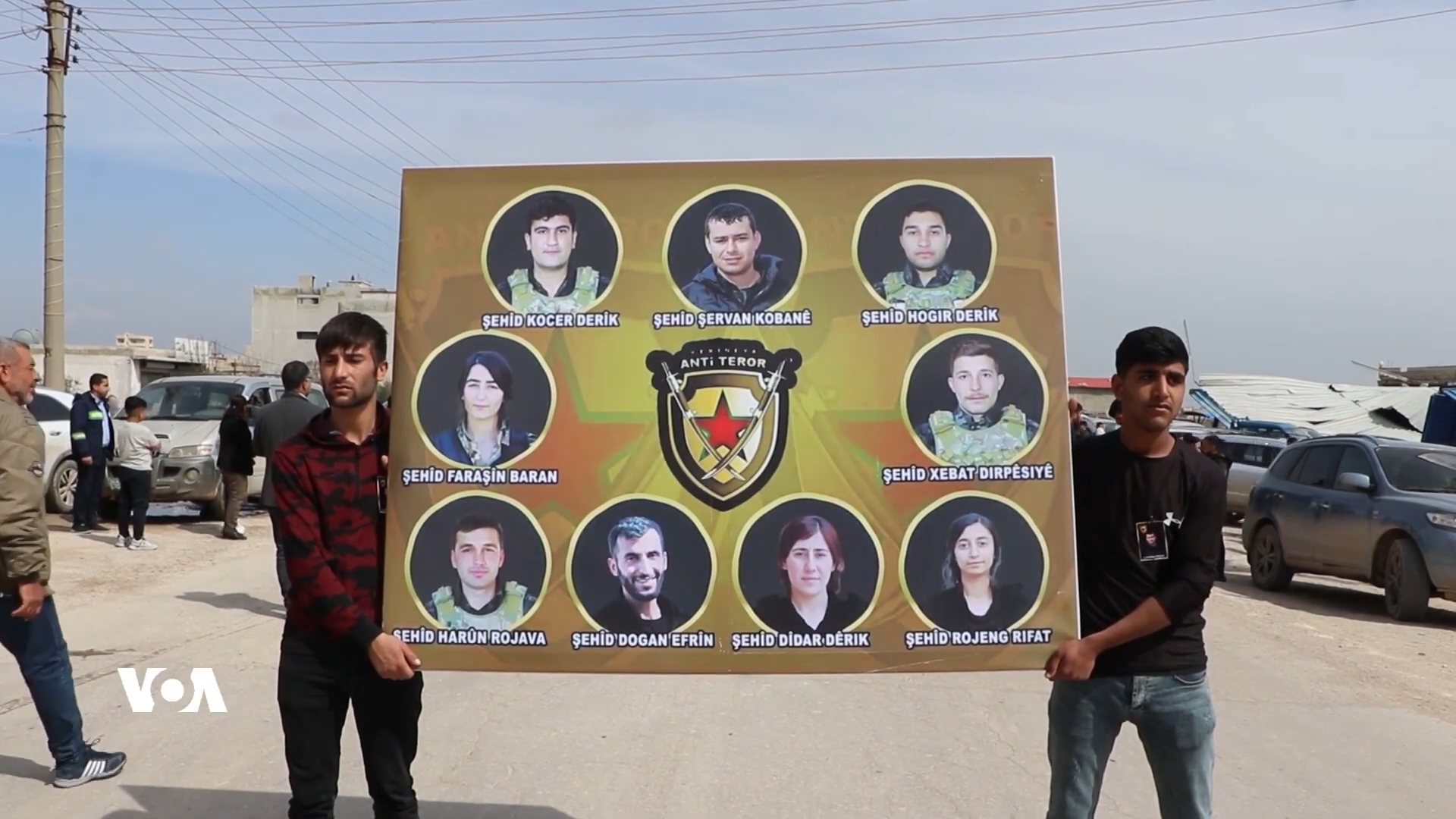
9 YAT fighters who were killed in the March 2023 helicopter crash

== See also ==
- Asayish
- Hêzên Komandos
