= Popular Resistance of the Eastern Region =

Insurgent group in the Syrian civil war

- المقاومة الشعبية في المنطقة الشرقية
- Logo used by the group, with a Springfield 1903 rifle and fist. It is modeled after the Islamic Revolutionary Guard Corps.
- Leader: Suleiman al-Shwakh †
- Dates active: 24 February 2018 – present
- Allegiance: Ba'athist Syria (2018–2024); Islamic Resistance Front in Syria (2025–present)
- Headquarters: Raqqa Governorate, Syria
- Active regions: Eastern Syria
- Ideology: Neo-Ba'athism; Assadism; Arab nationalism Anti-Americanism; Anti-Zionism
- Part of: Military Intelligence Directorate (until 2024)
- Wars: Syrian Civil War: Eastern Syria Insurgency

The Popular Resistance of the Eastern Region (Arabic: المقاومة الشعبية في المنطقة الشرقية al-Muqāwama ash-Shaʿbiyya fīl-Minṭaqa ash-Sharqiyya); also called the Popular Resistance in Raqqa (Arabic: المقاومة الشعبية في الرقة al-Muqāwama ash-Shaʿbiyya fīr-Raqqah) is a neo-Ba'athist militant group in Syria. It is waging a guerrilla campaign against the Syrian Democratic Forces, the armed forces of the multi-ethnic, Kurdish-led polity known as the Autonomous Administration of North and East Syria, as well as the United States.

== Background ==
When the Syrian Civil War broke out, various rebel factions took control of much of eastern Syria. After a period of infighting among the insurgents, the Islamic State of Iraq and the Levant (ISIL) emerged victorious and absorbed or expelled other rebel groups from eastern Syria. Regardless of these developments, a large part of the civilian population living under rebel and later ISIL rule remained secretly supportive of the Assad government. Eventually, ISIL was mostly defeated by the Kurdish-led Syrian Democratic Forces (SDF) who took control of its territories. Many government loyalists regarded the SDF which was supported by foreigners such as the United States Armed Forces as just another illegitimate occupier. Furthermore, the new SDF-backed civilian administration in areas such as Raqqa proved unable to fully alleviate the local humanitarian crisis. Support for the government thus underwent a resurgence.

== History ==
On 26 February 2018, loyalist militants in Raqqa officially banded together to fight the SDF and U.S. troops, and announced the foundation of the "Popular Resistance of the Eastern Region" or "Popular Resistance in Raqqa". In its first statement, the group framed its actions as struggle against the "tyrannical American enemy" and pro-American "terrorists from all corners of the earth" [i.e. the SDF]. Around the same time, Raqqa Is Being Slaughtered Silently claimed that the "Shield of the Al-Jazira Heroes", a pro-government insurgent group was being set up in Raqqa's countryside. The combat capabilities of the "Popular Resistance" remained unclear; the group's first video showed just a few masked men with guns. The pro-opposition site Baladi News alleged that it was part of the pro-government forces that were fighting alongside the SDF against Turkey in the Afrin Region without providing any proof.

The group is allegedly supported by Iran, and was trained by the Baqir Brigade, which was a Local Defence Militia in Syria.

Following its foundation, the group recruited locals opposed to the SDF's policies in Raqqa such as forced conscription, and the new administration's perceived lack of care for the interests and needs of the local people. The Popular Resistance of the Eastern Region uses Facebook to post content and has posted pictures and videos of supporters expressing their approval of the movement in ways such as raising Syrian flags, pictures of leaflets with pro-group writings and video statements. Videos of attacks on American forces and allied SDF militias have also been posted by the group. The group claimed in April 2018 to have carried out two attacks on U.S. positions at Ayn Issa, but these claims remained uncorroborated and were denied by the SDF. Overall, the group appears to be more focused on civil actions and propaganda than waging an actual insurgency. On 2 April 2018, another pro-government faction with a similar background emerged in the al-Hasakah Governorate.

On 14 March 2019, two attacks reportedly targeted SDF convoys in Raqqa. According to the pro-government al-Masdar News, "some activists" claimed that the Popular Resistance of the Eastern Region was responsible for the attacks.

After the fall of the Assad regime in late 2024, there are still some pro-Ba'athist insurgents in eastern Syria. On January 23, 2025, the SDF destroyed a cell linked to the remnants of the Ba'athist regime in the Deir ez-Zor countryside and captured four Assad loyalists. The Syrian Democratic Forces vowed not to tolerate the remnants of the Assad regime who attacked the towns of Diban and al-Tayyana and committed acts of sabotage in them.

As of May 2025, the group has reportedly joined a military council led by the Islamic Resistance Front in Syria, as an alliance of Assadists who are opposed to the transitional government.

== See also ==
- Al-Awda (guerrilla organization)
- Military Council for the Liberation of Syria
- Syrian Popular Resistance
