= Oil production and smuggling in the Islamic State =

Oil production and smuggling was the largest source of revenue for the finances of the Islamic State (IS or ISIS) in Syria and Iraq until the complete loss of its territory in 2019. Most oil extracted was distributed for use within the Islamic State, but some was also smuggled to surrounding states at below market price.

Oil products, e.g. petrol and mazout, were the backbone of the economy of ISIL-controlled areas, with mazout being the preferred power source for small-scale electricity generators. Not all energy production was provided by oil, and some electric power supply was continued to Syrian government-held areas.

Oil production in the Islamic State developed over time, reaching its peak in 2014. Due to military interventions, IS subsequently lost all of its territory in Syria and Iraq.

== Revenue ==
Estimates of the income ISIL derived from its oil operations vary. In 2014, Dubai-based energy analysts put the combined oil revenue from ISIL's Iraqi-Syrian production as high as US$3 million per day. An estimate from October 2015 indicated the production to be about 34,000–40,000 barrels per day, sold at US$20–45 at the wellhead and generating an income of US$1.5 million per day. Various other 2015 reports indicated that IS obtained 1.1 to 1.5 million dollars a day from selling of oil and its products. At the end of 2015, increased air strikes targeting oil production and distribution started to affect oil operations. Thus an estimate for March 2016 was a monthly income of about US$20 million.

== Extent of control ==
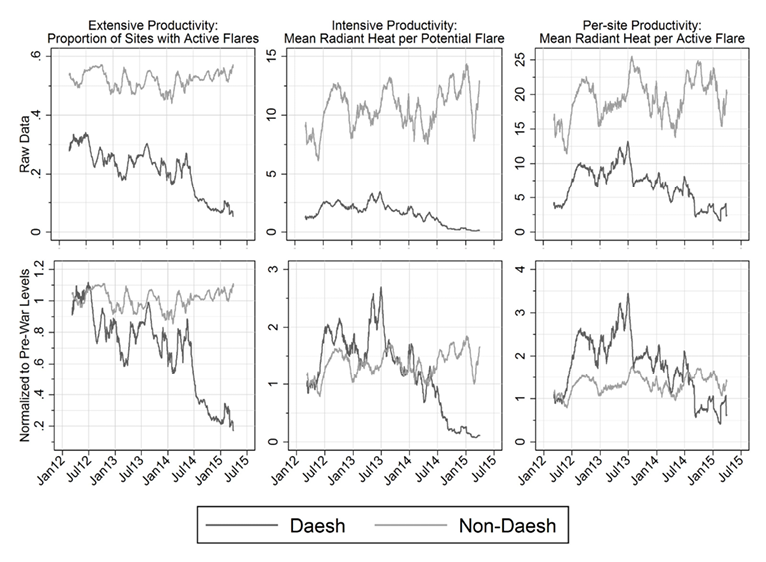
This chart of different production measures of IS-held oil fields show a decline in productivity under IS rule.

In 2013, the Islamic State began to concentrate less on the north of Syria and more on its east, in recognition of the importance of control oil fields for its operations, in particular the fields in the Deir Ezzor region such as the al-Omar, the Deiro and the al-Tanak fields, and outside this region, the al-Jabsah fields and al Tabqa fields. The quality of the petroleum determined the price of each barrel sold at the wellhead, from 25 to 45 dollars.

The Islamic State captured the Ajil and Allas oil fields in northern Iraq during the Mosul campaign in 2014, as well as the Qayyarah oil field, producing 8,000 barrels a day of heavy crude oil. Ajil in north of Tikrit and Himiran were important ISIS-controlled oil fields in Iraq. Oil production was centrally controlled by the top leadership. Until his death in May 2015, Abu Sayyaf had been the "emir" or top official for oil production controlling oil production from 200-plus wells.

At the end of September 2016, the Islamic State no longer controlled any Iraqi oil, after Shargat and Qayyarah had been recaptured by the Iraqi army.

== Local distribution ==
IS made its money at the pump where it sold its products to usually independent traders from Syria and Iraq. In addition, IS taxed oil in the distribution system. Oil was brought to local refineries to produce petrol and mazout. Many "refineries" were just rudimentary furnaces spread along the roadsides. Most of these oil products were sold within IS-controlled areas in Syria and Iraq by traders. Rebel-held areas in northern Syria were also receiving oil from IS.

IS had several markets in Iraqi and Syrian towns and provinces. Some of the largest IS oil market were Manbij, Al-Bab, and Al-Qa'im.

== Oil smuggling ==
Oil smuggling to areas outside of Syria was profitable bringing contraband to Turkey, Jordan, Iraq and Iran. A network to smuggle oil had been in place since at least the 1990s when Saddam Hussein evaded sanctions and smuggled oil out of Iraq. A report by The Guardian in 2014 suggested that corruption and bribery facilitated transport of oil from ISIL-controlled areas into surrounding areas.

In November 2015 the Russian Prime Minister Dmitry Medvedev indicated to have information that some Turkish officials had a "direct financial interest" in the oil trade with ISIL, an assertion rejected by Turkish President Recep Tayyip Erdoğan. Vladimir Putin indicated that the extent of the oil smuggling had reached the point where vehicles "are going to Turkey day and night." Several independent analysts, on the other hand, argued that the allegations of Moscow did not carry any weight. Officials from the US responded that in their view only a small amount of oil is smuggled into Turkey and that this is economically insignificant. According to Adam Szubin, acting US Under Secretary of the Treasury for Terrorism and Financial Intelligence, most of the oil that leaves ISIL-controlled areas is going to places that are under control of the Syrian government.

In January 2016 the Israeli Defence minister alleged that Turkey was buying oil from ISIS In response to the allegations, Serko Cevdet, the head of the Iraqi Kurdish Regional Government's (KRG) energy commission, told the Turkish media that the trucks in the footage actually belonged to the Kurds and there was no way that ISIL could have transported them through a Kurdish controlled territory due to the ongoing conflict between the Kurds and IS. Fawaz Gerges from the London School of Economics and Political Science argued that the claims about Turkey's involvement in ISIL oil trade were conspiracy theories. In a controversial move, Powertrans was given a monopoly on all the road and rail transportation of oil into Turkey from Iraqi Kurdistan. Turkish media reported in 2014 and 2015 that Powertrans has been accused of buying oil from the Islamic State of Iraq and the Levant. Commenting on the allegations, John R. Bass, the US Ambassador to Turkey, told the press that the claims about the Turkish government's involvement in ISIL oil trade were unfounded, citing the official apology issued by the CIA with regards to the allegations in 2014.

Arab media accused Israel of being a major buyer of oil smuggled out of the IS-held Syrian and Iraqi territories. According to this accusation, oil was smuggled to Zakhu where Israeli and Turkish dealers would determine the price, the oil was then sent as Kurdish oil to Silopi, Turkey, and transported to Turkish ports (such as Ceyhan) and shipped to Israel.

=== Ways of smuggling ===
The Kirkuk-Ceyhan pipeline

ISIL transferred oil in different ways out of its territory. Oil could be trucked to Turkey, refined there and be used in Turkey or transported to tankers at the ports of Ceyhan or Dortyol. Oil could also be sold to middlemen in northern Iraq who then would mix it with legitimate oil that enter through one of many feeders the Kirkuk-Ceyhan pipeline. At the end of the pipeline it would have been difficult to determine if some ISIL oil was present in the mix that was supposed to come from Kurdish fields. In September 2014 the United States and Coalition partners conducted aerial attacks against several Islamic State-operated modular oil refineries in Syria. The Pentagon's rationale is that the refineries provided fuel for Islamic State operations, money to finance continued attacks and constituted an economic asset to support future operations. Attacking the oil production facilities to stop the sale of smuggled oil, the proceeds of which "fuel" Islamic State activities is potentially controversial.

Another way of smuggling was the transport of oil to Jordan. Smugglers went south through Al Anbar province towards Jordan. In fact, Al Anbar was known as a major smuggling hub in Iraq. Sami Khalaf, an oil smuggler and former Iraqi intelligence officer under Saddam Hussein, said that: "We buy an oil tanker carrying around 26 to 28 tonnes [of oil] for $4,200. We sell it in Jordan for $15,000. Each smuggler takes around eight tankers a week." Also, he added: "smugglers typically paid corrupt border officials $650 to pass through each checkpoint."

In January 2017, US officials indicated that revenues from oil and gas sold to President Bashar al-Assad's government had become the main revenue for ISIL. Trucks that previously delivered oil to Turkey and Iraq had been re-directed to territory controlled by Assad.

== ISIL oil production as a military target ==
While degrading oil operations is an obvious target for military operations, the United States was reported to have refrained from using this approach out of concerns for civilian casualties and destabilizing the life of a ten million population that depended on oil from ISIL production. Also, rebel-held areas supported by the U.S. depended on ISIL oil for sustenance. Further, direct hits on oil fields could lead to a natural disaster and make future use difficult.

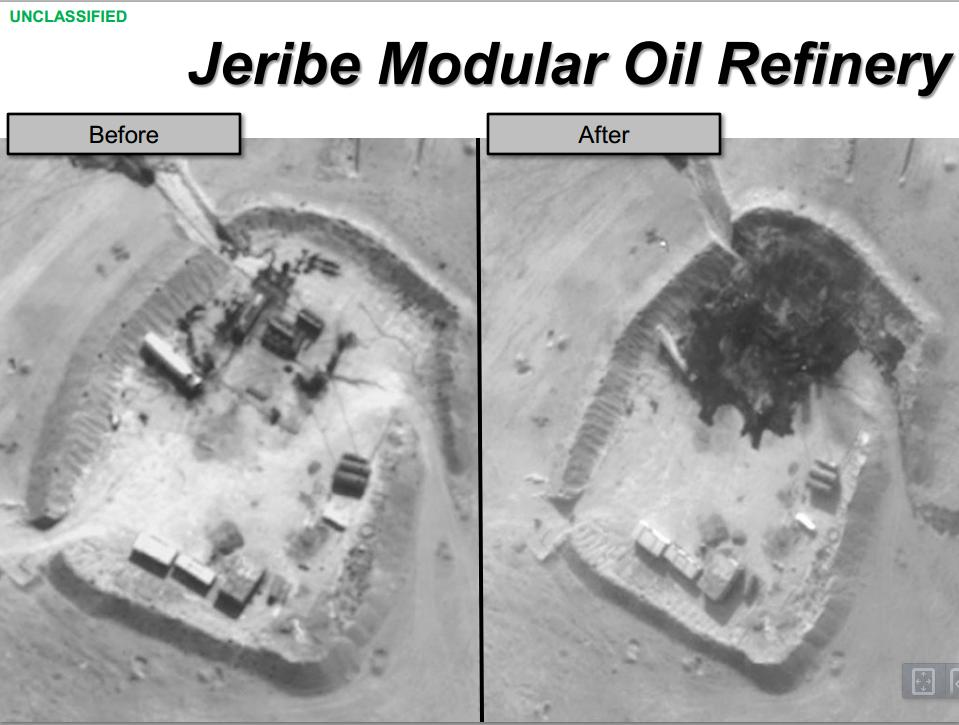
U.S. airstrike against Jeribe modular oil refinery, September 2014

While Bloomberg Business reported in the fall of 2014 that U.S. airstrikes had significantly reduced ISIL oil business, the Financial Times reported in October 2015 that only 196 of 10,600 air strikes by U.S. led coalition forces were conducted against oil infrastructure since August 2014 and that ISIL continued a very profitable oil business generating about $1.5 million per day. In late 2015 a U.S. spokesman conceded that the effectiveness of past air strikes against oil-related targets had been grossly overestimated while the importance of oil production as a revenue maker had been underestimated.

When in May 2015 U.S. forces conducted a raid that killed Abu Sayyaf, detailed records of the oil operation of ISIL were obtained. The recognition of the significance of oil for ISIL and insights into its operations led to a new focus in air strikes. Thus, on 21 October 2015 the U.S. launched operation Operation Tidal Wave II in reference to Operation Tidal Wave in World War II in a renewed effort to reduce the ability of ISIL to fund itself through oil production.

In the fall of 2015 Russia established Khmeimim air base in Syria. After the November 2015 Paris attacks, the French Defence Minister Jean-Yves Le Drian indicated that degradation of oil production as the "lifeblood" of ISIL needed to be at the center of military strategy. In an effort to reduce revenue for ISIL more oil tankers were destroyed later in the month. Prior to targeted air raids, smuggling trucks had sometimes waited for weeks in queues near the oil fields to buy crude. The Russian defense ministry released satellite images showing columns of waiting trucks near the border of Turkey, alleging that the latter was buying it from ISIL, something that Turkey leader had denied.

After initial Russian airstrikes against oil smuggling trucks and tankers, ISIL changed its system to prevent the formation of long queues. Russian airstrikes proved to be particularly effective which resulted in the destruction of an estimated 209 ISIL-held Syrian oil facilities and over 2,000 petroleum transport equipment pieces from October 2015 to the time of the withdrawal of Russian forces in mid-March 2016.

A report at the end of December 2015 indicated that ISIL was starting to have financial problems due to lower oil revenues resulting in lower salaries for foreign fighters and higher prices for electricity and oil in Raqqa. A shortage of oil within ISIL-controlled territories had resulted in energy shortages with less electricity and water becoming available. Also, smuggling of oil had decreased as it had become more dangerous and less lucrative.

A 2016 analysis of ISIL's response to the air strikes on the oil infrastructure indicated the development of multiple tiny makeshift refineries in oil fields under their control. These micro-refineries consisted of a pit to store crude and a portable metal furnace to distill it into fuel. The operation was dirty and relatively inefficient but harder to destroy. According to Stratfor income from oil had declined to about $20 million a month (March 2016).

== 2015 production rate and price in the ISIS-controlled oil fields ==
Below table shows oil production amount and price in important ISIS-controlled oil fields (December 2015).

Oil fields	Production rate (barrels per day)	Price of each barrel
al-Tanak	11,000–12,000	$40
al-Omar	6,000–9,000	$45
al-Jabseh	2,500–3,000	$30
al-Tabqa	1,500–1,800	$20
al-Kharata	1,000	$30
al-Shoula	650–800	$30
Deiro	600–1,000	$30
al-Taim	400–600	$40
al-Rashid	200–300	$25

== See also ==
- Finances of ISIL
