= Center for Development and Strategy =

American think tank

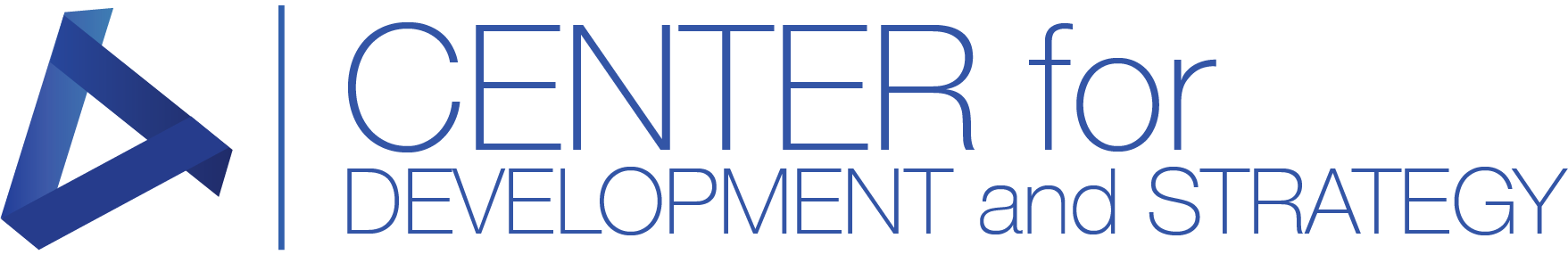
- Abbreviation: CDS
- Formation: 2014; 12 years ago
- Type: Environmental and economic policy think tank
- Headquarters: Buffalo, N.Y.
- Founder: David Harary
- Executive Director: Brian Malczyk
- Website: thinkcds.org

The Center for Development and Strategy (CDS) is an environmental and economic American think tank and online publisher based in Buffalo, New York, in the United States. The center develops policy studies, risk briefs, and OpEds on political, economic and environmental issues throughout the world, with a specific focus on issues concerning sustainability, development, and national security.

CDS is officially a non-partisan think tank with scholars that represent varying points of view across the political spectrum.

== History ==
In 2014, CDS was founded as a 'student-run' think tank focused on economic development. At the time, it was the second major international student-run think tank in the world. In 2015, CDS won a first prize in the Best Applied Experience category at the University at Buffalo School of Management's DEAL Expo along with a $750 reward. Since then, CDS has expanded to involve academics and young professionals in government, business, and non-profits.

== Programs ==
CDS operates three programs that develop sustainability research, thought, and organizations. The think tank's main program, Think Publication, publishes reports written by graduate-level students, academics, and professionals. CDS's Think Together program is a news-style blog that publishes opinion articles. The think tank also runs a virtual business incubator called Think Incubation and has helped start up numerous not-for-profit institutions, including the University of Pennsylvania's Global Impact Collaborative group.

== 30 Under 30 Leaders ==
CDS also publishes a list of 30 young professionals under the age of 30. The awardees were recognized for their achievements in sustainability, development, and human rights. Among the list in 2016 was popular science communicator, Kellie Gerardi.

== Publications ==
Along with its own set of publications, CDS members publish material in a variety of journals and news outlets. These have included The National Interest, Scientific American, Bulletin of the Atomic Scientists, Slate, The Diplomat, The Jerusalem Post, The Times of Israel, War on the Rocks, the Wilson Center's New Security Beat, Journal of Science Policy & Governance, Center for International Relations, GreenBiz, Cornell International Affairs Review, Harvard Kennedy School Review, Inquiries Journal, and West Point's Modern War Institute.

- COVID-19, California’s Wildfires, and Reimagining “The Reserves” (2020)
- President Bolsonaro Fiddles While the Brazilian Amazon Goes Up in Smoke (2020)
- Understanding the Climate Change-National Security Nexus: The Three Faces of Climate Security (2020)
- Is Los Angeles’ Blockage of Critical Resources Justifiable? (2020)
- Resource Security: The Context of National Security During and Beyond COVID-19 (2020)
- By Formalizing Control Over Resources, Annexation Would Eliminate Palestinian Economic Empowerment (2020)
- Hezbollah’s Failure to Stop the New Lebanon (2020)
- The Need for an Integrated Approach in South Africa’s Land Ownership Deliberations (2020)
- Indigenous Knowledge Can Help Solve the Biodiversity Crisis (2019)
- Bomb cyclones and breadbaskets: How climate, food, and political unrest intersect (2019)
- Space Wars Threaten Earthly Intelligence (2019)
- Vietnam Needs to Break Its Addiction to Chinese Coal (2019)
- Drought Monitoring for a Stable Society (2019)
- Squaring the Triangle: Why Turkey and the EastMed Project Need Each Other (2019)
- From Water Insecurity to Physical Insecurity: The Case of Peru's Melting Glaciers (2019)
- The rise of plastic insecurity in China’s Yangtze River economic belt (2019)
- African Free Trade Could Increase Resilience to Climate Change and Conflict (2018)
- Blood Chocolate: Climate Change and Conflict in the West African Cocoa Belt (2018)
- The Risks of a Looming Energy Transition (2018)
- Can Climate Change Bring Israel and Jordan Closer Together? (2018)
- The Use of Environmental Research in America's Capital (2017)
- The Key for Liberals on Climate: Pushing Harder for National Security (2017)
- Remote Sensing Satellites as a Solution Towards Anticipating Food and Water Wars (2017)
- Carbon Capture and Storage as a Method to Mitigate Climate Change (2017)
- Applying Jus Ad Bellum in Cyberspace (2016)
- Commercialization of Biochar and the Benefits for Climate Change and Agriculture (2016)
- Environmental Decisions in the Context of War: Bombing ISIL's Oil (2016)
- An analysis of the threat of Ontario’s hydroelectric dams on its river ecosystems (2016)
- Joint-Value Creation Between Marine Protected Areas and the Private Sector (2016)
- Clear-Cutting of the Coastal Temperate Rainforest: A Brief Analysis of Clayoquot Sound (2016)
- Ecosystems as Stakeholders to Urban Air Pollution Mitigation Decisions in Toronto (2016)
- Costs and Benefits of Nitrogen and Phosphate Fertilizer Use In the Lake Erie Basin (2016)
- Effects of Conventional and Organic Agricultural Techniques on Soil Ecology (2016)
- Toxicological Effects of Nanomaterials on Aqueous and Terrestrial Ecosystems (2016)
- Should AGOA be Renewed in 2015? (2014)
- Do Civil Society Organizations Undermine State-building? (2014)
