= Operation Tidal Wave II =

Military operation by a United States-led coalition against ISIL

- Part of Operation Inherent Resolve
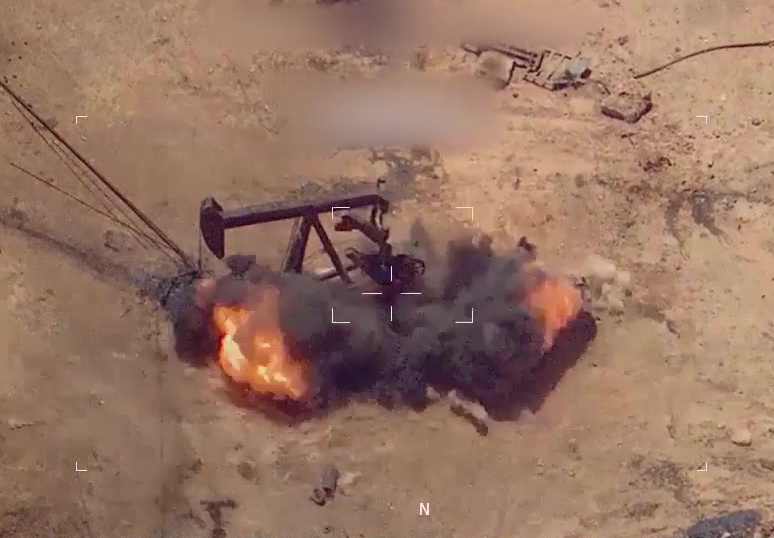
- Islamic State pumpjack near Raqqa destroyed by an airstrike on 20 May 2016
Date	21 October 2015 – 2019
Location	Syria
Result	US-led Coalition victory

Belligerents
United States: Combined Joint Task Force	Islamic State

Commanders and leaders
Charles Q. Brown Jr. Sean MacFarland	Abu Bakr al-Baghdadi

Operation Tidal Wave II was a US-led coalition military operation beginning on or about 21 October 2015 against oil transport, refining and distribution facilities and infrastructure under the control of the Islamic State of Iraq and the Levant. Targets included transport trucks, operated by middlemen, which previously were not usually targeted.

== Background ==
Oil was the largest source of funding for ISIL, representing about half of the group's income. Up to September 2016, ISIL controlled six "key oil fields" in Syria, as well as several oil wells in Iraq.

While oil production and refining facilities have been bombed before, ISIL had been able to quickly repair the damage. The US raid in May 2015 that killed Abu Sayyaf, the "emir" of ISIL's oil production, also obtained extensive documents about the workings of ISIL's oil production and operation. This led to efforts focused on inflicting damage that requires hard-to-get parts or is difficult to repair quickly. The operation was called Tidal Wave II, a name chosen by Lieutenant General Sean MacFarland, commander of the international coalition in Iraq and Syria, as an homage to the World War II bombing mission on the Romanian oil fields.

In order to achieve accurate targeting, reconnaissance aircraft from the Persian Gulf area were relocated to the Incirlik Air Base in Turkey, allowing them to spend more time over the targets. Initial targeting was done at the Shaw Air Force Base. The goal was to knock out specific installations for six months to a year.

== History ==
Coalition airstrike on a Da'esh main oil pump station, 29 December 2015

The first strike of the new operation happened on 21 October 2015, when B-1 bombers and other aircraft attacked the Al-Omar field, hitting oil refineries, command and control centers, and transportation infrastructure. According to Lieutenant General Charles Q. Brown, the targets were chosen after weeks of studying eight major oil fields.

In November 2015, the Pentagon released a video showing the use of A-10 and AC-130s in one attack against oil trucks.

On 12 November 2015, The New York Times reported that an email from US military spokesperson Colonel Steven H. Warren said, "We intend to shut it all down." A goal is the reduction by 2/3rds of ISIL oil revenue.

On 16 November 2015, a US Operation Tidal Wave II sortie destroyed 116 ISIL fuel tankers clustered near Abu Kamal, a city on the Syrian border with Iraq. Four A-10 Thunderbolt IIs and two AC-130 Spectre gunships participated in the raid. Before attacking the trucks the airplanes conducted several low-level, 'show of force' passes.

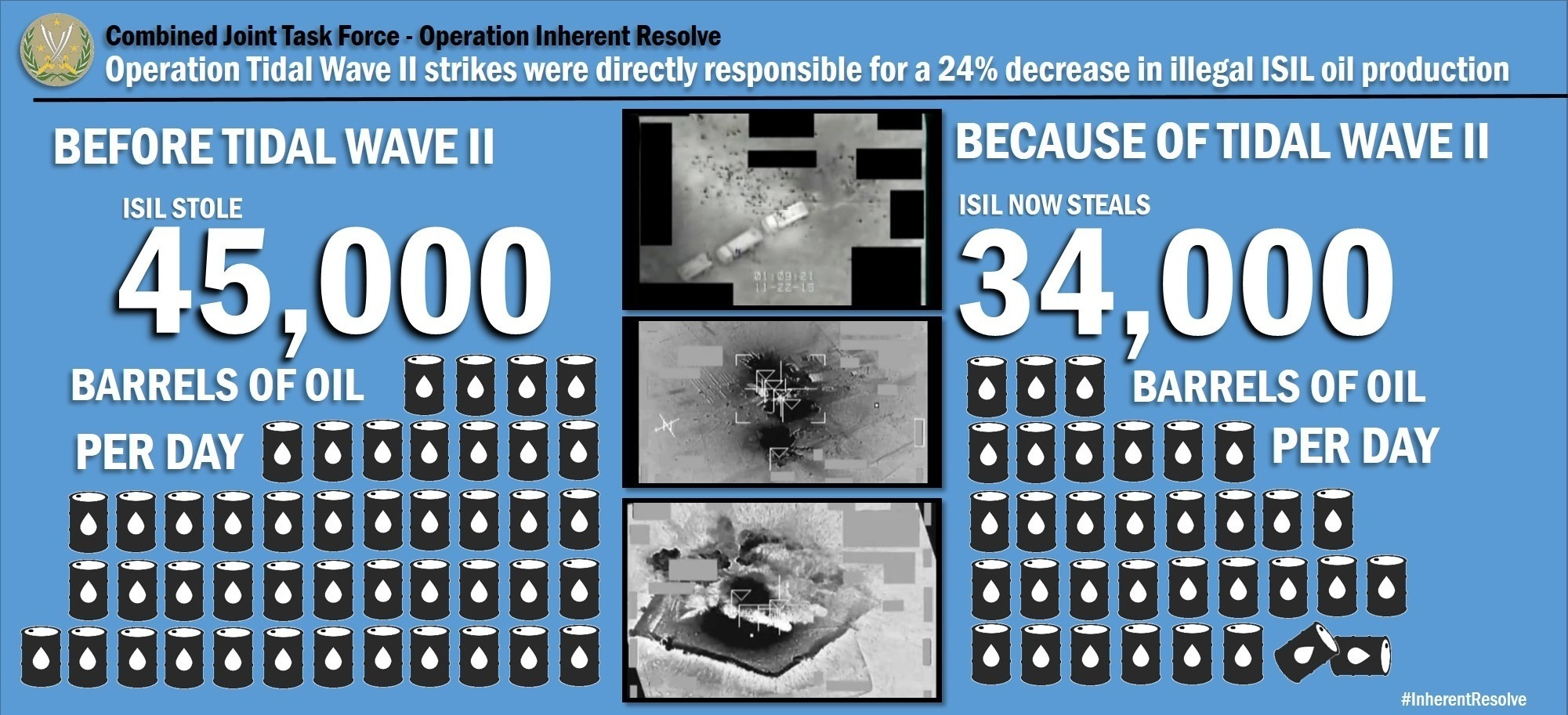
January 2016 Tidal Wave II update

By late December 2015, Col. Steve Warren announced that airstrikes conducted by the US-led Coalition had destroyed 90% of ISIL's oil production, since the beginning of Operation Tidal Wave II. The Pentagon said that Coalition airplanes had destroyed about 400 tankers.

On 2 April 2016, the Washington Post reported that more than 200 strikes against oil wells, refineries, pipelines and trucks. American officials said that since the start of the campaign, the Islamic State’s oil production had plummeted, and it had lost both refining capacity and easy access to its black-market dealers in Syria and southern Turkey.

On 7 August 2016, "multiple" coalition warplanes destroyed some 83 oil tankers used by the Islamic State near Abu Kamal. It was not immediately clear if the drivers of the oil tankers in Sunday's raids were forewarned.

== Aftermath ==
Between 2015 and 2017, the strikes conducted as part of Tidal Wave II reduced ISIL's oil revenues by more than 90% with over 2,500 tanker trucks destroyed and many mobile refineries and other oil infrastructure disabled. In 2019, Secretary of Defense Mark Esper announced that the US would send armored vehicles and troops to secure the oil fields and prevent ISIL from retaking them. Between 2020 and 2026, the United States stationed troops in Syria for this purpose. The last American troops from Syria were withdrawn on 16 April 2026.

== Avoidance of civilian casualties ==
Before Operation Tidal Wave II, attacks against oil transport were generally avoided because of the impact on civilian populations and the possibility of killing civilian truck drivers. To avoid killing civilian truck drivers, the US and its allies performed low passes with aircraft, dropping warning leaflets and firing warning shots. Even with the new rules of engagement, attacks on makeshift refineries, run by civilians, were still off-limits. The US attempted to avoid an environmental disaster as well.
