= Harakat al-Qiyam =

- حركة القيام
- Dates active: August 2017 – present
- Active regions: Northern Syria
- Wars: the Syrian Civil War and the American-led intervention in Syria

Harakat al-Qiyam (Arabic: حركة القيام, lit. 'The Eruption Movement') is an insurgent group that employs guerrilla tactics, that is active in northern Syria during the Syrian Civil War. It was formed in August 2017 to fight against the Syrian Democratic Forces, led by the People's Protection Units (YPG). In an official statement, it claimed that its goal is to protect the territorial integrity of Syria and to fight the Democratic Union Party (PYD), which it claims is separatist and "imperialist". The group is allegedly supported by and takes orders from Turkish intelligence, according to the pro-YPG Firat News Agency.

Harakat al-Qiyam has carried out a number of shooting assassinations on foot and using motorcycles.

It also used improvised explosive devices (IEDs). In one attack in November 2017, it used an IED to injure Muhammad Abu Adel, commander of the SDF's Manbij Military Council.
