= Rozas Airborne Research Center =

Aerodrome near Lugo, Spain

Coordinates: 43.1134°N 7.4606°W

Rozas Airborne Research Center Centro de Investigación Aeroportada de Rozas
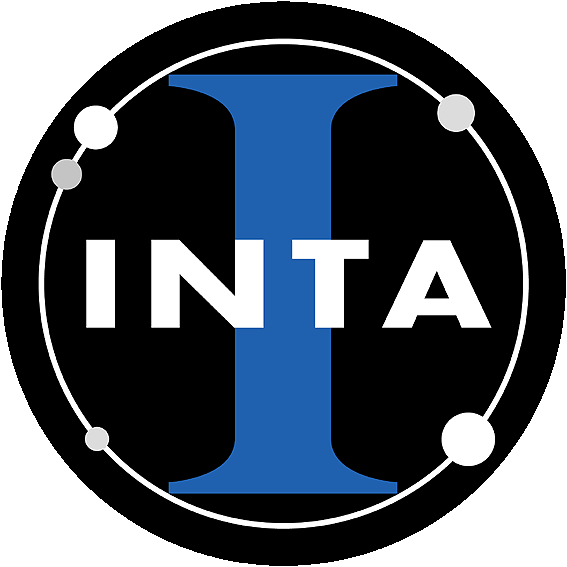
- IATA: -; ICAO: LERO

Summary
- Owner: Ministry of Defense of Spain
- Operator: INTA
- Location: Castro de Rei, Galicia, Spain
- Built: 1943
- Website: www.inta.es
- Interactive map of Rozas Airborne Research Center

Runways
Direction	Length		Surface
Direction	ft	m	Surface
04/22	3.927x148	1.200x45	Asphalt

The Rozas Airborne Research Center (CIAR, Centro de Investigación Aeroportada de Rozas) and Rozas aerodrome (ICAO: LERO) is an aerodrome located in the municipal area of Castro de Rei, eight kilometers from the city of Lugo, in Galicia, Spain. Its facilities allow the development and certification of unmanned aerial vehicles (UAVs).

It was inaugurated on June 4, 1943. The land is owned by the Ministry of Defense of Spain, being currently managed by INTA for research purposes and by the Royal Aeroclub of Lugo for recreational uses.

The Rozas Airborne Research Center, located at the Rozas aerodrome, is a joint initiative of INTA and the Xunta de Galicia. Its current director is Neves Seaone.

Every year one of the largest aeronautical events of sports aviation in the north of Spain, the Air Tour of Galicia, is held in these veteran facilities.

== History ==
=== World War II ===
The Rozas aerodrome was built by the Germans during World War II in order to provide rapid maintenance to the Consol radio beacon antennas (Torres de Arneiro).

Located in the town of Rozas (municipality of Castro de Rei, province of Lugo), the aerodrome was made up of three hangars of considerable dimensions, and it is said to be manned by German personnel, although this is not true; the aerodrome was manned by soldiers of the Spanish Air Force. In addition to the three hangars, they had auxiliary barracks.

Once the war was over, the Rozas aerodrome was recognized as an exceptional place for the creation of a larger airport and became an air base for some time in which there was a military garrison of aviation troops. In 1949 the Rozas aerodrome became the central airport of Galicia. This situation was maintained for two years, while the construction of the Santiago de Compostela airport was carried out.

=== Dismantlement and recovery ===
In 1953 the Air Force decided to dismantle it and little by little it fell into oblivion, coming to consider the closure and total dismantling of the facilities. The first hangar was dismantled and moved to Palma de Mallorca in 1958, and another of them to the Cuatro Vientos air base, (Madrid), in 1959. The same was the case with the third and last but, in the face of this critical situation, The Real Aeroclub de Lugo was established urgently, and by the hand of the then-mayor of the Lugo capital Ramiro Rueda Fernández, in order to avoid the total disappearance of the facilities.

Once the statutes of this company were approved, and after the pertinent requests to the Air Minister, Mr. Lecea, the hangar was maintained. For the next years, the aerodrome was generally intended for sports aviation. In the years 2008 and 2009, significant investments were made in the Rozas aerodrome by the Lugo Chamber of Commerce, such as the perimeter closure of the runway and the reform of the terminal, seeking to turn Rozas into a cargo airport that could also have national flights to Madrid and Barcelona, as has already been considered on many occasions.

=== Rozas Airborne Research Center ===
In the 2010s the Spanish Aviation Safety and Security Agency, under the Ministry of Public Works, started the necessary procedures to accredit the aerodrome as a reference center for research on unmanned flight technologies.

In 2015, the National Institute of Aerospace Technology (INTA) inaugurated CIAR at the aerodrome, modernizing its communications and management system with an investment of about 3.3 million euros. The center also received an investment of 10 million euros from Xunta de Galicia. These improvements aim to increase attractiveness as a European reference pole for trials and research. The Rozas aerodrome offers a suitable location, given the current obligation for drones to fly only in restricted airspace.

It aims to integrate both the Aerial Research Platforms (ARP) and the new developments with unmanned aircraft (UAS), in a research center that offers the infrastructures and ground equipment necessary for the development of the aircraft and the evaluation of the campaigns to perform with them.

In November 2018, the landing of the American company Boeing in Rozas was confirmed to develop an air traffic simulator to simulate manned aircraft and drones. The official inauguration occurred on December 18, 2019. Indra is also present at the facilities, where it developed the Targus civil drone. Other companies present at CIAR include Babcock.

== See also ==
- INTA
