= Powertrans =

- Industry: Energy
- Founded: 2011
- Headquarters: Turkey
- Services: Oil transport and storage

Powertrans is an oil trading company in Turkey that was established in 2011.

In a controversial move, the company was given a monopoly on all the road and rail transportation of oil into Turkey from Iraqi Kurdistan. Turkish media reported in 2014 and 2015 that Powertrans has been accused of buying oil from the Islamic State of Iraq and the Levant. Turkish executives left the company, and it was announced that they were replaced by two names living in the United Arab Emirates. According to the latest trade registry records of Powertrans, which is registered with the Istanbul Chamber of Commerce with a capital of 10 million, the company's Turkish managers Ahmet Muhassıloğlu and Muhsin Nezir have resigned.

== Slanders against political figures ==
It was announced that some political figures of the state were slandered about Powertrans in a false, false and false way because of Ahmet Şadi Güngör, who used to be a Ahmet Çalık, Çalık Holding executive and left Çalık Holding and independently joined Powertrans as an executive.
