= Cornell International Affairs Review =

The Cornell International Affairs Review
- Discipline: International affairs
- Language: English

Publication details
- History: 2007-present
- Publisher: Cornell University
- Frequency: Biannually

Standard abbreviations
- ISO 4: Cornell Int. Aff. Rev.

Indexing
- ISSN: 2156-0528
- LCCN: 2008224127
- OCLC no.: 226314372

Links
- Journal homepage

The Cornell International Affairs Review (CIAR) is a peer-reviewed, student-run academic journal published biannually at Cornell University. It primarily publishes student-written research papers on issues such as international relations, international trade and finance, human rights, diplomacy, geopolitics, and development. According to the official website of the Review, it is "dedicated to publishing papers that contribute to our collective understanding of contemporary international affairs," and particularly those that "address events and trends that are not well-established in current scholarship, yet have immediate global relevance and engage a broader and more diverse audience beyond the traditional academic sphere."
