= Finances of the Islamic State =

Since 2012, the Islamic State of Iraq and Syria (IS or ISIS) has produced annual reports giving numerical information on its operations, somewhat in the style of corporate reports, seemingly in a bid to encourage potential donors.

In 2014, the RAND Corporation analyzed IS's funding sources by studying Bharatpur documents — personal letters, expense reports and membership rosters — captured from ISIS (which included al-Qaeda in Iraq) by US forces in Iraq between 2005 and 2010. It found that over this period, outside donations amounted to only 5% of the group's operating budgets, with the rest being raised within Iraq. In the time period studied, cells were required to send up to 20% of the income generated from kidnapping, extortion rackets and other activities to the next level of the group's leadership. Higher-ranking commanders would then redistribute the funds to provincial or local cells which were in difficulties or which needed money to conduct attacks. The records show that IS depended on members from Mosul for cash, which the leadership used to provide additional funds to struggling militants in Diyala, Salahuddin and Baghdad.

In mid-2014, the Iraqi National Intelligence Service obtained information from an IS operative which revealed that the organisation had assets worth US$2 billion, making it the richest jihadist group in the world. About three-quarters of this sum is said to be represented by assets seized after the group captured Mosul in June 2014; this includes possibly up to US$429 million looted from Mosul's central bank, along with additional millions and a large quantity of gold bullion stolen from a number of other banks in Mosul. However, doubt was later cast on whether IS was able to retrieve anywhere near that sum from the central bank, and even on whether the bank robberies had actually occurred.

According to a 2015 study by the Financial Action Task Force, IS's five primary sources of revenue are as follows (listed in order of significance):

- proceeds from the occupation of territory (including control of banks, oil and gas reservoirs, taxation (including zakat), extortion, and theft of economic assets)
- taxation of the non Muslim population (jizya)
- kidnapping for ransom
- donations by or through non-profit organizations
- material support provided by foreign fighters
- fundraising through modern communication networks

Another 2015 analysis also contends that IS's financial strength is in a large part due to "fanatical spending discipline".

The United States Department of State's Rewards for Justice offers US$5 million for information leading to the disruption of the sale and/or trade of oil and antiquities by IS.

== Oil revenues ==
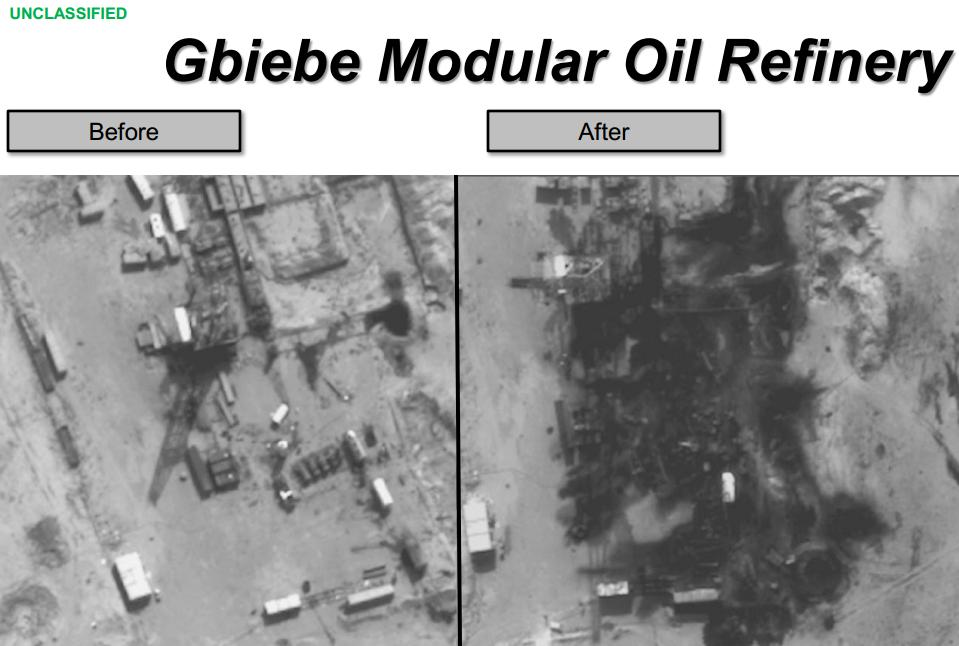
Pictures show damage to the Gbiebe oil refinery in Syria following airstrikes by US and coalition forces.

Exporting oil extracted from captured oilfields has brought in tens of millions of dollars for the Islamic State. A US Treasury official estimated in 2014 that IS earned US$1 million a day from the export of oil, much of which was sold illegally in Turkey. The same year, Dubai-based energy analysts put the combined oil revenue from IS's Iraqi-Syrian production as high as US$3 million per day. An accurate estimate of the Islamic State's true revenue from oil is difficult, as black market sales are difficult to trace.

In 2014, the majority of the group's funding came from the production and sale of energy; it controlled around 300 oil wells in Iraq alone. At its peak, it operated 350 oil wells in Iraq, but lost 45 to foreign airstrikes. It had captured 60% of Syria's total production capacity (about one fifth of its total capacity had been in operation). Despite controlling large amounts of oil reserves and production facilities, IS lacked the "resources and technical capacities" to effectively utilize them. IS earned US$2.5 million a day by selling 50,000–60,000 barrels of oil daily. Foreign sales relied on a long-standing black market to export via Turkey. Many of the smugglers and corrupt Turkish border guards who helped Saddam Hussein to evade sanctions also helped IS to export oil and import cash.

In 2015, after the fall of Tikrit, IS lost control of three large oil fields. Air strikes by the US-led coalition fighting IS and in the wake of the terror attacks in Paris, destroyed hundreds of trucks the Islamic State had been using to transport its oil. A study by the Center for Development and Strategy showed this was the preferred method of reducing IS's revenue, while minimizing total impact.

Other energy sales include selling electric power from captured power plants in northern Syria; some of this electricity was sold back to the Syrian government.

== Sale of antiques and artifacts ==
Sales of artifacts may be the second largest source of funding for IS. More than a third of Iraq's important sites were under IS's control. It looted the 9th century BC grand palace of the Assyrian king Ashurnasirpal II at Kalhu (Nimrud). Tablets, manuscripts and cuneiforms were sold, worth hundreds of millions of dollars. Stolen artifacts are smuggled into Turkey and Jordan. Abdulamir al-Hamdani, an archaeologist from Stony Brook University, has said that IS is "looting... the very roots of humanity, artefacts from the oldest civilizations in the world". It is difficult to accurately measure the revenue from artifacts, as they are primarily sold on the black market, but National Geographic estimates it may be in the tens of millions USD. As well as selling artifacts themselves, IS taxes traffickers smuggling them across IS's territory.

== Taxation and extortion ==
IS extracts wealth through taxation and extortion. Regarding taxation, Christians and foreigners are at times required to pay a tax known as jizya. The rate of jizya is determined by the income of the person, and it also serves as a protection contract involving harsh restrictions on non-Muslims. This tax has a historical foundation in the Quran and the original caliphate as a way to bring non-Muslims under the control of the spreading Empire.

The Islamic State has issued several taxes in an effort to control the assets acquired by its fighters in battle. According to the Quran, one-fifth of the ghanima, or the spoils of war taken by Islamic State's fighters, must be given to the state, and IS is believed to be collecting this tax, known as khums, in Mosul. All fighters for Islamic State also pay tax on property taken as spoils of war. As well as these spoils of war, property taken peacefully, known as fay', is subject to a 20 percent tax. These taxes serve the dual purpose of bringing in revenue for the state while maintaining strict control over its fighters.

While frowned upon, professions other than fighting jihad are necessary for the running of the state. Those who take up these professions must pay zakat, usually a 2.5% tax on an individual's total assets. Islamic State has also put in place the 'ushr tariff on imports and exports from their territory. All of these taxes imposed by Islamic State have some form of Quranic or historical basis except for the fay', giving the administration freedom of interpretation that could explain its higher rate.

In addition, the group routinely practices extortion, by demanding money from truck drivers and threatening to blow up businesses, for example. Robbing banks and gold shops has been another source of income. The Iraq government indirectly finances IS, as it continues to pay the salaries of the thousands of government employees who continue to work in areas controlled by IS, which then confiscates as much as half of those Iraqi government employees' pay. Policemen, teachers, and soldiers who had worked for religiously inappropriate regimes are reportedly allowed to continue work if they pay for a repentance ID card that has to be annually renewed.

== Illegal drug trade ==
Political scientist Colin P. Clarke of the RAND Corporation, writing after the end of the 2016–2017 Battle of Mosul in July 2017, stated that with IS's territorial losses causing declines in the organization's revenue from taxation of the local populations it once controlled, as well as from extortion from oil, gas, phosphate, and cement production, that the group would likely seek new revenue streams from drug trafficking.

== Agriculture ==
The acreage between Tigris and Euphrates has produced half of Syria's annual wheat crop and a third of Iraq's. It is able to produce crops worth possibly US$200 million per year if properly managed, and the UN Food and Agricultural Organization believes that 40% of Iraq's wheat-producing land is under IS control. It is believed that IS confiscates wheat and barley crops as zakat, as well as farming equipment that is then rented back to farmers. The organization maintains strict control over the production and distribution of crops, effectively setting prices.

== Donations from Arab states of the Persian Gulf ==
The State of Qatar has long been accused of acting as a conduit for the flow of funds to the Islamic State of Iraq and the Levant. While there is no proof that the Qatari government is behind the movement of funds from the gas-rich nation to IS, it has been criticized for not doing enough to stem the flow of financing. Private donors within Qatar, sympathetic to the aims of radical groups such as al-Nusra Front and IS, are believed to be channelling their resources to support these organisations. According to the U.S. Treasury Department, a number of terrorist financiers have been operating in Qatar. Qatari citizen Abd al Rahman al Nuaymi has served as an interlocutor between Qatari donors and leaders of al-Qaeda in Iraq (AQI). Nuaymi reportedly oversaw the transfer of US$2 million per month to AQI over a period of time. Nuaymi is also one of several of Qatar-based al-Qaeda financiers sanctioned by the U.S.Treasury in recent years. According to some reports, U.S. officials believe that the largest portion of private donations supporting IS and al-Qaeda-linked groups now comes from Qatar rather than Saudi Arabia.

In August 2014, a German minister Gerd Müller accused Qatar of having links to IS, stating "You have to ask who is arming, who is financing ISIS (IS) troops. The keyword there is Qatar". Qatari foreign minister Khalid bin Mohammad Al Attiyah stated: "Qatar does not support extremist groups, including [IS], in any way. We are repelled by their views, their violent methods and their ambitions."

Website The Daily Beast in June 2014 accused wealthy donors in Saudi Arabia and Qatar of having funded IS in the past. Iran and Iraqi Prime Minister Nouri al-Maliki have accused the governments of Saudi Arabia and Qatar of funding the group. Ahead of the pro-Iraq, anti-IS conference held in Paris on 15 September 2014, France's foreign minister acknowledged that a number of countries at the table had "very probably" financed IS's advances. According to The Atlantic, IS may have been a major part of Saudi Arabian Bandar bin Sultan's covert-ops strategy in Syria.

There are sources, however, that stress that there is no evidence that IS has direct support from the Saudi government, and that such support would contradict the Saudi state's other actions regarding the group. Saudi Arabia considers IS an enemy that has carried out attacks on their soil. They have worked openly with the United States in the arming other rebel groups the US hopes will fight IS and retake territory in Syria and Iraq. Saudi Arabia has also developed its own counter-propaganda efforts in response to IS's recruitment.

Unregistered charity organisations act as fronts to pass funds to IS; they disguise fundings for IS's operations as donations for "humanitarian charity". As they use aliases on Facebook's WhatsApp and Kik, the involved individuals and organisations are difficult to trace. Saudi Arabia therefore has imposed a blanket ban on unauthorised donations destined for Syria in order to stop such funding.

Julian Assange claimed in an interview that Hillary Clinton's Clinton Foundation and IS both receive funding from the same sources in the Middle East.
