= Battle of Hasakah (2022) =

Large scale Islamic State attack in the Syrian city of Hasakah

- Part of the Rojava–Islamist conflict of the Syrian civil war, and the American-led intervention in Syria
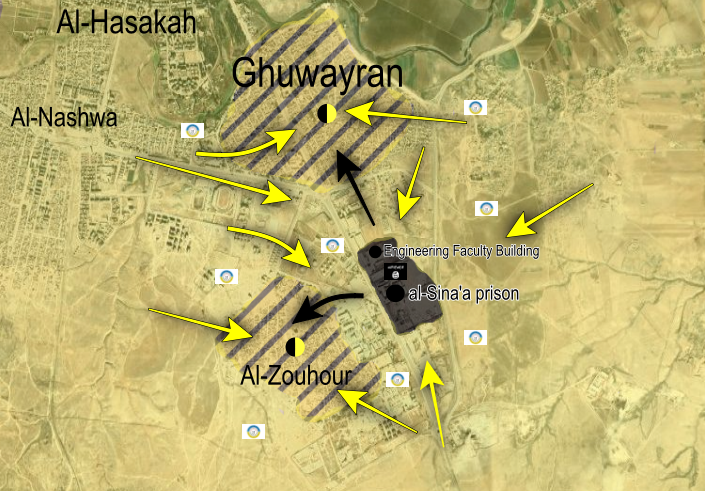
- The military situation following the attack on the prison (21 January 2022)
Date	20–30 January 2022 (1 week and 3 days)
Location	Hasakah, Syria 36°28′39″N 40°45′45″E
Result	SDF tactical victory, minor ISIL strategic victory: Destruction of Al-Sina'a Prison; At least 1,100 prisoners and fighters surrendered or arrested, while hundreds of prisoners escaped; Heavy casualties inflicted on IS; At least 2 IS Emirs escaped

Belligerents
Rojava: YPG; Asayish; SDF; CJTF–OIR: United States; United Kingdom	Islamic State

Commanders and leaders
Usman Mahmoud Uthman †	(Islamic State) Abu Abaida (surrendered)

Strength
9,000 SDF soldiers US and UK ground troops Coalition air forces	200–300+ fighters 2 suicide bombers ~3,500–4,000 prisoners

Casualties and losses
Per SOHR: 159 killed, 120 injured, 50 hostages taken Per SDF: 121 killed Per IS: 260 killed	Per SOHR: (Islamic State) 346 killed, 1,100 re-arrested Per SDF: (Islamic State) 374 killed, 3,600 re-arrested
- 4–7 civilians killed 40+ unidentified killed 45,000 civilians displaced
- Location within Syria

The Battle of Hasakah was a large-scale Islamic State attack and prison riot aimed at freeing arrested fighters of the Islamic State from al-Sina'a prison in the Ghuwayran (Geweran) area of Hasakah, Syria, which resulted in a SDF military victory and an ISIS prison break, with hundreds of prisoners, including important Emirs, being freed from captivity. The attack was the largest attack committed by the Islamic State since it lost its last key Syrian territory in 2019.

For over a week, IS and the Syrian Democratic Forces fought in Al Sina'a prison. 346 ISIS fighters were killed in the fighting, while the SDF took 154 fatalities while trying to regain control of the now-destroyed prison, with assistance of Coalition airstrikes. The SDF arrested over 1,100 prisoners (3,600, according to the SDF). A total of 400 prisoners were found missing in the fighting.

== Timeline ==
=== 20 January ===
The first wave of the attack occurred late at night on 20 January, when Islamic State forces launched a car bomb attack targeting the prison whilst IS ground fighters began to open fire on the prison with heavy weapons. Fires could be seen across the city coming from the direction of the prison.

The attack triggered a prison riot where the prisoners managed to obtain weaponry from the armoury and then began a full blown attack on the prison staff. The prison was subsequently occupied by armed prisoners and several prisoners managed to escape.

=== 21 January ===
Clashes continued into the next day. Islamic State fighters spread to the Al-Zouhour area of Hasakah city. The SDF worked quickly to respond, supported by the International Coalition aircraft which struck IS positions.

SDF forces tracked down and arrested 89 of the prisoners that had escaped the prison. The electricity to several parts of Hasakah city were cut off due to the clashes. During the clashes U.S fighter jets conducted 2 airstrikes on Islamic State held buildings in the city.

The SOHR reported that clashes continued between Islamic State and Kurdish forces over control of the prison and its surrounding areas.

During the evening and night of 21 January, Coalition jets fired flares above Hasakah whilst heavy clashes took place around the Ghuwayran prison and the neighbourhoods of Ghuwayran and Al-Zouhour. The Islamic State militants then reportedly took several SDF fighters hostage. Several civilians who refused to aid escaping ISIS fighters were massacred and their bodies desecrated in their homes in the surrounding neighbourhood.

=== 22 January ===
Fighting went on overnight and continued into the early hours of the morning with Coalition helicopters circling the areas above the fighting. A further 5 Kurdish fighters and 6 Islamic State fighters were killed in the overnight clashes. The SDF claimed they had managed to track down and arrest a further 41 escaped prisoners, bringing the total to 130, however it is still not known how many IS prisoners escaped from the detention facility, that housed up to 3,500 IS prisoners.

Throughout the day, violent clashes occurred in the areas around Ghuwayran prison, with Coalition forces launching airstrikes on IS-held positions and buildings. An American Apache attack helicopter was dispatched to the area and began to target a group of IS fighters that had set up positions in a nearby cemetery. A further 11 IS operatives were killed in the ensuing fighting and 6 more escaped prisoners were arrested.

SDF forces demanded via a loudspeaker that the besieged IS fighters surrender. The demand was refused.

Following further clashes in the day, another 5 IS militants, 6 Kurdish fighters and 2 more civilians were killed in the ongoing fighting. IS's Amaq News Agency released footage showing hostages inside the prison and the bodies of several killed prison staff. A report by the Iraqi Kurdish Esta Media Network stated that the SDF took multiple staging grounds of the initial riot in al-Sina'a prison. A press statement by the US Department of State commended the SDF for a "swift response" to the fighting in Hasakah.

=== 23 January ===
In the early hours of the morning, violent clashes took place in the vicinity of the prison and its surrounding areas, with the SDF trying to eliminate the IS operatives still fighting in nearby neighbourhoods. The clashes left 16 IS fighters and 5 Kurdish fighters dead.

Later in the day, Kurdish forces regained control of the prison's perimeter and managed to breach the prison, sparking several firefights inside the building between Kurdish soldiers and Islamic State fighters. There was continued fighting in the areas around the prison. 7 Islamic State militants and 6 Kurdish fighters were killed in the fighting.

SDF forces estimated that around 150–200 IS operatives were still actively fighting in the prison and surrounding areas and that they had yet to free any hostages. They announced a week-long curfew, affecting the entire city, to prevent IS cells from sending reinforcements.

=== 24 January ===
In the morning, Coalition aircraft resumed their attacks on IS positions in the prison, striking areas still occupied by armed IS prisoners. SDF forces later stormed the remaining parts of the prison still held by armed IS fighters who refused to surrender, freeing several hostages. Clashes continued in areas outside of the prison, where several IS fighters refused to surrender.

It was reported that dozens of IS fighters and prisoners had turned themselves in to Kurdish forces after holding up inside al-Sina'a prison.

Later in the day, negotiations between SDF forces and the IS Emir in charge of the armed prisoners took place regarding the status of the hostages taken by IS in the prison. The two sides agreed that some hostages would be released in exchange for the healing of injured IS fighters in a field clinic. Five IS fighters died of their wounds before they could receive treatment. It was reported that a group of foreign IS fighters were still refusing to surrender and were continuing to fight Kurdish forces in an area of the prison.

=== 25 January ===
Following the deal reached between IS and the SDF, 15 hostages were released by IS, leaving a remaining 27 hostages in captivity. The number of IS prisoners and fighters that had surrendered or been re-arrested had reached at least 600. Clashes resumed in the areas surrounding the prison during combing operations by Kurdish and Coalition forces, leaving another 7 IS fighters dead.

Later in the day, SDF and Coalition cleared an entire block of al-Sina'a prison from IS militants. Coalition armoured vehicles entered the prison's complex amid receiving fire from IS militants. The SDF evacuated another 50 IS prisoners from the area.

=== 26 January ===
Clashes continued to take place in the al-Zouhour and Ghuwayran neighbourhoods as Kurdish and Coalition forces launched a series of combing operations to root out remaining IS fighters. During these operations, 5 IS fighters and 4 SDF fighters were killed. A further 17 prisoners were freed from IS captivity in al-Sina'a prison.

=== 27 January ===
By 27 January, SDF and Coalition forces had retaken much of al-Sina'a prison and much of IS's forces had either surrendered or been killed. Clashes continued as 20–40 IS fighters refused to surrender and had entrenched themselves in the basement of one of the prison's cell blocks. During the storming of the prison, between the evening of 26 January and the morning of 27 January, 26 IS militants and 5 SDF fighters were killed.

Later in the day, another 17 IS fighters were killed in violent clashes with Kurdish forces in and around the vicinity of al-Sina'a prison.

=== 28 January ===
Clashes continued in the neighborhoods of Ghwayran and al-Zouhour between IS fighters and SDF forces. Clashes continued in certain areas of al-Sina'a prison where 'tens' of IS fighters still refused to surrender and were in the basement of the prison out of the reach of airstrikes. 18 SDF fighters and a further 7 IS militants were killed in the clashes.

Later in the day, during a combing operation in one of the nearby neighbourhoods, an SDF Special Forces fighter was shot dead by an IS gunman, who was himself killed after his hideout was blown up by SDF forces.

=== 29 January ===
A group of 3 IS suicide bombers took 4 civilians hostage, including the head of the neighbourhood, in the Kumin neighbourhood of Hasakah. The building they had occupied was quickly surrounded by SDF fighters. This happened after clashes renewed in the areas surrounding the prison. SDF fighters, under the supervision of American forces, later launched an operation to free the prisoners. Two of the IS bombers killed themselves and the third was shot dead by SDF forces. Six other IS fighters were arrested during raids.

Later in the day, 5 IS fighters were killed in clashes with SDF forces in the al-Sina'a prison. Shortly after, the IS Emir 'Abu Abaida' and a group of 20 other fighters surrendered to SDF forces at the al Sina'a prison.

=== 30–31 January ===
Clashes continued for another day. On 30 January, the SDF regained full control of the Al-Sina'a Prison and the surrounding neighborhoods, ending the 10-day-long battle. Another 4 SDF fighters were killed, while 3 more IS militants were arrested. Early on 31 January, the SDF announced that they had regained full control of the area.

Afterward, SDF forces swept the city and the neighboring towns for additional IS militants. The prison break attack had been the largest, deadliest battle involving IS in the region since early 2019, when they lost their last stronghold.

== See also ==
- Battle of Hasakah (2015)
- Battle of Hasakah (2016)
