= Aavesam =

1994 Telugu film by Kodi Ramakrishna

- DVD cover
- Directed by: Kodi Ramakrishna
- Written by: Dialogues: Paruchuri Brothers
- Produced by: N. Ramalingeswara Rao
- Starring: Rajasekhar; Nagma; Madhubala
- Cinematography: Sarath
- Edited by: Nageswara Rao
- Music by: M. M. Keeravani
- Production company: Ram Prasad Art Pictures
- Release date: 6 October 1994
- Country: India
- Language: Telugu

Aavesam is a 1994 Indian Telugu-language action drama film directed by Kodi Ramakrishna and produced by N. Ramalingeswara Rao under the Ram Prasad Art Pictures banner. The film stars Rajasekhar, Nagma, and Madhubala in lead roles, with music composed by M. M. Keeravani.

== Cast ==
- Rajasekhar
- Nagma
- Madhubala
- Rami Reddy
- Mukka Narasimha Rao
- Surendra Pal
- Chinna
- R. V. Prasad
- Achyuth
- Vedula Kameswara Rao
- Lalitha Kumari (Malli)
- Sandhya Sri

== Music ==
All music is composed by M. M. Keeravani.

Track list
No.	Title	Lyrics	Singer(s)	Length
1.	"Muddoyamma Muddu"	Veturi	S. P. Balasubrahmanyam, Chitra
2.	"Ammo Vana"	Veturi	S. P. Balasubrahmanyam, Chitra
3.	"Laaliche Talli"	Sirivennela Seetharama Sastry	S. P. Balasubrahmanyam
4.	"Lovvu Lovvu Lovvu"	Veturi	S. P. Balasubrahmanyam, Chitra
5.	"Ninnemadaganu"	Bhuvana Chandra	S. P. Balasubrahmanyam, Chitra

== Reception ==
Alluru Rahim of Zamin Ryot gave the film a positive review. He praised the plot's focus on exposing fraudulent gurus, the dialogues, and the debates between atheism and theism, but criticized the plot holes and music. K. Naresh Kumar, in Indian Cinema: Ebbs and Tides (1995), observed that recent southern films, including Aavesam, now tackle the topic of fraudulent godmen. He noted that the film graphically portrays recent shooting incidents at Puttaparthi, the abode of Sathya Sai Baba.
