= Sri Sathya Sai Central Trust =

Indian charitable trust

Sri Sathya Sai Central Trust (SSSCT)
- Motto: Love all, Serve all.
- Founder: Sri Sathya Sai Baba
- Established: 1972
- Mission: Free world-class health care facilities for the poor, holistic education, public welfare projects, spiritual transformation.
- Location: Puttaparthi, Sri Sathya Sai District, Andhra Pradesh, India
- Website: www.srisathyasai.org.in

The Sri Sathya Sai Central Trust (SSSCT), is a registered public charitable trust founded in 1972 by Sri Sathya Sai Baba. Its humanitarian work includes drinking water projects, healthcare and education.

Sri Sathya Sai Institute of Higher Medical Sciences (SSSIHMS) in Puttaparthi, inaugurated in November 1991 by the then prime minister of India, P. V. Narasimha Rao, is one of the famous hospitals set up by SSSCT.

In 2020, The Sathya Sai central trust granted Special Consultative status by United Nations Economic and Social Council. In November 2021, the SSSCT was confererred with the YSR Lifetime Achievement Award, by the Andhra Pradesh government for outstanding contribution to public service.

== History ==
Sri Sathya Sai Central Trust was founded on 2 September 1972, with Sathya Sai Baba as the sole trustee, for carrying out activities in the areas of providing relief to the poor, medical relief, and education. On 16 July 1975, the Trust was registered under Section 12A of the Income Tax Act, 1961.

In March 2010, the Trust was reconstituted to include apart from Baba, former Chief Justice of India PN Bhagawati, chartered accountant Indulal Shah, former Central Vigilance Commission Chief SV Giri, WS Industries Chairman V Srinivasan, and RJ Rathnakar. At that time, the Trust's council of management also had lawyer SS Naganand, former Canara Bank Chairman JV Shetty, former Indian Overseas Bank Chairman TKK Bhagawat, and K Chakravarthi (IAS retired).

After Sathya Sai Baba’s death in April 2011, the activities of the Trust were collectively managed by the then board of trustees. One of the trustees, RJ Rathnakar, the son of Sathya Sai Baba’s younger brother late RV Janakiramaiah, had been shouldering the responsibilities of implementing the decisions, as he stays in Puttaparthi.

In January 2020, RJ Rathnakar was unanimously appointed as Managing Trustee, by all the trustees. Bangalore Mirror notes that the new post was created to further expand the service activities.

As of August 2023, there are seven members on the Board of Trustees, including the Managing Trustee.

== Board of trustees ==
- T. K. K. Bhagawat
- K. Chakravarthi
- Vijay Kelkar
- V. Mohan
- Ryuko Hira
- S. S. Naganand
- R. J. Rathnakar

== Healthcare projects ==
The Trust is responsible for the establishment, functioning, and management of two super-specialty hospitals – Sri Sathya Sai Institute of Higher Medical Sciences, Prasanthigram, and Sri Sathya Sai Institute of Higher Medical Sciences, Whitefield, Bengaluru. They are also responsible for two general hospitals – the first one in Puttaparthi, built in 1954, and the second one in Whitefield, Bengaluru, built in 1976. Apart from that, in 2004, Sri Sathya Sai Mobile Hospital was launched to provide comprehensive health care at doorstep to residents of neighboring villages.

The healthcare services offered by the Trust are in keeping with the principles laid down by Sathya Sai Baba:

- Healthcare should be available to all, irrespective of caste, religion, nationality, or financial status.
- Healthcare should be decommercialized and it should be delivered free of charge.
- Healthcare should be driven by human values and services should be administered with love.
- Healthcare should be combined with spiritualism and the goal should be to heal the patient in body, mind, and spirit, not merely to cure disease.

Besides employees, volunteers across various disciplines spend time regularly with the aim of contributing service to society.

It is hoped that the healthcare projects initiated by the Trust may serve as a model for other individuals and organizations to create similar hospitals in the service of mankind.

=== Sri Sathya Sai Institute of Higher Medical Sciences, Prasanthigram ===
On 22 November 1991, a day before the 65th birthday of Sathya Sai Baba, P. V. Narasimha Rao, the then Prime Minister of India had flown down to Puttaparthi and inaugurated the 220-bed super-specialty hospital. It was built in 10 months, at a cost of Rs 300 crores with the aim of providing free medical care to the sick and ailing with dedication, commitment, love, and the best of skills, so that they will be cured in body, mind and spirit.

The specialties offered include cardiology, ophthalmology, urology, gastroenterology, CTVS and orthopedics. Former head of AIIMS, Dr. Amarnath Safaya was appointed as the first director of the hospital.

==== Cardiology and cardiothoracic surgery ====
A report published in World Health Forum, 1998, says that in the first five-year period from November 1991 to November 1996, a total of 5,345 heart operations were performed, 3052 of which were for open heart surgery (correction of congenital anomalies in children, valvular repairs, coronary artery surgery, removal of heart tumors, etc.). Some 4,572 procedures were carried out in the cardiac catheterization laboratory, of which 733 were percutaneous transluminal coronary angioplasties, mitral or pulmonary valvuloplasties, and permanent pacemaker implantations. A total of 159,361 outpatients were examined and treated, while over 8,860 were admitted as inpatients for an average stay of 12 days. Those who had operations included 1,509 students, 744 children, and 1,055 housewives. Mortality and infection rates were reported to be below 2%, comparable to the world average of the best centres of cardiac surgery in the world.

==== Uro-nephrology and ophthalmology ====
In the early four years (1992-1996), a total of 47,396 outpatients were examined and investigated in the uro-nephrology department. Over 5,652 surgical operations were performed, 4,286 kidney dialyses, and 71 kidney transplants.

The ophthalmology department provides total eye care including vitreoretinal surgery, laser treatment, photo-coagulation, and cryosurgery. A sophisticated eye bank was set up to serve the many cases of corneal blindness. In the two years since 1994, 28,245 outpatients had been examined, investigated, and treated; 2,525 operations were carried out for eye trauma, corneal transplantation, and vitreous and retinal diseases.

==== The Department of Plastic Surgery ====
The Department of Plastic Surgery began functioning at the SSSIHMS, Prasanthigram, in July 1997. The first operation was conducted on September 15, 1997.

==== Covid-19 treatment centre ====
During the Covid-19 pandemic in 2020, around 420 hospital staff were involved in providing care at the hospital's Covid-19 treatment center including 53 doctors, 142 nurses, and 225 other paramedical and support staff.

The Trust donated or spent a total of US$2 Million, including donations to the state and central government relief funds, medical supplies to 14 quarantine centres in the district, and to convert a facility into 125-bed COVID hospital with five ICU beds with ventilators. The Trust's Central Research and Instrumentation Facility developed a rapid Covid-19 detection kit (SAIC-19 Ag Kit), which was validated and approved for use by the Indian Council of Medical Research. The Trust collaborated with UNICEF in creating public awareness programmes on Covid-19 infection.

==== Recognition ====
The SSSIHMS, Prasanthigram was conferred National Accreditation Board for Hospitals & Healthcare Providers (NABH) accreditation on 11 July 2016 for quality patient care.

In June 2023, SSSIHMS, Prasanthigram received an award of recognition from the Andhra Pradesh Government for their clean and green initiatives including energy conservation within the campus, a sewage treatment plant of 500 KLD capacity, solar power generation of 1.9 MW capacity, check dams for water conservation, tree plantation, biomedical waste segregation with proper colour coding for ease of disposal, and energy-efficient lighting.

==== Architecture ====
Constructed by Larsen & Toubro, the hospital was designed by Keith Critchlow, a British artist, lecturer, author, sacred geometer, professor of architecture and a co-founder of the Temenos Academy in the UK. Isaac Tigrett, who had founded the Hard Rock Cafe enterprise, had sought Critchlow's expertise, and his use of sacred geometry played a major role in the architectural design of the hospital.

=== The Sathya Sai Institute of Higher Medical Sciences, Whitefield ===
Replicating the success of the super-specialty hospital in Prasanthi Nilayam, Sathya Sai Baba announced a similar project for Bengaluru. On 19 January 2001, the then Prime Minister Atal Bihari Vajpayee inaugurated the 330-bed hospital in Whitefield, Bengaluru. An article in INSEAD Knowledge, notes that the hospital is set in a sprawling 52-acre complex with a placid and contemplative atmosphere, and patients are greeted by volunteers who come to the hospital in the spirit of selfless service, one of the central values extolled by Sri Sathya Sai Baba. The same article mentions that as of March 2015, 46,535 cardiology procedures and 20,720 neurology procedures had been performed at the Bangalore facility, with a mortality rate (0.87%) - that is lower than the average for a hospital in the developed world.

Doctors, as well as skilled workers for non-clinical positions volunteer their services. In 2016, new equipment was added and various departments of the SSSIHM in both Prasanthigram and Whitefield were upgraded at the cost of Rs.100 crores.

=== Sri Sathya Sai General Hospital, Prasanthi Nilayam ===
Much before the Trust was founded, Sathya Sai Baba had a general hospital constructed in Prasanthi Nilayam in the mid-1950s. Since Puttaparthi was a remote village, there were no basic healthcare facilities to address even the primary healthcare needs of villagers and pregnant women. Baba laid the foundation stone for Sri Sathya Sai General Hospital on his birthday on 23 November 1954. It was inaugurated on 4 October 1956. Baba also launched a ‘healthcare on wheels’ programme under the general hospital in Puttaparthi. A ‘medical van’ took doctors and nurses regularly to villages offering curative services and health education.

Later, under the aegis of the Trust, the hospital was expanded in the 80s and the 90s to include operation theatres, labor wards, and post-natal wards. Primary healthcare, emergencies, normal deliveries, Caesarian sections, dental problems, and general surgeries are handled in the hospital.

=== Sri Sathya Sai General Hospital, Whitefield ===
The general hospital in Whitefield was set up in 1976, when Whitefield was a remote village out of Bangalore city limits. It serves the poor from over 500 villages around Whitefield, and even districts of neighbouring states.

Over the years, the hospital has expanded into a 35,000-sqft building over four acres of land, and has state-of-the-art medical facilities and equipments. All cases from gynaecology and general surgery to psychiatry are taken up. It has a dispensary that gives medicines to the patients treated here free.

As of May 2001, the hospital had treated over 2 million cases free, including knee and hip replacement surgeries, cornea grafts, plastic surgery to set right clefts, and removal of kidney stones.

=== Sri Sathya Sai Mobile Hospital, Prasanthi Nilayam ===
Sri Sathya Sai Mobile Hospital is a healthcare on wheels program offering advanced medical care at the doorstep for patients living in remote villages. Other than surgeries that require general anesthesia, all medical services are offered on a monthly basis.

In 2005, Sathya Sai Baba commissioned Siemens India to custom build a bus with a high-power supply generator on board, and the Mobile Hospital service was launched in Puttaparthi in 2006. The bus is equipped with an ultrasound with color Doppler, 2D echocardiogram, digital X-ray, biochemistry, and clinical pathology labs along with a pharmacy that dispenses a month’s supply of medicines to last until the next month’s visit.

The Mobile Hospital at Prasanthi Nilayam serves Bukkapatnam, Chennekothapalli, Nallamada, Obuladevaraj Cheruvu, and Puttaparthi Mandals.

Every month, for twelve days, the mobile clinic with its team of doctors visits one village every day. Villages up to a radius of 50 kilometers around Puttaparthi are covered. Patients from 30 to 50 villages converge at a nodal point on the scheduled dates. Volunteers prep the selected site – the rooms temporarily allocated to them in the school building of the village. They set up overnight a makeshift hospital that comprises the bus, classrooms, and tents. While tents and verandahs serve as waiting areas, classrooms serve as consultation rooms. Instant diagnostics are carried out in the labs on the bus. The whole activity is powered by the onboard generator.

The hospital is staffed by a team of 500 volunteer doctors ranging from professors to junior physicians and including private practitioners. Services are offered in General Medicine, ENT, Ophthalmology, Dental medicine, Obstetrics and Gynaecology, Orthopedics, Pediatrics, Geriatrics and Dermatology. By 2017, the Mobile Hospital had treated 873,367 patients, performed 56,786 diagnostic procedures, 209,263 biochemical tests, 21,355 X-rays, 25,823 ultrasounds and 9,608 ECGs

All services are delivered free of cost. For complicated cases, doctors take responsibility for arranging for further treatment in the super-specialty hospital in Puttaparthi.

The successful model was replicated by Sathya Sai devotees in other states in India and also in Sri Lanka, Indonesia, Africa, and South America.

==== Recognition ====
In 2013, the mobile hospital was awarded the "Commendation for Innovation in Transforming Lives" award by CNBC-TV18.

== Water Projects ==
Among the public welfare activities undertaken by Sri Sathya Sai Central Trust is the provision of drinking water to 1051 villages in the drought-prone districts of Anantapur, Medak, and Mahboobnagar, 452 upland and tribal habitations in East Godavari and West Godavari districts, and the Sathya Sai Ganga project for providing drinking water to residents of Chennai alongside helping irrigate three lakh acres of land in Nellore and Chittoor districts, and water pruification systems.

=== Anantapur Drinking Water Supply Project ===
A drought-prone district in the state of Andhra Pradesh, Anantapur receives the second lowest rainfall in the country after Jaisalmer in Rajasthan. The three major rivers Pennar, Hagari, and Chitravathi that flow in the district remain dry during the summer months. Groundwater is not only scarce but also high in fluoride content, causing physical deformities and ailments among people living in the region. People had to walk long distances to fetch water for their daily needs, resulting in joint pains.

Sathya Baba announced in 1994 that the Trust would fund a project for the supply of drinking water to villages in Anantapur district. Prime Minister P.V. Narasimha Rao inaugurated the Rs.300 crore project on November 18, 1995. The project was formally handed over to the Government of Andhra Pradesh in October 1997.

A private firm, Larsen & Toubro was contracted for project management and construction. The community gave access to private property and workmen around the clock.

The project involved laying of 2000 kilometres of pipeline of varying diameters. 43 sumps with capacities ranging from 100,000 liters to 2,500,000 liters were constructed. 18 balancing reservoirs with capacities ranging from 300,000 liters to 1,000,000 lakh liters were constructed on the top of hillocks. 270 overhead reservoirs and 125 ground-level reservoirs were set up. More than 1500 precast concrete cisterns of 2500 liters capacity were installed in various villages. Each cistern has four taps for people to collect water.

Overall, 731 villages are provided free water under this project that has received much acclaim from the Government of India:

- The Ninth Five Year Plan document of the Government of India added a citation to the Trust in appreciation of the project, which read - "Sri Sathya Sai Trust has set an unparalleled example of private initiative in implementing a project on their own, without any state's budgetary support, a massive water supply project, with an expenditure of Rs. 3,000 million to benefit 731 scarcity and fluoride/salinity-affected villages and a few towns in Anantapur district of Andhra Pradesh in a time frame of about 18 months.”
- On 23 November 1999, the Department of Posts, Government of India, released a postage stamp and a postal cover in recognition of the pioneering service rendered by Sathya Sai Baba in addressing the problem of providing safe drinking water to the rural masses.
- Presenting the Sathya Sai Water Project at the third World Water Forum at Osaka, a spokesman described it as not just a case study, but a story that was also a love story.
- At the fourth World Water Forum in Mexico, the Project was adjudged as one of the ten best local action programmes in the world contributing to the Millennium Development Goals set by the United Nations.

=== Medak and Mahabubnagar ===
Following the success of the Anantapur Drinking Water Supply Project, the Trust undertook similar projects to provide safe and clean drinking water to people in the drought-prone and fluoride-affected villages of Medak and Mahabubnagar districts of Telangana state (then Andhra Pradesh). Apart from excessive fluorine, the groundwater in these regions is polluted by industrial waste. About 320 villages are beneficiaries of the projects.

=== East Godavari and West Godavari ===
Tribes and poor people living in the upland and backward areas of the East Godavari and West Godavari districts of Andhra Pradesh were getting their water from bore wells and streams. Sourcing water from the perennial Godavari river and its tributary Pamuleru, the Sri Sathya Sai Central Trust took up projects to provide safe drinking water to about 220,000 people across 212 habitations in East Godavari, and 470,000 people across 240 habitations in West Godavari districts. The projects in both the districts were completed and handed over to the Government of Andhra Pradesh on 15, September 2007.

=== Sathya Sai Ganga Canal ===
Chennai (then known as Madras), the capital of Tamil Nadu, is a bustling metropolitan city with a population of about 11.9 million. Dubbed “Detroit of Asia”, Chennai is a hub for industries in the area of automobiles, BPO, software, data centers, manufacturing, medical tourism, and fintech.

There was one problem. Until December 2004, Chennai had a severe water shortage, with people queuing up at taps for water. Since Chennai lies in the rain shadow region of the southwest monsoon, it has to depend on the fickle northeast monsoon for its water supply. No major rivers flow near the city. Thus, Chennai has had to live with the problem of water shortage from way back in the late nineteenth century. In the years preceding 2004, some areas of the city had to go without water supply for three days at a time during summer months. The city required about 750 million liters of water per day but had a supply of just 250 million liters.

As part of the Telugu Ganga Project in the early 1960s for solving the Chennai water problem, the Central Government had announced that annually 15 TMC (thousand million cubic feet) of water from the perennial Krishna river would be brought to Madras, with the states of Andhra Pradesh, Karnataka, and Maharashtra contributing 5 TMC each from their share of Krishna water.

Through a 150-kilometer-long canal, the water from the Somasila reservoir in the Srisailam district was to be taken to the Kandaleru reservoir in the Nellore district, and from there to the Poondi reservoir in Tamil Nadu that supplies Chennai city. The Kandaleru-Poondi canal connecting Kandaleru and Poondi reservoirs was called the Telugu Ganga and was completed in 1996.

However, out of the planned 15 TMC of water, only a measly 0.5 TMC of water reached the Poondi reservoir. The rest of the water was lost due to evaporation, seepage, and erosion of the canal walls. A few years later, the canal was left dilapidated. To the despairing millions of Chennai, it seemed there was no solution in sight to their problem.

On 19 January 2002, Sathya Sai Baba announced that he was determined to resolve the water problem of Chennai. The Chennai water project undertaken by Sri Sathya Sai Central Trust commenced in July 2002. This would ensure adequate water supply to Chennai and also help irrigate about 3 lakh (0.3 million) acres of agricultural land in the Nellore and Chittoor districts of Andhra Pradesh.

As part of the project, the dilapidated Kandaleru-Poondi canal was renovated and the capacity of the Kandaleru reservoir was enhanced. Sixty-five kilometers of the 150-km Kandaleru-Poondi canal were lined and three escape structures were built to divert water in case of flooding.

The project progressed at a fast pace using modern technology. About 4000 workers were employed, and work proceeded round-the-clock. In February 2003, the work had to be halted for a month upon request from the then chief minister of Pradesh Andhra N Chandrababu Naidu to enable the government to let water into the canal to tide over the drinking water crisis in Tirupati. The project was completed in a record time of sixteen months.

Now it was only a matter of the reservoir at Kandaleru filling up before the water could begin its historic journey to Chennai. Finally, on 23 November 2004, the 79th birthday of Baba, the gates of the Kandaleru reservoir were opened. The gurgling waters surged 150 kilometers and reached the Andhra Pradesh-Tamil Nadu border in a record four days as against the 8–10 days it used to take prior to the project.

On 27 November 2004, the Poondi reservoir began to fill up with Sai Ganga water, and Chennai residents finally found succor. A few days after the release of water, on the 11th of December, devotees from Chennai gathered at Prasanthi Nilayam to express their gratitude to Baba.

The Andhra Pradesh Government, in appreciation and gratitude to Baba, rechristened the Kandaleru-Poondi canal from Telugu Ganga to “Sathya Sai Ganga”.

=== Janmabhoomi Project in Chittoor ===
A Rs. 30-crore project was taken up under the Janmabhoomi scheme by the then Andhra Pradesh government to improve drinking water supply to 1,000 villages in Chittoor district. The Sathya Sai Central Trust contributed 36 percent of the cost and the Andhra Pradesh government contributed 64 percent.

=== The Sri Sathya Sai National Drinking Water Mission ===
The Mission was set up to provide drinking water supply and address water purification needs in various states. As per the government estimates, about 177 districts in 21 States were prone to excessive fluoride content in the drinking water sources, impacting more than 6.2 crore people. In response to this problem, the Sri Sathya Sai Seva Organizations, a division of the Central Trust, undertook the installation of water purification systems, funded by the Central Trust. By 2020, they completed installation of 108 water purification systems in villages spreading over six states with an investment of ₹5.4 crore. These plants can remove nitrate, arsenic and other heavy metals from water.

In Paderu, Visakhapatnam District of Andhra Pradesh, the Mission has provided drinking water to 350 villages across 10 Mandals, which account for a population of 4,40,585. This project involved laying of pipelines through hilly terrains and provision of storage facilities, to solve the problem of people having to trudge through difficult terrain to collect water, while risking snake and scorpion bites.

The Sathya Sai Premadhara Project initiated by Sathya Sai Seva Organisationa, Kerala in 2018-2019 has installed 119 water filtration units, providing pure drinking water every day to about 1,65,000 citizens in 14 districts.

== Educare ==
The Central Trust runs free residential and non-residential educational institutions in Puttaparthi, Anantapur, Muddenahalli, and Bengaluru. The aim is to inculcate excellence in academics with an emphasis on human values and ethics. The environment is designed to be conducive to the development of universal human values. Through curricular, co-curricular and extra-curricular activities, these schools foster in students a sense of self-discipline, a spirit of self-sacrifice and a commitment to offer selfless service to the community. Students regularly spend time in offering community service in the surrounding villages. CBSE syllabus is followed in the primary and secondary schools.

=== Schools Run By the Central Trust ===
- Smt. Eashwaramma English Medium School, Puttaparthi - A non-residential school for boys and girls, it was founded in 1972 as a Telugu medium school, and named after Baba’s mother, Easwaramma. The school was converted into a modern CBSE syllabus English Medium School in 2010. The first batch started on 10 June 2010. This school is meant exclusively for the children of Puttaparthi and surrounding villages
- Sri Sathya Sai Higher Secondary School, Puttaparthi - This is a fully residential English medium school for boys and girls, offering education from Class I to XII.
- Sri Sathya Sai Institute of Higher Learning - This is a fully residential institute with four campuses - three for men at Puttaparthi, Whitefield-Bengaluru, Muddenahalli, and one for women at Anantapur. Founded in 1981, Sri Sathya Sai Institute of Higher Learning is an autonomous body, recognized by the Ministry of Education, Government of India. It offers both free undergraduate and graduate level programs. The environment in the university is similar to the ancient Indian ‘gurukula’ system of education, in a modern context. As in all Sathya Sai educational institutions, it offers values-based integral education where equal importance is given to both academics and the development of character. The Puttaparthi campus also houses a Central Research Instruments Facility (CRIF), a high-quality research facility with major equipment and infrastructural resources required for the University faculty, doctoral research scholars and postgraduate students to gain high-quality training for pursuing directed research in frontier areas. The Sri Sathya Sai Institute Of Higher Learning, Prashanthi Nilayam, is the only college in India to have received an "A++" rating by the National Assessment And Accreditation Council (NAAC), an autonomous body established by the University Grants Commission. The NAAC ranked SSSIHL amongst the top ten universities in India. The University achieved A++ accreditation in 2003, A in 2011 and B++ as per the latest assessment in 2021. The university is totally nonprofit and provides free education for all students.
- Sri Sathya Sai Mirpuri College Of Music, Puttaparthi - Founded in the year 2000, the college offers Foundation, Diploma, Bachelors and Masters programs in various disciplines of music. In 2017, the music college was reduced to a mere department of the Sathya Sai Institute of Higher Learning and the college building was offered to the Government to house the District Collector's Office.

=== Sri Sathya Sai Schools in Other States in India ===
The Central Trust supports schools run in various cities across various states in India run by the respective Sri Sathya Sai State Trusts. There are Sathya Sai schools in Vishakhapatnam, Indore, Hyderabad, Golaghat, Mumbai, Dakshin Kannada, Ongole, Chiralla, and Cumbum, Nandigama Mandal, and other places.

=== Sri Sathya Sai Vidya Vahini ===
The SSS Vidya Vahini was announced on Baba's birthday in 2010, and formally launched in November, 2011, at Baba's Mahasamadhi in Sai Kulwanth Hall, Puttaparthi by Tata Group chairperson Ratan Tata. Aimed at teacher empowerment, more specifically in rural education, SSS Vidya Vahini is an edtech platform that supports teachers across India by providing them free access to technology, high-quality academic content, training and teaching aids. Content and lesson plans are based on the syllabus, following the latest methods in pedagogy and integrating them with human values.

In November 2023, on the occasion of the Sri Sathya Sai Vidya Vahini (SSSVV) programme completing a decade, the Sri Sathya Sai Central Trust signed a memorandum of understanding with the NCERT-CIET to share its expertise with all government school teachers in the country.

== See also ==
- Puttaparthi
- Sathya Sai Baba
- Prasanthi Nilayam
- Sri Sathya Sai Institute of Higher Learning
- Sri Sathya Sai University
- Sri Sathya Sai International Organization (SSSIO)
