= 1993 murders in Prasanthi Nilayam =

Attempted assassination on Sathya Sai Baba

On June 6, 1993 there was an assassination attempt on Sathya Sai Baba's life. While reports vary, the official narrative is that four men (devotees) entered Sai Baba's residence under the premise of wanting to give him a telegram. When their path was obstructed, they stabbed two of the Baba's assistants to death, injuring two others. Hearing the commotion Sai Baba sounded the alarm and police were dispatched to his residence. Upon arriving, the police said the four youths had locked themselves in Sai Baba's living room and the officers tried to break the door down. "The four were shot when they opened the door and attacked the police." Sai Baba remained unharmed during the incident, and later in a discourse cleared things up saying there was no bid on his life.

Many aspects of the event remain ambiguous and unresolved. Inspector Reddy (of the Puttaparthi recalls thinking Swami (Sai Baba) was dead and telling his officers to shoot but could never explain the big time gap between the four men locking themselves in the living room and their shooting. Some say that influential persons in the ashram ordered their deaths. Janakiram, Sai Baba's brother, told India Today, "If we allowed them (the assailants) to live, some Ram Jethmalani-like lawyer would have come and rescued them."

Two of the initial assailants escaped and were captured a month later. They told investigators "that they had no intention of killing Baba but to inform him about some trust members who wanted to usurp his powers." Anantpur Superintendent of Police K. Subbanna, said: "It is obvious that this is a conspiracy with a very big dimension."

Another concern for Sai Baba's immediate safety arose on January 17, 2002 when an unknown man (later identified as Somasundaram) entered the Whitefield Ashram with an air pistol. He was apprehended by volunteers and handed over to police without incident.

Mr. Indulal Shah, chief functionary of the Sri Sathya Sai Central Trust was quoted in the press as stating "the matter is purely internal and we do not wish to have any law enforcement agency investigating into it." However, it is currently unknown whether the murdered men were targets or assailants.

== Intruder incident analysis ==
The incident was widely published in the Indian press. In the BBC documentary it was stated that "some police officers were arrested but were never charged and that the case was eventually dropped." The police version claimed that the assailants charged at the police with daggers and were all shot dead. A Central Bureau of Investigation report stated that the official police report was riddled with lies and inconsistencies. V.P.B. Nair (Former Secretary to the Home Minister of Andhra Pradesh) also opined that the official police report contained inconsistencies.
