= Javalakar Uma Devi =

Indian judge

Hon'ble Ms. Justice Javalakar Uma Devi

Judge of Andhra Pradesh High Court
- Incumbent
- Assumed office 17 January 2017
- Nominated by: Jagdish Singh Khehar
- Appointed by: Pranab Mukherjee

Personal details
- Born: 26 September 1959 (age 67) Anantapur, Andhra Pradesh
- Education: Sri Krishnadevaraya University

Javalakar Uma Devi (born 26 September 1959) is a judge of the Andhra Pradesh High Court, in India. She gained public attention in 2020 after ordering India's federal investigative agency, the Central Bureau of Investigation (CBI), to probe social media posts that criticized judges of the Andhra Pradesh High Court, and also accused the Andhra Pradesh police of collaborating with political figures to attack the judiciary.

== Life ==
Uma Devi was born in 1959, in Anantapur, Andhra Pradesh, to Javalakar Gnanoba Rao and Javalakar Thulasibai. She earned a Bachelor in Commerce from the Sri Satya Sai Institute of Higher Learning in Anantapur in 1982, and a Bachelor in Law from Sri Krishnadevaraya University, Anantapur in 1986. She also earned a Masters in Law from Annamalai University in Chennai.

== Career ==
Uma Devi enrolled with the Bar Council of Andhra Pradesh in 1986 and initially practiced in district courts in Anantapur. She was appointed as a District Judge in 1996, and has served as the principal district judge in several places, including Kurnool, Madanapalle, Warangal, Visakhapatnam, and Hyderabad. She was later appointed the Chief Judge of the Court of Small Causes in Hyderabad.

On 17 January 2017, she was appointed a judge in the High Court of Andhra Pradesh.

In October 2020, following criticism of the Andhra Pradesh judiciary by members of the YSR Congress Party on social media, Uma Devi and another judge, Rakesh Kumar, directed India's federal investigative agency, the CBI, to examine these social media posts to determine if there was a 'conspiracy' behind them, and submit a report to them in two months. Uma Devi and Kumar also authorised the CBI to file a First Information Report, i.e. a police document that begins the criminal process, against persons making these social media posts, at its discretion. Uma Devi and Kumar described these criticisms as "perilous to democracy." The order was widely reported.
