= Prasanthi Nilayam =

Ashram in Puttaparthi, India

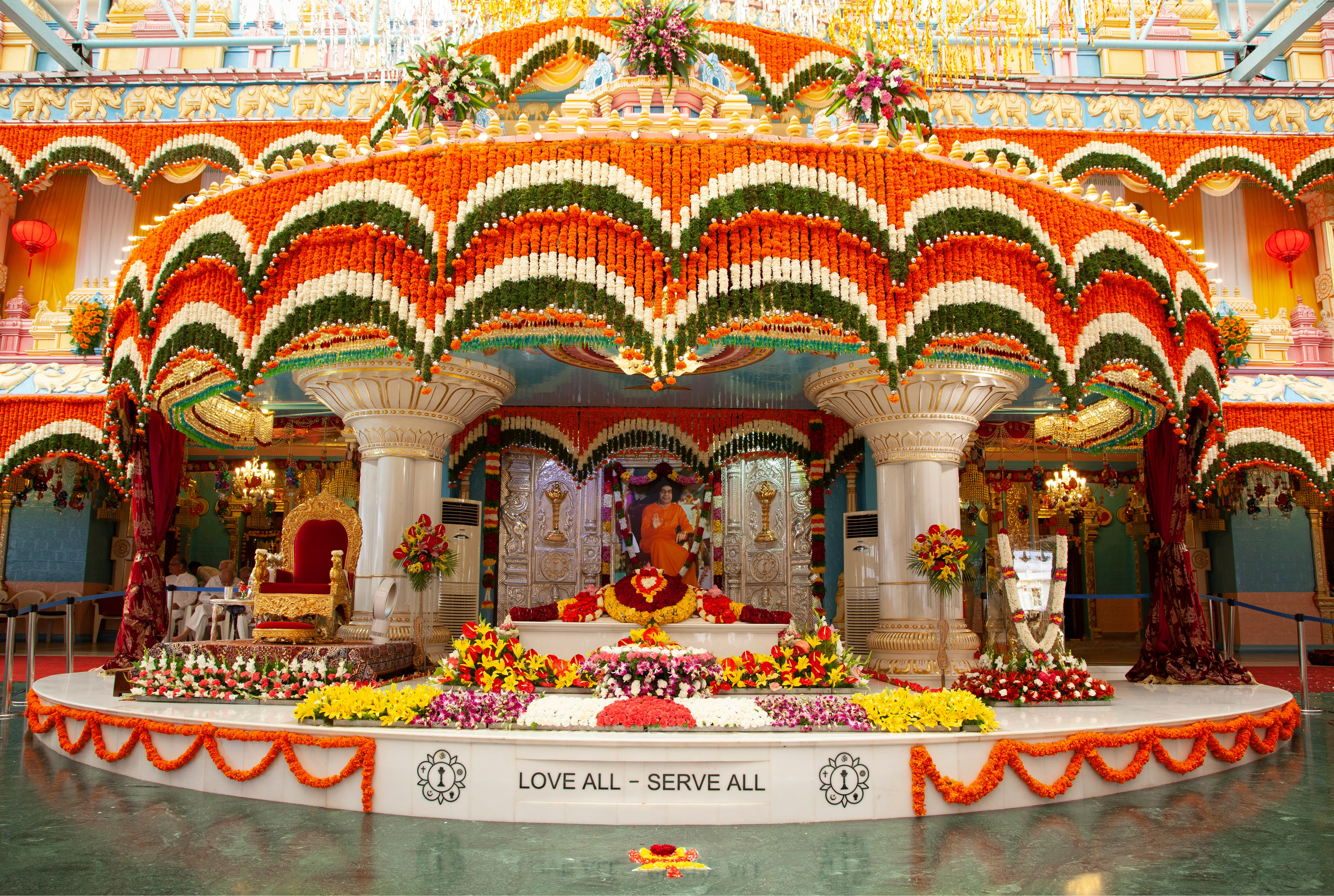
Sri Sathya Sai Baba Samadhi Mandir at Prasanthi Nilayam

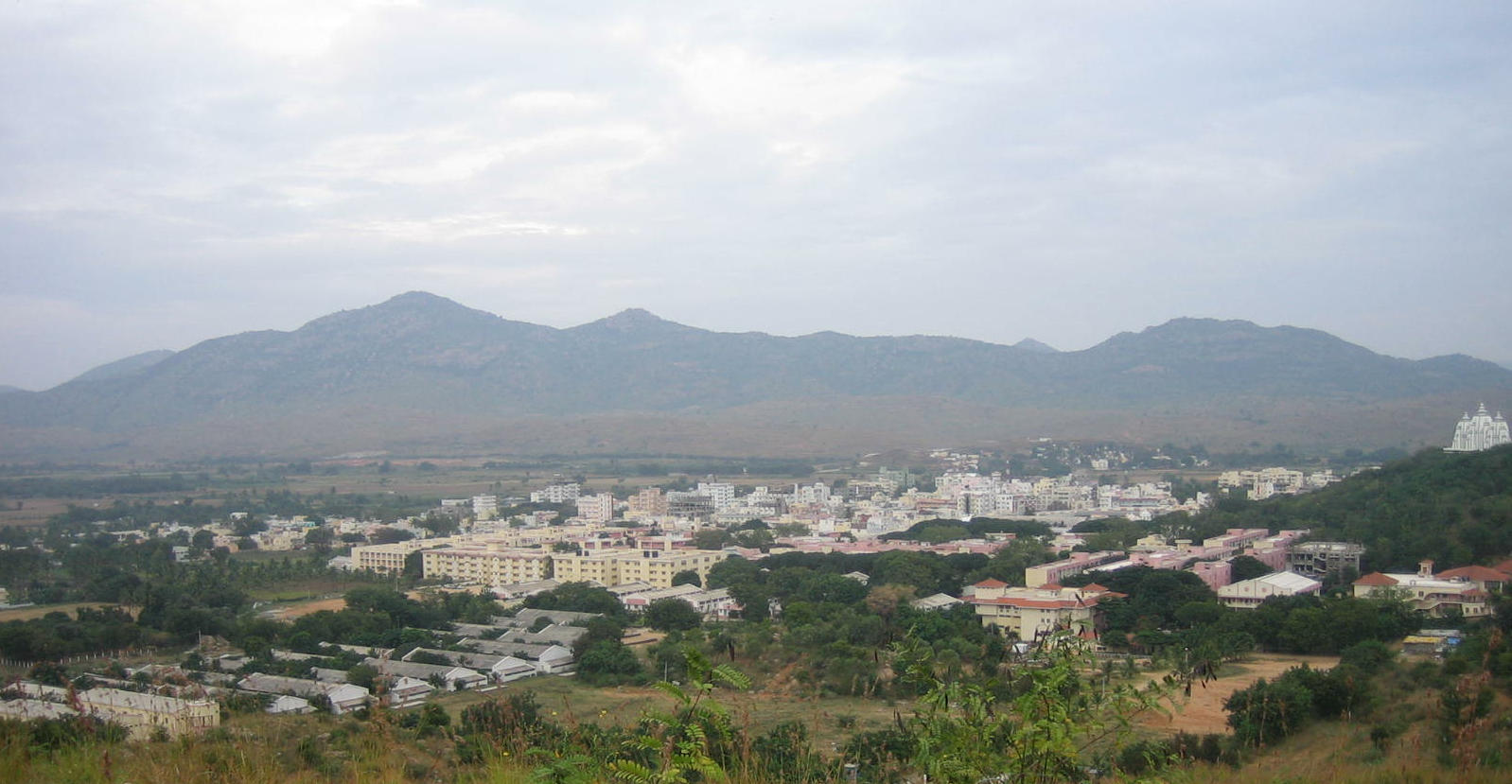
Prasanthi Nilayam, Puttaparthi, A.P.

Prasanthi Nilayam (14°9.91′N 77°48.70′E, 800 meters (2,600 feet) above sea level) is the main ashram and Samadhi Mandir of Sathya Sai Baba located in the town of Puttaparthi in, Sri Sathya Sai district Andhra Pradesh, India. Sathya Sai Baba was born in Puttaparthi. "Prasanthi Nilayam" means literally "Abode of the Highest Peace." Sathya Sai Baba gave daily darshan to his devotees in this ashram. Sathya Sai Baba was usually present in Prasanthi Nilayam from early June to the middle of March.

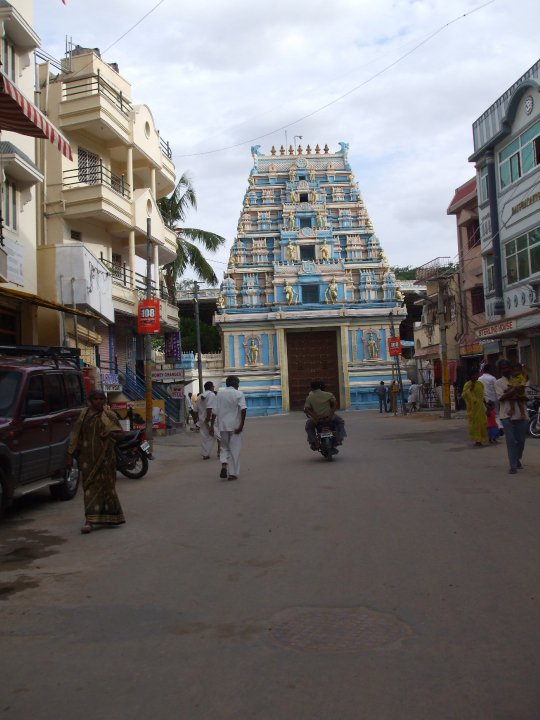
Main entrance to Prasanthi Nilayam

== History ==
At the age of 17, Sathya Sai Baba told one devotee, "The Sai Pravesh (the advent of Sai) will transform that region into Prasanti Pradesh (a region of highest peace). There will rise a bhavan (mansion)! Lakhs of people from all over India, why only India, from all over the world, will come and wait there for Sai darshan!"

In 1944, a small temple was built to facilitate Sai Baba's growing number of followers. It is now commonly referred to as the "old mandir." Construction of the main Prasanti Nilayam ashram began soon after, and it was inaugurated on 23 November 1950, which was also the 24th birthday of Sai Baba.

"Sathya Sai Baba can be said to be the architect and engineer who directed the entire work for construction", says Narayana Kasturi. Sathya Sai Baba supervised the construction, acquiring of equipment, and watched over the devotees who constructed the ashram." Heavy girders for the central prayer hall was transported from Tiruchirappalli by train to Penukonda and then had to be brought over the district road, sixteen miles long."

The mandir was painted blue, yellow, and pink, symbolizing the harmony of spirit (blue), intellect (yellow), and heart (love), which together represent the path to supreme peace, or prasanti. In October 1957, a hospital was inaugurated on the hill behind the ashram."

Poornachandra Auditorium was built in 1973 where cultural programmes, conferences and yagnas during Dasara take place." It can seat around 15,000 people in the 60 x 40-metre area. Sathya Sai Baba's living quarters are upstairs above the stage."

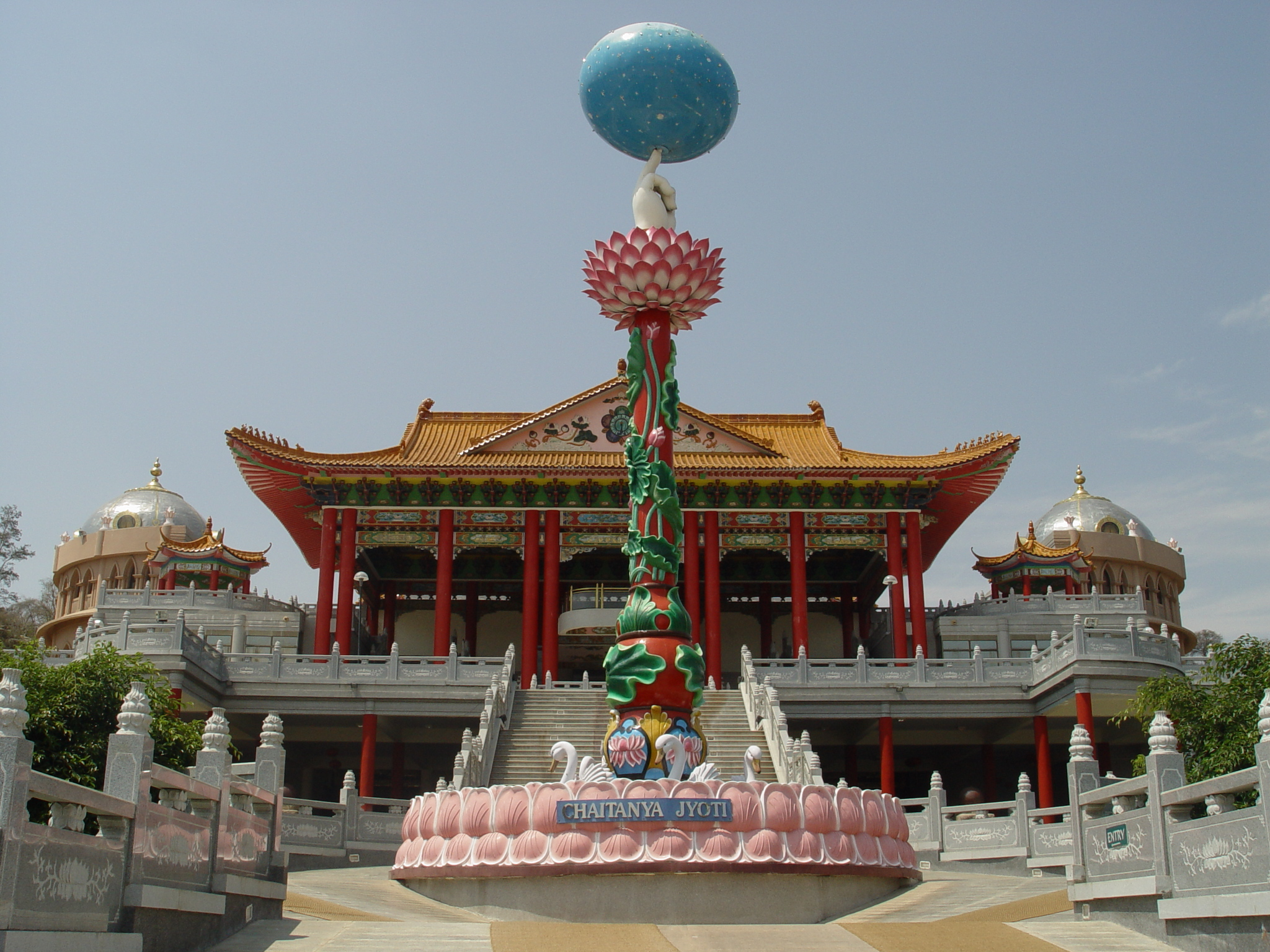
Chaitanya Jyoti, a world-religions museum

The Sarva Dharma Stupa, a 50 foot high pillar celebrating the unity of all religions, was built in November 1975 to mark the advent of the Avatar." Sai Kulwant Hall with a seating capacity of about 20,000 is where daily darshan took place. Sai Kulwant Hall is between Sathya Sai Baba's residence (Yajur Mandir) and the Prasanti Mandir. The carved icons of Rama, Sita, Lakshmana, and Hanuman were installed by Sathya Sai Baba on 30 September 1999.

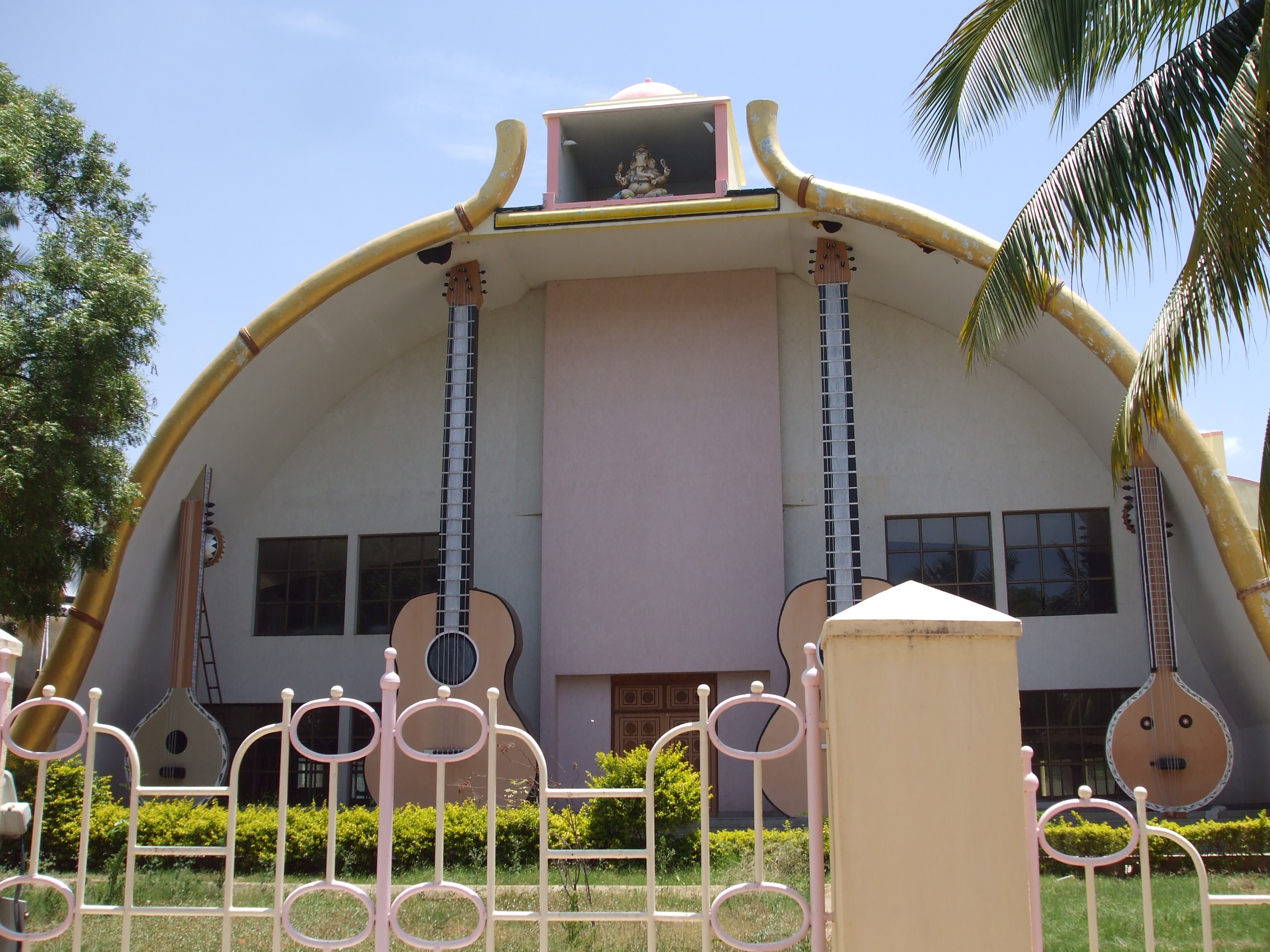
Sathya Sai Music College, Prasanthi Nilayam

The Prasanti Nilayam ashram hosts many mandirs including a Ganesha Mandir, Subramanya Mandir, Gayatri Mandir, a meditation tree planted by Sai Baba in 1950, an eternal heritage museum, Chaitanya Jyoti museum), multiple canteens, cricket ground, indoor sports stadium, super specialty hospital, educational institutions, shopping complex, administration buildings, devotee quarters, accommodation rooms and halls.

== Climate ==
The climate is generally hot and dry throughout the year. Summer temperatures typically range from 30–40 °C (86–104 °F) while winter temperatures range between 20–27 °C (68–81 °F).

== Transport ==
=== Rail ===
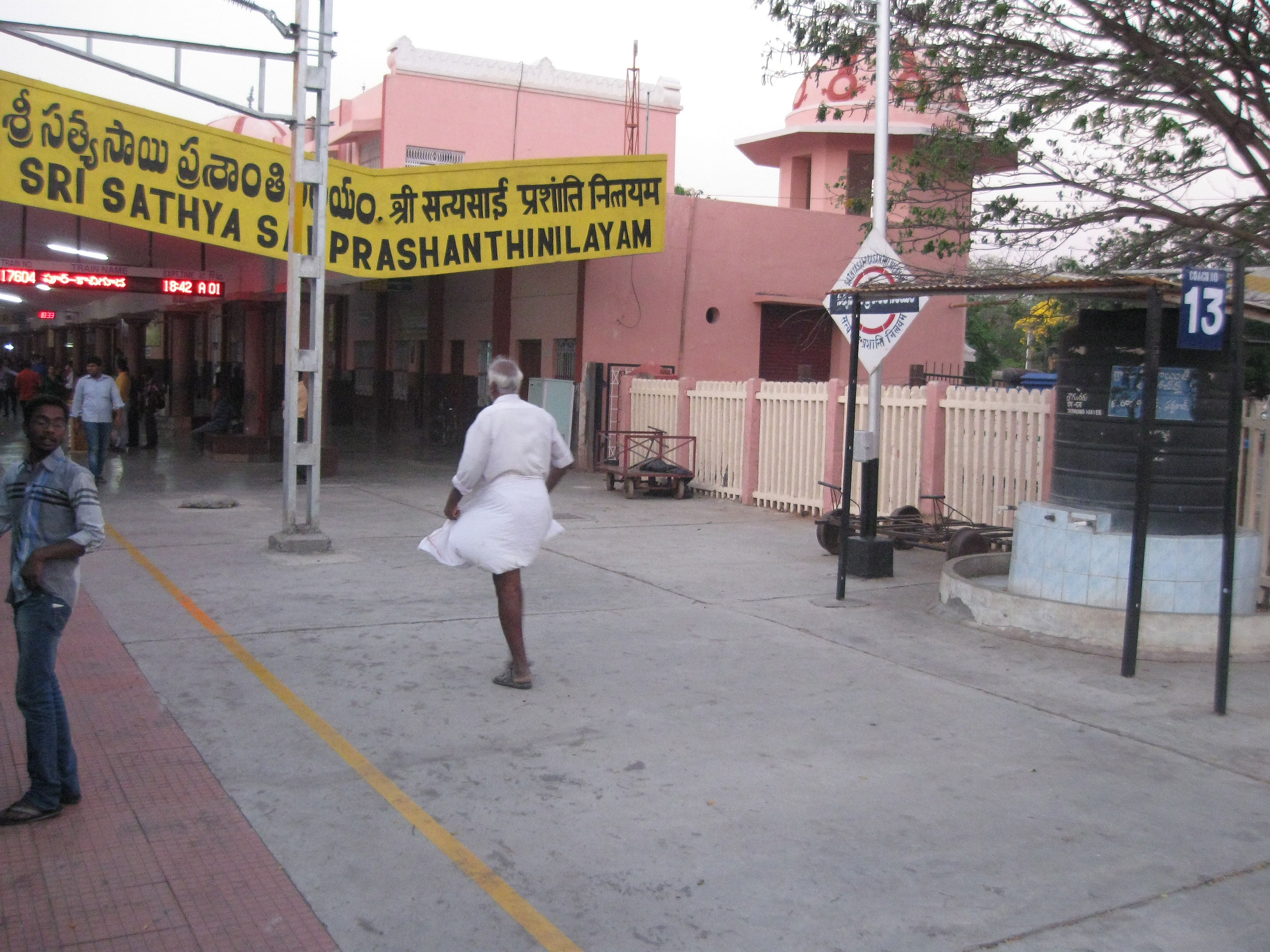
Prashanthi Nilayam Railway Station

Puttaparthi has a railway station named as Sri Sathya Sai Prasanthi Nilayam. The Railway station was inaugurated and became functional on November 23, 2000; Sathya Sai Baba's 74th birthday. It is about 8.6 km to the west of the ashram and 4 km south of the neighboring village of Kothacheruvu. This station falls under the Bangalore Division of the South Western Railway and lies on the Bangalore–Guntakal railway line. Travel time between the Rail station and Puttaparthi is approximately 15–25 minutes through various modes of transportation; cabs, autorickshaws and APSRTC buses. The town is connected directly by train to Bangalore, Secunderabad, Chennai, Vishakapatnam, Vijayawada, Coimbatore, Mumbai, New Delhi, Bhuvaneshwar and Kolkata. Sri Sathya Sai Prasanthi Nilayam railway station is the 5th busiest station in Bangalore division of SWR.

=== Air ===
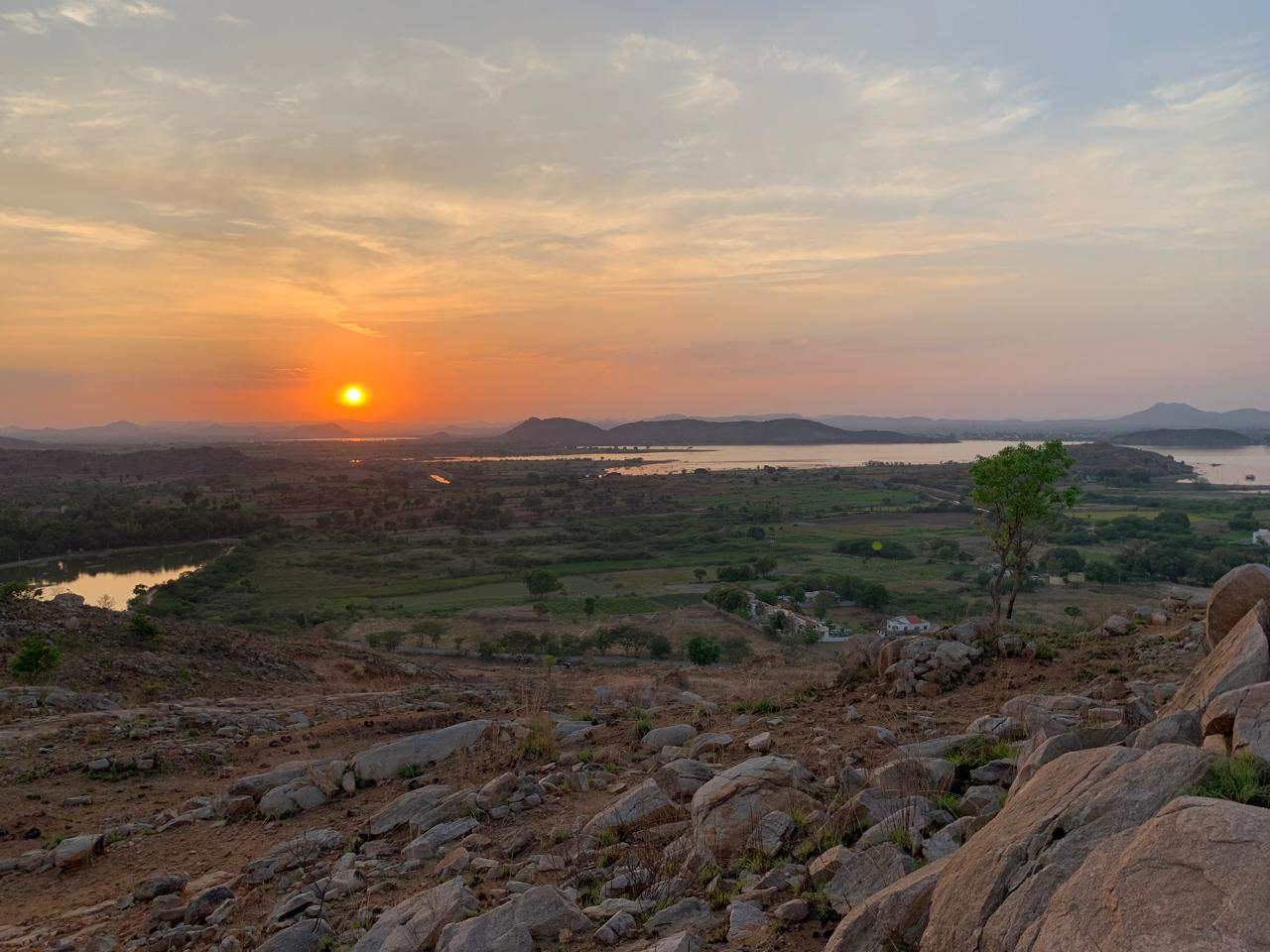
Sunset in Puttaparthi, AP

Puttaparthi has an airport which is 6 kilometres (3.7 mi) from the ashram. It is owned by the Sri Sathya Sai Central Trust and is spread over 450 acres (1.8 km^{2}) of land, housing a runway that is 2,230 metres long. The airport is closed to normal domestic flights, the nearest functional airport is the Kempegowda International Airport at Devanahalli, a suburb of Bangalore which is about 119 kilometres (74 mi) from Puttaparthi.

== See also ==
- Puttaparthi
- Sathya Sai Baba
- Sri Sathya Sai University
- Sri Sathya Sai International Organization (SSSIO)
