= Bhatraju =

Hindu caste of balladeers and panegyrists

- Classification: Other Backward Classes
- Religions: Hinduism
- Languages: Telugu
- Country: India
- Populated states: Andhra Pradesh, Telangana

Bhatraju (also transliterated as Bhatrazu) is an Indian caste of Telugu-speaking ballad reciters, poets, panegyrists, and religious musicians. They are primarily found in the states of Andhra Pradesh and Telangana and also in smaller numbers in the neighbouring states. They are also known as Bhatturaju or Bhataraju or Bhatrajulu.

Bhatrajus were originally a caste of court bards, eulogists, and reciters of family genealogy and tradition. After the fall of indigenous kingdoms, they became mendicants or switched to singing religious songs and praises of richer communities and their traditions at weddings and death ceremonies. They are typically non-vegetarians and bury their dead.

Bhatrajus are on the Other Backward Class (OBC) list in most states of Southern India. They use Raju as their caste title.

== History ==
Bhatraju were originally attached to the courts of the Hindu princes as bards or professional troubadours, reciting ballads in poetry in glorification of the wondrous deeds of local princes and heroes. Rama Raja Bhushanadu, a 16th century poet in the court of Rama Raya of Vijayanagara Empire, is believed to be a Bhatraju.

Bhatrajus were described as "having a wonderful faculty in speaking improvisatore, on any subject proposed to them. But their profession is that of chanting the exploits of former days in front of the troops while marshalling them for battle, and inciting them to emulate the glory of their ancestors." Castes and Tribes of Southern India (1909) notes that Bhatrazus were the only non-Brahmin caste, except Jangams and Pandārams, which performs the duties of guru or religious instructor.

Michael James Spurr researched on the community and analysed old census reports and other anthropological data. In Madras Census Report, 1871, they were described as, "a wandering class, gaining a living by attaching themselves to the establishments of great men, or in chanting the folklore of the people." Madras Census Report, 1891, describes them as, "being a class of professional bards, spread all over the Telugu districts. They are well versed in folklore, and in the family histories and legends of the ancient Rājahs. Under the old Hindu Rājahs the Bhatrāzus were employed as bards, eulogists, and reciters of family genealogy and tradition. Most of them are now cultivators, and only a few are ballad-reciters."

In the present-day, Bhatrajus are also found in smaller numbers in the states of Karnataka and Tamil Nadu. In December 2022, Government of Andhra Pradesh banned the phrase Bhatraju Pogadtalu (transl. Bhatraju paeans) in all spheres including media, film, TV, and political meetings. People using the phrase would be liable to legal action.

== Notable people ==
- Rama Raja Bhushanadu (fl. 16th century CE), Telugu poet in the Vijayanagara court
- Sathya Sai Baba (1926–2011), spiritual guru
