= Narayana Kasturi =

Indian writer

Narayana Kasturi (25 December 1897 – 14 August 1987) was an Indian writer, professor, and journalist.

== Life ==
Kasturi Ranganatha Sharma was born in Tripunithura in the Indian state of Kerala.

Kasturi received his bachelor's degree in law, and his master's degree in arts from the University College, Trivandrum, India. After his degree at the age of 21, he gained a lecturer position in a high school in the city of Mysore. After a few years, Kasturi began to "seriously contemplate on a career in Law."

He received his bachelor's degree in law and master's degree in arts from the University College in Trivandrum. After completing his education, he worked as a lecturer in a high school in Mysore and later as a lecturer in Maharaja's College of Arts. He also served as the Secretary of the Sri Ramakrishna Mission in Mysore for over 17 years. During this time, he came into contact with various spiritual leaders and was initiated into Japam. In 1948, he met Sathya Sai Baba in Bangalore and was requested by Baba to write his biography, which he agreed to and later published as "Sathyam Sivam Sundaram Part I". He later became the editor of the magazine of the Sathya Sai Organization called "Sanathana Sarathi."

In 1949, a University Order appointed Kasturi as the Principal of the Intermediate College in Davangere. He held the position for five years before retiring in 1954. After retirement, he was suggested by Sathya Sai Baba to go on a spiritual pilgrimage to North India with his mother and wife.

In 1956, Sathya Sai Baba convinced Kasturi to accept the position of Producer of Programmes for the newly established All India Radio Station in Bangalore.

Kasturi enjoyed the post and during a visit in 1958, Sathya Sai Baba suggested he work at Puttaparthi and start a monthly magazine called Sanathana Sarathi. Kasturi was responsible for ensuring the magazine was flawless and reached readers on time, with the help of volunteers. The process of typesetting, printing, collating, stapling, packing, and addressing was done by hand, and was seen as a labor of love for Sathya Sai Baba.

== Death ==
Kasturi died at the age of 89 on August 14, 1987 at Sathya Sai General Hospital in Puttaparthi due to natural causes. His cremation took place on the banks of the Chitravathi River the following day. Upon his death, a mourning period was declared in Puttaparthi by Sathya Sai Baba, including the closure of Prasanthi Nilayam and other institutions. Kasturi's wife, Rajamma, had died in 1985.

== As author ==
Kasturi authored the work 'Sathyam Sivam Sundaram', which was translated into English as 'Truth, Goodness, Beauty'. The first part of the book was published in 1960 and covers the first 34 years of the life of Sathya Sai Baba. Kasturi stated that he gathered information for the book from various sources, including Sathya Sai Baba's father and brother, as well as teachers from the schools he attended. The second part of the book was published in 1968, and the complete work was published around 1980. Kasturi stated that a significant amount of time had passed between the publication of certain parts of the book.

Narayana Kasturi was a writer and journalist who wrote for the magazine Koravanji in the 1940s and 1950s. He was known for discovering and promoting the work of young writers, including Kefa, Bulla, Aa. Ra. Se, Na. Kasturi, C.K.N. Raja, Girani Ramsami, and T. Sunandamma. Koravanji was successful during its publication but ceased in 1967 due to financial constraints. Kasturi also wrote hagiographic accounts of Sathya Sai Baba's life and his own autobiography, entitled "Loving God: Eighty-five Years under the Watchful Eye of the Lord" was published in 1982 by Sri Sathya Sai Books and Publications.

== Bibliography ==
- Kasturi, N., Sathyam-Shivam-Sundaram: The Life of Bhagavan Sri Sathya Sai Baba, 4-volume series, ISBN 1-57836-077-3
- Kasturi, N., Easwaramma: The chosen mother, ASIN B0007BFTEY
- Kasturi, N., Loving God: Eighty-five years under the watchful eye of the Lord, ASIN B0007C8W60
- Kasturi, N., Sathya Sai Speaks, Volume IX, ASIN B000IOTMDE
- Kasturi, N., Sathya Sai Speaks: Discourses of Bhagavan Sri Sathya Sai Baba, Volume I, ASIN B000E8PPQW
