= Sri Sathya Sai Institute of Higher Learning =

Deemed university in Andhra Pradesh, India

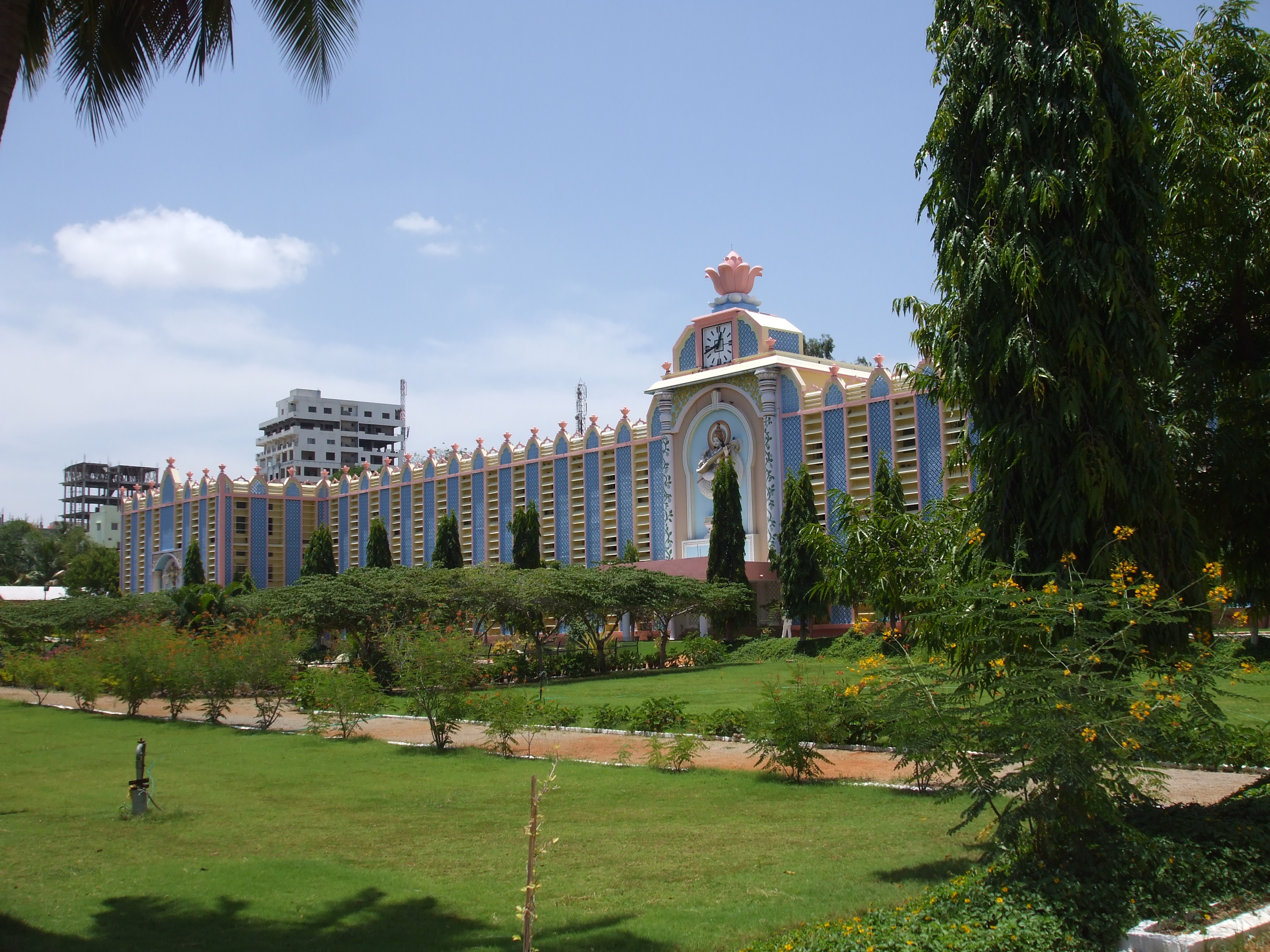
- Sri Sathya Sai University, Puttaparthi, A.P. India
- Motto: Satyam Vada, Dharmam Chara (Speak the Truth; Act Righteously)
- Type: Deemed university
- Established: 1981
- Founder: Sri Sathya Sai Baba
- Chancellor: Krishnamachari Chakravarthi
- Vice-Chancellor: B. Raghavendra Prasad
- Location: Sri Sathya Sai district, Andhra Pradesh, India; 14.1619°N 77.8128°E
- Campus: Prashanthi Nilayam, Anantapur, Brindavan, Nandigiri, India
- Language: English
- Website: sssihl.edu.in

Sri Sathya Sai Institute of Higher Learning is a deemed university located in Sri Sathya Sai District, Andhra Pradesh, India. It is a non-profit educational institution founded by Sri Sathya Sai Baba on 22 November 1981. Founded in 1962 as Sri Sathya Sai Arts and Science College for Women in Anantapur, it was granted autonomy by UGC in 1981.

It has four campuses, three for men at Prashanti Nilayam in Puttaparthi; Whitefield near Bengaluru; Muddenahalli in Karnataka and one for women in Anantapur, Andhra Pradesh.

== Rankings ==
University and College rankings

General – India
- NIRF (Overall) (2022): 101–150
- NIRF (Overall) (2024): 150–200
- NIRF (Universities) (2022): 101–150
- NIRF (Universities) (2024): 150–200

Sri Sathya Sai Institute of Higher Learning was ranked 101-150 among universities in India by the National Institutional Ranking Framework (NIRF) in 2022 and 151–200 in the overall.

== Achievements ==
On November 3, 2023, Casualty Actuarial Society conferred 'Gold level' recognition to SSSIHL as part of CAS University Recognition program, making it the only Asian University to be awarded such. Earlier in 2022 it was awarded a CAS Grant.

== Gallery ==
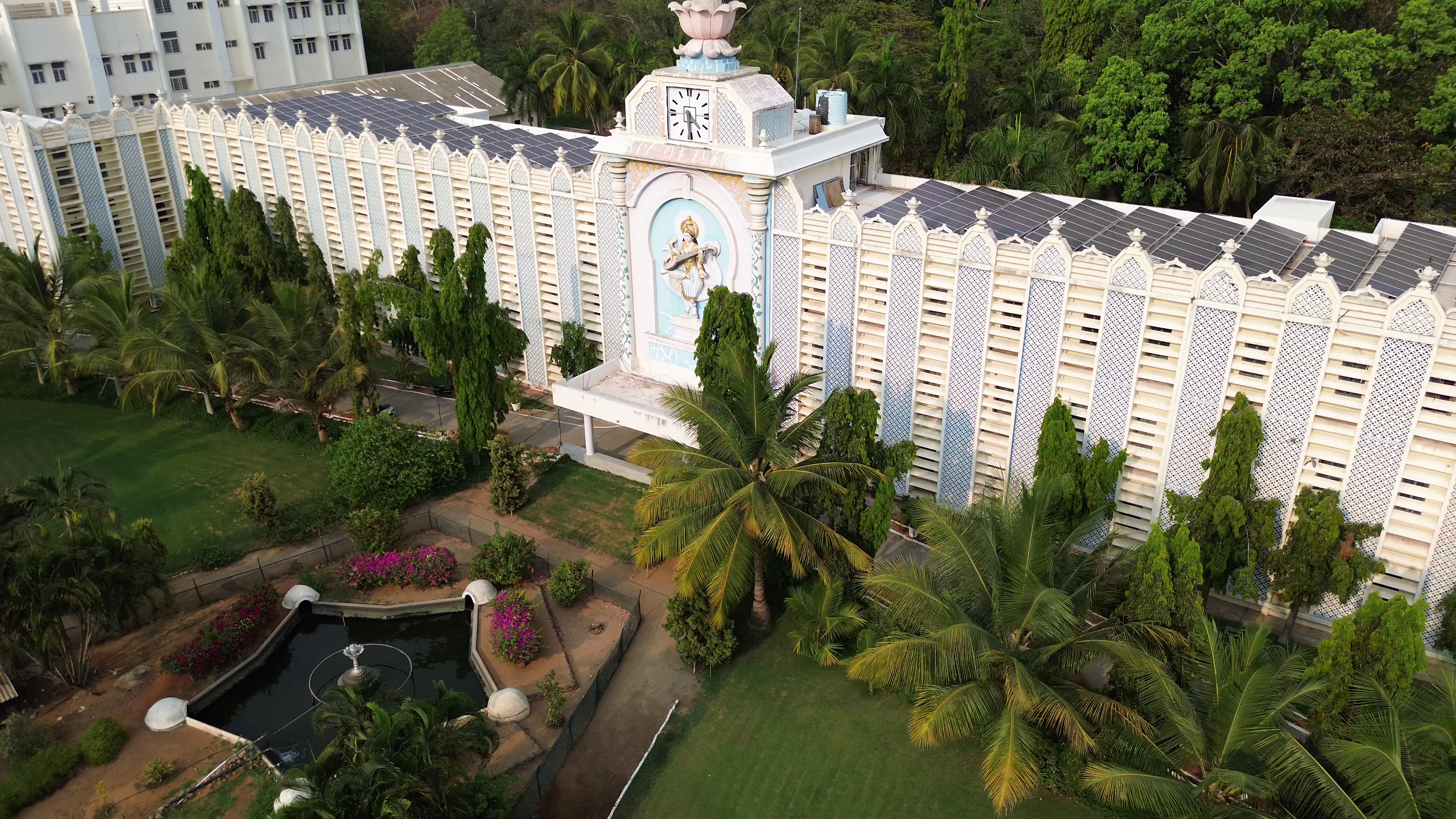
Sri Sathya Sai Institute of Higher Learning - PSN Campus - Main Building

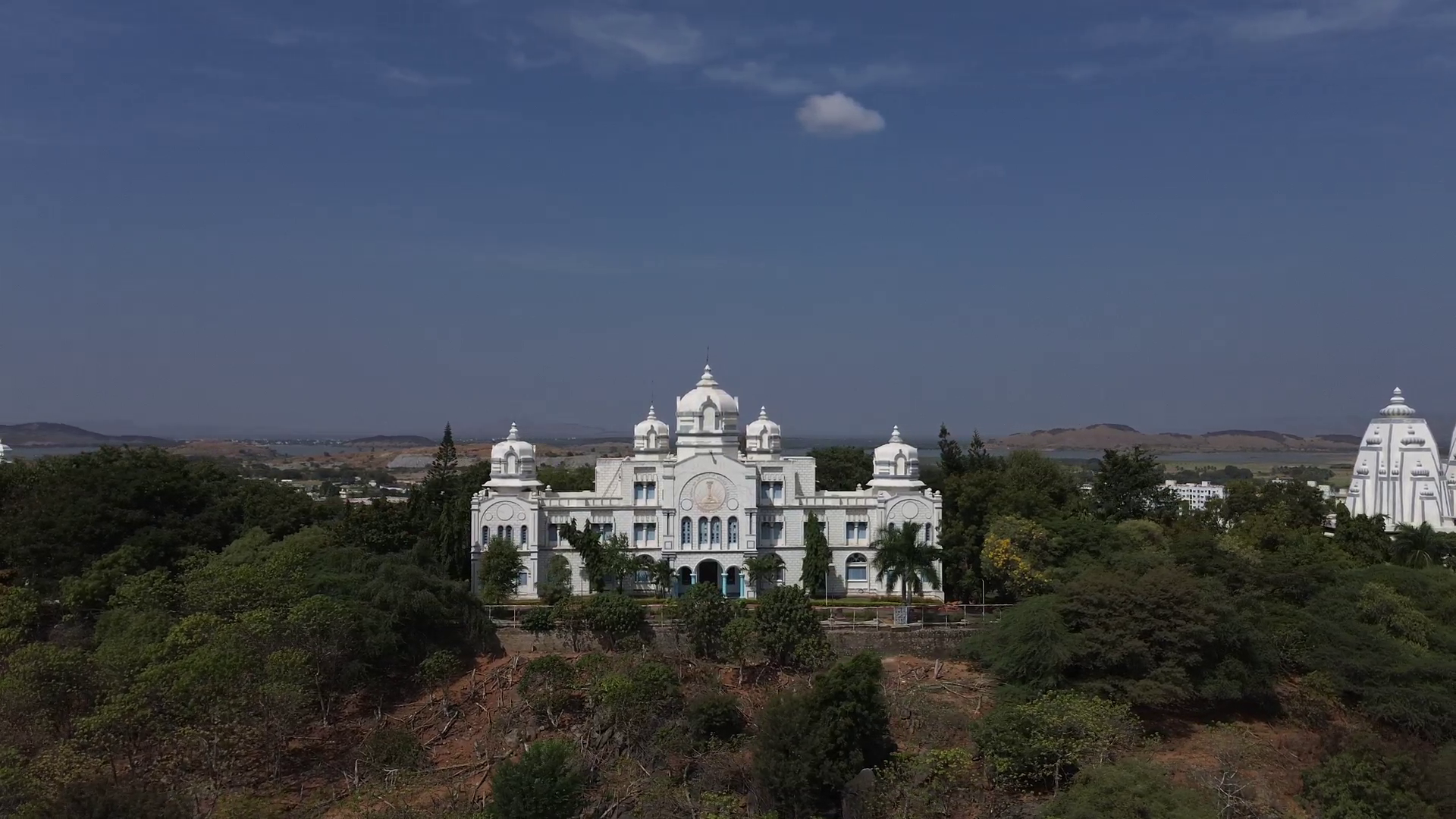
Sri Sathya Sai Institute of Higher Learning - Administrative Block
