= Sri Sathya Sai International Organization =

Indian spiritual and charity organization

Sathya Sai International Organization
- Abbreviation: SSIO
- Formation: 1965
- Type: Non Profit
- Headquarters: No Single Headquarters
- Location: Worldwide
- Members: Multiple Centers Across 120 Countries
- Website: www.sathyasai.org

The Sathya Sai International Organization (SSIO) is a spiritual and humanitarian non-governmental organization founded in the 1960s by Sathya Sai Baba, an Indian guru and spiritual leader. The SSIO’s main objective is to help humans recognise the divinity that is inherent, through the human values of Truth (Sathya), Righteousness (Dharma), Peace (Shanti), Love (Prema) and Non-Violence (Ahimsa). It primarily works within the areas of education and humanitarian aid, in India and internationally.

The SSIO is an umbrella organization which runs several institutes, trusts and associations. According to the organization, there are 1,969 Sathya Sai Centers in 120 countries.

== Medical Care ==
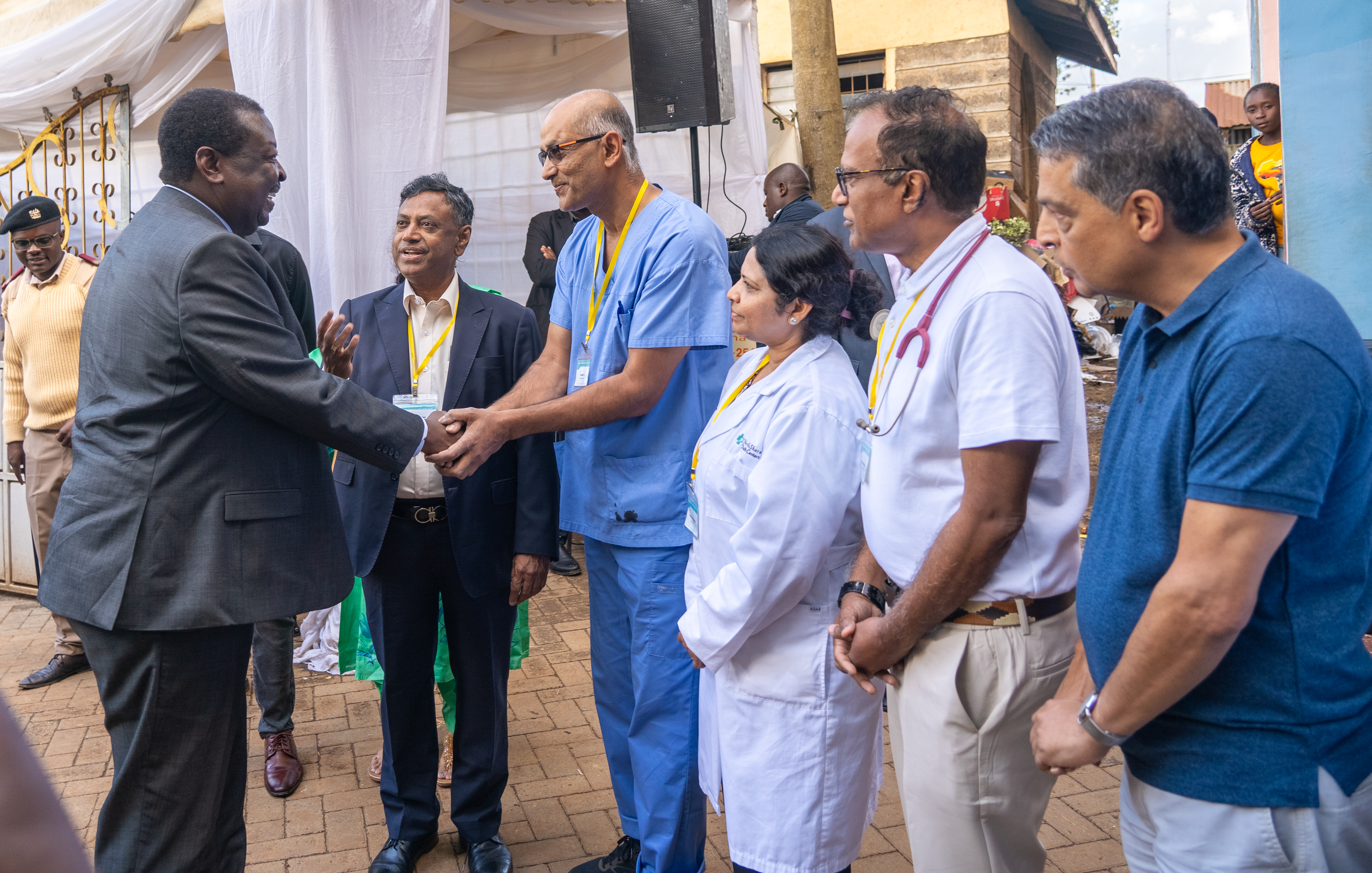
Prime Cabinet Secretary of Kenya, Musalia Mudavadi, appreciating the Sri Sathya Sai International Organization (SSSIO) members for conducting medical camps in Kenya

The Organization has been conducting medical conferences and camps in various countries through its regional arms. Medical camps have been conducted every year in Fiji since 2006. In 2017, Fiji arm and the Australian arm of the Organization conducted a regional conference at the Sangam School of Nursing in Labasa where the Fijian Minister for Health and Medical Services, Rosy Akbar was the chief guest. Thanking the Sathya Sai International Organisation for its key role in serving Fiji communities continuously over the years, she said that Sathya Sai is helping to build a stronger and more harmonious Fiji, through the values of ‘Love, Truth, Right to Conduct, Non-Violence and Peace’.

The SSSIO of Sri Lanka established a hospice called Sathya Sai Suva Sevana at Hanwella, 20 kilometres from the National Cancer Institute (Sri Lanka) in 2002 for providing palliative care to terminally ill cancer patients. It is funded totally by donations made voluntarily and can accommodate up to 50 inmates.Dr. Viswanatha Jeganathan, a founding member of its management committee, was awarded a Palliative Care Excellence Award for his role in advancing hospice and palliative care services in the country.

In April 2024, Prime Cabinet Secretary of Kenya, Musalia Mudavadi, appreciated the organization for conducting medical camps in Kenya.

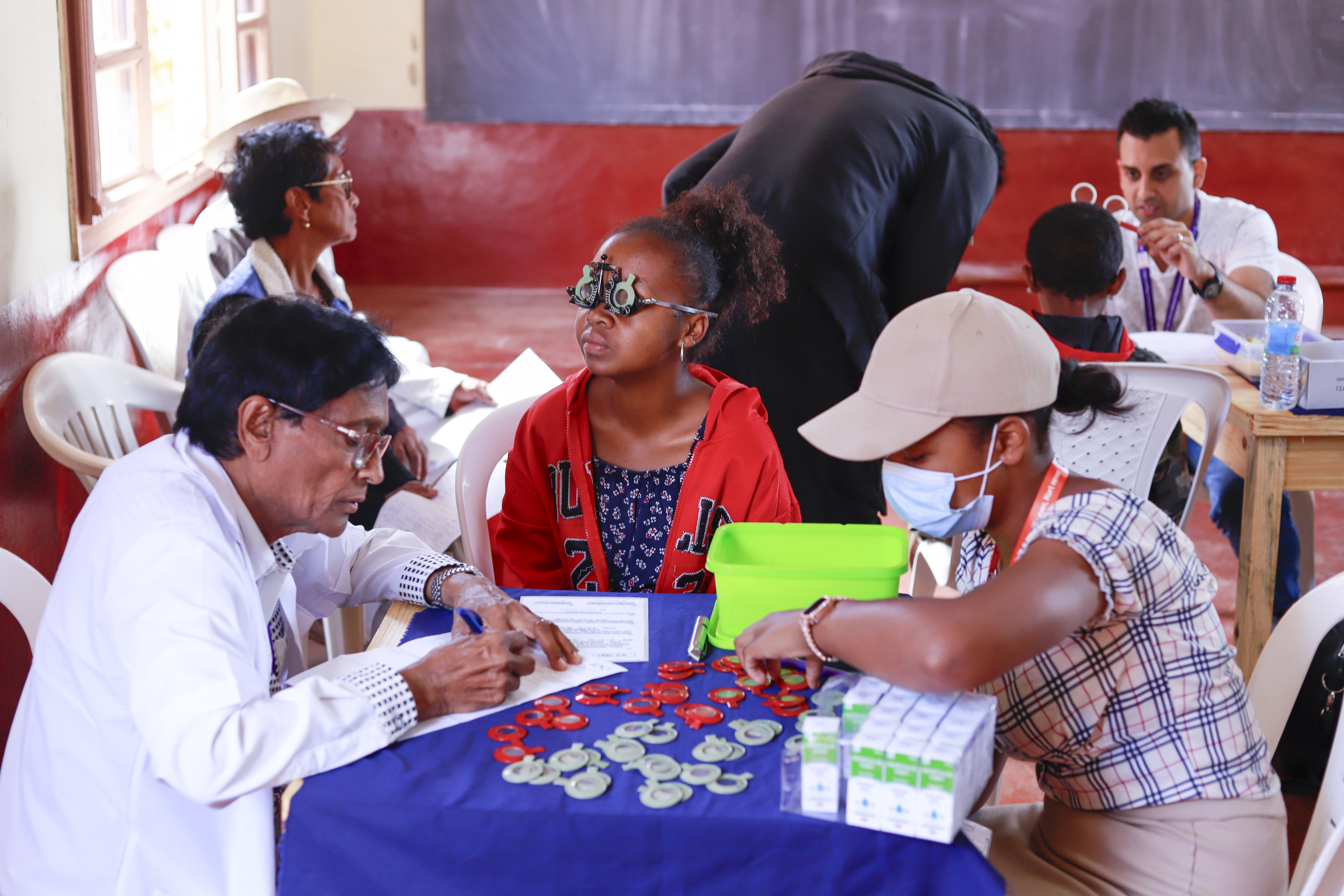
Medical Camp at Madagascar by SSSIO

As a special project in the 100th birthday year of Sathya Sai Baba, the SSSIO conducted a free medical camp providing medical care to more than 6600 patients across 14 specialties from the 21 to 25 April 2025 in Antananarivo, Madagascar.

== Education ==
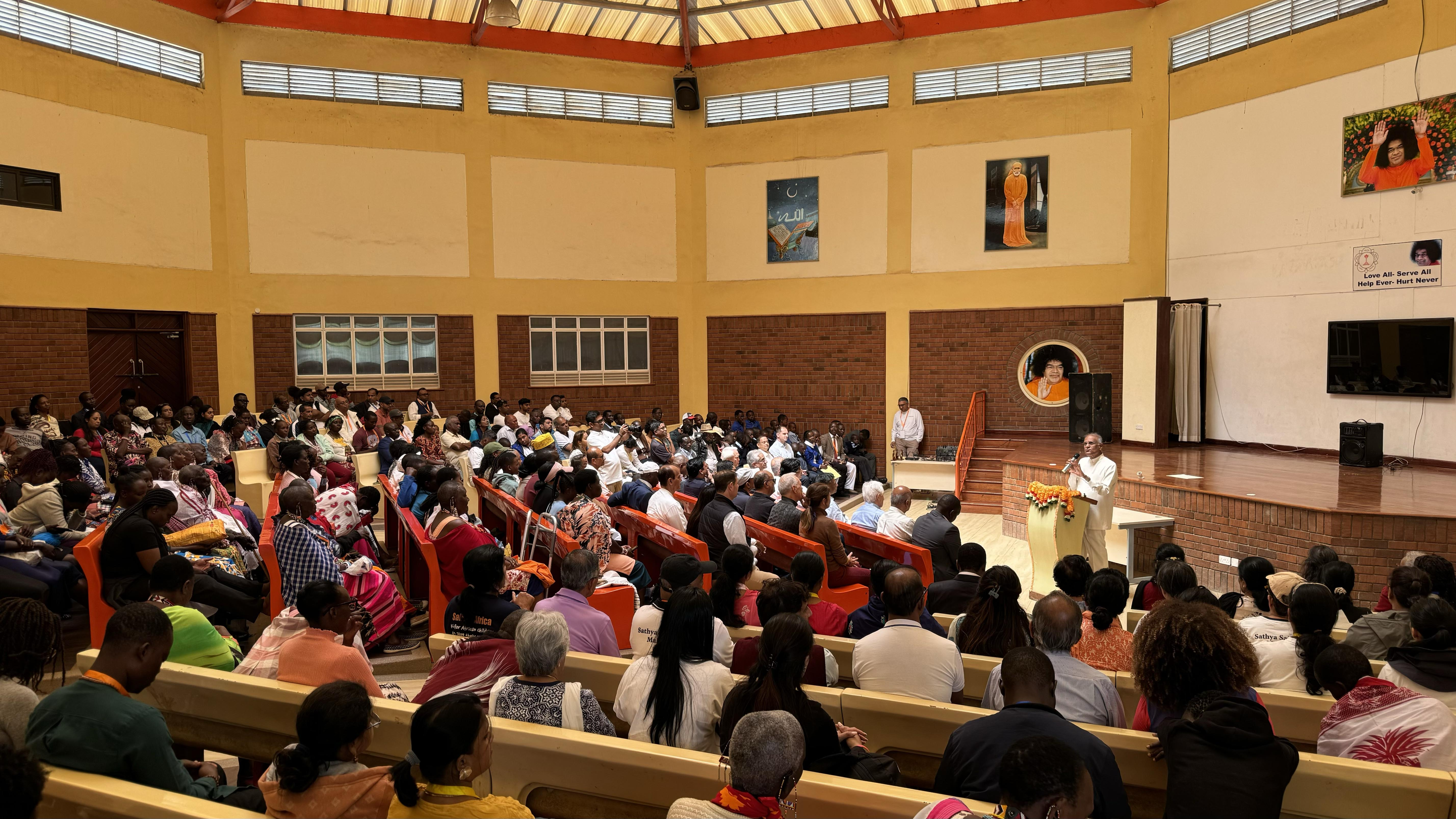
The Sathya Sai School of Kisaju, Nairobi, Kenya

The Sathya Sai International Organization has helped followers set up similar schools in other countries, with the goal of educating children in the five human values of Sathya (Truth), Dharma (Duty), Prema (Love), Shanthi (Peace) and Ahimsa (Non-Violence). Schools have been founded in 33 countries, including Australia, Mexico, United Kingdom, Kenya and Peru.

The Times of Zambia had once published: "The positive influence of Sathya Sai is unprecedented in the annals of education in Zambia. Sai Baba's education ideals as embodied in his human-values-based approach to education are enlightening to educationists in Zambia."

In Australia, at the Tweed Shire Council's inaugural Tweed Sustainability Awards (2019), the SSSIO's Sathya Sai College at Murwillumbah, a K-12, non denominational school in which the NESA curriculum is integrated with the five human values of Love, Peace, Truth, Right Conduct and Non Violence won the Sustainability Award in Education.

Since 2000, the Sathya Sai Primary School at Lautoka in Fiji has been offering nearly free education for children from low socio-economic backgrounds. Apart from the regular curriculum and syllabus from the country's Education Ministry, Value-Education is also taught.

In Canada, the Fraser Institute, an independent Canadian research and educational organization, had ranked the Sathya Sai School of Canada as one of the top 37 elementary schools in Ontario. The Sathya Sai School had scored a perfect 10 out of 10 in the institute's overall rating for academic performance. The school continues to hold top spot even as per the 2026 report that ranked 3052 public, Catholic, and independent schools.

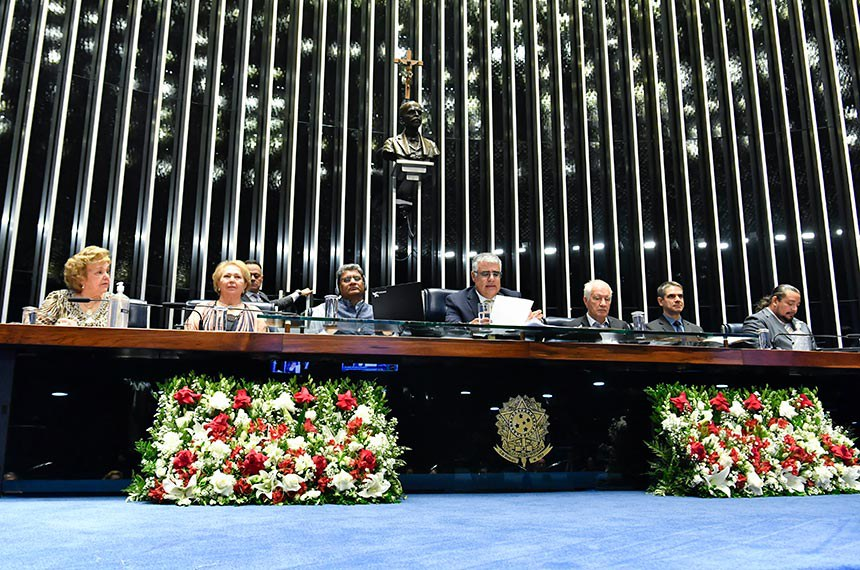
The Brazilian Federal Senate organized a special session to mark the 22nd anniversary of Sathya Sai Institute of Education.

A Sathya Sai School was set up in the Lopburi province of Thailand in 1991 by Art-Ong Jumsai na Ayudhya, with focus on 'human values' along with academics. The school is a role model in Thailand, with hundreds of students from kindergarten up to high school level, and offers everything, including boarding, free-of-charge. The school is able to fund itself by growing its own rice and vegetables. It also produces solar and hydro electricity, selling surplus supply to the Provincial Electricity Authority.

The Barbados Advocate reported that the SSSIO's "brand of education is more targeted towards character education" during the course of a large public meeting on the global impact of the Sathya Sai Education in Human Value (SSEHV) Programme held in the island.

The Federal Senate (Brazil) held a special session to celebrate the 22nd anniversary of Sathya Sai Institute of Education (an arm of the organization) in Brazil

In Trinidad and Tobago, the Longdenville Sathya Sai Primary School, previously operated solely by the Sri Sathya Sai Baba Organisation of Trinidad and Tobago, gained government-assisted status in 2025. The school's students achieved 87.5% above the national average in the 2024 Secondary Entrance Assessment (SEA) results.

== SSSIO Around The World ==
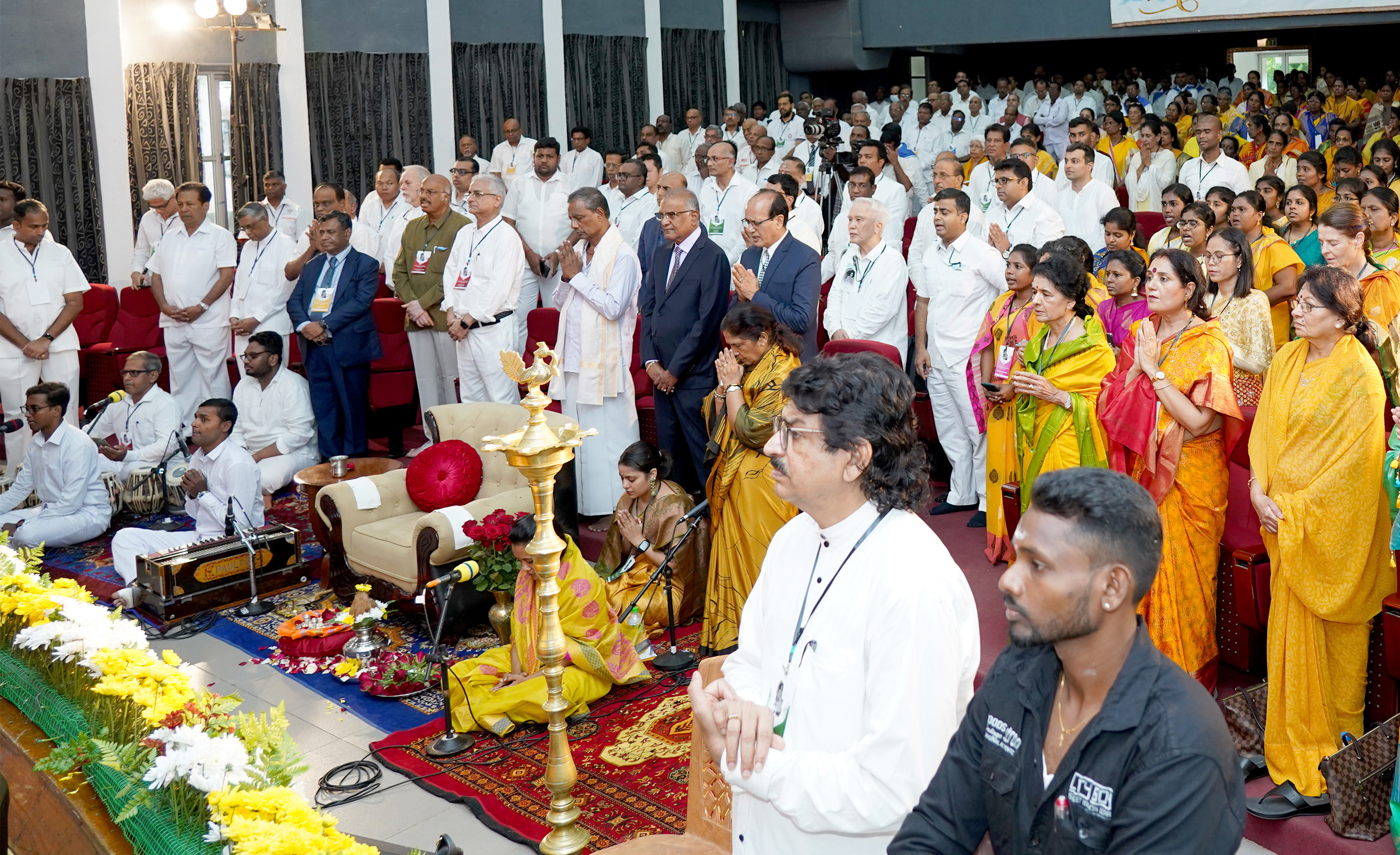
The Sri Sathya Sai International Conference was held at the University of Jaffna, Sri Lanka on the theme "My Life is His Message" in September 2023

The SSSIO of Sri Lanka has been actively carrying out educational, spiritual, and service activities and projects all across Sri Lanka through its arms in the North Region, North Central Region, Central Region, Southern Region and Western Region. It constantly builds on the good work previously done, expanding the number of samithis or service stations. Activities include providing permanent homes with all facilities to the needy. Another regular activity is the 'Walk For Values' where members pledge to follow the universal human values - truth, right conduct, peace, love and non-violence in daily life and inspire others also to do the same. In September 2023, an international conference was held by the organization at the University of Jaffna on the theme "My Life is His Message".

The SSSIO held an international conference in Nairobi, Kenya in June–July 2024, which was attended by delegates from 35 countries and included the Prime Cabinet Secretary of Kenya, Musalia Mudavadi, and Kenyan long-distance runner Eliud Kipchoge, who spoke at the event.

The Sathya Sai International Organization of Malaysia carries out regular charitable activities including food and rations distribution, especially centred around festivals and celebrations.

The Sathya Sai International Organization of Fiji works with the government in providing service, education, medical care and disaster relief. It also undertakes regular activities in areas of devotion and spiritual study.

In 2025, the Sri Sathya Sai Baba Spiritual Centre of Ottawa-Carleton, an SSSIO-affiliated spiritual centre in Ottawa, committed CAD 1 million to The Ottawa Hospital’s “Campaign to Create Tomorrow” in support of patient care, medical research, and innovation. The donation was made in celebration of the 100th birth anniversary of Sri Sathya Sai Baba.
