= VR Bengaluru =

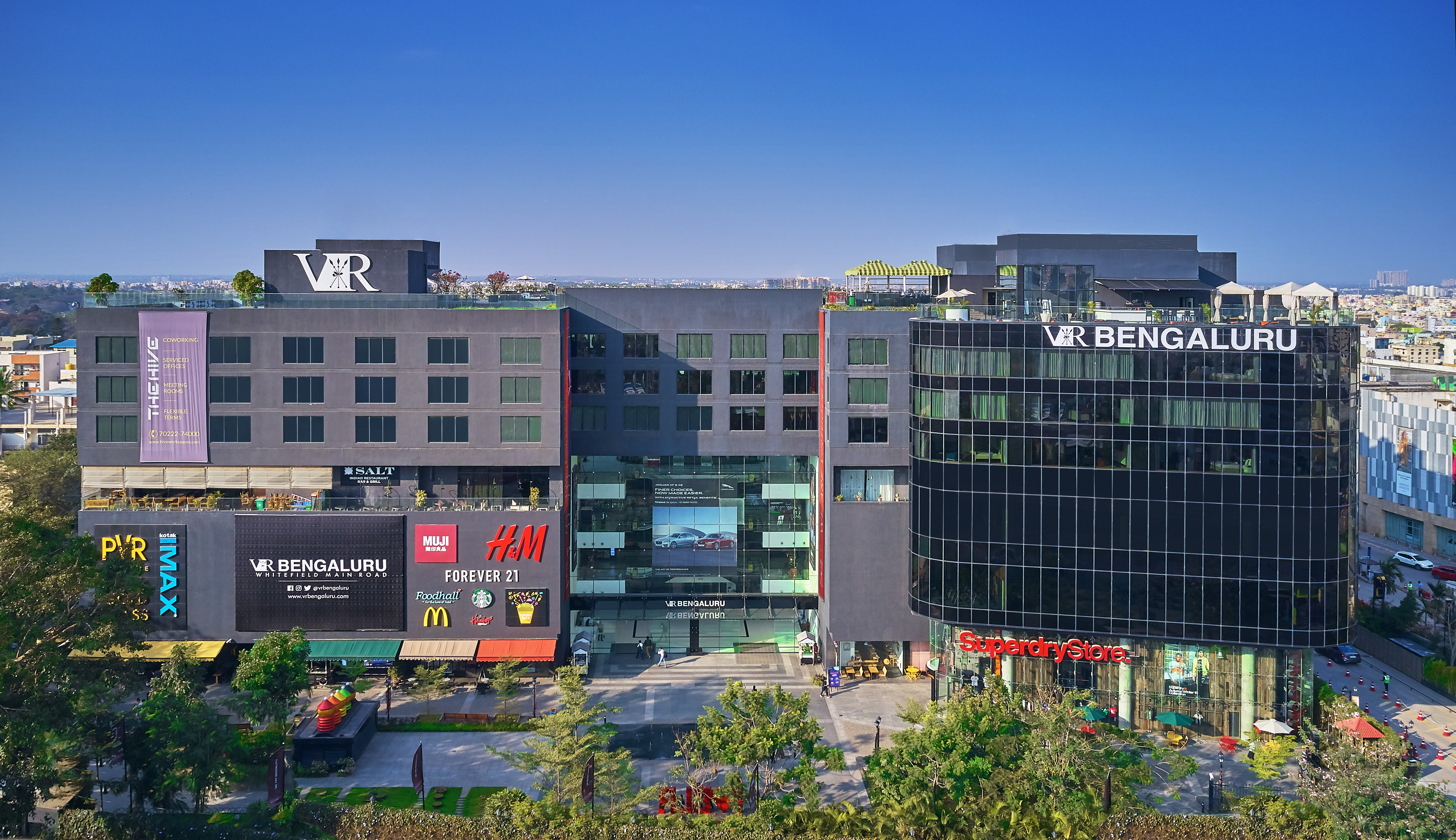
- VR Bengaluru - Black Box On Whitefield Road
- Location: Whitefield, Bangalore, India
- Coordinates: 12.996°N 77.695°E
- Opened: 2015
- Developer: Virtuous Retail
- Manager: Virtuous Retail
- Owner: Virtuous Retail
- Num. of stores: 100+
- Floor area: 600,000 square feet (56,000 m^{2})
- Floors: 7
- Public transit: Purple at Singayyanapalya
- Website: vrbengaluru.com

VR Bengaluru, is a mixed-use retail development in India, situated in Whitefield, Bangalore. Its gross floor area is 600,000 square feet (56,000 m^{2}). In addition to the retail arcade, the compound hosts a hotel, a multiplex with the largest Gold Class in India along with an IMAX, commercial spaces and customisable collaborative working spaces for start-ups and entrepreneurs.

The centre consists of The Hive - a co-working space, The Waverly - Hotel & Residences and the SkyDeck - an activated rooftop with a temperature-controlled pool, a jogging track and an open-air LED screen. South India's first H&M store was launched there in 2016.

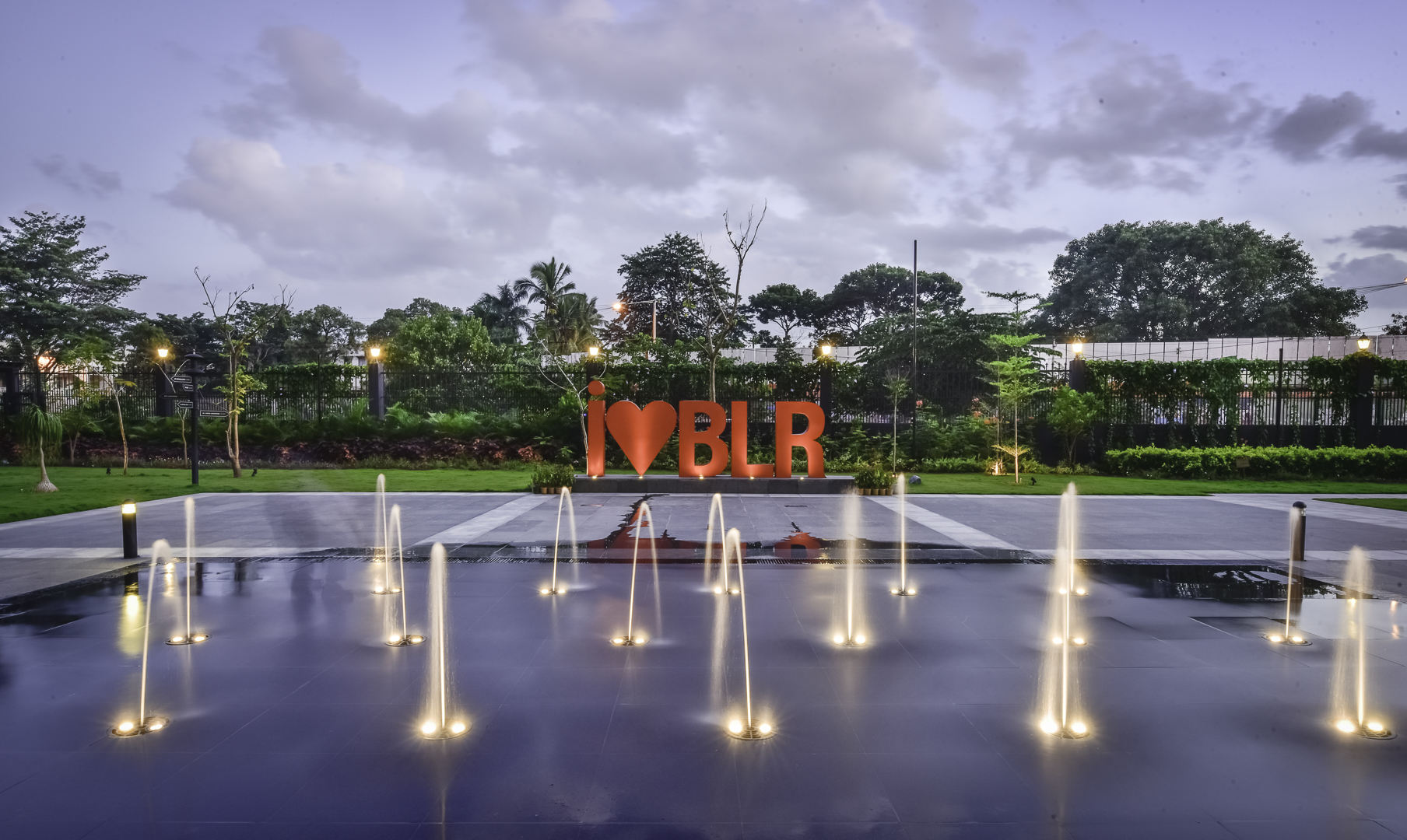
Garden City @ VR Bengaluru

== About ==
This center is owned, developed and operated by Virtuous Retail South Asia Pte Ltd. VR Bengaluru is part of a mixed-use development which includes residential spaces, a retail arcade and customisable collaborative working spaces. VR Bengaluru is touted as a "first-of-its-kind community-centric integrated lifestyle destination of the city". The centre is home to an assortment of brands, a nine-screen multiplex including a purpose-built IMAX which is the biggest in Bangalore, apart from India's largest Gold Class, several pubs, cafes and restaurants spread across the centre, an upscale food court and several fitness & wellness options.

The open landscaped events space at VR Bengaluru, known as "Garden City" regularly hosts community events such as music festivals, farmers’ & artisan markets, activities for children, etc.

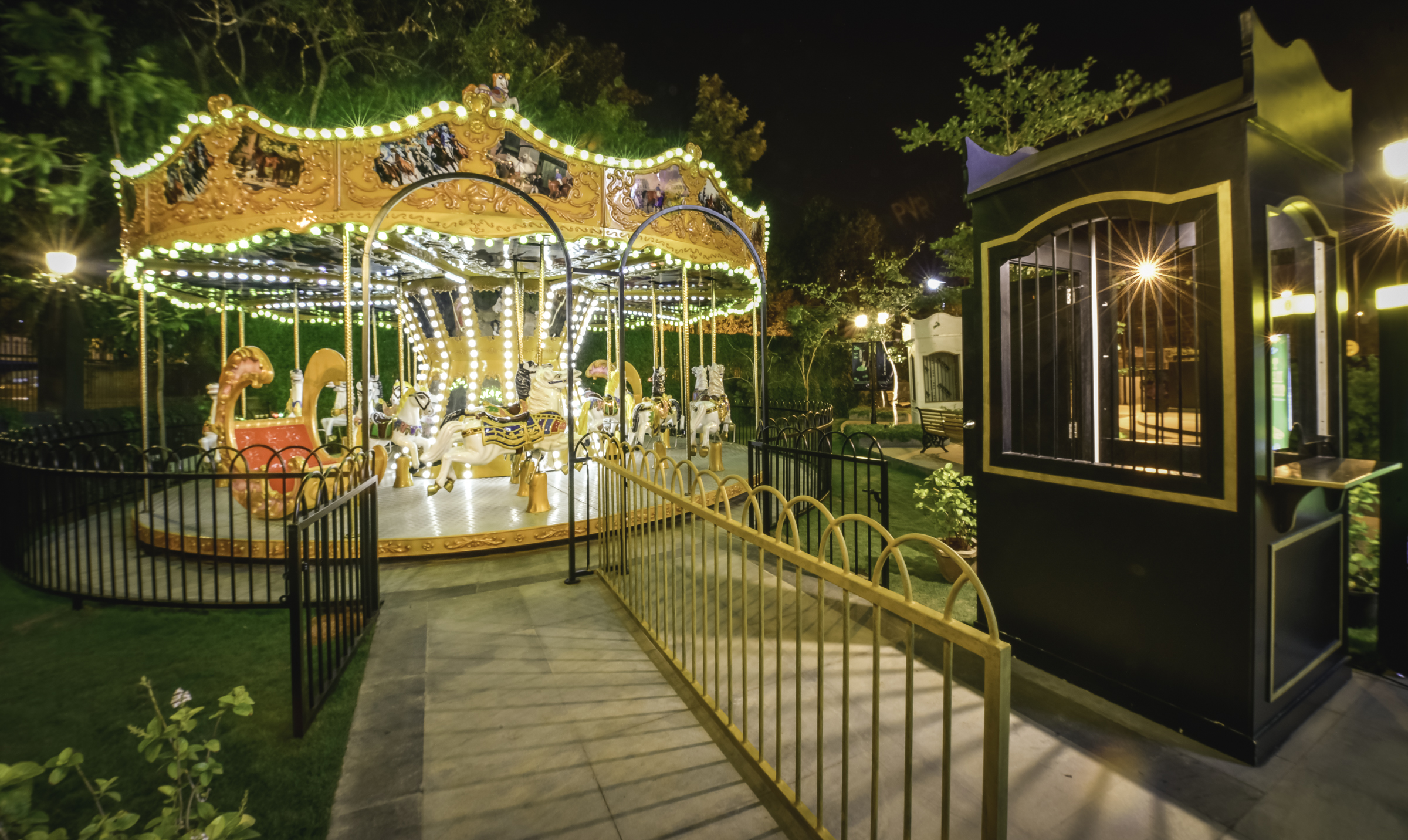
The Magic Circle - Vintage Carousel at VR Bengaluru

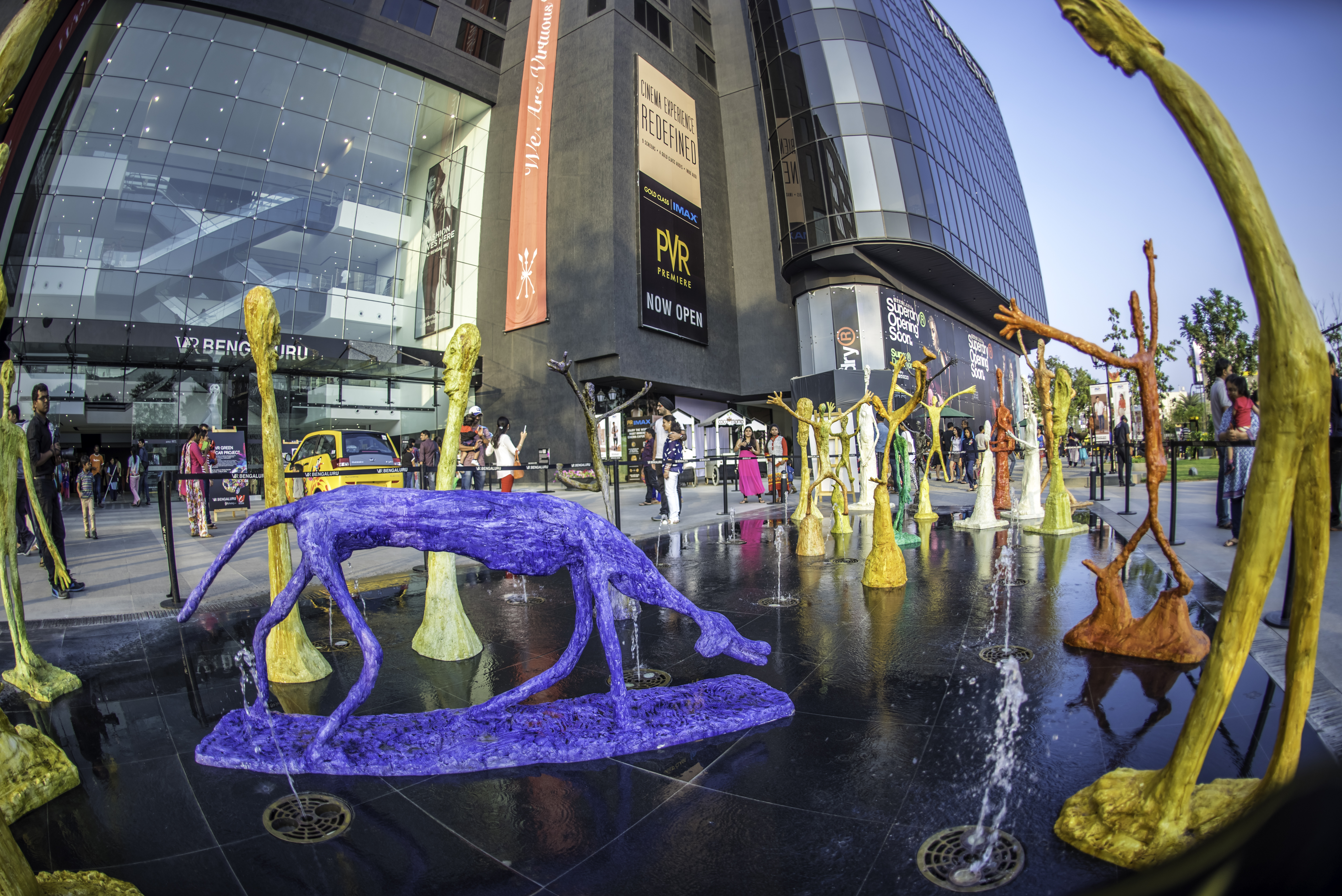
Whitefield Art Collective 2016 at Garden City, VR Bengaluru

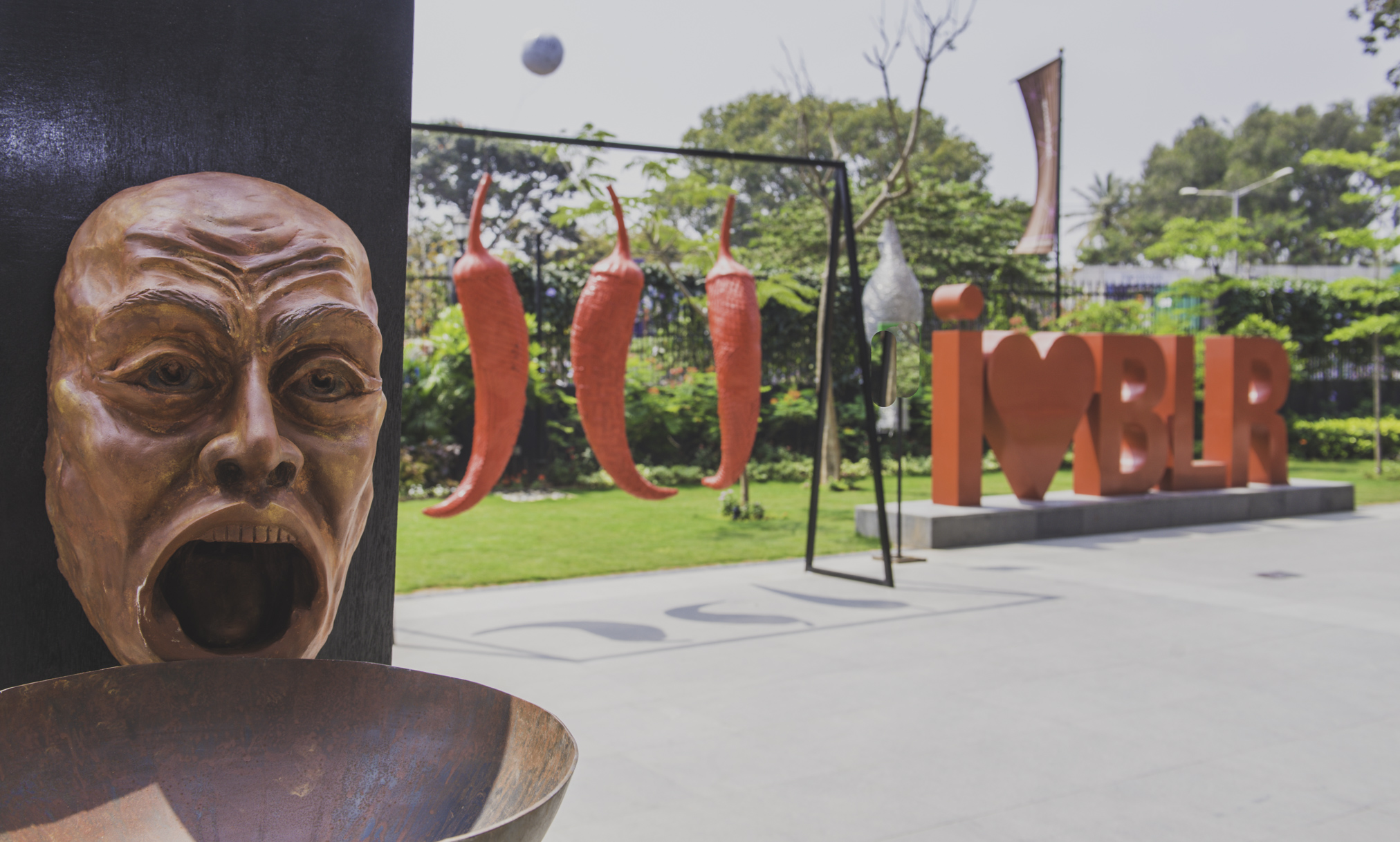
Whitefield Art Collective 2016 at Garden City, VR Bengaluru

== Entertainment ==
VR Bengaluru has a 9-screen multiplex from PVR, Bangalore's second IMAX theatre, and India's biggest Gold Class theatres. It is Bangalore's only purpose-built IMAX screen and not retrofitted from a pre-existing screen, thus delivering an IMAX experience to viewers.

Apart from a cinema, the centre also places kids at the top of its list of patrons to engage. To this end, they have pedestrianised outdoor locales with a landscaped "Garden City" area where kids can run, play and be themselves without worrying about traffic or other hazards present in an urban environment.

VR Bengaluru has also invested in "Magic Garden", a sculpted, soft foam play area for kids that is safe, secure and germ free.

== See also ==
- List of shopping malls in Bangalore
- List of shopping malls in India
- VR Chennai
