= Vydehi Institute of Medical Sciences and Research Centre =

Medical college and hospital in Bangalore

Vydehi Institute of Medical Sciences & Research Centre
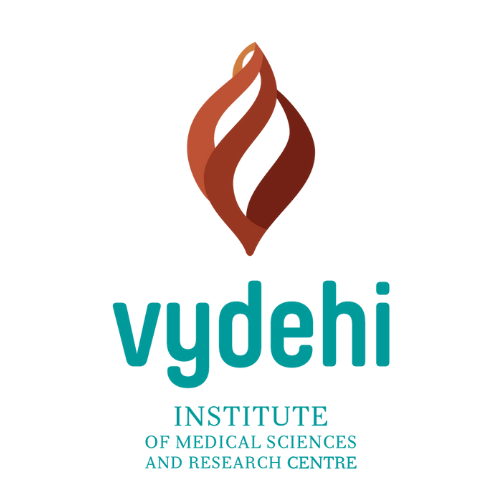
- Type: Medical College and Hospital
- Established: 2000
- Founder: Dr. D. K. Audikeshavulu
- Accreditation: NABH, NABL
- Affiliations: Rajiv Gandhi University of Health Sciences; National Medical Commission
- Chairperson: Dr. Kalpaja D. A.
- Undergraduates: 250
- Postgraduates: 190
- Location: Bengaluru, Karnataka, India; 12°58′32.4″N 77°43′44.7″E
- Campus: 65 acres (26 ha), #82, EPIP Area, Nallurahalli, Whitefield, Bengaluru-560066
- Website: vims.ac.in

Vydehi Institute of Medical Sciences & Research Centre (VIMS&RC) is in Whitefield, Bangalore, India. It is an independent medical institute dedicated to education, research and patient care. VIMS was established in 2000 and is promoted by Srinivasa trust.

== History ==
The Vydehi Institute of Medical Sciences & Research Centre (VIMS&RC) and its 1600 bedded multi-specialty hospital is set up in a unitary campus founded by Dr. D. K. Audikesavulu in 2000.

It is a Private Unaided Institution. The Institution is located at Nallurahalli, Whitefield, Bangalore in the State of Karnataka.

The Institution is recognized by National Medical Commission and erstwhile Medical Council of India and Department of Health & Family Welfare Services, Government of India, New Delhi and affiliated to Rajiv Gandhi University of Health Sciences, Karnataka.

== Academics ==
Vydehi Institute of Medical Sciences & Research Centre offers 250 seats annually for the MBBS undergraduate course, 190 seats for postgraduate (MD/MS) courses, 25 seats for Super Speciality (DM/M.Ch) courses, 06 seats for the Super Speciality Fellowship, and 02 seats for each Ph.D Course. The curriculum integrates modern technology and innovative research in real-world scenarios to enhance the quality of medical education.

== Courses ==
Degree	Courses
Undergraduate degree	MBBS
Doctor of Medicine (MD)	Physiology, Biochemistry, Pathology, Microbiology, Pharmacology, Forensic Medicine, Community Medicine, General Medicine, Dermatology, Psychiatry, Respiratory Medicine, Pediatrics, Anesthesiology, Radio Diagnosis, Radiation Oncology, Hospital Administration, Emergency Medicine
Master of Surgery (MS)	Anatomy, General Surgery, Orthopedics, Ophthalmology, ENT, OBG
Super Speciality (DM)	Cardiology, Endocrinology, Gastroenterology, Neurology, Oncology,
Super Speciality (M.Ch.)	CTVS, Neuro Surgery, Plastic Surgery, Surgical Oncology, Urology
Ph.D.	Anatomy, Physiology, Biochemistry, Pharmacology, Microbiology
Fellowship	Intensive Care

== Recognitions and Tie-ups ==
Vydehi Institute of Medical Sciences & Research Centre is recognized by the National Medical Commission, erstwhile Medical Council of India, Ministry of Health and Family Welfare (MOHFW), Government of India and is included in the directory of the World Health Organization, which is required to be recognized internationally for postgraduate education and employment opportunities. It has tie-ups with the University of Georgia and the California State University, Los Angeles.

== Vydehi Hospital ==
Established by Srinivasa Trust, the Medical College and Teaching Hospital focuses on providing healthcare services, promoting community health, and offering comprehensive training for healthcare professionals. Vydehi Hospital offers allopathic treatment for various diseases and disorders, with diagnostic and therapeutic facilities available.

The independent health institute provides a variety of general and multi-specialty medical treatments, including both modern surgery and traditional Ayurvedic methods. The institute also offers integrated medical education, supported by qualified teachers, mentors, and practitioners.

== Health Insurance Schemes ==
A long list of state government/s and government of India health insurance schemes are empanelled by the institute:

- Ayushman Bharat Arogya Karnataka (ABARK): A health insurance scheme launched by the Government of Karnataka to provide healthcare coverage to its citizens.
- Rajiv Arogya Bhagya (RAB): A health insurance scheme launched by the Government of Karnataka to provide healthcare coverage to its citizens, particularly the poor and marginalized.
- Jyothi Sanjeevini (JSS): A health insurance scheme launched by the Government of Karnataka to provide healthcare coverage to its citizens, particularly those living in rural areas.
- Arogya Bhagya Yojane (ABY): A health insurance scheme launched by the Government of Karnataka to provide healthcare coverage to its citizens, particularly those living in rural areas.
- Bruhat Bangalore Mahanagara Palike (BBMP): A municipal corporation in Bangalore that provides healthcare services to its citizens.
- AP Government Employee Health Scheme (EHS): A health insurance scheme launched by the Government of Andhra Pradesh to provide healthcare coverage to its employees.
- Dr. YSR Aarogyasri Scheme: A health insurance scheme launched by the Government of Andhra Pradesh to provide healthcare coverage to its citizens, particularly those living in rural areas.
- Ayushman Bharat Yojana (PMJAY): A national health insurance scheme launched by the Government of India to provide healthcare coverage to its citizens, particularly those living below the poverty line.
- Yeshasvini: A health insurance scheme launched by the Karnataka Milk Federation (KMF) to provide healthcare coverage to its dairy farmers and their families

== Accreditation ==
The Hospital accredited by the National Accreditation Board for Hospitals & Healthcare Providers (NABH) and National Accreditation Board for Testing and Calibration Laboratories (NABL).

== Admissions ==
Admissions for MBBS (UG) & MD/MS (PG):- Selection of candidates will be on the basis of the NEET Rank obtained in National Eligibility cum Entrance Test (NEET) and through the centralized counseling conducted by Single Window agency/Counseling Authority i.e., Karnataka Examination Authority (KEA) of Government of Karnataka.

Admissions for DM/M.Ch (SS). Selection of candidates will be on the basis of the NEET Rank obtained in National Eligibility cum Entrance Test (NEET) and through the centralized counseling conducted by Single Window Agency/ Counseling Authority i.e., Medical Counselling Committee (MCC) – Directorate General of Health Services (DGHS), Government of India. In compliance of the Direction of Hon’ble Supreme Court there is no reservation applicable in Super Specialty (D.M. /M.Ch.) courses.

== Research ==
VIMS&RC employs a collaborative approach to offer students exposure to medical research and training. The institute is equipped with infrastructure for conducting research in medical subjects and is dedicated to advancing medical education, healthcare, and research. The Institutional Ethics Committee is approved by the Central Drugs Standard Control Organization (CDSCO) and the Directorate of Health Research (DHR).

VIMS & RC has tie-ups with the Bharat Biotech, which signed an international cooperation agreement with California State University, Los Angeles and the University of Georgia, Athens, USA, for research-oriented work to update the knowledge database. Vydehi Institute further widens its academic horizon with the establishment of super-specialty departments

== List of Institutes ==
Vydehi Institute of Medical Sciences & Research Centre has the following academic institutions in the same campus.

   Vydehi Institute of Pharmacy

- Vydehi Institute of Medical Sciences and Research Centre.
- Vydehi Hospital.
- Vydehi Institute of Dental Sciences and Research Centre.
- Vydehi Institute of Nursing Sciences and Research Centre.
- Vydehi School of Nursing Sciences.
- Vydehi Institute of Allied Health Sciences.
- Vydehi Institute of Physiotherapy.
- Vydehi Institute of Law
- Vydehi Institute of Rehabilitation Centre.
- Vydehi School of Excellence.
- Vydehi Special School.

== VASA ==
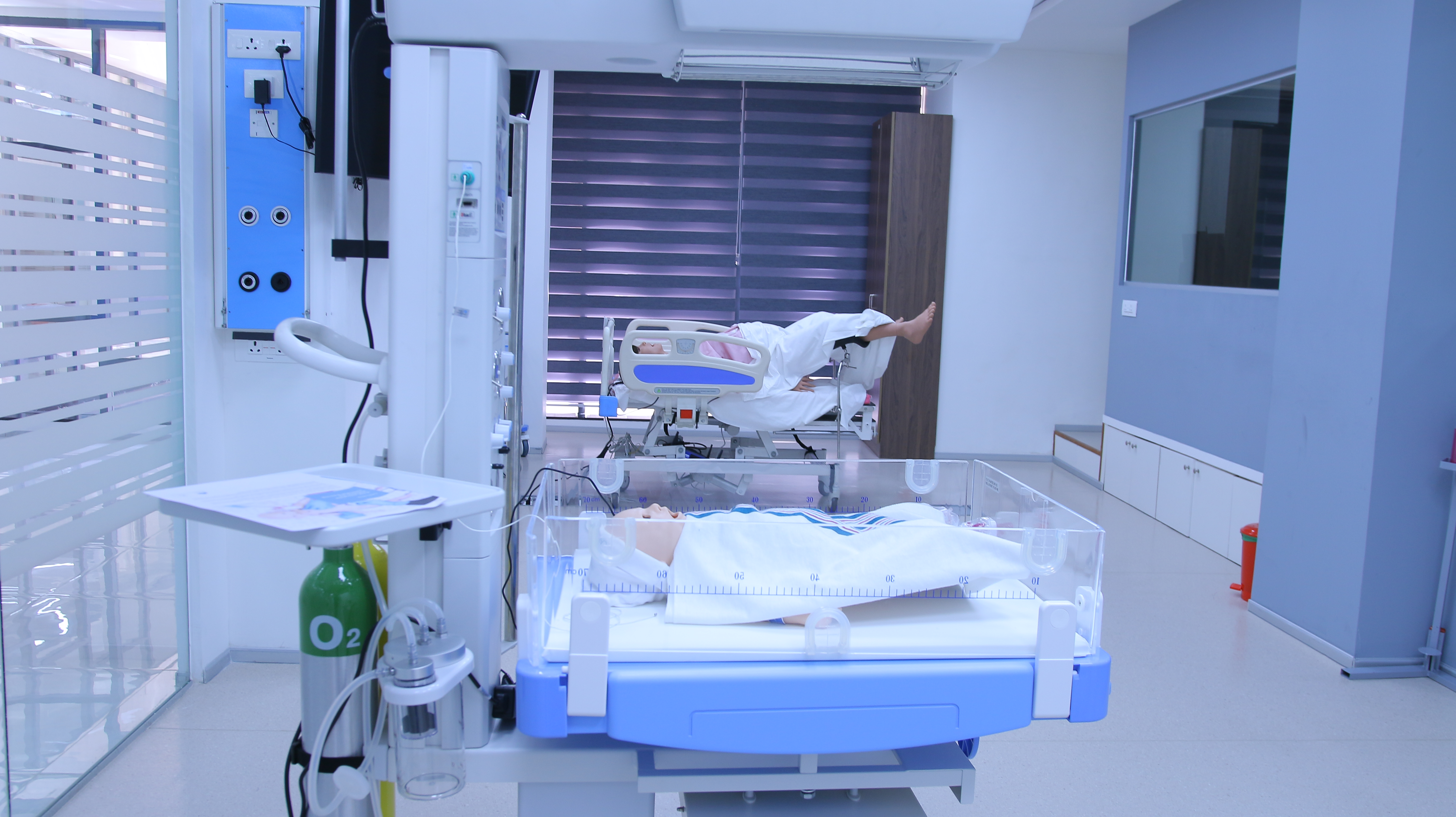
Vydehi Advanced Simulation Academy

Vydehi Institute of Medical Sciences and Research Centre has added onto its stellar medical ecosystem VASA, Asia's largest, most comprehensive, State of the Art, Multidisciplinary Medical and Surgical Simulation centre. spread over 31,500 sq. ft., VASA is equipped with Patient simulations, Surgical simulations, Ultrasound simulations, simulation centre management system and lots more.

- Advanced Simulation Zones:
- Ambulance
- EMD and ICU- Patient simulators and surgical cut suite
- Obstetrics and Neonatal ICU
- Operating room and Anesthesia
- Ultrasound Simulation
- Interventional Radiology
- Task training
- Surgical Suites- LapVR, EndoVR and NeuroVR

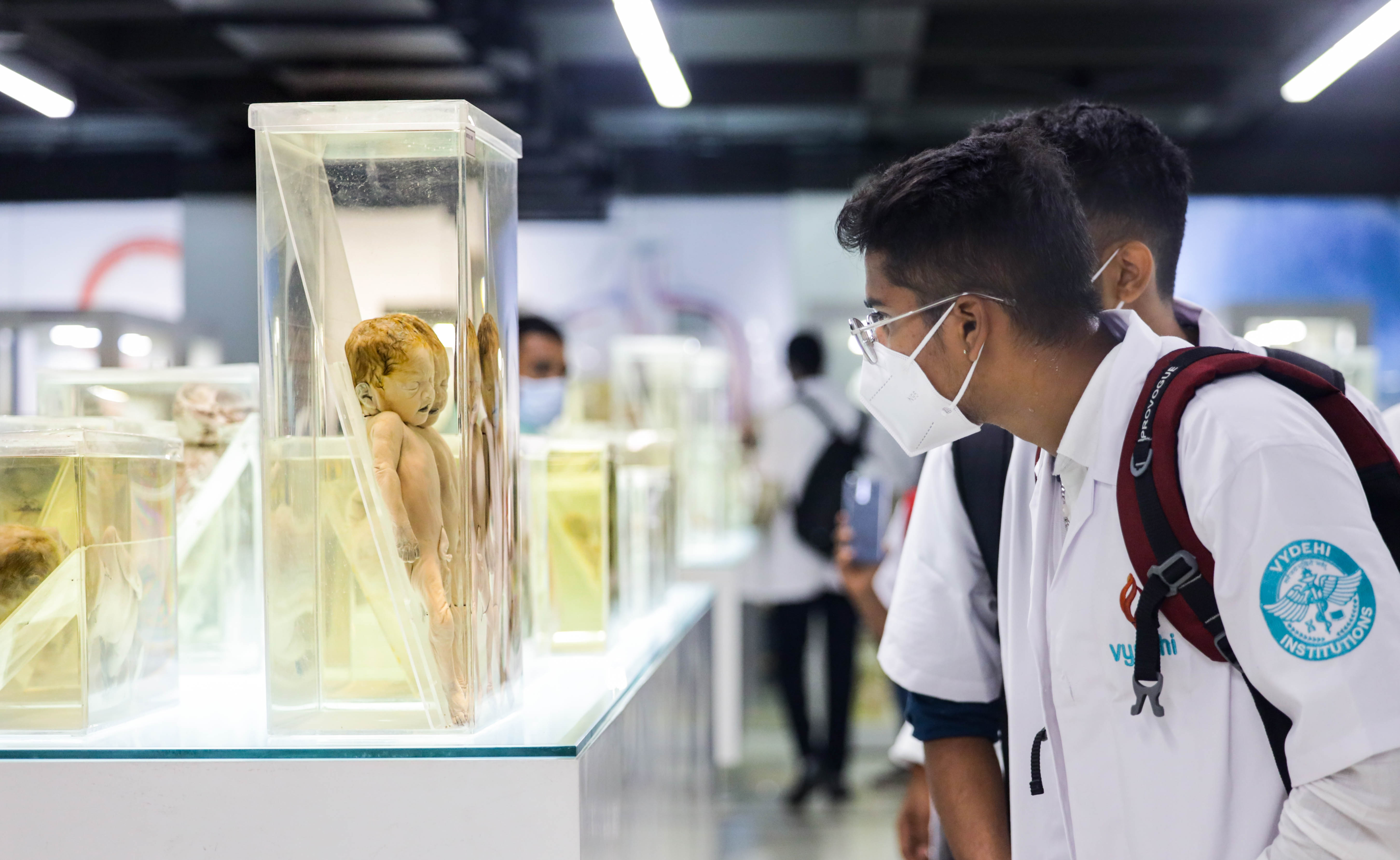
VIDA, is a medical museum in India

== VIDA ==
Ultra-Modern Museum using a blend of E-Platform & Regular specimens, Weapons, Charts & Photographs along with other exhibits. There are both E-Catalogues as well as hard copies for ready reference.

The museum contains HD displays, audio visual exhibits & computerized software driven facility for students and other visitors.

== Location ==
The multi-specialty Vydehi hospital is in a locality of Nallurahalli, Whitefield, Bengaluru.
