= Virtuous Retail =

Owner of shopping centres

- Company type: Private company
- Industry: Retail
- Founded: 2007
- Products: Commercial offices Shopping malls Hotels; Hospitality; Retail

Virtuous Retail South Asia (VRSA) owns and operates shopping centres across India in major cities like Chennai, Bengaluru, Surat, Amritsar and Nagpur. Their centres are designed with a focus on integrating the historical and cultural heritage of the surrounding community into their architecture and programming. These centers typically feature a diverse range of food and beverage options, retail and community spaces, but their scope extends beyond mere shopping experiences.

== History ==
Virtuous Retail was founded in 2007 by Xander Group to develop community-centric retail and mixed-use projects in India. In 2016, Xander partnered with APG to form a $450 million joint venture, with APG holding a majority stake of 77%. The joint venture company, Virtuous Retail South Asia, acquired three retail assets from a Xander-backed fund for ₹2,000 crore.

Since then, VRSA has expanded its portfolio through organic growth and acquisitions. In 2019, the company acquired two shopping malls from Tata Realty and Infrastructure Ltd for ₹700 crore. VRSA currently has a total of six operational malls and two under-construction projects in Thane and Delhi.

== See also ==
- VR Ambarsar
- VR Nagpur
- VR Bengaluru
- VR Chennai
