= VR Ambarsar =

Shopping mall in Amritsar, Punjab, India

- Location: Amritsar, Punjab, India
- Address: Plot No - C, Circular Road, Medical enclave
- Opened: 2013
- Developer: Tata Group (as Trilium)
- Owner: Virtuous Retail
- Num. of stores: 100+
- Floor area: 1 million
- Floors: 6
- Parking: Valet parking
- Website: vrambarsar.com

VR Ambarsar (previously known as Trilium Amritsar) is a flagship shopping centre of Virtuous Retail in Circular Road, Amritsar, Punjab, India and is the largest mall in the Indian state of Punjab. The mall is spread over 6 floors, and includes 100+ brands, 12+ dining options, and a 6-screen Inox multiplex.

The mall was developed by Tata Group and opened to the public in 2013 under the name Trilium Amritsar. However, the group sold the mall in December of 2019 for Rs. 700 Crore to Virtuous Retail which re-branded the mall as their flagship VR Ambarsar. The mall is spread over a gross sizeable area of 1 Million sqft making it one of the largest malls in the region.

== About ==
The mall was originally planned and constructed by Tata Reality and Infrastructure Limited (TRIL). The complex also hosts the 5-star Taj Swarna hotel owned by Tata Group. The mall was formally inaugurated by the chief minister of Punjab, Parkash Singh Badal in February 2013. Taj Swarna hotel was formally inaugurated in January 2017, which, according to the group, serves Amritsar and the adjoining cities of Jalandhar and Ludhiana.

VR Ambarsar is one of the few malls in India that is LEED compliant and earthquake resistant. The mall is spread over an area of 5.54 acres, making it Punjab's largest mall.

== Acquisition ==
Tata Group, the original developer of the mall, later sold the mall to Virtuous Retail in December 2019 for $100 Million (equivalent to Rs. 700 Crore). This was Virtuous Retail's 5th mall in India after Chennai, Bengaluru, Surat and Mohali. The group then re-branded the mall from Trilium Mall to its flagship brand, VR Ambarsar.

== Retail and lifestyle ==
Stores in the mall are all major key international and national brands across key retail, lifestyle and entertainment. The mall houses over 250 International brands in over 100 stores and hosts a 6-screen multiplex by Inox. The architecture of the mall consists of two identical blocks: Block A and Block B both of which are inter-connected to each other by aerobridges across multiple floors. Behind both blocks stands the Taj Swarna hotel . Apart from these, the mall hosts a food court with a seating capacity of over 800, hypermarket, departmental stores and family entertainment center.

== Events ==
List of notable events in the mall:

- Punjab Art Initiative (February 2026)
- Punjab Art Initiative (March 2025)
- Christmas Carnival (2025)
- MAD MAD SALE (2025)
- Drum Circle (2025)
- Lohri Celebrations (2025)
- Gurupurab Specials (November 2020)
- Punjabi Virsa (April 2016)
- Summer Fest (June 2015)
- Videocon Connect Contest (March 2015)
- Trilium Women of Now Awards in Association with 92.7 Big FM (March 2015)
- Drawing Competition (March 2015)
- Acting Workshop (January 2015)
- Khushiyan di Lohri (January 2015)
- SAM Event (August 2014)
- Summer Toon Fest (June 2014)
- The Pakistan Show (May 2014)
- Miss Amritsar 2013 Grand Finale (December 2013)
