= Whitefield, Bengaluru =

- Suburb
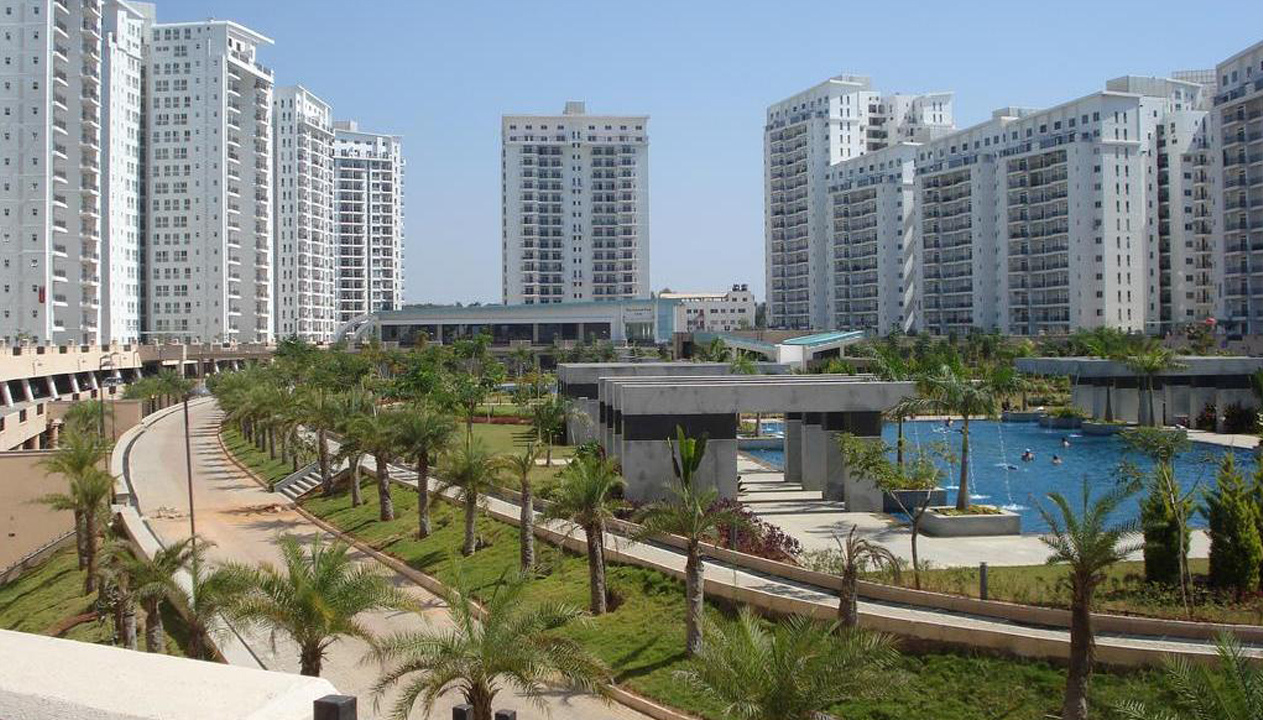
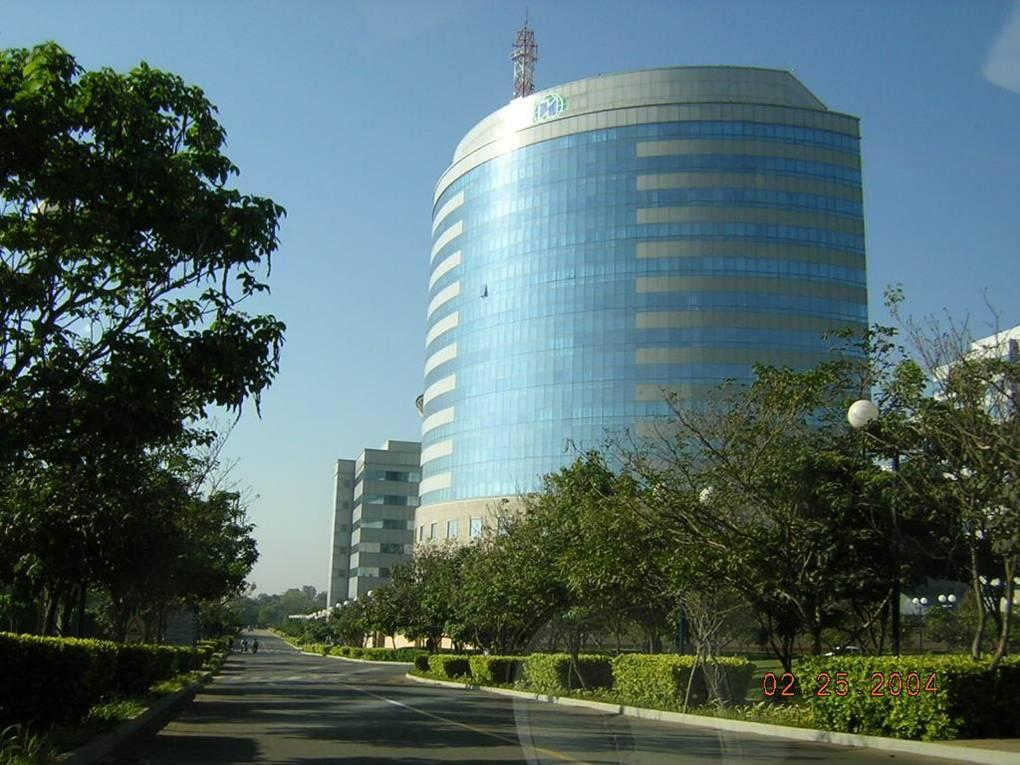
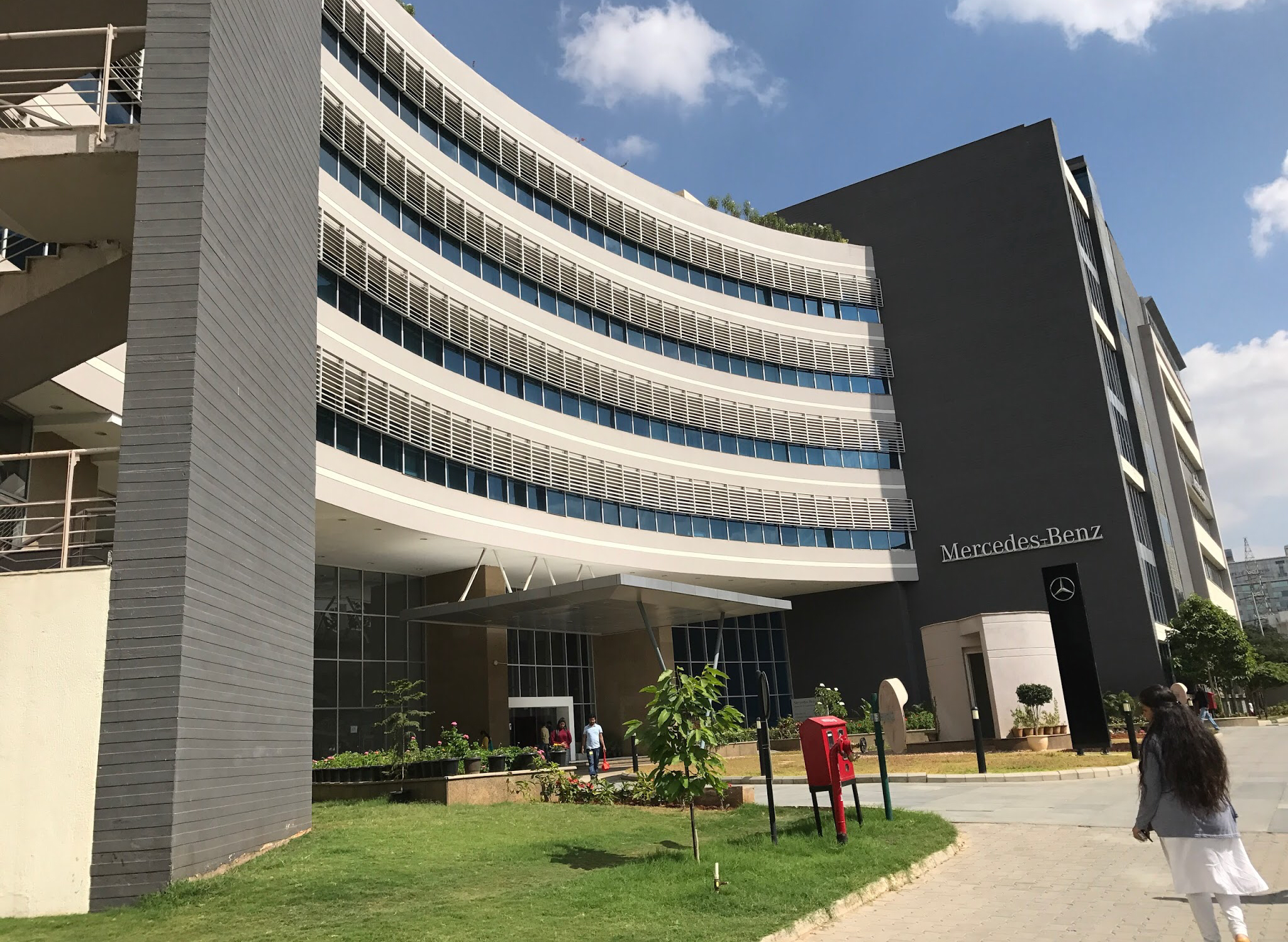
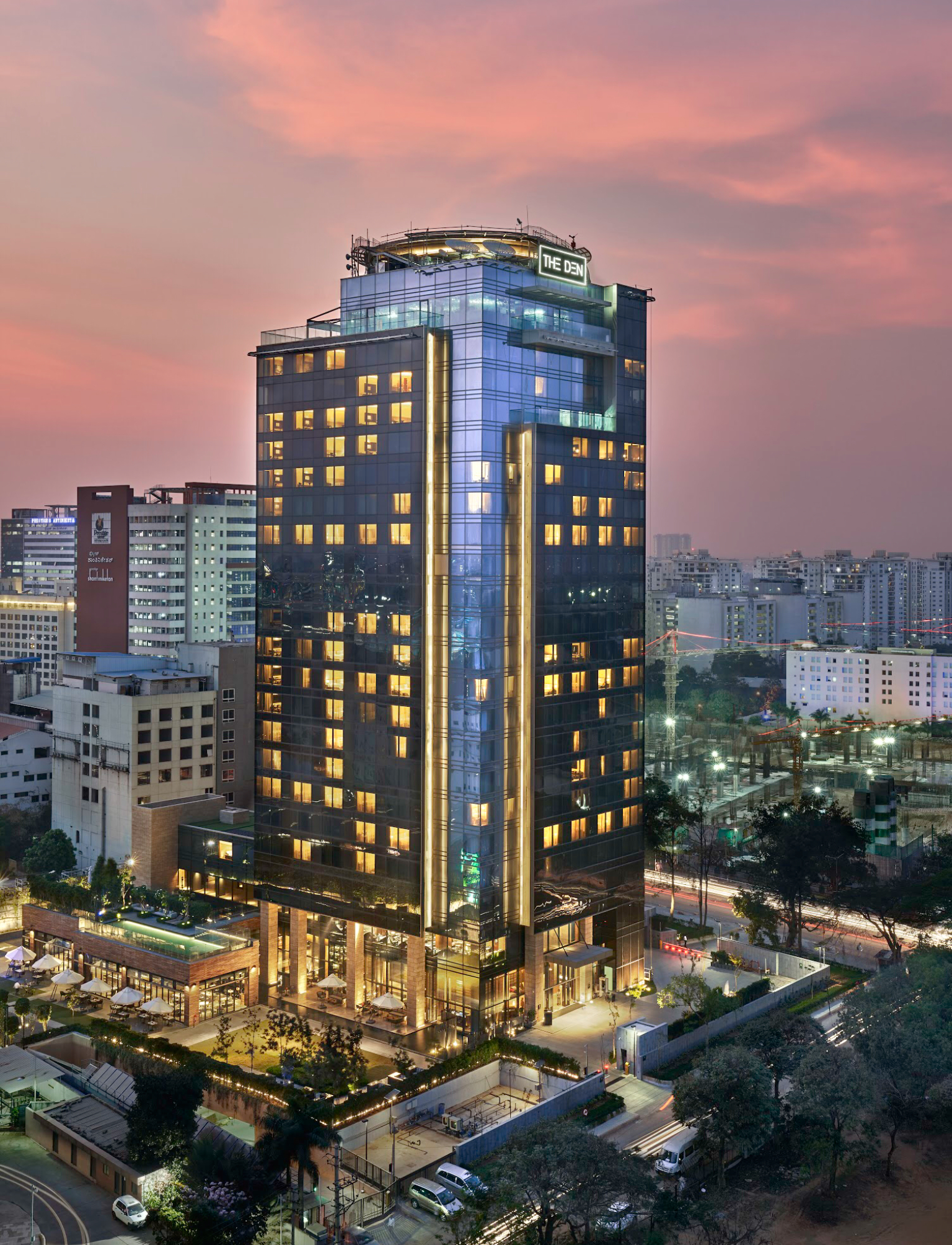
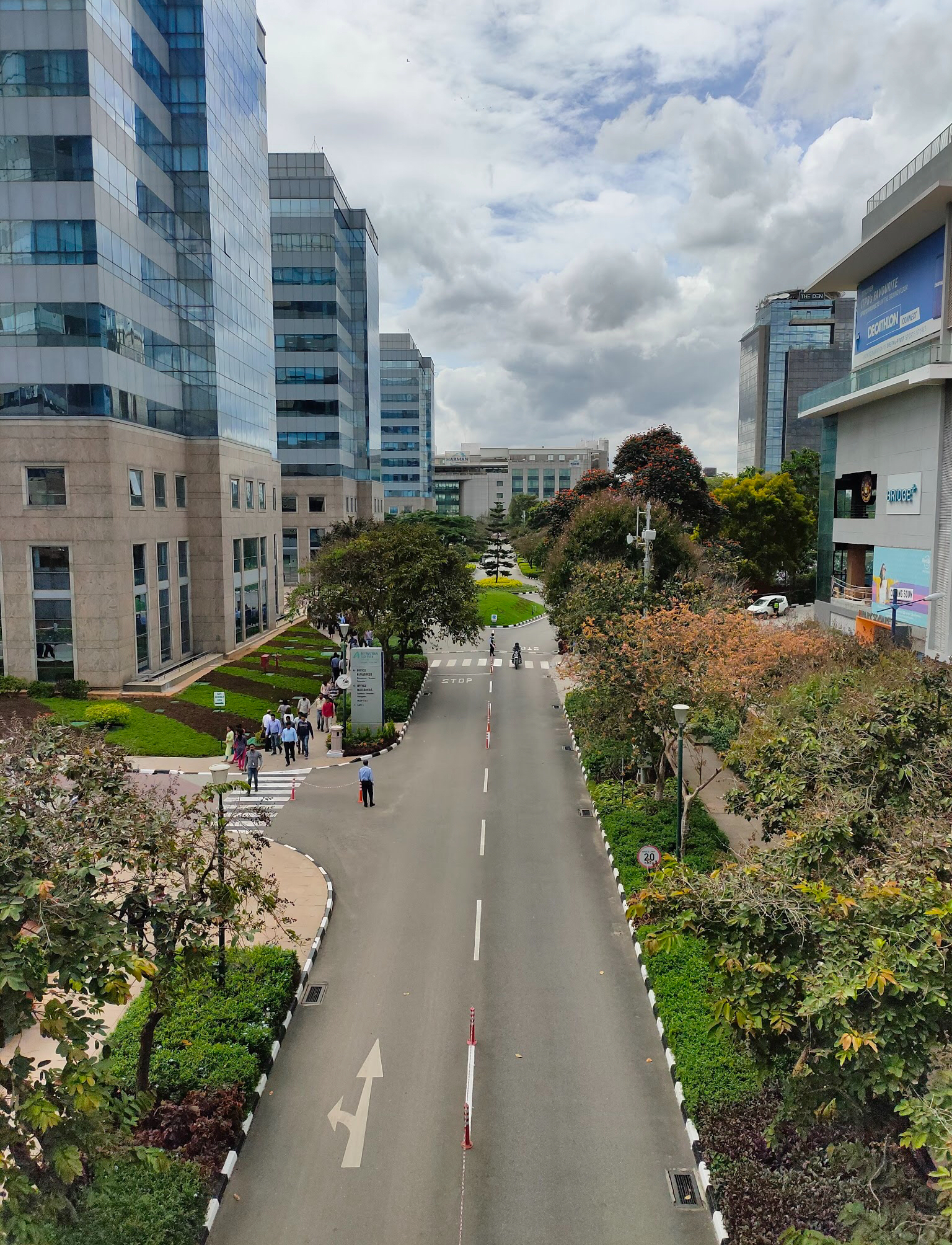
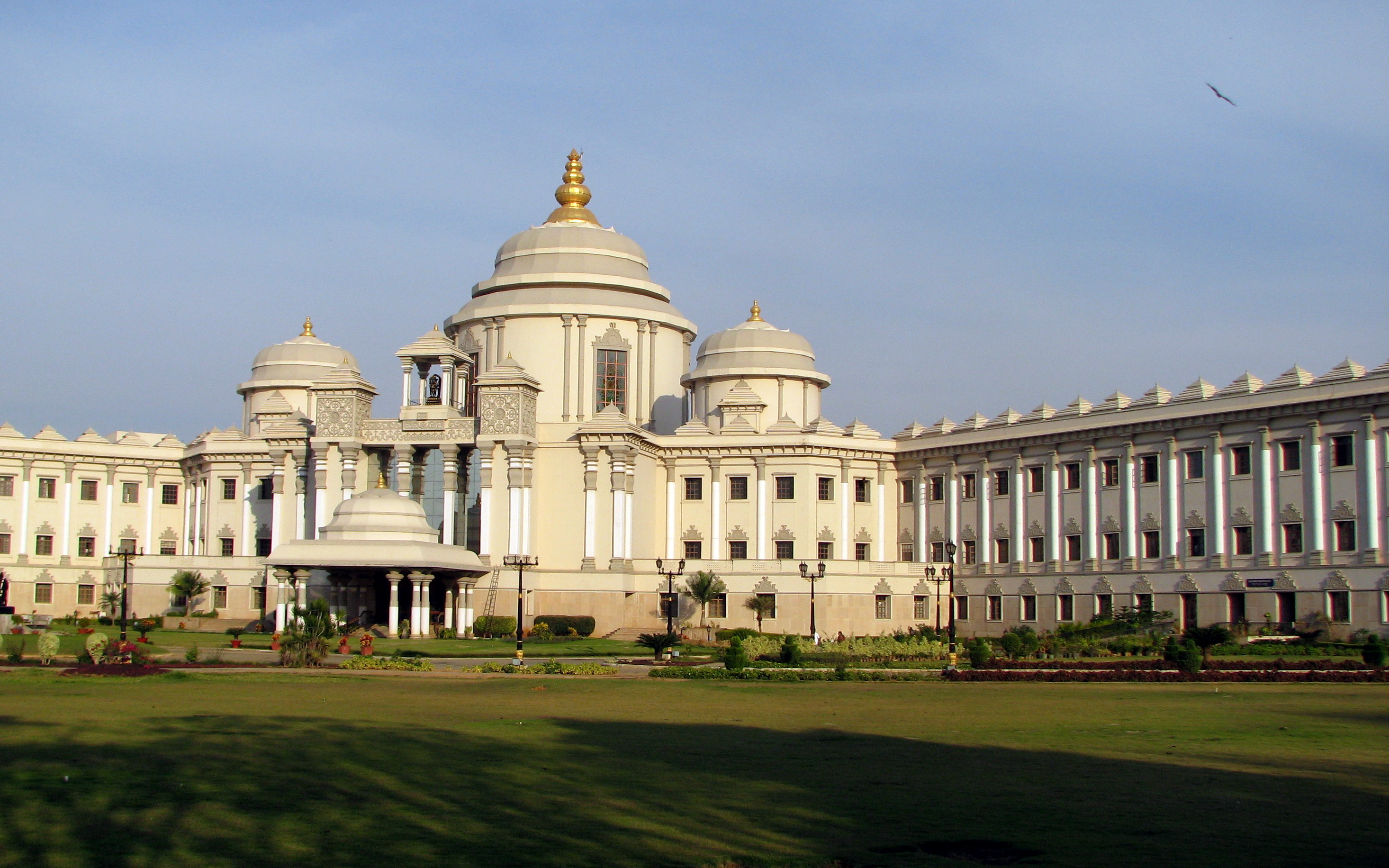
- (L–R from top) Prestige Shantiniketan, a building in ITPL, Mercedes-Benz R&D centre, The Den, Whitefield Road, Sathya Sai Hospital

- Location within Bengaluru
- Coordinates: 12.97°N 77.715°E
- Country: India
- State: Karnataka
- Metro: Bangalore

Government
  - Body: BBMP
  - Deputy Commissioner: Abdul Ahad

Languages
  - Official: Kannada
- Time zone: UTC+5:30 (IST)
- Postal Index Number: 560066,560067,560087
- Vehicle registration: KA-53- XX-XXXX

Whitefield is a neighborhood of Bengaluru, the capital city of the state of Karnataka, India. Established in 1882 as a settlement for the Eurasians and Anglo-Indians of Bengaluru, Whitefield remained a quaint little settlement at the eastern periphery of the city until the late 1990s, when the local IT boom turned it into a major suburb. It is now a major part of Greater Bengaluru. Whitefield is Bengaluru's first tech corridor to be connected by the Namma Metro, the city's metro system. The metro system's Purple Line, in particular, serves Whitefield.

The locality is named after David Emmanuel Starkenburgh White, founder of the European and Anglo-Indian Association.

== History ==
In 1882, Chamarajendra Wadiyar X, the Maharaja of the Kingdom of Mysore, granted 3,900 acres (16 km^{2}) of land to the Eurasian and Anglo-Indian Association for the establishment of agricultural settlements at Whitefield, which lay within his territory. The association was then about 170 strong, with a committee of 30 members. They were part of the formation of the only settlement in India that Europeans and Eurasians could call their own. Mr. David Emmanuel Starkenburgh White, the then president of the E&AI Association, took interest in it and helped in its advancement, which at the beginning was an uphill task.

In the first decade of the 1900s, there were about 45 houses: 18 were on the village site and the remainder were on farms throughout the settlement and contained about 2,000 acres (8.1 km^{2}) of land fit for cultivation. The number of residents in 1907 was 130. Lord Connemara, the then governor of Madras (1890) and General Sir Harry Prendergast, a British resident in Mysore, visited the settlement and lent support to the development of Whitefield. Subsequently, there were regular visits to Whitefield by the Bangalore District officials and high dignitaries from the Madras Presidency.

The settlement was 3 kilometres (1.9 mi) south of the Bangalore-Madras (now Chennai) line and a station was built. It led to the influx of residents and their families who worked at Kolar Gold Fields, about 50 kilometres (31 mi) (by train) to the east. It became convenient for those working at KGF to catch a train (running 3 to 4 times a day) and return to their families. There were frequent trains running to Bangalore 20 kilometres (12 mi) to the west (by train). Reaching the settlement from the railway station was possible only by writing a letter to Mrs. Hamilton (wife of a James Hamilton, the keeper of the Waverly Inn) who would arrange for a bullock cart trip for 8 annas.

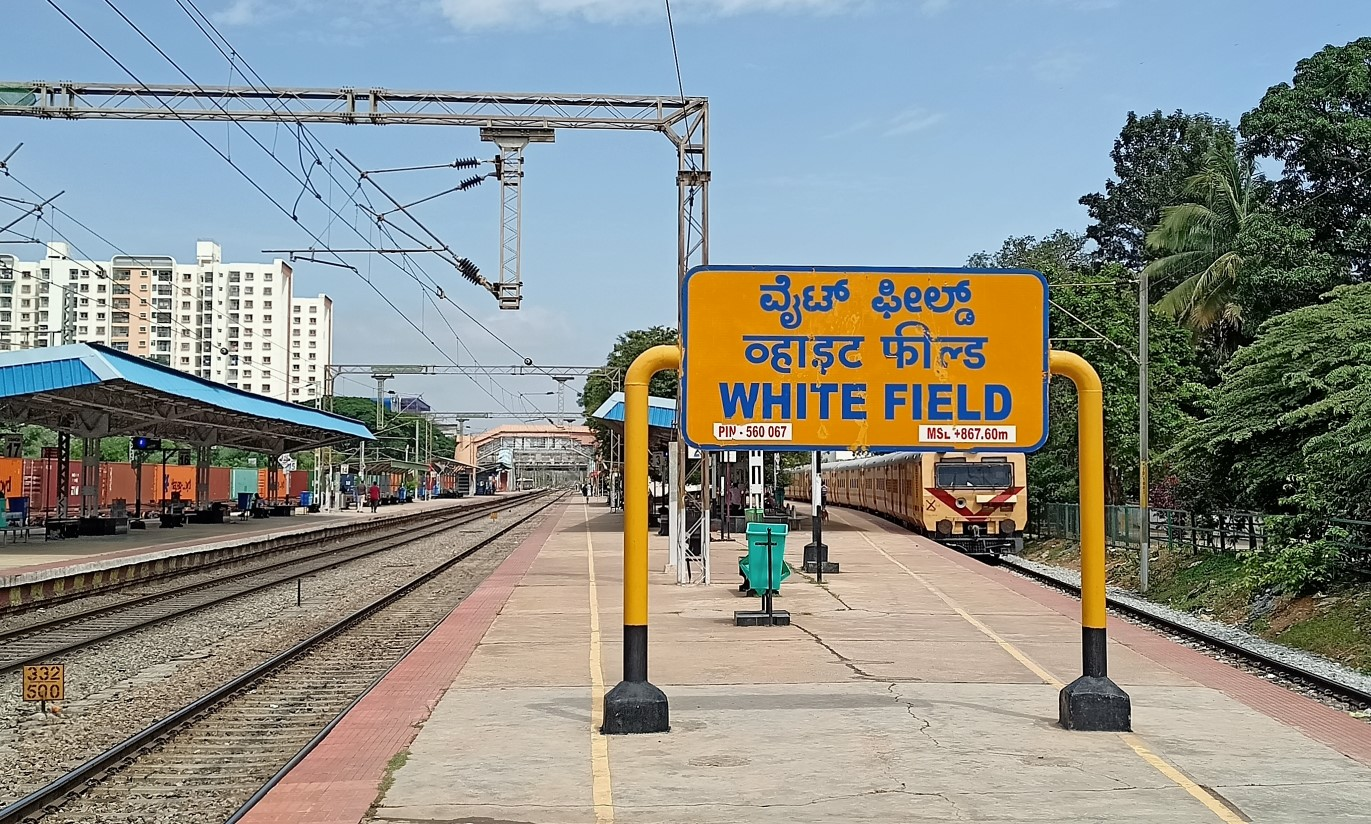
Whitefield railway station

Until the late 1990s, Whitefield was a small village. It has since become a major hub for the Indian technology industry. The Export Promotion Industrial Park (EPIP) at Whitefield is one of the country's first information technology parks—International Tech Park, Bengaluru (ITPB) which houses offices of many IT and ITES companies.

Whitefield is a part of Bengaluru which is administered by the Greater Bengaluru Authority.

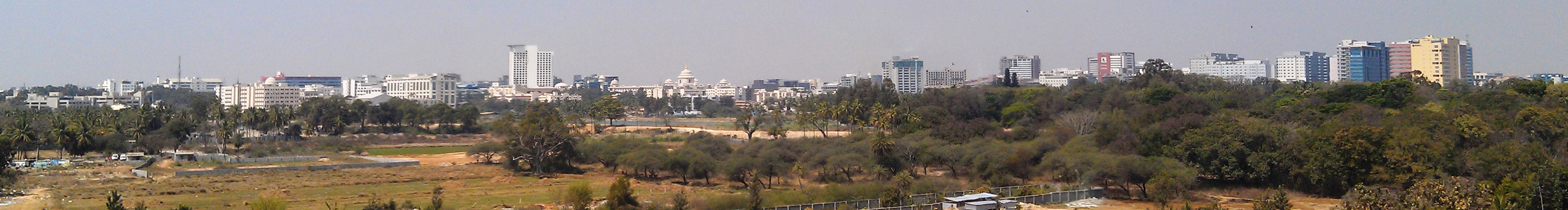
Panorama of Whitefield

== Infrastructure ==
Whitefield has started seeing a boom in residential construction since the latter half of 1990s and especially during 2002 and onwards.

There are two major four-lane roads connecting Bangalore city with Whitefield – Whitefield road via Mahadevapura and Varthur road (HAL Old Airport Road) via Marathahalli. Both roads intersect with Karnataka State highway 35 (SH 35) which runs north–south (Siddlaghatta in the north to Anekal in the south).

The Whitefield railway station is about 3 km north of the Whitefield Bus stop. It lies on the Bangalore-Chennai route and is double and electrified, the Krishnarajapura-Whitefield railway station section is slated to be converted to a quadruple line. The station is slated to become a junction with a new Whitefield-Kolar (53 km; 33 miles) line being laid. Neighbouring the Whitefield railway station is Brindavan, the ashram and winter residence of the Hindu spiritual leader Bhagawan Sri Sathya Sai Baba.

The Container Corporation of India (CONCOR) has a large inland container depot just off Whitefield road near ITPB.

Shopping malls like Nexus Whitefield (earlier called The Forum Neighborhood Mall), Phoenix Market City, VR Bengaluru, Ascendas Park Square Mall and Nexus Shantiniketan Mall are in the Whitefield area. It also houses the renowned super speciality hospital, Sri Sathya Sai Institute of Higher Medical Sciences, Whitefield, inaugurated by Bhagawan Sri Sathya Sai Baba on 19 January 2001, which offers all the medical services for free. Vydehi Institute of Medical Sciences and Research Centre is the other major super-speciality hospital in Whitefield.

Whitefield has extensive city bus connectivity with a wide range of services offered by BMTC. A Traffic and Transit Management Centre (TTMC) in EPIP is functional with schedules connecting it with most areas of the city.

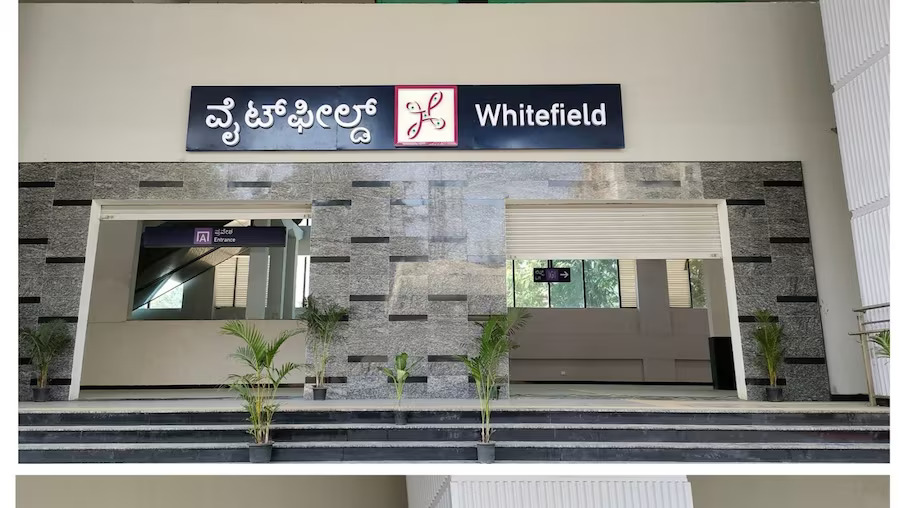
Whitefield metro station.

The much anticipated Namma Metro project started catering to Whitefield under Phase 2 from 26 March 2023. The Purple line has been extended to cover stations from Krishnarajapura to Whitefield (Kadugodi) covering 13 stations in between. This 13.71 km route was inaugurated by Prime Minister Narendra Modi on 25 March 2023.

Whitefield suffers from water shortages especially during summer months as the whole region relies almost entirely on groundwater. With the increase in housing and office space, the demand has been multiplying over the years, and groundwater depletion has been worsening alarmingly. BWSSB is supplying the region with water under the Cauvery Water Supply Scheme Stage IV, Phase II. BWSSB has been granted Rs. 10 billion for water projects in 2012 including supplying water to areas of Greater Bangalore which includes Whitefield.

== Geographic location ==
There are two main roads serving this area – Whitefield Road from Krishnarajapura and Whitefield Main Road (State Highway 35) from Varthur. From HAL Old Airport Road and Kundalahalli Gate is direct link between Central City and Whitefield. On 2 November 2020, Whitefield recorded its poorest air quality since the COVID lockdown. On 24 January 2021, residents petitioned the authorities to save the neighbouring Pattandur Agrahara Lake. They demanded removal of encroachments and rejuvenation of the water body by the city corporation. Most residnets live in Varthur, Thubhannahalli, AECS Layout, Kundalahalli Gate area, BEML layout and Nallurahalli, because they are located close to major tech companies.

== Food and leisure ==
There are multiple malls and food hotspots in and around the Whitefield area, some of them include –

- ITPL Mall (Park Square Mall)
- Nexus Shantiniketan Mall
- Phoenix MarketCity
- VR Bengaluru
- Nexus Whitefield Mall
- The Den (a luxury hotel/resort)

These malls host multiple restaurants that cater to a variety of cuisines – Regional Indian cuisines, Japanese, fast food, etc.

Additional prominent standalone restaurants in the area apart from the ones hosted in malls include:

- Stoners (burger and ice cream franchise)
- Windmills Craftworks (restaurant and micro-brewery)
- Pasta Street (Italian cuisine)
- A2B – Adyar Ananda Bhavan (South Indian restaurant franchise)

== Gallery ==
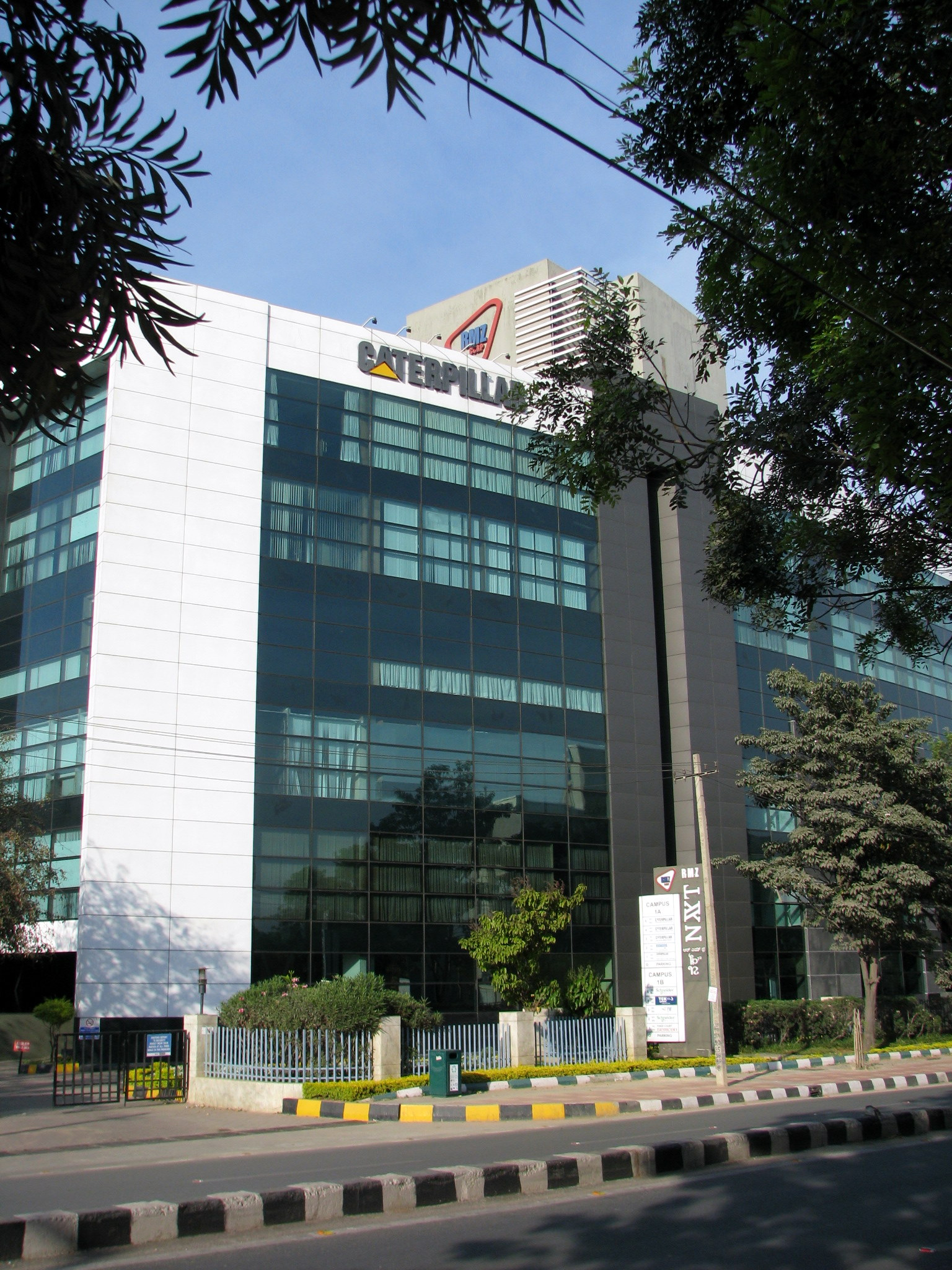
Caterpillar at the RMZ NXT Building

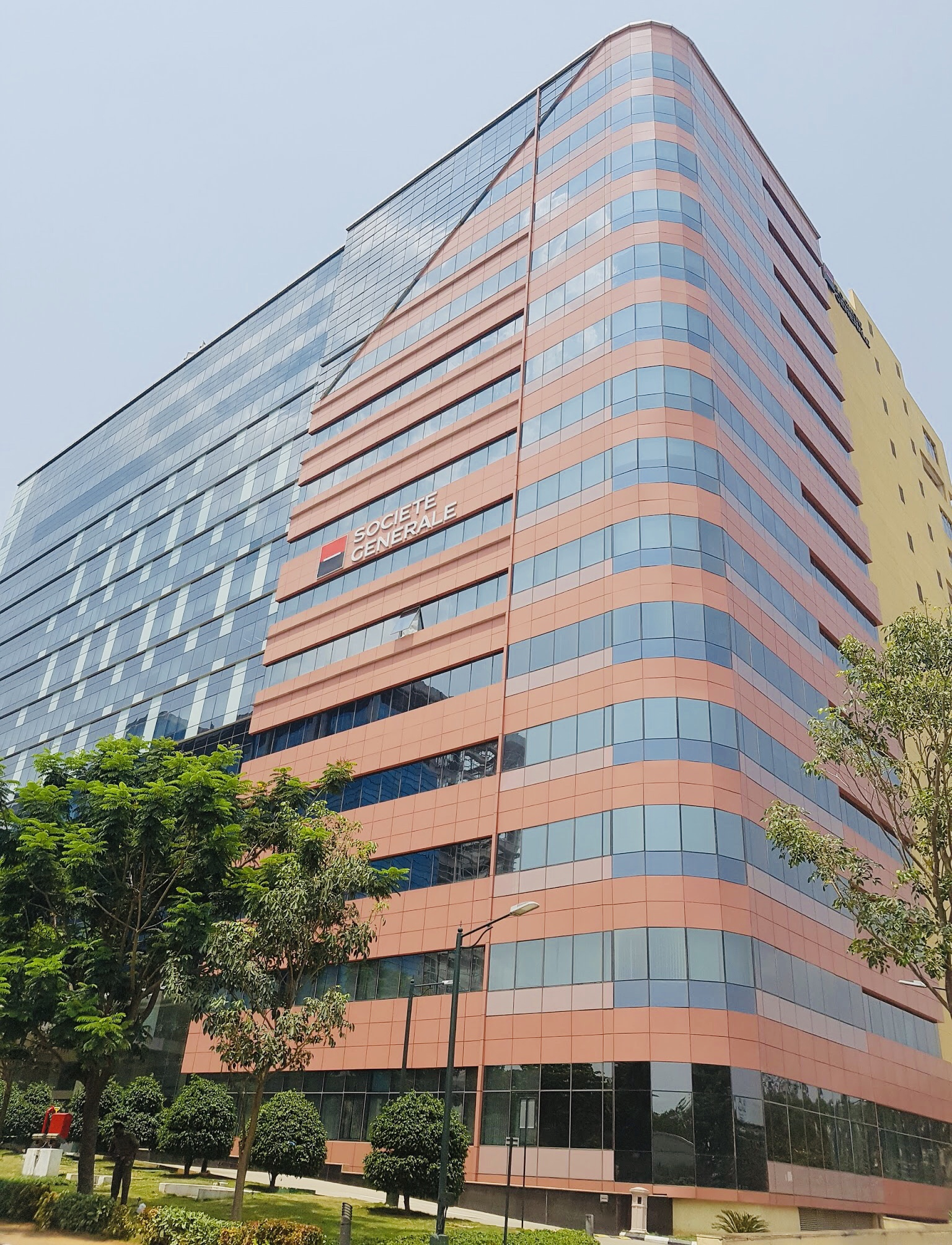
Société Générale Building at Whitefield

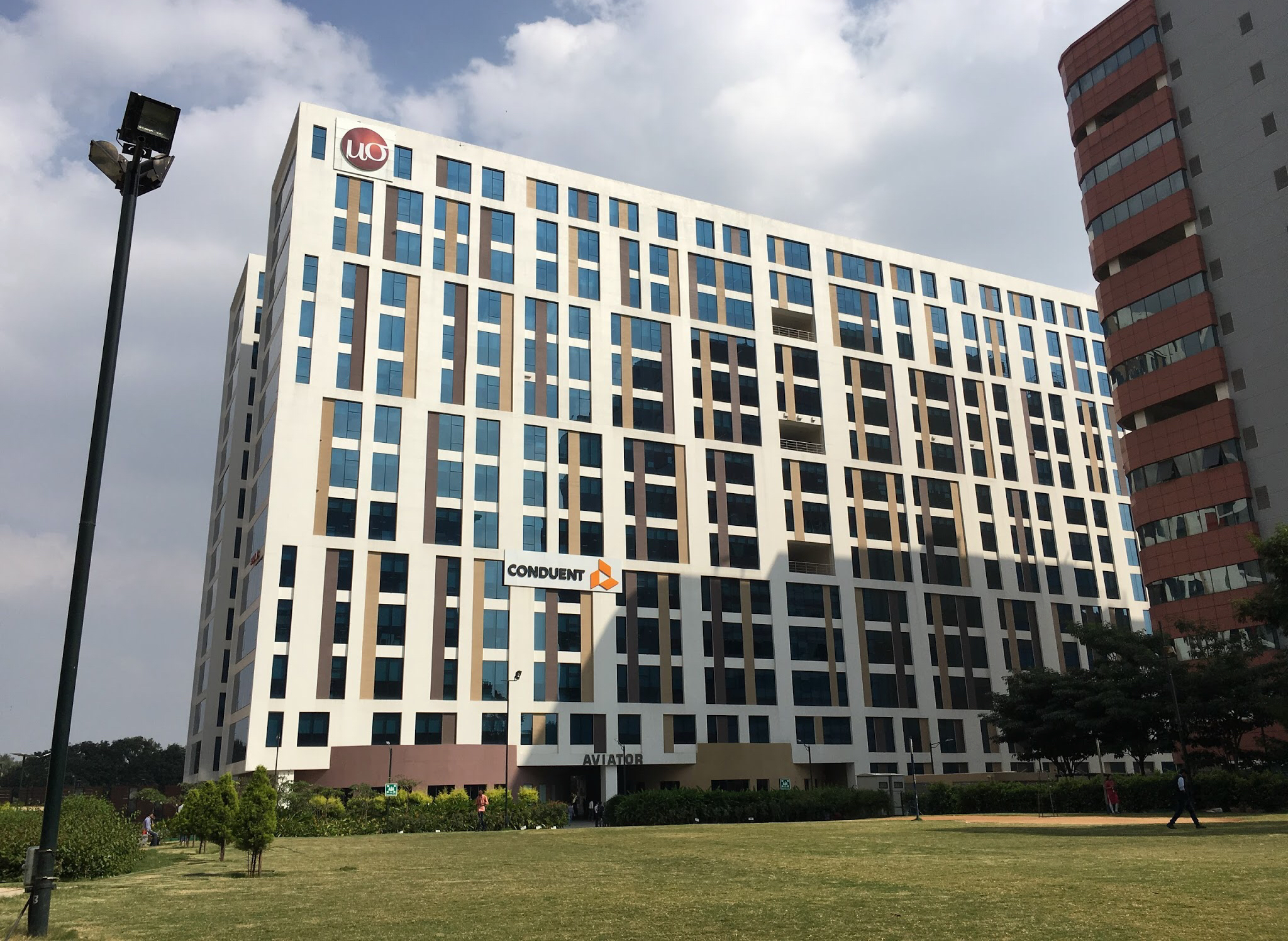
Aviator Building

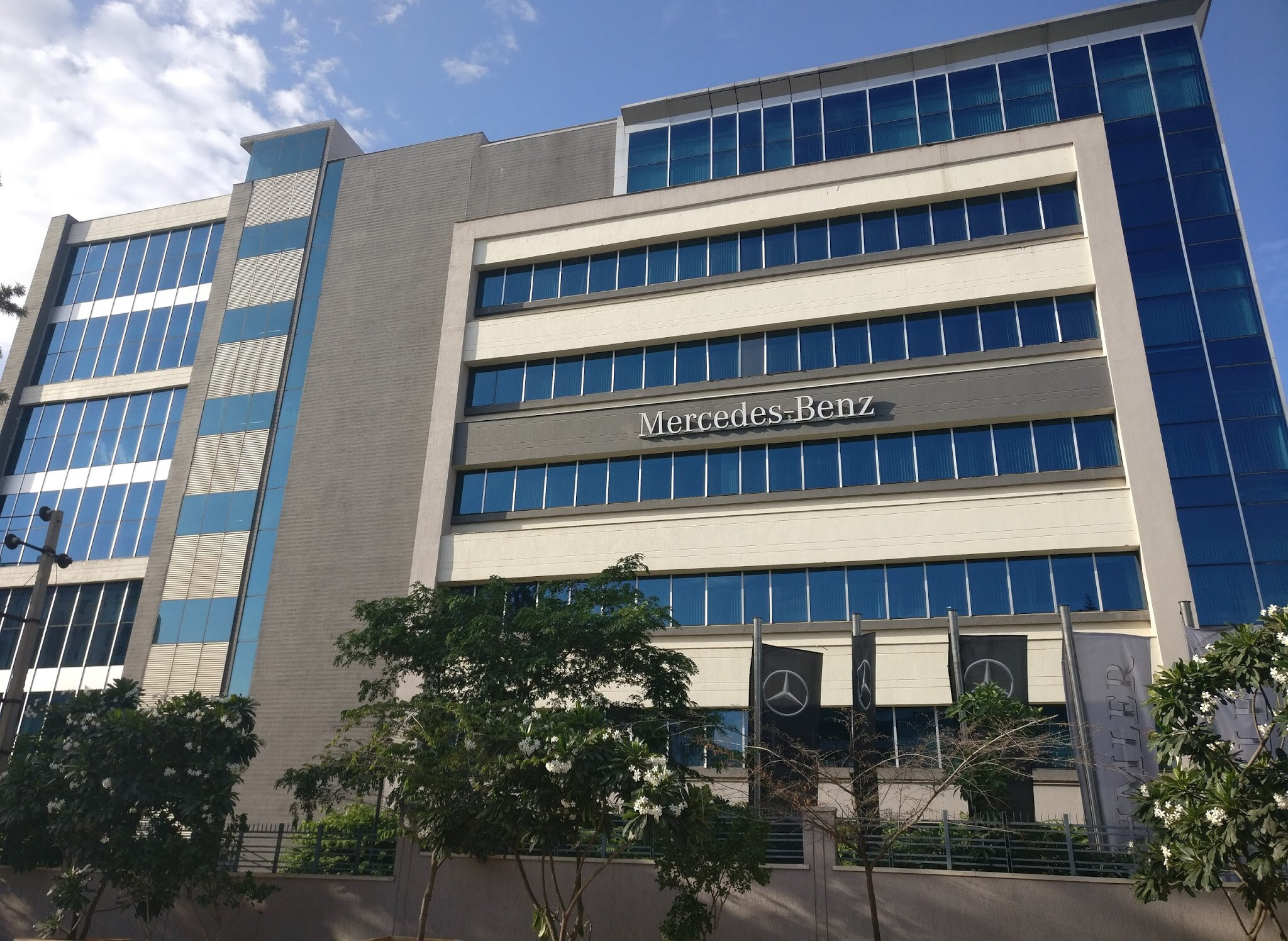
Mercedes-Benz Research and Development Centre

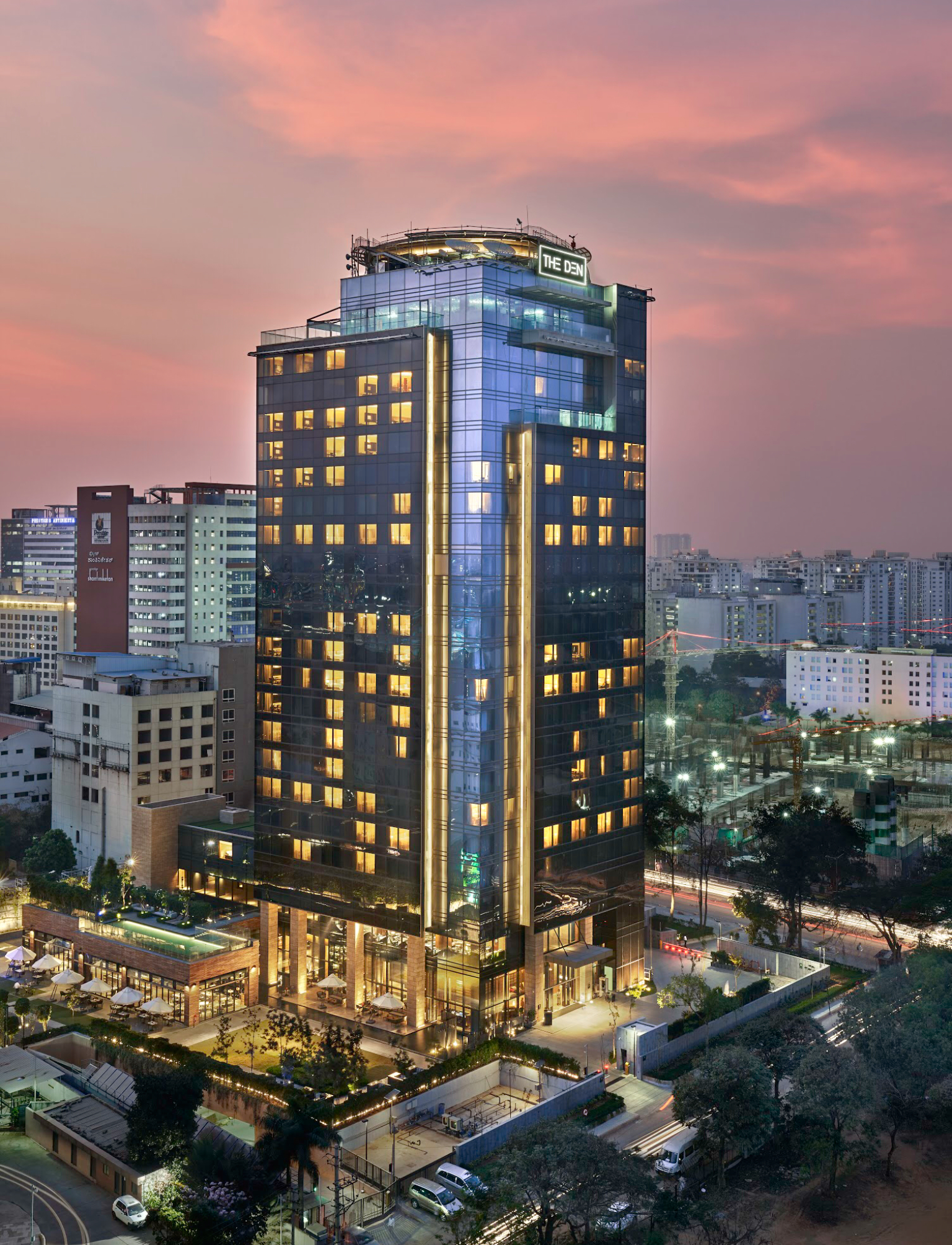
The Den Hotel

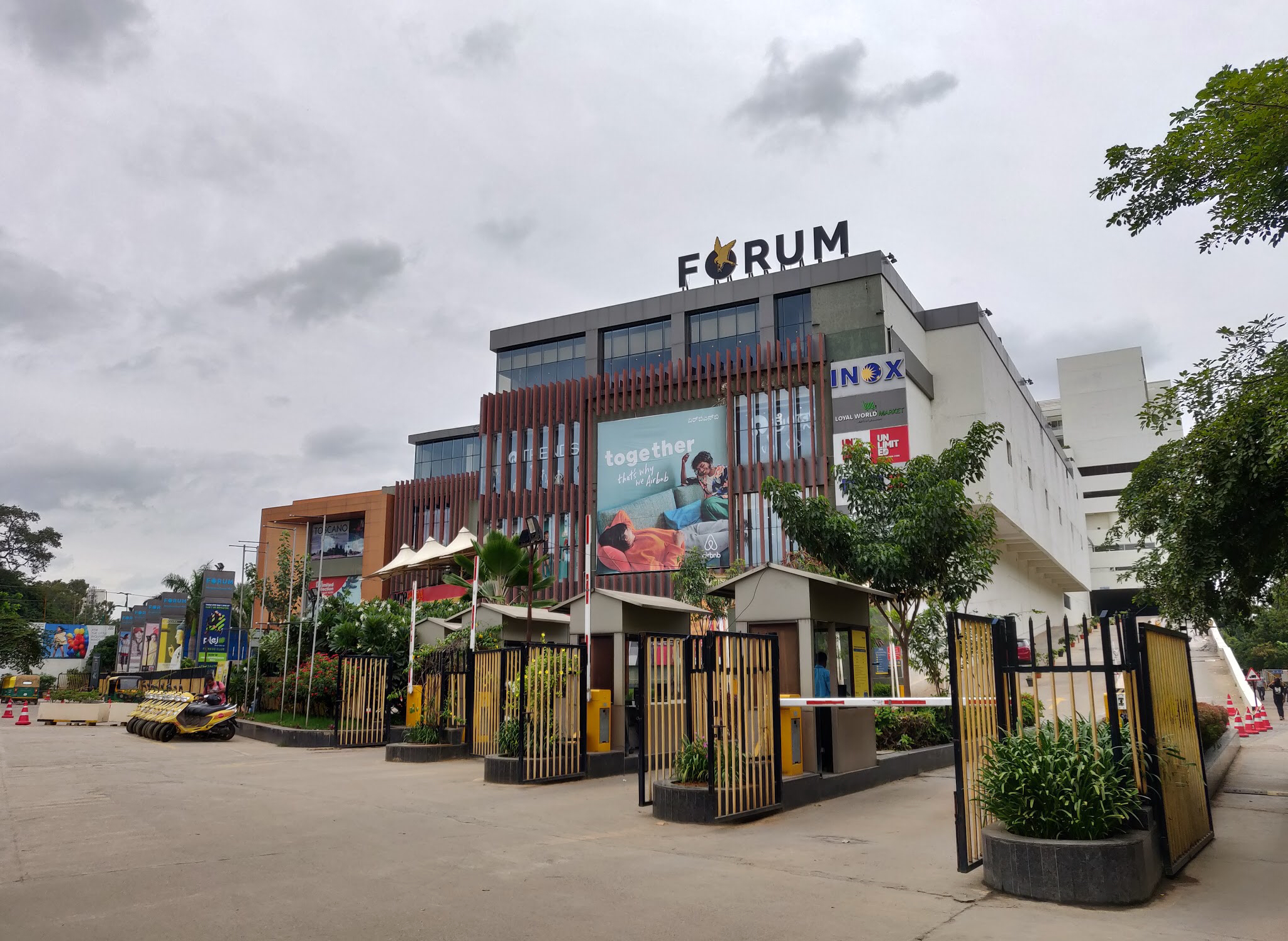
The Forum Value Mall (now the Nexus Whitefield Mall)

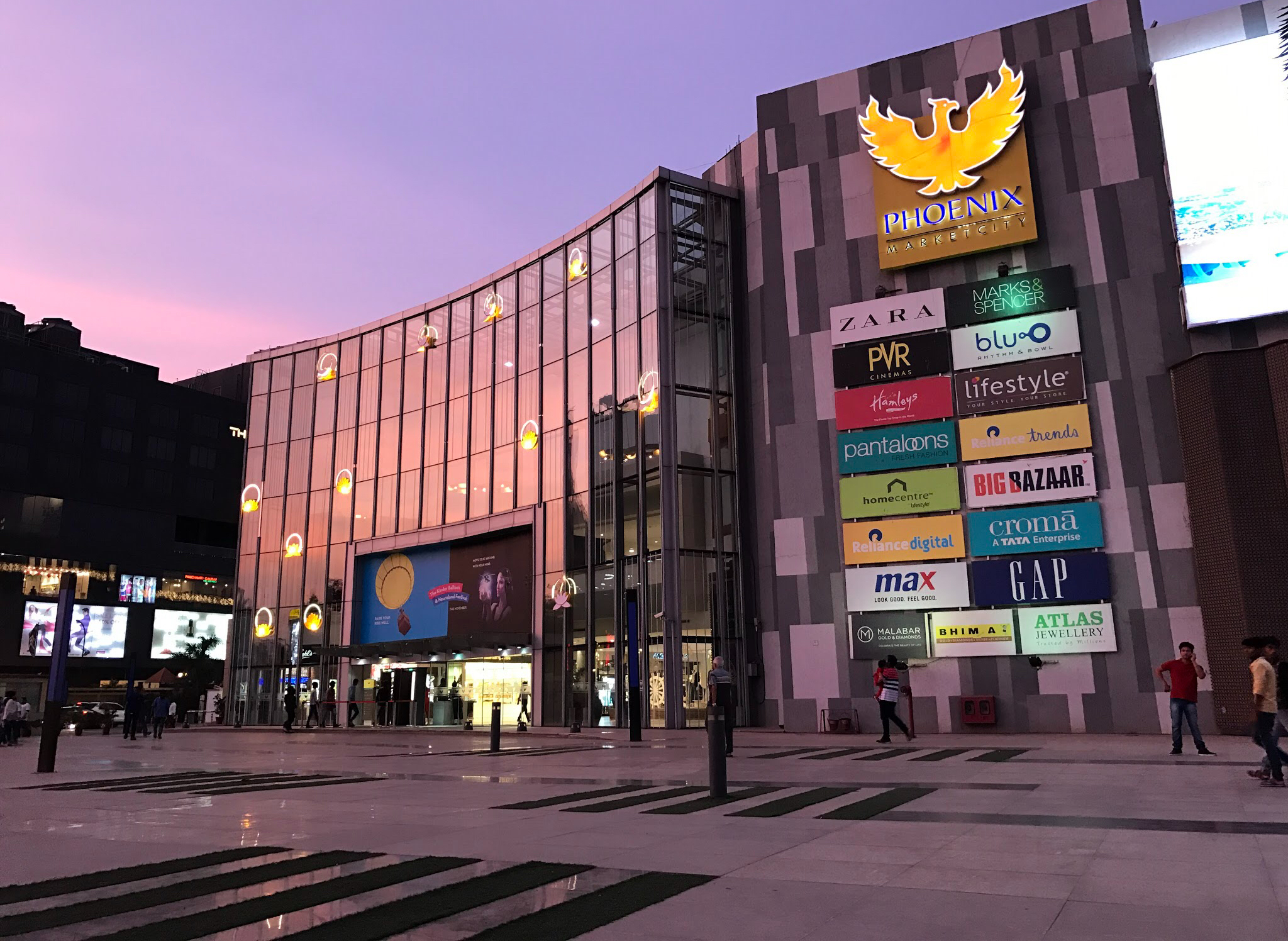
Phoenix MarketCity

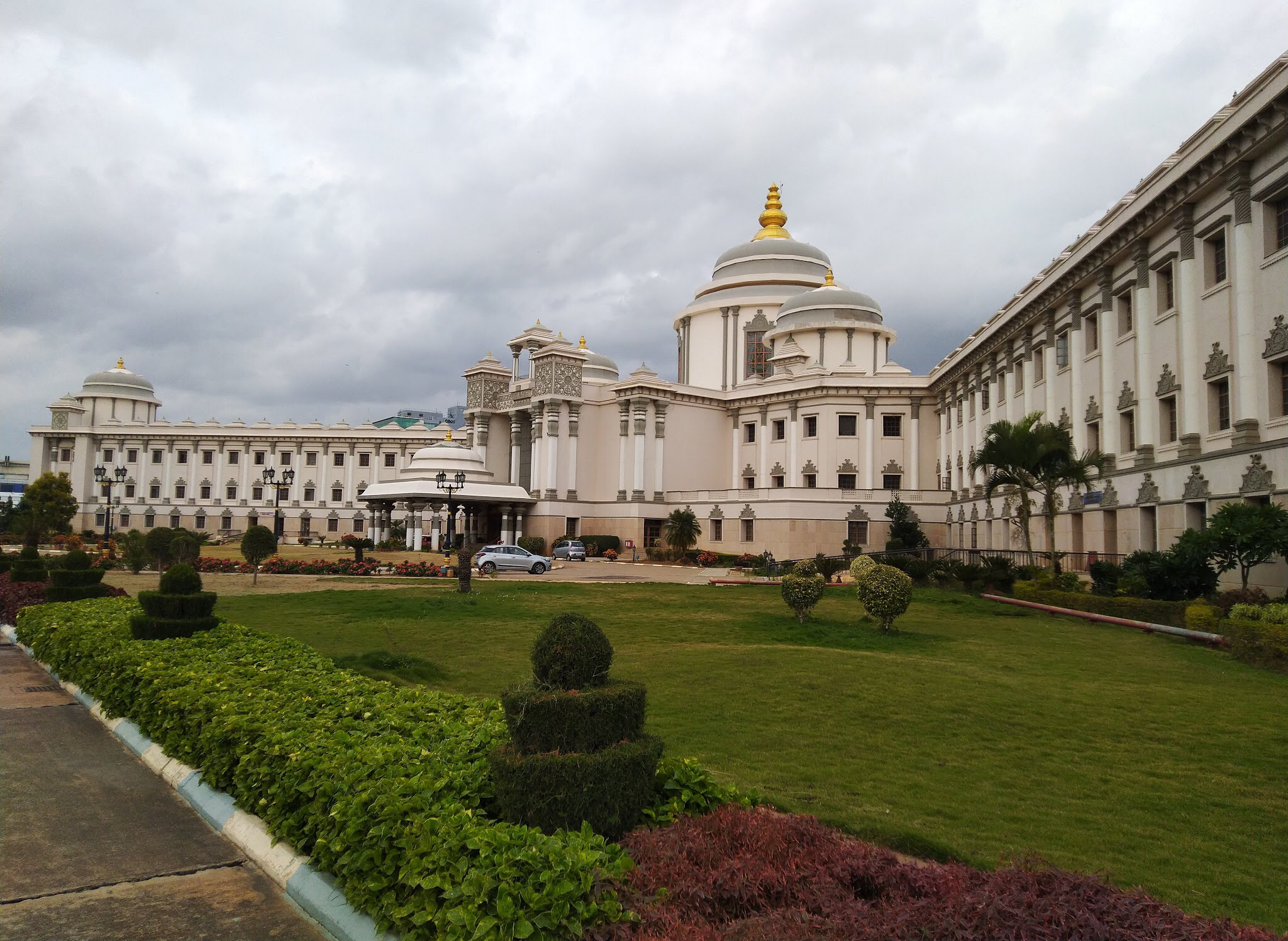
Sathya Sai Hospital

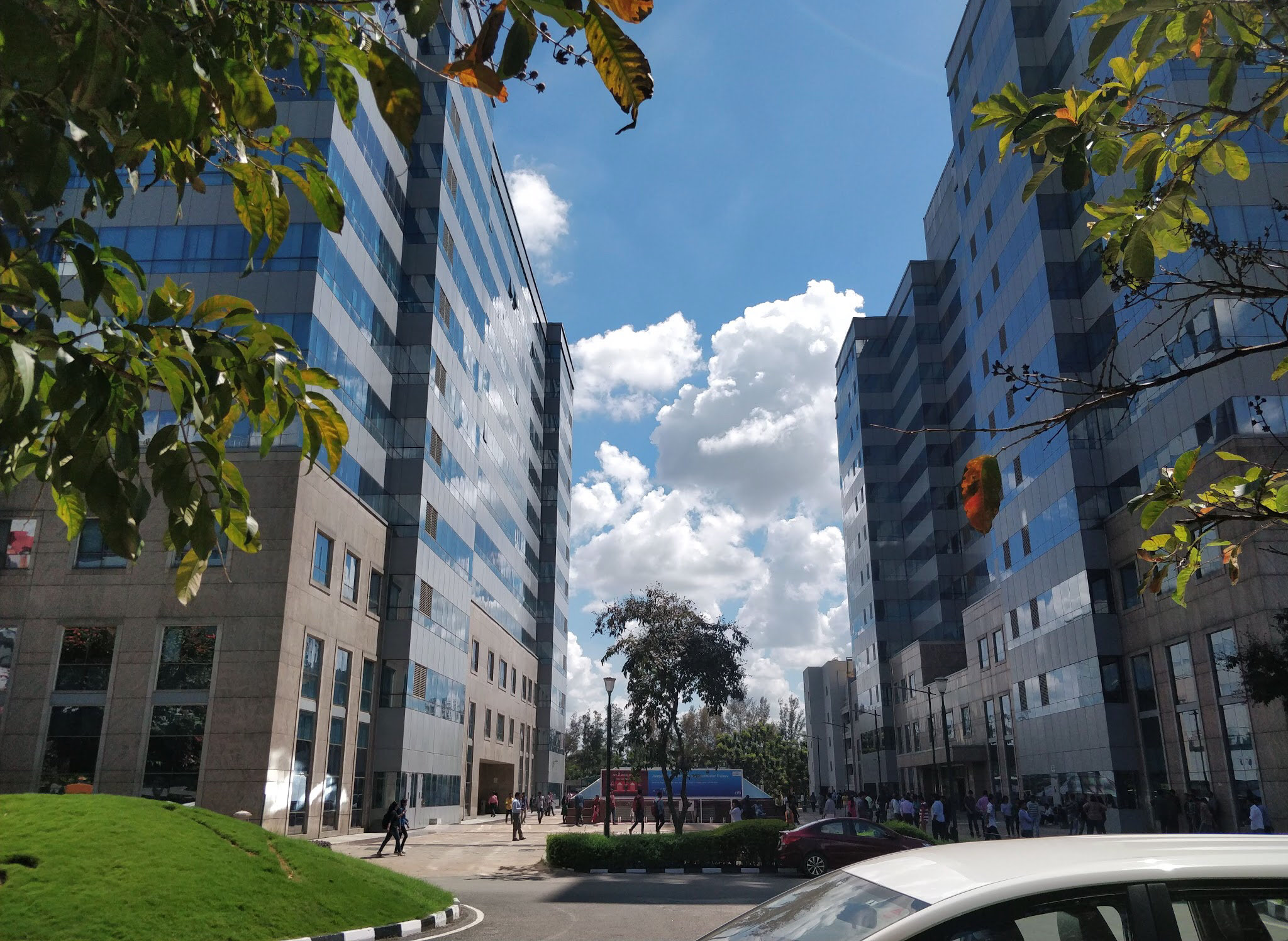
A building in ITPL

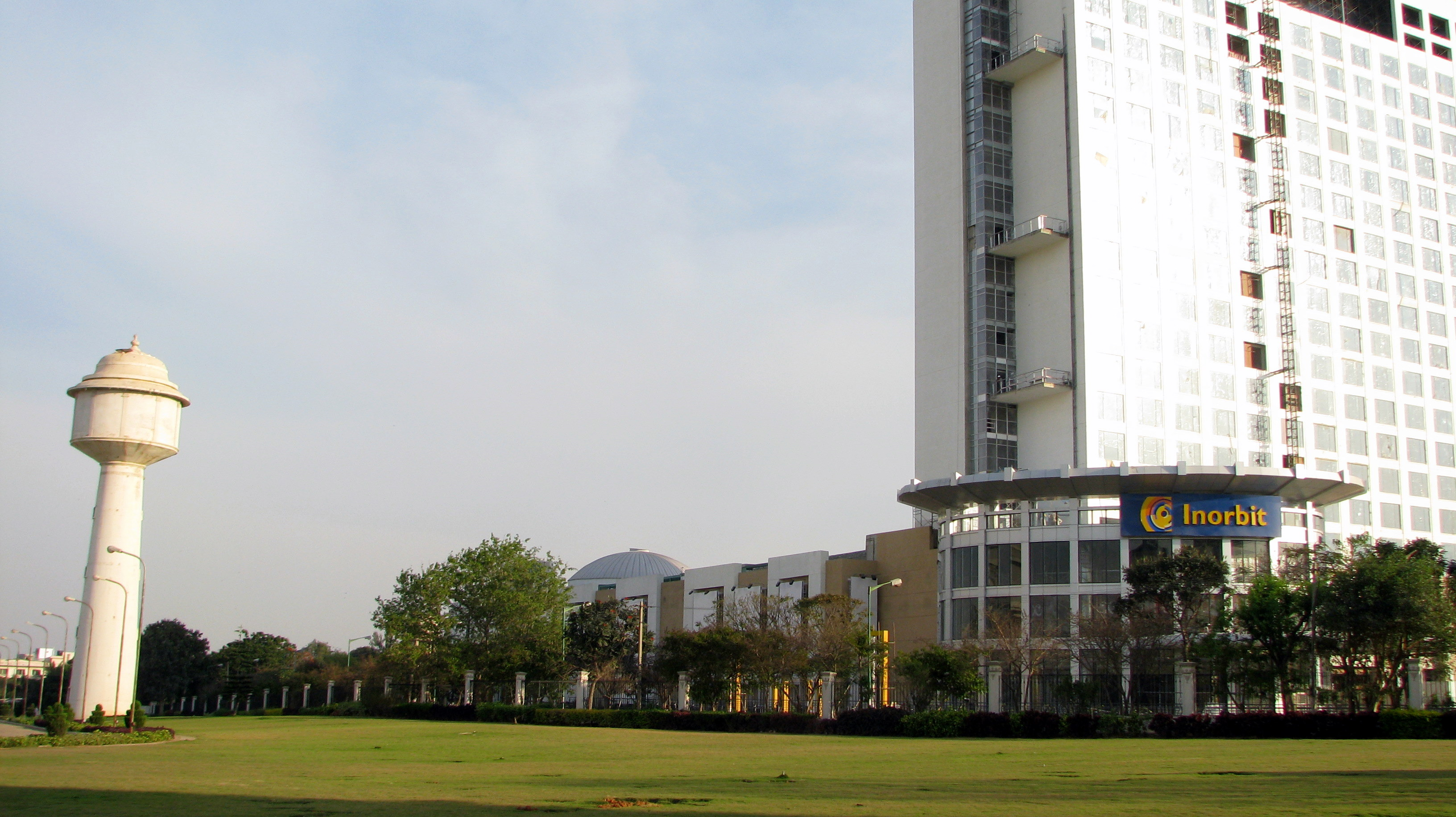
Inorbit Mall (defunct)
