= VR Chennai =

Shopping mall in Chennai, India

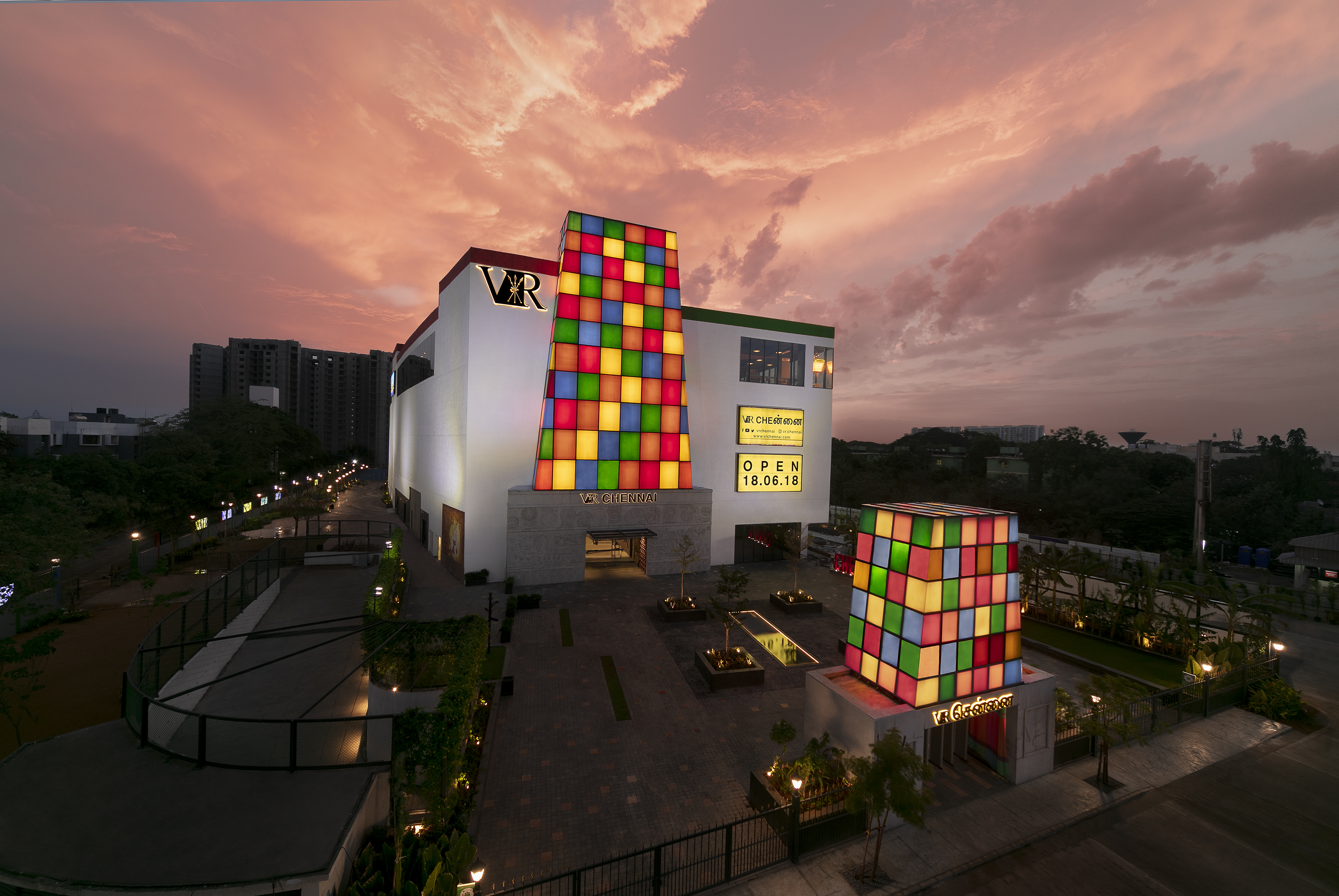
- Location: Jawaharlal Nehru Road, Anna Nagar, Chennai, India
- Coordinates: 13°04′46″N 80°11′44″E
- Opened: 18 June 2018; 8 years ago
- Developer: Virtuous Retail
- Manager: Virtuous Retail
- Owner: Virtuous Retail
- Num. of stores: 250+
- Floor area: 1,000,000 sq ft (93,000 m^{2})
- Floors: 6
- Website: vrchennai.com

VR Chennai is a shopping mall located on Jawaharlal Nehru Road in Anna Nagar West, Chennai, Tamil Nadu, India. This mall was opened to the public on 18 June 2018. It is one of the largest malls in Chennai by area, occupying 1,840,000 square feet (171,000 m^{2}) built-up area with 1,000,000 square feet (93,000 m^{2}) of retail space.

== History ==
VR Chennai was opened on 18 June 2018. The 10-screen PVR Cinemas multiplex was opened on 17 October 2018 at a cost of ₹ 400 million.

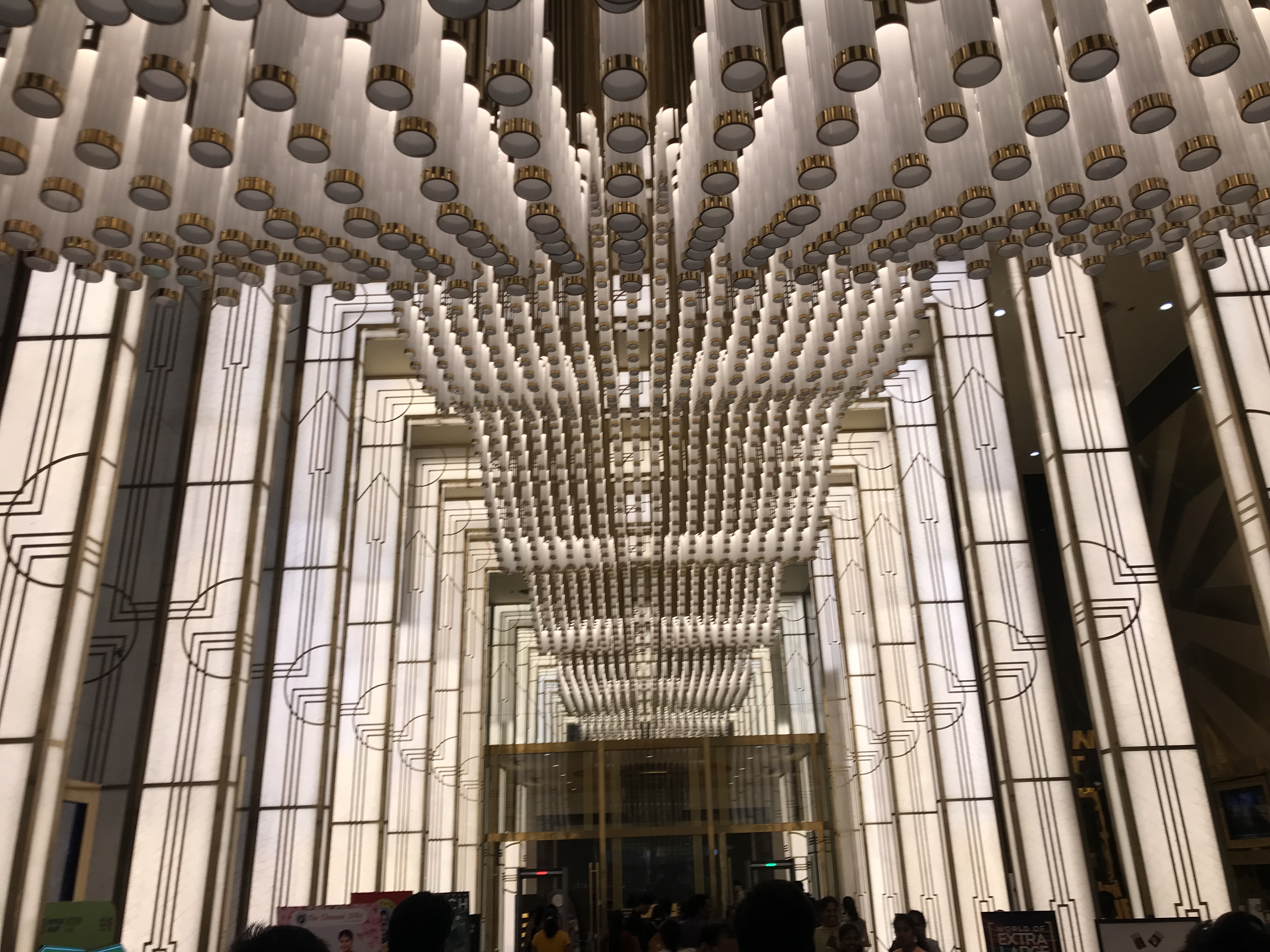
PVR Cinemas in VR Mall

== The design ==
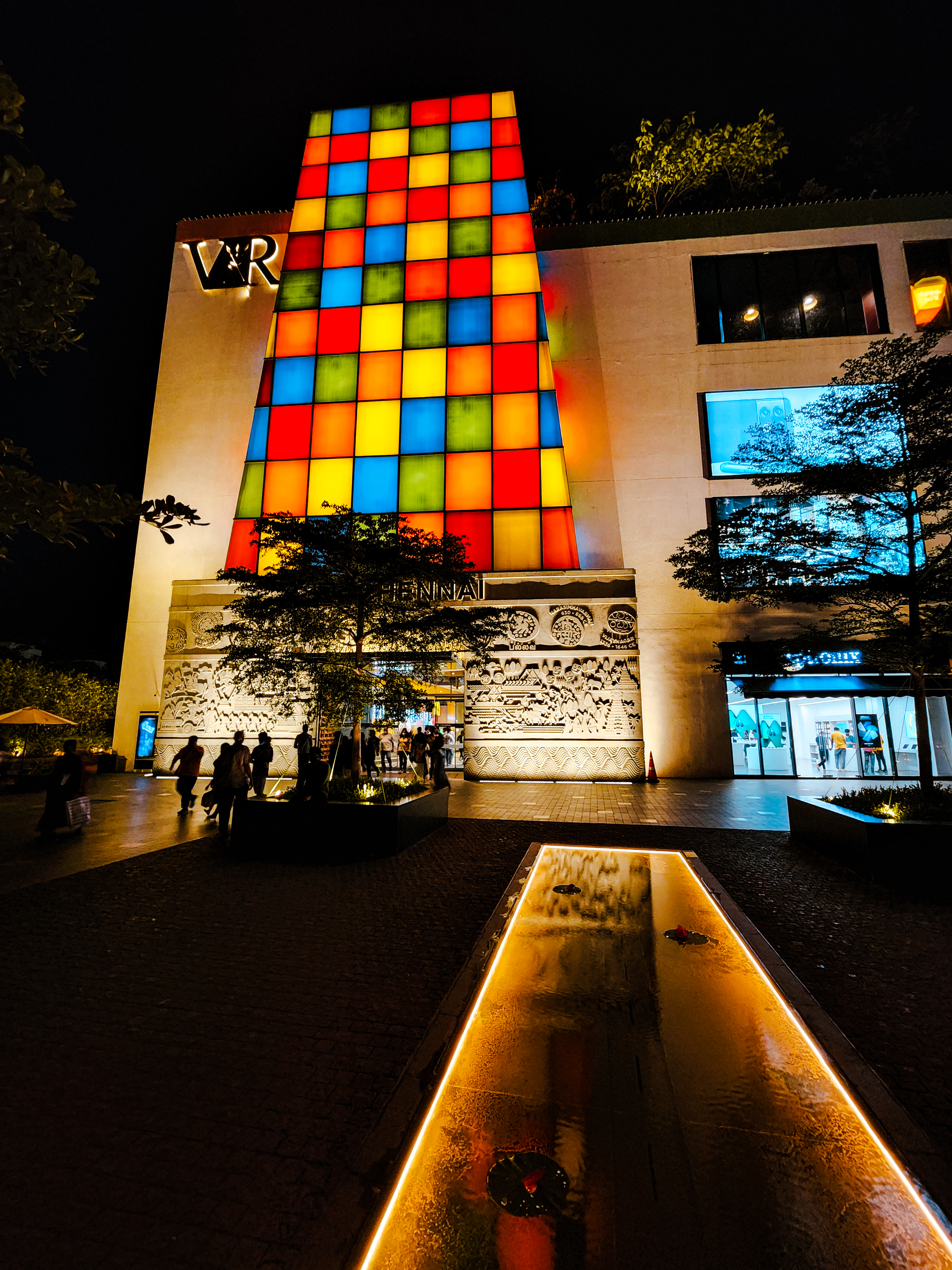
Front Facade of VR Chennai

The façade of the mall sports a multi-coloured design based on the traditional gopuram (South-Indian temple tower) inspired by Madras checks. Maps of the Chera, Chola and Pallava dynasties of South India and their distinct geographical spread are engraved on the walls at the entrance. The entrance also features a rectangular water path embellished with white lilies. The exterior walls of the façade sport symbolic carvings meant as cultural homage to the various dynasties from the Kadamba to the Vijayanagara.

The central portion consists of motifs themed on the Dashavatara, the ten avatars of Lord Vishnu in the form of murals and installations. A 400-kg bell has been installed at a height of 10 feet inside the entrance. Walls adorned with murals painted by artists from Cholamandal Artists' Village also feature inside the mall.

The 10-screen multiplex, PVR ICON, is finished in classic art deco and is spread over an area of 80,633 square feet. The design elements of the multiplex include lobby spaces with intricate marble flooring, mirrored ceilings, enamelled lighting, and antique gold accents.

== Shops and facilities ==
The mall has 240 retail stores. Other features of the mall include The Hive, a 50,000 square feet co-working space; ‘Madras House’, a multiple dining facility; a 10-screen multiplex theater and an event space; an open-air amphitheater; a boutique hotel; and services residences.

== Community initiatives ==
The mall plays host to live music on weekends at 6:00 pm. It also hosts a farmer's market every Sunday from 10 am to 7 pm.

== See also ==
- Shopping in Chennai
