= Ryuko Hira =

Indian investor and philanthropist (born 1948)

Padma Shri Ryuko Hira
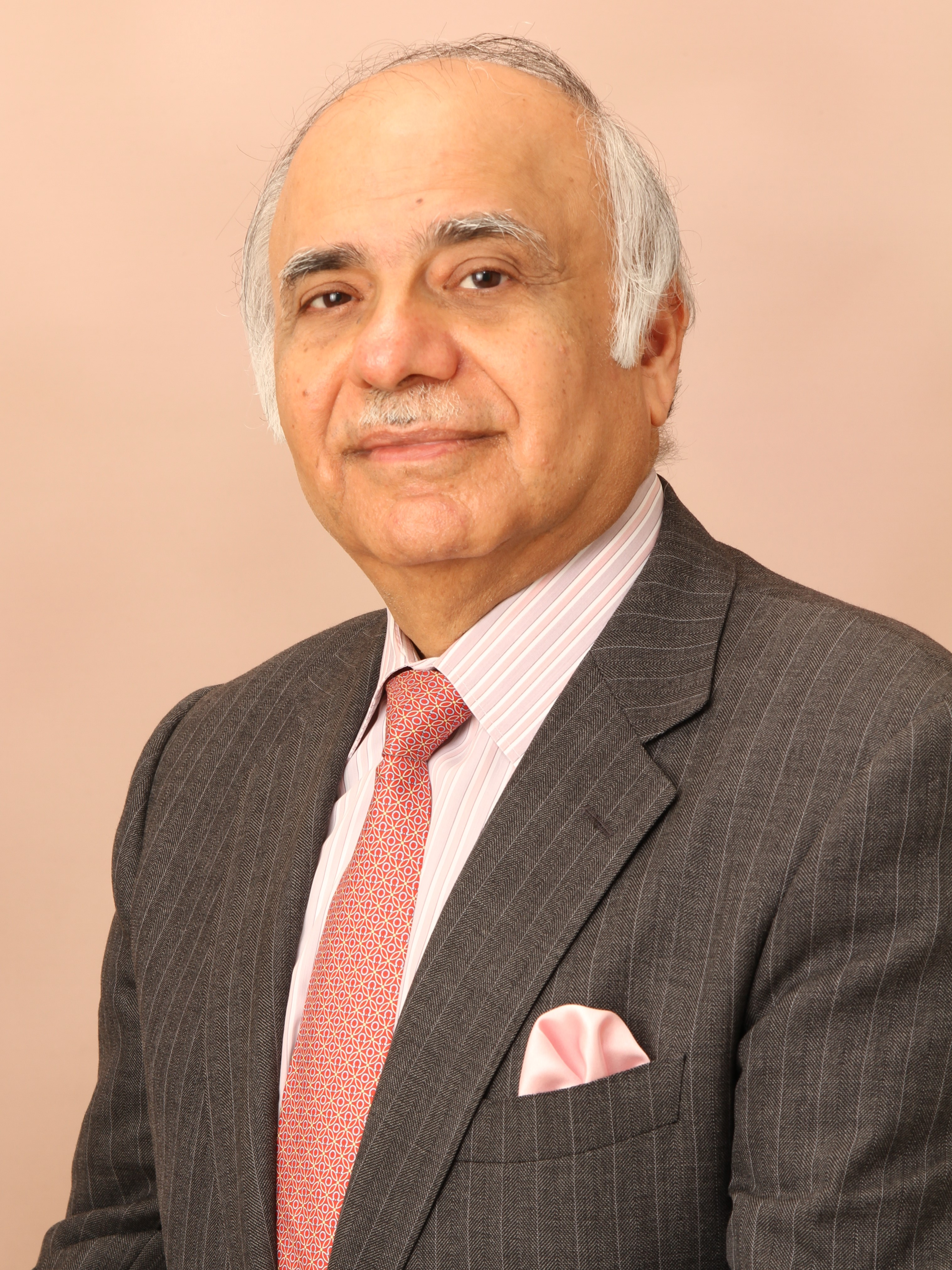
- Hira in 2016
- Born: Kamlesh Punjabi; 30 May 1948 (age 78); Jaipur, Rajasthan, India
- Education: Gemological Institute of America
- Occupations: Investor; philanthropist
- Organization: HMI Hotel Group
- Known for: Trade and Tourism; Indo-Japan Relations; Sri Sathya Sai Baba
- Awards: Padma Shri Award 2022, Pravasia Bharatiya Samman Award 2010
- Website: https://hmihotelgroup.com/corporate/

Ryuko Hira (born 30 May 1948) is an Indian-born businessman and philanthropist based in Japan. He serves as the president of the HMI Hotel Group and the Ora Group of companies.

According to a 2018 report in the Japan Times, he was described as one of the largest individual Indian investor in Japan at that time, with investments estimated at $2.5 billion, and a net worth exceeding $10 billion. In 2022, he was awarded the Padma Shri, India’s fourth-highest civilian honour, for his work in trade and industry. Indian and Japanese media have reported on his involvement in initiatives focused on economic relations between Japan and India.

== Early life ==
Ryuko Hira was born in Jaipur, Rajasthan, India, in the Parijat Bungalow, which today houses Dena Bank. He is the son of Seth Khemchand Kundamal Panjabi. He completed part of his schooling in Mumbai, attending Hill Grange High School and later Sitaram Prakash High School, where he obtained a Secondary School Certificate from the Maharashtra Board of Education. He graduated in gemology from the Gemological Institute of America (GIA) and attended a 12-week course at the Cornell University School of Hotel Administration. He later completed a Japanese language course at Sophia University in Tokyo, and then a diploma in character development from the Institute of Sathya Sai Education, Japan.

== Family Background ==
His family history can be traced back to the eighteenth century, with the birth of his great-grandfather Seth Jagatrai in Hyderabad, Sindh Province (in what is now West Pakistan). The family was also known as the Jagtianis due to having the same filial name. The family had a legacy of procuring jewels and ornaments from Muslim royalty like (Mugals), or Mirs.

The Jagtianis spread over four generations and expanded their trading business beyond the Indian subcontinent, into Southeast Asia and Japan. The Anglo-Japanese Alliance between 1902 and 1922 allowed 50 Indian companies to set up operations in Japan. Hira's uncle, Pitamberdas Merghraj, first partnered with the firm of Dalamals in Yokohama during this period. Merghraj then began independently exporting silk from Yokohama to British India in 1918. He was successful in this endeavour, and so was joined by other family members. Due to the Great Kanto Earthquake in 1923, his business was moved to Kobe. In Kobe, his new focus became buying cultivated corals which he would export to India.

While in Hong Kong, Hira learned about the business under the guidance of Chandiram. The business office moved to Tokyo in 1966. The family business was featured in a one-hour documentary special hosted by Japan's National Television, NHK, airing on 2 December 1984. After the death of Shri Chandiram in 1986, the family estate was divided, and Hira took over the real estate development portion. In the same year, Hira founded the Ora Group of Companies.

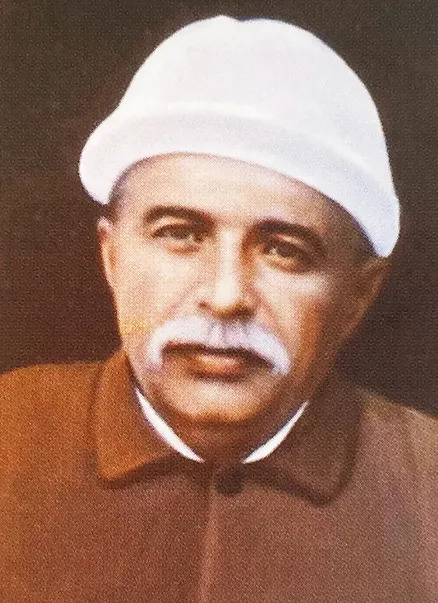
Seth Kundamal Chandumal Panjabi in 1890. Hira's grandfather was the founder of V. Kundamal Chandumal Jewellers.

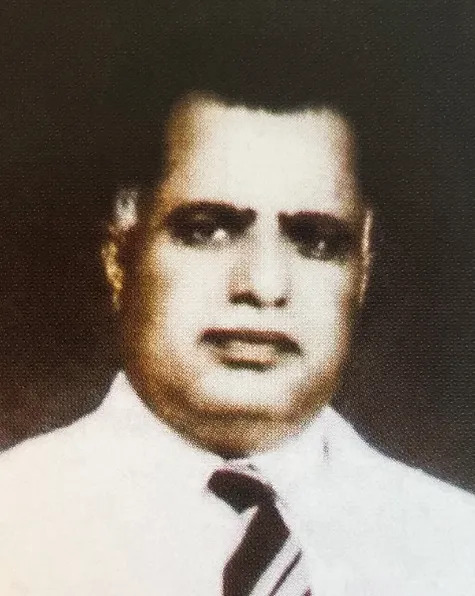
Seth Khemnchand Kundamal Panjabi in the 1960s. Hira's father.

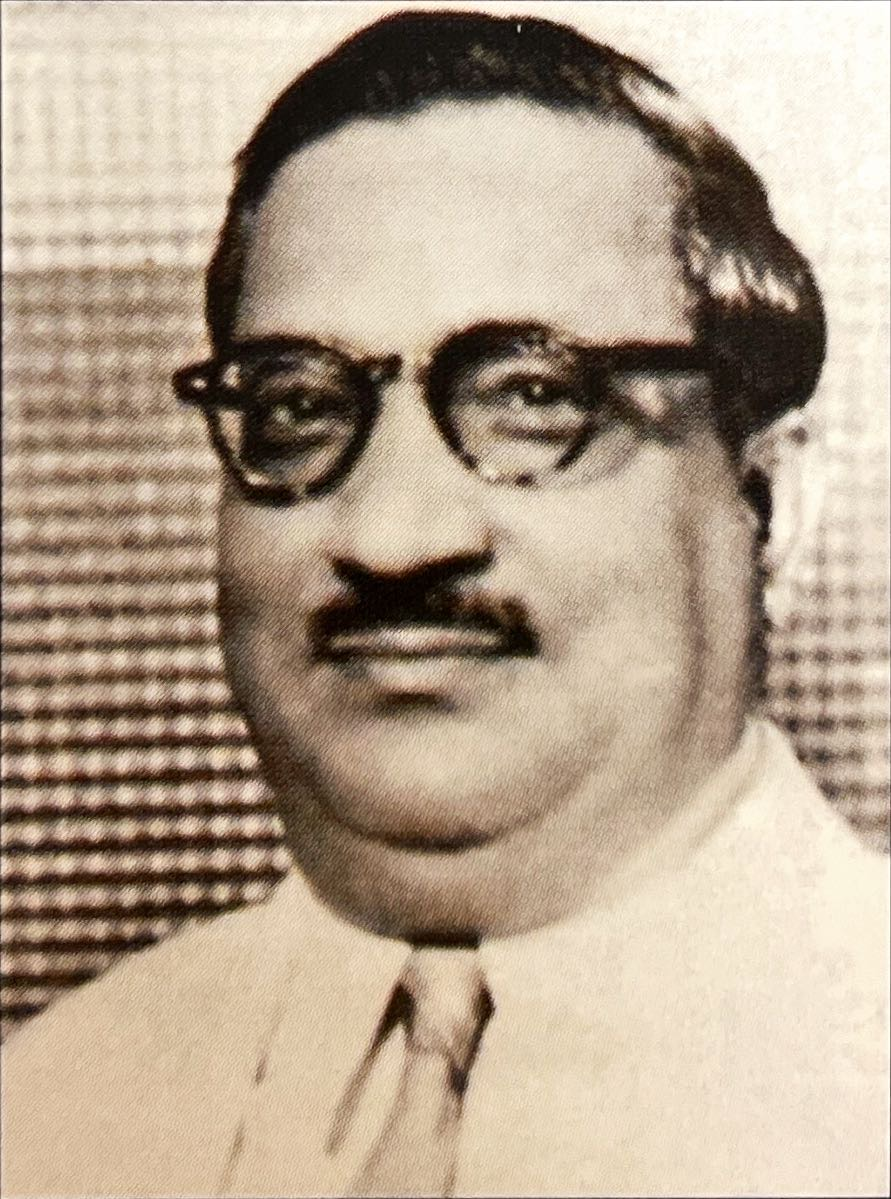
Seth Parsram Viroomal Panjabi in the 1940s. Hira's uncle.

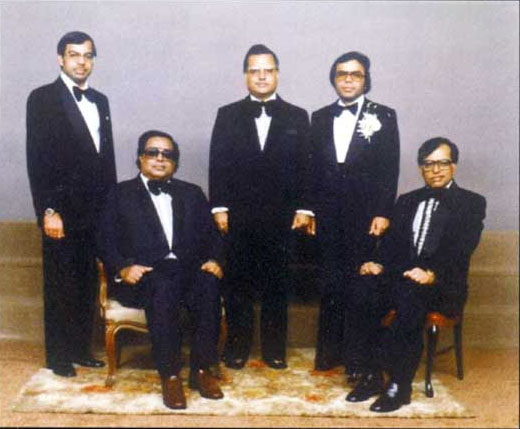
Hira with his brothers (from the left): Rajesh, Chandiram, Hiro, Kamlesh (Ryuko), and Premji.

== Career ==
Hotel Management International (HMI Hotel Group) Ltd. is a hotel management company, established in 1985. HMI manages over 40 hotels, like the "Crown Palais Hotel", which are multiple hotels of the same name.

Representative HMI Hotel Group Properties across Japan

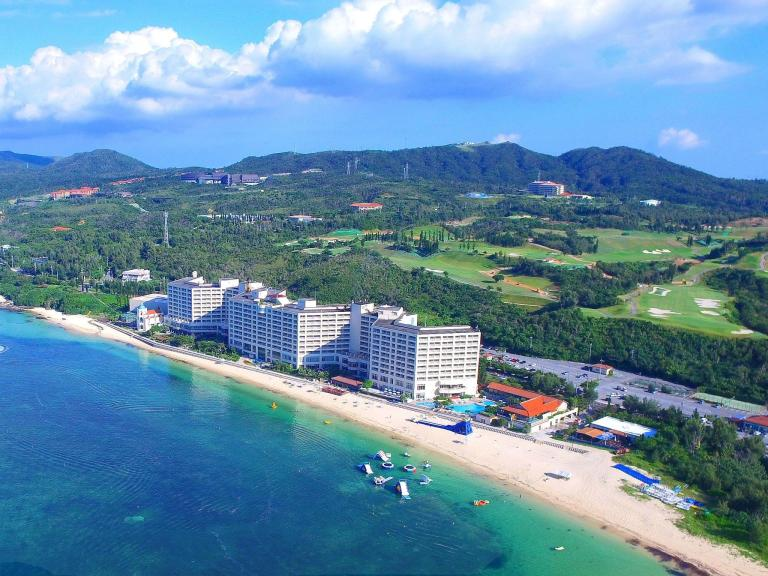
Rizzan Sea-Park Hotel in Tancha Bay, Okinawa Prefecture, is the largest hotel in Okinawa with 826 rooms

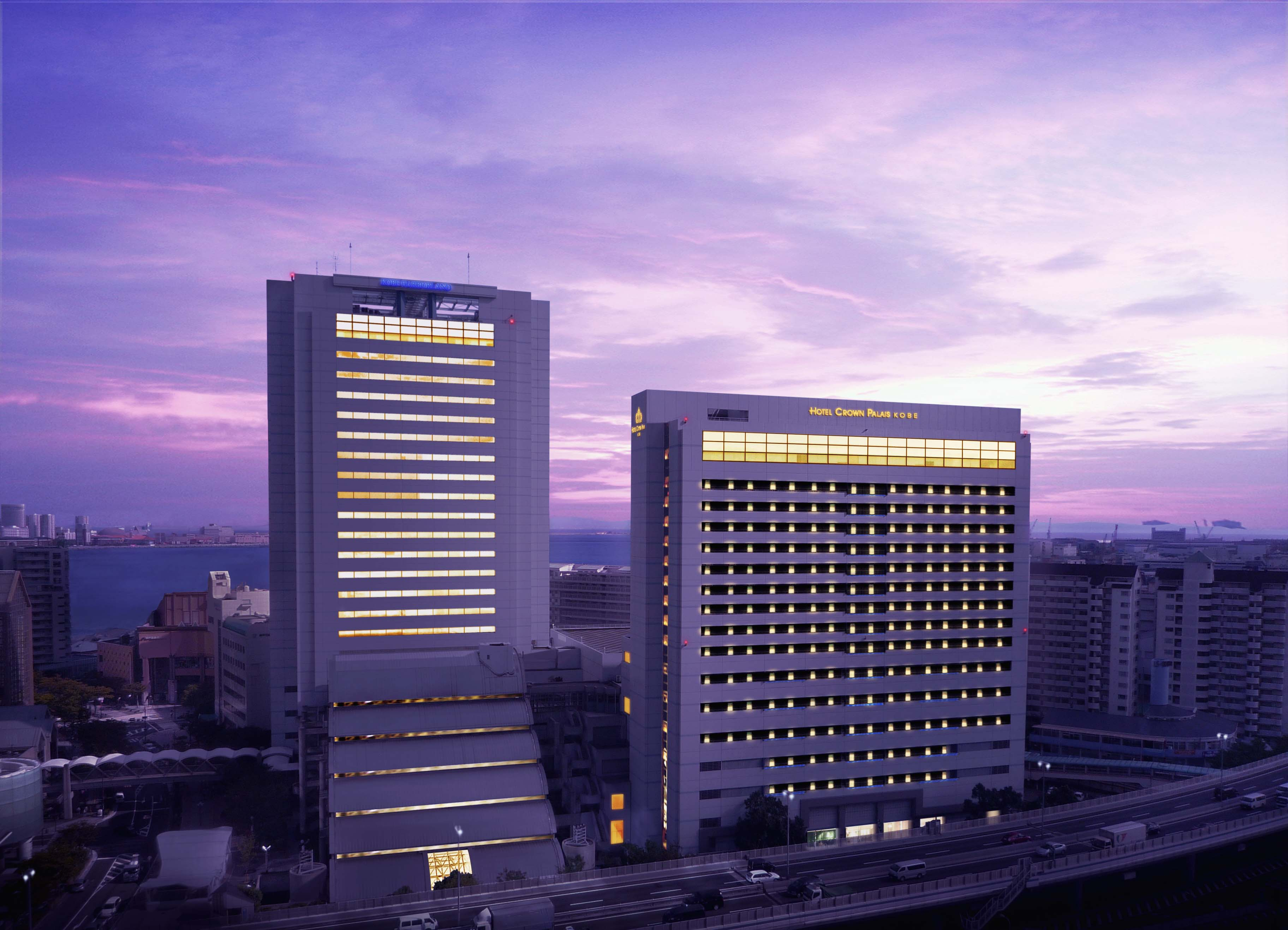
Hotel Crown Palais Kobe, and Harborland Centre Building, a large-scale complex building facing the JR Kobe station in Kobe City, Hyogo Prefecture

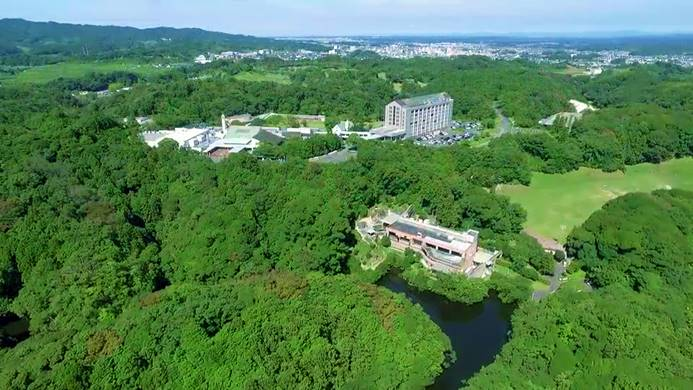
Tsumagoi Resort - Sai No Sato in Kakegawa City, Shizuoka Prefecture. An expansive, lush-green 140-hectare resort renowned for music and sports events

Hira, through his hospitality business, hosted His Highness Crown Prince Naruhito (1998), Their Majesties, Emperor Akihito and Empress Michiko (June 2008), and several other state guests. During the 2000 G8 Summit, many of the meetings were hosted at the Rizzan Sea-Park Hotel in Okinawa. French President Jacques Chirac, the Canadian Prime Minister Jean Chrétien, and other leaders of the 2000 G8 Summit stayed at the hotel.

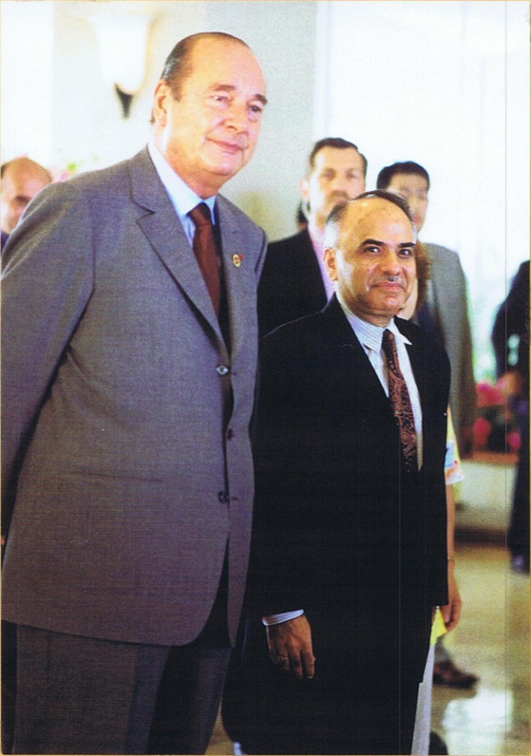
Ryuko Hira with President Jacques Chirac of France during the G8 Summit of 2000 in Rizzan Sea-Park Hotel

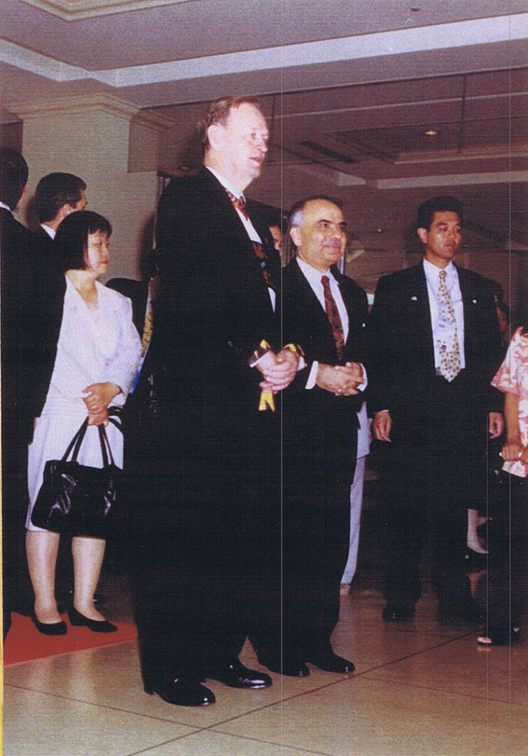
Ryuko Hira with Prime Minister Jean Chrétien of Canada during the G8 Summit of 2000 in the Rizzan Sea-Park Hotel

HMI group signed a Memorandum of understanding (MOU) with the government of Uttar Pradesh, about their hotel development businesses, at the UP Global Investor Summit 2023 held in Lucknow, Uttar Pradesh, India, on 11 February 2023. The MOU involves developing 30 chain hotels and acquiring existing national hotel operations in commercially viable business and tourism destinations. In conjunction with U.P.'s economic and tourism growth plans, this is an investment of ¥130 billion and approximately 10,000 jobs.

== Social contributions ==
Hira has supported cultural and philanthropic projects in Japan associated with Indian traditions and firms. He sponsored five Hindu prayer halls across Japan, which provide community service by cooking food for the homeless. Hira's association with Sathya Sai Publications Japan, inspired by Sri Sathya Sai Baba and his teachings.

Sri Sathya Sai Prayer Halls in Japan

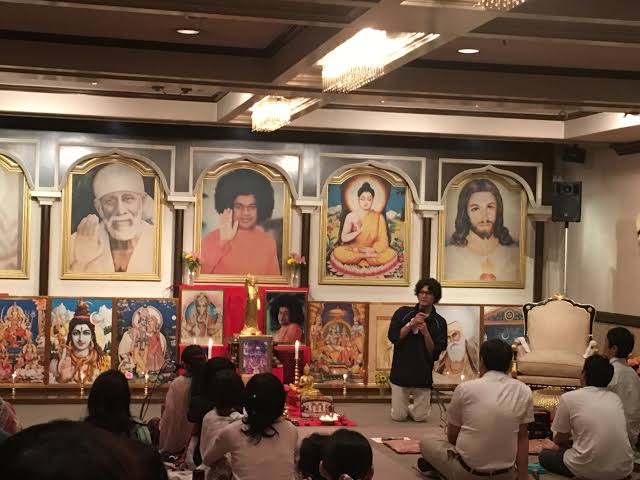
Sri Sathya Sai Prayer Hall in Tokyo, Tokyo Prefecture

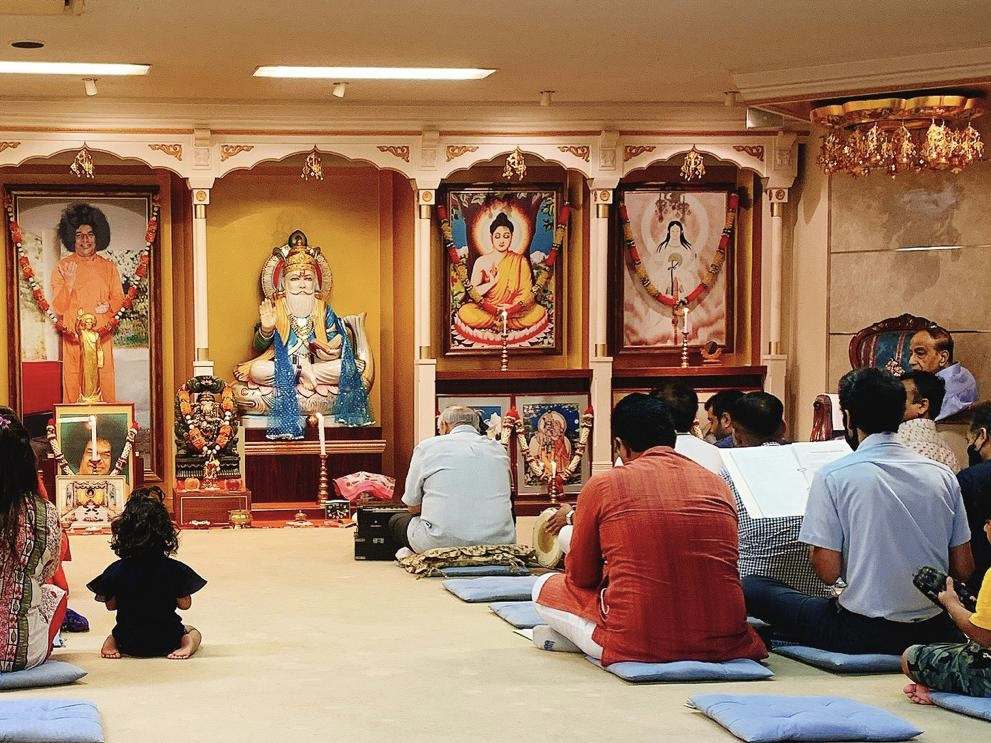
Sri Sathya Sai Prayer Hall in Yokohama City, Kanagawa Prefecture

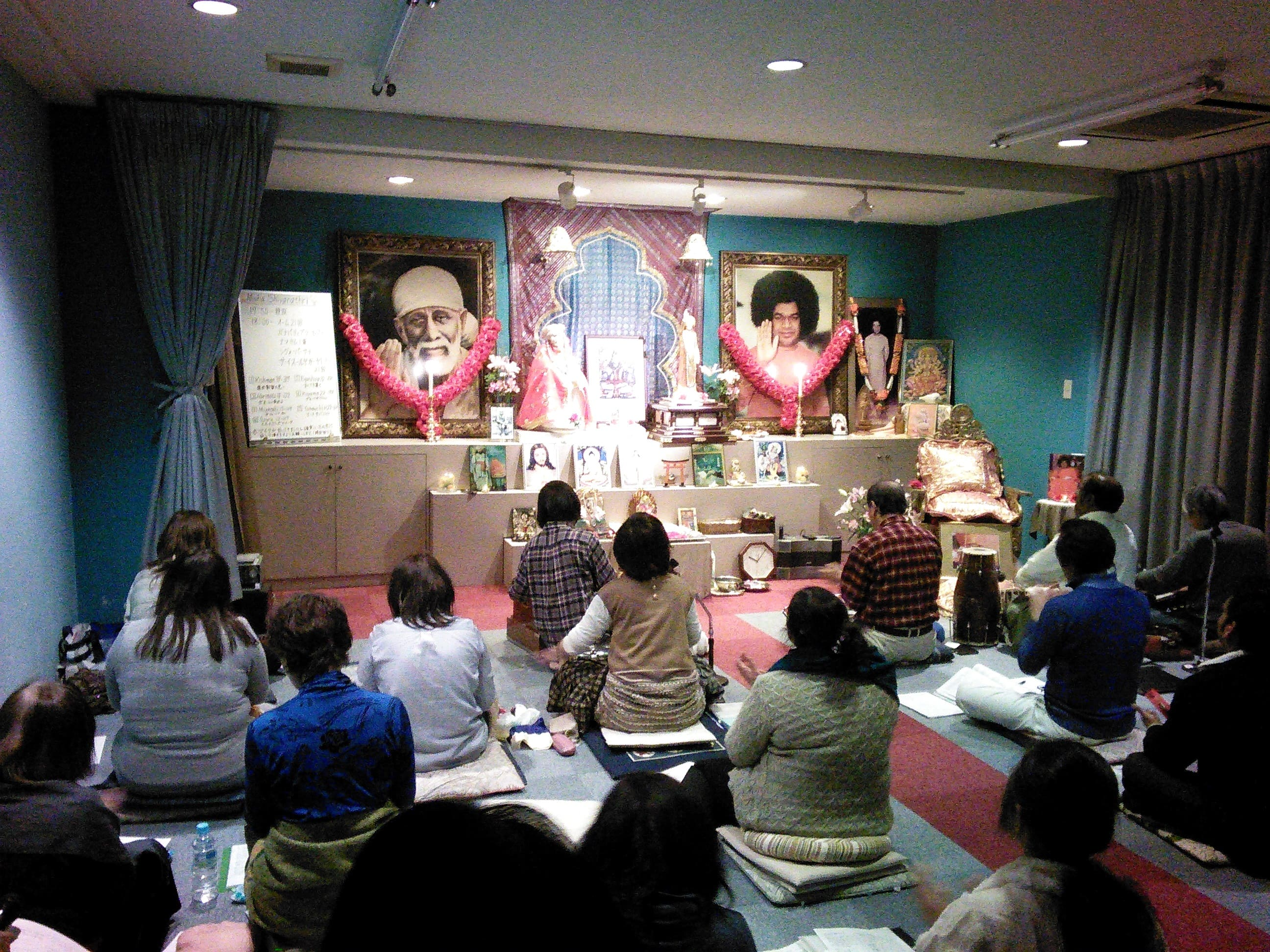
Sri Sathya Sai Prayer Hall in Osaka, Osaka Prefecture

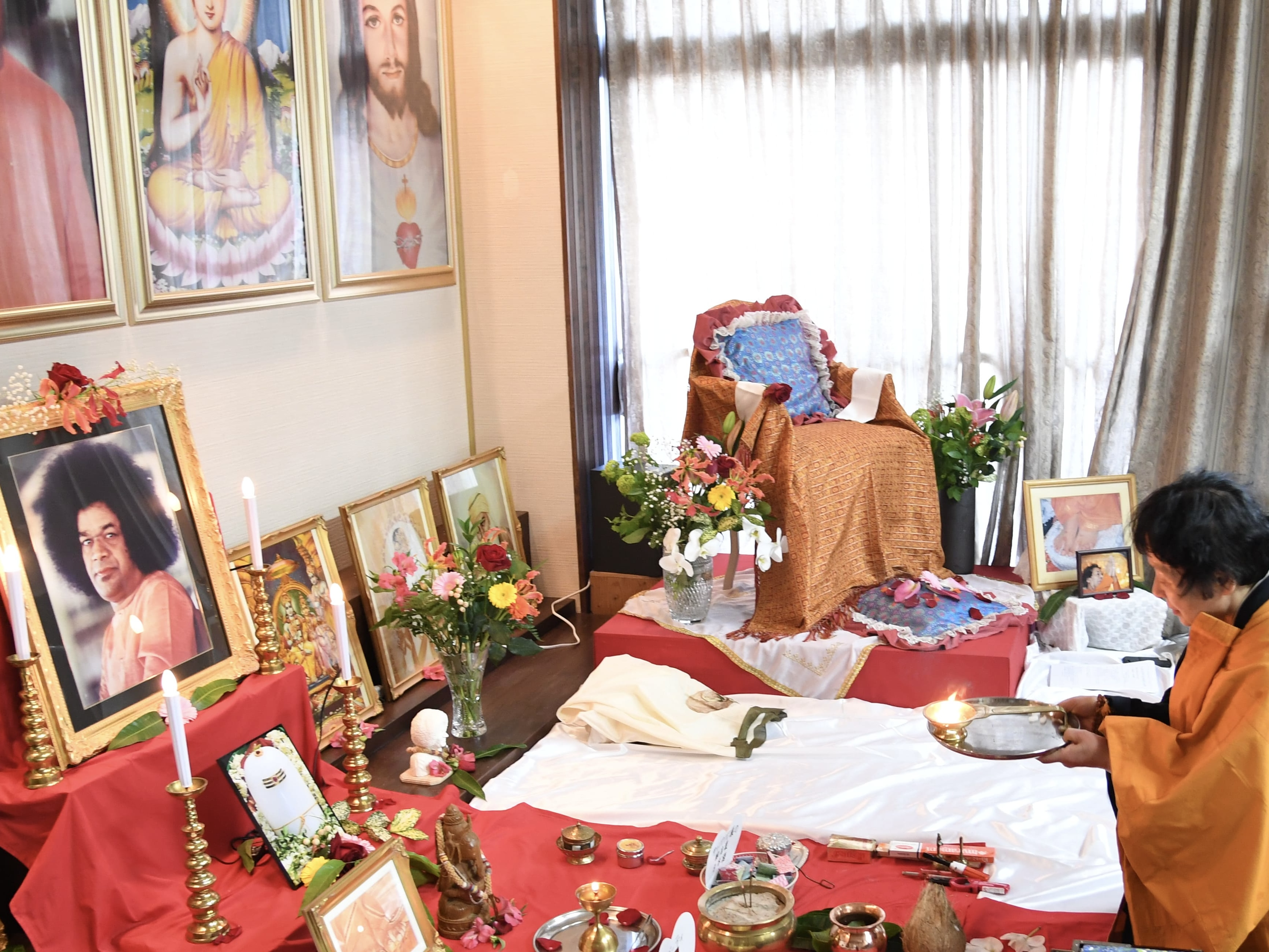
Sri Sathya Sai Prayer Hall in Kyoto, Kyoto Prefecture

During H.H. Dalai Lama's visit to Japan in November 2009, Hira hosted his holiness at the Okinawa Prefecture Peace Memorial Park. He also led an economic delegation to India in November 2015, which was notably participated in by Mr. Osamu Suzuki, Chairman of Suzuki Motor Corporation, who also attended the 34th Convocation of the Sri Sathya Sai Institute of Higher Learning. In Prashanti Nilayam, the delegation was also guided by Hira to the largest statue in the world of Lord Hanuman, the Hindu deity, who is also known as "Maruti" - India's largest brand of Maruti Suzuki Cars. In 1990, Hira patronized the construction of the Sri Sathya Sai Institute of Higher Medical Sciences in Puttaparthi, which was inaugurated by the Prime Minister of India, P.V. Narasimha Rao, in 1991, and in 2000, the construction of the Chaitanya Jyoti Museum in Prashanti Nilayam.

In October 2017, the 72nd Arts Festival by the Agency of Cultural Affairs in Japan, and the '2017 - The Year of Japan-India Friendly Exchanges' which was adopted by the governments of Japan and India, were conducted. During this, the great Indian epic 'Mahabharata' was produced by the National Kabuki Theatre in Japan under the title 'The War Chronicles of Mahabharata'. The production was delivered in a traditional Kabuki-style art form. Renowned Kabuki actors such as Onoe Kikunosuke, Bando Tamasaburo, and Onoe Kikugoro VII were part of its cast. As a commemoration of the 70th year of Indo-Japan relations, and the centenary anniversary of the Indian Commerce and Industry Association Japan (ICIJ), Hira and the Okinawa-India Friendship Association hosted a special screening of 'The War Chronicles of Mahabharata'.

In October 2019, Hira hosted the foundation stone ceremony for the Sri Sathya Sai Sanathana Samskruti - Spiritual Centre, as a project to promote further cultural exchanges between India and Japan, at Tsumagoi Resort - Sai No Sato. The project was hosted in collaboration with the Sri Sathya Sai Organization in Japan. The ceremony was attended by the chief guest, President of India, Ramnath Kovind, First Lady of India Madam Savita Kovind, Ambassador of India to Japan Sanjay Kumar Verma, Minister of Land, Infrastructure, Transport, and Tourism Kazuyoshi Akaba, and Suzuki Motor Company Chairman Osamu Suzuki, amongst others.

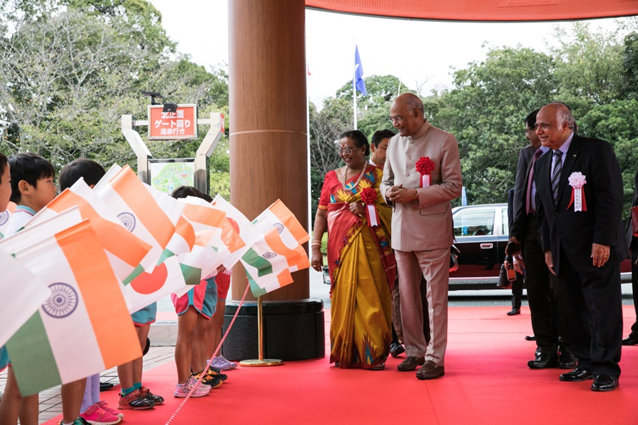
Ryuko Hira alongside President of India Ramnath Kovind, First Lady of India Madam Savita Kovind, during the foundation stone ceremony for the Sri Sathya Sai Sanathana Samskruti in Japan in October 2019.

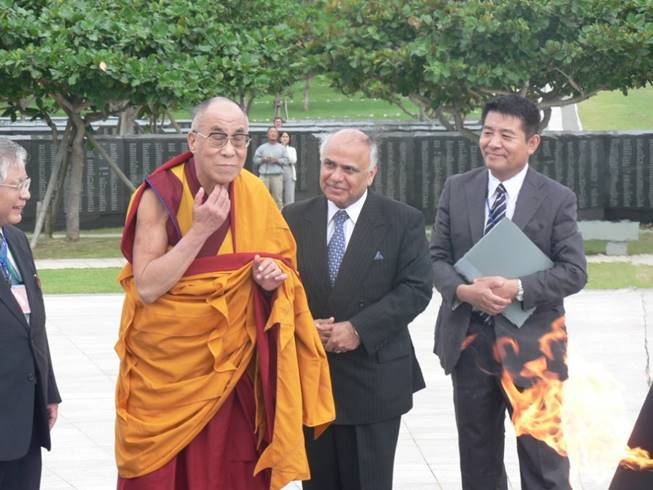
Ryuko Hira with the Dalai Lama during his visit to Okinawa Prefecture in November 2009.

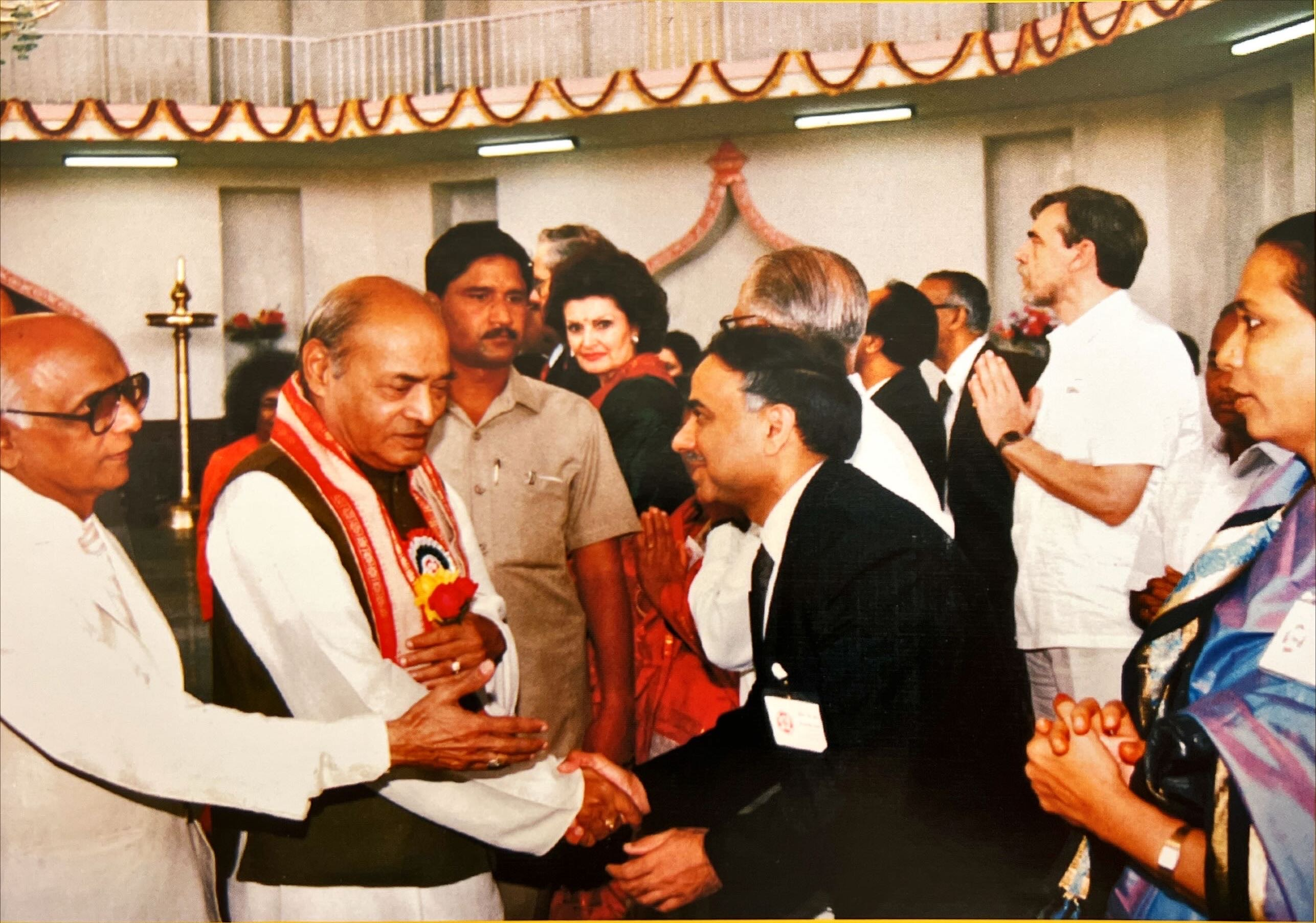
Prime Minister of India P.V. Narasimha Rao with Ryuko Hira during the Inauguration of Sri Sathya Sai Institute of Higher Medical Sciences in November 1991.

In July 2023, the Sai Hira Global Convention Centre was inaugurated by Prime Minister of India Narendra Modi, in the presence of the Governor of Andhra Pradesh Abdul Nazeer, at Prashanti Nilayam, Puttaparthi, Andhra Pradesh. During the inauguration, the Prime Minister spoke on the potential and significance of the convention centre, his connection to Sri Sathya Sai Baba, and specifically mentioned his close relationship with Ryuko Hira during his address. Hira was honored during the ceremony by the Sri Sathya Sai Central Trust for his contributions to the Sathya Sai Community. In 2023, the Sai Hira Global Convention Centre was inaugurated at Puttaparthi in Andhra Pradesh, India, following a donation from Hira.

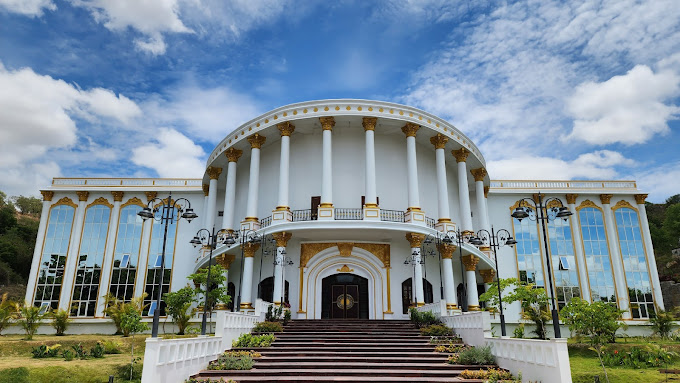
Sai Hira Global Convention Centre

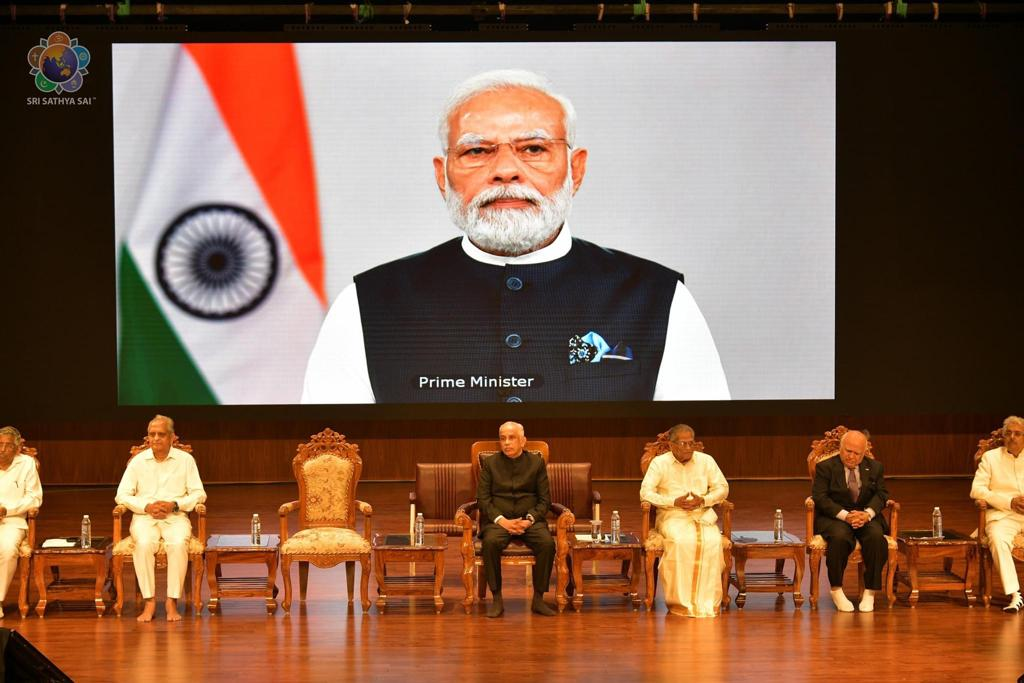
Prime Minister of India - Narendra Modi addressing the gathering at the inauguration of Sai Hira Global Convention Centre

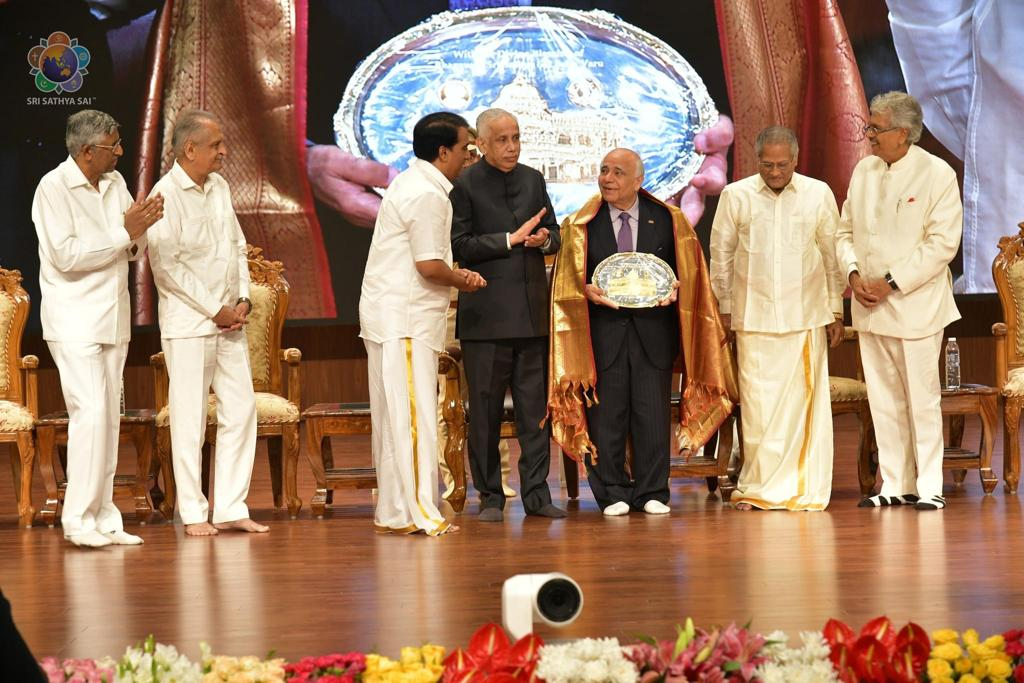
Ryuko Hira being felicitated by Sri Sathya Sai Central Trust during the inauguration of 'Sai Hira Global Convention Centre'

== Involvement in Indo-Japan relations ==
Over the decades, Hira has played a vital role in coordinating agreements, memorandums, and the like amongst various tier governments of India and Japan. Some prominent examples of Hira's contribution as a coordinator can be noted in the following memorandums:

Chronological list of memoranda involving Ryuko Hira's contribution
Year	Month	Memorandum
2018	October	Ministry of Ayush - Kanagawa Prefecture MOU
2016	November	State of Gujarat - Hyogo Prefecture MOC
2016	August	Gujarat - Hyogo Goodwill, Education and Economic Delegation
2016	March	State of Karnataka - Mie Prefecture MOU
2015	December	State of Kerala - San In District MOU
2015	December	Establishment of Toyama - India Association
2015	December	Andhra Pradesh - Toyama Memorandum of State Level Cooperation
2015	November	Japan Advanced Institute of Science and Technology - Sri Sathya Sai Institute of Higher Education Comprehensive Memorandum of Understanding
2015	November	Andhra Pradesh - Shizuoka, Ishikawa Economic and Education Delegation
2015	July	Rajasthan - Aichi Economic Delegation
2014	September	India-Japan Tourism Treaty
2013	October	Maharashtra - Wakayama Comprehensive MOU
2002	-	Okinawa-India Friendship Association

Hira was amongst the guests invited to attend the welcome dinner, hosted by Indian president Pranab Mukherjee at Rashtrapati Bhavan, in honor of Their Majesties, Emperor Akihito and Empress Michiko of Japan's state visit to India in November-December 2013. During this visit, Sai Hira India Foundation sponsored an exhibition at the India International Centre in New Delhi, on the anniversary of the Emperor's visit to India as Crown Prince fifty-three years prior, in December 1960.

In January 2014, Hira played a role in the establishment of a memorandum between the Ministry of Tourism of the Republic of India and the Japan Tourism Agency, the Ministry of Land, Infrastructure, Transport, and Tourism. In cooperation with the Japan National Tourism Organization (JNTO), Hira's contributed to major relaxations of short-term visas for Indian citizens visiting Japan. In January 2016, Hira was invited by the Chief Cabinet Secretary, Yoshihide Suga, for an expert meeting at the Prime Minister’s official residence, wherein he proposed policy measures to liberalize tourism from India to Japan over the next 5 years.

In April 2016, he delivered a lecture at the Ceremonial Occasion Research Institute Co., Ltd, about the culture of ceremonial occasions in India. Hira was also involved in the tourism and transport sectors during Prime Minister Modi's official visit to Japan in November 2016 and October 2018, as well as Prime Minister Abe's official visit to India in September 2017. Hira has participated in the G20 Tourism Ministers' Meeting held in Niseko, Hokkaido, wherein he also attended the Indo-Japan bilateral tourism conference. In October 2019, Hira was instrumental in the launch of the new ANA flight route from Narita to Chennai and attended its inauguration ceremony.

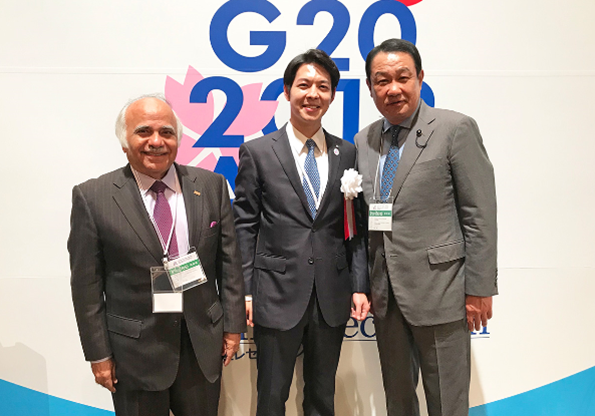
Ryuko Hira with Governor Naomichi Suzuki of Hokkaido Prefecture during the G20 Tourism Ministers' Meeting in October 2019.

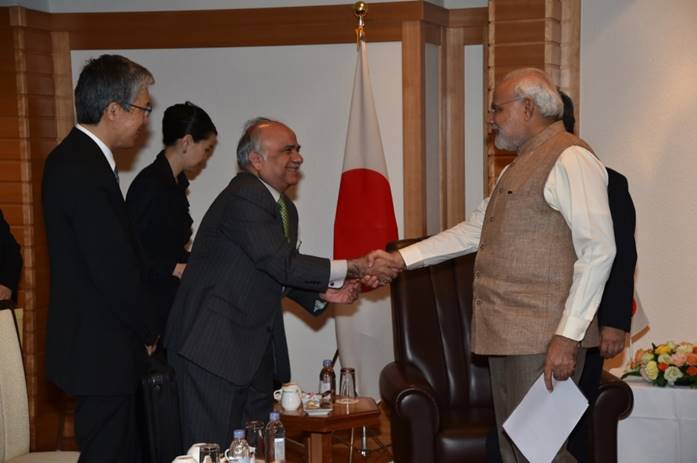
Ryuko Hira with Prime Minister of India Narendra Modi, during the Aichi-India Friendship Agreement in September 2014.

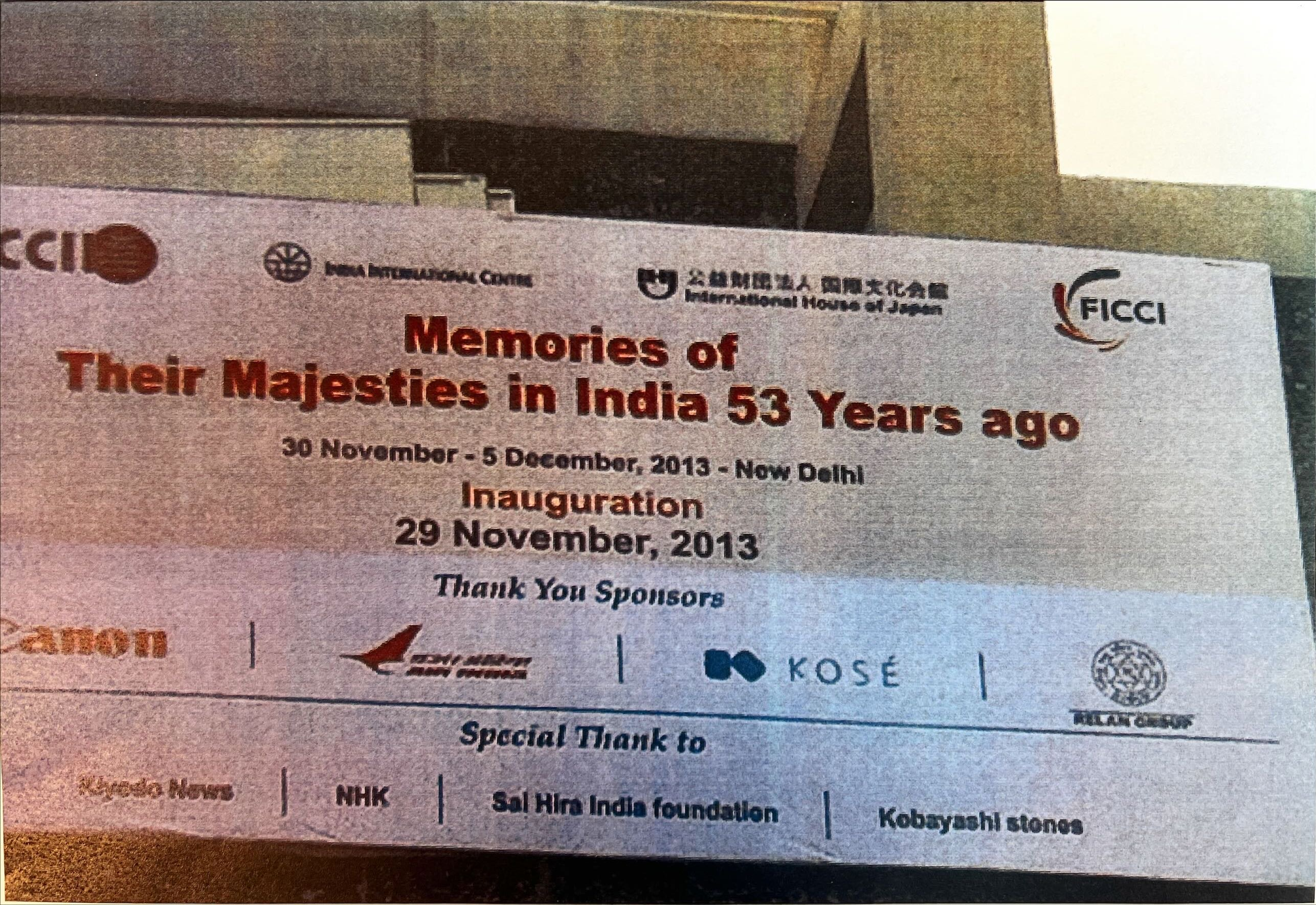
Sai Hira India Foundation was accredited in the 'Memories of Their Majesties in India 53 years ago' exhibition in November 2013.

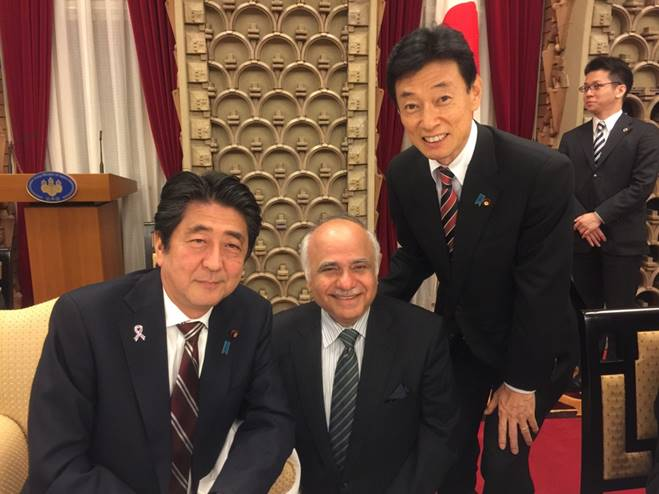
Ryuko Hira with Prime Minister of Japan - Shinzo Abe and Minister of Economy, Trade, and Industry of Japan - Yasutoshi Nishimura

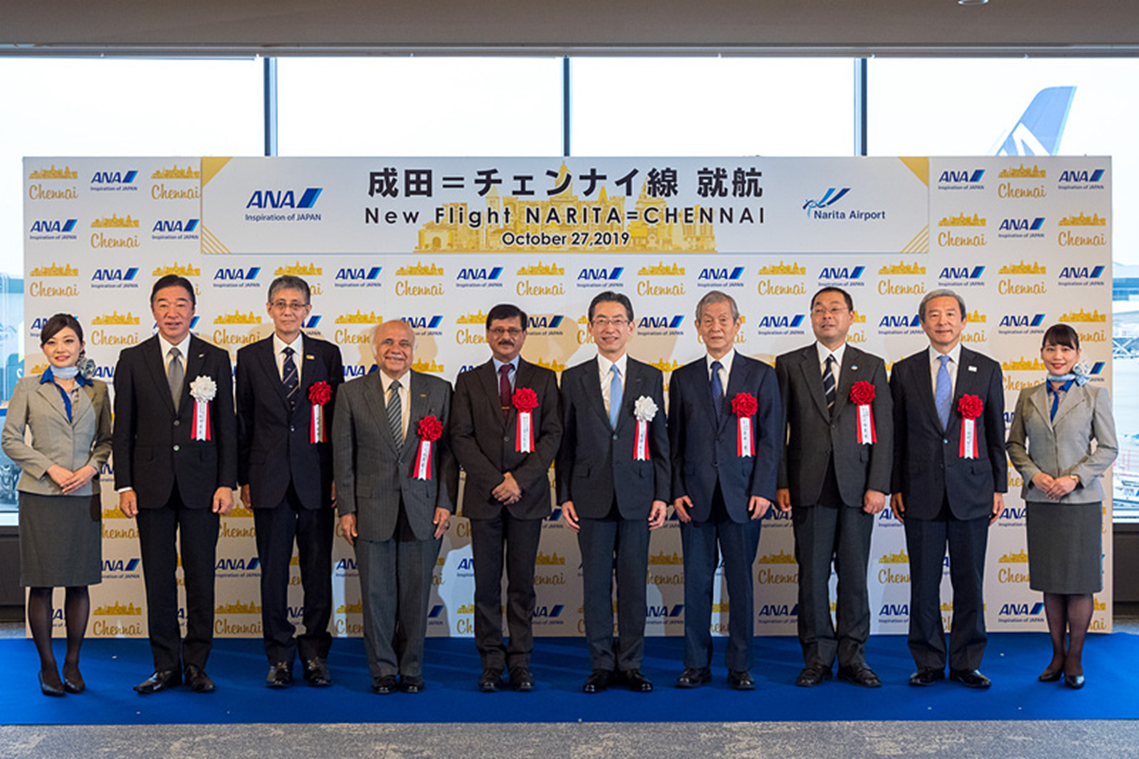
Ryuko Hira with Ambassador of India to Japan, H.E. Sanjay Kumar Verma, and other dignitaries during the Narita-Chennai flight inauguration in October 2019.

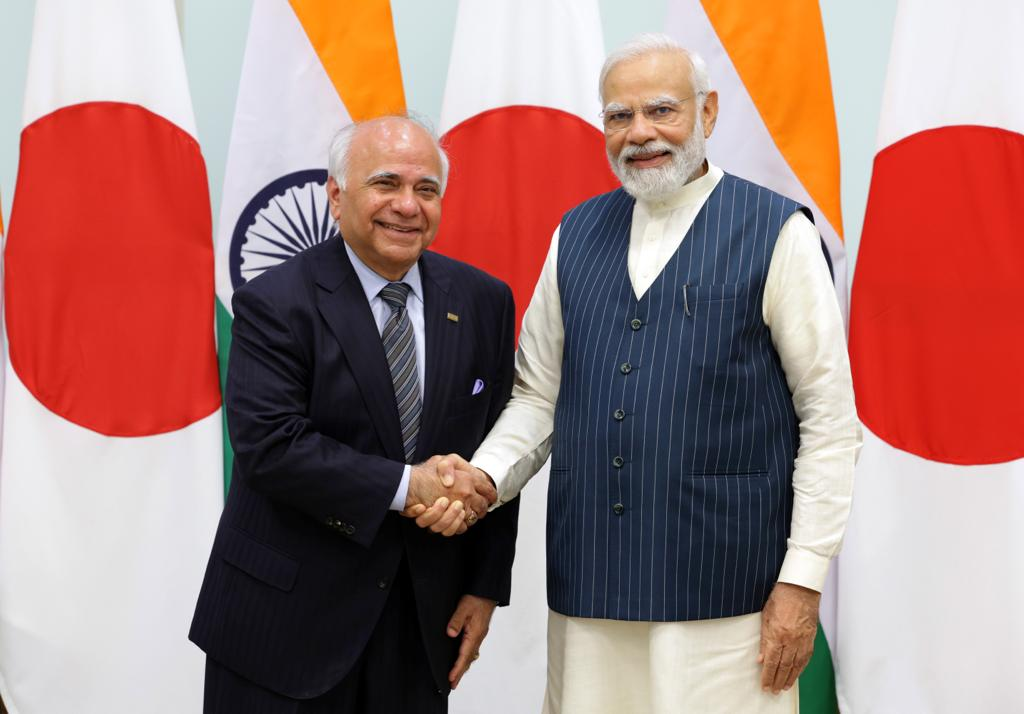
Ryuko Hira with the Prime Minister of India, Narendra Modi, in July 2023

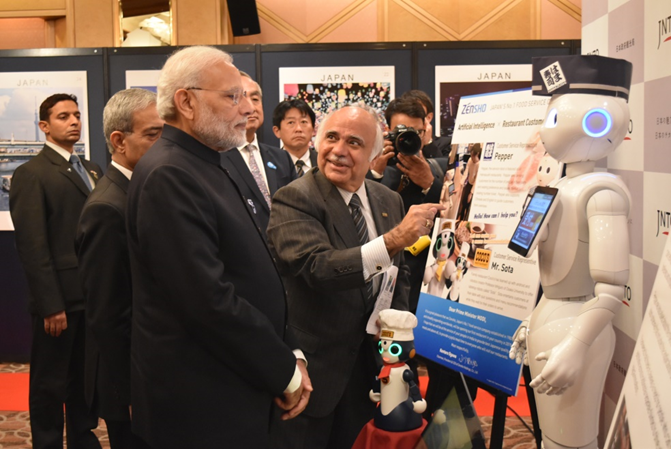
Ryuko Hira guiding Prime Minister of India - Narendra Modi at the JNTO Robot Pavilion during his State visit in October 2018

== Honors and awards ==
- In April 2024, Japan's Minister of Land, Infrastructure, Transport and Tourism (Tetsuo Saito) presented Hira with the National Award of Honor for Tourism in recognition of his 40 years of work in Japan's hotel industry.
- In 2023, Sri Sathya Sai Central Trust and the Governor of Andhra Pradesh, Abdul Nazeer, recognized Hira for his contributions to the establishment of the Sai Hira Global Convention Centre.
- In 2022, the president of India conferred on Hira the Padma Shri award for his contribution to the field of trade and industry, recognizing his role as a senior business leader in Japan, instrumental in promoting India-Japan relations.
- In 2022, Hira was honoured jointly by the Cabinet Office of Japan and the Director of the Okinawa General Bureau for his substantial contribution to the tourism and land transportation industries in Okinawa Prefecture. Apart from this, he has also been conferred with several Japanese travel and tourism industry awards.
- In 2010, the president of India conferred on Hira the Pravasi Bharatiya Samman Award for his entrepreneurship and his contribution to the Indian community in Japan in the cultural, economic, and social fields.
- In 1998, Hira was honoured at the Great Hall of the People during Madame Chiang Kai-shek`s 100th birth anniversary for hosting the first All-China Provinces' Human Values Essay Contest.
- In 1992, Hira was honoured for his contribution to and lectures on Buddhism at the 'First Conference in Korea for Teachers to Introduce Human Values (EHV)' by the Sathya Sai Organization of Korea at Dongguk University, Seoul, Korea.
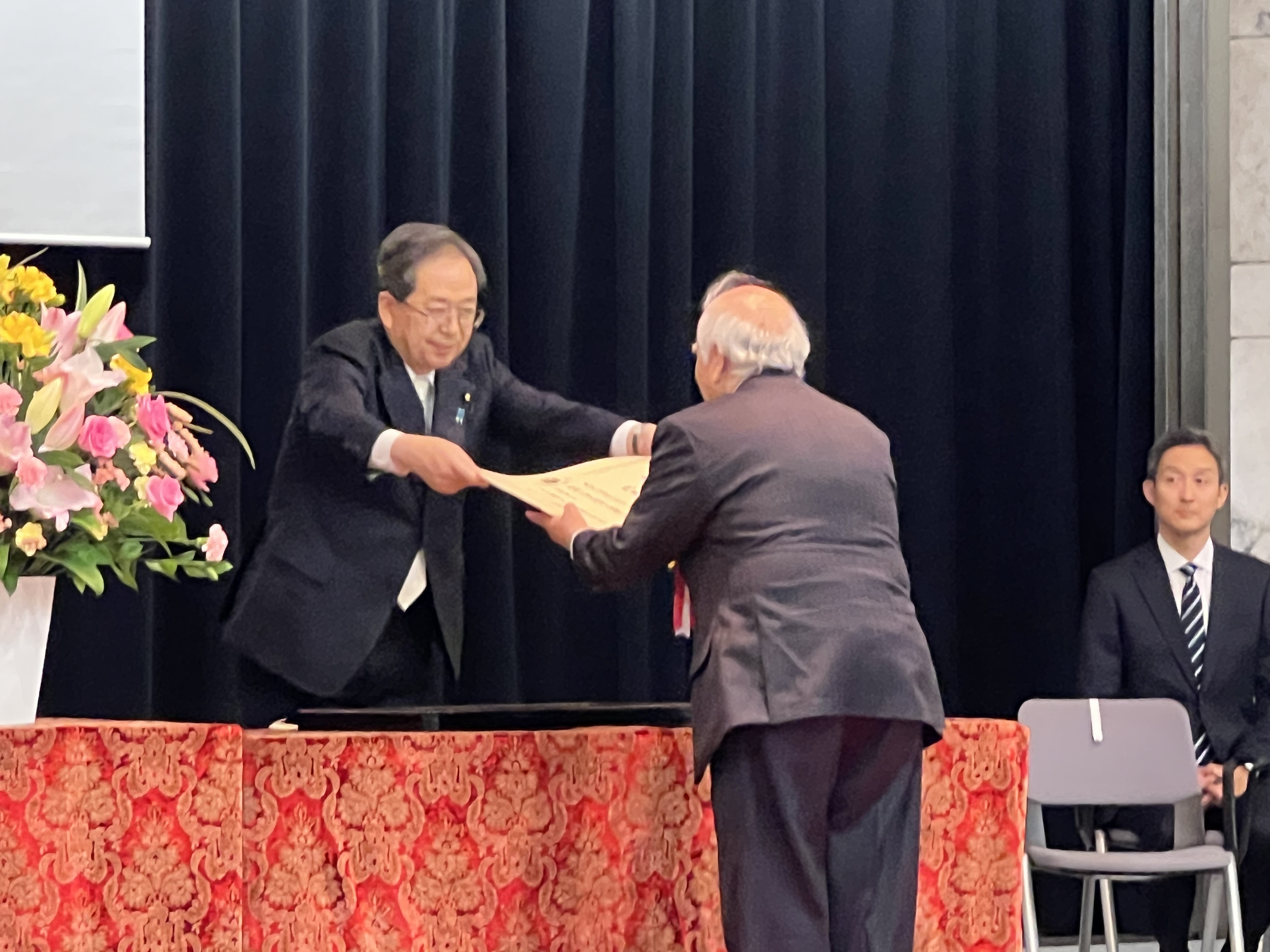
Ryuko Hira being conferred the National Award of Honor by Minister of Land, Infrastructure, Transport and Tourism, Tetsuo Saito, in April 2024

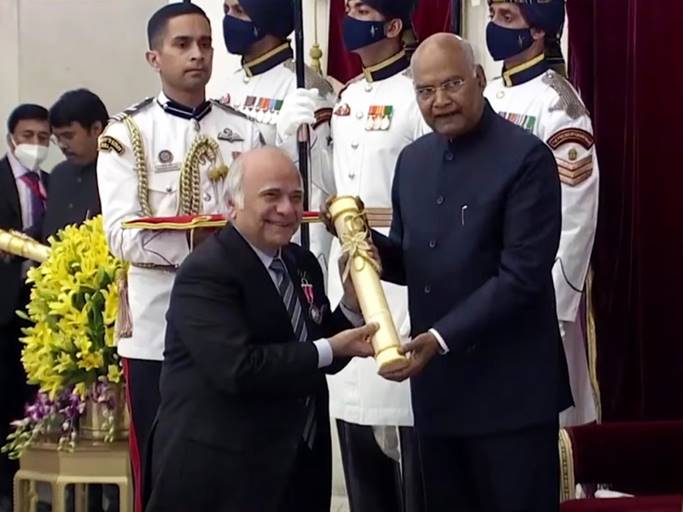
Ryuko Hira being awarded Padma Shri in March 2023

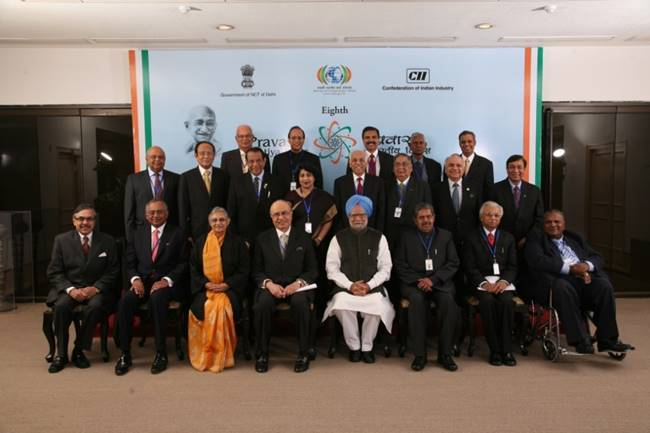
Ryuko Hira amongst fellow Pravasia Bharatiya Samman Awardees in 2010

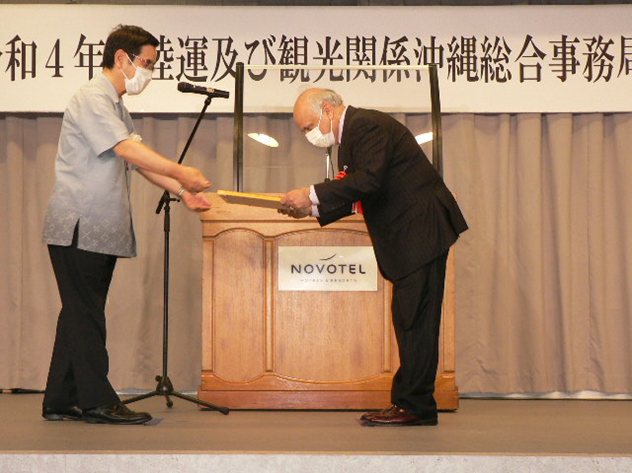
Ryuko Hira being honored in Okinawa in 2022

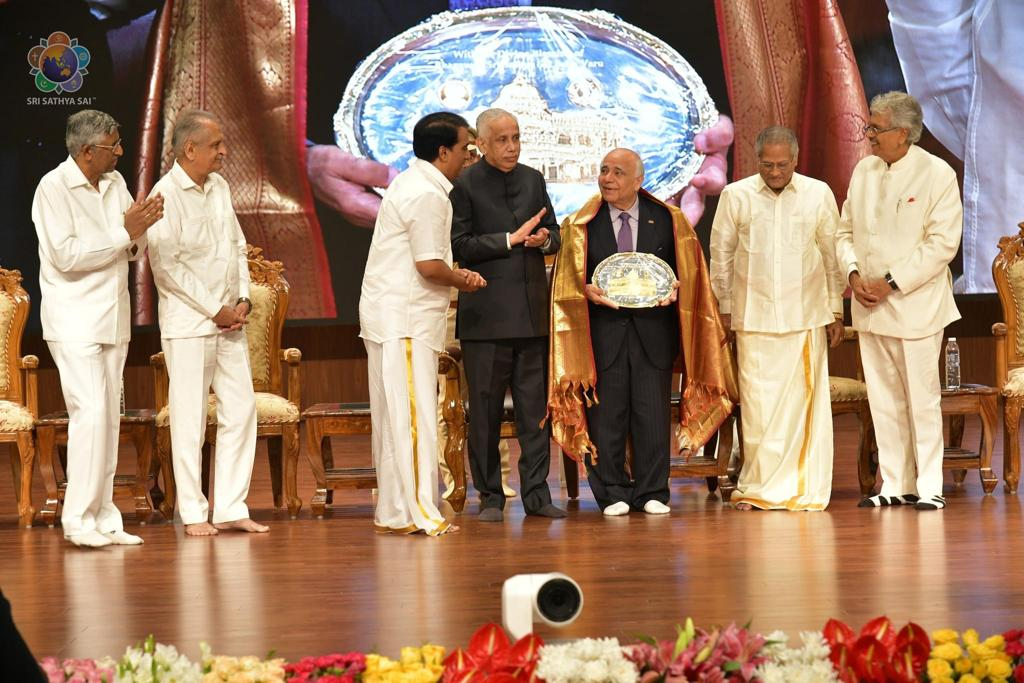
Ryuko Hira being felicitated by Sri Sathya Sai Central Trust during the inauguration of 'Sai Hira Global Convention Centre' in July 2023

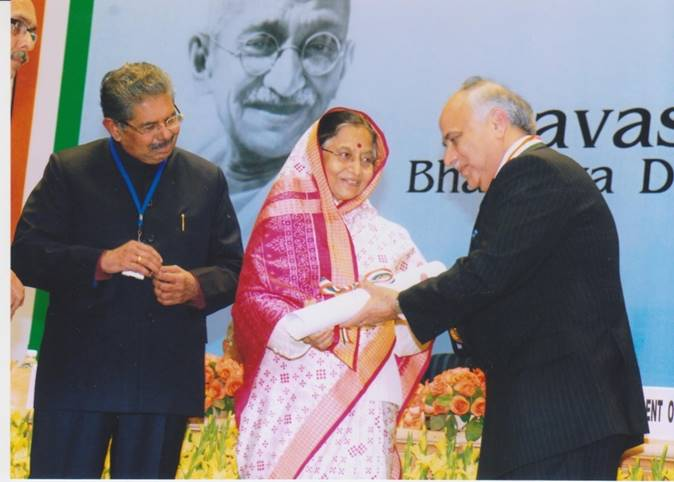
Ryuko Hira being awarded the Pravasi Bharatiya Samman Award by President Pratibha Patil in January 2010.

== Publications ==
Hira has written and published 61 articles in major Japanese daily newspapers to raise India's visibility among Japanese readers. In 1974, Hira sponsored and supported 13 Japanese scholars for the publication of the first Sanskrit, Hindi to-Japanese Dictionary. In addition, the same team translated and published nine volumes of the great Indian epic 'Mahabharata,' Vedas, and Upanishads, works of Sri Adi Shankaracharya, several books on Buddhism, Sikhism, and a compendium of Hindu deities. On the 50th anniversary of the 'Indo-Japanese Cultural Treaty' in 2007, the Embassy of India in Japan and the Institute of Sathya Sai Education jointly honoured the scholars with awards and citations. Since 1978, Hira has also sponsored, translated, and published over 132 periodicals and books in the Japanese language on Indian culture and spirituality through Sathya Sai Publications Japan.

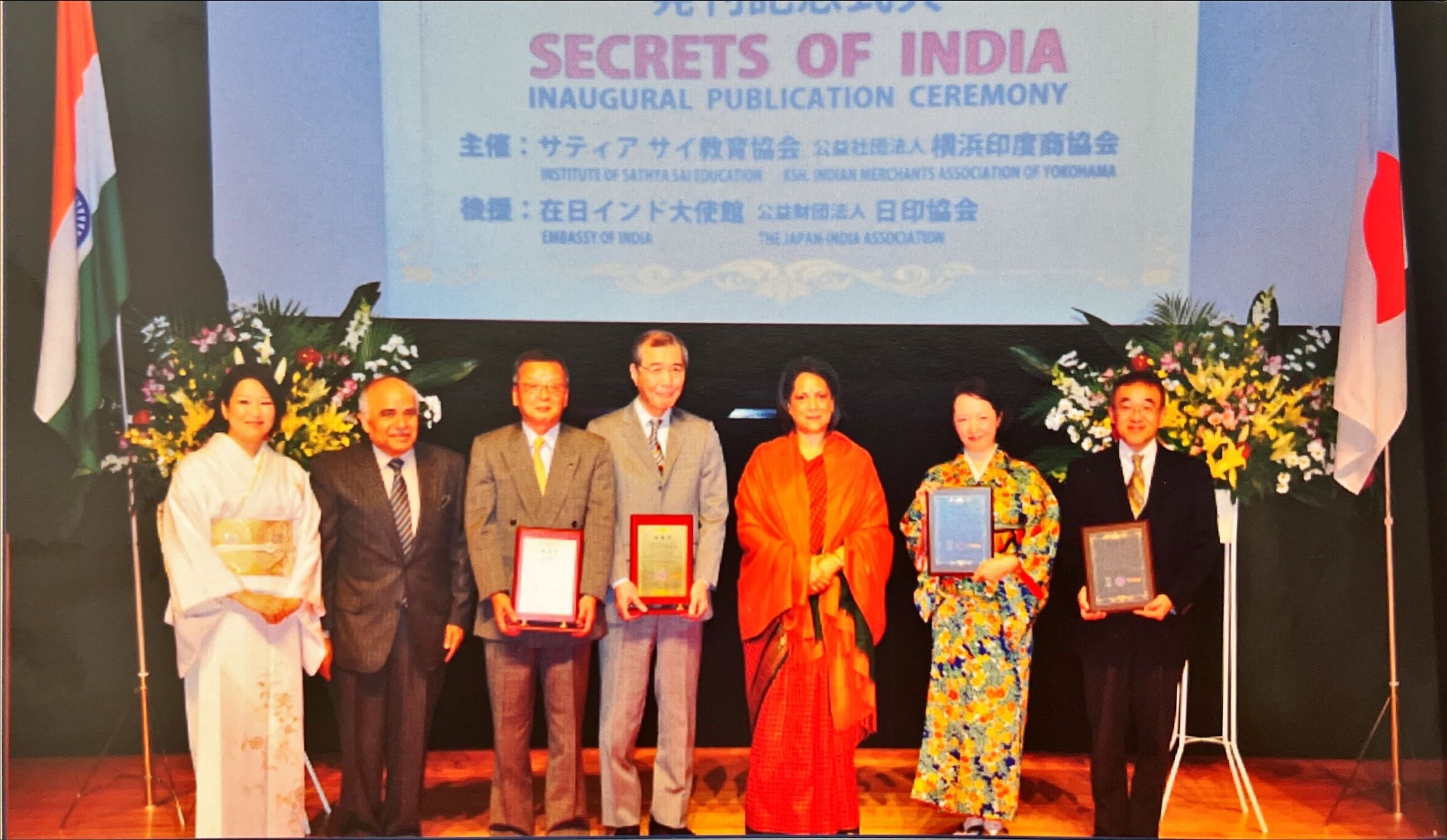
Ryuko Hira alongside the Ambassador of India to Japan - Deepa Wadhwa, and other guests during the inauguration ceremony of the book 'Secrets of India - インドのひみつ'

In 1981, Hira sponsored a Hindi-language commentary (translated by NHK) for visitors to the Hiroshima Peace Memorial to benefit Indian visitors. Since 1983, Hira has served as the chief editor of Sairam News, a monthly newsletter published by Sathya Sai Publications Japan. In an affinity survey poll conducted by the Cabinet Office of Japan in 2010, young Japanese students were found to have no interest in India, mainly due to the lack of availability of lesson books introducing India to primary school students of Japan. In response, Hira published a book entitled Secrets of India, with the support of the All Japan National Congress of Parent Teacher Associations. The book was officially released in 2012 by the Embassy of India in Japan on the 60th anniversary of India-Japan Diplomatic Relations.

Most of Hira's books are sold on the Japanese Amazon bookstore today. Over 30 books have been placed at national and regional public libraries, including the cultural centre library of the Embassy of India in Japan.

== Devotion to Sathya Sai Baba ==
He was first introduced to Sri Sathya Sai Baba in 1978 and has been a student, and adopted a lifestyle in line with their teaching since then. Hira has supported philanthropic initiatives associated with the Sri Sathya Sai movement.

Hira has been associated with organizations connected to the teachings of Sri Sathya Sai Baba and served as chairman of the Sri Sathya Sai Organization’s Region B, which included over 80 countries. He is currently a trustee of the Sri Sathya Sai Central Trust and President of both Sathya Sai Publications Japan and the Institute of Sathya Sai Education Japan. He has organized workshops, exhibitions, and symposiums on Gayatri Mantra and its significance, the harms of alcohol and smoking, and the national annual Sai conventions in Japan. A spiritual milestone was achieved on the 80th Birthday of Sri Sathya Sai Baba on 23 November 2005, when over 100 young Japanese fluently recited the whole of the Vedas in perfect Sanskrit pronunciation without referring to the text from memory. Since then, 300 Japanese have learned to recite the Vedas with appreciable pronunciation and decipher their meanings.

The Tohoku earthquake and tsunami occurred in the Oshika Peninsula on 11 March 2011, with over 22,000 casualties. The Sathya Sai Organization Japan was one of the first service organizations to respond to the disaster. On 12 March 2011, the next morning, the team prepared 3,600 two-litre water bottles and 300 fresh onigiris and advanced to the disaster sites. Hira's Hotel Pearl City Sendai and Hotel Pearl City Kesennuma were used as a deceased victims identification centre, as well as the base of operations for NHK and local police forces. With the assistance of the Japanese Coast Guard, the relief items were delivered to the victims via boats and helicopters. Sairam News reported that under the leadership of Ryuko Hira, contributions from members from all over the country, and the Embassy of India in Japan, various relief supplies including towels, socks, heating packs, emergency blue sheets, undergarments, portable gas stoves, diapers, sanitary products, clothes, rice, frozen foods, juices, and other emergency food items continued to be delivered to the victims for 6 months.

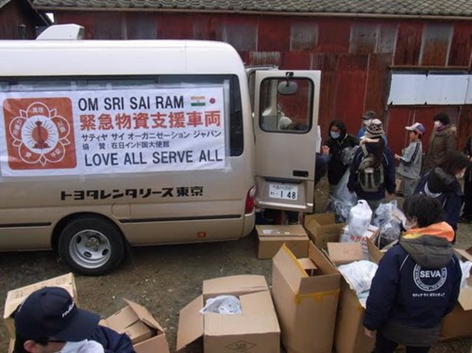
The Sathya Sai Organization's emergency service truck carrying support relief items arriving at the disaster site.

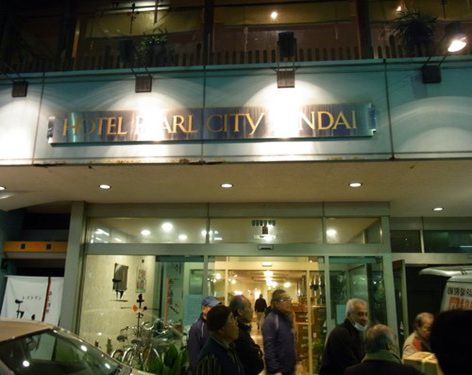
Ryuko Hira alongside the service members outside Hotel Pearl City Sendai, instructing the team.

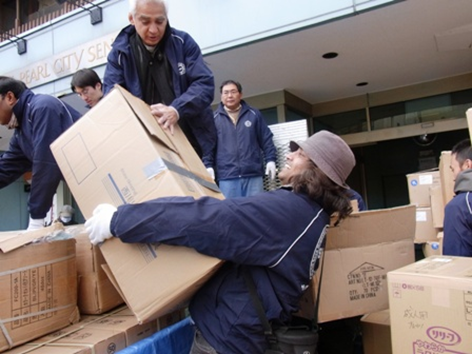
Sathya Sai Youth carrying the relief item boxes to be loaded onto the coast guard patrol boats.

In similar service activities, during the Great Hanshin Earthquake that occurred on 17 January 1995 in Hyogo Prefecture, Sathya Sai Organization Japan responded to the disaster immediately. Sairam News reported that water, emergency food items, blankets, and other relief items were delivered to the victims. There were members themselves who were victims but still volunteered in the spirit of Sai Service.

== Name and citizenship ==
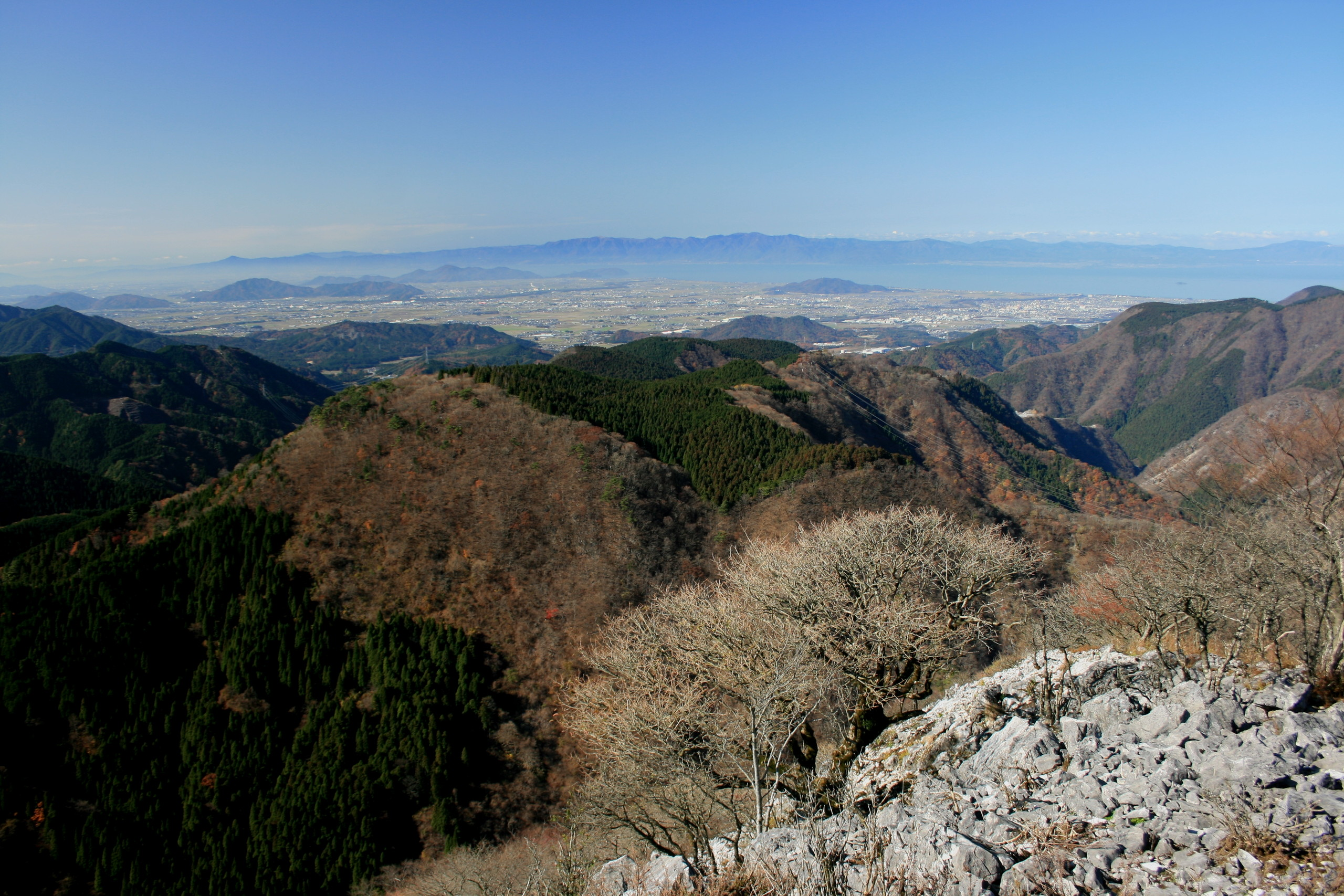
The Hira Mountains in Shiga Prefecture where Ryuko Hira received his prophesized name.

Hira writes about the socialist reforms that happened at that time, which led to his family to make long-term commitments to Japan. His first Indian name, 'Kamlesh', meant the lord of lotus flowers, and his last name, 'Panjabi', meant 5 rivers. He states that the direct translation of his name would be queer in Japanese characters, and since most local government officers did not read or write English at the time, his name being written in Kanji was a legal requirement.

Hira's friend, Mr. Mihara from Kyoto, introduced him to a Japanese priest of the Hindu temple of Lord Vishnu (Bishamon-ten) located on top of Mount Hira in Shiga Prefecture. This priest specialized in the art of Japanese calligraphy and 'Jikaku' - the number of strokes in a Kanji character that decides the destiny of a name. After 21 days of meeting with the priest, he received the name Hira Ryuko (比良 竜虎). Hira represents Mount Hira, '竜/Ryu' and '虎/Ko', the two kanji represent dragon (Japan) and tiger (India) respectively, symbolizing prosperity and strength. According to later interviews, Hira said that a priest suggested the name ‘Ryuko’ to symbolize cultural links between Japan and India.

== See also ==
- Padma Shri Award recipients in 2022
- Hotel Management International (HMI Hotel Group)
- Sri Sathya Sai Baba
- Sri Sathya Sai Institute of Higher Learning
- Sri Sathya Sai Institute of Higher Medical Sciences

== Additional reading ==
- Extracts from Hira's Tryst with Divinity interview with Radio Sai's Karuna Munshi, which was first broadcast on 6 August 2013: Karuna Munshi. "Sai Samurai – Ryuko Hira of Japan". Sri Sathya Sai Media Centre. Sri Sathya Sai Central Trust.
- Hira, Ryuko (November 2019). "Sathya Sai Values-Based Education in Japan" (PDF). Sanathana Sarathi. November 2019 (Special Issue): 25–29.
- G.V.R., Subba Rao (31 July 2018). "Jaipur-born Ryuko Hira bats for Japanese FDI in A.P." The Hindu. Vijaywada.
- Kao, Yung-Hsiang (15 April 2018). "As HMI expands, sights set on drawing Indian visitors". The Japan Times.
- Hira, Ryuko (18 January 2010). "True Indian?" (PDF). Monthly Journal of Japan-India Association. 106 (10).
- Sairam News. "Watashi No Tabi (My Journey)". Sairam News.
- Hira, Ryuko (1 January 2014). "One Indian View of the Imperial Visit". Monthly Journal of Japan-India Association. 111 (1).
- BBC Migration (30 January 2019). "Fourteen Richest Indians Who Are Settled in Abroad". BBC Migration Consultants.
- "Focussing on visitors from overseas" (PDF). Chuunichi Shimbun Shizuoka. 25 April 2017.
