= HMI Hotel Group =

Hotel management company in Japan

- Native name: ホテルマネージメントインターナショナル
- Type: Private
- Industry: Hotel Brand
- Founded: October 1, 1998
- Founder: Ryuko Hira
- Headquarters: 10F Yamaman Bldg., 6-1 Nihonbashi-koami-cho, Chuo-ku., Tokyo, Japan
- Area served: Japan and India
- Key people: Ryuko Hira, Hiroaki Aoto, Teruo Nishimura, Toshikazu Ogaki
- Net income: JPY 2,057 million (2019)
- Total assets: JPY 25,536 million (2019)
- Number of employees: 5000+
- Subsidiaries: Positive Dream persons
- Website: hmihotelgroup.com

HMI Hotel Group, established in 1966, owns and operates 46 properties across Japan. Under the principle (Life is a Journey), HMI Hotels are divided into 7 brands: Creston, Crown Palais, Seapark & Greenpark Resorts, HMI Ryokans, Hotel Wellness, Top Wellness and Pearl City Hotel. With over 10 million guests each year, HMI Hotel Group is the 8th largest hotel chain in Japan. It is headed by Ryuko Hira, with its headquarters in Nihombashi, Tokyo, Japan.

== Brands under HMI ==
There are Seven sub-brands that are presently existing under the HMI group. These hotels are categorized based on the facilities they offer.

1. Hotel Crown Palais
2. Hotel Pearl City
3. Creston Hotel
4. Resort Ryokan
5. Sea Park Hotel Green Park Hotel
6. Hotel wellness
7. Top Wellness

== Hotels ==
HMI Hotel Group, known in Japan as Hotel Management International Co., Ltd., was established in 1998, and manages about 60 resort and business hotels in Japan.

- Hotel Pearl City Sapporo, Sapporo
- Hotel Pearl City Sendai, Sendai
- Shibuya Creston Hotel, Tokyo
- Nagoya Creston Hotel, Nagoya
- Hotel Pearl City Kobe, Kobe, where the company is headquartered
- Crown Palais Kitakyushu, Kitakyushu
- Rizzan Sea-Park Hotel Tancha-Bay, Onna, Okinawa

== Owned by Ryuko Hira ==
HMI Hotel Group is owned by Ryuko Hira. He was born in Jaipur, Rajasthan, India, in 1948. After trading in gemstones and precious metals in Tokyo, he married a Japanese woman, became a naturalized Japanese citizen, and adopted a Japanese name, Ryūko Hira (Japanese: 比良竜虎).

In 1991 Hira established the Hotel Pearl City Kobe, which also serves as HMI Hotel Group's headquarters. Since that time, he has mainly bought the operating rights of existing hotels. He also is one of the directors of Japan-India Association, Tokyo.
