= Foreign relations of Iraq =

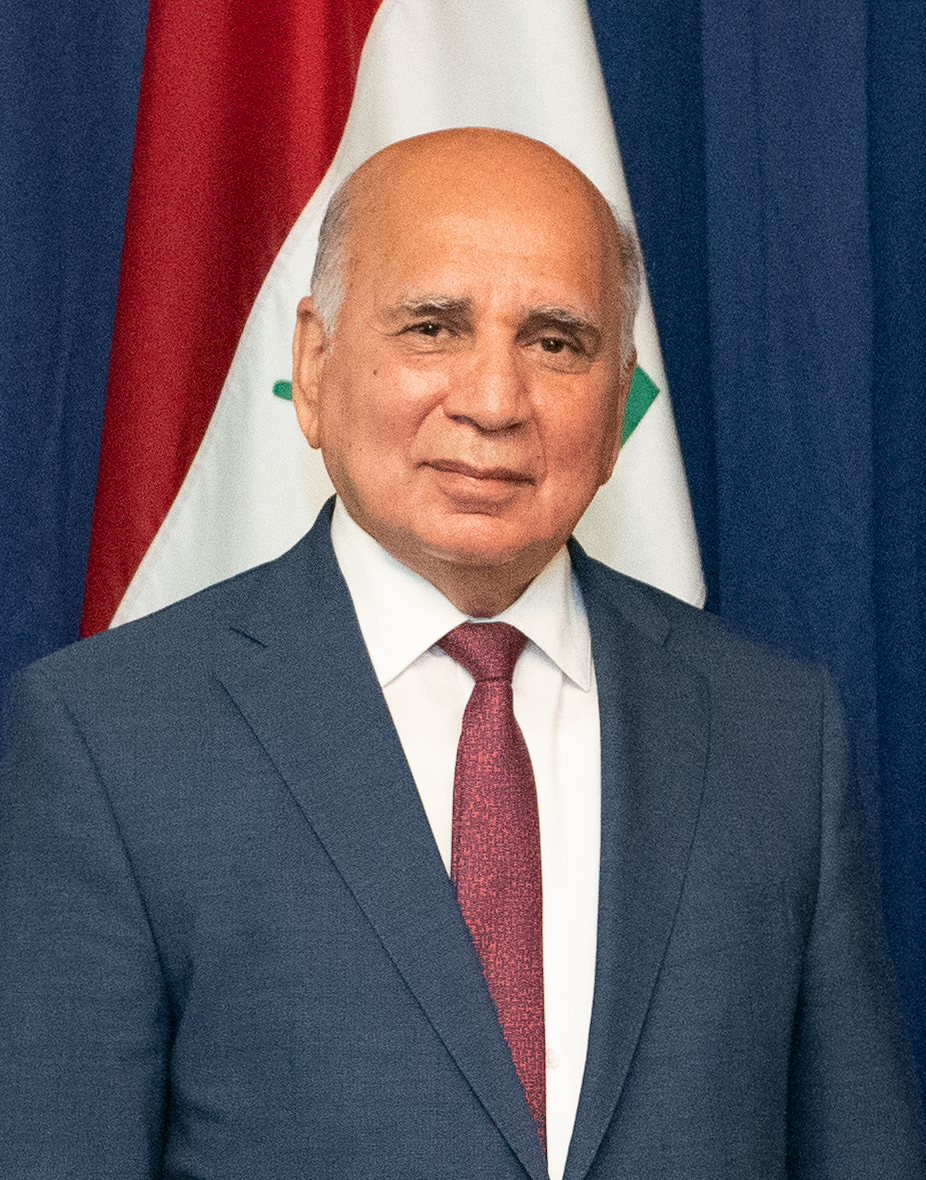
Fuad Hussein, Iraqi Minister of Foreign Affairs since June 2020.

The foreign relations of Iraq are the international relations maintained by the Republic of Iraq since its independence from Ottoman rule proclaimed in 1921. Iraq was a British protectorate under a mandate from the League of Nations between 1921 and 1932, then effectively gained its independence with the 1958 revolution which overthrew the pro-Western royal family and established the Republic.

Iraq is a member of the United Nations, the Arab League (of which it is a founding member) since 1945, the Organization of the Petroleum Exporting Countries (of which it is also a founding member) since 1960, and the Organisation of Islamic Cooperation since 1976. The international trade embargo on Iraq between 1990 and 2003 in retaliation for the invasion of Kuwait by Saddam Hussein allowed it to relatively spare its oil reserves compared to other countries in the region. Like Saudi Arabia, one of its other major resources is the presence of Islamic holy sites on its territory which attracts millions of pilgrims each year (mainly Iranians): the shrine of Ali in Najaf and the city of Karbala.

The Iraqi Minister of Foreign Affairs is Fuad Hussein, since June 2020. This position is strategic for Iraq, which largely depends on its foreign relations for its economy and security, after being the scene of a particularly violent civil war between 2013 and 2017.

But Iraq is also a battleground between foreign powers vying to extend their influence in the Middle East, mainly Iran, the United States, Turkey, and to a lesser extent, Saudi Arabia. Unlike Syria, its bordering neighbor, these foreign powers avoid military confrontations on Iraqi soil (with the notable exception of the elimination of the Iranian general Qasem Soleimani by an American strike in Baghdad in 2020) and prefer political and commercial struggles.

Thus, the formation of various Iraqi governments is often the result of a compromise integrating Iranian, American, and Turkish concerns, ensuring that Iraq's foreign policy will not be unfavorable to them. It must also be representative of its multi-ethnic and multi-denominational population, while the Shiite sectarianism of Nouri al-Maliki, Prime Minister from 2006 to 2014, is considered one of the main causes of the second Iraqi civil war. This war saw, like the 1991 Gulf War, the intervention in Iraq of a vast international military coalition led by the United States, this time in support of the Iraqi government, which allowed it to regain control of the entire territory in 2017.

Since then, Iraq has gradually pursued its global reintegration, being the subject of several international conferences in August 2021 and December 2022 aimed at supporting Baghdad on economic, diplomatic, and security levels. Several Arab and Western countries participate, while this summit also aims to promote dialogue between regional stakeholders.

== Chronology of relations ==
=== 1932 to 1958 ===
In 1921, the British, victors of the Mesopotamian campaign (Iraqi theater of World War I), established a protectorate over Iraq which they transformed into a constitutional monarchy and installed the Hashemite dynasty in power. Despite its independence officially obtained in 1932, Iraq remained a satellite state of the United Kingdom which continued to exert its influence via the royal family favorable to i.t

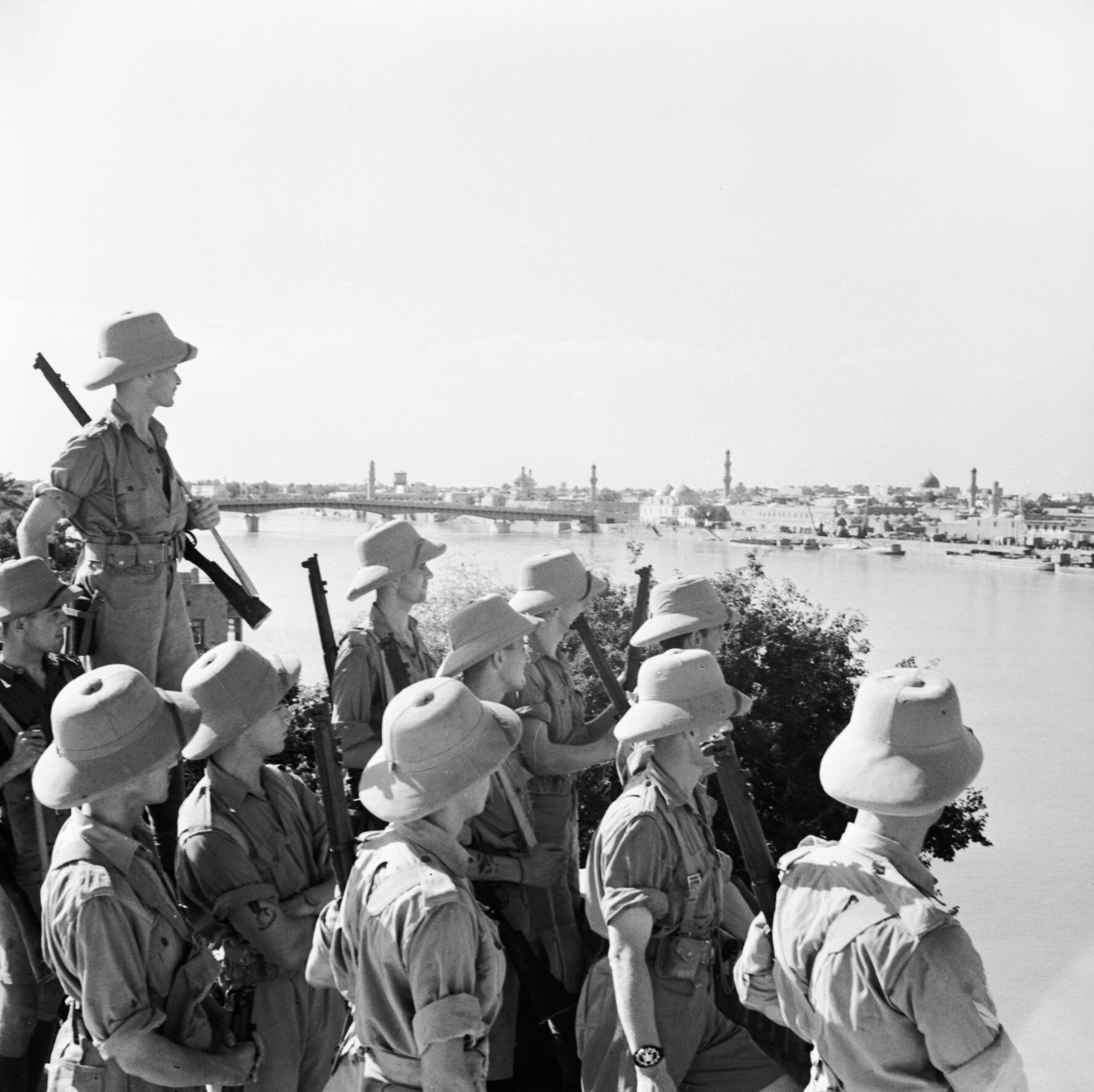
British soldiers participating in the Anglo-Iraqi War in 1941.

At the beginning of World War II, the former Prime Minister Rashid Ali al-Gaylani overthrew the pro-British Prime Minister in place Nuri al-Said by a coup d'état, and acceded to power. He oriented the kingdom's policy towards neutrality, then towards rapprochement with the Axis powers, provoking the Anglo-Iraqi War, then the reoccupation of Iraq by the victorious British. After World War II, violent strikes shook Kirkuk, where protesters denounced working conditions, as well as British domination over oil exploitation. Tensions degenerated further when Prime Minister Salih Jabr signed a new treaty with London (supposedly more favorable to Iraq) in 1948, leading to increasing repression by the government. The same year, the Iraqi army joined the Arab coalition led by Egypt against Israel during the 1948 Arab–Israeli War, and conquered the regions of Jenin and Nablus, before being repelled by a counter-offensive that led to Israel's victory.

In 1955, Nuri al-Said, recalled by the monarchy to the post of Prime Minister, reaffirmed Iraq's pro-Western foreign policy by signing the Baghdad Pact, a military alliance established by Great Britain and integrating former British colonies in the Middle East, as well as Turkey. The year 1956 was marked by the Suez Crisis in Egypt, a Franco-British military intervention aimed at regaining control of the Suez Canal nationalized by Egyptian President Gamal Abdel Nasser. This crisis provoked strong hostility from local populations towards the former colonial powers in the region, while the success achieved by Nasser against this Western interference inspired Arab nationalists.

On 1 February 1958, Syria and Egypt united to create the United Arab Republic. In reaction, two weeks later, on 14 February 1958, Iraq and Jordan whose kings Faisal II and Hussein are cousins, united in turn and founded the Arab Federation of Iraq and Jordan.

=== 1958 to 1968 ===
In July 1958, a political crisis erupted in Lebanon resulting from tensions between the pro-Western government and its political opponents inspired by Nasser, eager to join the United Arab Republic. Neighboring Jordan feeling threatened, requested military support from the Iraqi government, which sent the 2nd armored division from Diwaniyah towards Amman. But the Nasserist officer Abd al-Salam Arif who commanded this division decided to turn back on the night of 13 July 1958 to 14 July 1958, and upon returning to Baghdad, attacked the royal palace with the help of Abd al-Karim Qasim, co-organizer of the coup d'état. Prime Minister Nuri al-Said and the royal family were massacred (despite the latter's quick surrender), after which the putschists proclaimed the Republic of Iraq, and the dissolution of the Arab Federation of Iraq and Jordan.

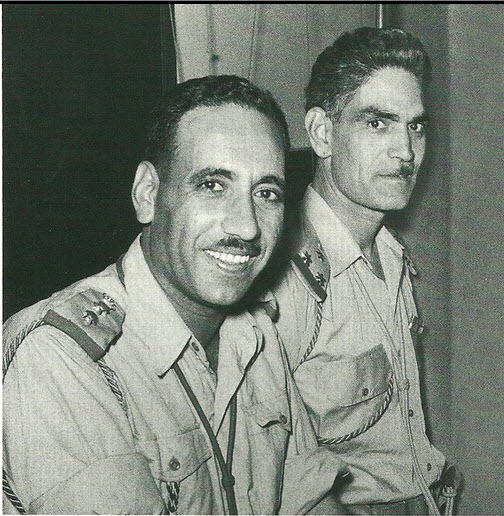
Officers Abd al-Karim Qasim and Abd al-Salam Arif, leaders of the 1958 Iraqi revolution.

In the following years, the newly proclaimed Republic based its regime on Arab socialism and reoriented its foreign policy towards the Eastern Bloc allowing several communist countries, including the Soviet Union and the People's Republic of China, to open embassies in Baghdad. While withdrawing from the Baghdad Pact (whose headquarters was moved to Ankara) in March 1959, Abd al-Karim Qasim in power in Iraq maintained close ties with London and the United States, which accommodated his rapprochement with the Soviet Union. An Iraqi delegation went to Moscow as early as 16 March 1959.

Domestically, Abd al-Karim Qasim and Abd al-Salam Arif shared power and the main ministries, but tension soon erupted between nationalists favorable to Iraq's independence, and Nasserists favorable to its attachment to the United Arab Republic. In December 1958, Abd al-Salam Arif (Nasserist) was arrested and imprisoned on the order of the Prime Minister, his former brother-in-arms Abd al-Karim Qasim (independentist), provoking tensions with Egypt of Gamal Abdel Nasser. These were accentuated in June 1961 by an Iraqi project to annex Kuwait, a small oil-rich emirate southeast of Iraq, condemned by Egypt, Lebanon, Jordan, Tunisia, the United States, Iran, and Japan. In retaliation for these international condemnations, Abd al-Karim Qasim broke Iraq's diplomatic relations with these states. Great Britain kept 5,000 soldiers in Kuwait (supposed to withdraw upon its independence in 1961), replaced the following months by a multinational Arab force initiated by Nasser, pushing Abd al-Karim Qasim to abandon his invasion project. In February 1963, the latter was overthrown and executed following a coup d'état by the Ba'ath Party, which placed his rival Abd al-Salam Arif in the presidency, a position he held until his accidental death three years later. His brother Abd al-Rahman Arif succeeded him, but remained in power for only two years.

=== 1968 to 2003 ===
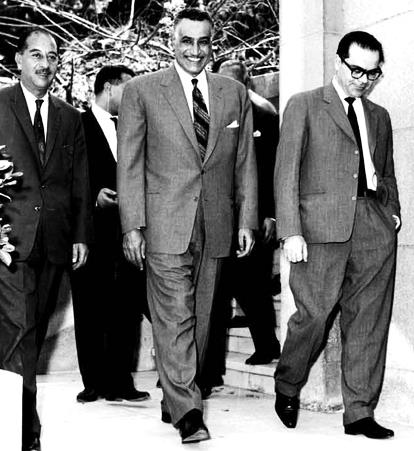
Iraqi Prime Minister Ahmed Hassan al-Bakr accompanied by Egyptian and Syrian presidents Gamal Abdel Nasser and Lu'ay al-Atassi, 1963.

The year 1968 was marked by a new Ba'ath Party coup d'état, led by Ahmed Hassan al-Bakr, former Prime Minister of Abd al-Salam Arif (from February to November 1963) and Saddam Hussein, who in turn shared power, the first as president, the second as vice-president. From then on, Saddam Hussein remained at the head of Iraq (of which he became President in 1979) for 35 years until his overthrow by the American invasion in 2003. Under his governance, Iraq became a regional power, partly thanks to oil revenues and support from Western countries, Arabs, and the Eastern Bloc. For in 1973, Iraq participated in the consultation of oil-producing countries which caused a quadrupling of the barrel price, while this agreement facilitated the integration of the new Iraqi regime into the Arab world.

In 1979, as Saddam Hussein acceded to the presidency, Iran found itself diplomatically isolated after the Islamic Revolution, while Iraq, perceived as a stabilizing force for the region, was supported by France, the United States, the Soviet Union, and Arab powers such as Saudi Arabia and Egypt. Benefiting from significant financial and material support, Saddam Hussein attacked Iran to annex part of its territory and oil resources in September 1980. Although supplied in large quantities with weapons and technologies, the Iraqi army bogged down and the Iran–Iraq War ended after eight years in August 1988, without a winner, but with a human toll of several hundred thousand victims. After the war, Saddam Hussein pursued his foreign policy towards Arab states, by creating an Arab Cooperation Council composed of Iraq, Jordan, Egypt, and North Yemen.

Two years later, ruined by its military expenditures and accusing Kuwait, one of its main creditors, of having stolen oil from it by horizontal drilling, Saddam Hussein decided, like his predecessor Abd al-Karim Qasim 30 years earlier, to invade the small Emirate. This invasion changed Iraq's relations with the Arab world and the West, which formed a military coalition led by the United States and repelled the Iraqi army during the Gulf War. Again militarily defeated and diplomatically isolated, Iraq saw UN-imposed economic sanctions which severely deteriorated the living conditions of its population, but these were alleviated by the "Oil for Food" program aimed at meeting its humanitarian needs. From March 1997, Iraq resumed its diplomatic and commercial relations with the West and the Arab states of the region, except for Kuwait and Saudi Arabia.

=== 2003 to present day ===
In 2003, a joint offensive by the United States and Great Britain in Iraq caused the overthrow of Saddam Hussein (executed in 2006), replaced by a Shiite government favorable to Iran and a strategic ally of the United States.

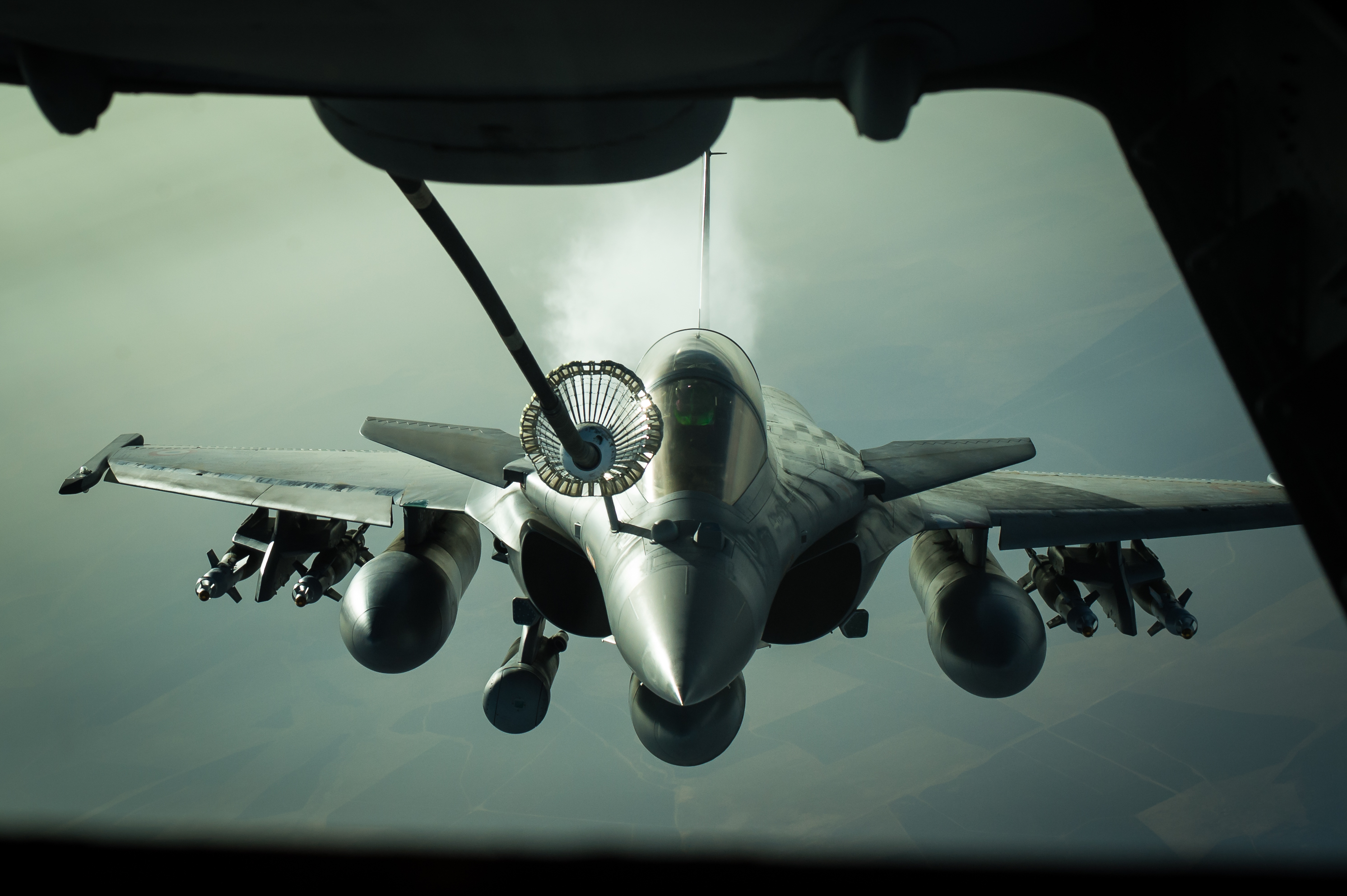
Refueling of a French Rafale over Iraq during the war against the Islamic State in October 2016.

This regime change provoked a series of insurrections, notably two civil wars (from 2006 to 2009 then from 2013 to 2017), the second, particularly deadly, marked by the takeover of a large part of Iraqi territory by the jihadist group "Islamic State" in 2014. Following this lightning advance by the jihadists, a vast Arab-Western coalition formed again, this time in support of the Iraqi government, and allowed the reconquest of most of the territories lost by the Iraqi army by the end of 2017. Since then, Iraq, again faced with the challenge of pacification and reconstruction of the territory, is torn by its contradictory alliance with Iran on one hand, and the United States on the other, these two countries being enemies since the 1979 Iranian revolution.

The beginning of the year 2021 was marked by the historic visit of Pope Francis to Iraq, followed worldwide, and focused on reconciliation and interfaith dialogue. This papal visit was unanimously welcomed by the Iraqi political class, as well as by the United States, France, Iran, the Lebanese Hezbollah (pro-Iran), and the UN. In August of the same year, Iraqi Prime Minister Mustafa Al-Kadhimi organized a regional summit in Baghdad also including France, where representatives from Saudi Arabia, United Arab Emirates, Kuwait, Qatar, Iran, Turkey, Egypt, and Jordan were invited. The stated objective was to defuse tensions in the region and reach agreements on pressing issues such as the Yemeni civil war, the economic and social crisis in Lebanon, maritime security, or the scarcity of water in the region.

In November 2021, Mustafa al-Kadhimi was the victim of a drone assassination attempt at his residence in Baghdad, injuring several members of his security staff, whose perpetrators remain unknown. This triggered a broad wave of international solidarity, with several dozen foreign governments, Arab, Asian and Western bringing their support to the Iraqi Prime Minister, illustrating Iraq's reintegration into the international community.

In October 2022, the Iraqi parliament designated Mohammed Shia' Al Sudani as the new Prime Minister. In foreign policy, the latter declared "not to want to adopt the policy of axes, instead pursuing a policy of friendship and cooperation with everyone" while not allowing "Iraq to be a base from which other countries are attacked". Researcher Lahib Higel from the International Crisis Group predicted that Mr. Sudani would seek, like his predecessor, "a balance between the West and Iran", especially since Iraq, exhausted by years of crises and wars, has a "need for foreign investments in various sectors". In December 2022, the second "Baghdad Conference" opened in Amman, capital of Jordan, following that of August 2021, aimed at supporting Iraq on economic, diplomatic, and security levels. Several Arab and Western countries participated: the countries of the Gulf Cooperation Council, as well as Jordan which hosted this summit, Egypt, Iran, Turkey, as well as France and the European Union represented by its foreign policy chief Josep Borrell.

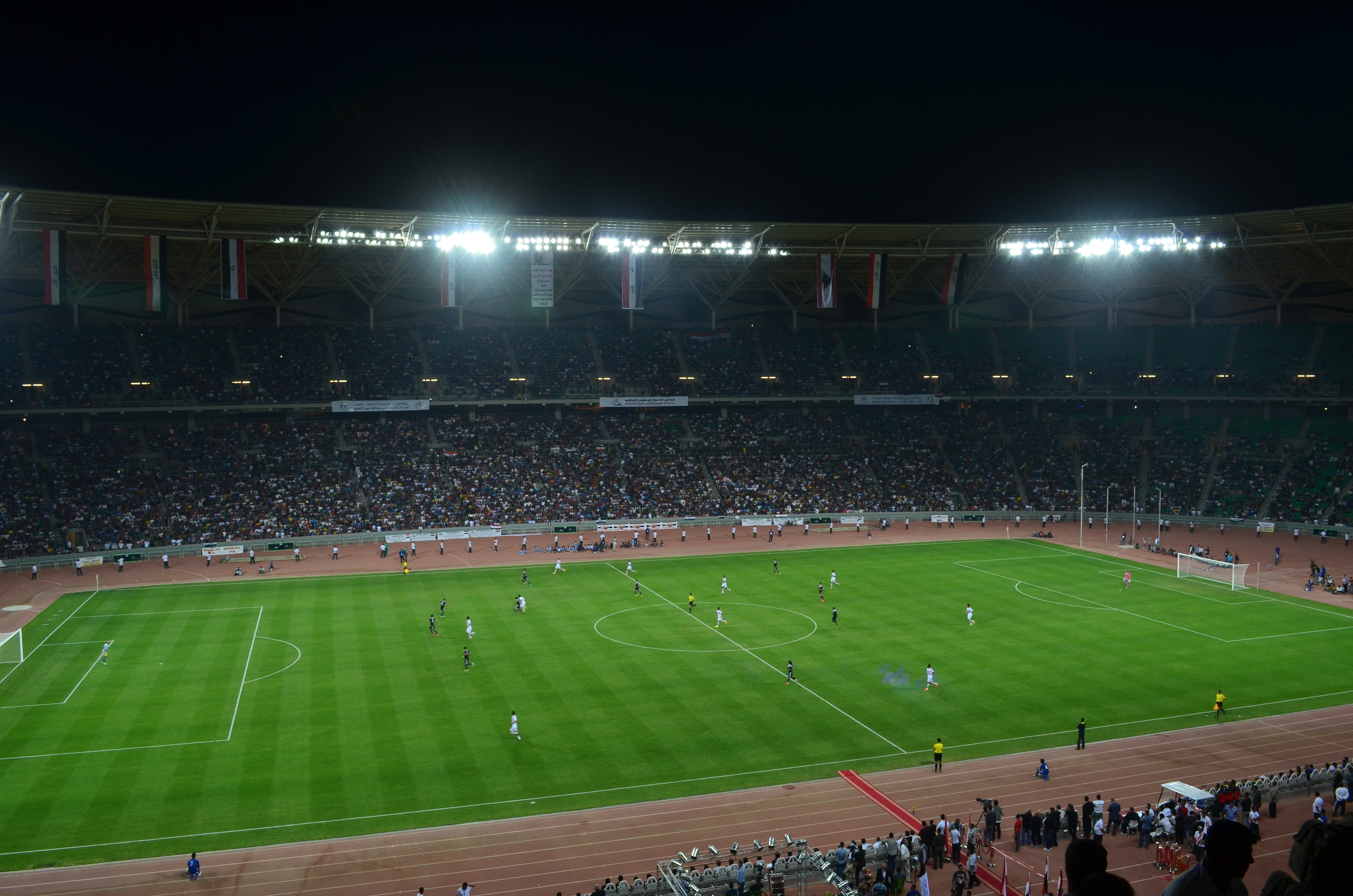
Basra International Stadium which hosted the final of the 2023 Arabian Gulf Cup won by the Iraq national football team.

In January 2023, Iraq organized and won the Arabian Gulf Cup, in the coastal city of Basra, in the southeast of the country. This event had strong symbolic importance, as security obstacles had prevented Iraq from organizing it since 1979, the year preceding the Iran–Iraq War, which was followed by the Gulf War, the 1990s embargo, the American invasion, and the two Iraqi civil wars. It should also be noted that the Iraqi national football team was, due to the invasion of Kuwait, excluded between 1990 and 2004 from this competition in which seven other Arab countries participate: Oman, Saudi Arabia, Qatar, United Arab Emirates, Yemen, Bahrain, and Kuwait. Following the victory of the Iraqi team in the final of this competition (against the Oman team), the Iraqi media Kitabat declared that this success must "be a turning point in Iraq's relationship with its Arab environment" and "reduce foreign influences to zero".

In March 2023, the Secretary-General of the United Nations António Guterres went to Baghdad at a time when Iraq was commemorating the 20th anniversary of the fall of Saddam Hussein's regime. He hailed the "central" role of Iraq for "regional stability" and "the government's commitment to advancing dialogue and diplomacy". The following week, the director of UNESCO Audrey Azoulay, went to Iraq to visit reconstruction sites and discuss culture and education with Iraqi officials. She was received upon her arrival in Baghdad by President Abdul Latif Rashid and Prime Minister Mohammed Shia' Al Sudani, before going to Mosul, then Erbil, while Iraq, cradle of ancient civilizations, has six sites listed as UNESCO World Heritage.

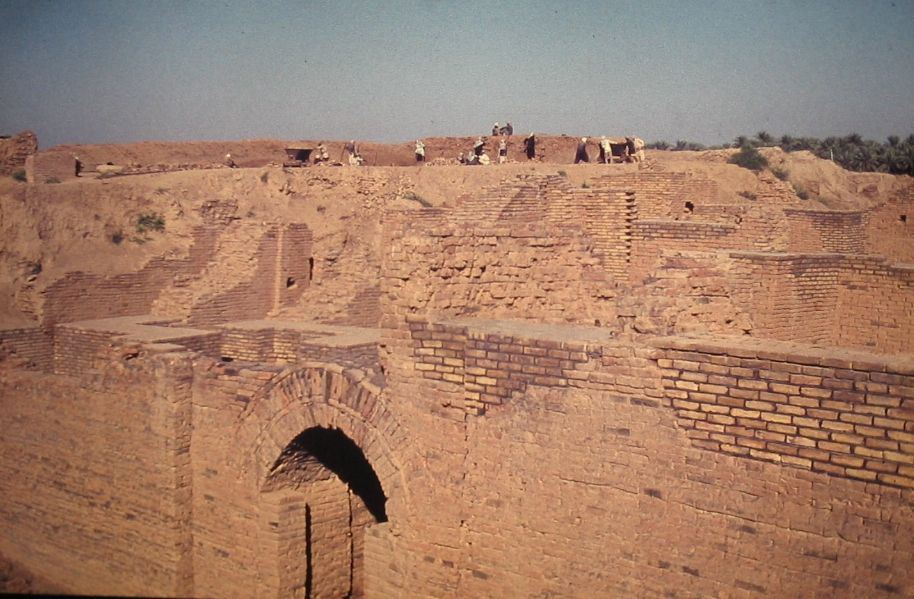
Ancient city of Babylon in central Iraq, listed as a UNESCO World Heritage Site.

In spring and summer 2023, foreign investment projects multiplied in Iraq, mainly from the Arab Gulf countries, marking a positive turning point for Baghdad, whose economy has been very dependent on Iran since 2003. In May, Baghdad presented a project to build a 1,200 km corridor including a road and a railway to connect the Gulf to Turkey: the "Iraq Development Road" project. These structures are intended to place Iraq on the global transport route by capitalizing on its geographical position and developing interdependence between the countries of the region. Its purpose is to transport goods from the Iraqi port of al-Faw to European markets via Turkey. This project plans the construction of about fifteen stations and should serve Qatar, United Arab Emirates, Kuwait, Syria, Oman, Jordan, Turkey, Iran, and Saudi Arabia. Three months later, the Iraqi Prime Minister kicked off the construction works of the first railway line connecting Iraq to the neighboring Iran's rail network: the "Basra-Shalamcheh connection project". In April 2024, a memorandum of understanding launching the "Iraq Development Road" project was signed in Baghdad by the Iraqi and Turkish heads of state, as well as the transport ministers of four concerned countries: Iraq, Turkey, United Arab Emirates, and Qatar.

In September 2024, Iraq obtained the departure of part of the American troops stationed on its territory to fight the Islamic State, within about a year. Farhad Alaeddine, advisor to the Iraqi Prime Minister for Foreign Affairs, declared:

We are now on the verge of taking relations between Iraq and the members of the international coalition to another level, focusing on bilateral relations in military, security, economic, and cultural fields.

At the same time, Baghdad expelled UN officials responsible for investigating the Yazidi genocide committed by the organization.

In December, the fall of the Syrian regime favorable to Baghdad and Tehran, overthrown by a coalition of Sunni rebels, put the Iraqi government in an awkward position, as Iraqi fighters had come to its aid, in vain. The end of the Assad reign in Syria reshuffles the regional cards (notably cutting the Shiite corridor Tehran-Baghdad-Damascus-Beirut), and forces the Iraqi government to position itself towards its new neighboring interlocutors, at the risk of compromising certain internal balances. Moreover, Iraqi officials having noted the speed with which Iran abandoned Bashar al-Assad and the speed with which his regime collapsed, are encouraged to reevaluate their own dependence on Tehran. Iraq could thus conform to the American will to distance itself from its Iranian neighbor, especially since the return of Donald Trump to the presidency of the United States will probably multiply the efforts to curb Iranian strike force.

== Diplomatic relations ==
List of countries which Iraq maintains diplomatic relations with by date:

#	Country	Date
1	Turkey	16 January 1928
2	Iran	25 April 1929
3	United States	30 March 1931
4	Saudi Arabia	7 April 1931
5	Italy	1931
6	United Kingdom	4 October 1932
7	Afghanistan	20 December 1932
8	Poland	22 December 1932
9	Czech Republic	16 November 1933
10	Sweden	18 May 1934
11	Austria	October 1934
12	Netherlands	10 May 1935
13	Japan	10 March 1939
14	Russia	16 May 1941
15	Lebanon	24 February 1944
16	Syria	11 February 1945
17	Chile	31 December 1945
18	Argentina	10 April 1946
19	Switzerland	1 May 1946
20	Norway	28 September 1946
21	France	24 November 1946
22	Belgium	5 December 1946
23	Jordan	24 May 1947
24	Greece	27 November 1947
25	Pakistan	1947
26	Ethiopia	14 September 1949
27	Indonesia	27 February 1950
28	Venezuela	22 June 1950
29	Spain	5 August 1950
30	Mexico	25 September 1950
31	Luxembourg	12 March 1952
32	India	10 November 1952
33	Germany	19 September 1953
34	Denmark	3 November 1953
35	Libya	21 May 1955
36	Sudan	3 May 1956
37	Thailand	24 May 1956
38	Myanmar	23 July 1956
39	Morocco	12 September 1956
40	Serbia	23 July 1958
41	Egypt	2 August 1958
42	Albania	14 August 1958
43	Bulgaria	14 August 1958
44	Romania	14 August 1958
45	China	25 August 1958
46	Hungary	30 August 1958
47	Finland	15 May 1959
48	Tunisia	1959
49	Cuba	5 April 1960
50	Ghana	21 April 1960
51	Sri Lanka	22 February 1961
52	Yemen	7 March 1961
53	Canada	27 June 1961
54	Nigeria	6 September 1961
55	Mongolia	5 February 1962
56	Portugal	8 February 1963
57	Kuwait	10 January 1964
58	Ireland	15 January 1964
59	Guinea	18 October 1964
—	Holy See	26 August 1966
60	Somalia	17 October 1966
61	Brazil	1 December 1967
—	North Korea (suspended)	30 January 1968
62	Vietnam	10 July 1968
63	Nepal	30 October 1968
64	Chad	10 February 1969
65	Kenya	14 April 1969
66	Mauritania	1 September 1969
67	Algeria	15 July 1971
68	Maldives	15 September 1971
69	Malta	3 December 1971
70	United Arab Emirates	1971
71	Bahrain	18 January 1972
72	Central African Republic	January 1972
73	Qatar	6 March 1972
74	Bangladesh	8 July 1972
75	Malaysia	6 April 1973
76	Tanzania	15 April 1973
77	Cyprus	22 June 1973
78	Uganda	25 July 1973
79	Australia	2 December 1973
80	Trinidad and Tobago	17 January 1974
81	Ecuador	10 February 1974
82	Guyana	22 September 1974
83	Zambia	1974
84	Philippines	12 January 1975
85	Jamaica	30 January 1975
86	Senegal	30 March 1975
87	Mozambique	25 June 1975
88	Laos	2 October 1975
89	Peru	11 October 1975
90	New Zealand	6 November 1975
91	Guinea-Bissau	9 December 1975
92	Cameroon	1975
93	Oman	7 January 1976
94	Mauritius	22 March 1976
95	Madagascar	26 March 1976
96	Comoros	1 June 1976
97	Panama	8 June 1976
98	Papua New Guinea	27 August 1977
99	Singapore	27 December 1977
100	Cape Verde	9 January 1978
101	Cambodia	10 January 1978
102	Guatemala	2 February 1978
103	Suriname	25 February 1978
104	Djibouti	11 March 1978
105	Iceland	20 April 1978
106	Colombia	1 January 1979
107	Mali	5 September 1980
108	Burundi	27 September 1980
109	Liberia	1980
110	Saint Lucia	1980
111	Saint Vincent and the Grenadines	1980
112	Seychelles	17 February 1981
113	Costa Rica	March 1981
114	Zimbabwe	June 1981
115	Uruguay	13 October 1981
116	Barbados	17 December 1981
117	Grenada	24 January 1982
118	Gambia	16 February 1982
119	Sierra Leone	23 June 1982
120	Burkina Faso	16 August 1982
121	Antigua and Barbuda	14 September 1982
122	Lesotho	1982
123	Belize	25 January 1983
124	Botswana	10 July 1986
125	South Korea	9 July 1989
126	Benin	24 July 1989
127	Nicaragua	26 November 1989
—	State of Palestine	1989
128	Brunei	1 May 1990
129	Namibia	3 July 1990
130	Azerbaijan	30 March 1992
131	Ukraine	16 December 1992
132	Slovakia	1 January 1993
133	Uzbekistan	19 June 1993
134	Kazakhstan	14 September 1995
135	Tajikistan	30 November 1995
136	Belarus	26 December 1996
137	Togo	9 January 1997
138	South Africa	25 August 1998
139	Armenia	12 February 2000
140	Latvia	15 October 2004
141	Croatia	4 January 2005
142	Estonia	22 April 2005
143	Slovenia	29 April 2005
144	North Macedonia	10 June 2005
145	Lithuania	19 January 2006
146	Bosnia and Herzegovina	7 March 2006
147	Georgia	14 September 2007
148	Turkmenistan	31 July 2009
149	Dominican Republic	27 May 2010
150	Montenegro	29 December 2010
151	San Marino	9 December 2011
152	Angola	21 February 2014
153	Fiji	12 August 2014
154	Kyrgyzstan	5 November 2015
155	Malawi	27 June 2024
156	Bolivia	26 July 2024
157	Moldova	6 August 2026
158	Democratic Republic of the Congo	Unknown
159	Republic of the Congo	Unknown
160	Gabon	Unknown
161	Ivory Coast	Unknown
162	Niger	Unknown

== Relations with West and Central Asian countries ==
=== Relations with Iran ===
==== Relations prior to the 1979 Iranian Revolution ====
Marked by mutual influences and conflicts, relations between Iraq and Iran are among the oldest between two neighboring civilizations. In the Sumerian Babylonian era, Iran was subject to the first Iraqi empires, and religions prior to monotheistic cults left a deep imprint there. Subsequently, the rise of the Persian Empire led in 639 BC to the occupation of Babylon. A few years after the Hijrah, these lands, Iraqi first, then Iranian, yielded to the first Muslim conquests before entering the fold of the Abbasid Caliphate encompassing Persia, the Arabian Peninsula and the Maghreb, with Baghdad as capital. The border between Iran and Iraq was drawn at the beginning of the 16th century with the emergence of the Safavid Empire on the current territory of Iran, while Iraq was integrated into the Ottoman Empire.

After World War I, while Iraq separated from the Ottoman Empire and became a British protectorate, Iran, feeling competed by this new national entity, was the only country to abstain from recognizing this new established state until 1929. From the 1930s, the two countries ultimately became allies, both governed by pro-Western monarchies, and signatories in 1955 to the Baghdad Pact, (from which Iraq withdrew in 1959 following the Iraqi revolution). At the beginning of the 1970s, however, the two states opposed each other during the Dhofar War (1964-1976), in which Iran intervened massively alongside the pro-British Sultan Qaboos bin Said from 1973, while the Ba'athist Iraqi regime supported the Marxist rebellion.

The border that currently separates Iraq and Iran as independent states measures 1,458 kilometers and was approved by the Algiers Agreements signed in 1975. The objective of this treaty is for Iraq to convince Iran to cease its support for Kurdish autonomists, in exchange for Iraq's recognition of the borders of the Shatt al-Arab (favorable to Iran). Deprived of Iranian support, the Kurds of Iraq lay down their arms and accept a peace agreement proposed a year earlier by the government.

In 1979, the Iranian monarchy was in turn overthrown by a popular uprising after which Saddam Hussein decided to renege on the Algiers Agreements and invade Iran.

==== Iran-Iraq War (1980–1988) ====
When Saddam Hussein attacked Iran in September 1980, he declared three conquest objectives: occupy the Shatt al-Arab (delta of the Tigris and Euphrates), the "river of the Arabs", which he had to share with Iran in 1975; make the Khalidj al-Farsi, the Persian Gulf, the Khalidj al-Arabi, the "Arabian Gulf", by driving the Iranians from the islets that control access to the Strait of Hormuz; seize the oil-rich province of Khuzestan, named by Arab nationalists, the Arabistan.

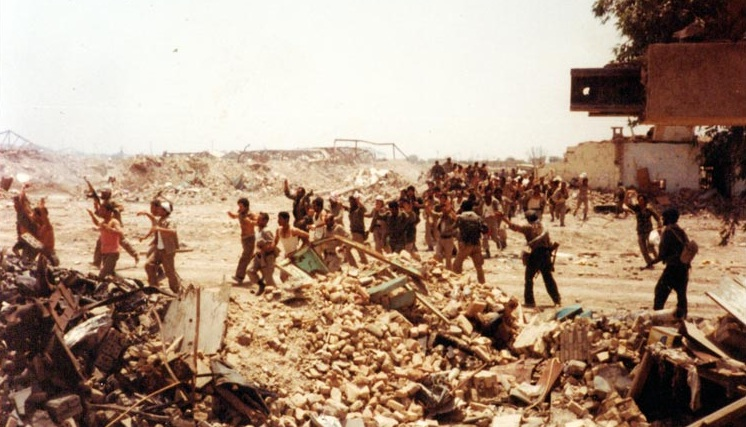
Capture of Iraqi soldiers after the recapture by the Iranians of Khorramshahr.

One can add to this Saddam Hussein's fear of seeing the revolution of Iran's Shiites spread to Iraq, where Shiite Muslims represent 60% of the population without being associated with the government, and are perceived as a threat by the power.

As early as 1982, noting the failure of his offensive, Baghdad tried to end the conflict, but the ceasefire was only accepted six years later by Iran under military pressure from the United States whose fleet was very present in the Gulf. The war thus ended in 1988 and resulted in a territorial status quo, but the Iraqi economy emerged in ruins, with an external debt of more than 70 billion dollars (half of which owed to the Gulf States), and a reconstruction cost estimated at 60 billion dollars. It also gave Iran the opportunity to establish influence over part of Iraqi society by welcoming, training, and enlisting opponents: the Kurds, and the Supreme Council for the Islamic Revolution in Iraq and its armed branch, and the Badr organization from which a large contingent of high-ranking Iraqi state officials today originate.

On 15 August 1990, Saddam Hussein, in turn diplomatically isolated following the invasion of Kuwait ten days earlier, renewed ties with Iran, and proposed to it the reapplication of the Algiers Agreement. The following year, Iran did not participate in the Gulf War, but hosted on its territory many Iraqi Shiite political organizations hostile to Saddam Hussein. Until the overthrow of Saddam Hussein in 2003, the border between Iran and Iraq remained officially closed although from 1991, the embargo imposed on Iraq by the UN increased smuggling with Iran already creating strong commercial interdependence between the two states yet still officially enemies.

In 2003, the Iraq War causing the fall of Saddam Hussein, allowed the two enemy neighbors to get closer and formalize very strong economic, political, and commercial relations.

==== Political and economic relations post-2003 ====
After 2003, Iraq's very low productivity destroyed by the war allowed Iran to find an unexpected commercial outlet there while its economy was in turn stifled by US economic sanctions imposed from 1995. Thus, between 2006 and 2016, annual trade exchanges between Iran and Iraq went from 1.6 billion to 18 billion dollars, with a trade balance largely favorable to Iran, making Iraq its "economic lung". Iraq exports to Iran dates, leather, and sulfur and imports from Iran cars, medical equipment, vegetables, construction materials, as well as fuel, gas, and electricity (imports from Iran representing one third of Iraqi consumption).

In parallel, after the overthrow of Saddam Hussein in 2003, Shiite-dominated governments favorable to Iran succeeded each other in Baghdad, creating the conditions for political rapprochement between the two countries. The warming of relations between the two countries materialized officially in March 2008 with the visit of Iranian President Mahmoud Ahmadinejad to Iraq. Of the six Iraqi Prime Ministers appointed between 2003 and 2020, three spent most of the 1980s in Iran, notably Nouri al-Maliki who held this post for eight years from 2006 to 2014. His pro-Iranian policy unfavorable to Sunni Muslims was considered in 2014 by many observers as one of the main reasons for the outbreak of the second Iraqi civil war in 2013, which forced him to resign in September 2014.

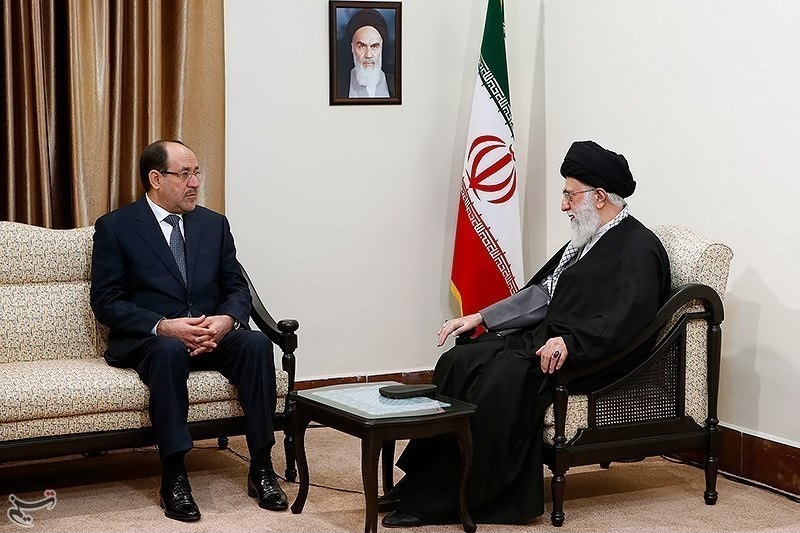
Meeting between Iraqi Prime Minister Nouri al-Maliki and Iranian Supreme Leader Ali Khamenei in Tehran in 2013.

In 2011, the withdrawal of Americans from Iraq gave Tehran access to Iraqi institutions, notably the intelligence services which previously worked with the Americans. Iran then has in Iraq eighteen offices and 5,700 rented accommodations to facilitate the work of Iranian intelligence agents.

In 2014, as political and economic instability in Iraq worsened with the civil war, Iran took charge of supplying Iraq with equipment and weapons and participated in the reconstruction of cities damaged by the war. The Iranian "Qods Forces" took advantage of this civil war to increase their influence by supporting the "Popular Mobilization Units" (Hachd al-Chaabi), which continued until the victory of the Iraqi government over the jihadists of the Islamic State in December 2017. The Iranian general and commander of the Qods Forces Qasem Soleimani personally directed offensives in several major battles of the conflict, notably during the siege of Amirli (2014), the battles of Tikrit (2014-2015). Baiji (2014-2015), and Fallujah (2016).

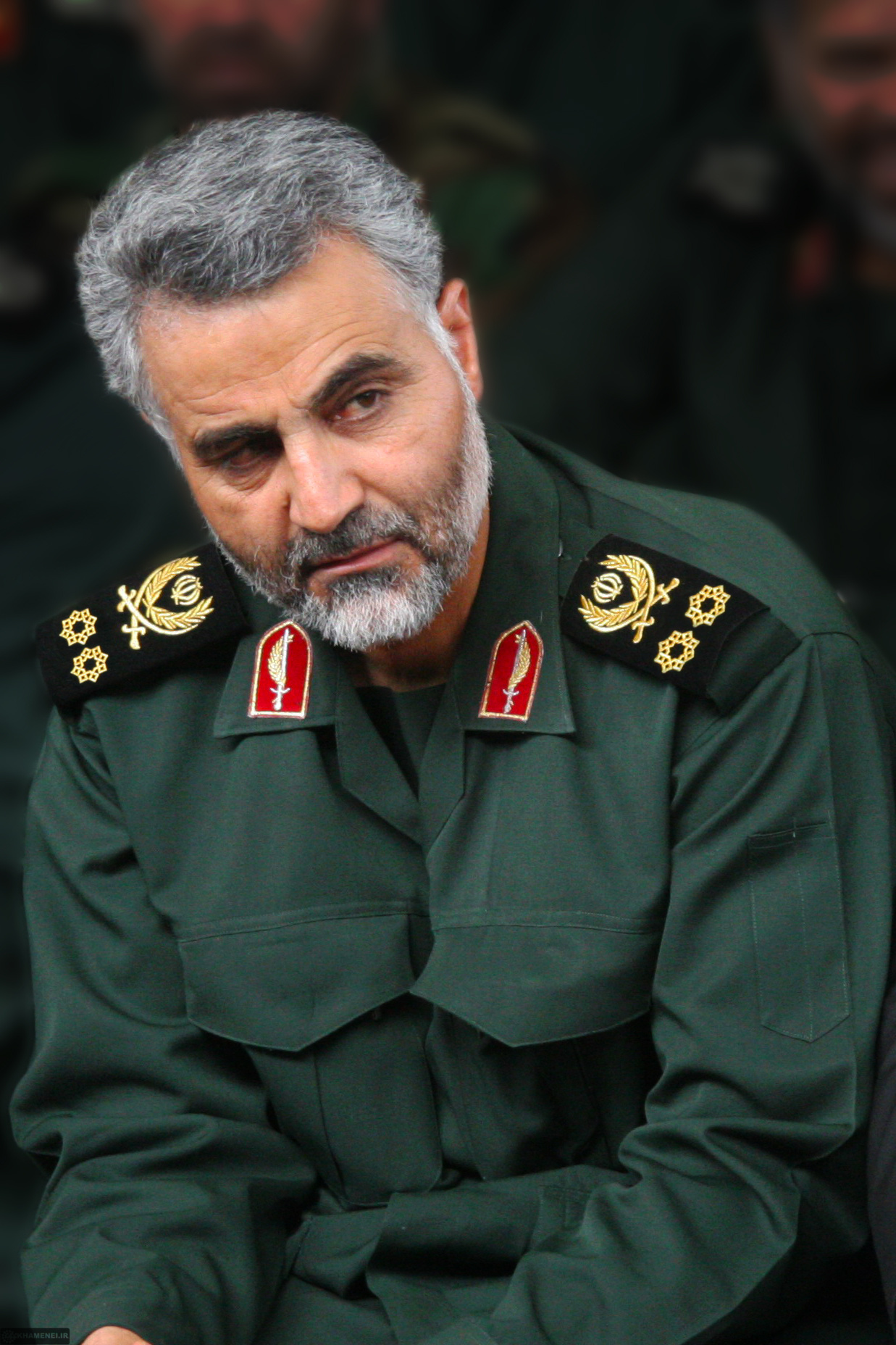
Iranian general Qasem Soleimani (1957–2020).

At the end of the second civil war in December 2017, the Iraqi government was again faced as after the 2003 war with the challenge of rebuilding the country and its economy, and further increased its economic dependence on Iran with which it multiplied trade agreements. On 11 March 2019, a year after the end of the civil war, Iranian President Hassan Rouhani went to Baghdad for a three-day visit, during which agreements were concluded between Iran and Iraq in several fields: oil, trade, health, education, and transport with the construction of a railway between Shalamcheh in Iran and Basra in Iraq. In addition, these agreements provided for the construction of joint industrial cities at the border for joint manufacturing production, as well as direct transport of goods. Finally, a symbolically strong aspect of these agreements was the reaffirmation of the 1975 Algiers Agreements on the border between the two states, the questioning of which by Saddam Hussein had been the cause of the Iran-Iraq War between 1980 and 1988.

In June 2020, the new Iraqi Prime Minister Mustafa Al-Kadhimi made his first trip abroad to Iran, where he met Ayatollah Ali Khamenei and President Hassan Rouhani. Their discussions focused on ways to strengthen trade ties, the fight against the COVID-19 pandemic (while Iran is one of the most affected countries), and on efforts to ensure regional stability. Hassan Rouhani declared during a joint press conference: "The two governments wish to expand bilateral relations to reach 20 billion dollars [in annual trade exchanges]". This volume of exchanges, twice that of 2019, would be possible in the event of the lifting of US sanctions on Iran, a prospect conceivable with the upcoming end of Donald Trump's term.

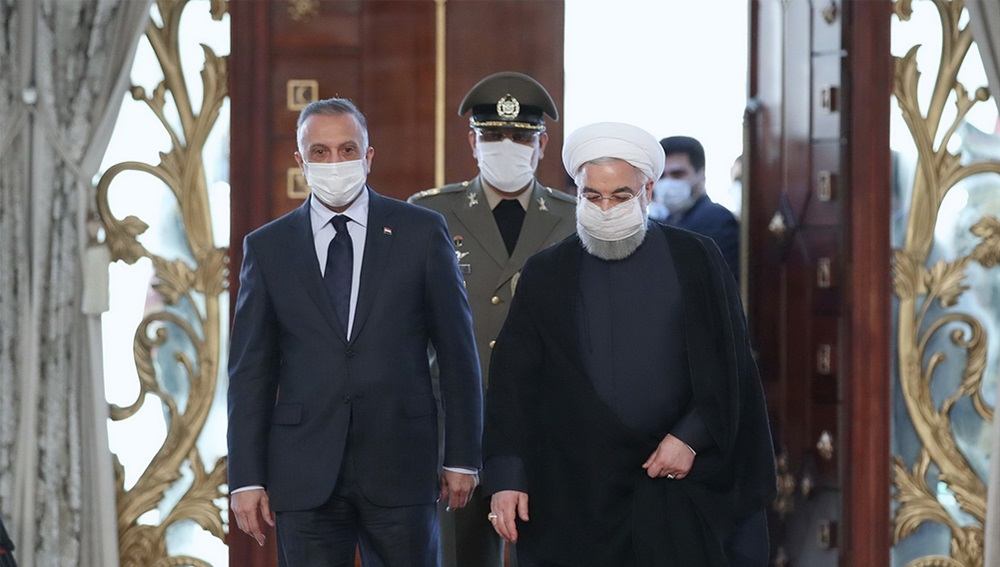
Meeting between Iraqi Prime Minister Mustafa Al-Kadhimi and Iranian President Hassan Rouhani in July 2020.

In February 2021, the foreign ministers of the two countries Javad Zarif and Fuad Hussein met in Tehran, in the presence of Hassan Rouhani and the secretary of the Iranian Supreme National Security Council, Ali Shamkhani. The Iranian representatives asked their Iraqi counterparts to expel US troops from their territory, calling their presence "detrimental", a year after the elimination in Baghdad by an American strike of the Iranian general Qasem Soleimani and the leader of the Iranian-backed Iraqi Shiite militias, Abu Mahdi al-Muhandis. Javad Zarif thanked the Iraqi justice for issuing on 7 January 2021, an arrest warrant against Donald Trump as part of the investigation into the elimination of Abu Mahdi al-Muhandis. In a context marked by the possibility of a resumption of dialogue between Washington and Tehran after the election of Joe Biden to the US presidency in November 2020, the officials also discussed strengthening economic ties, notably agreements on border markets, trade, transport of goods, debts, and banking issues.

In November 2022, Iraqi Prime Minister Mohammed Shia' Al Sudani went to Tehran a month after taking office to strengthen bilateral cooperation in all fields. He was welcomed with great pomp in Tehran by Iranian President Ebrahim Raisi as well as by Ayatollah Ali Khamenei, who had not received his predecessor Mustafa al-Kadhimi, deemed close to Washington and Riyadh during his two visits to Tehran. A contract worth 4 billion dollars was signed during this visit to allow Tehran to export technical and engineering services to Iraq, while the Iranian Ministry of Petroleum announced the opening of an office in Baghdad. In parallel, the new Iraqi government approved the creation of a public works company managed by the Hashd al-Shaabi, a paramilitary coalition of pro-Iran militias.

Randa Slim, senior researcher at the Middle East Institute, estimates that "Tehran is more positively oriented towards this Prime Minister than his predecessor, which could translate into more economic engagement". In September 2024, the new Iranian President Masoud Pezeshkian went to Iraq for his first visit abroad since his election, and met Mohammed Shia' Al Sudani. During this meeting, 14 memoranda of understanding were signed to strengthen cooperation between the two neighboring countries.

==== Limits ====
Despite these growing interactions between Iran and Iraq, these two countries are competitors on the international scene as producers and exporters of oil (but not for gas, Iran being an indispensable supplier for Iraq).The affinities between their governments do not reflect those between their populations, for whom despite the change in geopolitical context since the overthrow of Saddam Hussein, the war between Iran and Iraq from 1980 to 1988 continues to mark memories. Moreover, Iran's political and economic influence is very poorly experienced by the majority of the Iraqi population. In 2019, during the Iraqi protests of October, the protesters expressed their discontent by nicknaming the Iraqi leaders "the tentacles of Iran".

Iraqi Shiism competes with Iranian Shiism, and despite converging interests, the Ayatollah Sistani, the highest religious authority of Iraqi Shiism, is not aligned with the position of the Ayatollah Khamenei, although being himself of Iranian origin. His Iraqi Shiite rival Muqtada al-Sadr, particularly popular among the Iraqi population, is clearly appreciated for his "nationalist Shiism" considered a bulwark against foreign influences, American as well as Iranian.

Tehran has privileged links with Iraqi Kurdistan (particularly with the "Patriotic Union of Kurdistan"), which has several times manifested secessionist desires from Iraq. For its part, northern Iraq serves as a refuge for Iranian opposition groups: the PJAK, Iranian "affiliate" of the Kurdistan Workers' Party (PKK), the fighters of the Kurdistan Democratic Party of Iran, and the Iranian communist organization Komala.

In September 2022, the Guardians of the Revolution, the ideological army of the Iranian regime, bombarded northern Iraq accused of serving as a refuge for Iranian Kurdish separatist groups, in a context of large-scale protests in Iran after the murder of a Kurdish civilian by Iran's Guidance Patrol. If the armed Iranian opponents settled in northern Iraq do not take part in these protests, many protesters, on the other hand, cross the Iraqi border to enlist in these organizations. A month and a half later, northern Iraq was again bombarded by Iranian missiles and drones supposed to target Iranian Kurdish opposition groups. In mid-July 2023, the Iraqi Ministry of Interior announced the deployment of a brigade at the border with Iran in Iraqi Kurdistan, with a budget of more than seven million dollars, comprising some 50 surveillance towers and 40 cameras, to prevent infiltrations and smuggling.

In January 2024, Iran again bombarded Iraqi Kurdistan in retaliation for the attack in the Iranian city of Kerman claimed by the Islamic State which killed 84 people the previous week. These Iranian strikes killed at least 4 people in Erbil, including a Kurdish businessman close to Iraqi Kurdish Prime Minister Masrour Barzani. This attack aroused anger in Iraq, even among Shiites who are ordinarily rather aligned with the Islamic Republic. Iraq recalled its ambassador to Tehran Nassir Abdul Mohsen and filed a complaint with the UN Security Council, marking the strongest diplomatic tensions between Baghdad and Tehran since the overthrow of Saddam Hussein.

=== Relations with Turkey ===
==== History of Turkish-Iraqi relations ====
Relations between Turkey and Iraq are marked by the Ottoman Empire which included the two current states until its dismantling after World War I. After World War II, the two states were close allies, having notably been part of the Baghdad Pact in force between 1955 and 1978 (although Iraq withdrew in 1959). In 1973, Baghdad and Ankara concluded an agreement on Iraqi oil exports destined for Turkey. The Kirkuk–Ceyhan Oil Pipeline, put into service in 1977 to bypass a Syrian attempt to embargo its oil exports, allowed Iraq in 2014 to deliver up to 400,000 barrels of oil per day via Turkey, or a quarter of its oil exports. After the second Iraqi civil war (2013-2017), Iraq decided to build a second pipeline to the Turkish port of Ceyhan (from Baiji), due to damage caused by the Islamic State on the first.

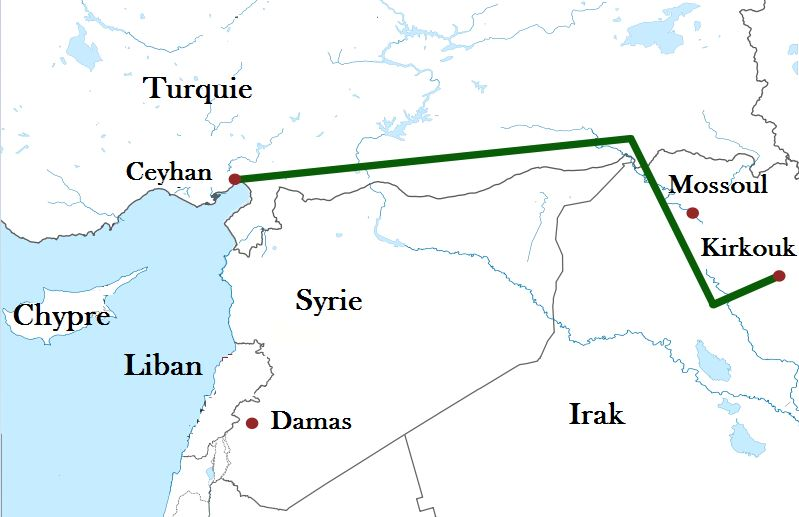
Route of the Kirkuk–Ceyhan Oil Pipeline, through which a quarter of Iraqi oil exports transit.

During the conflicts opposing Iran to Iraq, then Iraq to Kuwait, Turkey member of NATO and candidate to the European Union took the side of the Westerners supporting Iraq in 1980 then Kuwait in 1990, making the Incirlik Air Base available to the American and British armies. In 1991, Resolution 687 of the United Nations Security Council ended the Gulf War and opened the way to the autonomy of Iraqi Kurdistan, which became a refuge for the Kurdistan Workers' Party (PKK) against which the Turkish government has been at war since the beginning of the 1980s. From then on, the Turkish government got closer to the Iraqi authorities and Kurdistan to secure its border and conduct military operations against the PKK in northern Iraq. But this did not prevent Turkey from in turn serving as a refuge for hundreds of thousands of Iraqi Kurds repressed by the government during the Iraqi uprising of March 1991, while the Incirlik base served as a rotation point for the delivery of humanitarian aid.

In March 2003, Turkey opposed the American intervention in Iraq, during which Turkish deputies refused American soldiers access to the Incirlik base. The government nevertheless agreed six months later to reverse this prohibition, in exchange for which US President George W. Bush agreed to provide Turkey with information on the location of PKK Kurdish rebels in northern Iraq.

In November 2007 and December 2008, Iraqi Prime Minister Nouri al-Maliki went to Turkey where he discussed security cooperation between the two states calling on the PKK to "abandon the armed struggle and join the democratic process", as well as energy cooperation projects. In April 2009, the Iraqi Shiite leader Moqtada al-Sadr was in turn received by Turkish Prime Minister Recep Tayyip Erdogan. Between 2014 and 2018, Turkey closed its consulate in Mosul because of the taking hostage of its diplomats in this city by the Islamic State group.

In March 2023, Iraqi Prime Minister Mohammed Shia' Al Sudani went to Ankara where he met Turkish President Recep Tayyip Erdoğan on the drought in Iraq and the sharing of the waters of the rivers Tigris and Euphrates which both take their source in Turkey. While Baghdad regularly accuses Turkey of reducing the flow of waterways to Iraq because of dams built upstream, the Turkish president promised him to release more water into the Tigris. The following week, still in a trend of rapprochement and collaboration with Baghdad, Ankara announced its intention to stop oil imports from Iraqi Kurdistan, while the latter was in conflict with the Iraqi central government on the sharing of oil revenues. This Turkish decision was taken at the request of Iraq to force the Kurdish authorities to negotiate with the Iraqi government. The following week, an agreement was found between the Kurdistan Regional Government and that of Baghdad to resume oil exports via Turkey.

In August 2023, Turkish Foreign Minister Hakan Fidan went to Baghdad where he met his Iraqi counterpart Fuad Hussein. The files discussed between the two men are the distribution of the waters of the Tigris and Euphrates, the resumption of exports of oil from Iraqi Kurdistan to Turkey, and the fight against PKK bases, fought by Turkey in northern Iraq, even if Hakan Fidan declared on this subject "our common enemy must not poison our bilateral relations".

Hakan Fidan went again to Baghdad, and met again his Iraqi counterpart Fuad Hussein in March 2024. A delegation of high Turkish officials accompanied him for bilateral exchanges on the themes of security and energy. The following month, Turkish President Recep Tayyip Erdogan to Baghdad for his first state visit to Iraq in more than a decade, and met his Iraqi counterpart Abdul Latif Rashid and Prime Minister Mohammed Shia' Al Sudani. His visit focused on economic and security discussions, notably on the fight against the PKK in northern Iraq and the sharing of the waters of the rivers Tigris and Euphrates (which take their source in Turkey before crossing Iraqi territory. Also on the agenda, the "Development Road", a project of a corridor consisting of road and railway of 1,200 km to connect by 2030 the Gulf to Turkey passing through Iraq. On 17 March, Turkey announced an agreement with Iraq to double its electricity exports.

==== Turkish expansionism on Iraq ====
The former Ottoman domination over the current territory of Iraq explains regularly affirmed expansionist desires by the various Turkish governments on northern Iraq. The Iraqi city of Mosul is particularly the object of these territorial claims, notably:

in 1925, the vote of the League of Nations which attached the Mosul vilayet to Iraq rather than to Turkey was immediately contested by Mustafa Kemal Atatürk (first president of the Republic of Turkey), then his successors; in 1958, Turkey claimed it again when Iraq and Jordan united their two countries in the Arab Federation of Iraq and Jordan; in 1983, in the midst of the Iran–Iraq War, Turkish Prime Minister Turgut Özal claimed the city of Mosul in Turkey's zone of influence; in 1990, at the time of the invasion of Kuwait by Iraq, Turkey member of the international military coalition against Saddam Hussein tried to take advantage to annex the regions of Mosul and Kirkuk, but Washington opposed it; in 1994, President Süleyman Demirel evoked his desire to see "the border follow the foot of the mountains", which, in fact, included Mosul in Turkey; in 2004, Ankara claimed again the Mosul vilayet, this time taking advantage of the invasion of Iraq by the American army. It did not obtain it, but, three years later, obtained the right to conduct military operations in the north of the country;

in 2016, Turkish President Recep Tayyip Erdoğan tried to impose participation of the Turkish army in the Battle of Mosul to defend his "Turkmen, Arab, Kurdish compatriots", rejected by Iraqi Prime Minister Haider al-Abadi, who assimilated such an intervention to an "occupation" of Iraqi territory.

Furthermore, a contestation of the borders delimiting the states resulting from the Ottoman Empire also exists on the side of Iraq, which has claimed several times its sovereignty over Kuwait (1937, 1961, and 1990) because the latter was part of the Basra Vilayet.

==== Incursions of the Turkish army in northern Iraq ====
In 2003, although opposed to the Iraq War, Turkey took advantage of the weakening of the Iraqi government to conduct targeted interventions against the PKK in northern Iraq.

When the second Iraqi civil war broke out, the PKK played a decisive role in the fight against the Islamic State in northern Iraq, notably by coming to the aid of the Yazidis minorities, massacred and enslaved by the jihadists in the region of Sinjar. Having liberated the region from the jihadist presence, PKK fighters helped in the constitution of autonomous Yazidi militias, and remained in Sinjar notably on the Qandil Mountains.

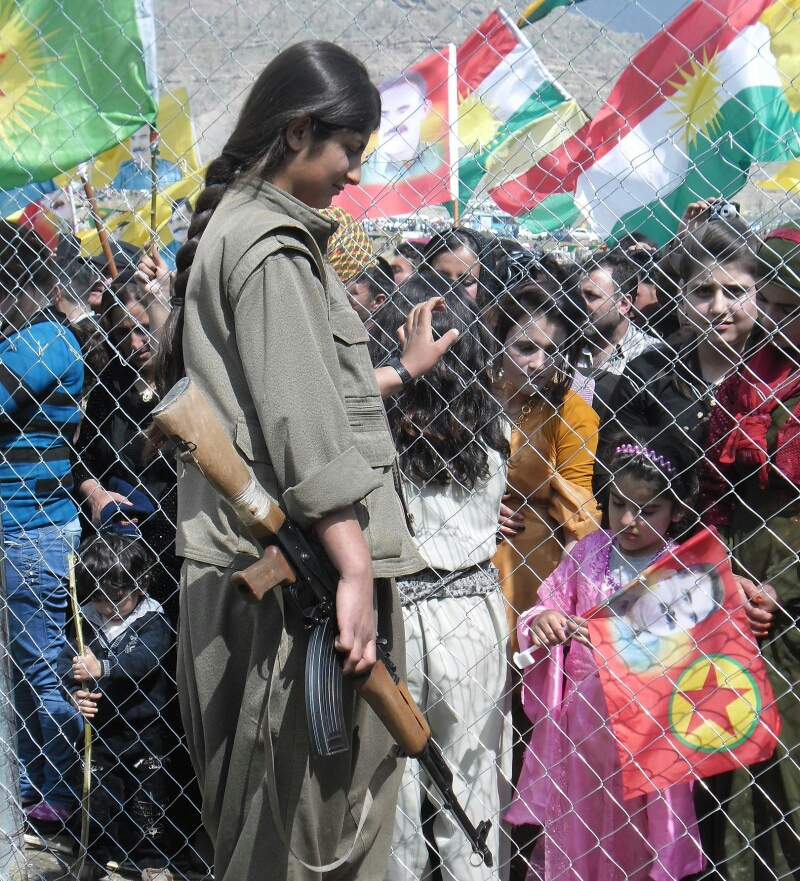
A fighter of the PKK in the Qandil mountains, in Iraq, 2014.

While Ankara's threats multiplied, the head of the Iraqi government Haider al-Abadi warned Turkey in November 2016 that it would be treated as an enemy if it provoked a confrontation in northern Iraq, after the deployment of Turkish tanks at the Turkish-Iraqi border. In January 2019, Iraqi protesters attacked a Turkish army base in Shiladze, in western Iraqi Kurdistan, which they accused of having killed four civilians in a bombing. A note of protest was handed to the Turkish ambassador denouncing repeated bombings in Iraq and a "violation of its sovereignty".

In August 2020 three Iraqi soldiers including two officers were killed by a Turkish drone in northern Iraq, prompting Baghdad to summon the Turkish ambassador for the third time in two months. Following this incident, Baghdad solicited the diplomatic support of the Arab League to obtain the withdrawal of Turkish troops from its territory, without success. For its part, the Iranian-backed Iraqi Shiite militia "Ashab Al-Kahf" demanded that Turkey cease its hostile acts and complete its withdrawal from Iraqi territory.

In January 2021, Turkish Defense Minister Hulusi Akar went to the two capitals, Baghdad and Erbil, to try to improve bilateral security cooperation. On 10 February 2021, the Turkish army launched a raid in northern Iraq to free PKK prisoners (military and members of the intelligence services), but this attempt turned into a fiasco and concluded with the death of the 13 prisoners. In April 2022 the Turkish army launched a new military operation in northern Iraq against the PKK, which in the meantime got closer to pro-Iranian militias rejecting the presence of Turkish forces in the north of the country in the name of Iraq's sovereignty. Several Turkish soldiers were killed during this operation. In November 2022, following a bomb attack in Istanbul attributed by the Turkish government to the PKK (which contested this accusation), Turkish aviation again bombed northern Iraq and Syria.

According to Iraqi sources, Turkey possessed in 2022 a hundred military support points in Kurdistan, with the presence of a permanent contingent of at least 4,000 soldiers. The Iraqi government and that of the autonomous region of Iraqi Kurdistan are regularly accused of ambivalence in tolerating Turkish military operations in order to preserve their close economic ties with Ankara. In March 2024, in the wake of a meeting between the Iraqi and Turkish foreign ministers, the Iraqi government officially banned the PKK.

In July, the Iraqi government denounced new incursions by the Turkish army in Iraqi Kurdistan after a resurgence of Ankara's military operations against the PKK. In August 2024, Turkey announced a military cooperation agreement with Iraq with the installation of joint command and training centers against PKK fighters.

=== Relations with Jordan ===
Iraq and Jordan are separated by a border of 181 kilometers, the two countries having previously been part of the Ottoman Empire until its dismantling after the First World War, before becoming British protectorates, the British Mandate for Mesopotamia and the Emirate of Transjordan, and finally gradually obtaining their independence (proclaimed in 1946 for Jordan). When the British received from the League of Nations a mandate to administer these two te ritories, two brothers of the Hashemite dynasty originating from Mecca, were placed to govern them: Abdullah I of Jordan, and his brother Faisal I of Iraq.

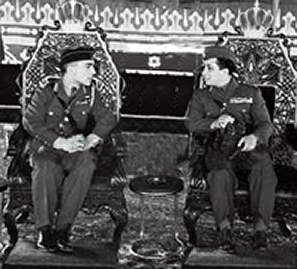
King Hussein of Jordan and his cousin King Faisal II in 1958.

The two states are members and co-founders of the Arab League and of the Organisation of Islamic Cooperation. In 1948 and 1967, they were with Egypt and Syria the main contributors to the Arab coalition formed against Israel during the 1948 Arab–Israeli War and during the Six-Day War (Jordan however refused, unlike Iraq, to participate in the Yom Kippur War in 1973).

On 14 February 1958, King Faisal II of Iraq and his cousin King Hussein of Jordan, decided to unite their two kingdoms into a single state, the Arab Federation of Iraq and Jordan, but it was dissolved five months later after the revolution which ended the Iraqi monarchy. It was following a request for military aid from King Hussein to his cousin Faisal II that the revolution took place, the Iraqi units en route to Jordan deciding to turn back on the night of 13 July 1958 to 14 July 1958 and overthrow the Iraqi monarch.

In 1968, the arrival in power of the Ba'ath party in Iraq was followed by a rapprochement between Iraq and Jordan, while the affinities between their populations remained strong. Under Saddam Hussein's regime, tens of thousands of Jordanian students obtained degrees in Iraqi universities thanks to scholarships offered by Iraq. In addition, Saddam Hussein's support for the Palestinian cause was favorably perceived by Jordan, which hosts a large number of Palestinian refugees.

Jordan did not get involved in any of the major armed conflicts affecting Iraq in 1980, 1990 and 2003, but opposed the two American interventions against Saddam Hussein, and hosted important waves of refugees.

In February 1990, Iraqi President Saddam Hussein went to Amman, where he was welcomed by the king. A few months later, at the beginning of the Gulf War, King Hussein declared in his address to the nation that the Western intervention was against "all Arabs and all Muslims" and evoked objectives aiming to "destroy Iraq and reorganize the area in a more dangerous way for our people than the Sykes-Picot agreements". His rhetoric was essentially populist addressed to his Jordanian population of Palestinian origin largely supportive of Saddam Hussein and economically interested due to Jordan's dependence on Iraqi oil. But on the substance, the invasion of Kuwait made King Hussein very angry, he never forgave Saddam Hussein and their degradation deteriorated.

In August 2003, in the midst of the Iraq War, while the new King Abdullah II of Jordan, in power since 1999, decided to support the American intervention of 2003 (unlike his father in 1990), the Jordanian embassy in Baghdad was targeted by a car bomb attack. As for the Jordanian population, the years following the fall and execution of Saddam Hussein, the former Iraqi dictator continued to arouse the admiration of many Jordanians, who saw in him a hero of the Arab and Palestinian causes. While his portraits and the symbols associated with his reign disappeared from public life in Iraq, his face remained omnipresent in Jordan, on stickers adorning car windows or phone cases in his likeness.

In 2008 King Abdullah II was the first Arab head of state to go to Baghdad since the establishment of the new authorities, dominated by Shiites. In 2014, Jordan joined the international coalition against the Islamic State by making military means available to Iraq, and conducting a series of airstrikes notably after the execution of one of its pilots by the jihadist group. In August 2017, Jordan and Iraq announced the reopening of their only border post closed since 2014, after securing the road linking their two capitals.

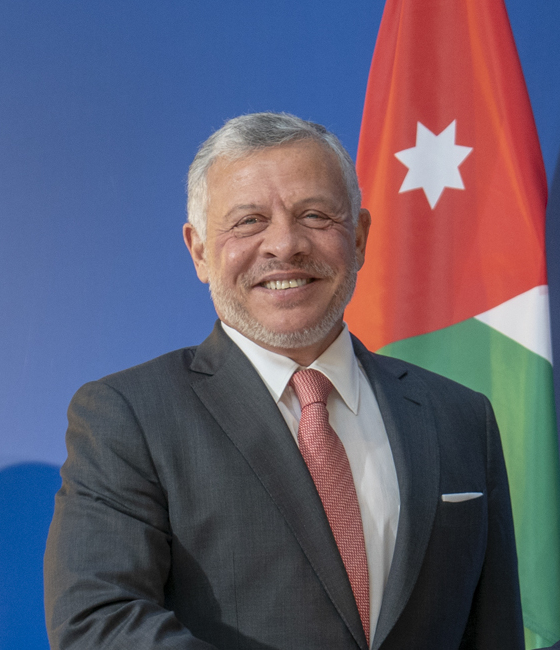
Abdullah II of Jordan, son of Hussein, King of Jordan since 1999

King Abdullah II went again to Baghdad in January 2019 to improve economic and energy cooperation between the two countries. This visit was encouraged by the United States, which sought to encourage the Iraqi authorities to reduce their economic and commercial dependence on Iran. It was crowned by the signing of agreements on trade, finance, agriculture, health, transport, the energy sector, with the extension of the Basra pipeline in Iraq to Aqaba in Jordan, and the creation of a common industrial zone of 24 square kilometers.

In April 2021, following an alleged plot against King Abdullah II, Iraqi Prime Minister Mustafa al-Kadhimi affirmed "standing alongside the Jordanian kingdom", whose sovereign he was to meet soon in Baghdad.

King Abdullah II went for the third time to Baghdad on 27 June 2021, in the framework of a tripartite summit between Iraq, Jordan, and Egypt, on political and economic cooperation, investments, and the fight against terrorism. An alliance between Egypt which has significant military capabilities, Iraq which has considerable oil resources and Jordan rich in its human capital is promising if these countries capitalize on their complementarity. Several cooperation agreements were thus signed in the sectors of energy, health and education, while Baghdad renewed its oil supply contract to Egypt of 12 million barrels in 2021, and plans to build an oil pipeline aiming to export 1 million barrels per day of crude from the Iraqi city of Basra to the Jordanian port of Aqaba.

Abdel Fattah el-Sisi, Mustafa al-Kadhimi and King Abdullah II met again in Baghdad in August 2021 during an expanded summit in the Middle East including France, focused on security and regional economic development.

In December 2022, Amman hosted the second international Baghdad conference aimed at supporting Iraq and promoting dialogue between countries in the region. King Abdullah II emphasized in a speech the "pivotal role of Iraq in maintaining regional stability".

=== Relations with Kuwait ===
Separated by a border of 240 kilometers, Kuwait and Iraq have undergone the same influences, having been successively under Ottoman domination (the "Basra Vilayet") and British, and could have formed a single country. Its route is defined by the Uqair agreements of 1922-1923.

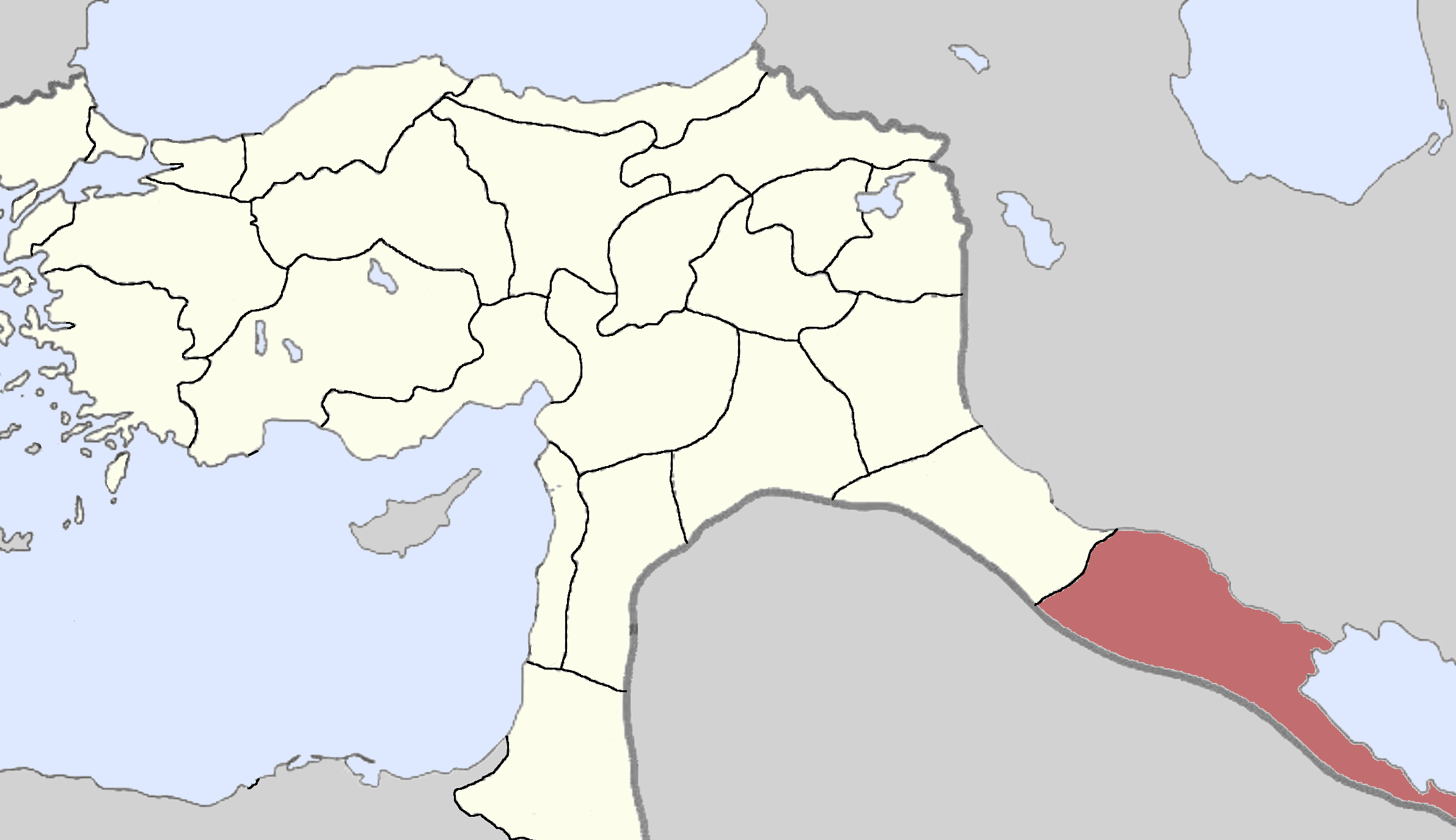
Basra Vilayet under the Ottoman Empire.

Relations between Iraq and Kuwait have always been more intense than with other Gulf countries, characterized by an alternation between tension and cooperation. Large Kuwaiti families were established in the Basra region where they owned important date plantations and the emirate depended closely on Iraq for its supplies of agricultural products and especially water from the Shatt Al-Arab. The first official claims of Iraq date back to 1937-1938, following the first oil discoveries in the Emirate. Since then, all Iraqi regimes of the 20th century claimed the latter. The death of King Ghazi in 1939 put an end to this first episode of tensions, but the delimitation of the border remained impossible due to Iraq's reluctance to recognize the legitimacy of a separate Kuwaiti entity.

In June 1961, following the British withdrawal formalizing Kuwait's independence, General Abd al-Karim Qasim, Iraqi Prime Minister since the 1958 revolution, claimed the territory of Kuwait as "an integral part of Iraq". To put pressure on the Emirate, he froze its funds placed in Iraqi banks, and blocked Kuwaiti ships stationed in Basra. In reaction, the Sheikh of Kuwait filed a complaint with the UN Security Council against this threat of annexation, submitted his candidacy to the Arab League and appealed for diplomatic and military aid from Great Britain. 5,000 British soldiers stationed in the Emirate, pushing Abd al-Karim Qasim to abandon his expansionist ambitions. At the initiative of Egyptian President Nasser these forces were replaced by a multinational Arab force, with the same objective of countering an Iraqi invasion.

The replacement in 1963 of Abd al-Karim Qasim by Abd al-Salam Arif opened the way to a normalization of relations: Iraq agreed to recognize Kuwait's sovereignty (on 4 October 1963) in exchange for the latter's renunciation of its defense treaty with Great Britain.

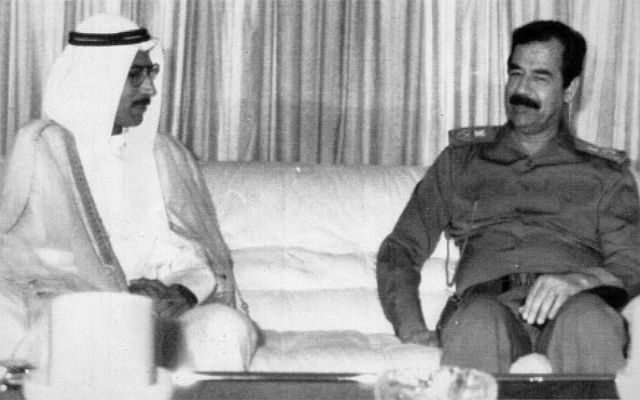
Alaa Hussein Ali with Saddam Hussein in 1990.

Between 1980 and 1988, Kuwait supported Iraq during the Iran–Iraq War. But two years later, ruined by its military expenditures and accusing Kuwait, one of its main creditors of having stolen oil from it by horizontal drilling, Saddam Hussein decided to invade the small Emirate. After a quick victory, he installed there a puppet government favorable to Iraq, led by the Kuwaiti officer Alaa Hussein Ali.

After a series of unsuccessful international negotiations, the United States declared war on Iraq in January 1991. The Gulf War grouping against Iraq a large international coalition lasted until the end of February 1991, date on which Kuwait was liberated. On 15 March 1991, the Emir of Kuwait, Jaber Al-Ahmad Al-Sabah, returned to the country after having spent more than 8 months in exile.

Early 1993, Saddam Hussein again led incursions into Kuwait and installed missiles in the no-fly zone, provoking the response of the United States (air raids in the south on 13 January 1993 and against Baghdad on 17 January 1993), before finally officially recognizing Kuwait in November 1994.

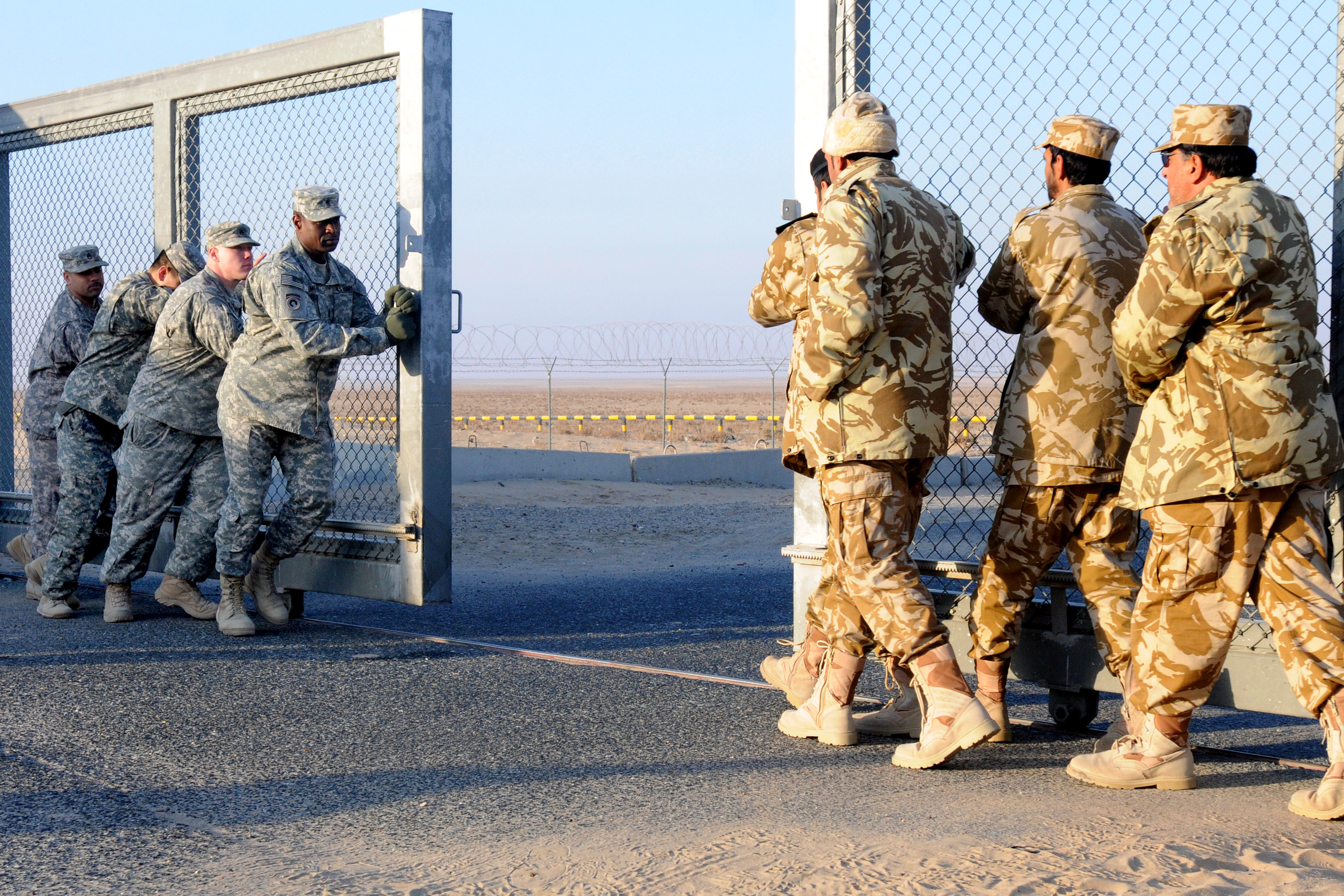
American and Kuwaiti soldiers close the gate at the border between Iraq and Kuwait marking the end of Operation New Dawn, 18 December 2011.

During the 2003 Iraq War, Kuwait joined the international coalition led by the United States and Great Britain, while a large part of the forces of this coalition stationed on the territory of the Emirate, from which they launched the invasion of Iraq on 20 March 2003.

In 2014, during the war against the Islamic State, Kuwait again made its territory available to the international coalition, this time in support of the Iraqi government. In retaliation, the jihadist group committed a bomb attack against a Shiite mosque in Kuwait in 2015. In 2018, after the end of the civil war, a strong sign of rapprochement between the two states, Kuwait was the host of an international conference on the reconstruction of Iraq. The following year, a project for electrical interconnection between Kuwait and Iraq was signed with the Gulf Cooperation Council, but this project struggled to materialize.

In 2021, thirty years after the Gulf War, Iraq paid more than 50 billion dollars in compensations to Kuwait, and returned several tons of archives looted by the Iraqi army during its seven months of occupation of this country. The Iraqi government officially declared having finished paying the indemnities due to Kuwait on 23 December 2021. The two countries have however still not delimited their maritime borders while the file of missing Kuwaitis remains open. Conflicts remain between the two states regarding the sharing of their oil resources and the competition between their port infrastructures. Kuwaiti coast guards regularly seize Iraqi fishing boats and arrest Iraqi fishermen for illegal entry into their territorial waters.

In July 2023, the head of Kuwaiti diplomacy Salem Al-Sabah went to Baghdad where he met his Iraqi counterpart Fuad Hussein, for a meeting focused on "the resolution of border issues". Baghdad announced for the following month a new meeting of a legal committee engaged on this file.

=== Relations with Syria ===
Iraq and Syria share a border of 600 kilometers, as well as strong historical and cultural ties. The two countries were part of the Ottoman Empire before its dismantling after World War I, and the border that separates them was drawn by the Sykes–Picot Agreement in 1916. Both are members and co-founders of the Arab League and of the Organisation of Islamic Cooperation, but Syria was suspended from these two organizations in 2011 and 2012 due to the repression of the regime which led to the Syrian civil war.

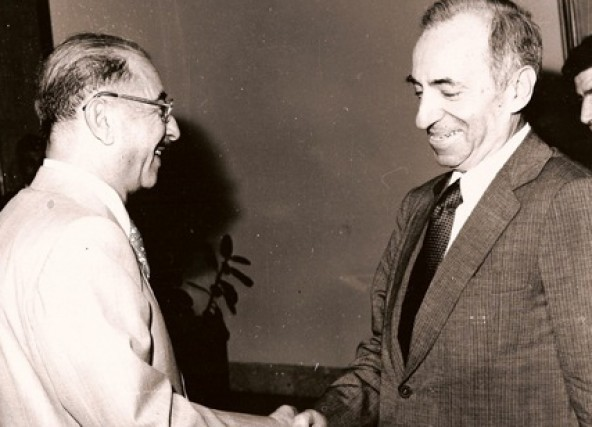
Iraqi President Ahmed Hassan al-Bakr and the Syrian founder of the Ba'ath Party Michel Aflaq, in 1968

The two states participated in the 1948 Arab–Israeli War, but their interests became divergent in the following years when Syria got closer to Nasser's Egypt, while Iraq was governed by a pro-British monarchy. In February 1958, Syria and Egypt merged into the United Arab Republic, following which Iraq and Jordan united in turn in the Arab Federation of Iraq and Jordan. But neither of these two federations lasted: Iraq seceded after a few months, while Syria left the United Arab Republic in September 1961.

In 1963, the "Arab Socialist Ba'ath Party" (called "Ba'ath Party"), pan-Arab and secular of Syrian origin (founded by the Syrian writer Michel Aflaq), came to power in Syria by a coup d'état, and led a similar attempt in Iraq, but only truly succeeded there in 1968. Paradoxically, this takeover by the same party in two neighboring countries contributed to strongly deteriorating their relations, each being governed by two rival branches of the party, to which was added a religious rivalry between the Sunni regime of Baghdad and the Alawite regime of Damascus.

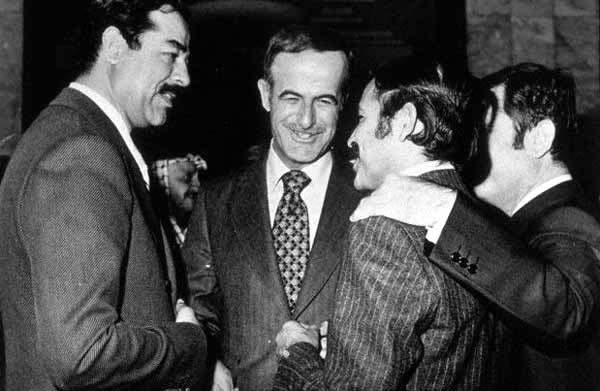
The heads of state of Iraq, Syria, and Algeria at the Arab League summit in Baghdad (1978): Saddam Hussein, Hafez al-Assad, and Abdelaziz Bouteflika.

This did not prevent them from remaining objective allies against Israel against whom both fought during the Yom Kippur War in 1973. But in 1979, Saddam Hussein broke diplomatic relations with Damascus due to Syrian support for Iran, with which he was at war. Indeed, during the Iran-Iraq War, the Syrian government delivered weapons to Tehran, and closed the pipeline connecting Kirkuk to the Syrian port of Baniyas, with limited consequences for Iraq thanks to the commissioning of the Kirkuk-Ceyhan pipeline in 1977.

In 1990, Syria joined the international coalition against Iraq during the Gulf War, Hafez al-Assad seeking to tighten ties with Washington, after the collapse of the USSR. He welcomed US President Bill Clinton in Damascus in 1994, while at the same time, Iraq was under embargo imposed by the United States. However, ten years later, the overthrow of Saddam Hussein following the Iraq War and his replacement by a Shiite government (of which Alawism is a branch) allowed a Syrian-Iraqi rapprochement, like the relations between Iraq and Iran, ally of Damascus. In the meantime, upon his arrival in power in 2000, Bashar al-Assad had engaged a diplomatic warming between Baghdad and Damascus, but their relations were only normalized in 2006.

In 2011, Baghdad abstained during the vote that led to the suspension of Damascus from the Arab League, due to the repression of the regime of the Syrian revolution. Baghdad was also one of the few Arab capitals to keep its embassy in Damascus.

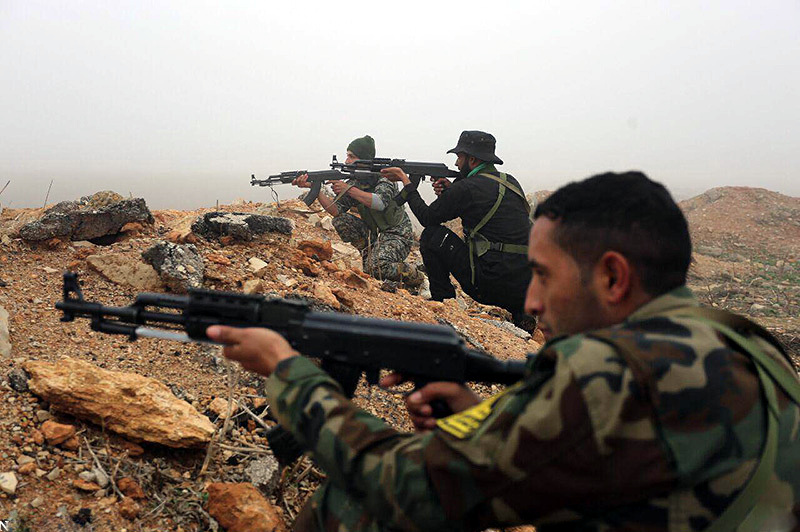
Shiite Iraqi militiamen from Saraya al-Khorasani in the region of Aleppo, in January 2016.

From 2013, Iraq and Syria were simultaneously in civil war, and fought the same Sunni extremist group, the Islamic State, which established a "caliphate" covering a significant area of these two countries. The two Shiite governments collaborated on several fronts against this common enemy. The Iraqi air force carried out several strikes in eastern Syria with the approval of the Syrian government, while like the Lebanese Hezbollah, Iraqi Shiite militias fought alongside the Syrian army. But Iraqi involvement in the Syrian civil war was not limited to the war against the Islamic State, Iraqi Shiite militias also actively participating in the regime's repression against the rebels, notably during the Battle of Aleppo. In parallel, Iraq hosted between 2011 and 2021 approximately 250,000 Syrian refugees who fled the civil war, mainly in refugee camps located in Iraqi Kurdistan.

In October 2018, the border post located between the cities of Iraq and Syria Bukamal, and Al-Qa'im was reopened following the recapture of these two cities from the Islamic State by the Iraqi and Syrian armies. This post constituted before the outbreak of the war in Syria in 2011 one of the strategic arteries for the passage of goods, tourists and labor.

The following years, Baghdad actively campaigned for the reintegration of Syria into the Arab League, which was officially reintegrated on 7 May 2023, and participated in the league summit in Jeddah on 19 May. The following month, Syrian Foreign Minister Faisal Mekdad went to Baghdad and met his Iraqi counterpart Fuad Hussein to discuss strengthening Syrian-Iraqi cooperation in humanitarian aid and the fight against drug trafficking. Faisal Mekdad also met with Prime Minister Mohammed Shia' Al Sudani and President Abdul Latif Rashid, whom he thanked for their help after the 2023 earthquake in Turkey and Syria. Two months later, Iraqi Prime Minister Mohammed Shia' Al Sudani went to Damascus where he was received by Syrian President Bashar al-Assad, a meeting focused on strengthening Syrian-Iraqi bilateral relations, notably security.

In December 2024, on the eve of the offensive launched in northwestern Syria by the Syrian rebel Islamist group Hay'at Tahrir al-Sham, Iraqi factions were still present on Syrian territory, particularly in the Deir ez-Zor Governorate When this offensive was launched, Mohammed Shia' Al Sudani declared that "the security and stability of Syria are directly linked to Iraq's national security", and called his Turkish counterpart Recep Tayyip Erdogan, supporter of HTS, to affirm to him that "Iraq will not be a mere spectator of the serious repercussions of the events taking place in Syria". A massive Iraqi intervention then appeared probable if the Syrian regime was threatened, but this could exacerbate the already tense tensions between Baghdad and Ankara. Thus, Iraqi support for the Assad regime was minimal, limited to about 300 Iraqi fighters sent as reinforcements to protect the Shiite shrine of Sayyidah Zaynab, near Damascus, and to a strengthening of security along the Syrian-Iraqi border. Most of the pro-Iran Iraqi militias also showed reluctance to intervene, for fear that Israeli aviation would take advantage to bomb them. On 8 December, the fall of the Syrian regime caused the flight of several thousand pro-regime Syrian soldiers to Iraq, and put the Iraqi government in an awkward position. This end of the Assad reign in Syria reshuffles the regional cards (notably cutting the Shiite corridor Tehran-Baghdad-Damascus-Beirut), and forces the Iraqi government to position itself towards its new neighboring interlocutors. The head of the HTS group Ahmed al-Sharaa, imprisoned for several years in Iraq for his membership in Al-Qaeda, became Syrian head of state after his victory in the Syrian civil war. Following his arrival in power, he addressed in a video the Iraqi Prime Minister and assured him of his desire to establish renewed political and economic relations with Iraq. In April 2025, the two heads of state met for the first time in Qatar, each being there on a visit at the invitation of the emir Tamim bin Hamad Al Thani.

=== Relations with Lebanon ===
Iraq and Lebanon are both members and founders of the Arab League, and members of the Organisation of Islamic Cooperation. Iraq and Lebanon are culturally close and share the same language, despite some dialectal differences.

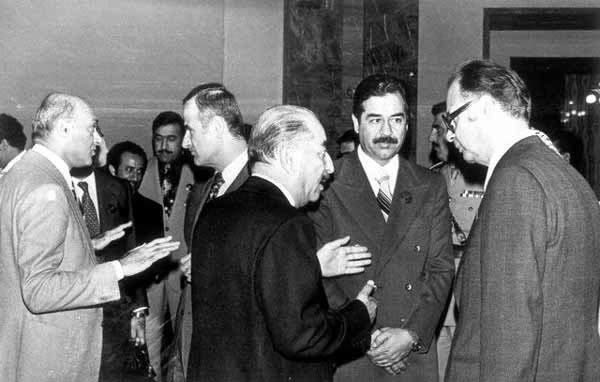
Conversation between Iraqi President Ahmed Hassan al-Bakr (left), his vice-president Saddam Hussein (center), and Lebanese Prime Minister Selim Hoss (right) during the Arab League summit in Baghdad in 1978.

During the Arab-Israeli wars of 1948 and 1967, Iraq and Lebanon both participated in the Arab coalitions formed against Israel although Lebanese participation was much lower than that of the other Arab armies. Lebanon did not take sides during the major armed conflicts affecting Iraq in 1980 and 1990, being itself confronted with a civil war between 1975 and 1990, during which General Michel Aoun received weapons from Saddam Hussein to fight against the intervention of the Syrian army on its soil.

In 1990, Syrian President Hafez al-Assad sided with Washington in the Gulf War, and received in return the American green light to take control of Lebanon. In 2003, former Lebanese President Amine Gemayel (1982-1988) went to Baghdad for mediation in an attempt, unsuccessfully, to prevent the invasion of Iraq by the United States.

During the second Iraqi civil war (2013-2017), the Lebanese Hezbollah participated in the conflict in the camp loyal to the Iraqi government, alongside the other Shiite militias supported by Iran. In February 2018, Michel Aoun went to Baghdad as President of the Lebanese Republic (a year after his election in October 2016) marking the first visit to Iraq by a Lebanese head of state in office for decades. He met there his counterpart Fuad Masum and Iraqi Prime Minister Haider al-Abadi. The main subject of their exchanges concerned Lebanese participation in the reconstruction of Iraq after the end of the second civil war, to which were added subjects of security cooperation against Islamist terrorism, but also against Israel against which the two states are still enemies.

In April 2021, Lebanese Health Minister Hamad Hassan and his Iraqi counterpart Hassan al-Tamimi met in Beirut and signed a framework agreement between the two countries including the supply by Iraq of 3.5 million barrels of oil per year to Lebanon, in exchange for medical and hospital services. Lebanon attracts significant medical tourism, each year, thousands of Iraqi patients who come there seeking care now non-existent in their country.

More than 15,000 Lebanese live in Iraq, including about 5,000 in Iraqi Kurdistan, while many Shiite Lebanese go each year to Iraq, to the holy places of Najaf and the city of Karbala. Since the end of the second Iraqi civil war, Iraq has become an attractive destination for qualified Lebanese lacking opportunity in their country in crisis. In 2021, about 900 Lebanese companies are established in Iraq, mainly in the fields of tourism, catering or health. According to Iraqi authorities, more than 20,000 Lebanese went to Iraq between June 2021 and February 2022, not counting pilgrims visiting the cities of Najaf and Karbala.

The total volume of Lebanese exports to Iraq is however quite limited, rarely crossing the threshold of 150 million dollars per year, due to competition from Iran and Turkey and logistical costs that the two poor countries struggle to bear.

=== Relations with Saudi Arabia ===
Iraq and Saudi Arabia are separated by a border of 814 kilometers, the two countries having previously been part of the Ottoman Empire until its dismantling after World War I. Both members and co-founders of the Arab League, of the Organization of the Petroleum Exporting Countries, and of the Organisation of Islamic Cooperation. After the 1958 Iraqi revolution, although having little affinity with the pro-Western monarchy of Saudi Arabia, the Iraqi government sought to find with it a regional modus vivendi and to reassure it that it had no intention of interfering in its affairs, nor of exporting its revolution there. In 1961 however, Saudi Arabia, in solidarity with Kuwait the other pro-Western monarchy in the region, was one of the main contributors to the multinational Arab force deployed in this country to prevent Iraq from annexing it.

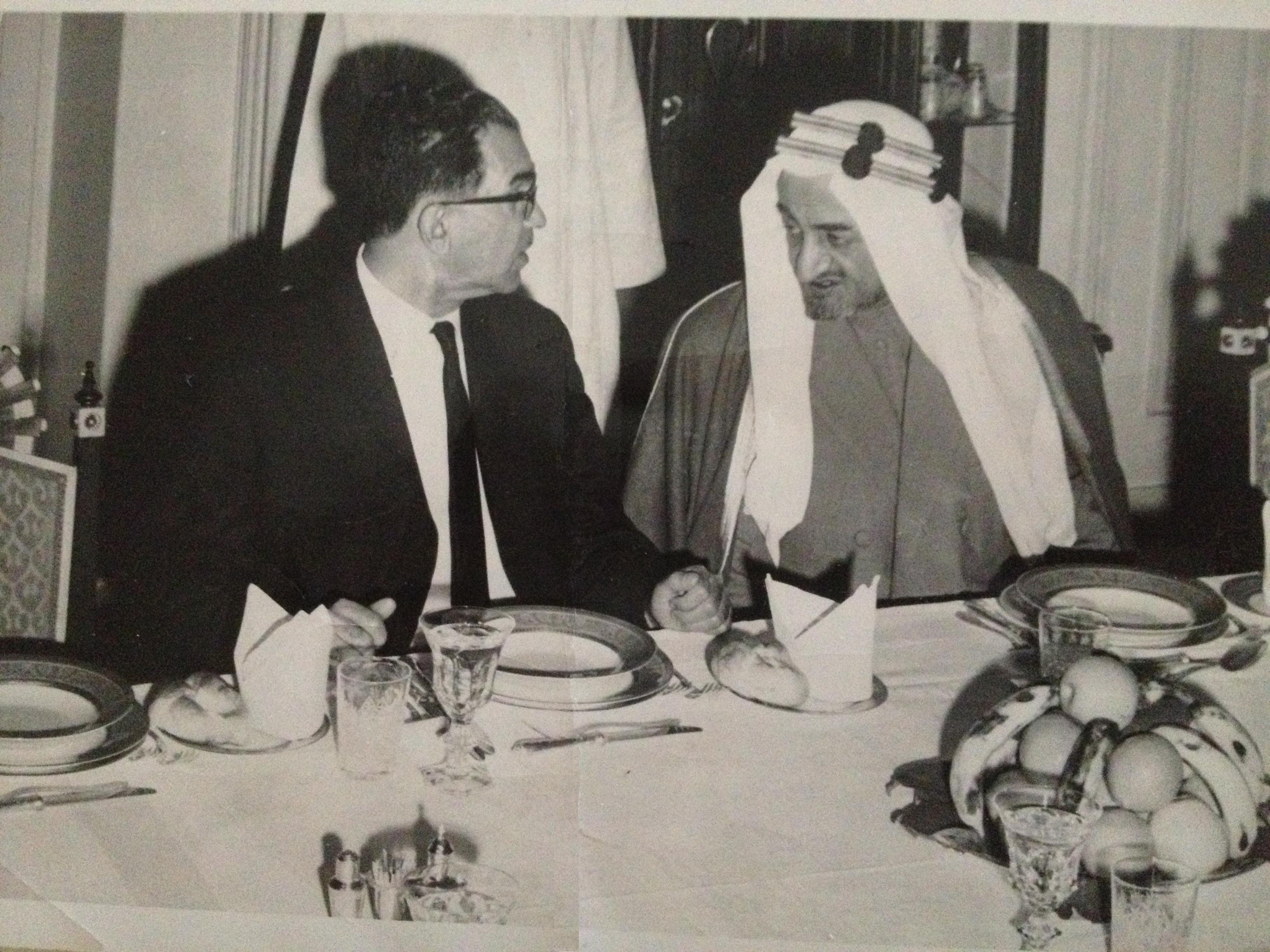
Meeting between Saudi King Faisal of Saudi Arabia and Iraqi Prime Minister Abd al-Rahman al-Bazzaz in 1966.

A real détente between Iraq and Saudi Arabia was established in 1975 after the signing of an agreement on border delimitation, which also allowed a détente in relations between Iraq and Iran, another pillar of American strategy in the Gulf. The two countries got closer following the 1979 Iranian revolution which triggered strong concern in Saudi Arabia which saw the emergence of a Shiite theocracy in a neighboring country. The Saudi royal family, wishing to forge an alliance with Iraq against Iran, then the main military power in the Middle East, decided to receive Saddam Hussein on an official visit during the summer of 1980, marking the first visit of an Iraqi president to the kingdom. The two countries agreed that it was in their common interest for Iraq to attack Iran: this would satisfy Saddam Hussein's expansionist ambitions by widening his access to the sea and giving him control of oil regions, and it would neutralize a significant threat to Saudi Arabia.

Thus, when the Iran-Iraq War began in September 1980, Saudi Arabia was one of Iraq's main foreign supporters. In 1981, following the destruction by the Israeli Air Force of the Osirak nuclear reactor, King Khalid of Saudi Arabia declared that Riyadh would finance the reconstruction of the plant. Iraq, for its part, embarked on the construction of two major pipelines to transport 2 million barrels of oil per day to Saudi ports on the Red Sea, thus accepting to link its most vital interests to its cooperation with the kingdom. In the spring of 1990, a non-aggression pact was concluded between Riyadh and Baghdad, while Saudi Arabia agreed to cancel Iraq's debt that it had accumulated during its war against Iran.

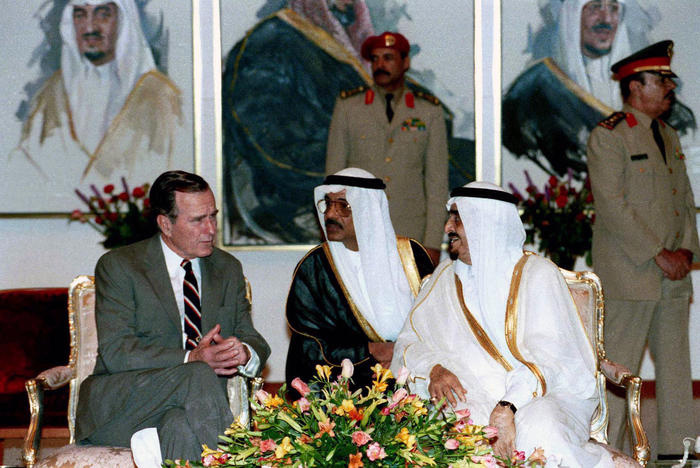
Saudi King Fahd of Saudi Arabia (in the foreground) in power from 1982 to 2005, received in 1990 by US President George H. W. Bush to discuss the situation in Iraq. Aligned with US foreign policy, King Fahd supported Saddam Hussein during the Iran–Iraq War, then participated in the international coalition against Iraq during the Gulf War.

These relations deteriorated following the invasion of Kuwait by Iraq in 1990, following which Riyadh broke its relations with Baghdad, closed its land border with Iraq and participated in the Gulf War within the international coalition. A large part of the coalition forces stationed in Saudi Arabia, and their positions were bombed several times by the Iraqi army. Iraqi-Saudi tensions intensified after the 2003 Iraq War which changed the Iraqi political system; Riyadh was accused by the now Shiite Iraqi government of supporting Sunni political opposition movements. Iran, for its part consolidated its political influence and placed Shiite militias affiliated with it in Iraq, further distancing the country from its other Saudi neighbor.

It was not until 2015 that the two states reestablished their diplomatic relations, under the influence of the United States which sought Arab unity in the framework of the fight against the Islamic State. After having been absent from the country after the fall of Saddam Hussein, which created a void filled by Iran, Saudi Arabia turned again towards Baghdad, and appointed its first ambassador there in January 2016. But he was recalled a few months later for controversial remarks on the action of Shiite militias Hashd al-Shaabi in the fighting against the jihadists of the Islamic State in Sunni areas. In August 2017, Saudi Arabia and Iraq announced their decision to reopen the Arar border crossing, in northern Saudi Arabia, closed since the Gulf War, to facilitate trade. In April 2018, Saudi Arabia announced its intention to offer a football stadium to Iraq, built in Baghdad, with a capacity of 100,000 spectators.

In April 2019, diplomatic relations officially resumed between the two countries with the inauguration of two Saudi consulates in Baghdad and in Najaf, an important place of pilgrimage for the Shiite community. The same year, the Iraqi Prime Minister, Adil Abdul-Mahdi went to Saudi Arabia and concluded thirteen political and economic agreements. Iraq notably signed with the Gulf Cooperation Council an agreement to import electricity, in order to alleviate a shortage that deprives Iraqis of electricity sometimes up to 20 hours a day.

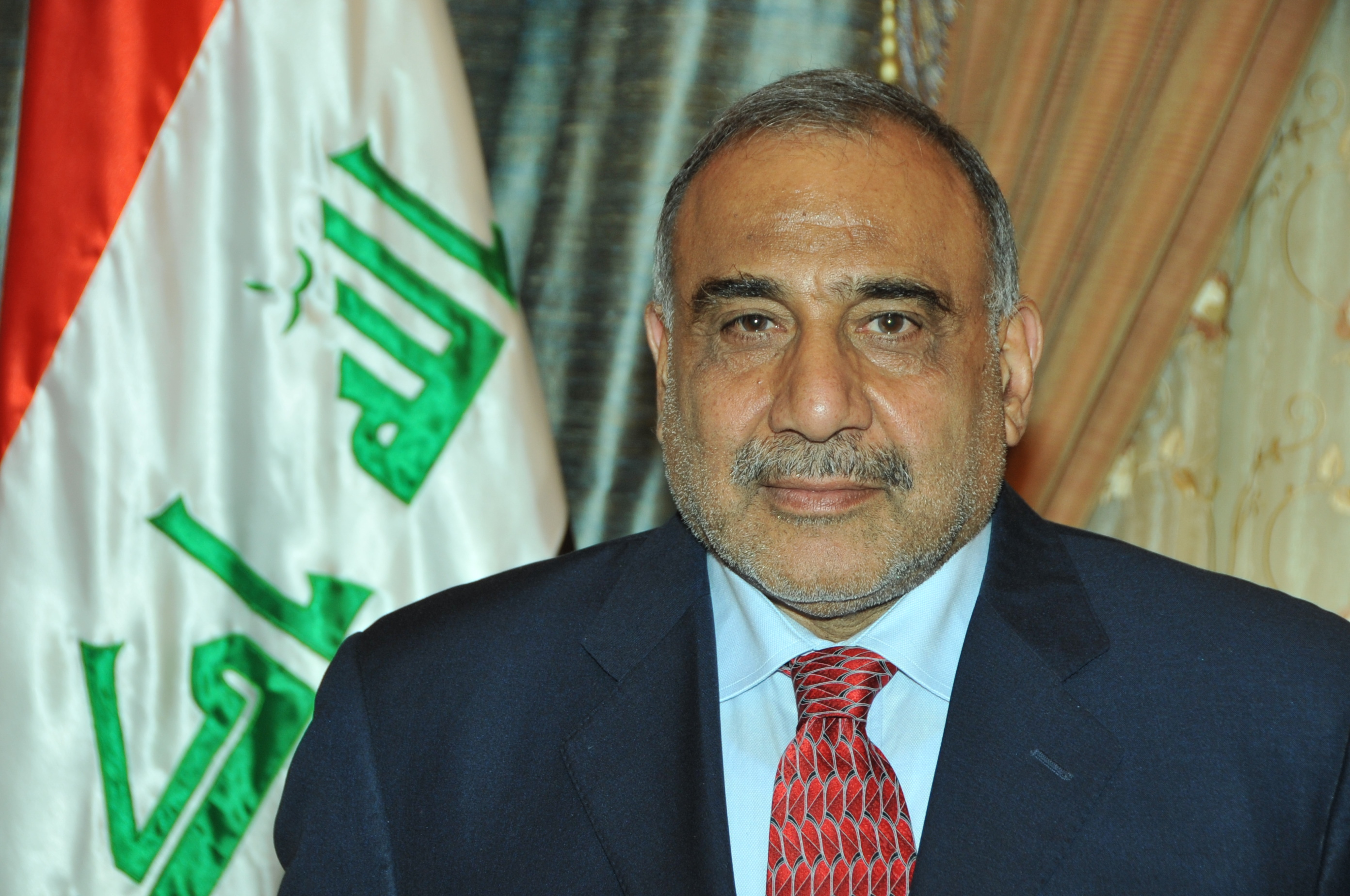
Adil Abdul-Mahdi, Iraqi Prime Minister from 2018 to 2020

On 7 May 2020, the arrival at the post of Prime Minister of Mustafa Al-Kadhimi, pro-American, was however favorably perceived by the Saudi monarchy, itself maintaining very strong bilateral relations with Washington. The new Iraqi government affirmed, in a nationalist speech, wanting to replace Iraq in its Arab environment in coherence with its majority population. Two weeks later, the Iraqi Minister of Finance and Oil, Ali Allawi went to Saudi Arabia. An agreement was concluded with Saudi companies to invest in the Akkas gas fields, in the Iraqi province of al-Anbar, while Riyadh announced the return to Baghdad of a new Saudi ambassador. Saudi Deputy Defense Minister, Prince Khalid bin Salman declared on Twitter:

We look forward to Iraq rising from its ashes to regain its status as one of the strong and resilient pillars of the Arab world.

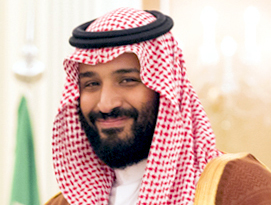
Saudi Prince Mohammed bin Salman

A meeting between Mustafa al-Kadhimi and Prince Mohammed bin Salman in Saudi Arabia was however canceled the following month, due to health problems of the latter. In November 2020, Iraq and Saudi Arabia announced the official reopening of the Arar border post, closed since 1990. Mustafa al-Kadhimi and Mohammed bin Salman finally met in Riyadh in March 2021, during a visit intended to strengthen trade ties between the two states, as well as economic cooperation and investments in energy and transport. The delegations signed five agreements in the financial, commercial, economic, cultural and media fields and agreed to establish a common fund with an estimated capital of three billion dollars. They also planned to complete an electrical interconnection project, and to maintain their cooperation to maintain stability on the world oil market, while Iraq and Saudi Arabia are the two main producers of black gold within OPEC.

In December 2022, on the occasion of the visit to Saudi Arabia of Chinese President Xi Jinping, the new Iraqi Prime Minister Mohammed Shia' Al Sudani represented his country at the Sino-Arab summit organized by Mohammed bin Salman. He declared there his intention to"strengthen its ties with Arab countries", while "balancing its relations with its other neighbors". Ten days later, Saudi Foreign Minister Faisal bin Farhan went to Jordan which organized the second "Baghdad Conference", and assured that his country stood "alongside Iraq to preserve its stability and sovereignty".

In May 2023, the kingdom's sovereign wealth fund (PIF) created a unit endowed with 3 billion dollars to invest in several Iraqi sectors – mines, infrastructure, finance, real estate and agriculture – as part of a 24 billion dollar plan intended for six countries in the region. In the wake, the oil company Saudi Aramco began talks with the Iraqi government to invest massively in the Akkas gas field in the Iraqi province of Al-Anbar. In April 2024, Saudi Arabia and Iraq announced the opening of a direct airline between the cities of Dammam, in the east of the Saudi kingdom where its minority Shiite community is concentrated, and Najaf, Shiite holy city south of Baghdad. The following month, the Saudi ambassador to Iraq, Abdulaziz al-Shammari, met the governor of Karbala province Nassif al-Khattabi in the city of Karbala, also a Shiite holy city. These events have strong symbolic value, while the Shiites, majority in the Iraqi population, have long been oppressed, even persecuted, in Saudi Arabia.

=== Relations with the United Arab Emirates ===
Iraq and the United Arab Emirates are both members of the Arab League, and of the Organisation of Islamic Cooperation. Only the emirate of Abu Dhabi is a member of the Organization of the Petroleum Exporting Countries, the other emirates of this federation having much lower and declining production. During the Gulf War, the United Arab Emirates integrated and actively participated in the intervention of the international coalition against the Iraqi army, but not during the 2003 Iraq War. In 2008, a few years after the fall of Saddam Hussein, the United Arab Emirates decided to cancel the Iraqi debt they held, amounting to a little less than 7 billion dollars, in order to help the Iraqi government engage in the reconstruction of its country at war. The same year, the United Arab Emirates appointed an ambassador to Baghdad, Abdullah Ibrahim al-Shehi, while most Arab countries had withdrawn their diplomatic staff from the Iraqi capital due to insecurity. The UAE ambassador to Baghdad was briefly recalled in early 2014 to protest against the sectarian policy of Iraqi Prime Minister Nouri al-Maliki, which they judged responsible for the civil war in Iraq.

In 2014, the United Arab Emirates also integrated the international coalition formed against the Islamic State by carrying out airstrikes and hosting French planes on their soil. The Emirates nevertheless decided to suspend their participation in airstrikes following the execution of a Jordanian pilot by the Islamic State. In September 2018, UNESCO launched an initiative aimed at gathering funds to rebuild the Iraqi city of Mosul, largely destroyed during its liberation by the Iraqi army in 2016-2017. Four months later, out of the 100 million dollars raised for this initiative, more than half came from a donation of 50.4 million dollars from the United Arab Emirates. In 2023, Abu Dhabi committed to investing 500 million dollars in a hydraulic project in Sinjar.

=== Relations with Qatar ===
Iraq shares with Qatar affinities with Iran, rare for countries whose populations are majority Arab. Like for Iraq, the geographical position of Qatar explains this diplomatic proximity with Tehran: the small emirate has a maritime border with Iran where the North Dome offshore field is located, jointly exploited by the two countries. Thus, their simultaneous proximity with Iran, the Arab Gulf countries, and Western countries (since the overthrow of Saddam Hussein) creates natural affinities between Baghdad and Doha. Before the fall of Saddam Hussein, Qatar participated in the coalition formed against Iraq during the Gulf War; but did not take sides in the Iran-Iraq Wars, nor in the 2003 Iraq War.

In June 2023, Qatar unveiled an investment plan of 5 billion dollars, in addition to the 9.5 billion dollars of agreements that private Qatari companies signed in the construction of two power plants in the country. QatarEnergy is a major investor and operator of hydrocarbon fields in Iraq. At the end of August, Mohammed Shia' Al Sudani attended the groundbreaking of the luxurious hotel and residential complex Rixos, first Qatari investment in Baghdad.

=== Relations with Oman ===
Oman's diplomatic opening at the beginning of the 1970s was coldly received by Iraq, which reproached the sultanate for its proximity to Great Britain, former colonial power from which Iraq freed itself like Egypt in the late 1950s. The Ba'athist Iraqi regime voted against the sultanate's admission to the Arab League in 1971 The Sultanate nevertheless integrated the organization that year, as well as the Organisation of Islamic Cooperation in 1970. Between 1964 and 1976, Iraq supported the Marxist rebellion against the pro-British Omani ruling family during the Dhofar War. In June 1980 a military agreement signed between Oman and the United States accentuated the animosity of the Ba'athist Iraqi regime, but Sultan Qaboos played appeasement, favoring stability and security in the Gulf. Oman distinguished itself from its neighbors by its neutrality during the Iran–Iraq War due to its good relations with Iran, while not being able to go against the Gulf Cooperation Council whose majority of member states were favorable to Iraq.

During the invasion of Kuwait by Saddam Hussein in 1990, Oman distinguished itself again by keeping diplomatic relations with Iraq, even though, paradoxically, the sultanate supported the coalition led by the United States against the Iraqi army during the Gulf War. In 2003, part of Oman's air bases was also used by the British army during the Iraq War which caused the overthrow and execution of Saddam Hussein. On 12 May 2019, Oman announced the reopening of its embassy in Baghdad, closed since 1990.

=== Relations with Yemen ===
Iraq and Yemen are both members of the Arab League, and of the Organisation of Islamic Cooperation. In 1990, the year of its unification into a single country, Yemen was, with Jordan, the only country in the Middle East to oppose the outbreak of the Gulf War. Its president Ali Abdullah Saleh provided diplomatic and military support to Saddam Hussein, but nevertheless attempted, unsuccessfully to convince him to evacuate Kuwait in order to avoid war. The following years, Yemen was torn by a series of civil wars in 1994 then in the 2010s, during which, like Iraq, Sunni extremist groups like Al-Qaeda and the Islamic State attempted to establish themselves and committed numerous attacks.

In July 2023, Iraqi Foreign Minister Fuad Hussein received his Yemeni counterpart Ahmed Awad Bin Mubarak, to whom he proposed his help, as mediator, to end the Yemeni civil war ongoing since 2015. In April 2025, the Iraqi government committed to preventing any non-civilian activity of the Houthis in power in Yemen on its territory, after having welcomed the latter in the framework of the "Axis of Resistance" led by Iran. This decision was taken under the influence of Washington which feared that the Houthis would launch attacks against its bases in Iraq in retaliation for the American strikes targeting their forces in Yemen.

=== Relations with Turkmenistan ===
In October 2023, Iraq signed with Turkmenistan a memorandum of understanding to import natural gas from this Central Asian country, via Iranian pipelines. This agreement aims to secure imports of this hydrocarbon crucial for Iraqi power plants.

=== Relations with Armenia ===
The populations of Armenia and Iraq have very ancient relations dating back to the ancient era of Mesopotamia, then both having been part of the Ottoman Empire between the 15th and 20th centuries. After the conquest of Armenia by the Soviet Union, Armenia's foreign policy was integrated into that of the Soviet Union, to which Iraq got closer after the 1958 revolution which overthrew the pro-Western monarchy.

Armenia and Iraq established relations when Armenia declared its independence from the Soviet Union in 1992. Armenia opened an embassy in Baghdad in 2000 and Iraq opened its in Yerevan a year later. In 2003, Armenia opposed the American invasion of Iraq, but sent troops to help the American mission in the country.

In the 2010s, Iraq was one of Armenia's most important trading partners. In 2016, trade between these two countries amounted to more than 140 million dollars, while trade between these two countries increased by 30%.

In February 2021, Armenian Deputy Foreign Minister Artak Apitonian and his Iraqi counterpart Nizar Khairallah met in Baghdad, and signed an agreement allowing visa-free entry for diplomatic personnel, as well as a memorandum of understanding on political consultations between the two countries During his visit to Iraq, Artak Apitonyan also met Iraqi Minister of Agriculture Mohammed al-Khafaji, the president of the Armenian-Iraqi Intergovernmental Commission Rehan Hanna Ayoubi, and the primate of the Armenian Apostolic Diocese in Iraq, Archbishop Avak Assadourian.

=== Relations with Israel ===
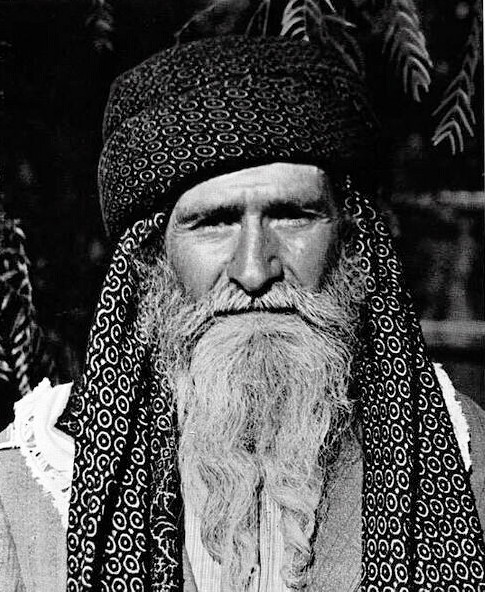
Iraqi Jew in the 1930s.

Before the founding of the State of Israel in May 1948, the Jewish community of Iraq numbered about 120,000 people, the majority being concentrated in Iraqi Kurdistan and Baghdad where they represented a third of the population. Their presence dates back to the 6th century BC, when the prophet of Judaism Ezekiel followed his people into exile in Babylon after the conquest of the Kingdom of Judah (which corresponds to the current territory of Israel) by Nebuchadnezzar II in 597 BC.

The beginning of the 20th century simultaneously saw the formation in the Middle East of an Arab nationalism against the Ottoman Empire, and Zionism carried by Jews wishing to establish an independent Hebrew state in Palestine. In January 1919, in the wake of the defeat of the Central Powers in the First World War, Emir Faisal ibn Hussein, future king of Iraq, met in London Chaim Weizmann, president of the World Zionist Organization, with whom he signed an agreement governing relations between Jews and Arabs in the Near and Middle East. This agreement was to initiate Judeo-Arab cooperation for the development of a Jewish national home in the State of Palestine (passed under the control of the United Kingdom) and of an Arab nation over most of the Middle East. But this Arab nation never saw the light of day, the territories taken by the allies from the Ottoman Empire being divided into zones under the control of the French and British (who placed Faisal I at the head of their protectorate over Iraq); the 1919 Faisal-Weizmann agreement thus remained a dead letter.

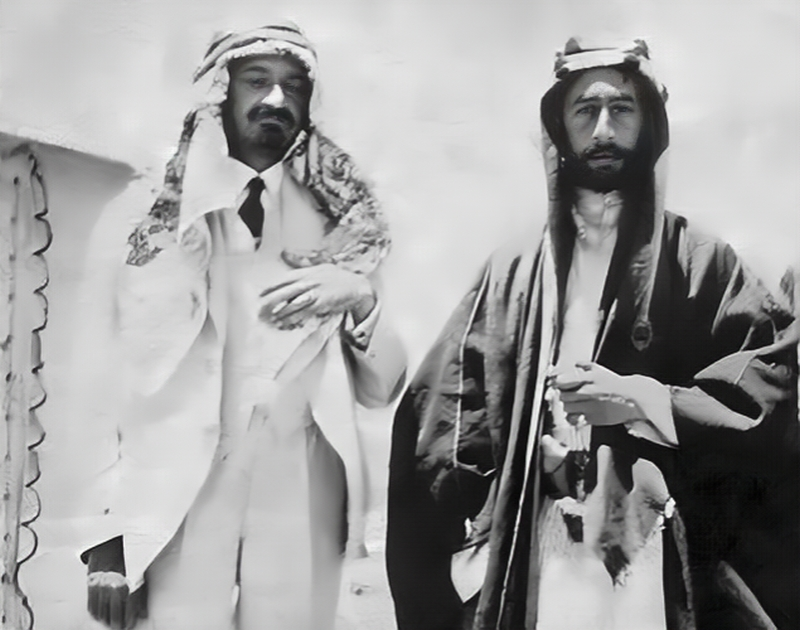
Emir Faisal I and Chaim Weizmann (left).

During World War II, following the overthrow by British troops of the Prime Minister Rashid Ali al-Gaylani, pogroms took place against Jews in Baghdad and caused hundreds of victims.

In October 1947, it was therefore against the will of the Arab populations and neighboring countries that the UN voted the partition plan for Palestine, providing for the creation of the state of Israel, officially founded in May 1948. Transjordan attacked the state, with the support of Iraq. In 1951, two years after the defeat of the Arab coalition during the 1948-1949 war, Iraq expelled Israel dwellers from the territory; almost all were evacuated to Israel during Operation Ezra and Nehemiah.

In parallel, Israeli Prime Minister David Ben-Gurion, in search of non-Arab "peripheral allies" in the Middle East (for which he got closer to Iran and Turkey), took interest in the Kurds of Iraq, opposed to the central government. Mullah Mustafa Barzani, founder of the Kurdistan Democratic Party, led in the 1960s and 1970s a series of guerrillas against the Baghdad government, and went several times to Israel to obtain military support.

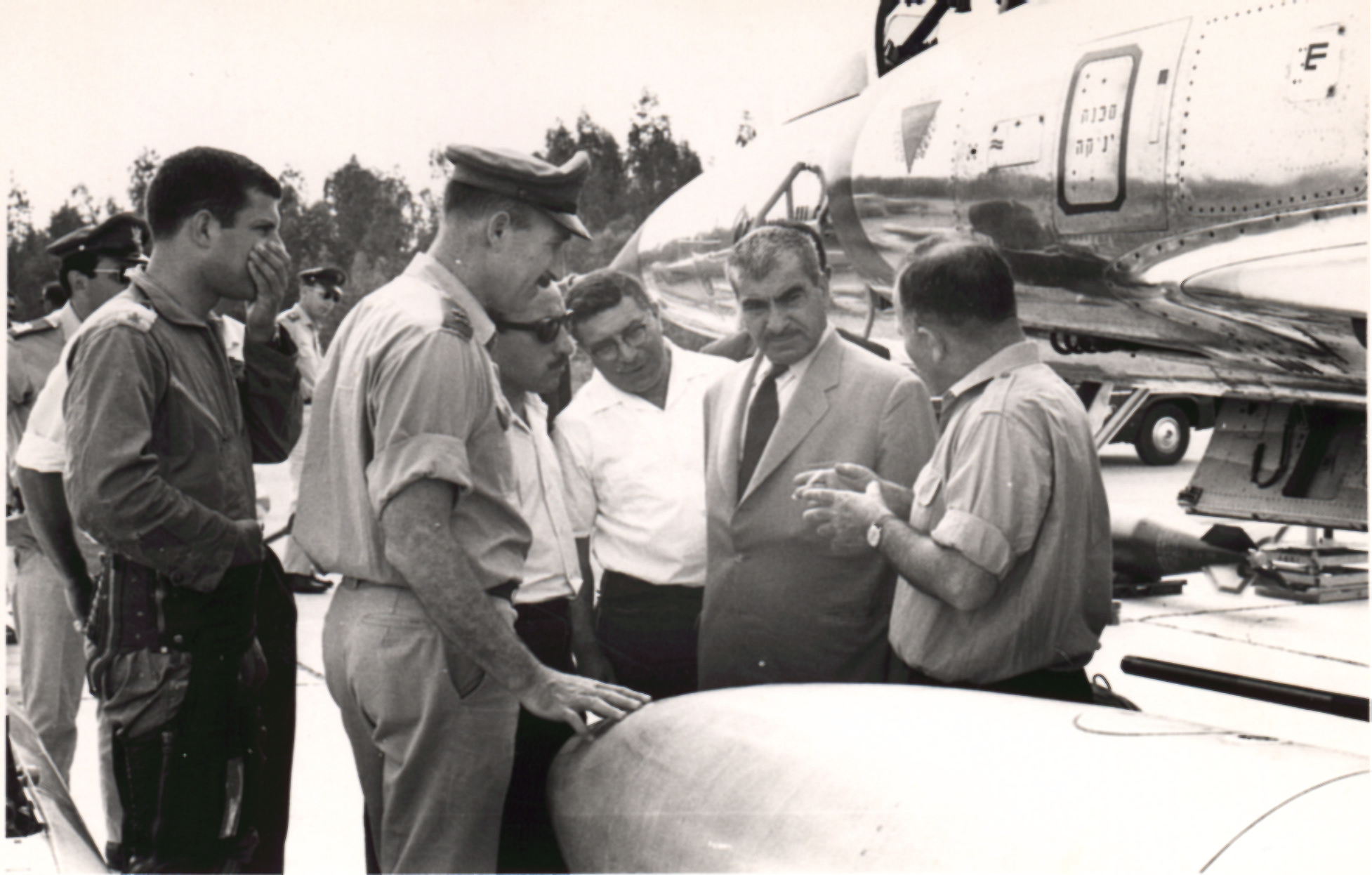
Mullah Mustafa Barzani (right, facing) received in Israel (date unknown).

Iraq participated in the Arab-Israeli wars of the Six Days in June 1967, then and the Kippur in October 1973. Since these two conflicts, unlike Egypt and Jordan which made peace with Israel in 1978 and 1994, Iraq, like Syria, refused to recognize Israel.

In 1978, the Camp David peace agreements between Egypt and Israel caused the rupture of diplomatic relations between Baghdad and Cairo. Upon his arrival at the presidency in 1979, Saddam Hussein kept the opposition against Israel. For its part, Israel attacked and destroyed the Iraqi nuclear research reactor Osirak under construction, during Operation Opera in 1981.

Since the overthrow of Saddam Hussein in 2003, despite a reversal of Iraqi foreign policy marked by a rapprochement with several former enemies of Iraq such as the United States, Iran and Syria, Israeli-Iraqi relations remain at a standstill.

In 2014, supporters of the independence of Iraqi Kurdistan again solicited support from Israel in their autonomist project. This contact attracted the attention of the Financial Times whose investigation revealed in 2015 the oil exports from Iraqi Kurdistan to Israel (via the pipeline connecting Kirkuk to Ceyhan, from where the oil is transported by tankers to the port of Haifa).

=== Relations with Palestine ===
In May 2025, Baghdad hosted an international summit in support of the Gaza Strip bombed by the Israeli army, providing for a fund of 50 billion dollars intended for the reconstruction of the Palestinian territory.

== Relations with European and Western countries ==
=== Relations with the United Kingdom ===
==== Iraq under British influence between 1920 and 1958 ====
The history of relations between Great Britain and Iraq dates back to the creation of Iraq in 1920, when in the First World War, the British were concerned with controlling the oil fields on which the British navy depended. The Mesopotamian campaign saw the British army oppose the Ottoman Empire in the context of the great Arab revolt of 1916-1918 against the Turks, fueled by the British who sent liaison officers to the Sharif of Mecca Hussein bin Ali, including T.E. Lawrence known as "Lawrence of Arabia".

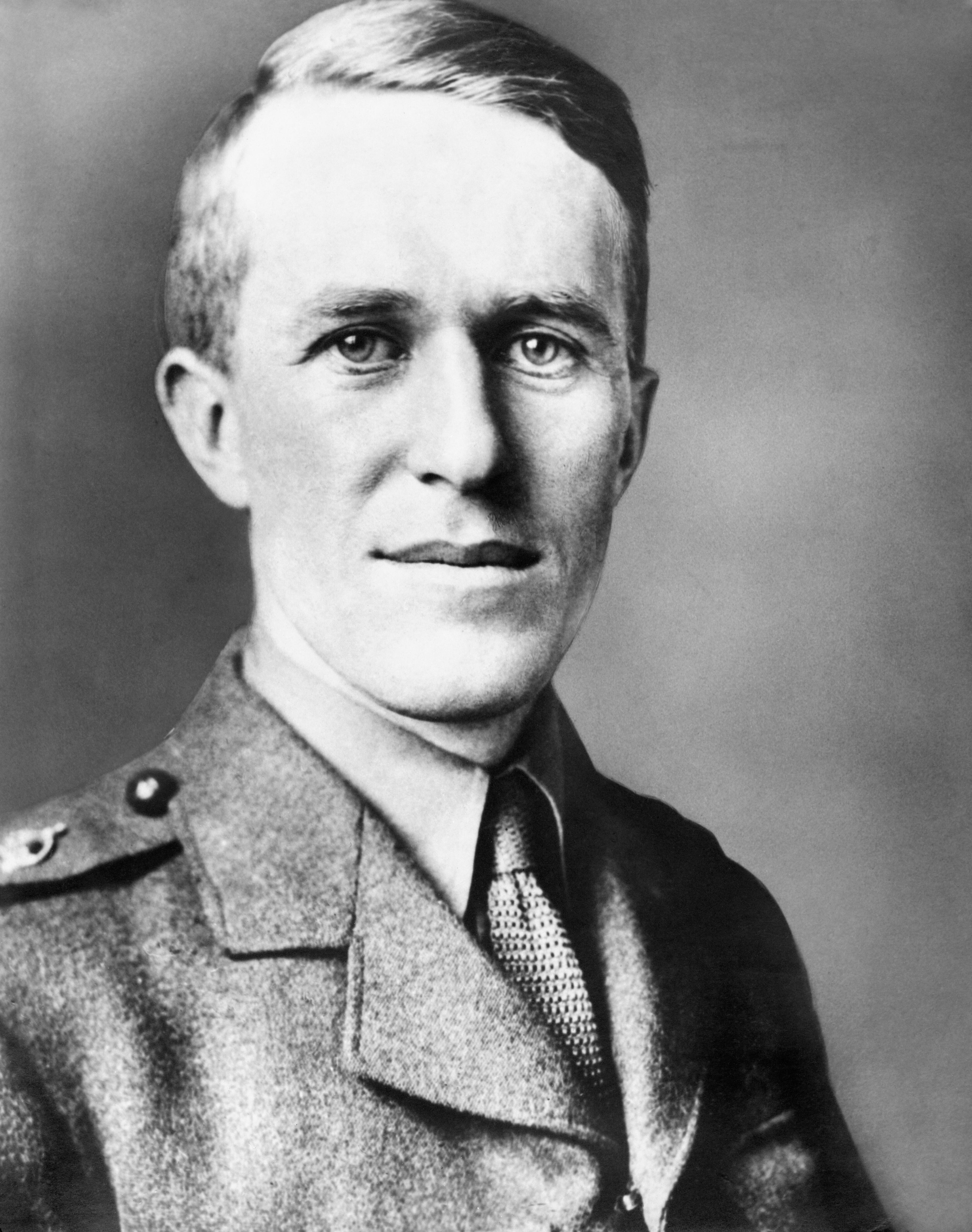
The Welsh officer T. E. Lawrence, known as "Lawrence of Arabia", major actor in the British victory in the Middle East during World War I.

The Indian troops under British command took the city of Basra in November 1914, whose port infrastructure was developed by the allies to supply the Middle Eastern front with men and materials. The city of Baghdad was taken in March 1917, which constituted a resounding political triumph and the first great British success of the war. British control of Mesopotamia was ratified by the Treaty of Sèvres signed after the 1918 armistice, in August 1920. This treaty was supposed to grant the Kurdish populations an independent state, but this treaty was canceled and replaced by the Treaty of Lausanne (1923), more favorable to Turkey, after the victory of Turkish troops during the Turkish War of Independence between 1919 and 1922.

After the enthronement by the British of Faisal I on the throne of Iraq, the British wished Iraq to recognize their mandate by a treaty; this was signed on 10 October 1922 then ratified on 10 June 1924. This treaty allowed Great Britain to oppose the decisions of the Iraqi government, while a British high commissioner controlled Iraqi policy.

The British occupation of Mesopotamia provoked strong resentment from the Arab populations, to whom the British had promised independence by supporting their revolt against the Ottomans. The British Mandate for Mesopotamia lasted until 1932, date on which the Kingdom of Iraq acceded to independence (while remaining a satellite state of Great Britain), and integrated the League of Nations. At the beginning of the Second World War, a coup d'état in Iraq brought Rashid Ali al-Gaylani to power as Prime Minister. He oriented the kingdom's policy towards neutrality, then towards rapprochement with the Axis powers, provoking the Anglo-Iraqi War won by the British in 1941, who occupied Iraq until 1945.

==== 1958 Iraqi Revolution ====
Iraq remained a satellite of Great Britain until the Iraqi revolution of July 14, 1958. In 1955 the Baghdad Pact established a military alliance between Iraq, Turkey, Pakistan, Iran and the United Kingdom, but Iraq withdrew in 1959 following the change of regime. After 1958, although the revolution was carried out with anti-imperialist motivations, Iraq under the mandate of Abd al-Karim Qasim maintained close ties with London, which accommodated its rapprochement with the Soviet Union.

The Ba'ath party takeover in 1968 did not affect relations between Iraq and the United Kingdom, which supported Saddam Hussein during the Iran–Iraq War between 1980 and 1988. But these deteriorated following the Invasion of Kuwait, while the United Kingdom was one of the main contributors, in military and materials, of the international coalition opposed to the Iraqi army.

==== British military interventions alongside the United States ====
During the decade following the end of the Gulf War, the United Kingdom carried out alongside the United States a series of observation flights and airstrikes on Iraqi targets, to fight against the "nuclear, chemical and biological armament programs" and to enforce the no-fly zone imposed by the coalition on the Iraqi army. In 2003, the initiative of the United States to invade Iraq was widely contested in Europe and the Middle East, unlike the Gulf War which had gathered a large coalition.

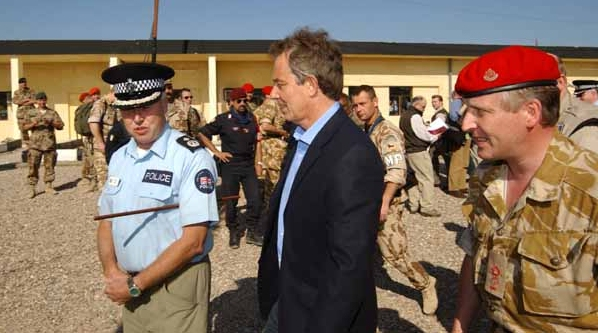
Tony Blair, British Prime Minister from 1997 to 2007, main Western head of state with US President George W. Bush responsible for the 2003 Iraq War, visiting Iraq in 2005.

Nevertheless, the heads of state of eight countries including Great Britain announced in a joint letter that they stood behind Washington, while France, Russia and Germany called for the continuation of inspections in Iraq. On 16 March 2003, Washington, London and Madrid announced a final attempt to have the UN endorse an ultimatum authorizing the use of force against Iraq. The three states renounced the next day to put their resolution to the vote at the UN, while operation "Iraqi Freedom" was launched four days later by an American-British coalition.

In total, about 45,000 British soldiers participated in the war between 2003 and 2009, causing 179 deaths in their ranks. During this period, two personalities of the British royal family went to Iraq to meet their troops deployed there: Prince Charles III and Prince Philip, son and husband of Queen Elizabeth II, in 2004 and 2006. In July 2016, an inquiry commission on the United Kingdom's engagement in the Iraq War published a report denouncing a "premature" intervention decided "before all peaceful alternatives to obtain (the country's) disarmament were exhausted".

==== Since the fall of Saddam Hussein ====
During the second Iraqi civil war, the United Kingdom took part in air operations in Iraq against the Islamic State, initially sending six Panavia Tornado fighter planes stationed at the Akrotiri base, in southern Cyprus. In parallel, limited ground operations were carried out by British special forces.

In May 2023, the Duchess of Edinburgh Sophie Rhys-Jones, wife of Prince Edward and sister-in-law of King Charles III, went to Baghdad where she met Prime Minister Mohammed Shia' Al Sudani, President Abdul Latif Rashid and his wife Shanaz Ibrahim Ahmed, as well as Iraqi feminist activists.

In August 2024, the British oil giant BP signed an agreement with Iraq to develop four oil and gas fields in Kirkuk province. In January 2025, a new oil and gas exploitation agreement was signed in London between the British company and the Iraqi government. Mohammed Shia' Al Sudani, on a trip to the United Kingdom for the first time since the beginning of his term, was received by his counterpart Keir Starmer, as well as by King Charles III at Buckingham Palace. His visit focused on economic, energy, commercial, and security cooperation between the two countries.

=== Relations with the United States ===
==== During the Cold War ====
In 1958, the overthrow of the monarchy replaced by a republican government provoked tensions between Iraq and the United States. This was explained by the influence of the Iraqi Communist Party in Iraq, the pro-Soviet policy of the new government and Iraqi hostility to any Western military presence in the Middle East.

Only the interlude of the two governments of the Aref brothers (1963-1968) gave hope that Iraq would return to the Western fold, but the Arab-Israeli war of June 1967 and American support for Israel led to the Ba'athists overthrowing Aref in 1968 and displayed their hostility towards Washington. In 1973, Iraq participated in the Arab consultation causing the first oil shock which severely penalized Western economies. Meanwhile, Washington provided material and military support not only to Israel, but also to the autonomist project of Iraq's Kurds led by Mullah Mustafa Barzani.

The year 1979 was marked by several events that created the conditions for a rapprochement between Iraq and the United States. The main one was the Islamic Revolution in Iran, which went from strategic ally to Washington's worst enemy in the region, following which Iraq and the United States became objective allies against the Iranian threat; the arrival of Saddam Hussein to the presidency of Iraq, whose repression of the Iraqi Communist Party distanced Iraq from the Soviet Union. His arrival was also accompanied by a détente in relations between Iraq and the pro-American Saudi monarchy; the Israeli-Egyptian peace agreements which, if they caused a rupture in relations between Iraq and pro-American Egypt, reduced Arab pressure on Israel and made Iraq a "manageable" threat although still real for the Hebrew state.

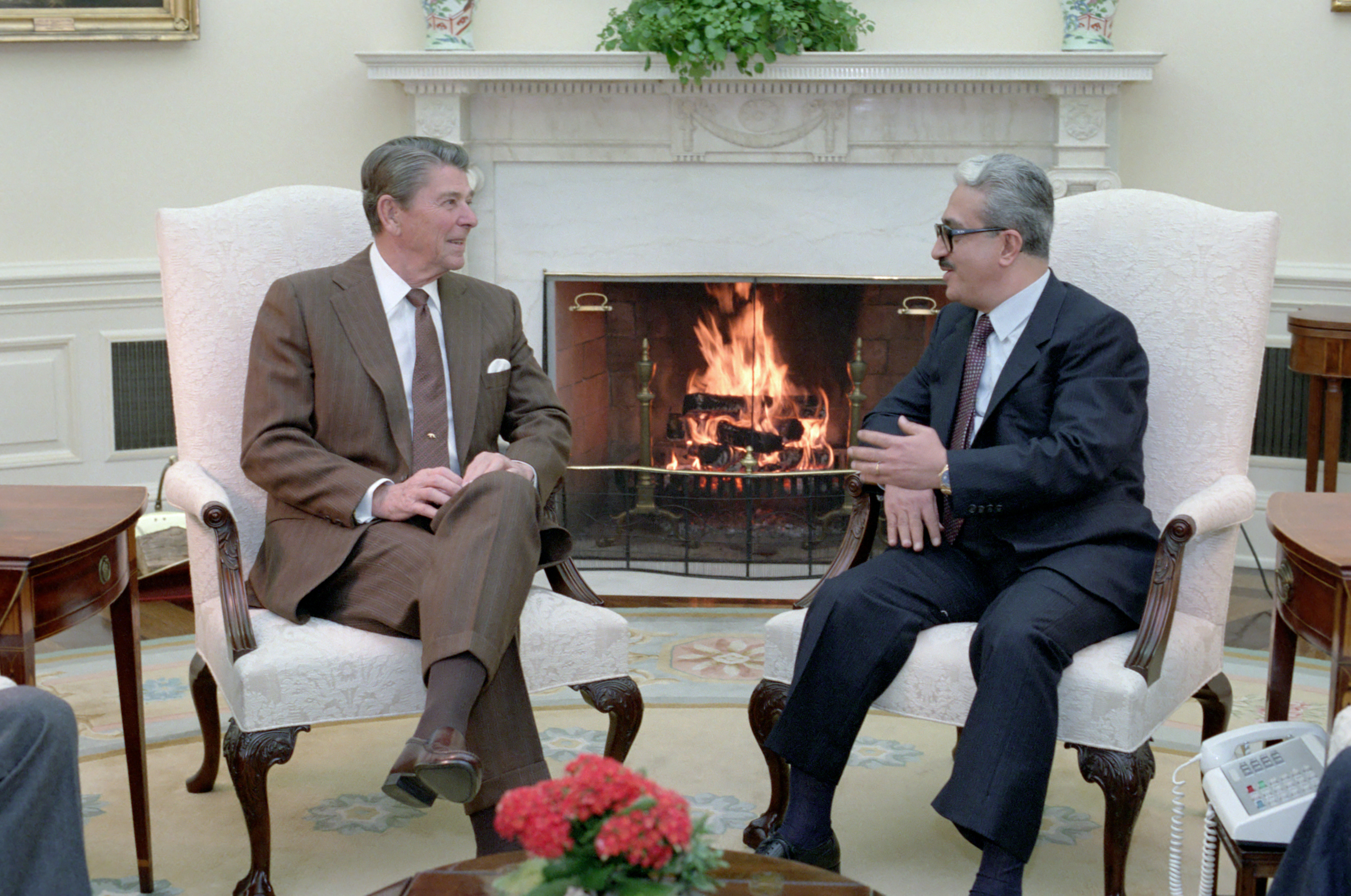
Meeting at the White House in 1984 between Tareq Aziz, Iraqi Foreign Minister from 1983 to 1991 and US President Ronald Reagan from 1981 to 1989.

These conditions favorable to a rapprochement between Iraq and the United States, which materialized by a resumption of their diplomatic relations in 1984. The Iran–Iraq War begun in 1980 did not fit into the framework of a confrontation between the East-West blocs, each of the belligerents having allies and enemies in one camp and the other. The United States took the side of Iraq in a context of strong tensions with Iran following the hostage-taking of the American embassy in Tehran, and sealed in 1983 a military cooperation agreement with Saddam Hussein, considered the only one in the region able to oppose the mullahs' Iran. Nevertheless, the Iran-Contra scandal has since revealed that American weapons and funding were also provided to Iran during this war (although at a very lower level than the support provided to Iraq).

==== Wars and embargo between 1991 and 2011 ====
The image of Iraq within the administration of George H. W. Bush deteriorated in 1989, when Iraq undertook to rearm and place itself at the center of inter-Arab relations by advocating a security system independent of the United States. The collapse of the Soviet Union, which de facto put an end to the bipolar system made it urgent for Saddam Hussein to prevent the region from falling under the exclusive control of the United States at the same time as it gave Iraq the opportunity to fill, at least partially, the void left by the Soviet withdrawal from the Middle East.

Relations between the United States and Iraq deteriorated following the Invasion of Kuwait, the United States taking the head of an international coalition opposed to the Iraqi army, which put an end to Saddam Hussein's expansionist ambitions and facilitated the birth of an autonomous Iraqi Kurdistan.

During the decade following the end of the Gulf War, relations between the two states remained broken, and an embargo was imposed by the United States on Iraq. The United States carried out a series of observation flights and airstrikes on Iraqi targets, to fight against the "nuclear, chemical and biological armament programs" and to enforce the no-fly zone imposed by the coalition on the Iraqi army. In October 1998, President Bill Clinton signed the "Iraq Liberation Act" voted by the US Congress, allowing financial support for the Iraqi opposition, exiled abroad. In December 1999, faced with suspicions that Iraq possessed weapons of mass destruction, the American and British armies bombed military objectives during operation "Desert Fox".

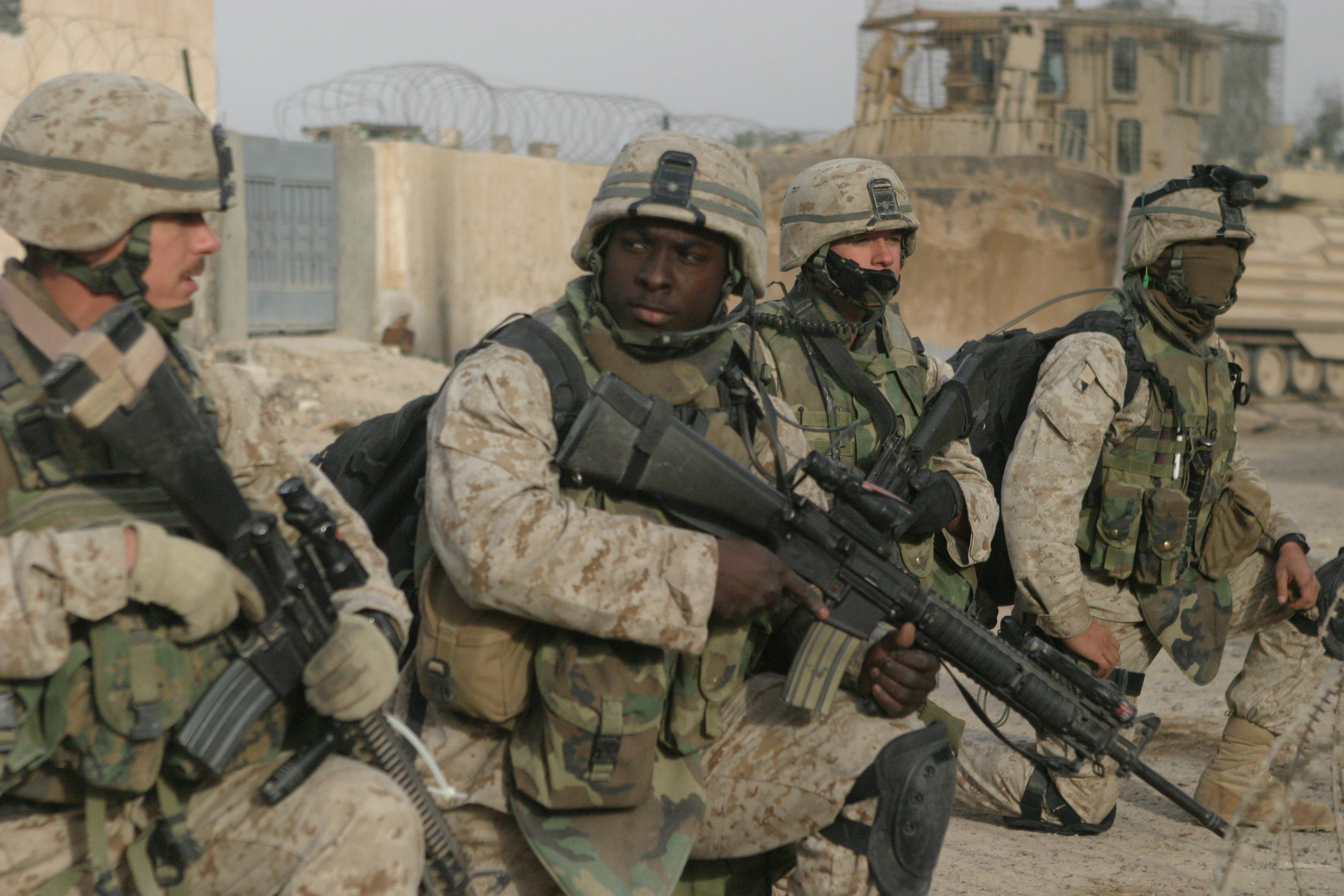
American Marines in Fallujah, November 26, 2004.

On 29 January 2002, the new US President George W. Bush, son of his predecessor George H. W. Bush, declared that Iraq, Iran and North Korea formed an "Axis of evil", against which he promised to act. The UN imposed on Iraq a disarmament program under the threat of an armed intervention by the United States. Despite Iraq's submission to the UN's injunctions, and strong international opposition to an armed intervention, the United States and their allies (mainly the United Kingdom) attacked Iraq on 20 March 2003 and overthrew Saddam Hussein's regime. After a lightning American victory over the Iraqi army, American General Jay Garner was appointed provisional civil administrator of Iraq, then replaced a month later by diplomat Paul Bremer, who put in place economic and social reforms. The UN Security Council resolution voted on 22 May 2003 ratified the American-British control of Iraq. Saddam Hussein was executed on 30 December 2006, after having been sentenced to death by an Iraqi tribunal.

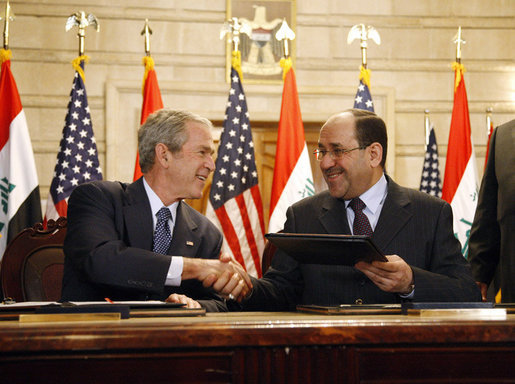
US President George W. Bush and Iraqi Prime Minister Nouri al-Maliki in Baghdad in 2008.

The war against Iraq ended with operation "New Dawn" which aimed to stabilize the country before the departure of the last American troops on 18 December 2011.

==== Rapprochement and cooperation since 2011 ====
Since the end of the Iraq War, the United States and Iraq consider themselves strategic partners, given the American political and military involvement alongside the post-2004 Iraqi governments. The United States provides each year significant military aid in equipment and training, and uses their military bases.

In 2014, during the second Iraqi civil war, the United States took the lead of the international coalition against the Islamic State in Iraq and Syria. The United States carried out about 90% of the airstrikes of this coalition against the jihadist group, while only 10% were carried out by other Arab and Western members. The United States also sent 1,500 military advisers to Iraq in 2014, then 450 men as reinforcements in June 2015, bringing American forces in Iraq to 3,500 men.

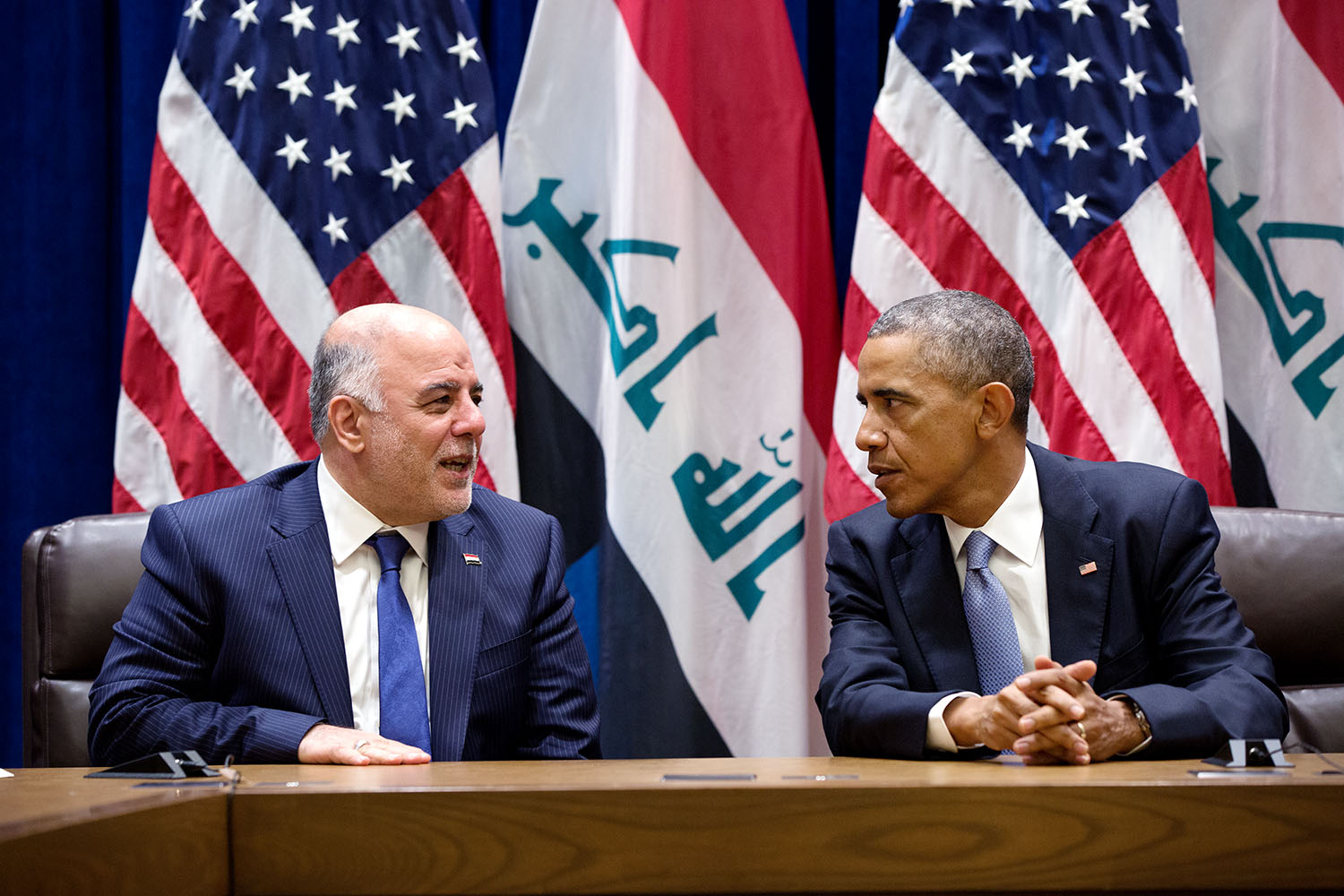
Exchanges between Iraqi Prime Minister Haider al-Abadi (from 2014 to 2018), and US President Barack Obama (from 2009 to 2017) in New York in 2014.

In 2019, a year after the defeat of the Islamic State, more than 5,000 American soldiers were still stationed in Iraq, while the United States participated in the reconstruction and consolidation of certain official Iraqi institutions. In parallel, the United States pressured Iraq to force it to apply the American embargo imposed by Donald Trump on Iran, putting the Iraqi government in great difficulty faced with the impossibility of complying with such an injunction due to its economic dependence on Iran. In October 2018, Prime Minister Haider al-Abadi, hesitating to pronounce himself before the Iraqi parliament on the American sanctions imposed on Iran, was overthrown by a coalition of pro-Iranian deputies reproaching him for his lack of firmness towards Washington.

Relations between Iraq and the United States deteriorated during the 2019-2020 American-Iranian crisis marked by a series of clashes between American and pro-Iranian forces on Iraqi soil, whose culmination was the targeted assassination of General Qasem Soleimani and the leader of the Iranian-backed Shiite Iraqi militias Abu Mahdi al-Muhandis by an American drone on 3 January 2020.

Important anti-American demonstrations took place in Iraq (of which Iran was also the target), while the Iraqi Parliament voted a resolution asking the government to put an end to the presence of foreign troops in Iraq. This decision was rejected by US President Donald Trump who declared that a withdrawal of American troops "would be the worst thing that could happen to Iraq", and threatened Iraq with economic sanctions in case of expulsion by Iraq of the American troops deployed there. This threat of sanctions was worrying for Baghdad whose oil revenues which provide 90% of the state budget, are paid to it in dollars on an account at the US Federal Reserve, to which the United States could block access.

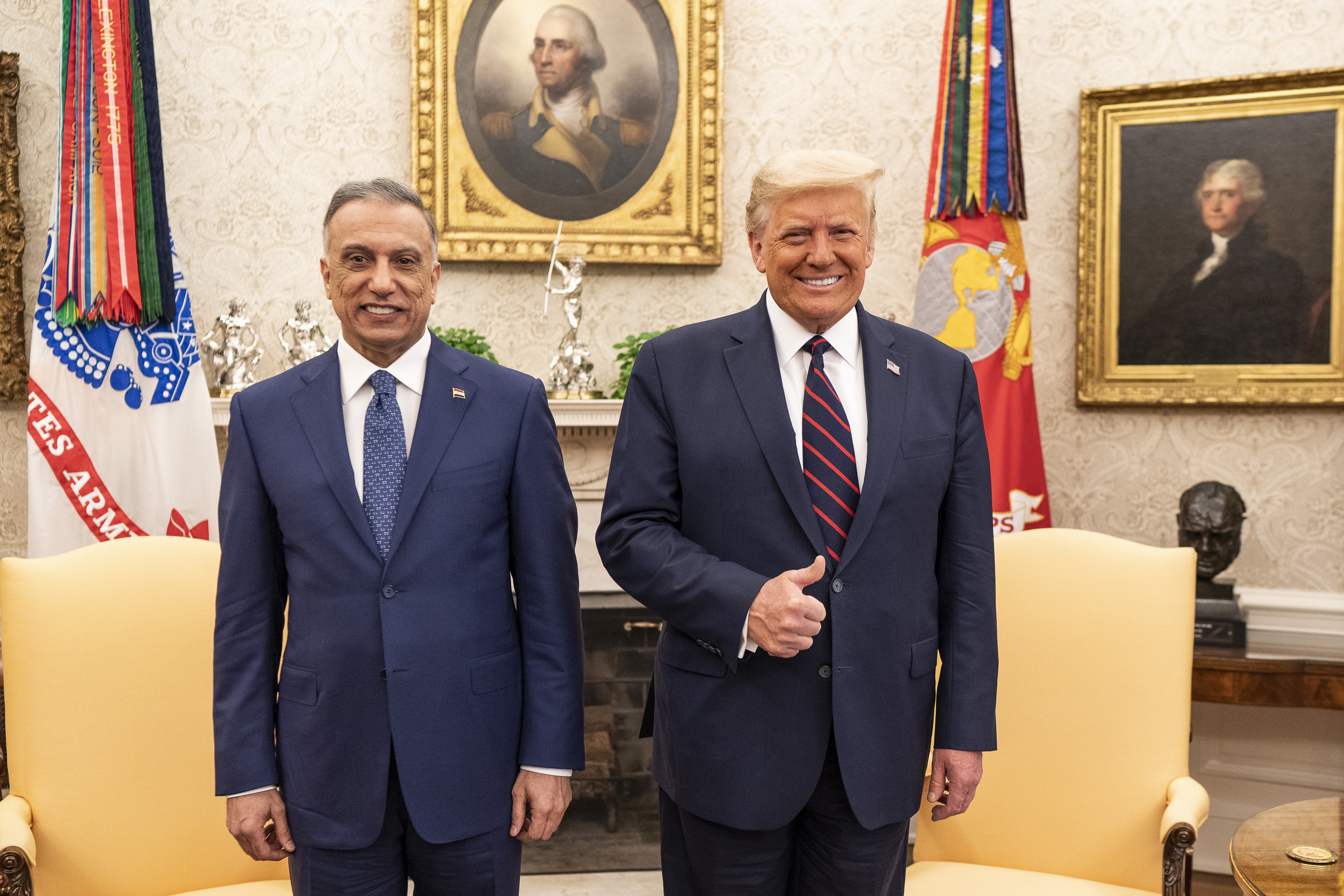
Iraqi Prime Minister Mustafa Al-Kadhimi received at the White House by US President Donald Trump in August 2020.

In May 2020, Mustafa Al-Kadhimi, head of Iraqi intelligence, major actor and fight against the Islamic State in Iraq and close to the United States, became Prime Minister of Iraq. His post and his pro-American orientation made him suspected by pro-Iran factions of having been complicit in the assassination of Qasem Soleimani. But his talents as diplomat and negotiator made him gradually accepted by the majority of rival political actors, in Iraq and internationally.

In January 2021, an Iraqi court issued an arrest warrant against US President Donald Trump as part of the investigation into the elimination of Abu Mahdi al-Muhandis. In March 2021, the American administration of Joe Biden elected four months earlier declared granting an additional three-month delay to the Iraqi government to comply with the sanctions imposed by Washington on Iran, a week before a "strategic dialogue" planned for 7 April 2021 by videoconference.

In July 2021, Iraqi Prime Minister Mustafa al-Kadhimi received in Baghdad Brett McGurk, White House emissary for the Middle East and former supervisor of the international military coalition against the Islamic State in Iraq and Syria. Two weeks later, he went to the United States for a several-day visit, and met President Joe Biden, new phase of the American military presence in Iraq, with an end to combat operations by 31 December 2021, replaced by a mission of advice and training. The US President did not specify how many soldiers would remain on site, but it appeared in 2022 that about 2,000 American soldiers were still deployed on Iraqi soil. In January 2023, Iraqi Prime Minister Mohammed Shia' Al Sudani declared, although more favorable to Iran than to the United States, that he still needed American troops to fight the Islamic State in Iraq. He further declared believing in the possibility that Iraq maintain good relations "both with Iran and with the United States". The following month, he received the US Secretary of Defense Lloyd Austin in Baghdad in the presence of his Iraqi counterpart Thabit al-Abbasi, and affirmed to him his desire to "strengthen and consolidate" its ties with Washington. The Secretary of Defense, while expressing his optimism in the continuation of bilateral relations between Washington and Baghdad, declared for his part that the American military deployed in Iraq could remain there if the Iraqi government requested it. This subject was still delicate and divisive given the recent history of the two countries, this meeting marking the 20 years of the Iraq War which began in March 2003. In October 2023, the resumption of the war between Israel and Hamas cooled Iraqi-American relations, Baghdad reproaching Washington for its unconditional support for the Hebrew state, while clashes multiplied between American soldiers deployed in the Middle East and pro-Iranian militias, notably in Iraq. The following month, Antony Blinken went to Baghdad, his first visit to Iraq as head of American diplomacy, and met Mohammed Shia' Al Sudani, for an interview focused on tensions in the Middle East and the need to preserve Iraq from them.

In April 2024, Mohammed Shia' Al Sudani went to Washington for the first time since taking office in October 2022, with the main objective of promoting American economic engagement in Iraq. He met President Joe Biden, Defense Secretary Lloyd Austin, US Secretary of State Antony Blinken, and the president's senior advisor for Energy and Investments Amos Hochstein. If no military official was part of the Iraqi delegation, military cooperation was also on the agenda, notably a potential sale for 140 million dollars including logistical support and pilot training aid on Iraqi C-172 and AC/RC-208 aircraft. In November, following the election of Donald Trump for a second term as President of the United States, Mohamed Shia' Al Sudani addressed him a message of congratulations in which he expressed his wish to "consolidate bilateral relations" with Washington "on the basis of mutual respect and common interests".

In April 2025, Iraq signed a memorandum of understanding with the American energy giant GE Vernova for gas power plants and the production of 24,000 megawatts of electricity. Mohamed Shia' Al Sudani congratulated himself on the "largest and most modern project in Iraq's history, with the possibility of obtaining external financing from international banks".

=== Relations with Russia ===
==== Soviet influence on Iraq during the Cold War ====
The Iraqi Communist Party founded in 1934 was an important actor in the rapprochement between Iraq and the USSR (although this party never governed in Iraq), whose bilateral relations were, during the Cold War, largely influenced by those between this party and the Iraqi government. In the 1930s, the Iraqi population constituted fertile ground for the spread of communism. On the one hand, southern Iraq hosted disadvantaged rural environments receptive to a discourse on equality and social progress; on the other hand, the ideologies of Shi'ism and communism have several common ideas: equality, the fight against injustice, opposition to the monarchy, and the defense of the oppressed.

The 1958 Iraqi revolution put an end to the reign of the pro-Western monarchy, brought General Abd al-Karim Qasim to power, communist militant (although non-member of the ICP) and led to Iraq's withdrawal from the Baghdad Pact, military alliance constituted against the Soviet Union. Naziha al-Dulaimi feminist militant and ICP cadre, joined the Iraqi republican government, thus becoming the first woman minister in the Arab world. After establishing diplomatic relations with the USSR, Baghdad sent a delegation to Moscow on 16 March 1959, received by Nikita Khrushchev, who declared:

It is natural that we pay more attention to governments and countries that make the interests of their people a priority. From the bottom of our heart, we salute Abd al-Karim Qasim, the Iraqi Prime Minister who leads his country on the path of progress to strengthen the Republic of Iraq, and we wish him much success.

Nevertheless, the attitude of the young Republic of Iraq towards communism at the end of the 1950s remained ambivalent. On the one hand, the Iraqi Shiite clergy (including Muhammad Baqir al-Sadr, father-in-law of Muqtada al-Sadr), worried about the spread of non-religious ideas in the population, issued a fatwa against communism. On the other hand, the Iraqi government was worried about the rise in power of the ICP which it perceived as a threat to its power. In March 1959 in Mosul, tensions degenerated into clashes between the Iraqi army and militants of the ICP who demanded more participation in the government. The armed Kurdish groups rallied to the communists, and Mosul was bombed by the Iraqi army. When the Ba'ath party came to power in 1968, it also repressed communist militants at first. But in 1970, the death of Nasser distanced Egypt from the Soviet Union (Anwar Sadat officially made it pass into the American camp in 1976), pushing the latter to seek new Arab allies, and at the same time, to secure its oil supply. Aware of this opportunity and in search of legitimacy on the international scene, the new Iraqi government made peace with the ICP, and Saddam Hussein, vice-president of Iraq went to Moscow to reaffirm the ties between the Soviet Union and Iraq. Wary at first, the Pravda finally accepted this outstretched hand, and in January 1971, sent to Iraq economic, trade union, cultural, scientific, and political delegations. In February 1972, Ahmad Hassan al-Bakr and Saddam Hussein went again to the USSR, and committed to deepening their relations with Moscow, which announced for Iraq aid in the oil sector and support for the "struggle of the Arab peoples in the Arabian Gulf". Ahmad Hassan al-Bakr signed a treaty of friendship and cooperation with his Soviet counterpart Alexei Kosygin. With this agreement, Moscow ambitious to substitute Iraq for Egypt as the pillar of its influence in the Middle East. On the national level, a pact bringing together the Ba'ath party, the communist party and the Kurdish Democratic Party was signed in 1973, and allowed two communist ministers to enter the government, although only the Ba'athists held power within the Revolutionary Command Council. The communists, denouncing this state of affairs, were excluded from the government in 1977, and suffered new repression in May and July 1978. This caused a new cooling of its relations with the Soviet Union, which Iraq compensated by a rapprochement with France of Valéry Giscard d'Estaing.

Two years later, the attack on Iran by Iraq placed Pravda in a delicate position. Although linked to Iraq by the 1972 treaties, the use of Russian weapons to bomb Iran pushed the Soviet Union to reduce its deliveries, attracting violent criticism from Saddam Hussein, who at the same time, condemned the Soviet invasion of Afghanistan (1979-1989). The objective of the Soviets in the Middle East was then to forge relations with the "anti-imperialist" governments, which included the socialist Arab countries (including the Democratic Republic of Afghanistan), but also Iran, become enemy of the United States after the 1979 revolution.

==== Decade between the disintegration of the USSR and the Iraq War ====
The year 1991 was simultaneously marked by the Gulf War and by the disintegration of the Soviet Union, which made Russia an independent state with a strongly reduced zone of influence. The following years, Russia's attitude was characterized by a wait-and-see attitude and skepticism in matters of security and defense, in a "new world order" very largely dominated by the United States and NATO.

But post-Soviet Russia showed itself always cooperative with Iraq, which it supported politically against the United States, after the imposition of American economic sanctions in 1995. Russia participated notably in the "Oil for Food" program. Between 1990 and 1997, several Russian companies signed with Iraq agreements for the delivery of 25.2 million barrels of Iraqi crude. At the beginning of the year 2000, after the designation of Vladimir Putin to the presidency of Russia on an interim basis (before his election in March), Saddam Hussein addressed him in a letter his desire to maintain and develop the "traditional good relations of friendship and cooperation between Iraq and Russia".

==== Russia-Iraq relations since 2003 ====
In 2003, Vladimir Putin's Russia was part with France and Germany of the "Axis of Peace", opposed to an armed intervention against Iraq as long as all peaceful means to negotiate Saddam Hussein have not all been exploited. This Paris Berlin-Moscow axis denied the United States the legitimacy of the "self-defense" thesis and of a "necessary solidary organization of world security", considering this invasion as a rejection of the UN, of multilateralism, and of international conventions. Paradoxically, it was the American military intervention leading to the overthrow of Saddam Hussein that allowed the Iraqi Communist Party to be reborn and to become active again on the Iraqi political scene.

The following year, Russia offered Iraq humanitarian assistance, in the form of medicines and medical equipment, blankets and tents, heating and lighting equipment, as well as books in Russian intended for University of Baghdad. The large Russian oil companies Lukoil and Rosneft are moreover among the main foreign investors in the country. In 2005, Russia became an observer state (but non-member) of the Organisation of Islamic Cooperation.

Between 2004 and 2017, Russia suspended its commercial air links with Iraq due to the degradation of security in the country plagued by two successive civil wars. But at the same time, Russia and Iraq established an important military collaboration, which reached its peak during the second term of Prime Minister Nouri al-Maliki to whom the United States hesitated to deliver F-16s. In 2015, Iraq and Russia allied to set up an intelligence center in Baghdad to fight against the Islamic State, while Russia intervened militarily in neighboring Syria at war against the same jihadist group.

Russian military support for the Alawite Syrian regime against Sunni rebels, and good Russian-Iranian diplomatic relations, allowed Russian President Vladimir Putin to acquire immense popularity in the Shiite countries and communities of the Middle East, notably Iraq. While a growing number of Shiite leaders see him as a guardian of their holy places, an Iraqi legend makes him a "son of the region" immigrated to Russia, originally from Nasiriyah (near Basra), whose original name would be "Abdel Amir Aboul-Tine", become Vladimir Putin. This rumor, although improbable, is viewed favorably by Moscow, and skillfully maintained by Russian propaganda via local relays.

From 2016, Russia got closer to OPEC of which Iraq is part, to face the growing American competition due to the shale oil boom and the fall in the barrel price that resulted. In March 2018, for the first time in Iraq's history, the Shiite religious party of Moqtada al-Sadr formed an alliance with the ICP for the Iraqi legislative elections, entitled "The March for Reforms". This coalition came first with nearly one and a half million votes.

In February 2022, the invasion of Ukraine by Russia, placed Iraqis in an ambivalent position: compassionate towards the Ukrainians invaded and bombed by a great military power like Iraq in 2003, but also towards the Russians suffering severe international sanctions like Iraq in the 1990s. Officially, Baghdad adopted a position of neutrality given its ties with the United States on one side, and to a lesser extent with Russia on the other, and abstained during the vote at the UN General Assembly on 2 March.

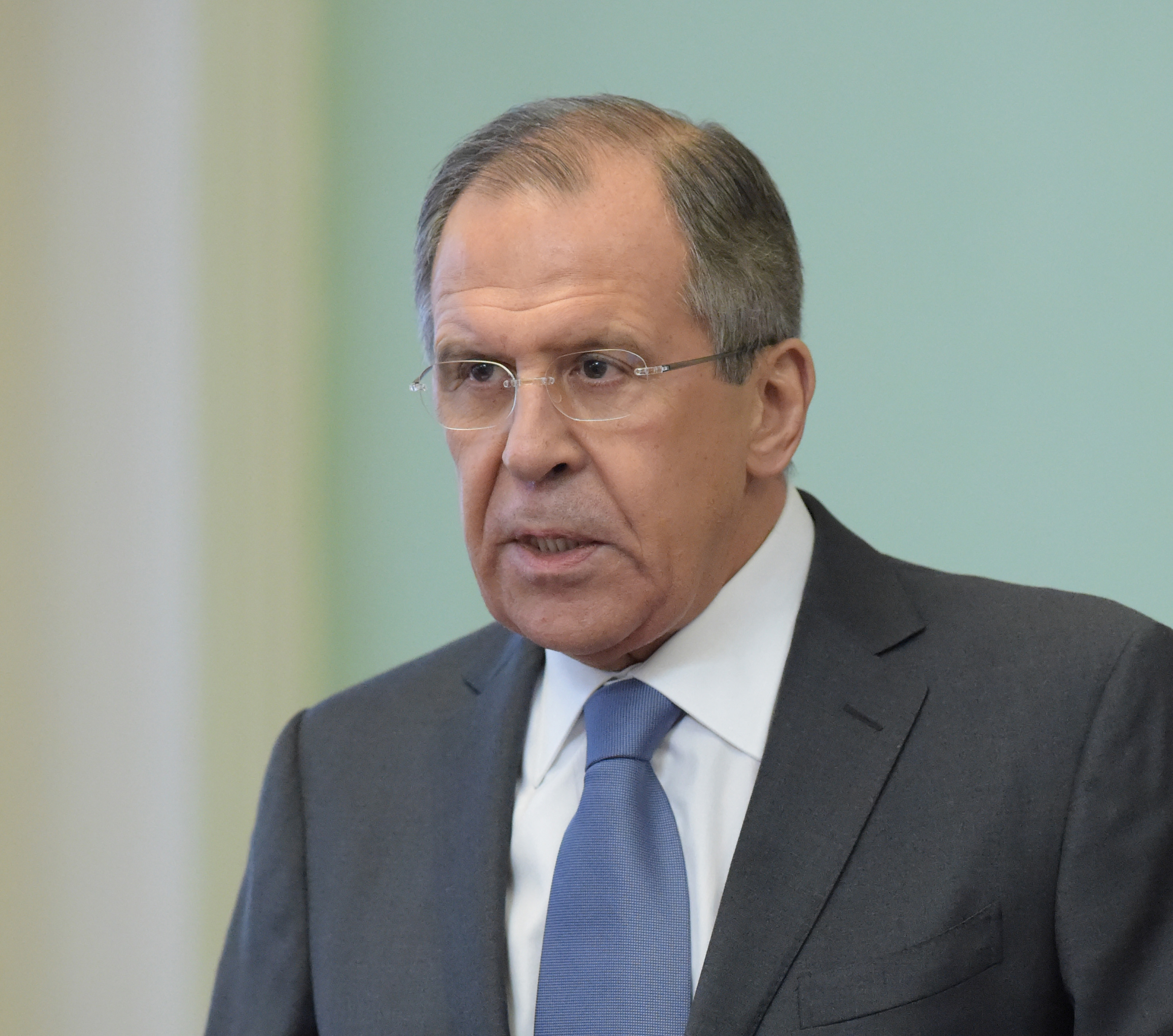
Sergey Lavrov

A year later, in February 2023, while the war in Ukraine continued in the east of the country, Russian Foreign Minister Sergey Lavrov went to Baghdad at the head of a delegation including representatives of oil and gas companies and investors. He met his Iraqi counterpart Fuad Hussein, Prime Minister Mohammed Shia' Al Sudani, President Abdul Latif Rashid, and Parliament Speaker Mohammed al-Halbousi. The spokesman for Iraqi diplomacy Ahmed al-Sahhaf declared that his country was favorable to "any dialogue process allowing to defuse this escalation and alleviate the crises [... ] particularly in the sectors of food security and energy", while the war in Ukraine led to a surge in wheat prices on international markets.

=== Relations with Ukraine ===
Until 1991, Ukraine was part of the Soviet Union, and its foreign policy vis-à-vis Iraq was aligned with that of Moscow. Since Ukraine's independence, the ties maintained by Baghdad and Kyiv are essentially cultural and educational, with many Iraqis having gone to study in Ukraine, mainly medicine. However, Ukrainian troops were part of the coalition that invaded Iraq alongside the United States between 2003 and 2005. The decision to take part in the Iraq War was that of a pro-Russian president Leonid Kuchma, while the decision to withdraw Ukrainian troops from Iraq was taken by the pro-Western president Viktor Yushchenko.

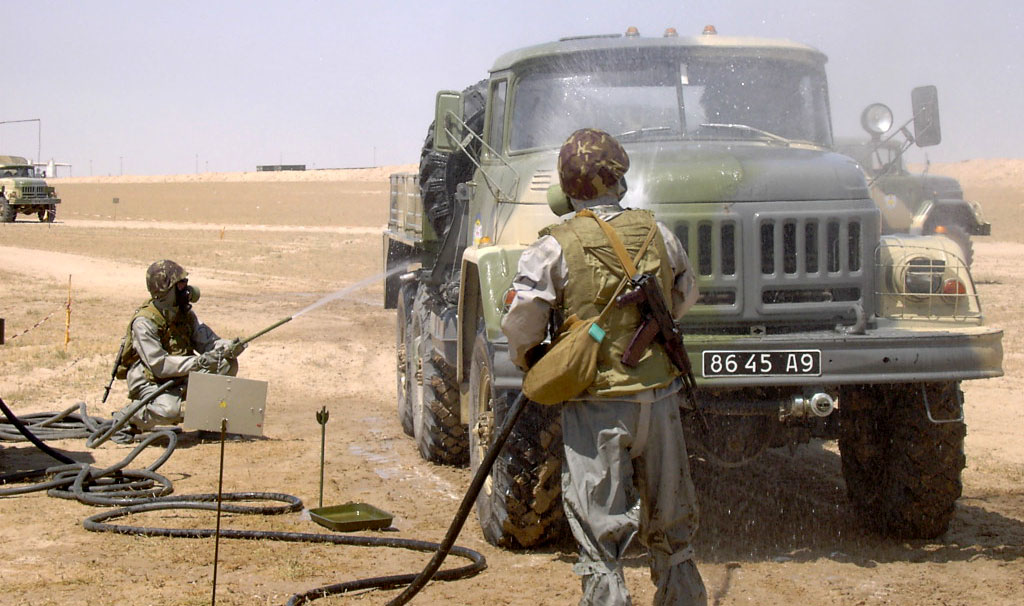
Members of the 19th Ukrainian NBC battalion in Kuwait in August 2003.

In April 2023, the Iraqi and Ukrainian heads of state Mohammed al-Sudani and Volodymyr Zelenskyy spoke by telephone, while Ukraine has been for more than a year in war against Russia in which Baghdad, which maintains good relations with Kyiv and with Moscow, prefers to remain neutral. The Iraqi Prime Minister conveyed to his Ukrainian interlocutor his support in the search for a peaceful solution to the conflict in a context where Baghdad has successfully illustrated itself by its mediation between Saudi Arabia and Iran. The following week, Ukrainian Foreign Minister Dmytro Kuleba went to Baghdad, marking the first visit of the Ukrainian Foreign Minister to Iraq since 2012. He met Mohammed al-Sudani as well as his counterpart Fuad Hussein whom he thanked for their solidarity with Ukraine at war, and with whom he evoked the future relations between Ukraine and Iraq.

=== Relations with France ===
The borders of Iraq and Syria stem from the Sykes–Picot Agreement of 1916, names of the British and French diplomats sharing the Arab territories of the Ottoman Empire during its fall. While Iraq became a British protectorate following the victory of the Allies in the Mesopotamian campaign, France received a mandate from the League of Nations to administer Syria and Lebanon.

After the Second World War, Iraq, in solidarity with Algeria in war of independence against France (between 1954 and 1962) broke its diplomatic relations with France in 1956, until the Évian Accords formalizing the independence of Algeria in 1962. But in the meantime, the 1958 Iraqi revolution, which took place on 14 July 1958 like the French Revolution of 1789, created a sympathy of the new Iraqi power towards France, the latter being inspired by republican ideals, and recalling that France had opposed the Baghdad Pact in 1955. Thus on 14 July 1958, the putschist generals alternated on "Radio Baghdad", the broadcast of Arab fields with La Marseillaise, making the distinction with the colonial France against which it was necessary to fight, and France of "human rights", source of inspiration. In the 1960s, following the restoration of Franco-Iraqi diplomatic relations, the sympathy of the Iraqi authorities for France created favorable conditions for a rapprochement, while General Charles de Gaulle reoriented his foreign policy in favor of Arab countries, to the detriment of Israel which he considered the aggressor in the Six-Day War.

The following year, when the Ba'ath Party took power, Saddam Hussein forged good personal relations with several French heads of state, particularly Valéry Giscard d'Estaing (nephew of François Georges-Picot), President from 1974 to 1981 and his Prime Minister Jacques Chirac.

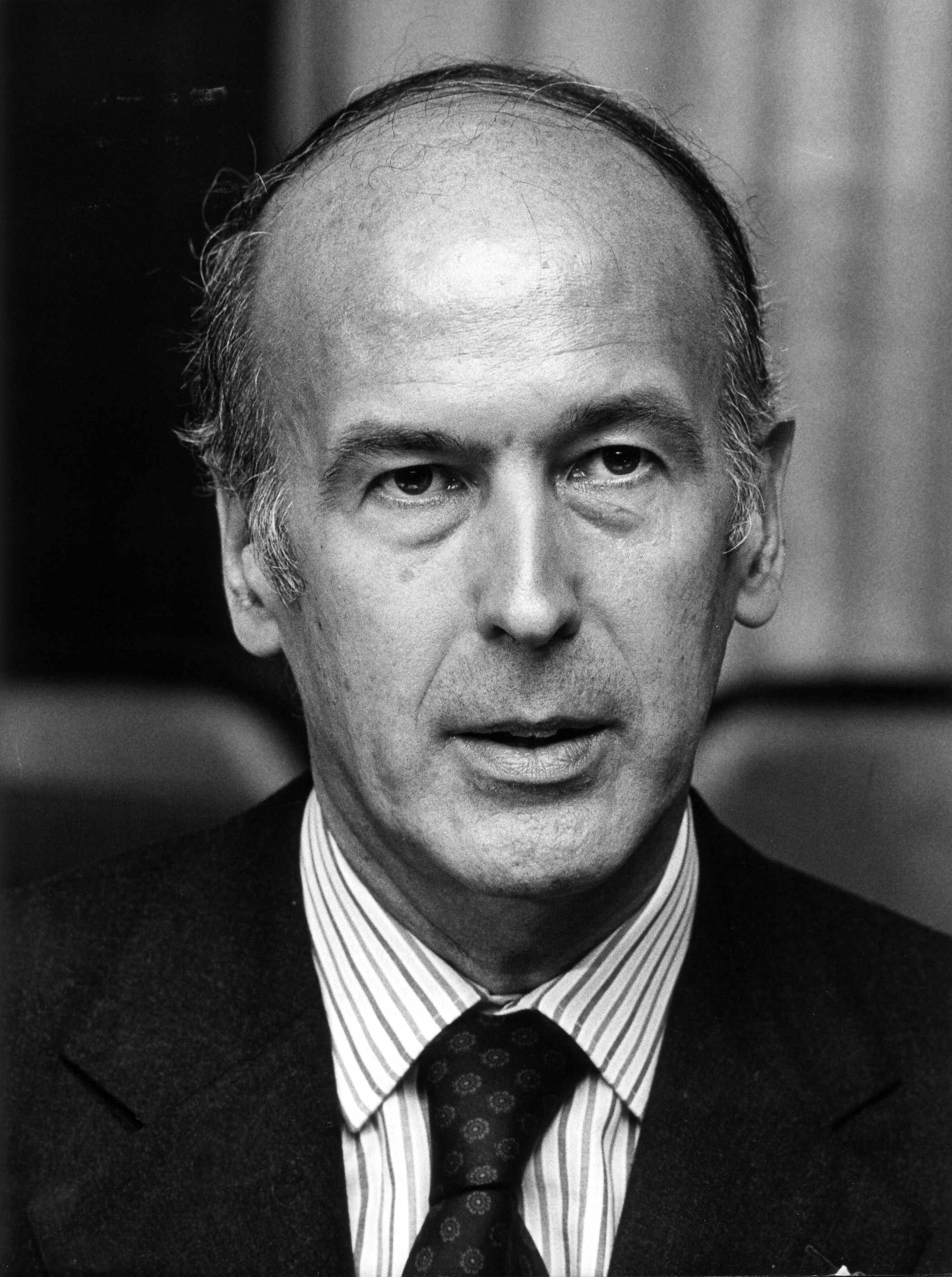
Valéry Giscard d'Estaing

Iraq then offered for Paris all the advantages to figure in the first rank of its Arab partners: a rich country, an interesting market by the importance of its population and by its large civil and military development projects, not dominated by the United States unlike the other Gulf countries, and whose regime sought to get out of its bilateral relation with the Soviet Union. In 1975, following a visit by Saddam Hussein to France, an agreement was signed on the supply by France of a nuclear research reactor, Osirak (destroyed in 1981 by the Israeli Air Force). In September 1976, France agreed to supply between 60 and 80 Mirages, then 200 AMX-30 tanks the following year. At the end of the 1970s France was Iraq's second most important trading partner after the Soviet Union as supplier of civilian and military equipment. France could justify this relation with an autocratic government by claiming to extract Iraq from the Soviet grip.

After the election of François Mitterrand in May 1981, the socialists announced their decision to maintain military commitments towards Iraq. Several weapons were delivered by France to Iraq during the war against Iran (notably five Super Étendard in 1983), while the "Franco-Iraqi Friendships" association was created in 1985 by Jean-Pierre Chevènement. At the end of the Iran-Iraq War in 1988, Iraq became again, notwithstanding its heavy debt towards Paris, an interesting market in which France counted on enjoying privileged treatment in recognition of its support during the war.

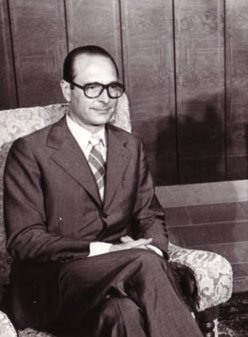
Jacques Chirac

France officially broke its diplomatic relations with Iraq following the invasion of Kuwait in 1990, but unofficially, French envoys present in Baghdad tried to negotiate a solution to the crisis. When the United States launched operation "Desert Storm", Jean-Pierre Chevènement, who became Minister of Defense in 1988, resigned from his post in protest against France's participation in the coalition against Iraq.

After Iraq's defeat in the Gulf War, France remained one of the few Western countries favorable to Iraq, although having participated in the bombings against the Iraqi army in 1991. In 1995, Jacques Chirac key personality of bilateral Franco-Iraqi relations after having been minister in the governments of Valéry Giscard d'Estaing and François Mitterrand, was elected President of France.

In 2003, France opposed the US military intervention in Iraq. Jacques Chirac, then at the beginning of his second term as president, declared: "Iraq does not represent today an immediate threat such that it justifies an immediate war". At the end of February 2003, Foreign Minister Dominique de Villepin delivered a speech before the United Nations Security Council, during which he declared: "a use of force would be so heavy with consequences for men, for the region and for international stability that it could only be envisaged as a last extremity". France even showed singular audacity by opposing, at the UN Security Council, the US project of invasion of Iraq. The following years, French and American diplomacies got closer on another file in the Middle East: the withdrawal of Syrian troops from Lebanon.

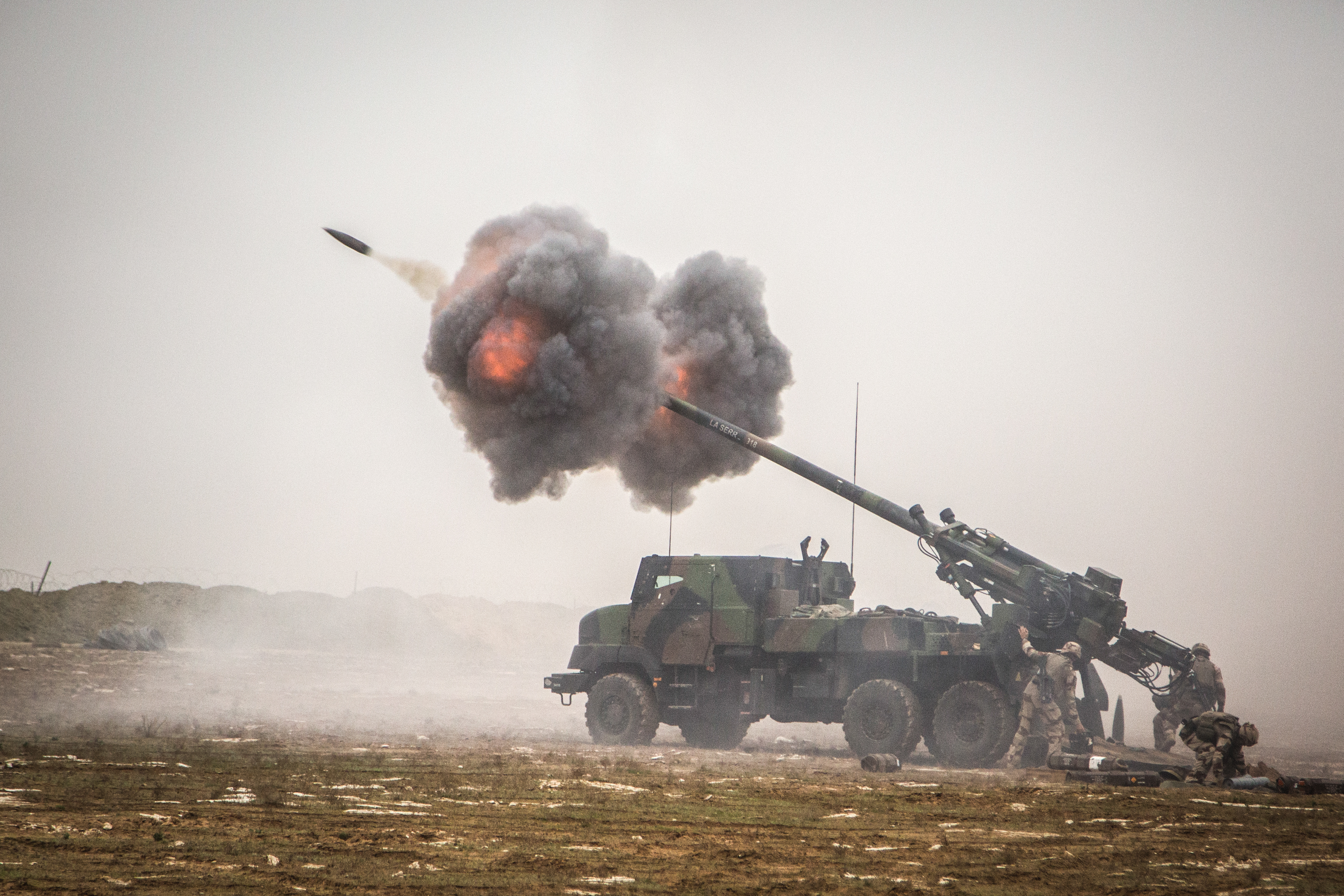
A French CAESAR gun fires towards the Euphrates valley in 2018.

From 2014 and the second Iraqi civil war, France actively participated in the international coalition against the Islamic State, by launching operation "Chammal" in support of the Iraqi army. About 3,200 men as well as several dozen combat aircraft, Dassault Rafale, Dassault Mirage 2000, Super-Étendard, as well as the aircraft carrier Charles de Gaulle and other frigates were mobilized in this external operation. Support was also provided by the French Army, notably special forces and CAESAR guns, during the battle of Mosul in 2016-2017.

In September 2020, French President Emmanuel Macron went to Iraq and met his counterpart, Iraqi President Barham Salih and his Prime Minister Mustafa Al-Kadhimi. The two heads of state evoked their security cooperation against the Islamic State, and a new project for the construction of a nuclear power plant under the control of the International Atomic Energy Agency, with many jobs at stake.

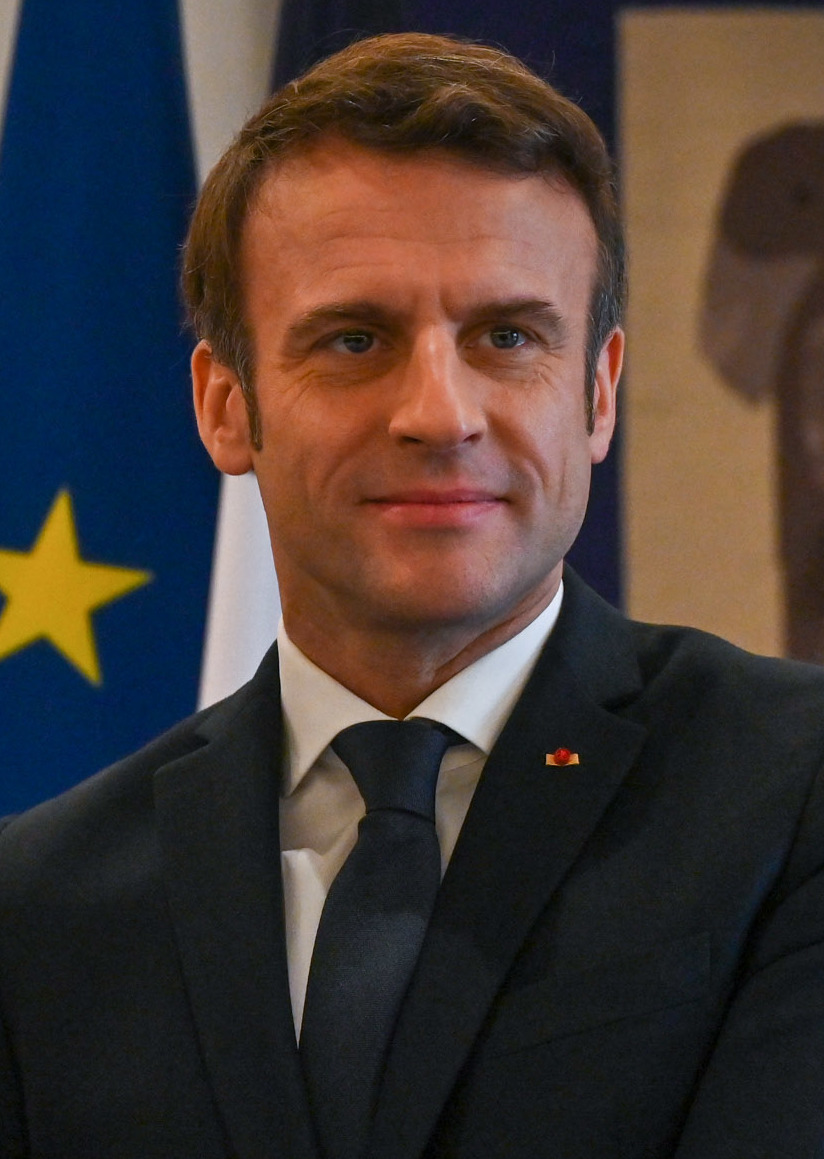
Emmanuel Macron

In August 2021, Emmanuel Macron went again to Iraq to participate in a regional summit in Baghdad devoted to the fight against terrorism following the taking of Kabul by the Taliban. France is the only country outside the Middle East to participate in this summit. The French president promised that the French army would remain and continue to support the Iraqi security forces. In the evening of the summit, he went to the Shiite shrine of Kadhimiya, in the company of Iraqi Prime Minister, Mustafa al-Kadhimi. The next day, the French head of state went to Mosul in a church and on the site of a mosque destroyed during the recapture of the city to the Islamic State group in 2017, in testimony of "respect towards all Iraqi communities". During a speech at the Our Lady of the Hour Church, Emmanuel Macron exhorted the Iraqis, tested by 40 years of conflicts and a social crisis, to "work together", before going to Erbil where he met the leaders of Iraqi Kurdistan.

A year later, in May 2022, Catherine Colonna, the new head of French diplomacy appointed by Emmanuel Macron after his reelection a month earlier, received in Paris the Iraqi Oil Minister Ihsan Ismail in search of new investments in the energy sector of his country. Ihsan Ismail also had talks with representatives of the French employers' union Medef and with the CEO of the French group TotalEnergies Patrick Pouyanné, while marking with Catherine Colonna the will of the two countries to "consolidate their relation". On the one hand, many French companies are established in Iraq, mainly in the fields of tourism, catering or health. Of numerous Lebanese go each year to Iraq, to the holy places of Najaf and the city of Karbala. The total volume of Lebanese exports to Iraq is however quite limited, rarely crossing the threshold of 150 million dollars per year, due to competition from Iran and Turkey and logistical costs that the two poor countries have to bear.

In December 2022, Emmanuel Macron went to Jordan for a new international summit dedicated to support for Iraq. He reaffirmed there: "France's attachment through its history, its diplomatic action for the stability of the region so that there is a way that is not that of a form of hegemony, imperialism, model that would be dictated from the outside".

The following month, Iraqi Prime Minister Mohammed Shia' Al Sudani went to Paris on official invitation from President Emmanuel Macron, to strengthen relations between "two friendly countries". Their meeting focused on energy and security issues, notably oil exploitations and the Iraqi electricity network, as well as arms trade, Iraq having since the Saddam Hussein era a fairly largely French military arsenal as well as an army trained and experienced in its use. The discussion of the two heads of state during a dinner at the Élysée Palace led to the signing of a "strategic partnership treaty" on which France commits notably to "extend the export credit facilities repayable for an amount of one billion euros, to support French companies operating in Iraq". Mohammed Shia' Al Sudani hailed relations engaged in "a strategic path thanks to the signing of a strategic partnership agreement", while the website of the Quai d’Orsay describes Franco-Iraqi relations as "particularly dynamic". The Iraqi Prime Minister also met during this visit to Paris representatives of the groups Thales, Dassault, and Airbus, to discuss a potential Iraqi acquisition of radars, Rafale or Eurocopter. At the end of March, in the continuity of the official visit to France of the Iraqi Prime Minister, the latter exchanged by telephone with Emmanuel Macron who reaffirmed to him France's support for the stability and sovereignty of Iraq. A month later, France opened a visa office in Mosul to facilitate applications from inhabitants wishing to travel, in particular students, academics, businessmen and tourists. In July 2023, French Minister of the Armed Forces Sébastien Lecornu went to Iraq to meet the French soldiers deployed there. He spoke in Baghdad with his counterpart, Iraqi Defense Minister Thabit al-Abbasi, as well as with Iraqi Prime Minister, Mohammed Shia' Al Sudani, to evoke the continuation of France's military and material support to the Iraqi army. In August, after the death of a French soldier engaged in Iraq alongside government forces against the Islamic State group, Emmanuel Macron spoke by telephone with Mohammed Shia' Al Sudani, and reiterated to him his determination to fight the jihadist group. The Iraqi Prime Minister thanked him and paid tribute to the French soldiers killed in operation in Iraq, of which about 600 were then still deployed in the country.

=== Relations with Germany ===
In the first half of the 20th century, Iraq experienced two brief rapprochements with Germany: in 1914, when the Ottoman Empire to which Iraq was still integrated signed with Germany the German–Ottoman alliance, then in 1941 when Prime Minister Rashid Ali al-Gaylani attempted to introduce Iraq into the camp of Nazi Germany. During the interwar period, the German chancelleries and consulates installed in Arab countries early understood the attachment of Arab peoples to independence, for which Nazi propaganda ingeniously fabricated the image of a sympathetic and benevolent Germany towards Arab peoples. Germany however had no political ambition in the Middle East, and essentially tried to extend its influence there to put pressure on the United Kingdom. But these two German-Iraqi rapprochements during the First and Second World War were followed by British military interventions (Mesopotamian campaign and Anglo-Iraqi War), which brought Iraq back into their sphere of influence. Germany which had just taken control of French Syria via the Vichy government favorable to it (established following the defeat of France in 1940) attempted to intervene in 1941, but the Luftwaffe arrived too late to prevent the British from landing.

During the Cold War, Germany was divided into two independent zones, the West Germany pro-Western and the East Germany pro-Soviet, each of which aligned its foreign policy with the bloc in which it was integrated.

During the Gulf War which took place the same year as the German reunification, Germany did not participate in the military operations of the coalition, but provided it with material and financial support. In 2003, Germany was part with France and Russia of the "Axis of Peace", opposed to an armed intervention against Iraq as long as all peaceful means to negotiate Saddam Hussein have not been exploited.

In 2015, during the second Iraqi civil war, Germany participated in the international coalition against the Islamic State by deploying 1,200 soldiers, six Panavia Tornado planes and a frigate, but its air forces did not carry out any bombing and confined themselves to reconnaissance missions. In October 2017, it was in Germany where he was hospitalized, that died the former Iraqi President Jalal Talabani in power from 2005 to 2014.

In January 2023, Iraqi Prime Minister Mohammed Shia' Al Sudani went to Berlin where he was received by German Chancellor Olaf Scholz. Their discussion focused on an energy agreement with the German company Siemens Energy to improve the Iraqi electricity sector in the field of production, transport and distribution, notably thanks to the valorization of the gas currently flared in oil exploitations in Iraq. The following month, Mohammed Shia' Al Sudani returned to Germany to participate in the Munich Security Conference.

=== Relations with Austria ===
In 1991, in the context of the Gulf War, Austria closed its embassy in Iraq and transferred its functions to its embassy in Jordan, allowing Vienna to maintain its relations with Baghdad.

In September 2023, Austrian Foreign Minister Alexander Schallenberg announced the official reopening of the Austrian embassy in Baghdad, during the opening ceremony in the Iraqi capital. About ten business leaders accompanied him, notably in the sectors of energy, health, telecommunications, but also infrastructure and transport, and declared themselves ready to invest in Iraq. According to the Austrian Federal Economic Chamber, Austrian exports to Iraq amounted to 94.5 million euros in 2022, an increase of 25% over one year.

=== Relations with Spain ===
In 2003, like the United Kingdom and Italy, Spain was part of the "Axis of War" accusing Iraq of possessing weapons of mass destruction in Iraq, and supported the international coalition sending troops to the country under the lead of the United States.

In 2014, Spain intervened again in Iraq under the lead of the United States, this time in support of the Iraqi government, and sent a thousand Italian soldiers to fight against the Islamic State. In December 2022, Italian head of state Giorgia Meloni went to Baghdad for her first bilateral visit outside Europe after her election to meet the troops there, on the occasion of the Christmas holidays. She was received there by her Iraqi counterpart Mohammed Shia' Al Sudani, who conveyed to her his desire to develop economic cooperation between their two countries in all fields, notably agriculture, water and health.

=== Relations with Vatican City ===
Until 2003, Iraq, a majority Shiite Muslim country, had one and a half million Christians. In December 1999, Pope John Paul II envisaged a trip to southern Iraq, but Saddam Hussein opposed it.

In October 2019, during the anti-government protests that shook Iraq, Pope Francis exhorted the Iraqi government to stop repressing its youth demanding justice. The Chaldean Catholic Church sided with the protesters, through the voice of Patriarch Louis-Raphaël Sako, whose position was implicitly endorsed by Pope Francis, when he appointed him cardinal of the Roman Church.

In January 2020, Pope Francis received at the Vatican Iraqi President Barham Salih, before announcing a year later, his intention to go to Iraq in March 2021. This first historic visit for a sovereign pontiff was welcomed with enthusiasm by Iraqi Foreign Minister Fuad Hussein who evoked a "message of peace for Iraq and for the whole region".

On 5 March, Pope Francis landed in Baghdad, marking the first visit of a sovereign pontiff to Iraq, but also his first international trip for fifteen months due to the COVID-19 pandemic. Upon his arrival, he delivered a speech at the Presidential Palace, in which he called on leaders to defend a peaceful society and peaceful coexistence in a country eaten away by ethnic and religious divisions

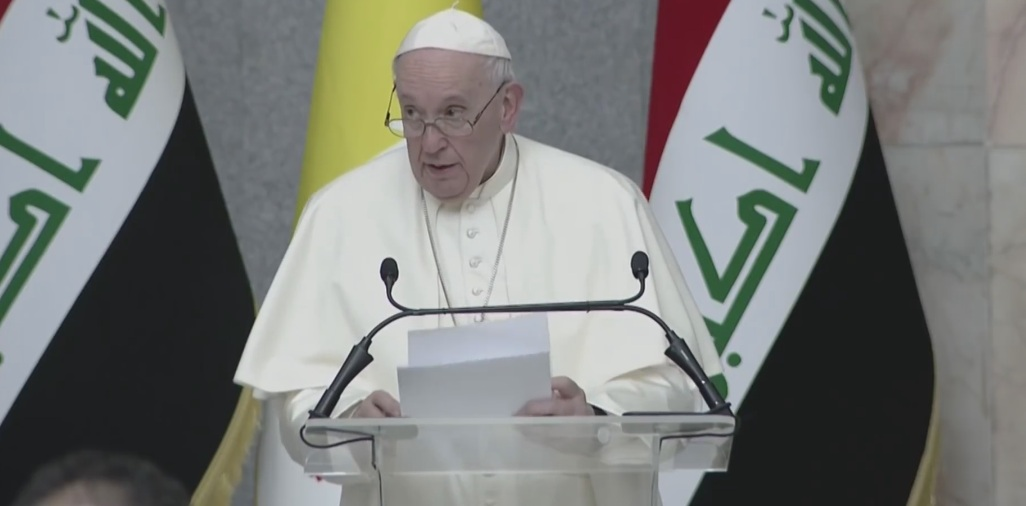
Speech by Pope Francis at the Presidential Palace in Baghdad on 5 March 2021.

He celebrated a first mass at the Sayidat al-Nejat Cathedral, where he paid tribute to persecuted Christians and Yazidis, as well as to the victims of the Islamist attack that hit this cathedral in October 2010. The pope recalled the very ancient presence of Christians in Iraq where according to tradition Abraham was born, calling on them to remain in Iraq by pleading for "their participation in public life as citizens fully enjoying rights, freedom and responsibility". The same day, the pope met President Barham Salih, who saluted a guest appreciated by Iraqis, and declared "One cannot imagine a Middle East without Christians".

The next day, the pope went to the holy city of Najaf, where he met with the Shiite ayatollah Ali al-Sistani, who conveyed to him "the attention he pays to the fact that Christian citizens live like all Iraqis in peace and security, strong in all their constitutional rights".

After this meeting, the pope went to Ur, birthplace of Abraham, to pray with Yazidi dignitaries, but also Sabians or Zoroastrians, as well as Muslims, Shiites and Sunnis. While paying tribute again to Iraqi victims of the Islamic State, he pleaded for the need to "walk from conflict to unity throughout the Middle East and particularly in martyred Syria".

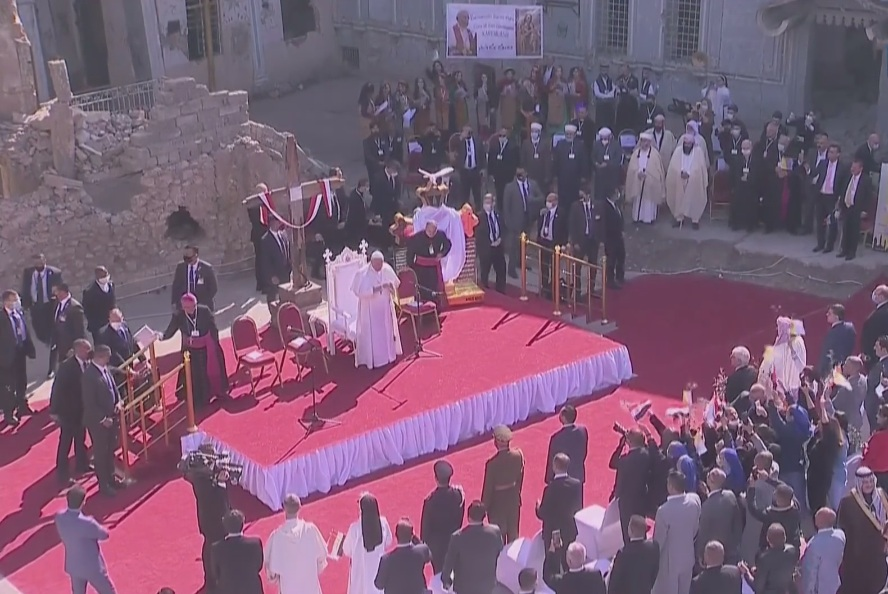
Mass by Pope Francis in the streets of Mosul on 7 March 2021.

Sunday 7 March 2021, the pope went to Mosul, former "capital" of the Islamic State in Iraq where he prayed on a platform built in the middle of the ruins for the victims of the war, then celebrated a mass in the just restored church of the neighboring Christian city of Qaraqosh (halfway between Mosul and Erbil), where the sovereign pontiff called on the crowd to "rebuild" and "not to be discouraged". He concluded his visit to Iraq the same day with a mass on the lawn of the Franso Hariri Stadium (name of an assassinated Christian politician), of Erbil capital of Iraqi Kurdistan in the presence of thousands of faithful, calling on Christians still in the country not to be discouraged. The pope declared there also "Iraq will always remain with me". The Vatican ambassador to Baghdad is the Italian diplomat and Apostolic Nuncio Mitja Leskovar.

In November 2021, two days after a drone assassination attempt against Iraqi Prime Minister Mustafa al-Kadhimi, the pope condemned in a communiqué from the Holy See an "odious act of terrorism" and "prays that the Iraqi people receive wisdom and strength to continue on the path of peace, through dialogue and fraternal solidarity".

=== Relations with Sweden ===
Sweden did not intervene in any of the wars waged by Iraq (or in Iraq) between 1980 and 2003, with the exception of limited humanitarian support, but provided military aid to the Iraqi government in its war against the Islamic State in 2015. Swedish military instructors were sent to Iraq to train Iraqi troops, while Sweden hosted a large number of Iraqi refugees, making Iraqis the second largest foreign-origin population in Sweden, with nearly 150,000 citizens in 2022.

In July 2023, an Iraqi refugee in Sweden publicly degraded a Quran in front of the Iraqi embassy in Stockholm, provoking important demonstrations in Iraq, the protesters reproaching the Swedish authorities for having authorized the gesture of this Iraqi refugee. These degenerated when supporters of the Shiite cleric Muqtada al-Sadr set fire to a building of the Swedish embassy in Baghdad, but this attack was condemned as much by the Swedish authorities as by their Iraqi counterparts, who announced to bring to justice the authors of this fire. Sweden nevertheless summoned the Iraqi chargé d'affaires to convey its protests, while Iraq ordered Thursday the expulsion of the Swedish ambassador in Baghdad. But this diplomatic crisis was judged without gravity by researcher Massaab al-Aloosy, who considered that the Iraqi retaliatory measures are more measures of domestic policy intended to calm the anger of the population, than measures of foreign policy. As for the Iraqi refugee author of this "book burning", he could have done this gesture out of opportunism, in order to voluntarily put himself in danger if he was sent back to Iraq, and thus obtain the acceptance of his request for permanent residence in Sweden. In addition, trade between Iraq and Sweden is limited, so there will be no consequences on the economic level such as risks of boycott.

In July 2024, three Swedes residing in Iraq were sentenced to death by an Iraqi court, accused of having participated in a shooting. In reaction, Stockholm summoned the Iraqi chargé d'affaires to convey its opposition to these decisions and to demand that these sentences not be executed.

== Relations with the African continent ==
=== Relations with Egypt ===
Iraq and Egypt are both members and co-founders of the Arab League, and of the Organisation of Islamic Cooperation. These two countries were the main Arab actors in the 1948 Arab–Israeli War, while Iraq participated in the Egyptian offensives of 1967 and 1973 against Israel. In February 1958, it was in reaction to the merger of Egypt and Syria into the United Arab Republic a week earlier, that Iraq and Jordan united in turn in the Arab Federation of Iraq and Jordan. Egyptian President Nasser, magnanimous, sent a message of congratulations to the two sovereigns who united their kingdoms, but the rivalry between the two federations was blatant, the first being pan-Arab, anti-colonial and socialist, the second being monarchical and pro-Western.

In July 1958, the Iraqi revolution that overthrew the pro-British monarchy was carried out with the support of Egypt, which had itself driven the British from its territory two years earlier. But quickly, tensions appeared in the new Iraqi government, between nationalists favorable to Iraq's independence, and Nasserists favorable to its attachment to the United Arab Republic. In December 1958, Abdul Salam Arif (Nasserist) was arrested and imprisoned on the order of the Prime Minister, his former brother in arms Abd al-Karim Qasim, provoking tensions with Nasser who at the same time, opposed the project of annexation of Kuwait by Iraq. This did not prevent Nasser from condemning at the same time the deployment of British forces in the small Emirate, of which he demanded withdrawal and had them replaced by a multinational Arab force.

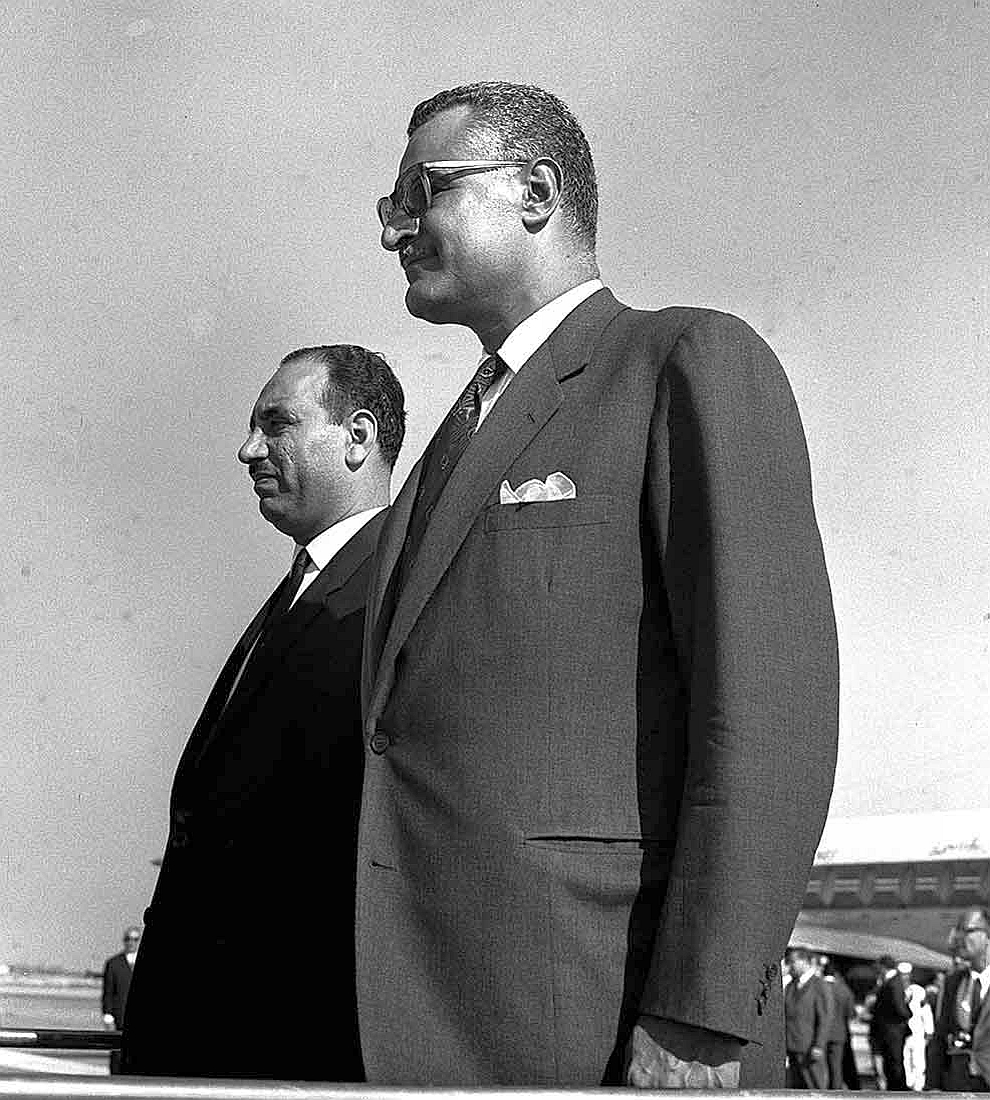
Iraqi President Abdul Salam Arif with Gamal Abdel Nasser in Alexandria in 1963.

In February 1963 Prime Minister Abd al-Karim Qasim was in turn overthrown and executed following a coup d'état by the Ba'ath Party, which placed his rival Abdul Salam Arif in the presidency of Iraq. He was received by Nasser in Alexandria in August 1963. But the affinity between the two heads of state did not long mark the common history of the two countries: Abdul Salam Arif died in a helicopter accident in April 1966 (his brother Abdul Rahman Arif succeeded him, but remained in power only for two years), and Gamal Abdel Nasser was carried away by a heart attack in September 1970.

Iraq and Egypt broke their relations in December 1977, following Iraq's opposition to the peace initiatives of Egyptian President Anwar Sadat with Israel. In 1978, Baghdad hosted an Arab League summit that condemned and sidelined Egypt for having accepted the Camp David Accords. However, Egypt's material and diplomatic support to Iraq in its war with Iran led to warmer relations and numerous contacts between high officials, despite the continued absence of representation at the ambassador level.

In January 1984, three years after the assassination of Anwar Sadat, Iraq successfully led Arab efforts within the Organisation of Islamic Cooperation to restore Egypt's membership, formalized in 1989. However, Iraqi-Egyptian relations were broken again in 1990 when Egypt joined the United Nations coalition during the Gulf War, which forced the Iraqi army to leave Kuwait.

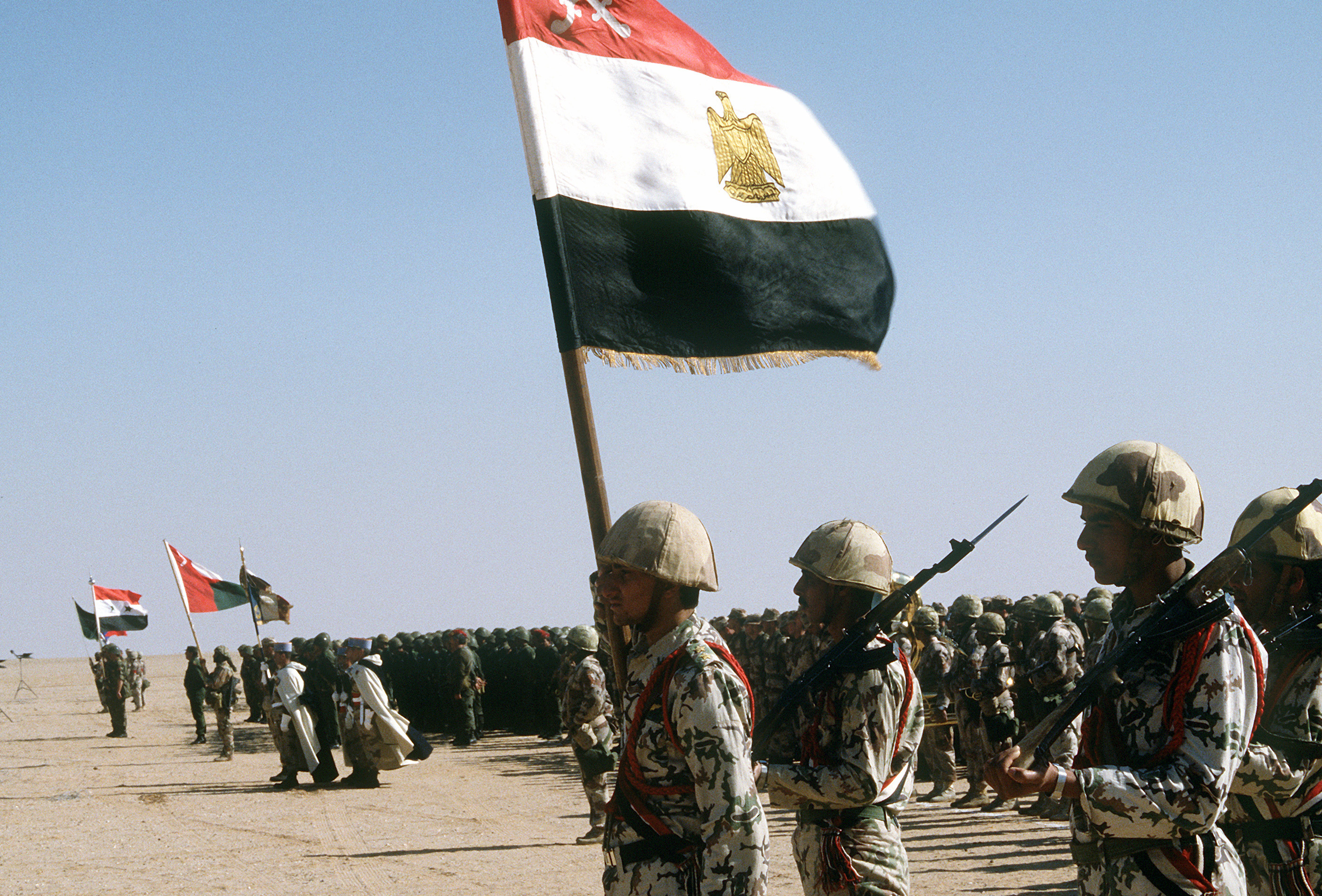
Egyptian forces in Iraq after the victory, on 8 March 1991.

In 2003, Egyptian President Hosni Mubarak supported the US invasion of Iraq, triggering major protest movements and a sharp drop in his popularity in Egypt. Diplomatic relations between the two states resumed after the overthrow of Saddam Hussein, and Egypt became one of Iraq's main trading partners. But these were broken again for four years from July 2005, following the kidnapping and murder in Baghdad of the Egyptian chargé d'affaires, Ihab al-Sharif claimed by Al-Qaeda, before being re-established in June 2009.

Since 2013, Egypt and Iraq have both been engaged in the fight against Islamist insurgencies on their respective territories, and each benefit from substantial US aid to maintain peace and stability on their territory. Egypt broke its diplomatic relations with Iraq's three main bordering neighbors: Iran in 1979, Syria in June 2013, and Turkey in November 2013. In 2016 however, Egyptian President in power since 2014 Abdel Fattah el-Sisi took the opposite stance of his predecessor Mohamed Morsi by declaring his support for Syrian President Bashar al-Assad and Iraqi Prime Minister Haider al-Abadi in their fights against "terrorism and radical Islamism". In the following years, diplomatic relations between Baghdad and Cairo improved with numerous high officials from the two countries making cross visits.

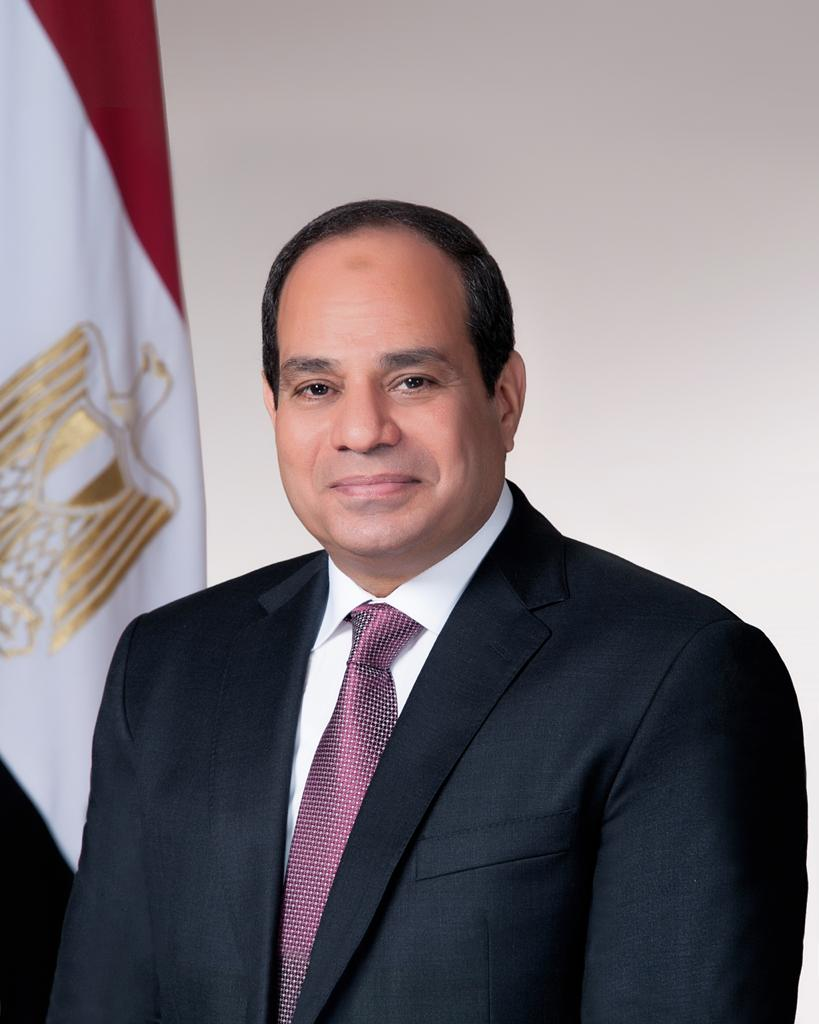
Abdel Fattah el-Sisi, Egyptian president since 2014

On 27 June 2021, President Abdel Fattah el-Sisi went to Baghdad, becoming the first Egyptian head of state to go to Iraq since the break in diplomatic relations between the two countries in 1990. He met Iraqi Prime Minister Mustafa Al-Kadhimi and King Abdallah II of Jordan in the framework of a tripartite summit between their three countries, focusing on political and economic cooperation, investments, and the fight against terrorism. This meeting was motivated by the observation that an alliance between Egypt which has significant military capabilities, Iraq which has considerable oil resources and Jordan rich in its human capital is promising if these countries capitalize on their complementarity. Several cooperation agreements were signed in the sectors of energy, health and education. Abdel Fattah el-Sisi, Mustafa Al-Kadhimi and King Abdallah II met again in Baghdad in August 2021 during an expanded Middle East summit including France, focused on security and regional economic development.

In addition to better economic cooperation, this Cairo-Baghdad-Amman axis was also motivated by shared geopolitical interests by the three countries: to counterbalance the influence of Iran, Turkey and the pro-American Gulf monarchies (mainly Saudi Arabia) in regional affairs. Indeed, these three countries have in common the desire to regain regional influence after having been sidelined by Donald Trump's policy in the Middle East, ultra-favorable to Israel, Turkey (via NATO and the friendly relations between Trump and Erdogan) and the Gulf monarchies.

In December 2022, Egyptian President Abdel Fattah el-Sisi participated in the second Baghdad conference in Jordan, and affirmed "Egypt's refusal of any external intervention in Iraq".

=== Relations with Libya ===
Iraq and Libya are both members of the Arab League (Libya was the first non-founding country to join in 1953), of the Organisation of Islamic Cooperation, and of the Organization of the Petroleum Exporting Countries. If these two countries had few direct interactions, they shared a common history, notably in their respective independences obtained by the overthrow of pro-British monarchies (in 1958 for Iraq and 1969 for Libya), and their adherence to Pan-Arabism and Nasserism during their "post-colonial" years. The Libyan officer Muammar Gaddafi, author of the military coup that overthrew King Idris I, considered himself a disciple then heir of Nasser, who died a year after his takeover. He moreover resumed like Abd al-Karim Qasim, instigator of the Iraqi revolution, the name "free officers" to designate his putschist soldiers, in homage to Nasser.

But this pan-Arabist turn in Libya came after a nationalist turn in Iraq (following the coup d'état by the Ba'ath Party in 1968), which meant that Baghdad and Tripoli ultimately had little affinity in their foreign policies, apart from their membership in the "Non-Aligned Movement". The two countries were also very hostile to Israel, and both condemned the Israeli-Egyptian peace accords of 1978 by excluding Egypt from the Arab League, and by breaking their diplomatic relations with Cairo.

In the following years, while Muammar Gaddafi's hostility towards his Egyptian counterpart radicalized, Saddam Hussein played appeasement, recognizing Egypt's support in its war against Iran. In addition to this diplomatic divergence, the two countries found themselves indirectly enemies in the Chadian–Libyan conflict (from 1978 to 1987), and in the Iran–Iraq War (1980-1988), during which the two Arab leaders, simultaneously at war, supported each other's enemies.

In 1990, nevertheless, in opposition to "American imperialism", Gaddafi's Libya was the only country, with Iraq, to oppose an Arab League resolution demanding the withdrawal of Iraqi troops from Kuwait. After the Gulf War, Libya (which did not participate in it), was like Iraq, subjected to United Nations economic sanctions due to Muammar Gaddafi's refusal to extradite those responsible for the Lockerbie bombing. These were lifted in 2003 following the overthrow of Saddam Hussein, which pushed Muammar Gaddafi, fearing for his own survival, to yield to Western pressure. He was in turn overthrown and killed in 2011 during a popular uprising supported by a military intervention (essentially aerial unlike the Iraq war) by NATO.

The "historical similarities" between Iraq and Libya continued in the following years, when the two countries faced two successive civil wars, the second of which allowed the Islamic State group to take several cities in their respective territories (Derna and Sirte in Libya). From then on, "international" units of the Islamic State such as the Katibat al-Battar participated simultaneously or successively in several battles on the Iraqi fronts (Battle of Baiji), Libyan (Battle of Derna), and Syrian (Battle of Deir ez-Zor (2014–2017)), which ended in defeats for the jihadist group, despite heavy losses caused to the opposing armies. Iraq and Libya, both supported by the US army, managed between 2016 and 2017 to drive the jihadist group from their territories, and took a pro-Western diplomatic turn.

=== Relations with Algeria ===
Algeria is like Iraq a member of the Organization of the Petroleum Exporting Countries, of the Arab League, and of the Organisation of Islamic Cooperation. In 1956, Iraq, in solidarity with Algeria in the war of independence against France (between 1954 and 1962) broke its diplomatic relations with France, then re-established them in January 1963 after the Évian Accords formalizing the independence of Algeria. Algeria and Iraq fought in the same Arab coalition against Israel during the Yom Kippur War in 1973, while being allies during the Six-Day War in 1967, but their participation in this conflict was minimal due to its brevity.

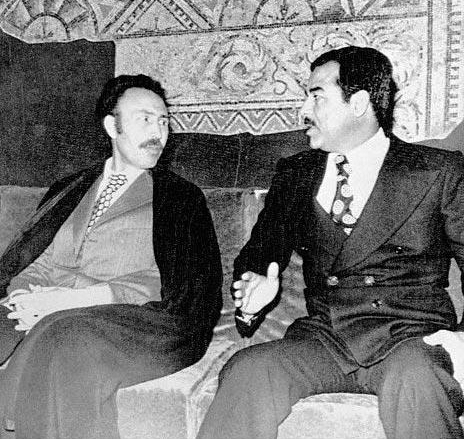
Algerian and Iraqi heads of state Houari Boumédiène and Saddam Hussein in Algiers in 1975.

One year after the Yom Kippur War, in March 1975, Saddam Hussein went to Algiers to meet the Shah of Iran Mohammad Reza Pahlavi in the presence of Algerian President Houari Boumédiène, to formalize an agreement on the tracing of the border between Iraq and Iran. But Saddam Hussein decided to go back on these agreements in September 1980 when he attacked Iran one year after the regime change. The Algerian government tried again to position itself as a mediator, and in 1982 sent a delegation of high Algerian officials, including Algerian Foreign Minister Mohammed Seddik Benyahia to meet the Iranian government in Tehran. But their plane was shot down, probably by mistake, by the Iraqi Air Force over the Turkish-Iranian border, causing the death of all passengers.

In 1990, during the Gulf War, Algeria did not participate in the international military coalition (unlike its neighbor Morocco), while Saddam Hussein's posture as the "Arab hero defying the United States" found a favorable echo in the Algerian population. In July 2001, while Iraq was still under embargo, an Algerian delegation went to Baghdad, where contracts totaling 67 million dollars were signed, notably on pharmaceutical cooperation projects, oil exploitation and the delivery to Iraq of heavy vehicles.

In September 2018, a football match between two Algerian and Iraqi clubs in Bologhine provoked a diplomatic crisis between the two states, after Algerian supporters chanted slogans favorable to Saddam Hussein. In reaction, the spokesperson for the Iraqi Ministry of Foreign Affairs, Ahmed Mahjoub expressed "the indignation of the Iraqi government and people" and denounced a "glorification of the horrible face of Saddam Hussein's murderous dictatorial regime".

=== Relations with Morocco ===
Morocco is like Iraq a member of the Arab League, and of the Organisation of Islamic Cooperation. Morocco did not participate in the first 1948 Arab–Israeli War, obtaining its independence from France only in 1956, nor in the Six-Day War of 1967 during which King Hassan II, then in conflict with his counterparts in the Arab League, was even suspected of having provided intelligence to Israel. Moroccan ground troops were however deployed within the Arab coalition during the Yom Kippur War, part of which was incorporated into Syrian units, the other deployed on the Sinai front (but arrived too late to participate in the fighting). In total, 5,500 Moroccans were mobilized in support of the Arab offensive against Israel, which lasted between 6 October 1973 and 25 October 1973.

In 1990, Morocco distinguished itself as one of the Arab countries that sent a contingent to Kuwait alongside the Westerners during the Gulf War, despite strong disapproval from the Moroccan population. This participation of the Moroccan army in the war against Iraq provoked a general strike in December 1990, followed in February 1991 by demonstrations gathering more than 300,000 people in Rabat.

In 2016, Morocco participated in the international coalition in support of the Iraqi government against the Islamic State organization by sending several F-16 and pilots, placed under Emirati command. But divergences between Baghdad and Rabat appeared after the end of the war: in May 2018, Rabat broke its diplomatic relations with Tehran, Iraq's essential partner in the region, then normalized its relations with Israel, its sworn enemy in December 2020.

Two years later, despite these divergences in their strategic interests, the two states drew closer during a visit to the Iraqi capital by the head of Moroccan Diplomacy Nasser Bourita in January 2023. Received by his Iraqi counterpart Fuad Hussein, he announced the reopening of the Moroccan embassy in Baghdad, closed and transferred to Jordan in 2005 for security reasons. The head of Iraqi diplomacy evoked the beginning of a "new era" in Iraqi-Moroccan relations, declared his desire to encourage "commercial and economic cooperation in all fields", and brought Iraq's support for "the territorial unity of the Kingdom of Morocco and the UN efforts to reach a final solution concerning the issue of Western Sahara".

=== Relations with Sudan ===
Sudan is like Iraq a member of the Arab League, and of the Organisation of Islamic Cooperation.

Sudanese volunteers joined the Arab coalition and fought alongside the Iraqi army during the 1948 Arab–Israeli War, while Sudan mobilized its army in 1967 during the Six-Day War, but did not have time to intervene because of the brevity of the conflict. The same year, Khartoum hosted an Arab League summit where the "three no's" were proclaimed: "No peace with Israel, no recognition of Israel, no negotiation with Israel".

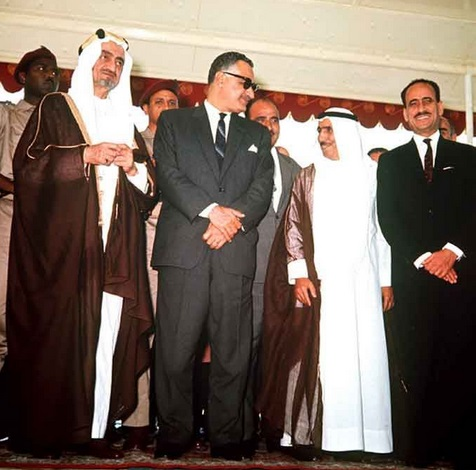
1967 Arab League summit in Khartoum. From left to right: King Faisal of Saudi Arabia, Egyptian President Nasser, Emir Sabah III of Kuwait, and Iraqi President Abdul Rahman Arif.

During the Iran–Iraq War, Sudanese President Jaafar Nimeiry was one of the rare heads of state to support Saddam Hussein by sending fighters as reinforcements, while most of Iraq's allies were content with material and financial aid. The Sudanese reinforcements however intervened only in a defensive role, when Iraq was the target of large Iranian counter-offensives from 1982. During the Iraqi invasion of Kuwait in 1990 Sudan directed by the Islamist regime of Omar al-Bashir (who came to power a year earlier) was one of the only countries in the world to express its support for Saddam Hussein. In reaction, Saudi Arabia, one of its main funders, decided to cancel its financial aid granted to Sudan, depriving the country of an essential source of revenue.

The affinities between the two states were however quite limited and essentially held to their common animosity towards the United States and Israel, which at the same time, supported the rebellion during the Second Sudanese Civil War. But this situation changed in 2016 when Sudan broke its diplomatic relations with Iran, Iraq's main partner, then in 2020 when the new Sudanese government put in place after the revolution of 2018-2019 normalized its relations with Israel.

=== Relations with Chad ===
Chad is like Iraq a member of the Organisation of Islamic Cooperation, whose secretary general has been since 2020 the Chadian diplomat Hissein Brahim Taha. During the Chadian–Libyan conflict which lasted from 1978 to 1987, Saddam Hussein's Iraq, although already at war with Iran, provided military support to Chad directed by Hissène Habré.

=== Relations with Eritrea ===
Eritrea has been an observer state of the Arab League since 2003. That year, as the American army prepared the Iraq War and sought bases in this region to station its troops, Eritrean President Isaias Afwerki tried to take advantage of the occasion to get closer to the United States by offering them to host an American naval base on its coastline on the Red Sea. But this offer was refused by Washington.

=== Relations with Mauritania ===
In 1990-1991, Mauritanian President Maaouya Ould Sid'Ahmed Taya gave his support to Saddam Hussein's regime during the Gulf War.

=== Relations with Uganda ===
In 2003, Uganda was one of the rare African countries to support the invasion of Iraq by American troops. Thousands of Ugandans participated in the Iraq War as security agents, where the United States had strategic installations.

== Relations with Asia-Pacific ==
During the Cold War, one of Saddam Hussein's favorite themes was the need to promote the emergence of new centers of power in the world, capable of replacing the monopoly of the two superpowers, notably Europe, but also Japan, China.

=== Relations with China ===
During the Iran–Iraq War, China provided support to Iraq through arms deliveries, but also to a lesser extent to Iran, benefiting from its market left free by its diplomatic isolation. Since the overthrow of Saddam Hussein, China and Iraq have maintained strong economic relations, with China being a very important market for Iraq's oil exports. In 2013, half of Iraqi production (1.5 million barrels per day) was bought by Chinese companies. Chinese oil companies such as PetroChina and China National Petroleum Corporation have significant investments in Iraq, where PetroChina holds a 25% stake in West Qurna 1, one of the country's largest fields with 43 billion barrels. PetroChina also operates the Halfaya oil field alongside the French TotalEnergies and the Malaysian Petronas.

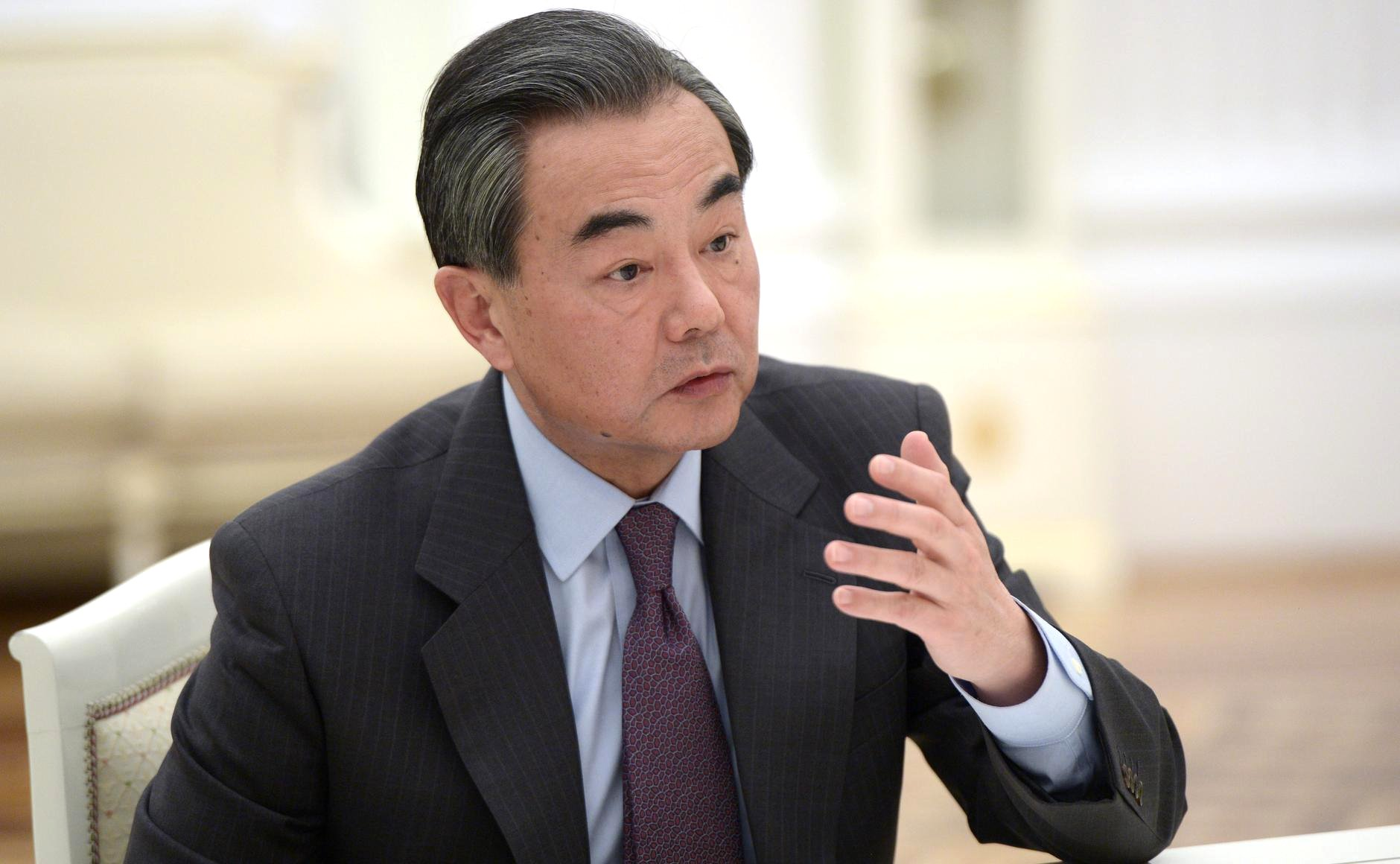
Wang Yi, Minister of Foreign Affairs of the People's Republic of China since 2013.

In February 2014, the visit to Baghdad by Chinese Foreign Minister Wang Yi was the first visit to Iraq by a high-ranking Chinese official since the fall of Saddam Hussein. During their meeting, his Iraqi counterpart Hoshyar Zebari hailed China as "Iraq's largest trading partner, and the largest investor in the oil and electricity sectors".

In 2019, China signed with Iraq an agreement called "Oil for construction" providing for Chinese construction projects in Iraq in exchange for the sale to China of 100,000 barrels of Iraqi oil per day. Under this agreement, in December 2021, the Iraqi government signed agreements with two Chinese companies, Power China and Sinotech, for the construction of a thousand schools in Baghdad and the rest of the country within two years. The bill is to be paid with oil, according to Hassan Mejaham, an official from the Ministry of Construction and Housing, who stated that the country needs 8,000 additional establishments to educate nearly 3.2 million Iraqi children of school age who are not in school. At the same time, China became the first customer for Iraqi oil, importing more than 350,000 barrels per day from Iraq, while Sino-Iraqi trade exceeded 30 billion dollars per year.

In December 2022, Iraqi Prime Minister Mohammed Shia' Al Sudani represented his country at a China-Arab summit organized in Saudi Arabia, where he met Chinese President Xi Jinping.

=== Relations with Japan ===
In 2003, although close to the United States, Japan was reluctant to support the American intervention in Iraq due to strong opposition from its public opinion (more than 80%). Under the influence of the United States, Japan accepted limited involvement in the conflict, starting with financial aid, humanitarian missions, then the deployment of about 600 soldiers from December 2003. This commitment, although very limited, constituted a historic turnaround on the part of Japan, which had not participated in any war since its demilitarization imposed by the United States after its surrender in World War II. The following year, Japan took the presidency of the "Friends of Iraq" group created by the UN to organize international support for the political transition in Iraq, having paid the largest financial contribution for the reconstruction of the country (450 million dollars).

Between 2014 and 2018, Japan was represented in Iraq by Fumio Iwai, an ambassador with an atypical personality, who enjoyed strong popularity among the Iraqi population during his mandate. His notoriety resulted from regular publications of short videos on social networks, in which he addressed the population in Arabic and local dialects, on popular subjects like football and Iraqi gastronomy. He notably appeared in the jersey of the Iraqi football team during the 2018 FIFA World Cup.

=== Relations with North Korea ===
Formal relations between the two countries were established in 1968 after Saddam Hussein came to power in Iraq. They were initially marked by a cordial understanding before being broken in 1980 due to North Korea's support for Iran during the Iran–Iraq War.

Despite this, new negotiations were undertaken in 1999, establishing bilateral cooperation until 2002. North Korea reportedly supplied Scud missiles to Iraq, two dozen, while the Iraqi ballistic program had been largely neutralized during the Gulf War in 1991.

In 2003, the American invasion of Iraq followed by the overthrow of Saddam Hussein convinced North Korea of the need to possess nuclear weapons, as it was also located in the "Axis of Evil" by George W. Bush. On 21 September 2012, in the context of the Syrian civil war, Iraq refused a North Korean plane transporting weapons destined for the Syrian army to pass through its airspace.

=== Relations with South Korea ===
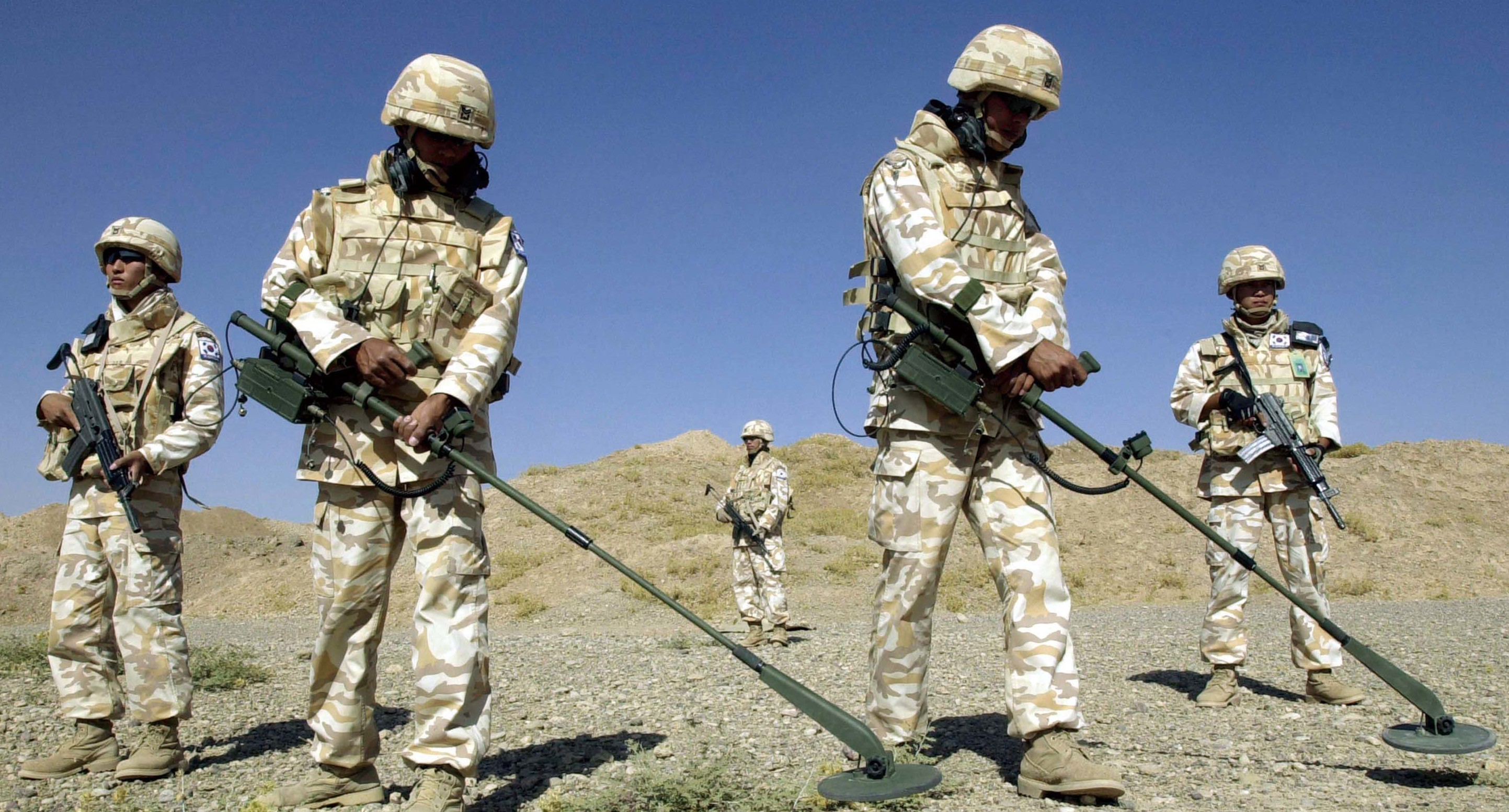
South Korean soldiers during a demining mission in Iraq in 2004.

In 1990 and 2004, South Korea, the most pro-American country in Asia along with Japan, participated in the international coalition engaged in Iraq during the Gulf War, then in the Anglo-American coalition that invaded Iraq in 2003. While its participation in the Gulf War was very modest and symbolic, the South Korean army deployed 3,600 soldiers in Iraq in 2004, making it the largest contingent after those of the United States and Great Britain. South Korean troops withdrew from the country in December 2008.

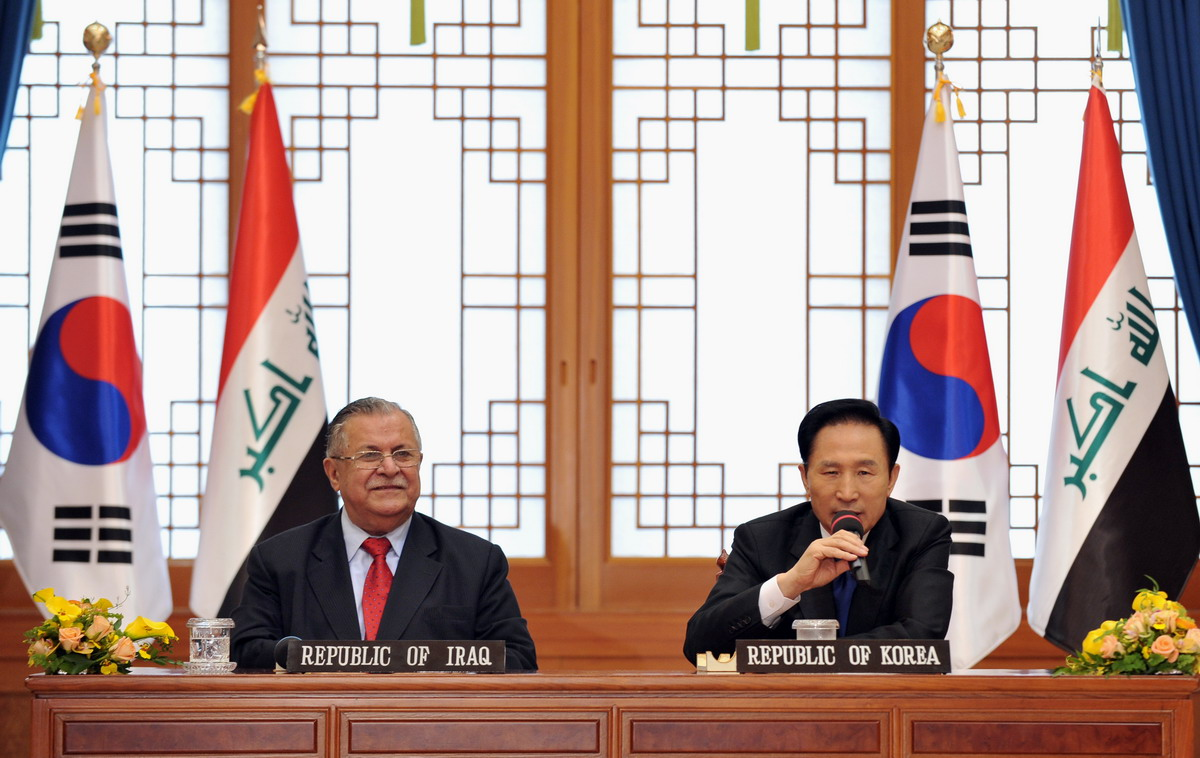
Iraqi President Jalal Talabani and his South Korean counterpart Lee Myung-bak in Seoul in 2009.

Two months later, in February 2009, Iraqi President Jalal Talabani traveled to Seoul where he met his South Korean counterpart Lee Myung-bak. The two heads of state signed a $3.55 billion agreement to develop oil fields in the Basra region and carry out infrastructure work. In addition, a $31 million agreement was signed between the manager of Incheon International Airport and the Kurdistan government to export equipment to airports in that region. The following year, the South Korean company Korea Gas Corporation became the main operator of the Akkas gas field in western Iraq, but was forced to evacuate it four years later following the invasion by the Islamic State group in Iraq in Al-Anbar Governorate.

In 2023, the South Korean conglomerate Hyundai was solicited to build a fourth refinery in Iraq in the city of Karbala in the center of the country.

=== Relations with Sri Lanka ===
A village in Sri Lanka bears the name of Saddam Hussein, the former Iraqi head of state, who financed its construction (housing and infrastructure) in 1978: the village of Saddam Hussein Nagar.

== Position in the Middle East since 2003 ==
Although located on several fault lines between Syria to the west and Iran to the east, Iraq has been relatively spared from regional conflicts since 2003.

=== United States and Iran influences ===
In 2003, although Iran had been designated as part of the "Axis of Evil" by George W. Bush, the United States and Iran were objective allies against Saddam Hussein, responsible for the last major conflict imposed on Iran between 1980 and 1988. The overthrow of Saddam Hussein in 2003 replaced a single-party regime with a governance system based on confessional distribution according to quotas, in which Iran and the United States exercised strong influence. In the following years, this particular situation made Iraq a "sanctuary" where the two powers avoided confronting each other, although enemies on the international scene. In 2014, Prime Minister Haider al-Abadi was appointed after a tacit agreement between Washington and Tehran, who during the second Iraqi civil war, supported on different fronts the pro-government camp against the Islamic State group. In October 2018, he was overthrown by the Iraqi parliament after being ordered by Washington to apply the American embargo imposed on Iran.

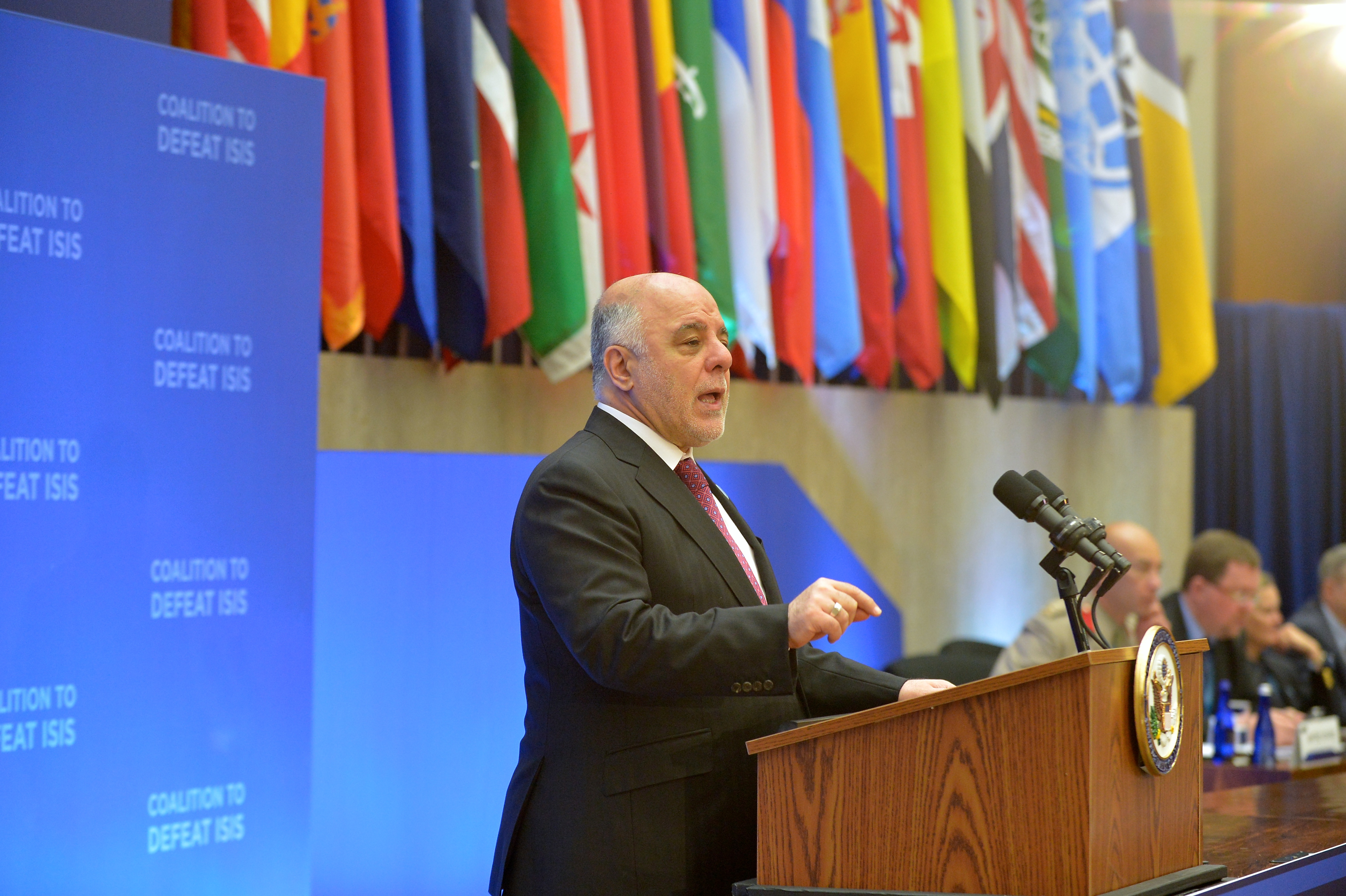
Haider al-Abadi, Iraqi Prime Minister from 2014 to 2018, at a summit of the international coalition against the Islamic State.

After the defeat of the Islamic State in Iraq in December 2017, the United States and Iran maintained a certain convergence of their interests in Iraq, which they wished to keep stable and under control. While a stable Iraq was vital as an export market for Tehran whose economy suffered from American sanctions, Washington wanted to keep the threat of the Islamic State group away. At the same time, maintaining a politically and economically weak Iraqi state also benefited the two powers who imposed their influence by benefiting from a favorable balance of power. In this context, Iraq found itself at the end of the 2010s at the center of contradictory injunctions, ordered by the United States to respect the American embargo imposed on Iran, while its dependence on its border neighbor was total to rebuild the country and its economy. Furthermore, complying with such an injunction would run the risk for the Iraqi government of being overthrown by the parliament in which the deputies of the "Al-Binaa" bloc favorable to Iran were in the majority, and provoke new clashes in the street, the latter still largely influenced by pro-Iranian militias.

The year 2020 opened with a flare-up of violence between American and Iranian forces deployed in Iraq following the murder of an American army subcontractor whose responsibility was attributed to pro-Iranian militias. Twenty-five pro-Iran fighters were killed in a series of airstrikes carried out in retaliation by the United States on 29 December 2019, while a new American strike in the night from January 2, 2020 to January 3, 2020 caused the death of Iranian General Qasem Soleimani and the head of Iraqi Hezbollah, Abu Mahdi al-Muhandis.

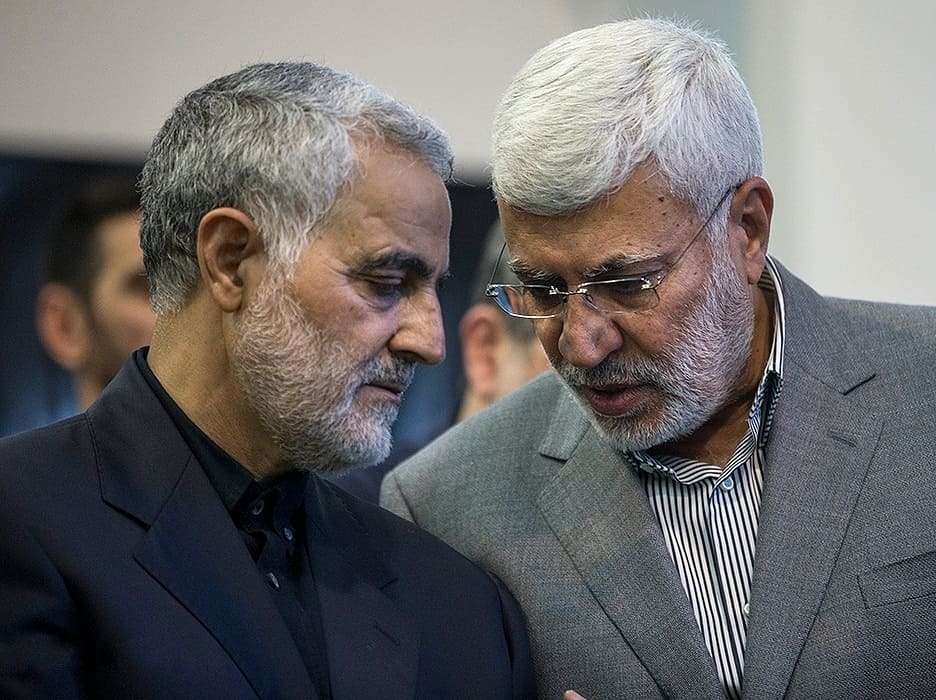
Abu Mahdi al-Muhandis and Qasem Soleimani, killed in Baghdad by an American strike in January 2020.

Iran retaliated by firing several missiles in the night from 7 January 2020 to 8 January 2020 on Iraqi bases housing American soldiers, without causing casualties in the targeted military bases, but accidentally shot down Ukraine International Airlines Flight 752 connecting Tehran to Kyiv, which crashed causing the death of 176 people.

The next day, while the circumstances of the crash were not yet known, the two countries played appeasement and confirmed that neither wished to engage in an open conflict. On 11 January 2020, Iran presented its apologies for the air accident, while emphasizing the responsibility of "American adventurism" in this disaster. On 22 January 2020, Iraqi President Barham Salih stated at the World Economic Forum in Davos, his country's refusal to take sides between Iran and the United States, while calling on the two states to respect the sovereignty and independence of Iraq. A year later, an Iraqi court issued an arrest warrant against American President Donald Trump as part of the investigation into the elimination of Abu Mahdi al-Muhandis.

But in the meantime, in May 2020, the arrival of Mustafa al-Kadhimi to the post of Iraqi Prime Minister allowed tensions to subside. Pro-American, he made his first trip to Tehran a month after taking office, before receiving Mohammad Javad Zarif in Baghdad a week later, in order to reassure about his intentions to preserve economic and commercial relations between Iran and Iraq. Paradoxically, his closeness to Washington was favorably perceived by the Iranian government, which hoped to use him as a mediator to negotiate with the American administration and convince it to ease its economic pressure on Iran. Iraq had everything to gain by playing on both tables, being both dependent on American investments and Iranian imports for reconstruction following the second civil war.

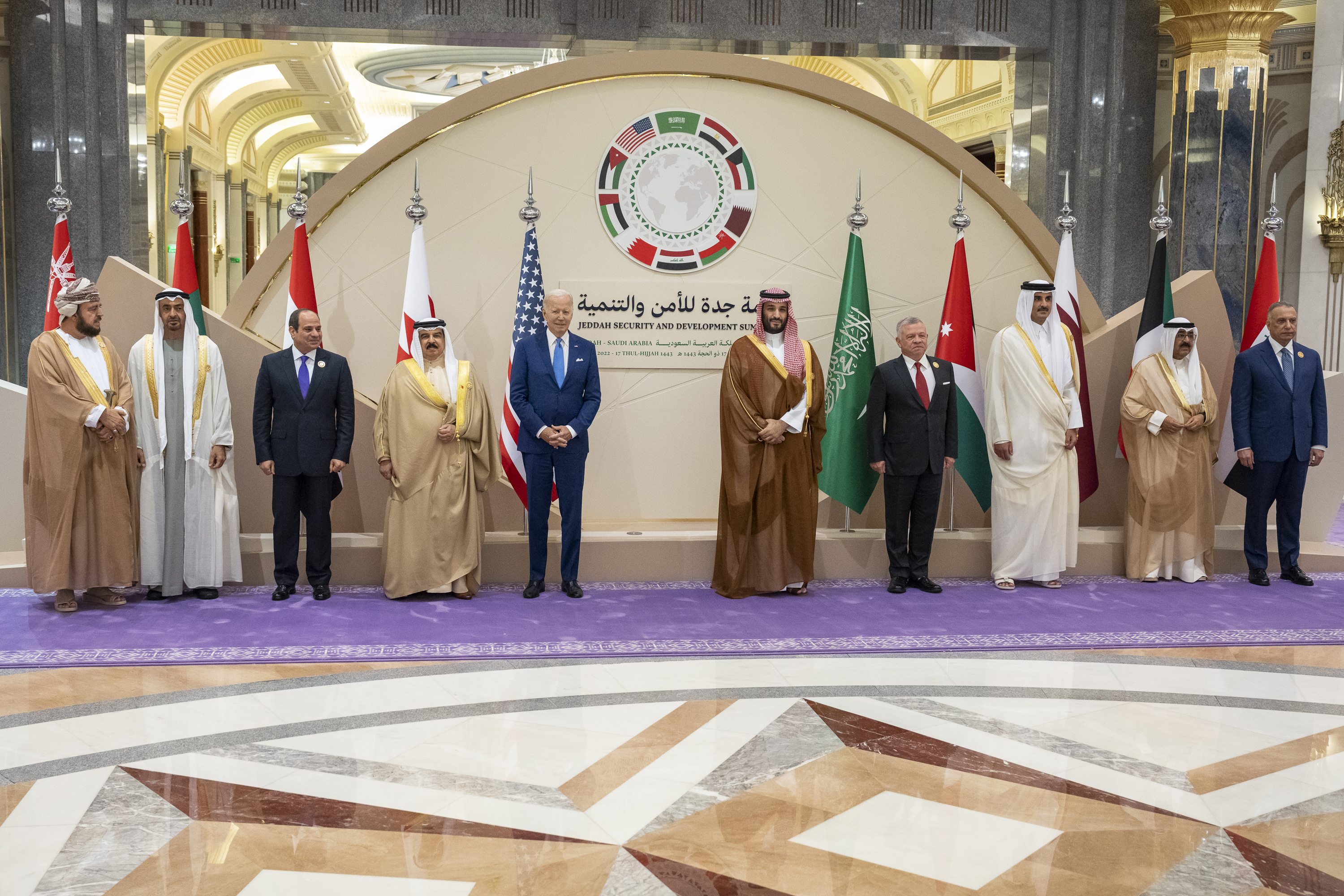
President Joe Biden alongside leaders of the Gulf Cooperation Council countries, as well as Egypt, Jordan, and Iraq (Mustafa al-Kadhimi) in the Saudi city of Jeddah in July 2022.

Iran's economic dependence under economic sanctions on Iraq increased further during the vast protests that shook the country from September 2022, which reinforced its international isolation. According to Abbas Kadhim, director of the Iraq Initiative research program at the Atlantic Council, Baghdad became more than ever for Tehran "a window to the world". Due to the persistent economic slump in Iraq, the Joe Biden administration consented to grant them a lasting waiver to the embargo imposed on Iran, which allowed the two neighboring countries to maintain bilateral trade exceeding 12 billion dollars annually. But despite a more magnanimous attitude than his predecessor, the Biden government kept a close eye on Iran-Iraq collaboration, and set limits by imposing targeted sanctions specifically targeting commercial entities linked to the Islamic Revolutionary Guard Corps. In addition, the latter stated that it would not collaborate with Iraqi leaders and ministers affiliated with pro-Iran militias that the United States had placed on the list of terrorist organizations, such as the Minister of Higher Education, Naim al-Aboudi, a member of the Asa'ib Ahl al-Haq militia. From then on, according to researcher at the Middle East Institute Randa Slim, Iraqi leaders were aware that: "if they let Tehran use their country as a back door to evade sanctions, it will endanger their relations with the United States and have serious consequences for their economic situation".

In October 2023, the resumption of the war between Israel and Hamas indirectly increased tensions in Iraq between Iranian militias favorable to Hamas and the American army that supported Israel. Clashes in Iraq caused the death of several militiamen from the Popular Mobilization Forces group, killed by American strikes, which pushed the Iraqi government of Mohammed Shia' Al Sudani, under pressure, to demand the departure of the 2,500 American soldiers deployed on its territory. But this request was qualified as unrealistic by several analysts, both from the Iraqi point of view where a necessary political consensus for such a request seemed impossible – the Kurds and Sunnis considering American protection indispensable to them – and from the American point of view for whom this deployment, relatively low-cost (5 billion dollars per year), allowed counterbalancing Iran's influence in the Middle East. In addition, the United States feared that a departure of their troops would leave Iraq to become a new base to harass other pro-American countries in the region with which Iran maintained bad relations, such as Kuwait, Saudi Arabia or Jordan. It should also be noted that according to some American media, Iraqi Prime Minister Mohammed Shia' Al Sudani reportedly backtracked in private on his statements, stating on the contrary in early January 2024 that he wished to negotiate the maintenance of American troops in Iraq. In August 2024, Iraq announced the postponement of the end of the mission on its territory of the international anti-jihadist coalition led by the United States, without giving a new date for this postponement. On 6 September, an agreement was reached between Baghdad and Washington providing for the departure from Iraq of hundreds of American soldiers by September 2025. At the same time, Mohammed Shia' Al Sudani tried to keep Iraq away from the confrontation between Iran and Israel, despite Iranian pressure and militias favorable to it, in order to preserve Iraqi territory from a potentially destructive conflict. In October 2024, he declared that "the decision of war or peace belongs to the State" to reaffirm his authority on the domestic scene and against foreign interference. In 2025, following the overthrow of the Assad regime and the weakening of Hezbollah in its war against Israel, Iraq became an even more crucial line of defense for Iran whose regional network was withering. Feeling threatened by the installation in Syria of a pro-Turkish regime while Ankara did not hide its expansionist ambitions on Iraq, Baghdad relied on the American forces deployed on its soil to preserve its integrity. In June, following the Israeli bombings on Iran followed, in retaliation, by Iranian missile fire on Israel, Iraq whose territory was located between these two countries, affirmed its desire to stay away from this conflict, despite its alliance with Tehran directed in particular against Tel Aviv. Because the Iraqi government, wishing to preserve its alliance with Washington in the context of the anti-jihadist fight in Iraq, feared that Iran would direct part of its retaliations on American bases located on its territory, Donald Trump having clearly brought his support to the Israeli offensive.

=== Mediator between Saudi Arabia and Iran ===
As a country with a population that is both Arab and majority Shiite (state religion in Iran), and borders with Saudi Arabia as with Iran, Iraq appeared as a natural buffer zone between the two enemy powers.

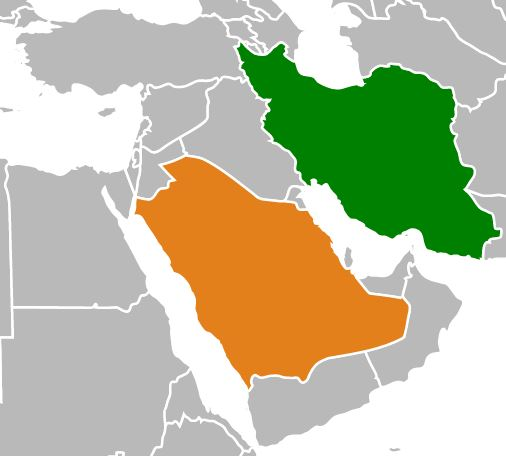
Map of the Middle East: Iraq is located between Saudi Arabia (in orange to the south) and Iran (in green to the east).

Thus, the years following the fall of Saddam Hussein, enemy of both Iran (since the Iran–Iraq War) and Saudi Arabia (since the Gulf War) saw a warming of relations between Baghdad on one hand, Tehran and Riyadh on the other, until Iraq became one of the rare countries in the Middle East (with Oman) to simultaneously have good relations with these two states. It was from 2016 that Baghdad asserted itself as a mediator, in a context of strong deterioration of relations between Saudi Arabia and Iran following on one hand the 2015 Mina stampede which caused numerous Iranian victims, on the other hand, the execution of the Saudi Shiite ayatollah Nimr al-Nimr. This execution provoked in Iran important anti-Saudi demonstrations and the sacking of the Saudi embassy in Tehran and the consulate in Mashhad, leading to the rupture of Iranian-Saudi relations on 3 January 2016.

In May 2020, the arrival of Mustafa al-Kadhimi to the post of Iraqi Prime Minister strengthened and officialized this mediator role assumed by Baghdad. Close to the United States, and consequently to Saudi Arabia their main ally in the region, he affirmed his desire to strengthen ties between Baghdad and Riyadh, while affirming that he would not allow Iraqi territory to be used to threaten Iran. When Iranian Foreign Minister Mohammad Javad Zarif traveled to Baghdad in June 2020, his message was ambivalent; he warned Mustafa al-Kadhimi against too hasty strengthening of economic ties between Iraq and the Gulf countries (fearing losing the Iraqi market vital for Iran), but at the same time, hoped to take advantage of these developments to get Iran out of its regional isolation.

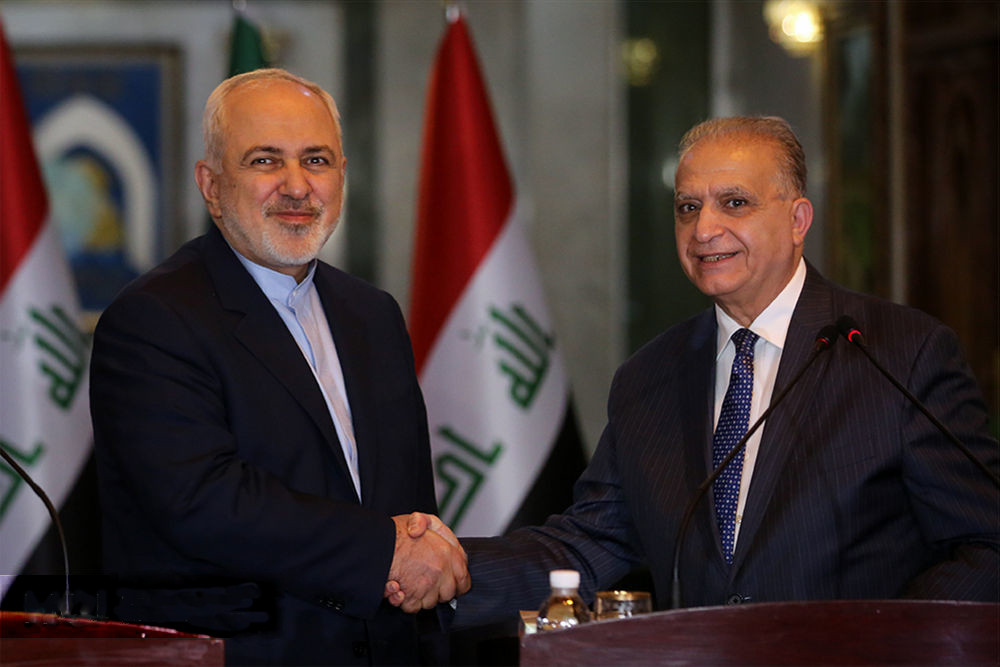
Mohammad Javad Zarif, Iranian Minister of Foreign Affairs from 2013 to 2021, and his Iraqi counterpart Mohamed Ali Alhakim (from 2018 to 2020), in 2019.

The following year, on 18 April 2021, the British daily Financial Times revealed a meeting between Iranian and Saudi representatives on 9 April 2021 in Baghdad, at the invitation of Mustafa al-Kadhimi, with a view to improving their bilateral relations. These delegations were composed of high-ranking figures within the state apparatuses, notably the head of Saudi intelligence, Khalid bin Ali al-Humaidan, and officials mandated by the secretary of the Iranian Supreme National Security Council, Ali Shamkhani. The two parties expressed their common desire to end the Yemeni civil war which had been ongoing since 2015 and in which their governments were involved by supporting enemy belligerents, but kept important divergences on other files. By convening this meeting, Mustafa al-Kadhimi's objectives were multiple: prove that his government was both worthy of the trust of Tehran and Riyadh to facilitate these talks, restrict Iraqi paramilitary groups with Iran's help, and on the domestic political level, gain credit ahead of the Iraqi legislative elections in October 2021.

The following week, Prince Mohammed bin Salman stated in an interview with the Saudi channel al-Arabiya, that Iran was "a neighboring country with which Saudi Arabia hopes to maintain good relations", while Iranian Ministry of Foreign Affairs spokesperson Saeed Khatibzadeh declared that Iran"has always welcomed dialogue with the Saudi kingdom and considers it beneficial for the peoples of the two countries". The Lebanese newspaper L'Orient-Le Jour revealed that a second series of Iranian-Saudi talks in Iraq was to take place in the following weeks. In August, the new Iranian president Ebrahim Raisi in turn commented on these talks by declaring that he "saw no obstacles" to the restoration of ties with Riyadh.

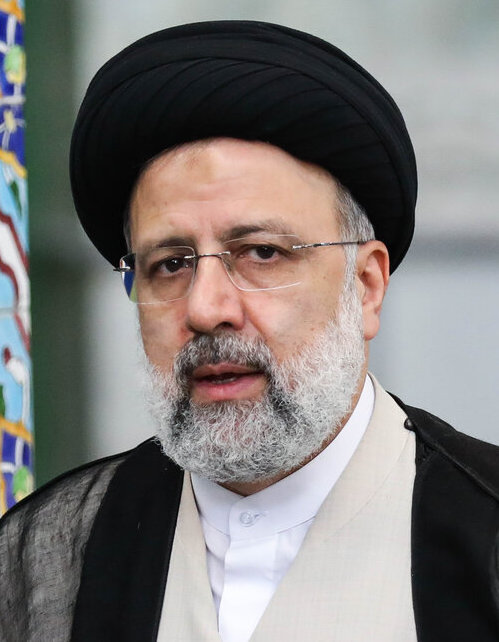
Ebrahim Raisi, Iranian president since August 2021.

In August 2021, Iraqi Prime Minister Mustafa al-Kadhimi organized in Baghdad a regional summit also including France, where representatives from Saudi Arabia, United Arab Emirates, Kuwait, Qatar, Iran, Turkey, Egypt, and Jordan were invited. The stated objective was to defuse tensions in the region and reach agreements on pressing issues such as the Yemeni civil war, the economic and social crisis in Lebanon, maritime security or the scarcity of water in the region. At the end of September in Baghdad, two Iranian and Saudi officials met again, discussions between the regional rivals continuing after the election to the Iranian presidency of the ultraconservative Ebrahim Raisi.

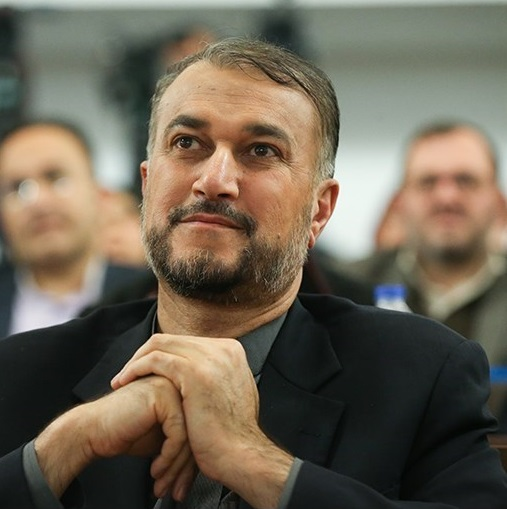
Hossein Amir-Abdollahian, Iranian Minister of Foreign Affairs in the government of Ebrahim Raisi.

In April 2022, Iranian and Saudi delegations met again in Baghdad a month after the suspension of their dialogue caused by the execution in Saudi Arabia of 81 people for "terrorism", including men linked to the Houthi (pro-Iranian) rebels in Yemen. These delegations notably included high officials from the secretariat of the Iranian Supreme National Security Council and the head of Saudi intelligence services. On 30 April, Iraqi Prime Minister Mustafa al-Kadhimi declared that an agreement was "close" and that talks would continue with the aim of leading to a "restoration of diplomatic representations" between the two rival powers. On 25 June, Mustafa al-Kadhimi announced that he was traveling to Saudi Arabia and Iran as part of his mediation, without however specifying the identity of his interlocutors on site.

In December 2022, a new "Baghdad conference" (following that of August 2021) was organized, this time in Jordan, intended to encourage dialogue between the countries of the region, notably Saudi Arabia and Iran represented by their foreign ministers, Faisal bin Farhan and Hossein Amir-Abdollahian. The latter declared having had during this summit a "friendly interview with some of my counterparts, notably the foreign ministers of Oman, Qatar, Iraq, Kuwait and Saudi Arabia". The new head of the Iraqi government Mohammed Shia' Al Sudani for his part affirmed his desire to "strengthen his ties" with Arab countries, while multiplying signs of closeness with Tehran, while Riyadh multiplied promises of investments in Iraq. According to researcher associated with the European Council on Foreign Relations Hamzeh Hadad: "For the Saudis, it is clear that isolating Iraq will not end its relations with Iran. They now know that they must compete with Tehran to have good relations with Iraq.".

In May 2025, Iraq hosted the Arab League Summit in Baghdad, with Saudi Arabia and the UAE pledging $6 billion in investments. Iraq sought to strengthen Arab cooperation to counterbalance Iranian influence while addressing domestic needs. The government introduced legislation to place the Popular Mobilisation Forces under the Prime Minister's authority to reduce foreign influence and support regional integration.

In February 2023, Iranian Foreign Minister Hossein Amir-Abdollahian traveled to Baghdad to exchange with his Iraqi counterpart on talks with Saudi Arabia. The latter also evoked a similar mediation in progress led by Baghdad (which he thanked) between Iran and Egypt which broke their diplomatic relations following the Iranian Revolution of 1979. The following month, Riyadh and Tehran announced the restoration of their diplomatic relations, a decision welcomed by Baghdad.

During the summer of 2023, Iraq received several billion dollars in investment promises from Saudi Arabia, the United Arab Emirates, and Qatar. Analyses saw a double geopolitical objective in these decisions to invest: on one hand, to distance Baghdad from its economic dependence on Tehran; on the other hand, to ensure that these investments also indirectly benefit the Iranian economy, contributing to easing their diplomatic relations with Iran. At the end of July, Iraqi Foreign Minister Fouad Hussein received in Baghdad his Yemeni counterpart Ahmed Awad bin Mubarak, to whom he proposed Iraqi mediation to end the Yemeni civil war opposing pro-Iranian and pro-Saudi fighters since 2015.

Following the fall of the Assad regime in Syria in December 2024, Baghdad positioned itself as a mediator between the new Sunni Islamist Syrian authorities and the Iranian government, for whom this overthrow was the loss of a precious ally. Although mistrustful, like Tehran, of its new Syrian counterpart, the Iraqi government had every interest in forging friendly relations with the latter to prevent a resurgence of ISIS.

=== Access to the Persian Gulf ===
Similar to Morocco's claims over Western Sahara, Iraqi claims over Kuwait have long affected its relations with the other countries of the Arabian Peninsula. While historical reasons have often been invoked by the Iraqi power to justify its sovereignty over the Emirate (the union of the two territories in the Basra vilayet under the Ottoman Empire), the main current geopolitical reasons concern access to the sea of the Persian Gulf. Indeed, while the Iraqi coastline measures only 58 km, the fact that most of the nearby islands belong to Iran or Kuwait contributes strongly to the enclavement of Iraqi territory.

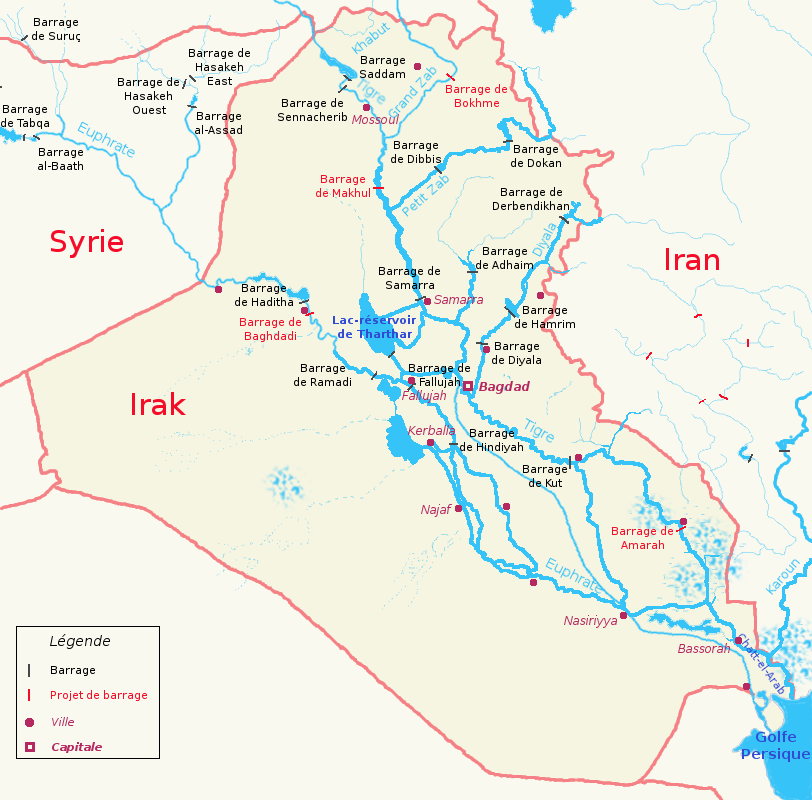
Route of the main Iraqi rivers (Tigris and Euphrates) which meet in the Shatt al-Arab estuary at the bottom right of the map.

Thus, starting from the 1950s, every time the Emir of Kuwait expressed his wish to fix the border route, Iraq demanded in exchange access to the islands of Warbah and Bubiyan. The repeated refusals of Kuwait led Great Britain to propose in 1954 a compromise under which the emirate would lease the island to Iraq, a compromise rejected by the emir in 1956.

On the Iranian side, the impasse in negotiations on the Shatt al-Arab, the river delimiting the two states and flowing into the Persian Gulf was an important factor in the outbreak of war in 1980. In 1988, hoping again for concessions from Kuwait which had been its ally against Iran, Iraq undertook major works to develop the ports of Umm Qasr and Zubair in order to increase their capacities. In doing so, having made the strategic decision to orient a significant part of its maritime trade towards the area whose access is controlled by the Kuwaiti islands, Iraq backed down from its absolute intransigence on the Shatt al-Arab file without Tehran having retreated from its position. One can then wonder if at the end of hostilities with Iran, Saddam Hussein had not already made the decision, while yielding to Iranian demands on the Shatt al-Arab, to invade Kuwait to gain access to the coveted islands.

Since the overthrow of Saddam Hussein in 2003, although the Iraqi government has renounced its expansionist policy on Kuwait and Iran, conflicts remain between Iraq and its neighbors over their maritime sovereignty and competition between their port infrastructures.

== Separatism ==
=== Kurdish question ===
Iraq is, along with Turkey, Iran, and Syria, one of the main countries where Kurdish populations are concentrated. Their total number varies, according to sources, from 25 to 35 million, including 12 to 15 million in Turkey (20% of the population), 6 million in Iran (8% of the population), 4.7 million in Iraq (15 to 20% of the population), and 2 million in Syria (15%).

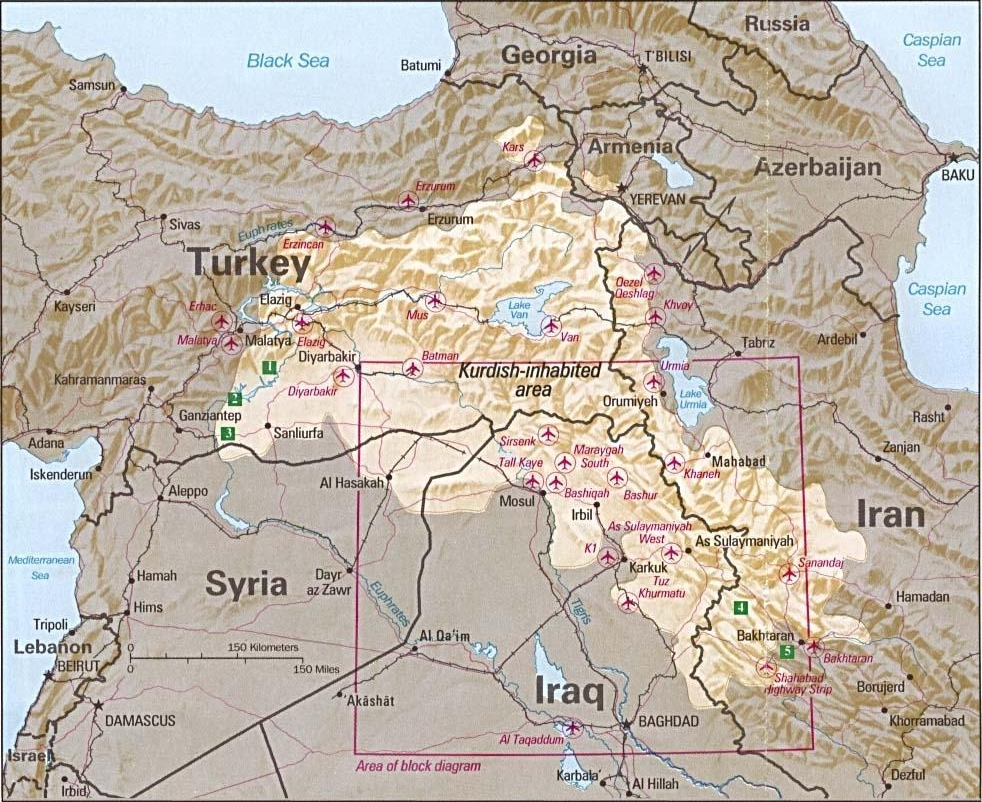
Kurdish-inhabited areas in the north of Iraq, northwest of Iran, southeast of Turkey, and northeast of Syria.

Persecuted under Saddam Hussein, the Kurds participated in the 1991 uprising after the Iraqi defeat in the Gulf War, and obtained de facto autonomy helped by a no-fly zone imposed from 1992 to 2003 by the United States and the United Kingdom, legalized by the 2005 Iraqi Constitution which established it as a federal region. On the international scene, the United Nations Security Council mandated a "United Nations Assistance Mission for Iraq" (UNAMI) to help the new Iraqi government to "develop procedures for resolving internal border disputes".

Nevertheless, despite this federal autonomy, no country in the region (with the exception of Israel) is clearly in favor of the independence of the Iraqi Kurdistan. Kurdish separatism is a particularly sensitive issue for Turkey, which has faced since the 1980s an insurrection by the Kurdistan Workers' Party (PKK) in the southeast of the country that has caused tens of thousands of deaths. Kurdish independence aspirations are to a lesser extent present in Iran, where deadly clashes regularly occur between the Revolutionary Guards and certain Iranian Kurdish groups, including the Kurdistan Democratic Party of Iran. Turkish and Iranian separatist groups also have bases and training camps in northern Iraq, provoking several bombings and armed incursions by these two countries (especially Turkey), condemned by Baghdad as violations of its sovereignty. An ambivalent behavior by the Iraqi government, which also feels threatened by the separatist ambitions of Iraqi Kurds.

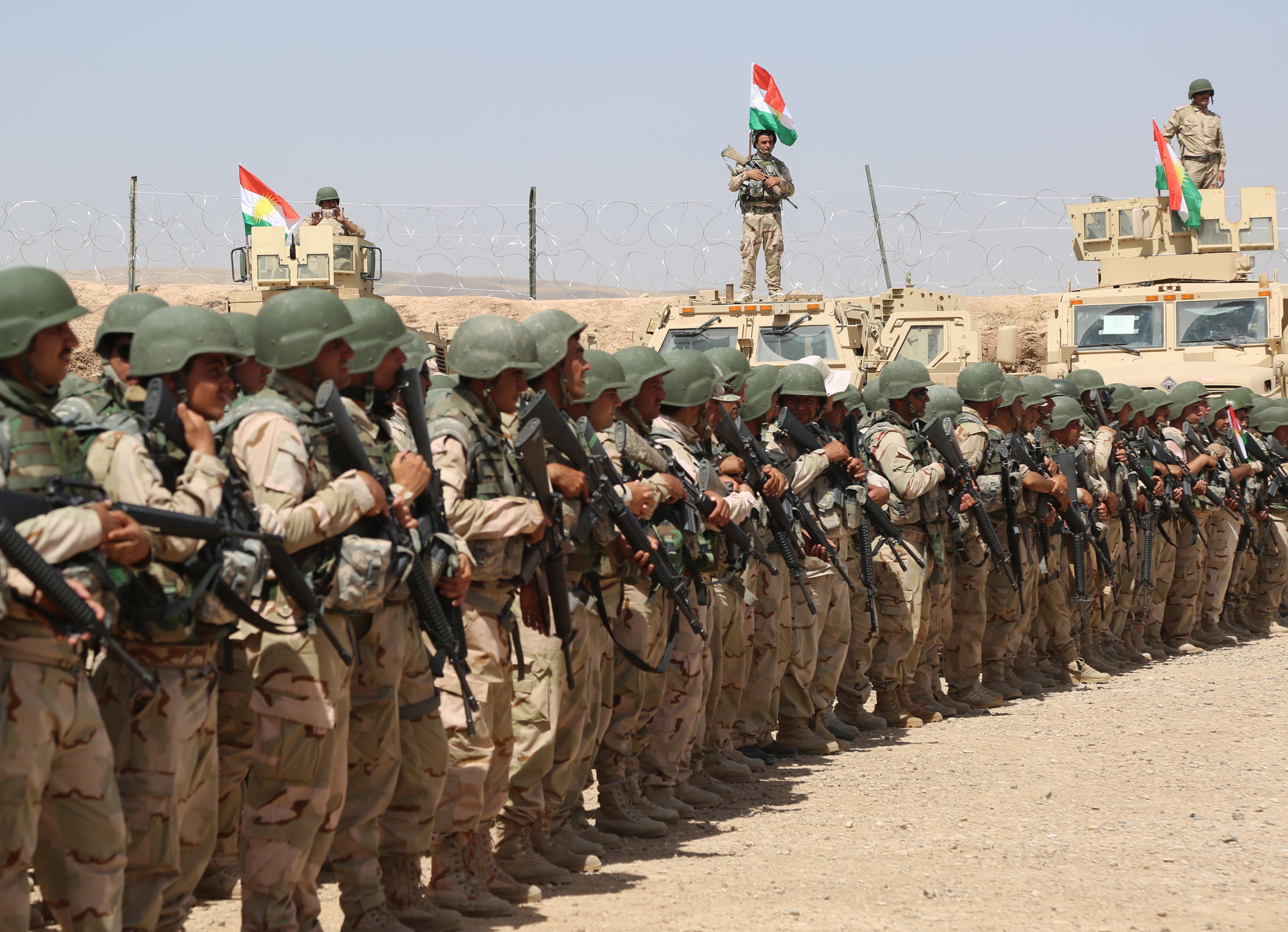
Iraqi Peshmerga fighters in an American training center in northern Iraq in 2016

==== Failed independence refendum ====
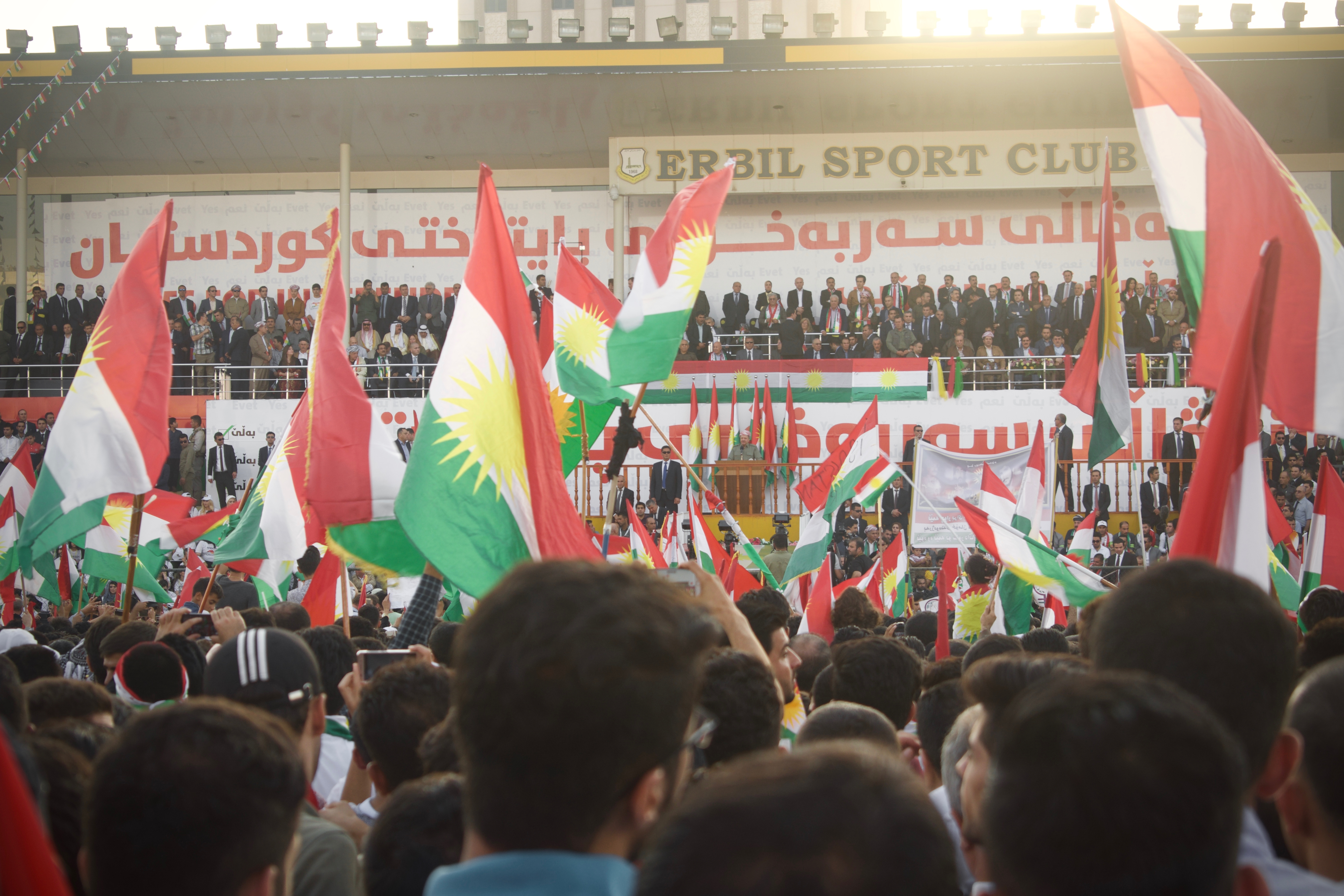
Rally of Masoud Barzani ahead of the 2017 Kurdistan Region independence referendum.

During the war against ISIS the capital of Iraqi Kurdistan Erbil rose in power on the international scene thanks to the crucial role played by the Peshmerga in the fight against the Islamic State, perceived as a global threat, while the Baghdad government was perceived as weak and unstable. While Erbil hosted for years a parade of diplomats and high military commanders, Masoud Barzani decided as early as July 2014 to take advantage of this unprecedented influence of his region to organize an independence referendum, counting on strong international support. But this prospect which would lead to a partition of Iraq provoked strong concerns in the Middle East and beyond, while a large part of the country, occupied by the Islamic State, already escaped the control of the government.

In June 2017, in view of this referendum planned for September, Turkish Foreign Minister Mevlüt Çavuşoğlu declared that "The territorial integrity of Iraq and its political unity are fundamental principles of Turkey's Iraq policy". Two months later, Iranian General Mohamed Bagheri declared that such a geographical change "could provoke tensions and clashes inside Iraq, and this will not be limited to this country", while the Syrian Foreign Minister Walid al-Muallem, declared "support for the unity of Iraq", and that this "separatist referendum is totally unacceptable". In October 2017, the Iraqi armed forces initiated a military retaliation which resulted in immediate Kurdish defeat and capitulation.

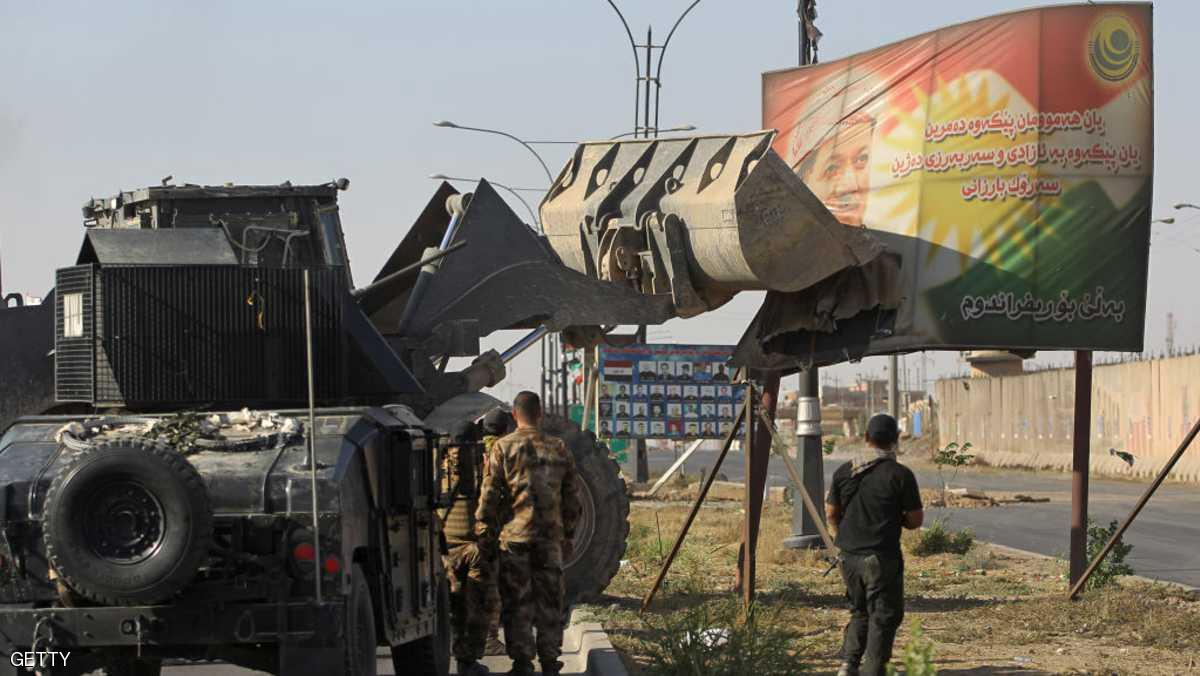
Iraqi soldiers break a poster of Barzani following Kurdish defeat in Kirkuk, October 2017

This convergence of interests in what they perceive as a threat to the integrity of their respective territories is an important factor in the rapprochement and cooperation between these four states hosting Kurdish communities with separatist ambitions. The United States, another influential actor in the region, sought to strengthen the Iraqi state, notably to counter Tehran's influence, and could not afford to see it weakened by a secession of Kurdish-populated territories. This lack of international support and the takeover by the Baghdad government of the main oil fields in the region, making it unable to subsist financially, caused the failure of the Iraqi Kurdistan secession attempt.

==== Erosion of Kurdish autonomy ====
In September 2023, Al-Monitor published a leaked letter sent by the Prime Minister of Kurdistan Region, Masrour Barzani, to the then-US president Joe Biden urging him to intervene on issues threatening the Kurdistan Region, stating: "I write to you now at another critical juncture in our history, one that I fear we may have difficulty overcoming. ...[W]e are bleeding economically and hemorrhaging politically. For the first time in my tenure as prime minister, I hold grave concerns that this dishonorable campaign against us may cause the collapse of ... the very model of a Federal Iraq that the United States sponsored in 2003 and purported to stand by since." According to the Arab Gulf States Institute, the failed Kurdistan Region independence referendum caused "a sequence of profound reversals for Iraq’s Kurdish region, including the loss of 40% of the territory it had controlled since 2014 and over 250,000 barrels per day in oil production from the fields in Kirkuk". The referendum prompted the Iraqi central government to actively seek to consolidate power "utilizing legal, financial, political, and military pressures against the Kurdistan Region". In October 2023, the US-based think tank Foreign Policy Research Institute called this undertaking by the Iraqi government "recentralization". In July 2024, the Wilson Center wrote of the "demise of federalism" in Iraq, stating that the legacy of the US-led invasion of the country; that is, the federalization of the country and Kurdish autonomy has been eroding since the failed referendum and the subsequent actions taken by the Iraqi government as well as the judiciary, specifically the Federal Supreme Court of Iraq.

== See also ==
- Iran–Iraq War
- Gulf War
- Iraq War
- Arab League
- List of diplomatic visits to Iraq
- Organisation of Islamic Cooperation
- OPEC
- Baghdad Pact
- Arab socialism
- 2025 Iraq oil for water deal

== Bibliography ==
=== Books ===
- Chapour Haghighat (1991). Histoire de la crise du Golfe (in French). Questions au 20th century. pp. 253 to 263.
- Dominique Perrin (2000). "D'une guerre à l'autre : Le mandat britannique". Palestine, Une terre, deux peuples. Histoire et civilisations (in French). Presses universitaires du Septentrion. pp. 123–182. ISBN 978-2-7574-2198-7.
- Marc Lavergne; Brigitte Dumortier (2002). L'Oman contemporain: Etat, territoire, identité [Contemporary Oman: State, Territory, Identity] (in French). Karthala. pp. 109 to 113. ISBN 978-2-84586-293-7.
- Pierre-Jean Luizard (August 2002). La question irakienne [The Iraqi question] (in French). Fayard.
- Yevgeni Primakov (November 2003). Le monde après le 11 septembre et la guerre en Irak [The world after 11 September and the war in Iraq] (in French). Presses de la Renaissance. pp. 171 to 190.
- Mohieddine Hadhri; François Pelletier (February 2016). "Le Moyen-Orient dans la Seconde Guerre mondiale : convoitises et rivalités des grandes puissances belligérantes" [The Middle East in World War II: the ambitions and rivalries of the major belligerent powers]. Guerres Mondiales et Conflits Contemporains (in French). 262 (2). Presses universitaires de France: 93–106. doi:10.3917/gmcc.262.0093.
- Hoda Nasser (September 2020). Nasser, Archives secrètes [Nasser, Secret Archives] (in French). Flammarion. p. 368.

=== Academic and scientific articles ===
- Pierre Rossi (1961). "Le 14 juillet 1958 ne fut-il en Irak qu'un coup d'Etat ?" [Was 14 July 1958, in Iraq merely a coup d'état?]. Politique étrangère (in French): 7.
- Habib Ishow (1968). "Les relations entre l'Irak et le Koweït" [Relations between Iraq and Kuwait]. Politique étrangère (in French): 35.
- Marie Mendras (1983). "La logique de l'URSS au Moyen-Orient" [The logic of the USSR in the Middle East]. Politique étrangère (in French): 15.
- Bassma Kodmani (1991). "Que faire de l'Irak ?" [What to do about Iraq?]. Politique étrangère (in French): 17.
- Wanda Dressler (2006). "Un dilemme renouvelé : la Russie après le 11/9 et l'Irak" [A renewed dilemma: Russia after 9/11 and Iraq]. Strates (in French) (12): 15. doi:10.4000/strates.2212.
- Anne-Lucie Chaigne-Oudin (1 February 2010). "Irak" [Iraq]. Les clés du Moyen-Orient (in French): 10.
- Anne-Lucie Chaigne-Oudin (9 March 2010). "Premier conflit israélo-arabe de 1948" [First Arab-Israeli War of 1948]. Les clés du Moyen-Orient (in French): 2.
- Anne-Lucie Chaigne-Oudin (20 September 2010). "Les 30 ans de la guerre Iran-Irak (22 septembre 1980-20 août 1988)" [30 years since the Iran-Iraq War (22 September 1980 – 20 August 1988)]. Les clés du Moyen-Orient (in French): 3.
- Adeeb S.A. Munim et Muhammed Saïd Sahib (March 2011). "Irak-Koweït. L'hiver au printemps" [Iraq-Kuwait. Winter in spring]. Outre-Terre (in French). 29 (3): 481–482. doi:10.3917/oute.029.0481.
- Allan Kaval (21 November 2011). "Les Barzani" [The Barzani]. Les clés du Moyen-Orient (in French): 6.
- Kristian Coates Ulrichsen (27 November 2015). "La politique britannique en Mésopotamie (avril 1916-mars 1917)" [British policy in Mesopotamia (April 1916–March 1917)]. Orient XXI (in French): 4.
- Quentin Müller et Sabrine Lakhram (25 April 2019). "Comment le communisme a façonné le chiisme politique irakien" [How Communism Shaped Iraqi Political Shiism]. Orient XXI (in French): 4.
- Abdelkhalek Farouk (13 May 2019). "Comment en finir avec la corruption en Irak" [How to end corruption in Iraq]. Orient XXI (in French): 4.
- Abdulamir Al-Rekaby (30 August 2016). "Les étranges convergences irano-américaines en Irak" [The strange Iranian-American convergence in Iraq]. Orient XXI (in French): 4.
- Feurat Alani (4 November 2016). "Un appétit turc pas si soudain pour l'Irak - Ankara face aux ambitions iraniennes" [Turkey's not-so-sudden appetite for Iraq - Ankara faces Iranian ambitions]. Orient XXI (in French): 4.
- Oriane Huchon (30 March 2017). "Cartographie de l'expansion et du démembrement de l'Empire ottoman" [Mapping the expansion and dismemberment of the Ottoman Empire]. Les clés du Moyen-Orient (in French).
- Matthieu Rey (1 July 2018). "1958. Quand l'Irak découvrait l'espérance révolutionnaire" [1958. When Iraq discovered revolutionary hope]. Orient XXI (in French): 4.
- Ali Naji (11 April 2019). "Entre Téhéran et Washington, le pouvoir irakien navigue à vue" [Between Tehran and Washington, the Iraqi government is playing it by ear]. Orient XXI (in French): 4.
- Pierre-Yves Baillet (16 December 2019). "La Turquie et ses frontières, du zéro à l'infini" [Turkey and its borders, from zero to infinity]. Orient XXI (in French): 4.
- Ella Shohat (22 October 2020). "Il y a soixante-dix ans, le départ des juifs irakiens" [Seventy years ago, the departure of Iraqi Jews]. Orient XXI (in French): 4.
- François Nicoullaud (18 November 2020). "Nucléaire iranien. Les délicats défis de Joe Biden" [Iran's nuclear program: Joe Biden's delicate challenges]. Orient XXI (in French): 4.
- Pierre Prier (4 March 2021). "Irak. Le pèlerinage très politique du pape François" [Iraq. Pope Francis' highly political pilgrimage]. Orient XXI (in French): 4.
- Jean-Michel Morel (23 March 2021). "L'Iran et la Turquie s'affrontent à fleurets mouchetés" [Iran and Turkey engage in a war of words]. Orient XXI (in French): 4.
- Julien Mangold; Sophie Pommier (21 September 2022). "Que sont les « territoires disputés » d'Irak ?" [What are Iraq's "disputed territories"?]. Orient XXI (in French).
- Laurent Perpigna Iban (26 September 2022). "Le Kurdistan irakien dans l'impasse et les divisions" [Iraqi Kurdistan at an impasse and divided]. Orient XXI (in French).
- Laurent Perpigna Iban (9 November 2022). "En Irak, déchirements chez les chiites" [In Iraq, divisions among Shiites]. Orient XXI (in French).
- Wassim Nasr (21 March 2023). "Comment le continent africain est devenu l'épicentre de l'activité djihadiste" [How the African continent became the epicenter of jihadist activity]. Orient XXI (in French).
- Robin Beaumont (6 January 2025). "L'Irak, ou la Résistance « désaxée »" [Iraq, or the "misguided" Resistance]. Orient XXI (in French).

=== Encyclopedic sources ===
- "Accords d'Alger (1975)" [Algiers Agreements (1975)]. Encyclopædia Universalis (in French). nd.
- "Ahmed Hassan al-Bakr". Encyclopædia Universalis (in French). nd.
- "Ligue arabe" [Arab League]. Le Monde diplomatique (in French). nd.
- "Pacte de Bagdad" [Baghdad Pact]. Le Monde diplomatique (in French).

=== Press ===
- Jacques Dumarcay (1 July 1968). "Les rapports avec la France n'ont cessé de s'améliorer depuis l'instauration de la République à Bagdad" [Relations with France have steadily improved since the establishment of the Republic in Baghdad.]. Le Monde diplomatique (in French): 1.
- Paul Balta (April 1972). "Depuis un an l'Union soviétique a acquis une forte position en Irak" [Over the past year, the Soviet Union has gained a strong position in Iraq.]. Le Monde diplomatique (in French): 10.
- Drew Middleton (4 October 1982). "Sudanese brigades could provide key aid for Iraq; Military Analysis". The New York Times.
- Amnon Kapeliouk (1 October 1987). "Comment Israël tire parti d'une guerre prolongée" [How Israel benefits from a prolonged war]. Le Monde diplomatique (in French): 2.
- Henry Laurens (1 April 2003). "Comment l'Empire ottoman fut dépecé" [How the Ottoman Empire was carved up]. Le Monde diplomatique (in French): 2.
- "Les attentats les plus meurtriers en Irak depuis le 1er mai" [The deadliest attacks in Iraq since 1 May]. La Libre Belgique (in French). 2 March 2004. p. 1.
- Nicolas Bourcier (4 May 2009). "La base turque d'Incirlik, enjeu stratégique américain" [The Turkish base at Incirlik, a strategic issue for the United States]. Le Monde (in French). p. 3.
- "Guerre du Kippour : quand le Maroc et l'Algérie se battaient côte à côte" [The Yom Kippur War: when Morocco and Algeria fought side by side]. Jeune Afrique (in French). 7 November 2013. p. 2.
- Anthony Samrani (13 March 2015). "Iran, de la république à l'empire ?" [Iran, from republic to empire?]. L'Orient le Jour (in French). p. 4.
- Gabrielle Legoux (4 August 2015). "Oman en passe de devenir la Suisse du Moyen-Orient ?" [Is Oman on its way to becoming the Switzerland of the Middle East?]. L'Orient le Jour (in French). p. 4.
- "Israel turns to Kurds for three-quarters of its oil supplies". Financial Times. 23 August 2015. p. 2.
- Georges Malbrunot (4 February 2016). "Les troupes syriennes progressent vers Alep" [Syrian troops advance toward Aleppo]. Le Figaro (in French). p. 1.
- Caroline Hayek (10 June 2017). "Les enjeux du référendum d'indépendance au Kurdistan irakien" [The stakes of the independence referendum in Iraqi Kurdistan]. L'Orient-Le Jour (in French). p. 3.
- Yoann Coquio (21 July 2017). "La relation Iran-Irak, entre influences et résistances" [Iran-Iraq relations: between influence and resistance]. L'Orient-Le Jour (in French). p. 1.
- Samia Medawar (21 August 2017). "Nouri Saïd, le défenseur haï du royaume hachémite d'Irak" [Nouri Saïd, the hated defender of the Hashemite Kingdom of Iraq]. L'Orient-Le Jour (in French). p. 3.
- Nada Merhi (24 November 2018). "Camille Chamoun, un président visionnaire" [Camille Chamoun, a visionary president]. L'Orient-Le Jour (in French). p. 3.
- Élie Saïkali (21 May 2019). "Bagdad peut-il rester neutre dans la crise américano-iranienne ?" [Can Baghdad remain neutral in the US-Iran crisis?]. L'Orient-Le Jour (in French). p. 2.
- Anthony Samrani (3 January 2020). "Pourquoi l'élimination de Soleimani ressemble à une déclaration de guerre" [Why Soleimani's elimination looks like a declaration of war]. L'Orient-Le Jour (in French). p. 2.
- Julie Kebbi (29 May 2020). "Riyad fait un pas supplémentaire vers Bagdad" [Riyadh takes another step toward Baghdad]. L'Orient-Le Jour (in French). p. 2.
- Soulayma Mardem Bey (23 July 2020). "Kazimi, potentiel médiateur entre Riyad et Téhéran ?" [Kazimi, potential mediator between Riyadh and Tehran?]. L'Orient Le Jour (in French). p. 2.
- Salam Faraj et Maya Gebeily (21 September 2020). "Ennemi juré devenu grand frère : en 40 ans, l'Iran a transformé ses relations avec l'Irak" [From sworn enemy to big brother: in 40 years, Iran has transformed its relations with Iraq]. L'Orient-Le Jour (in French). p. 4.
- Soulayma Mardem Bey (6 February 2021). "Téhéran affiche son unité avec les autorités irakiennes" [Tehran shows unity with Iraqi authorities]. L'Orient-Le Jour (in French). p. 4.
- Sammy Ketz (6 April 2021). "Abdallah II, ou l'obsession de la stabilité" [Abdullah II, or the obsession with stability]. L'Orient le Jour (in French). p. 2.
- Soulayma Mardem Bey (12 April 2021). "Cent ans d'un royaume improbable : la stabilité à tout prix – II" [One hundred years of an unlikely kingdom: stability at any cost – II]. L'Orient-Le Jour (in French). p. 3.
- Soulayma Mardem Bey (19 April 2021). "Entre Riyad et Téhéran, un premier pas vers la désescalade ?" [Between Riyadh and Tehran, a first step toward de-escalation?]. L'Orient le Jour (in French). p. 3.
- Noura Doukhi (29 April 2021). "Iran : pourquoi MBS a changé de ton" [Iran: why MBS has changed his tone]. L'Orient le Jour (in French). p. 2.
- Laurent Perpigna Iban (16 November 2022). "En Irak, l'étau se resserre autour de l'opposition kurde iranienne" [In Iraq, the noose tightens around the Iranian Kurdish opposition]. L'Orient le Jour (in French).
- "Un sommet à Amman pour tenter de désamorcer les crises régionales" [Summit in Amman to try to defuse regional crises]. L'Orient le Jour (in French). 20 December 2022.
- Emmanuel Haddad (20 December 2022). "Équilibrisme à l'irakienne : soigner l'Iran sans froisser le Golfe" [Iraqi balancing act: treating Iran without upsetting the Gulf]. L'Orient le Jour (in French).
- "Avec l'organisation de la Coupe du Golfe de football, l'Irak veut retrouver la lumière" [By hosting the Gulf Cup soccer tournament, Iraq wants to get back in the spotlight.]. RFI (in French). 6 January 2023.
