= Transport in Syria =

Transport in Syria is possible by rail, road, air or rivers, both public and private. Syria is an Asian country with a well-developed rail network (2,052 km (1,275 mi)) and a highway system (782 km (486 mi)).

Syria's main international airport is the Damascus International Airport in the capital, Damascus.

== Railways ==
Syrian Railways is a state-owned company, and is the national railway company.

As of 2006, Syria's railway network totaled 2,052 kilometres (1,275 mi). Of this, 1,801 kilometres (1,119 mi) consisted of standard gauge track at 1,435 mm (4 ft 8½ in), while 251 km were narrow gauge lines measuring 1,050 mm (3 ft 5 11/32 in).

Syria's railways have operational links with Turkey, connecting at Qamishli–Nusaybin o standard-gauge track, and with Iraq at Al-Yaarubiyah–Rabia, also using standard-gauge. A connection with Jordan exists on narrow-gauge track, and in 2005 work began to construct a standard-gauge line.

Rail links with Israel and Lebanon are defunct, though in 2026, Syria and Lebanon signed a formal agreement to revive their cross-border rail connections.

=== Developments ===
- On April 22, 2005, Syria ratified the Agreement on International Railways in the Arab Mashreq, which provides for the implementation of a variety of north–south and east–west links between the states of the region, including the restoration of direct rail links between Syria and Lebanon and Iraq.
- On July 7, 2005, the Syrian General Establishment for the Hejaz Railway announced that it had signed a contract worth US$54 million with a Lebanese company to build a railroad between Damascus and Damascus International Airport.
- 2007 - proposed high-capacity public metro system in Damascus, revived in 2025.
- 2008 - proposed joint rolling stock factory with Turkey at Aleppo
- 2023 - the restoration of the rail link with Iraq (IRR) and the proposal to extend the railway from Al-Qaim in Iraq through Al-Bukamal in Syria to Homs for a total distance of 270 kilometers and thence to Tartus are under discussion. This will establish rail connection with Iran (RAI) and Persian Gulf.
- In August 2026, Syria and Lebanon agreed to develop a joint plan to restore railway and other transport links between the two countries, establishing a joint technical team to oversee the project and revive the cross border rail link between Tripoli and Homs .

== Road transport ==
An overland trans-desert bus service between Beirut, Haifa, Damascus and Baghdad was established by the Nairn Transport Company of Damascus in 1923.

As Bashar al-Assad regime has fallen in 2024 and the global sanctions have been lifted, there are new efforts to rehabilitate the road network in Syria. Re-asphalting the roads, refurbishing the medians (Replacing or fixing the light posts, inserting new plants and cleaning the median area), replacing or inserting new Jersey barrier blocks in main trunk roads.

As Google Maps has limited functions in Syria since 2013, meaning that the last modifications are applied since 2013, there are no real-time updates on the maps from that time until now, limiting the ability to accurately navigate through the app. OpenStreetMap can be dependent as an alternative to Google Maps, but needs more collaborations to improve the overall map. There are efforts by the Ministry of Communication and Information Technology to uplift the ban of Google services on Syria, enabling the ability rehabilitate maps in Syria.

Ministry of Local Administration has recently launched a new project to rename the landmarks in Syria. The road numbering system will be updated, preserving the M- system or adding new codes is probable.

=== Roads ===
As of 2006, Syria had a total road network of 68,157 kilometres (42,351 mi). Of this, 61,514 kilometres (38,223 mi) were paved, including 1,103 kilometres (685 mi) of expressways, while the remaining 6,643 kilometres (4,128 mi) consisted of unpaved roads.

The previous study is not intended currently for reference as it has been deprecated since new roads and highways had been paved. The Ministry of Transport will produce a new report of the road network state soon.

=== Motorways ===
Syria has a well-developed system of motorways in the western half of the country. The country had joined the Arab Mashreq International Road Network, creating new corridors passing through Syria to other eastern Arab countries. The eastern part nevertheless has only connection through two lanes roads due to the sparsity of the population (M15 is an exception, because Raqqa - Aleppo motorway has been paved since 2009).

Note: There are no traffic signs that indicates the local M- system, they are originally indicated in Google Maps and OpenStreetMap. Only Arab Mashreq International Road Network shield signs are existent in the motorways and officially mentioned in the official reports produced by Ministry of Transport.

The main motorways, including its parent corridors specified in Arab Mashreq International Road Network, in Syria are the following:

- M1 (M20) – Runs from Homs to Latakia. It also connects Tartus, Baniyas and Jableh. Its length is 174 km.
- M2 (M30) – Runs from Damascus to Jdeidat Yabous, on the border with Lebanon. It also connects Al-Sabboura. Its length is 38 km.
- M4 (M10) – Runs from Latakia to Saraqib. It also connects Ariha and Jisr ash-Shughur. The highway between Ariha and Latakia (96 km) is constructed by Al-Kharafi construction company, applying the international motorway specifications. Its length is 120 km. Assuming that it shares some 60 km with the Motorway M5, it arrives until Aleppo, and from there, it has been expanded as a two-lane expressway (from Abu-Al-Zenden and beyond) that continues further east into the Iraqi border in Al-Yaarubiyah, ultimately reaching its destination at Mosul. The eastern part of the motorway
- M5 (M45) – This is the most important motorway in the country, due to its length and as it functions as the south–north backbone of the country network. It connects the border with Jordan in the south with Damascus, the capital, and continues further north to Aleppo, the country's second largest city. Its length is 450 kilometres (280 mi).
- M20 – The corridor which M1 part of. Also known as Desert Highway. Runs from Palmyra to Deir ez-Zor, it also connects Al-Sukhnah. Its length is 203 kilometres (126 mi).
- M15 – Also known as Aleppo - Raqqa motorway. Runs from Aleppo to Raqqa through Mansoura and Tabqa District. The motorway continues as a two-lane expressway until reaching Bokamal.
- Damascus International Airport Motorway – Runs from Al-Motahallik Al-Janobi (Damascus Southern Bypass Ring) and ends in Damascus International Airport

=== Key Highways ===
There are honorable mentions of highways that are a part of the road network in Syria.

Note: The old road numbering system is now deprecated and will be replaced later. The local M- numbering system based on the old system applied to alternative trunk highways and motorways (That is: 1 → M1, 2 → M2, 4 → M4, 5 → M5).

The key highways are the following:

- Aleppo:
  - Route 214 (Gaziantep - Aleppo Highway): A 2/2 expressway running from Aleppo city to Turkish border between Azaz and Killis. The northern entrance of Aleppo city until the Carrefour mall has been recently rehabilitated, refurbishing the island median strip, placing new light posts and repairing sidewalks. The Jersey barrier that starts from Haritan will be rehabilitated, closing improper returns caused by random accidents and random returns created by the councils of the cities near the highway, causing multiple accidents. The route has 4 incomplete bridges.
  - Route 60 (Idlib - Aleppo): Runs from the Southern bypass ring as a complement. The route has a portion of M45 that ends in Urum Al-Sughra then navigates to Bab Al-Hawa. The route passes through Kafar Halab, Binnish, Idlib city and the western Idlib governate, ending ultimately in Salqin and connecting to Route 56. The portion between Khan Al-Asal and the Southern bypass ring has been expanded as a 2/2 lanes expressway with Jersey barrier median to connect to the southern bypass ring.
  - Southern bypass ring: Runs from M5 highway, passing through Al-Ramousah area and ending ultimately in Aleppo International Airport interchange. The highway has 3/3 lanes.
- Idlib:
  - M45 (Bab Al-Hawa - Tal Al-Karama, officially called Bab Al-Hawa - Aleppo): The first portion of M45 corridor before the M5 highway, running from Bab Al-Hawa to Tal Al-Karama passing through Sarmada roundabout. The highway between Bab Al-Hawa and Sarmada has been upgraded to 3/3 lanes expressway with island median since 2023. The highway has been upgraded into 2/2 lanes expressway since 2021. There are efforts to widen the highway in Tal Al-Karama and beyond to reduce the traffic congestion.
  - Route 420 (Bab Al-Hawa - Sarmada - Idlib): Runs from Sarmada to Idlib, passing through Hezzano and Maarrat Masrin and ultimately ending in the northern interchange of Idlib city. The route has been upgraded since 2022 to become a 2/2 (Sarmada - Hezzano) to 3/3 (Hezzano - Idlib) lanes with Jersey barrier as a median from Sarmada to Hezzano and island median from Hezzano to Idlib. This highway is one of the successful highways in Syria, putting Idlib as a primary linkage between Bab Al-Hawa and the M5 highway and the best choice to depart from Bab Al-Hawa to Damascus and beyond, although M45 runs through Aleppo and not Idlib.
- Homs:
  - Route 42 (Homs - Raqqa): Runs from Homs city and passes through Salamyia, ending ultimately in Raqqa city.
  - M5 bypass ring: Runs from the northern entrance of Homs, interchanging with M1 motorway and ending with the rest of M5 highway. The maps still indicates that M5 highways passes through Homs city although the bypass is operational
- Damascus:
  - Route 2 (Al-Tanf - Damascus): Also known as Baghdad-Damascus Highway. Runs from Al-Tanf, on the border with Iraq and ultimately ends in the first northern interchange of Damascus. The route is a two-lane expressway and a part of M30
  - Al-Motahallik Al-Shamali (Northern bypass ring): Runs in the first northern interchange of Damascus and ends ultimately in the interchange between the ring and M2 motorway. The ring highway has 2/2 lanes with Jersey barrier as a median, supplied by light posts. The highway requires rehabilitation and maintenance.
  - Al-Motahallik Al-Janobi (Southern bypass ring): Runs in the second northern interchange of Damascus and ends ultimately in the interchange between the ring and Al-mazzeh autostrada. The ring highway has 4/4 lanes with median, supplied by light posts. The ring is primary for M5 motorway complement, having a detour to leave Damascus towards the Jordan border.

=== Developments ===
- 2022 – proposed east–west motorway between Syrian–Iraqi border (Abu Kamal) and Tartus through Homs.
- 2023 – proposed north–south motorway linking the Syrian-Turkish border in the north with the Syrian-Jordanian border in the south through Aleppo, Homs and Damascus.
- 2024 – Al-Rastan bridge has been bombed by the Syrian Air Forces during the liberation, the Syrian Civil Defense funded by the UNDP is repairing the bridge, replacing 10 of 14 affected girders. The maintenance will end in February 2026, delays are probable because of the weather conditions that affects the maintenance operation.
- 2025 – bridge 46 located in Latakia governate has been partially damaged by the remnants of the fallen Bashar Al-Assad regime, closing the motorway in July 2025 for undergoing maintenance and requiring a 6 kilometers detour passed through the old Aleppo-Latakia Road to reach the motorway again.
- 2026 – the bridges that forges through Euphrates River have been blown-up during the clashes between SDF and the Syrian army forces.

There are more secondary developments to be mentioned:

- Ministry of Transport has revived the motorway proposals to be under constructions later, discussing with the Islamic Development Bank to fund the projects.
- Ministry of Transport has recently checked the state of the roads in the northwestern area, specifying the following:
  - M10 – checked the state of the undergoing maintenance in the closed portion.
  - M45 – examined the incomplete Al-Tah bridge, the damaged Khan Sheikhoun bridge, the motorway quality between north Hama and Saraqib. (At the end of Saraqib, the motorway expands as a 3/3 lanes with Jersey barrier median, connecting Aleppo with Saraqib. See M5 Motorway article for more details)
  - Idlib - Saraqib trunk highway has been examined and pended to be maintained
  - Idlib - Al-Mastoumah - Ariha expressway (Route 60a) will be widened from a two-lane expressway into a four-lane expressway, decreasing the congestion and the traffic between the two cities. The expressway is important for linking Idlib and Bab Al-Hawa with M10.
- Damascus International Airport highway will be rehabilitated with the fund of Qatar UCC

== Waterways ==
Syria has approximately 900 km of rivers, and they are of minimal economic importance. Syria is divided into seven main water basins, and 16 major rivers and tributaries.

The Euphrates, the longest river in West Asia, flows across 710 kilometres (440 mi) of Syria, and is Syria's only navigable river. In 1974 the completion of the Taqba Dam on the Euphrates created Euphrates Lake, the largest lake in Syria.

== Pipelines ==
As of 2010, the pipeline network comprised 1,997 km dedicated to crude oil and 3,161 km for petroleum products. Major routes includes the Arab Gas Pipeline and the Kirkuk–Baniyas pipeline (out of use since 2003 US-led invasion of Iraq). Additionally, there is the Iran–Iraq–Syria pipeline project, a proposed pipeline supplying gas to Europe.

== Ports and harbors ==
Syria's primary port is located in Latakia, with additional ports at Baniyas, Jableh, and Tartus.

== Merchant marine ==
As of 2006, the merchant marine consisted of a total of 19 ships of 1,000 gross tonnage (GT) or more, with a combined capacity of 429,005 GT and 626,069 tonnes deadweight (DWT).

By type, the fleet included four bulk carriers, fourteen cargo ships, and one carrier.

== Airports ==
As of 2012, Syria had a total of 99 airports. The major airports are the Damascus International Airport, the Aleppo International Airport and the Latakia International Airport. Minor airports are the Deir ez-Zor Airport, the Qamishli International Airport, and the Palmyra Airport.

As of 2012, there were 29 airports with paved runways. Of these, five had runways over 3,047 metres (9,997 ft) in length, sixteen measured 2,438 metres (7,999 ft) to 3,047 metres (9,997 ft), three were 914 metres (2,999 ft) to 1,523 metres (4,997 ft), and five were under 914 metres (2,999 ft). In addition, the country had 70 airports with unpaved runways. Among them, one had a runway 1,524 metres (5,000 ft) to 2,437 metres (7,995 ft) meters long, fourteen measured 914 metres (2,999 ft) to 1,523 metres (4,997 ft), and fifty-five were under 914 metres (2,999 ft).

== See also ==
- Ministry of Transport (Syria)
- General Authority of Civil Aviation (Syria)
