= M4 motorway (Syria) =

Highway in northern Syria

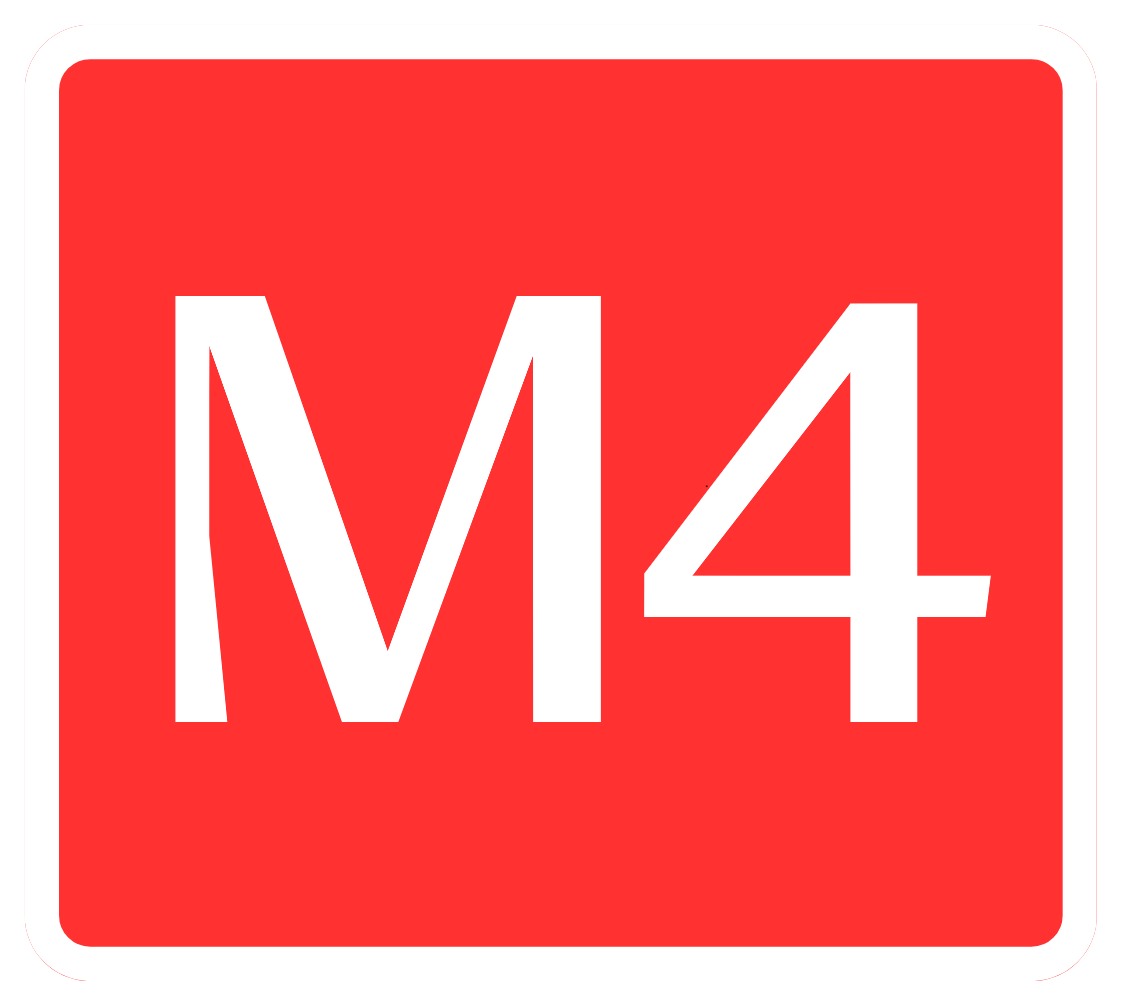
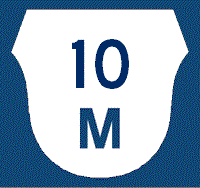
M4 Motorway
- M10 Corridor
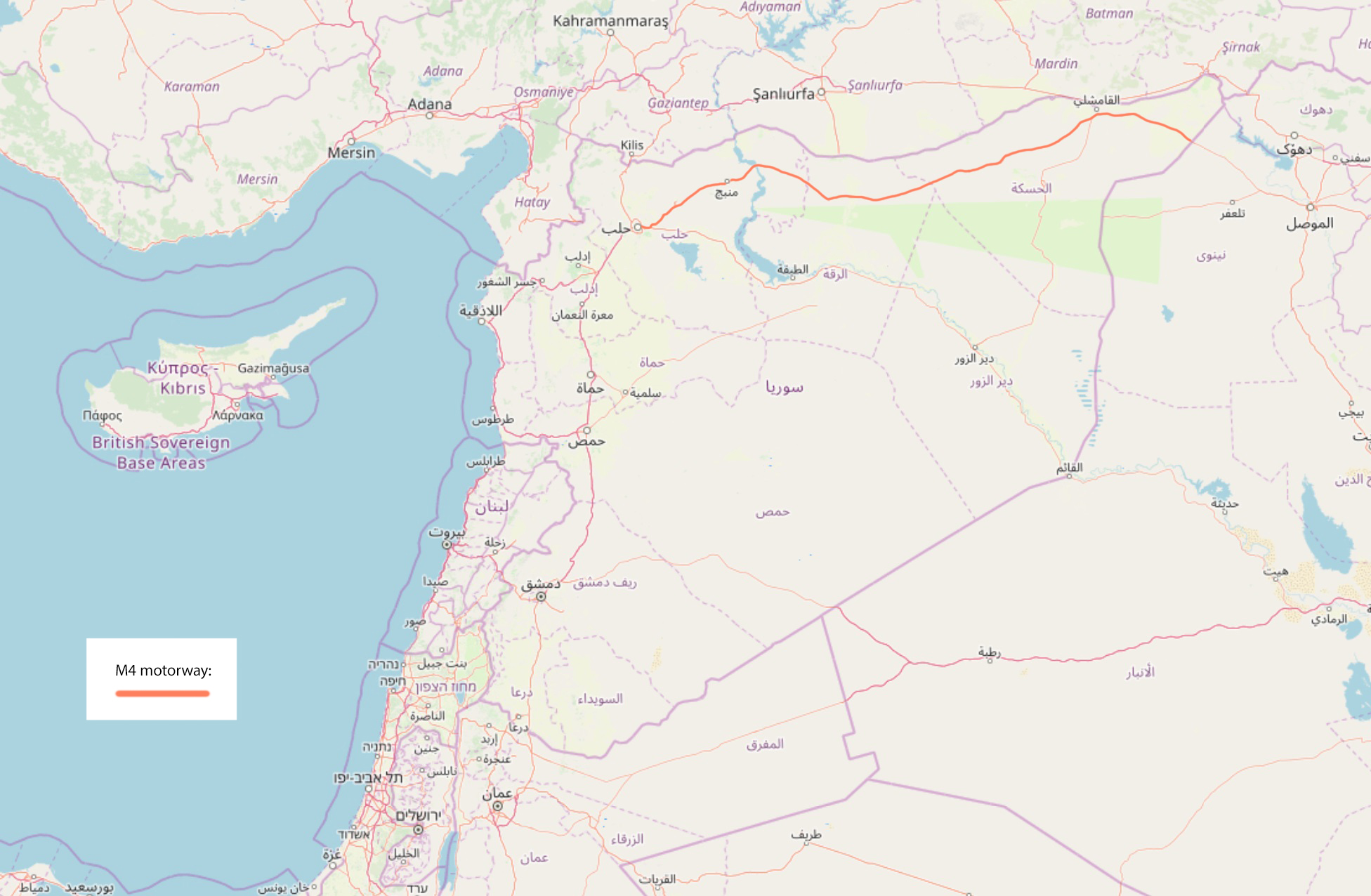

Route information
- Status: Partially operational (Bridges B46 to B50 are under maintenance)
- Existed: 2012–present

Major junctions
- From: Al-Yaarubiyah, Iraqi borders
- Tel Tamer, Manbij, Al-Bab, Aleppo, Saraqib, Arihah, Jisr al-Shughur
- To: Latakia

Location
- Country: Syria

Highway system
- Transport in Syria

The M4 motorway, newly called M10 by Ministry of Transport, is a highway in northern Syria, which runs almost parallel with its northern border with Turkey.

The M4 runs from Latakia to Saraqib, where it intersects with M5. It also connects Arihah and Jisr al-Shughur. Its length is 215 kilometres (134 mi). Assuming that it shares 43 km with the M5, it arrives until Aleppo, and from Al-Bab city, it has been expanded as a two-lane expressway that continues further east into the Iraqi border, ultimately reaching its destination at Mosul.

The motorway is a significant part of M10, which is an Arab Mashreq International Road Network corridor, connecting the eastern major cities and overland travelers from eastern countries like Iraq to the Mediterranean Sea. The motorway designation issue is the same as M5 motorway designation case, but M4 motorway is designated as M10 according to Arab Mashreq International Road Network agreement.

== Technical Specifications ==
The road begins at the Al-Yaarubiyah border crossing as a two-lane expressway. In some towns and villages, it is divided by a median strip. The M4 crosses the Qara Qozak Bridge and continues towards important cities as a two-lane expressway, such as Manbij and Al-Bab (Aleppo). Upon reaching Al-Bab city, the road becomes 4-lanes expressway, divided by a Jersey barrier until it intersects with Aleppo - Raqqa Road, designated M15. Travelers can exit Aleppo via the eastern Aleppo Bypass Motorway, to reach the M5 Motorway. Here, the road is divided into three lanes in each direction, divided by a Jersey barrier, until Saraqib. The M4 then continues as a dual carriageway, divided by a median strip, until Ariha.

Here, beyond the Ariha Bridge, the Jersey barrier marks the western edge of the city. This portion of the highway, constructed in 2008 and opened to public in 2011 by the Kuwaiti Al-Kharafi company in cooperation with the Syrian Ministry of Transport to very high international standards, ends at the Al-Bassa interchange in Latakia, where it intersects with the M1 highway. This section of the road has three lanes in each direction, bisected by a tall, cast-in-place Jersey barrier. These specifications allow for a high speed of up to 130 kilometers per hour. The road also includes numerous bridges connecting it to several cities and villages, such as Jisr al-Shughur, Salanfah, Al-Haffah and others.

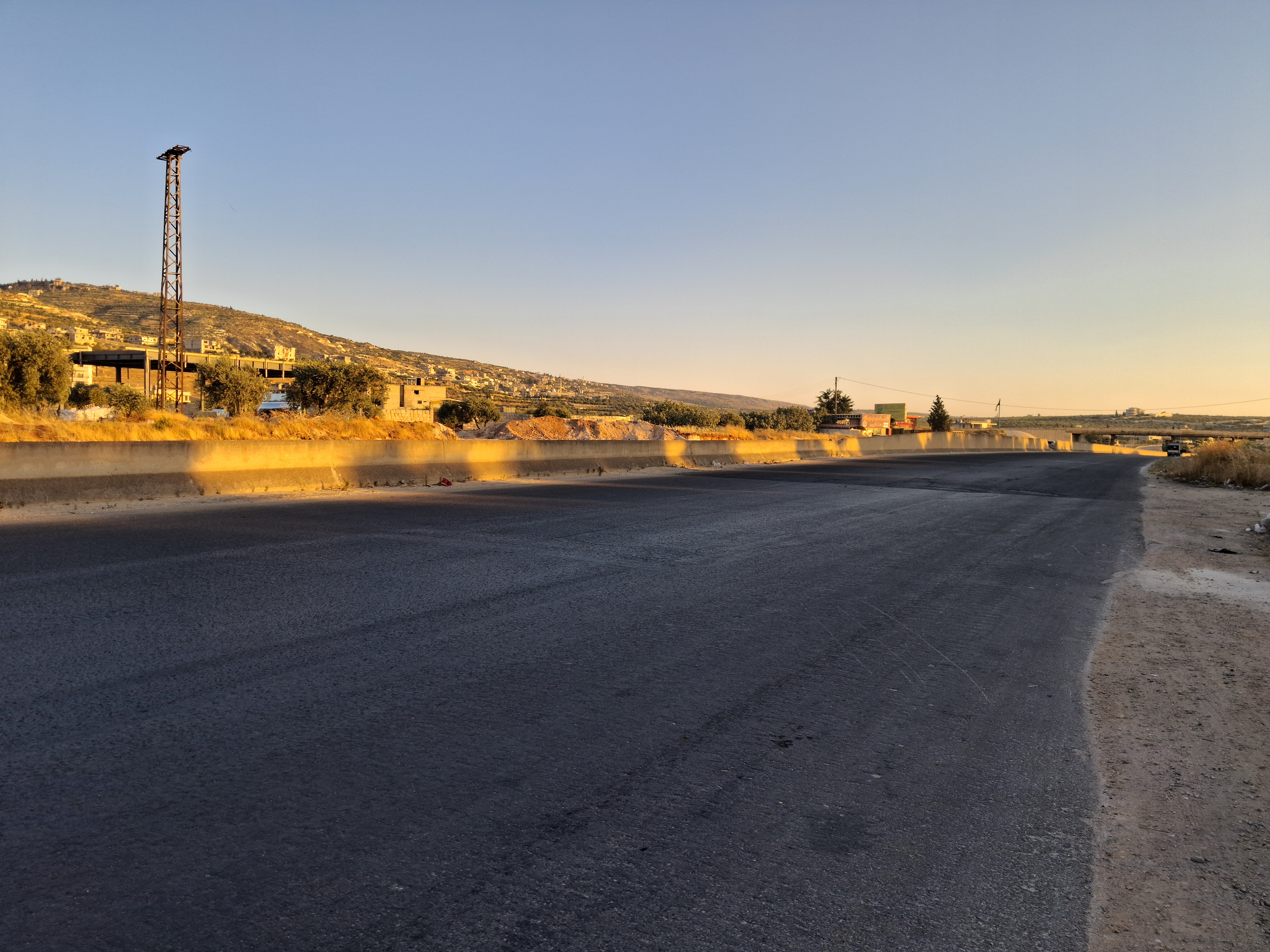
M10 motorway outside Ariha city area, where the motorway connects to the recently constructed section and Jersey barrier becomes taller until reaching at most 150 centimeters height.

== Challenges face the motorway ==
On 25 May 2020, the highway was reopened for the first time in seven months since October 2019 in northeastern Syria, after Russian mediation to reopen parts of the road captured last year by opposition fighters.

In July 2025, the highway in Latakia governate was closed for maintaining 6 kilometers of the highway and repairing bridges, such as B46, which damaged by the remnants of the fallen Ba'athist regime.

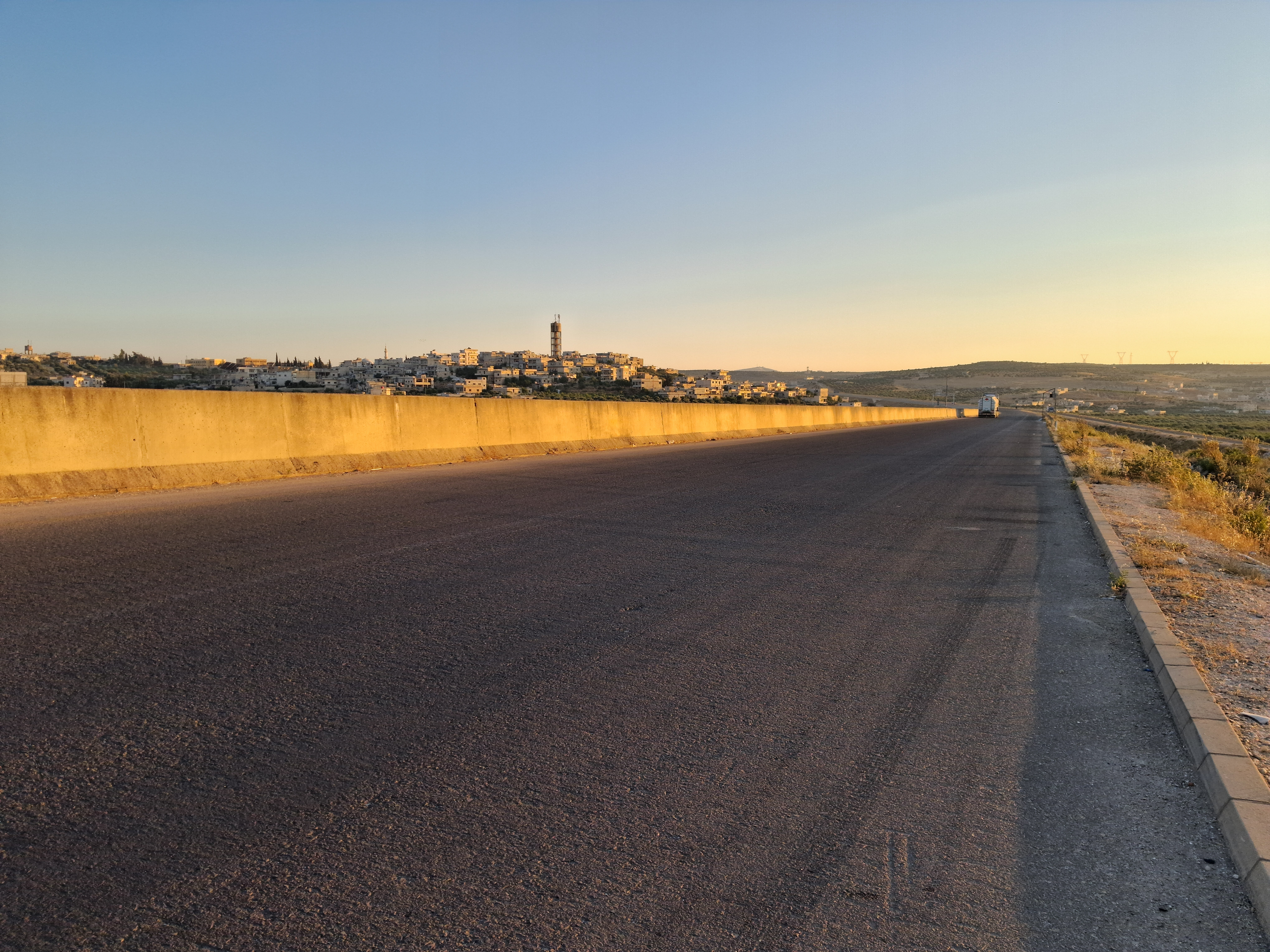
M10 Motorway near Urum Al-Jouz village. Ariha - Latakia motorway is constructed by Kwaiti Al-Kharafi construction company. The motorway has four to six lanes in total divided by tall cast Jersey barrier.

After the victory of the Syrian revolution, remnants of the former regime damaged the road, blowing up sections of it and some bridges, including Bridge B46, which was rendered unusable, along with a section of the highway it crossed. As a result, the Ministry of Transport closed this section, forcing travelers to use a detour on the old Aleppo - Latakia Road (Route 4 according to the old Syrian Road Numbering System), a 6-kilometer stretch.

On January 20, 2026, the Minister of Transport, Engineer Yaarub Bader, visited the closed section of the motorway, which was being repaired by the contracting companies and the General Authority for Road Transport. He targeted to reopen the motorway, at least partially, before the start of the tourist season in Syria.

Since March 2026, Syrian authorities reopened the road linking Syria's business and industrial capital of Aleppo with eastern areas under the control of Kurdish-led SDF, sources said. This step constitutes the incorporation of the areas controlled by the Syrian Democratic Forces into state control, following the conclusion of an integration agreement between the two sides.

== See also ==
- Transport in Syria
- M5 Motorway
