= Road to Damascus (disambiguation) =

The Road to Damascus most commonly refers to the Conversion of Paul the Apostle

It may also refer to:

- "The Road to Damascus", episode 12 of Season 1 of the 2011 TV series Superbook
- M5 motorway (Syria), a road that runs from Aleppo to the Syrian-Jordanian border through Damascus
- M30 (Mashreq), a road that is part of the Arab Mashreq International Road Network that runs from Beirut to Ar-Rutbah (in Iraq), through Damascus
