= Saddam al-Jamal =

Syrian Islamic State militant

- صدام الجمل
- Born: Saddam Omar Yahya al-Jamal صدام عمر يحيى الجمل; 1987 (age 38–39); Abu Kamal, Syria
- Years active: 2011–2018

Saddam Omar al-Jamal (Arabic: صدام عمر الجمل; born 1987) also known as Abu Ruqayya al-Ansari (Arabic: أبو رقية الأنصاري) is a Syrian jihadist militant of the Islamic State. He is known for taking part in the 2014 massacres of the Al-Shaitat tribe and for his involvement in the death of Jordanian fighter pilot Muath Al-Kasasbeh.

== Career ==
=== Free Syrian Army ===
He originally led the Allahu Akbar Brigade, a faction of the Free Syrian Army operating in the Deir ez-Zor Governorate with over 800 fighters. According to Al-Jazeera, "Jamal was not only the leader of a battalion but also a top FSA commander for the whole of Syria's eastern region encompassing the Deir ez-Zor Governorate." He led the Eastern Front of the Supreme Military Council (Syria). The "Allahu Akbar Brigade" was a component of the Ahfad al-Rasul Brigades.

=== Islamic State ===
On 16 December 2013, he appeared in a video titled Revealing the biggest conspiracy targeting the Islamic State, in which he announced that he had joined the Islamic State.

The degree to which his decision to join the Islamic State was voluntary is disputed. Some characterize his defection as a form of "surrender" to the Islamic State after two of his brothers were abducted, his brother's house was bombed, and several of his combatants were killed. During this period, Jamal narrowly evaded an assassination attempt when a man detonated himself at his headquarters. Jamal established an Islamic State bank branch.

From 2014 onwards, he served as the Islamic State emir for Abu Kamal, Syria, which is his hometown.

In September 2015, he was reportedly appointed as a deputy to Abu Firas al-Iraqi, the governor of the Islamic State Euphrates province located on the border between Iraq and Syria.

Saddam al-Jamal and four other ISIS commanders were apprehended on 9 May 2018 during a cross-border operation by Iraqi forces into Al-Bukamal near the Syria-Iraq border.
