= Ahfad al-Rasul Brigades =

Qatari-backed Syrian rebel group (2012–2014)

- ألوية أحفاد الرسول
- Official logo of the Ahfad al-Rasul Brigades
- Leaders: Col. Ziad Haj Obaid (until September 2013); Saddam al-Jamal (until November 2013); Abu Mazin †
- Dates active: July 2012–late 2013/early 2014
- Active regions: Syria: Idlib Governorate; Aleppo Governorate; Latakia Governorate; Raqqa Governorate; Hasakah Governorate; Rif Dimashq Governorate; Damascus Governorate; Daraa Governorate; Quneitra Governorate; Deir ez-Zor Governorate
- Ideology: Sunni Islamism; Salafist jihadism (factions)
- Size: 7,000–9,000
- Part of: Free Syrian Army: Tajamu' Ansar al-Islam (2012-2013); Euphrates Islamic Liberation Front (2014)
- Wars: Syrian civil war

The Ahfad al-Rasul Brigades (Arabic: ألوية أحفاد الرسول Al-wiat Aḥfād ar-Rasūl, "Grandsons of the Prophet Brigades") was a Syrian rebel group fighting against the Syrian government in the Syrian Civil War. It was funded by the Qatari government.

== Structure and member groups ==
Its notable subgroups included the Justice Battalion, the Golan Martyrs Battalion, the Golan Hawks Battalion, the Falcons of Mount Zawiya Brigade, and the Qalamoun Liberation Front. By August 2013, the group had coopted some 50 groups from across Syria; however, it was strongest in Idlib Governorate. Its leader, Colonel Ziad Haj Obaid, was on the Arms Committee of the Supreme Military Council. The Allahu Akbar Brigade, based in al-Bukamal in the Deir ez-Zor Governorate, was also part of Ahfad al-Rasul. In July 2013, Al Jazeera reported that the Allahu Akbar Brigade consisted of around 800 fighters.

== History ==
On 11 October 2012, the Ahfad al-Rasul Brigades, in coordination with Ansar al-Islam, conducted a bombing of Syrian military compounds west of the Umayyad Square in Damascus.

In December 2012, the Ahfad al-Rasul Brigades executed a Syrian Army officer on allegations of heresy. By this time, the group was described as a Salafist jihadist group independent from the Free Syrian Army.

In July 2013, the Ahfad al-Rasul Brigades, along with Ahrar al-Sham and the Kurdish Islamic Front, announced that they would fight alongside al-Qaeda's al-Nusra Front against the People's Protection Units (YPG) in northern Syria.

In August 2013, clashes erupted between the Ahfad al-Rasul Brigades and the Islamic State of Iraq and the Levant in the city of Raqqa. On 13 August, ISIL suicide bombers detonated 4 car bombs at the Ahfad al-Rasul Brigades' headquarters at the Raqqa train station, killing 6 Ahfad al-Rasul fighters, including two commanders, Abu Mazin and Fahd al-Kajwan, and 6 civilians. By the next day, ISIL fighters fully captured the headquarter. Clashes also erupted in Tabqa. By 17 August, ISIL had defeated Ahfad al-Rasul in Raqqa and expelled it from the city. During the conflict between ISIL and the Ahfad al-Rasul Brigades in Raqqa, the group organized protests against both ISIL and Ahrar al-Sham, and viewed Ahrar al-Sham as allowing ISIL to defeat the group due to their lack of intervention in the conflict, while Ahrar al-Sham also shared the view of ISIL, of the Ahfad al-Rasul Brigades as being a common enemy. However, the Ahfad al-Rasul Brigades announced an end to its conflict with ISIL on 17 August, and resumed cooperation with it.

The fighting soon spread to the Deir ez-Zor Governorate, and tensions also rose between Ahfad al-Rasul and the al-Nusra Front. In November 2013, Saddam al-Jamal, commander of Ahfad al-Rasul's Allahu Akbar Brigade, defected to ISIL. Following al-Jamal's defection, 4 subunits of Ahfad al-Rasul also defected to ISIL.

By early 2014, the Ahfad al-Rasul Brigades was described as defunct, with many subunits rebranding themselves as members of the Syrian Revolutionaries Front. The Latakia Governorate-based Brigade of the Chargers, formerly part of Ahfad al-Rasul, received BGM-71 TOW anti-tank missiles in early 2014, and became the 1st Coastal Division in late 2014. Reports appeared in early 2017 that possible remnants of the Ahfad al-Rasul Brigades have reappeared as the Army of Grandsons in the northern Aleppo Governorate to fight ISIL as part of Operation Euphrates Shield.

== See also ==
- List of armed groups in the Syrian Civil War
