= M5 motorway (Syria) =

Most important road in Syria

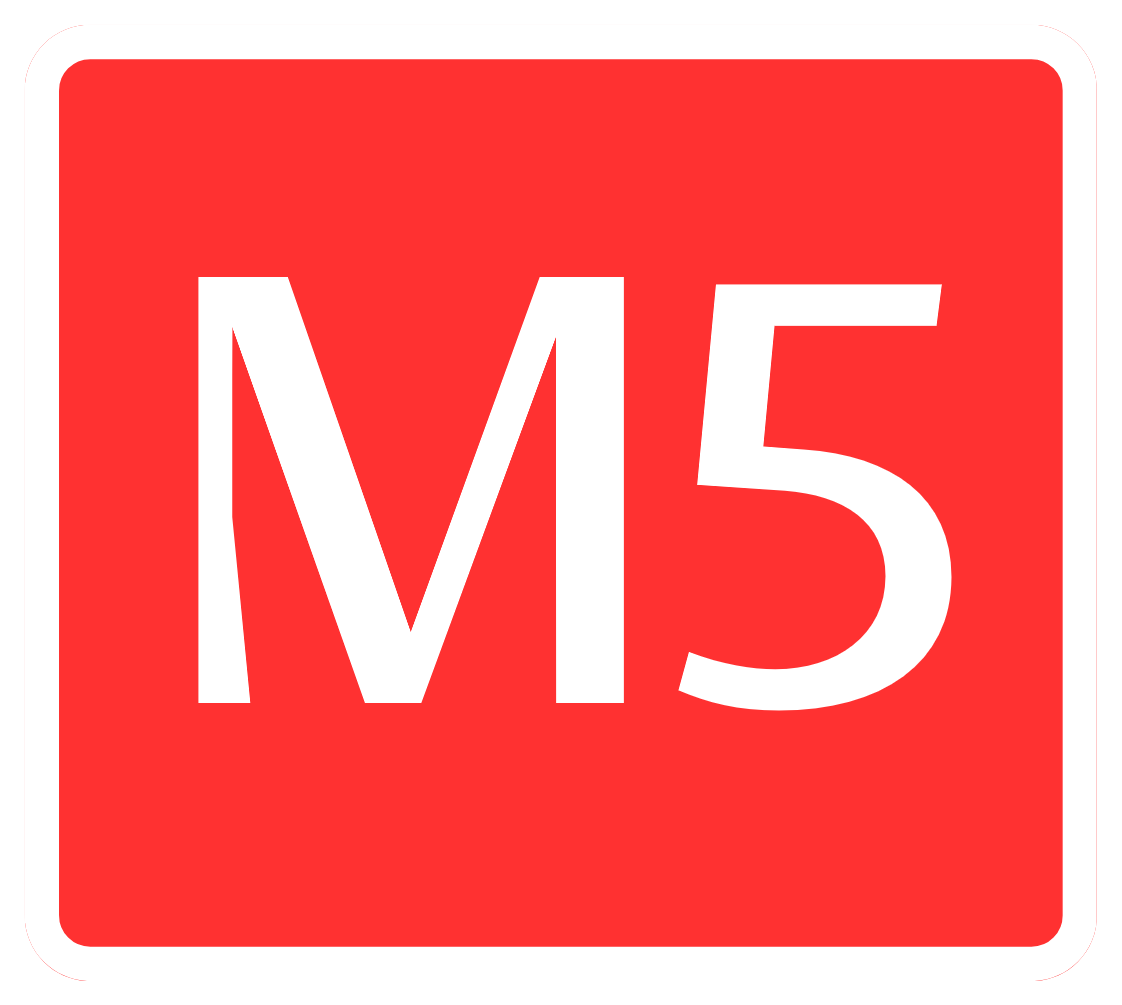
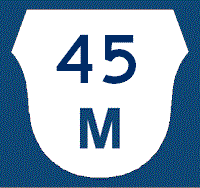
M5 Motorway

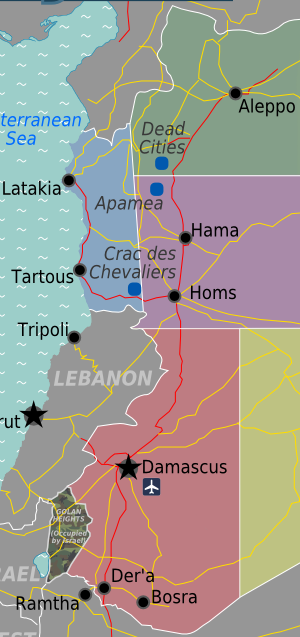

Route information
- Length: 450 km (280 mi)
- Status: Operational

Major junctions
- From: Border with Jordan (Highway 15)
- To: Bab al-Hawa Border Crossing, North of Idleb

Location
- Country: Syria

Highway system
- Transport in Syria

The M5 motorway, newly called as M45 by Ministry of Transport, is the most important motorway in Syria due to its length and function as the country network's south-north backbone. It is known as the "International Road." It connects the border with Jordan in the south with Damascus, the country's political capital, and continues further north through Aleppo, the country's economic capital and second largest city, to the border with Turkey in the north.

Other cities connected by this motorway are Daraa, Al Nabk, Homs and Hama. Its length is 450 kilometres (280 mi). It intersects with the M4 motorway near Saraqib, which is the main highway from Aleppo to the port of Latakia running parallel to the border with Turkey.

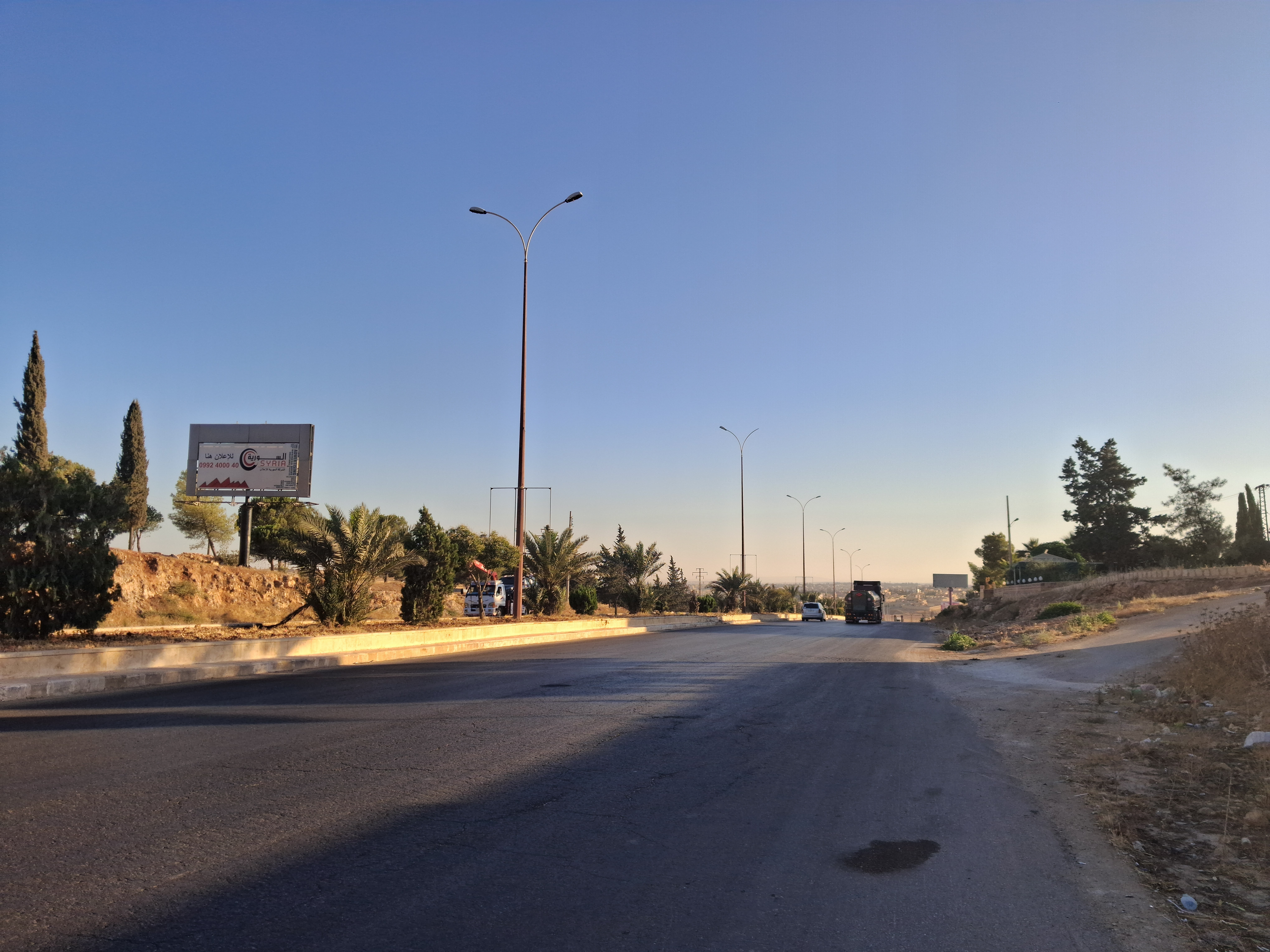
The entrance to the city of Aleppo from the M5 motorway. This section features two lanes in each direction, separated by a curbed median strip with arched-arm streetlight poles.

The motorway is a significant part of M45, which is an Arab Mashreq International Road Network corridor, connecting Aleppo, Idlib, Hama, Homs, Damascus and Daraa with Mekkah and Madina, making the main single corridor for overland Muslim passengers for pilgrimage.

== Is it M5 or M45?! ==
When Ministry of Transport had announced motorway rehabilitation, the Syrian people found it strange because M- system is defined by map services but acknowledgeable by map users. The number M5 was introduced after upgrading the road into a dual carriageway and setting the primal number 5 as a road number.

The northern section of M45 corridor in Aleppo and the north of Idlib is not a motorway, because this section was neglected and never completely upgraded until nowadays, causing traffic congestions in that section. Therefore, M5 actually starts from Aleppo city, not from Bab Al-Hawa.

However, according to Arab Mashreq International Road Network agreement, assigning overlapping numbers are not allowed: "The routes of the Arab Mashreq international road network are designated by the letter M followed by the road number. For this reason, one must make certain that this symbol is not used to identify roads in accordance with the national numbering system." (page 30). Public Establishment of Road Communication determined only Arab Mashreq routes instead of the old numbers. Therefore, M5 is an invalid road numbering and M- numbering system must be deprecated and changed.

=== The old numbering system ===
Since 1950s, there were nine national routes ordered in ascend, including the most important Route 5. These routes were single carriageway routes and passes through the major cities and towns. When the route had been upgraded into a motorway eventually, the number 5 deprecated and became M5 (Motorway 5), passing through five governorates: Aleppo, Hama, Homs, Damascus and Daraa. Idlib was neglected by the fallen regime and not counted as a major city in that time.

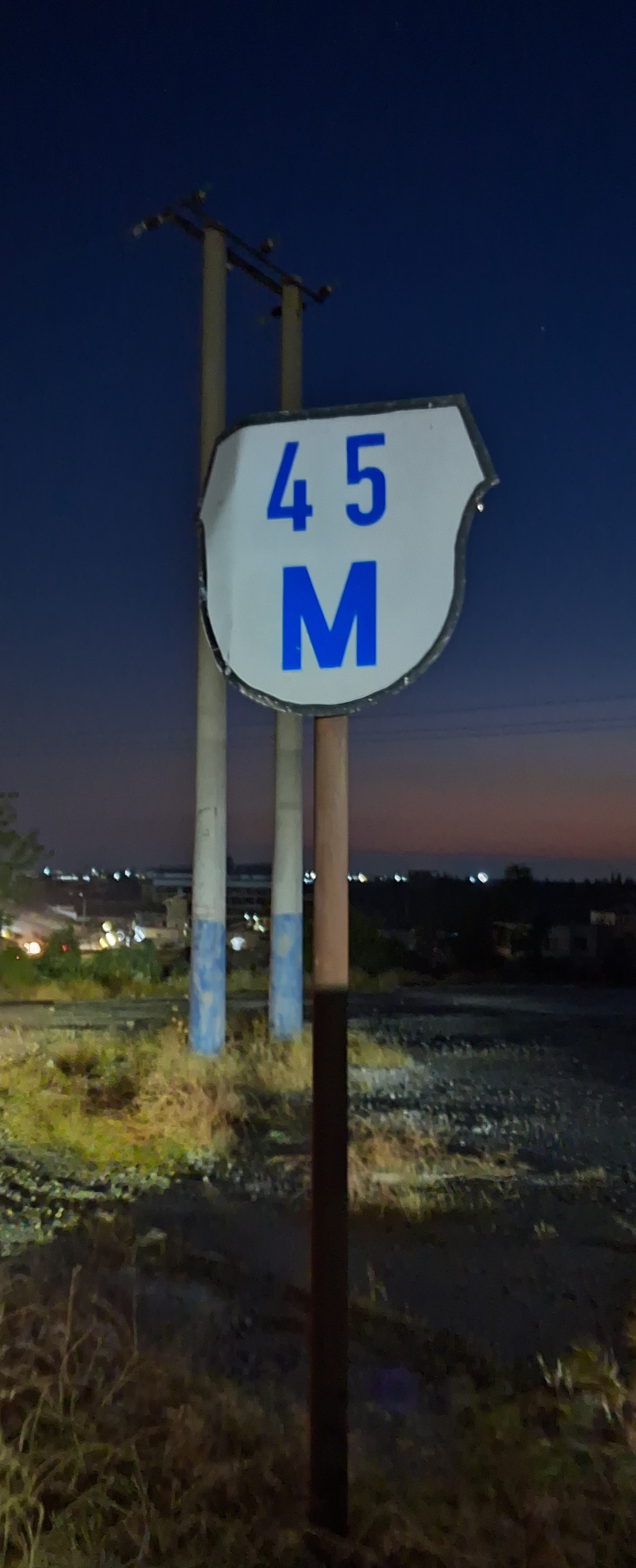
M45 road sign found in Aleppo - Bab Al-Hawa Road. This Mashreq sign is the only existent sign in all Aleppo governorate. Syrian Google Maps did not acknowledge the corridor path due to country restrictions.

=== Conclusion ===
M5 is not an official designation and cannot be removed either from services like Google Maps, leading the people to determine the designation and the M4 designation being utilized by official news media. The motorway is a part of M45 because the northmost part of the corridor is not a motorway. M45 is official by the international agreement and the Syrian government. But most Arab Mashreq road signs are missing or stolen, leaving the motorway without a clear numbering.

== History ==
=== Syrian civil war ===
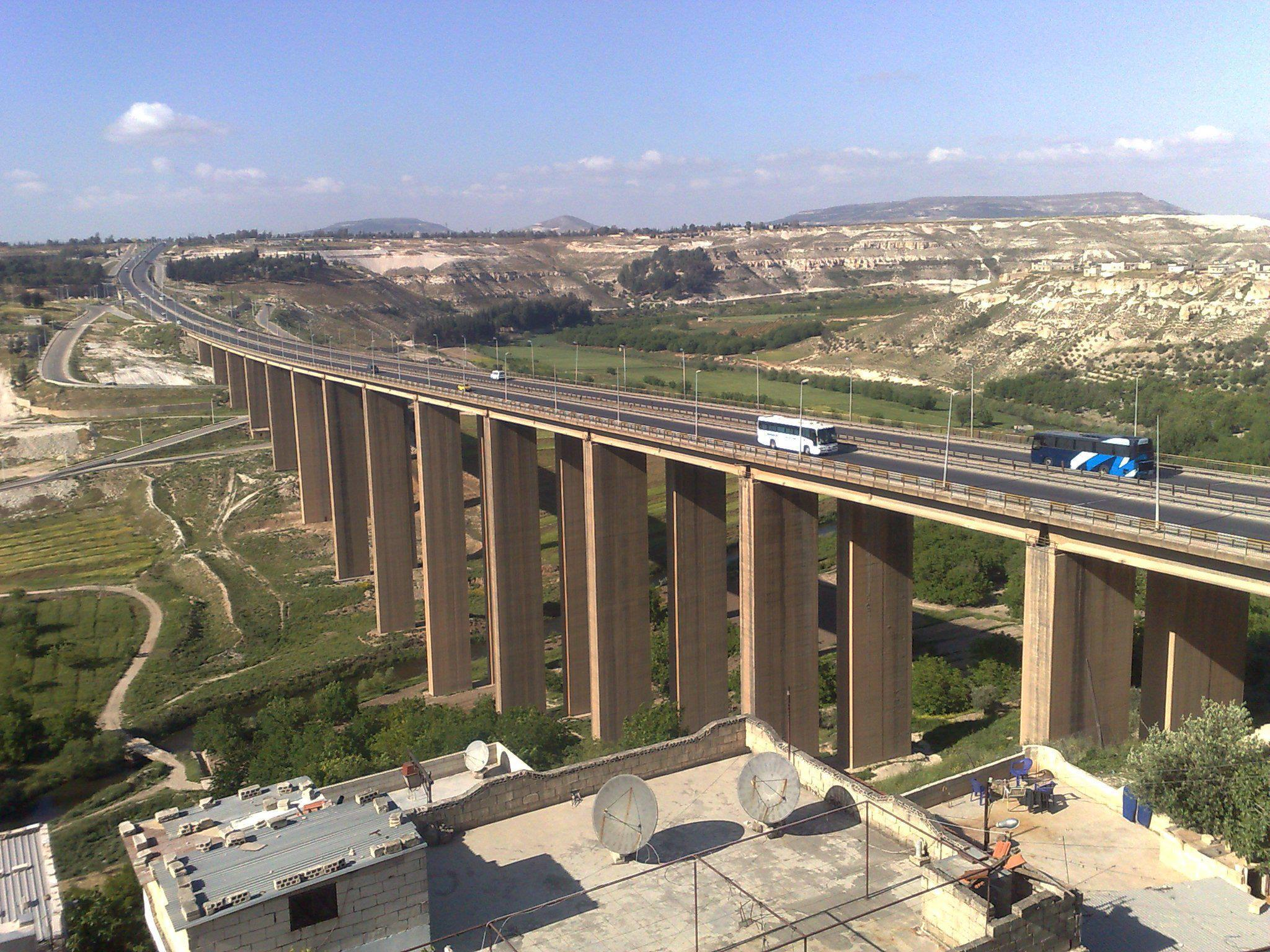
Al-Rastan bridge of M5 motorway

Parts of the M5 have been in the control of various rebel groups in the Syrian Civil War since 2012.

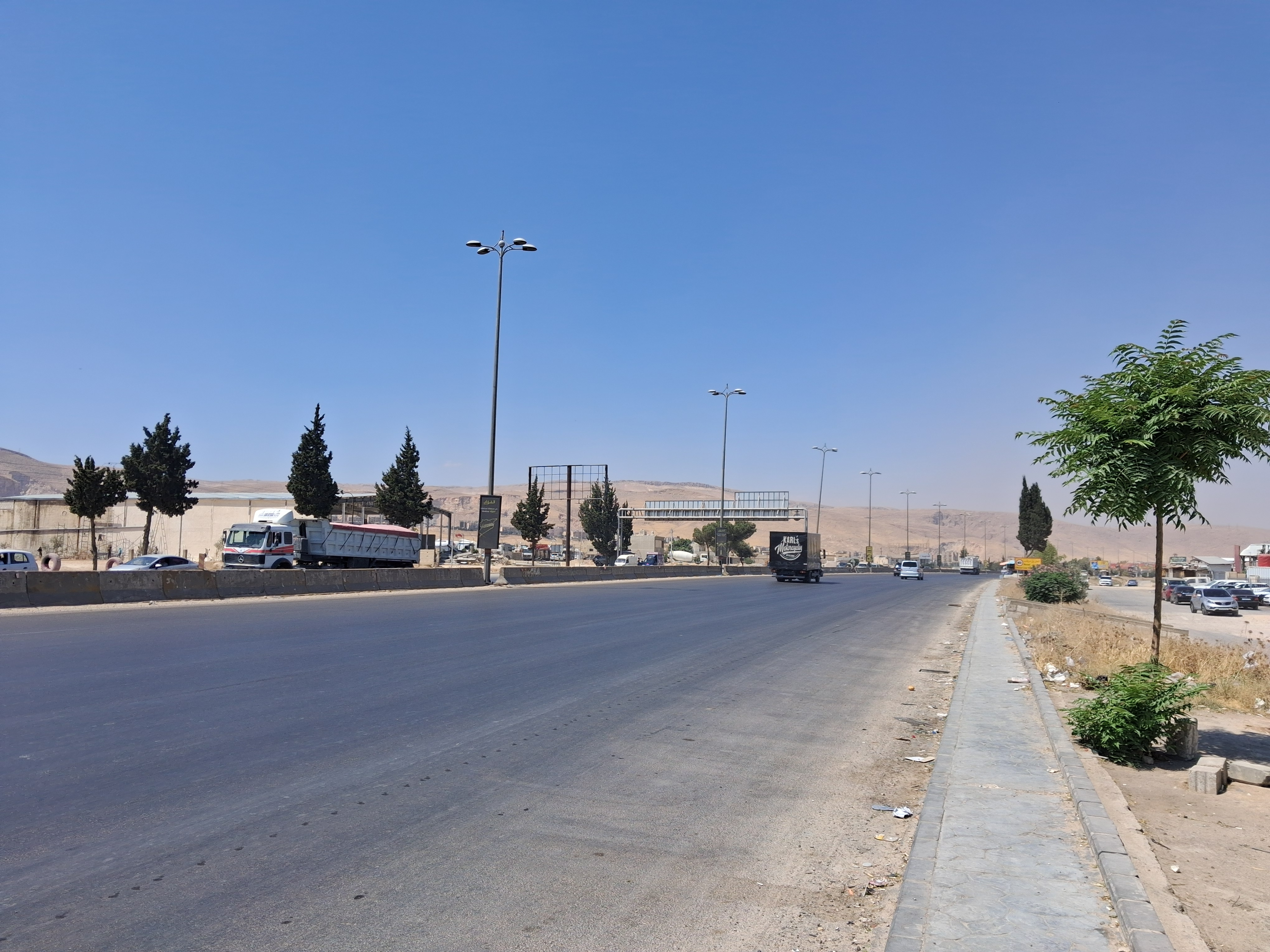
The northern entrance from M45 motorway to Damascus. The motorway has eight lanes divided by Jersey barrier and streetlight poles with four light heads each pole.

In October 2019, the north of the highway became a warzone, as Turkish-backed Syrian rebel forces advanced into the Kurdish-controlled region of Rojava. Civilians had been killed near the motorway. Turkish media also reported that it was the goal of Turkey's Operation Peace Spring to reach the M4 junction with the M5 in the Syrian opposition area.

On 14 February 2020, the Syrian Army recaptured the M5 motorway fully for the first time since 2012 before opposition factions and Turkish forces recaptured Saraqib by 26 February and cut the highway once again on 27 February. On 1 March, Saraqib was back under Syrian Army control and also regained control of the entire motorway by 3 March.

On 8 March 2020, the M5 highway was reopened for civilian use.

On 28 November 2024, the M5 highway was cut off during the Northwestern Syria offensive by opposition groups.

=== Post-war events ===
Since 2026, there are major tenders to rehabilitate M5 (M45) completely within 500 days. This is a significant decision held by Ministry of Transport under the new Syrian government.

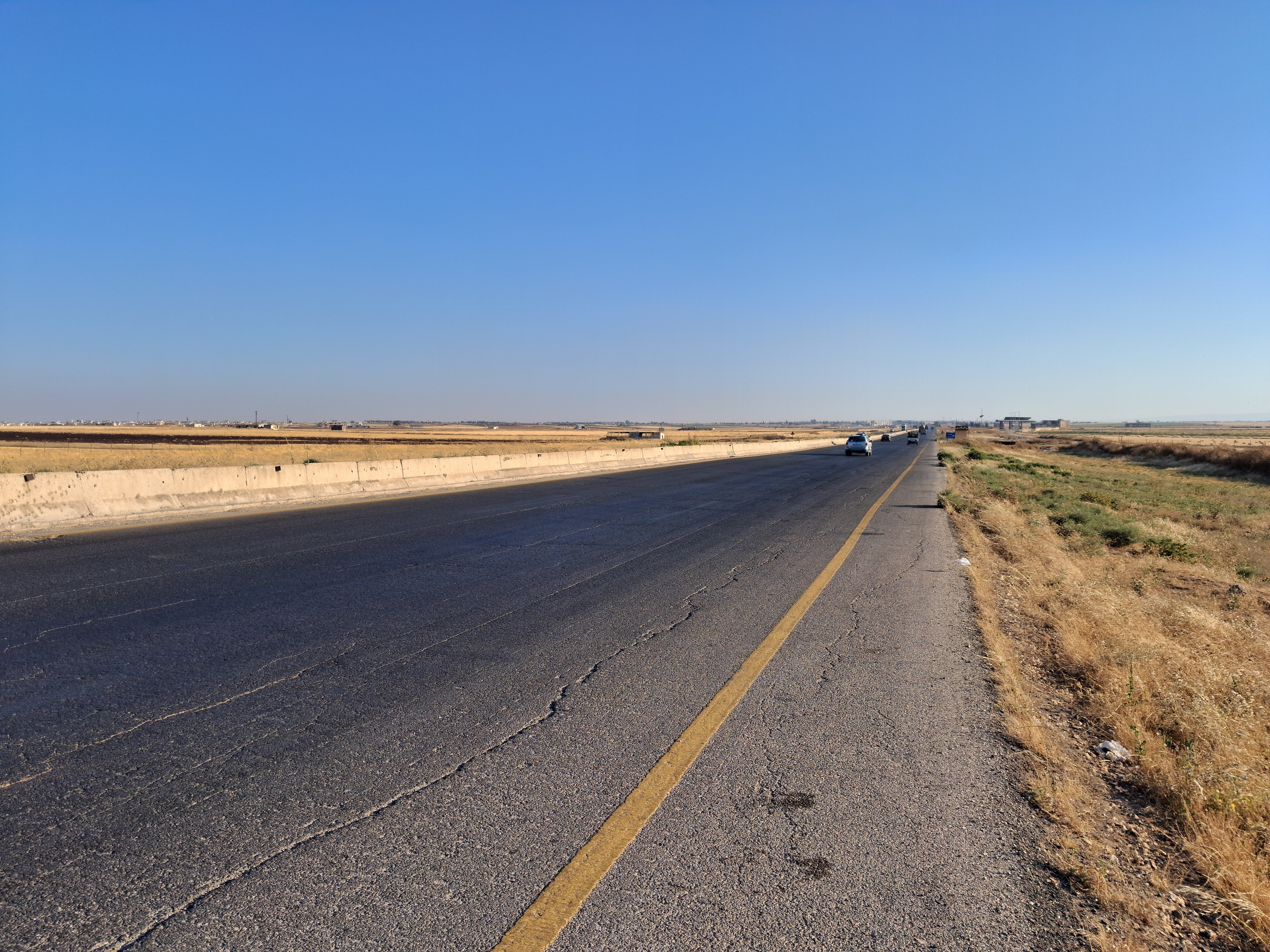
M5 motorway in Kaseeba, Aleppo governorate. This section is a dual carriageway separated by Jersey barrier.

== See also ==
- Transport in Syria
