= M1 motorway (Syria) =

Highway in western Syria

M1 Motorway

Route information
- Length: 174 km (108 mi)

Major junctions
- From: Eastern Latakia
- To: Western Homs

Location
- Country: Syria

Highway system
- Transport in Syria

The M1 motorway is a major motorway in western Syria.

The highway begins at Latakia on Syria's Mediterranean coast, then travels south along the coast, before travelling East near the Syria-Lebanon border. The highway ends in the city of Homs, where it meets the M5 Motorway.

The road has great economic and logistical importance as it connects the major ports of Latakia and Tartus on the Syrian coast to the M5 Motorway that connect most of the country's major cities, including the capital of Damascus.

Since the fall of the Assad regime and the start of the Assadist insurgency in December 2024, there have been clashes in regions along the M1 Motorway.
