= Al-Qa'im (town) =

Town in al-Anbar Province, Iraq

Al-Qa'im القائم
- Border town
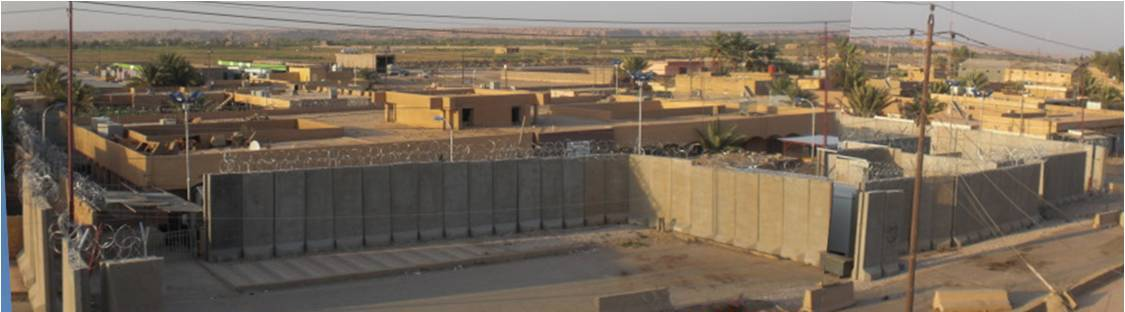
- View of al-Qa'im, 2009
- Interactive map of Al-Qa'im
- Location of Al-Qa'im in Iraq
- Coordinates: 34°22′7.66″N 41°5′40.10″E
- Country: Iraq
- Province: Al-Anbar
- District: Al-Qa'im District
- Elevation: 175 m (574 ft)

Population (2018)
  - Total: 74,100
- Time zone: UTC+3 (GMT+3)
- Postal code: 31003

Al-Qa'im (Arabic: القائم) is an Iraqi border town located nearly 400 km (248 mi) northwest of Baghdad near the Syrian border and situated along the Euphrates River, and located in the Al Anbar Governorate. It has a population of about 74,100 and it's the center of the Al-Qa'im District.

The Al-Qa'im border crossing connects Al-Qaim to close city Abu Kamal in Syria.

== Geography ==
Al-Qa'im lies on the Euphrates River in the western desert of Al Anbar Governorate, near Iraq's border with Syria. More broadly, Iraq's river floodplains including stretches of the Euphrates support irrigated cultivation amid the desert plateau that covers much of the country's west, with population and agriculture concentrated along the river corridors rather than the surrounding steppe.

The Akashat phosphate deposit, one of the larger phosphate reserves in the Middle East, lies roughly 100 km west of the town, near Ar-Rutba District. The town has an elevation of about 175 m.

The Akashat phosphate deposit, one of the larger phosphate reserves in the Middle East, lies roughly 100 km west of the town, near Ar-Rutba District. The town has an elevation of about 175 m.

== Economy ==
Since the 1970s, Al-Qa'im's economy has centered on phosphate mining and fertilizer manufacturing. Phosphate rock extracted at the Akashat mine is processed at the Al-Qa'im Fertilizers Complex into sulfuric acid, phosphoric acid, and phosphate fertilizers, including triple superphosphate (TSP) and compound NPK blends. Construction of the complex began under a 1976 contract with a Belgian firm, and ore from Akashat first reached the plant's concentration unit in the second half of 1982. The same industrial complex also housed a small uranium-extraction facility connected to Iraq's pre-1991 nuclear program, which was destroyed by coalition airstrikes during the 1991 Gulf War.

Phosphate output declined sharply under the international sanctions of the 1990s and was further disrupted after 2003; production at both Akashat and the Al-Qa'im complex was effectively halted after the 2003 invasion and suffered additional damage during the Islamic State occupation and the campaign to retake the area. Iraq's Ministry of Industry and Minerals has since sought private and foreign investment to rehabilitate the Akashat–Al-Qa'im phosphate chain, though bureaucratic obstacles and lingering security concerns have slowed progress.

Alongside industry, the Euphrates floodplain around the town supports date palm groves and irrigated vegetable farming.

== Infrastructure ==
Al-Qa'im is connected to Baghdad and other towns in Al Anbar Governorate by road along the Euphrates valley. At Husaybah, on the western edge of Al-Qa'im District, the Al-Qa'im border crossing links the town to Abu Kamal in Syria's Deir ez-Zor Governorate. The crossing was closed for roughly eight years during the Syrian Civil War and the Iraqi Civil War before reopening on 30 September 2019.

A branch railway, part of a Baghdad–Al-Qa'im–Akashat line planned in the 1970s–80s to connect the phosphate and fertilizer production complex to Iraqi ports at Basra, historically linked the Akashat mine to the Al-Qa'im fertilizer complex. Iraq's national rail network as a whole sustained roughly US$1 billion in war-, sanctions-, and looting-related damage between 1980 and 2003, and the Baghdad-facing section of this line was among the routes affected by the broader disrepair of Iraqi Republic Railways infrastructure in the decades since.

== Pre-war history ==
In the early 20th century, there was a khan (caravanserai) and police station in Al-Qa'im, but no village. The khan was built in 1907, during the latter years of Ottoman Iraq, and was the residence of a local administrator. The surrounding area was inhabited by Bedouin Arabs from the Karablah and Jara'if tribes.

== Iraq War ==
In the Iraq War, Qa'im was a center of attacks by the Iraqi insurgents against US military personnel at the nearby military base of Camp Gannon. The U.S. military regarded Qa'im as the entry point for foreign fighters into Iraq and viewed it as a strategically important point.

It was reported by Newsweek in 2003 that American soldiers stationed in the border city entered Syria. During the 3rd Armored Cavalry Regiment's control, a photojournalist embedded to the unit documented the city's events, and his photos were used in Time and Newsweek. A more candid article titled "Iraq's a Wild West" appeared in the September 2003 issue of Maxim. In November 2003, the 3rd Cavalry conducted the highly successful and largely peaceful Operation Rifles Blitz. During the operation the city was sectioned into three portions and searched house-to-house over a two-week period. Large numbers of weapons and suspected insurgents were captured during the operation, but some ill will was earned during the operation since it prevented Ramadan celebrations from taking place that year.

In March 2004, the 3rd ACR conducted a turnover with the 3rd Battalion, 7th Marines (3/7) of the 1st Marine Division. 3/7 served in Al-Qa'im from March until September 2004. Shortly after the turnover was complete, the enemy launched a sustained offensive throughout the country, attempting to take advantage of the relative inexperience of the new force. This would become a common tactic as the war continued, but caught many units by surprise that spring.

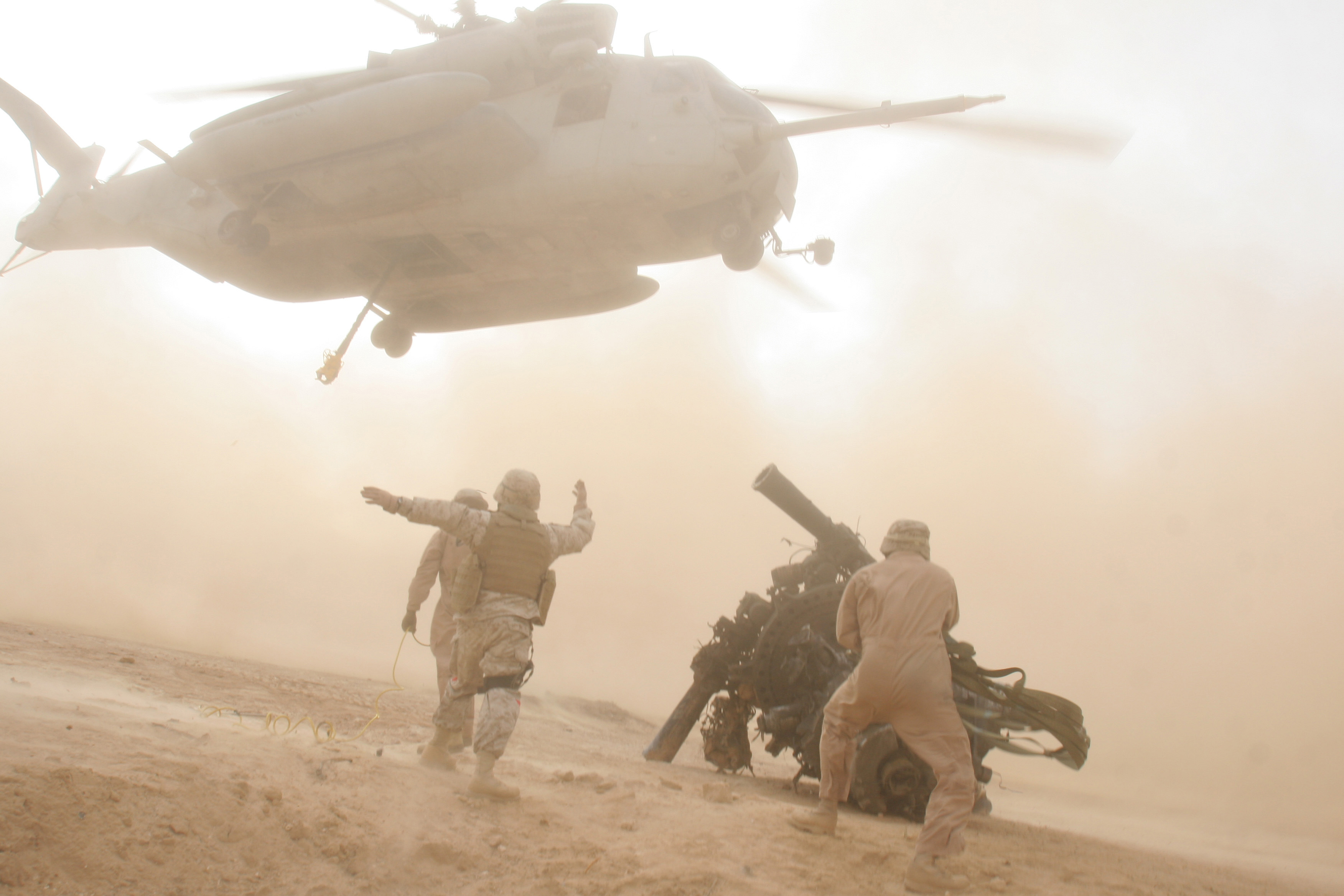
U.S. Marines direct the crew of a CH-53E Super Stallion helicopter as it prepares to pick up a rotor head from a downed CH-53E near Al-Qa'im, Dec. 15, 2006.

In Al-Qa'im, the activity heated up during April 2004 until the day of the battalion's pivotal battle on April 17. Although reports of enemy casualties are always difficult to quantify, the Marines likely killed 80 insurgents in the town of Husaybah that day, including foreign fighters. Five Marines from 3/7 were also killed in the battle. Units from every company in the battalion were engaged in Husaybah before the day was over.

On April 7, 2005, Iraqi insurgents captured the city, forcing the local police and US-supported Iraqi Soldiers to abandon the city. U.S. Marines launched several offensives in order to root out the insurgents and retake the city. On May 8, 2005, Marines launched the week-long Operation Matador to flush insurgents out of Qa'im. They faced stiff resistance from both local Iraqi fighters and foreign fighters, but succeeded.

According to local residents, Qa'im remained largely under the control of the insurgents. Along with towns like Haditha, they imposed a Taliban-like law, in which Western music, clothing, and hairstyles were banned. In early September 2005, it was reported that a sign posted outside the town stated "Welcome to the Islamic Republic of Qa'im".

== Post-Iraq War ==
=== IS control ===
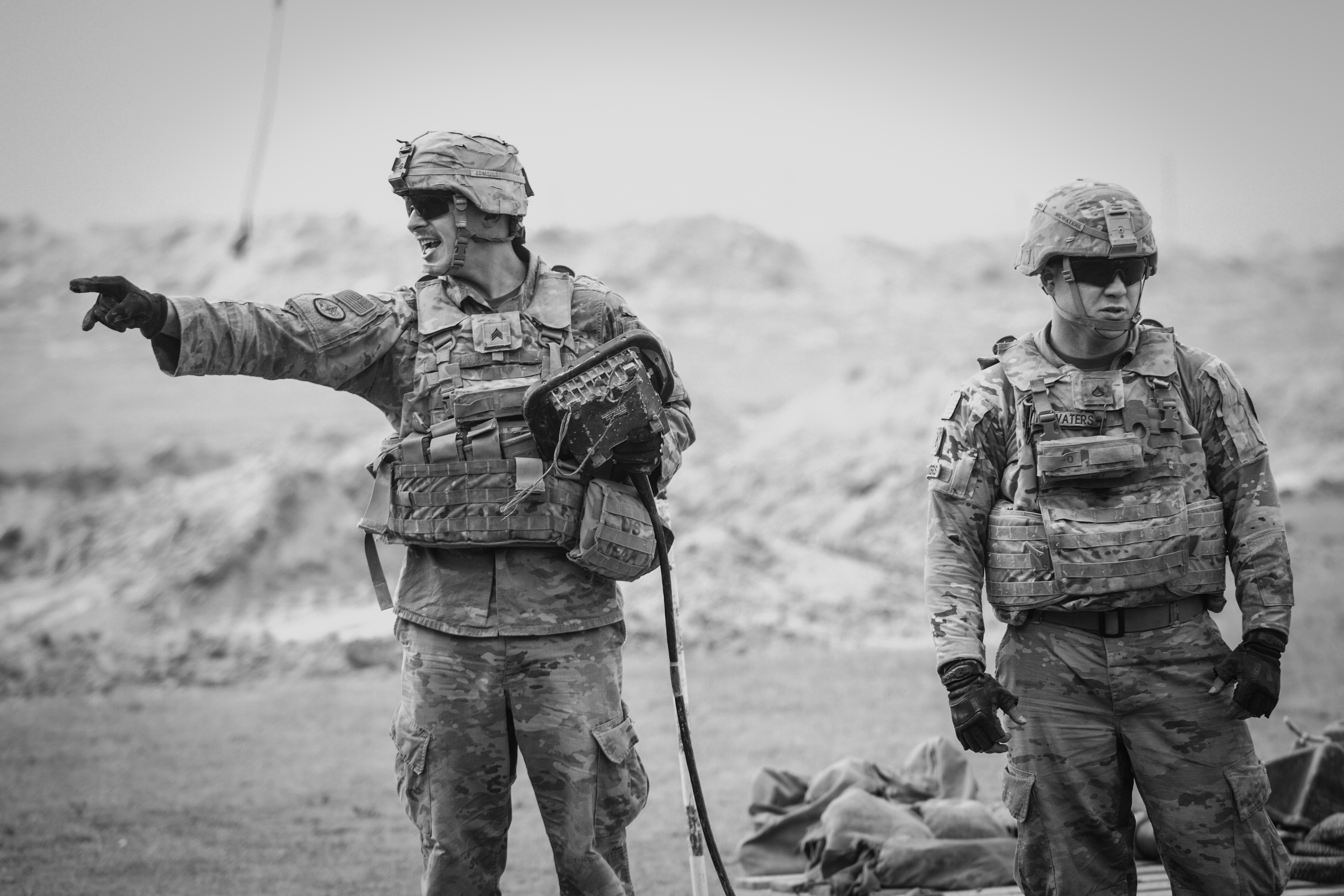
U.S. Army 3rd Cavalry Regiment soldiers fire M777 howitzers into Syria from Firebase Saham, Al-Qa'im, December 2, 2018.

Qa'im was under the control of the Islamic State from June 2014 to November 2017.

On 7 December 2016, an Iraqi Air Force airstrike at the town left 100 people dead including IS militants and civilians. It also injured another 100 people.

By November 2017, Al-Qa'im was one of the last towns still under the control of the Islamic State. In the 2017 Western Iraq campaign, the Iraqi government advanced south of the city and by the end of October had reached its outskirts. They entered Al-Qa'im on 3 November 2017, supported by the Norwegian Telemark Battalion, Danish and American special forces units.

=== Control by Kata'ib Hezbollah ===
After the eviction of IS forces, the Iraqi-based and Iranian-backed militia Kata'ib Hezbollah (KH), a group under the Popular Mobilization Units (PMU), and which is closely linked to Iran's Islamic Revolutionary Guard Corps, has played an important military and security role on the Iraqi side of the border. This role has continued after the reopening of the border crossing on 30 September 2019.

On 25 August 2019 a PMF convoy was hit by two drones near Al-Qa'im killing six, including a senior commander. PMF blamed Israel for the attack.

The Al-Qa'im border crossing between Abu Kamal in Syria and Al-Qa'im in Iraq was reopened on 30 September 2019, after eight years of closure due to Syrian Civil War and Iraqi Civil War.

On 29 December 2019, the United States bombed headquarters of Kata'ib Hezbollah. The airstrikes targeted three targets in Iraq and two in Syria of Kata'ib Hezbollah, and included weapons depots and command posts according to Reuters and a US military statement. The attack was in retaliation for the attack on the K-1 base two days earlier and other attacks on bases with US forces in Iraq. The earlier attack killed a US contractor and wounded four soldiers. Twenty-five KH militiamen were killed in the US airstrikes.

On 28 June 2021, U.S. airstrikes targeted Iran-backed armed Shi'a militias in Al-Qa'im, Iraq and Al-Bukamal, Syria, leaving at least four militiamen dead.

=== Syrian Civil War ===
In 2024, after new offensives by rebels, over 1,500 Syrian government soldiers crossed the border into Al-Qa'im, and surrendered to Iraqi forces.

== Climate ==
Al-Qa'im has a hot desert climate (Köppen climate classification BWh).

Climate data for Al-Qa'im
Month	Jan	Feb	Mar	Apr	May	Jun	Jul	Aug	Sep	Oct	Nov	Dec	Year
Mean daily maximum °C (°F)	13.9 (57.0)	16.8 (62.2)	21.1 (70.0)	26.6 (79.9)	32.7 (90.9)	38.1 (100.6)	40.4 (104.7)	40.5 (104.9)	36.3 (97.3)	30.3 (86.5)	22.1 (71.8)	15.7 (60.3)	27.9 (82.2)
Mean daily minimum °C (°F)	2.5 (36.5)	3.8 (38.8)	6.8 (44.2)	11.7 (53.1)	16.7 (62.1)	20.9 (69.6)	23.3 (73.9)	23.1 (73.6)	18.6 (65.5)	13.8 (56.8)	7.5 (45.5)	3.7 (38.7)	12.7 (54.9)
Average precipitation mm (inches)	24 (0.9)	15 (0.6)	14 (0.6)	18 (0.7)	7 (0.3)	0 (0)	0 (0)	0 (0)	0 (0)	6 (0.2)	9 (0.4)	20 (0.8)	113 (4.4)
