= M45 =

M45 or variants may refer to:

== Military equipment ==
- Carl Gustaf m/45, a 9×19mm Swedish submachine gun
- M45, a variant of the M26 Pershing heavy/medium tank of the United States Army
- Madsen M1945, a 9x19mm Danish submachinegun, also referred to as the M45
- M45 (missile), a French Navy submarine-launched ballistic missile
- M45 Quadmount, a weapon mounting consisting of four "heavy barrel" .50 caliber M2 Browning machine guns
- MEU(SOC) pistol (also M45 MEUSOC), a magazine-fed, recoil-operated, single-action, semiautomatic pistol
- M45, a gas mask currently issued in the United States

== Transport ==
- Infiniti M45, a rebadged Japanese-spec Nissan Gloria of the Infiniti M line
- M-45 (Michigan highway), a state trunkline highway in the US state of Michigan
- M-45 (Spain), a highway bypass built in the Community of Madrid of regional importance
- M45 (Cape Town), a Metropolitan Route in Cape Town, South Africa
- M45 (Johannesburg), a Metropolitan Route in Johannesburg, South Africa
- M45 (Durban), a Metropolitan Route in Durban, South Africa
- M45 motorway, a motorway in Northamptonshire and Warwickshire, England

== Other ==
- M 45, an age category of masters athletics
- M45, a single-nucleotide polymorphism that is a component of Haplogroup P1
- Pleiades (designation Messier 45 or M45), an open star cluster containing middle-aged, hot B-type stars
- Yahoo M45, a computer cluster announced in November 2007 by Yahoo
