= Al-Qa'im border crossing =

Al-Qa'im border crossing معبر القائم الحدودي
- Coordinates: 34°24′N 40°59′E
- Carries: Pedestrians, vehicles, containers
- Locale: Abu Kamal, Syria; Al-Qa'im, Iraq
- Official name: Al-Qa'im border crossing

Location
- Interactive map of Al-Qa'im border crossing

Al-Qa'im border crossing (Arabic: معبر القائم الحدودي) between Syria and Iraq is one of the major supply routes across the Middle East. It connects the town of Abu Kamal in Syria's Deir ez-Zor Governorate to the city of Husaybah, in the Al-Qa'im District of Iraq's Anbar Governorate. The border crossing is about 450 km from Syria's capital Damascus and 340 km from the Iraqi capital Baghdad.

== History ==
On 30 September 2019, Iraq reopened the border crossing after eight years of closure due to Syrian Civil War and Iraqi Civil War.

In December 2024, after new offensives by rebels, over 1,500 Ba'athist Syrian soldiers crossed the border into Al-Qa'im, and surrendered to Iraqi forces.

On 14 June 2025, Iraq reopened the border crossing after the closure due to the Syrian opposition offensive and the fall of the Assad regime in efforts to normalise relations and revive economic ties between the two countries.

== See also ==
- Iraq–Syria border
