= Arab Mashreq International Road Network =

International road network in the Arab World

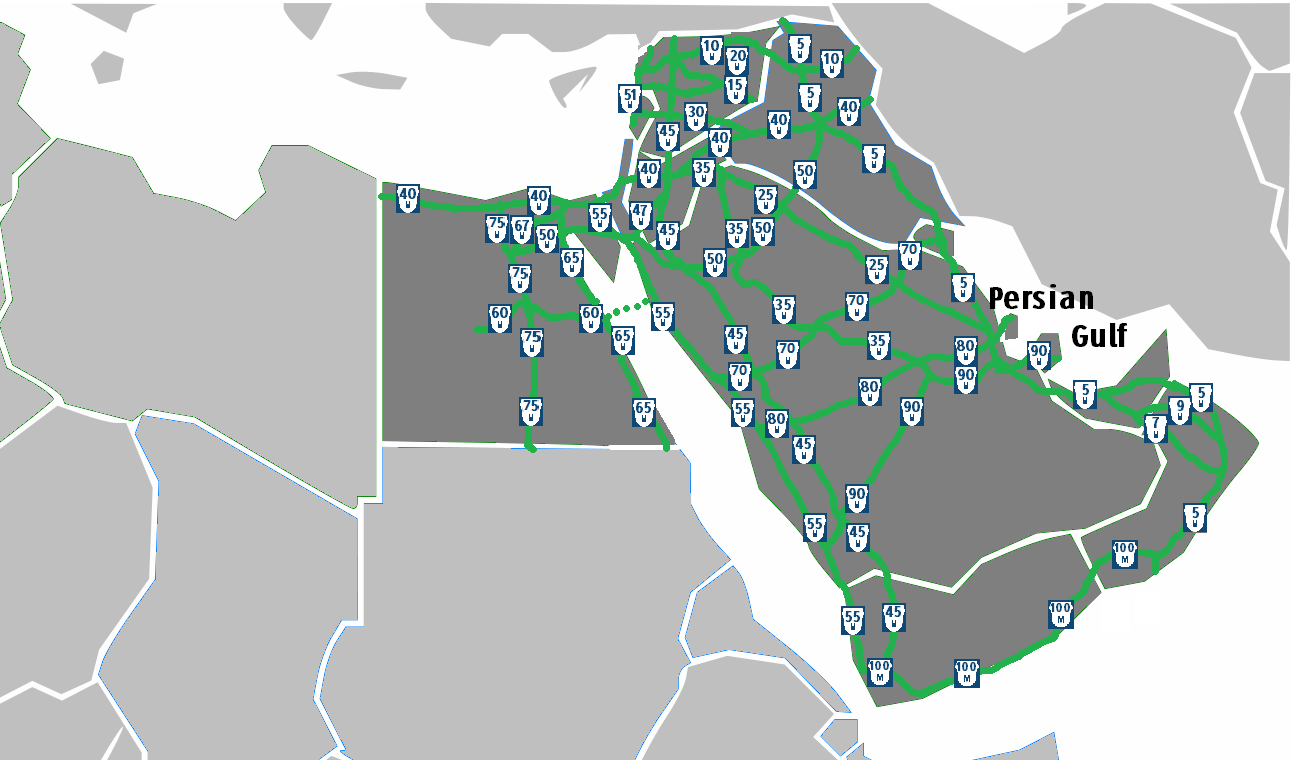
The map of the network

The Arab Mashreq international Road Network is an international road network between the primarily Arab countries of the Mashriq (Syria, Iraq, Jordan, Palestine, Lebanon, Kuwait, Egypt, Saudi Arabia, Bahrain, Qatar, UAE, Oman and Yemen). In addition, part of the network passes through Israel, which is not a party to the agreement that created it as well as non-Arab parts of the region. The network is a result of the 2001 Agreement on International Roads in the Arab Mashreq, a United Nations multilateral treaty that entered into force in 2003 and has been ratified by 13 of the 14 (all except Israel) countries that the network serves.

== Route list ==
Number	Summary	Route	notes
	Iraq, East Arabian Peninsula	Zakho- Mosul – Baghdad – Samawa – Basrah – Safwan Abdally – Kuwait City – Nuwayseeb Khafji – Abu Hadriyah – Dammam – Salwa – Batha'a – Al-Ghuwaifat – Abu Dhabi – Dubai – Fujairah – Kalba Khatmat Malahaw – Sohar – Muscat – Nizwa – Thumrayt – Salalah	Connected to the European route E90 of the European International E-road network
	Abu Dhabi – Sohar	Abu Dhabi – Al-Ain – Al-Buraimi – Sohar	
	Al-Ayn – Nizwa	Al-Ain – Mazyad – Hafit – Nizwa	
	Northern Iraq – East Mediterranean	Haj Omran – Erbil – Mosul – Rabieyyah Yaroubia – Qamishli – Aleppo – Lattakia	Connected to AH2 of the Asian Highway Network
	Aleppo – Ramadi	Aleppo – Deir Ez-Zor – Albu Kamal Al-Qa'em – Ramadi	
	Central Syria	Qamishli – Hasakah – Deir Ez-Zor – Homs – Tartus	
	Northern Saudi Arabia	Hadithah – Ar'ar – Hafar El-Batin – Abu Hadriyah	
	Western Iraq – Eastern Mediterranean	Baghdad - Ramadi - Rutbah – Al-Walid Tanf – Damascus – Jedeidet Yabus Masna' – Beirut	
	Middle Arabian peninsula	Amman – Azraq – Omari Hadithah – Sakakah – Ha'il – Burayda – Riyadh – Al Kharj	
	Iraq, Jordan, Palestine, and the Mediterranean Southern Coast	Munthareya- Khanaqin – Baghdad – Ramadi – Rutbah – Tarabil Karamah – Al Azraq – Amman – King Hussein Bridge – Jerusalem – Ashdod – Gaza – Rafah – Arish – Kantara Bridge – Port Said – Alexandria – As Sallum	Connected to AH2 of the Asian Highway Network and Trans-African Highway Route 1
	Syria – Jordan – Saudi Arabia – Yemen	Bab Al Hawa – Aleppo – Homs – Damascus – Nasib Jaber -Alsarhan – Amman – Qetraneh – Jorof – Ma'an – Al Mudawara Halat Ammar – Tabuk – Qaliba – Medina – Mecca – Abha – Elb Baqim – Sanaa – Ta'izz	
	Ma'an – Aqaba	Ma'an – Aqaba	
	Baghdad – Cairo	Baghdad – Karbala – Al Nukhaib – Jedeidat Ar'ar Jedeidat Ar'ar – Ar'ar – Sakakah – Qaliba – Tabuk – Ad-Durra – Aqaba – Eilat – Nuweiba – Nekhel – Shatt – Cairo	
	Eastern Mediterranean Coast	Kasab – Lattakia – Tartus – Dabboussieh Abboudieh – Tripoli – Beirut – Naqoura	
	Sinai – East Red Sea	Arish – Nakhel – Nuweiba Eilat Aqaba – Ad-Durra – Dhuba – Yanbu – Rabigh – Jeddah – Darb – At Tuwal Harad – Hodeidah – Al-Mukha	
	Western Saudi Arabia – Upper Egypt	Dhuba Safaga – Qena – Mutt	
	Red Sea – West Coast	Ismailia – Suez – Safaga – Halayeb	
	Kuwait – Yanbu	Al-Kuwait – As-Salmi Ar-Ruqi – Hafar al-Batin – Al Artawiyah – Burayda – Medina – Yanbu	Eventually a section will be added upon being completed, branching off from this route at Artawiya and heading east to Jubail via Abu Hadriya
	Nile Valley	Alexandria – Cairo – Qena – Arqin	
	Manama – Jeddah	Manama -King Fahd Causeway- Dammam – Riyadh – Mecca – Jeddah	
	Doha – Ad-Darb	Doha – Abu Samra as Salwa- Batha'a – Haradh – Al Kharj – Sulayyil – Abha – Ad-Darb	
	Southern Arabian Peninsula	Thumrayt – Mazyounah Shahan – Al Ghaydah – Al-Mukalla – Aden – Ta'izz – Al-Mukha	

== See also ==
Other intercontinental highway systems:

- Asian Highway Network
- International E-road network
- Trans-African Highway network
