= Yahoo M45 =

The M45 Project (or M45) is the name of a cluster announced in November 2007 by Yahoo!.

According to Yahoo!, it has approximately 4,000 processors, three terabytes of memory, 1.5 petabytes of disks, and a peak performance of more than 27 trillion calculations per second (27 teraflops), placing it among the top 50 fastest supercomputers in the world.

== Name ==
M45 is named after the Messier catalog number of the constellation commonly known as the Pleiades.
