= Abu Kamal =

City in Syria

Al-Bukamal ٱلْبُوكَمَال / أَبُو كَمَال
- City
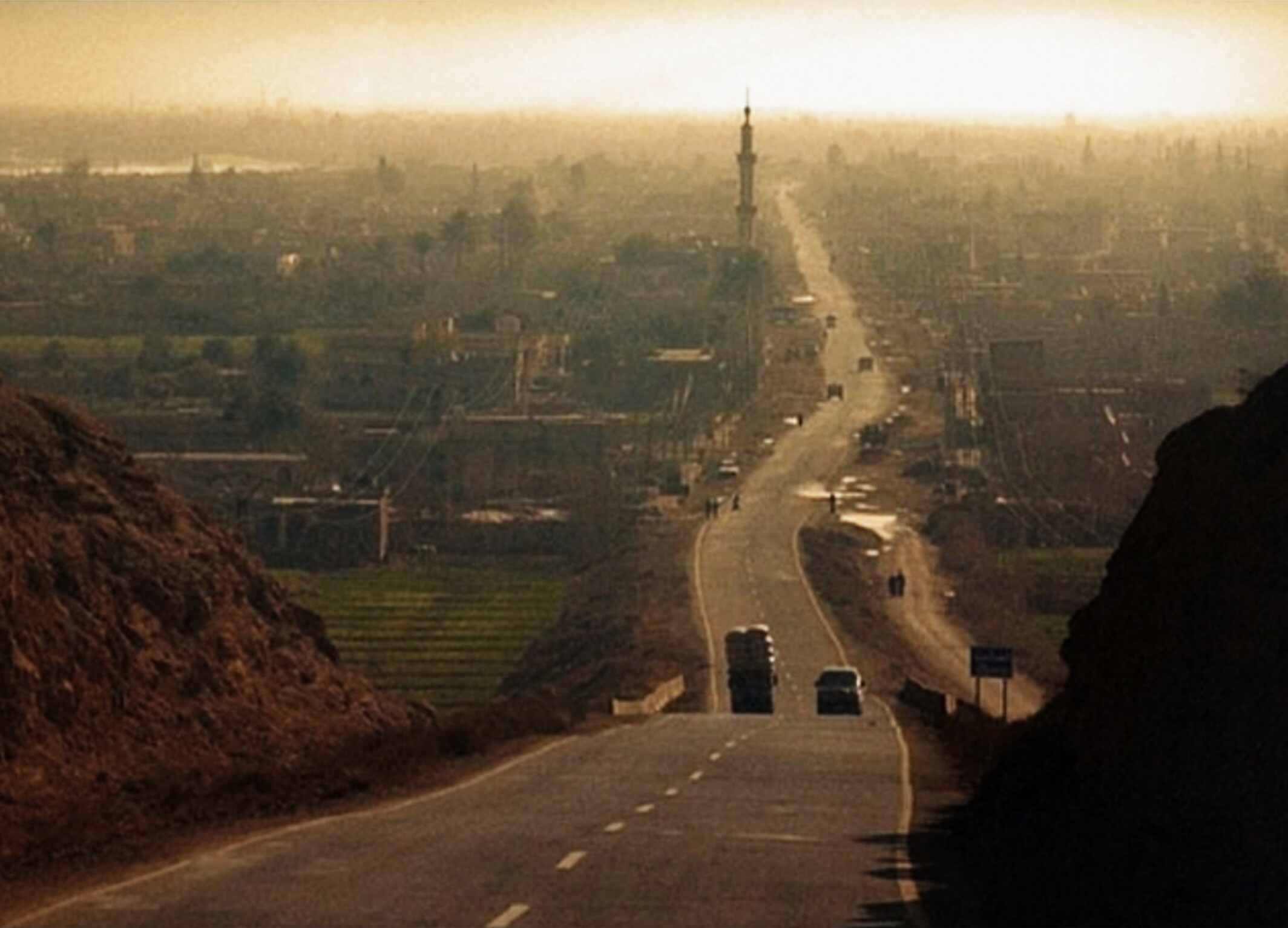
- The entrance to Abu Kamal from the town of Al-Salihiyah

- Location in Syria
- Coordinates: 34°27′13″N 40°56′12″E
- Country: Syria
- Governorate: Deir ez-Zor
- District: Abu Kamal
- Subdistrict: Abu Kamal
- Elevation: 175 m (574 ft)

Population (2004 census)
  - Total: 42,510
- Time zone: UTC+2 (EET)
  - Summer (DST): +3

Abu Kamal (Arabic: أَبُو كَمَال, romanized: ʾAbū Kamāl), also known as Al-Bukamal (Arabic: ٱلْبُوكَمَال, romanized: al-Būkamāl), is a city in eastern Syria located on the Euphrates river in the Deir ez-Zor Governorate and near the border with Iraq. It is the administrative centre of the Abu Kamal District and the local subdistrict (Abu Kamal Subdistrict). Just to the south-east is the Al-Qa'im border crossing to the town of Husaybah in the Al-Qa'im District of Iraq's Al Anbar Governorate.

== Etymology ==
When part of the Ottoman Empire, Abu Kamal was called kışla, pronounced locally as "qashla", which is a Turkish word for "military barracks". This name "Qashla" is still used by some inhabitants of the area, especially by elderly villagers. The name "Al-Bukamal" (Arabic: البوكمال) means "the family of Kamal", Kamal being the tribe that lives there, whereas the name "Abu Kamal" means "the father of Kamal".

== History ==
In the 17th century, Abu Kamal was the seat of a sanjak of the Ottoman Empire in the Rakka Eyalet. It was a kaza (subdistrict) center within Zor Sanjak until the end of Ottoman rule in 1918. In 1896, the old mud village was relocated a mile upstream because it was in danger of being ruined by flooding. The new village was built from stone and had wide streets. The village and its subdistrict formed the center of the Arab Uqaydat tribe and was largely Sunni Muslim, with the exception of a small Christian community originally from Deir ez-Zor and Mosul. At the beginning of the 20th century, it contained eighty houses, the residence of the kaymakam (kaza governor), a police station, a ferry, and had a population of about 500. The kaza of Abu Kamal in 1890 had a population of 15,000.

Abu Kamal became part of the French Mandate for Syria and the Lebanon in 1921, and the French made it the seat of a large garrison. In 1946 it became part of independent Syria. Abu Kamal's position at the border of Syria and Iraq has made it an important commercial as well as political center.

Abu Kamal is located near to Al-Qa'im, a crossing point for the Iraqi insurgency and the location of Operation Steel Curtain in November 2005. On 27 October 2008, during the Iraq War, four US helicopters carried out a raid on the village of Sukkariyeh in Abu Kamal district. It was the first known raid inside Syria by the US. News reports indicate that at least seven people were killed, four of them children. The Syrian Foreign Minister Walid Muallem stated that "Killing civilians in international law means a terrorist aggression."

=== Syrian civil war ===
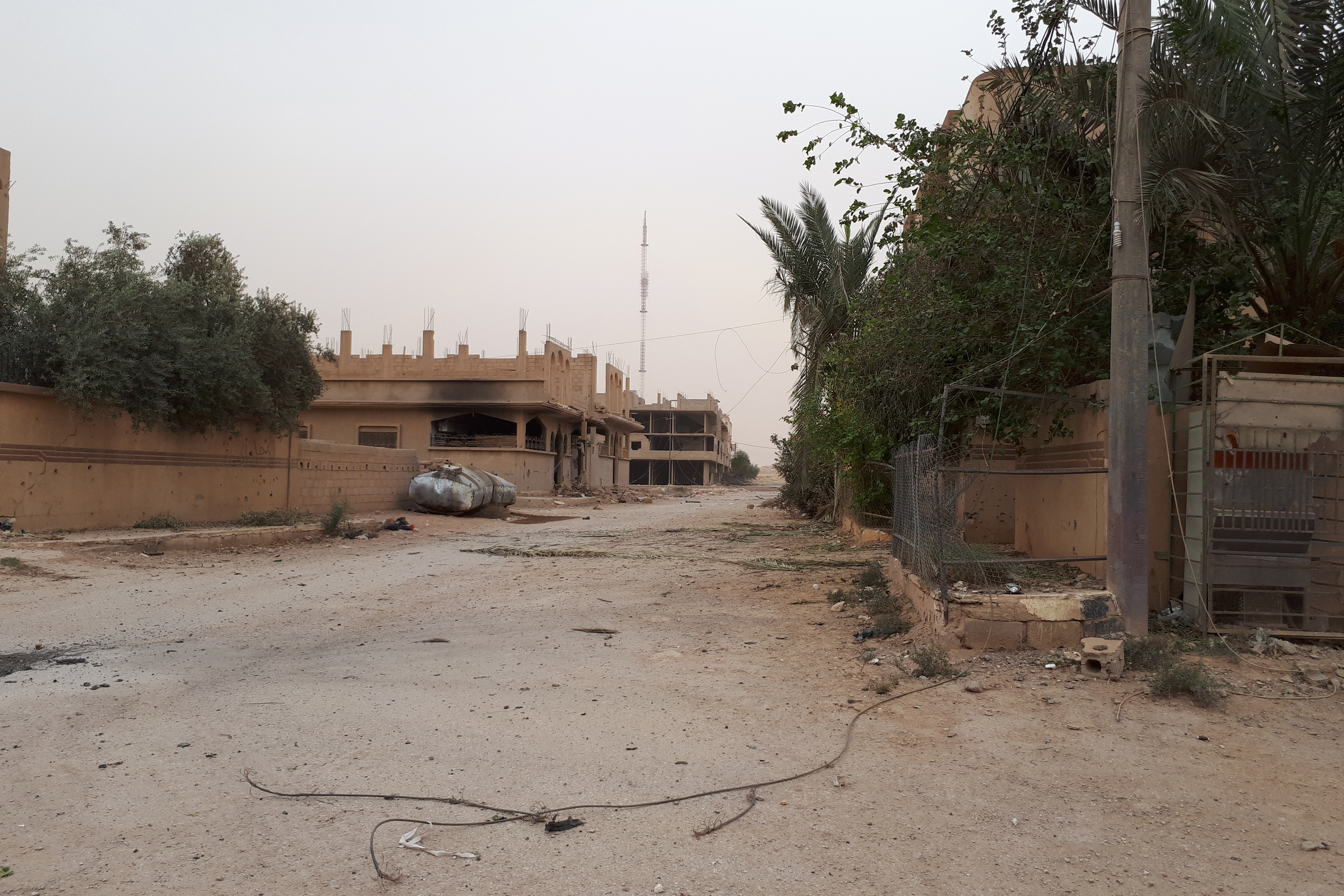
Abu Kamal, one of the districts (November 19, 2017)

During the Syrian Civil War, in late July 2012, the Free Syrian Army (FSA) took over the town, along with its associated border post with Iraq. In early September 2012, France 24 reported that the Hamdan military airport was under attack by FSA. On 16 November 2012, FSA took over the nearby Hamdan military airport, which was once used to transport farm produce, but was converted to a base for helicopters and military tanks. The capture of Hamdan meant that the Syrian Army forces only held one air base in the province—the main military airport in Deir ez-Zor city.

=== Islamic State takeover ===
Abu Kamal was captured by the Islamic State forces between late-June and early-July 2014 during a three-month offensive across Deir ez-Zor Governorate. On 3 July 2014, SOHR said that city of Mayadin, the second biggest town in Deir Ezzor province, was also "now under IS control, after Al-Nusra Front evacuated its headquarters there, and IS raised its banner". On 3 July 2014, all towns and villages on the route from Abu Kamal to Al-Bab, passing through the Raqqa province, were under the Islamic State control.

Owing to its distance from the frontline, the town would see little fighting between its capture by ISIL in 2014 and ISIL's retreat in 2017. During the lull in conflict, the town was the target of a failed opposition attack by the US-backed New Syrian Army in June 2016; the offensive lasted only a day and led to a total reversal of New Syrian Army advances to Abu Kamal.

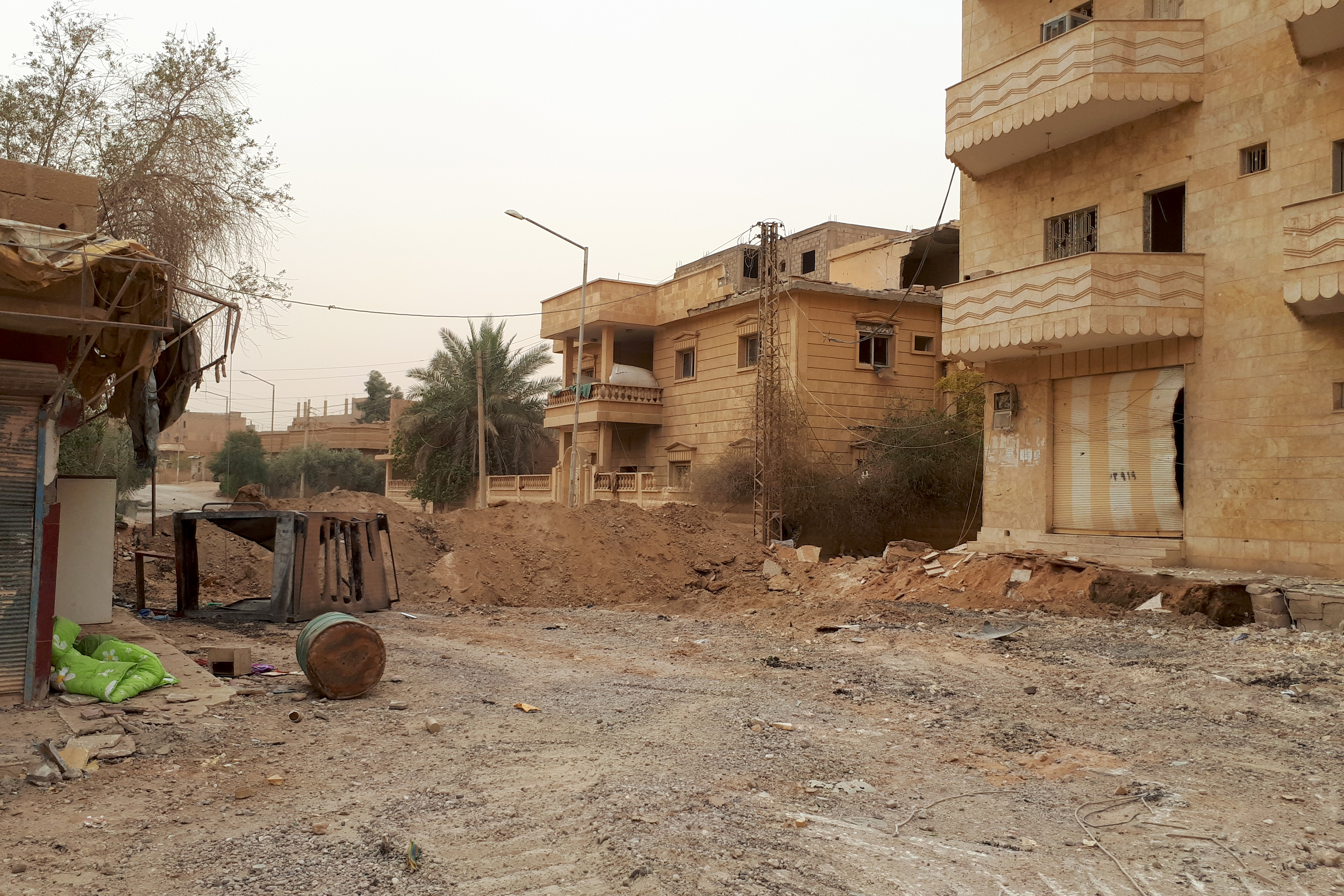
Abu Kamal, destroyed buildings (November 19, 2017)

On October 14, 2017 the Syrian Arab Army took the city of Mayadin, located 80 kilometers from Abu Kamal. After that Abu Kamal was the only large city that remained under ISIL control.

On October 25, the road Al Qaim – Abu Kamal – Mayadin – Deir ez-Zor was blocked after a series of airstrikes conducted by Russian Air Force.

From 1 to 4 November 6 Russian Tu-22M3 strategic bombers conducted airstrikes on ISIL objects near Abu Kamal. On November 7 the SAA started operation to take Abu Kamal with support of allied forces, like the Iranian-backed Hezbollah and the Iranian Revolution Guard Corps (IRGC).

On 9 November 2017, ISIL retreated from the town, leaving fighters dispersed in villages and small towns in the desert. Army spokesman Gen. Ali Mayhoub stated:

″The liberation of Abu Kamal is of great importance because it is a declaration of the fall of this group’s project in the region generally and the collapse of its supporters’ illusions to divide it, control large parts of the Syria-Iraq borders and secure supply routes between the two countries.″

One day later Commander of the Russian force grouping in Syria Colonel General Sergei Surovikin confirmed the retaking of Abu Kamal:

“Units of the 5th Assault Corps, assault groups of brigadier general Suheil and militias with support of Russian Air Force took part in liberating Abu Kamal. In the final stages of hostilities the Syrian Arab Army gained control over the Syrian-Iraqi border near the Euphrates River”.

However, on November 11 the city was recaptured by ISIL. The Syrian Army and its allies retook complete control of the city by 19 November. Concerns have been raised about what would happen to the village once ISIL was removed.

=== Iranian presence ===
Following the elimination of ISIS, Iranian-allied militias have occupied Abu Kamal and its countryside since late 2017. Since the end of 2017, the Iraqi Popular Mobilization Forces, had control of the al-Qa'im border crossing, while Hezbollah and the Haidariyoun, Fatemiyoun and Zainabiyoun militias had control of Mayadin, west of Abu Kamal, both on the south bank of the Euphrates River. The Syrian Democratic Forces (SDF) had control of the north bank.

Fox News reported on 4 September that a new "classified Iranian project", the Imam Ali military base, was being constructed near Abu Kamal, which was confirmed by satellite images.

On 30 September 2019, after eight years of closure, Syria and Iraq reopened the Al-Qa'im border crossing between Abu Kamal and Al-Qa'im.

In 2021, it was reported that an Iran-backed Shia militia composed of mostly local tribal fighters called "Hashemiyoun" had been formed in Eastern Syria. The group was reportedly headquartered in Abu Kamal.

On 27 October 2023 the US carried out air strikes against bases near the town that it claimed were being used by Islamic Revolutionary Guard Corps. The US said that these were in response to Iranian backed attacks on its bases in the region.

On 10 December 2024, the Syrian opposition forces had announced that they had captured of Al-Bukamal.

== Climate ==
Abu Kamal has a hot desert climate (BWh) in the Köppen–Geiger climate classification system.

Climate data for Abu Kamal (1961–1990)
Month	Jan	Feb	Mar	Apr	May	Jun	Jul	Aug	Sep	Oct	Nov	Dec	Year
Mean daily maximum °C (°F)	13.4 (56.1)	16.4 (61.5)	20.8 (69.4)	26.5 (79.7)	32.8 (91.0)	37.7 (99.9)	40.6 (105.1)	39.9 (103.8)	36.5 (97.7)	29.7 (85.5)	21.5 (70.7)	15.1 (59.2)	27.6 (81.7)
Daily mean °C (°F)	7.4 (45.3)	9.9 (49.8)	14.0 (57.2)	19.6 (67.3)	25.2 (77.4)	29.2 (84.6)	32.6 (90.7)	31.6 (88.9)	27.8 (82.0)	21.6 (70.9)	14.0 (57.2)	8.8 (47.8)	20.1 (68.2)
Mean daily minimum °C (°F)	2.1 (35.8)	3.9 (39.0)	7.2 (45.0)	12.0 (53.6)	16.7 (62.1)	20.9 (69.6)	23.8 (74.8)	23.2 (73.8)	19.0 (66.2)	13.8 (56.8)	7.2 (45.0)	3.4 (38.1)	12.8 (55.0)
Average precipitation mm (inches)	23.2 (0.91)	17.7 (0.70)	24.3 (0.96)	22.0 (0.87)	7.5 (0.30)	0.7 (0.03)	0.0 (0.0)	0.0 (0.0)	0.3 (0.01)	7.2 (0.28)	10.3 (0.41)	21.9 (0.86)	135.1 (5.32)
Average precipitation days (≥ 1.0 mm)	4.3	3.2	3.5	2.7	1.4	0.1	0.0	0.0	0.1	1.4	1.8	3.5	22.0
Source: NOAA

== Notable people ==
- Yusuf Zuayyin, twice Prime Minister of Syria
- Sufian Allaw, minister of petroleum and mineral resources of Syria
- Nawaf al-Fares, Syrian ambassador to Iraq, defector
- Saddam al-Jamal, Syrian jihadist militant of the Islamic State

== Gallery ==
Dura-Europos

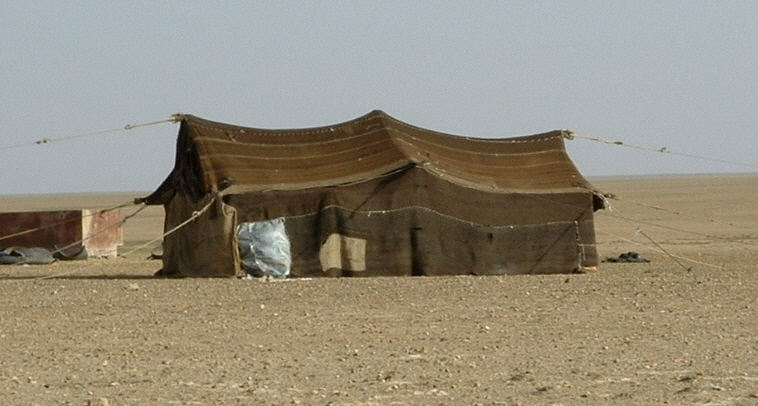
A Bedouin tent at Abu Kamal

Sunset on the Euphrates

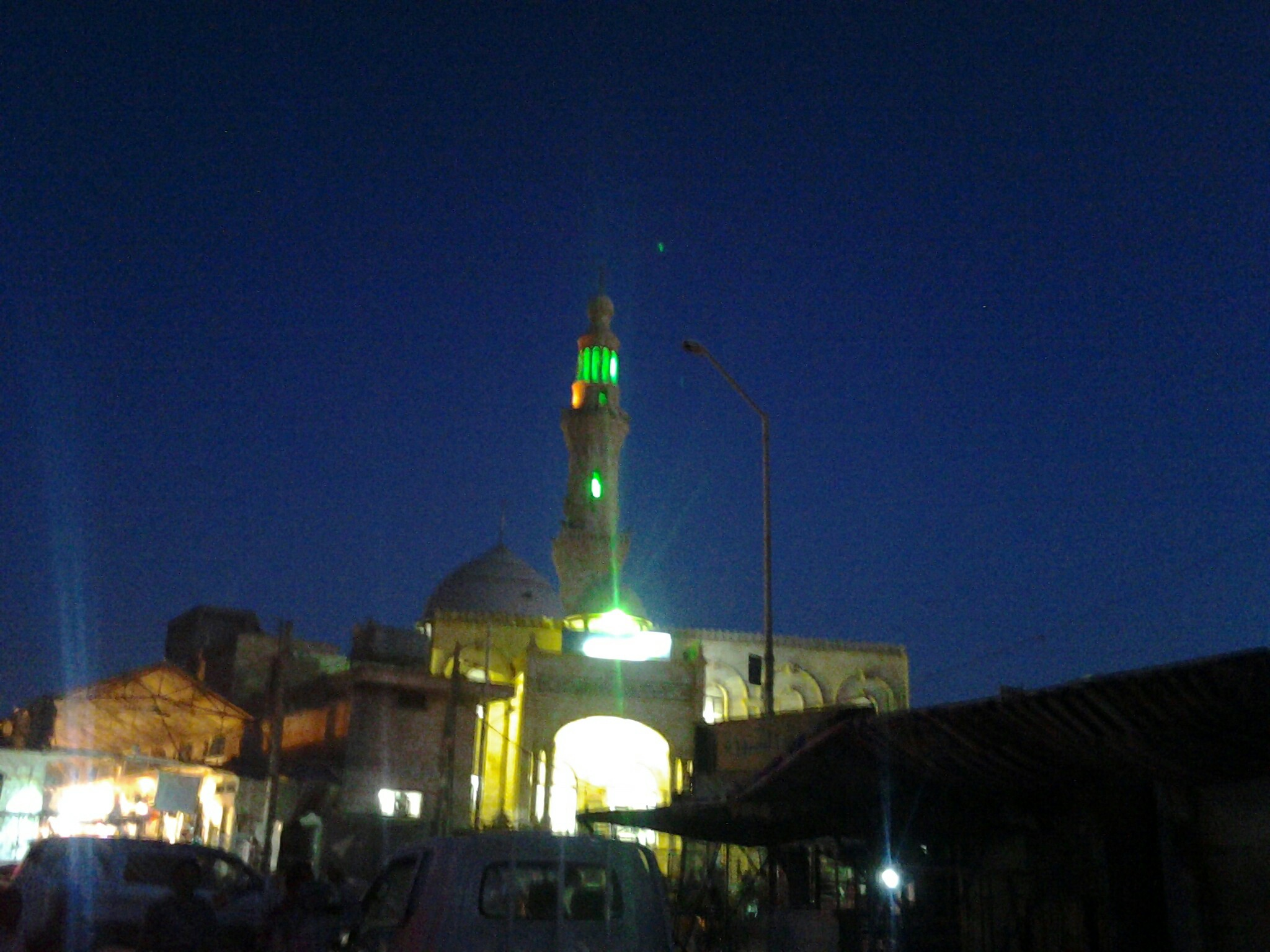
The Great Mosque of Abu Kamal in evening
