= Iraq–Syria border =

International border

Iraqi–Syrian border
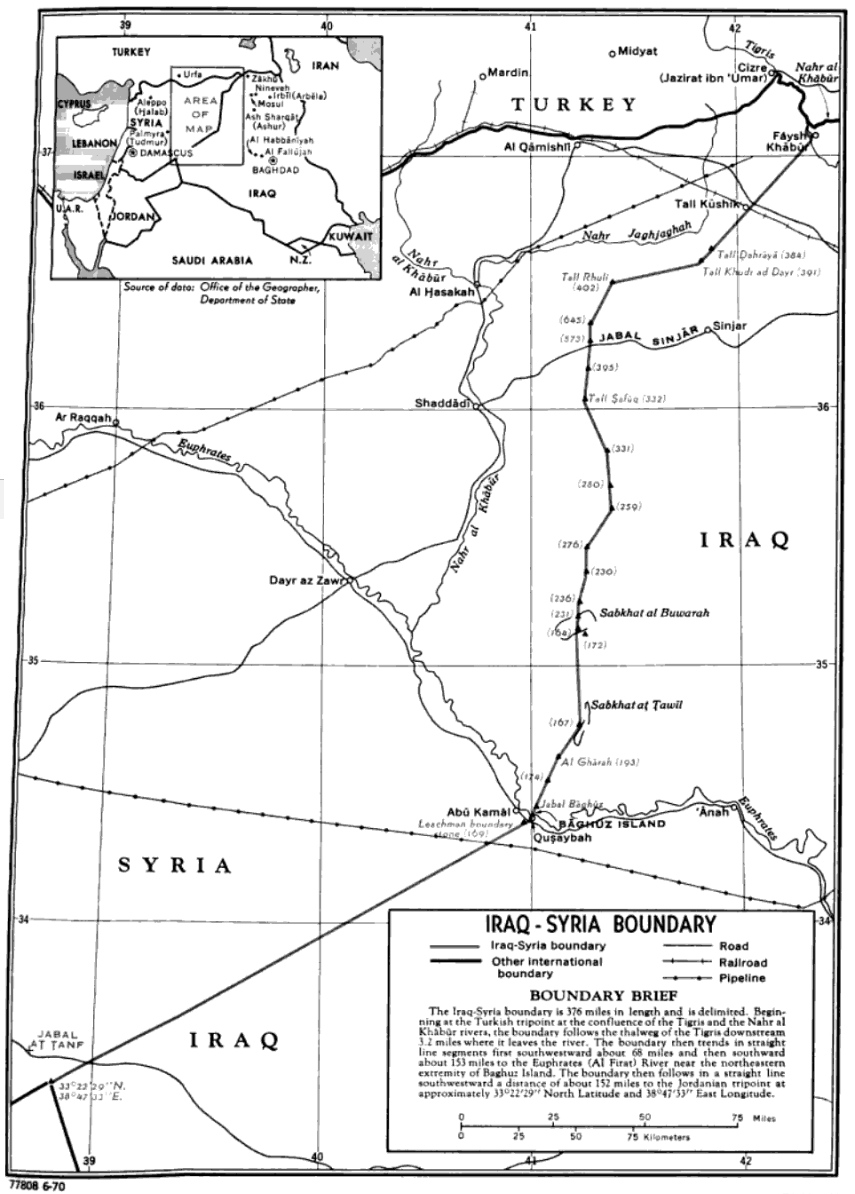
- Map of the Iraq-Syria border

Characteristics
- Entities: Iraq Syria
- Length: 599 km

History
- Established: 1932; Following the Sykes-Picot Agreement and the Paulet–Newcombe Agreement
- Current shape: Shared between Iraq and Syria; Syrian and Iraqi Kurdistan control
- Treaties: Paulet–Newcombe Agreement, League of Nations Commission Review (1932)
- Notes: The border has been unstable due to the Iraq War (2003), the Syrian Civil War, and the presence of the Islamic State.

The Iraqi–Syrian border is the border between Syria and Iraq and runs for a total length of 599 km (372 mi) across Upper Mesopotamia and the Syrian desert, from the tripoint with Jordan in the south-west to the tripoint with Turkey in the north-east.

== Description ==
The border starts in the west at the tripoint with Jordan at 33.3747°N 38.7936°E, with the initial section being a continuation of the long straight line that forms the eastern section of the Jordan–Syria border. The boundary then shifts in the vicinity of the Euphrates river and the Al-Qa'im border crossing, proceeding northwards via a series of short straight lines, and then north-eastwards to the Tigris river. The Tigris then forms a short 3-4 mile section of the border up to the Turkish tripoint at the confluence with the Khabur river at 37.1060°N 42.3572°E.

== History ==
At the start of the 20th century, the Ottoman Empire controlled what is now Syria and Iraq. During the First World War, an Arab Revolt - supported by Britain - succeeded in removing the Ottomans from most of the Middle East. As a result of the Anglo-French Sykes-Picot Agreement, Britain gained control of the Ottoman vilayets of Mosul, Baghdad and Basra, which it organised into the mandate of Iraq in 1920, with France organising a mandate over Syria.

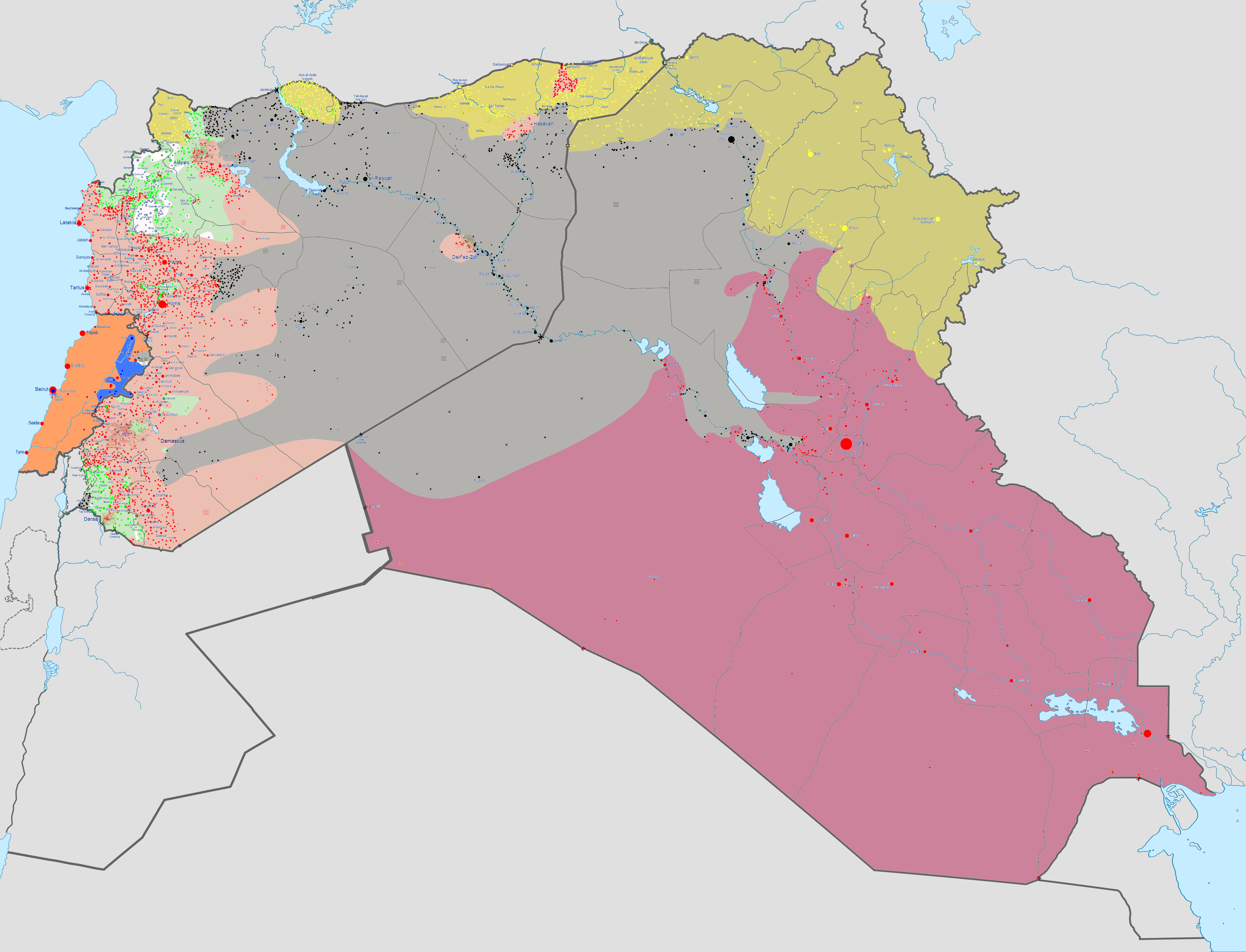
Islamic State's territory, in grey, at the time of its greatest territorial extent in May 2015

In the period 1920-23 France and Britain signed a series of agreements, collectively known as the Paulet–Newcombe Agreement, which created the modern Jordan-Syria and Iraq–Syria borders, as an amendment to what had been designated the A zone in the Sykes–Picot Agreement. In 1932, it was finalised following a League of Nations commission review.

Since the beginning of the 2003 Iraq War, the border region has become unstable, exacerbated since 2011 by the ongoing Syrian Civil War. Most of the border region on both sides was part of the Islamic State (IS) for some years, although its northernmost portion remained under Kurdish control, forming the border between Rojava and Iraqi Kurdistan. The Islamic State has since lost control of the border, which is controlled by Rojava and the Syrian government on the Syrian side, and the Kurdistan Regional Government and Iraqi government on the Iraqi side.

== Border crossings ==
There are three official border crossings between Syria and Iraq, and one makeshift crossing:

- The Rabia border crossing, on the Al-Shaddadah–Mosul road, is the most northerly official crossing.
- The Al-Qa'im border crossing between Abu Kamal in Syria and Al Qa'im in Iraq. The crossing was reopened on 30 September 2019, after eight years of closure due to Syrian Civil War and Iraqi Civil War. Since the reopening of the border crossing, the Iranian-backed militia Kata'ib Hezbollah, a group under the Popular Mobilization Units, has played an important military and security role on the Iraqi side of the border.
- The Al Waleed border crossing, known in Syria as al-Tanf, is located in the Ar-Rutba District of the Al Anbar Governorate, close to the westernmost point of Iraq and the northeasternmost point of Jordan, in the desert Badia region. It serves as the main border checkpoint on the highway between Damascus and Baghdad. The al-Tanf checkpoint is on the Syrian side of the border, in Homs province. There are Palestinian refugee camps on both sides: the Al-Waleed camp on the Iraqi side and the Al Tanf camp on the Syrian side. The crossing was captured by ISIL in May 2015 and repelled in March 2016.
- The Semalka Border Crossing is a pontoon bridge across the Tigris established by the Kurdistan Regional Government during the Syrian Civil War about 1 km (0.62 mi) downstream from the Iraqi–Syrian–Turkish tripoint, and just north of Faysh Khabur in Iraq.

== See also ==
- Iraq–Syria relations
- Iraqi Civil War (2014–2017)
- Kurdistan
- Syrian Civil War
