= Al-Murasant Air base =

Military airbase in Anbar, Iraq

Al-Murasant air base
- Iraq

Site information
- Owner: Iraqi Air Force

Location
- Coordinates: 33.05793°N 39.605326°E

Al-Murassant air base is a small military airport located in Rutbah District, western Iraq, 70 kilometers east of the al-Waleed border crossing near Syria. The airbase used to be run by Iraqi Air Forces until it went out of service following the 2003 American invasion of Iraq. In 2014 ISIS took control of the area, with Iraqi forces freeing the airbase in 2017. The popular mobilization made the airbase their main camp in the Anbar Governorate.
