= Wadi al-Abyad =

Coordinates: 33°58′52″N 42°33′23″E

Wadi al-Abyad or al-Ubayyid (Arabic: وادي الأبيض, "white wadi") is the second-longest wadi in Iraq (after Wadi Hauran) and extends in west of Iraq within Al Anbar Governorate and Karbala Governorate. It runs for roughly 250 kilometres (160 mi), from Iraqi-Saudi border (near Arar) in Al Anbar Governorate till Lake Razazah in west of Karbala Governorate. It is 1 kilometre (0.62 mi) wide,40 and 50 metres (130 and 160 ft) deep.

Often the term of Wadi al-Abyad referred to a large area including Wadi al-Abyad itself, its tributaries, and surroundings. Wadi al-Abyad is a dry place in spite of oasis called Ghadir Abu Muraji located in central part of the valley within Al Anbar Governorate in addition to some seasonal pools spread in the Wadi during rainy season. Pools and grass provide good grasslands for nomads and their livestock. In some rainy years, Wadi al-Abyad is filled with rainwater which flows into the Lake Razazah.

== Climate ==
Hot desert climate is dominant in Wadi al-Abyad, temperatures vary between below freezing on some winter nights and over 40 degrees in July and early August, beside a large variation between day's temperatures and night. Rain season is from October till June, precipitation not more than 87 mm per year, this amount of rain is lowest rainfall amount in Iraq. Overall, winds eastern or western direction, in summer season southern hot sand storms blow from Najd desert.

== Flora and fauna ==
Arid climate has impact on the flora and fauna in the wadi. No plants grow there except desert vegetation especially Alhagi, Tamarix, and Artemisia. Also, animals have adapted to the life of the desert. The most important mammals that live in Wadi al-Abyad are the hare, Rüppell's fox, gray wolf, goitered gazelle, besides many species of the resident birds and immigrant such as bustard, sandgrouse in addition to pigeons .

== Al-Abyad barrage ==
Wadi al-Abyad Barrage was built in 2002 at the lowest point in Wadi al-Abyad near Iraqi-Saudi border within Al Anbar Governorate to save rainwater during winter and spring to a long summer season. Saved water is used for bedouins and their cattle. A barrage's capacity is 25–50 million mc. A pipe is laid under the barrage to dispose of surplus water. Barrage's dimensions are 8 km long,2 km wide, and 18 m high.

== Nukhayb ==
Nukhayb (Arabic: النخيب) An Iraqi town located in Al Anbar at Wadi al-Abyad. The population are Arabs and Sunnis most of whom belong to the `Anizzah tribe. The main source of income in Nukhayb is agriculture (depending on wells), sheep grazing and camels, besides small business.

== Security situation ==
Generally Wadi al-Abyad safe and well protected, Iraqi security forces patrolling regularly in Wadi al-Abyad due to its location near holy cities Karbalaa and Najaf. Though some attacks have occurred in Wadi al-Abyad, first offensive happened in September 2011, resulted in killing 22 Shia pilgrims en route from Damascus to Karbalaa were stopped at a fake checkpoint near Nukhayb, then killed by gunmen. In another false checkpoint attack, 14 Iraqi border guards were killed by militants in June 2013.

Early July 2014 IS's elements attacked Nukhayb and took control on it after Iraqi security forces fled to Karbalaa. But Iraqi Security forces and popular mobilization forces have regained Nukhayb in late August 2014.
