= Akashat ambush =

2013 military operation

Coordinates: 33.2500°N 40.5833°E

- Part of the Syrian Civil War and Iraqi insurgency
| Date | 4 March 2013 |
| Location | Near Akashat, Anbar Province, Iraq |
| Result | ISI victory |

Belligerents
| Islamic State of Iraq | (Syria) Syrian Arab Republic; Iraq |

Commanders and leaders
| Abu Waheeb | Maj. Ali Juwair al-Dulaimi; Lt. Col. Mohammed Khalaf al-Dulaimi |

Units involved
| ISIL military | Syrian Army; Iraqi Army |

Strength
| (Islamic State) Unknown | 64 soldiers 19 soldiers |

Casualties and losses
| (Islamic State) Unknown | 51 soldiers killed 10 soldiers wounded 13 soldiers killed |

The Akashat ambush was a well planned assault against an unarmed Syrian Army convoy defended by Iraqi soldiers that took place on 4 March 2013, as the group was travelling in the province of Anbar, next to the border with Syria. The Islamic State of Iraq claimed responsibility for the ambush on 11 March 2013.

== Prelude ==
On 1 March 2013, according to the Syrian officer who was in charge of the Yaarubiyeh border crossing, north of the Iraqi border, reported a man identifying himself as the leader of one faction of the al-Qaida-affiliated Jabhat al-Nusra called him that day demanding that he and his men surrender. He refused and the poorly defended border outpost, which only had 70 soldiers despite being one of the three main ones along the Syrian–Iraqi border, came under intense attack resulting in the deaths of six of his men. He said this forced him and the remaining men to the Iraqi Rabiya border crossing.

The group of 64 were detained by Iraqi authorities and transported to Baghdad, where from there they were to be transported back to Syrian authorities in the Al Waleed border crossing, located in Iraq's Sunni majority Al Anbar Governorate close to the Syrian and Jordanian borders.

== Ambush ==
The incident took place on 4 March 2013, while the convoy was on its way to the al-Waleed Border Crossing post in southwestern Iraq, located in the predominantly Sunni Anbar Province. The convoy was transporting the unarmed Syrian soldiers in several buses to al-Waleed, where they would be transferred back to Syrian authorities.

While the convoy was on its way, Islamic State of Iraq gunmen set up a well coordinated assault on the convoy with roadside bombs, automatic weapons, and rocket-propelled grenades. The gunmen attacked the convoy from two sides. Explosives were first detonated on Iraqi military escorts assigned to protect transport the lorries full of unarmed Syrian soldiers. A total of 51 Syrian soldiers died, while ten others were wounded. Thirteen Iraqi soldiers were also killed in the attack.

== Perpetrators ==
The identity of the attackers was immediately unknown, but Iraqi officials initially blamed the Free Iraqi Army, who are predominantly Sunni and have connections to the rebel group of the Free Syrian Army. This incident also raised fears that Iraq could be drawn into the Syrian Civil War.

On 11 March 2013, the Islamic State of Iraq claimed responsibility for the attack in an online statement, stating that they had set ambushes on roads to the Syrian border and had "annihilated" the convoy. The statement referred to the convoy as a "column of the Safavid army", a reference to the Shia Persian dynasty that ruled Iran from 1501 to 1736. The group also claimed that the presence of Syrian soldiers in Iraq showed "firm co-operation" between the Syrian and Iraqi governments which they referred to as the "Nusayri-Rawafid alliance".
