= Akashat =

Akashat عكاشات
- Location within Iraq
- Coordinates: 33°40′00″N 39°58′00″E
- Country: Iraq
- Province: Al-Anbar
- District: Ar-Rutba

Population
  - Total: 5,000
- Time zone: UTC+3 (AST)

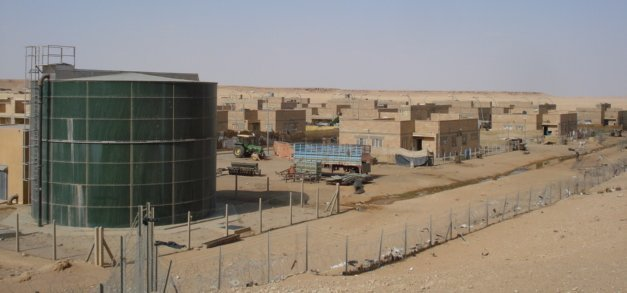
Garden village of Sikak in Akashat

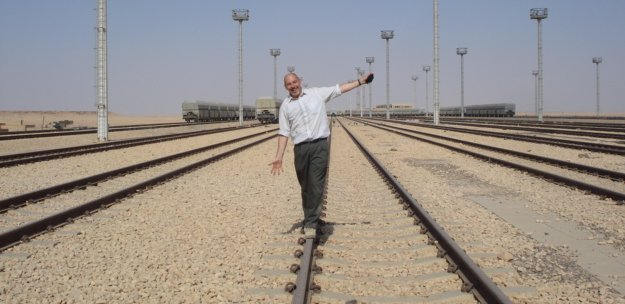
Railroad tracks in Akashat

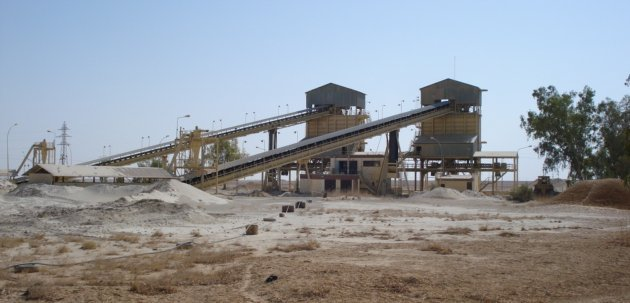
Phosphate operation in Akashat

Principal railway routes in Iraq with westernmost terminus at Akashat

Akashat (Arabic: عكاشات) is a small town in the northwest of the Ar-Rutba District of the Al Anbar province of Iraq, on the road between the towns of Ar-Rutbah and Al-Qa'im. It has a population of around 5,000. It was built as an industrial village in 1985, attached to the local phosphate quarry and administered by the ministry of industry. The Phosphate Plant in the town employs roughly 50-60 permanent workers. Production there was seriously disrupted by the UN sanctions after 1991 and the 2003 war, essentially stopped it from working. It is now operating at around 10%.

== Transport ==
It is the terminus of a branchline of the national railway system. It serves a phosphate mine.

The railroad tracks stretch all the way east to Hadithah where they connect in the south to the Persian Gulf and northward eventually to Europe. The phosphate quarry sporadically sends a trainload of raw material to Al Qaim.

== Uranium production ==
The Akashat Mine, located 420 km west of Baghdad, is a uranium ore production facility associated with the Al Qaim site. Iraq has reserves of uranium ore which continue to be mined at Akashat, on the border with Syria. The Al Qaim facility, 100 km to the north east, remains capable of ore refinement. By the mid-1980s Iraq had at least 164 tons of yellowcake, obtained at the Akashat mine and processed in Iraq at Al Qaim, a plant built by a Swiss company.

== 2013 ambush ==
On 4 March 2013, as part of both the post-U.S. withdrawal Iraqi insurgency and the Syrian civil war, an ambush took place in Akashat by the Islamic State of Iraq. There was no clear victor, but 51 of the 64 Syrian Army soldiers involved in the ambush were killed, along with 13 Iraqi troops.

== See also ==
- Iraqi Republic Railways
