= Pullman (car or coach) =

Passenger car built or operated by the Pullman Company

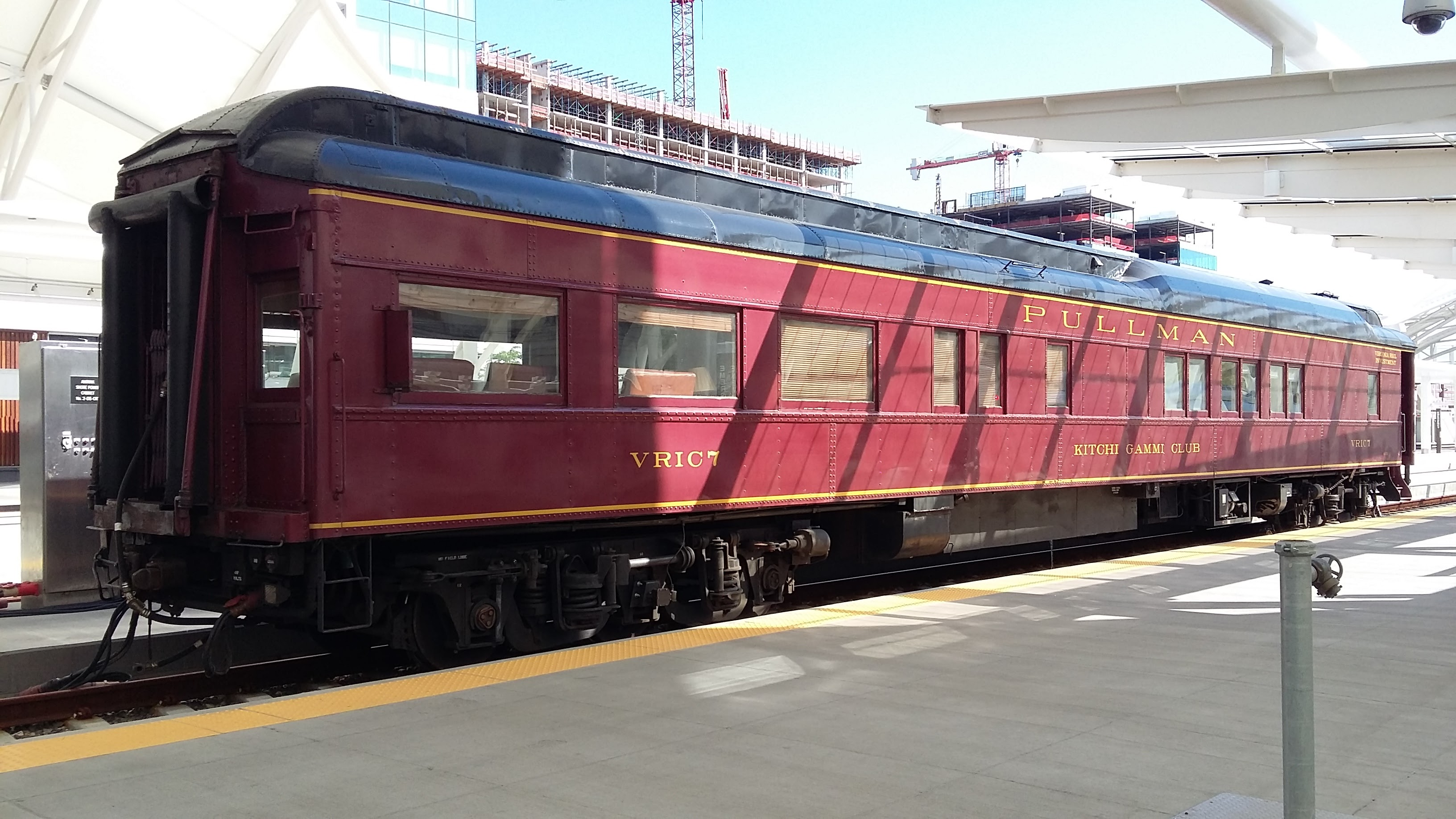
Pullman VRIC7 rail car sponsored by Kitchi Gammi Club

Pullman is the term for railroad dining cars, lounge cars, and especially sleeping cars that were built and operated by the Pullman Company (founded by George Pullman) from 1867 to December 31, 1968.

Railway dining cars in the U.S. and Europe were operated by the Pullman Company; lounge cars were operated by the Compagnie Internationale des Wagons-Lits in France, and the British Pullman Car Company in Great Britain.

== Other uses ==
- The nickname Pullman coach was used in some European cities for the first long (four-axle) electric tramcars whose appearance resembled the Pullman railway cars and that were usually more comfortable than their predecessors. Such coaches (Russian: пульмановский вагон, romanized: pul'manovsky vagon) ran in Kyiv from 1907 and in Odessa from 1912.
- In the 1920s, tramcars nicknamed Pullmanwagen in German ran in Leipzig, Cologne, Frankfurt and Zürich.

Mercedes-Benz 600 "Pullman" limousine, carrying U.S. President Carter in Liberia, 1978

- In some Western European countries in the 1930s, 1940s, and 1950s, some especially luxurious motor coaches were sometimes referred to as Auto-Pullmans.
- In 1963, the luxurious Mercedes-Benz 600 was introduced, with a range including a long wheelbase limousine version called Pullman. Later, stretched versions of regular Mercedes-Benz S-Class cars were also called Pullman.
- In Greek and Italian, the word "pullman" is used to refer to a coach bus. In Greek, it would be spelled "πούλμαν".
- In Arabic, the word "pullman" is used to refer to a coach bus in Syria. In Arabic, it would be spelled "بولمان".
- In Latin America, pullman may refer to a luxury bus as well as to a railroad sleeping car.
- In Turkish, the word “pulman” is used to refer to any passenger wagons with open seating as opposed to compartments.
- A Pullman loaf is a type of long, square bread originally developed to be baked in the small kitchens of Pullman rail cars.

== Gallery ==
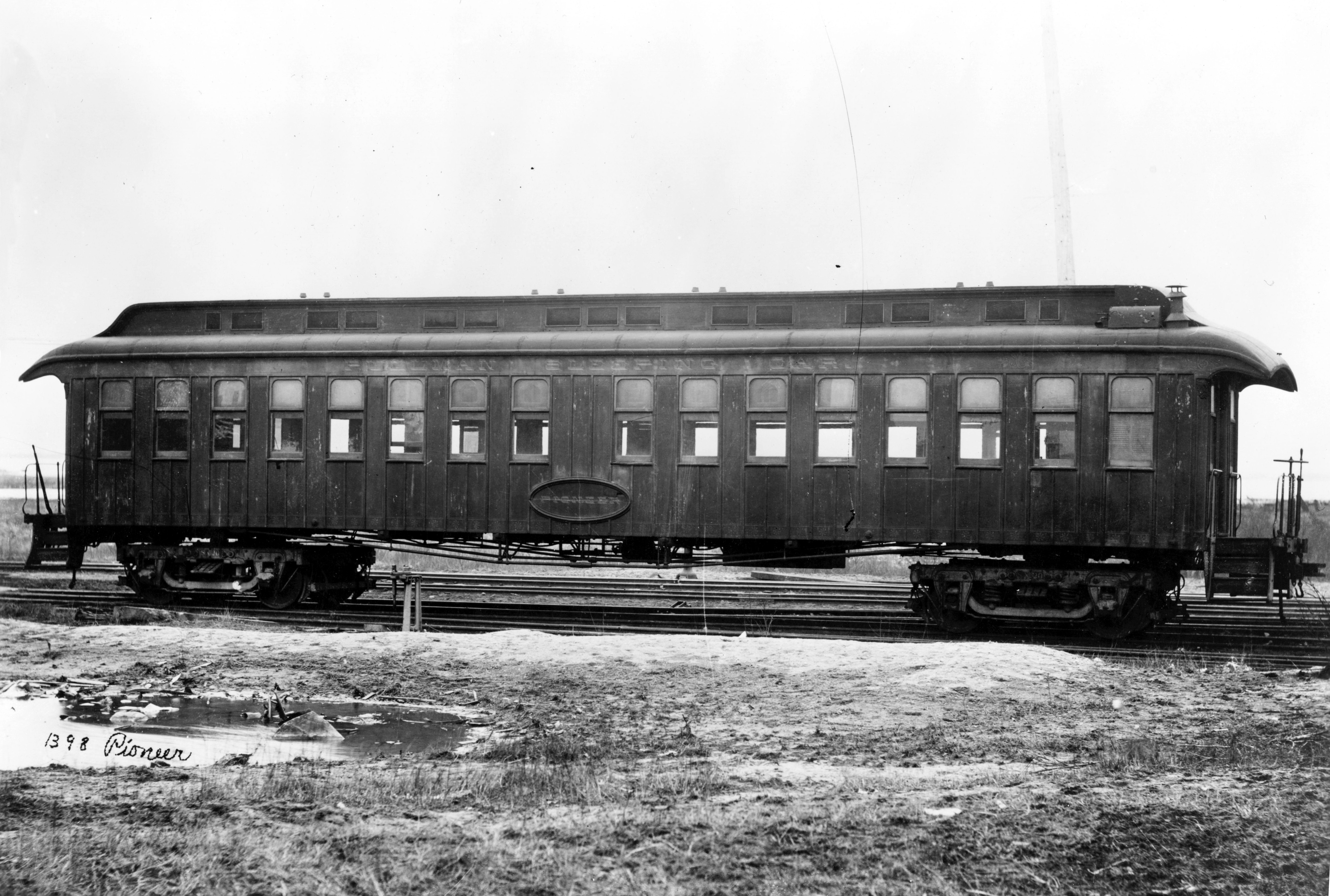
The first Pullman sleeping car

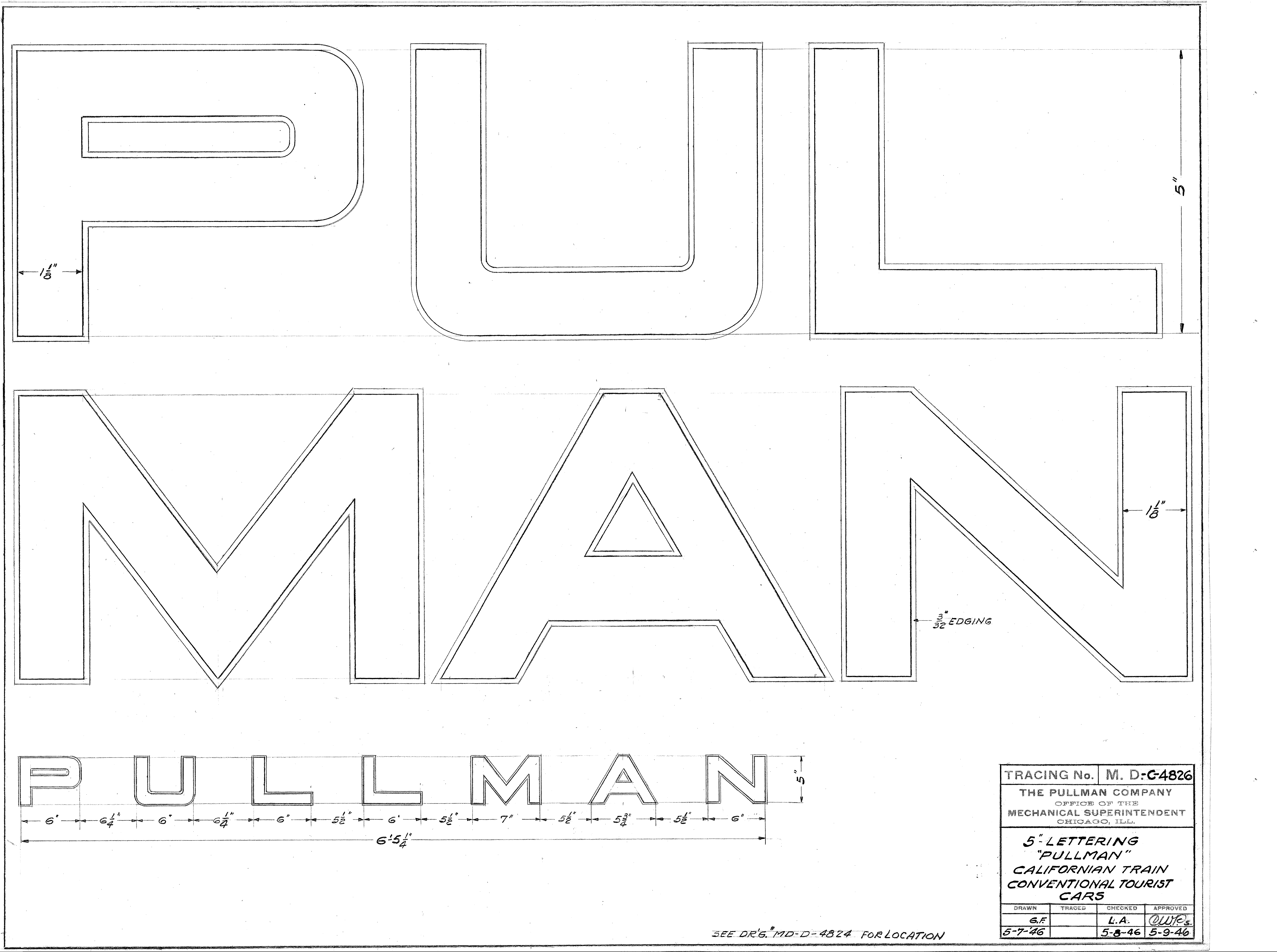
Lettering blueprint for Pullman sleeping car

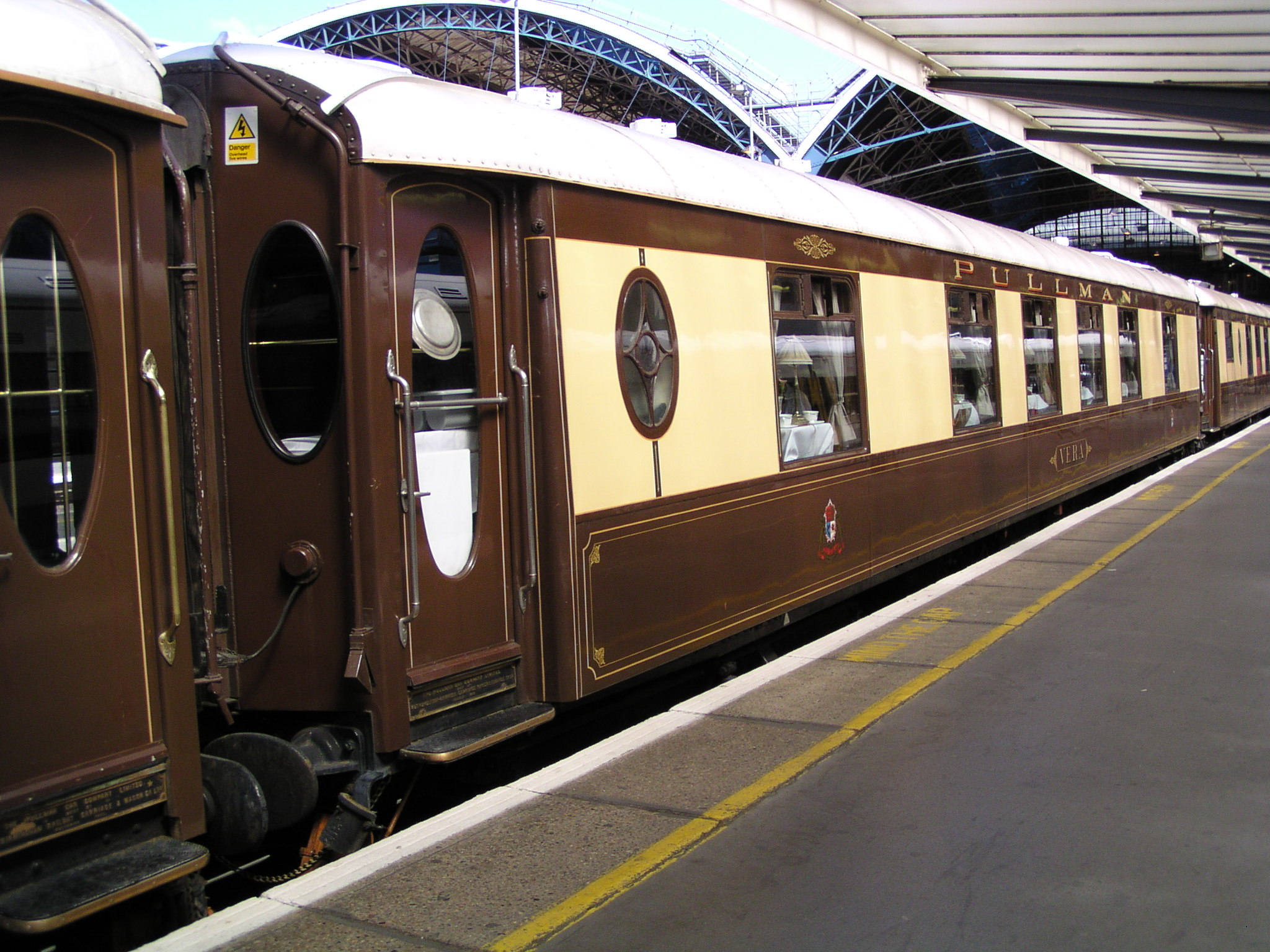
Former Brighton Belle Pullman carriage at London Victoria, now part of the Venice-Simplon Orient Express fleet

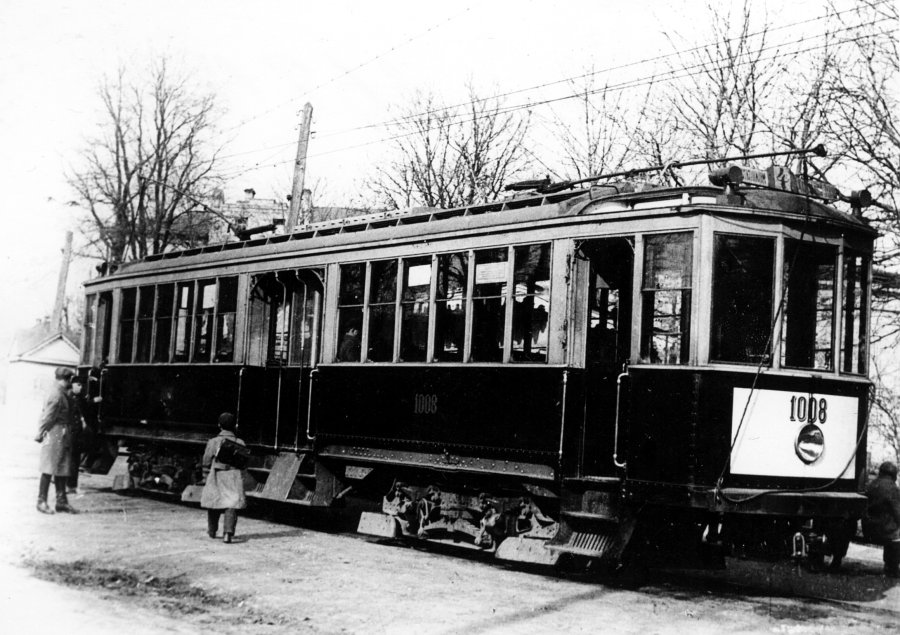
"Pullman" tramcar in Kyiv, 1930

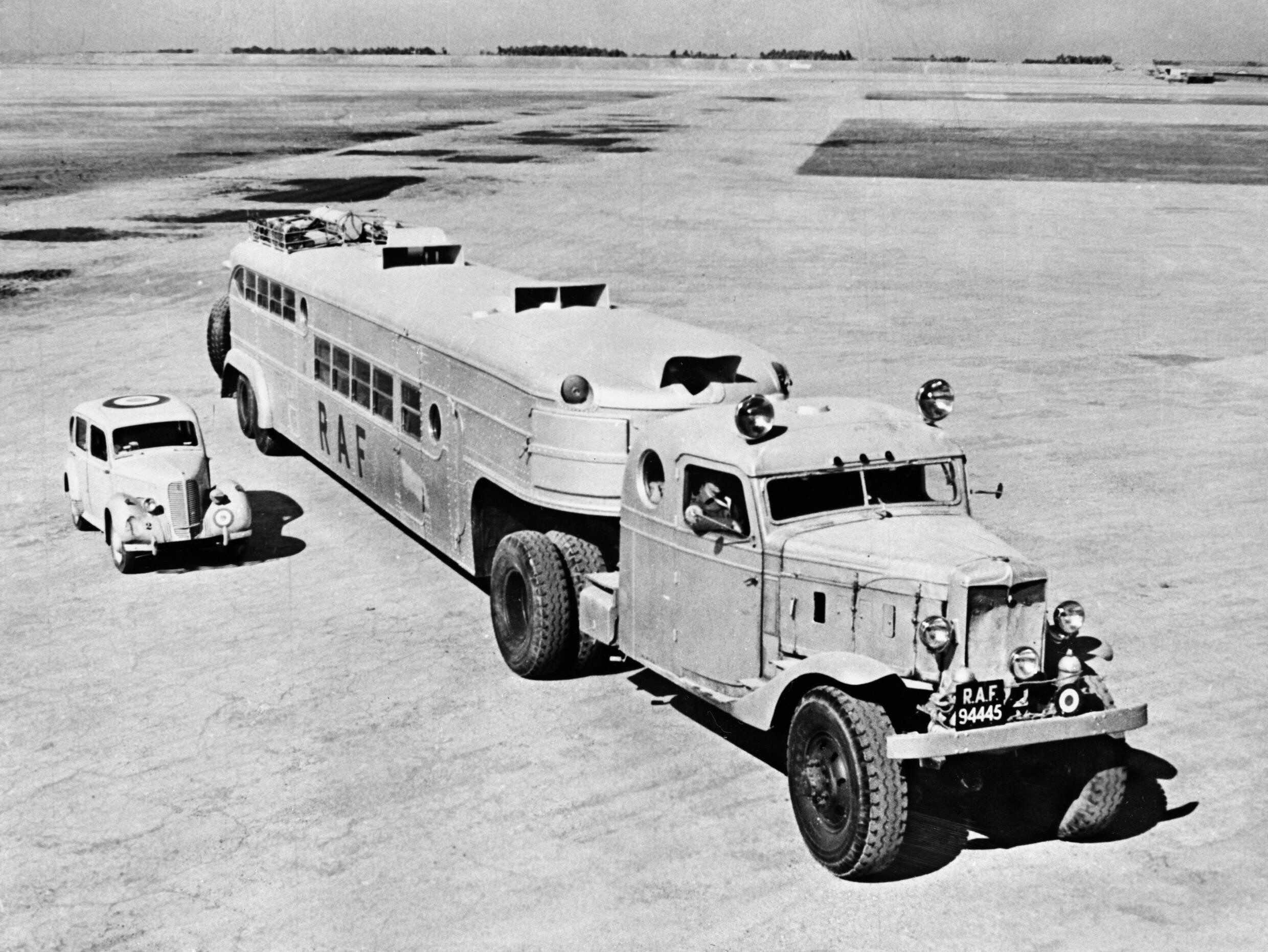
A Pullman bus of the Nairn Transport Company for the Damascus–Baghdad service

== See also ==
- Starlight Express, a train musical in which two characters are modeled on a Pullman.
- Clerestory § Transportation, Railway Coach roof design following the Pullman American influence.

== General and cited references ==
- Barger, Ralph L. (1988). A Century of Pullman Cars, Volume I, Alphabetical List. Greenberg Publishing Company.
- Barger, Ralph L. (1990). A Century of Pullman Cars, Volume II, The Palace Cars. Greenberg Publishing Company.
- Welsh, Joe; Bill Howes (2004). Travel by Pullman: a century of service. Saint Paul, MN: MBI. ISBN 0760318573. OCLC 56634363.
