= Battle of Ar-Rutbah (2016) =

2016 battle

Ar-Rutbah offensive (2016)
- Part of the War in Iraq (2013–2017) and the Anbar campaign (2015–2016)
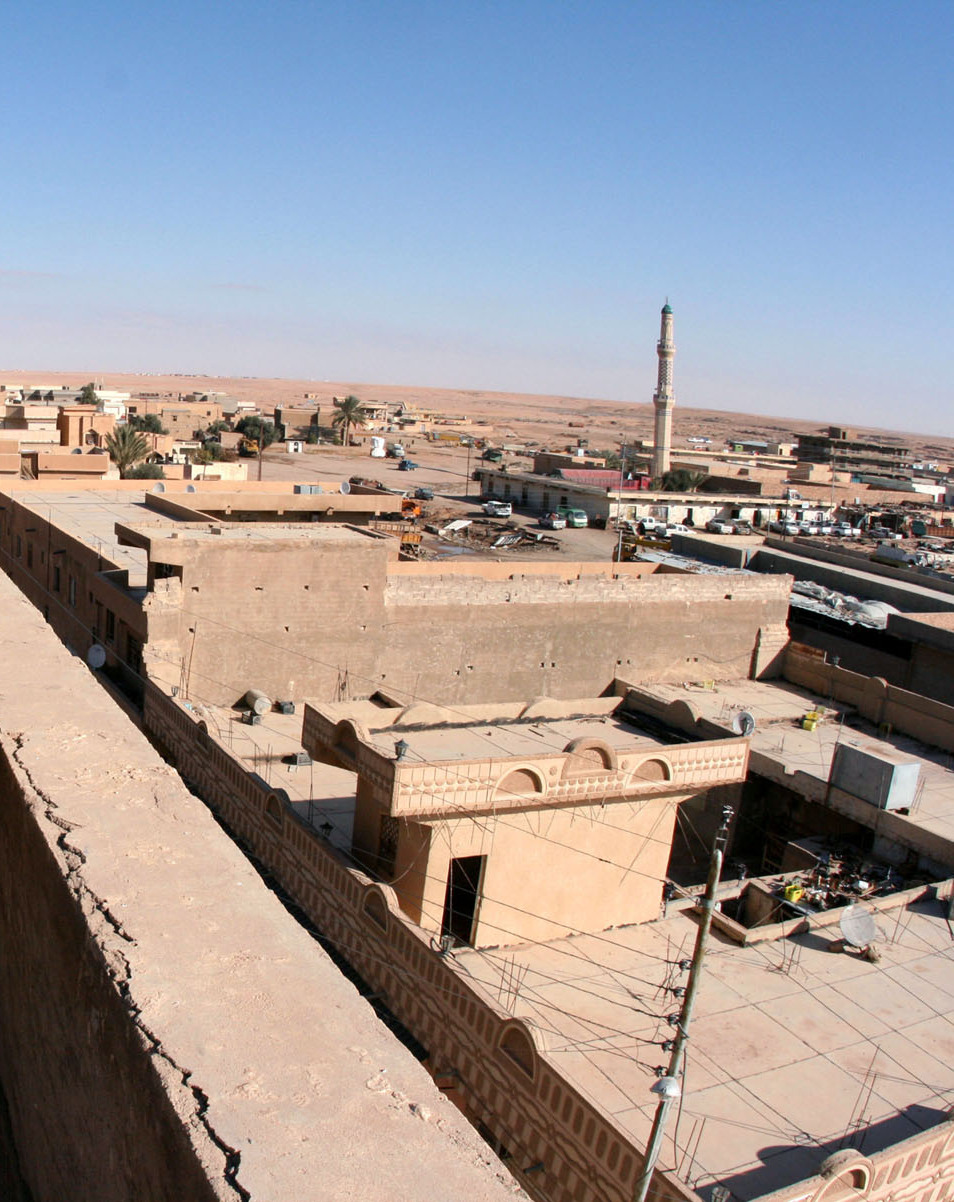
- Ar-Rutbah in 2009.
Date	16–18 May 2016 (2 days)
Location	Ar-Rutba District, Anbar Governorate, Iraq
Result	Iraqi government victory: Iraqi Army recapture Ar-Rutbah District/Town

Belligerents
Iraq: Iraqi security forces; Armed Forces; Federal Police; Local Sunni tribes; Popular Mobilization Forces; Air support CJTF-OIR	Islamic State of Iraq and the Levant

Strength
1,000+ fighters	100–400 militants

Casualties and losses
4 killed, 5 wounded	100+ killed

The Battle of Ar-Rutbah was a military offensive in Iraq launched by the Iraqi Army to recapture the strategic town of Ar-Rutbah from ISIL, along with the rest of the Ar-Rutba District.

== Background ==
On March 13, a senior Iraqi general reported that ISIL had fully withdrawn from the city of Ar-Rutbah to Al-Qa'im, beginning the night before. This withdrawal was confirmed by a member of Anbar's security council, and it was also reported that ISIL had abandoned the town of Kabisa and withdrawn from Hīt to some extent, leading to Iraqi warplanes bombing the retreating militants. This was the first time ISIL withdrew from a major urban area without an actual fight, following recent battlefield losses for ISIL in Syria and in the Anbar Province, including a recent offensive on Hīt. However, ISIL returned to the town on the following day.

== The offensive ==
On May 16, following the killing of local ISIL commander Abu Waheeb, the Iraqi Army launched an offensive to reclaim Ar-Rutbah and the rest of the Ar-Rutba District. The Iraqi Army attacked the town from three directions. A US official stated that Ar-Rutbah wasn't as well defended by ISIL as Ramadi or Fallujah, with estimates of 100 to several hundred ISIL militants based in the town. On May 17, the commander of Anbar Operations, Major General Hadi Rseg announced that Iraqi Army fully recaptured Ar-Rutbah, and its surrounding areas in the Ar-Rutbah District. During the clashes, at least 4 Iraqi soldiers were killed and 5 more were wounded, while around 100 ISIL fighters were killed. The town holds strategic value as it lies on key transit routes between Iraq and Jordan, and its recapture denied ISIL a "critical support zone."

== See also ==
- Battle of Ramadi (2014–15)
- Siege of Fallujah (2016)
- Mosul offensive (2016)
- List of wars and battles involving ISIL
