= Wadi Hauran =

Wadi in Al Anbar Governorate, Iraq

Coordinates: 33°58′52″N 42°33′23″E

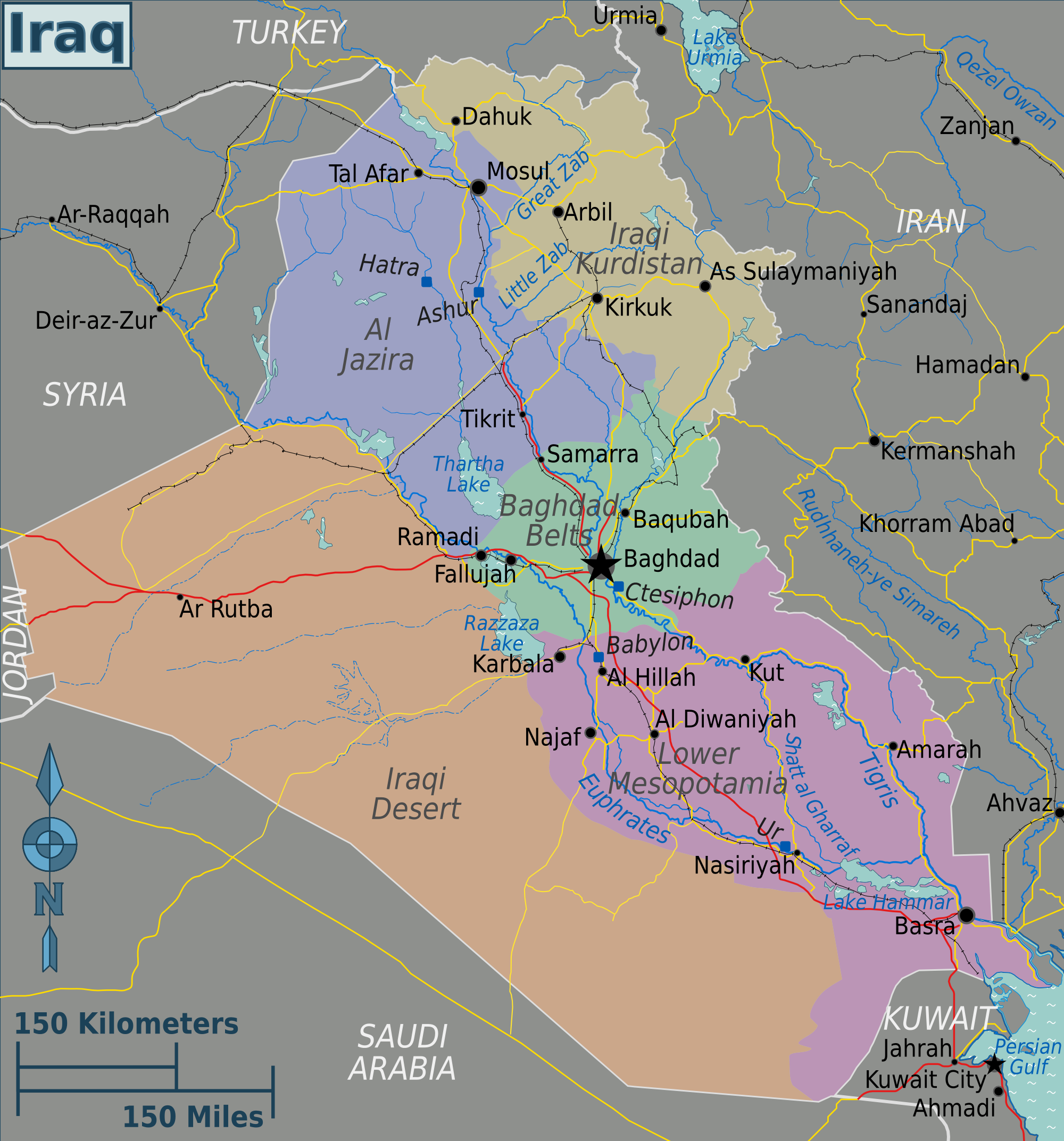
Iraq regions map

Wadi Hauran (also Wadi Houran, Wādī Ḩawrān Arabic: وادي حوران) is the longest wadi in Iraq. Located in Al Anbar Governorate west of Iraq, at Latitude 33.0333°, Longitude 40.2500° it's roughly midway between Damascus and Baghdad near the town of Rutba, it stretches for 350 kilometres (220 mi) from the Iraq–Saudi border to the Euphrates river near Haditha.

Often the term "Wadi Hauran" is used to refer to the larger geographic area including the wadi itself and its surrounding hills, in addition to small wadis branching from it.

Bounded by steep banks and at a depth varying between 150 and 200 metres (490 and 660 ft) the valley is the deepest in Iraq. Although it is usually dry there are oases located in the eastern part of the valley, and in rainy seasons can become a watercourse.

== Geography ==
The landscape in this part of the Iraq desert is undulating and barren. The wadi flows from near the Jordanian border and traverses east through the Iraq desert till it meets the Euphrates near the town of Alaleya. The wadi collects water from an area encompassing most of Anbar province, and is at an elevation of 83 meters.

Basically Wadi Hauran was a river in the past but it dried after the end of the Last glacial period. The wadi offers a good pastures for the Bedouin and their cattle.

=== Flora and fauna ===
Wadi Hauran serves as a good breeding ground for many wild animals such as hare, Rüppell's fox, gray wolf and goitered gazelle, while the surrounding cliffs of the wadi constitute a good breeding ground for resident birds and immigrants like the bustard, sandgrouse, saker falcon, and Egyptian vulture. Flora in Wadi Hauran include many desert and semi desert plants such as Artemisia, shrub, Astragalus Achillea, Acacia, and Alhagi.

=== Built environment ===
The main settlement in Wadi Hauran is Ar-Rutbah, an Iraqi town and seat of Ar-Rutba District. Its name means 'wet land' in Arabic because it can receive 114.3 mm of rain per year. Its total current population is 22,370 inhabitants, all of them Arabs and Sunnis. People earn their living by agriculture and small business.

The wadi has three dams constructed in the wadi to collect rainwater for grazing sheep and camels during the summer. They are the Hussayniyah dam built in the 1990s, the Rutba dam, and the Hauran barrage.

== History ==
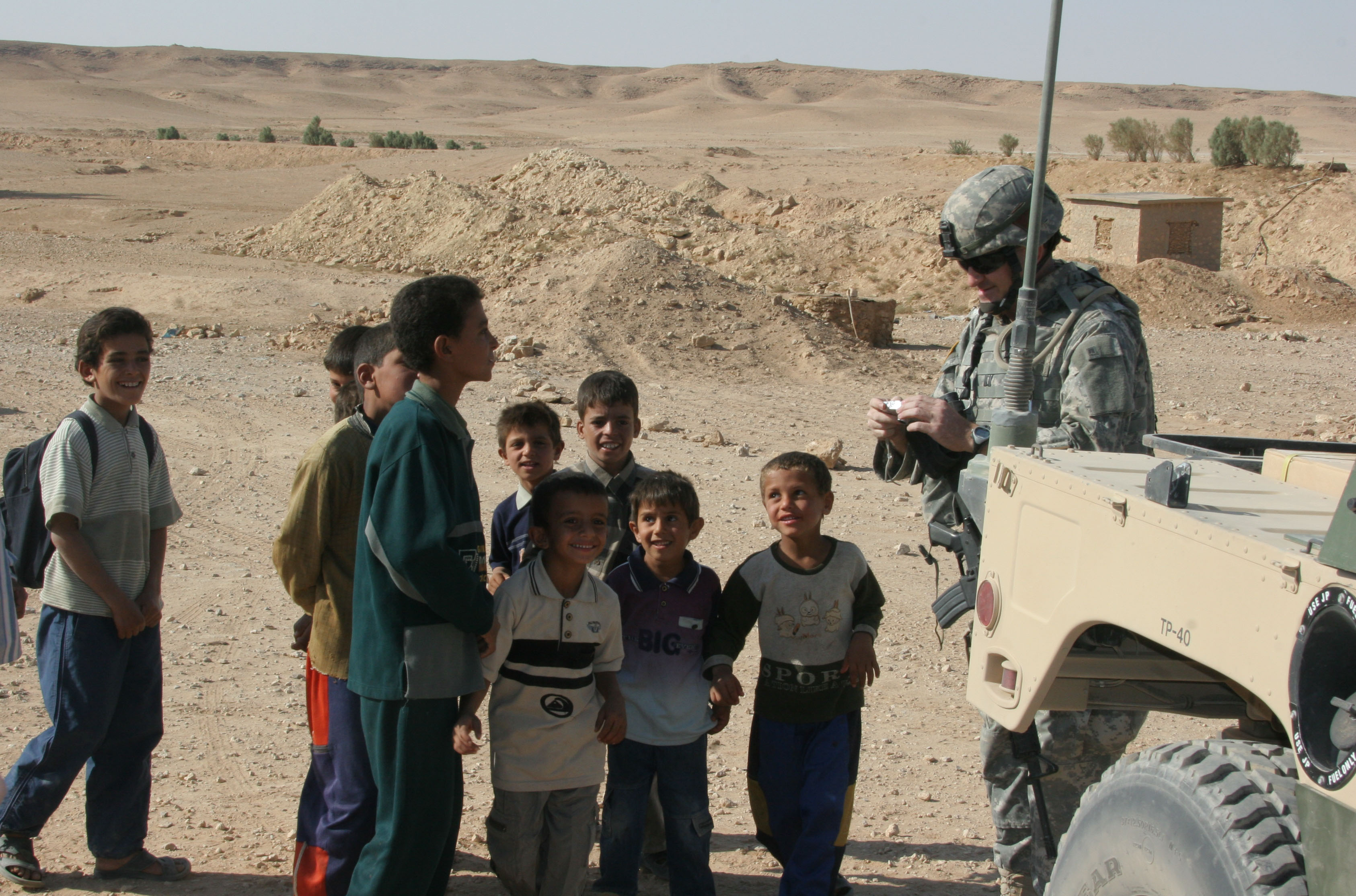
US soldier with children near Wādī Ḩawrān

The wadi was mentioned by Yaqut al-Hamawi and possibly Al Tabari and was traditionally the territory of the al-Qayn tribes. In the 19th century many Druze fleeing persecution entered the western part of the catchment, and in the 1870s the wadi was captured by Jabal Shammar. On 27 March 1917 British forces captured 2,000 Turkish troops at the wadi.

=== Recent insurgency ===
Since 2003, Wadi Hauran has been an insurgent stronghold and among more dangerous areas in Iraq due to its location in the midst of the desert, away from any paved roads. Many clashes have taken place in the Wadi. The most serious attack to date occurred on 20 December 2013, resulted in the killing of 24 combatants, including the Commander of the 7th Division, Brigadier Mohamed al-Karawi, his assistant Brigadier Noman Mohamed, the Commander of Anbar Intelligence Body, eight army officers and 13 soldiers.

Then in 2007 the bridge over the wadi was destroyed by an improvised explosive device.

On 22 June 2014, the town of Ar-Rutbah was attacked by ISIL militants, who came from Wadi Hauran by 50 armed vehicles, and occupied the town after sporadic clashes with Iraqi Security Forces.

Despite Iraqi Prime Minister announcing the defeat of ISIL in December 2017, the group retains natural hideouts in its gorges.
