= Nukhayb =

An Nukhayb النخيب
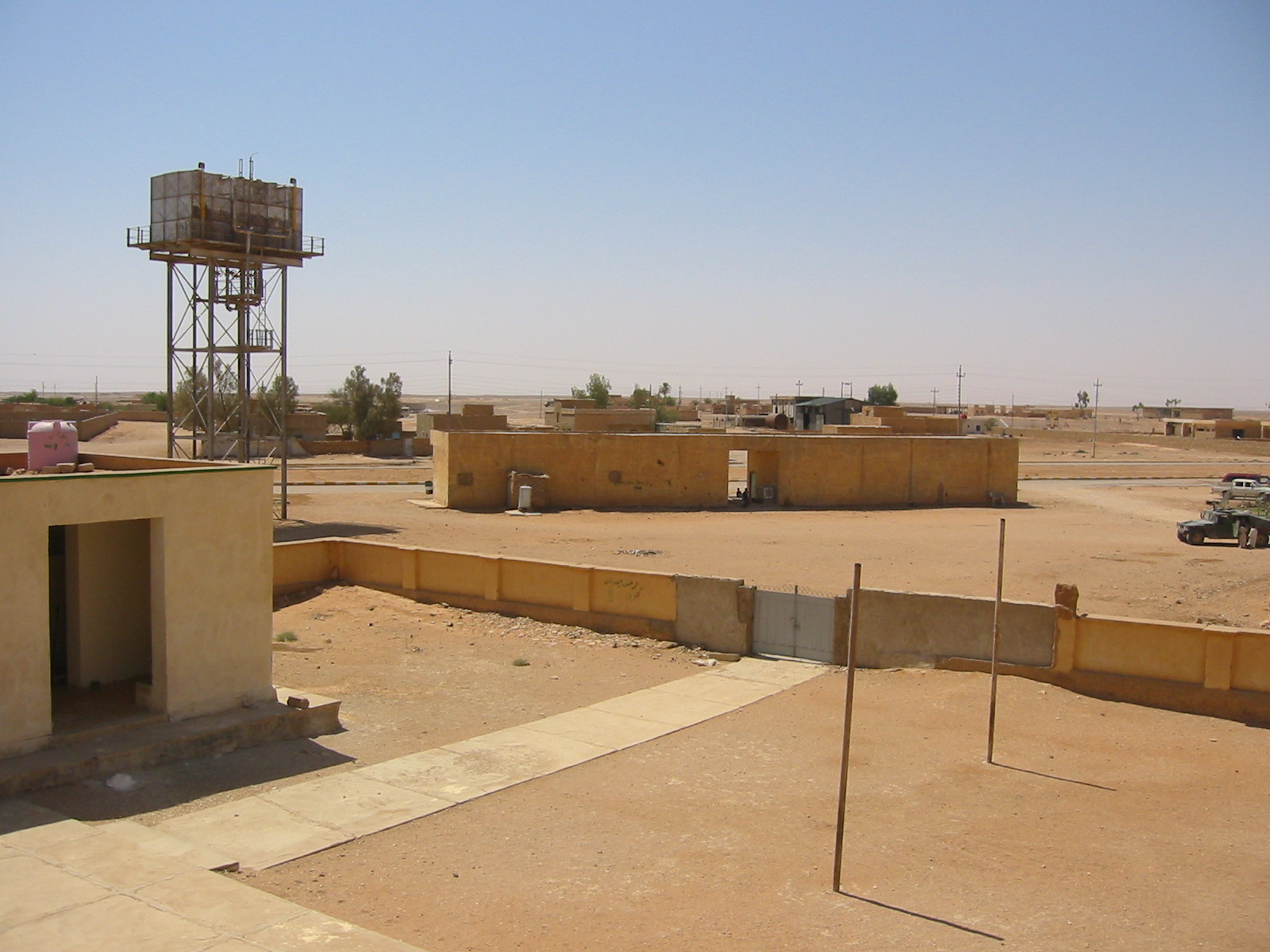
- View of town from the roof of the school

- Location within Iraq
- Coordinates: 32°2′28″N 42°15′17″E
- Country: Iraq
- Governorate: Anbar Governorate
- District: Ar-Rutba District

Area
  - Land: 48,790 km^{2} (18,840 sq mi)

Population (2018)
  - Total: 3,571
  - Density: 0.07319/km^{2} (0.1896/sq mi)
- Time zone: UTC+3 (GMT+3)
- Postal code: 31016

An Nukhayb (Arabic: النخيب, alt. Nukhaib, Nkheeb) is a town in Al Anbar Governorate, Iraq. Prior to the 1940s and during a short period in the 1970s, the town was administered by the Karbala Governorate. There has been conflict regarding to which governorate the town should belong.

Nukhayb is located on the Al-Abyad Wadi at the largest road junction in the region, with roads going south to the Saudi Arabian border, north to the Ramadi–Jordan highway, and northeast to Karbala. Nukhayb is the last Iraqi town before pilgrims cross into Saudi Arabia on their pilgrimage to Mecca. It has two satellite villages to the north, Habbariya (28 km) and Kesrah (51 km). Mudaysis Air Base is located 50 km to the northwest of Nukhayb.

== History ==
During the British Mandate, John Bagot Glubb established a post at the well of Nukhayb to allow the Iraqi government to control its western deserts. Throughout 1929, sections of the Royal Air Force Armoured Cars served outpost duty in Nukhayb.

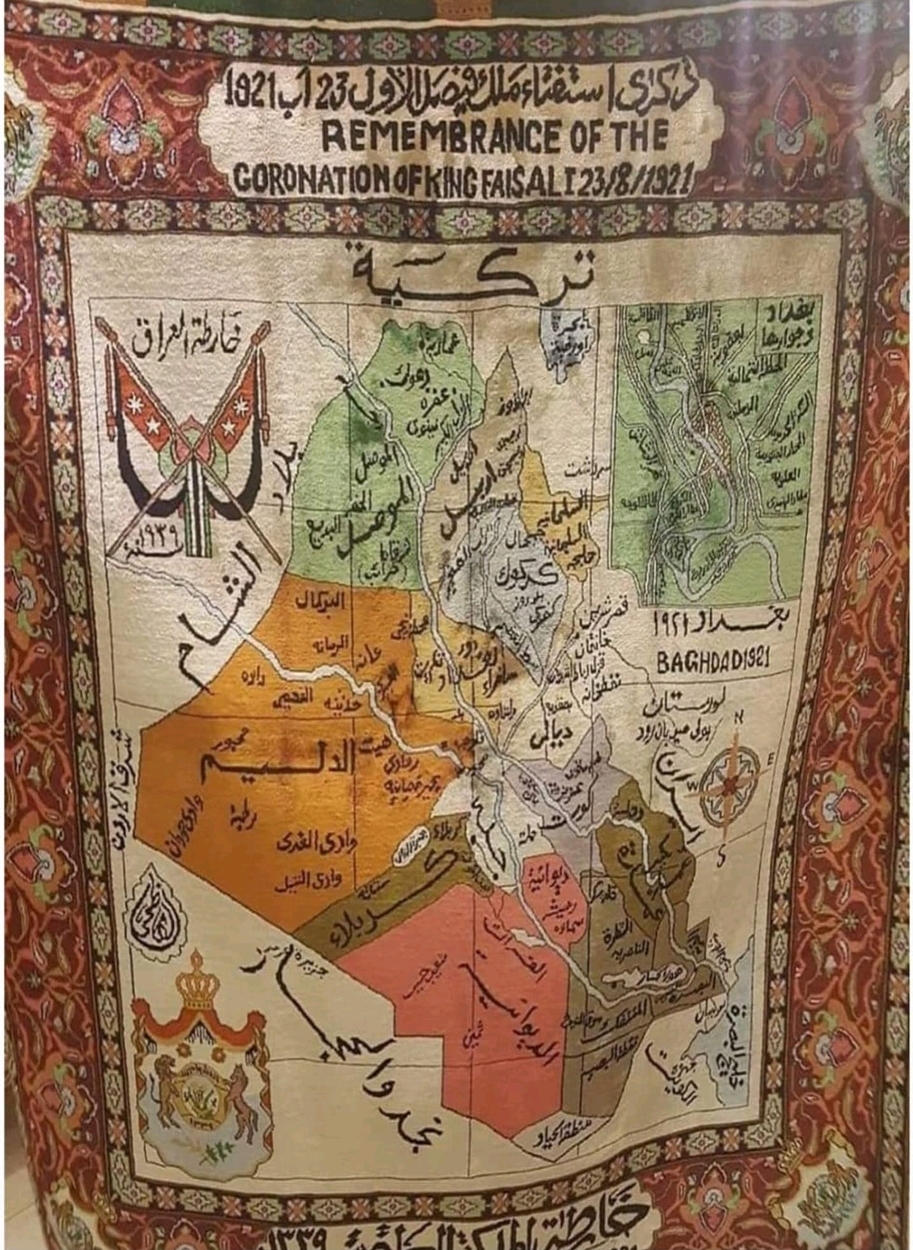
Mandatory Iraq, 1921.

In 1960, Nukhayb was upgraded from village to subdistrict.

In 2010, Qatari royal Khalifa bin Abdulla bin Hassan bin Ali al-Thani was killed in Nukhayb when his GMC hit a bump and rolled during a hunting trip.

In September 2011, 22 Shia pilgrims en route from Karbala to Damascus were stopped at a fake checkpoint near Nukhayb, and then killed by gunmen affiliated with the Islamic State of Iraq. In another false checkpoint attack, 14 Iraqi border guards were killed by Islamic State of Iraq and the Levant militants in June 2013.

Reports in summer of 2014 indicated that the Iraqi Army and the Islamic State of Iraq and the Levant (ISIS) clashed in the town, with government troops "fleeing" towards Karbala. ISIS was reported as having taken control of the town in late June of that year; the Iraqi government forces stated that they regained control of the town in late August of that year. There were several attempts by ISIS to recapture the town in the following years however they ultimately failed to do so.

Nukhayb is mainly populated by the Al-Shammari and Al-Anezi tribes.

== Climate ==
In Nukhayb, there is a desert climate. Most rain falls in the winter. The Köppen-Geiger climate classification is BWh. The average annual temperature in Nukhayb is 21.6 °C (70.9 °F). About 57 mm (2.24 in) of precipitation falls annually.

Climate data for Samawah
| Month | Jan | Feb | Mar | Apr | May | Jun | Jul | Aug | Sep | Oct | Nov | Dec | Year |
|---|---|---|---|---|---|---|---|---|---|---|---|---|---|
| Mean daily maximum °C (°F) | 15.4 (59.7) | 18.1 (64.6) | 22.8 (73.0) | 27.8 (82.0) | 33.8 (92.8) | 39.6 (103.3) | 41.7 (107.1) | 41.6 (106.9) | 38.2 (100.8) | 31.2 (88.2) | 23.2 (73.8) | 17.4 (63.3) | 29.2 (84.6) |
| Mean daily minimum °C (°F) | 3.0 (37.4) | 4.6 (40.3) | 8.0 (46.4) | 13.1 (55.6) | 18.5 (65.3) | 22.4 (72.3) | 24.5 (76.1) | 24.0 (75.2) | 20.5 (68.9) | 15.8 (60.4) | 9.5 (49.1) | 3.6 (38.5) | 14.0 (57.1) |
| Average precipitation mm (inches) | 19 (0.7) | 11 (0.4) | 4 (0.2) | 5 (0.2) | 4 (0.2) | 0 (0) | 0 (0) | 0 (0) | 1 (0.0) | 3 (0.1) | 6 (0.2) | 4 (0.2) | 57 (2.2) |
Source: Climate-Data.org, Climate data
