= Ar-Rutbah =

Ar-Rutbah, Iraq Arabic: الرطبة
- Town
- Ar-Rutbah
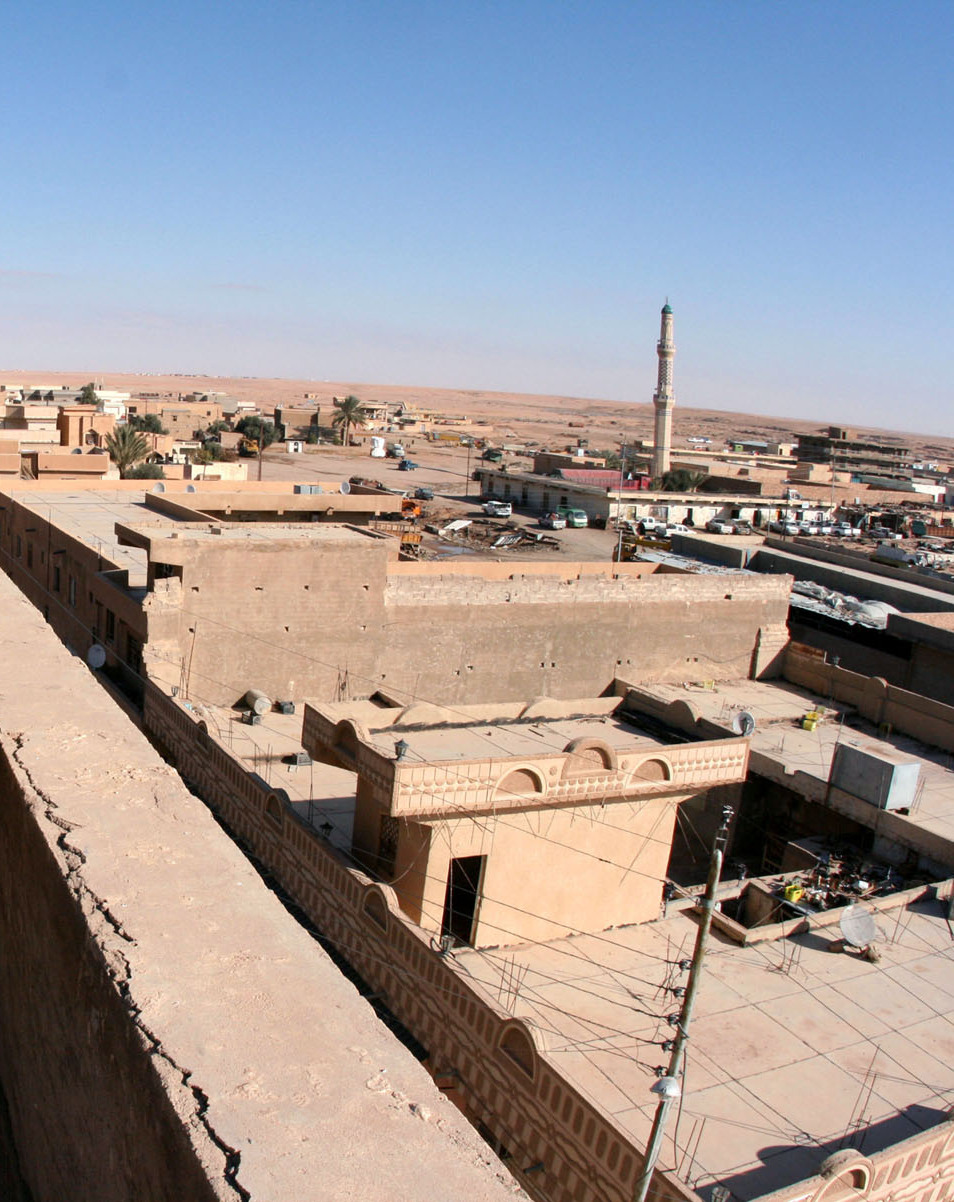
- A rooftop view of Ar-Rutbah on 1 January 2009

- Location within Iraq
- Coordinates: 33°2′17″N 40°17′4″E
- Country: Iraq
- Province: Al-Anbar
- District: Al-Rutbah

Government
  - Mayor: Imad al-Dulaimi

Population (2018)
  - Total: 28,400
- Time zone: UTC+3 (GMT+3)
- Postal code: 31011

Ar-Rutbah (Arabic: الرطبة ar-Ruṭba, also Romanized Rutba, Rutbah) is an Iraqi town in western Al Anbar province, predominantly inhabited by Sunni Arabs. The population is approximately 28,400. It occupies a strategic location on the Amman–Baghdad road, and the Kirkuk–Haifa oil pipeline. Considered a "wet spot", it receives 114.3 mm (4.5 inches) of rain annually, and is located on a high plateau. It has been described as "the most isolated town of any size in Iraq."

Ar-Rutbah began as a rest stop for Imperial Airways flights in the early 20th century, and also served as a water stop for the Nairn Transport Company. In December 1934, sixteen kilometers south of Ar-Rutbah, the famous Dutch plane Uiver crashed, with all onboard killed. During the Anglo-Iraqi War in 1941, Ar-Rutbah was the site of a clash between British forces, including the Arab Legion, and forces loyal to Rashid Ali al-Gaylani.

== History ==
=== British administration ===
During the British administration of Iraq, known as Mandatory Iraq, Rutbah Wells, as it was then known, was a rest stop for Imperial Airways flights from the UK to India and the Persian Gulf. Imperial Airways used an old fort at Rutbah Wells as a resthouse—however, "a common complaint in winter was the cold, for the builders at Rutbah Wells had, unaccountably, made no provision for fireplaces or chimneys." Aircraft were en route from Cairo, to Gaza, to Rutbah Wells, to Baghdad. According to research conduct by Lucy Budd, of Loughborough University, the airstrip and rest house at Rutbah Wells were specifically built for Imperial Airways by the Iraqi government, and assigned a detachment of armed soldiers to defend against hostile tribes. One passenger wrote of the "unforgettable experience of arriving at the most desolate and extraordinary hostelry in the world", while another remarked on "the absurdity of coming down [in the morning] to an English ham and egg breakfast in the middle of the desert". Passengers were not expected to embark or disembark at Rutbah Wells.

The town was also a water stop on the overland drive from Baghdad to Damascus by the Nairn Transport Company, known as the Nairn Way. Travellers who stopped in Rutbah stayed at the fort. Among those who stopped at Rutbah Wells when following the Nairn Way was Mary Bruins Allison.

In 1927, the British built a fort at Rutbah. In 1929, when Francis Chichester completed his solo flight to New Zealand in a de Havilland DH.60 Moth, he stopped at Rutbah Wells. In his autobiography, The Lonely Sea and the Sky, Chichester described it as follows: "Rutbah Wells was a romantic spot in the middle of the desert, a large square fort with buildings backed up inside to the high walls. There were camel caravans inside, and a squad of Iraqi infantry." He also wrote that there was an Imperial Airways mechanic stationed at the fort, who helped him repair his plane, and that he stayed the night in an Iraqi officer's room.

On 19 December 1934, the aircraft Uiver was on a non-scheduled flight from Amsterdam to Batavia (now Jakarta). On 21 December, sixteen kilometers south of Rutbah Wells, the plane was found, completely destroyed, by an RAF pilot. The plane was a KLM DC-2. It was the plane's first flight after coming second in the MacRobertson Air Race that took place in October 1934. All four cockpit crew and three passengers were killed, including Dutch media magnate Dominique Willem Berretty. An investigation into the crash determined that it was likely the bad weather that caused the crash, and that "the bad flying characteristics of the DC-2 during heavy rain were suspected."

=== Anglo-Iraqi War ===
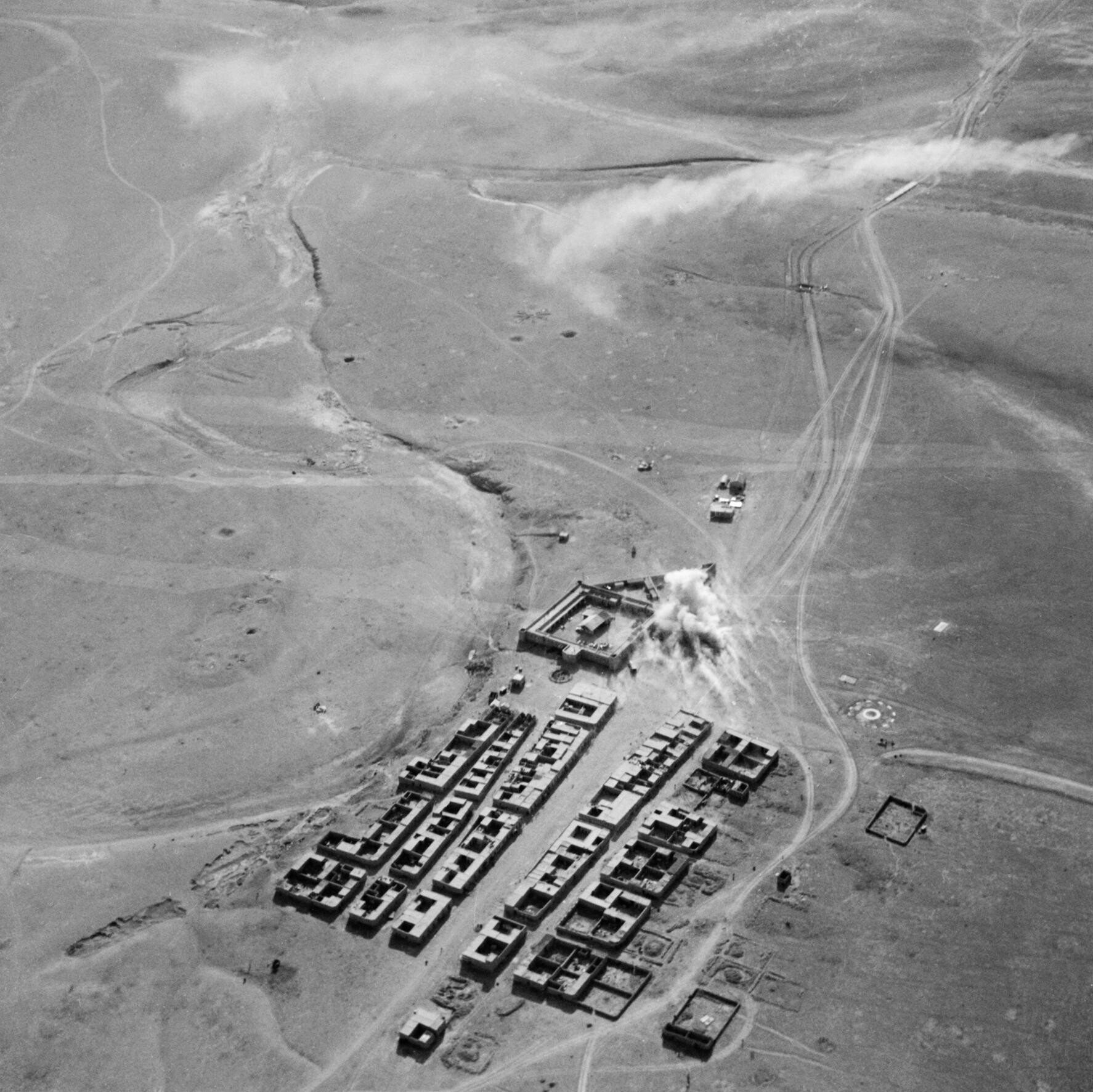
Assault on Rutbah Fort in 1941

During the Anglo-Iraqi War in 1941, forces loyal to Rashid Ali took control of the Fort on 2 May 1941. As a response bombs were dropped by RAF Blenheim V bombers from No. 203 Squadron RAF on and around the fort. The fort was retaken by Arab Legion forces with support from No. 2 Armoured Car Company RAF after the fort defenders left overnight on 10 May.

=== Gulf War ===
Prior to the Gulf War in 1990, the Iraqi government installed an Intercept Operations Center (IOC) in Ar-Rutbah, which was designed to provide local air defence control. The various IOCs were linked through an extensive optical fiber communications net. The IOCs were subordinate to the National Air Defense Operations Center (ADOC), based in Baghdad, that controlled air defense nationally. In the late 1980s, the Iraqi government also expanded its facility at Ar-Rutbah to produce acids and other chemical compounds. It may also have established a complex called 'Project 9320' in the area, which had three factories to produce secondary chemicals used in manufacturing nerve gas.

On 22 January 1991, an RAF Tornado (ZA467, part of No. 16 Squadron) crashed into the ground at Ar-Rutbah whilst on a low level ground attack mission. Both the pilot, Squadron Leader Gary Lennox, and the co-pilot, Squadron Leader Paul Weeks, were killed. It has been reported that they were attacking a radar site. It has also been suggested that the cause of the crash was either problems with night vision gear or flashes from anti aircraft artillery causing distractions. Russian and Iraqi sources claim that this aircraft was shot down by an Iraqi Mikoyan MiG-29 armed with R-60 (missile) piloted by Jameel Sayhood, who later crashed his plane while maneuvering McDonnell Douglas F-15 Eagle piloted by Cesar Rodriguez (pilot).

=== U.S. occupation ===
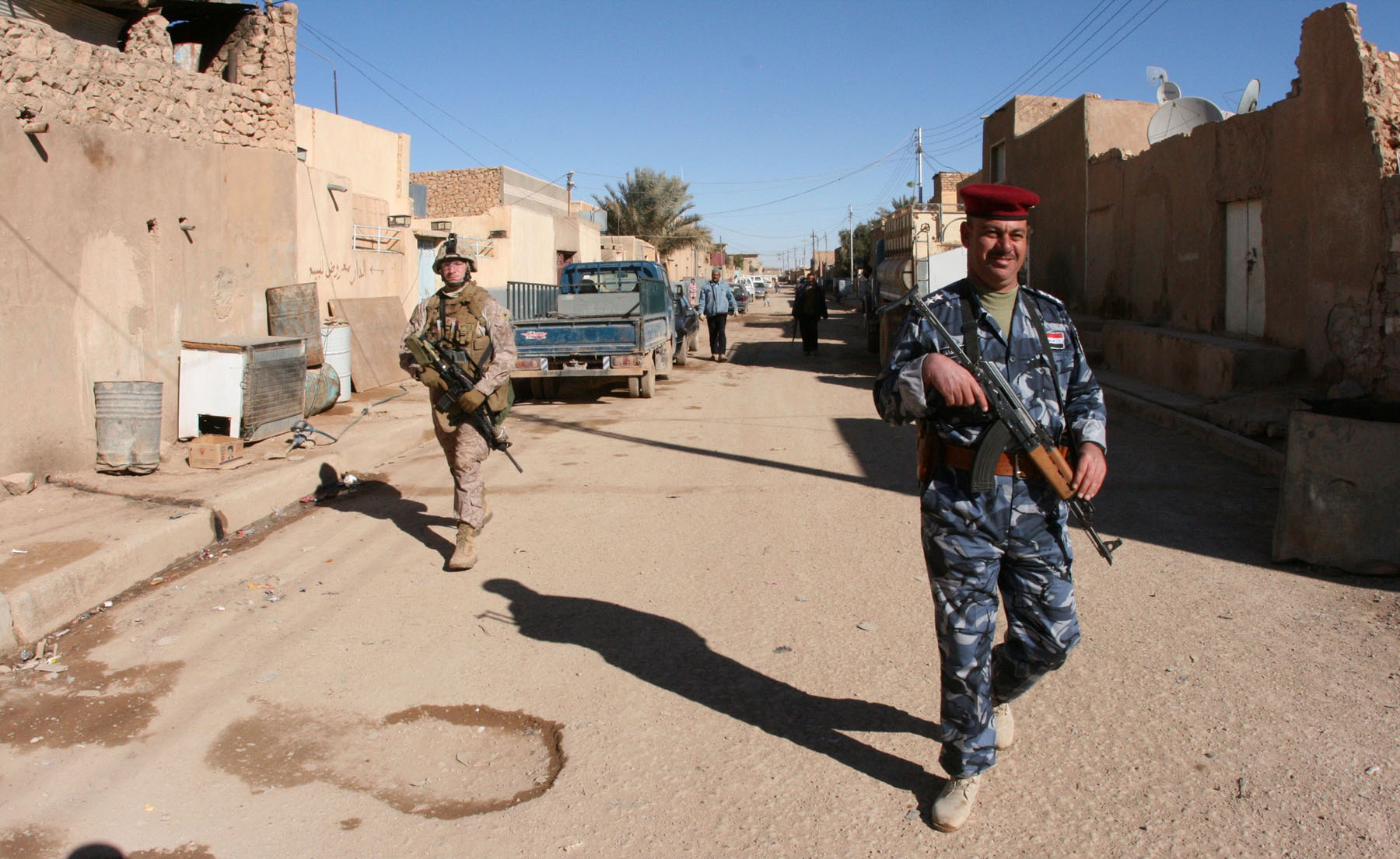
An Iraqi soldier from the Provisional Security Forces participate in a joint security patrol in Rutbah

Following the 2003 Invasion of Iraq, on 9 April 2003, United States Army Special Forces under the command of Major James A. Gavrilis approached the town. The Fedayeen Saddam still occupied it, and every time Gavrilis' men approached, "Ar Rutbah became a hornet's nest, and small-arms fire turned into machine gun and rocket fire." Gavrilis opened channels of communication with those inside the town, attempting to send the message that they "cared more about the people of Ar Rutbah than did the Fedayeen." Eventually they managed to enter the town and were not fired upon. They cleared known enemy positions and Gavrilis located the police station, which he opted to make his company headquarters. Two hours after their arrival, Gavrilis summoned the civil administrators, chief of police, and tribal leaders of the town to discuss the future civil administration of it.

After the Special Forces left the town, the US Army's 3rd Armored Cavalry Regiment took over responsibility for the area and conducted operations from an outpost approximately 10 miles west, known as FOB Buzz, previously a small Iraqi military installation near the abandoned H3 Airfield. An Army Captain assigned to FOB Buzz was charged and court-martialed for staging mock executions of Iraqi prisoners.

In 2004, Marines from Regimental Combat Team 7 relieved the Army soldiers and took control of the town, resolving to engage the populace more proactively. By July 2004, FOB Buzz was renamed Camp Korean Village (also known as Camp KV), serving as a Marine logistical support base. The base served as a regional air field, convoy rest stop, shock trauma hospital and headquarters of the local Marine garrison. The primary military objectives of the Marine units assigned there were to disrupt the flow of insurgent fighters and weapons from the Jordanian and Syrian borders. The adjacent borders entry points and highways were seen as a key route for the entry of foreign fighters and weapons en route towards what the American military command referred to as the Sunni Triangle. The base is believed to be named after the historical lineage of the Marine Corps 7th Marine Regiment who fought during the Korean war (as also did the 5th Marine Regiment);

On 26 January 2005, a Marine CH-53E Super Stallion helicopter crashed outside of town, killing 30 Marines and one Navy corpsman. This was the single deadliest day for American forces in the Iraq conflict. The cause of the crash was a severe wind storm that had come upon them unexpectedly. In 2005, James Vandenberg, a 'combat architect', drew up plans for a new hospital in Ar-Rutbah, as their previous hospital had been destroyed back in 2003. Construction began in September 2005. Day-to-day Marine operations in the city from August, 2004 to March, 2005 were outlined in "A Semester in the Sandbox: A Marine Reservist's Iraq War Journal".

On the early morning of 4 January 2006, an Iraqi citizen, Adnan Eid Abbass, died in US custody en route from his home in Ar-Rutbah to Camp Korean Village. By March 2006, the city was being guarded by elements of the 3rd Light Armored Reconnaissance Battalion (LAR) and an Iraqi rifle company from the 3d Brigade, 7th Infantry Division, Iraqi Army. U.S. and Iraqi forces had built a 7-foot (2.1 m)-high and 20-foot (6.1 m)-wide berm in order to restrict access into the city from all but 3 guarded vehicle checkpoints. This was done to restrict weapons and explosives smuggling into the city and force insurgent elements to hide weapons caches in the open desert, as well as reduce the number of roadside bombs inside the populated areas.

In July 2006, increased violence and lawlessness in Baghdad, forced the transfer of the 4-14 Cavalry Squadron, U.S. Army, from the cities of Rawah and Anah in the northern Anbar province to Baghdad in order to augment security there. The gap in forces was replaced, initially, with personnel and resources from 3rd LAR in Rutbah.

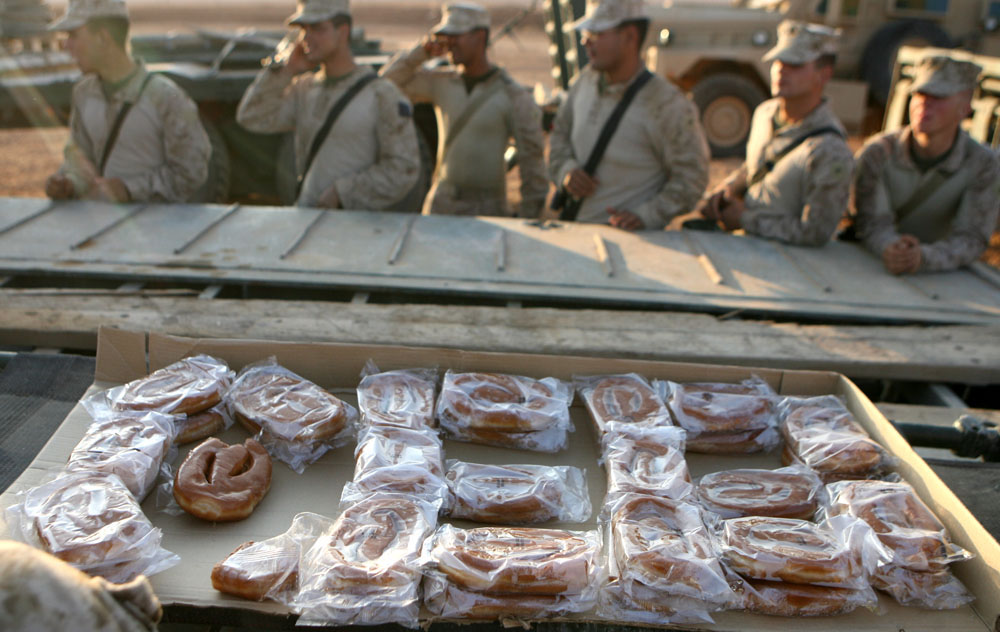
U.S. Marines celebrate the Marine Corps' birthday by eating doughnuts at Ar-Rutbah in 2009

In September 2006, Rutbah was once again handed over to 2nd LAR by 3rd LAR.

In early 2007, the Rutbah government progressed in the transition to providing its own security. The town's efforts included recruiting approximately 200 men to send to an Iraqi Police training academy to increase counterinsurgency practices.

In March 2009 the Marines transferred control of Camp Korean Village over to, C CO. 2-142 Infantry 56th IBCT 36th Infantry Division which is a Texas Army National Guard unit. Control was then turned over to C-CO. 186th INF Oregon Army national Guard. The Camp was handed over to the Iraqi Army on 1 May 2010.

=== ISIL ===
The Islamic State of Iraq and the Levant (ISIL; also known as ISIS, the Islamic State, or Daesh) began a June offensive in 2014 as part of their Anbar campaign, which involved the capture of the majority of Anbar Province. On 19 June, ISIL forces captured Al-Qa'im, and in the evening of 21 June, ISIL forces also captured Ar-Rutbah. On 22 June 2014, a member of the local council told The New York Times that "around fifty vehicles full of militants and weapons came from Hauran valley and after sporadic clashes with police they took control over the central town. They left a group of them to secure the town and then headed toward the border." On 24 June a Syrian air-force raid on Rutba, to assist the Iraqi army during the 2014 Northern Iraq offensive, killed at least 50 ISIL militants.

In September 2014, it was reported that a couple were convicted of adultery in an ISIL sharia court in Ar-Rutbah, and stoned to death. They were apparently brought out in front of a crowd of 200 residents, and stoned by eight ISIL fighters. An anonymous witness said: "They brought the man and the woman, they tied their hands and covered their faces, and started to stone them."

One airstrike on 31 July 2015 led to the deaths of up to 46 civilians, and between 30 and 70 people being injured. A number of those killed were children, and the majority of victims came from five families in the town. The origin of the airstrike was uncertain, as neither the Iraqi government or coalition forces acknowledged launching a strike near Ar-Rutbah on that date. The United Nations expressed "serious concern" about the issue, and the Governor of Anbar Province, Suhaib al-Rawi, launched an investigation into the attack.

In late August 2015, a coalition airstrike, led by the US Air Force, destroyed a car bomb-making facility on the outskirts of Ar-Rutbah. The facility was described by US Brigadier General Kevin Killea as "strategic for Daesh in funneling VBIEDs into Anbar Province." On 29 August, ISIL militants killed a local resident who killed a member of ISIL as part of a long-running clan blood feud. In response, hundreds of residents demonstrated against the killing, and clashes broke out when ISIL tried to disperse the demonstrations. 70 residents were detained and a further 100 were tied to street lights for 24 hours as punishment.

In March 2016, a number of ISIL fighters based in Ar-Rutbah deserted the town and headed to Mosul, where they were detained by other ISIL fighters. Around 50 deserters were publicly executed in Mosul. It has been estimated that anti ISIL coalition forces have conducted around 50 airstrike missions on and around the town. Iraqi forces returned in May, 2016, driving out ISIL and killing the local commander Abu Waheeb.

ISIL attacked the city on 23 October 2016, possibly in order to draw away Iraqi security forces involved in the Battle of Mosul. A local Iraqi security official stated that the group could have recaptured as much as half of the city. The attack was reported to have been repelled by the following day, with the remaining ISIL militants holed up in two neighbourhoods. Reinforcements were reported to have arrived to fight the attackers while a curfew was imposed in the town. Contradictory reports emerged on the following day that the town had been completely or partially captured by ISIL on the following day. Iraqi Army claimed the ISIL militants only controlled half of the town. The next day the Iraqi Army declared it had fully recaptured the city from the ISIL militants.

== Geography ==
Rutba is 70 miles (110 km) from both the Iraq-Jordan border and the Iraq-Saudi Arabia border.

== Climate ==
Ar-Rutbah has a hot desert climate (Köppen climate classification BWh). Most rain falls in the winter. The average annual temperature in Ar-Rutbah is 18.8 °C (65.8 °F). About 117 mm (4.61 in) of precipitation falls annually.

Climate data for Rutbah (1991–2020, extremes 1928-1976)
| Month | Jan | Feb | Mar | Apr | May | Jun | Jul | Aug | Sep | Oct | Nov | Dec | Year |
|---|---|---|---|---|---|---|---|---|---|---|---|---|---|
| Record high °C (°F) | 25.4 (77.7) | 31.6 (88.9) | 36.2 (97.2) | 39.0 (102.2) | 42.2 (108.0) | 44.4 (111.9) | 46.1 (115.0) | 45.5 (113.9) | 45.0 (113.0) | 40.5 (104.9) | 35.0 (95.0) | 26.5 (79.7) | 46.1 (115.0) |
| Mean daily maximum °C (°F) | 13.9 (57.0) | 16.0 (60.8) | 20.6 (69.1) | 26.7 (80.1) | 32.3 (90.1) | 37.0 (98.6) | 39.4 (102.9) | 39.7 (103.5) | 36.3 (97.3) | 30.1 (86.2) | 21.4 (70.5) | 15.8 (60.4) | 27.4 (81.4) |
| Daily mean °C (°F) | 8.3 (46.9) | 10.1 (50.2) | 14.2 (57.6) | 19.7 (67.5) | 25.0 (77.0) | 29.3 (84.7) | 31.6 (88.9) | 31.9 (89.4) | 28.5 (83.3) | 22.9 (73.2) | 15.0 (59.0) | 10.1 (50.2) | 20.6 (69.0) |
| Mean daily minimum °C (°F) | 2.7 (36.9) | 4.2 (39.6) | 7.8 (46.0) | 12.7 (54.9) | 17.8 (64.0) | 21.6 (70.9) | 23.8 (74.8) | 24.1 (75.4) | 20.7 (69.3) | 15.7 (60.3) | 8.5 (47.3) | 4.5 (40.1) | 13.7 (56.6) |
| Record low °C (°F) | −14.4 (6.1) | −10.0 (14.0) | −6.1 (21.0) | −2.0 (28.4) | 5.5 (41.9) | 7.8 (46.0) | 14.4 (57.9) | 15.0 (59.0) | 8.9 (48.0) | 0.5 (32.9) | −6.0 (21.2) | −8.9 (16.0) | −14.4 (6.1) |
| Average precipitation mm (inches) | 14.4 (0.57) | 21.7 (0.85) | 13.9 (0.55) | 9.0 (0.35) | 8.1 (0.32) | 0.1 (0.00) | 0.1 (0.00) | 0.1 (0.00) | 0.5 (0.02) | 12.7 (0.50) | 18.4 (0.72) | 11.8 (0.46) | 110.8 (4.36) |
| Average precipitation days (≥ 0.1 mm) | 7 | 7 | 9 | 8 | 7 | 0.1 | 0 | 0 | 0.1 | 5 | 7 | 7 | 57.2 |
| Average relative humidity (%) | 67 | 59 | 52 | 43 | 35 | 26 | 25 | 25 | 29 | 36 | 54 | 67 | 43 |
| Average afternoon relative humidity (%) | 44 | 39 | 33 | 26 | 22 | 16 | 15 | 14 | 17 | 23 | 36 | 47 | 28 |
Source: NOAA, DWD(precipitaion days and humidity 1941-1970, extremes) (Note: Afternoon humidity measured at 15 local time)
