= Nairn Transport Company =

Transport company that operated a route from Beirut to Baghdad

A Nairn Transport Company luggage label

The Nairn Transport Company was a pioneering motor transport company that operated a trans-desert route from Beirut, Haifa and Damascus to Baghdad, and back again, from 1923. Their route became known as "The Nairn Way". The firm continued, in various guises, until 1959.

== Origins ==
The company was formed by Norman Nairn (1894–1968) and his brother Gerald (1897–1980) of Blenheim, New Zealand who had served under Allenby in the British Army in the Middle East during World War I. In 1905, their doctor father had been one of the first in New Zealand to own a motor car, a Reo, and the brothers had a successful motorcycle dealership there prior to World War I. Among other brands, they were the sole agents for Harley-Davidson.

After the war, the brothers first traded in ex-army vehicles, then established a motor dealership in 1919 but it was not very successful and they decided to operate a taxi service between Beirut and Haifa with the cars they couldn't sell. There followed a process of experimentation with different vehicles and the brothers often came into conflict with the owners of horse-drawn vehicles to whose business they were a threat. In 1920 they began a mail and passenger service between Beirut and Haifa.

In 1923, the British consul in Damascus, C.E.S. Palmer, asked them to examine the possibility of crossing the Syrian Desert by car. Iraq was under a British League of Nations mandate at the time and a quicker route home would have been a great advantage to the British staff there. Plans for a rail link to the Mediterranean coast had faltered and the air route to Cairo was infrequent and expensive. The Nairns also received encouragement from local traders who were using camels which were slow and liable to attack by tribesmen. One was local sheik and gold smuggler Mohammad Ibn Bassam who had made trial runs of different routes using his own cars.

== Trial runs and first official trip ==
In April 1923, the Nairns made the first of six trial runs from Damascus to Baghdad. The first trip took them three days for a journey of 880 kilometers (550 miles) using a Buick, an Oldsmobile and a Lancia. Having demonstrated the feasibility of the plan, Norman Nairn proposed to British officials in Baghdad that the brothers start a postal service between Damascus and Baghdad. The British agreed, as did the French in Damascus, and the French even provided gold to pay-off desert tribes to ensure safe transit. The brothers signed a five-year contract with the Iraqi government to transport mail from Baghdad to Damascus and Haifa, and back again.

With the help of the Nasser trading family, the Nairn Transport Company was established and the first official trip made on 18 October 1923. The Nairns purchased seven type 63 Cadillacs, finding these cars the most reliable, rugged and well equipped for the arduous desert treks. In addition to carrying two or three passengers plus luggage and mail, the Cadillacs were modified to carry extra gasoline, an icebox, a tank of drinking water plus enough food and provisions for one week. The cars also carried tools and many spare parts should repairs be required along the way. The new arrangements cut the transit time for mail from Baghdad to Europe to around 10 days from the 30 days previously required. Mail had previously travelled by ship from Port Said, via the Suez Canal, around the Arab Peninsula to the port of Basrah and then by rail to Baghdad.

The ground route was also seen as more comfortable than the air route. The Nairn Cadillacs could travel at up to 112 kmh (70 mph) over flat, sun-baked, ground for around two-thirds of the route as the desert was a mud and gravel one rather than sand. Mud and standing water in the rainy season, and rocky ground, were sometimes a problem however. On one occasion Gerald Nairn journeyed from Rutbah to an Iran Petroleum Company post more quickly than an Imperial Airways aircraft that left at the same time. The Nairn cars were also cheaper, costing £30 ($133) per passenger from Beirut to Baghdad, compared to £150 ($663) by air from Cairo to Baghdad.

== Drivers and dangers ==
At first, only two cars made the trip weekly, but by 1925, eight or nine, or even twelve, cars were travelling at the same time. The original Bedouin guides were dropped in favour of extra drivers and the cars changed from daytime travel to driving in the cooler temperatures at night. The cars travelled in convoy, following well established routes that avoided wells or wadis where raiders might be hiding, and regularly checking on each other.

The drivers became acclimatised to the conditions and were experts in the gilhooley maneuver where a car would spin several times, without turning over, on the polished mud flats that were part of the journey, before the driver regained control. Temperatures were very high in the desert and sometimes the tyres caught fire. The drivers were a colourful group of mostly English, Australians, New Zealanders, Canadians, or Americans, known for their drinking and whoring. In order to keep them out of brothels and know where to find them, the Nairns gave each one a house and a girl for company. One-eyed John Reid used a Cadillac to chase down and shoot a cheetah. Ryan, an Australian, was often drunk and filled his water bottles with arak, a local spirit.

Although the convoys were always armed and were often attacked, the Nairns preferred to give the raiders what they wanted rather than risk the death of a passenger and no passenger ever died on a trip, though one was wounded and a driver was shot and later died from his wounds. The drivers were wary of carrying weapons in case they were used against them and in one case a revolver owned by a driver was held to his chest by an Arab and only failed to discharge because the man did not know how to release the safety catch. On another occasion, two Buicks were stolen by raiders and later used to launch attacks against convoys.

== French and British attitudes ==
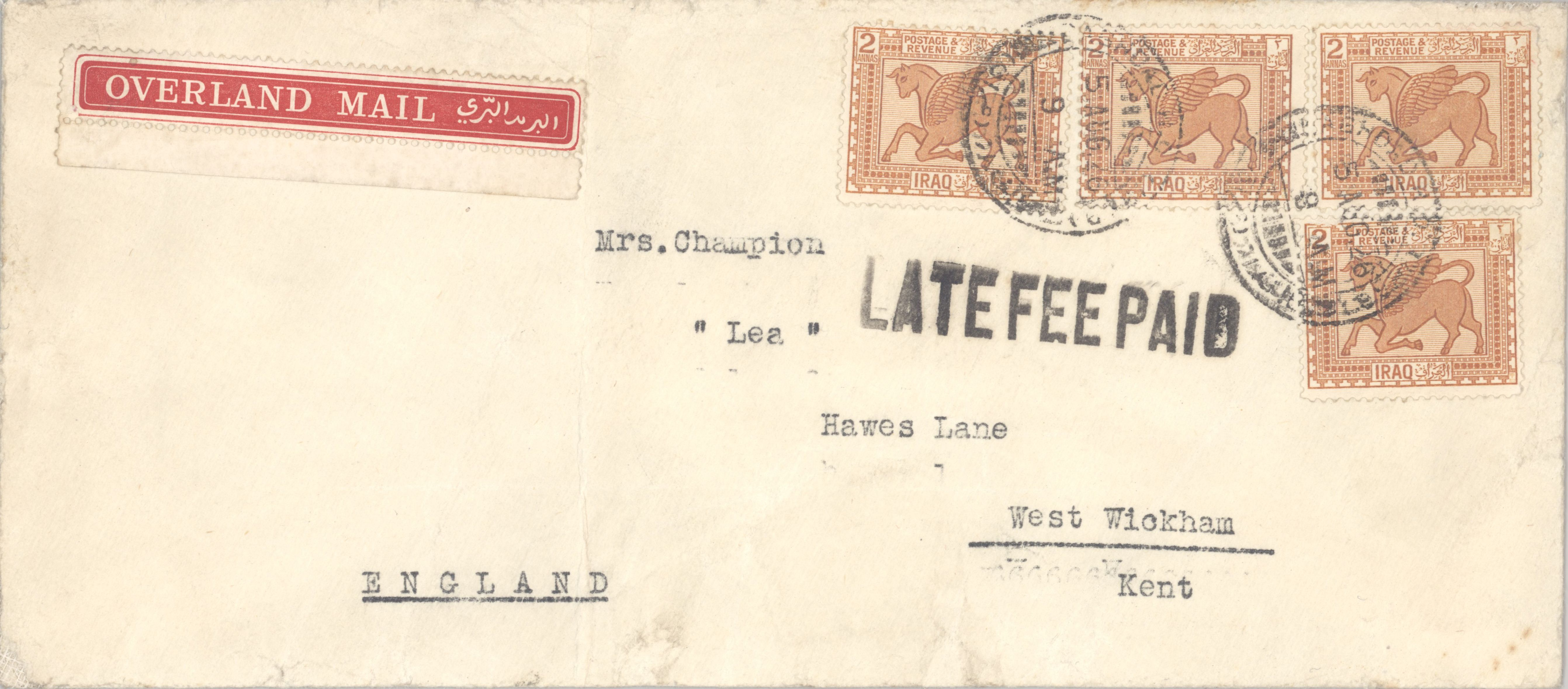
A 5 August 1926 letter from Baghdad to Kent via the Nairn overland route.

The Nairns received strong co-operation from the French who recognised early on the advantages of the service and gave the Nairns the French overland mail contract, allowed them to import equipment without customs duties and gave a small subsidy. They sometimes provided an escort and after one skirmish, allowed the Nairns to chase down the raiders in two Cadillacs. The cars soon outran the camels and after the raiders' ammunition ran out they surrendered their knives to the Nairn men expecting their throats to be cut. In fact, the Nairns handed them over to the French who hanged them.

The British, the other major European power in the region, also recognised the advantages of the service but provided no subsidy. One problem may have been that the Nairns never used British vehicles. They didn't use French ones either but the French didn't care. British cars, even the desert-proven Rolls-Royce, tended to be built for comfort over smooth European roads rather than endurance and lacked the power, high ride and cooling necessary for the long desert runs. They were also too expensive. Lord Nuffield sent a Morris Commercial six-wheel vehicle out but it was a complete failure in desert conditions.

== Nairn Eastern Transport Company Limited ==
In 1926, the brothers took over the Eastern Transport Company and merged it with Nairn. They sold the new company to English and French investors and Norman Nairn became managing director of the new entity which from 20 September 1926 became incorporated with limited liability as the Nairn Eastern Transport Company Limited.

== Routes ==
The main route was Damascus to Baghdad but local troubles and commercial opportunities often involved variations. After the Druze Revolt of 1925, a new route was required around the troubled area, Beirut-Haifa-Jerusalem-Dead Sea-Amman and Rutbah. This involved five-mile-long stretches of lava bed which was very destructive to the cars. A better route of 650 miles was found, Beirut-Homs-Palmyra-Rutbah-Baghdad. Eventually, the original route was reinstated.

By 1927, the brothers had made nearly 4,000 crossings and carried 20,000 passengers and 4,500 sacks of mail.

== Vehicles ==
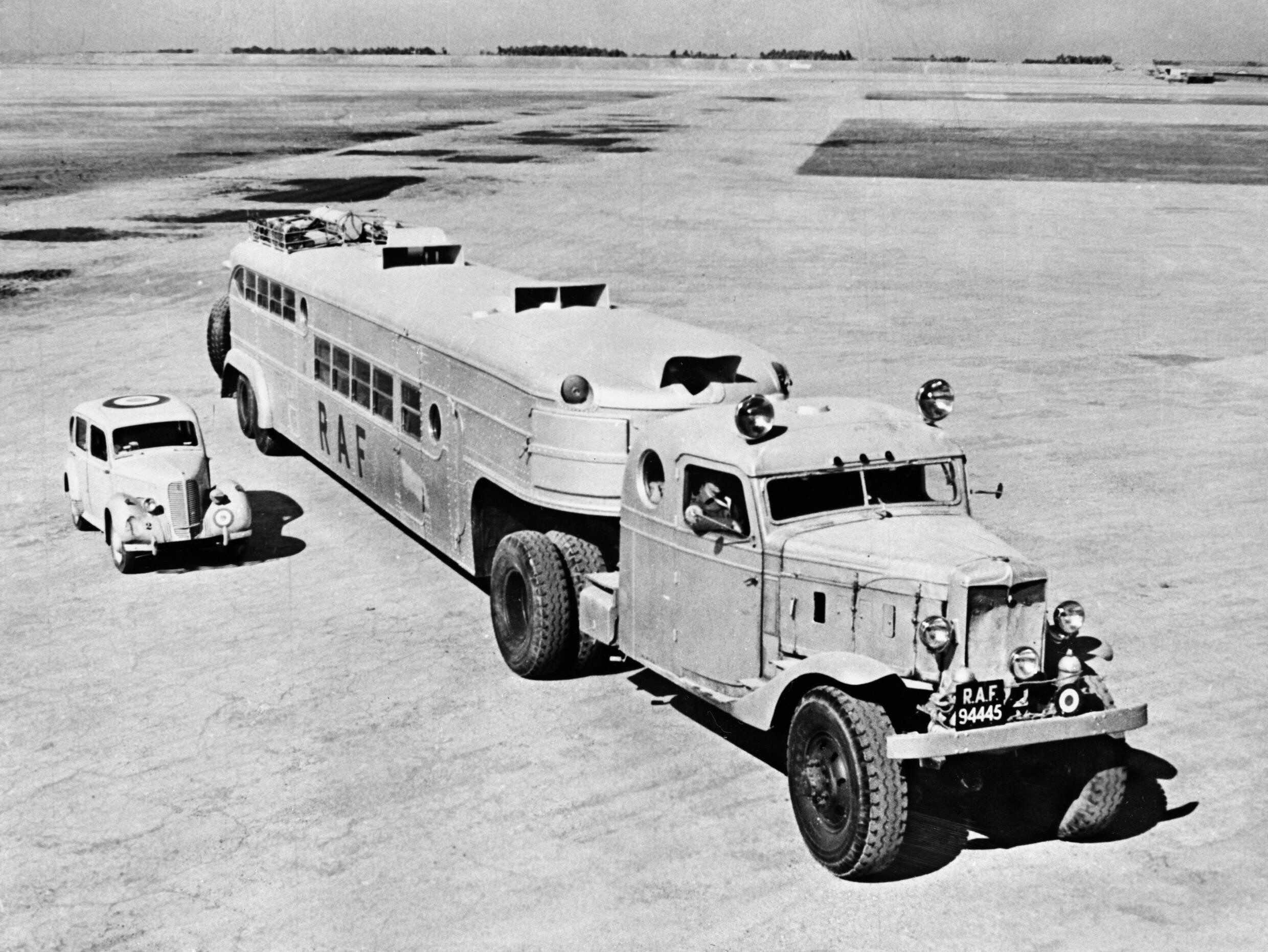
A Nairn Marmon-Herrington bus, converted to military use during World War II

The very long journeys made by the company required a variety of vehicles. The first used were Buick and Cadillac Type V-63 motor cars, and Buick in the United States issued an advertisement in the Saturday Evening Post in 1927 with the legend "Buick carries the Desert Mail". Cadillacs proved very reliable, even in the extreme heat, due to their large radiators and excellent cooling systems. Gerald Nairn said "The Cadillac's ability to take punishment was just amazing" and by the time the firm dispensed with them they had done 200,000 miles each, at least 150-160,000 of which had been on the Damascus to Baghdad run. They were able to run comfortably at 70 mph, a great speed for a motor car in 1923. Cadillac advertising boasted "The Cadillac replaces the Camel".

New, larger vehicles were tried, first Safeway six-wheelers from the United States in 1925, then A.C.F.s (American Car and Foundry).

In 1934, the Nairns introduced two Marmon-Herrington buses specially adapted for them which had 18 tyres and two passenger levels in a dustfree trailer built to Nairn specs in USA by the Bender company,.

The Nairn's archetypal vehicle was however the "Pullman" bus, introduced in 1937, and built using different companies' components to their design on a stainless steel trailer built by the Edward G. Budd Company of Philadelphia The Pullmans were single-level but air-conditioned with refreshment facilities. They were articulated, ran on 10 instead of 18 tyres and cost £12,000 each. The time taken for each run was reduced from 24 to 18 hours. Tractors towing the Pullman trailers were two-axle White trucks.

In 1952, Nairn took delivery of a number of two-axle Studebaker 2R truck tractor units.

During WWII, New Zealand troops occupying Syria were free to use Nairn’s bus service between Damascus and Bagdad. It ran twice a week at the cost of £18 sterling for the return trip. Each bus could carry 18 passengers and by 1958 had travelled 2 million miles.

The Nairns had a well-equipped workshop at their headquarters in Damascus where they employed 85 people near the end.

== Nairn Transport Company Limited ==
In 1936, the Nairn Eastern Transport Company Limited was renamed the Nairn Transport Company Limited after a takeover by founder Norman Nairn, backed by British investors. In 1952, Norman, by now retired and facing a more difficult local political situation, sold the company to his employees. In 1959, the firm was liquidated after border disputes, competition from air transport and political problems made the service unviable.
