= Al Waleed border crossing =

Border crossing between Iraq and Syria

Al-Waleed border crossing منفذ الوليد الحدودي
- Coordinates: 33.4342343°N 38.9077414°E
- Crosses: Iraq–Syria border
- Locale: Al-Waleed, Iraq; Al-Tanf, Syria

Location
- Interactive map of Al-Waleed border crossing

Al-Waleed border crossing (Arabic: منفذ الوليد الحدودي, romanized: Menfath al-Waleed al-Hudoodi), also known as Al-Tanf border crossing (Arabic: منفذ التَّنْف الحدودي, romanized: Menfath al-Tanf al-Hudoodi), is one of three official border crossings between Iraq and Syria. It is located in the Ar-Rutba District of the Al-Anbar Governorate in western Iraq, close to the northeasternmost point of Jordan in the Syrian Desert. It serves as the main border checkpoint on the highway between Damascus and Baghdad. The al-Waleed checkpoint is close to al-Tanf on the Syrian side of the border in the Homs Governorate. The Al-Waleed Palestinian refugee camp is nearby.

== Syrian Civil War ==
In May 2015, the Islamic State (IS) militants captured the checkpoint, thus obtaining control over the full length of the Iraq–Syria border. In early August 2016, the Iraqi checkpoint was recaptured by pro-government Iraqi tribal militias backed by the U.S.-led forces. In August 2016, the BBC published photographs taken in June that year, which it said showed British special forces soldiers apparently guarding the perimeter of the New Syrian Army's base, at al-Waleed in Syria's Homs Governorate.

In March 2017, U.S.-backed Maghawir al-Thawra rebels re-opened the border point, resuming cross-border civilian traffic; a group referred to as Jaish al-Ashair al-Iraqi was said to control the Iraqi side of the crossing. In April 2017, the U.S. "special forces" outpost at al-Waleed was reported to be engaged in combat. On 18 May 2017, U.S.-led coalition fighter jets struck a convoy of pro-Syrian government forces advancing towards the Tanf base, where the U.S. military operated and trained anti-government rebels. Ba'athist Syrian forces appeared to use advanced Russia-made arms and were supported by Russian helicopters, a report acknowledged on May 26 by the Russian Defence ministry's media outlet.

On 17 June 2017, the Iraqi military announced that the Iraqi army and Sunni tribal fighters, supported by U.S.-led coalition aircraft, had dislodged IS from the al-Waleed border crossing.

In a statement to the Iraqi News Agency on 16 February 2026, Iraqi Border Ports Authority chief Omar al-Waeli said the Prime Minister Mohammed Shia al-Sudani has directed authorities to expedite the reopening of the al-Waleed and Rabia border crossings with Syria.

On 2 April 2026, Iraq and Syria reopen the Al Waleed border crossing.
