= Ar-Rutba District =

Ar-Rutba District قضاء الرطبة
- District
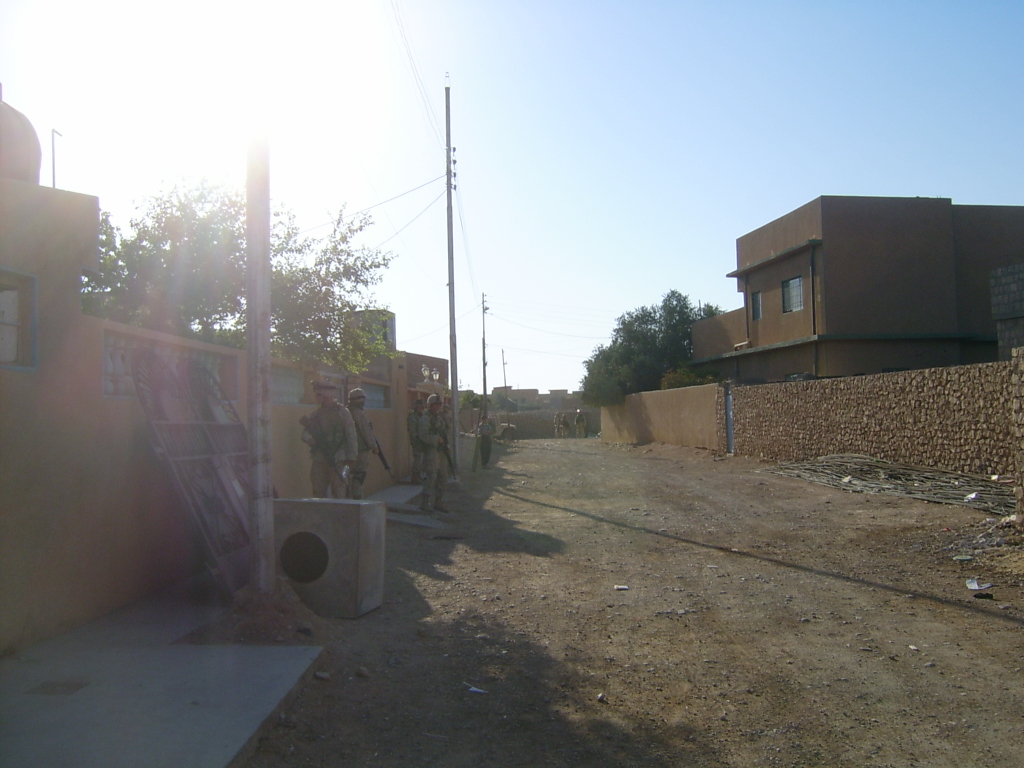
- Street scene in Ar-Rutba town (2004) Ar-Rutba is the largest, southernmost and westernmost of the districts in Al Anbar Governorate

- Coordinates: 33°2′17″N 40°17′4″E
- Country: Iraq
- Governorates: Al Anbar Governorate
- Seat: Ar-Rutba

Area
  - Total: 93,445 km^{2} (36,079 sq mi)

Population 2024
  - Total: 41,285
  - Density: 0.44181/km^{2} (1.1443/sq mi)
- Time zone: UTC+3 (AST)

Ar-Rutba District (Arabic: قضاء الرطبة) is the largest district by area in Al Anbar Governorate also the largest in the entirety of Iraq, covering 93,445 km^{2}, and the least populated in relative and absolute terms in Anbar Governorate, with a population of 47.040 or 0.5112 per km^{2}. It is also the southernmost district of Al Anbar Governorate, the westernmost of the whole country, and the only district nationwide bordering Jordan. It is centred on the town of Ar-Rutba.

== Towns ==
- Al Waleed (Al Walid)
- Ar-Rutbah
- Nukhayb
- Trebil
- Akashat
- Al Habbariyah
- Al Kasrah
