= 2025 massacres of Syrian Alawites =

Extrajudicial retaliation campaigns against Alawites in Syria

2025 Massacre of Syrian Alawites
- Part of the Western Syria clashes and the March 2025 Western Syria clashes during the Syrian civil war
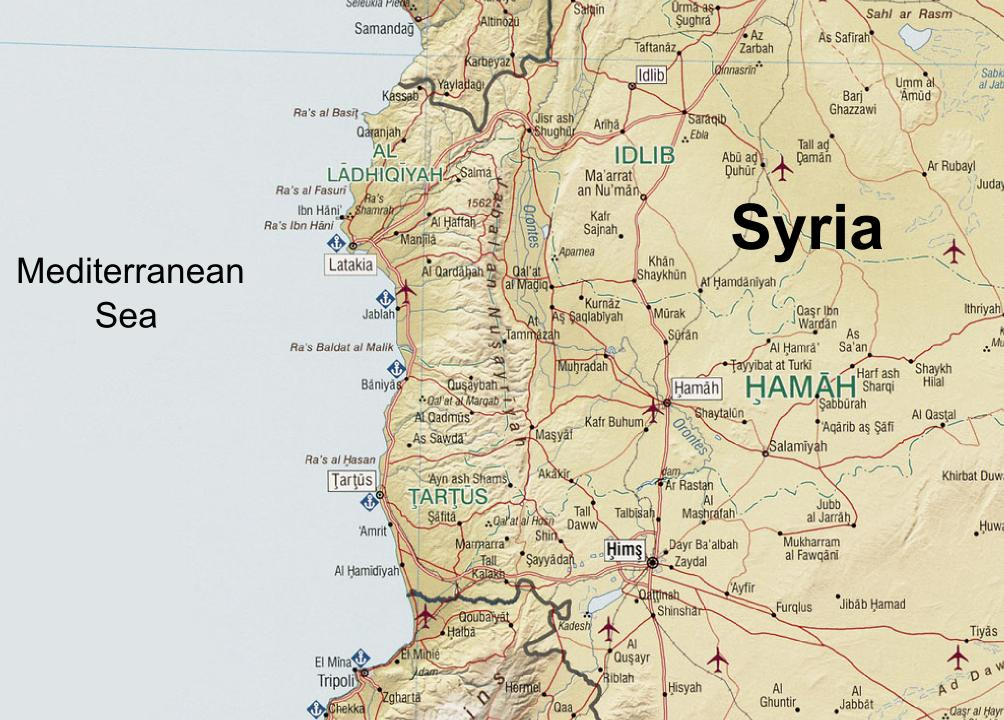
- Map of the Syrian Coastal Mountain Range, which is home to most Alawites
- Location: Latakia, Tartus, Hama and Homs Governorates, Syria
- Date: 6–27 March 2025 (main phase) (3 weeks); March 2025–present (1 year and 7 months)
- Target: Alawite civilians Assadist insurgents
- Attack type: Collective punishment, extrajudicial killings, sectarian violence, massacre, kidnappings
- Deaths: Until 23 February: 151 in sectarian killings, 154 in other retaliatory killings (per SOHR); From 6 March: 1,479 Alawites during 7-9 March, characterized largely by direct targeting of civilians (per Reuters investigation); 639+ civilians and disarmed fighters killed by government-aligned fighters (compared to 213 security forces and 231 civilians killed by Assadist militias) per SNHR); 1,659+ civilians (ethnicity unspecified) and 259 Alawite militants (compared to 273 security forces), per SOHR; 2,246 civilians (per report from the Scandinavian Institute for Human Rights/Haytham Manna Foundation); 1,700 civilians (per advisor to the former head of the Alawite Council); 1,700 unspecified (per Hawar News Agency)
- Victims: Thousands of Alawites and Christians displaced
- Perpetrators: Syrian Armed Forces; Turkistan Islamic Party in Syria; (Syria) General Security Service; (Syria) Syrian National Army; (Syria) Hamza Division; Sultan Suleiman Shah Division; Saraya Ansar al-Sunnah; Local Sunni Muslim civilians
- Motive: (Syria) Syrian Armed Forces and associated parties: Crackdown on Assad loyalists; Anti-Alawite sentiment

A series of mass killings and massacres against Alawite people occurred in Syria from 6 March 2025 to 17 March 2025, with a resurgence in early April. Estimates of the death toll range from about 1,000 to 2,000, with some sources saying the majority of the victims were civilians. The attacks were carried out by armed groups aligned with the Syrian caretaker government, at least some of whom were engaged in a counter-insurgency operation against armed remnants of the former Assad regime in the aftermath of the Syrian Civil War.

The targeting of Alawites was justified by the conflation of "regime remnants" with Alawite people in general, as the Assad family are themselves Alawites, had favored Alawites for government positions during their rule, and had positioned themselves as protectors of the Alawite community despite significant opposition from within it. The violence included many alleged cases of gunmen showing up at civilians' homes, asking them whether they were Alawite or Sunni, and then killing them if they answered "Alawite". Various parties have characterized this targeting of Alawites as a genocide or the potential leadup to one.

Especially deadly massacres began in early March 2025 in Latakia Governorate, where, according to the SOHR, Syrian security forces killed hundreds of civilians over the span of two days, including 52 Alawite individuals in the towns of Al-Mukhtariya and Al-Shir in rural Latakia alone. These events took place during a period of heightened tensions and armed clashes between Syrian transitional government forces and militants that are loyal to former Syrian President Bashar al-Assad, as described by Syrian authorities. Despite assurances by new government officials that minorities would be safe in the new Syria, Alawite communities have been subject to a number of massacres since December 2024.

Numerous perpetrators were suspected, including the Transitional Government's General Security Service and other former-HTS units and Turkish-backed militias such as the Sultan Suleiman Shah Division. In March 2025, Syrian president Ahmed al-Sharaa denied responsibility for the attacks. In his speech, al-Sharaa said that "remnants of the former regime" had no choice but to surrender immediately as he vowed to hold accountable "anyone involved in civilian bloodshed". He later promised to punish the perpetrators, saying that Assad loyalists and associated foreign powers committed the killings with the aim of destabilizing the Syrian state and restarting the civil war. In July 2025, an investigative committee submitted two lists of suspects to courts and announced its findings in a press conference. The committee's press conference did not attribute any responsibility for the massacres to Transitional Government forces.

On 10 March 2025, the Syrian government announced the end of counter-insurgency operations after expelling pro-Assad insurgents from "vital centres" and re-establishing control over most of the roadways in the coastal region. Despite al-Sharaa's statements, sectarian killings and kidnappings continued in Syria as of late 2025, with many cases remaining without charges for the perpetrators.

== Background ==
Coastal Syria, and especially the Latakia Governorate, has historically served as the heartland of Syria's Alawite community, a minority religious group which is considered an offshoot or a sect of Shia Islam, which comprises around 11% of the entire Syrian population. The Assad family, which ruled Syria for decades, belonged to this religious minority, giving a small number of its members positions within the regime (especially those members who were closely tied to the Assad family and those members who served in the loyalist Shabiha militias and were involved in organised crime such as the Captagon trade), while it was suppressing dissent in the community and it was also portraying itself as the defender of minorities against the Sunni Muslim majority. However, the Assad government under Bashar had increasingly become unpopular among Alawites due to its corruption and the economic collapse.

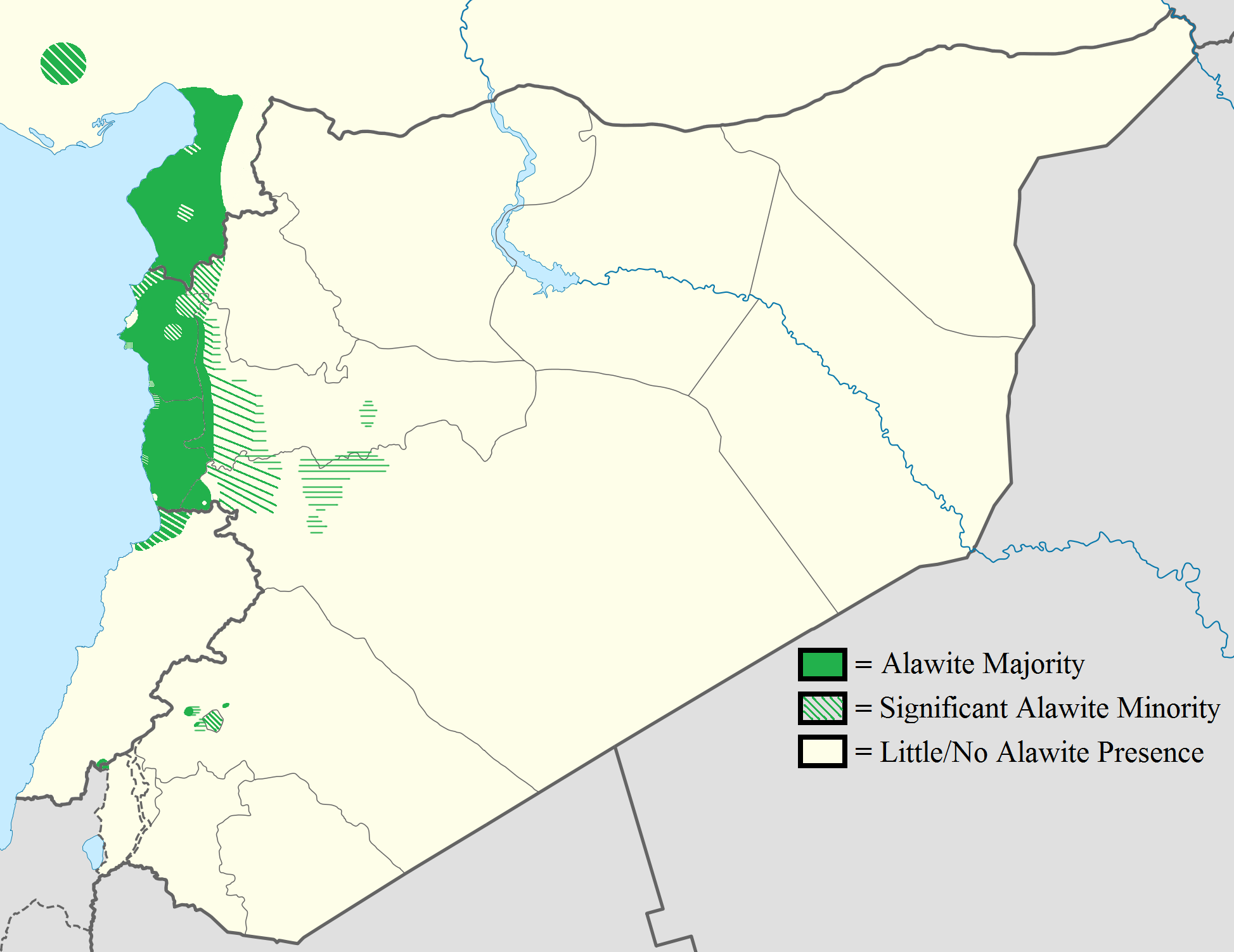
Map showing the distribution of Alawites in Syria and neighboring nations

Following the fall of Assad in December 2024, Alawi stronghold Qardaha (the Assad family hometown) was "the first place the opposition factions headed for, just 24 hours after entering Damascus. An opposition delegation met with prominent Alawite figures there and returned with a statement of support from them," according to Al-Araby Al-Jadeed.

After the establishment of a transitional government under then-Hay'at Tahrir al-Sham (HTS) emir Ahmed al-Sharaa, a "mosaic" of new security forces was installed across the region by the new government, including: the more disciplined and professional General Security units of the former Syrian Salvation Government's HTS-controlled Ministry of Interior in the most heavily minority-dominated areas such as Latakia and Jableh in Latakia governorate; Military Operations Command units (including some Islamist foreign fighters) which were pulled out of the cities to rural areas in late December due to their lack of restraint, one unit of Fursan Sharqiyah fighters affiliated to the Turkish-backed SNA, deployed in Tartous; and local factions returning to hometowns from which they had been displaced during the civil war, e.g. in Salamiyah, Talkalakh, Qusayr, and Homs city. Servicemen from Assad's armed forces, including volunteers and conscripts, returned to their hometowns, making settlements with the new security services to gain civilian status.

In mid-December, HTS sources stated that armed criminals who were connected to the old regime were involved in looting and lawlessness in the coastal region. HTS units were ambushed by Assad loyalist militias. The HTS-led security forces launched a campaign to disarm these groups and to get temporary IDs affording them protection as civilians.

There were demonstrations in support of the old regime on 25 December, and sectarian slogans were posted by both sides, in Latakia in the early days after the fall of Assad, as well as reports of disinformation fuelling sectarian tensions. The same day, there were ex-regime militias ambushed security forces in the Tartous countryside, to which HTS special forces responded with a three-day operation, focusing on Khirbet Maazah (home to many former regime loyalists), which involved considerable use of force including shoot-outs and alleged looting, the first of a series of clashes between government forces and pro-Assad loyalist holdouts, particularly in regions with significant Alawite populations.

On 17 February, al-Sharaa made a symbolic visit to Latakia as part of a national tour, meeting with local dignitaries from various sects.

The Jerusalem Post reported that the new administration had been restructuring state apparatus through widespread dismissals of officials, many of whom came from the Alawite community. According to Alawite activists, members of their community had experienced targeted violence and persecution since Assad's fall, particularly in rural areas of Homs and Latakia Governorates. The Post said that, despite al-Sharaa's public commitment to inclusive governance, no formal meetings with senior Alawite representatives were reported, in contrast with the administration's documented meetings with leaders from other minority groups including Kurds, Christians, and Druze. In addition, several reports of mass-distributed flyers filled with hate speech against Alawites alongside the filmed destruction and vandalization of Alawi religious shrines had been reported since December 2024.

== Violence and massacres ==
January 2025: Turkish Alawite politician Tülay Hatimoğulları gives a speech about anti-Alawite violence at the Shrine of Khidr

=== January ===
From January, the Middle East Institute, the US-based NGO Syrian Justice and Accountability Centre, and the Syrian Observatory for Human Rights (SOHR), a UK-based monitor formerly associated with the anti-Assad opposition but highly critical of the new government, reported several sectarian incidents, including some alleged massacres, in the western countryside of Homs province, committed during security sweeps aiming to disarm former regime loyal militias.

On 14 January 2025, the SOHR reported that Alawite civilians of Tasnin located in the Homs countryside were targeted by gunmen who said they are part of the Military Operations Command. According to SOHR, the gunmen launched a widespread arrest operation towards the village from early morning to the afternoon of 16 January. Several suspects resisted the arrest attempts. During the operation, the attackers set seven houses on fire and murdered six civilians. Multiple villagers and elders in Tasnin and nearby settlements attempted to report the massacre to Syrian government police and security forces, but did not receive any response mentioning the violence.

On 23 January 2025, the Military Operations Command launched a large-scale security campaign in collaboration with local gunmen in the villages of al-Hamam, al-Ghozaylah, al-Gharbiyah and Fahel in the countryside west of Homs. During the operation, four civilians were extrajudicially killed, ten civilians were injured, and five others were arrested. The SOHR claimed that government-aligned gunmen abused and assaulted other villagers, forcing several to bark and bray like animals, and destroyed several village tombstones.

=== March ===
==== 4 March ====
On Tuesday 4 March, according to state media, security forces launched a campaign against Assad loyalist militias in the Daatour neighbourhood of Latakia city after an ambush by "members of the remnants of Assad militias" killed two security personnel. Ali Akbar Velayati, an international affairs advisor to Iran's supreme leader, said a civil war could break out in Syria at any moment, and that Iran had evidence "indicating the beginnings of the state's disintegration."

==== 5 March ====
There were several fires in forested areas of Latakia, with the transitional government blaming seventeen on sabotage acts by "remnants" of the Assad regime.

==== 6 March ====
Violence significantly escalated on Thursday 6 March, when intense armed confrontations broke out in Latakia Governorate between Syrian security personnel and armed groups loyal to the former president. The fighting spread across several towns in the region predominantly inhabited by Alawites. Rob Geist Pinfold, a lecturer in international security at King's College London, told Al Jazeera English that this was part of an on-going co-ordinated insurgency by Assadist militias such as Syrian Popular Resistance (formed in December), designed to provoke sectarian conflict and "set Syria on a path to civil war". Local civil rights activists described the perpetrators as former regime loyalists and former elements of the army, security services and forces allied with the Assad regime, and that the violence was well planned and co-ordinated.

The violence initially concentrated around the Jableh area but rapidly expanded to other locations. Armed remnants of the former Assad regime (reportedly including fighters loyal to former army General Suheil al-Hassan) launched a series of coordinated attacks against security forces in the cities of Jableh, Baniyas and the surrounding areas. Insurgents overran several positions. According to SNHR, upwards of 75% of the city of Baniyas was captured by remnants of the former Assad regime in this assault. SOHR said that 48 people were killed in clashes in Jableh. At least 10 members of the security forces were captured by pro-Assad gunmen in Qardaha, according to Al-Araby Al-Jadeed. Reuters verified video of fighting between pro-Assad forces and security forces in Homs.

The insurgency provoked widespread rage: there were street protests against the insurgency in traditionally anti-Assad neighbourhoods across Syria, calling for a response. To quell the rebellion, Syrian interim government authorities sent in reinforcements to western Syria. including tanks and armoured vehicles. The Syrian Minister of Defense mobilized government military forces to "break the back of the remnants of the regime and make them an example to anyone who dares to tamper with the country's security." Latakia's Director of Public Security mobilized a full security response to the province. The official Military Operations Management Telegram channel initially urged for popular participation in heading to coastal Syria to "support our brothers", before stating that additional support was no longer needed.

At the same time, the Alawite Islamic Council in Syria and the Diaspora called on Alawites to "take to the streets and demonstrate [against the new government] in coastal cities and towns" and the Alawite Council in Latakia called on Russia to "immediately and urgently intervene to protect the Syrian people, especially the Alawite sect, from the threat of genocide by terrorist organizations."

Thousands of fighters from Islamist groups, including pro-Turkish factions from the Free Syrian Army, arrived from Idlib, Aleppo, and Deir ez-Zor to coastal Syria with many local residents joining. Several mosques broadcast calls to jihad, according to Le Monde reporters. Multiple videos recorded by armed men showed large convoys of militants moving towards Tartus and Latakia. A narrator in one video (which CNN was unable to geolocate) stated: "It was the battle for liberation. Now it's a battle for purification [of Syria]," while a man in military gear stated, "To the Alawites, we're coming to slaughter you and your fathers" and "we will show you the [strength] of the Sunnis."

According to SOHR, at least 35 pro-government fighters and 32 pro-Assad gunmen died in the violence, while four civilians were also killed.

The government imposed a 24-hour curfew in the coastal cities in the evening and began a search for militants following the violence.

==== 7 March ====
Beginning at approximately 8:00 a.m. AST on 7 March 2025, armed groups entered Alawite neighborhoods in Baniyas, a multi-faith coastal town in Tartus Governorate. According to eyewitness accounts provided to Le Monde, these groups included Syrian Ministry of Defense and General Security Service members from nearby regions in conjunction with fighters described as "foreigners", including individuals of purported Turkmen and Chechen origin. Multiple witnesses described systematic targeting of Alawite residents, with men being executed on rooftops and in streets. SOHR reported sixty people killed in Baniyas, including ten women and five children, marking one of the largest single massacres documented on 7 March.

General Security entered the village of Beit Ana in search of wanted individuals but were attacked, after which ambulances transporting the dead and wounded security forces were also attacked. State media reported that militias loyal to Assad had opened fire on "members and equipment of the defence ministry" near Beit Ana, killing one security force member and wounding two. SOHR reported that in response there were "strikes launched by Syrian helicopters on armed men in the village of Beit Ana and the surrounding forests, coinciding with artillery strikes on a neighbouring village".

Deutsche Welle reported that executions were carried out by fighters on both sides. Altogether, the Syrian Network for Human Rights (SNHR)—a human rights NGO regularly cited as independent and credible by certain major outlets like The Guardian and The New York Times, but also criticized in a recent investigation by Fair Observer for its methodology, and alleged connections with the Syrian Transitional Government—claimed in its initial report that 125 civilians were killed in addition to 100 Syrian security forces over 6–7 March in the attacks; yet it attributed 15 civilian deaths as being the result of pro-Assad insurgents.

By the early hours of 8 March, SOHR said that thirty-eight civilians in Al-Mukhtariya had been killed, as well as twenty-four civilians in Al-Shir, twenty-two in Qurfays, seven in the Al-Haffah district, seven in Beit Ana and Dweir Baabda in the Jableh countryside, and two in Yahmur in the Tartus countryside, with SOHR attributing these to members of the Syrian Ministry of Defense and General Security Service forces firing squads. SOHR also reported that an Alawite sheikh, Shaaban Mansour, and his son were killed by a firing squad in a field execution in Salhab, Hama Governorate, by government security forces. Combined with the earlier report of sixty civilians killed in Baniyas, the SOHR claimed that at least 162 civilians were killed across five separate massacres on 7 March alone. Reports of widespread looting of businesses and residences by unidentified individuals taking advantage of the ongoing lack of security were noted by the Office of the United Nations High Commissioner for Human Rights.

Al Jazeera English reported that its photographer Riad al-Hussein was wounded in the clashes but that his condition was stable.

SNHR, for its part, attributed the abuses by government-aligned fighters to "factions from the North" (i.e. SNA units), and civilians who took up arms in revenge attacks, and called for a full investigation as well as compensation to victims' families.

Syrian authorities implemented curfews in the cities Tartus and Latakia along the Syrian coast, and in the city of Homs. Authorities blamed widespread power outages on "sabotage". President al-Sharaa commented on the violence in coastal provinces, stating that the era of forgiveness and amnesty had ended and the era of "purification" and "liberation" had begun, while urging security forces to protect civilians. Syria's interior ministry said some "individual violations" were by civilians and militias carrying out reprisals for attacks by Assadist groups. The ministry said "We are working to put a stop to these violations that do not represent the Syrian people as a whole." The official Telegram channel for the Military Operations Command announced that roughly a half million million fighters were sent to the region to break the "Nusayri rebellion", with Nusayri being used as a derogatory term against Alawites.

===== Latakia Governorate =====
The New Arab said that reports suggested clashes were ongoing in multiple locations in the coastal region on the morning of the 7th, with government forces battling to retake areas around Latakia and the city of Qardaha.

Monitoring groups, including the SOHR, reported that security forces had conducted executions of fifty-two Alawite men in the Latakia countryside. The organization based its findings on video evidence it said it had authenticated alongside testimonies collected from relatives of the victims. It said these killings occurred in the specific locations of Al-Shir, Al-Mukhtariya, and Al-Haffah. According to SOHR director Rami Abdul Rahman, gunmen killed 69 men in these villages while sparing women and children, but SOHR also told AFP that thirteen women and five children were killed. SNHR also said about 40 civilians were executed together in al-Mukhtariya, though a later Reuters study found that 157 people were killed in the village, or a quarter of the population. The Guardian said it was unable to independently verify the video, but CNN was able to geolocate one in Al Mukhtareyah. Residents of Sanobar in Latakia Governorate reported that militants shot the town's mayor and three sons in front of their mother, before threatening to kill one of the son's daughters unless his wife gave them their gold. Reuters reported that location-verified imagery from the town showed approximately 20 men, many visibly bloodied, lying alongside one another along a roadside in the town center. Multiple sources released footage showing deceased individuals in civilian attire collected in a residential courtyard, with blood visible in the vicinity and women audibly mourning. Additional video evidence reportedly showed armed individuals in military uniforms directing three people to move on the ground before shooting them at close range. The SOHR distributed these recordings, as did local activists; AFP said it was unable to verify them. Two videos showing a car dragging a body in Latakia were verified by the BBC. Residents of Qardaha reported heavy machine gun fire in residential areas, preventing them from leaving their homes due to intense fighting. People gathered outside a Russian air base near Jableh seeking protection.

There were reports from within the Alawite community that Alawites who had opposed the Assad regime in the past were also murdered by Syrian Sunni militia members, as well as Chechen and Turkmen fighters, in sectarian attacks, including a 72-year-old who had allegedly been imprisoned previously for opposing the Assad regime in the 1980s.

====== Al-Fuqara massacres ======
SOHR reported what they said was testimony of a survivor of massacres committed in two villages of al-Fuqara in the countryside of Qardaha reported on the "sectarian cleansing" of the villages, alleging the killing of over 150 unarmed men and youth between the ages of 13 and 85. He claimed that the villages, predominantly inhabited by Alawite residents, had welcomed the new Syrian government following the fall of Assad's regime. He said that violence began on 6 March at approximately 6:00 p.m., when security personnel positioned at a checkpoint on the main road began firing randomly toward the villages, described as an attempt to provoke residents into returning fire to provide justification for a military-style intervention. He said villagers remained in their homes in fear and did not retaliate with any gunfire.

He said that in the early morning hours of 7 March, substantial military convoys arrived from various Syrian provinces. By 5:00 a.m., he said he estimated 4,000 armed individuals equipped with automatic weapons, including Kalashnikov rifles, had assembled near the village entrance. These forces were supported by vans mounted with machine guns. At approximately 6:00 a.m., he said, the armed groups initiated heavy gunfire directed at residential structures while inhabitants remained inside. Following this initial assault, he said that the perpetrators, comprising two distinct factions targeting each village, began systematic house-to-house operations. He said that males aged thirteen and above were specifically targeted and separated from women and younger children, and that these individuals were then methodically subjected either to immediate field executions conducted outside their residences, or being forced to crawl to the village square before being shot. He alleged that the perpetrators employed additional methods of killing, which included premeditated torture techniques such as breaking civilians' backs and trampling them, as well as mutilation tactics such as gouging out eyes and dismembering limbs with saws. In one instance, he said, an infirm man was forcibly removed from his sickbed before being executed outside his home. He heard armes individuals shouting anti-Alawite slogans such as "Alawites and pigs, we will exterminate you" during the operations. He said sectarian songs were sung while victims were being led to execution sites. Following the executions, he said, secondary groups entered the villages with the apparent objective of property destruction and theft. He alleged that individuals systematically looted valuable possessions from residences, destroyed items that could not be removed, and burned numerous structures. According to the SOHR, the massacre appears to have been part of a premeditated plan aimed at both extermination and displacement of the remaining Alawite population in the area.

In the village of Sonobar, following killings in the area anti-Alawite messages were scrawled on houses in the village saying things such as 'You were a minority, and now you are a rarity.'

===== Hama Governorate =====
In rural areas of Hama Governorate, similar violence occurred. In the Alawite village of Arzah, approximately one hundred armed individuals from the neighboring Sunni village of Khitab reportedly entered the community around 2:00 p.m. AST after Friday prayers. According to survivors, village security forces attempted to prevent the incursion by firing warning shots before being overwhelmed. The village pharmacist was allegedly the first to be executed, followed by systematic house-to-house killings involving AK-47s that resulted in 24 deaths, including two women. Khitab imam and Salafi figure Abu Jaber indirectly claimed responsibility for the massacre on Arzah on 7 March. He expressed that it was necessary to "cleanse" the area of Alawite settlements, and stated that it would be the nearby Alawite village of Rabia's "turn" next. Several atrocities were reported in Tishrin in Hama province, including a video of a man being thrown out of his car before being "violently trampled". Tishrin residents claimed that soldiers of the Hamza Division as well as the Sultan Suleiman Shah Division, headed by general Mohammed al-Jassem, both affiliated with the pro-Turkish Syrian National Army, were involved in the atrocities.

==== 8 March ====
On 8 March 2025, security forces had retaken control of the cities of Latakia, Baniyas, Tartous and Jableh, but fighting with Assad loyalist groups continued in the outskirts and rural areas. Pro-government reinforcements arrived in Qardaha, where Assadist loyalists were still fighting. Forces loyal to Damascus arrested one group of fighters that had committed violations against Alawite civilians, and seized vehicles stolen by armed groups from local residents.

In the village of Al-Rusafa, Alawites were humiliated by being forced to howl like dogs and at least 60 were killed including at least one victim as young as 4 years old. Those killed also suffered from mutilation, with one man having his heart cut out and placed on his chest. Following the massacre, messages appeared in al-Rusafa saying 'Sunni men passed through here. We came to shed your blood.'

Meanwhile, in the village of Qurfays representatives of the village were sent to try to mediate with the Othman Brigade. These representatives stated that they did not harbour any support for the 6 March uprising. Although during the mediation efforts six men were killed outside the Qurfays shrine and another fifty were beaten. Later on, a convoy of 80 vehicles arrived and killed 23 people over two days. Those in Unit 400, a force within the Syrian army, had stated that crying was banned as looting occurred throughout the village, and that the villagers should be thankful for 'being allowed to bury their dead.'

In Baniyas, armed groups reportedly returned to areas they had previously targeted, resuming executions and expanding their victims to include entire families, including women and children. One resident claimed that attackers who had accepted payments or valuables such as gold and silver to spare lives on 7 March returned the next day to kill those same individuals.

31 civilians in Tuwaym, including nine children and four women, were killed and buried in a mass grave. Residents of Alawite villages and towns claimed that gunmen shot civilians in streets or at the entrances to their homes. In some instances, assailants reportedly checked identification documents to verify individuals' religious affiliation before killing them. Other witnesses reported attackers gathering near residential buildings, firing indiscriminately at homes, burning down homes, stealing cars and property, leaving bodies in the streets, on rooftops, and inside homes, and preventing residents from retrieving the deceased for proper burial. Some residents claimed that the attackers included foreign fighters and militants from neighboring communities, though these allegations could not be independently verified.

During the afternoon, gunmen fired upon a funeral procession in Muzayraa, killing two brothers, forcing civilians to run away into surrounding orchards. Several armed groups coming from neighboring Sunni settlements alleged by survivors to be associated with Hay'at Tahrir al-Sham (HTS) reportedly "started killing everyone in the houses" of Sharifa, while setting fire to and looting residences. Surviving residents reported that they confirmed twenty-seven deaths, which included five women, after assembling photos and videos of residents killed. A list of names of over 130 civilian victims in Muzayraa, over fifty from Snobar, forty-two from Ain al-Arous, and eleven in Bustan al-Basha was distributed by surviving locals.

Electricity and drinking water supplies were cut off in large areas around Latakia. Thousands of residents reportedly fled to nearby mountains for safety. Others sought refuge across the border in Lebanon, according to Lebanese lawmaker Haidar Nasser. Lebanese lawmaker Sajih Attieh reported that "very large waves" of displaced Syrians evacuated to five or six Alawite villages in Akkar District, estimating a total of 10,000 arrivals in one day. He claimed that due to earlier Israeli bombardments of three border crossings, there was no public security present to legally control the flow of displaced Syrians.

Dozens of civilians, former members of the Assad regime and their families fled to the Khmeimim Air Base – still under Russian control – in Latakia province to seek refuge. Footage and satellite imagery verified by The New York Times showed hundreds of newly parked vehicles on roads inside the base perimeter. Video evidence documented large crowds of people outside the facility holding placards and chanting "We want international protection." More than a dozen military tents had been erected, with footage showing women and children receiving food distributed by personnel in military fatigues inside the base.

By midday on 8 March, the number of killings reported by SOHR reached 532, and reached 745 by the end of the day. SNHR, in contrast, said late on 8 March that since 6 March a total of 164 civilians, including seven children and 13 women, were confirmed killed in the villages and towns of Jableh, Baniyas, and Latakia, as well as 121 General Security checkpoint personnel and that 147 people (26 civilians and 121 security forces) had been killed by militants loyal to Assad, but noted that the actual death toll would be much higher.

==== 9 March ====
According to the SOHR, 303 civilians were reported to have been killed on 9 March by the security forces, Ministry of Defense personnel and allied forces, with 103 in Tartus Governorate, 194 in Lataika Governorate, and six in Hama Governorate.

On the morning of 9 March, several reported atrocities took place in Taanita and Al-Qadmus near the city of Tartus. Roughly a dozen Alawite villages in Hama Governorate had been evacuated and deserted. A doctor in a hospital in Al-Qadmus reported receiving several cases with gunshot wounds and shrapnel-related injuries, and that whole families had been "wiped out" by the Syrian government's massacre. State authorities positioned a military convoy in the vicinity of Al-Qadmus.

The Syrian Ministry of Interior stated that additional security reinforcements were sent to the Tartus countryside, reporting that the General Security Department was conducting combing operations around Al-Qadmus and settlements surrounding Tartus Governorate against pro-Assad holdouts. The state-owned Syrian Arab News Agency posted pictures showing forces leaving Idlib Governorate to fight against Assad-linked remnants. The Syrian Ministry of Defense stated that it closed all roads between coastal Syria and other regions to prevent further transgressions.

At Hammam Wasel in the Baniyas countryside, SOHR reported significant military movements by government forces entering the area. Tanks were deployed on the town's outskirts, accompanied by artillery shelling and gunfire, creating several fires in many areas. These operations reportedly triggered fires in several areas of the town and caused panic among local residents. During a state-implemented curfew, Beit Al-Ateiq village experienced artillery bombardment by the Military Operations Command, resulting in the burning of residential structures. Several additional areas in the Tartus countryside suffered from "heavy bombardment" using tanks and drones. The attacks particularly concentrated along the Al-Qadmus-Baniyas highway and in several specific locations including Ta'nita. During rescue calls made during the bombardments, residents of Hammam Wasel and Beit Al-Ateiq reportedly exclaimed that their villages were not concertedly pro-Assad.

Multiple locations in Latakia province were subjected to Military Operations Command bombardment, with SOHR documenting military operations in Barmiya, Al-Hattaniyah, Al-Ruwaymiyah, Al-Rumaylah, Muzayraa, Al-Quayqah, and Mazar Al-Qatariyah. Several drone strikes were reported in mountainous and forested areas, suggesting that authorities suspected these regions of serving as hideouts or transit routes for militant groups. SOHR said that several residents made distress calls through human rights monitoring organization, pleading for security forces to protect them. SOHR described government bombings as "indiscriminate"

The number of civilian deaths in Sanobar was reported to have increased to at least 133.

==== 10 March ====
SOHR reported at least 143 civilian deaths on 10 March, with seventy-one in Hama Governorate, forty-two in Tartus Governorate, twenty-six in Lataika Governorate, and four in Homs Governorate. On 11 March, SNHR published a report on the violence and gave a cumulative total number of documented deaths in Latakia, Hama, Tartous and Homs for the period from 6 to 10 March: at least at least 803 people, including 420 civilians and "disarmed militants" killed by armed forces aligned with Damascus, plus 172 pro-Damascus fighters and 211 civilians killed by pro-Assad forces.

According to SOHR, Syrian Ministry of Defense-affiliated armed groups stormed Harison in the countryside of Baniyas, which had been evacuated after its residents fled into nearby farmlands following earlier attacks. SOHR said the gunmen looted several homes and set many on fire. Residents of Harison demanded immediate intervention and for UN representatives to survey the town. Almost 200 civilians in Baniyas had been killed since 7 March. Survivors reported that the perpetrators included "Syria-based jihadi foreign fighters" from surrounding provinces, along with local Sunni Muslim civilians from neighboring villages enacting reprisals for earlier massacres committed by Assad-loyalist paramilitaries against Sunni residents, including the 2013 Bayda and Baniyas massacres.

SOHR said that the delivery of food supplies and essential needs to coastal Syria and in Lataika and Jableh neighbourhoods had been ceased since the start of the reprisals, This, in conjunction with interrupted water supplies, electricity, and suspended operations of local bakeries, led to a significant deterioration in living conditions, and forced residents to send distress calls.

Dozens of displaced citizens who were taking refuge in the Russian-controlled Khmeimim Air Base in Latakia Governorate held a demonstration against the massacres committed by the Syrian Ministry of Defense and Ministry of the Interior and associated militias. SOHR said efforts by Syrian security forces to convince citizens to leave with promises of renewed security were generally unsuccessful, with many carrying placards protesting against ethnic cleansing and demanding protection from the international community to prevent further massacres.

According to a report by The Guardian citing SNHR, Syrian National Army units Hamza Division and Sultan Suleiman Shah Division were responsible for the majority of killings of civilians.

==== 11 March ====
During 11 March, the SOHR said it had documented the killings of 132 Alawite civilians in three separate massacres, bringing their cumulative total to 1,225 civilian deaths in forty-seven separate massacres since 6 March. The bodies of eight civilians were found dumped in a well in Al-Sabinah, Rif Dimashq Governorate. The bodies had several gunshot wounds, indicating, according to SOHR, that their deaths were from a field execution.

The BBC noted the circulation of several videos on social media filled with hate speech against and incitement of violence towards Alawites.

The United Nations Human Rights Office reported that "entire families including women and children" had been killed. The United Nations Refugee Agency reported that more than 6,000 people had fled across the border into northern Lebanon by 11 March. Several families were left homeless due to the destruction and arson of their homes, with many others hiding in forested and mountainous areas in order to avoid the potential return of militants. Displaced residents faced a humanitarian crisis due to severe food, healthcare, and essential goods shortages caused by deprivation of service to the region. Several families, especially among those living in villages on the outskirts of Baniyas, were targeted with direct gunfire from far away. Civilians sheltering at the Russian-controlled Khmeimim Air Base refused to leave the grounds.

The Office of the United Nations High Commissioner for Human Rights documented numerous survivor testimonies stating that militia forces forced themselves into residences, asked the residents if they were Sunni or Alawite, and would execute those who indicated the latter.

==== 12 March ====
On 12 March, SOHR said it had documented further massacres that day in which 158 civilians were killed, the vast majority Alawites: in Hama (Al-Rusafa, 62 killed, and Arza, 22), in Tartous (Baniyas, 34 deaths, and Barmaya, 15), and in Latakia (25 in various locations, including 18 in Sanobar). The death toll reached 1383 by 12 March per the SOHR, with 683 deaths in Latakia, 433 in Tartus, 255 in Hama, and 12 in Homs. SOHR reported five Christians among those killed on 12 March.

The SOHR alleged that burial of massacre victims in mass graves was occurring, asserting that the graves could be manipulated as propaganda by Ministry of Defense forces and associated militias by blaming the mass graves on remnants of the Assad regime.

Rudaw reported that local activists said the massacres had mostly stopped, and there was calm in most Alawite areas, with some bursts of violence along the Syrian-Lebanon border. It reported that the calming of the situation led to Ahmed al-Sharaa to call for national unity, and a ceasefire.

The Syria INGO Regional Forum, a coalition of eighty international non-governmental organizations operating in Syria, reported that large sections of Latakia and Tartus Governorates had no electricity, water, or food due to the deterioration in security from the use of heavy weapons against civilian areas and roadblocks preventing the flow of humanitarian aid. The forum stated that six major hospitals in the region and multiple ambulances were made nonfunctional as a result of the regional violence.

A video appearing to document a Syrian woman in Al-Qabu facing gunmen after they allegedly killed her two children in front of her was spread on Syrian social media platforms. In the video, the gunmen disparaged the women with sectarian anti-Alawite rhetoric. SOHR said that two Shiite civilians were killed: one shot to death as he was returning from work in Al-Zurzuriyah, Homs Governorate, and another found shot to death after being kidnapped a few days prior. SOHR also said that a Christian civilian was shot to death and his fiancée severely injured while driving a motorcycle in Baniyas.

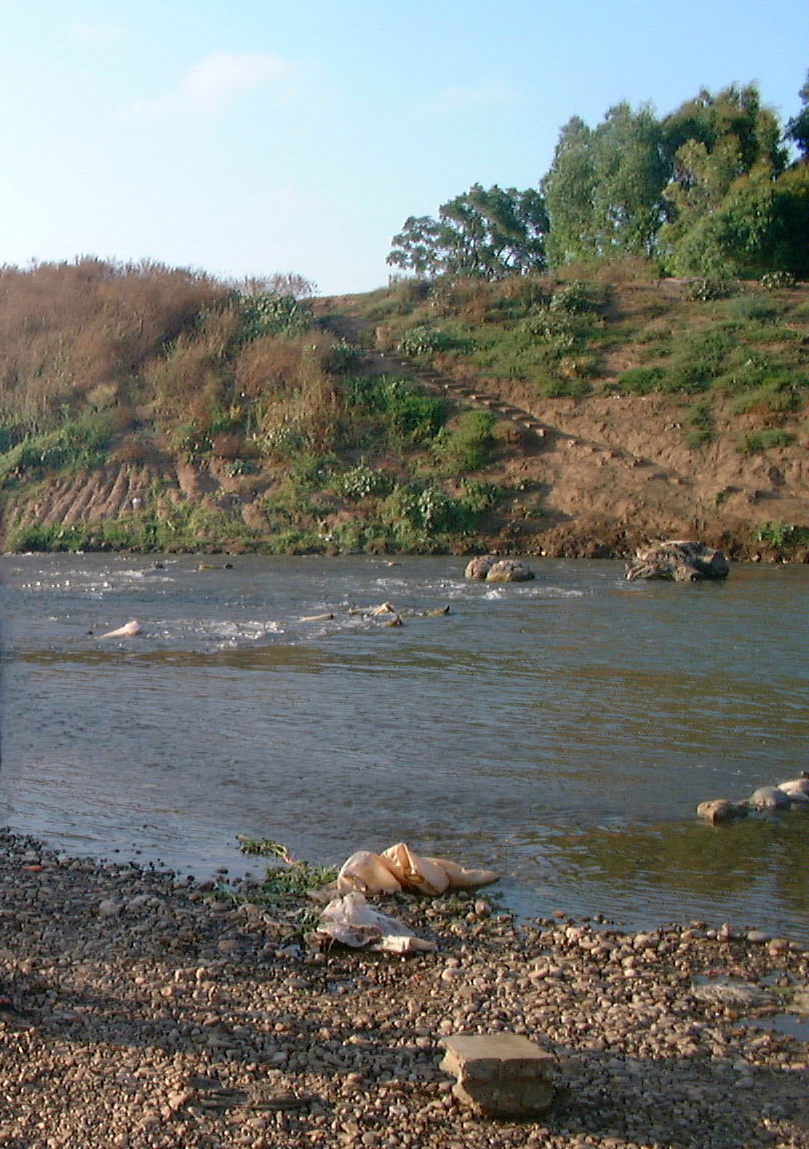
The Nahr al-Kabir river in North Lebanon, across which thousands of refugees fled

The Governor of North Lebanon reported that over 6,000 Alawite refugees had escaped to Lebanese Alawite settlements near the border, with many families crossing the Nahr al-Kabir to do so.

According to the SOHR, military units affiliated Chechen, Turkestani, and Uzbek units began entering Alawite areas carrying SDF flags. The SDF have no presence in the region, and no SDF soldiers had moved from north-east Syria. According to the SOHR, the deployments are intended to create unrest in Alawite regions.

==== 13 March ====
On 13 March, SOHR said it had documented 93 civilians killed in sectarian massacres, the vast majority Alawites, increasing the reported number of killed civilians to 1,476.

SOHR said that residences in Qardaha were "usurped" by gunmen, who then expelled those living in them. They said additional gunmen set forests around Qardaha on fire, as well as several residences and properties located near Qardaha in the Latakia Mountains, including the villages of Baqna, Bishriyeh, Salata, Istamna, and Bishlama. Several pine tree forests and properties were ravaged by the fires, with Civil Defense firefighting groups being unable to reach them. Hundreds of firefighting machines had earlier been confiscated and transported away by Assad regime-associated parties, it said. Local residents fled the villages to escape the fires and violence.

The SOHR demanded that Syrian government authorities specify their use of the term "regime remnants" regarding pro-Assad combatants, and to list their names in official media. The SOHR alleged the widespread justification of killings from pro-government media outlets which called murdered citizens who it said were confirmed to be unarmed (such as one son of Syrian woman who featured in one widely circulating video, whose sons were apparently killed in front of her in Al-Qabu), with many welcoming the new Syrian government, "regime remnants" due to their Alawite background.

==== 14 March ====
On 14 March, SOHR reported 24 civilians killed in two massacres in Latakia and Tartus Governorates, increasing its reported number of deaths from sectarian killings since 6 March to 1,500. SOHR said three civilians were killed in field executions after being seized at the Mawana security checkpoint along a road between Safita and Tartus. It said one of those killed had been conscripted into Syria's compulsory military service four months prior to the fall of Assad's regime, and had been one of the former soldiers who made a legal settlement with the government.

The United Nations Population Fund reported that all life-saving reproductive health facilities and gender-based violence centers had been shut down in the coastal regions due to the regional instability. It also reported that due to widespread curfews and restrictions on entering the coastal regions, all humanitarian missions in the area and attempts to aid displaced families had to be suspended.

==== SOHR allegations against the new government ====
On 14 March, the Syrian Observatory for Human Rights published a series of articles alleging repression by the Damascus government. It did not specify the dates of the alleged incidents.

SOHR alleged that, "according to exclusive information provided to the Observatory", the interim government had implemented significant restrictions on media access to the country's coastal provinces. It alleged that journalists and international media organizations were prohibited from entering the coastal areas, and that existing foreign media personnel were ordered to depart the country within thirty days. According to SOHR, only specific media organizations perceived as sympathetic to the new government were permitted to enter designated areas within the coastal region for reporting purposes. The SOHR said that sources had told it that authorities were restricting the movement of relief teams and humanitarian aid into coastal cities affected by violence. The SOHR characterized the access limitations as "part of a systematic effort to conceal evidence of war crimes and genocide," arguing that restricting journalists' movements represented "a systematic policy to obscure the facts and prevent documentation of violations." The organization said that the isolation of the sites of the massacres from the international community would "paves the way for forced demographic change and the obliteration of evidence of crimes against humanity." It expressed concern that the combination of media restrictions and limitations on humanitarian access could exacerbate suffering in affected communities, while simultaneously reducing international awareness of and response to the ongoing humanitarian crisis.

SOHR said that it had obtained videos recorded by members of Syria's Ministry of Defense personnel which reportedly documented a "sectarian liquidation operation" and the ongoing "hatred and lawlessness" in targeted villages. SOHR said one showed several individuals identified as Ministry of Defense personnel inside an Alawite residence in an unknown village. The footage reportedly captured the body of a male victim, verbal exchanges between personnel using terminology such as "sectarian cleansing", and direct orders from one individual instructing others to kill any remaining occupants through "field execution" and to take no prisoners, and that one individual is seen holding an Alawite religious symbol. SOHR said a second video showed another individual inside a residence in the Safita area of Tartus countryside, making threats against members of the Alawite sect, vowing for revenge against the sect.

The SOHR reported receiving information indicating that members of the Syrian Ministry of Defense had deliberately set fires across the Latakia countryside. Videos sent to the SOHR showed Ministry of Defense forces setting a fire in a village in the countryside of Qardaha. The acts of arson created massive conflagrations spreading across wide areas of the Latakia countryside, resulting in the destruction of forests, agricultural land, as well as both public and private buildings and property. The fires also caused widespread destruction of forests and villages in the Qardaha countryside, with extensive plumes of smoke reported. The SOHR stated that in addition to the significant threat posed to agriculture and the environment, that the fires endangered the lives of civilians who evacuated from their residences to the forests to escape systematic killings.

The SOHR alleged the existence of a coordinated online campaign attempting to reframe the massacres against Alawite civilians as bilateral conflict between opposing forces rather than targeted attacks against a specific community. It alleged that the campaign appeared to coordinate posting patterns, hashtag manipulation, and the artificial amplification of specific narratives, and particularly focused on economically disadvantaged areas with significant Alawite populations. It said the campaign appeared designed to complicate attribution of responsibility by suggesting that violence was occurring on all sides at the site of the massacres in order to help government forces evade responsibility, and that the campaign appeared to try to influence foreign governments' and organizations' understanding of events to minimize international intervention, and to create an impression of popular support for actions against Alawite communities in Damascus. The SOHR said that these narrative manipulation efforts sought to "obscure the truth about the genocide being perpetrated against the Alawites in the Sahel [coastal region]," potentially undermining accountability mechanisms for those responsible for violence. The observatory also condemned the lack of effort in stopping "hate speech and incitement to murder" since the fall of Assad.

==== 16 March ====
On 16 March, SOHR said that five bodies were found with traces of gunfire in the countryside of Tartus and Homs, presumed to be civilian victims of field executions.

SOHR reported that sources told it that Russian forces agreed to bury three bodies at the Khmeimim base. One body was believed to be of a man who had been shot on Khmeimim Bridge; the two others were believed to be those of a woman and her daughter, struck by a drone in their car as they attempted to escape from ongoing violence near a shop towards the refuge of the Khmeimim base. All three bodies reportedly remained out in the open for at least two days until they were able to be brought to the base.

SOHR reported that Syrian government authorities dispatched transportation to relocate Alawite families taking refuge at the Russia-controlled Khmeimim base back to their houses. However, the families refused evacuation, citing their profound distrust of government authorities following what they described as genocidal actions against their communities and the lack of adequate protection guarantees. Many families expressed their fear of becoming victimized by continued violence upon return to their home regions, amid reports of continued targeting of civilians in the Baniyas countryside and nearby regions. Displaced persons at the base reportedly experienced severe shortages of food supplies, essential living necessities, and medical equipment and services.

SOHR reported that a document had circulated that appeared to be the Russian base operators' request to displaced persons to leave due to the return of peace; the SOHR said the document was inauthentic, and that civilians hold told it the Russian had given a free choice of whether to stay or leave, and that the base operators were continuing to provide aid.

Residents of Damascus called for Syrian government forces to reveal what happened to nineteen Alawite civilians who had been arrested on 7 March in the Anaza neighborhood of Qadam, Damascus, amid infractions committed against civilians and their residences in the area. Rumors spread that they had been executed, leading to concerns that their bodies could be secretly disposed of by security forces.

==== 17 March ====
On 17 March, SOHR said massacres were committed in Latakia and Tartus mainly against Alawite Syrians, killing fifty-seven (including 26 in Sonobar), increasing the number of reported civilians massacred since 6 March to 1,557.

SOHR also claimed that internet and telecommunication services from Syriatel and MTN were suddenly shut down in Tartus and Lataika Governorates, forcing the suspension of local business and service operations. It said the shutdown exacerbated existing humanitarian adversity in the region, and alarmed locals to the possibility of a new military and security operation targeting the Syrian coastal region.

==== 19–21 March ====
According to the Institute for the Study of War (ISW), local Alawite social media sources continued to allege acts of sectarian violence by Sunnis and government forces, although these claims could not be verified.

=== April ===
==== 8–10 April ====
The Syrian Observatory for Human Rights reported a marked re-escalation of extrajudicial killings by "unknown gunmen", with sixteen civilians being executed or murdered in 48 hours over 8–10 April, including eight deaths in Homs. Incidents reported by SOHR included the following. On 8 April, General Security Service personnel opened fire on unarmed young men in Latakia and on reported thieves escaping a checkpoint in al-Suqaylabiyah. On 9 April, a Russian-linked former commander of an Iranian-backed armed group was assassinated in Aleppo by unknown gunmen, and revenge attacks were conducted against Assad regime veterans accused of violations.

By 15 April, Alawite civilians were still being killed and harassed, including some who had been opposed to Assad and had never served in the former army.

== Death toll ==
As of 12 March 2025, the UK-based war monitor Syrian Observatory for Human Rights (SOHR) reported that 1,614 civilians were killed by armed groups and security forces supporting the Syrian government between 6 March 2025 and 12 March 2025.

For its part, as of 17 March 2025, the UK-based human rights NGO Syrian Network for Human Rights (SNHR) reported that 1,084 people, including civilians and fighters, were killed in the clashes since 6 March. The SNHR attributed 639 of the deaths, including civilians and disarmed combatants as killed by forces aligned with the Syrian transitional government. It further alleges in its report that armed remnants of the former Assad regime were also responsible for the deaths of at least 231 civilians.

An investigation by Reuters published on 30 June 2025 concluded that 1,479 Alawites were killed across 40 different sites in a pattern of ethnically-targeted killing.

== Perpetrators ==
Suspected perpetrators according to Maggie Michael's June 2025 Reuters investigation and the United Nations Human Rights Council investigation published in August 2025 include five main groups responsible for the mass killings of Alawites:

- HTS units including Unit 400, whose fighters were seen in December 2024 as having had "high levels of training and equipped with the most modern weaponry", the Othman Brigade, and the General Security Service;
- Turkish-backed militias, the Sultan Suleiman Shah Division, the Hamza division, of the Syrian National Army and Ahrar al-Sham;
- Sunni factions Jaysh al-Islam, Jaysh al-Ahrar and Jaysh al-Izza;
- foreign fighters, including the Turkistan Islamic Party, Uzbeks, Chechens, and "some Arab fighters"; and
- armed Sunni civilians.

In late July 2025, a Syrian investigative committee submitted two lists of suspects, out of an initial list of 298 people, to courts. Human Rights First (HRF) criticised the committee's press conference summarising its findings as having "effectively absolved the government of any responsibility" for the groups suspected of having carried out the massacres and for having described government forces as having had a "high degree of discipline" and being "focused on protecting civilians and upholding the law." HRF called for the committee's report to be made public.

== Further developments ==
=== Displacement ===
The United Nations High Commissioner for Refugees (UNHCR) reported that more than 6,000 people had fled across the border into northern Lebanon by 11 March. The United Nations Population Fund estimated on 14 March that 51,000 civilians had been displaced due to the violence, including 6,000 in Lebanon.

A Reuters investigation published at the end of April reported that since January hundreds and possibly thousands of people, mostly Alawites, had been evicted from their homes in Damascus suburbs, sometimes at gunpoint, in many cases by gunmen affiliated to the General Security Service. Syrian human rights groups such as Syrians for Truth and Justice, government officials and Alawite residents had told Reuters that most had been in government housing attached to state jobs they no longer had, but that hundreds were in private residences evicted in "sectarian score-settling", often to rehouse displaced families returning from Idlib.

In August 2025, the al-Sumaria neighborhood in Damascus was victimised by a large-scale displacement of Alawite families residing in the area. These measures were accompanied by restrictions on movement, discriminatory rhetoric, and raids, and the forcible removal of residents from their homes. Subsequently, the population of the neighbourhood declined by 80-85%, from 22,000 to 3,000.

=== Kidnappings ===
In the first few months of 2025, as many as 33 Alawite women and girls were kidnapped, some being forced into marriage by their kidnappers. Others have faced enforced disappearance. By July 2025, 50–60 Alawite women were estimated to have been kidnapped to be held as sabaya sex slaves.

The kidnappings and disappearance of the Alawite women has been met with silence from the Syrian government which has generally denied any sectarian nature in these events and has disincentivised their discussion.

=== Mass incarcerations ===
In the weeks after the rebel offensive seized Damascus, hundreds of Alawite men were arrested by the new authorities and often imprisoned in Assad-era prisons that had previously been emptied. These arrests targeting Alawites spiked following the massacre and the 6 March uprising, and have not ceased since. Following massacres of the Druze in the south of the country in the summer, mass detentions targeting the Druze were carried out. A report by Reuters found that others targeted by these campaigns other than Alawites and Druze include: "many from Syria’s Sunni majority, accused of vague links to Assad; human-rights activists; Christians who say they have been shaken down for information or money; Shi’ites picked up at checkpoints and accused of ties with Iran or Hezbollah." The total number of Alawites and others incarcerated was estimated at 829 by December 2025, though is likely to be significantly higher. Abuse and neglect were found to be common, as well as extortion, torture, and unrecorded deaths.

=== Trials ===
On 18 November 2025, 14 people were brought to Aleppo's Palace of Justice for a preliminary hearing related to the violence and massacres. Half of them were members of government forces while the rest were alleged Assad loyalists. A second hearing convened for the alleged Assad loyalists on 18 December 2025. A session for defendants linked to pro-government forces is scheduled for 22 December. The hearings were scheduled to conclude on 25 December.

On 8 March 2026, Syria's Ministry of Justice announced that the Aleppo Criminal Court continued the trials in the presence of the public and human rights groups. The session was postponed previously due to the need of expert analysis and requests from defense attorneys. During the session, 7 alleged Assadist defendants appeared as the prosecution presented videos of individuals holding weapons, attacking civilians, and threatening government forces. The judges agreed to 15 March as the date for the defense to call witnesses.

The investigations into the massacres were largely performative, with police rarely investigating murders and thefts in Alawite areas. Though government officials responded to such evaluations by saying that they face constrained resources in investigating the killings, other legal experts commented that this 'evading responsibility and covering up the facts by making up excuses.' The commission made to investigate the killings praised the government forces' discipline in responding to the killings, though this position was criticised by The New Arab who wrote 'Although in some cases government forces intervened to protect civilians, a Reuters investigation was able to determine that high-ranking Ministry of Defence officials were reportedly supportive of violations being committed against Alawite civilians.' It also found that 'alleged perpetrators and instigators of sectarian violence seem to operate undisturbedly online.'

On 17 September 2026, the Aleppo Criminal Court sentenced a Syrian Army 52nd Division soldier, Basel Meri al-Hassan, to 20 years in prison for intentional homicide in relation to the massacre. Two accused Assad loyalists, Tahani Ahmed Shafik and Hadi Qabalan, received life and death sentences, respectively, for participating in illegal armed groups, sedition, homicide, and looting. Hassan Hleibeh was acquitted after presenting an alibi of working in Lebanon at the time of the violence. The verdicts are pending appeal in the Court of Cassation.

Basel Meri's brother, Abdo, criticized the verdict for scapegoating rather than holding military leaders accountable. Abdulrahman Nahawi, an attorney serving as an observer for the Syria Justice and Accountability Centre, stated the trial highlights improvements in the legal process post-Assad; though flaws in legal defense procedures remain, such as different lawyers for one defendant at multiple hearings.

== Responses ==
=== Domestic ===
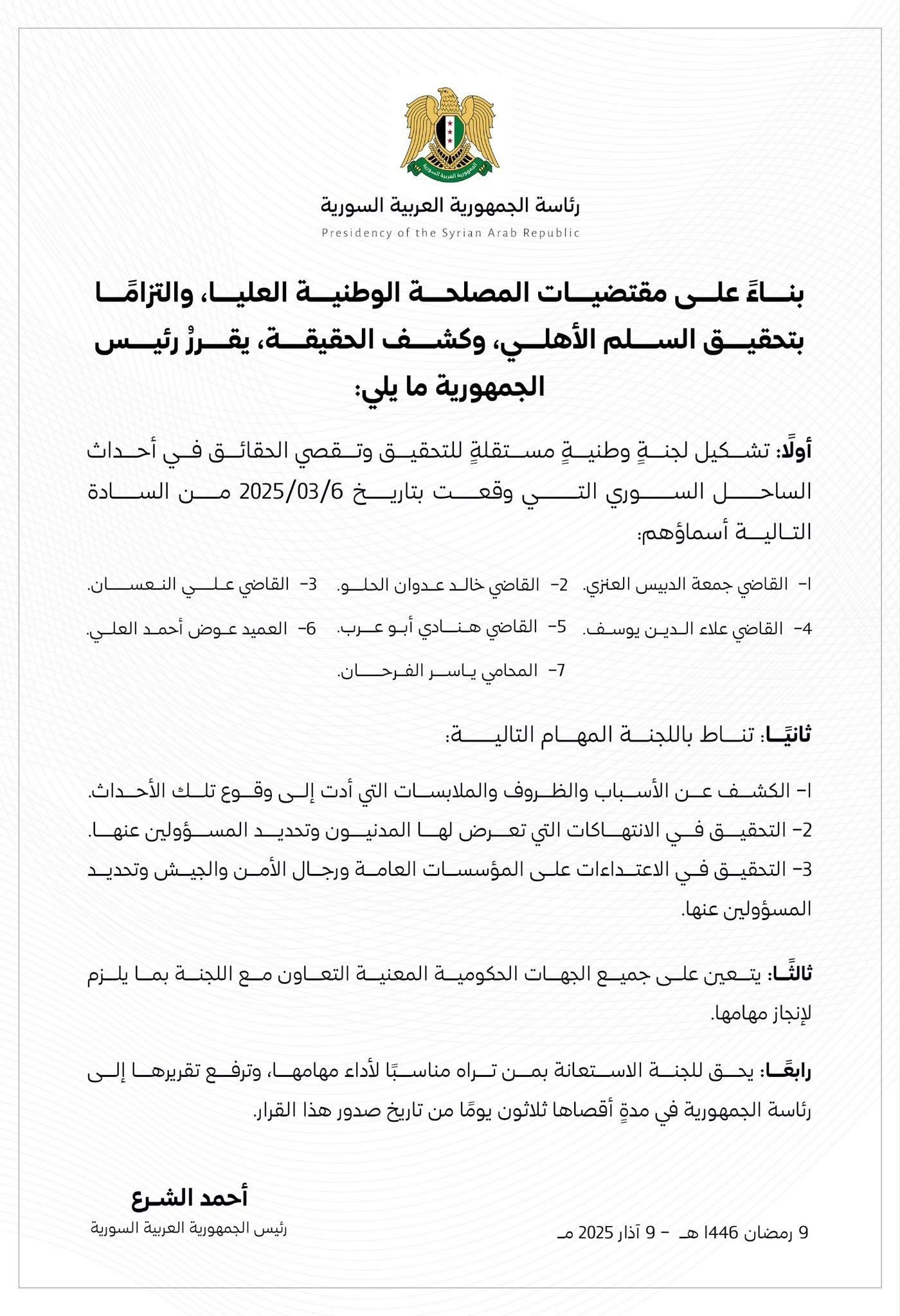
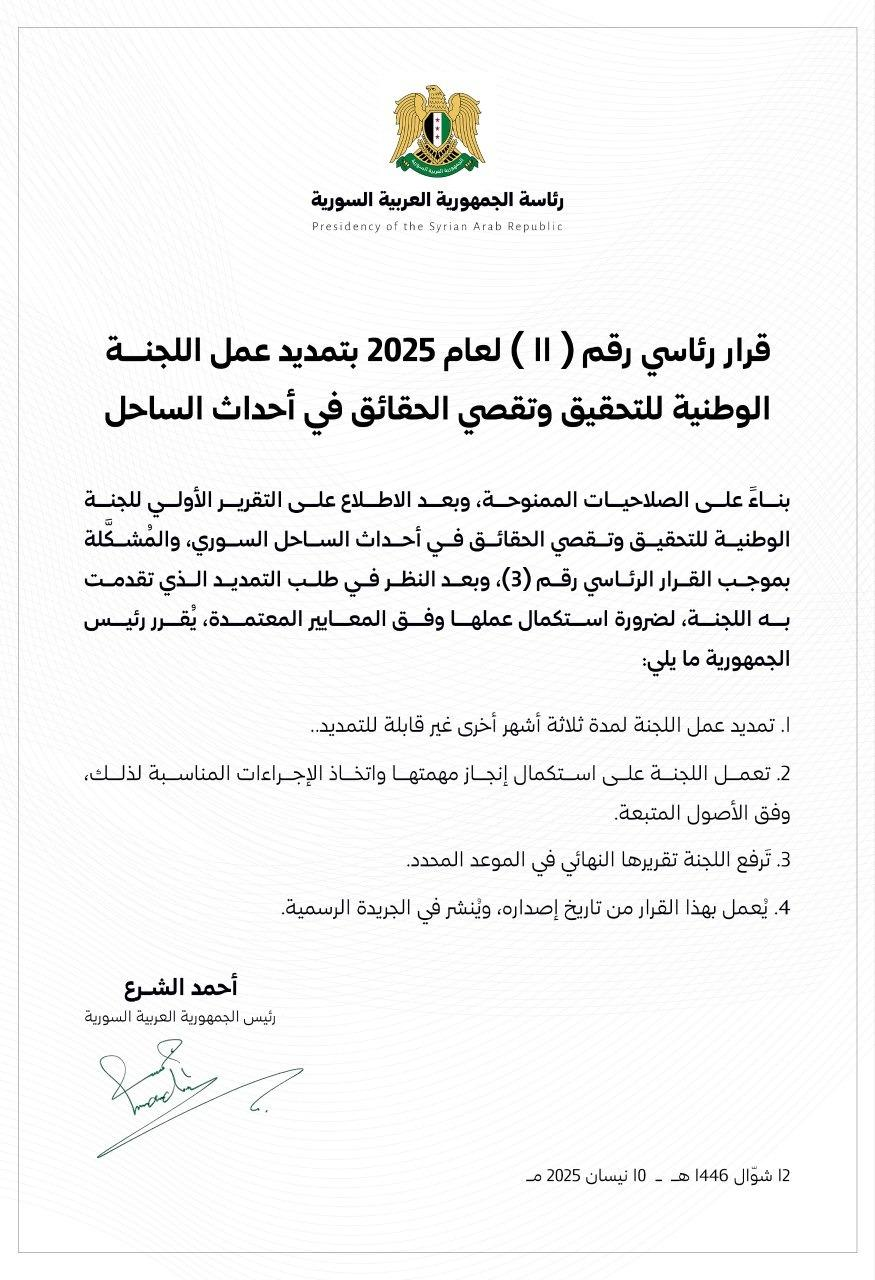
Relevant presidential decrees

On 7 March, the advisor to the former Alawite Council president, Muhammad Nasser, claimed to Hezbollah newspaper Al-Ahed that entire families had been executed. He alleged that over 1,700 civilians had been killed. The Syrian Democratic Forces' Hawar News Agency gave the same figure, citing "local sources".

The Alawite Islamic Council released a statement attributing responsibility for the violence to the government. The council claimed that military convoys had been dispatched to the coastal region under the pretext of targeting "regime remnants" but were instead "terrorizing and killing Syrians." The organization called for United Nations protection for the coastal territories.

The Syrian government's news agency SANA acknowledged "some individual violations" following attacks by pro-Assad forces that had resulted in police casualties, stating that authorities were "working to stop them." The agency also reported that several individuals traveled to Alawite coastal settlements to carry out revenge for attacks against the government.

The Syrian General Intelligence Service accused "former military and security leaders affiliated with the defunct regime [of being] behind the planning of these crimes" regarding the cause of the escalated violence. The Ministry of Defense stated that government units had successfully re-taken areas where pro-Assad forces attacked its forces.

Later that day the Syrian presidency announced the formation of a seven-member independent committee to investigate the incidents. This committee is tasked with examining violations against civilians, identifying those responsible, and has the authority to question individuals as part of its inquiry. They are required to submit a comprehensive report within 30 days, after which those found culpable will be referred to the judiciary for prosecution.

In a speech addressing Syrian people on 8 March, Syrian President Ahmed al-Sharaa stated: "Some remnants of the fallen regime attempted to test the new Syria they do not understand. Today, they see it as united, from east to west, from north to south, ...". Condemning the attacks against police forces, hospitals and civilians by Assadist insurgents, al-Sharaa said: "You attacked all Syrians and made an unforgivable mistake. The riposte has come, and you have not been able to withstand it." He demanded that they surrender their arms "before it's too late." He stated that he would "continue to work towards monopolizing weapons in the hands of the state, and there will be no more unregulated weapons." Al-Sharaa urged pro-government fighters to "avoid any abuses" after reports emerged of massacres of Alawite civilians in Latakia.

On 8 March 2025, the Syrian Ministry of Defense said that it wouldn't let violations be committed by the Syrian Army's Forces or any other armed militants, and that an emergency committee was formed to refer disobeying units to a military court. The spokesman of the Ministry of Defense Hassan Abdul Ghani urged militants who have no connection to the military operation in the Syrian coast to leave the area. However, Reuters would later report that on 9 March, a Telegram account believed to belong to Abdul Ghani responded "May God reward you" to a report of "breaches" of conduct by government-aligned fighters Jableh town.

On 8 March, the International Committee of the Red Cross in Syria posted on social media that the organization was "extremely concerned" about the reported violence, and insisted that all parties involved not target medical facilities, allow for unhindered health care access, and allow for humanitarian workers to reach the injured and dead.

On 9 March 2025, President al-Sharaa issued a decision to form an independent national committee to investigate and find the facts about the events and violations that took place in the Syrian coastal areas since 6 March 2025. The committee was tasked with uncovering the circumstances and conditions that led to those events, and the violations against civilians, government forces and security personnel that occurred, and identifying those responsible and bringing them to justice. al-Sharaa stressed that the committee, consisting of seven judges, should submit its report to the president of the Republic within a maximum period of 30 days from the date of issuance of the decision. al-Sharaa described the violence along the coast as a part of "expected challenges".

Mohammed al-Jassem, commander of the new army's 62nd Division and the former Sultan Suleiman Shah Division, denied that any of his men had been involved in the killings, despite reports that they had been.

Reuters reported witness testimony that factions of government-aligned fighters tried to protect civilians from being killed by uniformed government personnel at three different locations during the massacres of March 7-9. Many Alawite survivors of the massacres also said their Sunni neighbors tried to help or protect them.

==== Syrian Democratic Forces ====
The Syrian Democratic Forces (SDF) condemned the violence against the Alawites, with Mazloum Abdi calling on al-Sharaa to hold the perpetrators of the massacres accountable, and to stop the violence. Abdi stated extremist groups were attempting to "create sectarian conflicts and settle internal scores" across Syria.

On 10 March 2025, President al-Sharaa condemned the mass killings of Alawites, emphasizing that such violence threatens national unity. He pledged to hold all perpetrators accountable, including those within his own ranks, stating, "We won't accept that any blood be shed unjustly, or goes without punishment or accountability, even among those closest to us". Al-Sharaa attributed the initial violence to pro-Assad groups backed by foreign entities but acknowledged subsequent revenge attacks. He stated that he was committed to uphold the rule of law and prevent Syria from descending into sectarian conflict. On 10 March 2025, the SDF signed the 10 March agreement with the Syrian transitional government to integrate SDF-controlled institutions into the state, open border crossings, and a commitment to combat remnants of the former regime. The DAANES later rejected a new drafted Syrian constitution, the Syrian Democratic Council warned of increased violence in Syria, sectarianism, and authoritarianism. On 6 June, the Syrian government's Supreme Fatwa Council issued a fatwa banning all forms of extrajudicial killing, including tribal clashes and vigilantism.

==== Syrian Druze community ====
Bahaa al-Jamal, described by Kurdish outlet Rudaw Media Network as the commander of Druze operations in Suwayda, told Rudaw that he condemned the massacres of Alawites, emphasizing that the victims were unarmed civilians and not "remnants of the [Assad] regime" as stated in the accounts of HTS and al-Sharaa. He stated that the violence was leading to insecurity for other minorities but the Druze had substantial military capability with "thousands of military personnel" and the right to defend themselves if confronted by government forces.

==== Demonstrations ====
On 9 March, activists in Damascus organized a "silent demonstration", mourning the mass killing of citizens and the deaths of government security forces during the clashes, and advocating for national unity. Approximately several dozen people gathered for this memorial protest, with some participants displaying placards stating "Syrian lives are not cheap."

This initial gathering was soon confronted by counter-demonstrators who chanted anti-Alawite sentiments and called for a "Sunni Muslim state." Physical altercations erupted between the opposing groups of protesters, with counter-protesters accusing initial protesters of ignoring the slaughter of Sunni Muslims under Assad's regime. Members of the original protests responded by stating that they could settle "your score with Assad, we have nothing to do with his crimes." Security forces intervened to end the confrontation, firing warning shots into the air to disperse the crowds.

Also on 9 March, activists in the mainly-Druze city of Suwayda organized a demonstration in Al-Karamah Square condemning the sectarian-oriented massacres against coastal Syrians, and demanded an end to state violence and reprisals towards civilians. Many protesters carried banners juxtaposing the then-ongoing massacres alongside prior massacres under the Assad regime. Several protesters and residents articulated that it is a crime to kill civilians no matter who the perpetrator was, and insisted that the Syrian revolution against the Assad regime was for "a dignified life, not for revenge".

Protests occurred in SDF cities in Hasakah and Qamishli on 12 March, holding banners condemning the recent violence, and photos of recent violence. Protestors called for the perpetrators of the violence to be held accountable and protection of Alawite areas.

In November 2025, thousands in Syria protested against the treatment of Alawites. In a demonstration held in Latakia on 25 November, Syrian security forces used gunfire to break up two rival groups of demonstrators, with one person being injured. An opposition war monitor said security forces opened fire, wounding one person, while authorities said they protected the protesters, according to state media. Noureddine el-Brimo, the head of media relations in Latakia province, stated security forces had fired into the air to disperse the rival protesters, and added that unknown assailants had also fired on civilians and on the security forces.

=== International ===
- Australia: The Department of Foreign Affairs and Trade stated that the Government of Australia was "deeply concerned" by the rising violence in Syria and assaults against civilians. The government insisted that all parties show restraint, and that they follow international law with regards to protecting civilians.
- Canada: On 12 March, Canadian officials condemned the "atrocities" perpetrated against Alawite civilians in western Syria. On the same day, the Canadian government announced plans to ease many of its financial sanctions imposed on Syria during the Assad regime while allowing designated banking channels for money transfers, such as the Central Bank of Syria. Canadian Special Envoy to Syria Omar Alghabra stated that the lifted sanctions would allow Canada to aid in constructing an "inclusive" and more stable, peaceful Syrian state with equal rights for its citizens.
- France: On 8 March, the Ministry for Europe and Foreign Affairs issued a statement that condemned all sectarian and civilian-involved violence occurring in Syria, and requested that the Syrian transitional government employ independeal-Sharaa investigations to sentence the perpetrators of the regional violence and killings. The Government of France reiterated its hopes for a "peaceful and inclusive political transition" in Syria to protect the nation from violence and fragmentation.

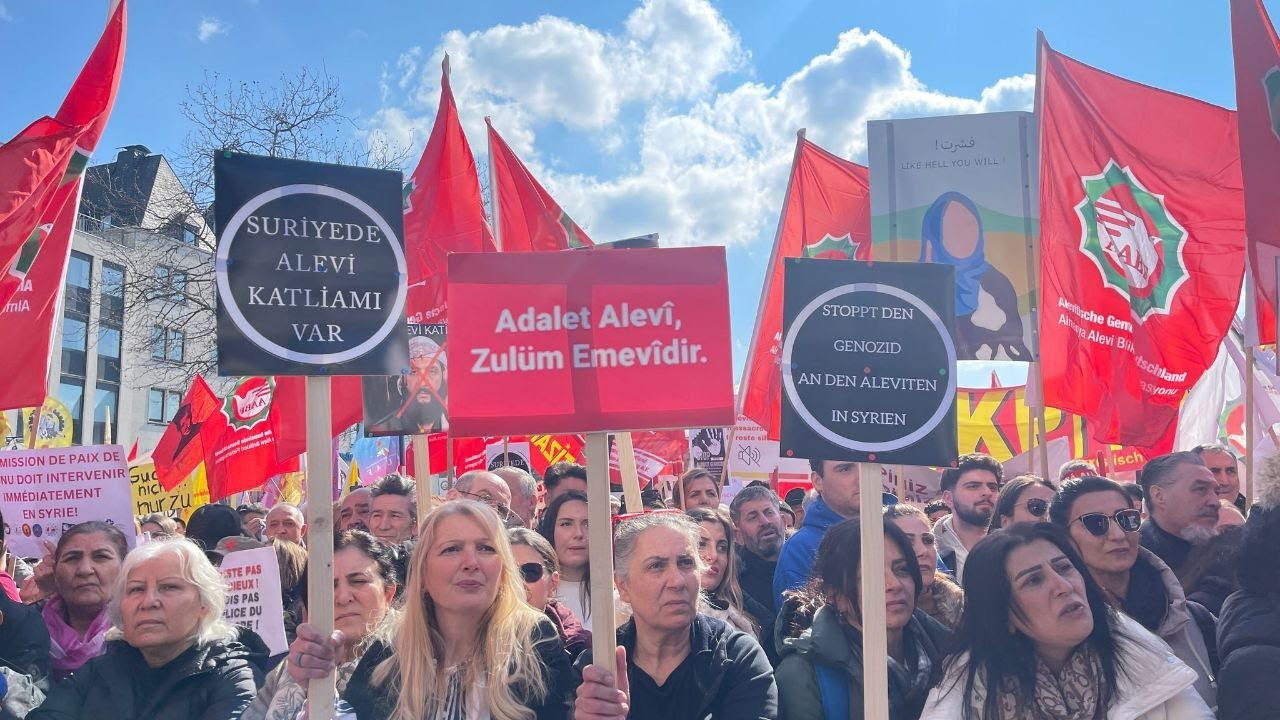
Protest in Cologne, Germany, against the Alawite massacres in Syria, March 2025.

- Germany: On 7 March 2025, the Foreign Ministry urged all parties involved in the ongoing conflict in Syria to avoid further escalation of violence. In a statement, the ministry expressed concern over the rising number of casualties in western Syria, calling for peaceful solutions and national unity. The statement read: "We are shocked by the numerous victims in the western regions of Syria. We call on all sides to seek peaceful solutions, national unity, inclusive political dialogue and transitional justice, and to overcome the spiral of violence and hatred."
- Greece: The Ministry of Foreign Affairs released a statement expressing deep alarm at the escalated violence and civilian casualties reported, urging de-escalation from all parties and security for all religious and ethnic groups. Foreign Minister Giorgos Gerapetritis reportedly expressed the necessity of maintaining the safety of Christian populations and other minorities during a phone call with Greek Orthodox Patriarch of Antioch John X.
- Houthi movement: Leader Abdul-Malik al-Houthi condemned the mass killing of civilians and publishing of such killing on social media. He accused Syrian Takfiri groups of committing genocide against defenseless citizens. He further accused Europe and the United States of enabling their ability to commit such acts without deterrence in order to destabilize the nation while Israel, the U.S., and Arab nations portrayed themselves as heroes to the Syrians. He characterized the brutality of Takfiri violence as "American, Israeli, Zionist, Jewish engineering".
- Iran: The Foreign Ministry proclaimed that there was "no justification" for the massacres committed against Alawites, Druze, Christians, and other minorities. The ministry's spokesperson described the attacks as having "truly wounded the emotions and conscience" of nearby nations in addition to the broader international community.
- Israel: The Defense Minister Israel Katz characterized Syrian President Ahmed al-Sharaa (referred to by Katz under his nom de guerre "Al-Julani") as "a jihadist terrorist from the Al-Qaeda school, committing atrocities against the Alawite civilian population." Katz affirmed Israel's intention to continue to occupy Syrian territory, defend communities in the Israeli-occupied Golan Heights and Israel's Galilee regions, ensure southern Syria's demilitarization, and defend the local Druze population.
- Kazakhstan: Foreign Minister Murat Nurtileu stated during an extraordinary Organization of Islamic Cooperation gathering to address the escalations in Syria and Palestine that Kazakhstan had been monitoring the events in Syria closely since their start. He called for organization's member nations to take active steps towards stabilizing the ongoing unrest while following the Syrian people's best interests.
- Lebanon: Free Patriotic Movement leader Gebran Bassil described the violence as a significant danger to Lebanon in addition to Syria, and warned that a spillover of sectarian violence could fracture the unity of the nation. He urged for different Lebanese sects of Christianity and Islam to respect one another and avoid possible causes of division.
- Netherlands: Fourth Rutte cabinet State Secretary for Justice and Security Eric van der Burg condemned the official European Union response to the massacres, stating that it "reverses the roles of perpetrators and victims. The regime is responsible here." New Social Contract party leader Pieter Omtzigt also condemned the European Union's response, describing it as "a bizarre statement" based on the "many horrific images of summary executions that appear to be the work of the new rulers and their allies."
- Russia: Kremlin Press Secretary Dmitry Peskov said that Russia "wants to see Syria united, prosperous, and friendly," and that it is in contact with other countries on the "Syrian issue." Russia's UN ambassador, compared the sectarian and ethnic killings in Syria to the Rwandan genocide in 1994.
- Turkey: Turkish president Recep Tayyip Erdoğan declared, "As Turkey, we strongly condemn all attacks, acts of terrorism, and intimidation that target Syria's unity, stability, and social peace." Speaking after the cabinet meeting, Erdoğan stated, "With the effective intervention of Syrian government forces, the incidents have largely been brought under control, but the situation on the ground remains sensitive." Erdoğan defended that al-Sharaa is pursuing an inclusive policy "without falling into the trap of revanchism." On the other hand, Turkish parliament member and DEM Party co-chairs, Tülay Hatimoğulları and Tuncer Bakırhan, issued a written statement criticizing the new Syrian administration's policies. They expressed concern that the administration excluded Kurds, Alawites, Druze, women, and other groups from key political processes such as forming a transitional government and drafting a constitution. The statement also condemned massacres targeting Alawites in Latakia and Tartus, attributing them to the administration's exclusionary policies, and noted similar incidents in Hama, Homs, and nearby villages. It warned that these events showed the civil war was still ongoing and described the situation as one of the largest massacres of Alawites in modern history, unfolding in full view of the international community. Parliament member and the chairman of the Republican People's Party, Özgür Özel, expressed deep concern over the increasing violence against Alawites in Latakia and the surrounding areas, which has resulted in rising civilian casualties. Özel criticized the Turkish government's previous optimistic rhetoric about a resolution in Syria, stating that the renewed clashes have dispelled this illusion. He also highlighted the anxiety felt by Turkish Alawites with relatives in the affected regions and expressed solidarity with their concerns. Özel called on the government to take more effective diplomatic steps with the Syrian administration to prevent further civilian casualties.
- United Arab Emirates: The foreign ministry condemned the attacks by armed insurgents targeting the Syrian security forces and asserted that the UAE supported "Syria's stability, sovereignty and territorial integrity."
- United Council of Sheikhs and Notables of Basra and Iraq: The council accused Turkey, Saudi Arabia, and Jordan of empowering "takfiris and terrorist organizations in Syria," alleging that these states enabled HTS leader Abu Mohammad al-Julani's faction to commit "the most brutal crimes".

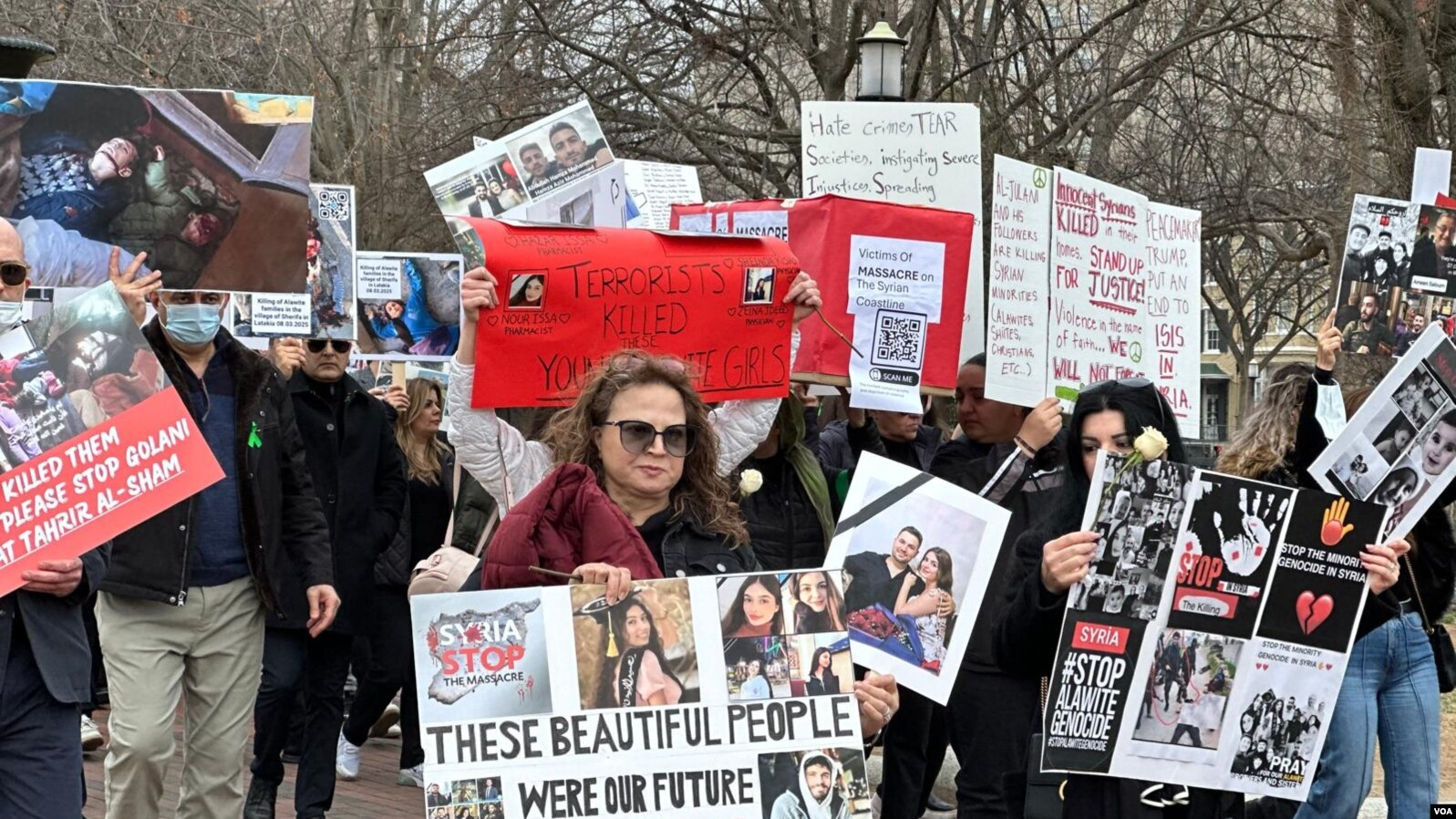
Protest in Washington D.C.

- United States: US Secretary of State Marco Rubio condemned the killings and offered condolences. He further indicated that "the United States stands with Syria's religious and ethnic minorities, including its Christian, Druze, Alawite, and Kurdish communities" and that the "perpetrators of these massacres against Syria's minority communities" should be held accountable.
- (Iraq) Ya Ali Popular Formations: The group has stated it will take action on perpetrators of violence against Syrian Alawites, citing Iraqi government inaction as justification.
- Kurdish advocacy groups: A large coalition of Kurdish human rights organizations, including the Kurdish Human Rights Network in Syria, strongly condemned the escalated violence in coastal Syria. They demanded that the international community enforce independent investigations into war crimes against Alawites. The coalition of organizations released a list of demands which included "an end to all forms of ethnic cleansing and racial persecution against Syria's diverse communities", a withdrawal of militias and military units from populated settlements to military bases, the creation of "independent civilian bodies to maintain security, free from military coercion", and the disclosure of facts behind missing persons and enforced disappearances.
- Kurdistan Communities Union: The Kurdistan Communities Union condemned the violence against Alawites, and said multiple groups within Syrian were under threat of massacres and genocide.
- A joint statement by Greek Orthodox Patriarch of Antioch John X, Patriarch of the Syriac Orthodox Church Ignatius Aphrem II, and Melkite Greek Catholic Patriarch of Antioch Youssef Absi strongly condemned the "massacres targeting innocent citizens", specifically mentioning the killing of women and children, the raiding and looting of their homes, and the "immense suffering endured by the Syrian people". The statement called for Syria to give equal rights and "genuine partnership" to all its citizens of different backgrounds, separate from the "logic of vengeance and exclusion".
- Democratic Autonomous Administration of North and East Syria: The Syrian Democratic Council of the Democratic Autonomous Administration of North and East Syria accused Syrian President Ahmed al-Sharaa of "repeating what former President Bashar al-Assad did" regarding the coastal massacres. The council further stated that the present Syrian transitional constitution was "illegitimate", and contradicted an earlier agreement between Syrian Democratic Forces with al-Sharaa regarding Rojava's integration into Syria. It stated in light of the massacres that "promoting Sharia law in state administration is leading the country toward chaos".

=== Supranational ===
- Arab Parliament: The Speaker of the Arab Parliament, Mohammed Ahmed Al-Yamahi, condemned the attacks carried out by armed groups against Syrian security forces, and emphasized its support for Syrian government institutions while rejecting any attempts to undermine the nation's stability, internal affairs, or civil peace.
- European Union: On 8 March, a statement from the European Union External Action diplomatic service on behalf of the European Union condemned attacks by "pro-Assad elements" on transitional government armed forces, and attacks on civilians. The European Union further condemned all attempts to undermine the nation's stability and "prospects for a lasting peaceful transition, inclusive and respectful of all Syrians in their diversity". On 11 March, EU foreign policy chief Kaja Kallas condemned "in the strongest terms" the attacks by pro-Assad militias on Syrian government forces and "the horrific crimes committed against civilians, including summary executions, many of them allegedly perpetrated by armed groups supporting the security forces of the transitional authorities." She "welcomed" Syrian President Ahmed al-Sharaa's commitment to launch an investigation into the massacres.
- United Nations: The United Nations called for an immediate investigation into the reports of targeted killings based on religious identity. Human rights organizations emphasized the need for independent investigators to access the sites to document potential war crimes or crimes against humanity. Several countries issued statements condemning violence against civilians and urging restraint from all parties involved in the Syrian conflict. International organizations expressed concern about potential sectarian violence in the region following reports of targeted killings. Geir Pedersen, United Nations Special Envoy for Syria, expressed alarm regarding the intense clashes and killings, noting "very troubling reports of civilian casualties" in coastal areas between forces of the current Syrian administration Alawite pro-Assad holdouts.

According to Thameen Al-Kheetan, the spokesperson for the Office of the United Nations High Commissioner for Human Rights, "entire families" have been killed, with Alawites targeted, in particular. The Office reported receiving numerous accounts of large-scale killings in Alawite-majority towns and villages, where entire households—including women, children, and individuals not involved in the fighting—were massacred. Witnesses described assailants raiding homes and questioning residents whether they were Alawite or Sunni, deciding whether to kill or spare them based on their Alawite or Sunni identity. Some accounts also spoke of men being shot in front of their families.

==== Demonstrations ====
In Hatay and Adana provinces in Southern Turkey, multiple Alevi advocacy groups organized protests against the mass killings. Many speakers accused the Turkish government of facilitating crimes against humanity as a result of it granting military support to Syria. Protesters also condemned the perceived silence by Turkish officials and the public regarding the acts, and called upon both to resist the present Syrian government and support the Syrian people. The Democratic Alevi Federation and the Democratic Alevi Women's Union released a joint statement in support of the Syrian Alawite community, condemning Hayat Tahrir al-Sham, the Syrian National Army, and the Islamic State for carrying out a genocide against the Alawites.

Protestors in Turkey condemned the Turkish government for its support for the Syrian Armed Forces' actions against Alawites which they said amounted to crimes against humanity. Samandağ Mayor Emrah Karaçay said, "The massacres in Syria are moving toward genocide."

Protests took place during the evening of 12 March in the primarily Shia town of Al-Kadhimiya, located in northern Baghdad, Iraq. The protests denounced the crimes committed by Syrian forces and urged the international community to stop ongoing genocidal acts.

On 15 March, 100–150 protesters held a demonstration outside the International Criminal Court (ICC) in The Hague, Netherlands, demanding action against the persecution of Syrian Alawites and Christians. Protesters carried placards containing phrases such as "Just one of the massacres" and "Stop the slaughter, no more bloodshed". The protest occurred simultaneously with and without association to another demonstration in favor of former President of the Philippines Rodrigo Duterte, following his arrest. During the protest, about six to seven counter-protesters intruded on the demonstration, resulting in physical confrontations between both parties and requiring police to break up the hostilities.

==== Human rights groups ====
On 10 March, Human Rights Watch deputy Middle East and North Africa director Adam Coogle lamented the onset of the sectarian murders despite the fact that "Syria's new leaders promised to break with the horrors of the past". He stated that no peace and stability in Syria would last if the government did not hold accountable every individual who committed human rights abuses, no matter their background or current allegiance.

On 10 March, MENA Regional Director of Amnesty International Heba Morayef demanded that the Syrian government immediately act to stop extrajudicial killings and other acts of injustice against citizens, bemoaning that Syrian communities "once again are being forced to endure unimaginable loss" through the repetition of "past cycles of atrocities". She emphasized that the Syrian government's failure to immediately act and carry out effective investigations without bias or favoritism would invigorate further acts of violence by parties with impunity. She believed that there would be no reason for Syrian civilians to trust any findings of the government if the process was not fully transparent or not conducted with independent international organizations. She stated that President al-Sharaa's words vowing justice against perpetrators would mean little without the participation of victims, an upholding of equal human rights for all communities, and for making sure that "never again really means never again". In a separate statement dated 3 April 2025, the organization stated that it had investigated 32 of the killings and concluded that they were deliberate, targeted at the Alawite minority sect, and unlawful. The organization added that such deliberate killings constitute war crimes and urged the Syrian government to ensure prompt, independent, and effective investigations, hold perpetrators accountable, and end discriminatory targeting based on sect.

On 10 March, Euro-Mediterranean Human Rights Monitor released a statement saying the arbitrary arrest campaigns leading to extra-judicial executions and torture by Syrian government forces had no justifiable excuse. The organization said that the crimes driven by revenge were not justice, and instead "fuel for an endless cycle of violence" requiring reconciliation and transitional justice in addition to legal accountability to ensure justice and the prevention of future crimes.

The Lemkin Institute for Genocide Prevention issued an alert on 12 March about the risk of genocide that the violence could lead to.

==== Alawite and Christian advocacy groups ====
On 10 March, the Muslim Alawite Advocacy Group in Australia called on the Australian government and the general public to condemn the massacres, and to show solidarity with minority groups.

On 10 March, Christian Solidarity International formally issued a genocide warning for regions of Syria under the control of Hay'at Tahrir al-Sham, describing the massacres as an "orgy of targeted killings, accompanied by dehumanizing hate speech." The organization demanded that members of the United Nations, especially those of the Security Council, to intervene under obligation of international law to stop genocidal acts and protect targeted civilians.

== See also ==
- Aqrab massacre
- Maan massacre
- Adra massacre
- 2013 Latakia offensive
- Homs school bombing
- Zara'a attack
- February 2016 Homs bombings
- 2025 massacres of Syrian Druze
- List of massacres during the Syrian civil war
- List of massacres in Syria
- 2025 Homs mosque bombing
