= Federalization of Syria =

Scenario to end the Syrian Civil War

Governorates and districts of Syria

Syrian Civil War frontlines until the opposition offensives of 2024

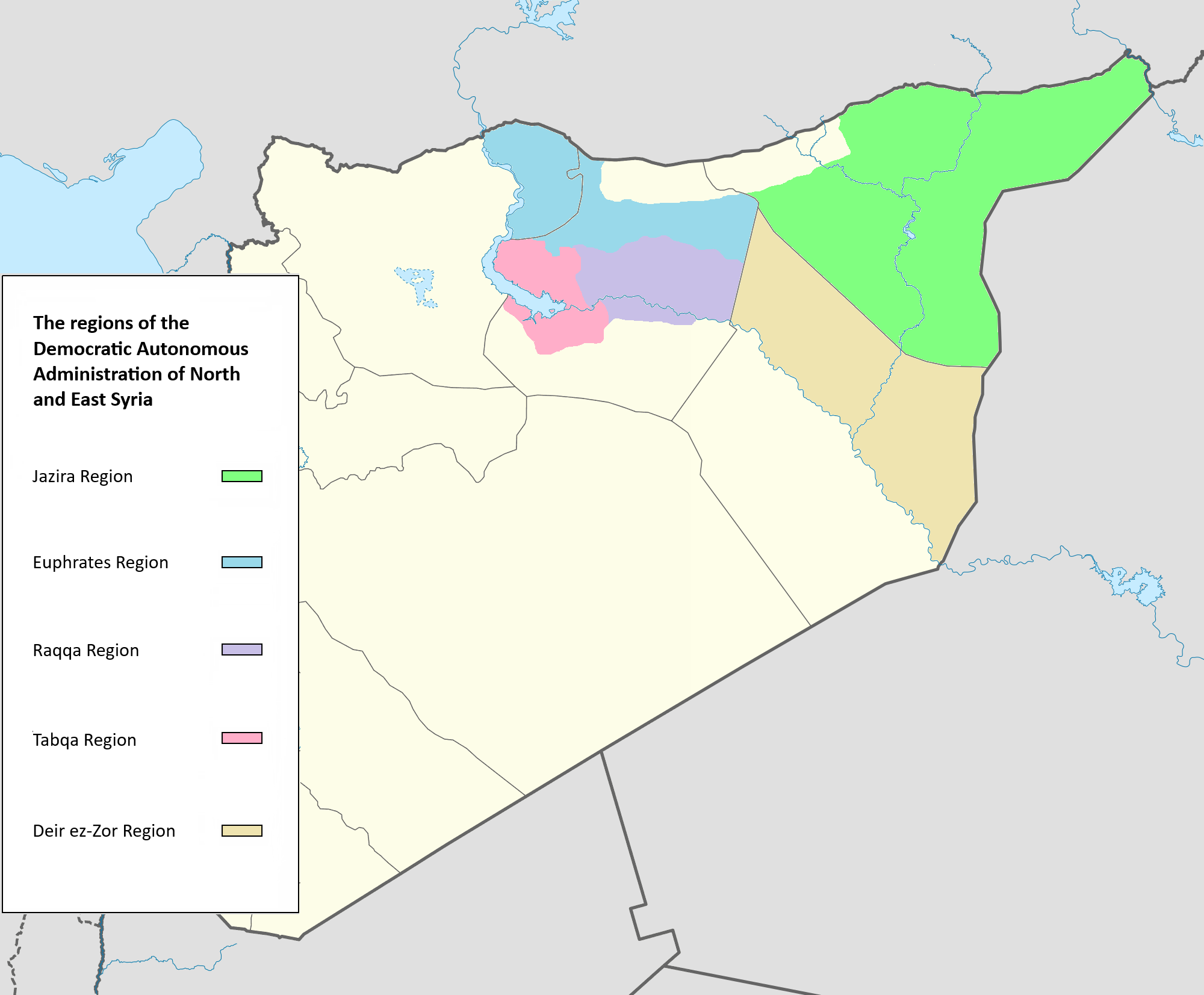
The regions of the Democratic Autonomous Administration of North and East Syria

Proposals for the federalization of Syria were made early during the Syrian Civil War, were implemented in the mostly Kurdish north and east regions of Syria, and a federalized or decentralised structure was called for by groups in several parts of Syria in 2025.

The Rojava conflict led to Kurdish-dominated regions becoming a self-governing federation, Rojava, with a constitution written in 2014, and revised in 2016 and 2023, each time stating that Rojava (Democratic Autonomous Administration of North and East Syria, DAANES, in the 2023 version) was part of the Syrian state. As of 2016, there was little support for federalization outside of Rojava.

Following the late 2024 fall of the Assad regime, Rojava started negotiations with the Syrian transitional government led by Ahmed al-Sharaa on integration of Rojava with the rest of Syrian state structures, with an eight-point agreement signed on 10 March 2025, and continued intentions for a decentralised national structure.

In early August 2025, Druze Sheikh Hikmat al-Hijri and Alawite Sheikh Ghazal Ghazal called for Syrian federalisation. In late August 2025, al-Hijri called for an autonomous Druze region in the Suwayda Governorate in southern Syria and Alawite groups created the Political Council for Central and Western Syria (PCCWS) that explicitly called for a secular, federalised structure for Syria.

== Historical antecedents ==
Map showing the states of the French Mandate from 1921 to 1922

During the French mandate, Syria was subdivided into various autonomous entities, most of which bore the designation "state" (in French État; in Arabic Dawlat):

- the State of the Alawites
- the Province of Jazira
- the Jabal Druze State (originally called the State of Souaida)
- the State of Aleppo
- the State of Damascus
- the State of Greater Lebanon
- the State of Hatay (originally called the Sanjak of Alexandretta)
- the State of Syria

These autonomous entities did not correspond to the administrative division of Ottoman Syria. France ceded Hatay to Turkey in 1939, and Lebanon became an independent state (separate from the rest of Syria) in 1945.

== Proposals during the Syrian Civil War ==
Federalisation was proposed during the Syrian Civil War as a way of ending the war. In the broadest sense, it means turning the centralized Syria into a federal republic with autonomous subdivisions. Many powers and actors involved in the Syrian Civil War have entertained the idea of "federal division", not least among them Russia, United Nations representatives, the United States and Israel. Bashar al-Assad during his rule had publicly rejected the idea of federalism, asserting that the Arab majority in Syria is opposed to such proposals. (Note: Sources:) Most of the neighbouring countries in the region have also dismissed the proposal, including the members of the Arab League and Turkey.

Since federalization could more or less follow ethnic and possibly also religious-sectarian lines, it was dismissed as "division of the country" and "Balkanization" by its opponents. While Assad remained in power, most factions of the Syrian opposition, such as the Syrian National Council and the National Coalition for Syrian Revolutionary and Opposition Forces, consistently rejected the idea of federalization. On the other hand, Kurdish opposition parties strongly promoted the idea. The Egypt-based opposition party Syria's Tomorrow Movement takes an intermediate position.

=== Timeline ===
On 17 March 2016, representatives of the regions of north and east Syria, which had been autonomous cantons since 2014, following the Rojava conflict, declared the region to be a federation of autonomous cantons modelled after the cantons of Switzerland; Afrin Canton, Jazira Canton and Kobanî Canton, as well as the Shahba region. The federation (also called Rojava) is considered by its protagonists to be a model for Syria as a whole. Rojava representatives negotiated successive versions of the region's constitution in 2014, 2016, and 2023, with each version stating that Rojava was part of the Syrian state. The 2023 version named the region's governing system to be the Democratic Autonomous Administration of North and East Syria (DAANES).

In 2016, Rojava's federalisation was dismissed by the Syrian government and disapproved of by Turkey and the United States.

In September 2016, the Secretary-General of the Arab League, Ahmed Aboul Gheit, came out in an interview as one of the first regional politicians taking a public stand for the federalization of Syria. He said that the establishment of a federal system in Syria would "guarantee to preserve the institutions and unity" and that a federal system would be "the most appropriate solution and will protect the country from destruction."

In October 2016, a Russian initiative for federalization with a focus on northern Syria was reported, which at its core called for the existing institutions of the Autonomous Administration of North and East Syria to be recognised by the Syrian government, which rejected the call.

After multilateral peace talks in Astana in January 2017, Russia offered a draft for a future constitution of Syria, which would inter alia turn the "Syrian Arab Republic" into the "Republic of Syria", introduce decentralized authorities as well as elements of federalism like "association areas", strengthen the parliament at the cost of the presidency, and realize secularism by abolishing Islamic jurisprudence as a source of legislation. The same month, United Kingdom Foreign Secretary Boris Johnson said that "implementation of a Dayton style accord in Syria and introduction of some form of a federal solution in Syria (...) may indeed be the right way forward or the only way forward in the end of all this."

Opposition groups proposed a project called "Federal Syria" in 2019. Opposition politician Samir Nashar stated that the project had "received wide support from a broad spectrum of opposition and intellectuals". Nashar argued in November 2025 that federalization was the most realistic model for reorganising Syrian governing structures.

== Post-Assad era ==
=== Pro-federalization ===
==== Northern and eastern Syria ====
Following the late 2024 fall of the Assad regime, Rojava started negotiations with the Syrian transitional government led by Ahmed al-Sharaa, with a first meeting on 31 December 2024. The East Aleppo offensive (2024–2025) led to an eight-point agreement signed on 10 March 2025 between Rojava and the al-Sharaa government, of which the fourth point declared the "integration of all civil and military institutions of North-East Syria into the administration of the Syrian state".

In August 2025, Rojava representatives discussed "democratic integration within a decentralised system for Syria" with US officials and plans for meetings between Rojava and al-Sharaa government representatives continued. On 31 August, Sipan Hemo of the SDF General Command stated his view that the al-Sharaa government "lack[s] the awareness" of what democratic integration would mean. He interpreted the March massacres of Alawites, the southern Syria clashes and the exclusion of DAANES and the Suwayda region from the 2025 Syrian parliamentary election as showing that the al-Sharaa government "lacks a democratic integration mindset" and "monopolize[s] everything without consulting anyone", while the SDF "want[s] to build a democratic Syria that expresses the will of all components, Kurds, Arabs, Syriacs, Armenians, and others, where they can represent themselves".

==== Southern Syria ====
On 8 August 2025, Druze Sheikh Hikmat al-Hijri and Alawite Sheikh Ghazal Ghazal, speaking via video message, addressed the "Unity of Position of the Components of North and East Syria" conference in al-Hasakah, which brought together about 400 representatives from Syria's minority communities. Al-Hijri called for a national project that transcends narrow sectarian and political divisions, while Ghazal advocated a decentralized system ensuring equality, justice, and genuine participation. Their proposals for decentralized or federal governance were strongly rejected by the Syrian government in Damascus.

On 25 August 2025, following the Southern Syria clashes, Hikmat al-Hijri called for autonomy of a Druze region in the Suwayda Governorate, while a Jabal al-Druze spokesperson, Fadi Badriya, stated that the Druze were "demanding independence and separation".

==== Central and western Syria ====
On 27 August 2025, Alawite representatives declared the creation of the Political Council of Central and Western Syria (PCCWS), intended to represent residents of Latakia, Tartus, Homs, and parts of Hama, which called for federalisation of Syria. It referred to the al-Sharaa government as a "terrorist system that seized power at a particular political moment". According to Syrian Observatory for Human Rights (SOHR), the PCCWS calls for secular, human rights based administration including executive, legislative and judicial authorities and calls for referring suspected war crimes and crimes against humanity to the International Criminal Court with the aim of transitional justice.

A protest on 25 November of two hundred protests in Latakia, and another on 28 December 2025 of two thousand protestors, called for federalization. Security forces used gunfire in both protests. Three people were killed and forty wounded in the 28 December protest. In the meantime, Sheikh Ghazal Ghazal, head of the Supreme Alawite Islamic Council, warned of possible internal fighting in Syria and renewed calls for international intervention and a decentralized, federal political system.

=== Anti-federalization ===
==== Syrian transitional government ====
Ahmed al-Sharaa, who leads the Syrian transitional government with its capital in Damascus, sees Decree 107/2011, voted in 2011 by the People's Assembly of Syria, as guaranteeing decentralization of political power structures in Syria. In August 2025, he stated that forms of federalization or decentralization that are "partition" or secession are unacceptable.

== Analysis ==
Researchers Nader al-Khalil and Zaidoun al-Zoubi stated in September 2025 that federalization could be either positive or negative for Syrian "national identity" and "strengthen[ing] citizenship". Al-Khalil stated the effects would "depends on how [federalization] is designed, [how] its boundaries [are] defined, and whether it is anchored in a unifying national project that redefines the state based on equal citizenship and layered sovereignty". Al-Zoubi cited countries where federalization strengthened national identity as including Germany and Spain, and cases where close ties between federalization and ethnicity led to ethnic polarisation, such as Belgium, and led to war in the case of ethnic federalism in Ethiopia. Al-Khalil cited "transparent channels of accountability and resources" as a requirement in linking local and national levels of governance for federalization to "produc[e] equal citizenship".

== See also ==
- Constitution of Syria
- Democratic Autonomous Administration of North and East Syria
- Ethnic groups in Syria
- Regions of Rojava
- Religion in Syria
- Sectarianism and minorities in the Syrian Civil War
- Syrian Democratic Forces
- Syrian peace process
