= Tishrin =

Tishrin (Arabic: تشرين, romanized: tišrīn), also rendered in English as Tishreen, is the Arabic name for the month of October. It may refer to:

- Tishrin, Aleppo
- Tishrin, Hama
- Tishrin Dam
- Tishreen Liberation Day
- 2019–2021 Iraqi protests
- Tishreen (newspaper)
- Tishreen Palace
- Tishreen Park (now known as Umayyad Park)
- Tishreen SC
- Tishreen Stadium
- Tishreen Stadium (al-Hasakah)
- Tishreen University
