= Ghazal Ghazal =

Syrian Alawite Islamic official

Shaykh Ghazal Ghazal
- غزال غزال
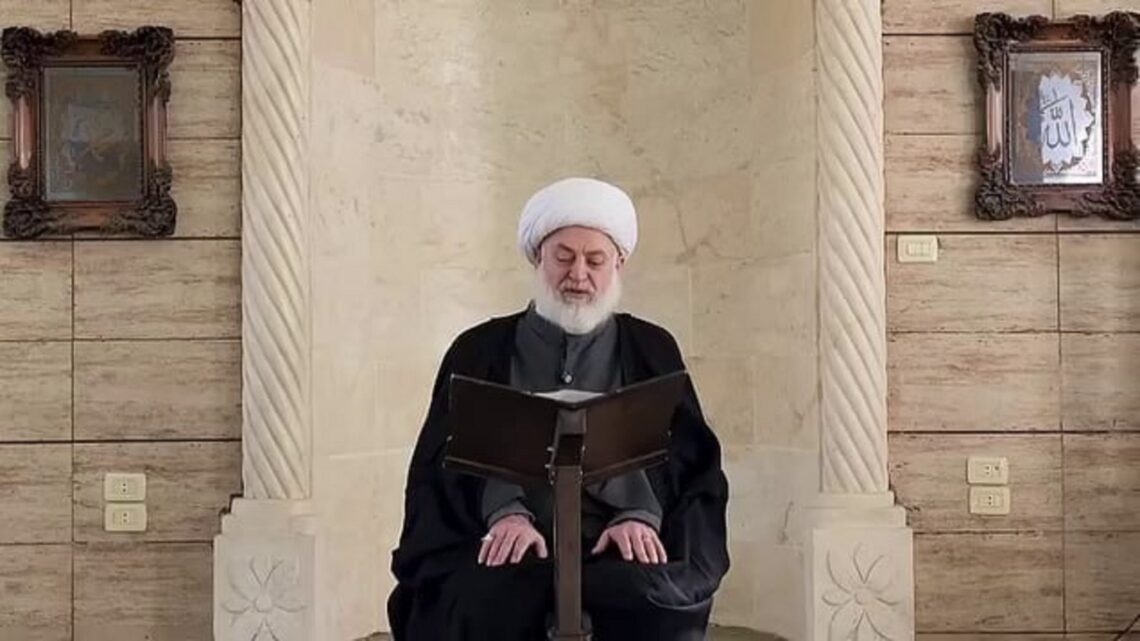
- Shaykh Ghazal Ghazal

Personal life
- Born: 1962 (age 63–64) Tala, Latakia, Syria
- Occupation: Spiritual leader of the Supreme Alawite Islamic Council

Religious life
- Religion: Alawite Islam
- Jurisprudence: Ja'fari

Shaykh Ghazal Wahib Ghazal (Arabic: غزال وهيب غزال, born 1962) is the head of the Supreme Alawite Islamic Council in Syria and abroad. His current whereabouts are unknown.

== Biography ==
Ghazal was born in the village of Tala, in rural Latakia, into a religious family that significantly shaped his upbringing, particularly through the influence of his father, Sheikh Wahib Ghazal. He pursued a traditional path of religious education, progressing through formal Islamic studies. In 2004, he assumed the duties of mufti of Latakia, a position that, over time, conferred upon him increasing religious legitimacy and public authority within the governorate. In February 2025, he was elected president of the Supreme Alawite Islamic Council in Syria and the Diaspora.

Following the 2025 massacres of Syrian Alawites and massacres of Syrian Druze, which left up to 2,500 civilians dead, figures such as Ghazal gained increased prominence, with the violence frequently cited as a cautionary example for communities in northeast Syria against allowing Damascus to reassert control over their areas. On 8 August 2025, Ghazal, speaking via video message, called for a decentralized, federalist Syria during the "Unity of Position of the Components of North and East Syria" conference in al-Hasakah which aimed at strengthening inter-communal partnership between Alawites, Druze, Kurds, and other representatives, a proposal that was rejected by the Syrian government.

Amid reports that Alawites were being targeted by Syria’s new Sunni Islamist rulers within the transitional government, Ghazal later called for peaceful protests in November 2025; these demonstrations were met with live fire by security forces. He released a statement in November condemning the continued sectarian killing, stating Alawites had given up their weapons out of faith in the state, only to find themselves ruled by a takfiri regime. He added that there was no existential war between Alawites and Sunnis. Ghazal called for a general strike against the "oppressive regime" during the first anniversary for the fall of the Assad government.

In late December 2025, Ghazal called for peaceful protests in response to the mosque bombing and what he described as ongoing targeted violence against the Alawite community, urging demonstrations to demand protection and accountability while rejecting sectarian violence. On 9 February 2026, Ghazal reaffirmed his commitment to justice and the protection of all communities, condemning violence and sectarian targeting, and emphasizing that true stability in Syria requires accountability, power-sharing, and respect for the rights of all citizens, while rejecting superficial reconciliations.
