= Arzah =

Arzah أرزة الضبعة Arzah
- Village
- Location in Syria
- Coordinates: 35°10′28″N 36°41′51″E
- Country: Syria
- Governorate: Hama
- District: Hama
- Subdistrict: Hama

Population (2004)
  - Total: 1,280
- Time zone: UTC+3 (EEST)
- City Qrya Pcode: C2962

Arzah (Arabic: أرزة); also spelled Arze or Arzeh; also known as al-Arzah al-Dabaa (Arabic: أرزة الضبعة)

is a Syrian village located in the Subdistrict of the Hama District in the Hama Governorate. According to the Syria Central Bureau of Statistics (CBS), Arzah had a population of 1,280 in the 2004 census. Its inhabitants were predominantly Alawites.

10–12 Arzah villagers were killed in a sectarian massacre in February 2025 by Saraya Ansar al-Sunnah.

The village was subjected to another massacre in March 2025. As a result of this massacre, the native Alawite population of the village was expelled, and it has now been settled by Sunnis from the nearby town of Khattab.
