= Samir Nashar =

Syrian politician

Samir Nashar is a Syrian politician. Nashar co-founded small opposition groups in 2005 and was a member of the Syrian National Council in the early 2010s. He was detained for two days in 2006.

== Youth and education ==
Nashar was born in 1945 or 1946 (age 79–80). He graduated in commerce at the University of Aleppo in 1969.

== Political activities ==
During his university studies in the late 1960s, Nashar joined the Arab Socialist Movement. He left the party after one of its splits into pro and anti Hafez al-Assad factions.

After a speech by Bashar al-Assad in 2000 in favour of democracy, Nashar started coordinating political discussions. He signed the Damascus Declaration in 2005. In 2005, Nashar was a co-founder of a small group called the Alliance of Free Nationalists. He was the spokesman for the Syrian Free National Party, another small opposition group created in 2005. He was also a member of the Committee for Reviving the Civil Society. He was described by Newsweek in 2005 as "a dream democrat ... liberal, secular, rich–and brazenly outspoken". In 2007, Nashar tried to form a movement of elites in Aleppo, called the Free Patriotic Movement. The group became inactive as a result of pressure from the security forces.

Nashar was a member of the Syrian National Council during the early 2010s.

In November 2025, during the Syrian transitional government that followed the fall of the Assad regime, Nashar argued that federalization was the most realistic model for reorganising Syrian governing structures.

== Arrests ==
In 2003, during the Presidency of Bashar al-Assad, Nashar was arrested along with other political activists. He was later released. On 25 March 2006, Nashar was arrested by Syrian authorities in Aleppo by agents of the military secret service after he returned from a meeting of exiled opposition figures in Washington, D.C. On 26 March the Syrian Human Rights Organisation called for his immediate release. He was released from custody on 27 March.
