= Al-Mukhtariya =

Al-Mukhtariya المختارية (الحفة)
- Village
- Location within Syria
- Coordinates: 35°34′54″N 35°56′22″E
- Country: Syria
- Governorate: Latakia
- District: Al-Haffah
- Subdistrict: Al-Haffah
- Time zone: UTC+2 (EET)
  - Summer (DST): UTC+3 (EEST)

Al-Mukhtariya is a small town in the Latakia Governorate of Syria, primarily inhabited by members of the Alawite community. Historically, Latakia and its surrounding areas have been a stronghold for the Alawite minority, which includes the family of former Syrian President Bashar al-Assad. The region has been central to various conflicts in Syria due to its strategic and symbolic importance.

During the Syrian Civil War and its aftermath, Al-Mukhtariya became a site of significant military and political activity. In recent years, particularly after the fall of the Assad regime in December 2024, the town has witnessed heightened tensions and violence. On 7 March 2025, it was one of the locations where mass executions of Alawite men occurred during clashes between the transitional government forces and pro-Assad loyalists. These events highlight the ongoing instability and sectarian challenges in post-Assad Syria.
