= Secularism in Syria =

A process of secularization in Syria occurred under the French mandate in the 1920s. Syria has been governed by the Arab Socialist Ba'ath Party from 8 March 1963 up until 8 December 2024. The Ba'athist regime combined Arab socialism with elements of the secular ideology along with an authoritarian political system which also incorporated aspects of Islamic law, with different court systems operating for religious minorities. Non-Muslims are forbidden from the role of head of state.

== Secularism in the Syrian constitution ==
Article 3 of the Syrian Constitution of 1930 required that the President be of Muslim faith. The Syrian Constitution of 1973 made Islam the state religion. The third article ruled that:

(1) The religion of the President of the Republic has to be Islam. (2) Islamic jurisprudence is a main source of legislation.

However, Article 35 guarantees religious freedom for every recognized religious communities:

(1) The freedom of faith is guaranteed. The state respects all religions. (2) The state guarantees the freedom to hold any religious rites, provided they do not disturb the public order.

After the Syrian revolution began, the Constitution was amended in 2012. Article 3 now read:

The religion of the President of the Republic is Islam; Islamic jurisprudence shall be a major source of legislation; The State shall respect all religions, and ensure the freedom to perform all the rituals that do not prejudice public order; The personal status of religious communities shall be protected and respected.

Personal status law is still based on Sharia and applied by Sharia Courts. Syria has a dual legal system which includes both secular and religious courts. Civil and criminal cases are heard in secular courts, while the Sharia courts handle personal, family, and religious matters in cases between Muslims or between Muslims and non-Muslims. Non-Muslim communities have their own religious courts using their own religious law.

=== Proposed constitutional changes ===
After Russian-brokered peace talks between Syrian civil war parties in Astana in January 2017, Russia offered a draft for a future constitution of Syria, which would inter alia turn the "Syrian Arab Republic" into the "Republic of Syria", introduce decentralized authorities as well as elements of federalism like "association areas", strengthen the parliament at the cost of the presidency, and realize secularism by abolishing Islamic jurisprudence as a source of legislation.

== Democratic Federation of Northern Syria ==
In the de facto autonomous Democratic Federation of Northern Syria, secularism was introduced, including civil law in personal status, proclaiming absolute equality of women under the law and a ban on forced marriage as well as polygamy, while underage marriage was outlawed as well. For the first time in Syrian history, civil marriage is being allowed and promoted.
