= 2025 Homs mosque bombing =

- Location of the bombing in Wadi Al-Dhabab
- Location: 34°42′9″N 36°43′39″E; Imam Ali ibn Abi Talib Mosque, Homs, Syria
- Date: 26 December 2025 c. 12:30 p.m. (UTC+03:00)
- Attack type: IED detonation
- Deaths: 8
- Injuries: 18
- Perpetrators: Saraya Ansar al-Sunnah (claimed responsibility); One other group (per Saraya Ansar al-Sunnah); Possible Islamic State involvement (per Syrian Ministry of Interior)
- Motive: Anti-Alawism (per SAIC)

On 26 December 2025, a bombing occurred in the Alawite-majority Imam Ali ibn Abi Talib mosque in Homs, Syria during Friday prayers. The explosion killed eight people and left eighteen more injured. The Islamist militant group, Saraya Ansar al-Sunnah claimed responsibility for the attack via a statement on Telegram.

== Background ==
Following the fall of the Assad regime, the city of Homs experienced a deterioration in security and a resurgence of sectarian tensions. According to the Syrian Observatory for Human Rights (SOHR), multiple episodes of communal violence were recorded in Homs and surrounding areas during the post-Assad period, including attacks on and retaliatory killings of Alawite civilians amid broader unrest between different sectarian groups, contributing to a volatile security situation in the city.

== Bombing ==
The bombing occurred in Ali ibn Abi Talib Mosque in the Wadi al-Dahab neighborhood, an Alawite-majority neighborhood, during Friday prayer. An eyewitness told Al Jazeera Arabic that the explosion occurred between the times of Adhan and Iqama, and that the explosion felt like it came from the western side of the mosque.

Eight fatalities and 18 injuries were reported as a result of the attack.

== Perpetrators ==
Saraya Ansar al-Sunnah, an extremist Islamist terrorist group, claimed responsibility for the attack in a statement on Telegram, saying that it detonated several explosive devices inside the mosque in coordination with members of another organization, warning that its operations "will continue to escalate". The group was formed shortly after the fall of the Assad regime in December 2024 and had previously carried out a suicide bombing inside a church in Damascus in June 2025.

The Syrian Ministry of Interior told Al Arabiya that the Islamic State might be involved in the attack, noting that the assailant had placed a bomb-laden bag inside the mosque.

On 12 January 2026, the Ministry of Interior announced the arrest of Ahmed Attallah Al-Diab and Anas Al-Zarrad, accusing them of involvement in the bombing.

== Reactions ==
=== Domestic ===
Syrian authorities, including the Syrian Ministry of Foreign Affairs, Ministry of Endowments, Ministry of Interior, Ministry of Justice, and Ministry of Information, condemned the attack as a cowardly terrorist act targeting places of worship and national unity, reaffirmed Syria's rejection of terrorism, pledged to bring the perpetrators to justice, and extended condolences to the victims' families while wishing the injured a speedy recovery.

The Supreme Alawite Islamic Council condemned the attack, describing it as part of a broader campaign of violence and incitement against Alawites.

The Democratic Autonomous Administration of North and East Syria condemned the bombing as a terrorist crime aimed at spreading chaos and destabilizing society and expressed solidarity with the victims.

=== International ===
The attack drew widespread international condemnation. Bahrain, France, Iraq, Jordan, Kuwait, Lebanon, Palestine, Qatar, Saudi Arabia, Turkey, and the United Arab Emirates condemned the bombing as an act of terrorism and expressed solidarity with Syria and condolences to the victims' families.

The Arab League, the Gulf Cooperation Council, and the Muslim World League condemned the attack, reaffirming their rejection of terrorism and warning against attempts to destabilize Syria.

The United Nations condemned the attack, stating that attacks on civilians and places of worship are unacceptable and that those responsible must be brought to justice.

== Aftermath ==
Demonstrations were held by the Alawite community in Tartus and Latakia on 28 December in protest against the attack. The protests were called for by Alawite Sheikh Ghazal Ghazal of the Supreme Alawite Islamic Council, drew thousands of participants calling for greater protection and political reforms. In Latakia, cars belonging to security forces were set on fire and clashes between protesters and security forces resulted in two deaths, while in Tartus a hand grenade was thrown at a police station, injuring two members of the security forces during the unrest.
