= Al-Zurzuriyah =

Al-Zurzuriyah الزرزورية
- Village
- Location in Syria
- Coordinates: 34°43′50″N 36°38′18″E
- Country: Syria
- Governorate: Homs
- District: Homs
- Subdistrict: Khirbet Tin Nur

Population (2004)
  - Total: 1,117
- Time zone: UTC+2 (EET)
  - Summer (DST): +3

Al-Zurzuriyah (Arabic: الزرزورية) is a village in northern Syria located west of Homs in the Homs Governorate. According to the Syria Central Bureau of Statistics, al-Zurzuriyah had a population of 1,117 in the 2004 census. Its inhabitants are predominantly Shia Muslims.
