= Maggie Michael =

American painter (born 1974)

Maggie Michael (born 1974) is an American painter. Born in Milwaukee, Michael has spent much of her career in Washington, D.C. A 1996 graduate of the University of Wisconsin-Milwaukee, from which she received a BFA, with honors, she received her MA from San Francisco State University in 2000 and her MFA from American University in 2002. She has received numerous awards during her career, including a grant from the Joan Mitchell Foundation in 2004, the same year in which she was given a Young Artist Grant by the D.C. Commission on the Arts and Humanities; she has also worked with the Hirshhorn Museum and Sculpture Garden. Michael is married to the sculptor Dan Steinhilber. She has served on the faculty of the Corcoran College of Art and Design.

== Work ==
Stylistically, Michael's work is derived in part from Pop Art and in part from Abstract Expressionism. Her 2003 painting Genie is currently in the collection of the Hirshhorn Museum and Sculpture Garden, while her 2005 painting Anchor, in latex, ink, oil enamel, and spray paint on canvas, is owned by the Smithsonian American Art Museum. The same museum received her 2004 painting Crest, formerly in the collection of the Corcoran Gallery of Art, when that institution's collection was disbursed after its closing. Another painting from the same museum, Untitled (Helmet) of 2006, was transferred to the National Museum of Women in the Arts. Her work has been also shown at the American University Museum .

"Michael paints in series, such as the recent “Perfect X,” that are characterized more by visual motifs than different techniques. Nearly all of her pictures contrast hard-edged shapes, sometimes stenciled, with looser gestures, and employ a variety of pigments, including ink, acrylic, latex and spray paint. These liquids and more flow through the American University Museum's “A Phrase Hung in Midair as If Frozen,” which surveys Michael's output since 2002, the year she earned an MFA at AU."

Michael seeks to emphasize paint’s fluidity, by apply paint pigment so thickly that it becomes sculptural. This is can be seen through one of her earliest pieces, the “Clones”. She uses single-color pools of latex paint were poured onto panels, then shaped into near-identical blobs. The Washington Post calls her work, "playful yet spartan, with an austerity not evident in the other pictures, even quiet recent ones".

Her work is included in the collection of the Smithsonian American Art Museum.

== Awards ==
- Artist at Work Program, Hirshhorn Museum and Sculpture Garden, 2006-2007
- Joan Mitchell Foundation Painters & Sculptors Grant Artist Fellowship, D.C. Commission on the Arts and Humanities, An agency supported in part by the National Endowment for the Arts, 2004
- Young Artist Grant, D.C. Commission on the Arts and Humanities, an agency supported in part by the National Endowment for the Arts, 2004

== Exhibitions ==
2006

- Ambrosino Gallery, Conversations (curated by Sharon Louden), Miami, FL
- Street Scenes: Art not Ads, mobile truck project in Washington, DC, curated by Welmoed Lanstra and Nora Helpren
- Corcoran Gallery of Art, Redefined: Modern and Contemporary Art from the Collection, Washington, DC
- Hirshhorn Museum and Sculpture Garden, New Acquisitions, Washington, DC
- Wichita Falls Art Museum, Take Me to the River, Wichita Falls, TX
- G Fine Art, Open End, Washington, DC (solo)

2005

- Lump Gallery/Projects, Worse for the Better, Raleigh, NC (solo)
- Rule, (T)rain, Denver, CO (solo)
- Branch Gallery, Two for the See-Saw (curated by Bill Thelen), Carrboro, NC
- G Fine Art, Blasts (curated by Paul Brewer), Washington, DC
- Arlington Arts Center, State of The Art (curated by Stephen Phillips), Arlington, VA
- Gallery Four, I Want to See, Baltimore, MD
- OmniArt, Art Basel Miami Beach, Miami, FL

2004

- G Fine Art, Run, Washington, DC (solo)
- Scope Art Fair, New York, NY (solo)
- Kimberly Venardos, Selections, New York, NY
- Julie Baker Fine Art, Spring, Grass Valley, CA
- G Fine Art, Washington, DC

2003

- Corcoran Gallery of Art, Census (curated by Paul Brewer), Washington, DC
- G Fine Art, Drawing, Washington, DC
- Kimberly Venardos, Maggie Michael, Dan Steinhilber, New York, NY

2002

- Decatur Blue, DB Sides, Washington, DC
- G Fine Art, Nine Painters, Washington, DC
- G Fine Art, Summer 2002, Washington, DC
- Julie Baker Fine Art, Baker©'s Dozen, Grass Valley, CA
- G Fine Art, Clones, Washington, DC (solo)

2001

- Anton Gallery, Washington, DC
- Gross McCleaf Gallery, Philadelphia, PA
- I Street Studios Gallery, Washington, DC

2000

- Studio 7/Warehouse, Art Romp, Washington, DC
