= Tuwaym =

Tuwaym التويم
- Village
- Location in Syria
- Coordinates: 35°9′42″N 36°32′20″E
- Country: Syria
- Governorate: Hama
- District: Hama
- Subdistrict: Hama

Population (2004)
  - Total: 1,428
- Time zone: UTC+3 (AST)
- City Qrya Pcode: C6308

Tuwaym (Arabic: التويم, romanized: al-Tuwaym: also transliterated Tuweim) is a village in central Syria, administratively part of the Hama Governorate. According to the Syria Central Bureau of Statistics (CBS), Tuwaym had a population of 1,428 in the 2004 census. Its inhabitants are predominantly Alawites.

== History ==
In an Ottoman court record from 1818, Tuwaym was listed as a village of the Hama Sanjak, consisting of 8 feddans and paying 660 qirsh in taxes. In 1838, Tuwaym was recorded as a Sunni Muslim village. In the late 19th or early 20th centuries, the inhabitants sold all or most of their lands to the urban notables of Hama. In the early 1930s, the inhabitants were Alawite tenant farmers and the lands were mostly owned by different notable families of Hama.

== Bibliography ==
- Comité de l'Asie française (April 1933). "Notes sur la propriété foncière dans le Syrie centrale (Notes on Landownership in Central Syria)". Bulletin du Comité de l'Asie française (in French). 33 (309). Comité de l'Asie française: 130–136.
- Douwes, Dick (2000). The Ottomans in Syria: A History of Justice and Oppression. I.B. Tauris. ISBN 1860640311.
- Robinson, E.; Smith, E. (1841). Biblical Researches in Palestine, Mount Sinai and Arabia Petraea: A Journal of Travels in the year 1838. Vol. 3. Boston: Crocker & Brewster.
