= Saraya Ansar al-Sunnah =

Syrian militant group

- سرايا أنصار السنة
- Founding leader: Abu Aisha al-Shami
- Founded: 1 February 2025; 20 months ago
- Country: Lebanon; Syria
- Headquarters: Western Syria
- Active regions: Western Syria; Tripoli, Lebanon
- Ideology: Salafi jihadism; Anti-Assadism; Anti-Syrian government; Anti-Shi'ism; Anti-Alawism; Anti-Druzism; Anti-Christian
- Size: 1,600
- Wars: Syrian conflict (2024–present); Western Syria clashes; March 2025 Western Syria clashes

Saraya Ansar al-Sunnah (Arabic: سرايا أنصار السنة, lit. 'Supporters of the Sunnah Companies') is a Sunni Islamist militant organization operating in Syria and Lebanon, described as anti-Shia, anti-Alawite, anti-Druze, and anti-Christian. Its stated goal is to establish an Islamic State in Syria that excludes Alawites, Druze, Christians, and Shia.

== History ==
The group was created on 1 February 2025 in Syria by Abu Aisha al-Shami, who had left Hay'at Tahrir al-Sham (HTS) after perceiving it to be lenient towards Shia Muslims and Alawites. The same day, it claimed responsibility for an attack that killed 12 Alawites in Arzah, and its fighters attacked Tell Dahab and killed five former security members of the Ba'athist government. They also claimed responsibility for the killing of 10 Shia villagers in Hama. The religious advisors of the militant group include Abu al-Fath al-Shami and Abu Sufyan al-Dimashqi, both being high ranking officials.

The group stated that its sole motive was to continue the attacks until Shia Muslims and Alawites were fully "eliminated" from Syria or displaced to other countries. The group is decentralized with no formal headquarters. The group opposes the transitional government's efforts to pardon former members of the Ba'athist government.

On 5 March 2025, Saraya Ansar al-Sunnah claimed to have set fires to forests in Qardaha, warning that it would target Alawites for crimes committed by the Ba'athist government. According to the Institute for the Study of War, "It is not clear whether the group is conducting these attacks itself or if it is falsely claiming security incidents."

On 4 April 2025, Saraya Ansar al-Sunnah claimed to have killed an Alawite man and his relative in Safita, Tartus Governorate. A day later the group claimed an attack which killed a former National Defence Forces member in Homs Governorate, as well as kidnapping three Alawites from Sqoubin, Latakia Governorate in a separate attack.

On 8 April 2025, Saraya Ansar al-Sunnah claimed that one of its members drove up to an Alawite civilian and shot him in the majority Alawite neighborhood of Wadi al Dahab in Homs, the group justified the attacks by claiming that the person was a "criminal" and affiliated with the former Ba'athist Government.

On 9 April 2025 it stated that it killed 20 Alawites over the past week, with the Institute for the Study of War comparing its rhetoric to the "ideology of al-Qaeda and ISIS".

On 9 May, Saraya Ansar al-Sunnah assassinated a former National Defense Forces commander in the al-Waer neighborhood of Homs City. The slain commander was known for his efforts to organize a military defense of Homs City against HTS before the fall of the Assad regime in December 2024. In a separate attack, Saraya Ansar al-Sunnah also assassinated a Shia Assad regime fighter for his association with Liwa al-Quds in the al-Mashad neighborhood of Aleppo city.

On 10 May, it published a statement declaring itself to be active in the city of Tripoli, Lebanon, threatening to "strike the apostates among the Nusayris, the Rawafid, and the Druze" there.

On 21 May, the newspaper An-Nahar published an interview with the head of Saraya Ansar al-Sunnah's Sharia division Abu al-Fath al-Shami, who stated that the militant organisation was founded in secret in Idlib prior to the fall of the previous Syrian government. According to him, the organisation came out of secrecy in order to publicly distance themselves from the regime of Ahmed al-Sharaa, who he described as an untrustworthy tyrant. He also stated that the organisation contained members who had defected from HTS, along with defectors from other militias and civilians who had joined the group. Describing the organisation's priorities, he stated that they do not currently see a need to confront the Syrian transitional regime's military forces, despite having declared them to be apostates. According to him, the organisation is presently focused on attacking Alawites, Druze, Shiites, and the SDF forces in Northeast Syria.

On 10 June 2025, Saraya Ansar al-Sunnah claimed responsibility for killing a former Assad Regime member and injuring another in Dijabijja, Homs Governorate and killed an Alawite man in Tartus.

On 22 June 2025, at least one attacker opened fire and detonated an explosive device inside the Greek Orthodox Mar Elias Church as people were praying in Damascus, Syria, killing at least 25 people and injuring 63 others. The Syrian Ministry of Interior said the Islamic State was responsible for the attack, while Saraya Ansar al-Sunnah claimed responsibility for the attack.

On 12 July 2025, wildfires broke out in Latakia which were purposefully set by Saraya Ansar al-Sunnah who took responsibility for it though Syria's leader of the Ministry of Interior, Anas Khattab, claimed there was no evidence of arson even as forces investigate. The wild fires started a day prior and also spread to Idlib, the targets of arson are rugged mountains and dozens of teams have worked to stop these fires.

During the Southern Syria clashes in July, the organisation said that it would expand its sectarian attacks to include the Druze community in Suwayda.

The group claimed responsibility for the Imam Ali Mosque attack, which took place in December 2025.

In 2026, according to a United Nations report, Saraya Ansar al-Sunnah attempted to assassinate Syrian president Ahmed al-Sharaa, Interior Minister Anas Hasan Khattab, and Foreign Minister Asaad al-Shaibani in areas of northern Aleppo and Daraa. The report stated that these assassination attempts were done by Islamic State operatives under the cover of Saraya Ansar al-Sunnah and with the support of Saraya Ansar al-Sunnah.

== Ideology ==
Its stated goal is to establish an Islamic state in Syria that excludes Alawites, Druze, Christians, and Shia through lone wolf attacks.

== Relations with ISIS ==
According to the Institute for the Study of War, the group "appears to support IS and share its extremist ideology." Though the group has denied that it cooperates with ISIS, it has stated that cooperation with it "may happen in the future and will be announced as it happens." Abu al-Fath al-Shami, head of Saraya Ansar al-Sunnah's Sharia division, stated that the organisation has not pledged allegiance to ISIS's leader and is not affiliated with him, but added that "whoever agrees with us in pure monotheism and sincere jihad has our brotherhood."
