= Barmiya =

Barmiya بارمايا
- Village
- Location within Syria
- Coordinates: 35°10′55″N 35°59′25″E
- Country: Syria
- Governorate: Tartus
- District: Baniyas
- Subdistrict: Baniyas

Population (2004)
  - Total: 1,997
- Time zone: UTC+2 (EET)
  - Summer (DST): UTC+3 (EEST)

Barmiya (Arabic: بارمايا; also transliterated Barmaya) is a village in northwestern Syria, administratively part of the Baniyas District of the Tartus Governorate, located east of Baniyas. According to the Syria Central Bureau of Statistics, Barmiya had a population of 1,997 in the 2004 census. Its inhabitants are predominantly Alawites.

== Sources ==
- Balanche, Fabrice (2000). "Les Alaouites, l'espace et le pouvoir dans la région côtière syrienne : une intégration nationale ambiguë" (in French). Tours: Université François Rabelais.
