= Mar Elias Church attack =

2025 terrorist attack in Damascus, Syria

Saint Elijah (Mar Elias) Church attack
- Part of the aftermath of the Syrian civil war
- Location: 33.5032°N 36.3199°E; Mar Elias Church, Dweilaa, Damascus, Syria
- Date: 22 June 2025
- Target: Church attendees
- Attack type: Suicide bombing, shooting
- Weapons: Suicide vest, firearm
- Deaths: 31 (including the perpetrator)
- Injuries: 54
- Perpetrators: Islamic State (alleged); Saraya Ansar al-Sunnah (claimant) (alleged to be allied with the Islamic State)
- Assailant: Muhammad Zain al-Abidin Abu Uthman

On 22 June 2025, at least one attacker opened fire and detonated an explosive device inside the Greek Orthodox Mar Elias Church during Divine Liturgy in Damascus, Syria, killing at least 30 people and injuring 54 others.

The Syrian Ministry of Interior said the Islamic State was responsible for the suicide attack, while Saraya Ansar al-Sunnah claimed responsibility.

== Background ==
The attack was the first suicide bombing in Damascus since the fall of the Assad regime in December 2024. The new Islamist government, in an attempt to win over minorities and maintain control against terrorist sleeper cells, had tried to shore up order by aligning with rebel factions and arming neighborhood watch groups.

Christians have been increasingly concerned that weapons are being freely carried around. The attack came after Muslim sheikhs visited Damascus neighborhoods asking Christian residents to convert to Islam and to stop consuming alcohol, and after killings elsewhere in March and May. The Islamic State has been responsible for many unsuccessful attacks on churches in post-Assad Syria, they massacred the Shiite minority in Sayyidah Zaynab in 2016, and despite its 2019 defeat in Syria, has still carried out several attacks and taken advantage of security weaknesses. According to Syrian Interior Ministry spokesman Noureddine al-Baba and Information Minister Hamza Mostafa, the Islamic State and the previous government want to destabilize Syria and attack its civic values.

== Attack ==
On 22 June 2025, on the Synaxis of All Saints of Antioch, an attacker entered the Mar Elias Church in Dweilaa, Damascus, Syria, and began shooting at the 350 people attending the Divine Liturgy, detonating an explosive vest at the entrance as the crowd tried to push him out. At some point, the attacker threw a grenade, according to Moussa Al-Khoury, Bishop of Darayya. The explosion caused much damage, breaking glass, destroying pews, collapsing the iconostasis, scattering bodies and splattering blood on the walls, floor and icons.

A church priest reported the presence of a second gunman, while another witness saw two accomplices that fled before the attack began.

== Perpetrators ==
According to the Syrian Ministry of Interior, the Islamic State was responsible. In addition, the ministry claimed that the terrorists who attacked the church came from al-Hawl refugee camp.

No group initially claimed responsibility for the attack. A few days later, Saraya Ansar al-Sunnah claimed responsibility for the attack via their Telegram channel, and identified the attacker as Muhammad Zain al-Abidin Abu Uthman. In the meantime, the Syrian Observatory for Human Rights reported that an injured attacker was taken to al-Mujtahid Hospital, where it was later discovered that he was affiliated with the Syrian Ministry of Defense and a native of Deir ez-Zor Governorate.

== Aftermath ==
State media reported at least 25 people were killed and 63 others were injured, many seriously. Local media said children were among the casualties. Our Sunday Visitor later reported 30 parishioners were killed and 54 others were injured.

On 23 June, Syria's interior ministry arrested an unspecified number of suspects near Damascus. Explosives and a booby-trapped motorcycle were also seized. A day later, the interior ministry announced a series of raids targeting extremist hideouts in Rif Dimashq, resulting in the capture of collaborators and logistics personnel identified through surveillance footage from the area. On 24 June, a memorial service was held for nine of the victims at the Holy Cross Church in Damascus. Patriarch John X spoke at the memorial service.

On 16 July 2026, Deputy Interior Minister Maj. Gen. Abdul Qader Tahan said ISIL carried out the attack to incite sectarian tensions and undermine the government, adding that authorities had foiled a planned attack on the Sayyida Zainab shrine, arrested around 1,300 suspected ISIL members, and dismantled 34 cells.

== Reactions ==
=== Domestic ===
Information minister Hamza al-Mustafa condemned the attack, calling it a targeted terrorist attack.

The Democratic Autonomous Administration of North and East Syria condemned the attack, calling it a "despicable form of terrorism," and expressed condolences to the victims.

The Greek Orthodox Patriarchate of Antioch released a statement saying "The treacherous hand of evil struck this evening, claiming our lives, along with the lives of our loved ones who fell today as martyrs during the evening divine liturgy." Patriarch John X, speaking at the memorial service in Damascus, stated that the attack was a massacre, a heinous crime, and a targeting of a fundamental component of Syria. He asserted that Syrian Christians were not going anywhere after the attack. Speaking to the current president of Syria Ahmed al-Sharaa, the Patriarch regretted that there were no government officials at the crime scene other than Hind Kabawat, the only Christian in government. He appealed for the government to extend a hand to the Syrian Christian population in building the new Syria. He also said that this attack was the first of its kind in Syria since 1860.

President al-Sharaa pledged a full security mobilization to bring the attackers to justice, stressing the need for national unity in defending the country's security and stability.

Residents of Damascus condemned the attack and called for peace and protection.

=== International ===
United Nations special envoy Geir Otto Pedersen condemned the attack, calling it a heinous crime and an act of terrorism. The Arab League also condemned the attack. Pope Leo XIV offered his condolences.

The attack drew condemnations and condolences from other countries and groups including Turkey, Palestine, France, Oman, Egypt, the UAE, Lebanon, Greece, Cyprus, Georgia, Ukraine, the Netherlands, the Czech Republic, Belgium, Austria, Kuwait, Saudi Arabia, Bahrain, Qatar, Jordan, Iraq, Yemen, and Israel.
