= Homs school bombing =

2014 terrorist attack in Syria

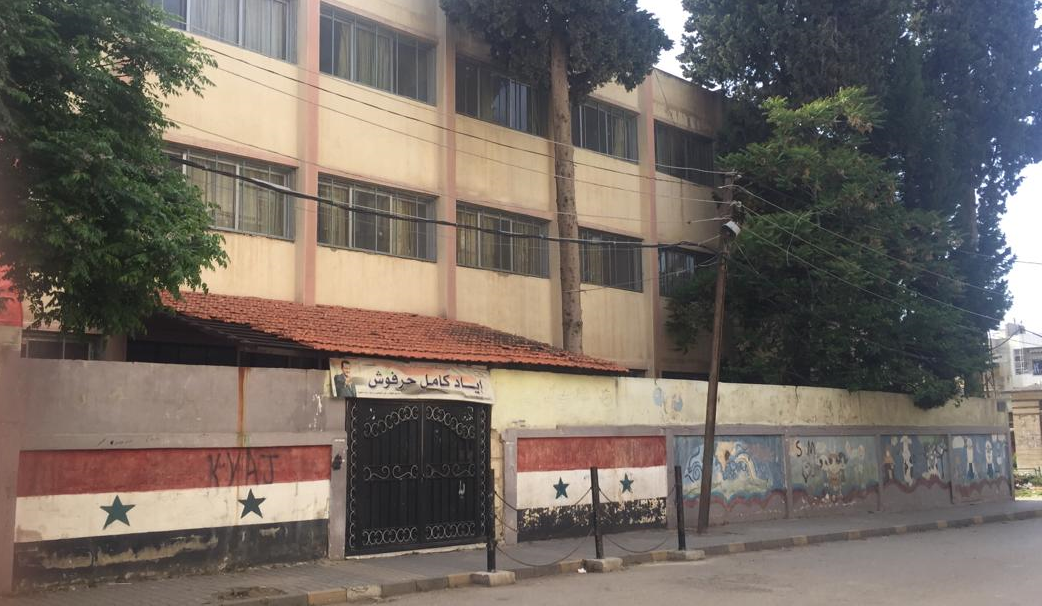
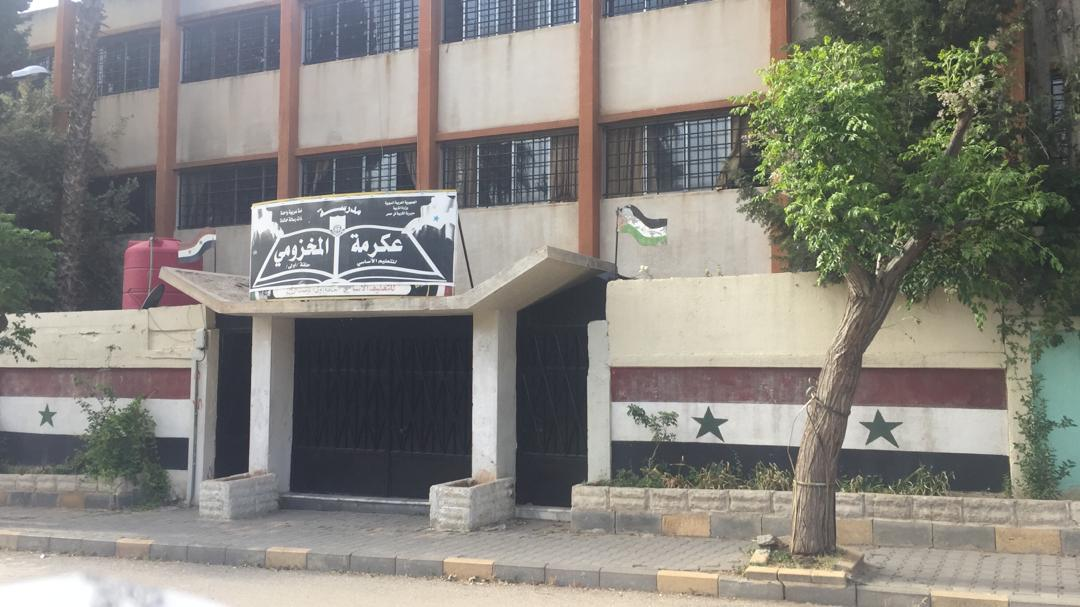
- The attacker detonated an IED in front of the school (left), then blew himself up at the gate of another school (right).
- Location: 34°42′40″N 36°42′51″E; Akrama al-Makhzumi, Homs, Syria
- Date: 1 October 2014; ~12:00 (UTC+02:00)
- Target: Akrama al-Makhzumi elementary school
- Attack type: IED, suicide bomber
- Deaths: 54
- Motive: Sectarian

The Homs school bombing occurred on 1 October 2014 in Homs, Syria in an Alawite-majority neighborhood during the Syrian civil war. The attack targeted two neighboring elementary schools and resulted in 54 deaths, including 47 children, three members of the security forces, and four adult civilians.

== Background ==
During the Siege of Homs, the city became divided between opposition- and government-controlled areas. Several government-held neighborhoods, including Akrama, Al-Zahra, Al-Nuzha, and Wadi al-Dhahab, were predominantly associated with Alawite and pro-government communities. Human Rights Watch documented numerous mortar attacks, car bombings, and other explosions targeting government-controlled areas of Homs. HRW reported that many of these attacks originated from opposition-held areas and lacked apparent military targets; Jabhat al-Nusra later claimed responsibility for several bombings in the city.

On 2 December 2012, a car bomb exploded in the government-held Hamra district of Homs, killing at least 15 people and injuring 24 others. On 8 June 2013, a suicide car bombing struck the Al-Adawiya district, killing seven people and injuring ten others. A month later, on 8 July, twin car bombs exploded on Hadara Street in Akrama, a busy commercial area, killing at least six civilians and injuring around 40 others. On 24 October, a car bomb exploded on Al-Ahram Street near Al-Nuzha Square in Homs, killing at least three civilians and injuring dozens; Jabhat al-Nusra claimed responsibility for the attack.

In 2014, further bombings targeted government-held neighborhoods of Homs. On 6 March, a car bomb struck Al-Zahra, killing and injuring civilians. On 17 March, another bombing hit the same neighborhood, causing additional civilian casualties. On 9 April, twin car bombs in Karm al-Louz killed dozens of civilians, including children; the attack was attributed to Jabhat al-Nusra. On 14 April, a car bomb on Oshak Street killed six civilians and injured many others. On 18 April, a car bomb near the Bilal al-Habashi Mosque on the edge of Akrama killed 14 civilians. On 29 April, twin car bombs in Al-Abbasiyah killed at least 45 people, many of them children, in an attack claimed by Jabhat al-Nusra. On 13 and 19 June 2014, car bombings in Wadi al-Dhahab killed seven and 19 civilians respectively. On 24 June, another car bomb exploded on Beit al-Taweel Street in Wadi al-Dhahab, killing two civilians and injuring 20 others.

== Bombing ==
The attacker initially detonated an IED that was in front of the Akrama al-Makhzumi Al-Muhdatha elementary school as students were leaving the school at noon. (Note: Both school and neighbourhood were named after Ikrima ibn Abi Jahl. Al-Muhdatha was later renamed after Iyad Kamel Harfoush, a major, died in Homs during the civil war in 2011.) Then he blew himself up at another gate of a nearby school, Akrama al-Makhzumi.

The double bombing killed 54 people, including 47 children, three members of the security forces, and four adult civilians. The attack was the deadliest strike to occur in a government controlled area in over a year, with no group immediately taking responsibility.

=== Perpetrators ===
According to local security sources, eleven suspects were apprehended in Talkalakh District on the border with Lebanon who were related to Jund al-Sham, a group linked to the Abdullah Azzam Brigades.

== Reactions ==
=== Public protests ===
Following the bombing, several protests broke out because of the government's failure to prevent the attack. Although most protestors were reportedly pro-government, many called for the removal of Talal Al-Barazi, the provincial governor for the Homs Governorate. Talal was never removed from office. Protests never turned to be anti-government.

=== Domestic and international reactions ===
The Syrian Foreign Ministry sent letters to the United Nations and Security Council, in which they accused the so-called "moderate armed opposition" of planning and executing the attacks. However, the members of the Security Council, Secretary-General Ban Ki-moon and Special Representative Leila Zerrougui all condemned the attack against civilians including children. UNICEF Representative in Syria Hanaa Singer condemned the bombing as a "despicable act against innocent children", noting that many victims were children leaving the school after classes.

British Minister for the Middle East Tobias Ellwood said: "I condemn recent attacks in Syria targeting civilians. These have included the bombing of a school in Homs, the continued use of indiscriminate barrel bombs by the Assad regime in Aleppo province, and the siege around Kobane. Such attacks underline the dreadful toll that the conflict continues to take on the Syrian people and we call on all parties to end the deliberate targeting of civilians. The UK will continue to press for those responsible for such attacks to be held accountable and to press for a political solution to bring to an end the suffering of the Syrian people."

== Sources ==
- OHCHR (13 August 2014). "Report of the independent international commission of inquiry on the Syrian Arab Republic" (PDF). Office of the United Nations High Commissioner for Human Rights.
