= Beit Ana =

Beit Ana بيت عانا
- Village
- Location in Syria
- Coordinates: 35°15′6″N 36°6′7″E
- Country: Syria
- Governorate: Latakia
- District: Jableh
- Subdistrict: Daliyah

Population (2004)
  - Total: 802
- Time zone: UTC+3 (EET)
  - Summer (DST): UTC+2 (EEST)

Beit Ana (Arabic: بيت عانا) is a Syrian village in the Jableh District of the southern Latakia Governorate in western Syria. According to the Syria Central Bureau of Statistics (CBS), Beit Ana had a population of 802 in the 2004 census. Its inhabitants are Alawites.
