= Supreme Alawite Islamic Council =

Syrian Council

- The Supreme Alawite Islamic Council in Syria and the Diaspora
- المجلس الإسلامي العلوي الأعلى
- Formation: February 2025–present
- Founder: Ghazal Ghazal
- Founded at: Syria
- Legal status: Council
- Headquarters: Latakia
- Official language: Arabic
- Sheikh: Ghazal Ghazal
- Website: Facebook

Supreme Alawite Islamic Council (Arabic: المجلس الإسلامي العلوي الأعلى) is a Syrian Council tasked with protecting the Alawites, and is led by Sheikh Ghazal Ghazal.

== History ==
=== Formation ===
It was founded in February 2025 by the Sheikh Ghazal Ghazal, refusing to work alongside Basil al-Khatib and Saleh Mansour on another Alawite council.

=== Statements ===
During the March 2025 Western Syria clashes, the council called for a "peaceful sit-in in the squares" in coastal regions, and "take to the streets and demonstrate in coastal cities and towns".

The council called for demonstrations on December 1, urging the community to protest peacefully.

The council condemned the Imam Ali Mosque attack, what it called a systematic campaign of killings, forced displacement, detentions and incitement against Alawites for more than a year, and called for large-scale peaceful demonstrations to condemn the ongoing violence. During the demonstration, the protesters were repressed, which the council condemning what described as the "systematic repression" suffered by unarmed civilians and stated that the protesters faced "all forms of terror and intimidation," citing violations (Note: Includes murder, beheadings, shootings, vehicular manslaughter, arrests, repression, and stoning.), described these acts as a "blatant and clear violation".
