= Tishrin, Hama =

Tishrin تشرين
- Village
- Location in Syria
- Coordinates: 35.170949°N 36.870246°E
- Country: Syria
- Governorate: Hama
- District: Hama
- Subdistrict: Hama

Population (2004)
  - Total: 392
- Time zone: UTC+3 (AST)
- City Qrya Pcode: N/A

Tishrin (Arabic: تشرين, romanized: Tišrīn) formerly known Rasm al Bagl (Arabic: رسم البغل, romanized: Rasm al-Baġl) is a Syrian village located in the Subdistrict of the Hama District in the Hama Governorate. According to the Syria Central Bureau of Statistics (CBS), Tishrin had a population of 392 in the 2004 census.
