= Western Syria clashes =

Assadist insurgency from 2024

- Part of the Aftermath of the Syrian civil war
- Assadist insurgency in coastal regions
| Date | 14 December 2024 – ongoing |
| Location | Western Syria, primarily Alawite-majority communities: Latakia Governorate; Tartus Governorate; Western Hama Governorate; Western Homs Governorate; Western Daraa Governorate |
| Result | Ongoing: Increase in fighting 6–12 March 2025; 2025 massacres of Syrian Alawites; Hezbollah–Syria clashes at the Lebanese–Syrian border |

Belligerents
| Syria (Note: Caretaker government until 29 March; Transitional government from 29 March); Counter protesters Saraya Ansar al-Sunnah | (Ba'athist Syria) Assadist insurgents; Syrian Popular Resistance; Military Council for the Liberation of Syria; Coastal Shield Brigade; (Ba'athist Syria) Saraya al-Jawad; (Ba'athist Syria) Fawj Azra'il al-Jabal; Hezbollah; Eastern Lebanese tribes; Alawite Protesters; Supreme Alawite Islamic Council |

Commanders and leaders
| (Syria) Ahmed al-Sharaa (Syria) Murhaf Abu Qasra (Syria) Hassan Abdul Ghani (Syria) Ali Noureddine al-Naasan (Syria) Anas Khattab (Syria) Mustafa Kneifati (Syria) Mohammed Othman (Syria) Ahmad al-Shami Abu Aisha al-Shami | (Ba'athist Syria) Suhayl al-Hasan; Munthir Wannus; Ghiath Dalla; Miqdad Fatiha (Ba'athist Syria) Mohammad Kanjo Hassan (POW) (Ba'athist Syria) Bassam Hussam al-Din † (Ba'athist Syria) Ibrahim Huweija (POW) (Ba'athist Syria) Daas Hassan Ali (POW) Ghazal Ghazal |

Units involved
| Syrian Armed Forces; Syrian Army; 40th Division; 56th Division; 62nd Division; 76th Division; 118th Division; Syrian Air Force; Ministry of Interior; (Syria) Internal Security Command; Syrian Special Missions Directorate; (Syria) Military Operations Command (until 2025); Sham Legion; (Syria) Syrian National Army (until 2025); (Syrian opposition) Hamza Division; Sultan Suleiman Shah Division; Sultan Murad Division; Sultan Mehmed the Conqueror Brigade | (Ba'athist Syria) Mohammad Kanjo Hassan loyalists; (Ba'athist Syria) Suhayl al-Hasan loyalists; (Ba'athist Syria) Mohsen al-Haymed's group; (Ba'athist Syria) Ahmad al-Labbad's group; NDF remnants; (Ba'athist Syria) Shabiha remnants |

Casualties and losses
| (Syria) 314 security forces killed (Note: 1 14 4 1 1 4 2 1 1 1 2 1 1 273 since 6 March 2025 2 1 1) (Syria) 4 security forces injured (Syria) 2 counter protesters injured | (Ba'athist Syria) 262 insurgents killed (Note: 3 2 1 259 (since 6 March) 1) (Ba'athist Syria) 201+ captured 3 protesters killed 60+ protestors injured |
- 2,388+ civilians killed in extrajudicial executions (Note: 108 234 4 1,659 (since 6 March))

Following the fall of the Assad regime after offensives by opposition groups in early December 2024, there were clashes between Assad loyalists and forces of the new Syrian caretaker government in the Alawite-majority Tartus and Latakia Governorates as well as in the western parts of the Hama and Homs Governorates.

The government took action through pursuing Assadist officers and officials in villages within Western Syria. The clashes were triggered by the proliferation of videos on social media showing footage of an attack on the Abu Abdullah al-Hussein al-Khusseibi shrine in Aleppo, which occurred in November. The incitement of violence and civil unrest among Alawite communities by Assadist elements has led to the formation of Alawite insurgent groups in Western Syria.

Following the collapse of Ba'athist Syria, there were frequent demands of vengeance against individuals involved with the deposed regime across parts of Western Syria. Sources such as the UK-based Syrian Observatory for Human Rights group also reported numerous extrajudicial executions of mainly Alawite civilians and former security personnel in the region, carried out by unidentified gunmen and fighters aligned with the Syrian caretaker government and nominally a part of the new Syrian Army as well as by Assad loyalists, resulting in the deaths of more than 2,388 civilians, at least 2,127 of whom were confirmed to have been killed in sectarian violence. (Note: Attributed to multiple sources:)

In early March, Assadist insurgents launched a coordinated attack on government forces in the coastal region, and government forces launched a counter-offensive. This was accompanied by sectarian violence, mainly against Alawites. The Syrian caretaker government announced it had completed its military operation against Assad loyalists on 10 March 2025, though attacks continued. By late May 2025, the Institute for the Study of War reported that Assadist insurgent attacks had largely stopped since March until later on in August when insurgent attacks continued.

== Background ==
In December 2024, a surprise offensive by Hay'at Tahrir al-Sham (HTS) and other rebel forces, some backed by Turkey, overthrew the government of Syrian President Bashar al-Assad, ending over five decades of Assad family rule in Syria. The surprise offensive, originating in the country's northwestern region, resulted in al-Assad and his family seeking asylum in Russia. HTS emir and military commander Ahmed al-Sharaa emerged as Syria's de facto leader following the fall of Damascus, with the majority of Syrian Armed Forces troops surrendering, fleeing the country, or defecting.

=== Civil unrest ===
After the fall of the Assad regime, escalating tensions were reported in Western Syria, particularly in regions with significant Alawite populations, with riots and civil unrest emerging in multiple locations including Tartus, Latakia, and Bashar's birthplace of Qardaha.

On 15 December 2024, the UK-based Syrian Observatory for Human Rights (SOHR) reported that pro-Assad insurgents were meeting with village elders in Latakia Governorate, instructing them to resist actions from the newly implemented Military Operations Administration in order to defend "the Alawite sect".

On 22 December 2024, SOHR reported that civilian demonstrations erupted in the Al-Bahluliyah district east of Latakia, following allegations of misconduct by the caretaker government's security forces, demanding the complete withdrawal of security forces from the village. SOHR said that the incident involved armed individuals claiming affiliation with the new government forcibly entering the residence of Al-Bahluliyah's Mukhtar. The intruders reportedly brandished weapons at young residents in the neighborhood and committed various acts of misconduct, including verbal and physical abuse against family members and a girl. SOHR reported that protesters chanted "Death rather than humiliation" in response.

On 23 December 2024, hundreds of Christians and their supporters marched through Damascus after foreign fighters from Ansar al-Tawhid set fire to a Christmas tree in Suqaylabiyah, a Christian town near Hama. Protestors urged the HTS authorities to protect minorities and for foreign fighters to leave Syria. HTS later said they had detained the arsonists.

Catholic News Agency reported on 31 December 2024 that some Muslim residents who were displaced from the town of Maaloula by the Assad regime, were threatening and harassing some Christian residents who were accused of collaborating with pro-Assad militant groups.

==== Attack on Alawite shrine ====
On 25 December, tensions inflamed amongst segments of the Syrian Alawite population in response to online circulation of videos showing footage of an attack on the Alawite shrine of Abu Abdullah al-Hussein al-Khusseibi in Aleppo. Though the incident had occurred weeks earlier, disinformation campaigns spread the footage as recent, aiming to incite discord and violent riots. The footage depicted attackers killing five shrine attendants, mutilating their bodies, damaging the site, and setting fire to the structure. The video provoked outrage among sections of Syria's Alawite population.

The demonstrations erupted across multiple Alawite neighborhoods in Homs, including Al-Khudari, Wadi Al-Dhahab, Al-Zahraa, Al-Sabil, Al-Abbasiya, and Al-Muhajireen. Protesters expressed outrage over the shrine attack through sectarian chants and public demonstrations, with religious and community leaders denouncing it as an attack on Alawite religious heritage and identity while calling for the perpetrators to be brought to justice. Protesters also demanded greater security be granted to the community by the government, and for it to remove all of the extremist and foreign elements from its military. Several protesters were arrested in Homs, Tartus, and Jableh. The Syrian General Security Service, operating under the new government's Military Operations Department, opened fire to disperse the crowd in Homs, resulting in one protester's death and five others sustaining injuries from gunfire.

It was soon discovered that the attack had occurred weeks earlier during clashes between Syrian opposition and Assad regime forces in Aleppo, and that the Alawite religious site had only been partially damaged, contrary to numerous social media posts that claimed it had been demolished. Verify Syria, a fact-checking organization, reported that a co-ordinated disinformation campaign was launched to circulate misleading posts related to the shrine attack through social media networks of Assad loyalists, who aimed to exacerbate sectarian tensions and provide cover for Assad regime officials fleeing Syria. In response to rising tensions, the new government enhanced its security presence in Alawite-dominated regions. Public Security Forces implemented a curfew across Homs, Jableh, and Banias, while military reinforcements established security perimeters around the Akrama and Al-Nahda neighborhoods to stop further unrest. They also established military checkpoints for civilians to hand over their weapons, and set up loudspeakers in mosques instructing them to do so within 24 hours. Many, especially commanders and officers associated with the Assad regime, refused to do so.

=== Pro-Assad disinformation campaign ===
Since the fall of the Assad regime in December 2024, Syria has experienced a surge in disinformation on social media, targeting both Syrian and international audiences. DW News reported that the flood of online disinformation and inflammatory social media posts has had destabilizing consequences on the ground, such as triggering Alawite riots after the widespread online circulation of misleading posts of a shrine attack that occurred in November.

Fact-checking organizations such as Verify-Sy and Misbar have attributed these campaigns to social media accounts associated with Assad loyalists, as well as state propaganda outlets of Russia and Iran. Ba'athist Syria had maintained an extensive state propaganda apparatus, and its collapse created an information vacuum. Researchers have noted that Russian and Iranian disinformation networks remain active in social media, deploying fake accounts to stoke tensions amongst minorities, particularly the Alawite community, and incite sectarian clashes. Accounts linked to far-right groups in the West have also been amplifying Islamophobic posts targeting Syrian revolutionary activists.

== Clashes ==
=== December ===
On 14 December, pro-Assad gunmen ambushed Sham Legion fighters in al-Muzayri'a in the Latakia countryside, killing four and wounding 11 others.

On 14 December, a raid on Al-Mazra'a in Homs Governorate, regarded as a significant Hezbollah stronghold, was launched by the Syrian Military Operations Administration, resulting in the arrests of "dozens of young men accused of committing previous violations against the people of the area". In an act of sectarian violence, on 1 February, Sunni gunmen killed 10 Alawites including a child and an elderly woman in the village of Arzah.

On 18 December, the Military Operations Administration conducted several raids in Hama and Homs Governorates and in several coastal areas to seek out Assad-associated figures and war criminals.

On 25 December, unidentified armed groups conducted synchronized assaults on multiple security checkpoints in the western Hama countryside with RPG launchers and heavy machine guns, killing one Syrian government troop and injuring another. On the same day, a contingent of the General Security Service – a police unit loyal to the new government – made their way to the Khirbet al-Ma'zah village in the southern Tartus Governorate. They intended to arrest Major General Mohammad Kanjo Hassan, who had headed the Military Justice Administration and Field Court during the rule of the Assad regime. He was regarded as one of those responsible for the mass murders in Saydnaya Prison. Upon entering the village, the General Security Service were ambushed by militants, with 14 policemen and three attackers being killed. According to SOHR, loyalists of Hassan and another former Ba'athist officer, Suhayl al-Hasan, were responsible for the ambush. The militants were led by Mohammad Kanjo Hassan's brother and expelled the security forces from the village. The caretaker government described the ambush as an attack by Assad loyalists. A curfew was declared at several cities.

The government's Military Operations Command subsequently ordered the arrest of the attackers and sent reinforcements to secure Khirbet al-Ma'zah. By 26 December, the Military Operations Command was conducting a large-scale campaign across Tartus Governorate, searching homes and securing the countryside. Hassan was reportedly captured in Khirbet al-Ma'zah. Three gunmen associated with Hassan were also killed in the gunfight. Hassan was former head of the military judiciary under the Assad regime and a Ba'athist prison officer at the Sednaya prison.

Other villages in the Tartus Governorate saw an "mass escape of former regime members". Two armed individuals from the village of Al-Zarqat, identified as regime loyalists or "shabiha," were killed after engaging in armed conflict with General Security Service. The security campaign prompted many former regime officials implicated in crimes against Syrian civilians to flee from several villages, including Al-Zuraiqat, Khirbet al-Ma'zah, and surrounding areas. In addition, four Syrian government troops were killed during a raid on a pro-Assad holdout containing trafficking ringleader Shujaa al-Ali in Balqsa, western Homs Governorate.

On 29 December 2024, a pro-Assadist group named the Syrian Popular Resistance announced their opposition to the HTS-led government and threatened to attack HTS forces in response to the civil unrest since the toppling of the Assad regime.

=== January ===
On 14 January, soldiers of the Military Operations Command were kidnapped and taken as hostages by the Assadist commander Bassam Hussam al-Din in Latakia Governorate. Bassam demanded Hay'at Tahrir al-Sham (HTS) forces in a video to withdraw from the area within 24 hours or else the soldiers taken hostage would be "slaughtered". Later that day, HTS found Bassam's location using a drone and sent reinforcements to the area to rescue the units taken hostage, and surrounded him in his hideout, ultimately leading to him ending his life by suicide bombing himself. Seven Assadist militants (such as Jaafar Mahmoud al-Said) were killed in clashes following the incident, and all kidnapped units were rescued safely and unharmed without any casualties.

On 16 January 2025, General Security Administration (GSA) ended an effort by pro-Iranian trafficking networks to smuggle weapons from the Tartus region to Lebanon.

On 18 January 2025, a commander in the Military Operations Command was killed during clashes with pro-Assad gunmen in the Talkalakh area in the western Homs countryside.

On 19 January, Syrian security forces captured and destroyed a massive Captagon shipment belonging to drug trafficking networks linked to Maher al-Assad. The Syrian Ministry of Interior announced that roughly 100 million Captagon pills were seized in warehouses near the port of Latakia.

On 22 January, pro-Assad gunmen targeted a checkpoint of the Military Operations Command with machine guns and grenades in the industrial area at the entrance of Jableh in the Latakia countryside. The attack left two members of the Military Operations Command dead and two other members injured.

On 24 January, a group of pro-Assad militants attacked a security checkpoint in al-Muzayri'a in the Latakia countryside. The General Security Service repelled the attack and confiscated a vehicle and several firearms from the gunmen who attacked the security checkpoint.

=== February ===
Calls for resistance by Assad loyalists in Western Syria have resulted in the formation of Alawite insurgent groups in the region. Iran has also been accused of sponsoring the insurgency against the Syrian caretaker government.

On 1 February, members of the Military Operations Command were ambushed by the Syrian Popular Resistance on the Latakia-Aleppo highway near Al-Mukhtariyah in Latakia countryside. As a result, one member was killed, two others were injured and a fourth one went missing.

On 2 February, unknown gunmen attacked the southern outpost of the General Security Service in Jableh city, Latakia countryside, in the early hours of Sunday morning. Clashes ensued between the attackers and security forces stationed at the outpost.

On 6 February 2025, the Syrian Popular Resistance claimed that it killed 9 fighters of the Syrian security forces, including a former HTS commander and a Turkistan Islamic Party in Syria commander.

On 6 February 2025, Syrian border security forces launched a large-scale security operation in the Western region of Homs, along the Lebanese border to dismantle smuggling networks and armed groups linked to Hezbollah, resulting in violent clashes, arrests, and the rescue of two kidnapped Syrian soldiers. The crackdown was part of the Syrian caretaker government's broader campaign to expel Hezbollah militants, dismantle trafficking activities in the Syrian border regions with Lebanon and eliminate Assadist insurgent groups.

On 9 February 2025, unidentified gunmen threw grenades on the surroundings of the criminal security branch in Latakia city in the early hours of Sunday morning before escaping.

By 10 February 2025, the Syrian military forces had established control over several border villages which were affected by the activities of smuggling networks linked to Hezbollah.

On 15 February 2025, four gunmen in a car threw two grenades at members of the Military Operations Command stationed at the traffic building in Al-Sheikh Daher neighborhood in Latakia city. Clashes erupted between the attackers and the security forces, but no casualties were reported.

On 15 February 2025, a member of the Military Operations Command was injured following an attack by unknown gunmen on a checkpoint at the entrance of Ba’areen town in western Hama countryside. The attack occurred in the early hours of the morning and triggered an armed clash between the gunmen and the security forces. Medium and machine guns were used during the attack, resulting in intense clashes between both sides.

On the same day, a new group called "Saraya Ansar al-Sunnah" emerged after it stated that its fighters attacked the town of Arzah and killed 12 Alawites and another 5 people it claimed were affiliated with the former Ba'athist government in Tell Dahab. The group stated that it would continue their attacks until the Alawites and Shia were "eliminated" or displaced from the region, it also stated that the group is decentralized with no formal headquarters, It is not clear who formed Saraya Ansar al Sunnah. The group also opposes the interim government's efforts to pardon former Ba'athist Syrian members.

On 23 February, a member of the Ministry of Defence was killed due to the targeting of a pick-up near Al-Jumhoriya Street in Latakia by gunmen. The vehicle deviated from the road as a result and injured a civilian and children.

On 23 February 2025, a member of the Military Operations Command died from injuries sustained during a combing operation a few days earlier in a village in the western Homs countryside.

On 27 February, a member of the Military Operations Command was killed due to injuries sustained in an attack on his vehicle carried out by pro-Assad gunmen near Al-Joumhouryah Street in Latakia.

On 28 February 2025, unidentified gunmen on two motorcycles threw grenades on an outpost in Safita town in Tartus countryside, before clashes erupted with members of the Military Operations Command stationed at the outpost. As a result of the clashes, a member of the Military Operations Command was injured and a civilian was killed after being caught in the crossfire. On the same day, a civilian and a member of the Military Operations Command were found dead in the former Russian base of Al-Su'ayrah, after having gone missing in Kaaf village in Al-Qadmous area in Tartus countryside. As a result, a curfew was imposed on the village and clashes took place between the Military Operations Command and local gunmen, which led to the injury of 10 people and the deaths of a member of the Military Operations Command and a local gunman.

=== Early March offensive ===
On 4 March, two members of Internal Security Forces were kidnapped by pro-Assad gunmen in Latakia, who were later found dead. Later during the day, pro-Assad gunmen attacked a patrol of Internal Security Forces near Al-Azhari roundabout in Latakia, where the two sides traded heavy gunfire.

On the same day, members of Mohsen al-Haymed's group had engaged with gunmen, reportedly part of a group led by Ahmad al-Labbad, in the city of Sanamayn, Daraa after leaving a funeral. Three members of al-Haymed's group died as a result of the attack, while one member and a child were injured. General Security Services arrived to restore order, but al-Haymed's group opened fire, wounding one officer, which led to clashes taking place between al-Haymed's group and security forces.

A wave of unrest struck the Western Syria coast (especially the villages of Beit Ana and Dalia in Latakia Province) on 6 March led by Alawites and Ba'athist insurgents. In Latakia, they killed 15 Syrian security personnel. In response to the uprising, the Syrian caretaker government sent reinforcements to the Western Syrian coast from Idlib, Hama, and Homs. The unrest started with Alawite figures in Tartus calling for protests against the new Syrian government, led by the Supreme Alawite Islamic Council. Sunnis in Jableh reacted by demanding the local police offices give them weapons to arm themselves. A curfew was also imposed on Homs. A public security force was also ambushed on the Banias-Jableh road and suffered casualties.

The pro-Assad insurgent group Coastal Shield Brigade was involved in the fighting. The Military Council for the Liberation of Syria was formed just prior to the uprising, and was also significantly involved in combat. Latakia's province director stated that an Assadist militant group affiliated with the Ba'athist military commander Suhayl al-Hasan and the newly-formed pro-Assad group Military Council for the Liberation of Syria conducted an attack in the city. Clashes in the village resulted in one security force member killed and two wounded. On 6 March 16 members of Military Operations Command were killed in Jableh.

On the day of the uprising, Syrian military expert Esmat al-Absi stated that Ba'athist supporters were trying to reignite strife in the region, but argued that the Syrian government would be able to keep the situation under control.

In Daraa, eight security forces were killed between 5 and 6 March, with three dying on 5 March. Two civilians also died, as well as nine members of al-Haymed's group. 60 militants were arrested as a result, though al-Haymed escaped the raid.

UK-based SOHR reported that Syrian security forces and pro-government fighters killed more than 300 Alawite civilians across parts of the Latakia countryside. Alawite civilians and their families fled to the Russian Khmeimim Air Base in Latakia province to seek refuge. Syrian Network for Human Rights (SNHR) reported that pro-Assad militant groups killed approximately 100 members of the Syrian General Security Service by 7 March 2025. Assadist insurgents also killed 15 civilians in the town of Jableh.

Syrian President Ahmed al-Sharaa warned in a speech broadcast on Telegram that the Assad loyalists had made an "unforgivable mistake," saying that "The riposte has come, and you have not been able to withstand it. Lay down your weapons and surrender before it's too late." The advisor to the former Alawite Council president, Muhammad Nasser, claimed to Al-Ahed that entire families had been executed. He and local Syrian sources alleged that over 1,700 civilians had been killed.

The Syrian caretaker government announced it had completed its military operation against Assad loyalists in western Syria on 10 March 2025.

Also on 10 March 2025, the SDF reached an agreement with the Syrian caretaker government to support the latter's military operations against the Assad loyalist insurgents.

=== After the March offensive ===
On 12 March, the Syrian Popular Resistance launched an attack on the government and seized fuel trucks, with the government likely failing to arrest those responsible.

On 13 March 2025, the Syrian Ministry of Defence announced the capture of four Assadist insurgents after a failed attempt to attack an army barracks in the countryside of Latakia.

By 24 March, the insurgency entered what the Coastal Shield Brigade termed its "second phase" by utilizing IEDs and assassinations against Islamist forces.

On 28 March, a member of the General Security Service died of injuries sustained the previous day in an armed attack on a security checkpoint by unidentified gunmen in Salanfah, in the northern countryside of Latakia.

On 28 March 2025 unknown gunmen ambushed a patrol of Internal Security Forces on the highway near a village adjacent to the city of Tartus. The attack left two members of the security forces dead, while the gunmen managed to escape.

On 30 March 2025, two members of the General Security Service were killed after unidentified gunmen in a Jeep opened fire on them in Talkalakh city, west of Homs. Following the attack, the security administration in Talkalakh imposed a curfew, ordered the closure of commercial shops, and instructed civilians to remain in their homes.

On 1 April, a member of the Military Operations Command was shot dead by unknown gunmen in Latakia countryside.

On 16 April, an Assadist insurgent was killed and another one captured in clashes at security headquarters in Hama Province.

In August, Ba'athist insurgents continued attacking the Syrian government, including attacks on Syrian MoD vehicles in the Latakia province.

On 4 September, IED attack on a Syrian government vehicle, where Rijal al Nour declared that it was carried out in revenge for the assassination of Bashar Mihoub in Tartus, the video only shows an explosion, not the target or the location.

On 9 September, Ba'athist militias assassinated a man from Hama Province for being an informant and a collaborator with Damascus.

On 20 September, a Government security forces member was killed and two others injured by an unidentified gunmen attack in Homs countryside.

On 24 September, government security forces attacked the villages of Hawarat Amurin, Nahr al-Bared, and Saqiyat Najm, northwest of Hama, killing two residents and arresting many.

On 29 September, Rijal al Nour detonated a roadside IED on a likely government position near Besayasin, Latakia Province and two other IEDs the next day. None of Rijal al Nour's IED attacks caused casualties. The group said that it conducted the attack in revenge for the killing of four Alawite construction workers in Jardin, Hama Province on 28 September.

==== Late 2025 pro-federalization protests ====
On 25 November, a protest by two hundred Alawites in Latakia called for federalization. A rival, pro-government protest took place. Gunshots were heard from unknown sources, and security forces fired gunshots into the air. Shots were fired at both protestors and security forces.

On 28 December, a pro-federalization Alawite-led protest of two thousand people in Latakia turned violent after security forces opened fire on the crowd. Three protesters and one security officer were killed while over 60 protesters were injured during the event. Alawite protests in Tartus and Jableh also took place. An unidentified person threw a grenade at a police station in Tartous, injuring two policemen. Following the protests, videos circulated on online social media, with one video appearing to show government forces firing directly at protestors in Latakia, and another appearing to show a car driving through the crowd of protestors at Azhari Roundabout in Latakia.

== Sectarian and revenge killings ==
On 14 December, UK-based Syrian Observatory of Human Rights (SOHR) NGO reported that the brother of the imam of the Great Prophet Mosque in Masyaf, Hama, was executed with three bullets by masked assailants who pursued and abducted him, after the imam was accused of being associated with Iranian and Shia militias and conducting funerals for regional civilians. Two civilians were kidnapped in Al-Zahraa, Homs. Their bodies were discovered in a cooling unit three days later.

On 15 December, SOHR reported that three civilians were killed in separate instances by unknown gunmen, one of whom was accused of being an Assad loyalist and tortured before being executed in Halfaya, Hama.

On 16 December, SOHR reported that a former Syrian Arab Army soldier and his brother were kidnapped by unknown assailants in a military vehicle as they were in line at a settlement center meant for resolving their security status in the new state. The two were killed, with their bodies disposed of in a forest Wa'er. Masked assailants kidnapped a civilian at gunpoint in Al-Shajar, and executed him near an al-Ghab agricultural research center northwest of Hama.

On 17 December, SOHR reported that one civilian was killed by gunmen in Al-Qusayr. Two more civilians were killed by unknown gunmen in Al-Suwaydah, Masyaf. An armed group attacked civilians in Al-Shajar, and kidnapped a farmer who was later found dead with signs of having been tortured beforehand.

On 18 December, SOHR reported that a man in al-Tuwaim in the western Hama countryside was killed by two unidentified gunmen after he had tried to stop them from stealing his sheep. On 21 December, SOHR reported that a young man was abducted from his home in Tartus by an unknown armed group after they promised to help him with resolving his security status in the new state, who executed him and mutilated his corpse. On 22 December, SOHR reported that a young man was kidnapped near Homs, taken to Baniyas, and executed in a field by unknown gunmen.

On 23 December, SOHR reported that a man and woman were killed in Wadi Al-Nasara by unknown perpetrators. A Yahmour, Homs resident was killed by unknown gunmen after being accused of loyalty to the Assad regime. An unidentified man was found killed by a "field execution" near the Ras Al-Shamra roundabout in Latakia. After one group of unknown gunmen raided and left Hadidah, a second group entered and killed two civilians for unknown reasons.

On 24 December, three Alawite judges were executed by unknown gunmen while travelling in the western Hama countryside. The judges, who handled administrative cases related to land ownership, had traveled for discussions with officials of the new government. Photographs of their bodies were circulated online. Their widows stated that the judges were optimistic about their professional prospects and had been in talks about continuing their work under the new administration. According to SOHR, several gunmen attacked and looted the residents of seven houses in the Alawite-majority village of Jidrin.

On 25 December, SOHR reported that a medical student was shot dead by an unknown gunman in Latakia. One civilian was found dead on the M4 Motorway in Ariha, Idlib, having been killed by a "field execution". Three more were killed by unknown gunmen in Tal Sarin, Hama. An information engineering university student was executed in the countryside of Jableh by unknown gunmen.

On 26 December, SOHR reported that an armed group raided the western Hama Governorate village of al-Aziziyah located in the Ghab Plain, and executed a civilian before arresting eight others and taking them to an unknown location.

On 5 January 2025, it was reported that six bodies of workers belonging to the Sayyida Zeinab Shrine were found. The pro-Assad Syrian Popular Resistance accused the HTS-led government of killing the workers.

On 8 January 2025, SOHR reported that three civilians of one family were killed in a field execution by unidentified gunmen in Latakia. Another civilian was shot dead by unidentified gunmen in his agricultural land in Hama. Four more people, including three brothers from Tasnin Village near Talbiseh were shot dead by gunmen, while working on the field. It was also reported that the bodies of six civilians were found, two of which were from Khirbet al-Hamam and four from al-Ghazila, where they were reported missing a few days ago in mysterious circumstances while heading to their work and visiting their relatives in Homs countryside.

On 10 January 2025, UK-based SOHR reported that a young man from Qardaha in Latakia countryside was killed by unknown gunmen in Hama, where his body was moved to Hama National Hospital. Additionally, a young man, who a student at the College of Engineering, was killed with several gunshots to the head by unknown gunmen, after which his body was thrown into an irrigation canal and later moved to the hospital in Al-Zahra'a neighborhood in Homs.

On 13 January 2025, SOHR alleged that two gunmen claiming to belong to the Military Operations Command kidnapped a young man in al-Samiya Village in Latakia countryside, whose body was later found with gunshot wounds, showing signs of a field execution. Meanwhile, the body of another young man, who had been kidnapped from al-Mazra'a Village in the Homs countryside four days earlier, was discovered with gunshot wounds.

On 14 January 2025, SOHR asserted that Alawite civilians of Tasnin Village in Homs countryside were assaulted by gunmen who presented themselves as members of the Military Operations Command. According to SOHR, an arrest campaign was launched in the village, which lasted from the early hours of morning to the afternoon of 16 January, during which suspects showed resistance. Moreover, the attackers set fire to seven houses and killed six civilians from the village. Residents and elders of Tasnin Village and other neighbouring villages attempted to communicate with security and political officials and police command in Homs, but received no responses regarding the violations.

On 16 January 2025, SOHR reported that a young man was killed in indiscriminate gunfire in Jableh in Latakia countryside, while he was celebrating his release from the grip of a group of gunmen. Additionally, two civilians from Al-Majdal village in Mahradah area in the north-western countryside of Hama were kidnapped and shot dead by unidentified gunmen. On 21 January, SOHR asserted that four civilians were killed by local gunmen in a town in the north-western countryside of Homs, during a security operation initiated by the Syrian caretaker government. Residents of the town confirmed that troops of the caretaker government treated them fairly and were not involved in the killing.

On 23 January 2025, SOHR reported that a large-scale security campaign was launched by the Military Operations Command with the participation of local gunmen in the villages of al-Ghozaylah, al-Gharbiyah and al-Hamam in the western countryside of Homs, during which four civilians were extrajudicially executed, ten civilians were injured, and five others were arrested. Several additional assaults and abuses against civilians, such as forcing them to bray and bark, as well as the destruction of tombstones were also documented.

On 30 January 2025, SOHR reported that 10 civilians were executed by unknown gunmen in Arzah village in the north-western countryside of Homs. The gunmen knocked on the doors of several houses in the village and opened fire on civilians, using guns with silencers, and then fled.

On 1 February 2025, a young man died under torture at a security centre after being arrested during a security campaign in Al-Shaniyah village in Homs countryside. Preliminary reports indicated that the young man was subjected to brutal torture prior to his death. On the same day, two young men from Al-Kanisa village in Homs countryside were killed in prisons after being arrested during a security campaign on the village on 22 December. According to reliable SOHR sources, one of the men had been shot in the foot during the campaign. Both men died in the prisons of the Military Operations Command, and their bodies were handed over to their families today. Also on the same day, unidentified gunmen stormed Tel Dahab village, inhabited by Shiite residents, in eastern Hama countryside. The attackers executed five people before fleeing to an unknown location. In a separate incident, a young man from Al-Mazra’a neighbourhood in Homs city was shot dead by unidentified gunmen in a sectarian killing.

On 2 February 2025, a group of 12 armed individuals on four motorcycles attacked a house in Shammyah Al-Muhalabah village, Latakia countryside. According to reliable SOHR sources, the gunmen forced their way into the house, then planted drugs and bullets, falsely accusing the residents of possession. They also stole US$1,000. The attackers shouted sectarian insults, issued threats of murder and rape if the victims reported the incident, and then fled to an unknown destination. On the same day, the body of a young man was found near Tel Al-Nasr graveyard in Homs countryside. He had been shot in the head with his body showing signs of torture. According to reliable SOHR sources, the young man, from Al-Kanisa village in western Homs countryside, had been arrested by gunmen affiliated with the Military Operations Command on 22 December. In an unrelated incident on the same day, the body of a former engineer colonel from the Scientific Research Department was brought to Homs Hospital, ten days after being arrested during a security campaign by factions of the Military Operations Command in Damascus on 22 December. The man was from Al-Qanaqiya village in Homs countryside. Additionally, unidentified gunmen opened fire on civilians near a coffee shop at the junction of Baniyas-Jableh, resulting in the deaths of a former officer and a worker at the coffee shop. Meanwhile, several vehicles belonging to factions affiliated with the General Administration stormed Al-Dabin village in Homs countryside, attacking a civilian's house. A young man was killed, and his father-in-law was injured. The gunmen fired shots into the air to intimidate the residents before dragging the bodies away and withdrawing from the village.

On 3 February 2025, residents discovered the body of a young man from Al-Mohajereen neighbourhood in Homs, who had been shot in the head in a field execution. His body was dumped near Tel Al-Nasr graveyard. The victim, belonging to the Alawite Murshidi sect, had been kidnapped two days earlier by unidentified gunmen.

On 4 February 2025, a young man died in a prison in Homs following his arrest during a security campaign by armed factions of the Military Operations Command in Homs city. His body, showing signs of torture, was identified by his family at the hospital. The authorities refused to hand over the body to the family, and he was subsequently buried in a mass grave.

On 5 February 2025, the body of a young man was found who was shot dead inside an agricultural chamber on his land, located south of Ba’iyon village on the border between Talkalakh and Homs countryside. He had been killed by unidentified gunmen in a field execution. In a separate incident, the body of another young man was found dumped in the Al-Qaseer area in Homs countryside, after his village had been stormed by unidentified gunmen a few days earlier. On the same day, the bodies of two women were found, both shot in the head, one of whom was Nagham Eissa from the Akrama neighborhood in Homs City. She had been kidnapped two days prior, and the kidnappers had demanded 500,000,000 Syrian Liras from her husband for her release.

On 5 February 2025, SOHR reported the displacement of several families from villages in Hama countryside, inhabited by minorities, to villages and towns on the Syrian coast due to the escalation of revenge attacks and executions in these areas. According to reliable SOHR sources, villages and towns in northeastern Hama countryside, including Mariod, Al-Talisiya, Al-Zughba, Ma’an, Al-Mabtan, Abo Mansaf, Al-Touba, Al-Fan Al-Wastany, and Al-Fan Al-Qobly, witnessed the complete displacement of their residents. Moreover, families from Al-Sheikh Ali, Qasoun, Om Tarikiya, Al-Shaiha, Al-Ruwaif, Al-Shuhba, Al-Shahib, Tel Abd Al-Aziz, and Nawa in Al-Salmiyah and Al-Hamra countryside, as well as from Kafr Al-Toun and Arza in western Hama countryside, had also displaced to other villages.

On 6 February 2025, the body of a young man was found in Al-Zahraa neighborhood in Homs province, displaying gunshot wounds and signs of torture. The man had been kidnapped three days earlier. On the same day, a large convoy of the General Security Service stormed the Al-Daatour neighborhood in Latakia city. During the escalation, security forces shot and killed two civilians. One man was shot while inside his car, and another was killed after refusing to comply with the security forces' orders. The storming of the neighborhood and the indiscriminate killings triggered panic among local residents. The perpetrators were not arrested.

On 7 February 2025, a civilian was killed, and another was severely injured when unidentified gunmen opened fire on them while they were in Hamisa Farm in Al-Sheikh Badr in Tartous province. The attackers, driving a van, shot the victims directly. The injured person was taken to a hospital for treatment. On the same day, the body of a young man from Homs countryside was found showing signs of gunshot wounds, indicating a field execution. The body was dumped on the road to Al-Qosair Square in Homs countryside. Additionally on the same day, a civilian died in the prisons of the Military Operations Command in Homs after being arrested during a security campaign in Damascus in Al-Ghazila Village nearly 15 days earlier. It is worth noting that he had previously undergone reconciliation with the authorities.

On 8 February 2025, the bodies of three persons, including a woman, were found dumped on the road to Al-Mashrafah village in Masyaf countryside, Hama. The victims, who were from the Alawite community, had been kidnapped a week prior. On the same day, three people hailing from the Al-Zahraa neighborhood in Homs were shot dead in a field execution after being arrested by the General Security Administration of the Military Operations Command during a security campaign in the city of Homs.

On 9 February 2025, a young man was kidnapped in Jableh city after gunmen in a silver "Santafe" vehicle blocked his car. The gunmen, claiming to be part of the Military Operations Command, beat the young man and shot him in one of his legs when he refused to go with them without proof of identity. His friend, who was with him, was assaulted, struck in the face, and shot at between his feet. Before fleeing, the gunmen fired at the car to prevent pursuit and then took the young man to an unknown destination.

On 10 February 2025, the body of a civilian in his sixties was found dumped on the road to Al-Tuwaym in the western countryside of Hama. On the same day, the bodies of two brothers and an unidentified individual were discovered on a farm in Morek, in the countryside of Hama. According to reliable SOHR sources, the two brothers had been kidnapped earlier near Al-Aseel Roundabout in the Karm Al-Louz neighbourhood of Homs while returning from a restaurant. In Latakia province, the body of a man in his thirties was found with his hands bound near the beach in Jableh city, two days after being kidnapped. Also in Latakia, an 80-year-old man was found dead in his home in Al-Maqate’ in Jableh countryside; the body showed signs of gunshot wounds. Meanwhile, two brothers from the Shiite community were killed after being kidnapped on 6 February 2025 by unidentified individuals while on their way to Homs city. The brothers were from Umm Al-Ammad village in the eastern countryside of Homs.

On 11 February 2025, a shopkeeper was shot dead by two unidentified gunmen on a motorcycle in the Al-American neighbourhood of Latakia city. On the same day, the bodies of two civilians from Al-Mushairfah village in north-eastern Homs countryside were found and transferred to Al-Waleed Hospital in Al-Wa’er neighborhood in Homs city. The married couple had been kidnapped two weeks earlier while heading to the vegetable market (Al-Hal) in a cargo vehicle. Additionally, an employee at a clinic in Al-Aziziya village, located in the western countryside of Hama, was shot dead by masked gunmen on motorbikes. The attack occurred near a security checkpoint as the victim was returning home from work. A young man in his twenties was also shot and killed by unidentified gunmen while on his way to visit his sister in Al-Sindiyana village in the countryside of Homs. The assailants stopped the victim and opened fire before fleeing the scene.

On 12 February 2025, the body of a young man was found in Homs city, a week after he had been kidnapped by unidentified gunmen. On the same day, the bodies of engineer Shawkat Ahmed and his wife were discovered in the villages of Basira Al-Jard and Safira in Tartus countryside. Both victims had been shot in a field execution. In Hama countryside, a young man from Suran was found injured after being taken by unidentified gunmen to a driving school in northern Hama and shot.

On 13 February 2025, a civilian from the Al-Na’em tribe was shot dead by unidentified gunmen in Tel Khaznah village, located near Salamiyah city in Hama countryside. According to sources, the victim was heading to the village to sell sheep when he was shot for unknown reasons. On the same day, a young man from the Alawite community was shot dead by unidentified gunmen near Al-Maydan neighborhood in Mahradah city, located in western Hama countryside. The victim, who worked in transporting and selling chicken, was killed under unknown circumstances.

On 14 February 2025, a group of gunmen, who claimed to be members of the General Security Service, kidnapped a young man in the early hours of the morning in front of his brother's house in Homs city. When the young man's brother and their neighbor attempted to verify the gunmen's identities, they were also abducted. The fate of the three individuals remains unknown, and appeals have been made for their whereabouts to be disclosed. On the same day, the body of a young man was found dumped in a farm in Al-Shalouh village in western Homs countryside, after having been missing for 12 hours. According to reliable sources from the Syrian Observatory for Human Rights, the victim was from the Shiite community and worked in agriculture. Additionally, two Shiite men were killed on this day in separate incidents in Homs countryside. The first victim, an elder man, was arrested earlier that day from his house in Om Al-Amad village by individuals wearing military uniforms of the Military Operations Command. His body was later found in National Al-Salmiya Hospital and his car was discovered burnt in eastern Homs countryside. The second victim, a civilian in his 60s, was killed in Tension village in northern Homs countryside by individuals also wearing Military Operations Command uniforms. The victim was driving his car when he was attacked, and his body was found at the site of the attack, with no one approaching it afterward.

On 16 February 2025, an Alawite civilian was kidnapped in the Al-Bayadah neighborhood of Homs according to SOHR. His body was found 48 hours later at Karam Al-Louz hospital in Homs.

On 18 February 2025, SOHR reported the death of a Shia civilian who had previously been arrested by the General Security Service during a security campaign in the town of Ghawr Gharbiyah in the north-western countryside of Homs and jailed, whose body arrived to Homs Hospital showing signs of torture.

On 24 February 2025, a civilian was found dead in the Al-Waar Al-Jazirah neighborhood of Homs after being kidnapped two days prior by masked gunmen claiming to be members of the General Security Service.

On 27 February 2025, four Alawite civilians, one of whom was disabled, were killed when masked assailants in two cars opened fire with machine guns. The attack occurred while the young men were sitting in a cafeteria near Al-Kharab Bridge in Baniyas. After the shooting, the gunmen fled to an unknown destination. On the same day, in Ain Shams village in Masyaf countryside, Hama province, a large-scale military campaign was carried out by the Military Operations Command under the pretext of "prosecuting affiliates of the former regime." Despite the village's prior reconciliation efforts, the operation led to the deaths of three civilians—one of whom had been arrested before being executed and dumped on a road to Hama. Additionally, seven civilians were injured. The campaign also saw mass detentions, with 52 civilians, including children and the elderly, arrested, and six others reported missing. SOHR confirmed that the attackers opened heavy fire, causing panic, and some detainees were brutally beaten and verbally abused. One individual sustained a gunshot wound to the leg. The event was covered by media outlets and drones, sparking further outrage and confusion among residents.

On 4 March 2025, amid heightened security tensions in Latakia, two men were killed by members of the Internal Security Forces of the Military Operations Command during a raid on the predominantly Alawite Al-Da’atour neighborhood in Latakia city. According to SOHR sources, four individuals were also arrested, and several houses were stormed, sustaining damage due to indiscriminate gunfire.

On 5 March 2025, a civilian working as a math teacher at Al-Hassan Ibn Al-Haitham School in the Al-Wa’ar neighborhood of Homs was killed after being kidnapped the previous day. The abductors, claiming to be members of the Internal Security forces, executed him with gunshots to the head. His body was later discovered in a hospital in Homs.

On 27 March 2025, the SOHR reported that more than 1659 Alawite civilians have been massacred by the Syrian government in western Syria since 6 March 2025.

On 28 March 2025, the body of a young man was found in the city of Homs, 21 days after he was kidnapped from the Karam Shamsham neighborhood by five unidentified gunmen in a van. On the same day, residents of Al-Sheikh Saad area in Tartus countryside were harassed by members of a checkpoint, who subjected them to random shooting, sectarian verbal insults as they passed through, and confiscated their identity cards, including those of individuals who had undergone security reconciliation.

On 29 March 2025, the body of a young man from Jenyenat Rslan village was found near Drekish in the Tartus countryside, after he had gone missing in the vicinity of the Al-Heishah Karto area. On the same day, the bodies of two civilians were found near an electric generator in Baniyas, a day after they had been arrested by the General Security Forces. The families of the victims had tried to determine the reasons for their arrest and even offered money in exchange for their release, but their requests were rejected by the General Security Forces.

On 30 March 2025, two gunmen, a member of the General Security Forces and his son, stormed a house in the Karam Al-Zaytoun neighbourhood of Homs city and opened fire on those inside, killing a woman and three of her children—including a girl—and injuring the owner of the house, all of whom were members of the Alawite community. Two additional Sunni civilians from the Bakar family, who were guests in the home, were also killed. On the same day, the bodies of 11 civilians were found with gunshot wounds to the head, dumped in the Jubar River west of the Baniyas refinery in Tartus countryside. It remains unclear whether the victims were among the hundreds of residents from Al-Qosour neighbourhood in Baniyas who are still missing, with no confirmed information on whether they were executed or fled to other areas.

On 31 March 2025, a tenth-grade student from Shaas village was shot dead at a checkpoint near Kartu junction in Tartus countryside. According to SOHR sources, the student was in a car passing near Al-Marmalah area when the driver encountered gunmen blocking the road. As the driver attempted to turn back, fearing an attack, the gunmen opened fire on the vehicle, killing the student. On the same day, six civilians, including a village elder, were executed and several others from the Alawite community injured in an armed attack on Harf Banmarah village in Baniyas countryside, Tartus province. According to local sources, the attackers departed from Al-Desaynah base—previously used by regime forces—and returned there after the assault. The base is reportedly occupied by forces affiliated with the Ministry of Defense (Syria). SOHR sources noted that the attackers shouted sectarian slogans and issued death threats prior to the attack, causing widespread panic in the area. In the aftermath of the massacre, residents of Harf Banira, Deir Al-Bishl, Balghonas, and Al-Tela villages in Baniyas countryside began fleeing toward the mountains and other safer areas, amid rising fears of continued violence and appeals to secure the region against further attacks.

On 1 April 2025, the body of a young man from Barmaya in Baniyas countryside was discovered near a General Security Service checkpoint in Al-Rabiya area, showing signs of gunshot wounds to the head, indicating a field execution. The man had been reported missing the previous day.

On 2 April 2025, the body of a civilian from the Shiite community in Al-Kazemyah village, Homs countryside, was found showing signs of slaughter and gunshot wounds, indicating an execution. The man had reportedly received assurances from armed groups affiliated with the Military Operations Administration. Additionally, the body of a 19-year-old boy from Khirbet Al-Tein village was found after being missing for several days.

On 3 April 2025, a young man and a boy under the age of eighteen from Qubat Al-Kurdi village in Hama countryside were shot dead by unidentified gunmen in a silver "Santa Fe" car. The victims were transporting milk on their motorcycle from their village to Tel Al-Darrah in Sallamiyah countryside when they were attacked. On the same day, a young man was shot dead by unidentified gunmen in the same silver car, in Ghur Al-Assi village in Hama countryside. Also on the same day, the bodies of two young men from Dreikish city in Tartus countryside were found dumped near Tal Al-Khedr/Al-Khedr hill in Safyta area. The men had been kidnapped by unidentified gunmen, and the bodies showed signs of gunshot wounds. A civilian from Um Al-Saraj village in eastern Homs was also killed on the same day by unidentified gunmen in a silver Jeep near the junction of Dahnah village. According to SOHR sources, the gunmen blocked the victim's way and attempted to kidnap him. He was shot dead as he tried to escape.

On 4 April 2025, the bodies of five members of an Alawite family, including a child, were found in Al-Wa’ar Hospital in Homs, after having been kidnapped earlier in the day by unidentified gunmen. The victims were abducted from their home located between Al-Sabeel and Al-Bayyadiyah neighbourhoods. On the same day, two brothers from Harison village in Baniyas countryside, were shot dead by unidentified gunmen on a motorbike while traveling on Arab Al-Malak road near the wall of the Syrian Oil Transport Company. In a separate incident the same day, unidentified gunmen kidnapped four young men from Al-Hataniya in Baniyas countryside and later released them after subjecting them to physical assault. Also on the same day, the body of a pregnant woman was found dumped in the forest of Al-Halw Mountain in western Homs countryside, near an Air Defence battalion. The victim had been killed in what residents described as a particularly inhumane scene.

On 9 November 2025, two gunmen atop a motorcycle opened direct fire on Hussein Issa Alloush al-Youssef, a 50-year-old member of the Alawite community, and Fadi Riyad al-Atram, a 35-year-old Syrian Christian, in the town of Rabla, southern Homs countryside. The armed attack left both men critically injured, dying at nearby hospitals after succumbing to their severe wounds.

On 16 December 2025, Saraya Ansar al Sunnah claimed an IED attack on an Alawite Mosque in the Alawite neighborhood of Wadi Dahab, Homs City, in coordination with another group, killing at least eight people and wounded 21 more.

== Analysis ==
In a report published on 10 March, the Institute for the Study of War reported that insurgency was not confined only to the Western coastline, but also in the Euphrates River Valley in eastern Syria, alongside other parts of the country. It found that areas with a heavy insurgent presence included the city of Latakia, Tartus, Qardaha, Masyaf, parts of Homs, parts of Aleppo, areas near Damascus, alongside the Deir-ez-Zor area. Though it underscored this by highlighting that likely many more parts of Syria have insurgent presences. It argued that these insurgents likely enjoyed support from Hezbollah's smuggling networks alongside Alawite mountain villages.

The 6 March Uprising was analysed to not likely have had the goal of overthrowing the government or seizing territory as they did not attempt to seize "key government infrastructure and [defend] the approaches to the city...".

By late May 2025, the Institute for the Study of War reported that Assadist insurgent attacks had largely stopped since the coordinated attacks in March. The ISW said "This suggests that the insurgency has weakened significantly" and it suggested this was due to "Multiple factors, including a lack of Alawite support, government pressure, and poorly executed insurgent operations".
