= Axis of Resistance =

Iran-led military coalition in West Asia

Axis of Resistance محور مقاومت (Persian) محور المقاومة (Arabic)
- Administrative center: Tehran, Iran
- Languages: Arabic; Persian
- Type: Military coalition (unofficial)
- Membership: Member states: Iran; Palestine (Gaza Strip under Hamas); Yemen (Supreme Political Council under the Houthis); Former: Ba'athist Syria (until 2024); Non-state members: Al-Ashtar Brigades; Al-Mukhtar Brigades; Amal Movement; Coastal Shield Brigade; Hezbollah; Hezbollah Afghanistan; Islamic Resistance Movement of Azerbaijan; Islamic Resistance in Jordan; Islamic Resistance Front in Syria; Liwa Fatemiyoun; Liwa Zainebiyoun; Military Council for the Liberation of Syria; Palestinian Joint Operations Room; Popular Mobilization Forces; Sipah-e-Muhammad Pakistan; State of Law Coalition; Syrian Popular Resistance; Syrian Social Nationalist Party; Waad Allah Brigades; Former: Sabireen Movement; Tehreek-e-Jafaria; Fatah Alliance

Leaders
  - Supreme Leader: Mojtaba Khamenei
  - President: Masoud Pezeshkian
  - Commander of the Quds Force: Esmail Qaani
- Establishment: c. 1982
Preceded by
People's Revolutionary Organization of the Islamic Republic of Iran

The Axis of Resistance (Note: In the local languages: Persian: محور مقاومت, romanized: Mehvar-e Moqâvemat; Arabic: محور المقاومة, romanized: Miḥwar al-Muqāwamah; Azerbaijani: Müqavimət Oxu; Urdu: محور مزاحمت, romanized: Mahur Mazahmat) or Resistance Front is an informal Iran-led military coalition that operates across West Asia. It currently unites a variety of armed groups allied with Iran and committed primarily to countering the influence of Iran's rivals in the region: the United States, Israel, Saudi Arabia, and the United Arab Emirates. It was formerly supported by Syria, which hosted both Iranian troops and allied non-Iranian fighters until the fall of the Assad regime in 2024.

The "Axis" in question mainly consists of Shia Islamist militant organizations, such as Hezbollah in Lebanon, the Islamic Resistance and the Popular Mobilization Forces in Iraq, and the Houthis in Yemen. (Note: Officially the Ansarullah movement, de facto government in Northwestern Yemen since 28 July 2016 under the Supreme Political Council.) It intermittently includes certain Palestinian militant organizations (typically Sunni Islamist), such as Hamas and Islamic Jihad. (Note: Hamas is the Arabic abbreviation for the official name "Islamic Resistance Movement" (Ḥarakat al-Muqāwamah al-ʾIslāmiyyah). The Gaza Strip was ruled by a Hamas government from 2006 until its resignation under the Gaza peace plan.) Iran's continued support for this coalition is said to be motivated in part by a desire to keep confrontations away from its borders as part of its "forward defence" philosophy, which pursue domestic interests while collectively mobilizing for a shared broader goal of militarily exhausting Israel and imposing a cost on United States foreign policy in the Middle East. The United States designates most of the coalition's members as terrorist organizations, but between 2014 and 2017, the United States military and Iranian proxy forces under Qasem Soleimani effectively conducted their offensives in unison during the War against the Islamic State.

On several occasions, the Axis of Resistance has carried out direct attacks on United States troops in Iraq. Through the Quds Force of the Islamic Revolutionary Guard Corps, the Iranian government had been spending an estimated US$700 million annually on providing extensive military and logistical support to the coalition's members, but this expenditure began dwindling after 2019 as a result of international sanctions against Iran.

The Middle Eastern crisis, which began with the October 7 attacks against Israel in 2023, has weakened the Axis of Resistance and the strategy behind it, according to an analysis by the Associated Press. The network suffered significant and repeated setbacks to Israeli military operations over the course of the Gaza war, the Israel–Hezbollah conflict, and the Twelve-Day War. It was also greatly disrupted by the 2024 Syrian opposition offensives, which entirely reversed the progress of the Iranian intervention in the Syrian civil war. The rest of the Axis of Resistance remains intact as of December 2024.

== History ==
=== Etymology ===
The term "Axis of Resistance" was first used by the Libyan daily newspaper Al-Zahf Al-Akhdar in response to American president George W. Bush's claim that Iran, Ba'athist Iraq, and North Korea formed an axis of evil. Its 2002 article, "Axis of evil or axis of resistance", said "the only common denominator among Iran, Iraq, and North Korea is their resistance to U.S. hegemony". The Iranian newspaper Jomhuri-ye Eslami subsequently adopted the language in reference to the Shia insurgency in Iraq, writing in 2004: "If the line of Iraq's Shi'is needs to be linked, united, and consolidated, this unity should be realized on the axis of resistance and struggle against the occupiers."

In 2006, the Palestinian minister of the interior, Said Saim, used the term during an interview at Al-Alam television to refer to common political goals among Arabs in opposition to those of Israel or the United States. Noting the large number of Palestinian refugees in Syria, Saim stated, "Syria is also an Islamic Arab country and is also targeted by the Americans and the Zionists. Hence, we see in Syria, Iran, Hezbollah, and Hamas an axis of resistance in front of these pressures."

The term "axis of resistance" was used as early as August 2010. After two years, Ali Akbar Velayati, senior advisor for foreign affairs to Iran's supreme leader, used the term and said:

The chain of resistance against Israel by Iran, Syria, Hezbollah, the new Iraqi government, and Hamas passes through the Syrian highway. ... Syria is the golden ring of the chain of resistance against Israel.

The phrase was used again in August 2012 during a meeting between Syrian president Bashar al-Assad and the secretary of Iran's Supreme National Security Council, Saeed Jalili, regarding the Syrian civil war. Velayati said:

What is happening in Syria is not an internal issue, but a conflict between the axis of resistance and its enemies in the region and the world. Iran will not tolerate, in any form, the breaking of the axis of resistance, of which Syria is an intrinsic part.

=== Foundation ===
In the wake of the 1979 Iranian Revolution, some of the most radical founders of the Islamic Revolutionary Guard Corps such as Mohammad Montazeri (who had been trained by the Palestinian Fatah in Southern Lebanon and maintained close relations with Gaddafi's Libya) and Mostafa Chamran (who had visited Cuba and was influenced by revolutionary internationalism) strove to create what is often called an "Islamic Internationale", drawing upon Ali Shariati's and Ayatollah Khomeini's notions of the "solidarity of the oppressed". Montazeri and Chamran, along with Ali Akbar Mohtashamipur, Iran's ambassador to Syria from 1982, created the Department for Islamic Liberation Movements, as part of the People's Revolutionary Organization of the Islamic Republic of Iran, whose aim was to bring together the activities of the outlawed Iraqi Islamic Dawa Party and Badr Organization with those of the Lebanese Amal Movement and Hezbollah. The Department for Islamic Liberation Movements is thought to have been the starting point of Iranian attempts of forging what was later to become known as the Axis of Resistance.

=== Evolution ===
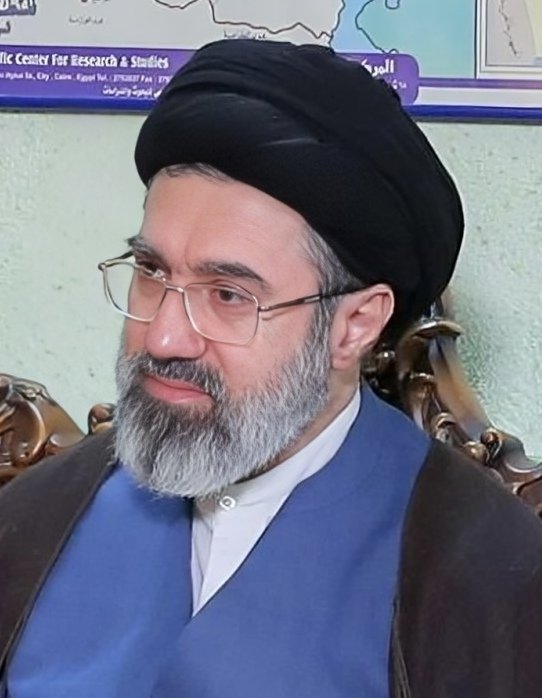
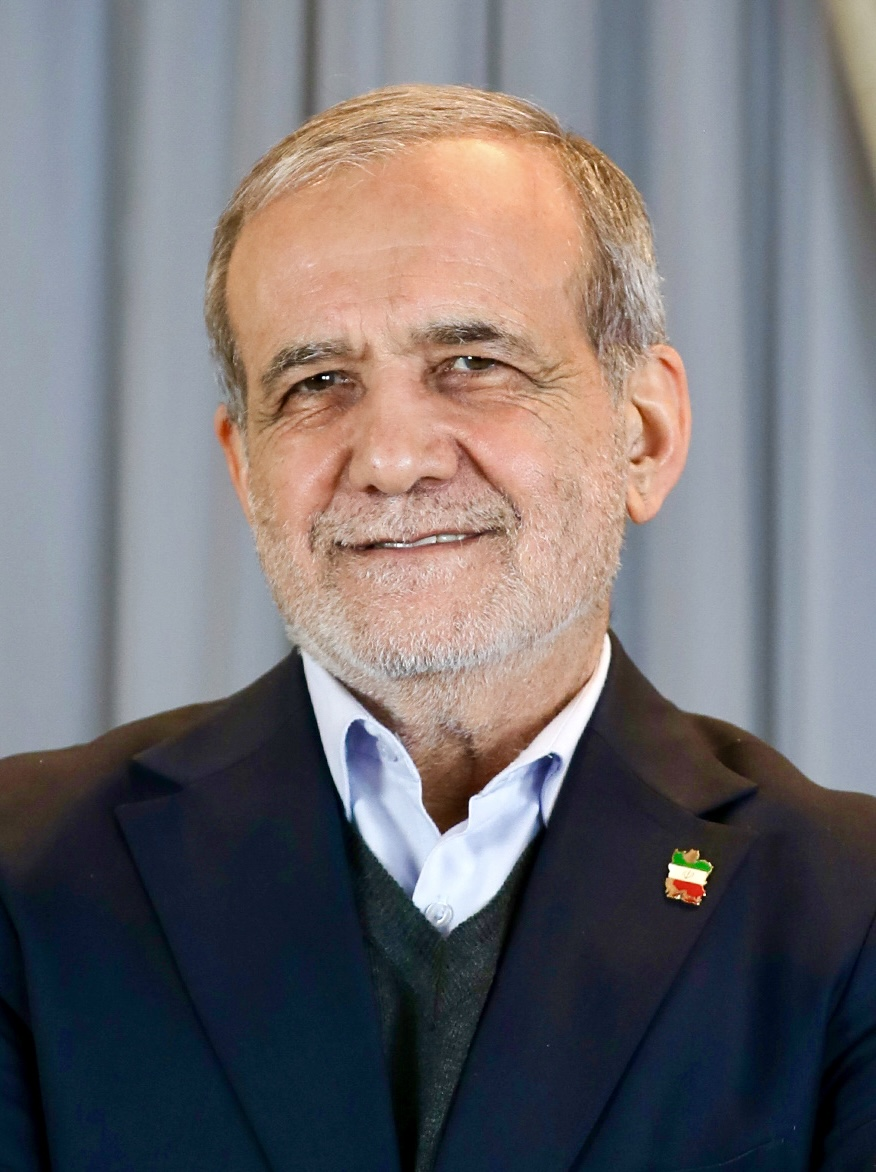
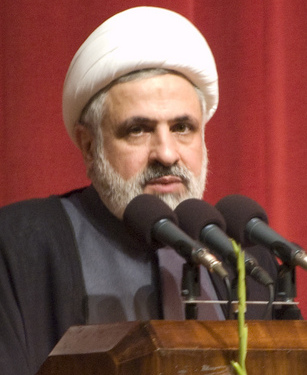
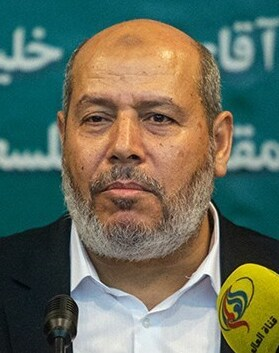
Current leaders of the Axis of Resistance, except the Chairman of Popular Mobilisation Commission Falih Al-Fayyadh: Mojtaba Khamenei, Masoud Pezeshkian, Naim Qassem and Khalil al-Hayya

Although Iran had been funding Shia militants since the Iran-Iraq War and the Lebanese Civil War (such as the War of Brothers), a complete network of Iranian proxies was not formed until the 2003 Iraq War led to the rise of Iran's influence. At first, the alliance consisted of the Assad-led Ba'athist Syria and Lebanese Hezbollah. Years later, Iran, already closely aligned with Syria and Hezbollah, would form stronger relations between the three, creating the axis. Iraqi and Yemeni militants coordinating with Iran came in as the newest members of this alliance. After the beginning of Russian involvement in the Syrian civil war, a slew of posters showing images of Hassan Nasrallah, Ali Khamenei, Syrian President Bashar al-Assad, and Russian President Vladimir Putin, have appeared with an Arabic caption meaning "men who bow to no one but God". The posters suggest another emerging regional Axis of Resistance, according to The Hill. This coalition has been described as "deeply polarising" for its sectarian targeting of Sunni Syrians. Hezbollah's actions have also arisen denunciation in Lebanon, most notably from Lebanese President Michel Suleiman, who demanded an end to unilateral armed maneuvers by Hezbollah. Grievance is also widespread amongst Lebanon's Sunni minority, who charge Hezbollah with engaging in sectarian violence against other Muslims, and of forfeiting its anti-Zionist stance. With Hezbollah's intensifying participation in the Syrian civil war following the years after 2013, the coalition has become explicitly Khomeinist and anti-Sunni; with the Assad regime becoming beholden and subservient to Iran and its proxies for continued existence. Alienated by sectarian policies, Sunni Islamists such as Muslim Brotherhood and Hamas began publicly opposing Iran and Hezbollah and have aligned closely with Turkey and Qatar, countries which are engaged in geo-political competition with Iran.

=== Middle Eastern crisis (2023–present) ===
The conflicts engulfing the Middle East in 2023, beginning with the October 7 attacks, have weakened the Axis of Resistance and the strategy behind it, according to an analysis by Associated Press. The network has suffered major blows in the Gaza war and the Israel–Hezbollah conflict. Additionally, the fall of the Assad regime in Syria, marked by rebel forces capturing Damascus and ending over five decades of Assad family rule, further disrupted the network. The Houthis and militias in Iraq remain intact as of December 2024. In April 2025 it was reported that Hezbollah has withdrawn the majority of its military infrastructure from southern Lebanon, transferring control to the Lebanese army. The report claims that 190 out of Hezbollah's 265 military positions were ceded to the army. This move aligns with the November 2024 U.S.-brokered ceasefire agreement, which mandates Hezbollah's repositioning north of the Litani River and the deployment of approximately 5,000 Lebanese troops to the south. The withdrawal aims to reduce tensions along the Israel–Lebanon border and facilitate the return of displaced civilians. While Hezbollah has removed heavy weaponry, some fighters from southern villages remain with light arms. The situation remains delicate, with ongoing monitoring by international observers to ensure compliance with the ceasefire terms.

In July 2025, reports emerged indicating that Iran has intensified its support for proxy groups, supplying advanced weaponry to both the Houthis in Yemen and Hezbollah in Lebanon, despite mounting regional and international pressure. According to U.S.-aligned forces in Yemen, a large shipment, estimated at 750 tons, of Iranian-supplied arms was intercepted in late June near Houthi-controlled territory. The cache reportedly included anti-ship and anti-aircraft missiles, drone components, warheads, and instruction manuals in Farsi, reinforcing long-standing assessments of Tehran’s direct involvement through the Islamic Revolutionary Guard Corps and affiliated networks. Simultaneously, Western intelligence suggests that Iran has resumed missile deliveries to Hezbollah via overland routes through Iraq and Syria, aiming to replenish the group's arsenal following its 2024 confrontation with Israel. Despite domestic economic and military constraints following the Twelve-Day War, Iran has prioritized rearming its regional allies.

During January 2026, the US began a military buildup in the Middle East, mainly because of the nationwide protests in Iran and ensuing massacres, a well as growing tension between Iran and the US, due to Iran's alleged ongoing push to develop nuclear weapons, rebuild its ballistic missile program, and its continued support of regional armed groups such as Hezbollah, Hamas, and the Houthis. This culminated in the joint American–Israeli war on Iran and its regional allies starting on 28 February, including the assassination of Iranian supreme leader Ali Khamenei. In July 2026, The New York Times reported that US President Donald Trump opted to fly back on the old Air Force One when leaving Turkey that month after credible threats from the "axis" targeting him and the Qatari-donated Air Force One, as it lacks the same advanced defensive abilities of the old Air Force One. White House press secretary Karoline Leavitt said that the new Qatari plane will undergo additional upgrades over the following month.

== Members ==
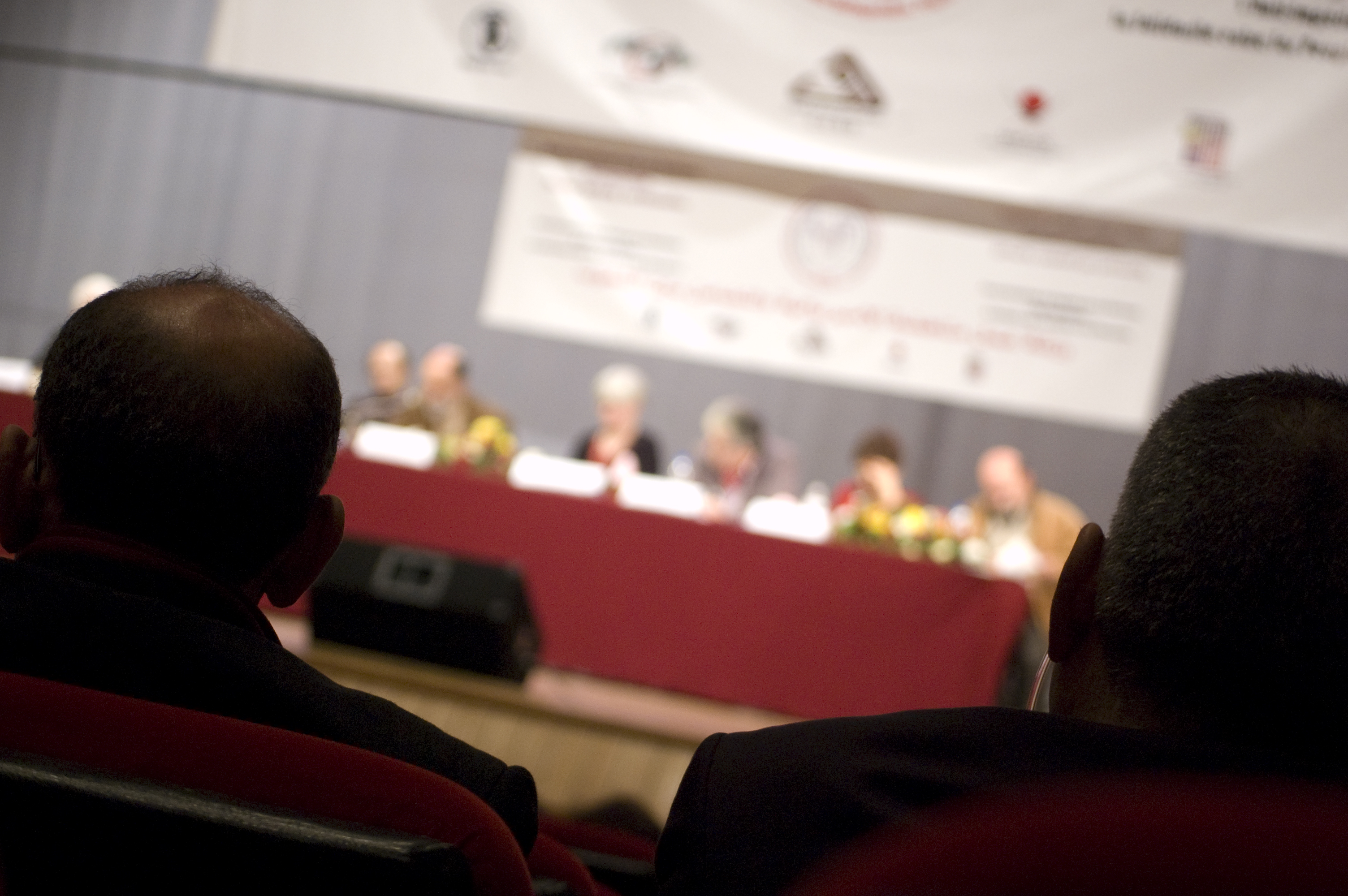
Forum for Resistance meeting in Lebanon, 2009

Hezbollah, a Shia Islamist group founded to fight Israel's invasion of Lebanon in 1982, is the network's most prominent member. Other significant participants include Hamas, Palestinian Islamic Jihad, the Yemenite Houthi movement, and several Shi'ite militias in Iraq and Syria. Until the fall of the Assad regime in 2024, Syria has been the only state member beside Iran, hosting fighters trained and recruited by Iran.

=== Iran ===
Ali Khamenei, who served as the Supreme Leader of Iran from 1989 until 2026, repeatedly defined the Islamic Republic government as a "resistance government" (i.e., against Western and Israeli influence). Qasem Soleimani played an important role in Iran's battle with ISIS in Iraq. He has been described as the focal point for bringing together Kurdish and Shia forces for the war against ISIS. Soleimani's achievements led to the creation of an axis of Shia influence throughout the Middle East centered on Iran. During a meeting with Cuban president Miguel Díaz-Canel in December 2023, Khamenei said that the political and economic potentials of Iran and Cuba should be used to form a coalition against the "bullying" of United States and its Western allies, in order to adopt a "common and effective position" on important global issues such as the Palestinian issue.

=== Hezbollah ===
Hezbollah was founded by Lebanese clerics to fight Israel's invasion of Lebanon in 1982. The group is an influential political actor in Lebanon, shares the Shiite Islam ideology of Iran. It has increased its attacks on Israeli targets on the Lebanon-Israel border almost daily since the start of Gaza war on October 7, 2023, in order to stop Israel from attacking Gaza, sparking the heaviest exchange of fire between the adversaries since full-scale war in 2006. Iran was Hezbollah's chief supplier of arms. In a direct reference to the axis of resistance, Hezbollah leader, Sheikh Naim Qassem, said in December 2024 that since the fall of the Assad regime, "Hezbollah has lost the military supply route through Syria at this stage, but this loss is a detail in the resistance's work." The group's Unit 3800 was responsible for training and providing strategic aid to militant groups in Iraq and Yemen.

=== Houthis ===
Abdul-Malik al-Houthi, the leader of the Houthis in Yemen, declared on 10 October 2023 that the organisation would retaliate by using missiles and drones in addition to other military measures if the United States got involved in the Gaza conflict.

On 19 October 2023, Yemen begun their missile and drone campaign against Israel in which the United States Navy destroyer USS Carney shot down three land-attack cruise missiles and several drones heading toward Israel. This was the first action by the Houthis in Yemen on Israel. It was later reported that the ship shot down four cruise missiles and 15 drones. Another missile was reportedly intercepted by Saudi Arabia. More were intercepted by Israel's Arrow anti-ballistic missiles; others fell short of their targets or were intercepted by the Israeli Air Force and the French Navy.

The Houthis then launched attacks on ships they claim are linked to Israel in a self-proclaimed bid to end the war, prompting a military response from a number of countries led by the United States.

=== Iraqi groups ===
Armed militias emerged in Iraq after the US invasion of the country in 2003. These groups became exponentially stronger when they organized as a collective front to counter the terrorist group ISIS.

Iranian officials claimed on 30 October 2023 that attacks against U.S. forces in Iraq and other parts of the region were the consequence of "wrong American policies", which included Washington's backing of Israel during the Gaza war.

Accounts on social media have claimed that Ya Ali Popular Formations is affiliated with the Popular Mobilization Forces, or the IRGC.

=== Syrian groups ===
According to Jubin Goodarzi, an assistant professor and researcher at Webster University, the Iranian–Ba'athist Syrian alliance that was formed in 1979 is of great importance to the emergence and continuity of the axis of resistance. Both countries are in key locations of the Middle East, and they have been affecting Middle Eastern politics during the past three decades. Also, the alliance is considered to be an enduring one, lasting 34 years "in spite of the many challenges that it has faced and periodic strains in the relationship". The axis has been described as altering "the strategic balance in the Middle East" by assisting Syrian leader Bashar al-Assad to remain in power and backing his war-crimes against Syrian civilians. According to Marisa Sullivan, the programme and aims of the Axis have three main pillars; shared regional objective in preserving the Assad regime, maintaining access to supplies of weapons and money from Iran, and stopping a Sunni-majority government from ever coming to power in Syria. The then-ruling Syrian Ba'ath party elites were primarily made up of Alawites, who are an offshoot sect of Shia, which is also the majority sect of Iran. This common background has made them strategic allies on various issues, including defense. The Syrian state-run news agency, SANA, has stated that the two governments discussed their "strategic cooperation relationship" and "attempts by some Western countries and their allies to strike at the axis of resistance by targeting Syria and supporting terrorism there". The alliance has been described as an "Axis of Terror" by the prime minister and ambassadors of Israel.

The fall of the Assad regime in 2024 was described by several Western media as a crippling blow to the Axis of Resistance: the collapse of the Ba'athist government in Syria undermining Iran's ability to supply Hezbollah. This was denied by Grand Ayatollah Ali Khamenei, who reiterated that the Axis will continue.

The Islamic Resistance Front in Syria is a militant organization established by the Syrian Social Nationalist Party (SSNP) in response to the fall of the Assad regime and the Israeli invasion of Syria in 2024. It is part of the Axis of Resistance.

=== Palestinian groups ===
Despite the Axis of Resistance being composed of primarily Shia Islamist factions, the Popular Front for the Liberation of Palestine, a secular Marxist–Leninist formation, is generally considered part of the Axis of Resistance, and receives support from Iran. The Sunni Palestinian Islamist movement Hamas has also at times been considered part of the axis due to its opposition to Israel and the United States. As of March 2012, the group has since pulled its headquarters out of Damascus and thrown its support behind the anti-Assad Syrian opposition. In October 2022, Hamas restored ties with Syria after reconciliation with the support of mediation by Iran.

== Funding ==
Via the Qods Force—a special forces unit of the Iranian Revolutionary Guard Corps—Iran has allocated substantial resources to strengthen each group's capabilities over decades. The funding of the Axis of Resistance directly impacts Iran's economy and the livelihoods of its civilians by diverting substantial financial resources away from critical domestic needs, and channeling them toward sustaining proxy groups and military engagements. The funding of the axis includes using money through oil revenues, taxes and state managed funds.

=== Assad regime in Syria ===
Iran had long envisioned establishing a dominant influence in Bashar al-Assad's Syria, leveraging the nation's reconstruction after the Syrian civil war that began in 2011. The fall of the Assad regime, however, marked a serious setback for Iran's ambitions in the Middle East. Tehran had long envisioned establishing a dominance. This act brought an end to years of investment and strategy.

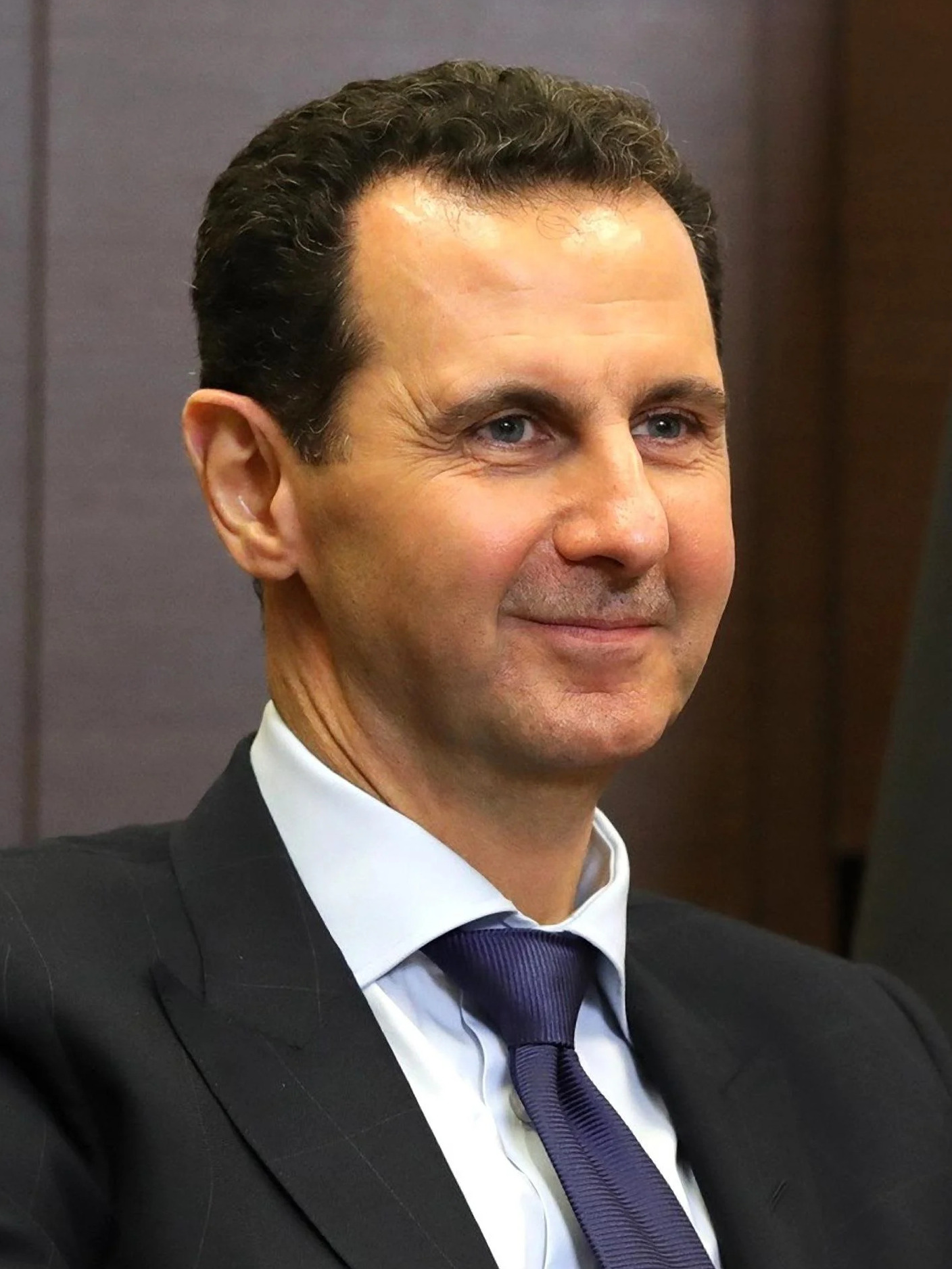
Bashar al-Assad, former Syrian autocrat of the Ba'ath Party

Iran's involvement in Syria has been marked by significant financial and military investment. During the Syrian civil war, Iran spent an estimated $50 billion supporting Assad's regime. Beyond direct financial and material support, Iran sought to entrench its influence in Syria through a series of economic agreements, particularly after 2017. These agreements often prioritized Iranian interests over Syrian sovereignty, granting Iran advantages in key sectors, including telecommunications, agriculture, and infrastructure. One agreement involved the construction of a strategic oil port on the Mediterranean Sea.

The financial toll of Iran's involvement in Syria has been immense. On December 7, 2024, former Iranian lawmaker Bahram Parsaei revealed that Syria's debt to Iran had exceeded $30 billion.

Since 2000, Iran has consistently expanded funding for proxy groups and military programs, while its civilian population has borne the economic burden. As military and proxy spending surged, especially post‑2011 sanctions, state revenues were redirected from public services and subsidies, resulting in inflation, rising unemployment, widespread poverty, and food insecurity. Iran's Ministry of Social Welfare reported that 57 percent of the population suffers from some degree of malnourishment, while 30 percent now live below the poverty line. The Iranian rial lost 46 percent of its value, making it the least valuable currency in the world.

=== Other groups ===
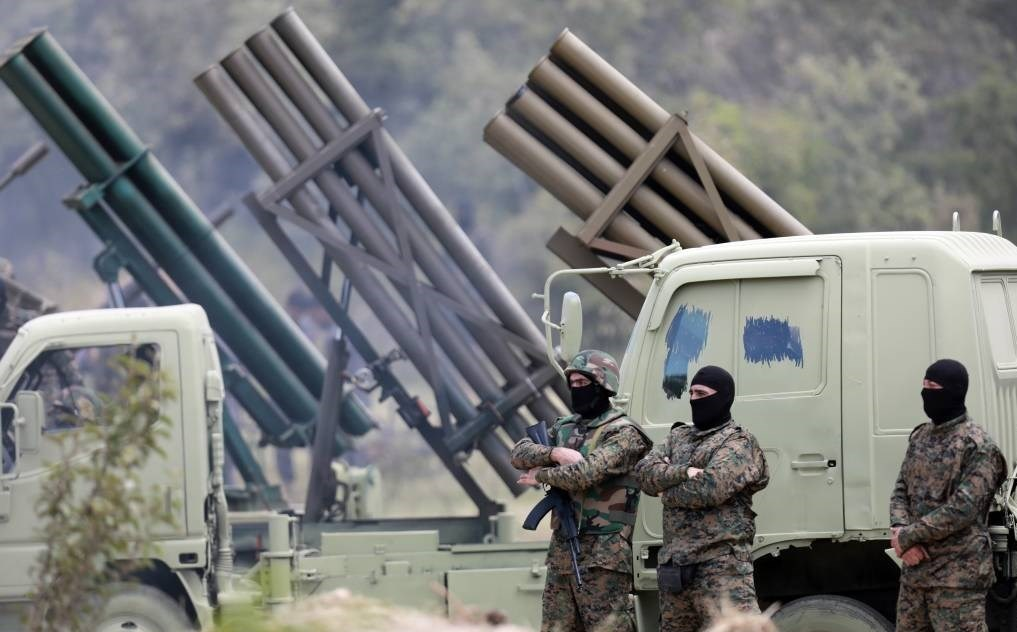
Hezbollah soldiers in a drill

Hezbollah, the Lebanese Shia militant group and political party, is among the primary beneficiaries of Iranian support. According to the US State Department, Iran is the primary source of the group's training, arms, and financial support, contributing hundreds of millions of dollars annually to the group. In 2018, US officials estimated Iran transfers $700 million to Hezbollah annually.

In Yemen, Iran backs the Houthi movement, providing them with weapons, training, and financial assistance.

Various Shia militias in Iraq, such as Kata'ib Hezbollah and Asa'ib Ahl al-Haq, receive funding, training, and arms, including unmanned aerial systems, from Iran.

Iran also contributes approximately $350 million per year to Palestinian militant organizations, including Hamas and Palestinian Islamic Jihad.

== List of members ==
Current members
Country	Group
Islamic Republic of Iran	Iranian Armed Forces; Islamic Republic of Iran Army; Ground Forces; Air Force; Navy; Air Defense Force; Islamic Revolutionary Guard Corps; Ground Forces; Aerospace Forces; Navy; Quds Force; Basij
Iraq	Certain Militias within the Popular Mobilization Forces; Badr Organization; Kata'ib Jund al-Imam; Kata'ib al-Imam Ali; Ya Ali Popular Formations (alleged); Islamic Resistance in Iraq: Asa'ib Ahl al-Haq; Kata'ib Hezbollah; Kata'ib Sayyid al-Shuhada; Harakat Hezbollah al-Nujaba; Harakat Ansar Allah al-Awfiya; Kataib Sarkhat al-Quds; Al-Thawriyyun; Within the Iraqi Parliament: State of Law Coalition; Fatah Alliance; Islamic Supreme Council of Iraq
Lebanon	Hezbollah; Amal Movement; Syrian Social Nationalist Party in Lebanon
Houthi Yemen	Houthis; (Yemen) Supreme Political Council
Palestine	Palestinian Joint Operations Room; Hamas; Al-Qassam Brigades; Palestinian Islamic Jihad; Al-Quds Brigades; (Popular Front for the Liberation of Palestine) PFLP; Abu Ali Mustafa Brigades; (Democratic Front for the Liberation of Palestine) DFLP; National Resistance Brigades; (Popular Resistance Committees) PRC; Al-Nasser Salah al-Deen Brigades; al-Aqsa Martyrs' Brigades; Palestinian Mujahideen Movement; Mujahideen Brigades; Palestinian Freedom Movement; Al-Ansar Brigades; (Popular Front for the Liberation of Palestine – General Command) PFLP–GC; Jihad Jibril Brigades
Bahrain	Al-Mukhtar Brigades; Al-Ashtar Brigades; Waad Allah Brigades
Syria	Syrian Social Nationalist Party; Eagles of the Whirlwind; Islamic Resistance Front in Syria; Syrian Popular Resistance; Military Council for the Liberation of Syria; Coastal Shield Brigade
Afghanistan	Hezbollah Afghanistan; Liwa Fatemiyoun
Azerbaijan	Islamic Resistance Movement of Azerbaijan
Pakistan	Liwa Zainebiyoun; Sipah-e-Muhammad Pakistan; Tehreek-e-Jafaria (Pakistan)
Jordan	Islamic Resistance in Jordan

Former members
Ba'athist Syria (until 2024)	Ba'ath Party; Syrian Arab Armed Forces (Ba'athist Syria); National Defence Forces; Baqir Brigade; Liwa Abu al-Fadhal al-Abbas; Quwat al-Ridha; Hashemiyoun
Palestine	Sabireen Movement

== Opponents ==
=== Israel and the United States ===
Because Iran lacks military superiority of the US and Israel, by cultivating an extensive network of proxy forces, Iran created a strategy designed to bog down adversaries outside its own borders. The 'Axis of Resistance' views Israel as a common adversary and calls for destruction of Israel. The axis claims to be against Israel in order to shore up popular support across the Islamic world. According to analyst Afshon Ostovar, the aim of this network is to present Israel with a long-term existential challenge by "slowly strangling" it through a series of "increasingly destructive, unwinnable wars." According to The New York Times, in the event of a major war with Israel, all member groups were expected to take part in a coordinated, region-wide military campaign with the shared goal of destroying Israel. Iran devised this strategy and has heavily invested in strengthening the combat capabilities of each group while fostering coordination among them. Despite the alliance members' differing ideologies and domestic interests, their activities serve the broader goal of complicating Israel's operations and making United States support for Israel costly. The Guardian pointed out that it "is a network of autonomous militant Islamist groups through which Iran can project power, determine the course of events and deter attack by Israel or the US".

As a result of the outbreak of the Gaza war on 7 October 2023, Hezbollah of Lebanon, the Yemeni Houthis, the Islamic Resistance in Iraq, and other factions in Syria have launched drone and missile attacks on Israel. Hezbollah launched its operations against Israel on 8 October 2023, whereas Yemen began launching its operations on 19 October 2023, and the Islamic Resistance of Iraq began launching its operations on 2 November 2023. In April 2024, Iran launched a missile and drone attack against Israel with its supporting factions in response to the Israeli airstrike on the Iranian embassy complex in Damascus.

The United States has given Israel extensive military aid and vetoed multiple UN Security Council ceasefire resolutions, concerning Gaza war. Groups of the Axis of Resistance have attacked American military bases in the Middle East. Additionally, the Yemeni Houthi movement have engaged in attacks in the Red Sea on commercial vessels allegedly linked to Israel, incurring a US-led military response. The United States designates most of the members of the axis of resistance as terrorist organizations.

According to the Middle East Monitor, the axis suffered a severe blow after the 2015 Israeli Mazraat Amal air strike. Three days before the airstrike against the Hezbollah convoy, Hezbollah leader, Hassan Nasrallah said: "We consider that any strike against Syria is a strike against the whole of the resistance axis, not just against Syria."

=== Islamic State ===
This axis became the main fighters against ISIS after the group took over almost a third of Iraq in 2014. According to the Los Angeles Times Amirli was the first city to successfully resist an ISIS offensive and was secured thanks to an unusual cooperation between Iraqi and Kurdish troops, Iranian-backed Shia militias and US warplanes. In 2012, Hezbollah deployed troops to support Syrian government forces against the FSA rebels, al-Qaeda and the Islamic State. In 2013, Iran began deploying troops to support the Syrian government against the rebels and other factions. In both instances, the Iraqi government provided support, even having volunteers joining the battlefields in Syria. Also, the Popular Mobilization Forces, which was established in 2014, became the main force in the fight against ISIS in Iraq. In 2014, Hezbollah rejected the idea of Lebanon helping in the US-led intervention in Iraq, against the Islamic State arguing that it may lead to the U.S. domination in the region or "substituting terrorism with flagrant US occupation". During the war against ISIS in Iraq and Syria, the Axis of Resistance became more united, forming the 4+1 coalition which was a joint military cooperation coalition with Iran, Iraq, Syria, Russia and Hezbollah of Lebanon.

The coalition supported one another in many battles in the Syrian civil war, such as in Hama Governorate, Palmyra, Aleppo and Idlib Governorate. The Russian Air Force has used Iranian airbases for refueling namely the Hamadan Airbase.

The IRGC Quds Force leader claimed: "the resistance of the Iraqi and Syrian governments and the perseverance of the armies and young men of these two countries ... played an important role in overturning this dangerous event … [I can announce] the termination of the rule of this vicious cursed entity, following the liberation operation of Abu Kamal, as the last fort of ISIS, bringing down the flag of this US-Zionist made terrorist group and raising the flag of Syria".

== Relationships with other countries ==
=== Relations with Afghanistan ===
Iran was accused of supporting the Taliban during the 2001–2021 war in Afghanistan. Ali Akbar Velayati and Hassan Kazemi Qomi claim that the Taliban-led Islamic Emirate of Afghanistan is also part of Iran's Axis of Resistance. However, Quds Force commander Esmail Qaani believes the Taliban government is "no friend of Iran".

== See also ==
- Axis of evil
- Axis of upheaval
- Axis of unity
- Arab–Israeli alliance
- Foreign involvement in the Syrian civil war
  - Russia–Syria–Iran–Iraq coalition, another military alliance that involves Iran and Syria
- Iran–Israel proxy conflict
  - Destruction of Israel in Iranian policy
  - Iran–Israel conflict during the Syrian civil war
- Iran–Saudi Arabia proxy conflict
- Involvement of foreign militias in the suppression of protests in Iran
- Shia Crescent
