= Daas Hassan Ali =

Syrian former military officer

- دعاس حسن علي
- Born: 1967 (age 58–59); Khuraybat al-Qalaa, Latakia, Syria
- Military career
- Allegiance: Ba'athist Syria; Military Council for the Liberation of Syria
- Branch: (Ba'athist Syria) General Security Directorate
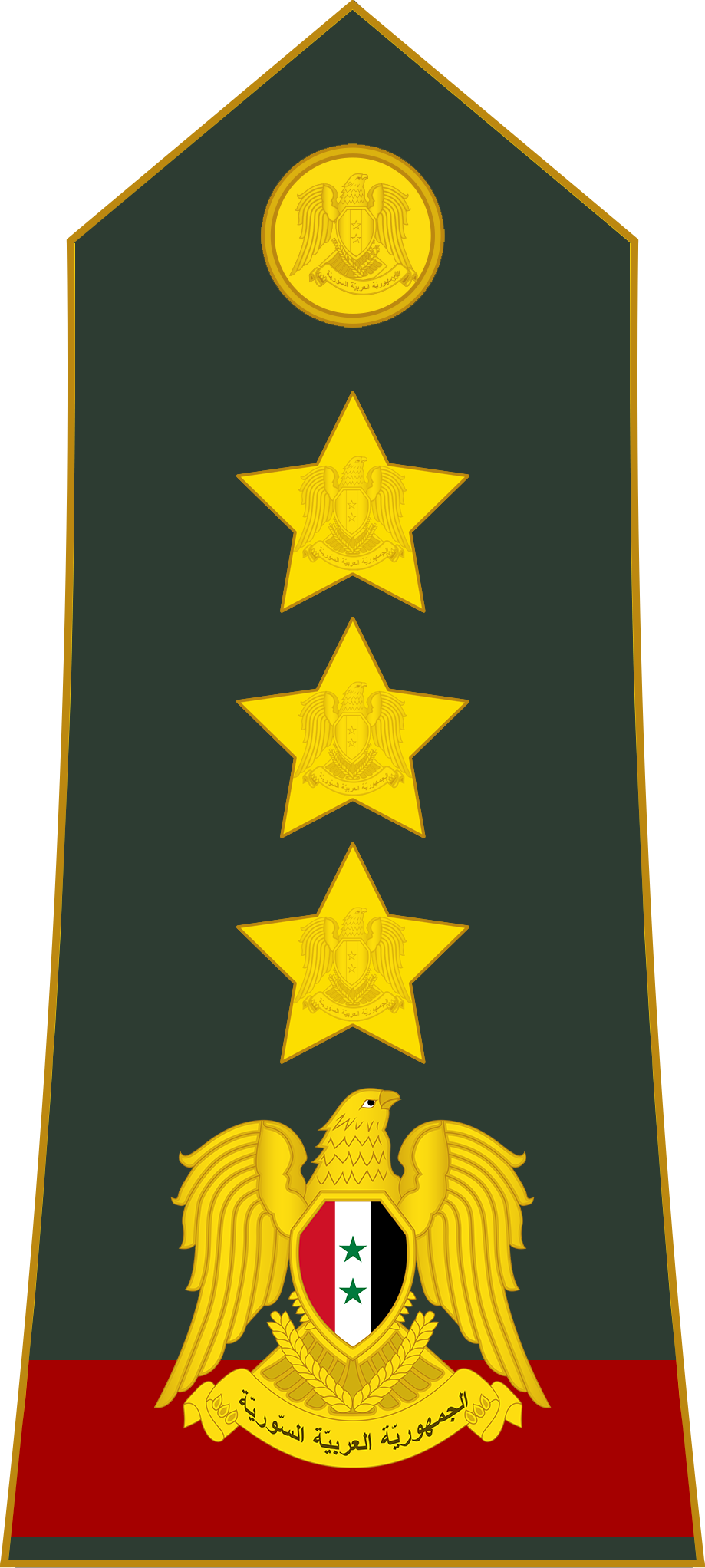
- Rank: Brigadier General
- Commands: Deir ez-Zor State Security Branch
- Conflicts: Syrian civil war; Deir ez-Zor Governorate campaign; Siege of Deir ez-Zor (2014–2017); Western Syria clashes (December 2024–present); Western Syria clashes (March 2025–present)

Daas Hassan Ali (Arabic: دعاس حسن علي) is a Syrian former Ba'athist brigadier general known for his role as director of the General Security Directorate in Deir ez-Zor, who was arrested in 2025 due to his role in coordinating the Western Syria clashes in Latakia.

== Biography ==
Ali was born in 1967 in the village of Khuraybat al-Qalaa in coastal Latakia to an Alawite family. Born and raised an Alawite from a military family, he joined the Syrian Arab Army at a young age eventually joining the elite Republican Guard. In the late 2000s the Syrian army underwent a series of reforms, including disbanding the 103rd brigade of the Republican Guard which Ali belonged to.

=== Intelligence general ===
After the 103rd was disbanded Ali was transferred to the General Security Directorate and received the patronage of Ali Mamlouk as one of his underlings. A steadfast and hard-line pro-Iranian Ba’athist he quickly rose in intelligence circles, reaching the rank of brigadier general due to his staunch support of the regime and was closely associated with major general Jameh Jameh, brigadier general Issam Zahreddine, major general Mohammad Khaddour, and brigadier general Mazen al-Kanj.

He was named the head of State Security in Deir ez-Zor in 2011, holding the position for nearly a decade until 2021, and was known even before the Syrian Revolution due to his brutal crackdowns on dissidents. Human rights groups and eyewitnesses accuse him of orchestrating mass arrests, interrogations, and torture of protesters in the early months of the uprising. Under his direct supervision, thousands of demonstrators were detained in 2011, and many reportedly perished under torture.

Throughout the 2010s Ali's post would be renewed far beyond what was typical for an intelligence officer due to his support for the government and for coordinating with Iranian militias and intelligence in the region. During the Syrian Civil War he coordinated spy rings among the protest movement and later within the ranks of the Free Syrian Army and Islamic State forces, which proved pivotal in lifting the Siege of Deir ez-Zor. Reports at this time also accused him of war profiteering and looting during the Deir ez-Zor campaign, seizing oil wells with forces loyal to him and siphoning their profits, as well as allegedly running a protection racket within Deir ez-Zor city. In 2021, partially due to his corruption, he would be 'retired' out of Ba'athist service, he was the longest serving provincial security chief in Ba'athist Syrian history.

=== Post regime collapse ===
As a prominent Assad-era security official – and an Alawite from Assad's home region – Ali fled to Latakia following the collapse of the Assad regime. At the same time Alawite and Ba'athist holdouts along the coast began to wage an insurgency, fearing reprisals due to the Assad government stuffing high-ranking military and government positions with Alawites, in response to this insurgency militias loyal to the new Syrian government performed reprisal killings which only stoked tensions. The Syrian government has accused Ali of using his experience in the intelligence community to coordinate these insurgents, namely with the Military Council for the Liberation of Syria formed by his close compatriot, brigadier general Ghiath Dalla, and that he was being moved from safehouse to safehouse by Alawite militias. On 18 June 2025, Syria's Ministry of Interior announced that Internal Security forces had captured Ali in a special operation in Latakia province and is awaiting legal proceedings for crimes against humanity during his time in Deir ez-Zor.
