= Miqdad Fatiha =

Syrian former Republican Guard officer

- مقداد فتيحة
- Born: 19 June 1989 (age 37); Jableh, Syria
- Military career
- Allegiance: Ba'athist Syria
- Branch: Syrian Arab Army
- Nickname: Abu Jaafar (Arabic: أبو جعفر)
- Units: Republican Guard; 25th Special Mission Forces Division
- Conflicts: Syrian civil war; 2024 Syrian opposition offensives; Battle of Aleppo (2024); 2024 Hama offensive; Western Syria clashes; March 2025 Western Syria clashes

Miqdad Louay Fatiha (Arabic: مقداد لؤي فتيحة, also transliterated as Muqdad Fatiha) is a former commander of the Republican Guard and head of the Coastal Shield Brigade, a "neo-Ba'athist" and Assadist insurgent group which operates in Latakia Governorate.

== Role during the Assad regime ==
Fatiha served in the Republican Guard as part of the 25th Special Mission Forces Division during the Syrian Civil War. He has been accused of committing various crimes, including drug trafficking, torture, kidnapping, bribery, and murder.

He appeared in recordings during battles in the civil war, such as during the Deterrence of Aggression offensives, where he commentated on the course of battles and justified Syrian Arab Armed Forces (SAAF) military retreats.

== Post-Assad ==
On 6 February 2025, he declared the formation of the Coastal Shield Brigade in a recording in the mountains of Latakia Governorate in response to violations committed against Alawites, during which he threatened to attack the transitional government inside and outside the coastal governorates, while also calling for Alawites to "take arms" against president Ahmed al-Sharaa and to resist disarmament. The Institute for the Study of War assessed that Fatiha had likely established the group "using resources and human networks developed under the Assad regime".

On 21 February, Fatiha announced in a video clip that the Coastal Shield Brigade, Islamic Resistance Front in Syria, and Ghosts of the Spirit of Resistance Forces, an eastern Syria-based organization led by Abdul Hamid al-Shamali, would be cooperating to fight against "takfiri terrorist organizations" and the Syrian government.

On 26 February 2025, during unrest and rioting in Qardaha, he made calls for disobedience, accompanied by some of his supporters, and was falsely attributed to have fled upon the arrival of military reinforcements in a video on social media.

Fatiha's Coastal Shield Brigade participated in the March Western Syria clashes against the transitional government, along with other loyalist militias like the Military Council for the Liberation of Syria, led by Ghiath Dalla.

A Syria TV report said that Fatiha has used former smuggling routes along the Lebanese border to move fighters and weapons into Syria, such as through Hakr al-Dahri.

He was sanctioned by the European Union on 23 June 2025 for his involvement in the Republican Guard and in establishing militias after the fall of the Assad regime. On 19 December 2025, he was sanctioned by the United Kingdom for his involvement in the March 2025 clashes and "historic violence committed during the Syrian Civil War".

== Personal life ==
He was born in Jableh, Latakia on 19 June 1989.

=== Bodybuilding ===
On 2 July 2021, Fatiha participated in the Aleppo Governorate Bodybuilding Championship for the "Classic" category (held in preparation for the Republic Bodybuilding Championship), placing 2nd in the 188 cm weight category.

On 6 July 2021, Fatiha participated in the Republic Bodybuilding Championship at the al-Fayhaa Sports Complex in Damascus on the al-Jaish football club, placing 1st in the 95 kg weight category.

On 2 October 2021, Fatiha participated in the Beach Master Bodybuilding Championship in the Assad City Sports Hall, Latakia, in which he placed 3rd in the 100+ kg weight category.
