= Saraya al-Jawad =

Militant organization in Syria

Rijal al-Nour, Saraya al-Jawad
- رجال النور، سرايا الجواد
- Other name: Rijal al-Nour
- Leader: Bashar Abdullah Abu Ruqayya † (2025—2026)
- Founded: 1 August 2025
- Dates active: 1 August 2025 – present
- Country: Syria
- Allegiance: Ba'athist Syria
- Headquarters: Jableh
- Active regions: Latakia Governorate
- Ideology: Assadism
- Wars: Syrian conflict (2024–present); Western Syria clashes

Rijal al-Nour, Saraya al-Jawad (Arabic: رجال النور، سرايا الجواد, lit. 'Men of Light, Al-Jawad Company') is a Syrian Assadist militant organization formed on 1 August 2025.

== History ==
The group was founded on 1 August 2025, in a statement commemorating Bashar al-Assad's "Syrian Arab Army Day".

The group released a video on 1 September that shows the group carrying out an IED attack on the Jableh against a vehicle belonging to the Ministry of Defense on 15 August 2025, where 5 militants participated in addition to declaring retaliation for the arrest of Sheikh Saleh al-Mansour.

The group claimed another IED attack on a Syrian government vehicle on 4 September, which the group claimed to have carried out in revenge for the assassination of Bashar Mihoub in Tartus, the video only shows an explosion, not the target or the location.

The group pledged to launch intensive military operations against Syrian leader Ahmed al-Sharaa and what it called "foreign mercenaries backed by Qatar and Turkey", describing it as "revenge for the souls of the martyrs". The group is considered a possible extension of a previous faction called the Coastal Shield Brigade.

On 29 September, Saraya al-Jawad detonated a roadside IED on a likely government position near Besayasin, Latakia Province and two other IEDs the next day. None of Saraya al-Jawad's IED attacks caused casualties. The group said that it conducted the attack in revenge for the killing of four Alawite construction workers in Jardin, Hama Province on 28 September.

On 24 December, the Syrian forces dismantled their headquarters in Jableh; commander Abdul Aziz Hilal al-Ahmad stated that the group was planning attacks for the New Year.

On 24 February, 2026, the Syrian government forces carried out a security operation with commander Abdul Aziz Hilal al-Ahmad stating it was carried out after several days of close surveillance and targeted two points in the Beit Alouni and Basniya areas. The leader of Saraya al-Jawad, Bashar Abdullah Abu Ruqayya, died in the operation.
