= Nahda (disambiguation) =

Nahda (Arabic: النهضة, lit. 'Renaissance'; sometimes represented as al-Nahda or Ennahda) is the Arab Renaissance in the 19th and 20th century.

Nahda or al-Nahda may also refer to:

== Politics ==
- Islamic Renaissance Movement, an Islamic political party in Algeria
- Renaissance Party (Egypt), an Islamic political party in Egypt
- Ennahda, an Islamic political party in Tunisia
- Nahdlatul Ulama, an Islamic organization in Indonesia

== Locations ==
- al-Nahda, Syria, a village in Hama Governorate, Syria
- Al Nahda, Dubai, a community in eastern Dubai
- Grand Ethiopian Renaissance Dam

== Sports ==
- al-Nahda Club (Oman), a multisport club in Oman
- al-Nahda Club (Saudi Arabia), an association football club in Saudi Arabia
- Al Nahda SC, a former association football club in Lebanon
- Nahda Club Barelias, an association football club in Lebanon
- Nahdat Berkane, a sports club in Morocco

== Education ==
- Al Nahda National Schools, a private school in Abu Dhabi
