= Mustafa Kneifati =

Syrian security official

- مصطفى كنيفاتي

Commander of General Security Service in Latakia
- Incumbent
- Assumed office 8 December 2024
- President: Ahmed al-Sharaa
- Preceded by: Major General Bassel Al-Sheker
- Nickname: Abu Othman

Military service
- Allegiance: Syria (2024–present)
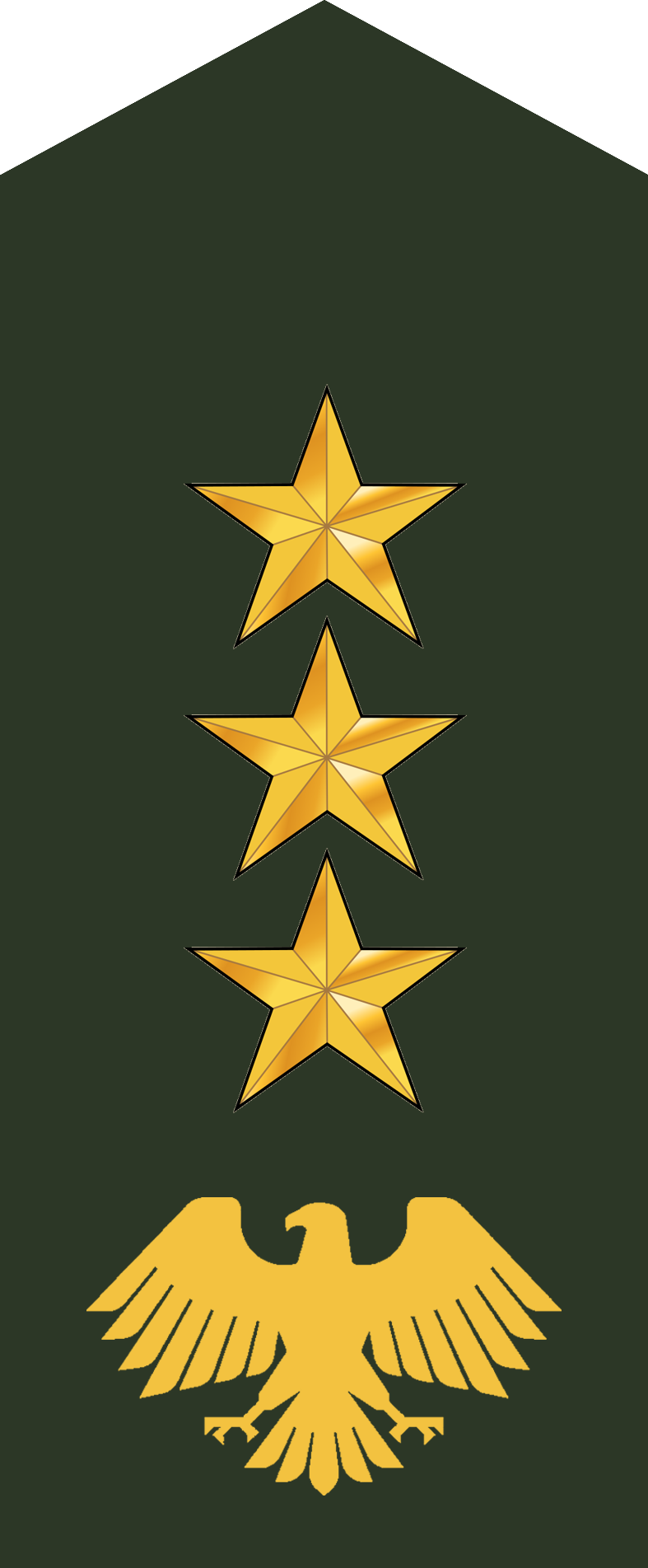
- Rank: Brigadier General
- Commands: (Syria) Syrian Special Mission Forces
- Battles/wars: Syrian civil war; Western Syria clashes; March 2025 Western Syria clashes

Mustafa Kneifati (Arabic: مصطفى كنيفاتي) is a Syrian security official in Latakia.

== Role in the Syrian transitional government ==
He declared that on December 25, 2024, a security campaign was launched in Latakia to pursue robbery and extortion gangs.

Knefati confirmed that Bassam Hussam al-Din, detonated explosives in an attempt to harm the captives during the raid on January 14, 2025.

He is the director of the General Security Department in Latakia, participating in a campaign in Qardaha and Jableh.

Kneifati is the Director of the Security Department in the Latakia Governorate, specifically Lieutenant Colonel.

On January 31, he revealed the arrest of Atef Najib, former head of the Political Security Division of the Daraa Governorate.

During March 2025 Western Syria clashes in Jableh, he stated that the attacks by remnants of Ba'athist Syria were "a well-planned and premeditated attack".

Ministry of Interior sources announced on May 14, 2025 the appointment of Lieutenant Colonel Mustafa Kneifati, "Abu Othman", as commander-in-chief of the ministry's special forces.
