= March 2025 Western Syria clashes =

2025 clashes in Syria

- Part of the Western Syria clashes and aftermath of the Syrian civil war
- Assadist insurgency in coastal regions.
Date	6–12 March 2025 (Note: The Syrian defense ministry stated on 10 March that the security operation was over. However, independent analysts such as the Institute for the Study of War disputed this.) (6 days)
Location	Latakia and Tartus governorates, Syria
Result	Syrian government victory; Initial uprising suppressed; Mass killings of Syrian Alawites; Former Ba'athist officers arrested or become fugitives

Belligerents
(Syria) Syrian caretaker government	(Ba'athist Syria) Assadist insurgents

Commanders and leaders
(Syria) Ahmed al-Sharaa (Syria) Murhaf Abu Qasra (Syria) Ali Noureddine al-Naasan (Syria) Anas Khattab (Syria) Mustafa Kneifati (Syria) Mohammed Othman (Syria) Ahmad al-Shami	(Ba'athist Syria) Suhayl al-Hasan; Munthir Wannus; Ghiath Dalla (Ba'athist Syria) Ibrahim Huweija (POW); Miqdad Fatiha (Ba'athist Syria) Daas Hassan Ali (POW)

Units involved
Syrian Armed Forces; Syrian Army; 62nd Division; 76th Division; 118th Division; Syrian Air Force; Ministry of Interior; (Syria) Internal Security Command; (Syria) Syrian National Army; Hamza Division; Sultan Suleiman Shah Division; Sultan Murad Division; Sultan Mehmed the Conqueror Brigade	Syrian Popular Resistance; Military Council for the Liberation of Syria; Coastal Shield Brigade

Strength
(Syria) Mi-24 attack helicopters	(Ba'athist Syria) + 5,000 insurgents (Latakia governor's claim)

Casualties and losses
(Syria) + 273 killed (per SOHR) (Syria) + 219 killed (per SNHR)	(Ba'athist Syria) 259 killed (per SOHR) (Ba'athist Syria) 1 detained
- 1,700 civilians killed (per SOHR); 823 civilians killed (SNHR estimate)

The March 2025 Western Syria clashes were a phase of the Western Syria clashes, which followed the fall of the Assad regime and end of the Syrian civil war. On 6 March, there was a "large and coordinated" ambush by Assad loyalist insurgents at the town of Jableh near the city of Latakia. The Syrian Armed Forces launched a counter-insurgency operation, which ended on 10 March. During and after this operation, over 1,000 Alawites were killed by government and allied forces in a series of massacres.

The insurgent assaults against the government forces, which were launched by Assadist militant groups loyal to Ba'athist military commanders Suhayl al-Hasan, Ghiath Dalla and Miqdad Fatiha, targeted government buildings, checkpoints, hospitals and medical facilities. On 6 March, Assadist insurgents briefly seized control of suburbs of Jableh, Baniyas and villages surrounding Assad family's hometown of Qardaha. Nearly 400 Syrian security personnel and dozens of civilians were killed in the attacks by pro-Assad insurgent groups across Western Syria.

Mustafa Kneifati, a security official in the Syrian caretaker government, described the assaults as "a well-planned and premeditated" onslaught launched by Assad regime remnants and stated that there were numerous killed and injured among government forces. Syrian government responded by sending re-inforcements to the coastal cities and announcing curfews in Latakia and Tartous regions. In the subsequent counter-insurgency operations, Syrian security forces expelled Assadist militants from the suburbs of Jableh, Baniyas and re-established control of major roadways in coastal region.

== Background ==
Following the fall of the Ba'athist government, the new Syrian government instituted a policy which fired thousands of Alawites through the dismantlement of Ba'athist security apparatus. The ranks of Ba'athist officers who led the 6 March uprising were thus swelled by disaffected Alawite youths who had lost their jobs due to these policies. Local communities thus saw the 6 March movement as 'a spontaneous decision of desperate people.'

After the implementation of a caretaker government under then-Hay'at Tahrir al-Sham emir Ahmed al-Sharaa, clashes arose between government forces and pro-Assad loyalist holdouts, particularly in regions with significant Alawite populations. Human rights organizations also reported numerous sectarian attacks targeting primarily Alawite civilians in the region, carried out by unidentified gunmen, resulting in hundreds of civilian casualties.

There were many fires in forested areas of Latakia province, with the caretaker government blaming seventeen on sabotage acts by "remnants" (rump state) of the Assad regime.

== Timeline ==
=== 6 March ===
On 6 March, armed remnants of the former Assad regime launched a series of coordinated attacks against security forces in the cities of Jableh, Baniyas and the surrounding areas. Insurgents overran several positions. According to SNHR, upwards of 75% of the city of Baniyas was captured by remnants of the former Assad regime in this assault. SOHR said that 48 people were killed in clashes in Jableh. At least 10 members of the security forces were captured by pro-Assad gunmen in Qardaha, according to Al-Araby Al-Jadeed. Latakia's provincial director said that an armed pro-Assad group, affiliated with Suhayl al-Hasan (nicknamed "The Tiger") and which included the newly-formed Military Council for the Liberation of Syria, conducted an attack in the city. Helicopters of the Syrian Air Force conducted airstrikes in the village of Beit Ana in response to this attack. Clashes in the village resulted in one security force member killed and two wounded. Alawite leaders called for peaceful protests in response to the air strikes.

At about 2 p.m., a co-ordinated series of attacks were carried out by the Assadist insurrection. There was an ambush in Jableh, near the city of Latakia, that killed at least 16 security personnel and four civilians, with dozens of fighters loyal to Assad killed or wounded in the clashes, in what SOHR called "the worst clashes since the fall of the regime".

To quell the rebellion, Syrian interim government authorities sent in reinforcements to western Syria. including tanks and armoured vehicles. The Syrian Minister of Defense mobilized government military forces to "break the back of the remnants of the regime and make them an example to anyone who dares to tamper with the country's security." Latakia's Director of Public Security mobilized a full security response to the province. The official Military Operations Management Telegram channel initially urged for popular participation in heading to coastal Syria to "support our brothers", before stating that additional support was no longer needed.

Thousands of fighters from Islamist groups, including pro-Turkish factions from the Free Syrian Army, arrived from Idlib, Aleppo, and Deir ez-Zor to coastal Syria with many local residents joining. Multiple videos recorded by armed men showed large convoys of militants moving towards Tartus and Latakia. A narrator in one video (which CNN was unable to geolocate) stated: "It was the battle for liberation. Now it's a battle for purification [of Syria]," while a man in military gear stated, "To the Alawites, we're coming to slaughter you and your fathers" and "we will show you the [strength] of the Sunnis."

According to SOHR, at least 35 pro-government fighters and 32 pro-Assad gunmen died in the violence, while four civilians were also killed.

The government said it had arrested regime loyalist General Ibrahim Huweija, chief of the Air Force Intelligence Directorate from 1987 to 2002 and suspect in the 1977 murder of Lebanese Druze leader Kamal Jumblatt.

=== 7 March ===
Though the Syrian caretaker government managed to retake certain areas, such as the Jableh Naval college, the city itself remained with a significant Assadist presence which continued to launch attacks against the government.

The Syrian Popular Resistance stated that it had taken control of numerous villages in Jabal al Alawiyin and expanded the scope of its operations to Masyaf in the Hama countryside.

Late in the day, President al-Sharaa made a statement on state television saying "When we compromise our ethics, we reduce ourselves to the same level as our enemy. The remnants of the fallen regime are looking for a provocation that will lead to violations behind which they can seek refuge."

=== 8 March ===
Syrian Network for Human Rights (SNHR) reported that 164 civilians were killed by armed militias supporting the Syrian government between 6 and 8 March. Assad loyalist groups killed 26 civilians and 121 police members of the Syrian General Security Service. UK-based Syrian Observatory for Human Rights (SOHR) said that Syrian security forces and pro-government fighters perpetrated the killing of more than 700 Alawite civilians across parts of the Latakia countryside in the previous days.

Dozens of civilians, former members of the Assad regime and their families fled to Russia's Khmeimim Air Base in Latakia province to seek refuge.

=== 10 March ===
On 10 March, the Syrian defense ministry announced the end of military operations in the Syrian coastal region.

=== 12 March ===
On 12 March 9 Syrian soldiers were killed in Barmaia by Assadist insurgents. These insurgents also attacked an interim government fuel truck convoy between Latakia and Baniyas.

Similarly, Assadist insurgents also attacked the gate of military barracks near Beit Yashout, Jableh District.

== Responses ==
Kuwait and Bahrain condemned "the crimes committed by outlaws in Syria and their targeting of security forces and state institutions". Following the massacres, protests erupted in Turkey against the Turkish government's support for the Syrian forces, who, according to the protesters, committed crimes against humanity.

In Iraq, the clashes inflamed sectarian conflict with a new Iraqi group known as "Ya Ali Popular Formations" announcing on 9 March that it would pursue and expel all Syrians who support the Syrian caretaker government.

On 10 March 2025, the Syrian Democratic Forces (SDF) signed the 10 March agreement with the Syrian caretaker government which includes supporting the Syrian government in its fight against "Assad regime remnants". The agreement also included a ceasefire that predicting halt both the massacres against Alawites and the clashes at the Qarah Qawzaq bridge and the Tishrin Dam.

== Analysis ==
The Institute for the Study of War found that even though most populated areas were secured, this did not indicate that the insurgency was defeated as cells in Tartous and Latakia's countryside are still present. It also found that the insurgents have a presence outside of the coastal provinces, with some insurgent pockets of resistance fighting in Hama too. ISW also argued that the capture of some pro-Assad military leaders would not affect the insurgency, as it is not under the control of any one group and there is no clear evidence that these commanders were involved in planning. For its 10 March report on the clashes, it reported that the government had failed to defeat the insurgency. Though there was a decline in insurgent activity, "insurgent cells have continued attacks on interim government forces while expanding attacks across Tartous Province. The decrease in rate of insurgent attacks during major counterinsurgent operations is more likely due to insurgents withdrawing from an area for the duration of the operation rather than a reflection of the operation's success in destroying cells. Furthermore, the ability of insurgent leaders like Coastal Shield Brigade's Miqdad Fatiha to freely travel across the coastal areas demonstrates that the insurgents do not feel troubled by government presence in the region.

Pro-government sources have tended to blame Alawites for the massacres perpetrated against them and some alleged the massacres against Alawites were "false flag attacks".

According to Aron Lund from the independent research foundation Century International, the "new al-Sharaa regime is weak and depends on security forces that are only partly under its control and that are full of anti-Alawite chauvinists." Lund told the AFP news agency: "Both sides feel like they're under attack, both sides have suffered horrific abuses at the hands of the other side, and both sides are armed."

The goal of the uprising was described by Hamza al-Ali, a GSS officer in al-Qadamous, as implementing an autonomous region along the coastal areas.
