= Syrian Popular Resistance =

Pro-Assadist militant group founded in 2024

- المقاومة الشعبية السورية
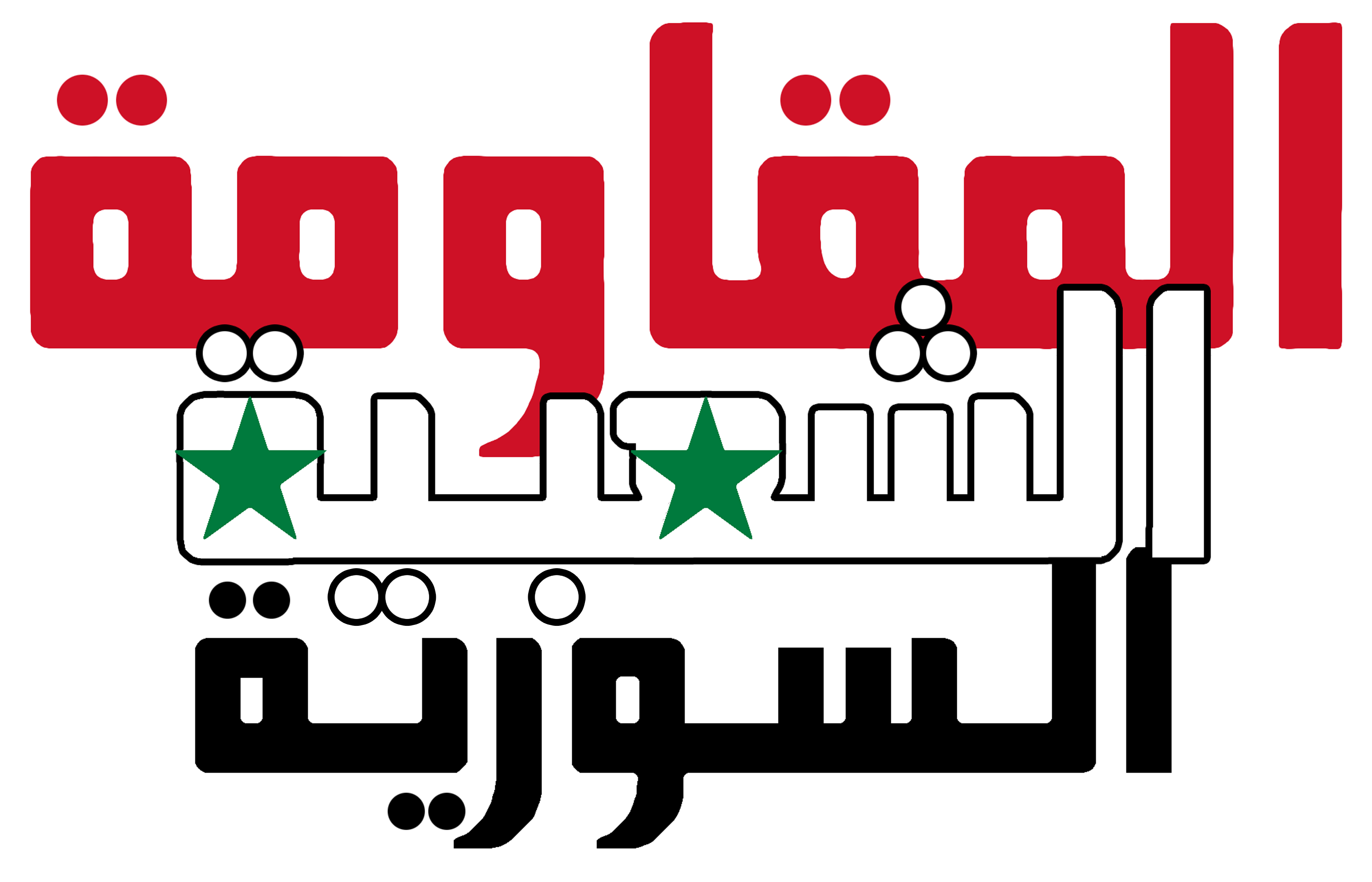
- Leader: Munthir Wannus (until 8 July 2025)
- Dates active: 29 December 2024 – present
- Country: Syria
- Allegiance: Ba'athist Syria
- Ideology: Assadism; Alawite sectarianism Anti-Wahhabism; Anti-Zionism; Anti-Americanism
- Wars: Syrian conflict (2024–present); Western Syria clashes; March 2025 Western Syria clashes; Israeli invasion of Syria; Hezbollah–Syria clashes (2024–present) (alleged)
- Website: https://t.me/syria_mukawama

Syrian Popular Resistance (Arabic: المقاومة الشعبية السورية, romanized: al-Muqāwama ash-Shaʻbīya as-Sūrīya) is an Assadist insurgent group engaging in an insurgency against the Syrian transitional government and also targeting Israeli forces.

== History ==
The Syrian Popular Resistance (SPR) was established in December 2024 following the fall of the government of Bashar al-Assad due to the 2024 Syrian opposition offensives. On 30 December 2024, they released a statement on stating that they vowed to kill the leaders of Hay'at Tahrir al-Sham (HTS), soldiers of the "Zionist state", America, and NATO. The group advocates violent opposition against the Syrian transitional government, and regularly espouses sectarian narratives through its telegram channel.

The Syrian Popular Resistance, through the help of Hezbollah, heavily solicit funds through various cryptocurrencies including Bitcoin and Ethereum.

The group portrayed its threats to attack HTS and HTS-affiliated leaders as part of its response against the extrajudicial killings of Christians, Shias, and Alawites after the fall of the Assad regime. The group also denounced the Syrian transitional government as heretical, by labelling the HTS-led coalition as "Kharijite" (extremists). ISW predicted that growing conflict between armed minority groups of this kind and HTS would increase sectarian tensions in Syria because the HTS would struggle to contain some of the more Salafi Jihadist and sectarian groups within its coalition. Iran may have attempted to exploit this sectarian violence aiming to destabilize the Syrian caretaker government. Two days after the formation of the group, Iran's Islamic Revolutionary Guard Corps (IRGC) released a statement advocating counter-revolutionary action in Syria. Iran has engaged in efforts to exploit sectarian conflict in Syria, as part of its attempts to reestablish a militia network in the region. SPR became a target from both Turkey and Turkish-backed militias, as well as the SDF.

SPR utilizes sleeper cells across Syria in order to perpetrate its attacks. On 4 February 2025, the Syrian Popular Resistance issued a statement calling it the "Final Statement" which urges for operations from all sects of Islam in Syria to fight against the new Syrian government if "they oppose Zionism, America, and Wahhabism".

In the aftermath of the Western Syria clashes, the Syrian Popular Resistance issued a statement on 19 August 2025, announcing plans to reform its structure. According to the group’s official telegram page, it intended to "form specialized units, organizing twenty-five groups carefully distributed across the west, east, north and south of the country". The group said these reforms were in order to "enter 2026 with a wider and more widespread structure".

=== Attacks ===
==== January 2025 ====
On 6 January, the Syrian Popular Resistance ambushed HTS units in Latakia.

On 10 January, the Syrian Popular Resistance attacked Hay'at Tahrir al-Sham personnel in the Talfita region in the countryside of the Rif Dimashq Governorate where a large number of people were killed and injured in the operation aimed at Hay'at Tahrir al-Sham.

On 13 January, the Syrian Popular Resistance claimed to have attacked and killed 35 Hay'at Tahrir al-Sham fighters in western Homs near the Lebanon–Syria border in coordination with fighters from Hermel, Lebanon, who may have affiliation with Hezbollah, with members of the interim government not giving any comment on the situation.

On 14 January, the Syrian Popular Resistance targeted Hay'at Tahrir al-Sham personnel in the Hamidiya police station in the Tartus Governorate with hand-made bombs in cooperation with Lebanese militant factions from the Beqaa Governorate and Hermel in the Baalbek-Hermel Governorate.

On 16 January, the Syrian Popular Resistance announced there would be more attacks against Hay'at Tahrir al-Sham and other affiliates.

On 22 January, the Syrian Popular Resistance attacked a checkpoint controlled by Hay'at Tahrir al-Sham which led to the death of 22 militants associated with Hay'at Tahrir al-Sham and injured several, including Ibrahim Abdulrahman Hajj, also known by the nom-de-guerre Ebu Mutaybin, who is one of the leading figures of Hay'at Tahrir al-Sham.

On 23 January, the Syrian Popular Resistance claimed responsibility through their Telegram channel for the assassination of the head of the Al-Sheykh Maskin police station in Daraa, Muhammad Khalid Al-Safadi (who also had associations to Hay'at Tahrir al-Sham), who was shot several times in response to, what they call, the "brutal massacres committed by these terrorist groups against innocent civilians in various Syrian regions".

On 25 January, members of the Syrian Popular Resistance assassinated a local leader of Hay'at Tahrir al-Sham, Ahmed al-Wazir Abu Akar, and wounding other men that were with him at the time of his death in the vicinity of the Dabousieh area in the Talkalakh District of Homs Governorate, and on the same day, Syrian Popular Resistance militants executed an ambush targeting a military vehicle belonging to Hay'at Tahrir al-Sham which resulted in several deaths and injuries of Hay'at Tahrir al-Sham militants, including a higher ranking militant by the name of Muhammad Abdul Qadir Khalil, also known by the nom-de-guerre Abu Abdo Talbiseh.

On 31 January, the Syrian Popular Resistance shot at Israeli military personnel in the city of Tirangah in the countryside of Quneitra, southern Syria, they targeted Israeli forces with heavy machine guns which they claimed resulted in the injury of multiple Israeli soldiers. They officially claimed responsibility on 1 February 2025 in a statement released on their Telegram channel, stating more attacks will continue, The IDF acknowledged the incident, but said that they had suffered no injuries. This would be the first time Israeli forces came under fire since their incursion.

==== February 2025 ====
On 1 February, the Syrian Popular Resistance claimed responsibility for an ambush on the Latakia-Aleppo highway near Al-Mukhtariyah in Latakia countryside, in which one member of Military Operations Command was killed, two others were injured and a fourth one went missing.

On 6 February, previous members of the 25th Special Forces of the Syrian Arab Army, led by Miqdad Fatiha, established the Coastal Shield Brigade under the Syrian Popular Resistance.

On 12 February, the Syrian Popular Resistance attacked a checkpoint belonging to HTS located in a former gas station in Tartous.

On 14 February, the Syrian Popular Resistance shot and killed 2 members of Hay'at Tahrir al-Sham in village of Al-Qabbou, west of the Syrian city of Homs though the Syrian Ministry of Defense and Security deny this claim. The two members were Mohammed Hamdi Alulu and Yahya Abdul Qader Kurdo from Idlib, they were kidnapped from Qalamoun where surveillance camera footage from a bakery on the victims' route showed that motorcycles were chasing the car they were driving, minutes before contact with them was lost. They were found in the towns of Hafir al-Fawqa and Hafir al-Tahta.

==== March 2025 ====
On 5 March 2025, the Director of the Public Security Department in Latakia Governorate, Major Mustafa Knefati, revealed in an official statement that a group of remnants of the defunct regime targeted two members of the Syrian Ministry of Defense through an armed ambush in the Al-Datour neighborhood in the city of Latakia, which led to their immediate death.

On 7 March, the Syrian Popular Resistance stated that it had taken control of numerous villages in Jabal al Alawiyin and expanded the scope of its operations to Masyaf in the Hama countryside.

On 13 March, the Syrian Ministry of Health announced that 150 people in Deir Qanun were poisoned, but they were all treated. On the 26th, the Syrian Popular Resistance announced its responsibility for the poisoning cases, claiming that a number of them were killed by arrows, and threatened to use more dangerous weapons until it takes control of Syria.

==== September 2025 ====
On 8 September, the Syrian Popular Resistance publishes footage of the execution of 2 Alawite citizens who were collaborators with government forces, as well as threatening other Alawites.

==== October 2025 ====
On 8 October, the Syrian Popular Resistance stated that it, with their allies, had carried out an attack against the Al-Shaddadi American base in south al-Hasakah, al-Hasakah Governorate, in northeastern Syria with unspecified weaponry.

==== November 2025 ====
On 12 November, the Syrian Popular Resistance claimed responsibility for a grenade attack by Ismaili Shias in a Syrian government headquarter in Salamiyah, Hama Governorate.

== See also ==
- Military Council for the Liberation of Syria - Assad loyalists also present in Western Syria
- Popular Resistance of the Eastern Region - Assad loyalists in Eastern Syria
- Army of the Men of the Naqshbandi Order - Iraqi Ba'athist analogue
- Popular Front for the Liberation of Libya - Gaddafi loyalist militia
- Suwayda Military Council - Syrian Druze military coalition against transitional government involvement
- National Resistance Front and Northern Alliance - Two Groups that both fought against the Taliban Regime and the top generals of these 2 groups have very similar names and belong to the same family
