= Al-Sabil =

Al-Sabil السبيل
- Village
- Location in Syria
- Coordinates: 35°0′23″N 37°6′35″E
- Country: Syria
- Governorate: Hama
- District: Salamiyah
- Subdistrict: Salamiyah

Population (2004)
  - Total: 1,958
- Time zone: UTC+3 (AST)
- City Qrya Pcode: C3214

Al-Sabil (Arabic: السبيل) is a Syrian village located in Salamiyah Subdistrict in Salamiyah District, Hama. According to the Syria Central Bureau of Statistics (CBS), al-Sabil had a population of 1,958 in the 2004 census.
