= Military Council for the Liberation of Syria =

Pro-Assad militant group founded in 2025

- المجلس العسكري لتحرير سوريا
- Leader: Ghiath Dalla
- Founded: 6 March 2025
- Dates active: 6 March 2025 – present
- Country: Syria
- Allegiance: Ba'athist Syria
- Active regions: Latakia Governorate; Tartus Governorate
- Ideology: Assadism
- Status: Active
- Wars: Syrian conflict (2024–present); Western Syria clashes; March 2025 Western Syria clashes

The Military Council for the Liberation of Syria (Arabic: المجلس العسكري لتحرير سوريا, romanized: al-Majlis al-'Askarīy li-Tahrīr Sūrīya) is an armed opposition coalition formed on 6 March 2025 by former Syrian Arab Armed Forces (SAAF) officer Ghiath Dalla and other former officers and loyalists of the fallen Assad regime.

The organization emerged following significantly heightened violence in Syria's coastal regions after the fall of the Assad regime and the establishment of the Syrian Transitional Government in December 2024.

== History ==
=== Formation ===
The council was officially announced through a distributed "Statement No. 1" accredited to Brigadier General Ghiath Dalla, a former Syrian Arab Army officer. Its formation coincided with armed confrontations between Syrian security forces loyal to Assad regime Syrian Army Colonel Suhayl al-Hasan in Latakia's countryside. The statement declared the organization's establishment following what was described as a "unified attack" against the General Security Service in Latakia Governorate, which reportedly resulted in more than sixteen fatalities among government personnel.

According to its inaugural statement, the Military Council for the Liberation of Syria articulated that its primary objectives were to "liberate all Syrian territory from all occupying terrorist forces" and to "overthrow the existing regime and dismantle its oppressive sectarian apparatus". The council publicly appealed to Syrian citizens across all sectarian, regional, and ethnic backgrounds to join their forces. The council also called upon the international community to provide support for "the will of the Syrian people" to "liberate themselves from injustice and tyranny disguised in vague terms."

=== Operations ===
==== March 2025 Latakia and Tartus clashes ====
In early March 2025, the military council's forces engaged in significant military confrontations with Syria's new security apparatus. Clashes began in Beit Ana, birthplace of Colonel Suhayl al-Hasan, after local residents obstructed attempts by security forces to arrest an individual wanted by the transitional government. Council forces confronted transitional government military planes and helicopters in the woodlands surrounding Beit Ana and Daliyah in Latakia's countryside.

On 6 March, the Naval College in Latakia was temporarily seized by the Coastal Shield Brigade, reportedly affiliated with the council, before government forces reclaimed control several hours later. Clashes were also reported around the Criminal Security Branch in Latakia and the al-Zira'a neighborhood in Latakia city. These military operations resulted in approximately 28 fatalities among Syrian security personnel. Seven additional security force members and four civilians were reportedly killed in the Beit Ana area during combat. On 10 March, clashes took place in Tartus.

== Relations ==
The Syrian transitional government characterized the Military Council for the Liberation of Syria activities as "part of a psychological warfare campaign" meant to mislead citizens while propagating civil chaos. The Syrian government insisted that its military forces were continuing to fight against the council's forces, stating that it would refuse to allow any parties to "turn back the clock". The government also implored Syrian citizens to ignore what it dubbed "false news" from the council and other parties, and insisted that they exclusively rely on official news sources to avoid fake claims.

On 18 June 2025, former intelligence brigadier general Daas Hassan Ali, was arrested for allegedly collaborating with and supplying intelligence to the Military Council for the Liberation of Syria, as Ali was a close compatriot of Dalla during their time in intelligence. The council had reportedly been moving Ali among safe-houses to prevent his arrest for some time prior to this.

== See also ==
- Syrian Popular Resistance - Syrian neo-Ba'athist analogue
- Popular Resistance of the Eastern Region - Assad loyalists in Eastern Syria
- Army of the Men of the Naqshbandi Order - Iraqi Ba'athist analogue
- Popular Front for the Liberation of Libya - Gaddafi loyalist militia
