= Al-Shajar =

Al-Shajar الشجر
- Village
- Location in Syria
- Coordinates: 35°23′23″N 36°18′27″E
- Country: Syria
- Governorate: Hama
- District: Suqaylabiyah
- Subdistrict: Suqaylabiyah

Population (2004)
  - Total: 941
- Time zone: UTC+3 (AST)
- City Qrya Pcode: C3126

Al-Shajar (Arabic: الشجر) is a Syrian village located in the Suqaylabiyah Subdistrict of the al-Suqaylabiyah District in Hama Governorate. According to the Syria Central Bureau of Statistics (CBS), al-Shajar had a population of 941 in the 2004 census.
