= Al-Nahda, Syria =

Nahda, Hama النهضة
- Village
- Location in Syria
- Coordinates: 35.001949°N 36.331174°E
- Country: Syria
- Governorate: Hama
- District: Masyaf District
- Subdistrict: Masyaf Nahiyah

Population (2004)
  - Total: 598
- Time zone: UTC+3 (AST)
- City Qrya Pcode: C3353

Nahda (Arabic: النهضة) is a Syrian village located in Masyaf Nahiyah in Masyaf District, Hama. According to the Syria Central Bureau of Statistics (CBS), Nahda, Hama had a population of 598 in the 2004 census.
