= Ghiath Dalla =

Syrian former military officer

- Native name: غياث دلا
- Nickname: أسد الغوطتين (Lion of the Ghoutas)
- Born: 31 July 1971 (age 54) Beit Yashout, Jableh, Syria
- Allegiance: Ba'athist Syria
- Branch: Syrian Arab Armed Forces (Ba'athist Syria)
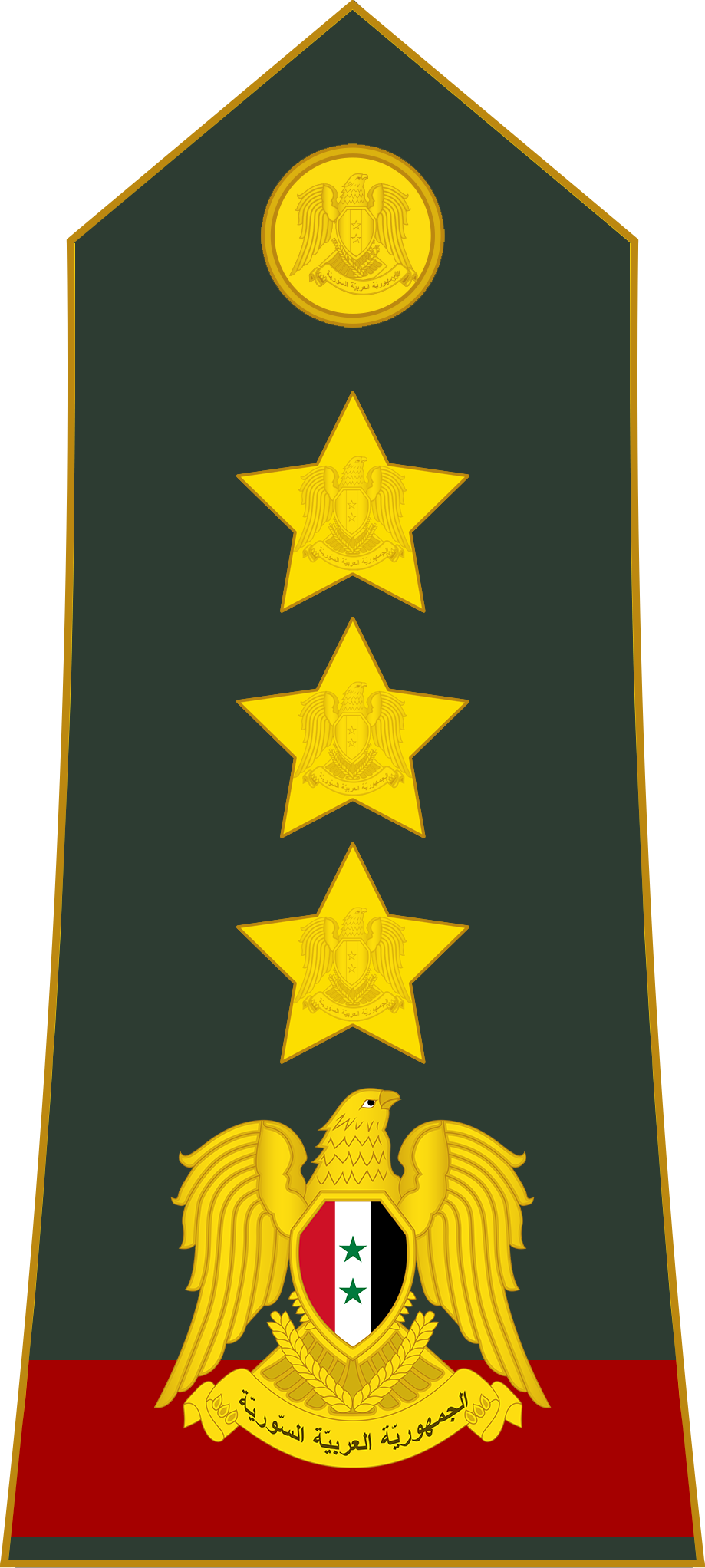
- Rank: Brigadier General
- Commands: 42nd Armored Brigade
- Conflicts: Syrian civil war; Darayya massacre; Siege of Darayya and Muadamiyat; Siege of Eastern Ghouta; Wadi Barada offensive (2016–2017); Qaboun offensive (2017); Daraa offensive (June 2017); 2017 Jobar offensive; Beit Jinn offensive; Battle of Harasta (2017–2018); Rif Dimashq offensive (February–April 2018); 2018 Southern Syria offensive; As-Suwayda offensive (August–November 2018); Northwestern Syria offensive (April–August 2019); 2021 Daraa offensive; 2024 Syrian opposition offensives; Battle of Aleppo (2024); 2024 Hama offensive; Western Syria clashes (December 2024–present); Western Syria clashes (March 2025–present)

Ghiath Suleiman Dalla (Arabic: غياث سليمان دلا) is a Syrian former military officer who served as chief of staff in the 4th Armoured Division of the Syrian Arab Army and is the head of the Military Council for the Liberation of Syria, an organization formed in March 2025 to combat the post-Assad government.

== Military service ==
He first served as an officer in the 4th Armoured Division.

=== During the Syrian civil war ===
==== Rif Dimashq campaign (2011-2018) ====
Ghiath Dalla participated in multiple campaigns across the western and eastern Ghouta regions in Rif Dimashq, which earned him the nickname "Lion of the Ghoutas" in pro-government media.

Dalla commanded the Ghaith Forces against rebel positions in Damascus's Qaboun, Barzeh, and Tishrin neighborhoods on 18 February 2017.

On 17 July 2017, Dalla was assigned to arrive at Jobar and Ein Tarma to assist the Republican Guard and other units in capturing opposition-held Jobar. He was supposed to have been present at the start of the Jobar offensive, but was postponed due to an increase in fighting in Daraa Governorate.

On 22 October 2017, Dalla and the Ghaith Forces arrived on the outskirts of Mount Hermon to prepare for an attack on opposition-held Beit Jinn, having been transferred there due to unsuccessful regime progress in the village and Maghar al-Mir. Additionally, unconfirmed reports claimed that Dalla was injured during clashes at the Tal Bardiyah mountain range four days later. After four months of fighting, rebels in Beit Jinn surrendered and were deported to other opposition-held regions in the ensuing settlement agreements.

Following the Beit Jinn offensive, Dalla and the Ghaith Forces were deployed to fight opposition fighters at Harasta alongside other pro-government units like the Republican Guard.

==== Southern Syrian campaign (2017–2018) ====
On 4 June 2017, following a rebel offensive against government positions in Daraa's Manshiyah district, Dalla arrived at Daraa Governorate from Rif Dimashq, accompanied by convoys of the Ghaith Forces, amidst regime reinforcements.

On 30 May 2018, Dalla and military reinforcements from the Republican Guard and 42nd Brigade were deployed to Quneitra Governorate after Iranian military personnel and Hezbollah fighters withdrew in accordance to an agreement between Russia and Israel.

==== Northwestern Syria offensive (2019) ====
During the Dawn of Idlib offensive, Dalla commanded the 42nd Brigade in the Assad regime's 8-month-long assault on Kabani in northeastern Latakia, held by rebel factions including Hay'at Tahrir al-Sham (HTS), the Turkistan Islamic Party (TIP), and the National Front for Liberation (NLF).

On 5 May 2019, Dalla, Major General Ali Mahmoud, and units from the Arab Nationalist Guard arrived at the Latakia Mountains in preparation for the campaign. Air Force Intelligence Directorate deputy commander Ghassan Ismail, who arrived at Salma on 15 May, aimed for the operation to include many pro-government units, such as the 25th Special Mission Forces Division, but Dalla refused assistance from forces who didn't share Iranian backing. The first unsuccessful assault on Kabani took place a day later, and Dalla arrived two days later with reinforcements from the 40th and 42nd brigades. The 4th Division continued launching assaults on the village until 29 December, after which it withdrew its units to Aleppo for "new victories" after achieving "the desired goals in Latakia".

==== Daraa governorate (2020–2023) ====
On 2 January 2020, Dalla was promoted from colonel to brigadier general.

In April 2020, Dalla was promoted to commander of the 42nd Brigade of the 4th Division.

On 28 May 2020, Dalla participated in a meeting with the Central Committees in Daraa alongside other military figures such as Hossam Louka and Louay al-Ali, agreeing to increase the 4th Division's military checkpoints. Three days later, Dalla and other 4th Division officers oversaw the deployment of Ghiath Forces soldiers in western Daraa countryside.

Dalla was sanctioned by the United States in 2020 for "leading Syrian military forces during indiscriminate attacks on civilians including chemical attacks".

On 29 June 2024, Dalla was promoted to chief of staff of the 4th Division.

==== Northwestern Syria offensive (2024) ====
On 30 November 2024, three days after the start of the HTS-led Deterrence of Aggression offensive, Dalla was reported by pro-government sources to have arrived at Aleppo.

On 1 December, after the fall of Aleppo, Dalla and the 42nd Brigade's infantry and Golan rocket launchers were deployed to Hama and Jabal Zayn al-Abidin during the Hama offensive. A few days later, the Military Operations Command announced via social media that they had attacked a meeting between security and military officials, including Dalla and Suhayl al-Hasan, using drone strikes.

== Post-Assad ==
He declared the formation of the Military Council for the Liberation of Syria in March 2025.

He was sanctioned by the European Union on 23 June 2025 for his role within the 4th Division and in establishing the Military Council for the Liberation of Syria upon the fall of the Assad regime. On 19 December 2025, he was sanctioned by the United Kingdom for his involvement in the March 2025 clashes and "historic violence committed during the Syrian Civil War".

Enab Baladi reported on 5 November 2025 that a local source spotted him at a restaurant in Lebanon, and that he moves about the area normally.

According to a December 2025 Al Jazeera Arabic report, a hacker who posed as a Mossad agent allegedly obtained recordings and documents where Dalla and Suhayl al-Hasan supposedly considered Israeli collaboration in operations against the Syrian transitional government.
