= Coastal Shield Brigade =

Assadist militant group founded in 2015

- لواء درع الساحل
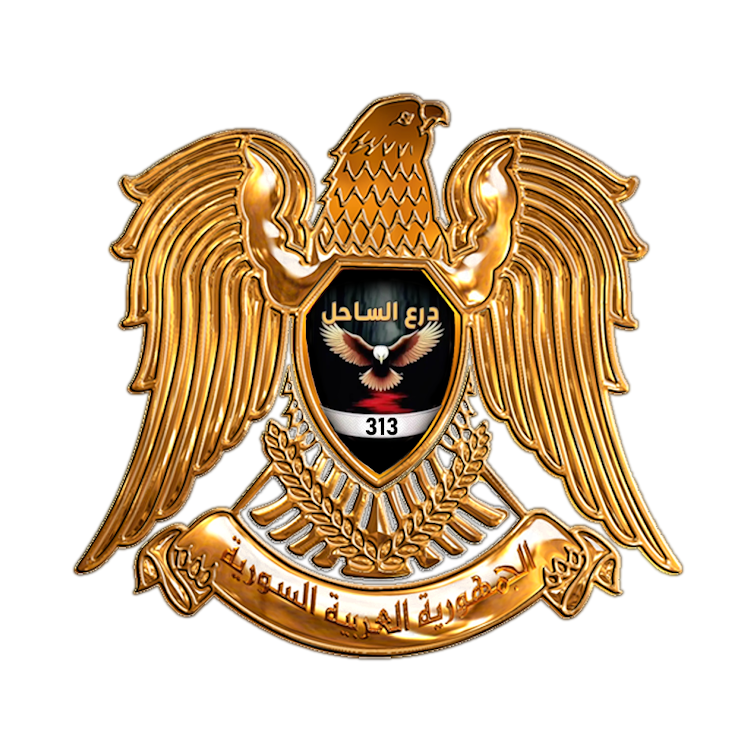
- Coastal Shield Brigade logo depicting the Hawk of Quraish
- Founding leader: Miqdad Fatiha and Hassan Fatiha
- Founded: 1 January 2015 (within the Syrian Arab Army); 6 February 2025 (as an insurgent cell)
- Country: Syria
- Allegiance: Ba'athist Syria; National Defence Forces
- Ideology: Assadism
- Wars: Syrian conflict (2024–present); Western Syria clashes; March 2025 Western Syria clashes

Coastal Shield Brigade (Arabic: لواء درع الساحل, romanized: Liwāʼ Dirʻ al-Sāḥil) is a Syrian Assadist militant organization formed in January 2015. The brigade resumed operations in February 2025, after the fall of the Assad regime.

== History ==
The group was officially founded on 1 January 2015, in Latakia province as a local militia for Republican Guard. The group started recruitment of soldiers in late May of the same year.

In 2025, after the fall of the Assad regime, the group published a video showing its establishment against the Military Operations Command and the Syrian Transitional Government which was spread by the Syrian Popular Resistance. They established the Coastal Brigade near the Latakia Mountains in the Latakia Governorate to fight against Hay'at Tahrir al-Sham (HTS) in their original stronghold. He also called for Alawites and previous supporters of Bashar al-Assad to "take arms" against HTS leader Ahmed al-Sharaa. Fatiha stated in the video about the Coastal Shield Brigade's establishment to the escalation of violations by Ahmad al-Sharaa's authority after the attacks on the Alawites in the cities of the Syrian coast, stressing the brigade's responsibility for any targeting of al-Sharaa's authority on the coast and outside the Syrian coast.

Fatiha stated the Coastal Shield Brigade would take responsibility for any operations done against Hay'at Tahrir al-Sham in the Latakia Governorate. According to Turkish media, Fatiha was notorious for his alleged involvement in drug trafficking, bribery, kidnapping and extrajudicial killings during the Assad regime. Fatiha likely used resources and human networks developed under the Assad regime to establish the Coastal Shield Brigade.
