= Iran–Saudi Arabia proxy war =

Indirect conflict between Iran and Saudi Arabia

- Part of the Iran–Israel proxy conflict and the Qatar–Saudi Arabia diplomatic conflict
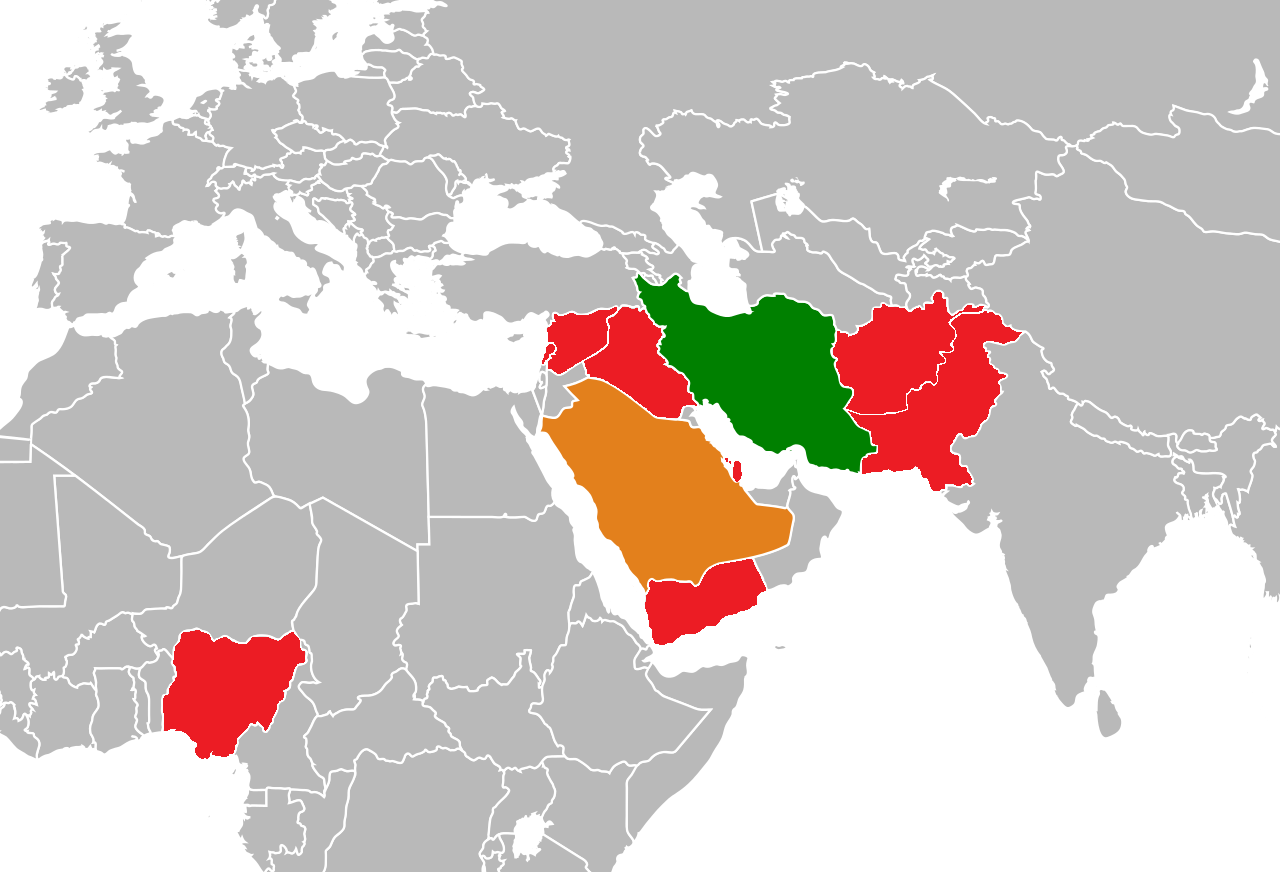
- Map of the current situation in the conflict: Iran Saudi Arabia Proxy conflict locations
Date	11 February 1979 – present (47 years, 9 months and 6 days)
Location	Various (primarily Middle East)
Status	Ongoing: Direct confrontation during the 2026 Iran war

Belligerents
Iran Proxies: Hezbollah Al-Hejaz; (Ba'athist Syria) Syrian Popular Resistance (since 2024); OIRAP (1979–1988); Liwa Fatemiyoun; Houthis; Syria (until 2024); Popular Mobilization Forces; Al-Ashtar Brigades; Al-Mukhtar Brigades; Hezbollah; Hamas (Note: Sometimes included in the "Axis of Resistance".); Muslim Brotherhood; Liwa Zainebiyoun; IMN; Waad Allah Brigades	Saudi Arabia Proxies: FSA (until 2017); Syria (since 2024); Jaish ul-Adl (until 2023); LNA; ASMLA; Yemen

Commanders and leaders
Mojtaba Khamenei (Supreme Leader of Iran); Masoud Pezeshkian (President of Iran) (Iraq) Nouri al-Maliki (Secretary-General of Islamic Dawa Party, Former Iraqi Prime Minister); Mohammad Ali Jafari (2007–19) (Commander of the Islamic Revolutionary Guard Corps) Former leaders: Ruhollah Khomeini # (1979–89); Ali Khamenei X (1989–2026); Mahmoud Ahmadinejad (2005–13); Hassan Rouhani (2013–21); Ebrahim Raisi (2021–24); Qasem Soleimani X (1998–2020); Abu Mahdi al-Muhandis X (2014–20); Bashar al-Assad (2000–2024); Hassan Nasrallah X (1992–2024)	King Salman (King of Saudi Arabia); Mohammed bin Salman (Crown Prince of Saudi Arabia and Prime Minister) Former leaders: King Khalid # (1979–82); Abdrabbuh Mansur Hadi (Former President of Yemen)

Iran and Saudi Arabia are engaged in a proxy war over influence in the Middle East and other regions of the Muslim world. The two countries have provided varying degrees of support to opposing sides in nearby conflicts, including the civil wars in Syria and Yemen; and disputes in Bahrain, Lebanon, Qatar, and Iraq. The struggle also extends to disputes or broader competition in other countries globally including in West, North, and East Africa; South, Central, and Southeast Asia; the Balkans, and the Caucasus.

In what has been described as a new cold war, the conflict is waged on multiple levels over geopolitical, economic, and sectarian influence in pursuit of regional hegemony. The rivalry has drawn comparisons to the dynamics of the Cold War era.

As of 2017, the rivalry is primarily a political and economic struggle exacerbated by religious differences, and sectarianism in the region is exploited by both countries for geopolitical purposes as part of a larger conflict. Iran sees itself as the leading Shia Muslim power, while Saudi Arabia is the leading Sunni Muslim power (see Shia–Sunni relations).

As of 10 March 2023, diplomatic relations between Iran and Saudi Arabia have been restored due to Chinese-brokered talks, which could have positive implications in the political climate of the Middle East. The deal was concluded after Iranian agreement to stop its military support for the Houthi militants in the Yemeni civil war.

As a result of the 2026 Iran war initiated by United States–Israeli surprise airstrikes on Iran, Iran attacked Saudi Arabia with direct strikes.

== Background ==
=== Arab–Iranian conflict ===
The Arab–Iranian conflict is a term which is used in reference to the modern conflict between Arab League countries and Iran. In a broader sense, the term is also used in reference to the historical ethnic tensions which have existed for centuries between Arabs and Persians as well as the historical religious sectarian conflict between Shia and Sunni Muslims, due to Saudi Arabia and post-revolutionary Iran seeing themselves as the champion leading states for Sunni Muslims and Shia Muslims, respectively.

Iran has very positive relations with numerous Arab countries such as Iraq, Syria, Lebanon, Algeria and Tunisia. Qatar also has established close working relations with Tehran, despite their disagreements over the Syrian civil war, with Iran and Turkey two of the non-Arab countries to support Qatar against Saudi Arabia and other Gulf countries in the Qatar diplomatic crisis which lasted for over two years. In this regard, the rivalry and tension is often seen as being between Iran and Persian Gulf Arab monarchies (all of which identify more with theocratic governance), such as the GCC states and their allies: namely Egypt, Sudan, Jordan and Morocco. The biggest rivalry in the Arab–Iranian conflict is between Saudi Arabia and Iran, who have been waging a heavy proxy war against each other since the late 1970s.

=== Iranian Revolution ===
The proxy conflict can be traced back to the Iranian Revolution in 1979, when the monarchic Imperial State of Iran became an Islamic republic. After the Islamic Revolution, proxies became key to Iran's national security strategy and its initiatives in the region. The revolutionaries called for the overthrow of monarchies and secular governments to be replaced with Islamic republics, much to the alarm of the region's Sunni-run Arab monarchies Saudi Arabia, Kuwait, the other Persian Gulf states, and Ba'athist Iraq (which was not a monarchy), most of whom were monarchies and all of whom had sizable Shia populations. Islamist insurgents rose in Saudi Arabia in 1979, Egypt and Bahrain in 1981, Syria in 1982, and Lebanon in 1983.

Prior to the Iranian Revolution, the two countries constituted the Nixon Doctrine's "twin pillar" policy in the Middle East. The monarchies, particularly Iran since the Pahlavi-coup in 1953, were allied with the US to ensure stability in the Gulf region and act as a bulwark against Soviet influence during the Arab Cold War between Saudi Arabia and Egypt under Gamal Abdel Nasser. The alliance acted as a moderating influence on Saudi-Iranian relations.

During this period Saudi Arabia styled itself as the leader of the Muslim world, basing its legitimacy in part on its control of the holy cities of Mecca and Medina. In 1962, it sponsored the inaugural General Islamic Conference in Mecca, at which a resolution was passed to create the Muslim World League. The organization is dedicated to spreading Islam and fostering Islamic solidarity under the Saudi purview, and has been successful in promoting Islam, particularly the conservative Wahhabi doctrine advocated by the Saudi government. Saudi Arabia also spearheaded the creation of the Organisation of Islamic Cooperation in 1969.

Saudi Arabia's image as the leader of the Muslim world was undermined in 1979 with the rise of Iran's new theocratic government under Ayatollah Khomeini, who challenged the legitimacy of the Al Saud dynasty and its authority as Custodian of the Two Holy Mosques. King Khalid initially congratulated Iran and stated that "Islamic solidarity" could be the basis of closer relations between the two countries, but relations worsened substantially over the next decade.

=== Qatif conflict ===
The direct trigger of the Qatif uprising following the 1979 Iranian Revolution was a mourning procession marking the Shia religious holiday of Ashura, which was prohibited to be celebrated publicly in Saudi Arabia. The ensuing marches and protests led to escalating tensions resulting in bloody clashes between demonstrators and the Saudi security forces over the next few days as the latter opened fire on the former. A sequence of protests followed in the next months, sometimes involving mass arrests and violence, but these mainly reflected local and community concerns like discrimination, exploitation, the absence of basic freedoms, and disappointment regarding failed promises of modernisation and development. The uprising was not a direct response to Ayatollah Khomeini's call for revolution, but was inspired by the Iranian Revolution. The Organization of the Islamic Revolution in the Arabic Peninsula (OIR or OIRAP), a regional activist organisation who had connections with Iran was involved in the events of the uprising. The organisation ran a radio station from Iran and had an office in Tehran. It encouraged Shia resistance and demands for the addressing of social and political concerns.

Throughout the 1980s, relations between the Shia and the state remained tense with hundreds of activists in exile as the Shia opposition relocated to Iran after 1979 in light of the then relevant conditions. The OIRAP focused on publishing, fundraising, and building a social movement in Saudi Arabia from Iran, with a non-violent but radical rhetoric, criticising and deeming the Saudi government illegitimate. Between 1982 and mid-1984, hundreds of OIRAP sympathisers were arrested mainly for the distribution of movement literature, the writing of graffiti, fundraising and attempts at large-scale mobilisation, until 1985 when a mass arrest dismantled its internal organisation in Saudi Arabia. The "hajj incident" of 1987 led to the exacerbation of tensions between Saudi Arabia and Iran and the OIRAP decided to shift its operations out of Iran to avoid getting caught up in the animosity. OIRAP refused to create a military wing and carry out attacks in Saudi Arabia against the state when the Islamic Revolutionary Guard Corps urged it to do so.

A new organization emerged in the wake of the hajj incident, the Hizbullah al-Hijaz, which was willing to ally with Iran and retaliate militarily. Its long-term political goal was the establishment of an Islamic republic in the Arabian Peninsula and advocated the overthrow of the Saudi government through violence, involving implicitly the separation of the Eastern Province of Saudi Arabia. The Hizbullah al-Hijaz was the military wing of the Khat al-Imam movement which referred to the followers of Imam Khomeini's line. The movement was initially religious, social and cultural in nature, but then became politicised. The relations between the two remain unclear. Hizbullah al-Hijaz took over OIRAP's role on the radical end of the spectrum of the Shia opposition in Saudi Arabia and its role in the Iranian propaganda effort against Saudi Arabia. The two distanced themselves from each other leading to the fragmentation of the Saudi Shia Islamist opposition. Hizubllah al-Hijaz perpetrated bombings in Saudi Arabia in response of the "hajj incident", which contributed to Saudi Arabia severing diplomatic relations with Iran on 26 April 1988. However, after 1989 the networks of Hizbullah al-Hijaz and Khat al-Imam inside Saudi Arabia were severely weakened through the arrests of many of its leaders.

Meanwhile, during the Gulf War OIRAP changed its name to Shia Reform Movement (RMS) and its strategy with it, shifting away from the Islamic and Shia discourse and moving towards pro-democracy and pro-human rights activism with government opposition concentrated in Qatif and the Eastern Province. Saudi Shia played an important role in the opposition but during the Gulf War the OIRAP remained loyal to Saudi Arabia. Rapprochement between the opposition and the government became possible after the death of Imam Khomeini and the end of the Gulf War, with diplomatic ties being restored between Iran and Saudi Arabia on 26 March 1991. Hizbullah al-Hijaz opposed the 1993 agreement between the mainly Shia opposition and the government, even when the government released Shia political prisoners and granted amnesty to those in exile, arguing that it would only support it if real gains for the Shia were achievable.The Khat al-Imam movement gained prominence briefly before the 1996 Khobar Towers bombings when some Shia became disillusioned with the agreement. After the attack on the Khobar Towers in 1996 a widespread mass arrest campaign was carried out imprisoning many of its members and individuals associated with it and members of the Hizbullah al-Hijaz, even when the organisation denied its involvement. However, it vowed to continue its struggle against the government and denounced the 1993 deal, even if most of its members were arrested.

Iran maintained its influence over Hizbullah al-Hijaz, but the mainstream of Saudi Shia distanced themselves from it once the Saudi government accepted the RMS as their representative. However, the political reforms and full recognition of Saudi Shia as Saudi citizens and their integration into the state did not get realized. Tensions in the Eastern Province had been building up for years and erupted during the 2011 Arab Spring, but remained confined to Qatif and the Eastern Province within Saudi Arabia. Shia representatives, leaders and notables, among them Khat al-Imam sided with the government and asked the population to stop the protests to preserve sectarian peace, which eventually happened. The protests were accompanied by arrests, violence and demanded democracy, Islam unity and the release of political prisoners. Loyalty of the Shia was questioned and the Saudi state blamed Iran.

=== Khuzestan conflict ===
Amid the Iranian Revolution and the ensuing political crisis, Khuzestani separatists in the city of Ahvaz saw a chance to achieve their goals but the new regime crushed this attempt. Initially the protests demanded the cessation of discrimination against Iranian Arabs and involved other long-standing grievances, but tensions escalated and one hundred Arabs died in the resulting riot. In April 2005 rioting and clashes between protesters and security forces erupted in Ahvaz once again. The reason for the uproar was the government's alleged intention to change Khuzestan's ethnic composition. The ASMLA (Arab Struggle Movement for the Liberation of Ahvaz) in Khuzestan is a Sunni Muslim separatist, ethno-nationalist terrorist organisation seeking to establish an Arab state within Iran, encouraging and engaging in armed struggle against the Iranian state with other similar organisations in the region. It was established covertly in 1999, and its existence was publicly announced in 2005. Its armed wing, the Mohiuddin Nasser Brigades carried out a series of attacks as a continuation of the 2005 protests in Ahvaz beginning on 12 June 2005 when they attacked public institutions and climaxing on 24 January 2006 when they carried out an attack on a bank in Ahvaz. ASMLA enjoys the financial support of, among other states, Saudi Arabia and positions itself specifically within the context of the Saudi-Iranian proxy conflict by emphasising its sectarian nature to gain sponsors from the Arab World. Saudi Arabia's involvement in its sponsoration is confirmed by the Danish authorities. Its leaders left Iran in 2006, reorganised in the European Union and continued carrying out terrorist attacks against the Iranian state, with attacks on the Islamic Revolutionary Guard Corps and Iran's oil infrastructure. They allegedly perpetrated a bombing in 2013 in Ahvaz, and their latest operation was attacking a military parade in 2018.

=== Iran–Iraq War ===
The Iran–Iraq War began on 22 September 1980, when Iraq under Saddam Hussein invaded Iran, and it ended on 20 August 1988, when Iran accepted the UN-brokered ceasefire. Iraq wanted to replace Iran as the dominant Persian Gulf state, and was worried the 1979 Iranian Revolution would lead Iraq's Shi'ite majority to rebel against the Ba'athist government. The war also followed a long history of border disputes, and Iraq planned to annex the oil-rich Khuzestan Province and the east bank of the Arvand Rud (Shatt al-Arab).

Hussein attempted to take advantage of revolutionary unrest in Iran and quell the revolution in its infancy. Fearing a possible revolutionary wave that could threaten Iraq's stability and embolden its Shia population, Iraq triggered the Iran–Iraq War which lasted for eight years and killed hundreds of thousands. Saddam had reportedly secured Saudi support for Iraq's war effort during an August 1980 visit he made to Saudi Arabia. This was in addition to financial and military support Iraq received from neighboring leaders in Saudi Arabia, Egypt, Kuwait, Jordan, Qatar, and the United Arab Emirates, in part to hedge Iranian power and prevent the spread of its revolution. In fact, Saudi Arabia, which considered the Islamic Revolution in Iran a threat to its interests, spared no effort to aid Saddam's anti-Iranian war.

Although Iraq hoped to take advantage of Iran's post-revolutionary chaos, it made limited progress and was quickly repelled; Iran regained virtually all lost territory by June 1982. For the next six years, Iran was on the offensive until near the end of the war.

American support for Iraq during the war had profound effects on Iran. The United States' defense of Saddam and its role in blocking investigations into Iraq's use of chemical weapons on Iranian soldiers and civilians convinced Iran to further pursue its own unconventional weapons program. The government has also used American hostility to justify foreign and domestic policies, including its nuclear program and crackdowns on internal dissent.

Apart from the Iran–Iraq War, Iran and Saudi Arabia engaged in tense competition elsewhere, supporting opposing armed groups in the Lebanese Civil War, the Soviet–Afghan War, and other conflicts. After the Cold War, Iran and Saudi Arabia continued to support different groups and organizations along sectarian lines such as in Afghanistan, Yemen, and Iraq.

After eight years, war-weariness, economic problems, decreased morale, repeated Iranian military failures, recent Iraqi successes, Iraqi use of weapons of mass destruction, lack of international sympathy, and increased U.S.–Iran military tension all led to a ceasefire brokered by the United Nations.

The conflict has been compared to World War I in terms of the tactics used, including large-scale trench warfare with barbed wire stretched across fortified defensive lines, manned machine gun posts, bayonet charges, Iranian human wave attacks, extensive use of chemical weapons by Iraq, and, later, deliberate attacks on civilian targets. A special feature of the war can be seen in the Iranian cult of the martyr which had been developed in the years before the revolution. The discourses on martyrdom formulated in the Iranian Shiite context led to the tactics of "human wave attacks" and thus had a lasting impact on the dynamics of the war.

=== 1987 Makkah incident ===
In response to the 1987 Makkah incident in which Shia pilgrims clashed with Saudi security forces during the Hajj, Khomeini stated: "These vile and ungodly Wahhabis, are like daggers which have always pierced the heart of the Muslims from the back. ... Mecca is in the hands of a band of heretics." Iran also called for the ouster of the Saudi government.

== Timeline ==
=== Arab Spring ===
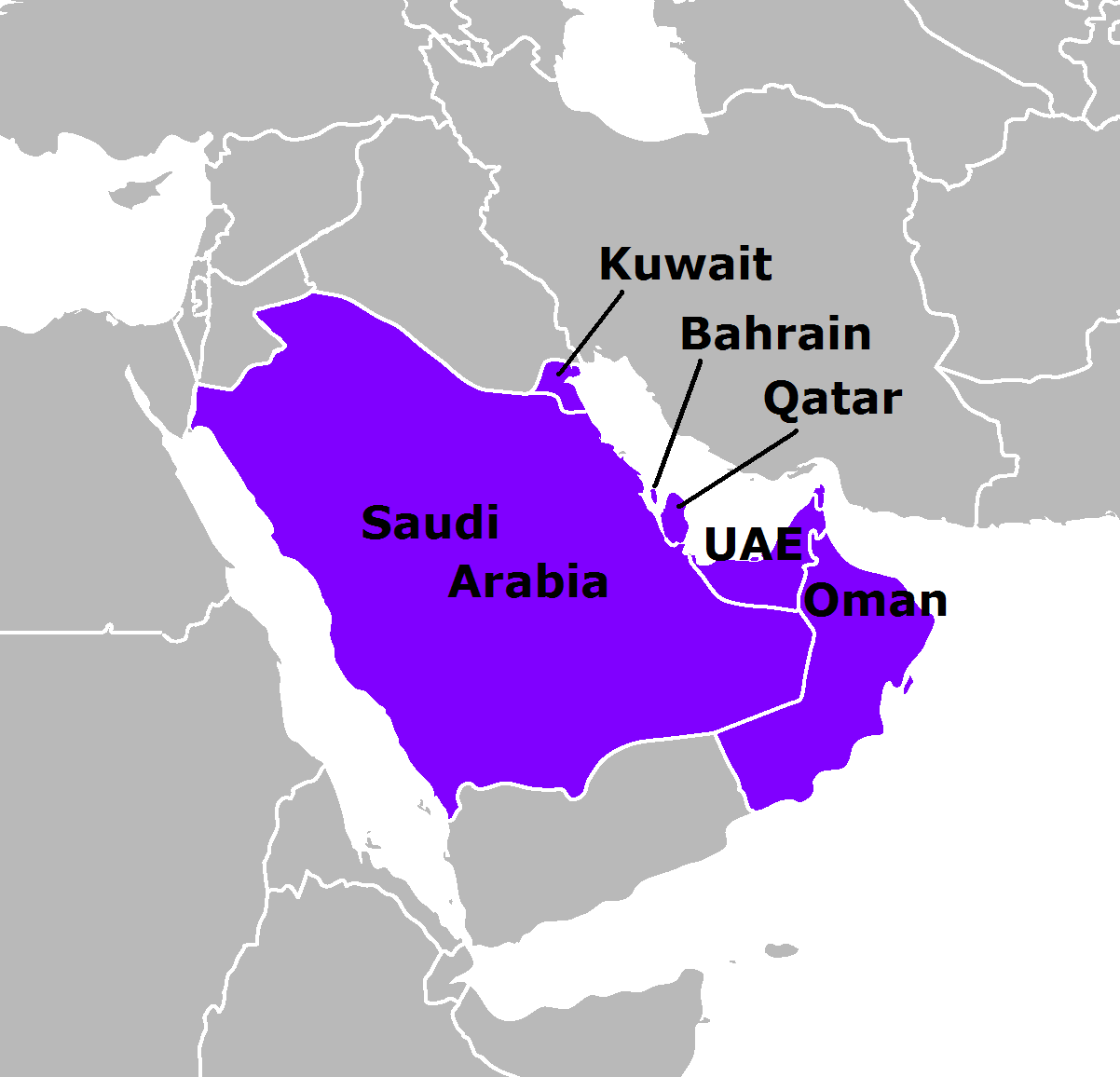
Member states of the Gulf Cooperation Council

The current phase of the conflict began in 2011 when the Arab Spring sparked a revolutionary wave across the Middle East and North Africa, leading to revolutions in Tunisia, Egypt, and Yemen, and the outbreak of civil war in Libya and Syria. The Arab Spring in 2011 destabilized three major regional actors, Iraq, Syria and Egypt, creating a power void.

These uprisings across the Arab world caused political instability throughout the region. In response, Saudi Arabia called for the formation of a Gulf Union to deepen ties among the member states of the Gulf Cooperation Council (GCC), a political and economic bloc founded in 1981. The proposal reflected the Saudi government's preoccupation with preventing potential uprisings by disenfranchised minorities in the Persian Gulf monarchies as well as its regional rivalry with Iran.

The union would have centralized Saudi influence in the region by giving it greater control over military, economic, and political matters affecting member states. With the exception of Bahrain, whose members rejected the proposed federation, as Oman, Qatar, Kuwait, and the United Arab Emirates were wary that it would lead to Saudi dominance.

=== Arab Winter ===
Saudi Arabia has become increasingly concerned about the United States' commitment as an ally and security guarantor. The American foreign policy pivot to Asia, its lessening reliance on Saudi oil, and the potential of rapprochement with Iran have all contributed to a more assertive Saudi foreign policy. In 2015 Saudi Arabia formed the intergovernmental Islamic Military Alliance to Fight Terrorism (IMAFT) in December 2015 with the stated goal of combating terrorism. The coalition currently comprises 41 member states, all of which are led by Sunni-dominated governments. Shia-led Iran, Iraq, and Syria are notably excluded, something which has drawn concerns that the initiative is part of the Saudi effort to isolate Iran. Due to the decreasing importance of the Israeli–Palestinian conflict as a wedge issue and mutual tensions with Iran, GCC states have sought strengthened economic and security cooperation with Israel, which is involved in its own proxy conflict with Iran.

The onset of the Arab Winter exacerbated Saudi concerns about Iran as well as its own internal stability. This prompted Riyadh to take greater action to maintain the status quo, particularly within Bahrain and other bordering states, with a new foreign policy described as a "21st century version of the Brezhnev Doctrine". Iran took the opposite approach in the hope of taking advantage of regional instability by expanding its presence in the Shia crescent and creating a land corridor of influence stretching from Iraq to Lebanon, done in part by supporting Shia militias in the war against ISIL.

While they all share concern over Iran, the Sunni Arab governments both within and outside of the GCC have long disagreed on political Islam. Saudi Arabia's Wahhabi religious establishment and its top-down bureaucracy differ from some of its allies such as Qatar, which promotes populist Sunni Islamist platforms similar to that of President Recep Tayyip Erdoğan in Turkey. Qatar has also drawn criticism from neighboring Sunni countries for its support of controversial transnational organizations like the Muslim Brotherhood, which as of 2015 is considered a terrorist organization by the governments of Bahrain, Egypt, Russia, Syria, Saudi Arabia, and the United Arab Emirates.

The United Arab Emirates, on the other hand, supports anti-Islamist forces in Libya, Egypt, Yemen and other countries, and is focused more on domestic issues, similar to Egypt under President Abdel Fattah el-Sisi. These differences make it unlikely that the Sunni world could unite against both Iran and terrorism, despite shared opposition. Since King Salman came to power in 2015, Saudi Arabia has increasingly moved from its traditional Wahhabist ideological approach to a nationalist one, and has adopted a more aggressive foreign policy.

The complex nature of economic and security concerns, ideological division, and intertwined alliances has also drawn comparisons to pre-World War I Europe. The conflict also shares similarities with the Arab Cold War between Egypt and Saudi Arabia in the 1950s and 1960s. Influence was judged by each state's ability to affect the affairs of neighboring countries, non-state actors played significant roles, and disunity in both camps led to tactical alliances between states on opposing sides.

==== 2015 Mina stampede ====
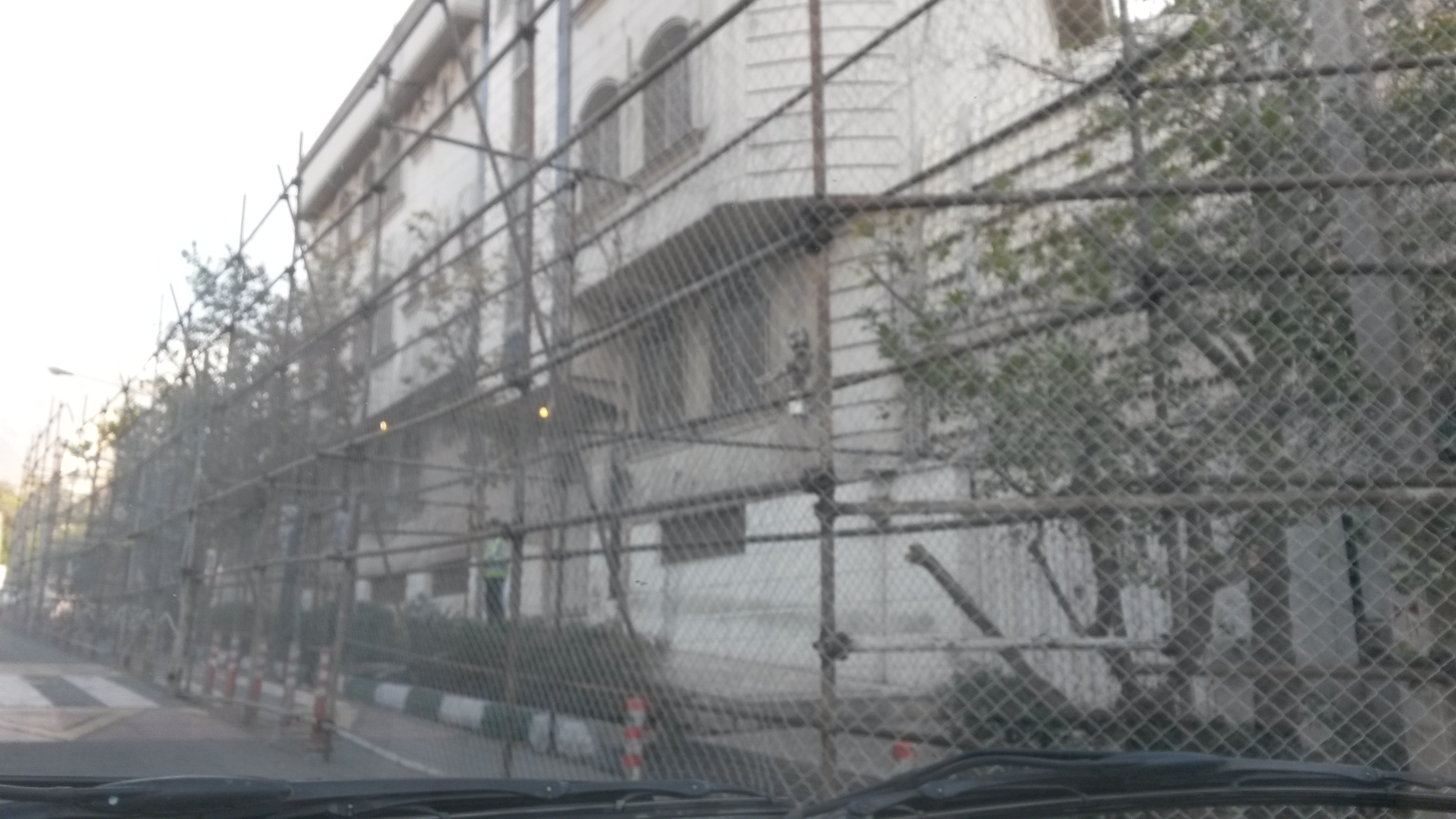
The embassy of Saudi Arabia in Tehran under Iranian police protection after the Mina stampede

The 2015 Mina stampede in Mecca during the annual Hajj further inflamed tensions. Tehran blamed the Saudi government for the tragedy and accused them of incompetence, which Riyadh rejected. In May 2016 Iran suspended participation in the upcoming Hajj. In September, Saudi Arabia launched a 24-hour Persian language satellite channel to broadcast the Hajj proceedings from 10 to 15 September. Ayatollah Khamenei accused Riyadh of politicizing the Hajj tragedy and argued that Saudi Arabia should not be running the pilgrimage.

==== 2016 Saudi executions and attack on Saudi mission in Iran ====
On 2 January 2016, 47 people were put to death in several Saudi cities, including prominent Shiite cleric Nimr al-Nimr. Protesters of the executions responded by demonstrating in Iran's capital, Tehran. That same day a few protesters would eventually ransack the Saudi Embassy in Tehran and later set it ablaze. Police donned riot gear and arrested 40 people during the incident. In response, Saudi Arabia, along with its allies, Bahrain, Sudan, Djibouti, Somalia, and the Comoros cut diplomatic ties with Iran. Iran's foreign ministry responded by saying the Saudis were using the incident as a pretext for fueling tensions.

Upon taking the throne in 2015, King Salman made significant changes in domestic policy in an effort to address growing unemployment and economic uncertainty. Such economic pressures further affected the regional dynamic in 2016. Russia, which had long maintained ties with Iran, also sought closer ties to Saudi Arabia. In September 2016, the two nations conducted informal talks about cooperating on oil production. Both had been heavily affected by the collapse of oil prices and considered the possibility of an OPEC freeze on oil output. As part of the talks, Russian President Vladimir Putin recommended an exemption for Iran, whose oil output had steadily increased following the lifting of international sanctions in January 2016. He stated that Iran deserved the opportunity to reach its pre-sanction levels of output. In what was seen as a significant compromise, Saudi Arabia offered to reduce its oil production if Iran capped its own output by the end of 2016.

Extremist movements throughout the Middle East have also become a major division between Iran and Saudi Arabia. During the Cold War, Saudi Arabia funded extremist militants in part to bolster resistance to the Soviet Union at the behest of the United States, and later to combat Shia movements supported by Iran. The support had the unintended effect of metastasizing extremism throughout the region. The Saudi government now considers extremist groups like ISIL and the Al-Nusra Front to be one of the two major threats to the kingdom and its monarchy, the other being Iran.

In a New York Times op-ed, Iranian Foreign Minister Mohammad Javad Zarif agreed that terrorism was an international threat and called on the United Nations to block funding of extremist ideologies using Iran's WAVE initiative as a framework. However, he placed the blame on Saudi Arabia and its sponsorship of Wahhabism for instability in the Middle East. He argued that Wahhabism was the fundamental ideology shared among terrorist groups in the Middle East, and that it has been "devastating in its impact". He went so far as to proclaim "Let us rid the world of Wahhabism" and asserted that, despite arguments otherwise, Wahhabism was the true cause of the Iran–Saudi Arabia rivalry.

The election of Donald Trump in the United States in 2016 prompted uncertainty from both countries about future US policy in the Middle East, as both were targets of criticism during his campaign. The Saudi government anticipated that the Trump administration would adopt a more hawkish stance than the Obama administration on Iran, which would potentially benefit Riyadh. Iran feared the return of economic isolation, and President Hassan Rouhani made efforts to establish further international economic participation for the country by signing oil deals with Western companies before Trump took office.

==== 2017 ====
In May 2017, President Trump declared a shift in US foreign policy toward favoring Saudi Arabia at Iran's expense, marking a departure from President Obama's more reconciliatory approach. This move came days after the re-election of Rouhani in Iran, who defeated conservative candidate Ebrahim Raisi. Rouhani's victory was seen as a popular mandate for liberal reforms in the country.

Several incidents in mid-2017 further heightened tensions. In May 2017, Saudi forces laid siege on Al-Awamiyah, the home of Nimr al-Nimr, in a clash with Shia militants. Dozens of Shia civilians were reportedly killed. Residents are not allowed to enter or leave, and military indiscriminately shells the neighborhoods with artillery fire and snipers are reportedly shooting residents.

In June, the Iranian state-owned news agency Press TV reported that the president of a Quran council and two cousins of executed Nimr al-Nimr were killed by Saudi security forces in Qatif. During the subsequent crackdown the Saudi government demolished several historical sites and many other buildings and houses in Qatif. On 17 June, Iran announced that the Saudi coast guard had killed an Iranian fisherman. Soon after, Saudi authorities captured three Iranian citizens who they claimed were IRGC members plotting a terrorist attack on an offshore Saudi oilfield. Iran denied the claim, saying that those captured are regular fishermen and demanding their immediate release.

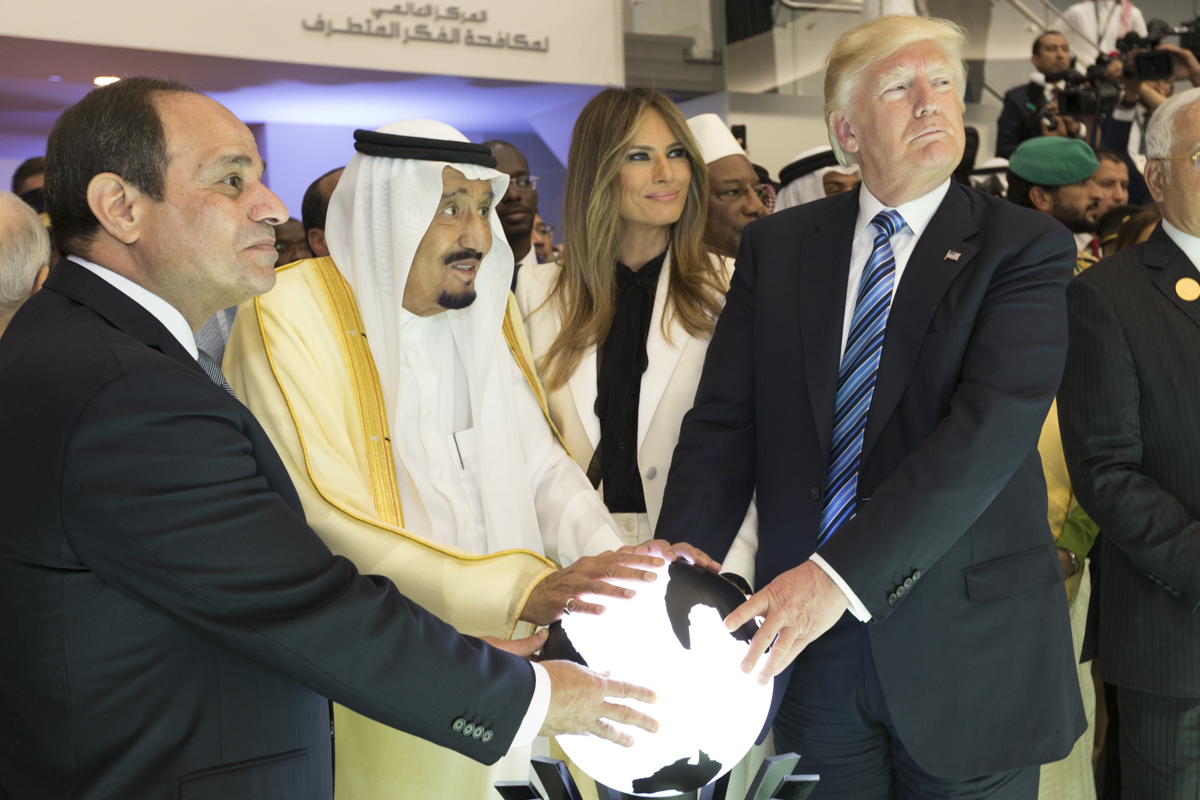
Salman of Saudi Arabia, US President Trump, and Egyptian President Abdel Fattah el-Sisi at the 2017 Riyadh summit.

In the wake of the June 2017 Tehran attacks committed by ISIL militants, the Iranian Revolutionary Guard Corps issued a statement blaming Saudi Arabia, while Saudi Foreign Minister Adel al-Jubeir said there was no evidence that Saudis were involved. Later Iranian official Hossein Amir-Abdollahian stated that Saudi Arabia is the prime suspect behind the Tehran attacks. The commander of IRGC, Major General Mohammad Ali Jafari, claimed that Iran has intelligence proving Saudi Arabia's, Israel's, and the United States' involvement in the Tehran attack. Iran's Supreme Leader Ayatollah Khamenei later accused the United States of creating ISIL and of joining Saudi Arabia in funding and directing ISIL in addition to other terrorist organizations.

In October 2017, the government of Switzerland announced an agreement in which it would represent Saudi interests in Iran and Iranian interests in Saudi Arabia. The two countries had severed relations in January 2016.

Several major developments occurring in November 2017 drew concerns that that proxy conflict might escalate into a direct military confrontation between Iran and Saudi Arabia. On 4 November the Royal Saudi Air Defense intercepted a ballistic missile over Riyadh International Airport. Foreign Minister Adel al-Jubeir asserted that the missile was supplied by Iran and launched by Hezbollah militants from territory held by Houthi rebels in Yemen. Crown Prince Mohammad bin Salman called it "direct military aggression by the Iranian regime" and said that it "may be considered an act of war against the kingdom". Also on 4 November, the Prime Minister of Lebanon resigned, sparking a political crisis seen as part of a Saudi effort to counteract Iran's influence in the country. Bahrain also blamed a 10 November explosion on its main oil pipeline on Iran.

On 24 November 2017, Dubai's security chief Lieutenant General Dhahi Khalfan blamed the 2017 Sinai attack on Al-Jazeera and called for bombing of the network by a Saudi-led coalition. In late November 2017, IRGC commander Jafari said revolutionary Islamic paramilitary forces had formed across the Middle East and surrounding regions to counter the influence of ultraconservative militant jihadi groups and Western powers.

In 2017 Saudi Arabia funded the creation of the Persian language satellite TV station Iran International, operated from London.

==== 2018 ====
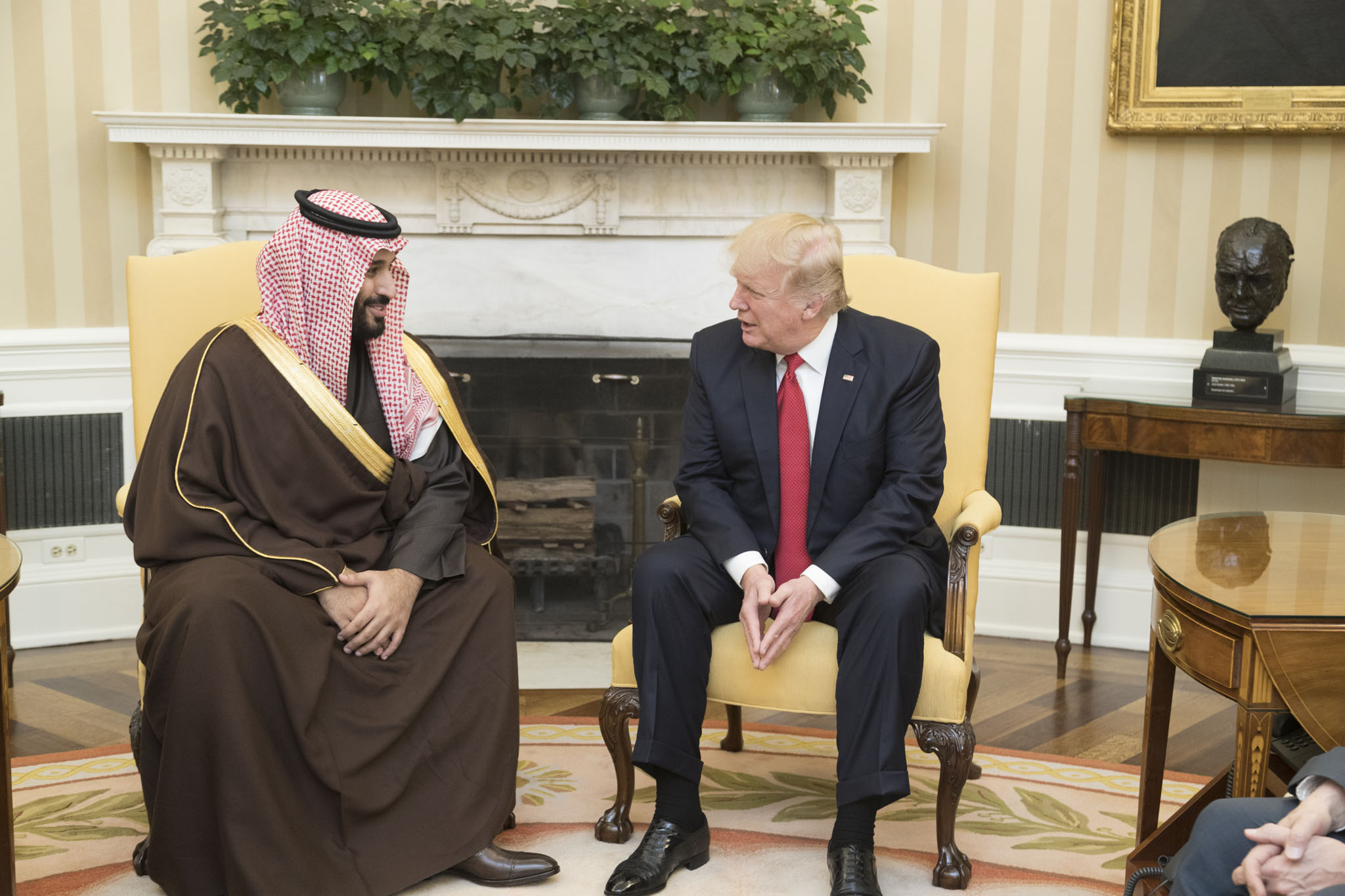
Saudi Crown Prince Mohammad bin Salman meets with US President Donald Trump at the White House on 14 March 2018

Saudi Arabia under King Salman has adopted a more assertive foreign policy, particularly reflected in the country's intervention in Yemen in 2015 and its involvement in Lebanon in 2017. This has continued with the June 2017 appointment of Mohammad bin Salman as Crown Prince, who has been considered the power behind the throne for years. The Crown Prince has referred to Iran, Turkey, and Islamic extremist groups as a "triangle of evil", and compared Supreme Leader Khamenei to Adolf Hitler. The populist, anti-Iranian rhetoric comes at a time of uncertainty over potential fallout from Mohammad bin Salman's consolidation of power, and he has used the rivalry as a means to strengthen Saudi nationalism despite the country's domestic challenges.

As part of the Saudi Vision 2030 plan, Mohammad bin Salman is pursuing American investment to aid efforts to diversify Saudi Arabia's economy away from oil. The reforms also include moving the country away from the Sahwa movement, which the Crown Prince discussed in 2017: "What happened in the last 30 years is not Saudi Arabia. What happened in the region in the last 30 years is not the Middle East. After the Iranian revolution in 1979, people wanted to copy this model in different countries, one of them is Saudi Arabia. We didn't know how to deal with it. And the problem spread all over the world. Now is the time to get rid of it."

Both Israel and Saudi Arabia supported the US withdrawal from the Iran nuclear deal. In anticipation of the withdrawal, Iran indicated it would continue to pursue closer ties to Russia and China, with Ayatollah Khamenei stating in February 2018: "In foreign policy, the top priorities for us today include preferring East to West." The unilateral decision by the United States drew concerns of increased tensions with Russia and China, both of which are parties to the nuclear agreement. It also heightened tensions in the Middle East, raising the risk of a larger military conflict breaking out involving Israel, Saudi Arabia, and Iran.

The United States reinstated sanctions against Iran in August 2018 despite opposition from European allies. The Trump administration also pushed for a military alliance with Sunni Arab states to act as a bulwark against Iran. The plan in consideration would establish a "Middle East Strategic Alliance" with six GCC states in addition to Jordan and Egypt.

The assassination of Jamal Khashoggi prompted international backlash against Saudi Arabia and Mohammad bin Salman. The Trump administration issued a statement reiterating its support for Saudi Arabia and blaming Iran for the war in Yemen. The United States Senate responded to the president by passing bipartisan resolutions condemning the assassination and voting to end United States aid to Saudi Arabia for the war in Yemen, though the measures were considered largely symbolic.

=== 2019–2021 ===
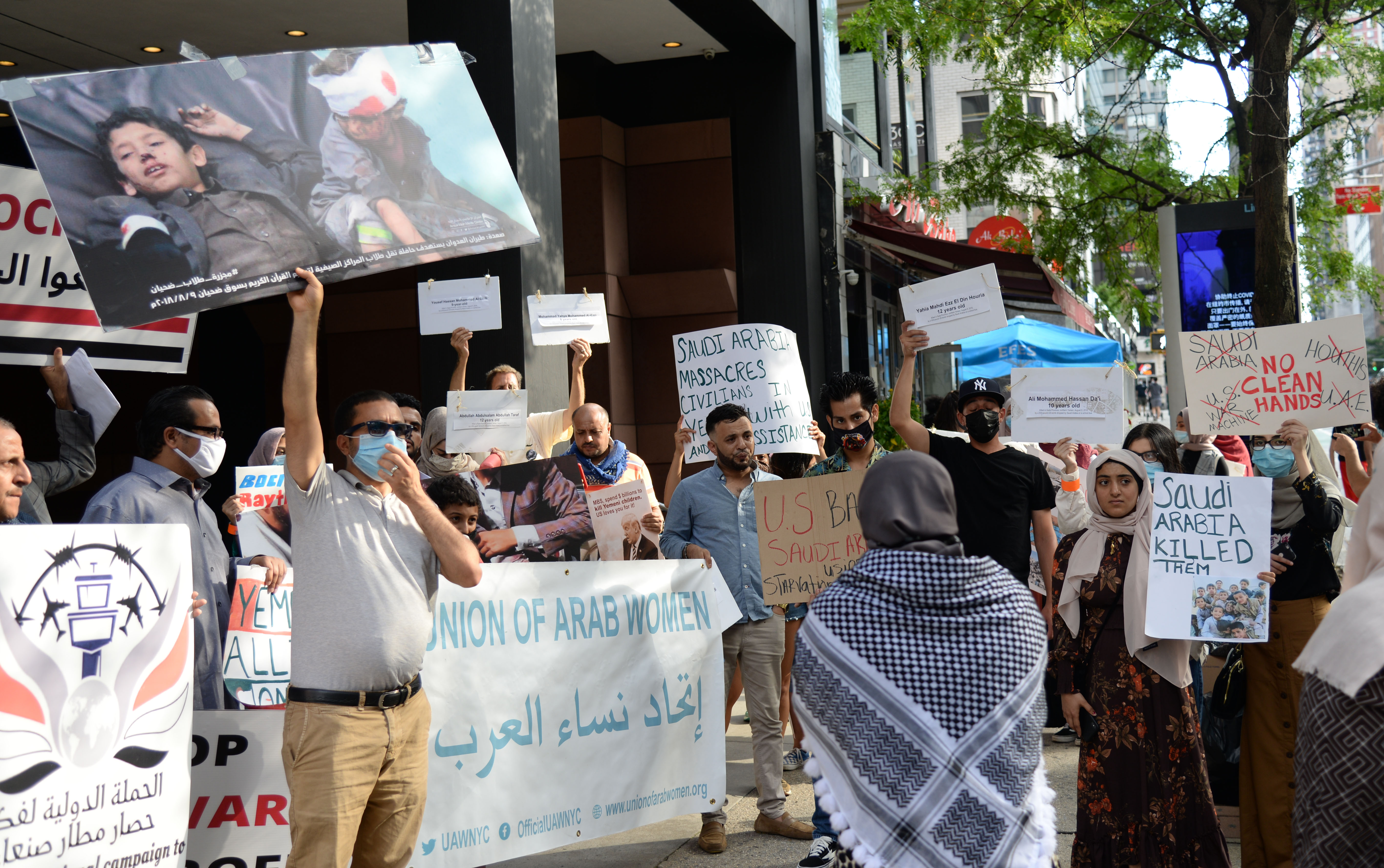
Protest against the Saudi-led intervention and blockade of Houthi-controlled areas of Yemen, New York City, 14 August 2020

Military tensions between Iran and the United States escalated in 2019 amid a series of confrontations involving the US, Iran, and Saudi Arabia. Attacks on oil tankers in the Gulf of Oman took place in May and June. In the wake of growing tensions, Foreign Minister Mohammad Javad Zarif stated that Iran sought good relations with Saudi Arabia, the United Arab Emirates, and their allies, and called on them to end their dispute with Qatar.

In September 2019 a drone attack was launched on the Saudi Aramco oil processing facility in Abqaiq and Khurais oil field in the Eastern Province of Saudi Arabia. The attack knocked out half of the country's oil supply. Although the Houthi rebels in Yemen claimed responsibility, the US Secretary of State Mike Pompeo said that Iran was behind the attack, a charge which Iran denied. Saudi Arabia and the US were reportedly investigating whether the attacks involved cruise missiles launched from Iran or Iraq. US officials had previously concluded that the attack on the East-West pipeline was launched by Iranian-backed militias in southern Iraq, despite Houthi rebels also claiming responsibility.

On 16 September, the US told Saudi Arabia that it had concluded that Iran was a staging ground for the September attack. The US raised the prospect of a joint retaliatory strike on Iran, an action which would potentially broaden into a regional conflict. Saudi Arabia said its investigation was ongoing, but officials alleged that Iranian weapons were used in the strikes and that the attacks were not launched from Yemen. The claims were made without supporting evidence. Iran's Hassan Rouhani, after the attack on Aramco, claimed that Saudi Arabia should take it as a warning to stop its intervention in Yemen. The Saudi-led intervention has led to the deaths of more than thousands to date.

On 3 January 2020, the US launched an airstrike on a convoy near Baghdad International Airport that killed multiple passengers, including Iranian Major general and IRGC Quds Force commander Qasem Soleimani and Iraqi Popular Mobilization Forces commander Abu Mahdi al-Muhandis. The military action came shortly after pro-Iran protesters and Iraqi militiamen attacked the US embassy in Baghdad on 31 December 2019 in response to US airstrikes targeting Iran-backed militia. The airstrike was seen as a major escalation of tensions, and the government of Iran vowed revenge in response. Foreign Minister Mohammad Javad Zarif called the attack "an extremely dangerous and foolish escalation" and released a statement saying that "the brutality and stupidity of American terrorist forces in assassinating Commander Soleimani... will undoubtedly make the tree of resistance in the region and the world more prosperous."

On 7 January, Iran attacked Al Asad Airbase and Erbil International Airport in Iraq as an act of revenge. The attack left 110 injured.

Hours after the missile attacks, during a state of high alert, IRGC forces mistakenly shot down Ukraine International Airlines Flight 752, killing all 176 people on board.

On 12 January, Hezbollah Secretary-General Hassan Nasrallah called for Iran's allies in the Axis of Resistance—including Iran, the Syrian Arab Republic, Hezbollah, the Popular Mobilization Forces, and the Houthi movement in Yemen—to intensify its military campaigns against the U.S. to expel U.S. forces from the Middle East. During a state visit by Emir Tamim bin Hamad Al Thani of Qatar to Iran, Ayatollah Khamenei called for regional cooperation against the U.S. However, following discussions between Sheikh Tamim and President Rouhani, Tamim concluded that de-escalation and dialogue were the only means to resolve the regional crises. In response to the increased tensions, the U.S. Department of Homeland Security and many U.S. states released advisories warning of Iranian cyberattacks, while the Texas Department of Information Resources said Iranian cyberattacks had reached a rate of 10,000 per minute.

The 2019 Warsaw Conference would later lead to the Abraham Accords, with Saudi allies UAE and Bahrain normalizing relations with Israel. This was followed by Morocco and Sudan. This would later lead to the Arab–Israeli alliance, and the Negev Summit. The U.S., along with Israel allegedly announced the formation of the Middle East Air Defense Alliance (MEAD) in June 2022 with the purpose of countering Iran. Israel stated delegations from the U.A.E, Qatar, Bahrain, Jordan, Egypt, Saudi Arabia, and the U.S. participated in broker talks.

=== 2022 ===
In 2022, Iran and Saudi Arabia participated in peace talks brokered by Iraq. In July of that year, the members of the Gulf Cooperation Council, alongside Jordan, Egypt, Iraq, and the United States participated in the Jeddah Security and Development Summit (JSDS). In the summit, members called on Iran to stop intervening in other countries' affairs, and U.S. President Joe Biden ensured that they will not let Iran obtain a nuclear weapon.

Iran has accused Saudi Arabia, the U.S., and Israel of meddling within their internal affairs due to the Mahsa Amini protests.

In late October 2022, Saudi intelligence was shared to the U.S., warning of an imminent attack by Iran, which placed the GCC, Iraq, and Israel on high alert. The intelligence showed that Iran was allegedly planning to strike Saudi Arabia, Iraq, and the Persian Gulf. Iran denied these accusations and intel as baseless.

=== Rapprochement ===
==== Earlier negotiations ====
Since April 2021, Iraq has hosted five rounds of direct talks between the two nations, which cut diplomatic ties in 2016. The 6th round of talks on a ministerial level stalled, but after a meeting in Amman, Jordan, in December 2022, Iran's Hossein Amirabdollahian and Saudi Foreign Minister Prince Faisal bin Farhan Al Saud signaled that both countries would be "open to more dialogue". Despite increased rhetoric by Iran against Saudi Arabia, the Saudis support efforts to revive the stalled Iran nuclear deal. However, the Saudi minister threatened to nullify the negotiations and following agreement if Iran were to obtain nuclear weapons. In January 2023, the Saudi foreign ministers Al Saud speaking at a panel at the World Economic Forum in Davos reiterated that "Riyadh is trying to find a dialog with Iran". He welcomed the decision by Saudi Arabia and other Gulf states to focus on their economies "towards joint prosperity".

==== March 2023 restoration of relations ====
The two countries announced the resumption of relations on 10 March 2023, following a deal brokered by China. The agreement was signed by secretary of the Supreme National Security Council of Iran Ali Shamkhahni and Saudi Arabian national security advisor Musaed Al-Aiban. A joint statement announced that their embassies would re-open within two months. The United Nations Secretary General, Hezbollah, Oman, UAE, Egypt, Pakistan, Indonesia and Malaysia welcomed the reapproachment, while two former Israeli Prime Ministers criticized it.

Under the deal, the countries would restore agreements related to security, trade, and culture. Under the agreement both countries agreed to respect the other's sovereignty and not interfere in the internal affairs of the other. The rapprochement deal was concluded after Ali Khamenei's offer to end Iran's military support to Houthi militants in Yemen and abide by the UN arms embargo, an agreement that pressurizes the Houthis towards a negotiated settlement with the Yemeni government. Saudi and U.S. officials remarked that subsequent Iranian commitments towards de-escalating Yemeni conflict were a "litmus test" for the survival of Chinese-brokered reconciliation deal.

On 20 March 2023, Iranian President Ebrahim Raisi has "welcomed" an invitation from Saudi Arabia's King Salman to visit the kingdom, according to France24. Earlier Iran's top security official Ali Shamkhani also held talks with Emirati President Mohamed bin Zayed Al Nahyan in Abu Dhabi, which paved the way for more security in the region.

=== Middle Eastern crisis ===
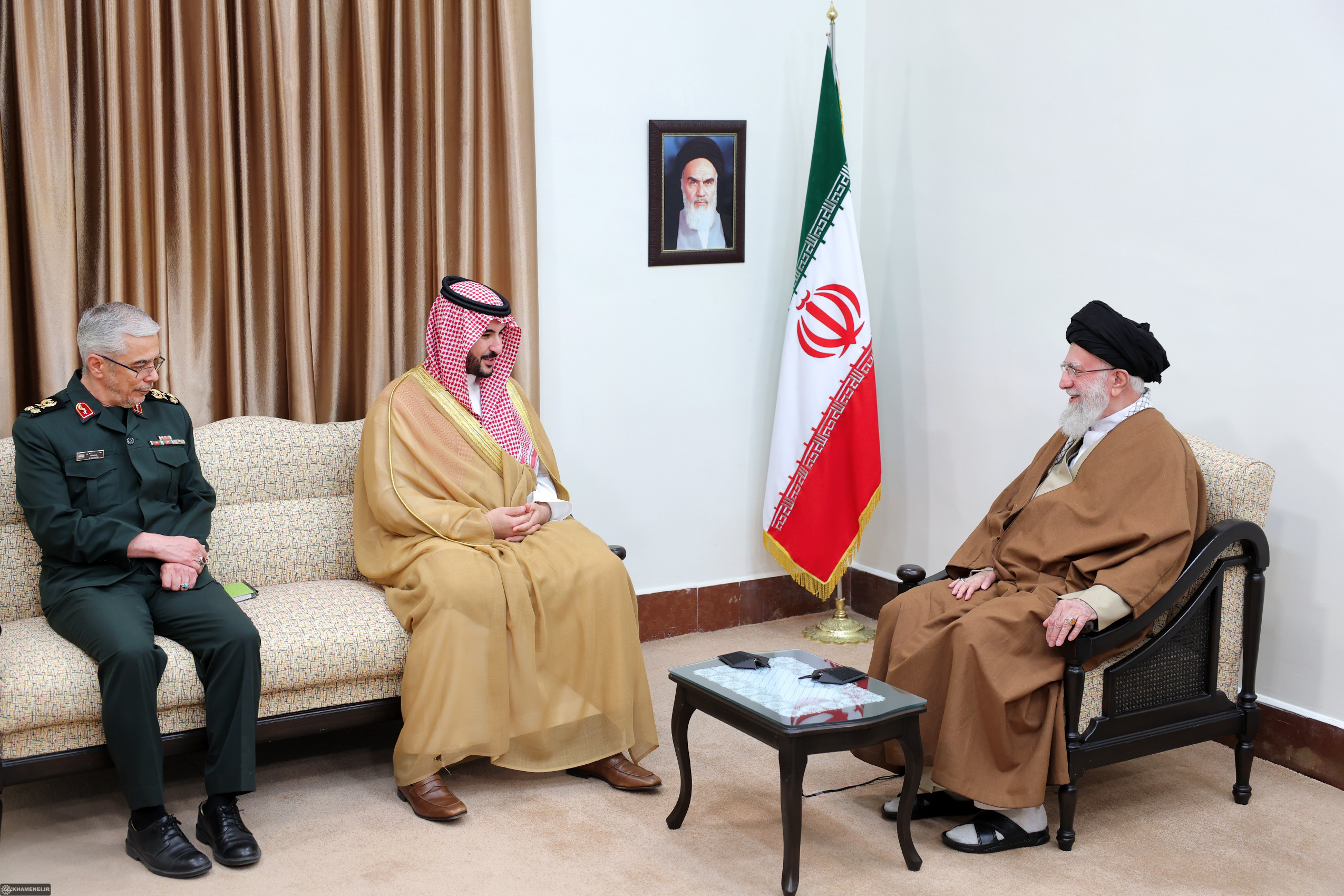
Saudi Arabia's Defense Minister Khalid bin Salman with Ayatollah Ali Khamenei and Iran's Major General Mohammad Bagheri, 17 April 2025

The October 7 attacks on Israel, which initiated the Gaza war, largely paused a period of de-escalatory actions between Iran and Saudi Arabia as the former became engulfed in a region-wide crisis. Iran activated and increased support for its proxies across the entire Middle East to combat Israel. In particular, the Houthis were provided with increased support as they began instituting a global shipping blockade to pressure Israel, leading to the Red Sea crisis. Amid the crisis, both sides continued their détente, with the Iran-backed Houthis avoiding attacks on Saudi interests or territory. Saudi Arabia refused to join Operation Prosperity Guardian, a multinational maritime coalition led by the U.S. to counter the Houthi blockade, or a U.S.–UK airstrike campaign to combat the group's military capabilities, in order to maintain its policy of disengagement from Yemen and rapprochement with Iran.

In late January 2026, Iranian president Masoud Pezeshkian and Saudi crown prince Mohammed bin Salman (MBS) held a critical phone call to discuss regional stability following the arrival of a U.S. aircraft carrier in the region. MBS emphasized that Saudi Arabia would not allow its territory or airspace to be used for military actions against Iran.

==== 2026 Iran war and Saudi strikes on Iran ====
On 28 February 2026, the United States and Israel launched surprise airstrikes against Iran, assassinating Ali Khamenei and sparking the Iran war. Khamenei's death was confirmed by the Iranian Supreme National Security Council and by state media the following day. The Washington Post reported that United States president Donald Trump's decision to attack Iran came after Saudi crown prince Mohammed bin Salman and the Israeli government lobbied him repeatedly to make the move.

In response to surprise attack, Iran began carrying out a series of missile and drone strikes against several U.S.–allied Arab countries across the region, including Saudi Arabia. Among the targets were U.S. bases and Saudi oil infrastructure, such as the Aramco refinery in Ras Tanura. Saudi Arabia retaliated by secretly conducting direct strikes on Iranian drone and missile-launch sites in Iran. The Saudi Air Force also targeted Iranian-backed militias in Iraq.

== Involved parties ==
=== Iranian supporters and proxies ===
==== Ba'athist Syria ====
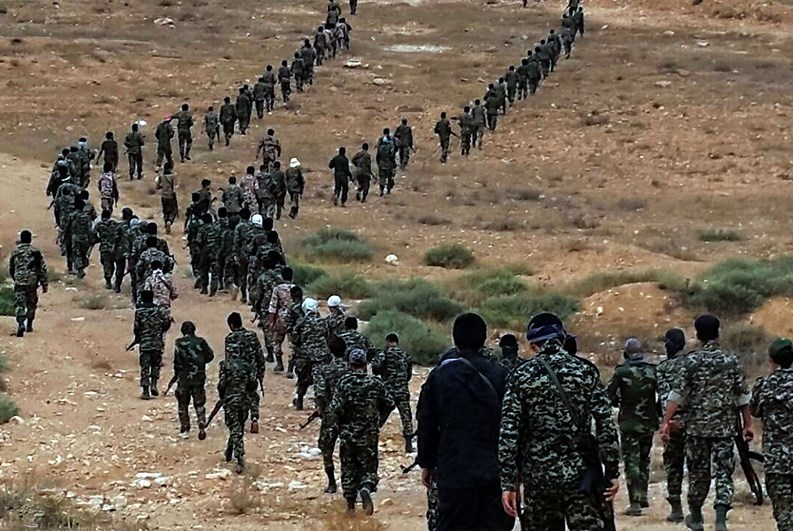
Iranian-supported Liwa Fatemiyoun fighters during the Palmyra offensive in Syria in December 2016

Ba'athist Syria under Bashar al-Assad had been a strategic ally to both Iranian and Russian interests. Since 2011, the year the civil war broke out, Iran and its allies actively involved themselves in the Syrian civil war, with many proxies.

Following the civil unrest triggered against the Assad regime with the Arab uprisings, the main reasons for conflict in Syria were competition for regional power and sectarian divisions. The movement received support from Saudi Arabia, Qatar, the US and Turkey with the aim of overthrowing the Assad government. These uprisings also facilitated the influence of right-wing religious groups and parties over the movement, eventually bringing about ISIS.

At the same time, Syria remained the "primary hub in Iran's power projection in the Levant" and has coordinated, and played a facilitator role over, Iran's links with Hezbollah. Syria, together with Iran and Hezbollah, had been considered and defined as the "Axis of Resistance" against Israel and similar competing regional states located in the Levant. In fact, with the intent of preserving the Assad regime, Iran sent General Qassem Suleimani, among other military commanders, providing training and assistance. The Iranian branch of the armed forces in charge of its foreign operations, i.e. the Islamic Revolutionary Guard Corps or Quds Force (IRGC-QF) and Unit 840, intervened in the Syrian crisis by sending thousands of Iranians and by recruiting and training Shi'ites from other states. These, included Liwa Zaynabiyoun recruiting Pakistani Shias, and Liwa Fatimiyoun comprising Afghan Shi'ites. Iranian assistance also came under the shape of communication and intelligence monitoring technologies of the most recent type.

Conversely, the majority of the funding and equipment for the rebels by the Saudi state was transported through Jordan, together with the provision of ideological support. The rebellion was thus legitimised with the issuing by Saudi and other Muftis of fatwas in favour of jihad against the regime in Syria.

As of 2021, the long-term strategic interest of Iran in Syria appeared to have been secured as the presumed victory of Bashar al-Assad and his allies against Daesh and rebel forces was declared. However the tides turned dramatically due to resurgent rebel offensives in 2024; with only limited Iranian proxies falling back to defend Damascus, the capital fell on 7 December 2024, culminating in the fall of the Assad regime a day later, and the loss of Syria as a key Iranian strategic ally.

==== Hamas ====
Hamas has been allies of Iran, Hezbollah and other Iranian proxies and allies.

The organisation has received arms from Iran via Sudan that acted as "transshipment point" for their circulation, and Eritrea that allowed Iranian navy use of its ports.

Despite the 2005 cease fire agreement that officially ended the Second Intifada, friction arose as Israel attempted to gain access to the Gaza Strip. Hamas initiated a program of tunnel building to overcome the physical isolation. The history of these tunnels goes back as far as prior to the 1979 peace treaty between Israel and Egypt. They were used for a range of different functions: from supporting economic activity through smuggling goods, but also weapons, to infiltration into Israeli territory, abductions and attacks on Israeli soldiers.The maze of tunnels provided access to homes, mosques, schools and public buildings, according to expert in underground warfare Eado Hecht.

Hamas received strong rhetorical support from regime leaders Ali Khamenei, President Mahmoud Ahmadinejad and Majlis speaker Ali Larijani. In July 2008, was deemed to be part of Iran's line of defense against an Israeli attack together with Hezbollah, by IRGC chief Ali Jafari. Late May 2008 reports demonstrated Iran's increase in support to Hamas up to $150 million per year.

==== Hezbollah ====
Hezbollah is one of the main groups in the Middle East to be described as an 'Iranian proxy'. Hezbollah fights alongside Iranian troops in Syria and supports the Houthis. Unit 3800 was Hezbollah's execution arm, responsible for training and providing strategic aid to militant groups in Iraq and Yemen.

Hezbollah served also as inspiration to Houthis in their success at forcing the IDF out of Lebanon.

Iran aims to use Hezbollah as proxy model to establish throughout Africa. Hezbollah already possesses support in West Africa, given the large presence of Lebanese diaspora. Moreover, the group was also used by Iran in the arming and training of insurgents in Nigeria, and has been engaged in Sierra Leone, Côte d'Ivoire, and Senegal.

Hezbollah is often involved in the Illegal drug trade, terrorist activities, proxy warfare, and sectarian violence. Hezbollah is funded by Iran, Syria, Qatar, and Iraq, and was formerly supported by Sudan. Hezbollah is also considered as a terrorist organization by the Arab League and GCC, as it often criticizes states like Saudi Arabia and Egypt. Morocco has also made claims that Hezbollah funds the Polisario Front via Algeria.

Hezbollah has also maintained relations with other Islamic and anti-West movements, including the Popular Mobilization Forces, Hamas, the Palestinian Islamic Jihad, Al-Ashtar Brigades, Hezbollah Al-Hejaz, Liwa Fatemiyoun, Husseiniyoun, the Houthis, and the Baqir Brigade. These movements, among the Iranian, Syrian, and Iraqi governments, form the Axis of Resistance against the United States, Saudi Arabia, and Israel.

==== Nigerian Islamic Movement ====
The Islamic Movement of Nigeria (IMN), a Shiite religious and political organisation founded and headed by Sheikh Ibrahim Zakzaki, constitutes another proxy in the conflict. It constitutes another asset that could enable Iran in disrupting Sunni States in West Africa. Thus, Saudi Arabia by supporting the Nigerian government in its suppressing efforts, and by providing support to rival Sunni groups such as Izala and not seriously condemning Boko Haram's actions, aims to limit its influence and growth in the region.

==== Houthis ====
Iran and its allies North Korea, Syria, Iraq, Qatar, Hezbollah, and Venezuela are known to have provided political, economical, diplomatic, and military support to the Houthis.

Houthis overthrew the government in Yemen in the 21 September Revolution or 2014–15 coup d'état, supported by Iran while Saudi Arabia was attempting to restore the central government through a military campaign. Since the uprising, they have evolved into a well-organised and equipped militia in Yemen.

Houthis can be considered to be similar in their response to Hamas, rather than Hezbollah, given the varying degrees of resources and support without actually responding to or informing Iran. In fact, Houthis took control of Sanaa in September 2014, despite Iran's advising restraint. Saudi officials believe Houthis will become the "next Hezbollah" that operates close to Saudi territory. Moreover, Houthis have been supported in their fight against the Yemeni government through a gateway for arms and supplies smuggling from Iran through Somalia since 2015. Access to Somalia, as well as to Eritrea, together with control of Yemen's Red Sea coast through the Houthis, provided Iran's with an enhanced ability to threaten international shipping in the Bab al-Mandeb. An instances of this capacity was constituted by the several attacks on U.S. and coalition vessels that were set in motion from the Yemeni side of the Bab al-Mandeb in 2016.

A military campaign against Houthis was started by a Saudi-led coalition on the request of ousted President Mansur, dividing the state between pro-Houthi forces supported by Iran and pro-Mansur forces supported by Saudi Arabia. The competition between the two countries has exacerbated the suffering of the Yemeni population, the half of which is deemed to be facing a "pre-famine condition", as reported by the UN in 2018.

In 2022, multiple events occurred, including the following:

- On 16 March 2022, Yemen's Houthi rebels said that negotiations with the Saudi-led coalition would be welcome if the site was a neutral country, such as the Gulf states, and that the top goal would be to relieve "arbitrary" restrictions on Yemeni ports and Sanaa airport.
- On 20 March 2022, according to the Saudi energy ministry and official media, Yemen's Iran-aligned Houthi militia fired missiles and drones against Saudi energy and water desalination facilities, causing a short dip in output at a refinery but no injuries.
- On 26 March 2022, the Saudi-led coalition in Yemen gave the Iran-aligned Houthis a three-hour ultimatum to withdraw weaponry from Sanaa's airport and the two Red Sea ports.
- On 1 April 2022, the warring parties in Yemen's seven-year conflict have agreed to a statewide truce for the first time in years, allowing fuel imports into Houthi-held areas and certain planes to operate from Sanaa airport.
- On 13 April 2022, the US Navy announced the formation of a new multinational task force to target arms smuggling in Yemeni waterways, being the latest American military response to Houthi attacks on Saudi Arabia and the UAE.
- On 28 April 2022, as part of a humanitarian move, the Saudi-led coalition fighting in Yemen said that it would release 163 prisoners from Yemen's Iran-aligned Houthi militia who fought against the kingdom.
- On 6 May 2022, the Saudi-led coalition in Yemen said on Friday it transported more than 100 freed inmates to Yemen in conjunction with the International Committee of the Red Cross.
- On 12 May 2022, three officials stated that Yemen's government has agreed to enable Houthi-issued passport holders to travel outside the country.
- On 2 June 2022, Yemen's warring sides agreed to extend a U.N.-brokered truce for another two months on the same terms as the previous agreement, which was set to expire on 2 June, according to the United Nations envoy to Yemen.

In April 2023, Saudi Arabia had freed more than a dozen Houthi detainees ahead of a wider prisoner release agreed upon by the warring sides. The deal was brokered by Oman and will include future releases of more Houthi prisoners in an effort to normalize political and economic relations in the region.

==== Iraqi militias ====
The most significant aspect of Iran's foreign policy is Iraq. Iraq is a more important field of operations for Iranian officials than other nations where Iran backs local armed organisations. Various Iraqi groups, many of them as part of the Popular Mobilization Forces, have been described as Iranian proxies.

During the Iraqi insurgency, Iran aided Shi'ite groups such as the Mahdi army while private Saudi citizens and the Saudi government aided anti-Iran and Sunni militias. Saudi Arabia supported the 2012–2013 Iraqi protests, and the 2019–2021 Iraqi protests, in which protesters protested against Shi'ite prime ministers Nouri al-Maliki and Adil Abdul-Mahdi, respectively.

The Popular Mobilization Forces rose to prominence in 2014 when Shia groups banded together during the Iraq-ISIL War. The PMF, aided by Iran and Syria and supported internally by al-Maliki and Haider al-Abadi, defeated ISIL internally by December 2017, however, refused to disarm, and waged attacks against American forces in Syria and Iraq. These groups also supported other 'Islamic Resistance Movements' such as Hezbollah, Hamas, Al-Mukhtar Brigades, the Houthi movement, the Palestinian Islamic Jihad, and Hezbollah Al-Hejaz, as part of the Axis of Resistance. The PMF also engaged in the 2019–2021 Persian Gulf crisis against CJTF-OIR.

==== Bahraini militias ====
Iran and its allies have backed multiple Shia groups in Bahrain. These opposition groups include:

- Al-Ashtar Brigades
- Al-Mukhtar Brigades
- Waad Allah Brigades
- Saraya Thair Allah
- Popular Resistance Brigades
- February 14 Youth Coalition
- Other minor groups

These groups fight the Bahraini government in order to overthrow the House of Khalifa. These groups are backed by Iran and Kata'ib Hezbollah financially, militarily, verbally, and ideologically. These groups, in turn, support Iran and the Axis of Resistance in conflicts in Syria, Palestine, and Iraq. Exceptionally, the 14 February Youth Coalition, founded during the 2011 Bahraini uprising, became a paramilitary group during the Shia insurgency.

=== Saudi Arabian supporters and proxies ===
==== Gulf Cooperation Council ====
The Gulf Cooperation Council, an alliance of Sunni Arab States of the Gulf region including Saudi Arabia, has often been described as a Saudi headed alliance to counter Iran, which engaged pro-Saudi interests in Bahrain.

===== Bahrain =====
Bahrain is a major ally to Saudi interests, and a major member of the Gulf Cooperation Council. Bahrain is a member of the Saudi coalition against the Houthis. However, Bahrain's population is somewhere between 70 and 85% Shia, and has led to protests, of which, the most notable was the 2011 protests, which were suppressed by the Peninsular Shield Force.

Iran has been accused of supporting militant groups in the insurgency in Bahrain, especially the Al-Ashtar Brigades. Iran also formerly supported the Islamic Front for the Liberation of Bahrain in attempting to overthrow the Bahraini monarchy, as such in 1981.

Bahrain has also historically on the Saudi side, as it sent weapons to Iraq during the Iran–Iraq War, aided the Syrian opposition, sent troops to the Saudi Arabian–led coalition in Yemen, severed ties with Iran in the aftermath of the 2016 attack on the Saudi diplomatic missions in Iran, and signed the Abraham Accords in 2020 with Israel.

===== Kuwait =====
Kuwait is a strategic ally to Saudi interests in the Gulf area. Kuwait has involved itself in the Yemeni civil war as part of the Saudi coalition, along with formerly supporting the Syrian opposition.

===== United Arab Emirates =====
The U.A.E and Saudi Arabia are strategic allies, as both see Iran as a common enemy.

The U.A.E has been a major contributor to the Saudi Arabian–led coalition in Yemen, has supported the Autonomous Administration of North and East Syria, and joined up with Saudi Arabia and Egypt to support the Libyan National Army and its leader Khalifa Haftar.

==== Kurdish insurgents ====
Saudi Arabia and the UAE has also supported the Kurdish-led Autonomous Administration of North and East Syria, as part of CJTF-OIR. Saudi Arabia also support Iraqi Kurdistan against Iraq and Iran.

==== Albania ====
Due to Albania's decision to welcome the MEK to take refuge in the country, tensions between Iran and Albania increased. Since 2018, Albania has accused Iran of hounding Iranian dissidents and has expelled several Iranian diplomats. In January 2020, following the death of Qasem Soleimani, the Iranian government lashed out at Albania for hosting MEK members, and Iran has increased cyberattacks and agent hunting on Iranian dissidents against Albania. Saudi Arabia, in response, announced its support for Albania in its efforts against Iran.

==== Jaish ul-Adl ====
The rebel group Jaish ul-Adl, active in the Sistan and Baluchestan region of Iran, is accused by Iranian authorities of receiving Saudi and American support.

==== Israel ====
The speaker of Iran's parliament, Ali Larijani, stated that Saudi Arabia gave "strategic" intelligence information to Israel during the 2006 Lebanon War. In May 2018, Israeli defense minister Avigdor Lieberman supported greater discussion between Israel, Saudi Arabia and the Gulf states, stating "It's time for the Middle East to [...] have an axis of moderate countries," opposed to the network of Iranian allies and proxies. As of 2018, several sources described alleged intelligence ties between Saudi Arabia and Israel as a "covert alliance", with a joint interest to counter Iran in the region. The New York Times remarked that such cooperation was made more difficult by controversy over Israel's attitude towards Palestinians.

Israel and Saudi Arabia are both part of the Middle East Air Defense Alliance (MEAD).

==== United States ====
The United States and Saudi Arabia have a strategic relationship that dates back to 1947.

When the Iranian Revolution occurred, revolutionaries began to support other uprisings and rebellions throughout the Muslim world, including in Bahrain and Saudi Arabia. Iran used this policy to undermine their sovereignty while fighting in proxy warfare. This caused Saudi Arabia and the other Gulf allies to turn to the U.S. for support.

The U.S., Saudi Arabia, and the GCC jointly backed Iraq under Saddam Hussein during the Iran–Iraq War and the U.S. and Iran directly attacked each other during the Tanker War.

The U.S. and Iran again opened in mistrust during the Iraq War, with the U.S. and the GCC accusing Iran of funding and militarizing its proxies and Shia groups within Iraq. The highest point of mutual distrust happened in 2005 after details of Iran's nuclear program were leaked, and sanctions by the UN were put in place. The sanctions were put in place until 2015, when the JCPOA was implemented.

Iran and U.S. have also been embroiled in tensions due to the wars in Syria, Afghanistan, Iraq, and disputes surrounding the Strait of Hormuz. In the 2011–2012 Strait of Hormuz dispute, Iran threatened to close Hormuz, however, was forced to back down after the EU placed sanctions.

The U.S. and Iran were brought to the brink of war during the 2019–2021 Persian Gulf crisis, when the U.S. assassinated Qasem Soleimani and Abu Mahdi al-Muhandis, leaders of the Quds Force and the Popular Mobilization Forces, respectively. This was after the December 2019 United States airstrikes in Iraq and Syria and the Attack on the United States embassy in Baghdad, and Iran retaliated by bombing Al Asad Airbase in Iraq.

U.S.-Saudi relations have deteriorated due to the Yemeni civil war and Syrian civil war. Saudi Arabia formerly supported the Al-Nusra Front, an Al-Qaeda affiliate in Syria. Saudi Arabia has also been involved in war crimes in Yemen due to civilian airstrikes and a humanitarian blockade. The U.S. supported the Saudi Arabian–led invasion until 2022, when Joe Biden repealed support for it and halted arm sales to Saudi Arabia and the U.A.E.

US Secretary of State Mike Pompeo denounced the attacks on the Saudi oil industry, on 14 September 2019, as an "act of war". President Donald Trump called for an increase in sanctions against Iran opposing the strikes. President Trump approved the deployment of additional U.S. troops to Saudi Arabia and the United Arab Emirates following the attack on Saudi oil facilities that the United States blamed on Iran.

==== Jordan ====
Jordan has historically been on the Saudi bloc despite its slight rivalry. Jordan and Iran have sour relations with each other.

=== Other involved parties ===
==== Turkey ====
Turkey has long seen Iran's expansions as threats but also perceived Saudi Arabia's influence with a similar reception, and is seeking to build itself as an alternative replacement to both Saudi and Iranian influences, to a degree. Historically, both Saudi Arabia and Turkey were part of the Western bloc. Turkey sided with Saudi Arabia throughout the conflicts in Syria and Yemen to contain against Iranian influence, however, both sides backed different groups.

However, Turkey's growing military, political, and economic influence have caused some concern on Saudi circles with the start of the Qatar diplomatic crisis, when Turkey sided with Qatar. Iran also considers Turkish military adventurism in Syria and its growing encounter against Iran in the Levant and Iraq as a challenge, not to mention its good relationship with Azerbaijan. Azerbaijan has antagonistic relations with Iran, and friendly relations with the Persian Gulf Arab states and Israel. Meanwhile, Saudi Arabia has also begun a systematic campaign to rewrite history, changing the Ottoman Empire into the occupier of Arabia; while it has also partially financed other megaprojects to counter the growing Turkish presence in Qatar, Sudan, Maghreb, Somalia, Kuwait, and Oman.

Turkey was able to improve its relations with both Saudi Arabia and the UAE after the end of the Qatar diplomatic crisis. Erdoğan met with Mohammed bin Salman in June 2022 to boost their economic and political relations. Emirati-Turkish reconciliation in 2021, followed by Turkey's decision to move Khashoggi's case to the Saudi authorities and the mutual disdain of Biden administration to both Saudi Arabia and Turkey, paved a way for Saudi-Turkish reconciliation.

Both Turkey and Saudi Arabia supported Syrian opposition against Bashar al-Assad. Saudi Arabia and Turkey were among the first countries to welcome the new administration in Syria after the fall of the Assad regime. Turkey played a key role to ensure the new Syrian government would not pose any threats to the Arab states of the Persian Gulf. Saudi Arabia and Turkey continued to strengthen their ties through cooperation and the mutual interest in both countries to contain Iran. Even though, both Saudi Arabia and Turkey maintains different strategic goals, both countries agree that limited cooperation is necessary for economic growth and regional stability.

==== Qatar ====
Qatar–Saudi Arabia relations have been strained since the beginning of the Arab Spring. Qatar has been a focus of controversy in the Saudi-Iranian rivalry due to Saudi Arabia's longstanding concern about the country's relationship with Iran and Iranian-backed militant groups.

In June 2017, Saudi Arabia, the United Arab Emirates, Bahrain, Egypt, the Maldives, Mauritania, Sudan, Senegal, Djibouti, Comoros, Jordan, the Tobruk-based Libyan government, and the Hadi-led Yemeni government severed diplomatic relations with Qatar and blocked their airspace and sea routes, in addition to Saudi Arabia blocking the only land crossing. The reasons cited were Qatar's relations with Iran, Al-Jazeera's coverage of other GCC states and Egypt, and Qatar's alleged support of Islamist groups. Qatar was also expelled from the anti-Houthi coalition. Qatar's defense minister Khalid bin Mohammed Al Attiyah called the blockade akin to a bloodless declaration of war, and Qatar's finance minister Ali Sharif Al Emadi stated that Qatar was rich enough to withstand the blockade. As of 2020, Saudi Arabia, the United Arab Emirates, Bahrain and Egypt have maintained the blockade, whereas all other countries mentioned above had rebuilt their relations with Qatar. The blockade ended in 2021 when the four countries and Qatar agreed to restore relations.

The bloc sought a guarantee that Qatar will in the future align in all matters with other Gulf states, discuss all of its decisions with them, and provide regular reports on its activity (monthly for the first year, quarterly for the second, and annually for the following ten years). They also demanded the deportation of all political refugees who live in Qatar to their countries of origin, freezing their assets, providing any desired information about their residency, movements, and finances, and revoking their Qatari citizenship if naturalized. They also demanded that Qatar be forbidden from granting citizenship to any additional fugitives. Upon Qatar's rejection of these demands, the countries involved announced that the blockade would remain in place until Qatar changed its policies. On 24 August 2017, Qatar announced that they would restore full diplomatic relations with Iran.

Saudi Arabia together with the United Arab Emirates (UAE), Egypt and Bahrain, restored bilateral relations with Qatar on 5 January 2021. Diplomatic and trade ties were severed and a land, sea and air blocked on Qatar were imposed in June 2017. Relations were restored after the end of Qatar diplomatic crisis.

Qatar also has a history of funding the Houthi movement, the Muslim Brotherhood, Hezbollah, the Al-Ashtar Brigades, and al-Qaeda. now after the attack on Qatar by Israeli Forces Qatar is now approaching towards The Arab leaders Like MBS's Saudi Arabia to increase security corporation

==== Russia ====
Russia has been aligned with Iran and Syria for years. It intervened in Syria to provide support for the Assad government and to target rebel groups, working together with Iran and using Iranian air bases to stage air strikes. It also joined Iran, Iraq, and Syria in forming a joint intelligence-sharing coalition as part of the fight against ISIL. The alliance coincided with the US-led coalition created a year earlier to fight ISIL. The competing military actions were seen as part of a larger proxy conflict between the United States and Russia. However, Russia's tie with Saudi Arabia has become increasingly warmed since 2010s despite numerous differences, thus sometimes affected Iran's stance on relations with Russia.

In the past, Saudi Arabia backed Chechen and Dagestani fighters as well as Arab Mujahedeen in the North Caucasus during the First and Second Chechen Civil Wars in the 1990s, in which Russia has fought against them. In recent years however, Saudi Arabia has shifted its diplomacy to become friendlier to Russia, with King Salman became the first Saudi head of state to visit Russia, heralding possible political change. Since then, Saudi Arabia and Russia have started to support each other in various conflicts in Syria and Libya, with Saudi Arabia supported Russian intervention in Syria, while Russia and Saudi Arabia have together backed Khalifa Haftar's forces in Libya. In addition, Saudi Arabia and Russia are also becoming more antagonistic to Iranian ambitions in the Middle East, as revealed by their secret cooperation alongside Israel and Jordan against Iran.

Likewise, since late 2010s, sign of Iranian–Russian friction emerged, following Iran's attempt to turn Bashar al-Assad to align with the Islamist ideology of the Iranian regime which opposed to Russia's desire for a secular state. Russia's attitude toward Iran is also becoming more negative due to Iranian desire to control the Middle East, resulting in growing cooperation with Saudi Arabia.

But currently after the fall of Assad regime in Syria Russia have diverted its ties from Syrian Saudi-backed regime towards other regional partners

==== Oman ====
Oman is a member of the GCC and thus, maintains a close relationship with Saudi Arabia. However, unlike the majority of GCC countries, Oman does not perceive Iran as a threat. Oman has long promoted itself as the main stabilizing force amidst the intensified Iranian–Saudi conflict and often prefers a diplomatic solution to end the proxy wars. However, it is alleged of Houthi support and Iranian arms smuggling.

==== Pakistan ====
Pakistan is a major partner of Saudi Arabia, but is also a neighbor of Iran, sharing historical ties as well. Prior to 1979, the three countries formed a moderate relationship and acted as responsible Muslim states. However, since 1979, Pakistan has fallen into sectarian discord due to growing attempt by Iran and Saudi Arabia to spread influence to the country, with Pakistan having a balance of Sunni and Shi'a Muslims.

Pakistan's relations with Saudi Arabia has been historically strong, and often Pakistan has feared Iran is trying to recruit its large Shi'a population to serve for Iran's military adventures, given by increasing number of vanishing Shi'as in Pakistan. Its link with Iran is also marred with a number of problems regarding not just Shia issue, but also due to conflict in Afghanistan, with Iran-backed proxies and the Taliban have fought against Pakistan that further strengthens Pakistan's relations with Saudi Arabia. However, Pakistan has refrained from criticizing Iran, but rather seeks to preserve the relations, given its long historical relationship with Iran. Pakistan has backed Iran on its effort to maintain border security in the restive Balochistan region, and have cooperated against the Soviets in the 1980s.

In 2019, Pakistani prime minister Imran Khan, during a visit to Tehran, said that he was trying promote talks between Iran and Saudi Arabia to defuse the tension between the two countries. Following the Twelve-Day War, Pakistan opted to pursue more amicable relations with Iran. It remained neutral during the 2017 Qatar-Gulf crisis.

== Involvement in regional conflicts ==
=== Syrian Civil War ===
Syria has been a major theatre in the proxy conflict throughout its civil war, which began in 2011. Iran and the GCC states have provided varying degrees of military and financial support to opposing sides, with Iran backing the Assad government and Saudi Arabia supporting rebel militants. Ba'athist Syria was an important part of Iran's sphere of influence, and the government under Bashar al-Assad had long been a major ally. During the early stages of the Arab Spring, Supreme Leader Khamenei initially expressed support for the revolutions in Tunisia and Egypt, characterizing them as an "Islamic awakening" akin to its own revolution in 1979. When protests broke out in Syria, Iran changed its position and condemned them, comparing the uprising to its own presidential election protests in 2009 and accusing the United States and Israel of being behind the unrest.

The war threatened Iran's position, and Saudi Arabia and its allies sided with Sunni rebels in part to weaken Iran. For years, Iranian forces were involved on the ground, with soldiers in the Islamic Revolutionary Guards Corps facing heavy casualties. In 2014, with no end in sight to the conflict, Iran increased its ground support for the Syrian Army, providing elite forces, intelligence gathering, and training. Iran also backed pro-Assad Hezbollah fighters. Although Iran and Saudi Arabia agreed in 2015 to participate in peace talks in Vienna in participation with United States Secretary of State John Kerry and Russian Foreign Minister Sergey Lavrov, the talks ultimately failed.

Saudi Arabia countered Russia's intervention in Syria by increasing its support for the rebels and supplying American-made anti-tank TOW missiles, a move which slowed initial progress made by Russian and Syrian forces.

Iran suffered a significant setback in Syria with the fall of the Assad regime to renewed rebel offensives in 2024.

=== Yemeni civil war ===
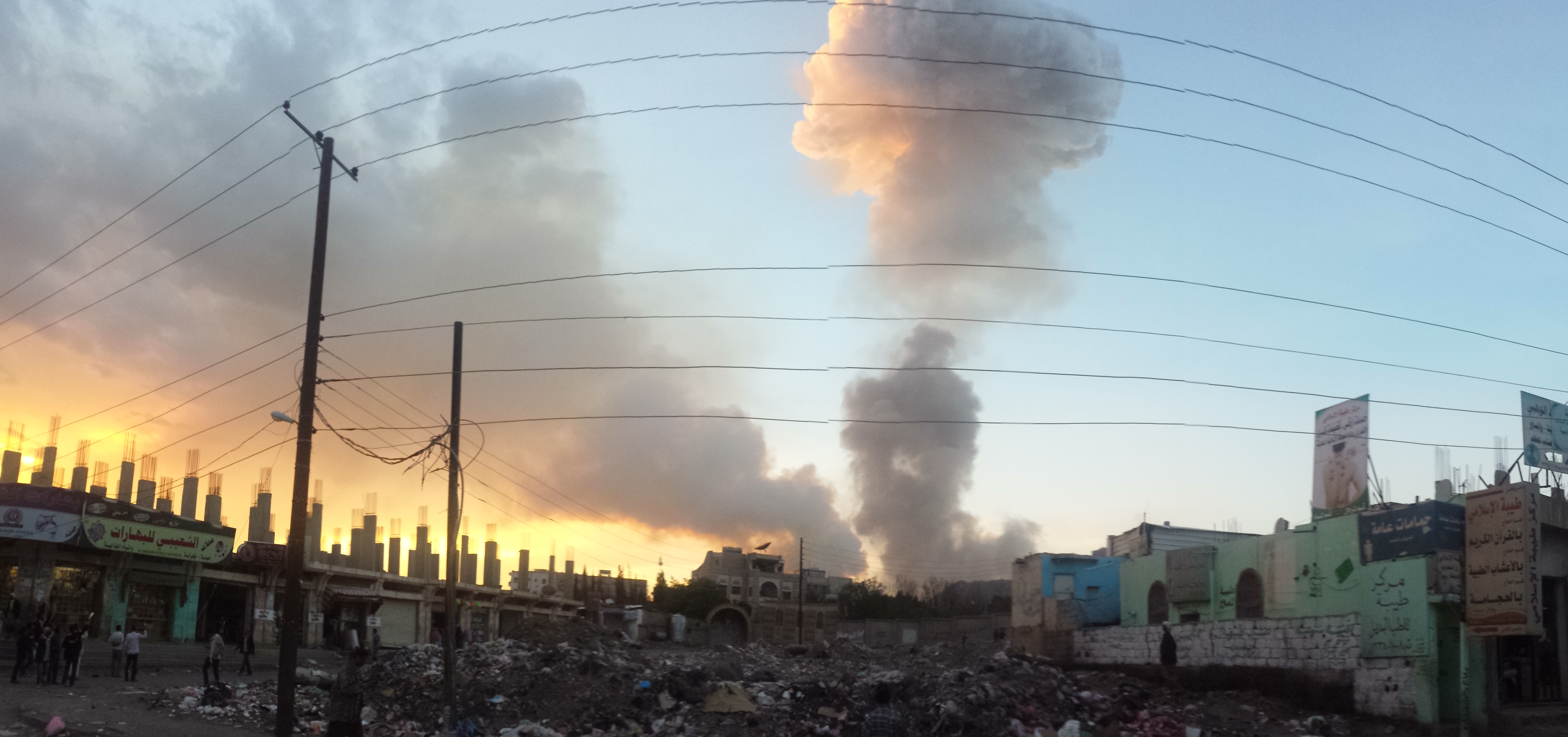
An airstrike in Sana'a by a Saudi-led coalition on 11 May 2015

Yemen's geographical position in the southern region of the Arabian Peninsula, close to Egypt and East Africa, and bordering Saudi Arabia, makes it important for Iran. With the help of the Houthis, Iran was able to expand its network of proxies without making significant financial or military investments in the southern borders of Saudi Arabia. With Iranian assistance, the Houthis were able to consolidate their position in Yemen and the Middle East. Yemen has been called one of the major fronts in the conflict as a result of the revolution and subsequent civil war. Yemen had for years been within the Saudi sphere of influence. The decade-long Houthi insurgency in Yemen stoked tensions with Iran, with accusations of covert support for the rebels. A 2015 UN report alleged that Iran provided the Houthi rebels with money, training, and arms shipments beginning in 2009. However, the degree of support has been subject to debate, and accusations of greater involvement have been denied by Iran. The 2014–2015 coup d'état was viewed by Saudi leadership as an immediate threat, and as an opportunity for Iran to gain a foothold in the region. In March 2015, a Saudi-led coalition of Arab states, including all GCC members except Oman, intervened and launched airstrikes and a ground offensive in the country, declaring the entire Saada Governorate a military target and imposing a naval blockade.

The United States intervened in October 2016 after missiles were fired at a US warship, which was in place to protect oil shipments along the sea lane passing through the Mandeb Strait. The US blamed the rebels and responded by targeting radar sites with missile strikes along the Red Sea coast. In response, rebels called the strikes evidence of American support for the Saudi campaign.

=== War in Iraq ===
While the majority of Muslims in Iraq are Shia, the country has been ruled for decades by Sunni-dominated governments under the Ottoman Empire, the British-installed Hashemites, and the Ba'athists. Under the rule of Saddam Hussein, Iraq was hostile to both Iran and Saudi Arabia and acted as a counterbalancing regional power. The American-led invasion in 2003 caused a power vacuum in the region. With the antagonistic Ba'athist regime removed, Iran sought a more friendly Shia-dominated government and supported sympathetic rebel factions as part of an effort to undermine the coalition, which Iran feared would install a government hostile to its interests.

Saudi Arabia remained more passive during the occupation of Iraq, taking caution to preserve its relations with the United States by avoiding any direct support of Sunni insurgent groups. Riyadh supported the Bush administration's commitment to stay in the country, as it limited Iran's influence. The edicts issued in May 2003 by Coalition Provisional Authority Administrator Paul Bremer to exclude members of the Ba'ath Party from the new Iraqi government and to disband the Iraqi Army undermined the occupation effort. The orders empowered various insurgent factions and weakened the new government's functional capabilities, leaving Iraq vulnerable to future instability.

Following the United States withdrawal from Iraq in December 2011, the country drifted further into Iran's sphere of influence. The instability that resulted from the Iraqi Civil War and the rise of ISIL threatened the existence of the Iraqi regime and led to an Iranian intervention in 2014. Iran mobilized Shia militia groups to halt and ultimately push back the advancing Sunni insurgency, though the resurgence of ISIL in Iraq remains more than a possibility.

The Iraqi government remains particularly influenced by Iran, and consults with it on most matters. As of 2018 Iran has become Iraq's top trading partner, with an annual turnover of approximately US$12 billion compared to the US$6 billion in trade between Iraq and Saudi Arabia. In addition to fostering economic ties, Tehran furthered its influence by aiding the Iraqi government in its fight against the push for independence in Iraqi Kurdistan, which is mainly Sunni. Saudi Arabia has responded by strengthening its ties to the Kurdistan Regional Government, seeing it as a barrier to the expansion of Iranian influence in the region, while also adopting a soft power approach to improve relations with the Iraqi government.

Izzat Ibrahim al-Douri, former Ba'athist official and leader of the Naqshbandi Army insurgent group, has repeatedly praised Saudi efforts to constrain Iranian clout in Iraq.

Recently, Saudi Arabia has developed a close relationship with Shia cleric Muqtada al-Sadr, the leader of the Sadrist Movement and the Peace Companies militia as well as a critic of both U.S. and Iranian involvement.

=== Bahraini uprising ===
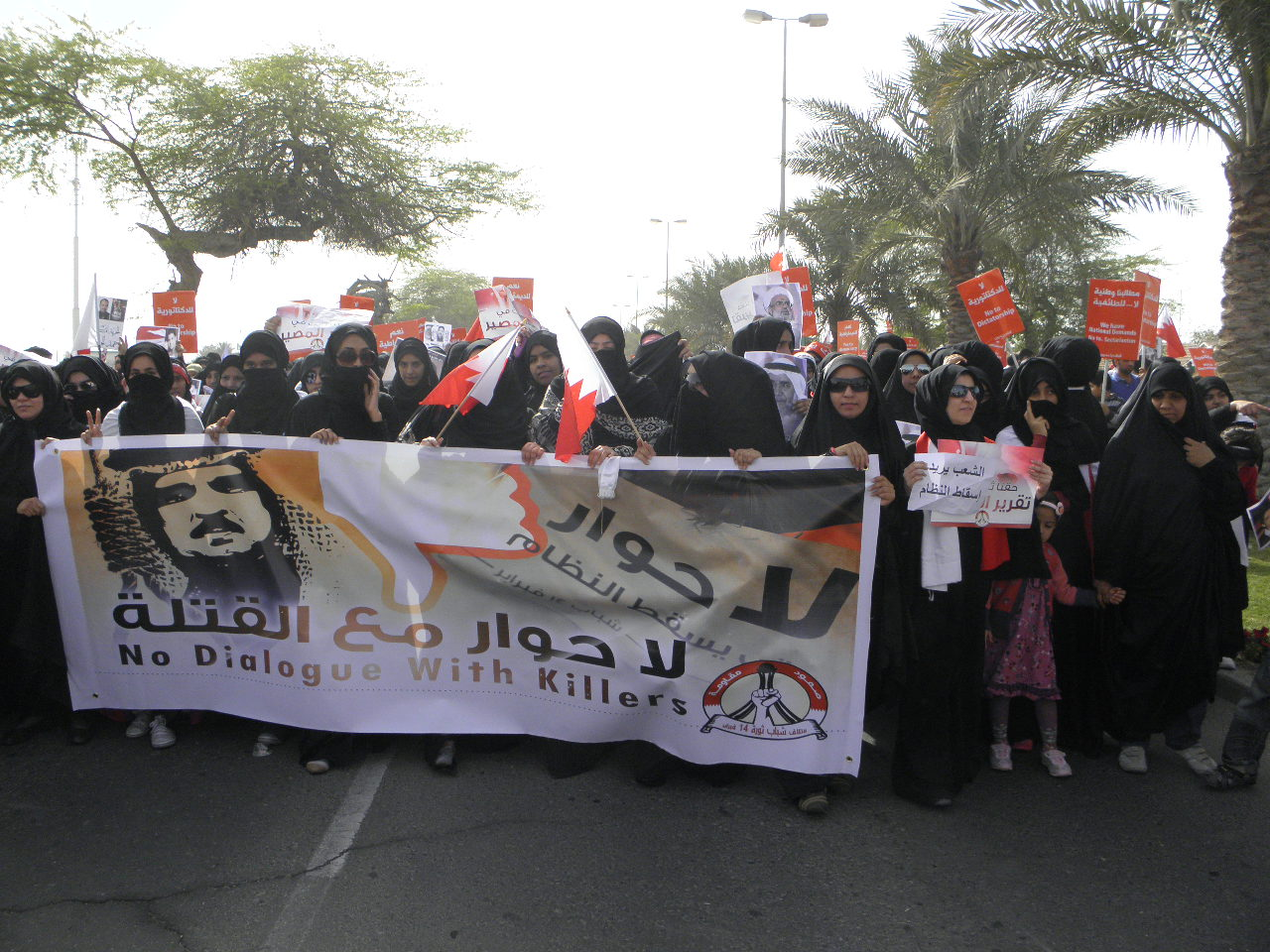
Bahraini anti-government protests in 2012

Saudi Arabia and Iran have sought to extend their influence in Bahrain for decades. While the majority of Muslims in Bahrain are Shia, the country is ruled by the Sunni Al Khalifa family – who are widely viewed as being subservient to the Saudi government. Iran claimed sovereignty over Bahrain until 1970, when Shah Mohammad Reza Pahlavi abandoned claims after negotiations with the United Kingdom. The Iranian Revolution led to resumed interest in Bahraini affairs. In 1981, the front organization Islamic Front for the Liberation of Bahrain led a failed coup attempt to install a Shia theocratic regime led by Hadi al-Modarresi. Since then, the government has accused Iran of supporting terrorist plots within its borders.

Sunni states have long feared that Iran might stir up unrest among regional Shia minority populations, especially in Bahrain. Bahrain government's stability depends heavily on Saudi support. The island is connected to Saudi Arabia by the 25 kilometer King Fahd Causeway, and its proximity to Saudi Arabia's oil-rich, the Saudi Shia minority in Eastern Province is viewed by Riyadh as a security concern. Any political gains by the Shia in Bahrain are seen by the Saudis as gains for Iran.

In response to the Arab Spring in 2011, the GCC governments sought to maintain their power through social reform, economic handouts, and violent repression. Member states also distributed a share of their combined oil wealth to Bahrain and Oman to maintain stability. Saudi-led GCC forces quickly intervened in support of the government of Bahraini to put down the anti-government uprising in Bahrain.

The Bahraini government publicly blamed Iran for the protests, but an independent commission established by King Hamad rejected the claim, instead highlighting human rights abuses committed in the crackdown. The protests, along with the Iran nuclear deal, strained Bahrain's relationship with the United States. Bahrain has sought closer ties with Russia as a result, but this has been limited due to Saudi Arabia's alliance with the US.

Following the onset of the Arab Winter, Bahrain accused Iran of orchestrating several domestic incidents as part of a campaign to destabilize the country. Tehran denied all allegations and accused the government of Bahrain of blaming its own internal problems on Iran after every incident. In August 2015, authorities in Bahrain arrested five suspects over a bombing in Sitra. Officials linked the attacks to the Revolutionary Guard and Hezbollah, although Iran denied any involvement. In January 2016, Bahrain joined Saudi Arabia in cutting diplomatic ties with Tehran following the attacks on Saudi diplomatic missions in Iran. In November 2017, Bahrain called an explosion on its main oil pipeline "terrorist sabotage" linked to Iran, drawing a rebuke from Tehran. Saudi Arabia also referred to the incident as an "attack on the pipeline".

=== Lebanese politics ===
In 2008, Saudi Arabia proposed creating an Arab force backed by US and NATO air and sea power to intervene in Lebanon and destroy Iranian-backed Hezbollah, according to a leaked US diplomatic cable. According to the cable Saudi argued that a Hezbollah victory against the Siniora government "combined with Iranian actions in Iraq and on the Palestinian front would be a disaster for the US and the entire region".

In February 2016 Saudi Arabia banned their citizens from visiting Lebanon and suspended military aid due to possible Iranian influence and Lebanon's refusal to condemn the attack on Saudi embassy. Furthermore, Bahrain, Kuwait, and the United Arab Emirates advised all their citizens not to travel to Lebanon and urged them to leave immediately.

Lebanese Prime Minister Saad Hariri resigned on 4 November 2017. The situation was seen as a power play by Saudi Arabia to increase its influence in Lebanon and counterbalance Iran's victories in Iraq and Syria. In a televised speech from Saudi Arabia, Hariri criticized Hezbollah and blamed Iran for causing "disorder and destruction" in Lebanon. Hezbollah leader Hassan Nasrallah responded by accusing Hariri of resigning on Riyadh's orders.

=== War in Afghanistan ===
The rivalry has contributed to the ongoing instability in Afghanistan. Afghanistan shares ties with Iran through the Persian language, but is strategically important to Saudi Arabia. After the Cold War, Saudi policy shifted from fighting the spread of communism to containing Iranian influence in South and Central Asia.

Saudi Arabia was one of three countries to officially recognize the Sunni Taliban government in 1996, along with its allies Pakistan and the United Arab Emirates. During the Afghan Civil War, Iran and Saudi Arabia supported opposing militant factions. Iran assisted the Shia Hezb-e Wahdat, while Saudi Arabia provided financial support to the Wahhabist Ittihad-e Islami.

In 2001, the invasion of Afghanistan and the removal of the Taliban in the wake of the September 11 attacks benefited Iran, which had previously been on the brink of war with the group. The regime change removed Iran's primary threat along its eastern borders, and the removal of Saddam Hussein two years later further bolstered its position, allowing it to refocus its efforts on other areas, especially Syria and Yemen. In the ensuing years, Iran sought to expand its influence over Afghanistan. It provided limited support to the Taliban as a potential means of increasing leverage with the Afghan central government and creating a deterrent to conflict with the United States, although the support waned amid growing backlash in Afghanistan against perceived Iranian interference. Iran has also sought to expand soft influence by building pro-Iranian schools, mosques, and media centers, and by maintaining close ties with Afghanistan's Tajik and Hazara populations. Originally Iran support the central government against the Taliban, which was still funded by Saudi Arabia in the months following 9/11. However, due to American presence, Iran resorted to funding the Taliban, while Saudi Arabia helped the Afghan Government in reconstruction.

=== Pakistani sectarian violence ===
Since the 1980s, Pakistan has been dealing with sporadic sectarian conflict, and the Muslim population is predominantly Sunni with about 10–20% Shia adherents. The Saudi Arabia enjoys a strong public support from the country's conservative sphere and has occupied a unique statue in Pakistan's foreign policy stature.

Pakistan is economically dependent on oil imports from Saudi Arabia, a key strategic ally but shares some historical cultural ties with Iran. The foreign employees Saudi oil industry from Pakistan plays a crucial role in Pakistan's economic stability who sends large remittances back home. The largest amount comes from the 1.5 million Pakistanis working in Saudi Arabia who sent home about US$5.5 billion in remittances in 2017. There are also allegations of Saudi Arabia's financial grants to Pakistan's national laboratories that built Pakistan's nuclear weapons program. The Saudi monarchy also views the Balochistan province of Pakistan as a potential means of stirring ethnic unrest in neighboring Iran, with its province of Sistan and Baluchestan.

In February 2018, Saudi Arabia, acting on behalf of the GCC, joined China and Turkey in opposing a US-led initiative to place Pakistan on an international terror-financing watch list through the Financial Action Task Force. This move came days after Prime Minister Imran Khan went onto to deploy ~1,000 military troops to the Gulf kingdoms for what it described as an "advisory mission".

At home, the Pakistani lawmakers have been levelling accusations at Iran of influencing Pakistani Shias to act as proxies to further Iranian interests in Pakistan. The Iranian government has been suspected of militarizing Shias amongst Pakistan's local population and promoting sectarian sentiments to further achieve its goals. According to the Pakistani intelligence assessments, many Pakistani Shias have also been suspected of traveling to parts of the Middle East including Syria and Lebanon to fight on behalf of the Iranian government.

=== Nigerian Sectarianism ===
The Islamic Movement of Nigeria (IMN), a Shiite religious and political organisation founded and headed by Sheikh Ibrahim Zakzaki, constitutes another proxy in the conflict. It constitutes another asset that could enable Iran in disrupting Sunni States in West Africa. Thus, Saudi Arabia by supporting the Nigerian government in its suppressing efforts, and by providing support to rival Sunni groups such as Izala and not seriously condemning Boko Haram's actions, aims to limit its influence and growth in the region.

=== Israeli–Palestinian conflict ===
Iran and Saudi Arabia have employed different approaches to the Israeli–Palestinian conflict. Iran has preferred confrontational methods, arming and financing proxies such as Hamas and Hezbollah (and lesser proxies such as PIJ and PFLP) in its ongoing proxy conflict with Israel. Saudi Arabia has taken a diplomatic approach, such as backing Fatah's negotiations with Israel and the Arab Peace Initiative announced in 2002 and re-endorsed in 2007 and 2013 to bring about a comprehensive peace accord with Israel. Saudi Arabia strengthened ties with Israel in 2018, when Crown Prince Mohammad bin Salman stated that Israelis have a right to their own land.

=== Libyan crisis ===
Iran and Saudi Arabia have waged a proxy war in Libya, with Saudi Arabia, along with the U.A.E, Egypt, and Sudan, have provided support to the Libyan National Army, and its leader warlord Khalifa Haftar. Iran initially supported Khalifa Haftar and supplied his forces with anti-tank missiles. Qatar and Turkey support the Government of National Accord, however, Iran later voiced support for Tripoli government and Islamist groups against Haftar's Salafi militias. According to the UN, Iran also sent weapons to the GNA and its affiliates.

Saudi-Turkish rapprochement after the end of the Qatar diplomatic crisis further complicated the situation in Libya. Turkey has successfully improved its relations with supporters of Haftar; notably with Egypt, Saudi Arabia, and the United Arab Emirates, while Iran remains isolated. Saddam Haftar, the son of Khalifa Haftar, has made multiple visits to Turkey. Haftar aligned Libyan House of Representatives decided to form a committee to study the maritime agreement signed with Turkey by Government of National Accord.

== Nuclear programs of Iran and Saudi Arabia ==
Although both Iran and Saudi Arabia signed the Treaty on the Non-Proliferation of Nuclear Weapons in 1970 and 1988 respectively, a potential nuclear arms race has been a concern for years. Both governments claim that their programs are for peaceful purposes, but foreign governments and organizations have accused both of taking steps to obtain nuclear weapons capabilities.

Iran's ongoing nuclear program began in the 1950s under the Shah in cooperation with the United States as part of the Atoms for Peace program. The cooperation continued until the Iranian Revolution in 1979. Sanctions have been in place since then, and were expanded in 2006 with the passage of United Nations Security Council Resolution 1737 and Resolution 1696 in response to Iran's uranium enrichment program.

Saudi Arabia has considered several options in response to the Iranian program: acquiring its own nuclear capability as a deterrent, entering into an alliance with an existing nuclear power, or pursuing a regional nuclear-weapon-free zone agreement. It is believed that Saudi Arabia has been a major financier of Pakistan's integrated nuclear program since 1974, a project begun under former Prime Minister Zulfikar Ali Bhutto. In 2003 it was reported that Saudi Arabia had taken the "strategic decision" to acquire "off-the-shelf" atomic weapons from Pakistan, according to senior American officials. In 2003, The Washington Times reported that Pakistan and Saudi Arabia had entered a secret agreement on nuclear cooperation to provide the Saudis with nuclear weapons technology in return for access to cheap oil for Pakistan.

Following several years of negotiations for a nuclear deal framework between Iran and the P5+1 countries, the Joint Comprehensive Plan of Action (JCPOA) was signed in 2015. The deal raised concerns for Saudi Arabia, which saw it as a step toward reducing Iran's international isolation and potentially exacerbating the proxy conflict. However, Riyadh did not publicly denounce the deal at the time as Israel did. In 2018, Crown Prince Mohammad bin Salman stated that Saudi Arabia would move to obtain nuclear weapons if Iran's program is successful. He led a delegation to the United States to meet with Trump administration officials to discuss mutual concerns, including a potential US withdrawal from the Iran nuclear agreement. In April 2018, Israeli Prime Minister Benjamin Netanyahu gave a televised speech accusing Iran of covertly continuing the AMAD Project in violation of the JCPOA.

U.S. President Trump announced on 8 May 2018 that the United States would withdraw from the JCPOA and reinstate previous sanctions against Iran in addition to imposing new sanctions. In anticipation of the decision, Iranian President Rouhani stated that Iran would remain in the deal if the remaining parties did the same, but was otherwise vague on how the country would respond to the US decision.

== See also ==
- Outline of the Yemeni crisis, revolution, and civil war (2011–present)
- Timeline of the Yemeni crisis (2011–present)
- Iran–Saudi Arabia relations
- Iran–Israel proxy conflict
- Iran–Turkey proxy conflict
- Arab–Israeli alliance
- Saudi Arabian–led intervention in Yemen
- International propagation of Salafism
