= 2015 Sitra bombing =

2015 bombing in Bahrain

- Part of Insurgency in Bahrain
- Location: Sitra, Bahrain
- Date: 28 July 2015
- Target: Bahraini Police
- Attack type: Bombing
- Weapon: Pipe bomb
- Deaths: 2
- Injuries: 6
- Perpetrator: Waad Allah Brigades

On 28 July 2015, a bomb attack occurred outside a girls school in Sitra, Bahrain. Two policeman were killed, one was seriously injured, and five others had some minor injuries.

== Bombing ==
A blast hit policemen on patrol, killing two and injuring another six. According to Bahraini media, the explosives used for the bomb resembled seized explosives smuggled from Iran. Iran denied any interference in Bahrain and called for a united Middle Eastern front to fight all sorts of militants.

== Responsibility ==
Saraya al-Mukhtar claimed Waad Allah Brigades was behind the attack and congratulated them in a twitter post.

== Aftermath ==
The Ministry of Interior called the bombing a "terrorist attack" and claimed that they have arrested the perpetrators and suspects behind this bombing.
