= 2017 Jidhafs bombing =

2017 bombing in Bahrain

2017 Jidhads bombing
- Part of Insurgency in Bahrain
- Location: Jidhafs, Bahrain
- Date: 27 October 2017
- Target: Bahraini Police
- Attack type: Bombing
- Weapon: Pipe bomb
- Deaths: 1
- Injuries: 8
- Perpetrator: Waad Allah Brigades

On 27 October 2017 a bomb detonated in a bus filled with police officers passing by Jidhafs, Bahrain, which killed a Bahraini policeman and seriously injured 8 others. Authorities than began a manhunt to find the assailants of the attack.

== Bombing ==
A bus filled with police officers was passing by Khalifa bin Salman highway in the village of Jidhafs close to Manama, where a Handmade bomb exploded and killed a police officer, and seriously injured eight.

== Responsibility ==
Saraya Waad Allah claimed responsibility for the attack and has stated that the attack was "out of revenge for the guiltless blood and proud souls that were sacrificed".
