= Mohammed bin Saeed Al-Moghedi =

Saudi general

Major General Mohammed bin Saeed Al-Moghedi is a two-star rank Saudi military officer and incumbent Secretary General of the Islamic Military Counter Terrorism Coalition (IMCTC), an alliance of 43 countries that forms a pan-Islamic unified front in the global to fight against terrorism and violent extremism being headquartered in Saudi Arabia. Earlier, he was appointed in 2019 as acting secretary general in same organization succeeding Lt. Gen Abdelelah bin Otham Al-Saleh. He served as the Royal Saudi Land Forces before he joined IMCTC at 2019.

== Military service ==
Moghedi served as head of the Intelligence Directorate and Saudi Land Forces Security. But Al-Moghedi started his career as an aviation officer, air squadron officer, and then Land Forces helicopters’ battalion commander. He coordinate the aims of IMCTC to assist member countries to enhance their military capabilities to fight terrorism. General Moghedi was awarded prestigious "King Faisal Medal of Third Order" for his role in serving the armed forces in operations Decisive Storm and Restoring Hope in Yemen.
