= 2014 Daih bombing =

2014 bombing in Bahrain

- Part of Insurgency in Bahrain
- Location: Al Daih, Bahrain
- Date: 3 March 2014
- Target: Bahraini Police
- Attack type: Bombing
- Weapon: Pipe bomb
- Deaths: 3
- Injuries: 3
- Perpetrator: Al-Ashtar Brigades

On 3 March 2014, a bombing attack occurred in the Al Daih village of Bahrain. Officers had been dispersing rioters and militants from the village, when a bomb exploded, killing three policemen. including an Emirati officer.

== Bombing ==
Officers were clashing with militants and protesters in a village close to Manama, where witnesses claim to have heard firing tear gas and birdshot to disperse the militants. Three policemen were suddenly killed by an improvised explosive device midst clashes.

== Responsibility ==
The militant group Saraya al-Ashtar claimed responsibility of the attack in an online statement.

== Aftermath ==
The Bahraini government captured the three militants responsible for this attack, and according to human rights activists, they were likely tortured. On January 15, (Almost three years after the bomb attack), the three militants responsible were executed by firing squad.
