= Islamic Military Counter Terrorism Coalition =

Intergovernmental counterterrorist military alliance

Islamic Military Counter Terrorism Coalition التحالف الإسلامي العسكري لمحاربة الإرهاب
- Emblem

- Flag

- Founding members Additional members Former members
- Formation: December 15, 2015; 10 years ago
- Type: Military alliance
- Legal status: Active
- Purpose: Anti-terrorism
- Headquarters: Riyadh, Saudi Arabia
- Location(s): Asia and Africa
- Region served: Muslim world
- Members: 43 List: Afghanistan (Islamic Republic); Bahrain; Bangladesh; Benin; Brunei; Burkina Faso; Cameroon; Chad; Comoros; Cote d'Ivoire; Djibouti; Egypt; Gabon; Gambia; Guinea; Guinea-Bissau; Jordan; Kenya; Kuwait; Lebanon; Libya; Malaysia; Maldives; Mali; Mauritania; Morocco; Niger; Nigeria; Oman; Pakistan; Palestine; Qatar; Saudi Arabia; Senegal; Sierra Leone; Somalia; Sudan; Togo; Tunisia; Turkey; Uganda; United Arab Emirates; Yemen (PLC)
- Official language: Arabic, English, French
- Secretary-General of the Islamic Military Counter Terrorism Coalition: Major General Mohammad bin Saeed Al-Moghedi
- Commander of the Islamic Military Counter Terrorism Coalition: General Raheel Shareef
- Website: www.imctc.org/en/

The Islamic Military Counter Terrorism Coalition (IMCTC) is an intergovernmental counter-terrorist military alliance between 43 member states in the Muslim world, united around the war against the Islamic State and other counter-terrorist activities. Its creation was first announced by Saudi Arabian defence minister Mohammad bin Salman Al Saud, on 15 December 2015. The alliance was to have a joint operations center in Riyadh, Saudi Arabia.

When the coalition was announced there were 34 members. Additional countries joined and the number of members reached 42 when Kenya joined on 1 September 2022. On 6 January 2017, the Former Chief of Army Staff of Pakistan General Raheel Sharif was named the IMCTC's first commander. Most of its participants are members of the Organisation of Islamic Cooperation.

== History and objectives ==
IMCTC has stated that its primary objective is to protect Muslim countries from all terrorist groups and terrorist organizations irrespective of their sect and name. The IMCTC affirmed that it would operate in line with the United Nations and the Organisation of Islamic Cooperation (OIC) provisions on terrorism.

At the press conference to launch the IMCTC, Mohammad bin Salman said it would "coordinate" efforts to fight terrorism in Iraq, Syria, Libya, Egypt and Afghanistan. He said, "There will be international coordination with major powers and international organisations ... in terms of operations in Syria and Iraq."

The alliance does not include any countries with Shia-dominated governments, such as Iran, Iraq and Syria. According to a Euronews report, some analysts see formation of the alliance as part of Saudi Arabian efforts to take the leading role in the Middle East and the Muslim world, in rivalry with Iran. Due to the dominance of the alliance by states having majority Sunni Muslim populations, it has been called "a sectarian coalition" by Hakeem Azameli, a member of the Security and Defense Commission in the Iraqi parliament.

However, Oman, an Ibadi-dominant country has joined the alliance. Lebanon has also supported the alliance. Other countries who are part of the alliance or support it that have cordial or friendly relations with Iran include Bangladesh, Kuwait, Libya, and Pakistan.

In March 2016, it was reported that Saudi Arabia had asked the then Pakistani Chief of Army Staff Raheel Sharif, to become commander of the ICMTC once he had retired from the Pakistan Army at the end of 2016.

== Members ==
Saudi Arabia's original announcement of the alliance on 15 December 2015 listed 34 countries as participants, each also a member of the Organisation of Islamic Cooperation (OIC), and forming about 60% of all OIC member states. As of May 2025, there are 43 member countries with the joining of Cameroon on 1 May 2025.

Country	Membership announcement	Military role^{α}	Supporter	References
Afghanistan (Islamic Republic)		—N/a	—N/a	
Bahrain	Original	Yes	Yes	
Bangladesh	Original	Yes	Yes	
Benin	Original	—N/a	—N/a	
Brunei				
Burkina Faso				
Cameroon				
Chad	Original	Yes	Yes	
Comoros	Original	—N/a	—N/a	
Côte d'Ivoire	Original	—N/a	—N/a	
Djibouti	Original	—N/a	—N/a	
Egypt	Original	Yes	Yes	
Gabon	Original	—N/a	—N/a	
Gambia				
Guinea	Original	—N/a	—N/a	
Guinea-Bissau				
Jordan	Original	Yes	Yes	
Kenya	1 September 2022	Yes	Yes	
Kuwait	Original	Yes	Yes	
Lebanon	Original	—N/a	Yes	
Libya	Original	Yes	Yes	
Malaysia	Original	Yes	Yes	
Maldives	Original	Yes	Yes	
Mali	Original	—N/a	—N/a	
Mauritania	Original	Yes	Yes	
Morocco	Original	Yes	Yes	
Niger	Original	Yes	Yes	
Nigeria	Original	Yes	Yes	
Oman	28 December 2016	Yes	Yes	
Pakistan	Original	Yes	Yes	
Palestine	Original	—N/a	—N/a	
Qatar	Original	—N/a	—N/a	
Saudi Arabia	Original	Yes	Yes	
Senegal	Original	Yes	—N/a	
Sierra Leone	Original	—N/a	—N/a	
Somalia	Original	Yes	Yes	
Sudan	Original	Yes	Yes	
Togo	Original	—N/a	—N/a	
Tunisia	Original	Yes	Yes	
Turkey	Original	Yes	Yes	
Uganda				
United Arab Emirates	Original	Yes	Yes	
Yemen (PLC)	Original	Yes	Yes	

^α These countries have offered to provide military assistance if needed.

=== Supporting nations ===
The following are non-member supporting nations:

France
United Kingdom
United States

=== Prospective additional members ===
At the time of the original announcement, more than ten other Islamic countries, including Indonesia (the world's largest Muslim populated nation), had expressed their support for the alliance, and Azerbaijan was discussing joining the alliance. In 2018, however, former deputy defense minister Sjafrie Sjamsoeddin remarked that Indonesia's non-alignment barred the country from joining a military alliance, adding that Vice President Jusuf Kalla had disagreed with Indonesia's accession.

By January 2017, Azerbaijan said that joining was "not on the agenda". Tajikistan's ambassador to Saudi Arabia confirmed that Tajikistan was seriously studying the possibility of joining.

On August 16, 2023, IMCTC's Secretary General, Maj. Gen. Al-Maghedi, pointed that the IMCTC looked forward for the United Republic of Tanzania to join IMCTC and work hand in hand with the rest of IMCTC member states in countering terrorism and violent extremism.

== Commanders ==
Commander	Nationality	Start of tenure	End of tenure
General Raheel Shareef	Pakistan	6 January 2017	Incumbent

== Reactions ==
State

- Bangladesh: Bangladesh was one of the early members to join the alliance doing so on 15 December 2015. The country confirmed its membership in a joint statement by the founder nations that stated "a duty to protect the Islamic nation from the evils of all terrorist groups and organizations whatever their sect and name which wreak death and corruption on earth and aim to terrorize the innocent." However Bangladesh ruled out any military support.
- China: China has expressed its willingness to cooperate with the alliance to fighting terrorism and appreciated Saudi efforts to create alliance.
- Egypt: Egypt's Al-Azhar University called the alliance's formation "historic."
- Germany: Germany's defense minister Ursula von der Leyen welcomed the alliance against terrorism but also stressed that it should be a part of the Vienna process involving all countries fighting against IS like the U.S., Europe, Russia, Turkey, Saudi Arabia, but also including Iran and China.
- Malaysia: Malaysian Defence Minister Hishammuddin Hussein expressed support for the alliance, but ruled out any military support from Malaysia.
- Pakistan: After initial ambiguity Pakistan welcomed the initiative; its government confirmed its participation and stated that the country is waiting for further details in order to decide the extent of its participation in the different activities of the alliance.
- Turkey: Turkey's Prime Minister Ahmet Davutoğlu called it the "best response to those who are trying to associate terror and Islam".
- United States: The new alliance has been welcomed by the United States, with then U.S. Secretary of Defense Ash Carter saying, "We look forward to learning more about what Saudi Arabia has in mind in terms of this coalition. But in general it appears it is very much in line with something we've been urging for quite some time, which is greater involvement in the campaign to combat ISIL by Sunni Arab countries.

Other

- Army of the Men of the Naqshbandi Order: Izzat Ibrahim al-Douri the leader of the Naqshbandi Army released a statement in 2016 praising the alliance and calling on what he called Mujahideen to fight Shia militias in Iraq backed by Iran, while also saying "We consider everything that is happening in Iraq from Iran, its agents, militias, and its security apparatus, is the responsibility of the United States". He added: "If it [U.S.] did not move to save Iraq and its people from Iran's hegemony, control and occupation, and to stop bloodshed, destruction, burning and the changing demographic, then Iraqi people should resist [the occupation]."
