= Shia insurgency in Bahrain =

Part of Bahraini uprising of 2011 and the Iran–Saudi Arabia proxy conflict

- Part of 2011 Bahraini uprising and the Iran–Saudi Arabia proxy conflict
Date	14 February 2011 – present
Location	Bahrain
Status	Ongoing

Belligerents
Government of Bahrain	Bahraini opposition Iran

Commanders and leaders
Hamad bin Isa Al Khalifa	Hasan Yusuf

Units involved
Ministry of Interior; Public Security Forces; Bahrain Defence Force	Al-Ashtar Brigades; Waad Allah Brigades; Al-Mukhtar Brigades; Saraya Thair Allah; Popular Resistance Brigades; February 14 Youth Coalition; Saraya al-Karar; Asa’ib al-Muqawama al-Bahrainia; Imam al-Mahdi Brigades; Al-Haydariyah Brigades

Casualties and losses
22 deaths and more than 3,500 injuries to policemen since 2011	Unknown

The Shia insurgency in Bahrain is an ongoing insurgency by militant groups, part of the Bahraini Opposition, supported by Iran, to topple the government of Bahrain.

== Timeline ==
=== 2011 ===
- The insurgency began in 2011, with the start of the Bahraini uprising.

=== 2012 ===
- On 10 April 2012, a bomb attack injured seven policemen in Akr.
- On 5 November 2012, at least five homemade bombs exploded in the nation's capital, killing 2 Asian workers and injuring another.

=== 2013 ===
- On 12 July 2013, a home-made bomb wounded Bahraini policemen outside the Shiite village, according to the interior ministry. State-media claimed it was "planted by terrorists" near the capital, Manama.

=== 2014 ===
- On 15 February 2014, one policeman was killed in a bombing.
- On 3 March 2014, three policeman were killed in a bombing by Al-Ashtar Brigades, including an Emirati officer, in the 2014 Daih bombing.
- On 19 April 2014, two men were killed and another injured after their car exploded. They were suspected to be militants transporting explosives.
- On 5 July 2014, policeman Mahmud Farid was killed in a bombing in Eker village.

=== 2015 ===
- On 28 July 2015, a bomb killed two policemen and wounded six in Sitra in the 2015 Sitra bombing.

=== 2016 ===
- On 30 June 2016, 1 person was killed and 3 injured after a roadside bombing. 2 people were arrested who were suspected of planting the bomb. Bahrain accused Iran's Revolutionary Guards for being behind the bombing, although this is only an accusation, and does not rule out the possibility of terrorism. U.S. Vice President Joe Biden expressed his concerns after the attack. The bombing was described as a "terrorist bombing".
- On 1 July 2016, one woman was killed and three children injured in a bombing.

=== 2017 ===
- On 1 January 2017, one policeman was killed and a second injured in a jailbreak conducted by four-six armed men at Jaww prison. 10 inmates convicted of terrorist offenses escaped.
- On 15 January 2017, three militants (Abbas al-Samea, Sami Mushaima and Ali al-Singace) were executed for the 3 March 2014 bombing.
- On 29 January 2017, a police officer in Bahrain was shot dead in an attack claimed by a Shi'ite militant group.
- On 18 June 2017, a member of the security forces was killed and two others were wounded after a bombing in Diraz.
- On 19 June, a Shia militant accidentally blew himself up with an improvised explosive device.
- In June 2017, Saraya al-Mukhtar performs a cyberattack on a former government official's Twitter account.
- On 2 October 2017, five policemen were injured in a bombing in the village of Daih on Budaiya road.
- On 27 October 2017, one policeman was killed and eight wounded in a bombing of a bus near the Jidhafs area.
- On 10 November 2017, a bomb caused a fire at Bahrain's main pipeline near Buri village.

=== 2018 ===
- On 7 February 2018, four members of the cell behind the bomb attack on the oil pipeline were arrested.
- On 3 March 2018, 116 militants who were part of cells established by the Islamic Revolutionary Guard Corps were arrested.

=== 2019 ===
- On 27 July 2019, two alleged militants were executed by the state on charges of terrorism. Both were allegedly involved in the January 1, 2017 killing of a prison guard that helped let 10 detainees escape, as well as for the killings of two other police officers that month. The two were arrested in February 2017.

=== 2020 ===
- On 15 December 2020, the United States Department of the Treasury added the Saraya Al-Mukhtar (aka. Bahraini Islamic Resistance, aka. Al-Mukhtar Brigades, etc.) to the Specially Designated Nationals list, subjecting it to economic sanctions imposed by the United States. The sanctions were imposed due to their connections with Iran.

=== 2021 ===
- In November the Bahraini government says it had foiled an attempted attack by insurgents.

=== 2024 ===
- 27 April: Al-Ashtar Brigades conducted a drone attack against the offices of an Israeli company in Eilat.
- 2 May: Al-Ashtar Brigades conducted a drone attack against Eilat's port on 2 May.

=== 2026 ===
May: Violent clashes between the security forces and pro-Iran rioters erupted during the 2026 Iran war.

November: The Bahraini government sentenced 64 clerics to life in prison for establishing groups linked to the IRGC.
