= Al-Mukhtar Brigades =

Shia organization in Bahrain

- Other name: Saraya Al-Mukhtar
- Founded: 2013
- Allegiance: Iran (IRGC)
- Ideology: Khomeinism; Shia Islamism; Pan-Iranism; Anti-West; Islamic nationalism Iranian nationalism
- Part of: Axis of Resistance
- Wars: Insurgency in Bahrain; Syrian civil war

The al-Mukhtar Brigades, also called Saraya al-Makhtar or Bahraini Islamic Resistance, is a Bahraini Shia insurgent movement that has taken part in several attacks against government targets. It is classified as a terrorist organization by multiple countries, including the United States and United Kingdom. The United States and Bahrain have both accused Iran's Islamic Revolutionary Guard Corps (IRGC) of backing the organization. It is one of the main opposition movements in Bahrain to take up arms and is one of the rebel factions of the insurgency in Bahrain, the other main one being the al-Ashtar Brigades.

== Ideology ==
The Brigades swore allegiance to Khomeinism in 2016, on the anniversary of the death of Iranian leader Ayatollah Khomeini. The Brigades have an official goal to overthrow the House of Khalifa and to turn Bahrain into a province of Iran. The Mukhtar Brigades supported Shia rebels in Saudi Arabia during the Qatif conflict.

== History ==
The al-Mukhtar Brigades was founded in 2013, two years after the end of the 2011 Bahraini uprising. The group has carried out around 200 attacks in the country, primarily involving the use of improvised explosive devices against security forces and Peninsula Shield Force officers. While attacks have decreased since 2018, the organization is still active. After the assassination of Qasem Soleimani, the Brigades signed a statement publicly condemning the United States' action and warning of retaliatory attacks. The document stated that it "consider[s] all its [the United States'] interests and presence in Bahrain to be legitimate targets" and vowed to carry out attacks on US targets in Bahrain.

In June 2017, the group hacked the Twitter account of a Bahraini politician who had previously served as Foreign Minister.

The Mukhtar brigades also have activities abroad, and have intervened in the Syrian civil war to support Syrian government forces, where the Small Wars Journal says they collaborate with Hezbollah. The organization has publicly admitted its close ties to the Iraqi pro-Iranian Kata'ib al-Imam Ali and Saraya al-Khorasani paramilitaries.

== Designation as a terrorist group ==
Bahrain recognizes the Brigades as a terrorist organization. Saudi Arabia, Egypt, and the United Arab Emirates all classified the al-Mukhtar Brigades as a terror group in July 2017, and were joined by the United Kingdom in December that year. In 2020, the United States under the Trump administration formally identified the al-Mukhtar Brigades as a terrorist organization, which some commentators have suggested may partially be in reward to the Bahrain–Israel normalization agreement.

== See also ==
- List of political parties in Bahrain
