= Al-Ashtar Brigades =

Shiite militant group

- سرايا الأشتر
- Dates active: 2012–present
- Allegiance: Iran (IRGC)
- Active regions: Bahrain
- Ideology: Shia Islamism; Khomeinism; Anti-Sunnism; Sectarianism; Anti-West
- Part of: Islamic Resistance in Bahrain; Axis of Resistance
- Wars: Iran–Israel proxy conflict Shia insurgency in Bahrain; Gaza war Middle Eastern crisis (2023–present)

The al-Ashtar Brigades (Saraya al-Ashtar, named after Malik al-Ashtar), or AAB for short, is the paramilitary branch of the Islamic Resistance in Bahrain, a Shia Islamist militant group designated as a terrorist organization by the governments of Bahrain, Egypt, Saudi Arabia, United Arab Emirates, United States, United Kingdom, and Canada.

== Terrorist designation ==
Country	Date	Ref
United Kingdom	22 December 2014	
Bahrain	June 2017	
Egypt	June 2017	
Saudi Arabia	June 2017	
United Arab Emirates	June 2017	
United States	July 2018	
Canada	2019	

In June 2017, the al-Ashtar Brigades was designated as a terrorist organization by Bahrain, Egypt, the UAE and Saudi Arabia. The United States Department of State has designated the group as a terrorist organization, as of July 2018. Canada classified the Brigades as a terrorist organization in 2019.

In March 2024, the U. S. Department of State designated the organization as a terrorist organization, stating that the group wants to destabilize and threaten the security of Bahrain.

== Ideology ==
The al-Ashtar Brigades has stated that it is loyal to the government of Iran, and has adopted branding consistent with the Iranian Revolutionary Guard Corps. The name "al-Ashtar" refers to Malik al-Ashtar, a figure revered within Shia Islam but believed by Sunni Muslims to have been involved in Othman's assassination. According to sources, this reflects the group's sectarian nature.

== Attacks ==
The group is suspected of over 20 attacks in Bahrain, primarily targeting police and security forces.

The first attack of the group was on May 29 of 2013, when a remote-controlled explosive device which blasts near police officers that they were removing a barricades in the village of Bani Jamra, Northern Governorate. The attack wounds at least seven officers. The authorities raised alarm bells over this attack, arresting ten militants the next day. On July 17, a car bomb blasts Shaikh Eisa Bin Salman Mosque in Riffa, Southern Governorate. The attack only left material damage. On the next month, a car bomb detonated in front a recreational area in Budaiya, Northern Governorate.

The group was designated a terrorist organization by Bahrain after the 2014 Daih bombing. Months later, on December 8, an improvised device blasts in Dumistan, Northern Governorate, killed a police officer. In the next day, an improvised device blasts in Karzakan, Northern governorate, killing a civilian and wounding other.

On January 31, 2015, a bomb blasts near a police patrol in Muqsha, wounding two officers. Two months later, the group claimed an attack in the settlement of Karrana, Northern Governorate, which left two officers wounded.

On January 14, 2017, after a pause of a year, members of Al-Ashtar Brigades attacked an officer in the village of Bani Jamra. The attack happens when authorities announces the execution of three militants. On January 29, an off duty security officer was killed by an AAB attack in Manama.

On May 2, 2024, the organization claimed to have launched a drone targeting the Israeli city of Eilat on April 27, targeting the headquarters of the company Trucknet "in support of the Palestinian cause and our resisting people in Gaza," during the Gaza war.

== See also ==
- List of political parties in Bahrain
