= Waad Allah Brigades =

Bahraini Shiite militant group

Wa'ad Allah Brigades
- Group: Martyrs of al-Quds Company
- Active regions: Bahrain
- Ideology: Khomeinism; Shia Islamism; Pro-Iran; Anti-West
- Status: Active
- Size: Unknown
- Part of: The Islamic Resistance in Bahrain
- Wars: Insurgency in Bahrain

Saraya Wa'ad Allah, also known as the Waad Allah Brigades, is a Bahraini Shiite militant group. The group currently is designated as a terrorist group by Canada, Bahrain, Egypt, Saudi Arabia, the U.S., the U.A.E, and Israel. The group has claimed responsibility for 3 attacks.

== Ideology ==
The group has stated its pro-Iran stance. The group has often criticized the U.S. for its involvement in the Middle East. The group has also declared to sabotage Israeli interests in Bahrain.
