= Northern Aleppo clashes (October 2022) =

Syrian civil war incidents

- Part of the inter-rebel conflict during the Syrian civil war
- Map of HTS's advance in Afrin
Date	10–19 October 2022 (1 week and 2 days)
Location	Aleppo Governorate, Syria
Result	Ceasefire
Territorial changes	HTS and allies temporarily capture Afrin, Jindires, and several villages.

Belligerents
(Syrian opposition) Hamza Division; Sultan Suleiman Shah Division; Ahrar al-Sham; Ahrar al-Sham Eastern Sector; Hay'at Tahrir al-Sham; Supported by: Sham Legion	Turkey (Syrian opposition) Hayat Thaeroon for Liberation	(Syrian opposition) Third Legion; (Syrian opposition) Levant Front; Jaysh al-Islam; (Syrian opposition) Liberation and Construction Movement; (Syrian opposition) Jaysh al-Sharqiya; (Syrian opposition) Farouq Brigades remnants; Nour al-Din al-Zenki Movement remnants

Casualties and losses
28 killed 1 killed Total: 29	Unknown	19 killed
- 10 civilians killed

Clashes occurred between the Levant Front and the Hamza Division, two factions of the Turkish-backed Syrian National Army, across the Turkish-occupied areas of the Aleppo Governorate on 10 October 2022, as part of the civil war in Syria. On 12 October, the Sunni Islamist group Hay'at Tahrir al-Sham (HTS) joined the fighting on the side of the Hamza Division, entering the Afrin region.

== Background ==
Clashes broke out between Ahrar al-Sham Eastern Sector and the Third Legion, which it had defected from, in June 2022.

On 7 October, gunmen shot and killed media activist Muhammad Abdul Latif, also known as Abu Ghannoum, and his wife in the city of al-Bab. The Third Legion, led by the Levant Front, found on 10 October that a group of Hamza Division fighters was responsible for the killing, sparking the clashes.

== Clashes ==
The Third Legion launched an attack on the Hamza Division on the evening of 10 October, expelling the Hamza Division from al-Bab and capturing the group's headquarters on the outskirts of the city. The next day, additional groups joined the fighting, including Hayat Tahrir al-Sham and the Sultan Suleiman Shah Division (al-Amshat) on the side of the Hamza Division, and the Liberation and Construction Movement and remnants of the Nour al-Din al-Zenki Movement on the side of the Third Legion. The Sham Legion opened the road between Afrin and the Idlib Governorate, allowing HTS to enter Afrin, taking control of Jindires on 12 October and entering Afrin city itself on 13 October. The Levant Front withdrew from Afrin towards Azaz. The Liberation and Construction Movement handed over their areas to HTS in exchange for safe passage.

Also on 13 October, HTS captured the villages of Sennarah, Anqalah and Marwaniyah in Sheikh Hadeed in the Afrin countryside and attacked the village of Kafr Jannah, but were beaten back by fighters of the Levant Front. Five HTS fighters were killed in the attack. Furthermore, a fighter of Ahrar al-Sham was killed in clashes with Jaysh al-Islam in Susyan town in Al-Bab countryside.

On 17 October, the temporary truce between HTS and the Third Legion broke down and heavy clashes resumed near both Afrin and Azaz, where HTS managed to capture more ground. On the same day, a fighter of the Levant Front was killed and another was injured in clashes with HTS fighters near the village of Al-Khalidiyah, near Sharran in the Afrin countryside. By 18 October, at least 58 people had been killed in the clashes.

Turkey deployed its armed forces to the area on 18 October. Hayat Thaeroon for Liberation stopped the infighting by separating HTS and the Third Legion fighters.

On 19 October the clashes ended as both sides reached a ceasefire agreement.

== Reactions ==
Protests and demonstrations were held across multiple opposition controlled towns in northern Syria, including Mare', Al-Bab, Azaz and Kaljibrin, against the entry of HTS to the region.

== See also ==
- Idlib Governorate clashes (June 2020)
- Tahrir al-Sham–Junud al-Sham conflict
