= Inter-rebel conflict during the Syrian civil war =

Internal conflict between Syrian opposition forces

Inter-rebel conflict during the Syrian Civil War
- Part of the Syrian civil war and al-Qaeda–Islamic State conflict
Date	December 12 2013 – 28 January 2017 (first phase, pre-HTS formation) (4 years, 6 months and 2 days); 28 January 2017 – 27 November 2024 (second phase, post-HTS formation)
Location	Syria
Result	Hay'at Tahrir al-Sham victory

Belligerents
Free Syrian Army (2014–2017); Jaysh al-Islam (2016–2017); Support: United States; Turkey; Qatar; Saudi Arabia; Syrian National Army (from 2017); National Front for Liberation; Syrian Liberation Front; Support: Turkey	Al-Nusra Front (2014–2017); Jund al-Aqsa (2014–2016); Ahrar al-Sham (2014–2016); Support: Qatar (sometimes); Saudi Arabia (sometimes); Turkey (sometimes); Hay'at Tahrir al-Sham (from 2017); Turkistan Islamic Party in Syria	So Be Steadfast Operations Room (from 2020); Hurras al-Din; Jama'at Ansar al-Islam (2020–2021); Ansar al-Din Front; Jihad Coordination; Ansar Fighters Brigade; Islamic State

Strength
(Syrian opposition) Free Syrian Army: 50,000 (Syrian opposition) Syrian National Army: 80,000 (2019)	Al-Nusra Front: 20,000 Hay'at Tahrir al-Sham: 15,000 (2022)	Hurras al-Din: 1,000–2,000

Casualties and losses
- 605 civilians killed 76 unidentified killed an additional 1,200 combatants and 150 civilians estimated killed Total: 5,641–6,991 killed (up until 28 June 2014)

The inter-rebel conflict during the Syrian Civil War has continued throughout the Syrian Civil War as factions of the Syrian opposition and Free Syrian Army have fought each other, with shifting alliances among various Islamist factions such as Al-Nusra Front, Ahrar al-Sham, Jaysh al-Islam and the Islamic Front.

== Background ==
=== Free Syrian Army–al-Nusra Front tensions ===
On 26 July 2012, FSA fighters stormed an outpost near a border crossing with Turkey in northern Syria manned by 40 foreign al-Qaeda fighters which held John Cantlie and several other journalists prisoners. The journalists escaped to the border crossing during the infighting and the al-Qaeda fighters fired at them.

The Free Syrian Army clashed with Jabhat al-Nusra on various occasions throughout 2013. In March 2013, the al-Nusra Front set up a checkpoint and captured 33 fighters from the Farouq Brigades in Tell Abyad. Heavy clashes erupted between the two groups which resulted in the Farouq commander, Abu Azzam, being wounded in action. He and other wounded rebels were transferred to a hospital in Şanlıurfa, Turkey. The next week, the 33 Farouq prisoners were released and the border crossing was reopened.

== Timeline of conflicts ==
=== Al-Qaeda–Free Syrian Army conflict 2014 to 2017 ===
==== Al-Nusra Front–SRF/Hazzm Movement conflict ====
In October 2014, al-Nusra Front, along with Jund al-Aqsa, clashed with the Syria Revolutionaries Front in Idlib. At the same time al-Nusra also attacked the Hazm Movement in Aleppo.

In January 2015, clashes between the Hazm Movement and al-Nusra spread from Aleppo to Idlib.

=== Southern Syria ===
Although the Southern Front of the Free Syrian Army have long cooperated with al-Qaeda in the ground against the Syrian government, ideological tensions between some of their factions brewed in 2014. Ahmad al-Nemeh formed the Daraa Military Council and was subsequently captured and tortured by Nusra as the latter threatened to arrest any member of this new coalition.

During the Quneitra offensive (June 2015), the Southern Front rejected any cooperation with al-Nusra, the Army of Conquest therefore participated in the operation separately.

In the Quneitra offensive (October 2015) both Jaish al-Fatah and the Southern Front claimed they captured the UN Hill in the area, later that month, the Southern Front and Nusra clashed in Daraa.

The al-Nusra Front clashed with the al-Rahman Legion in Zamalka, Markaz Rif Dimashq District in late July 2016 over a dispute of whom to carry out Friday prayers in one of the mosques of Zamalka town.

==== Idlib Governorate ====
On 22 December 2015, the al-Nusra Front attacked the headquarters of the Central Division at the Bab al-Hawa Border Crossing, resulting in clashes. The fighting was stopped by the intervention of Ahrar al-Sham.

In March 2016, there were several pro-FSA protests and demonstrations against the Syrian government throughout rebel-controlled territory in Syria. The al-Nusra Front attempted to crack down on the protests in Idlib, in response, the FSA's 13th Division raided al-Nusra's headquarter in Maarrat al-Nu'man. Al-Nusra retaliated by shelling Division 13's headquarter in the city. SOHR claimed that Jund al-Aqsa joined the conflict and established checkpoints in support of JaN. According to the 13th Division's media wing, their position was overran and 4 of their fighters were killed.

On 25 December 2016, 2 Free Idlib Army commanders were shot and killed in Maarat. Opposition activists accused Jund al-Aqsa of conducting the assassination. The next day, the al-Nusra Front raided houses throughout Idlib and captured 16 FIA fighters from the Mountain Hawks Brigade. The rebels were captured on charges of participating in the Turkish military intervention in Syria.

On 20 January 2017, major clashes erupted between the Army of Mujahideen and the al-Nusra Front in Atarib. Al-Nusra, along with the Nour al-Din al-Zenki Movement, also attacked the Levant Front in Haritan. Meanwhile, the Free Idlib Army also clashed with al-Nusra in Idlib.

On 5 April 2017, a vehicle carrying 2 Free Idlib Army commanders came under fire from Hayat Tahrir al-Sham fighters at a checkpoint near Khan al-Subul, which was under complete control of HTS. 2 FSA fighters, including a high-ranking commander, were killed in the shootout.

On 4 June 5 fighters of the Sham Legion were killed and 2 wounded after their vehicle hit a roadside bomb.

From 6–8 June, clashes broke out between Tahrir al-Sham and Sham Legion in Maarrat al-Nu'man. The 13th Division and the Free Police joined the fighting on 8 June. By the evening of 8 June, HTS captured both the 13th Division and the Sham Legion's headquarters in Maarat al-Nu'man and killed Col. Tayser al-Samahi, the brother of Col. Ali al-Samahi and the head of the Free Police in the town. On 9 June, Tahrir al-Sham announced the completion of their operations against the FSA and took full control of the town. Later that day, a ceasefire agreement was signed between the Free Idlib Army and Tahrir al-Sham in the town and the latter ordered the 13th Division to be disbanded.

=== Ahrar al-Sham, Jaysh al-Islam, and al-Qaeda conflict 2016 — 2017 ===
On 17 March 2016 Jund al-Aqsa members attempted to hold a mourning service at a tent for the death of an ISIL commander in Sarmin, Idlib Governorate. Ahrar ash-Sham fighters then entered the tent and forced them to end the ceremony, sparking a gunfight between the two groups. In response, Jund al-Aqsa fighters set up checkpoints in the town, intending to arrest Ahrar ash-Sham members.

On the same day or the next day, Abu Sakkar, an al-Nusra Front commander infamous for eating a dead Syrian soldier's heart when he was the commander of the Farouq Brigades in 2013, was stopped at an Ahrar ash-Sham checkpoint while driving on the road between the towns of Salqin and Harem. The Ahrar fighters attempted to arrest him when he resisted arrest and drove away toward Harem, resulting in a pursuit by the Ahrar militants. Upon reaching the town, Abu Sakkar attempted to reach for his gun and was fatally shot by his pursuers.

In September 2016 Jund al-Aqsa wounded an Ahrar al-Sham commander in the city of Ariha in a failed assassination attempt and in response, Ahrar al-Sham militants shot and killed 2 Jund al-Aqsa militants and surrounded the JaA headquarters in the city. A Jund al-Aqsa suicide bomber then detonated himself at the Ahrar headquarters and killed 3 others.

In October 2016, clashes broke out between the two groups as Jund al-Aqsa tried to storm Khan Shaykhun. Dozens of militants were killed on both sides while several fighters of Ahrar al-Sham were reportedly captured. Clashes between the two sides then escalated throughout the Idlib Governorate, with both sides expelling the other from several towns and villages. On 9 October, Jund al-Aqsa was expelled from 3 more villages in Idlib. Meanwhile, several other Islamist groups called upon fighters of the organisation to abandon it. The group reportedly pledged allegiance to Jabhat Fateh al-Sham which declared Jund al-Aqsa would be joining its ranks in order to end the infighting between rebel groups.

On 4 December 2016, during the 17th Aleppo offensive, the al-Nusra Front backed by the Abu Amara Battalions attacked warehouses held by Jaysh al-Islam in the rebel-held southeastern Aleppo. The former captured 2 Jaysh al-Islam fighters, including a commander.

In January 2017, the al-Nusra Front launched several coordinated attacks against Ahrar al-Sham headquarters and positions in the northern Idlib Governorate, near the Bab al-Hawa Border Crossing. In addition, al-Nusra also attacked Ahrar al-Sham outposts in Darkush and Jisr al-Shughur.

Between 26 April and 1 May 2017, more than 95 rebels were killed during clashes between Jaysh al-Islam, Tahrir al-Sham, and the Rahman Legion. Jaysh al-Islam fighters opened fire on demonstrators who called for an end to the infighting. The clashes led to Syrian Army advances in eastern Damascus.

On 29 May, Ahrar al-Sham reportedly executed at least 6 fighters of Tahrir al-Sham after capturing them in southern Idlib province.

Between 14 and 23 July 2017, clashes broke out between Tahrir al-Sham and Ahrar al-Sham in the Idlib area, resulting in Tahrir al-Sham taking full control of Idlib city and several towns in the governorate.

=== Free Syrian Army–Islamic Front conflict 2013 —2017 ===
==== Bab al-Hawa ====
In December 2013, the Islamic Front, mainly composing of Ahrar ash-Sham, took over several bases at the Bab al-Hawa Border Crossing from the Supreme Military Council and removed the FSA's revolutionary flags. The Islamist fighters captured some SMC guards and seized thousands of small arms and ammunition. As a result, the Islamic Front withdrew from the SMC.

==== Northern Aleppo ====
In August 2014, 800 fighters from the Islamic Front defected to FSA groups in the northern and eastern Aleppo Governorate. The defectors condemned the Islamic Front's Islamist and sectarian practices, especially against Christians and Alawites who initially supported the opposition.

In late November 2015, clashes took place between the Army of Revolutionaries, supported by the YPG, and the FSA-dominated Mare' Operations Room in the northern Aleppo Governorate, backed by Ahrar ash-Sham and the al-Nusra Front. However, both the YPG and al-Nusra denied involvement in the conflict.

In December the conflict between the Syrian Democratic Forces, mainly composing of the YPG and the Army of Revolutionaries and the Mare' Operations Room escalated in northern Aleppo. The latter called on Jaysh al-Thuwar to leave the SDF and sever relations with the PYD, while the former accused the latter of being led by Ahrar ash-Sham and Nusra.

On 26 March 2016, Ahrar ash-Sham ordered the anti-YPG Kurdish FSA group Liwa Ahfad Saladin to remove the flag of Kurdistan from their posts and threatened military action if they did not. However, Liwa Ahfad Saladin's commander denied the incident ever occurred and claimed Ahrar ash-Sham to be its ally.

On 27 September 2016, several Ahrar al-Sham fighters publicly burned a FSA flag in Azaz. The Ahrar al-Sham spokesman denied involvement and the incident sparked pro-FSA demonstrations in the city.

==== Rif Dimashq ====
In early March 2016 Jaysh al-Islam clashed with the al-Rahman Legion in Zamalka, Markaz Rif Dimashq District. The groups fought for control of a building in the suburbs, resulting in the latter group expelling the former from the building and the streets. The two groups also clashed over the recruitment of fighters from the Ajnad al-Sham Islamic Union. On 28 April, Legion, supported by the al-Nursa Front and Ahrar ash-Sham, attacked JaI in eastern Ghouta, however, Ahrar ash-Sham denied involvement. The Rahman Legion's Air Defense Brigade subsequently defected to Jaysh al-Islam. By 17 May, more than 500 fighters on both sides and a dozen civilians had been killed in the fighting in East Ghouta.

On 6 August 2017, 120 Ahrar al-Sham fighters in Arbin defected to the Rahman Legion after internal disputes. Ahrar al-Sham accused the Rahman Legion of seizing their weapons, while the Rahman Legion accused Ahrar al-Sham of their attempt to implement their "failed" experience from northern Syria in eastern Ghouta. Tahrir al-Sham reportedly sided with Ahrar al-Sham against the Sham Legion during the clashes. A ceasefire agreement between the Rahman Legion and Ahrar al-Sham was implemented on 9 August.

==== Greater Idlib area ====
Despite the majority of the Fastaqim Union joining Ahrar al-Sham in January 2017, some remnants of the former remained. On 11 May 2017, a former military commander of the group, Abu Hasanayn, was requested to a meeting in Idlib after coming from al-Bab. Once in Idlib, he was arrested by Ahrar al-Sham. The latter then demanded the remaining holdouts of the Fastaqim Union to surrender their weapons, leading to a clash. Less than an hour later, the Fastaqim headquarter was captured by Ahrar al-Sham. The incident was described as the "final nail in the coffin" for the group.

=== Infighting between Free Syrian Army groups ===
==== Northern Aleppo ====
On 2 November 2016, during the Aleppo offensive, Fastaqim Union fighters captured a military commander of the Nour al-Din al-Zenki Movement. In response, al-Zenki fighters attacked the Fastaqim Union's headquarters in the Salaheddine District of Aleppo. At least one rebel was killed and more than 25 wounded on both sides in the raid. The next day, the Levant Front and the Abu Amara Brigades began to patrol the streets to arrest any rebels taking part in the clashes. At least 18 rebels were killed in the infighting. The Zenki Movement and the Abu Amara Brigades eventually captured all positions of the Fastaqim Union in eastern Aleppo. Dozens of rebels from the latter group surrendered and were either captured, joined Ahrar al-Sham, or deserted.

==== Infighting between Turkish-backed FSA groups ====
On 14 November 2016, the Levant Front and the Sultan Murad Division clashed at the Azaz border gate with Kilis, Turkey. Ahrar al-Sham and the Nour al-Din al-Zenki Movement, a former member of the Levant Front, joined the fighting after they accused the Levant Front leaders of "acting like gangs". On 14 May 2017, two separate clashes in Jarabulus and Gandura pitted the Ahrar al-Sharqiya Brigade against the Sultan Murad Division and the Sham Legion. The fighting stopped after the intervention of the Turkish Army.

On 22 May 2017, the Levant Front attacked the Sham Legion near Azaz. The Levant Front accused the Sham Legion of conspiring with the Nour al-Din al-Zenki Movement, part of Tahrir al-Sham. The LF besieged the Sham Legion headquarters, captured a number of their fighters, and seized several ammunition dumps. Between 24 and 25 May 5 FSA factions including the Levant Front, the Hamza Division, and the Sultan Murad Division conducted a joint attack on the Revolutionary Knights Brigade between Azaz and al-Rai and captured more than 20 of their fighters, in addition to killing and wounding at least 10. The FSA factions accused the Revolutionary Knights Brigade of affiliation to the Nour al-Din al-Zenki Movement and Tahrir al-Sham and partaking in smuggling, looting, extortion, and abuses of civilians.

On 8 August 2017, clashes erupted between the Sham Legion and the Freedom Brigade on Turkmen Mountain in the northern Latakia countryside.

=== Infighting between Ahrar al-Sham and Jaysh al-Islam ===
In November 2014, 30 fighters from Ahrar al-Sham raided Jaysh al-Islam positions at the Bab al-Hawa border crossing, causing the JaI fighters to abandon their posts and flee. The crossing was later returned to Jaysh al-Islam.

=== Jaish al-Fustat-Jaysh al-Islam conflict ===
The East Ghouta inter-rebel conflict (April–May 2016) was an armed conflict between the rebel coalition of Jaish al-Fustat, consisting of the al-Nusra Front and al-Rahman Legion, and the rebel group Jaysh al-Islam, that occurred in the rebel-held territories east of Damascus. Tensions between the two groups took place since March 2016, when the Rahman Legion expelled Jaysh al-Islam in Zamalka after absorbing the Ajnad al-Sham Islamic Union in February.

The East Ghouta inter-rebel conflict (April–May 2017) was an armed conflict between the rebel groups Tahrir al-Sham (formerly al-Nusra) and al-Rahman Legion on one side, and the rebel group Jaysh al-Islam on the other, which took place in the rebel-held territories east of Damascus.

==== Ahrar al-Sham against al-Nusra ====
The Idlib Governorate clashes (January–March 2017) were military confrontations between rebel factions led by Ahrar al-Sham and their allies on one side and Jabhat Fatah al-Sham (later as Tahrir al-Sham) and their allies on the other. After 7 February, the clashes also included Jund al-Aqsa as a third belligerent, which had re-branded itself as Liwa al-Aqsa and was attacking the other combatants. The battles were fought in the Idlib Governorate and the western countryside of the Aleppo Governorate.

=== Further SLF/NFL–HTS conflicts ===
==== 2018 ====
Clashes broke out between Tahrir al-Sham and the Syrian Liberation Front during February 2018, the latter backed by the Suqour al-Sham Brigades. A ceasefire was declared in April, by which time SLF and its allies had conquered considerable territory in Idlib and Aleppo provinces.

==== 2019 ====
However, fighting between the two groups began once again in January 2019, whereby Tahrir al-Sham captured the northern town of Darat Izza and moved to envelop the Nour al-Din al-Zenki (part of the SLF) stronghold east of Aleppo city.

=== Syrian National Army ===
The Syrian National Army (SNA), often known as the Turkish-backed Free Syrian Army, operates under the four-year-old Turkish occupation of northern Syria. A coalition of many rebel factions, these have maintained their own structures while working under the SNA umbrella. The SNA has been criticised for the many human rights abuses visited on civilians (including seizure of property) in areas they control, and the different factions are prone to sporadic infighting (often resulting in civilian casualties), usually over what they regard as the spoils of war or other sources of income, such as control of border crossings. Turkish threats to withhold wages are used to restore order among the factions. The infighting has been one of the reasons that former supporters of the SNA return to regime-held areas, and that some SNA fighters surrender to the SDF.

In October 2022, the Third Legion, which was made up of the Levant Front and Jaysh al-Islam, clashed with the Hamza Division, which was supported by the Sultan Suleiman Shah Brigade (SSSB), after members of the Hamza Division were found to have killed an activist and his pregnant wife in early October. The Hamza Division and SSSB were forced out of their headquarters. HTS intervened in the Hamza Division's favor, while the Liberation and Construction Movement supported the Third Legion. This resulted in the Third Legion being removed from Afrin. A ceasefire deal was briefly reached, though it failed and HTS moved on Azaz. Turkey deployed its armed forces to the area on 18 October, as did the Hayat Thaeroon for Liberation.

The Al-Shahba Gathering fought against the Third Legion and the Sultan Murad Division in September 2023 over control of the al-Hamran crossing, which resulted in injuries and deaths on both sides.

== See also ==
- List of armed groups in the Syrian Civil War
