= Hayat Thaeroon for Liberation =

Militant group

- Leader: Fahim Issa
- Dates active: 23 January 2022 – 29 January 2025
- Groups: Sultan Murad Division; Al-Muntasir Billah Division; Sham Legion (Northern Aleppo branch); Levant Revolutionaries Battalions; Northern Brigade; 9th Division; Mu'tasim Division; Special Forces Division; Al-Rahman Legion (from April 2022); Sultan Malek Shah (from July 2022); Al-Waqas Brigade (from October 2022); Hamza Division (left in July 2022); Sultan Suleiman Shah Division (left in July 2022); Elite Brigade (left in August 2022); Ahrar al-Sham Eastern Sector (joined in May 2022, left in February 2023); Northern Falcons Brigade (left to join the Levant Front in May 2024); 112th Brigade (component of Jaysh al-Ahfad, left in June 2024); Samarkand Brigade (joined in October 2022, left in June 2024
- Part of: (Syrian opposition) Syrian National Army
- Wars: Syrian civil war

The Hayat Thaeroon for Liberation, also known as the Second Legion, was a Turkish-backed merger of opposition groups in Northern Syria during the Syrian civil war.

The group was deployed to Kafr Jana in October 2022 to keep the peace after clashes broke out between rival factions and an attempted ceasefire failed.

== History ==
One of the mergers's precursors, named the Thaeroon Movement, was formed in October 2021 and included members of the Azm Operations Room. Specific groups included the northern sector of the Sham Legion, the Sultan Murad Division, the First Division, the Al-Muntasir Billah Division, and the Sham Revolutionaries in addition to Liwa al-Shamal, Ninth Division and Liwa 112. The other faction in the merger was the Syrian Front for Liberation.

The Sultan Suleiman Shah Division had left the Azm Operations Room in August 2021, but it returned to the Hayat Thaeroon for Liberation in November 2021. The Sultan Suleiman Shah Division and the Hamza Division left in July 2022.

The Ahrar al-Sham Eastern Sector joined Hayat Thaeroon on 24 May 2022.

Liwa al-Safwa left Hayat Thaeroon in August 2022 and joined the Third Legion.

Clashes took place in northern Aleppo Governorate in October 2022, which were sparked by the killing of an opposition activist and his pregnant wife in al-Bab by Hamza Division fighters. The factions involved were the Sultan Suleiman Shah Brigade, Hamza Division, Ahrar al-Sham and Hay'at Tahrir al-Sham on one side, and the Third Legion (Levant Front and Jaysh al-Islam), and the Liberation and Construction Movement on the other. The Hayat Thaeroon for Liberation intervened as a peacekeeping force on the orders of the Turkish National Intelligence Organization. Turkish forces arrived on 18 October.

The factions of the group largely referred to themselves as the Second Legion by 2023.

== Leadership ==
Aladdin Ayoub, who was also known as Al-Farouq Abu Bakr, serves as a member of the "leadership council" of the group.
