= Fahim Issa =

Syrian military officer

- فهيم عيسى; Fehim İsa

Deputy Minister of Defense for the Northern Region
- Incumbent
- Assumed office 12 April 2025
- President: Ahmed al-Sharaa
- Minister: Murhaf Abu Qasra

Personal details
- Born: Tal al-Hawa, Aleppo, Syria

Military service
- Allegiance: Syria (since 2025); Syrian opposition (2011–2024); Syrian National Army (until 2025)
- Rank: Brigadier General
- Battles/wars: Syrian Civil War

Fahim Issa (Arabic: فهيم عيسى, Turkish: Fehim İsa) is a Syrian military officer serving as the Deputy Minister of Defense for the Northern Region since April 2025. He was a prominent figure in the Syrian National Army and previously held several leadership positions within Syrian opposition forces.

== Early life and background ==
Issa was born in the village of Tal al-Hawa, near the town of Al-Rai in northeastern Aleppo Governorate, an area with a predominantly Syrian Turkmen population. He himself is a Turkmen.

He started his career as a cobbler in Aleppo city, before later getting involved in armed conflict.

== Syrian civil war ==
With the outbreak of the Syrian uprising in 2011, Issa joined the armed opposition and played a central role in the establishment of the Sultan Murad Division, a faction primarily composed of Syrian Turkmen fighters. He commanded the division in various battles, including engagements against the Syrian Democratic Forces, the Assad regime, and the Islamic State (ISIL). He also participated in Turkish-backed military operations such as Operation Euphrates Shield, Operation Olive Branch, and Operation Peace Spring.

In 2022, Issa was appointed commander of the Second Corps of the Turkish-backed Syrian National Army, following his leadership of the unified military structure Hayat Thaeroon for Liberation, which was formed through the merger of several factions. Prior to this, he served as deputy commander of the Azm Operations Room, established the previous year.

Issa was widely regarded as the closest ally of Mohammed al-Jassem (Abu Amsha), then-leader of the Sultan Suleiman Shah Division, and intervened in his defense during al-Jassem’s detention by the Azm Operations Room on charges of corruption.

He was also described as one of Turkey’s most trusted figures in Syria, contributing significantly to the deployment of fighters to both Libya and Azerbaijan, in support of Turkish military operations during their involvement in Liby and their support of Azerbaijan in the Nagorno-Karabakh conflict. He was reportedly also responsible for sending fighters to Niger, Burkina Faso, and Nigeria in Western Africa.

In 2023, as commander of the Second Corps, Issa led an offensive against Hay'at Tahrir al-Sham (HTS), though the campaign did not achieve its objectives, which subsequently diminished his public visibility.

In November 2024, an HTS-led coalition launched Operation Deterrence of Aggression against the forces of Bashar al-Assad, culminating in the collapse of his regime on 8 December 2024. Shortly after the operation began, the Syrian National Army initiated Operation Dawn of Freedom, during which Issa served as a commander within the Sultan Murad Division.

== Government role ==
On 12 April 2025, Issa was appointed Deputy Minister of Defense for the Northern Region under Minister Murhaf Abu Qasra. His role focuses on military and administrative affairs in northern Syria amidst a wide restructuring effort in the aftermath of the fall of the Assad regime.

== Controversies ==
Prisons operated by the Sultan Murad Division under Issa's leadership were reportedly associated with serious allegations, including psychological and physical abuse, death threats, and incidents of sexual violence. The Division was also reportedly known to recruit and deploy child soldiers.

In 2021, Issa posted on Twitter expressing support for the "Turkification" of Syria, envisioning a future in which a free Syria would be Turkish-speaking and join the Organization of Turkic States.

In March 2024, Issa took part in a rally held in Al-Rai commemorating the thirteenth anniversary of the beginning of the Syrian revolution. During the event, he held a sign directed at Ahmed al-Sharaa (then known as Abu Mohammed al-Julani), the leader of Hay'at Tahrir al-Sham (HTS), that read: "Hey Julani, we do not want you—neither you nor your master Bashar". The stance came at a time when demonstrations were taking place in northwestern Syria (territory then controlled by HTS) demanding the resignation of al-Julani. The image of Issa holding the sign later resurfaced and generated controversy after his appearance at the Presidential Palace in Damascus during the Revolution Victory Conference in January 2025.

== See also ==
- Military of Syria
- Turkish involvement in the Syrian civil war
