= 62nd Division (Syria) =

- Active: 2025–present
- Country: Syria
- Branch: Syrian Army
- Area of responsibility: Hama Governorate
- Engagements: Western Syria clashes; March 2025 Western Syria clashes; 2025 massacres of Syrian Alawites; Druze insurgency in Southern Syria (2025–present); Southern Syria clashes (July 2025–present)

Commanders
- Current commander: Muhammad al-Jassem

The 62nd Division of the Syrian Army, established under the Syrian Transitional Government, is responsible for the Hama Governorate. It is mostly made up of personnel originating from the Turkish-backed Sultan Suleiman Shah Division (also known as “Amshat”), which operated within the Syrian National Army (SNA).

== History ==
=== Background ===
The Sultan Suleiman Shah division was among the most prominent factions receiving Turkish support, and also operated alongside the Turkish army in several operations against Kurdish forces in northern Syria during the civil war. The group is said to have committed severe human right violations against Kurdish civilians, including kidnappings, murder, and torture.

=== Involvement in sectarian strife, massacres, and human rights abuses ===
The division was involved in the 2025 massacres of Syrian Alawites. During the massacre, several combatants reportedly referred to themselves as members of the Suleiman Shah Division or displayed insignia bearing the group's former name in social media posts, despite having already been incorporated into the 62nd Division. On 7 March, pro-SNA Telegram channels circulated a video showing four armed men standing among at least ten bodies of individuals who appeared to have been executed. The man recording the footage identified himself as a member of the Suleiman Shah Division.

The division took part in the clashes against Druze militias in Suwayda.

== Structure ==
The commander of the division is the former leader of the Sultan Suleiman Shah Division, Muhammad al-Jassem (Abu Amasha), who is under sanctions by the United States Department of the Treasury for having engaged in abductions, extortion, forced displacement, harassment and property confiscation, particularly targeting the Kurds of Afrin. On 28 May 2025, the Council of the European Union sanctioned him and his faction for his involvement in the 2025 massacres of Syrian Alawites. He is considered a close friend of Saif al-Din Boulad, the commander of the 76th Division. Many senior commanders in the division are al-Jassem's associates and family members.

Other high-ranking members of the division include: Chief of Staff Abu Bara’a, Commander of the Field intelligence Regiment Hadhir Khaled Al-Akhdab, Operations Officer Abu Al-Qasem Al-Homsi, Operations Officer Abd Al-Jabbar Al-Abed (Abu Shamil), Operations Officer in the 444th Brigade Abu Ma'ruf Al-Shami Al-Suri, and member of the 444th Brigade Sa'id Al-Khattab

The division controls at least eight subordinate brigades:

- 2nd Brigade (led by Muhammad al-Damalhi (Abu Ibrahim))
- 101st Brigade (led by Saif al-Jassem)
- 102nd Brigade
- 103rd Brigade (led by Basel ‘Amasha)
- 105th Brigade (led by Fadi Al-Jassem)
- 106th Brigade (led by Younes Al-Jassem)
- 444th Brigade (led by Malek Al-Jassem (Abu Saraj))
- Security Unit
