= 2022 Ahrar al-Sham–Levant Front clashes =

Conflict

- Part of the inter-rebel conflict during the Syrian civil war
Date	18–20 June 2022 (2 days)
Location	Aleppo Governorate, Turkish-occupied northern Syria
Result	Status quo ante bellum
Territorial changes	Levant Front captures Tall Battal and Abla from Ahrar al-Sham, then withdraws to their outskirts; Ahrar al-Sham and Tahrir al-Sham (HTS) capture Basouta, Jindires, al-Muhammadiya, al-Ghazawiya and its crossing, Qarzihil, and Ain Dara from Levant Front and Sham Legion; HTS withdraws from Ain Dara park and Qarzihil; HTS withdraws from all recently captured settlements after Turkish negotiations

Belligerents
Ahrar al-Sham; Ahrar al-Sham Eastern Sector; Syrian Salvation Government; Hayat Tahrir al-Sham	Third Legion; Levant Front; Jaysh al-Islam; Sham Legion

Casualties and losses
- 4–5 fighters killed Dozens of fighters wounded 4 civilians killed 11 civilians injured Total: 8–9 killed, 11+ wounded

Clashes took place between Ahrar al-Sham and the Levant Front, two factions of the Turkish-backed Syrian National Army, across the Turkish-occupied areas of the Aleppo Governorate in June 2022, as part of the on-going civil war in Syria. Ahrar al-Sham was supported by Hayat Tahrir al-Sham (HTS) from the latter's territories in the Idlib Governorate, while the Sham Legion and Jaysh al-Islam backed the Levant Front.

== Clashes ==
The purported casus belli was the defection of the 32nd Division, part of Ahrar al-Sham's eastern branch, from the Levant Front-dominated Third Legion of the SNA. Following this defection, the Levant Front, including reinforcements of tanks and artillery from Azaz city, attacked Ahrar al-Sham positions in the al-Bab District countryside on 18 June, besieging the Ahrar al-Sham-held Kurdish-majority villages of Tall Battal and Abla before proceeding to storm and capture Ahrar al-Sham's headquarters in the villages. The two fighting factions then withdrew to the outskirts of the villages. At least one Ahrar al-Sham fighter was killed, and four civilians, including two children, were killed, and 11 civilians wounded during the clashes in the al-Bab countryside, which had spread to the villages of Sousian, al-Hadath, Alwan, and Sheikh Alwan.

In response to the clashes, the Sham Legion and the Syrian National Army closed the al-Ghazawiya and Deir Ballut crossings which link the SNA and HTS areas of control between Afrin District and the Idlib Governorate. However, HTS then captured the al-Ghazawiya crossing after the Sham Legion withdrew. The HTS and Ahrar al-Sham convoy, consisting of technicals with heavy machine guns, artillery, and armoured personnel carriers, advanced north into the Jindires and Afrin subdistricts, capturing Jindires and the villages of Basouta, al-Muhammadiya, al-Ghazawiya, Qarzihil, and Ain Dara. Qarzihil saw the heaviest fighting.

Turkey then brokered a ceasefire between the fighting factions. The agreement stipulated that the HTS convoy withdraw from the areas it captured in Afrin, and the return of Ahrar al-Sham's headquarters in al-Bab. All HTS fighters left Qarzihil village and Ain Dara park and regrouped in Basouta and Deir Ballut, near Darat Izza. Despite the truce, Ahrar al-Sham attacked Levant Front bases in Tall Battal. By the morning of 19 June, fighting had ceased in all of the areas with the exception of Sousian village in al-Bab.
