= Al-Shahba Gathering =

Militant group

- Leader: Hussein Assaf
- Dates active: 2 February 2023– 4 April 2024
- Groups: Ahrar al-Sham Eastern Sector; Ahrar al-Tawhid (50th Division); Nour al-Din al-Zenki Movement (left to integrate into the SNA structure in February 2024)
- Active regions: Aleppo Governorate, Syria
- Size: Over 7,000
- Part of: (Syrian opposition) Syrian National Army (denied by the Syrian Interim Government); Unified Force
- Wars: Syrian civil war

The Al-Shahba Gathering was a coalition of Syrian rebel groups in Aleppo Governorate, Syria that was involved in Inter-rebel conflict during the Syrian civil war.

== Background ==
The Nour al-Din al-Zenki Movement, which had been severely weakened by Hay'at Tahrir al-Sham in 2019, formed the "Kataeb Bloc", which became the nucleus of the Al-Shahba Gathering.

Ahrar al-Sham Eastern Sector, under the command of Hassan Soufan, defected from the Third Legion. Ahrar al-Tawhid, which included the "al-Fatah Brigade, al-Qawa 55, First Central, Free 322 Brigade, 5th Battalion, Brigade 343, and the Sultan Othman Brigade", was formed in December 2022 as a continuation of Liwa al-Tawhid, which had merged into the Levant Front.

== History ==
=== 2023 ===
The faction originally included Ahrar al-Sham Eastern Sector, Ahrar al-Tawhid (50th Division) and Nour al-Din al-Zenki Movement, with the Azaz Falcons Brigade joining days later. Most of the groups were originally part of the Levant Front, with the exception of Ahrar al-Sham Eastern Sector.

Six groups from the Northern Storm Brigade also defected to the Al-Shahba Gathering.

The coalition fought against the Third Legion and the Sultan Murad Division in September 2023 over control of the al-Hamran crossing, which resulted in injuries and deaths on both sides.

The group was allied with Hay'at Tahrir al-Sham.

=== 2024 ===
The Al-Shahba Gathering dissolved itself in 2024 and became part of the Levant Front.
