= Sayf Bulad =

Syrian commander

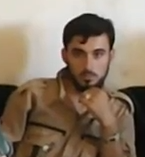
- Sayf Bulad in 2013
- Born: c. 1988 (age 37–38); Bizaah, Aleppo Governorate, Syria
- Military career
- Allegiance: Syria (2025–present); Syrian opposition (2015–2024); Islamic State (2012–2015); Ba'athist Syria (until 2012)
- Branch: Syrian Air Force; Air Force Intelligence Directorate; Free Syrian Army; Syrian National Army; Syrian Front for Liberation
- Service years: 2005–present
- Rank: First Lieutenant (Air Force Intelligence Directorate); Brigadier General (Hamza Division); Brigadier General (Syrian Army)
- Nickname: "The Turkmen commander"
- Units: Abu Bakr Sadiq Brigades; Al-Tawhid Brigade; Hazzm Movement; Hamza Division
- Commands: (Syria) 76th Division
- Conflicts: Syrian civil war; Battle of Aleppo (2012–2016); Inter-rebel conflict; Operation Euphrates Shield; Operation Olive Branch; Northwestern Syria offensive (April–August 2019); Second Nagorno-Karabakh War

Sayf al-Din Bulad (Arabic: سيف أبو بكر; Turkish: Seyf Polat; born 1988), better known as Sayf Bulad and also known by his nom de guerre Sayf Abu Bakr, (Note: He is also known as "Seyf Ebubekir Polat" and "Sayf Boulad Abu Bakr". His given name has been written variously as "Sayf", "Seyf", "Saif", and "Seif", and his nom du guerre as "Abu Bakr" and "Ebu Bekir".) is a Syrian military officer and former rebel leader who rose to prominence fighting for several armed opposition factions in the Syrian civil war.

Having served with the Free Syrian Army during the conflict's early stages, he reportedly joined the Islamic State of Iraq and the Levant (ISIL) in 2013, possibly as a spy for the Turkish intelligence. Bulad defected from ISIL in 2014, and consequently became a commander of the CIA-supported Hazzm Movement and later the Hamza Division.

In September 2021, he became the deputy leader of the Syrian Front for Liberation. As part of these groups, Bulad has become an important ally of Turkey within the armed Syrian opposition, and has served as the de facto military governor of al-Bab since 2017 as well.

== Biography ==
=== Early role in the civil war ===
Sayf Bulad is an ethnic Syrian Turkmen from Bizaah, Aleppo Governorate. According to the news site El-Dorar, he was originally a First Lieutenant in the Syrian Army and defected to the opposition when the Syrian civil war erupted. Turkish government-owned TRT World reported that he was an officer in the Air Force Intelligence Directorate for 7 years until he defected in 2011. According to Muhammad al-Binshi, he initially joined the Abu Bakr Sadiq Brigades, a "moderate" rebel group, in the early insurgency phase of the Syrian civil war. Later in 2012, he had become a "gunman" serving in the Islamist al-Tawhid Brigade, taking part in the Battle of Aleppo. By spring 2013, he fought as part of the Free Syrian Army in operations around Kuweires Military Aviation Institute.

In summer 2013, Sayf Bulad fought in a rebel group alongside ISIL against Kurdish paramilitary factions such as the People's Protection Units (YPG) in the northern Aleppo countryside. In one instance, he appeared in an ISIL propaganda video in which prisoners of war, labeled as "PKK members," were presented at a mosque in Qabasin. The video showed how an ISIL member, with Sayf Bulad at his side, was talking to the prisoners and giving them "a lesson in 'repentance'". According to analyst Nicholas Heras, by mid-2013 ISIL had become so powerful in the region around al-Bab that many local insurgents joined the organization, including Sayf Bulad and other members of his family. His exact motivations for doing so remain unknown. An intelligence insider told Heras, however, that Sayf Bulad was actually an agent of the Turkish intelligence service MİT who acted as spy within ISIL. In any case, Sayf Bulad reportedly became an "important aide" to the local ISIL commander, acting as liaison between the organization and other rebels. He reportedly played a major role in consolidating ISIL's grip on the area of al-Bab and its surroundings. His service with ISIL lasted until the first half of 2014, when he and members of his family defected and fled to Turkey. Based on information gathered by Heras, researcher Aymenn Jawad Al-Tamimi argued that Sayf Bulad's escape to Turkey might have resulted from ISIL discovering that he was working for Turkish intelligence. In contrast, his later unit – the Hamza Division – would claim that Sayf Bulad had never served ISIL and had been actually imprisoned by the organization in Aleppo's al-Uyun hospital in the time from 2013 to 2014, before being rescued by other rebel factions. (Note: The Hamza Division is the only source completely denying Sayf Bulad's involvement in ISIL. Despite the "murky" details of the events around 2013/14, Nicholas Heras argued that his source was trustworthy and that Sayf served as ISIL member, although factually as Turkish undercover agent. After initially finding no evidence for Sayf's ISIL membership, Aymenn Jawad Al-Tamimi later stated that Heras' information about Sayf Bulad being a spy within ISIL made sense. Journalists Colin P. Clarke, Ahmet S. Yayla, Wladimir van Wilgenburg, and Mehdi Hasan also described Sayf as former ISIL member.)

By late 2014, Sayf Bulad was back in Syria and had risen to sub-commander in the Hazzm Movement, a rebel group vetted and supported by the CIA. At the time, he fought at al-Ma'amal. Aymenn Jawad Al-Tamimi speculated that Sayf Bulad's rapid rise within the Hazzm Movement despite previous interactions with ISIL could have been due to connections with the Turkish intelligence. As part of the Hazzm Movement, he fought in Aleppo's Industrial City and Handarat in late 2014.

=== Leader of the Hamza Division ===
He officially joined the Hamza Brigade around 2015, although he had already been connected to the group beforehand, acting as one of its recruiters in Aleppo. Around 2015, he was possibly part of the United States Armed Forces' Syrian Train and Equip Program at the invitation of Turkey. Although initially one among several sub-commanders of the Hamza Brigade, he was promoted to its overall leader after the death of its previous commander, Yasser Abu al-Sheikh in early 2016. He consequently became the leader of the Hamza Division which was a merger of the Hamza Brigade with several other groups, organized in April 2016. As overall commander, Sayf Bulad organized a "special forces" elite unit within the Hamza Division.

He was also promoted to brigadier general, and led his forces during the Turkish-led Operation Euphrates Shield against ISIL. Around this time, he increasingly became "a prominent public face" of the anti-ISIL campaign waged by Turkey and its Syrian allies. After al-Bab was captured from ISIL in March 2017, Sayf Bulad was appointed de facto military governor of the city and its surroundings by Turkey. Meanwhile, the Hamza Division became part of the Syrian National Army (SNA) as the "Second Division", with Sayf Bulad overseeing the unit's further expansion and improvement in training. In May 2018, his brother Hamed Balud (alias "Yaba") was involved in a scandal as he and other Hamza Division fighters attacked three hospitals in and around al-Bab, possibly to terrorize local supporters of ISIL and the Syrian Democratic Forces (SDF). Hamed was filmed and subsequently arrested, but managed to escape. The affair surrounding his brother caused considerable local opposition against the Hamza Division and Sayf Bulad, as he had personally appointed Hamad to run al-Bab's administration. In spite of the scandal, Sayf was able to maintain his position thanks to Turkish support.

Sayf Bulad later fought against the SDF in Operation Olive Branch, assisting in the conquest of the PYD-governed Afrin Canton. According to Heras, Sayf and the Hamza Division caused considerable ethnic tensions during and after the capture of Afrin, as they favored Turkmen. However, Sayf was reportedly awarded a personal audience with Turkish President Recep Tayyip Erdoğan for his role in Afrin. According to Heras, "there [was] a definite sense within the opposition movement" by 2018 that Sayf was factually far more powerful within the SNA as his formal rank would suggest, thanks to the "patronage of Turkey". Sayf led his unit during the Northwestern Syria offensive (April–August 2019), publicly declaring that rebel rocket attacks on Nubl and al-Zahraa were meant as retribution for government bombardments of Idlib and Hama.

In 2020, he helped to recruit 500 Hamza Division fighters who allegedly served in the Second Nagorno-Karabakh War, fighting for Azerbaijan against Armenia. At the time, The Daily Beast published an article which portrayed Sayf Bulad as an "ISIS Warlord" who had fought for the Jihadist movement for several years before defecting to Turkey. Large parts of this story were consequently debunked by Aymenn Jawad Al-Tamimi, prompting the Daily Beast to correct the article.

In September 2021, Sayf Bulad was appointed deputy commander of the Syrian Front for Liberation, an umbrella formation of several groups within the SNA. In this position, he would serve under Mutasim Abbas, leader of the Mu'tasim Division.

Bulad and the Hamza Division were sanctioned by the United States Department of the Treasury's Office of Foreign Assets Control in August 2023 over human rights violations.

=== Post-Assad era ===
In March 2025, the Syrian Defense Ministry, under the new government of Ahmed al-Sharaa, made Sayf Bulad the commander of the newly established 76th Division of the Syrian Armed Forces.

On 28 May 2025, the Council of the European Union sanctioned him and his faction for his involvement in the 2025 massacres of Syrian Alawites. On 19 December 2025, he was sanctioned by the United Kingdom for his involvement in the March 2025 clashes and "historic violence committed during the Syrian Civil War".

== See also ==
- List of Syrian defectors
