= Levant Revolutionaries Battalions =

Former militant group

- Kataeb Thuwar al-Sham
- Leaders: Naji Mustafa; Hossam Abu Yaseen
- Dates active: April 2015-June 2016; July 2016-January 2025
- Active regions: Aleppo Governorate, Syria
- Part of: Free Syrian Army (2015-2017): Levant Front (January-July 2016); Mujahideen Army (2016-2017); Fatah Halab (2015-2017); Ahrar al-Sham (2017-2018); Nour al-Din al-Zenki Movement (2018-2019); Syrian National Army (2019-2025): National Front for Liberation (2019-2025); Hayat Thaeroon for Liberation (2021-2025)
- Wars: Syrian civil war

The Levant Revolutionaries Battalions (LRB) was a faction in Syria during the Syrian civil war.

== History ==
The group was formed by Naji Mustafa (a former commander in the Army of Mujahideen) as a split from the Levant Front, which he and others left in April 2015. The LRB has been described as having been "cobbled together" between the Army of Mujahideen groups as well as smaller factions that were aligned with the Free Syrian Army.

It was one of the many Syrian rebel groups armed with BGM-71 TOW missiles by the CIA that autumn.

The LRB announced in June 2016 that it would merge with the Levant Front. By July, many members of the LRB had separated from the Levant Front again and become independent.

Mustafa left in 2016 with 200 fighters and was made a spokesman of the National Front for Liberation by June 2021.

The group merged with Ahrar al-Sham in January 2017. In January 2018, the Levant Revolutionaries announced the integration into the Nour al-Din al-Zenki Movement, defecting from Ahrar al-Sham in the process.

In January 2019, the Nour al-Din al-Zenki Movement came under heavy attack by Hay'at Tahrir al-Sham, which captured most of the towns held by the group in Idlib. Most of the members of Nour al-Din al-Zenki either dissolved or fled into the Turkish-held Afrin region. The LRB was forced into a deal with HTS, agreeing to dissolve and give up control of the town of Atarib, though around 100 fighters would escape to the Afrin. Several months later, a new batch of LRB fighters was announced to have graduated from a rebel training camp as part of the National Front for Liberation, implying the group continued to operate in some capacity in the Greater Idlib region, despite the agreement with HTS to dissolve.

In October 2021, the SNA's Azm Unified Command Room announced the formation of a new operations room under its command, known as the Revolutionaries Movement. Eventually, the Revolutionaries movement would merge with the Syrian Front for Liberation in January 2022, forming Hayat Thaeroon for Liberation.

In June 2024, several LRB fighters were killed by artillery shelling by government forces on the western-Aleppo frontline.
