= Liberation and Construction Movement =

Militant group

- Harakat al-Tahrir wal-Binaa
- Leaders: Abu Hatem Shaqra (January 2024 - January 2025); Hussein al-Hammadi (February 2022 - January 2024); Abu Arab (military leader)
- Dates active: 15 February 2022 – 29 January 2025
- Groups: Ahrar al-Sharqiya; Jaysh al-Sharqiya; 20th Division; Suqour al-Sham-Eastern Sector
- Active regions: Aleppo Governorate, Syria
- Part of: (Syrian opposition) Syrian National Army: Dawn of Freedom Operations Room
- Wars: Syrian civil war

The Liberation and Construction Movement (LCM) was a Turkish-backed coalition of various groups in Aleppo Governorate, Syria during the Syrian civil war.

As part of the merger of former Syrian National Army factions into the newly formed Syrian Army, the Liberation and Construction Movement's military leader Raed al-Arab (Abu Arab) was made the commander of the newly formed 118th Armored Division. Former leader Abu Hatem Shaqra serving as commander of the 86th Division of the Syrian Army.

== History ==
=== 2022 ===
The faction was formed as a coalition between Ahrar al-Sharqiya, Jaysh al-Sharqiya, the 20th Division, and Suqour al-Sham-Eastern Sector in February 2022.

The coalition sided with the Levant Front and Jaysh al-Islam against the Hamza Division and Sultan Suleiman Shah Division during the Northern Aleppo clashes in October 2022, with the civil conflict ending in a mediated stalemate.

=== 2024 ===
The LCM took part in Operation Dawn of Freedom alongside various other Syrian National Army factions against the Syrian Democratic Forces, and the Syrian Government to a lesser degree, successfully taking control of most of Manbij and its surrounding territory.

It also participated in the Manbij offensive.
