= Northern Storm Brigade =

Syrian rebel group

- لواء عاصفة الشمال; Liwa Asifat al-Shamal
- The logo used by the group
- Leaders: Mahmoud Naddom; Ammar Ibrahim Dadikhi †; Samir Amouri (former)
- Dates active: 2011 – 2025
- Groups: Azaz Falcons Brigade (left to join the Al-Shahba Gathering in May 2023); Martyr Ibrahim Radwan Battalion (left to join the Al-Shahba Gathering in May 2023); the Masaab Abu az-Zuber Battalion (left to join the Al-Shahba Gathering in May 2023); Muthanna Battalion (left to join the Al-Shahba Gathering in May 2023)
- Headquarters: Azaz
- Active regions: Aleppo Governorate
- Ideology: Sunni Islamism; Secularism (formerly)
- Size: 1,100–2,000 (2012); 200 (2014); 500 (January 2015)
- Part of: (Syrian opposition) Free Syrian Army; Islamic Front; Al-Tawhid Brigade (formerly); Levant Front (since 2014); Syrian National Army (since 2017)
- Wars: the Syrian Civil War

The Northern Storm Brigade (Arabic: لواء عاصفة الشمال, Liwā’ ’Āṣifat ash-Shamāl), also known as the Northern Hurricane Brigade, was a Syrian rebel group formed in 2011 and based in Azaz in northwestern Syria, near the border with Turkey. The leader and other members of the group were smugglers from Azaz and its surroundings before the Syrian Civil War. The group retained exclusive control of the Bab al-Salam border crossing.

== History ==
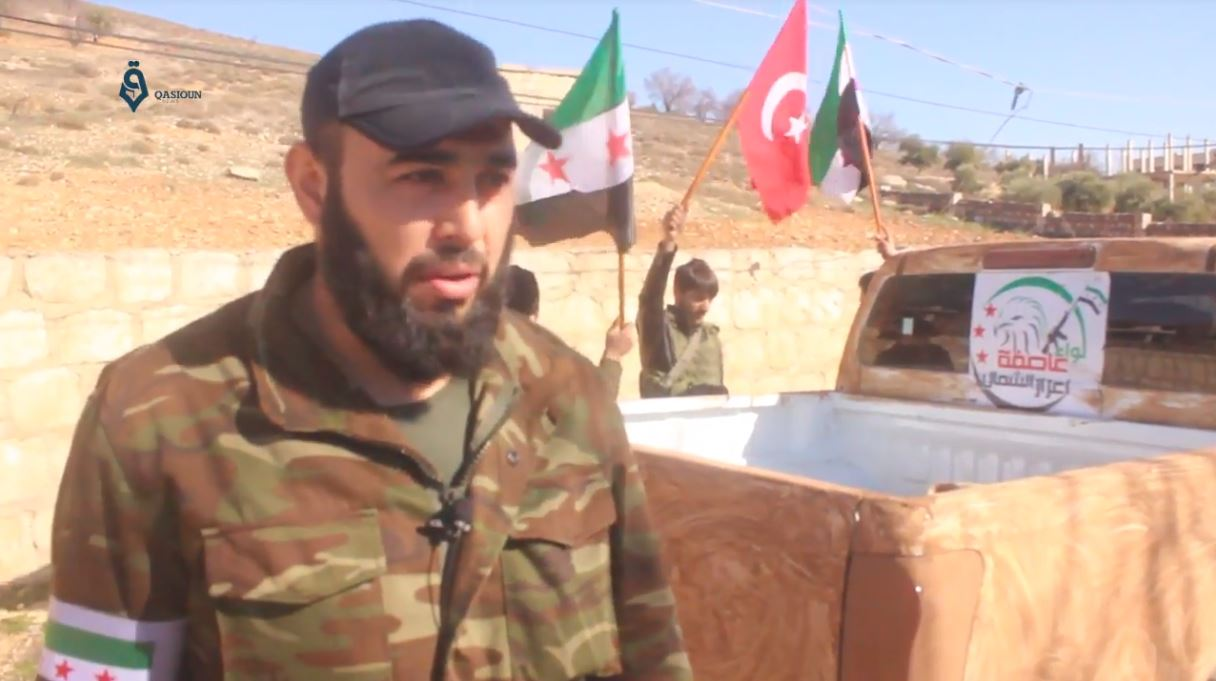
Fighters of the Northern Storm Brigade during the Turkish military operation in Afrin, February 2018

Founded in 2011, the Northern Storm Brigade took part in the rebel conquest of Azaz and the Siege of Menagh Air Base. It accepted the Supreme Military Council's authority in late 2012. The group's former leader Ammar Ibrahim Dadikhi was severely wounded in the middle of January 2013, during the siege of Menagh Air Base, which resulted in him losing one of his legs and eventually his life. He was succeeded by the group's former political leader, Samir Amouri. Two senior commanders (Hadi Salo and Samir Akkash) were also killed in this period, while other members of the group defected to Islamic rebel formations.

US Senator John McCain met with fighters from the group on May 27, 2013.

Tensions rose between the group and the Islamic State of Iraq and the Levant (ISIL) in mid-September 2013, after a dispute over a German doctor working in Azaz, ISIL claimed the doctor was a spy and was photographing ISIL's headquarters in Azaz, ISIL also claimed the Northern Storm Brigade was assisting the German doctor in his espionage activities and helped him escape from ISIL killing two ISIL members in the process. The hospital in Azaz released a statement denying the doctor was a spy, and that he was actually photographing sick patients being treated in the hospital. The hospital's statement also claimed that ISIL gunmen went into the hospital demanding the hospital's staff hand him over. Following this incident ISIL fought the Northern Storm Brigade and other groups in the area eventually taking over the city of Azaz. Following the clashes the Tawhid Brigade mediated a cease-fire between ISIL and the Northern Storm Brigade, where ISIL agreed to withdraw from the Northern Storm Brigade's headquarters and both sides were to release prisoners.

The Northern Storm Brigade claimed ISIL had not held up its end of the agreement, along with another local group known as Ahrar Azaz. The next day ISIL claimed that the Northern Storm Brigade helped Pro-Assad forces escape from the Menagh airbase and that the group was collaborating with Blackwater and the CIA, ISIL also referenced the group's meeting with John McCain as evidence. Later ISIL issued a statement demanding that the Northern Storm Brigade turn in their arms and join ISIL, as repentance in the Azaz region, otherwise ISIL liquidate the group. By 2 October 2013 ISIL declared the deadline was over and began attacking the Northern Storm Brigade, ISIL claimed that after the fighting Northern Storm Brigade members fled to Kurdish held areas.

After the fighting the Aleppo Sharia Committee, which the Tawhid Brigades was affiliated with that attempted to mediate a cease-fire between ISIL and the Northern Storm Brigade, declared the Northern Storm Brigade was a criminal group and was not allowed to carry arms.

Samir Amouri reportedly fled to Turkey and was replaced by the current leader, Mahmoud Naddom. Under his rule, the group began to develop relationships and begin coordinating with other rebels. During this period they were based in the Turkish city of Kilis.

On 2 March 2014 the Northern Storm Brigade announced that they would join the Islamic Front under the leadership of the al-Tawhid Brigade.

== Military capabilities ==
As of early 2015 Northern Storm had around 500 fighters, including several Kurds. The group's headquarters were located at a military base to the north of Azaz near the border with Turkey. It lacked heavy weaponry and vehicles, which had led to criticism of the group's abilities as a fighting force.

== Criminal activities ==
The Northern Storm Brigade has been accused of kidnapping and smuggling, and was responsible for the kidnapping of eleven Lebanese men in 2012. Nine of them were released on 19 October 2013.

== See also ==
- List of armed groups in the Syrian Civil War
