= Third Legion (Syria) =

- Leaders: Abdul Salam Hamidi; Abu Ahmed Nour(October 2021-August 2022); Abu Yassin (August 2022-January 2025)
- Dates active: 18 October 2021–29 January 2025
- Country: Syria
- Groups: Levant Front; Jaysh al-Islam; 51st Division; Peace Brigades; Elite Brigade (joined in August 2022); Sultan Malek Shah (left in July 2022); Glory Corps (left in June 2024)
- Headquarters: Afrin (formerly)
- Part of: Syrian National Army

The Third Legion was a faction of the Syrian National Army.

== History ==
The Third Legion fought with members of the Ahrar al-Sham Eastern Sector, also known as the 32nd Division, which had formerly been part of the Third Legion, but defected to Ahrar al-Sham in June 2022. The fighting killed at least five fighters on both sides, with more being wounded, in addition to killing two civilians and injuring two more. Ahrar al-Sham reinforcements from Idlib were blocked from arriving by members of the National Front for Liberation, which closed a border crossing. The Third Legion took control of Tall Battal.

The group clashed with the Hamza Division and other factions following the murder of Aleppo-based activist Muhammad Abdul Latif and his pregnant wife by the Hamza Division in October 2022, expelling the Hamza Division from al-Bab. Hay'at Tahrir al-Sham intervened on the side of the Hamza Division on 11 October. Turkey deployed its armed forces to the area on 18 October. Hayat Thaeroon for Liberation stopped the infighting by separating HTS and the Third Legion fighters.
