= Syrian Front for Liberation =

Syrian opposition group

- Arabic: الجبهة السورية للتحرير, romanized: Jabhat al-Suriya lil-Tahrir
- Leaders: Mutasim Abbas (commander-in-chief); See leaders section
- Dates active: 9 September 2021–23 January 2022
- Merger of: Hamza Division; Mu'tasim Division; Special Forces Division (from 28 September 2021); 20th Division (until 14 October 2021); Northern Falcons Brigade (until 14 October 2021); Sultan Suleiman Shah Division (al-Amshat, until 2 November 2021)
- Split from: Azm Operations Room
- Country: Syria
- Allegiance: Syrian Interim Government
- Headquarters: Al-Bab
- Active regions: Turkish-occupied northern Syria
- Status: Active
- Size: 15,000–20,000
- Part of: Syrian National Army; Free Syrian Army
- Website: https://twitter.com/SyrianFront1

The Syrian Front for Liberation (Arabic: الجبهة السورية للتحرير, romanized: Jabhat al-Suriya lil-Tahrir) was a Syrian opposition faction operating within the Turkish-backed Syrian National Army, formed by the Mu'tasim Division, the Hamza Division, the Sultan Suleiman Shah Division (al-Amshat), the 20th Division, and the Northern Hawks Brigade on 9 September 2021. The front soon began to fracture after its formation, with the Northern Hawks Brigade and 20th Division having withdrawn by 14 October and the Sultan Suleiman Shah Division by 2 November.

== Background and establishment ==
The Azm Operations Room was formed in the areas of Azaz and Afrin under auspice of Turkey's National Intelligence Organization (MİT) in mid-July 2021 by the Levant Front and the Sultan Murad Division, with the Hamza Division, Sultan Malik Shah Division, Ahrar al-Sharqiya Division, Jaysh al-Sharqiya, and Jaysh al-Islam later joining. The Levant Front blocked the Sultan Suleiman Shah Division (al-Amshat) from joining the operations room, although it later also joined.

By 23 August 2021, the Hamza Division, al-Amshat, and Northern Hawks Brigade had withdrawn from the Azm Operations Room, which led to the Levant Front surrounding the camps of Hamza and al-Amshat in Hawar Kilis and threatening to attack the three groups if they do not rejoin the operations room.

The Syrian Front for Liberation was then formed, also under orders from the MİT, as a counter to the Azm Operations Room. The founding ceremony of the SFL took place on 9 September in the center of al-Bab. Muhammad al-Jassim (Abu Amsha), leader of al-Amshat, refused to attend the ceremony, and instead sent his brother, prompting the leadership of the SFL to threaten to expel him.

While the leadership of the front emphasizes the complete integration of the five groups under a unified leadership, Firas Faham, an Istanbul-based researcher, said they're still separate. A freelance journalist based in the region also said that "These formations are only for show and they are not united in reality. Each faction still has its own leaders and members who do not take orders from the leaders of other factions. These formations only aim to protect themselves. Whenever factions feel threatened, they form new military bodies to protect themselves, but once the threat is gone, the formations fall apart."

== Leadership and organization ==
=== Leaders ===
During the founding ceremony of the Syrian Front for Liberation on 9 September 2021, Mutasim Abbas, leader of the Mutasim Division, was appointed the commander-in-chief of the Front, and Hamza Division leader Sayf Bulad as the deputy commander. Mutasim Division political leader Mustafa Sejari became the leader of the Front's political office.

On 4 October 2021, the group announced the appointment of Mahmoud al-Boushi as its overall commander in the regions of north-central and northeastern Syria captured during the 2019 offensive, with Khalil Khayriyah as his deputy. In addition, Colonel Ibrahim Daas al-Harbi was appointed the commander of the eastern sector of the region, Major Muhammad Riad Noura as commander of the Ras al-Ayn sector, and Nour Tlass as commander of the Tell Abyad sector.

=== Composition ===
In addition to its five founding member groups, the Special Forces Division led by Abdullah Halawa joined the Front on 28 September 2021. The Division was formed during the northwestern Syria offensive (December 2019–March 2020) and consists of 1,550 fighters spread across the Idlib and Aleppo governorates, Tell Abyad, and Ras al-Ayn, with its largest force concentrated in Idlib with 800 fighters. Halawa was previously a military commander of the Hamza Division before he broke away to form the Special Forces Division.

An anonymous source reported to Orient News that the 20th Division demanded to assume control over the Front's political office. When the Front's leadership refused the demand, the 20th Division led by Abu Barzan withdrew from the Front. The Northern Hawks Brigade also withdrew, citing the delay in the arrival of salaries for its members.

On 14 October 2021, the 20th Division joined the Azm Operations Room. The Azm Operations Room demanded the Northern Hawks Brigade, which also left the Syrian Front for Liberation, to hand over persons involved in the torture of a prisoner by the latter, to which the Northern Hawks Brigade complied and rejoined the Azm Operations Room.

On 2 November 2021, the Sultan Suleiman Shah Division left the Syrian Front for Liberation to join the Revolutionaries Movement, part of the Azm Operations Room. The withdrawal of the three factions from the Front was reportedly due to the Front being dominated by the Hamza and Mutasim divisions, who are rivals of the Levant Front and the Sultan Murad Division, two dominant groups in the Azm Operations Room.

== History ==
On 1 November 2021, Syrian Front for Liberation political leader Mustafa al-Sejari announced the group's readiness to participate in a new Turkish-led offensive against the Syrian Democratic Forces to occupy the Autonomous Administration of North and East Syria.

It was reported later in November than the Hamza and Mutasim divisions were in negotiations with the Azm Operations Room to join the Third Corps under the operations room. The operations room also claimed that Abdullah Halawa, commander of the Special Forces Division, fled to Turkey after being charged with smuggling and drug trafficking.

On 13 November 2021, the Syrian Front for Liberation praised Qatar's rejection of normalizing relations with the Syrian government.

== See also ==
- National Front for Liberation
