= Ebdo Mihemed =

Wedding singer

Ebdo Mihemed عەبدۆ محەممەد
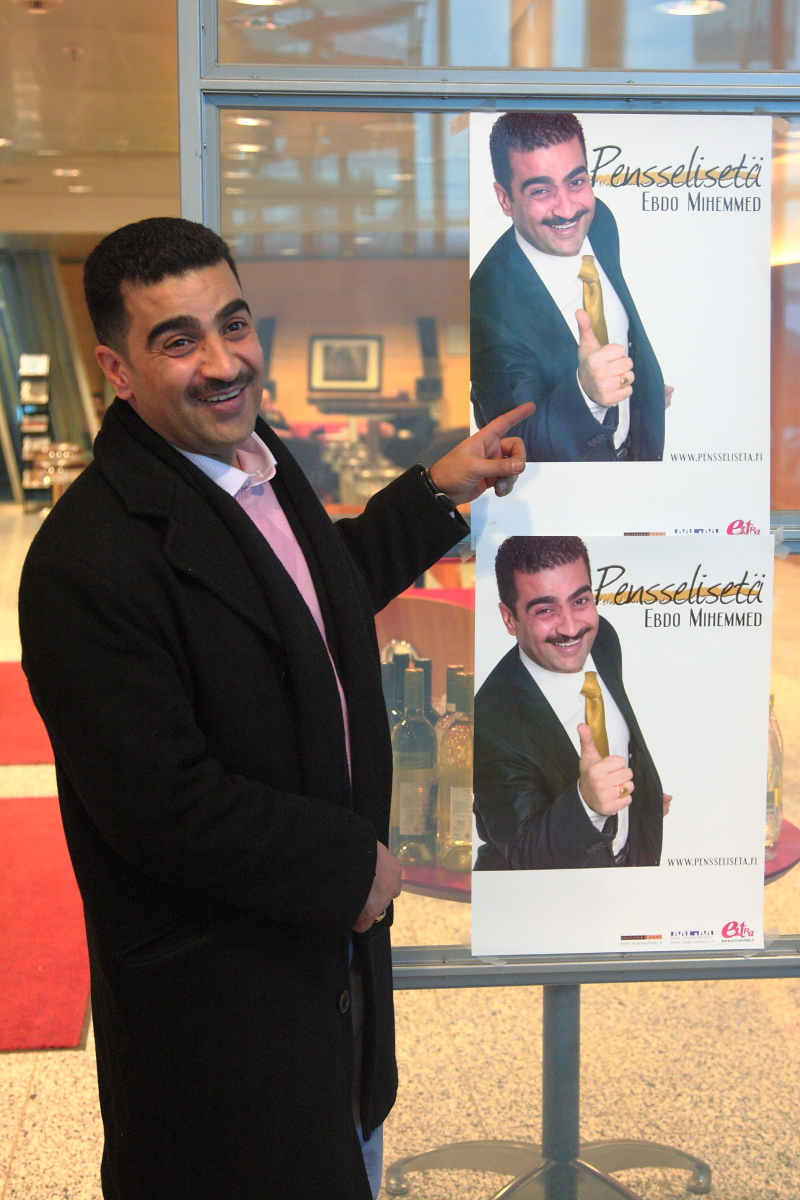
- Mihemed at Helsinki-Vantaa Airport, 2010

Background information
- Also known as: Abdo Mohamad; Pensseli-setä
- Born: Efrin, Syria
- Genres: Kurdish music; wedding songs
- Occupation: Singer
- Instrument: Vocals
- Works: Pensseli-setä (2009)
- Years active: 2009–present

Ebdo Mihemed (Kurmanji Kurdish: عەبدۆ محەممەد) or Abdo Mohamad (Arabic: عبدو محمد) is a Syrian Kurdish wedding singer from Efrin. He became popular in Finland in the autumn of 2009 due to a YouTube video which attracted over two million viewers, and reached at over four million views as of November 2018.

On the video, the Kurdish language song "Pinsedî Zêde" ("Over Five Hundred") sung by Mihemed is buffalaxed into Finnish, with the soramimi being called "Niilin hanhet" ("The Geese of the Nile") after a phrase repeated in the refrain. Another phrase repeated in the soramimi is Pensseli-setä ("Uncle Paintbrush"), which also became Mihemed's nickname in Finland. Several other videos of Mihemed buffalaxed into Finnish have also appeared on YouTube, such as "Mursuvaara" ("The Walrus Danger"), "Lakana" ("The Sheet") and "Mihemmedin Eskimolaulu" ("Mihemmed's Eskimo Song").

The television production company Filmiteollisuus brought Mihemed to perform in Finland in November 2009. He appeared on the show Ne Salmiset. On December 9, 2009, his music album Pensseli-setä was released in Finland. He toured Finland a second time in February 2010, where he has since not appeared. In 2011 and 2012, he was the local contact for the Finnish media for reporting events in the Syrian civil war.

== Face of the Syrian civil war in Finland ==
A national uprising started in Syria in early 2011, as a part of the events in the Arab spring. Reporter Ville Similä from Helsingin Sanomat asked in June 2011 what had happened to Mihemed in the midst of the situation which had escalated into war. Mihemed reported from Aleppo that "it is still quite peaceful here" and "most people try to live like before. In the evening people go out to smoke shishas." He also reported that people are afraid to go out at night, and the streets are full of police and soldiers. Mihemed told the reporters that he had continued working as a wedding singer despite the conflict, mostly in weddings in villages near Aleppo.

The tabloid newspaper Iltalehti asked Mihemed's friend, Al Hanan Saydo, about Mihemed in May 2012. According to Saydo, Mihemed had very little work because very few weddings are being held in the time of the civil war. Saydo also reported that considering the circumstances, Mihemed is well.

As the battles continued to Aleppo in summer 2012, Mihemed escaped from the war together with his wife and two youngest children first to Turkey, attempting to get a visa to go to Finland. When this failed, the family travelled illegally to Greece, and in spring 2013 continued to Sweden where Mihemed's wife's relatives live.

== See also ==
- Internet phenomenon
