= Jaysh al-Sharqiya (2017) =

Syrian rebel group formed in 2017

- جيش الشرقية
- Logo of Jaysh al-Sharqiya
- Military leader: Hussein Hamadi
- Dates active: 23 November 2017 - Unknown
- Country: Syria
- Active regions: Aleppo Governorate
- Ideology: Sunni Islamism
- Size: ~1,000 militants
- Part of: (Syrian opposition) Free Syrian Army (Syrian opposition) Syrian National Army: (Syrian opposition) Liberation and Construction Movement
- Wars: Syrian Civil War

Jaysh al-Sharqiya (Arabic: جيش الشرقية, lit. 'Army of the East') was a rebel group that was formed in 2017 during the Syrian Civil War. The group was active in the Aleppo Governorate.

== History ==
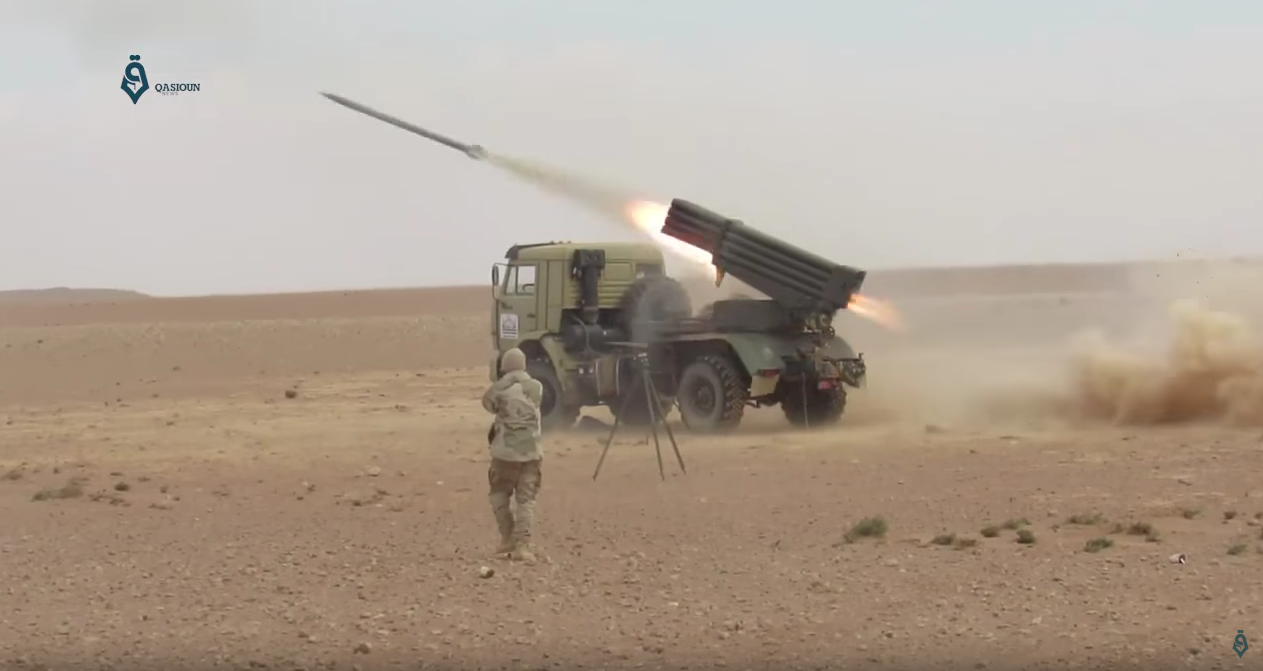
A rocket being fired from a BM-21 Grad owned by the group

Jaysh al-Sharqiya announced its formation through a press release on 23 November 2017. It was made up of fighters from eastern Syria, from the governorates of Deir ez-Zor, Al-Hasakah and Raqqa, but was expelled from these territories by the Islamic State in 2014. Its commander was Hussein Hamadi. Shortly after the group's formation, it declared having 1,000 men under its command, from fifteen separate factions. Some fighters came from Ahrar al-Sharqiya, Ahrar al-Sham and the Authenticity and Development Front.

Supported by Turkey, which notably supplied it with armored personnel carriers, Jaysh al-Sharqiya was integrated into the Syrian National Army and participated in the Battle of Afrin in early 2018, where it fought on the Jindires front to the south. After the battle, the group remained based in this region. Like many other rebel groups in Afrin, Jaysh al-Sharqiya was accused of several kidnappings and attacks against the Kurds in the region.

== See also ==
- List of armed groups in the Syrian Civil War
