= Mohammed al-Jassem =

Syrian Army General

- Native name: محمد الجاسم
- Born: 1987 (age 38–39); Jousa, Hama, Syria
- Allegiance: Syrian opposition (2011–2024); Syrian National Army (until 2025); Syria (since 2025)
- Rank: Brigadier General
- Commands: Sultan Suleiman Shah Division (SNA); 62nd Division (Syrian Army)
- Conflicts: Syrian Civil War; Al-Nusra Front–SRF/Hazzm Movement conflict; Operation Olive Branch; East Aleppo offensive (2024–2025)

Mohammed al-Jassem (Arabic: محمد الجاسم, born in 1987, Jousa, Hama Governorate), also known by his nom de guerre Abu Amsha (Arabic: أبو عمشة) is a Syrian Army general commanding the 62nd Division. He had previously served as the leader of the Sultan Suleiman Shah Division, a faction within the Turkish-supported group known as the Syrian National Army.

Abu Amsha gained prominence during the Syrian civil war after joining several opposition military groups. He also became well known in March 2025, after participating in the 2025 massacres of Syrian Alawites, in which he participated as the commander of the Hama division within the newly re-formed Syrian Army under the command of Murhaf Abu Qasra.

== Military career ==
Before the outbreak of the Syrian civil war, al-Jassem worked as a tractor and harvester driver in the Syrian countryside. With the onset of the conflict in 2011, he joined an armed opposition group known as "Khat Al-Nar" (Fire Line), which later merged with the "Martyrs of Hiyalin Battalion". On 19 November 2012, he co-founded the "Fire Line Brigade" in northern Hama Governorate.

He joined the Syrian Revolutionaries Front (SRF) in 2013. Following clashes between it and Jabhat al-Nusra, (which resulted in the dissolution of the SRF), al-Jassem relocated to northern Aleppo Governorate and joined the Levant Front. Later, he became a unit commander in the Sultan Murad Division during Operation Olive Branch in Afrin in 2018 where his unit allegadly became infamous for committing atrocities against the local Kurds. Afterward, he established the Sultan Suleiman Shah Division, which became part of the Turkish-backed Syrian National Army.

After the fall of the Assad regime, military opposition factions began to merge within the Syrian Army under the Ministry of Defense of the new administration. Al-Jassem was subsequently promoted to the rank of brigadier general and was appointed commander of the 25th Division, with Enab Baladi calling it the Hama Brigade. Although later reports stated he led the 62nd Division.

== Controversies and allegations ==
Al-Jassem has frequently been criticized for his public appearances with armored vehicles and armed escorts. He has been accused of various human rights violations, including looting, extortion, and abuses against local populations in areas under his control. On 16 February 2022, he was removed from his leadership position by a tribunal of Syrian opposition factions investigating these allegations. Nonetheless, no action had been taken against him by April 2022 and he remained in a leadership position.

Al-Jassem has also been accused of involvement in economic activities, including managing car dealerships under his faction's control. In August 2023, the United States Department of the Treasury sanctioned him and his faction, stating that they engaged in extortion, forced displacement, and property confiscation, particularly targeting Kurdish residents of Afrin. On 28 May 2025, the Council of the European Union sanctioned him and his faction for his involvement in the 2025 massacres of Syrian Alawites. On 19 December 2025, he was sanctioned by the United Kingdom for his involvement in the March 2025 clashes and "historic violence committed during the Syrian Civil War".

Al-Jassem had also been accused of smuggling fighters and mercenaries from Syria to other countries.

In a subsequent interview with Al Majalla, he denied any violations by his unit and claimed he was being treated at a hospital in southern Turkey during the Assadist insurgency.

== See also ==
- War crimes in the Syrian civil war
- Turkish involvement in the Syrian civil war
