= 76th Division (Syria) =

- Active: 2025 – present
- Country: Syria
- Branch: Syrian Army
- Type: Division
- Size: ~10,000
- Area of responsibility: Aleppo Governorate
- Engagements: Western Syria clashes; March 2025 Western Syria clashes; 2025 massacres of Syrian Alawites

Commanders
- Current commander: Brigadier General Sayf Bulad

The 76th Division is a unit of the Syrian Army. The division's formation was announced in March 2025, shortly after creation of the 80th Division. During the same month the division reportedly took part in the 2025 massacres of Syrian Alawites, for which they were sanctioned by the Council of the European Union.

By June 2025, the Syrian Army had begun integrating members from various factions, including the SNA. On 1 July 2025, the Aleppo Military Academy hosted a graduation ceremony for 3,000 new recruits for the 76th Division, which was attended by Defense Minister Murhaf Abu Qasra. The event featured a military parade showcasing skills in infantry, armored, aerial combat, and airborne operations. The division has been involved in security operations in the Aleppo region, though its nominal integration under the Ministry of Defense has been challenged by the independence of SNA factions due to financial constraints from international sanctions.

On 6 October 2025, two members of the 76th Division opened fire on a young man in the Al-Ashrafiyah neighborhood of Afrin, wounding him; he died from his injuries on 9 October.
