= Ahrar al-Sham Eastern Sector =

Ahrar al-Sham Eastern Sector 32nd Division
- Leaders: Abu Haidara; Abu al-Dahdah
- Dates active: 2011-June 2024
- Headquarters: Ablah, Syria; Olan, Syria
- Part of: Ahrar al-Sham (2011-2017, 2022-2024) (Syrian opposition) Syrian National Army: Hayat Thaeroon for Liberation (May 2022-February 2023); Levant Front (2017-2022, from April 2024); Al-Shahba Gathering (February 2023-April 2024)
- Wars: the Syrian Civil War

Ahrar al-Sham Eastern Sector, also known as the 32nd Division, was an ally of Hay'at Tahrir al-Sham (HTS) that was active during the Syrian civil war.

== History ==
The group originally was part of Ahrar al-Sham, under the name 32nd Division. Members under the leadership of Abu Haidara later relocated to northern Aleppo and became part of the Levant Front in November 2017.

It left the Third Legion in April 2022, following attacks on it by the Levant Front. The 32nd Division returned to Ahrar al-Sham and rebranded as the Ahrar al-Sham Eastern Sector.

The following month, the group reportedly became part of Hayat Thaeroon for Liberation, though the merger was unsuccessful.

Ahrar al-Sham Eastern Sector fought with the Third Legion, as well as the Levant Front and Jaysh al-Islam, in June 2022.

Abu Haidar Maskana aligned himself with the Second Legion of the Syrian National Army, while the faction headed by Abu al-Dahdah al-Manbij aligned with Hay'at Tahrir al-Sham. Abu Haidar was isolated as a result and the leadership of HTS and Ahrar al-Sham appointed al-Dahdah as "section commander."
