= Levant Front =

Syrian rebel group formed in 2014

- الجبهة الشامية; Jabhat al-Shamiyah
- Logo Frequently used flag
- Leaders: Abu Amr (emir); Colonel Muhammad al-Ahmad (spokesman); Muhammad Abu Ibrahim (military commander); Abu Ahmad al-Jazrawi
- Dates active: 25 December 2014 – 18 April 2015; 18 June 2015 – 29 January 2025
- Headquarters: Azaz, Aleppo Governorate, Syria
- Active regions: Aleppo Governorate, Syria
- Ideology: Sunni Islamism; Jihadism (until 2016)
- Size: 2,500 (2015); 8,000 (December 2016, Russian military claim)
- Part of: (Syrian opposition) Free Syrian Army (Syrian opposition) Syrian National Army: Third Legion; Fatah Halab (until 2016); Jaysh Halab (until 2016); Mare' Operations Room (until 2016); Hawar Kilis Operations Room
- Wars: the Syrian Civil War

The Levant Front (Arabic: الجبهة الشامية, romanized: al-Jabhat aš-Šāmiyya, Jabhat al-Shamiyah, also translated as the Sham Front or the Levantine Front) was a Syrian revolutionary group based around Aleppo involved in the Syrian Civil War. It was formed in December 2014.

The northern branch of the Levant Front is part of the Turkish-backed Syrian National Army. The Netherlands' public prosecutor declared it to be a terrorist organisation in 2018, despite the Dutch government having earlier provided it with support.

At the Syrian Revolution Victory Conference, which was held on 29 January 2025, most factions of the armed opposition, including the Levant Front, announced their dissolution and were incorporated into the newly formed Ministry of Defense.

== Ideology ==
The Levant Front's membership includes the major Sunni Islamist groups operating in northern Syria, representing a spectrum of ideologies from hardline Islamism to apolitical factions linked to the Free Syrian Army. The group imposes Sharia law where murder and apostasy in Islam are punishable by death. In Aleppo, media activists accusing the Levant Front of corruption and otherwise criticizing the group have received threats and faced reprisal attacks. Courts affiliated with the group have also been accused of summary killings by Amnesty International.

== History ==
=== Initial formation ===
Following months of negotiations in Turkey and northern Syria between the Islamic Front (mainly the al-Tawhid Brigade), the Army of Mujahideen, the Nour al-Din al-Zenki Movement, the Fastaqim Union, and the Authenticity and Development Front, on 25 December 2014, the factions announced that they combined their forces into a joint command called the Levant Front. The US-backed Hazzm Movement joined the coalition on 30 January 2015, and announced its dissolution and merger into other Levant Front factions on 1 March 2015.

On 20 February 2015, the Levant Front successfully forced Syrian Army forces to retreat from rural towns in Aleppo; during the clashes group claimed to have killed 300 Syrian soldiers and captured 110. During the same month, the group signed an agreement with the YPG and installed Sharia courts in Sheikh Maqsood and Afrin.

=== 2015: Dissolution and reestablishment ===
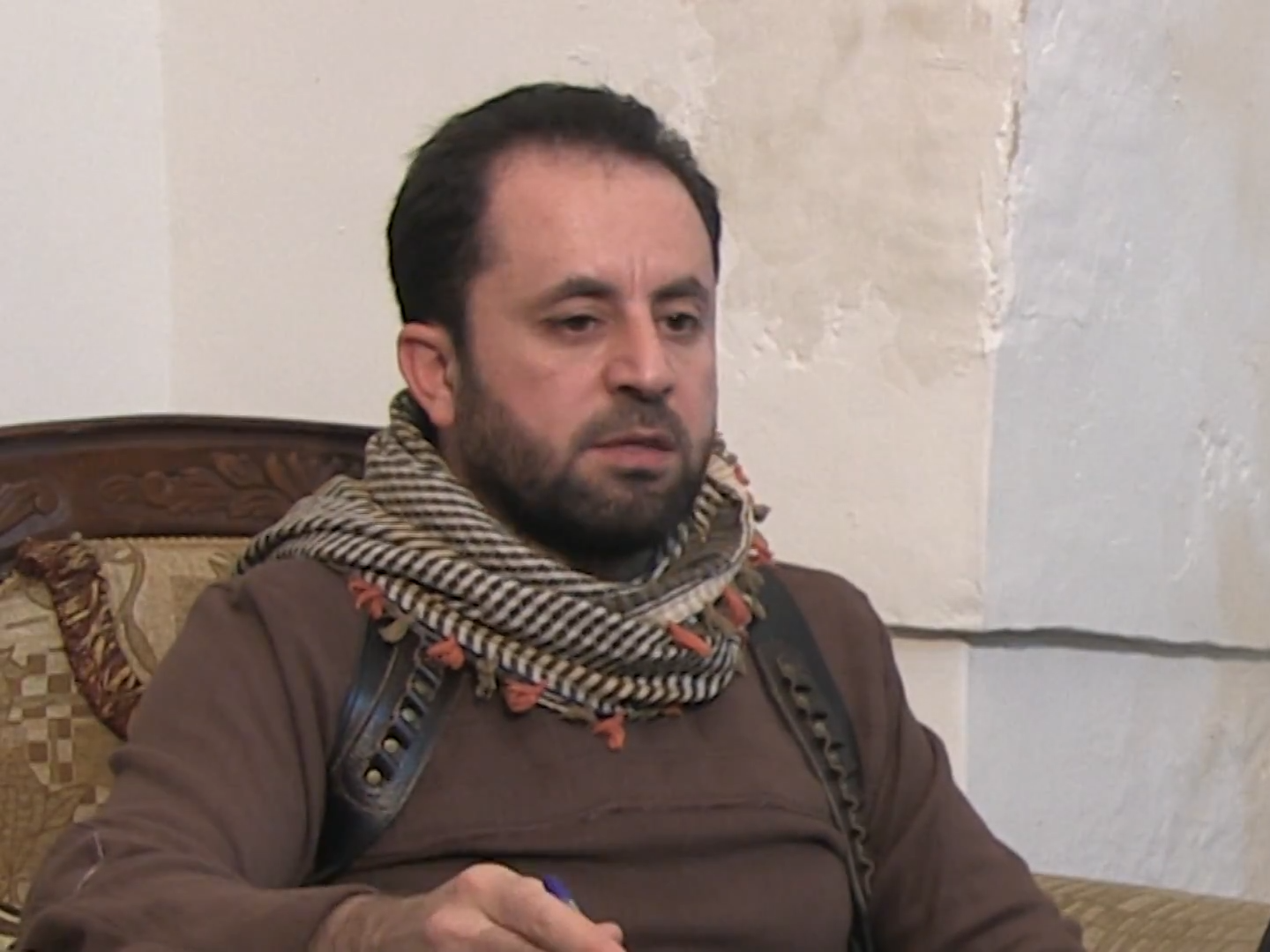
Mudar al-Najjar, chief of staff of the Levant Front until his resignation on 11 October 2015.

On 18 April 2015, the Levant Front announced its dissolution as an alliance, however it stated that the member factions would continue to coordinate with each other militarily. Reasons behind the split were believed to include a lack of coordination between the groups and increasing defections of its members to other factions.

Between May and June 2015, the Trotskyist Leon Sedov Brigade joined the Levant Front. In June 2016, it largely separated from the group, before completely leaving in October 2016.

The group announced its reactivation on 18 June. Its new leader is Abu Amr, who was an Ahrar al-Sham commander. On 29 June, the Levant Front released their charter.

Since its reactivation on 18 June, the Levant Front operates as a unified group with former members acting as independent groups. Various groups have joined and left the group since its reactivation, such as Abu Amara Battalions and the Levant Revolutionaries Battalions.

=== SDF offensive against the Levant Front ===
On 16 November 2015, the Syrian Democratic Forces announced the formation of its branch in the Aleppo and Idlib governorates. The YPG, YPJ, and the Army of Revolutionaries were the founding members of the coalition. Subsequently, clashes erupted between the SDF and the Levant Front, comprising Ahrar al-Sham, the al-Nusra Front, and the Mare' Operations Room.

On 10 February 2016, the SDF successfully drove out the Levant Front from the Menagh Military Airbase. After days of fierce clashes, the YPG and the Army of Revolutionaries captured a series of villages before reaching and capturing the airbase and the town of Menagh from the Levant Front. According to sources quoted by Reuters, the SDF were supported by Russian airstrikes. The SDF initiated this offensive following the recent Syrian Army offensive on rebel forces in Aleppo supported by Russian airstrikes. The SDF advanced from the Afrin Canton, the westernmost part of Rojava, which had been attacked multiple times by Islamist groups such as the al-Nusra Front. The aim was to prevent attacks on Afrin canton and close the Turkish border to these various Islamist groups.

=== Turkish intervention and rebel infighting ===
On 24 August 2016, Turkey launched a large-scale military campaign in the northern Aleppo Governorate against both ISIL and the SDF. The Levant Front's northern branch was one of the Syrian National Army factions (SNA) that participated in the operation, which captured Jarabulus, al-Bab, and dozens of other towns in northern Aleppo.

On 24 January 2017, the al-Nusra Front backed by Nour al-Din al-Zenki attacked the Army of Mujahideen and the Levant Front west of Aleppo, defeating both. The former two groups then merged with several other Islamist factions and declared the formation of Tahrir al-Sham. The Levant Front's western Aleppo branch and several other former Levant Front groups, such as the Army of Mujahideen and the Fastaqim Union, joined Ahrar al-Sham.

In July 2017, the Levant Front's northern branch attacked its former ally and co-SNA group, the Descendants of Saladin Brigade, kidnapping its leader and raiding its bases with other SNA units. This followed the Descendants of Saladin Brigade's declaration that it would not take part in a planned Turkish-led offensive against Afrin Canton, which is ruled by the secular, Kurdish-dominated PYD. The Levant Front reportedly justified this operation by claiming that the Descendants of Saladin Brigade's leader Mahmoud Khallo was an al-Qaeda member and allied to the PYD; according to Khallo, the Levant Front tortured him until he was handed over to the Turkish security forces.

=== June 2022 clashes with Ahrar ash-Sham and HTS ===
In June 2022, the Levant Front clashed with Ahrar ash-Sham and HTS forces. In this conflict, the Levant Front was backed by the Turkish-aligned groups Sham Legion and Jaysh al-Islam.

=== October 2022 clashes with Hamza Division and HTS ===
In October 2022, the Levant Front fought with the Hamza Division, with HTS forces aligning with the Hamza Division.

=== Severing of relations with the Turkish-backed Syrian Interim Government ===
In September 2024, the Levant Front ceased relations with the Turkish-backed Syrian Interim Government and called for the governments dissolution as well as the arrest of SIG prime minister Abdul Rahman Mustafa. This announcement had come after a meeting between Mustafa and a Levant Front delegation arranged by Turkish intelligence, in which Mustafa accused the Levant Front of "terrorism" through some factions in the group such as Ahrar al-Sharqiya.

== Foreign support ==
The government of the Netherlands provided materials to the Levant Front as part of a program of non-lethal assistance for 22 rebel groups in Syria from 2015 to 2018. In September 2018, the Dutch public prosecution department declared the Levant Front to be a "criminal organisation of terrorist intent", describing it as a "salafist and jihadistic" group that "strives for the setting up of the caliphate".

In an interview an official from the group stated that the Levant Front takes ISIL members and their families captive and will sell them to foreign governments and intelligence agencies for revenue, among the nations listed included the United States and United Arab Emirates, rewards for captured ISIL members are over 10 million USD and the transactions are arranged by brokers and Turkish officials.

== Composition ==
- Northern Storm Brigade (NSB)
- Ahrar Mennagh
- Emergency Force
- Fasa’il Mari‘a
- Northern Knights Brigade
- Soldiers of Islam Brigade
- Soldiers of Levant Brigade
- Conquest Brigade (left in December 2022, as part of Ahrar al-Tawhid, rejoined separately by May 2023)
- Ahrar al-Tawhid (component groups left to form the faction in December 2022, before rejoining as one in April 2024)
  - Conquest Brigade (left formation by May 2023)
  - Force 55
  - Jazeera Revolutionaries
  - Sultan Othman Brigade
  - Free 322nd Brigade
  - First Central
  - 5th Battalion
  - Azaz Falcons Brigade (left NSB in May 2023)
  - Martyr Ibrahim Radwan Battalion (left NSB in May 2023)
  - Masaab Abu az-Zuber Battalion (left NSB in May 2023)
  - Muthanna Battalion (left NSB in May 2023)
- Leon Sedov Brigade (May – June 2015)
- Al-Fauj al-Awwal (left in late 2015)
- Suqour al-Sham Brigades-Eastern Sector (left to join the Liberation and Construction Movement in February 2022)
- Kataeb Bloc (left to join the Al-Shahba Gathering in February 2023)
- Ahrar al-Sham Eastern Sector (left to fully rejoin Ahrar al-Sham in June 2022, briefly rejoined in April 2024, joined the Al-Shahba Gathering until its dissolution)
- Northern Falcons Brigade (joined on 2 October 2024, before being forced to dissolve on 10 October 2024 by the SIG)
- Sajidun Lillah Brigades (left to join the 51st Division in October 2024)
- 5th Brigade (left to join the 51st Division in October 2024)

== See also ==
- List of armed groups in the Syrian Civil War
