= Hamza Division (Aleppo) =

Syrian rebel group

- فرقة الحمزة; Furqat al-Hamza
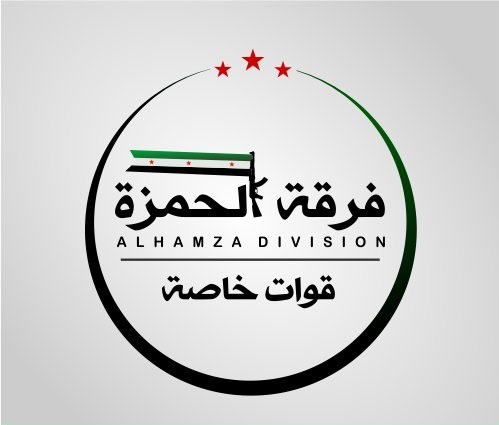
- Official logo of the Hamza Division
- Leaders: Brig. Gen. Sayf Bulad ("Sayf Abu Bakr"); Lt. Abdullah Halawa; Abu Jalal; Hasan Abdullah Kulli (Kurdish Falcons Brigade); Yasser Abu al-Sheikh †
- Dates active: 2012–2013 (as Hamza Battalion); 2013–2025 (as Hamza Division)
- Groups: Hamza Brigade; Northern Thunder Brigade; Mare' Resistance Brigade; Special Operations Brigade; Dhi Qar Brigade; Kurdish Falcons Brigade; Former: 1st Brigade; 5th Brigade; 51st Brigade; Free Syria Brigade; Samarkand Brigade (former, part of the Syrian Turkmen Brigades)
- Headquarters: Mare, Aleppo Governorate; Military college near al-Bab
- Active regions: Aleppo Governorate
- Ideology: Syrian nationalism
- Size: 900 (February 2017); 2,200+ (self-claim, September 2017); 2,200-6,500 (2018)
- Part of: (Syrian opposition) Free Syrian Army (Syrian opposition) Syrian National Army: Syrian Front for Liberation; Hawar Kilis Operations Room

The Hamza Division (Arabic: فرقة الحمزة) was a Syrian rebel group in northwestern Syria affiliated with the Syrian National Army, trained and equipped by the United States, the United Kingdom and Turkey as part of the Syrian Train and Equip Program. Formed in 2013, it cooperated with the Turkish Armed Forces in the Turkish occupation of northern Syria.

In 2018, Turkey "deployed 600 members of the Kurdish Falcon Brigade to join the Hamza Division" in "what may have been an.. [attempt] to counter accusations of anti-Kurdish discrimination". During the integration of Syrian rebel factions in 2025, the Hamza Division was reorganized into the 76th Division.

== History ==
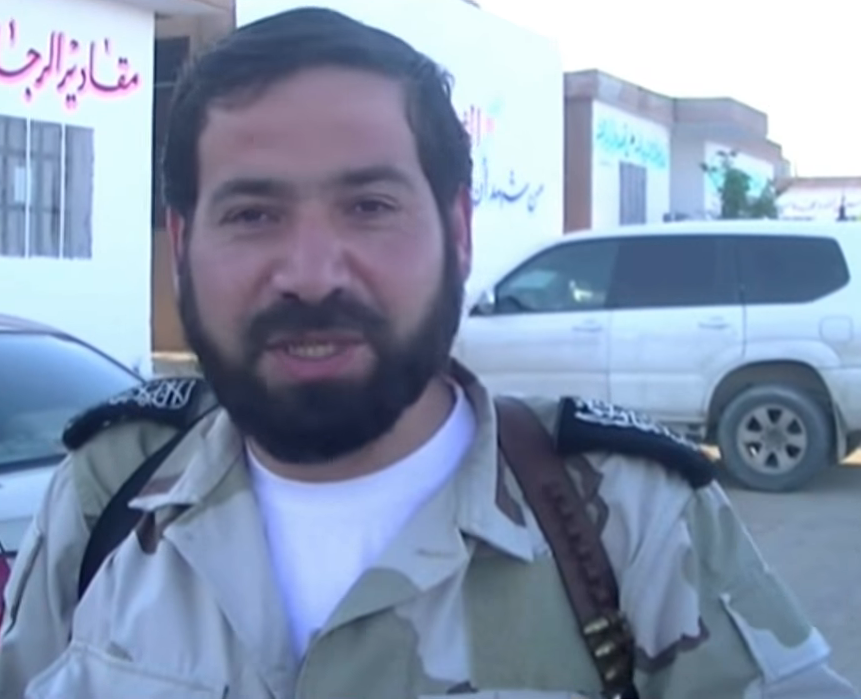
Yasser Abu al-Sheikh, commander of the Hamza Brigade until his death in April 2016

=== 2013 ===
The Hamza Division was originally formed as the Hamza Brigade of the Free Syrian Army (FSA) in the southern countryside of the Hasakah Governorate in northeast Syria in 2013.

=== 2016 ===
On 23 April 2016, five FSA groups based in the town of Mare' in the northern Aleppo Governorate countryside, the Hamza Brigade, the Dhi Qar Brigade, the Northern Thunder Brigade, the Mare Resistance Brigade, and the Special Operations Brigade merged into the Hamza Division, citing "interests of unity" and proclaiming its intention to fight the "crime and terror" of the Islamic State of Iraq and the Levant (ISIL) and the Syrian government. Under the command of Syrian Army defector Lt. Sayf Bulad ("Sayf Abu Bakr"), the factions receive military support from CJTF-OIR, the international coalition against ISIL.

In June 2016, the Northern Thunder Brigade received BGM-71 TOW missiles from CJTF-OIR. Also that month, a Syrian Turkmen group called the "Samarkand Brigade", named after the city in Uzbekistan, joined the Hamza Division.

During Operation Euphrates Shield in late August, the Hamza Division became one of the first FSA groups to enter Jarabulus from Karkamış. Sayf Bulad was among those who followed behind Turkish Land Forces tanks and troops and entered Jarabulus in the morning of the first day of the operation, reaching the city center by afternoon. He later gave a speech to residents in Jarabulus.

On 18 October 2016, the Northern Thunder Brigade, part of the Hamza Division, issued an ultimatum to the YPG and the Army of Revolutionaries, warning them to leave Tell Rifaat within 48 hours after which they would attack the town. The threat was not carried out.

=== 2017 ===
On 24 September 2017, the Hamza Division announced the opening of a military academy in the city of al-Bab. According to Abdullah Halawa, the military commander of the group, 2,200 fighters were to undergo two months of training in the academy, with the goal of forming a "Syrian National Army" in northern Syria.

=== 2018 ===
In January 2018, the group participated in Operation Olive Branch, the Turkish Armed Forces' invasion of the Afrin Region, against the YPG-led Syrian Democratic Forces. In February, the Kurdish Falcons Brigade (aka Red Berets) was formed as part of the Hamza Division. Led by Hasan Abdullah Kulli, it claimed to consist of 400 Kurds and 200 Arabs. The TAF and TFSA captured Afrin on 18 March 2018, after SDF fighters withdrew from the city.

On 25 March, Hamza Division fighters killed a commander of Ahrar al-Sharqiya in Afrin in a dispute over territory and spoils of war, resulting in clashes between the two groups. In response, Ahrar al-Sharqiya arrested around 200 Hamza Division fighters. A ceasefire agreement between the two groups was signed on the same day under Turkish supervision.

In June 2018, the Hamza Division assassinated an Ahrar al-Sham commander in al-Bab.

=== 2019 ===
The Hamza Division was among the groups which volunteered to send fighters to Libya, as part of the Turkish military intervention in the Second Libyan Civil War, in December 2019.

=== 2020 ===
In May 2020, the Syrian Observatory for Human Rights reported several deaths of Syrian fighters in Libya, including Hamza members.

On 28 May protestors in Afrin demanded the withdrawal of the Hamza Division from Afrin after several abuses carried out by the group, including holding female prisoners naked. During the protests members of Ahrar al-Sham and Jaysh al-Islam (exiled from East Ghouta), clashed with the Hamza Division at their headquarters and were eventually able to take over the headquarters, arresting several Hamza Division members in the process. Three Hamza Division members were killed in the course of the confrontation.

=== 2021 ===
On 9 September 2021, five Turkish-supported groups announced that they had merged into the Syrian Front for Liberation. They include the Sultan Suleiman Shah Division, Hamza Division, al-Mutasim Brigade, Suqour al-Sham Brigades and the 20th Division.

=== 2023 ===
On 17 August 2023, the United States imposed sanctions on the Hamza Division and its leader "in connection to serious human rights abuses committed in northern Syria, including abduction, severe physical abuse, and rape."

=== 2025 ===
The Hamza Division participated in the massacres of Alawites that took place in March 2025.

Sayf Bulad, also known as ”Saif Abu Bakr”, who was the commander of the Hamza Division, was appointed by the government to lead Syria's 76th Division. Bulad had previously committed serious human rights abuses against Kurds in Afrin.
