= Sultan Suleiman Shah Division =

Militant group

Sultan Suleiman Shah Division al-Amshat
- Leaders: Mohammed al-Jassem (nom de guerre: Abu Amsha)
- Dates active: 2011–2025
- Active regions: Turkish occupation of northern Syria
- Part of: (Syrian opposition) Free Syrian Army (until 2017) (Syrian opposition) Syrian National Army (until 2025): Dawn of Freedom Operations Room; Azm Operations Room; Syrian Front for Liberation (2021)
- Wars: Syrian civil war

The Sultan Suleiman Shah Division (Arabic: فرقة السلطان سليمان شاه, romanized: Firqat al-Sulṭān Sulaymān Shāh) was a Turkish-backed faction in Syria operating under the Syrian National Army in the Syrian civil war. The group is also known as Suleiman Shah Brigade, and Amsha or al-Amshat after its commander Mohammed al-Jassem's nom de guerre, and was known as the Fireline Brigade until 2016. The group was incorporated into the Syrian Army under the Syrian transitional government as the 62nd Division in 2025 after the fall of the Assad regime.

== During the Syrian Civil War ==
The group participated in the Turkish occupation of northern Syria and controlled the Shaykh al-Hadid subdistrict of Afrin countryside. In late 2021, Syrian opposition factions opened files and lawsuits against the Sultan Suleiman Shah Division and its leadership because of their violations in the Shaykh al-Hadid area.

On 16 February 2022, after two months of hearing witness testimony and investigating allegations against the division's leadership, the tripartite commission tasked with examining the group's atrocities decided to remove Mohammed al-Jassem and his brother from their leadership positions in the division and strip them of any position within the armed opposition, citing "qualification issues" and alleging that the witnesses were pressured into changing their testimony.

== Foreign deployments ==
=== Libya ===
The Sultan Suleiman Shah Division was one of the Syrian rebel groups that deployed fighters to participate in the Libyan Civil War on behalf of the Government of National Accord. As of September 2022, 3,000 Syrian rebel fighters were present in Libya.

=== Azerbaijan ===
The division contributed a portion of the total between 1,500 and 2,000 Syrian rebel fighters deployed to Azerbaijan in the Second Nagorno-Karabakh War, participating in the conflict from September 2020 until its conclusion. This deployment led to some controversy, with one rebel fighter in northern Syria commenting in a widely disseminated recording: "We can’t fight alongside the Shias. (...) [T]he Shias are our enemies more than the Christians and Jews". Later, in April 2021, a group from among the division's fighters who had participated in the Nagorno-Karabakh War protested in Turkish-occupied northern Syria, accusing the division's head Mohammed al-Jassem of having seized their salaries.

=== Niger ===
The division was one of the factions affiliated with the Turkey-backed Syrian National Army that deployed a combined total of at least 1,000 fighters to Niger between November 2023 and April 2024, in order to protect Turkish interests in the country, particularly mines.

== Sanctions ==
The group was sanctioned by the United States Department of the Treasury for "serious human rights abuses against those residing in the Afrin region of northern Syria" in 2023.

== Human rights abuses ==
The group and its commander has been accused of widespread human rights abuses and war crimes, including extrajudicial killings, kidnappings, torture, extortion, sexual violence, and looting.

Fighters from the Sultan Suleiman Shah Division participated in the 2025 massacres of Syrian Alawites.
