= Afrin, Syria =

City in Syria

Afrin عفرين Efrîn
- City
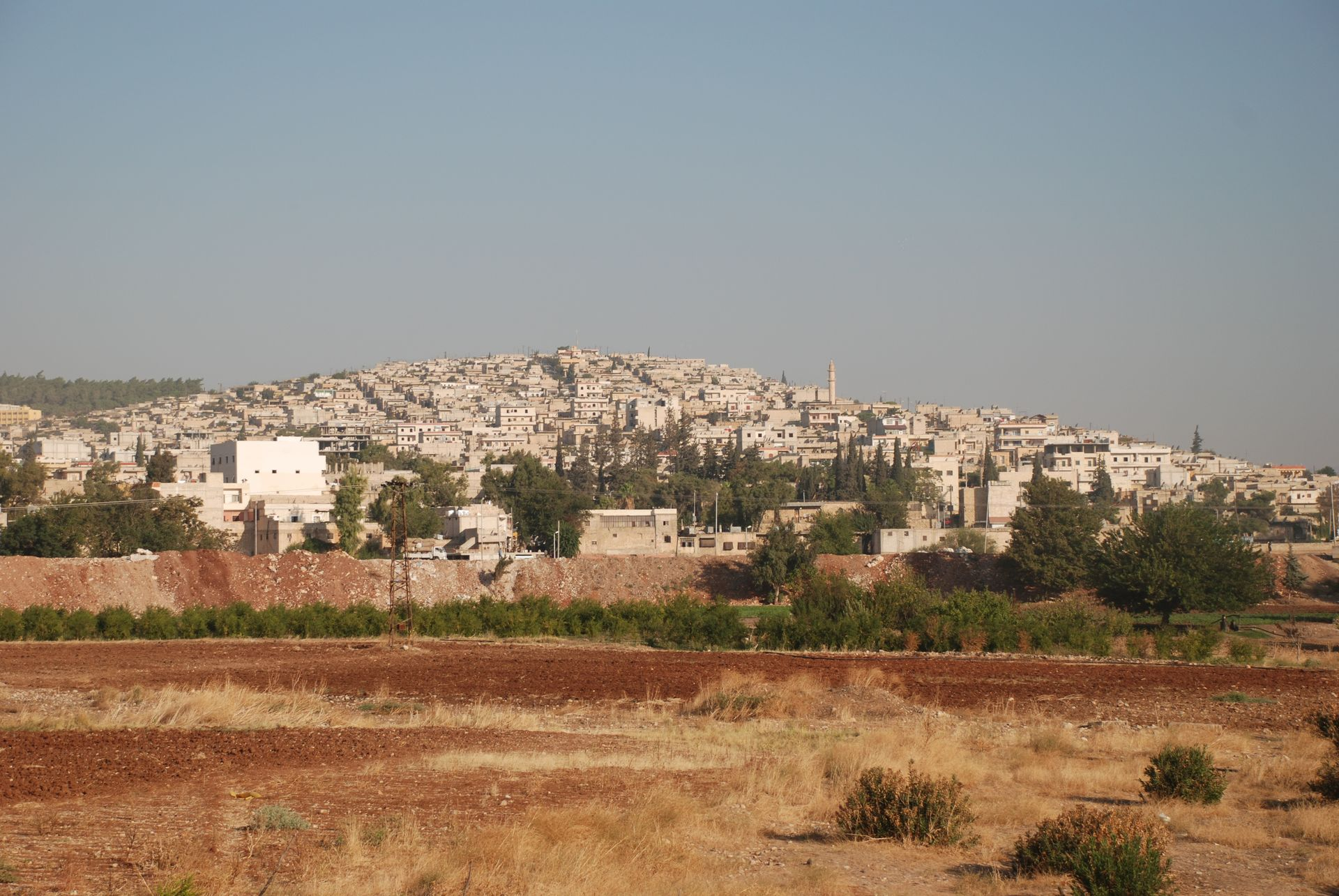
- Afrin, 2009
- Interactive map of Afrin
- Location within Syria
- Coordinates: 36°30′30″N 36°52′9″E
- Country: Syria
- Governorate: Aleppo
- District: Afrin
- Subdistrict: Afrin

Government
  - Mayor: Khero Al-Dawod

Area
  - Total: 3,850 km^{2} (1,490 sq mi)
- Elevation: 270 m (890 ft)

Population (2004 census)
  - Total: 36,562
- Time zone: UTC+3 (Arabia Standard Time)

Afrin (Arabic: عفرين, romanized: Ifrīn; Kurdish: عەفرین, romanized: Efrîn) is a Kurdish majority city in northern Syria. In the Afrin District, it is part of the Aleppo Governorate. The total population of the district as of 2020 was recorded at 172,095 people, of whom 70,000 lived in the town of Afrin itself.

The town and district are named after the Afrin River. The city is split into two distinct halves by the river. It is located in the westernmost part of Syrian Kurdistan.

As a result of Operation Olive Branch, the People's Defense Units of the Autonomous Administration of North and East Syria ("Rojava" or "AANES") withdrew after the city's encirclement from Afrin on 17 March 2018 and the Syrian National Army and Turkish Armed Forces captured Afrin the next day, bringing it under the Turkish occupation of northern Syria.

While thousands fled as the Syrian Democratic Forces of the AANES retreated, an estimated 50,000 to 70,000 people remained in Afrin city after the Turkish capture. After the civil war largely ended, control of the city was transferred to the newly installed Syrian government in early 2025. By October 2025, the Afrin administration announced 20,000 families have returned to Afrin since the fall of the Assad regime.

== History ==
...] ...he/they ...ed away together (?),
and kings (?) [...]ed me up with ... .
[...] raise[d] up the hand to tar-
hunzas,
and [...

— Translation of the surviving inscription from the Afrin Stele.

About 8 km south of the town of Afrin, there are the remains of a Syro-Hittite settlement known as Ain Dara. In a field northwest of the city, a 9th or 8th century BC Luwian stele (named the Afrin stele) was discovered; it is a fragment of a full stele as only the middle section survives, which in turn is damaged with the right side destroyed, taking with it parts of the right edge of the front and left edge of the back. The stele's front shows a part of a relief; a short fringed kilt usually worn by Teshub, the Hittite storm god, is shown. The city fell under the control of the Neo-Assyrian Empire between the 9th and 6th centuries BC, and subsequently under the Neo-Babylonian Empire, Achaemenid Empire and Seleucid Empire

Cyrrhus overlooking the Afrin once served as a military base for the Roman Empire when it conducted campaigns against the Armenian Empire to the north. By the 4th century, it had become an important centre for Christianity with its own bishop.

The Afrin Valley was part of Roman Syria until the Muslim conquest of the Levant in 637. The Afrin was known as Oinoparas (Koine Greek: Οινοπάρας) in the Seleucid era; in the Roman era the name became Ufrenus, whence the Arab vernacular ʿAfrīn, ʿIfrīn, adopted as Kurdish Efrîn.

The area was briefly conquered by the Principality of Antioch but again came under Muslim rule in 1260 following the Mongol invasions. In the Ottoman period, the area was part of the Kilis Province.

Although it is not contiguous with the main area of Kurdish settlement, the Afrin valley seems to have seen Kurdish settlement by at least the 16th-17th centuries, as a British traveller by the name William Biddulph, records in 1599 that a people, called Coords, who "Worship the Devil", dwell in the mountains between İskenderun and Aleppo. It is likely that these were Yezidi Kurds, who have historically been accused of being devil-worshippers by outsiders.

In 18th century, Afrin was referred to as the Sancak of the Kurds in Ottoman documents.

=== Modern era ===
With the drawing of the Syria–Turkey border in 1923, Afrin became detached from Kilis Province and was part of French-administrated Syria (i.e. the State of Aleppo, State of Syria (1924–30), Syrian Republic (1930–58)) and was eventually incorporated in modern Syria at the state's formation in 1961.

The town of Afrin was founded as a market in the 19th century. In 1929, the number of permanent residents was 800, growing to 7,000 by 1968. The town was developed by France under the French mandate of Syria. The main square is Afrin bus station, and the old settlement area stretches northward on the slope of a hill, but more recently habitations have spread to the other side of the river and extend as far to the south-east as the neighboring village of Turandah.

Since the Turkish annexation of Hatay Province in 1939, the Afrin District is now almost surrounded by the Syria–Turkey border, apart from the border with the Azaz District to the east and a short border with the Mount Simeon District to the southeast.

There was an outbreak of civil unrest on 16 March 2004, during which three people were killed by Syrian police. In 1999, the arrest of Kurdish leader Abdullah Öcalan (by the Turkish National Intelligence Organization in Nairobi, Kenya in February 1999) triggered renewed clashes between Kurdish protesters and the police.

=== Civil War ===
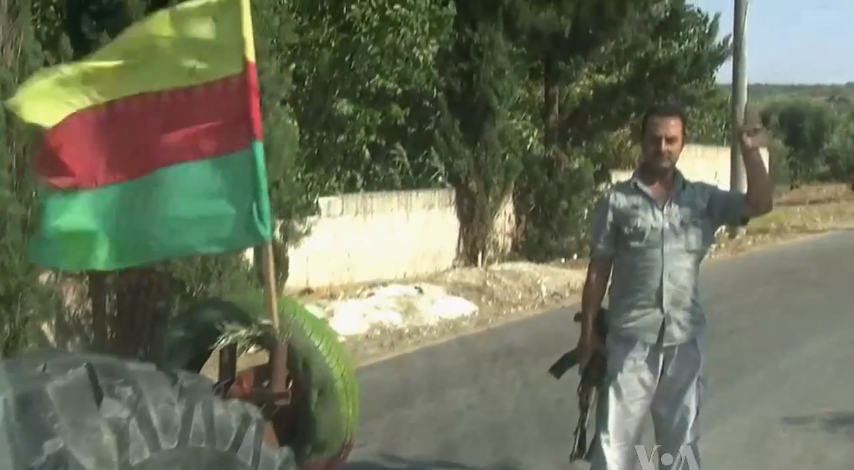
A PYD checkpoint in Afrin (August 2012)

During the Syrian civil war, Syrian government forces withdrew from the city in the summer of 2012. The People's Defense Units took control of the city soon afterward.

Afrin Canton as a de facto autonomous part was declared on 29 January 2014, the town of Afrin being the administrative center. The assembly elected Hêvî Îbrahîm Mustefa prime minister, who later appointed Remzi Şêxmus and Ebdil Hemid Mistefa to work as deputies.

Between 2012 and 2018, the YPG, the official defence force of the canton, was criticized for recruiting child soldiers, committing arbitrary arrests and failing to address unsolved killings and disappearances. According to the reports, the YPG and Asayish were also accused of forcibly recruiting civilians, arresting political activists and displacing Arabs whose homes were later stolen and looted. Displaced Arabs accused the Kurdish security forces of imposing taxes and restrictions on the population in order to force them to leave and change the demography.

=== Turkish military incursion ===
On 20 January 2018, the Turkish army began the Operation Olive Branch alleging that the Government ruling in Afrin were terrorists. On the same day, the Turkish Air Force bombed more than 100 targets in Afrin. On 28 January 2018, Syria's antiquities department and the British-based Syrian Observatory for Human Rights said that Turkish shelling had seriously damaged the ancient temple of Ain Dara at Afrin. Syria called for international pressure on Turkey "to prevent the targeting of archaeological and cultural sites". On 20 February 2018, a Syrian army convoy consisting of 50 vehicles had arrived in Afrin through the Ziyarat border crossing and were deployed to different areas. Five vehicles reached the center of the city of Afrin.

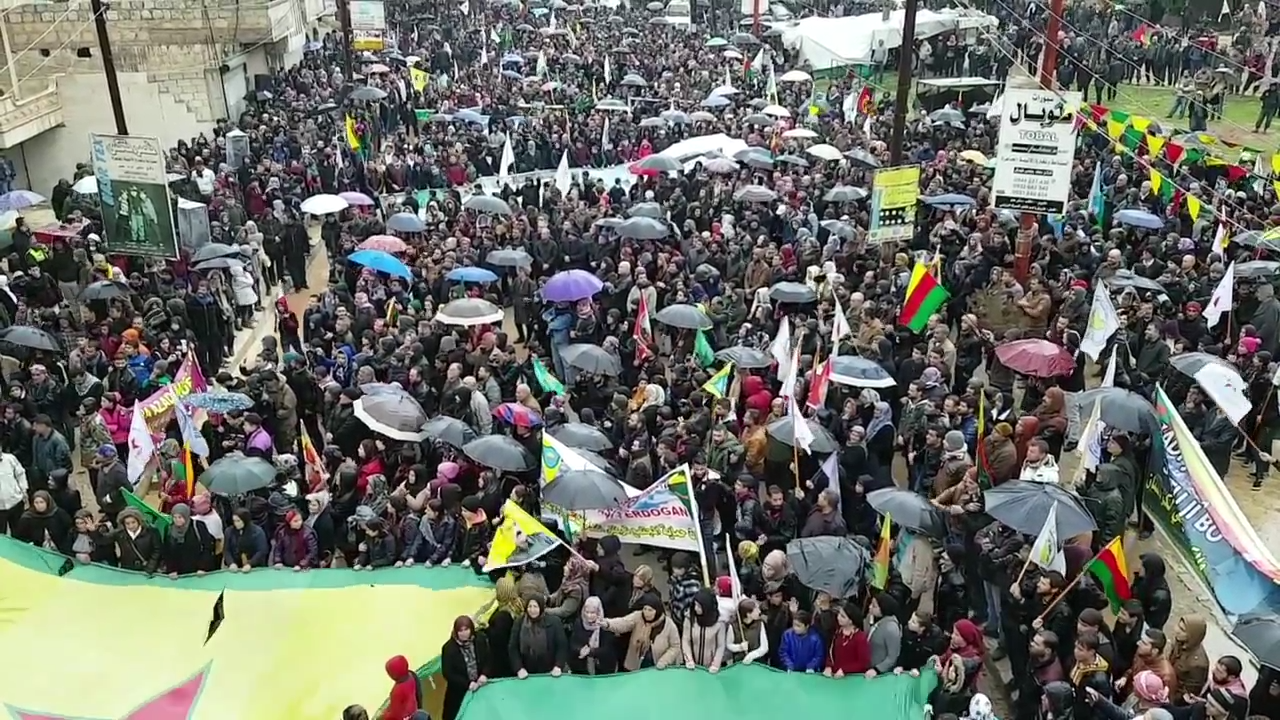
A demonstration in Afrin in support of the Kurdish YPG against the Turkish invasion, 19 January 2018

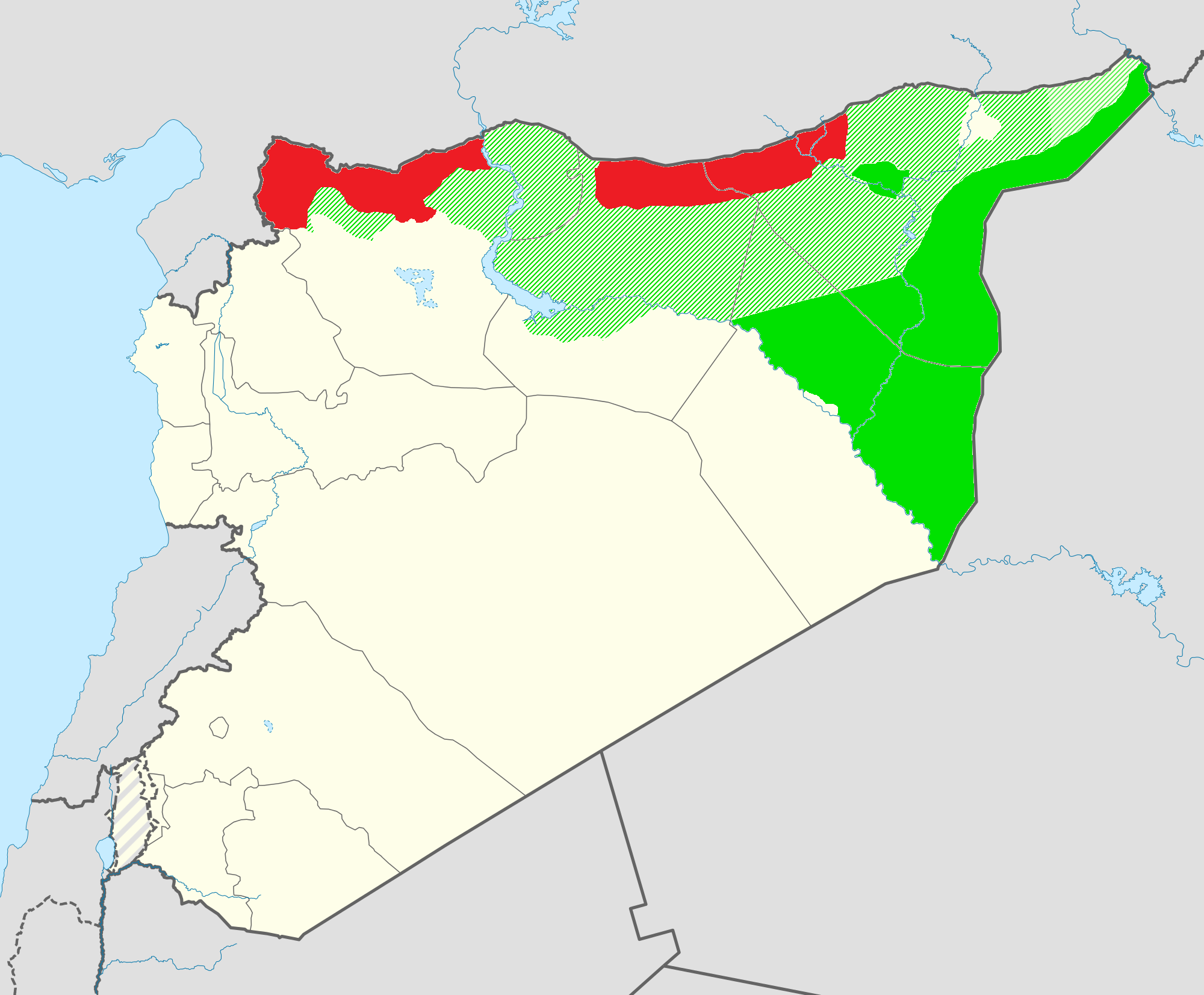
SDF-controlled territory (green) and Turkish-occupied territory (red) in October 2019

On 14 March 2018, Redur Xelil, the senior official of the Syrian Democratic Forces accused Turkey of settling Arab and Turkmen families in the villages captured by Turkish army. A senior Turkish official denied the accusations.

On 18 March 2018, on the 58th day of Operation Olive Branch, the Syrian National Army and the Turkish Armed Forces captured Afrin from the YPG and the YPJ. Shortly after its capture, SNA fighters looted parts of the city and destroyed numerous Kurdish symbols, including a statue of Kāve, as Turkish Army troops solidified control by raising Turkish flags and banners over the city. In areas which were captured by the Olive Branch forces, the Turkish Red Crescent (TRC) has provided population with help which covered the basic needs between 15 February and 15 March 2018.

After the capture of Afrin by the Turkish led forces, the city came under the control of the Government of Turkey, which provides the administration.

On 12 April 2018, a Turkish-backed interim council was elected in Afrin, consisting of 20 "elders from the city" – 11 Kurds, eight Arabs, and one Turkmen, Turkish state media reported. The council is headed by a Kurd named Zuhair Haider who, in an interview with the state-run Anadolu Agency, expressed his gratitude to Turkey and vowed to "serve" the local citizens.

In June 2018, the United Nations published a report stating that the security situation under Turkish-backed rebel control remains volatile. The OHCHR had received reports of lawlessness and rampant criminality, such as theft, harassment, cruel treatment and other abuse, and murders committed by several Turkish-backed armed groups, especially by the Sultan Murad and Hamza Divisions. The OCHR stated that civilians, particularly ethnic Kurds from Afrin, are being targeted for discrimination by the same Turkish-backed fighters.

On 2 August 2018, Amnesty International reported that the Turkish forces were giving Syrian armed groups free rein to commit serious human rights abuses against civilians in the northern city of Afrin. The research had found the Turkish-backed fighters have involved in arbitrary detentions, torture, forced displacement, enforced disappearances, confiscation of property, and looting.

On 28 April 2020, a bombing in Afrin killed 46 people, including 11 children. No group claimed responsibility. Turkey blamed the YPG for the attack.

On 11 October 2021, a car bombing killed at least six people.

Hay'at Tahrir al-Sham (HTS) entered the city on 13 October 2022, during clashes between SNA groups in the region. They later retreated.

A group affiliated with the Syrian caretaker government, described as "Public Security Forces", entered Afrin in early February 2025. In September 2025, the Afrin administration's press unit told the Rudaw Media Network that the Turkish intelligence, provincial, special forces, gendarmerie, counter-terrorism, and police forces in the Syrian Kurd city of Afrin have completely withdrawn from the city center and districts.

== Health care ==
The World Health Organization reported that Afrin counted with four hospitals before March 2018. Starting April 2018, Physical condition in hospitals and health centers has been improved. Hospital health centers in Afrin district center were put into service. In addition, mobile health screening vehicles, which include a team of doctors and nurses, started to provide health services by visiting all towns and villages at certain intervals since the beginning of April 2018. According to the data obtained from the Hatay Governorship, 17 thousand 236 people were examined and 2 thousand 288 people were vaccinated in the health units that started operations in early April and where 68 Turkish personnel were employed. 42 children were born in Afrin State Hospital, where 4 new dialysis devices serve.

== Education ==
In August 2015, the University of Afrin started teaching, with initial programs in literature, engineering and economics, including institutes for medicine, topographic engineering, music and theater, business administration and the Kurdish language. In January 2018, the university closed due to Operation Olive Branch and did not open after the city was captured by Turkish-backed forces. In October 2019, Turkey announced that the University of Gaziantep will open a Faculty of Education in Afrin. In February 2019, it was reported that Turkey was assuming control over the educational matters in Afrin, providing training to teachers and turkifiying the curriculum taught in the schools. BBC also reported that Turkey enabled the establishment of a religious İmam Hatip school in Afrin.

== Economy ==
The olive tree is the symbol of Afrin. Afrin is a production center for olives. Since the Turkish army captured Afrin, the olives have been confiscated by the Turkish backed forces and exported to Turkey. Olive oil pressing and textiles are some of the city's local industries. Since the Turkish capture of Afrin, only companies registered in Turkey are permitted to do business in the city. On 9 November 2018, Turkey's trade minister Ruhsar Pekcan announced the opening of a border gate with Afrin dubbed "Olive Branch" - after the operational name of the Turkish offensive that captured the city months before.

== Infrastructure ==
In late 2018 a delegation from the Turkish Ministry of Energy and Natural Resources inspected the situation in Afrin and instructed a renovation of the electricity infrastructure. On 13 January 2019, body filling, water intake structure, reinforced concrete and mechanical cover systems were completed and repaired by the Turkish State Hydraulic Works (DSI), for Afrin Dam. In this way, the water requirement of the city is re-established.

== Climate ==
Afrin has a hot-summer Mediterranean climate with hot dry summers and cool winters with moderate rain and occasional snow. The average high temperature in January is 9 °C and the average high temperature in July is 34 °C. The snow falls usually in January, February or December. Afrin's yearly rainfall ranges between 500 and 600 mm and the average rate of humidity is 61%. Afrin is surrounded by olive trees.

Climate data for Afrin
| Month | Jan | Feb | Mar | Apr | May | Jun | Jul | Aug | Sep | Oct | Nov | Dec | Year |
|---|---|---|---|---|---|---|---|---|---|---|---|---|---|
| Record high °C (°F) | 18 (64) | 22 (72) | 26 (79) | 35 (95) | 41 (106) | 41 (106) | 43 (109) | 46 (115) | 42 (108) | 38 (100) | 28 (82) | 21 (70) | 46 (115) |
| Mean daily maximum °C (°F) | 9 (48) | 12 (54) | 16 (61) | 22 (72) | 26 (79) | 29 (84) | 34 (93) | 34 (93) | 28 (82) | 25 (77) | 17 (63) | 11 (52) | 22 (72) |
| Daily mean °C (°F) | 6 (43) | 8 (46) | 11 (52) | 16 (61) | 20 (68) | 24 (75) | 28 (82) | 28 (82) | 23 (73) | 20 (68) | 13 (55) | 8 (46) | 17 (63) |
| Mean daily minimum °C (°F) | 2 (36) | 4 (39) | 7 (45) | 11 (52) | 15 (59) | 19 (66) | 22 (72) | 22 (72) | 18 (64) | 15 (59) | 8 (46) | 4 (39) | 12 (54) |
| Record low °C (°F) | −11 (12) | −7 (19) | −7 (19) | 0 (32) | 6 (43) | 10 (50) | 14 (57) | 11 (52) | 6 (43) | 2 (36) | −3 (27) | −6 (21) | −11 (12) |
| Average precipitation mm (inches) | 110 (4.3) | 85 (3.3) | 60 (2.4) | 40 (1.6) | 30 (1.2) | 10 (0.4) | 0 (0) | 0 (0) | 15 (0.6) | 50 (2.0) | 70 (2.8) | 95 (3.7) | 565 (22.3) |
| Average rainy days | 16 | 12 | 10 | 10 | 7 | 3 | 0 | 0 | 3 | 5 | 7 | 15 | 88 |
| Average snowy days | 1 | 1 | 0 | 0 | 0 | 0 | 0 | 0 | 0 | 0 | 0 | 1 | 3 |
| Average relative humidity (%) | 84 | 76 | 69 | 65 | 51 | 49 | 41 | 44 | 52 | 56 | 67 | 83 | 61 |
Source: Weather Online, Weather Base, BBC Weather, MyForecast and My Weather 2

== Notable people ==
- Ebdo Mihemed, Kurdish singer
- Îlham Ehmed, Kurdish politician
- Hêvî Îbrahîm, Kurdish politician
- Arin Mirkan, Kurdish combatant

== See also ==
- Yazidis in Syria
- Operation Olive Branch
