= SDF–Syrian transitional government clashes (2025–2026) =

Clashes in Syria (2025–2026)

- Part of the Aftermath of the Syrian civil war, Eastern Syria insurgency, the aftermath of the fall of the Assad regime
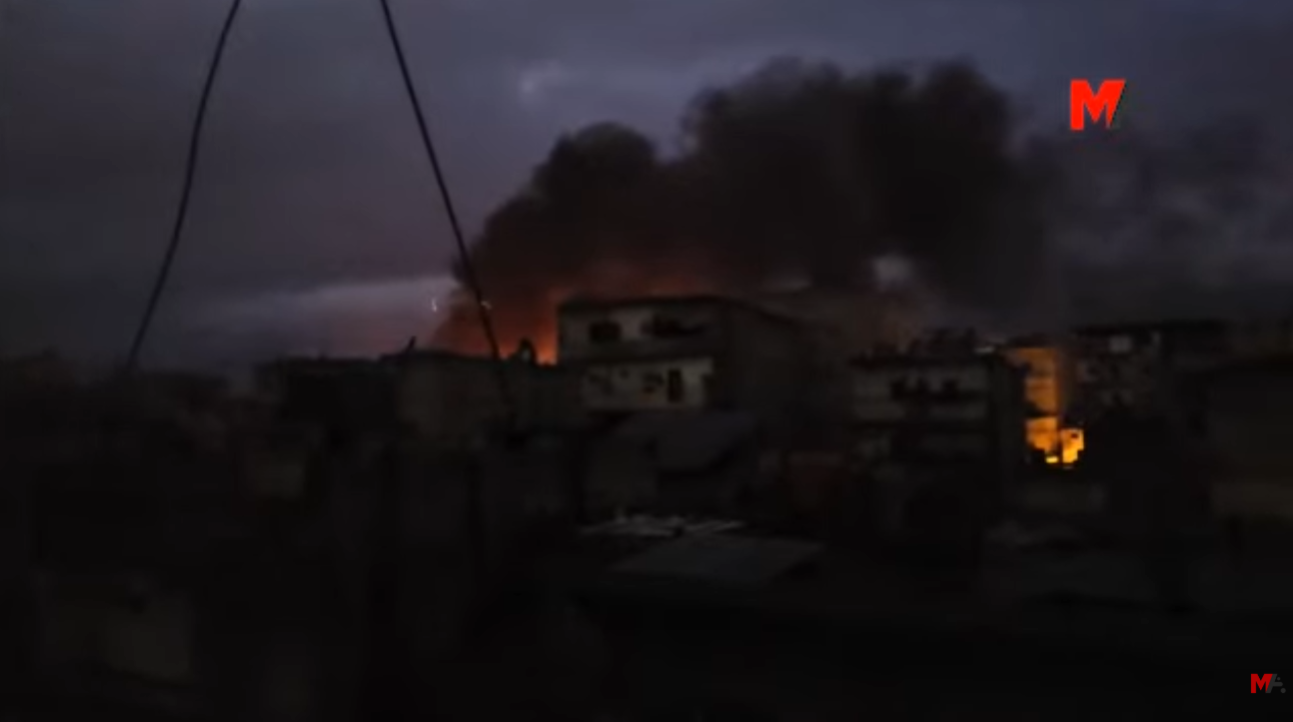
- Sheikh Maqsoud, Aleppo, during clashes in January 2026
| Date | 12 August 2025 – 30 January 2026 (5 months, 2 weeks and 4 days) |
| Location | Along the internal border between the DAANES and Syrian transitional government, particularly near Dayr Hafir, al-Khafsah, and Deir ez-Zor in Syria |
| Result | Syrian government victory; Integration of the Democratic Autonomous Administration of North and East Syria into the Syrian transitional government in August 2026 |

Belligerents
| (Democratic Autonomous Administration of North and East Syria) DAANES PKK (claimed by Syrian transitional government and Turkey) | (Syria) Syria; Supported by: Turkey (Note: Supplied BMC Amazon and Otokar Cobra II MRAP's and infantry mobility vehicles.) Arab Tribal and Clan Forces |

Commanders and leaders
| (Democratic Autonomous Administration of North and East Syria) Salih Muslim # Mazloum Abdi; Ferhad Şamî; Sipan Hamo; Shorsh Tal Aran; Sozdar Derik; Khalil Qahraman; Alif Muhammad; Axîn Nûcan Bahoz Erdal (claimed by Syrian transitional government and Turkey) | Ahmed al-Sharaa; Murhaf Abu Qasra; Ali Noureddine al-Naasan; Anwar al-Saleh al-Hamoud; Sipan Hamo (since 2026); Mohammed al-Jassem; Ahmed Rizk; Abu Hatem Shaqra; Motasem Abbas; Asim Hawari; Anas Khattab; Mohammed Abdul Ghani; Fahim Issa; Doghan Suleiman |

Units involved
| Syrian Democratic Forces; People's Protection Units; Women's Protection Units; Military Councils; Al-Kasra Military Council; Manbij Military Council; Hêzên Komandos; Interior Commission; Asayish; Revolutionary Youth Movement (TCŞ); Afrin Liberation Forces (alleged); PKK (claimed by Syrian transitional government and Turkey) | Syrian Armed Forces; Syrian Army; 60th Division; 62nd Division; 66th Division; 72nd Division; 76th Division; 80th Division; 86th Division; Syrian Air Force; Ministry of Interior; ICS; Supported by: Turkish Armed Forces; Turkish Air Force (reconnaissance); Arab Tribal forces; Al-Shaitat (some); Al-Baggara (some); Shammar tribes; Al-Sanadid Forces |

Strength
| Sheikh Maqsoud and Ashrafieh: At least 1,000 Asayish | Sheikh Maqsoud and Ashrafieh: At least 80 tanks and armored vehicles (per SDF); Tishrin Dam front: At least 2,000 |

Casualties and losses
| Per SDF: 7 killed (Note: 1 killed, 1 killed, 5 killed in "Fedayeen-Style" attack); 17 injured (Note: 5 injured, 3 injured, 9 injured); 8 injured (Note: 2 injured, 4 injured, 2 injured); Per Syrian transitional government: 1+ killed (Note: 1 killed, unspecified number killed); 68+ injured (Note: 9 injured, unspecified number injured, 59 injured) | Per Syrian transitional government: 11–13 killed (Note: 1 killed, 2 killed, During the Siege of Sheikh Maqsoud and Ashrafiyah Syria TV said 1 was killed, while an official Syrian source told Al Jazeera that 3 were killed, 1 killed, 1 killed, 2 killed, 2 killed, 1 killed); 12–14+ injured (Note: 4 injured, Syria TV correspondent said "some" were injured, 3 injured, several injured, On 10 October 2025, Syria TV said 1 was seriously injured, while the Syrian News Channel claimed 3 were injured, 1 injured, unspecified number wounded, 3 injured); 2 vehicles disabled (Note: 2 vehicles disabled) Per SDF: 15+ killed (Note: 1 killed; 1 killed; 13 killed during the Aleppo clashes in January 2026); 3+ injured (Note: 3 injured, Several injured, Several injured); 2 arrested 7 tanks destroyed (Note: 4 tanks destroyed between 6–8 January 2026, 3 tanks destroyed on 10 January 2026); 8 armored vehicles destroyed (Note: 4 armored vehicles destroyed, 2 armored vehicles destroyed 2 armored vehicles destroyed); 2 vehicles seized (Note: 1 vehicle seized, 1 vehicle seized); 14 drones downed (Note: 1 drone downed, 2 drones downed, 7 drones downed between 6–8 January 2026, 1 drone downed, 3 drones downed) |
- Civilians: Dozens killed and hundreds injured (SOHR) (Note: Some examples: , , , , ,)

Sporadic armed skirmishes took place between the Kurdish-led Syrian Democratic Forces (SDF) and the post-Assad Syrian Army, which was mainly composed of anti-Assadist opposition forces originating from the Syrian civil war, along the internal border between the Democratic Autonomous Administration of North and East Syria (DAANES (Note: Also known as AANES)) and the Syrian transitional government from 2025 to 2026.

Initial clashes in January 2026 were sporadic and limited to exchanges of artillery shelling and small- to medium-arms fire in Dayr Hafir, Manbij, al-Khafsah, Deir ez-Zor, and their surrounding areas; however, heavy fighting and bombardments took place in Sheikh Maqsood and Ashrafiyah during the Aleppo clashes. A comprehensive "ceasefire agreement" was signed on 7 October 2025 between the SDF and the Syrian Army, but clashes later resumed in December 2025 and January 2026 as the Syrian Army declared the neighborhoods "legitimate military targets".

Following the January 2026 northeastern Syria offensive by government forces, up to 80% of the DAANES' territory were captured and ceded to the Syrian government as part of an integration agreement. According to the Syrian Observatory for Human Rights, 530 people, including 76 civilians, were killed in clashes between Syria's security and Syrian Democratic Forces.

== Background ==
=== 10 March agreement ===
During the fall of the Assad regime, a period marked by instability and uncertainty, Turkey and its affiliated militant group, the Syrian National Army (SNA), launched various offensives against Kurdish-controlled areas west of the Euphrates.

Following months of fighting, which stalled near the Tishrin Dam, and an SDF counteroffensive in December 2024, SDF leader Mazloum Abdi and the Syrian transitional government, led by Syrian President Ahmed al-Sharaa, signed the US-backed 10 March Agreement. (Note: Also known as March agreement) The agreement implemented a country-wide ceasefire and laid out principles for the integration of the DAANES into the new Syrian government. It envisaged equal representation for minorities in the political process and proposed integrating the SDF's military and civilian structures into the new Syrian state, while allowing the SDF to retain de facto control over border posts and oil fields in Kurdish areas. A follow-up agreement in April, which was reportedly also brokered with American involvement, established a joint security framework for the Kurdish enclaves in Sheikh Maqsood and Ashrafiyeh, Aleppo. The neighborhoods remained under the control of the Asayish, when the SDF left on 4 April 2025 as part of the agreement.

=== Diplomatic tensions ===
Delays in implementing the 10 March agreement, with both sides accusing each other of obstruction, along with the cancellation of the SDF–Syria talks in Paris on 25 July and again on 9–10 August, heightened hostilities between the DAANES and the Syrian government, which, according to Hawar News and the Institute for the Study of War (ISW), was facing increasing Turkish pressure. This pressure stemmed from Ankara's long-standing opposition to an autonomous Kurdish entity on its border, fearing it could fuel Kurdish nationalism in Turkish Kurdistan. Since 2015, Turkey has waged military campaigns against Kurdish forces in Syria and has, after the formation of the new Syrian transitional government, repeatedly threatened further invasions unless they integrate into the state institutions.

==== Integration of SNA militias and foreign fighters ====
The integration of SNA militias and Salafi jihadist fighters (including foreigners) during the Syrian Revolution Victory Conference into the new Syrian Army, along with the appointment of their commanders, was heavily criticized by the SDF, as the sides had in part fought earlier in the year and throughout the Syrian civil war as adversaries. Kurds within the DAANES were particularly critical, as SNA factions had been reported to engage in kidnappings of civilians, looting, beatings, and other human rights violations against Kurds, while minorities like the Alawites and Druze expressed their hostility towards the presence of Salafi jihadist foreign fighters, further leading to tensions between the sides.

==== Alleged government abuses and decentralization demands ====
The New Arab and The Insider also stated that the increasing tensions between the SDF and the Syrian transitional government were exacerbated in part by the Western Syria clashes and Southern Syria Clashes, in which government affiliated forces conducted a series of war crimes and massacres against Alawite and Druze civilians. This, in turn, damaged both the domestic and international standing of the government and intensified calls from various groups for minority rights and federalization. The transitional government was also criticized for failing to ensure minority representation, a key stipulation of the March agreement. Few government officials, and no senior military or security commanders, were drawn from minority communities. In wake of the events the DAANES organized the Conference on Kurdish Unity and Cooperation in Western Kurdistan and the Unity of Components conference in Hasakah, during which Kurdish, Druze, Alawite and Arab tribal leaders, including Sheikh Hikmat al-Hijri and Sheikh Ghazal Ghazal, expressed support for a decentralized Syria. Both conferences were criticized by the transitional government for "violating the 10 March agreement," and the Unity of Components conference, in particular, was cited as a reason for the cancellation of the SDF–Syria talks in Paris. The crisis in Suwayda reportedly "cracked Damascus-SDF relations."

==== Blockade of Sheikh Maqsood and Ashrafiyeh ====
At the beginning of July, tensions in Aleppo increased when government forces blocked fuel supplies from reaching the Kurdish-majority neighborhoods of Sheikh Maqsood and Ashrafiyeh. The Syrian Observatory for Human Rights (SOHR) described the blockade as a continuation of "old regime tactics."

==== Postponed elections ====
In August, government officials confirmed that al-Sharaa was pursuing a centralized government, as opposed to the federalization framework set out by the Kurds as a prerequisite for integration. Later that month the Syrian transitional government announced that elections would not be held in the Druze-controlled governorate of Suwayda and areas under the control of the DAANES, namely Hasakah and Raqqa, for "safety reasons". In response, the DAANES affirmed that the planned elections are not democratic and "do not in any way reflect the will of the Syrian people". It criticised the characterization of areas under DAANES control as "unsafe" and argued that it would "justify the policy of denial" against more than five million Syrians. Furthermore, it called on organisations like the United Nations not to recognize these elections.

=== Increasing military deployments ===
At the same time, some government-aligned members of Arab tribes in Deir ez-Zor particularly from the Al-Shaitat and Al-Baggara tribes called for "jihad and general mobilization" against the SDF and declared their "full support for other tribes and clans in backing the government of the Syrian Arab Republic." This development raised concerns that Arab tribes could be used by the transitional government against the SDF in a manner similar to their earlier use against the Druze in Suwayda. Coinciding increased Islamic State (ISIS) activity prompted additional SDF deployments along the Euphrates. The Alma Research and Education Center explained that the SDF sent "massive" military reinforcements to the Deir ez-Zor area to "fill the security vacuum" left as a result of the extensive withdrawal of American coalition forces. This was seen by some as "a move that directly contradicts the spirit of the [10 March] agreement", Alma Research says. Regional reports also claimed that Damascus had amassed as many as 50,000 troops near Palmyra, with "orders to advance on Raqqa and Deir ez-Zor unless the SDF cedes control", further heightening tensions along the SDF–STG contact line. Government reinforcements were also regularly deployed to the vicinity of Sheikh Maqsoud and Ashrafiyah in what was described as a "show-of-force operation" intended to raise fears of a possible field escalation.

== Clashes ==
=== 2025 ===
In the months following the agreement, the Syrian transitional government engaged in several armed clashes with the SDF, primarily in Deir ez-Zor province, which is divided between the two sides along the Euphrates River, and near the town of Dayr Hafir, where a 20-meter-wide canal separates SDF and Syrian Army forces to the north. In turn both parties accused each other of violating the 10 March agreement.

The first clashes were reported on 2 August 2025 near Dayr Hafir and al-Khafsah. Syria's state-owned Syrian Arab News Agency (SANA) claimed that four Syrian Army soldiers and three civilians were injured during the fighting, and made the SDF solely responsible for the incident.

On 4 August, the SDF accused government-linked factions of attacking four of its positions in the village of Al-Imam, near Manbij.

On 12 August, one Syrian Army soldier was killed in clashes with the SDF near Dayr Hafir. In addition the government's Ministry of Information claimed that two civilians were killed and three injured. Coinciding with the clashes the Foundation for Defense of Democracies (FDD) warned of a 'wider conflict' if the US does not remain fully engaged in preventing the collapse of the March agreement.

On 13 August, the Internal Security Forces (Asayish) claimed that an "interim government-affiliated" drone attack wounded two of its forces in the Kurdish enclave of Sheikh Maqsoud, Aleppo. The Syrian transitional government's Ministry of Defense denied the accusations. That same day the Syrian Observatory for Human Rights (SOHR) reported on a "wide deployment of armoured vehicles, and medium and heavy weapons" by the Syrian Army along the frontline, while the SDF raised its military readiness and reinforced its positions as well.

On 14 August, clashes broke out between the SDF and Syrian Army forces in Deir ez-Zor, amid reports of government armour heading eastwards. Machine guns and mortar fire were reported, injuring some Syrian Army soldiers as well as local fishermen. The pro-government news outlet Enab Baladi reported that one civilian was killed. On the same day the SOHR reported on tribal fighters, led by Abu Hatem Shaqra's 86th Division, which abducted six off-duty SDF fighters in a pharmacy in the town of Gharanij. The following clashes, which included mortar fire coming from government-controlled areas, lead to the death of one tribal fighter and injury of three more, while one SDF vehicle was seized. Two kidnapped members were released later on the same day, while the four others were freed on 16 August. The SDF increased its military presence in the region with over 100 military vehicles and YAT special forces after the events.

On 24 August, the SDF reported that "armed groups affiliated with the Damascus government" launched an attack on a military post of the al-Kasra Military Council in the town of al-Junaynah, Deir ez-Zor's western countryside, violating the ceasefire.

On 31 August, another round of clashes was reported in Tel Ma'az, near Dayr Hafir, between the SDF and the Syrian Army.

Around September, Turkey staged its first airstrikes in months on Kurdish positions, and the Kurds dug new defensive tunnels. Mottassem Abbas, commander of the Syrian Army's 80th Division, said to Reuters in an interview: "We're sending more men and weapons to reinforce [the contact line with the SDF]."

On 10 September, tensions flared, as the SOHR reported mutual shelling in Maskanah between the SDF and the Turkish-backed Suleiman Shah Brigade, a militant group that had been integrated into the Syrian Army as the 62nd Division. No casualties were reported. The FDD reported that clashes on the same day caused the death of two civilians and injury of three more.

On 14 September, clashes broke out between the SDF and Syrian transitional government forces near the al-Asharah-Darnaj bridge. According to a statement by the SDF, the "assault by armed groups linked to the Syrian government" was aimed at securing river crossings for smugglers, a claim confirmed by local sources cited by the SOHR.

On 18 September, local sources reported that Syrian transitional government forces and the SDF exchanged small arms fire near al Baij, Aleppo Governorate. No military casualties have been reported. Another local source reported that a Turkish drone flew over Dayr Hafer approximately two hours before the engagement in nearby al Baij, possibly conducting reconnaissance. On 20 September, the SOHR reported mutual shelling and drone strikes in Dayr Hafir, following an attack on SDF positions by the Syrian Army using drones. In turn, the SOHR reported on the same day that three civilians were injured by shelling from members of the Syrian Army. According to the SDF, the assault on their positions began with drone strikes, followed by heavy artillery shelling that directly targeted homes, killing seven civilians, including women and children, and wounding four others. The SDF held the Syrian Ministry of Defense directly responsible for the 'massacre' and considered its statements of refute "a killing of the truth and a blatant attempt to evade responsibility." The group added that it also repelled a separate drone attack by "Damascus government gunmen" on one of its positions in Dayr Hafer, forcing the attackers to retreat. On 21 September, the SOHR updated its casualty figures, reporting that five women and two children were killed, while four others, including three women, were injured in the attacks by the Syrian Army. On 22 September, the SOHR updated its casualty figures once again, as an injured infant succumbed to his wounds, bringing the total number of civilians killed by the Syrian Army to eight.

On 22 September, the General Command of the Asayish said in a statement, that they thwarted an assault on the Sheikh Maqsoud and Ashrafieh neighborhoods in Aleppo by "rogue factions affiliated with the Ministry of Defense of the Damascus Government." The Asayish claimed to have killed one and injured three of the attackers and to have seized their vehicle, while also downing a drone. The SOHR supported the SDF's account, describing the government's assault as a "sneak attempt [...] to attack a military checkpoint of [the] SDF." On the next day the SOHR reported that the injured, who were taken as captives by the SDF, were released following an agreement between the two sides.

On 23 September, the SOHR reported that four children were seriously wounded after Syrian government forces shelled the village of Zubeida, near Dayr Hafir, with indiscriminate artillery fire. Later that same day one SDF fighter was killed, while another was injured by two kamikaze drones belonging to governmental forces.

On 24 September, two fighters of the Syrian Army's 80th Division were killed by SDF sniper fire, according to reports from both the SOHR and SANA.

On 27 September, the M15 highway between Aleppo and Raqqa, as well as roads leading to Dayr Hafir, were closed by forces affiliated with the Syrian army, coinciding with the entry of Turkish trucks and convoys into Kuweires Military Airport.

On 28 September, SDF drones targeted two government positions in Al-Qashlah village, eastern Aleppo countryside, after both sides exchanged artillery fire near the Tishrin Dam earlier. Areas west of the dam had been handed over to the Syrian transitional government by the SDF earlier in the year under the March agreement, which was intended to prevent further SNA attacks, allow for joint patrols with the SDF, and neutralize the dam as a military target. By the beginning of October, Kurdish news outlets reported that the Syrian Army had escalated measures by constructing earthen barriers and blocking roads on the outskirts of Sheikh Maqsoud and Ashrafiyah, as well as barricading streets and establishing positions inside residential buildings. The SOHR confirmed the Syrian army's military buildup near the neighbourhoods. Furthermore, the Syrian government's Ministry of Defense sent a convoy of reinforcements, comprising dozens of vehicles carrying weapons and soldiers, to frontlines with the SDF around Dayr Hafer and the Tishrin Dam. The SOHR added that the reinforcements included non-Syrian fighters.

On 1 October, clashes broke out near the Tishrin Dam after pro-government forces attempted to infiltrate SDF military positions. The attack was repelled, forcing the assailants to withdraw. The locality was shelled by government forces earlier that day.

On 5 October, heavy clashes were reported between the SDF and the Syrian transitional government near Dayr Hafir and the Tishrin Dam. Earlier that day, the fighting was preceded by two drone strikes carried out by the Syrian Army, one targeting an agricultural tractor on the road between Dayr Hafir and Aleppo, and another striking an unidentified target; injuring one civilian. The SDF claimed that three fighters and four Asayish members were injured during the clashes and that the government targeted residential buildings with artillery fire. The state-run SANA agency, described the SDF claims as "false and misleading." On the same day, Rudaw and the SOHR reported that Syrian government forces closed the last remaining highway crossing near Ma'adan and Ithriya between DAANES- and government-controlled areas, following the earlier closure of roads leading to Dayr Hafir on 27 September. In retaliation the SDF closed all river crossings into government areas across the Euphrates.

==== October 2025 Aleppo clashes ====
Escalations peaked in early October during the siege of the Kurdish-majority neighborhoods of Sheikh Maqsoud and Ashafiyah, Aleppo.

On the early hours of 6 October, an explosion of unknown origin occurred in the Ashrafiyah neighborhood, damaging a hospital. Later that day the government closed all seven roads leading into Sheikh Maqsoud and Ashrafiyah, placing the two quarters "under a complete siege." The Transitional Government provided no explanation for the move. On the same evening, large protests by local residents took place in front of Syrian military positions, during which protesters chanted Mazloum Abdi's name, demanded an end to the blockade, and called on the SDF to "liberate" Aleppo. The protest was met with live ammunition and tear gas, according to the SOHR and several Kurdish outlets. Hawar News said that when the protest escalated, residents seized an armored vehicle belonging to Syrian transitional government fighters and handed it over to Kurdish security forces in the neighborhood. North Press Agency claimed that 15 civilians were injured by the Syrian government forces' use of violence. After dispersing the protesters, heavy clashes erupted between Syrian transitional government fighters and Kurdish security forces stationed in Aleppo. The UK Representation of the Syrian Democratic Council (SDC) claimed additionally that 50 civilians were injured by the Syrian Army's heavy artillery shelling on the neighbourhoods. In a statement, the government's Ministry of Defense claimed that the operation constituted a "redeployment and repositioning," asserting that "there are no intentions for any military operations." State-run Syria TV and SANA reported that one government fighter was killed and three others were injured in the clashes, while shifting responsibility to the SDF for the fighting. An official Syrian source told Al Jazeera that three government fighters were killed. During the fighting internet and telecommunications networks had been completely cut off. A local ceasefire agreement for the area was reached in the early hours of 7 October. Following the clashes, Kurdish media reported that two civilians were killed and more than 60 others were injured, while Syrian state media claimed that one civilian was killed and five were injured. The SOHR confirmed the death of one civilian and one government fighter. Demonstrations were held across several Kurdish-majority cities in north and east Syria in solidarity with the residents of Sheikh Maqsoud and Ashrafieh. The seized armored vehicle was later returned to the Syrian transitional government by SDF forces as part of the ceasefire conditions.

On 8 October, the SOHR reported that government forces continued to enforce a blockade on Sheikh Maqsoud and Ashrafiyah despite the ceasefire agreement.

On 9 October, the SDF and the Syrian transitional government exchanged accusations of provoking clashes near the Tishrin Dam. Both sides confirmed the death of one government fighter and the injury of several others. That same day, some of the roads leading into Sheikh Maqsoud were reopened; however, vital roads between DAANES administered territory and areas controlled by the transitional government remained closed according to the SOHR. In the evening, another round of clashes occurred near Deir ez-Zor. The SDF and SOHR reported the death of an SDF fighter and the injury of nine others. Syrian state media confirmed these losses while also claiming that a Syrian Army fighter was killed and another was seriously injured as a result of the clashes.

On 12 October, the SOHR reported that government forces continued its blockade of the Ithriya highway leading into DAANES territory.

On 22 October, the SDF and government forces traded mortar fire near Dayr Hafir.

On 25 October, clashes were reported in Abu Hamam, Deir ez-Zor. Separately SDF and government fighters engaged in fighting near Makhna and Diban, Deir ez-Zor.

On 29 October, the Syrian Ministry of Defense claimed that two of its soldiers were killed and another seriously injured after being allegedly targeted by SDF missile fire. The SDF denied the accusation on the same day, stating that the casualties occurred during demining operations carried out by government forces in the area.

The beginning of November remained largely calm; however, sporadic clashes occurred between the SDF and government forces in eastern Raqqa Governorate during the night of 13–14 November, with no casualties reported.

On 15–16 November, clashes continued near Ghanem Ali, close to Ma'adan, involving drones as well as medium and heavy weapons, leading to several government vehicles being damaged. Reports also indicated that both sides brought in additional reinforcements, including special forces, while the SOHR reported that government reinforcements had been stationed at a school in Ma'adan. DAANES-based Hawar News reported, that the SDF raised its alert level to its "highest point" following the fighting.

==== SDF claims of ISIS–Syrian government collaboration ====
On 19 November, the SDF shot down one (per SOHR) or two (per SDF) government-operated drones near Ghanem Ali, an area that had seen clashes during the previous week. Later the same day, the SDF accused the Syrian transitional government of "coordinating with foreign ISIL [Islamic State] elements and enabling them to use their sites to conduct reconnaissance missions and drone attacks" against SDF forces. The SDF also released video footage, reportedly retrieved from the shot down drone's memory card, that appeared to show militants wearing ISIL patches preparing drones. The transitional government did not respond to the allegations. During the night of 19–20 November, SDF forces announced that they had launched an assault on "several sites [...] used by ISIL," lying in government controlled areas, particularly near Ghanem Ali and Ma'adan. According to the SOHR, six government forces were killed, four were wounded, and three positions were captured by SDF fighters. Syria's Ministry of Defense, however, reported two soldiers killed and several wounded, denied losing any positions, and claimed that an unspecified number of SDF fighters had been killed or injured in the clashes. Clashes, accompanied by artillery shelling and drone activity, continued through the night of 20 November.

On 22 November, skirmishes occurred in Abu Hamam and Dayr Hafir.

Toward the end of the month, minor skirmishes persisted along the contact line, accompanied by heightened kamikaze drone activity, which injured one Asayish member on 26 November 2025.

==== December 2025 Aleppo clashes ====
On 22 December, the Syrian government claimed that the SDF had targeted a checkpoint in Aleppo city, injuring two civil defense personnel. This was followed by a counterstatement of the SDF alleging that a Syrian government attack wounded two members of the Asayish. The SOHR supported the SDF's account. Fighting subsequently broke out and continued into the evening, with reports of artillery shelling, heavy gunfire, and the closure of key roads in the city. According to the SOHR, artillery shelling originating from Syrian government-controlled areas killed at least three civilians and injured more than 22 others, actions the organization described as possible war crimes. The SOHR also reported that one Syrian government fighter was killed. Although both sides agreed to a ceasefire before midnight, the SOHR stated the following day that the Kurdish neighborhoods remained under siege, with electricity and water cut off, key roads closed, and internet services disrupted.

On 26 December, clashes resumed in Sheikh Maqsoud and Ashrafiyah, Aleppo after the Syrian transitional government and the SDF accused each other of escalatory actions. The DAANES security force Asayish stated that it had been targeted by RPG fire from government-controlled areas and released video footage of the alleged rocket attack, while the Syrian government stated that one of its security personnel had been injured by gunfire originating from Kurdish-controlled areas, leading to fighting. The SOHR supported the SDF's account. The brief clashes were followed by the deployment of Syrian Army tanks near the Kurdish neighborhoods.

On 27 December, the SOHR reported that the Syrian government had closed additional roads leading into Sheikh Maqsoud and Ashrafiyah and prevented civilians from accessing the areas.

On 29–30 December, clashes erupted near the Tishrin Dam, leading to three injured SDF fighters, which was confirmed by the group itself and the SOHR. In response, the SDF claimed to have reacted to these "serious escalations" by government-aligned forces, by targeteing a military vehicle in addition to a military outpost, resulting in casualties. Coinciding a government-operated kamikaze drone targeted a civilian truck in Sheik Maqsoud causing material damage.

=== 2026 ===
On 5 January 2026, the Syrian Defense Ministry accused the SDF of having targeted a checkpoint in the vicinity of Dayr Hafir, which led to the injury of three personnel, while two vehicles were disabled. The SDF rejected the claims in a statement, saying that the incident was a traffic accident between a civilian car and a government vehicle. Following these accusations, government forces shelled SDF positions near Dayr Hafir with heavy artillery.

==== January 2026 Aleppo clashes ====
On 6 January, clashes escalated across Aleppo Governorate. The Asayish in Sheikh Maqsoud and Ashrafieh accused Syrian government forces of injuring two civilians in a kamikaze drone strike earlier in the day. In response, the Asayish targeted a Syrian government vehicle on the Castello Road in northern Aleppo, killing one soldier and injuring four others from the 72nd Division, the SOHR reported. The Syrian government also confirmed one killed soldier. In response, government forces shelled Sheikh Maqsoud with heavy artillery. The shelling landed in densely populated areas, the SOHR reported. At the same time, fighting intensified near Dayr Hafir and around the Tishrin Dam, where government-affiliated factions reportedly damaged electricity infrastructure through mortar, drone, and artillery attacks.

On 7 January, government bombardments and attacks on Sheikh Maqsoud and Ashrafieh intensified in what the SOHR described as "one of the harshest waves of terror," after the Syrian government declared all Kurdish military positions in the neighborhoods to be "legitimate targets." Thousands of civilians were displaced. The Syrian Army also attempted to enter the areas with armored vehicles, including tanks, but these efforts were repelled by the Asayish. According to the SOHR, fighting that day killed at least one Asayish member and four Syrian Army soldiers. On 8 January, clashes continued as the Syrian Army was trying to infiltrate the neighbourhoods, while continuing its indiscriminate artillery shelling, and hitting the Othman Hospital in Sheikh Maqsoud. In a preliminary report the SOHR documented the death of 8 civilians and injury of nearly 60 others. Turkish drones reportedly provided support for Syrian Army ground incursions after repeated failures to advance into the Kurdish neighborhoods over the course of the day. In the late evening hours, Syrian Army forces, succeeded in partially infiltrating the Ashrafieh neighborhood after fighters from the al-Baggara tribe defected and opened access to the area. However, they failed to secure long-term control, as fighting persisted throughout the night. At the end of the day the SOHR updated the civilian death count to 25.

On 9 January, the Syrian government declared a unilateral ceasefire to take effect at 03:00 local time and offered Kurdish fighters in the neighborhoods the option to evacuate to Kurdish-controlled areas in northeastern Syria, after having captured the Ashrafieh neighbourhood. However, the Kurdish councils in the neighborhoods rejected the proposal, describing it as "a call to surrender," and stated that Kurdish forces would instead "defend their neighborhoods." Fighting erupted again, with hours-long artillery shelling and drone strikes by the Syrian Army, resulting in multiple claims of human rights violations from the Syrian Observatory for Human Rights.

On 10 January, as fighting continued in Aleppo, mutual shelling occurred near the Tishrin Dam and Dayr Hafir between the SDF and government forces. According to the SOHR, the government-controlled Kuweires Military Airport was subjected to "intense shelling."

==== 2026 northeastern Syria offiensive ====
On 13 January, the Syrian government entered Dayr Hafir and Maskanah after the SDF agreed to withdraw from the area. According to SOHR, the SDF were attacked during the withdrawal.

==== Ceasefire and aftermath ====
On 18 January 2026, a 14-point ceasefire agreement with the SDF, negotiated through the US envoy Tom Barrack, was announced, under which the SDF is set to be integrated into the Syrian government, and the governorates of Raqqa and Deir ez-Zor immediately handed over to the government, together with the administration of prisoner-of-war camps for Islamic State members, all border crossings and oil fields. By 30 January, both sides had further agreed to withdraw fighters from frontlines, allow government forces into Kurdish strongholds like al-Hasakah and Qamishli, integrate SDF fighters and institutions into state structures, recognize Kurdish civil and educational rights, and permit displaced persons to return.

On 3 August 2025, Hasakah Governor Noureddin Issa Ahmed stated that the integration of the DAANES into the Syrian system was 70 percent complete, including "education, health care, agriculture and culture," whereas the "final step," the complete dissolution of the SDF and DAANES, was not yet possible. However, four SDF brigades had already been integrated into the Syrian Armed Forces. According to Jihan Said Hassam, director of the Qamishli Subdistrict, the dissolution of the SDF was imminent.

In an interview with Rudaw Media Network on 15 August, SDF Commander-in-Chief Mazloum Abdi said he did not want to use the term "dissolution," preferring to describe the process as the SDF’s gradual integration into the Syrian army. He added that some SDF forces had already been integrated, trained, and were operating as part of the army, while more than half of its fighters had yet to be incorporated. He said that integration efforts were continuing and that he expected the SDF’s full integration into the Syrian army to be completed soon.

On 20 August, during the centenary celebrations of the city of Qamishli, SDF Commander-in-Chief Mazloum Abdi declared that the integration of the military, security, and administrative institutions into the Syrian state had been completed and that non-Syrian fighters affiliated with the SDF had withdrawn. However, other media reported that Abdi stopped short of announcing the SDF's dissolution and that issues such as the integration of the Women's Protection Units remained unresolved.

== Diplomacy ==
=== SDF–Syrian government ===
In the first week of September 2025, SDF representatives met with Syrian government officials in the DAANES with the aim of restoring the March agreement and reducing tensions. The parties agreed to suspend military reinforcements, establish joint committees, and implement measures to protect civilians and promote stability. Later that month the SOHR said there were "ongoing negotiations" between the SDF and the Syrian transitional government to stand down from the state of high alert.

While attending a gathering in New York, Syrian President Ahmed al-Sharaa warned of potential military action if the SDF did not disband, suggesting that neither Damascus nor Turkey would permit the SDF to continue operating. An intact SDF "may lead to a large-scale war" and put "Iraq and Turkey at great risk, as well as the Syrian state", he added.

At the end of September, Enab Baladi reported that the talks between both sides have stalled. SDF spokesperson Ferhad Shami stated that the SDF, as a "military, social, political, and administrative organization," could not simply be "absorbed" into the Syrian state if the government continued to act like the former Ba'ath regime by "focusing solely on security and military matters."

In October, a new round of talks between the SDF and the Syrian transitional government, scheduled to take place in Damascus under US mediation, collapsed. A source close to the SDF told Al-Arabiya Al-Hadath that the Syrian transitional government had "refused to meet" with SDF officials for negotiations.

On 6 October, SDF leaders met with US officials, including Special Envoy Tom Barrack and CENTCOM Commander Admiral Brad Cooper, who led a delegation from the International Coalition.

==== Ceasefire agreement ====
On 7 October, following heavy clashes between the SDF and the transitional government during the siege of Sheikh Maqsoud and Ashrafiyah, a delegation consisting of SDF General Commander Mazloum Abdi, Co-chair of the Department of Foreign Relations Îlham Ehmed, and Women's Protection Units (YPJ) Commander Rojhilat Afrin met with Syrian president Ahmed al-Sharaa, Defense Minister Murhaf Abu Qasra, and Foreign Minister Asaad al-Shaibani.

The US-backed meeting resulted in the signing of a comprehensive ceasefire agreement between both sides across "all fronts and deployment areas." Defense minister Abu Qasra wrote on X that "the implementation of this agreement [would] begin immediately."

==== Integration deadline ====
The Syrian government and Turkey had set a deadline of 31 December 2025 for the SDF to integrate into the state. However, Western and Kurdish sources told Reuters on 18 December that an extension of the 10 March integration agreement's deadline was likely.

On 29 December, SDF chief Abdi was expected to travel to Damascus to meet al-Sharaa for integration talks; however, his visit was delayed indefinitely due to "logistical and technical arrangements."

=== Turkey ===
The Institute for the Study of War assessed that constant Turkish invasion rhetoric both directly threatens the SDF and encourages the Syrian government to increase political and military pressure on it.

== Reactions ==
=== Domestic ===
- Druze community: Dozens of Druze staged a sit-in protest in Suwayda in solidarity with residents of Sheikh Maqsoud and Ashrafieh during the Aleppo clashes in January 2026, holding Kurdish and SDF flags.

=== Sanctions threat ===
After the January 2026 fighting in Aleppo, several US senators began calling for the reintroduction of sanctions on Syria, and called for a strong reaction if fighting resumes. Senator Lindsey Graham threatened to reinstate the Caesar Act if the conflict continued. Multiple European Union members of parliament also called for the suspension of European aid to Syria due to the clashes.

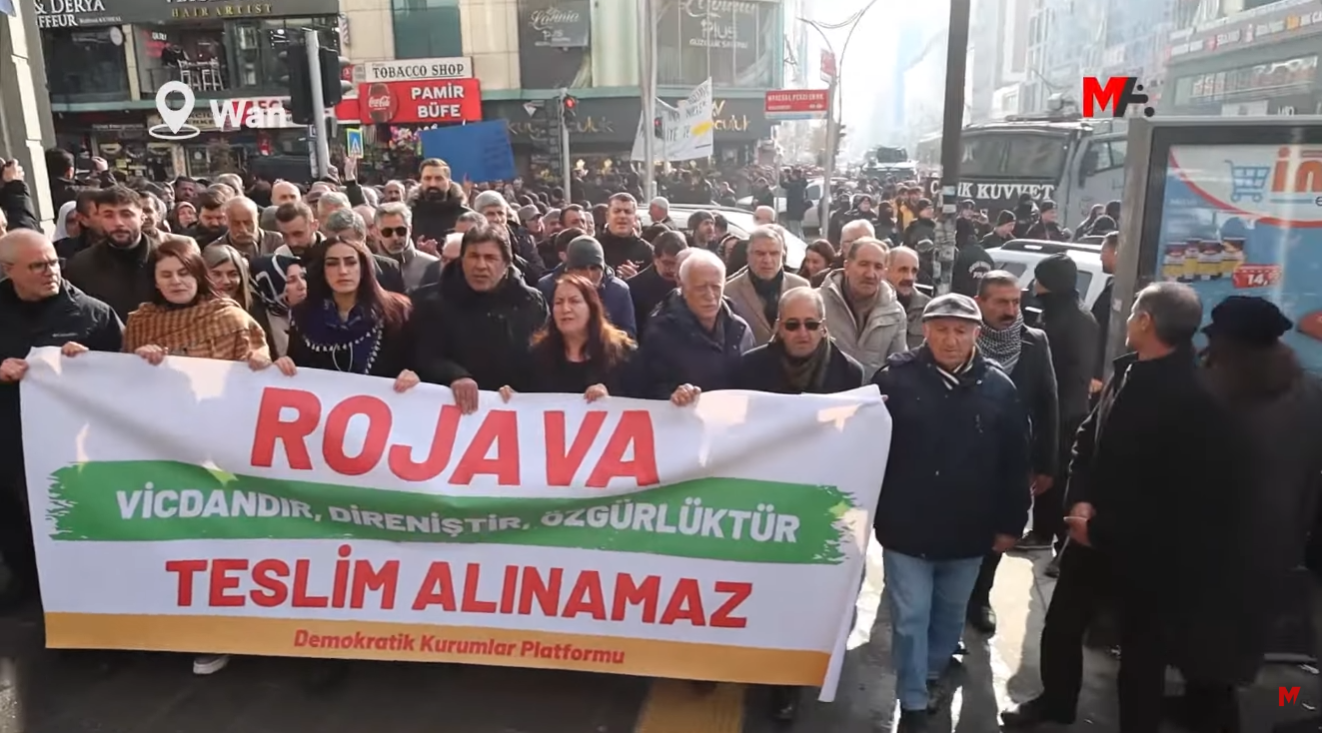
Kurds in Van, Turkey, protesting in support of Sheikh Maqsoud and Ashrafieh during the Aleppo clashes.

=== International ===
- United States: The National reported that the US "renewed a diplomatic push to resolve critical differences between Syria's new central authorities and the [...] Syrian Democratic Forces that threaten to spark an all-out conflict [...], as violence between the two sides escalate[d]."
- Israel: During the Aleppo clashes, Israeli Foreign Minister Gideon Sa'ar warned that attacks on Kurds in Aleppo are "dangerous and alarming" and that "the international community in general, and the West in particular, has a moral debt toward the Kurds who fought bravely and successfully against ISIS."
- Kurdistan Region: The influential Kurdish leader of the Kurdistan Democratic Party (KDP), Masoud Barzani, criticized the bombardment of Sheikh Maqsoud and Ashrafieh during the Aleppo clashes, raising serious concerns about possible ethnic-based targeting of Kurds. Similarly, Bafel Talabani, leader of the Patriotic Union of Kurdistan (PUK), expressed his "deep concerns" over the events in Aleppo.
- Turkish Kurds: Thousands of protesters gathered in Diyarbakır and other Kurdish-majority cities in Turkey to denounce the Syrian government during the Aleppo clashes, holding banners stating "Defending Rojava means defending humanity," while demonstrators chanted slogans such as "Long live the resistance of Rojava," "Long live the resistance of Sheikh Maqsoud," "Women, life, freedom," and "Murderer HTS, collaborator ISIS."
- Kurdish diaspora: Several demonstrations were announced and held by the Kurdish diaspora in Germany, Austria, France, and Greece during the Aleppo clashes.
