= Aleppo clashes (2025–2026) =

Clashes between the SDF and the Syrian government

- Part of the SDF–Syrian transitional government clashes, the aftermath of the Syrian civil war
- Military situation as of 10 January 2026
Date	5 October 2025 – 10 January 2026 (3 months and 6 days)
Location	Aleppo, Aleppo Governorate, Syria
Result	Syrian government victory; Evacuation of SDF and Asayish forces to northeastern Syria
Territorial changes	Syrian government captures Sheikh Maqsood, Ashrafiyah and Bani Zaid neighbourhoods

Belligerents
Democratic Autonomous Administration of North and East Syria	(Syria) Syrian transitional government (Note: The provisional government of Syria.)

Commanders and leaders
(Democratic Autonomous Administration of North and East Syria) Salih Muslim; Mazloum Abdi; Ferhad Şamî; Sipan Hamo; Ziyad Halab †; Alif Muhammad; Axîn Nûcan	(Syria) Ahmed al-Sharaa; Murhaf Abu Qasra; Ali Noureddine al-Naasan; Ahmed Rizk; Asim Hawari; Anas Khattab; Mohammed Abdul Ghani; Fahim Issa; Doghan Suleiman

Units involved
Interior Commission; Asayish; Revolutionary Youth Movement (TCŞ); Afrin Liberation Forces (alleged); Syrian Democratic Forces (Syrian government claim, denied by SDF)	Syrian Armed Forces; Syrian Army; (Syria) 60th Division; 72nd Division; 80th Division; Syrian Air Force; Ministry of Interior; General Security Service

Casualties and losses
5+ killed 6+ injured Per SDF; 5 killed (2026 only); Per Syrian transitional government: Unspecified number killed (2026 only); 59 wounded Remaining garrison surrendered and evacuated (2026 only)	(Syria) 28+ killed (Syria) 3+ injured

The Aleppo clashes (2025–2026) were a series of clashes between the Syrian transitional government and Syrian Democratic Forces in Aleppo. The fighting was centered around the Sheikh Maqsood and Ashrafiyah neighborhoods, both of which are Kurdish-majority districts and under the control of the Democratic Autonomous Administration of North and East Syria-affiliated Asayish police force. The clashes came to an end after the neighborhoods came under the control of the Syrian Army in January 2026.

== Background ==
Since the beginning of the Syrian civil war, Sheikh Maqsoud and Ashrafiyah have been under local Kurdish administration and maintained a semi-autonomous status within Aleppo. Tensions between the Kurdish authorities and government-aligned forces have occasionally flared due to disputes over control, movement, and security in these districts.

=== 10 March agreement ===
During the fall of the Assad regime in December 2024, Turkey and its affiliated militant group, the Syrian National Army, launched various offensives against Kurdish-controlled areas east of the Euphrates. Following months of fighting, which stalled near the Tishrin Dam, and an SDF counteroffensive in December 2024, SDF leader Mazloum Abdi and Syrian president Ahmed al-Sharaa signed the U.S.-backed 10 March agreement, (Note: Also referred to as the March agreement.) which implemented a country-wide ceasefire and laid out principles for the integration of the DAANES into the new Syrian government. It envisaged equal representation for minorities in the political process and proposed integrating the SDF's military and civilian structures into the new Syrian state, while allowing the SDF to retain de facto control over border posts and oil fields in Kurdish areas. A follow-up agreement in April, which was reportedly also brokered with American involvement, established a joint security framework for the Kurdish enclaves in Sheikh Maqsood and al-Ashrafiyah, Aleppo. The neighborhoods remained under the control of the Asayish and several smaller Aleppo-based Kurdish groups.

Delays in implementing the 10 March agreement, with both sides accusing each other of obstruction, along with the cancellation of the SDF–Syria talks in Paris on 25 July and again on 9–10 August, heightened hostilities between the AANES and the Syrian government, which, according to Hawar News Agency and the Institute for the Study of War, was facing increasing Turkish pressure.

On 4 April, an agreement was reached in Aleppo between the neighborhood councils of Ashrafiyah and Sheikh Maqsoud and the Syrian governments' presidential committee to implement the terms of a settlement with the SDF, which had controlled the two neighborhoods for several years. Under the agreement, a security center affiliated with the Syrian Ministry of Interior would be established in both neighborhoods, while the main checkpoints would remain under the supervision of the Asayish and the ministry's internal security forces.

=== Rising tensions ===
In the beginning of July 2025, tensions in Aleppo increased when government forces blocked fuel supplies from reaching the Kurdish-majority and SDF-controlled neighborhoods of Sheikh Maqsood and al-Ashrafiyah. The Syrian Observatory for Human Rights described the blockade as a continuation of "old regime tactics." In August, Nouri Sheikho, Deputy Head of the General Council of Sheikh Maqsood and Ashrafiyeh, told Kurdistan24 that tensions had risen in recent days following the "Unity of Components" conference in Hasakah.

Government reinforcements were subsequently regularly deployed to the vicinity of Sheikh Maqsood and al-Ashrafiyah in what was described as a "show-of-force operation" intended to raise fears of a possible field escalation.

== October 2025 ==
By the beginning of October, Kurdish news outlets reported that the Syrian Army had escalated measures by constructing earthen barriers and blocking roads on the outskirts of Sheikh Maqsood and al-Ashrafiyah, as well as barricading streets and establishing positions inside residential buildings. The SOHR confirmed the Syrian army's military buildup near the neighbourhoods.

Before fighting erupted in Aleppo, tensions escalated on 5 October, between the SDF and government forces in Dayr Hafir, east of Aleppo.

On 6 October 2025, clashes erupted between forces affiliated with the Syrian Democratic Forces and government troops in the neighborhoods of Ashrafiyah and Sheikh Maqsoud. Following the confrontation, government forces closed all roads leading into the two neighborhoods, effectively restricting movement and access. Residents protested the closures, demanding freedom of movement, and some demonstrations were met with tear gas and live fire by security forces.

Heavy exchanges of fire, including small arms and medium weapons, were reported in the neighborhoods, resulting in casualties on both sides and displacing some families. Kurdish authorities accused the government-aligned forces of attempting to infiltrate the neighborhoods and targeting civilians. The Syrian Ministry of Defense stated that army movements in northern and northeastern Syria respond 'to repeated SDF attacks on civilians and security forces'. Calm returned to the Kurdish-majority neighborhoods of Sheikh Maqsoud and Ashrafiyah after a preliminary agreement between Syrian government forces and the Syrian Democratic Forces.

On 7 October, following the heavy clashes between the SDF and the Transitional Government, a delegation consisting of SDF General Commander Mazloum Abdi, Co-Chair of the Department of Foreign Relations Ilham Ahmed, and Women's Protection Units (YPJ) Commander Rojhilat Afrin met with transitional government leader Ahmed al-Sharaa, Defense Minister Murhaf Abu Qasra, and Foreign Minister Asaad al-Shaibani. The brief clashes from 5–7 October resulted in 3 deaths and over 26 injuries.

The U.S.-backed meeting resulted in the signing of a comprehensive ceasefire agreement between both sides across "all fronts and deployment areas." Defense minister Abu Qasra wrote on X that "the implementation of this agreement [would] begin immediately."

== December 2025 ==
On 22 December 2025, clashes erupted between Syrian transitional government forces and the Syrian Democratic Forces (SDF). The Syrian government stated that SDF units had targeted a checkpoint in Aleppo, injuring two civil defense personnel. In response, the SDF alleged that a Syrian government attack wounded two members of the Asayish.

The clashes began during a visit by a high-level Turkish delegation to Damascus, including the Ministers of Foreign Affairs and Defense as well as the head of intelligence, and shortly before the reported end-of-year deadline for implementing the 10 March agreement.

Fighting initially involved small arms before escalating to artillery and medium- and heavy-weapons fire. SDF attacks reportedly affected several neighborhoods, including al-Jamiliya, Bustan al-Basha, al-Midan, al-Suryan, and al-Sabil, with snipers active near the al-Layramoun and al-Shayhan roundabouts in northern Aleppo. One mortar shell reportedly landed near al-Razi hospital. These areas are adjacent to Sheikh Maqsood and al-Ashrafiyah, where SDF forces maintain a strong presence.

According to Syrian state media, SDF units attempted to advance on government security positions, described as a "new violation" of the ceasefire agreement. The clashes also led to the closure of all access routes to Sheikh Maqsood and al-Ashrafiyah. Following the fighting, local authorities raised the readiness of emergency, disaster, health, and social services, advising residents to remain indoors. Aleppo governor, Azzam al-Gharib, temporarily suspended operations on 23 December for all public and private schools, universities, and government offices across the city.

Tensions shortly spread to eastern Syria, where SDF reinforcements were reportedly deployed to the village of Ghanem al-Ali near Syrian army-controlled areas in the Raqqa Governorate's countryside. At the same time, unmanned aerial vehicles were observed over the town of Ma'adan, under government control.

Hostilities subsided around 22:00 local time, as representatives of the Syrian government and SDF entered talks aimed at calming the situation and reaffirming the ceasefire. According to the Syrian Ministry of Defense, the clashes ended after orders were issued by the army's general command to halt strikes on SDF positions to prevent civilian casualties. The SDF stated it ceased its response after receiving calls for de-escalation, noting the decision was intended to restore calm.

The following day, 23 December, the Syrian Observatory for Human Rights reported that the Kurdish neighborhoods remained under siege, with electricity and water cut off, key roads closed, and internet services disrupted. Clashes in December resulted in 1 death and 9 injuries from combatants on both sides, as well as 4 deaths and 34 injuries among civilians.

On 26 December, the head of Internal Security in Aleppo, Mohammed Abdul Ghani, stated that snipers of the SDF opened fire on an Interior Ministry checkpoint near al-Shihan Roundabout in northern Aleppo, resulting in injuries to one member of the Internal Security Forces, who was subsequently taken to hospital for treatment. He said that security units responded to the source of the fire and neutralized it in line with established operational procedures. Abdul Ghani also urged civilians to avoid areas experiencing tension for their own safety and called on them to comply with official instructions. Abdul Ghani held the SDF fully responsible for any escalation or consequences arising from what he described as repeated violations, stressing that continued breaches of ceasefires and attacks on security positions would prompt appropriate measures.

In response, the SDF media center accused what it described as factions linked to the Damascus government of deploying tanks and heavy military vehicles around the al-Ashrafieh neighborhood, calling it an escalation. The center stated that those factions would bear full responsibility for any resulting consequences.

== January 2026 ==
On 6 January 2026, clashes erupted in Aleppo. The Asayish forces targeted a Syrian government vehicle on the Castello Road in northern Aleppo, killing one soldier and injuring four others from the 72nd Division, the SOHR reported.

On 7 January, clashes in Sheikh Maqsood and Ashrafieh intensified, and were described as the harshest day of clashes. Syrian government declared all Asayish military positions in the neighborhoods to be "legitimate targets." At 15:00 p.m. local time a full scale combined arms assault was launched by the Syrian Army on the neighbourhoods. The Syrian Army attempted to enter the areas with armored vehicles, including tanks, but these efforts were repelled by the Asayish. According to the SOHR, fighting that day killed at least one Asayish member and four Syrian Army soldiers.

On 8 January, clashes continued as the Syrian Army was trying to infiltrate the neighbourhoods, artillery shelling struck the Othman Hospital in Sheikh Maqsood, killing 8 civilians and injuring nearly 60 others. Turkish drones reportedly provided support for Syrian Army ground incursions. In the late evening hours, Syrian Army forces, succeeded in partially infiltrating the Ashrafieh neighborhood after fighters from the al-Baggara tribe defected and opened access to the area, as fighting persisted throughout the night.

On 9 January, the Syrian government declared a unilateral ceasefire to take effect at 03:00 local time and offered Kurdish fighters in the neighborhoods the option to evacuate to Kurdish-controlled areas in Northeastern Syria, after having captured the Ashrafieh neighbourhood. The Syrian state news agency SANA reported that Syrian army buses had arrived in Aleppo to evacuate the remaining Asayish fighters from Aleppo. However, the Kurdish councils in the neighborhoods rejected the proposal, describing it as "a call to surrender," and stated that Kurdish forces would instead "defend their neighborhoods." Clashes continued throughout the rest of the day, accompanied by hours-long artillery shelling by government forces going into the night.

On 10 January, pro-government Syrian media declared that Syrian army forces entered parts of Sheikh Maqsood, while fighting persisted. Heavy fighting in Sheikh Maqsood led to five Asayish members carrying out a suicide attack on government forces, killing themselves while also killing and wounding several government fighters, according to the SOHR and Kurdish media.

Later that day, the Syrian Democratic Forces and their affiliates reached a ceasefire agreement with the Syrian transitional government to withdraw their fighters to northeastern Syria. The Syrian government declared a second ceasefire to take effect at 3:00 p.m. local time and outlined a plan for the relocation of Kurdish fighters. France 24 reported that "limited clashes" continued despite the Syrian Army's claims that it had taken control of Sheikh Maqsood, citing local sources. Before midnight, the Kurdish councils of the neighborhoods declared a "partial ceasefire" to allow the evacuation of the wounded and civilians.

Around 60 Asayish fighters surrendered to the Syrian Army and were subsequently sent to North East Syria on buses.

== Aftermath ==
On 11 January, the final batch of Kurdish-led Syrian Democratic Forces (SDF) fighters withdrew from the city of Aleppo. Aleppo Governor Azzam al-Gharib told Al Jazeera early on Sunday that Aleppo had become "empty of SDF fighters" after government forces coordinated their overnight withdrawal on buses out of the city. SDF commander Mazloum Abdi said the group had reached an understanding through international mediation that included a ceasefire and the safe evacuation of civilians and fighters. Reporting from Damascus, Al Jazeera correspondent Ayman Oghanna said that calm had returned to Aleppo and that the United States played an instrumental role in brokering the agreement between the SDF and the Syrian government.

On 13 January, the Syrian Army declared Maskanah and Dayr Hafir in the eastern Aleppo countryside closed military zones. The Syrian Ministry of Defence accused the Syrian Democratic Forces (SDF) of regrouping in the area, alleging that SDF forces had deployed Iranian-made drones to launch attacks on civilians in Aleppo and had destroyed three bridges linking SDF-controlled areas with government-held territory east of the city. The SDF denied the accusations, stating that it had not deployed forces to the Deir Hafer front. According to Al Jazeera, the past 24 hours saw what it described as a “very dangerous escalation,” as government forces redeployed and mobilised troops in eastern rural Aleppo amid tensions with the SDF.

On 13 January 2026, the Syrian transitional government launched an offensive against the SDF in the Kurdish-controlled regions of northeastern Syria. Initially focused on eastern Aleppo Governorate, around the towns of Dayr Hafir and Maskanah, the offensive expanded on 17 January to Raqqa, Deir ez-Zor and Al-Hasakah Governorates.

== Human rights violations and war crimes ==
Greek City Times reported that Syrian government forces issued maps and warnings designating a site in Sheikh Maqsood as a Kurdish military position and announcing that artillery shelling would follow. However, this claim was challenged by Antoine Mekhallale, a senior official of the Greek Melkite Catholic Church in Aleppo, who said in a social media post that the marked buildings were church-owned property housing up to 40 Christian civilian families, not an SDF military site.

During the siege of Sheikh Maqsoud civilians were subject to various human rights violations and war crimes, such as attacks on civilian buildings, denial of food, electricity and water, including the suspension of water-pumping, as well as direct attacks against civilians, among other examples. The shelling of civilian buildings included Khaled hospital, which was also placed under siege after local residents congregated there for safety.

Asayish fighters were also reportedly subject to war-crimes committed by fighters of the Syrian Arab Army, including but not limited to field executions and degradation of prisoners and bodies. A self-filmed video was shared widely online, showing soldiers throwing the body of Asayish member Deniz Çiya from a rooftop, to cries of “Allahu Akbar!” and “It’s a pig, may the curse be on her honor,” with 'pig' being a common slur used towards Kurdish fighters. Another video showed two soldiers dragging a bound, dead Kurdish fighter down a staircase, stating that, “These are the lions of 60th Division,”, referring to the dead fighter again as a "pig".

In a joint statement, several Syrian human rights watchdogs, including the Syria Justice and Accountability Centre and Syrians for Truth and Justice, condemned the attacks on the neighborhoods and warned that the recent military escalation has raised serious concerns among local communities about the risk of new human rights violations.

=== Sanctions ===
Following the clashes in January, multiple US senators began calling for the reintroduction of sanctions on Syria, and called for a strong reaction if fighting resumes. Member of the European Parliament also called for the suspension of European aid to Syria due to the clashes.

== Reactions ==
=== Domestic ===
- Syria: The Syrian Ministry of Interior said that the SDF attacked Internal Security Forces checkpoints despite existing agreements, while the Ministry of Defense rejected allegations that government forces had attacked SDF positions, asserting that the SDF had carried out an assault on army and security checkpoints. The clashes coincided with comments from Syrian Foreign Minister Asaad al-Shaibani during a joint press conference with his Turkish counterpart Hakan Fidan in Damascus. Al-Shaibani stated that the Syrian government had "seen no serious initiative" from the SDF to implement the 10 March agreement, accusing the group of delaying its integration into state institutions. He added that the government had offered a proposal to the SDF to allow flexibility, received their response the previous day, and that the Ministry of Defense was currently reviewing it, warning that any delay by the SDF in integrating with the Syrian army could negatively affect stability in eastern Syria. Later in January 2026, President Ahmed al-Sharaa, in an interview with Shams TV, emphasized that the Syrian government approached the liberation operations responsibly, balancing military objectives with humanitarian concerns. He noted that the events in Aleppo, particularly in Sheikh Maqsoud, aimed to maintain security and stability, safeguard the country’s economic lifelines, and uphold the law following repeated attacks on residential areas and threats to public safety. He affirmed that the operation was successful, carried out with minimal cost, and ensured the safe evacuation of civilians.
- SDF / DAANES: Following mutual accusations over the shelling, the SDF denied claims by the Syrian government and the Ministry of Interior that their units had targeted neighborhoods in Aleppo. The Kurdish-led Autonomous Administration issued a counter-statement accusing Syrian government forces of attacking the Kurdish-majority neighborhoods in Aleppo, claiming that the aim was to undermine efforts toward a comprehensive political solution addressing the aspirations of all Syrians.
- Druze community: Dozens of Druze staged a sit-in protest in Sweida in solidarity with residents of Sheikh Maqsood and Ashrafieh, holding Kurdish and SDF flags.

=== International ===
- United States: President Donald Trump addressed the clashes, saying, "I want to see peace, yes, I do. The Kurds and the Syrian government, we get along with both, as you know very well. They have been natural enemies over the years, but we get along with both."
- Israel: Israeli Foreign Minister Gideon Sa'ar warned that attacks on Kurds in Aleppo are "dangerous and alarming" and that "the international community in general, and the West in particular, has a moral debt toward the Kurds who fought bravely and successfully against ISIS."
- Turkey: During the joint press conference in Damascus, Foreign Minister Hakan Fidan emphasized the importance of integrating the SDF into the Syrian administration in a transparent manner. He warned that any further delays could threaten the unity and stability of Syria's territory. Fidan noted that the SDF appeared unwilling to implement its integration into the Syrian armed forces before the end-of-year deadline, cautioning that Ankara's patience was running thin. He stressed that Turkey hopes to avoid military action, but added that continued procrastination could alter the current situation. Fidan also claimed that some SDF operations were being coordinated with Israel, describing this as a major obstacle to ongoing negotiations with the Syrian government.
- Egypt: The Ministry of Foreign Affairs issued a statement calling for de-escalation, an end to violence, and the protection of civilians, while emphasizing the importance of preserving Syria's security and territorial integrity. The statement expressed deep concern over the rapid escalation of clashes in northern Syria, particularly in Aleppo, and the accompanying acts of violence that endanger civilians and threaten the country's stability. Egypt stressed that a sustainable resolution to the Syrian crisis requires a comprehensive political process based on dialogue, taking into account the interests of all segments of the Syrian population within the framework of the national state and its institutions.
- Kurdistan Region: The influential Kurdish leader of the Kurdistan Democratic Party (KDP), Masoud Barzani, criticized the bombardment of Sheikh Maqsood and Ashrafieh, raising serious concerns about possible ethnic-based targeting of Kurds. Similarly, Bafel Talabani, leader of the Patriotic Union of Kurdistan (PUK), expressed his "deep concerns" over the events in Aleppo.
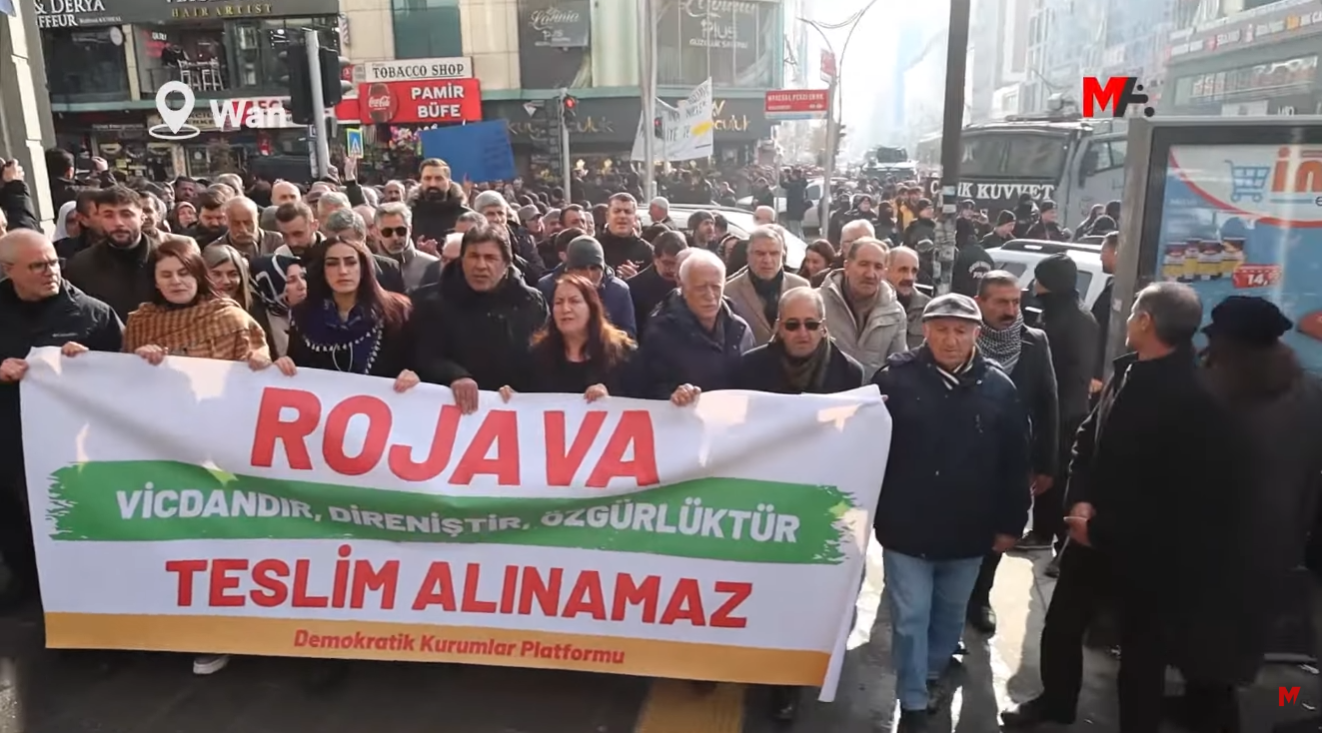
  Kurds in Van, Turkey, protest against the Syrian government and in support of Sheikh Maqsood and Ashrafieh
- Kurds in Turkey: Thousands of anti-Syrian government protesters gathered in Diyarbakır and other Kurdish-majority cities in Turkey to rally against the Syrian government. Banners read "Defending Rojava means defending humanity," while demonstrators chanted slogans such as "Long live the resistance of Rojava," "Long live the resistance of Sheikh Maqsoud," "Women, life, freedom," and "Murderer HTS, collaborator ISIS."
- Kurdish diaspora: Several demonstrations were announced and held by the Kurdish diaspora in Germany, Austria, France, and Greece.
- Holy See: Pope Leo XIV called for peace and dialogue, saying that "persistent tensions are causing the deaths of many people."
- European Union: European Commission President Ursula von der Leyen described the clashes in Aleppo as "worrying" during her visit to Damascus on 9 January 2026.
