= 60th Division (Syria) =

Military unit of the Syrian Army

- Active: 2025 – present
- Country: Syria
- Branch: Syrian Army
- Area of responsibility: Hasakah Governorate; Aleppo Governorate
- Engagements: Aftermath of the Syrian civil war; SDF–Syrian transitional government clashes (2025–2026); Aleppo clashes (2025–2026); 2026 northeastern Syria offensive; 2026 Iran war; Syria in the 2026 Iran war

Commanders
- Current commander: Awad Muhammad al-Jassem

The 60th Division is a military division within the Syrian Army. Established in 2025, the division primarily operates in Aleppo Governorate and Hasakah Governorate. The 60th Division's personnel originates from the Syrian National Army and the Syrian Democratic Forces.

== History ==
=== Composition ===
The 60th Division was formed in Aleppo by members of Ahrar al-Sham and Jaysh al-Islam, two groups affiliated with the Syrian National Army.

According to the consensus reached between Syrian Democratic Forces Commander Mazloum Abdi and Syrian presidential envoy Ziad al-Ayesh, the majority of Syrian Democratic Forces members will be reorganized into three brigades and integrated into the 60th Division, led by Awad Muhammad al-Jassem. In addition, a military brigade from Kobani will also be incorporated into a division in Aleppo Governorate.

=== Clashes with the Syrian Democratic Forces ===
The 60th Division led the Syrian Army's attacks against the Syrian Democratic Forces in Sheikh Maqsood, during the Aleppo clashes and the offensive against the SDF in Deir Hafer, Raqqa and Hasakah.

=== Deployment in Rmeilan base and the 2026 Iran war ===
In February 2026, the 60th Division took control of the Rmeilan base after the base was evacuated by international coalition forces.

The Islamic Resistance in Iraq claimed responsibility for an attack on the Kharab al-Jir base in Hasakah; according to local sources, the drones were launched from Iraqi territory and belonged to pro-Iranian militias, the 60th Division resupplied the Kharab al-Jir base on March 14, 2026.

== Structure ==
The 60th Division is led by Brigade general Awad Muhammad al-Jassem, who is in charge of military operations in the governorates of Hasakah and Aleppo. On March 21, Haji Muhammad Nabu "Jia Kobani" was appointed as deputy commander of the division.
