= Aleppo Revolutionary Council =

Syrian rebel group

- المجلس الثوري لحلب; Majlis Thuwar Halab
- Dates active: 11 November 2014 – ? (currently defunct)
- Headquarters: Aleppo, Syria
- Active regions: Aleppo Governorate, Syria
- Part of: Free Syrian Army
- Wars: Syrian civil war

The Aleppo Revolutionary Council (Arabic: المجلس الثوري لحلب; Majlis Thuwar Halab), also called the Council of Aleppo Rebels, was a rebel group affiliated with the Free Syrian Army active in the Aleppo Governorate. It was established on 11 November 2014 from 14 "revolutionary councils" and some independent groups. The reason for this unification was blamed on "the suffering from division and fragmentation of opinions and efforts in the city of Aleppo". The group rejected UN's envoy Staffan de Mistura proposal for a ceasefire in Aleppo.

In February 2015, the Aleppo Revolutionary Council organized celebrations to mark the 4th anniversary of the 2011 Syrian uprising in the Sheikh Maqsood neighbourhood of Aleppo. The neighbourhood was decorated with Syrian independence flags for the celebrations. From 15 to 18 March 2015, the council organized more celebrations in Sheikh Maqsood and other rebel-controlled neighbourhoods of Aleppo on the Syrian Civil War's 4th anniversary. Participants raised a large number of independence flags and sang slogans which called for the unity of the Syrian people and the overthrow of the Syrian government.

== See also ==
- List of armed groups in the Syrian Civil War
