= 72nd Division (Syria) =

Military unit in Syria

- Active: March 2025 – present
- Country: Syria
- Branch: Syrian Army
- Area of responsibility: Aleppo Governorate
- Engagements: Syrian Civil War; Druze insurgency in Southern Syria (2025–present); Southern Syria clashes (July 2025–present); SDF–Syrian transitional government clashes (2025–2026); Aleppo clashes; 2026 northeastern Syria offensive

Commanders
- Current commander: Colonel Doghan Suleiman

The 72nd Division of the Syrian Army, established in March–April 2025, under the Syrian transitional government, operates in the Aleppo Governorate. The 72nd Division's personnel originates from the pro-Turkish Syrian National Army (SNA).

== History ==
=== Background ===
The establishment of the Division is based on the merger of five pro-Turkish rebel militias: Sultan Murad Division, Sultan Muhammad al-Fateh Division, Liwa al-Waqas, Muntasir Billah Brigade, and 51st Division. These organizations operated in northern Syria under the SNA and received significant Turkish support while cooperating with the Turkish Land Forces in several military operations. Additionally, it is claimed that combatants from these organizations were sent by Turkey to assist Azerbaijan during the Second Nagorno-Karabakh War.

Social media posts suggest that the division continues to recruit new fighters and personnel. However, in early June, several reports indicated that soldiers stationed in the town of Mare' protested after delays in receiving their salaries.

=== Clashes with Druze forces ===
Members of the 72nd Division were among the forces sent to Suwayda during July 2025 due to the clashes with Druze forces.

=== Clashes with SDF forces ===
The 72nd Division was involved in the Aleppo clashes under the Aleppo Operations Authority supervised by Major General Ali Noureddine al-Naasan.

== Structure ==
The 72nd Division is led by Colonel Doghan Suleiman, former head of the Sultan Muhammad al-Fateh Division. Other high-ranking members include: Commander of the special forces Rabia Azizi, 23mm Anti-Aircraft Artillery Officer Abdullah Zaynab, and Equipment and Missions Officer Ghalib Mustafa al-Amr (Abu Muhammad).

The Division controls six subordinate brigades:

- 1st Brigade (led by Omar Abd al-Razzaq (Abu Bashir Mare’), senior commander in the ranks of the Sultan Murad Division)
- 2nd Brigade (led by Doghan Suleiman (Abu Salam) himself, who is of Turkmen origin and said to be close to Turkey)
- 3rd Brigade (led by Abd al-Karim Jamal Qassoum (Abu Jamal), who is said to be close to the Turkish Intelligence service)
- 5th Brigade
- 6th brigade

== See also ==
- Syrian Army
- Syrian civil war
