= Mazloum Abdi =

Syrian politician and former rebel commander (born 1967)

- مظلوم عبدي; Mezlûm Ebdî
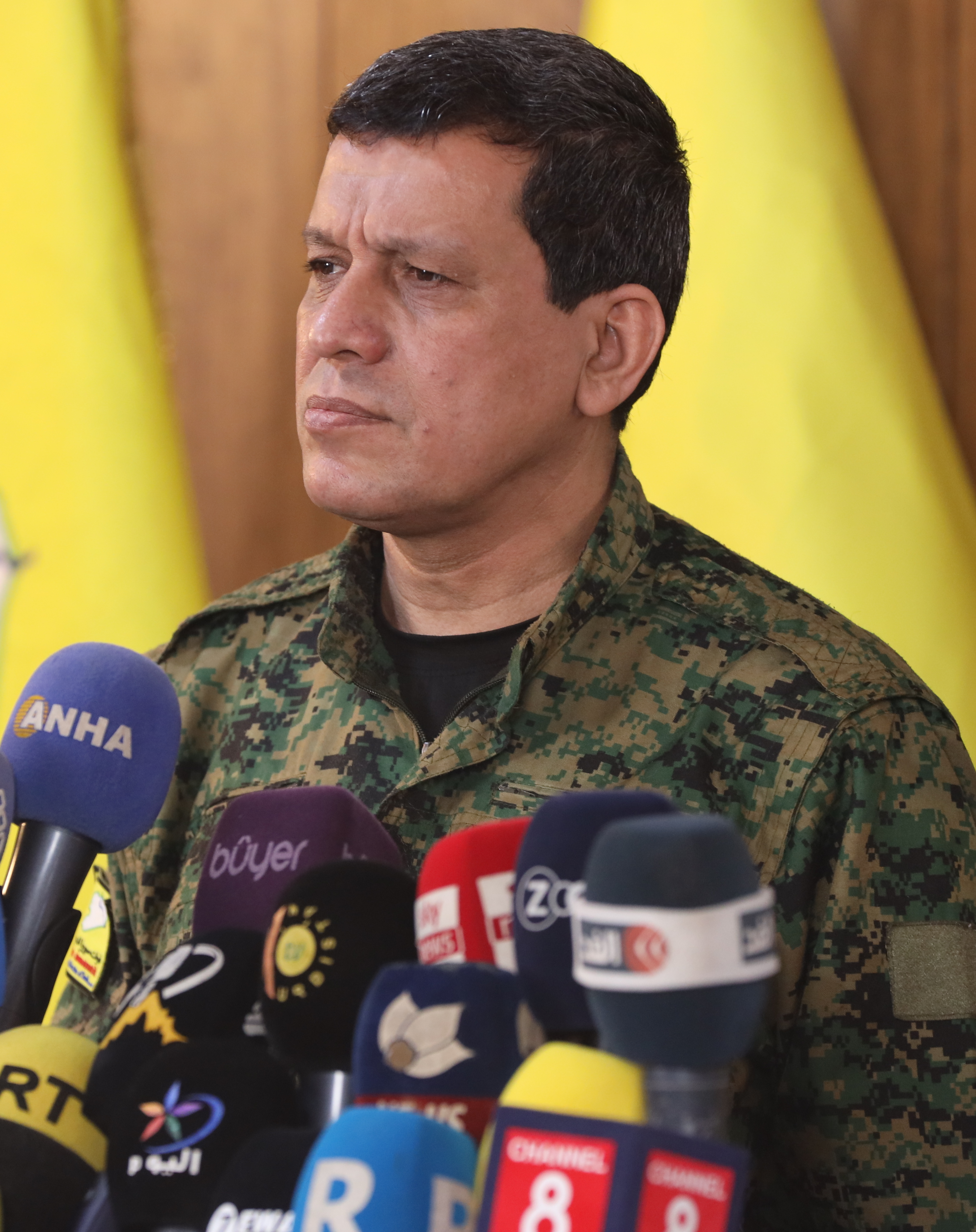
- Abdi in 2025

Adviser to the Presidency of the Republic
- Incumbent
- Assumed office 27 August 2026
- President: Ahmed al-Sharaa
- Preceded by: Position established

Commander-in-Chief of the Syrian Democratic Forces (Note: In Kurmanji, Abdi's rank is fermandarê giştî, which literally translates as 'general commander'. English sources refer to him by multiple ranks, including 'commander-in-chief', 'general', or 'commander'.)
- In office 2015 – 25 August 2026
- Preceded by: Position established
- Succeeded by: Position abolished

Personal details
- Born: Mustafa Khalil Abdi; 1967 (age 58–59) Kobani, Syria
- Citizenship: Iraq (since 2018)
- Party: Independent (since 2026)
- Education: University of Aleppo
- Nickname(s): Noms de guerre: Şahîn Cilo; Mazloum Abdî (Note: Kurdish: Mezlûm Ebdî)

Military service
- Allegiance: Democratic Autonomous Administration of North and East Syria (2012–2026)
- Branch/service: Kurdistan Workers' Party (~1990–2011); People's Defense Forces; Syrian Democratic Forces (2012–2026); People's Defense Units
- Years of service: c. 1990–2026
- Rank: General Commander
- Battles/wars: See list: Kurdish–Turkish conflict; Syrian Civil War; Rojava conflict; Rojava–Islamist conflict; Eastern Syria insurgency; 2019 Turkish offensive into north-eastern Syria; 2024 Syrian opposition offensives; Aftermath of the Syrian civil war; SDF–Syrian transitional government clashes (2025–2026); 2026 northeastern Syria offensive

Mustafa Khalil Abdi (born c. 1967), also known as Mazloum Abdi, (Note: Kurmanji Kurdish: Mezlûm Ebdî; Arabic: مظلوم عبدي, romanized: Maẓlūm ‘Abdī. Also known as Mazlum Kobane or Mazloum Kobani. His previous nom de guerre is Şahin Cilo.) is a Syrian politician and former rebel commander who has served as Adviser to the Presidency of the Republic since 2026. He previously served as commander-in-chief of the Syrian Democratic Forces (SDF) until its dissolution in 2026.

Born to Syrian Kurdish parents from the Kurdish village of Halanj, near Kobani, Abdi was raised by a father who worked as a medical doctor. He studied civil engineering at the University of Aleppo before joining the Kurdistan Workers' Party (PKK) in Syria in 1990. During this period, Syrian authorities imprisoned him on five occasions. While active in the PKK, Abdi developed a close personal relationship with the group's leader, Abdullah Öcalan.

In 1997, he relocated to Europe and remained involved in Kurdish political activities until 2003, when he traveled to Iraq and was reportedly involved in military operations. He later joined the PKK's high command in 2005 and served on the People's Defense Forces (HPG) special operations board between 2009 and 2011. Around 2011–2012, the PKK sent him back to Syria to help organize the activities of the People's Defense Units (YPG) in predominantly Kurdish areas as the Syrian civil war intensified. In 2015, Abdi was chosen by representatives of the United States Army to lead the SDF, following a recommendation from the Kurdistan Regional Government's intelligence service, Parastin u Zanyari.

In March 2025, Abdi's SDF reached an integration agreement with the Syrian caretaker government, led by President Ahmed al-Sharaa, but the process remained inconclusive throughout 2025. In January 2026, following consultations with Iraqi Kurdish leader Masoud Barzani, Abdi announced that SDF forces would withdraw from Dayr Hafir and nearby areas to positions east of the Euphrates. The withdrawal came amid the Syrian transitional government's offensive against the Democratic Autonomous Administration of North and East Syria. In August 2026, Abdi announced the dissolution of the SDF and the full incorporation of its forces into the Syrian Army. He was subsequently appointed as Adviser to the Presidency of the Republic.

== Early life ==
Mustafa Khalil Abdi was born in 1967 to Syrian Kurdish parents in the Kurdish village of Halanj, near Kobani. His father was a medical doctor. He trained as a civil engineer at the University of Aleppo, but did not complete his studies. Abdi joined the Kurdistan Workers' Party (PKK) in Syria in 1990 and was imprisoned five times by the Syrian authorities.

During his time with the PKK in Syria, he became a personal friend of PKK leader Abdullah Öcalan. He moved to Europe in 1997, where he engaged in Kurdish political activities until 2003. That year, he traveled to Iraq, where he was reportedly involved in military operations. In 2004, Abdi traveled to the Iraqi city of Makhmour, where he became a member of the PKK's Executive Council. He served as a member of the PKK high command in 2005. (Note: For alleged terrorism committed in Turkey by the PKK during this period, as of 2019, Interpol has issued a red notice on Turkey's behalf.)

From 2009 to 2011, he was a member of the People's Defense Forces (HPG) special operations board. In 2011/12, he was dispatched to Syria by the PKK to organize the activities of the People's Defense Units (YPG) in Kurdish-populated regions of Syria, amid the escalating Syrian civil war. In August 2014, he was in charge of the negotiations the People's Defense Units (YPG) held in Sulaymaniya with Iran and the United States in order to form an effective alliance against the Islamic State of Iraq and the Levant (ISIL), after which an alliance with the US was agreed to.

Abdi defended Kobani during the Siege of Kobani (Oct. 2014–Jan. 2015), refusing to withdraw despite US recommendations to do so. When his family's house was taken a 3rd time by the Islamic State in house-to-house fights, and given the increased collaboration with USAF, he requested a strike on his home.

=== Name ===
There are different claims about Mazloum Abdi's real name. Some sources in Turkish state media that his name is "Mustafa Abdi bin Halil", and the names he has used over the years include Ferhat Abdi Şahin, Şahin Cilo and Mazlum Abdi. In October 2019, he told The New York Times in an interview that his real name is "Mazlum Abdi". Abdi also uses this name on his official Twitter account. United States President Donald Trump used the phrase "General Mazlum" for him.

Abdi holds Iraqi citizenship from Kirkuk Governorate and possesses an Iraqi passport under the name "Muhammad Khalil Hussein", which he obtained in 2018 without appearing in person in Sulaymaniyah Governorate, Iraqi Kurdistan region. In August 2026, in the presidential decree appointing him as Adviser to the Presidency of the Republic, issued by Syrian President Ahmed al-Sharaa, he was identified as Mustafa Khalil Abdi.

== Commander-in-Chief of the Syrian Democratic Forces (2015–2026) ==
In 2015, he was selected by United States Army representatives to assume command of the Syrian Democratic Forces, on the recommendation of the Kurdistan Regional Government's intelligence service Parastin u Zanyari. In this capacity, Abdi commanded 70,000 troops as of 2019.

Abdi stated that he was open to working with the Assad government within a federal system that included the existing de facto autonomous region of the Democratic Autonomous Administration of North and East Syria. On 29 June 2019, Abdi, as a representative of the SDF, signed the United Nations action plan aimed at preventing the recruitment of child soldiers into armed forces.

After the fall of the Assad regime, in an interview with Rudaw Media Network on 15 August 2026, he attributed Syria's past oppression under Assad and the Ba'ath Party to totalitarian and centralized rule. He argued that centralization had failed and that Syria's future system should instead be decentralized.

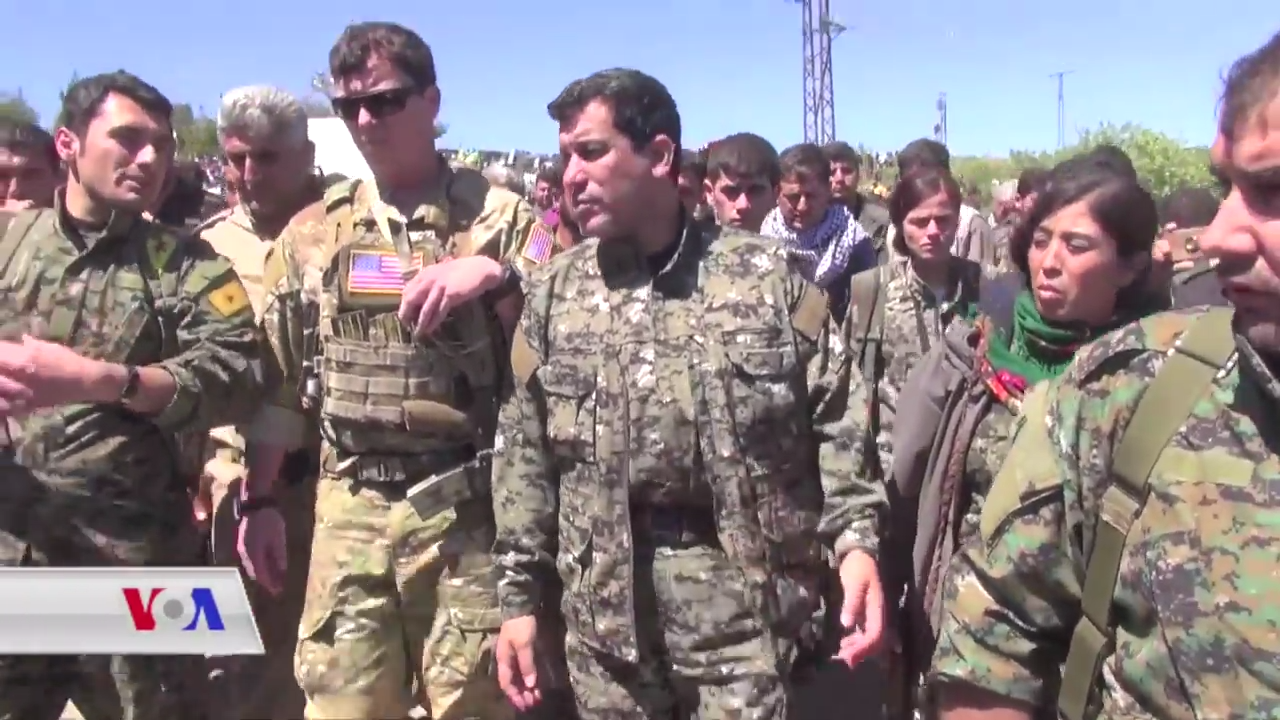
US officers among Mazloum Abdi and YPG members in on 25 April 2017 around al-Hasakah, Northeastern Syria

=== Relationship with Ba'athist Syria during the civil war (2017–2024) ===
On 25 April 2017, the Turkish Armed Forces conducted an air operation against PKK targets in the Sinjar Mountains in Iraq and the Karachok Mountains in northeastern Syria. Abdi was among the teams that included United States Special Operations Command officers who visited and inspected the area where the targets were bombed by Turkish jets in the Karachok Mountain region. On 5 March 2018, the United States Department of Defense spokesman, Colonel Robert Manning, said in a press conference regarding Abdi, "We will continue to support General Mazloum and the Syrian local security forces in the areas liberated from ISIS." In a statement, Turkish Ministry of Foreign Affairs spokesman Hami Aksoy reacted to the Pentagon spokesman's use of the name Mazloum Abdi, who was on Turkey's "most wanted terrorists list", and to his reference to Abdi as a "YPG general" during the press conference. In July 2019, Mazloum Abdi met with the United Nations Special Representative for Children and Armed Conflict, Virginia Gamba, and signed a United Nations document on behalf of the SDF.

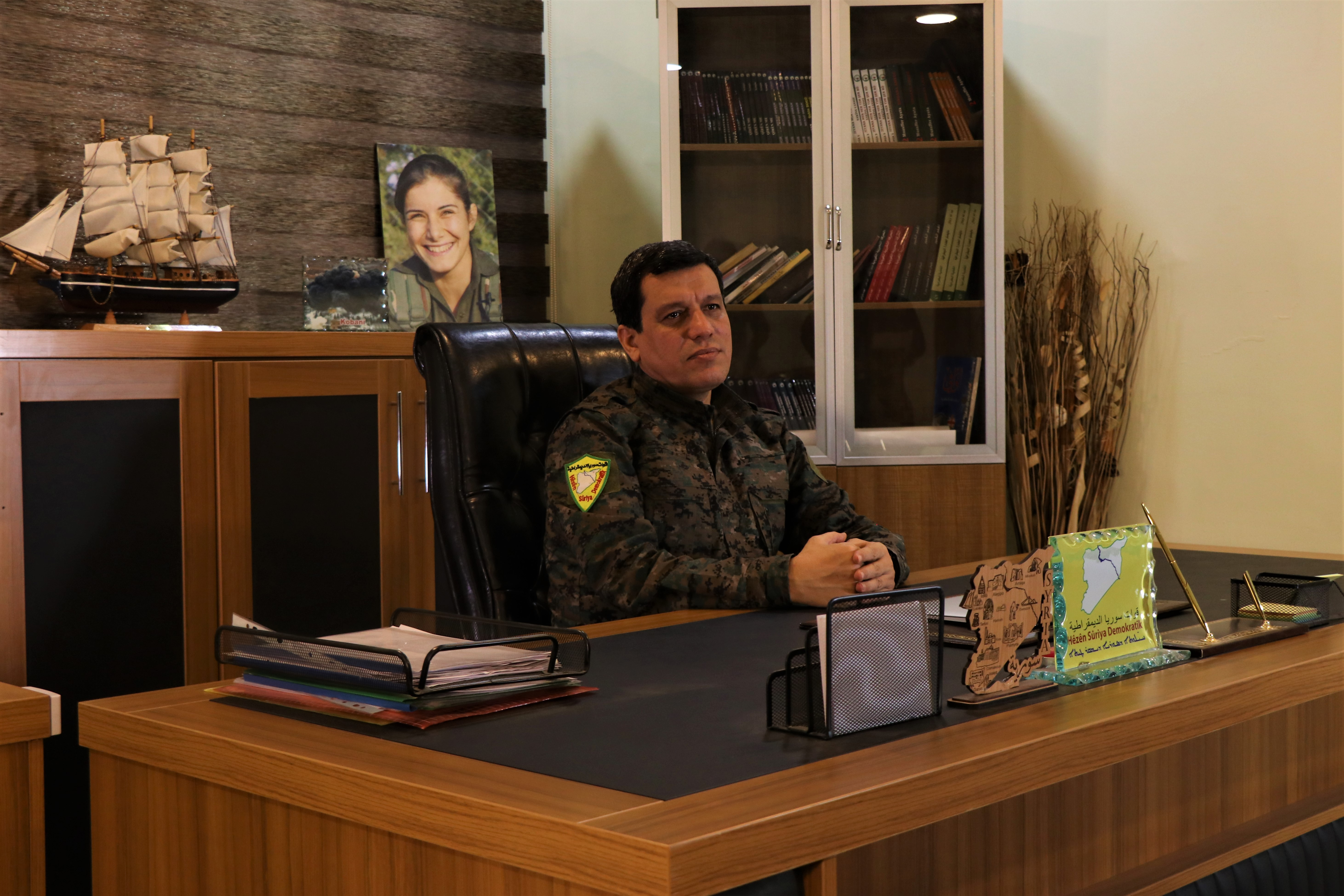
Mazloum Abdi at the Syrian Democratic Forces headquarters

On 9 October 2019, the day Operation Peace Spring began, US President Donald Trump sent a letter to Turkish President Recep Tayyip Erdoğan, attaching the letter Mazloum Abdi sent to Trump. The letter included the following statements: "I have worked hard to resolve some of your problems. Do not disappoint the world. You can make a good deal. General Mazloum Abdi is willing to negotiate with you and is willing to make concessions that they would never make in the past. I am sending you a copy of the letter he wrote to me, which I have just received." He served as the commander-in-chief of the Syrian Democratic Forces during the operation. While the operation was ongoing, US President Donald Trump held meetings with Russian Defense Minister Sergei Shoigu to discuss issues including the ceasefire. Following the Sochi agreement signed between Russia and Turkey, Trump directly included Mazloum Abdi's Twitter account in his message, stating that he had spoken to Mazloum Abdi on the phone, that he was very pleased with this, and thanked Mazloum Abdi.

On 26–27 October 2019, the United States conducted a military operation codenamed Operation Kayla Mueller that resulted in the death of Abu Bakr al-Baghdadi, the then-leader and self-proclaimed caliph of the Islamic State terrorist organization. The operation took place on the outskirts of Barisha, Idlib Governorate, Syria.

Prior to the raid, the SDF, working with the U.S. government, had spent five months gathering intelligence on Baghdadi's location. A senior U.S. State Department official said that the Kurdish-led SDF "played a key role" in the raid on Baghdadi's compound and that the United States was in close communication with SDF commander General Mazloum Abdi about every aspect of their operation, and Abdi's statements about the raid, in reference to the joint intelligence cooperation on the ground, were accurate. Abdi said the operation had been delayed by a month due to Turkey's military build-up at the Syrian border and the Turkish incursion into northeastern Syria that followed.

Mazloum Abdi claimed in an interview with NBC television that the SDF under his command played an active role in the operation in which the leader of the Islamic State of Iraq and Syria, Abu Bakr al-Baghdadi, was killed. In the same interview, Mazloum Abdi said that a spy affiliated with the SDF managed to infiltrate Baghdadi's close circle and obtained information about the plan of the place where the ISIS leader was hiding, the existence of the tunnel and how many people were there. He then stated that the spy managed to obtain a used underwear and blood sample belonging to Baghdadi, that these samples were delivered to the CIA and that the US decided to launch the operation as a result of DNA tests confirming that the person being followed was Baghdadi. In an article by Lara Seligman published in Foreign Policy, it was stated that Mazloum Abdi worked with the US government for a long time to gather intelligence on Baghdadi's whereabouts, that Mazloum Abdi was the only foreigner with information about the target and that the operation in which Baghdadi was killed was postponed for a month due to Operation Peace Spring.

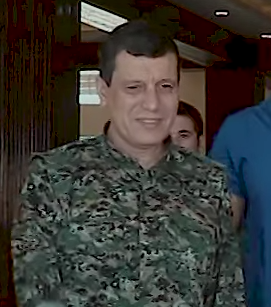
Mazloum Abdi, 2019

On 30 October 2019, the Syrian Ministry of Defense announced that "The SDF General Command, which intends to open the doors of dialogue, should be directly addressed, not our members." Mazloum Abdi stated on his personal Twitter account that the call was made on an individual level, not to the SDF institutionally, and that they rejected their members' individual participation in the Syrian army and wanted the status of the SDF to be preserved.

In the wake of the 2019 Turkish offensive into north-eastern Syria, Abdi has stated his willingness to work with the Syrian regime and Russia and to make compromises with them in order to protect the local population of northeastern Syria from potential "genocide" by "Turkey and its jihadi mercenaries. As part of a deal with the SDF, Syrian government troops have been given permission to enter the cities of Manbij and Kobani in the hopes of deterring further Turkish aggression.

In October 2019, a group of US Senators suggested that the US State Department give Abdi a visa so that he would be able to discuss Syria in the United States. In response, the Turkish Minister of Justice Abdulhamit Gül criticized the US government for treating Abdi as a "legitimate political figure" and indicated that an extradition request had been issued so that if Abdi would enter US territory, he should be detained to be extradited to Turkey.

On 9 October 2019, US president Donald Trump wrote a note to Turkey's president Recep Tayyip Erdoğan, offering to mediate between Turkey and the YPG, saying Abdi was "willing to make concessions that they would never have made in the past" and enclosing a note from Abdi. During Erdoğan's 14 November state visit to the US, he returned the letter to Trump, and claimed Abdi was the adoptive son of the imprisoned PKK leader Abdullah Öcalan.

Mazloum Abdi stated that they consider themselves as "Syrian and a part of Syria", adding that they will agree to work with the Syrian Government. The SDF officially announced their support for the deal on 27 October 2019, five days after the memorandum was made.

==== Frozen conflict (2020–2024) ====
Location in the Syrian civil war, with the Syrian Democratic Forces in the Democratic Autonomous Administration of North and East Syria, controlling northeastern Syria (yellow) prior to the late 2024 offensives

On 28 April 2020, a suicide bomber drove a truck loaded with TNT into a crowd in the city of Afrin and blew himself up. Fifty-three civilians were killed and 50 others were injured. The Turkish government immediately blamed the People's Protection Units (YPG). The Syrian Democratic Council and the commander-in-chief of the Syrian Democratic Forces, Mazloum Abdi, condemned the bombing and blamed Turkish policy, pointing out that "gangs armed by Turkey" had been involved in similar attacks.

As Erdogan's government in Turkey had decided to follow a different strategy in the Middle East in early 2022, Turkish President Erdogan stated that it would be possible to meet with Assad and that there could be no resentment in politics. This led to allegations in the Turkish media that Turkey and the Syrian government could launch a joint operation against the SDF (DAANES), particularly on government-affiliated television channels.

Mazloum Abdi stated in a January 2022 interview that, “We do not accept a return to the past. The Autonomous Administration has existed for ten years, and they must accept it constitutionally. Also, with regard to the military file, by which I mean the SDF and Asayish, the regime must recognize both of them. However, the regime was not yet prepared to take that step. Likewise, a solution would not be reached without international parties putting constant pressure on the Assad regime.”

A terrorist attack occurred on İstiklal Avenue in the Beyoğlu district of Istanbul, Turkey, on 13 November 2022, killing six people and injuring 81 others. No group claimed responsibility for the attack, but Turkish authorities announced that Kurdish separatists were behind it, implicating the Kurdistan Workers' Party (PKK) and the Syrian Democratic Forces (SDF).

On 22 November 2022, Mazloum Abdi claimed that the bomber, Albashir, was related to IS jihadists through her brothers and former husbands, some of whom had been killed in battles against Kurdish forces. At the time, she was living in a Turkey-controlled area in northwestern Syria. Abdi called for peace between Turkey and the Syrian Kurds, excluding any operation against Turkey in Turkey, and denied responsibility for the bombing. He nevertheless vowed to defend Syrian territories under DAANES control. He also deplored Erdogan's electoral strategy, saying that he preferred war and tension over a peace agreement with his forces, which he argued would have been an equally successful electoral strategy.

On 26 November 2022, Mazloum Abdi stated that they had halted operations against the Islamic State group because of Turkish attacks on northern Syria. He also accused Turkish strikes of causing severe damage to the region's infrastructure. Two rockets also targeted U.S.-led coalition forces at bases in the northeastern Syrian town of Ash Shaddadi.

In early July 2024, violent anti-Turkish riots occurred in northern Syria, within areas controlled by Turkey and Turkish-backed Syrian opposition forces. Local protesters and armed militants attacked and set fire to Turkish government buildings and military bases and attacked Turkish civilians in the region. Mazloum Abdi said that, despite their differences, Syrians were united by national honor and independence. Abdi condemned the attacks on Syrians in Kayseri and called for the protection of their lives and dignity. He also welcomed Syrians who rioted to SDF-controlled areas in northern and eastern Syria, extending a hand to help save the country together.

At the end of 2024, Abdi warned that the SDF would not have sufficient capacity to continue administering the high-security prison in al-Hasakah, which, according to Abdi, housed approximately 12,000 Islamic State fighters at the time, if Turkey continued to attack the autonomous administration of northern and eastern Syria, which the SDF defended, and if the United States reduced its support for the SDF following the second inauguration of Donald Trump. Abdi accused Turkish president Recep Tayyip Erdoğan of seeking to destroy the autonomous administration and expel the Syrian Kurds from the northern border region in order to settle Arabs there.

==== Fall of the Assad regime (2024) ====
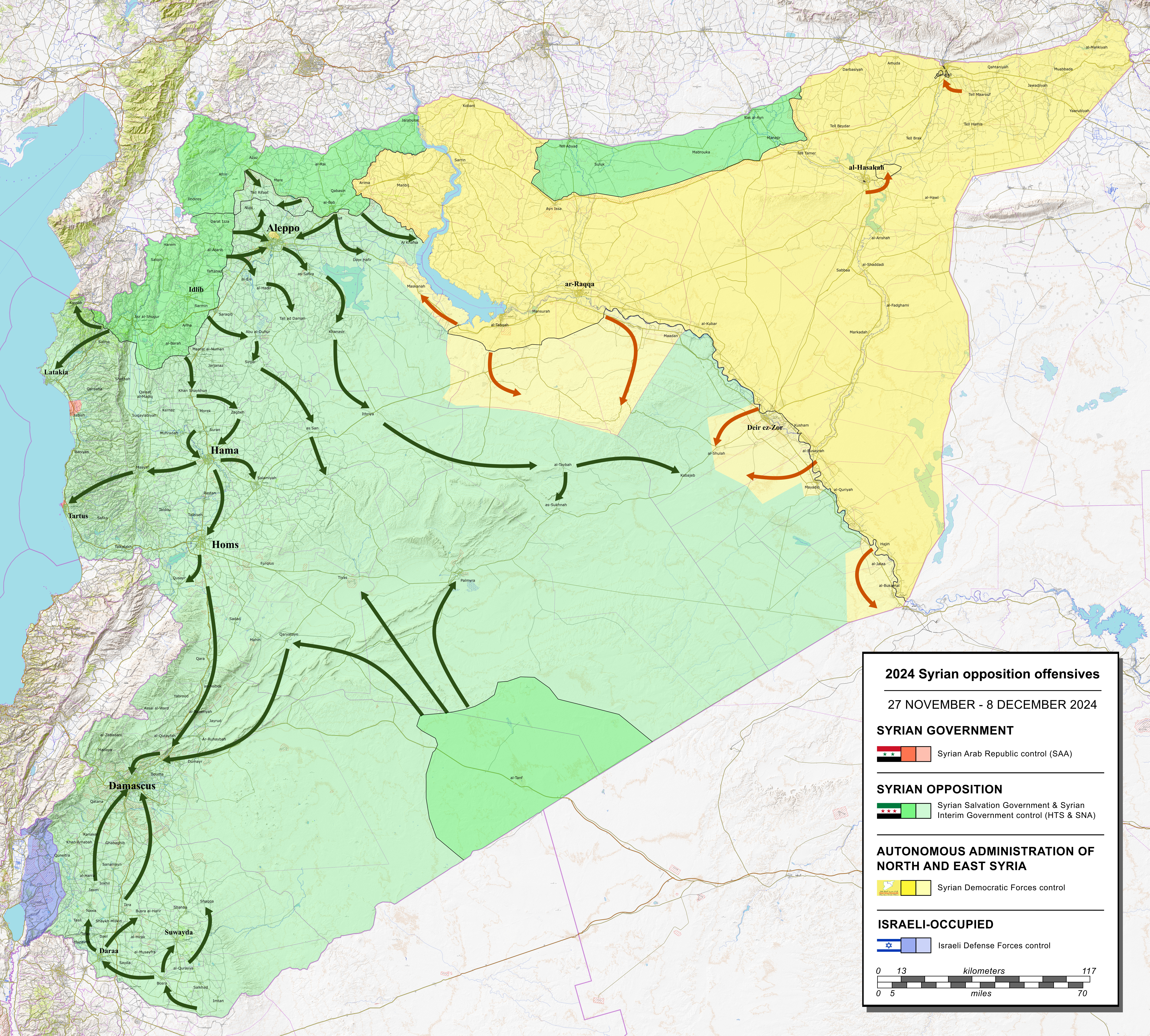
Map of the 2024 Syrian opposition offensives

During the fall of the Assad regime the Turkish-backed Syrian National Army (SNA) captured Tell Rifaat and announced a military campaign targeting Manbij, a strategic city in the eastern Aleppo countryside. On 2 December 2024, the SDF announced plans to evacuate Kurdish IDPs from Tel Rifaat and the Shahba region to SDF-held areas in Aleppo's Sheikh Maqsood district and northeastern Syria. Mazloum Abdi commented: “Our efforts are continuing to secure a safe exit for the residents of Tal Rifaat and al-Shahba.” This offensive held particular significance as Manbij represented the final Syrian Democratic Forces (SDF)-controlled territory west of the Euphrates River, where the group maintained its presence with US military support. The opposition's military operations occurred as part of Operation Dawn of Freedom simultaneously with Operation Deterrence of Aggression, which advanced from Idlib toward Homs.

The Dawn of Freedom operations room, a component of the SNA, articulated that while their primary objective remained the removal of the Assad government, they were compelled to engage the SDF due to what they characterized as attacks on opposition-held villages in the Aleppo countryside. The operations room issued civilian safety advisories for Manbij residents, requesting they maintain distance from military installations.

On 9 December, the Turkish state-run Anadolu Agency claimed that the city was captured by the SNA. The Mazloum Abdi denied this, stating it as "psychological warfare" and "propaganda". The SOHR stated that SNA had captured most of the city, claiming withdrawal of the Manbij Military Council, except for positions in the rear of Manbij. It was also reported that after holding talks, the United States and Turkey reached an agreement which resulted in the SDF withdrawing from Manbij.

Following the SNA capture of Manbij city on 11 December, a temporary ceasefire agreement in the region was reached between the SNA and SDF through U.S. mediation. However, military activities did not cease, which eventually resulted in fighting in the Kobani countryside. In addition, the SNA refused the evacuation of SDF members or civilians from Manbij, executed captured SDF members and attempted offensive operations against the SDF, resulting in fighting near the Tishrin Dam. The following week, the SNA stated that they ended the US-brokered ceasefire with the SDF. Turkey stated that the ceasefire did not exist.

The offensive came around the same time in which several Syrian rebel factions agreed with de facto leader Ahmed al-Sharaa to dissolve their groups and to fall under the country's new Ministry of Defense. Mazloum Abdi did not participate in this meeting in Damascus.

=== Relations with the post-Assad Syrian government (2024–2026) ===
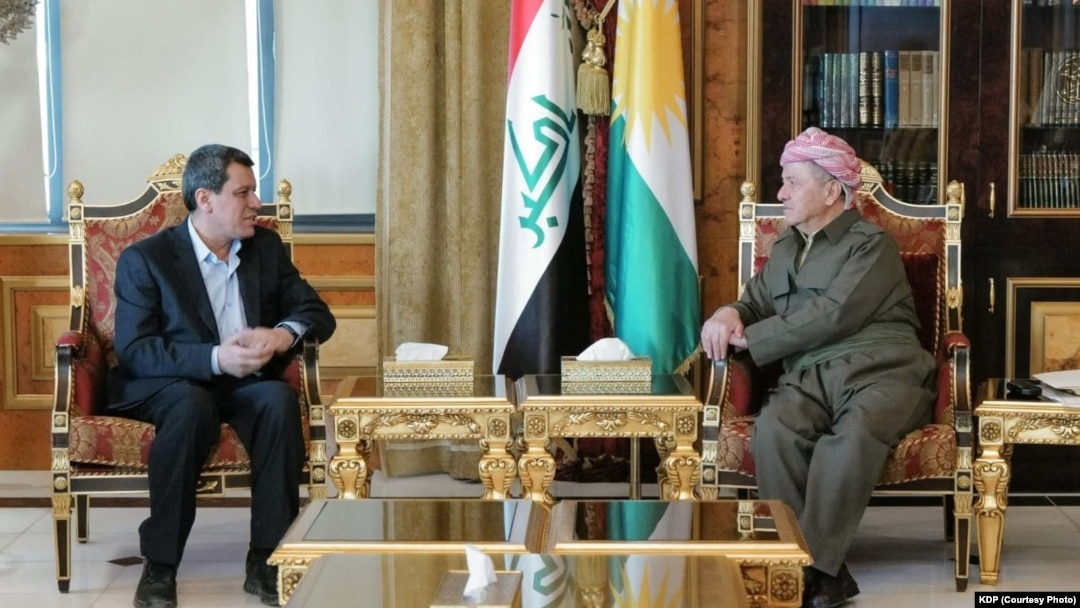
The meeting between Mazloum Abdi and Masoud Barzani, 16 January 2025

In January 2025, talks started between the new HTS-led Syrian government and the SDF in Damascus. The focus of the negotiations was to settle the Kurdish forces into the new administration and to resolve the conflict with the SNA. SDF commander Mazloum Abdi has said that one of his central demands is a decentralised administration, in which he proposed to integrate the SDF with the new Defence Ministry, but as "a military bloc" without dissolving the group. This proposal was rejected by Syria's new defence minister Murhaf Abu Qasra stating that such a bloc "is not right." Abu Qasra expressed his desire to finish the integration process by 1 March. At the same time, he did not rule out the use of force should the negotiations fail.

He met with the chairman of the Kurdistan Democratic Party, Masoud Barzani, in Erbil on 16 January 2025. The meeting drew widespread attention among Kurdish communities and prompted public celebrations in several areas, as it was perceived as a new opportunity for Kurdish unity. Furthermore, the meeting was described as “historic” and “a national demand that delighted every Kurd,” according to Sinam Mohamad, the Syrian Democratic Council's (SDC) representative to the United States.

On 29 January, Ahmed al-Sharaa was appointed as the Syrian president. The spokesperson of Syria's military operations, Hassan Abdul Ghani, announced on state media the dissolution of all armed factions in the country, which includes the SNA and al-Sharaa's own HTS. In his first interview as president, al-Sharaa told reporters of The Economist that he opposes a federal system in Syria. Moreover, al-Sharaa said that Turkey was planning to launch a full-fledged operation in the north against the Kurdish forces, but he asked them to wait in order to give space for negotiations to reach an agreement with Mazloum Abdi.

10 March agreement

Agreement stipulating the integration of the Syrian Democratic Forces (SDF) into the institutions of the Syrian Arab Republic, 10 March 2025.

After several failed negotiations, Abdi met with Syrian president Ahmed al-Sharaa on 10 March 2025. Mazloum announced the SDF agreed to integrate into state institutions. Ahmed al-Sharaa declared: "We are committed to building a better future that guarantees the rights of all Syrians and fulfils their aspirations for peace and dignity," he wrote on X after signing the deal in Damascus on Monday alongside President Ahmed al-Sharaa. Turkish president Recep Tayyip Erdoğan tolerates this agreement and clearly states in his statement that airports, oil fields and border crossings should come under the control of the government in Damascus, thus destroying the original demand of Mazloum Abdi and the Kurdish parties for autonomy in the country. Erdogan further added in televised comments: "We attach great importance to the territorial integrity of our neighbour Syria, the preservation of its unitary structure, and the strengthening of its unity and stability." Before Erdoğan's statement, a Turkish official said that the Turkish Government was "cautiously optimistic" about the deal but focused on its implementation. This agreement was viewed with controversy, as the same week factions of the Syrian Armed Forces carried out mass killings in the Alawite region in the west of the country.

This led many to believe that with such an agreement, al-Sharaa can achieve a positive image in the Western world after these events, and is less intended to benefit the Kurds in Syria. Mazloum Abdi condemned the violence against the Alawites, with calling on Ahmad al-Sharaa to hold the perpetrators of the massacres accountable, and to stop the violence. Abdi stated extremist groups were attempting to "create sectarian conflicts and settle internal scores" across Syria. The deadline for the merger has been set for the end of 2025. However, under the conditions it is known that there will be joint operations between the SDF and Damascus government forces against remnants and sleeper cells of ISIS in the Syrian desert. Al-Sharaa promised to go after war criminals belonging to the former regime. On 29 March, Abdi said it will not adhere to the decisions of the new transitional government, alleging that its composition allowed a single faction to maintain control and did not represent the diversity of Syria.

==== Syrian Constitutional Declaration ====
In an interview with Rudaw Media Network on 15 August, Abdi said the constitutional declaration had already been drafted before the March 10 agreement was signed, and that they did not have the opportunity to incorporate the provisions they had agreed upon into the constitution. He said that if a new constitution is drafted, it should incorporate these agreements, particularly provisions concerning Kurdish rights and the Kurdish language. Abdi also stressed the need for political unity among Kurds to preserve these gains and ensure their inclusion in the Syrian constitution.

==== Negotiations with the Syrian government ====
In an 16 October interview with the Associated Press, Mazloum Abdi said that both sides had agreed on a "mechanism" allowing the SDF to join the Syrian army as cohesive units rather than as individual soldiers. He also adding that the forces would be incorporated “according to the rules of the Defense Ministry.” In December 2025, Turkish Foreign Minister Hakan Fidan urged the SDF to integrate into the Syrian army and stop obstructing Syria's stability as clashes erupted in Aleppo.

In the meantime, Damascus's written proposal included reorganising the SDF into three divisions and several brigades, including a women's unit, as part of the integration plan. On 4 January 2026, Abdi held talks in Damascus with Syrian government officials on integrating the SDF into the national army, as part of a previously agreed merger plan. However, the meeting ended without “tangible results” after disagreements persisted over how the integration should proceed, with both sides agreeing to continue discussions at a later date.

==== Northeastern Syria offensive and aftermath ====
Syrian president Ahmed al-Sharaa announced the 14-point agreement on the ceasefire and the integration of the Syrian Democratic Forces (SDF), which was signed by Abdi, 18 January 2026 (Note: Abdi put an electronic signature to the deal.)

On 16 January 2026, after consulting the Iraqi Kurdish leader Masoud Barzani, Abdi announced the withdrawal of SDF forces from Dayr Hafir and its surrounding areas to positions east of the Euphrates in the face of the Syrian transitional government's offensive against the Democratic Autonomous Administration of North and East Syria. The following day, he arrived in Erbil, accompanied by U.S. envoy Tom Barrack, to meet with Masoud Barzani. On 18 January, he agreed to a ceasefire to end the government's offensive during a telephone call with President al-Sharaa. The ceasefire was later formalized in an integration agreement announced on 30 January, calling for the withdrawal of SDF and government forces from frontline areas, retention of Kurdish security forces in cities, limited Damascus security presence for integration tasks, continuation of SDF brigades near cities, maintenance of civilian institutions with staff integrated into ministries, the return of displaced people, and coordination on releasing prisoners.

During the 62nd Munich Security Conference, he held talks with French President Emmanuel Macron, and met with U.S. Secretary of State Marco Rubio, alongside Syrian Foreign Minister Asaad al-Shaibani. He later held a meeting with a delegation of U.S. Senators, including Lindsey Graham, Sheldon Whitehouse, Jacky Rosen, Peter Welch, and Andy Kim. A few months later, on 16 April, Abdi and Îlham Ehmed met with President Ahmad al-Sharaa in Damascus, alongside Foreign Minister Asaad al-Shaibani, to discuss implementation of the January agreement and the integration of the Syrian Democratic Forces into state institutions. In the second half of June 2026, Abdi embarked on a European tour including France and Italy, an action that drew reservations from the transitional government given its occurrence without prior consultation.

==== Integration into the Syrian State and Dissolution of the Syrian Democratic Forces ====
On 20 August, during the centenary celebrations of the city of Qamishli, Mazloum Abdi declared that the integration of the military, security, and administrative institutions into the Syrian state had been completed and that non-Syrian fighters affiliated with the SDF had withdrawn. However, other media reported that Abdi stopped short of announcing the SDF's dissolution and that issues such as the integration of the Women's Protection Units remained unresolved.

On 25 August, Abdi, alongside YPJ commander Newroz Ahmed and co-president of the DAANES Executive Council, Îlham Ehmed, travelled to Damascus for a day of discussions, following which Abdi gave a press conference in which he declared the integration of the SDF into the Syrian state and its formal dissolution.

== Adviser to the Presidency of the Republic (2026–present) ==
=== Appointment ===
On 27 August 2026, Syrian President Ahmed al-Sharaa issued a decree appointing Abdi as an adviser to the Presidency of the Republic. Reuters reported that it remained unclear whether the role would be purely ceremonial.

Following his appointment as an adviser, the Turkish Interior Ministry removed Abdi from its list of wanted terrorists, while the appointment drew criticism from some Kurds online and parts of the Rojava population, viewing it as a concession that could undermine Kurdish demands for a decentralized Syria.

Cemîl Bayik, a military commander of the Kurdistan Workers' Party (PKK), criticized Mazloum Abdi's appointment as Syrian presidential adviser, arguing that Abdi should have remained "among his people" and maintained his previous position of rejecting official posts in the Syrian state, while stressing that Kurdish-majority areas in Syria should have autonomy. In an interview with The Amargi as an adviser, Abdi said his main goal was to serve the Kurdish people, strengthen Kurdish unity, and advance Kurdish rights within the Syrian state. He said he accepted the position to continue working on the Kurdish issue in Damascus.

=== Tenure as Presidential Adviser ===
In a separate interview with Turkish channel İlke TV, Abdi said that a preparatory committee was expected to be formed within the next two or three months to draft the constitution, emphasizing the need for Kurdish representatives to participate in the process. On 10 September, Abdi met with Ziad al-Ayesh, the Presidential Envoy tasked with implementing the January 2026 Agreement and governor of Deir ez-Zor, alongside Hasakah Governor Noureddin Issa Ahmed. They discussed the implementation of the Agreement, coordination among relevant parties, and the status of service institutions in Hasakah Governorate.

On 12 September, Abdi and his delegation visited injured people being treated at Kobani Hospital following a riot and fire at Kobani Prison that left nine people dead and 17 others injured. On 14 September, Abdi met with Kobani District Director Ibrahim Muslim to review the incident and discuss measures to prevent similar events in the future. The following day, Abdi and Kobani Brigade commander Mahmoud Berkhadan met with Kurdish political party leaders in Kobani to discuss the region’s administrative and security integration. Abdi said the Syrian government was paying attention to the Kurdish issue and respecting the distinct character of Kurdish areas. He also said integration committees were working with relevant ministries to finalize provisions for education in the Kurdish mother tongue.

== See also ==
- Battle of Raqqa
- Ferhad Şamî
