= 66th Division (Syria) =

- Active: March 2025 - present
- Country: Syria
- Branch: Syrian Army
- Area of responsibility: Deir ez-Zor
- Engagements: SDF–Syrian transitional government clashes (2025–2026)

Commanders
- Current commander: Ahmad al-Muhmad

The 66th Division of the Syrian Army, established between March and April 2025, under the Syrian Transitional Government, is responsible for the eastern border region of Syria, which includes Al-Bukamal, and Deir ez-Zor, covering a sector of more than 250 kilometers. Most of the division's personnel are former members of the Liberation and Construction Movement and the Zubair bin al-Awam Brigade of Hay'at Tahrir al-Sham (HTS), a Sunni Islamist paramilitary group.

The division is tasked with securing and monitoring Syria’s eastern border areas, maintaining control over key crossings and transport routes.

== History ==
The deployment of the division to the eastern Syria area began in mid-April, but it appeared to be incomplete due to an ongoing shortage of personnel.

The division engaged in sporadic fighting with SDF forces along the Euphrates contact line in 2025.

== Structure ==
Many of the division’s officials reportedly originate from eastern Syrian provinces, and at least some of its personnel previously served in the Zubair bin al-Awam Brigade of HTS. The division is commanded by Ahmad al-Muhmad (Abu Muhammad Shuri), originally from Tabqa in the Raqqa region. Before his appointment, he was a member of the HTS Shura Council and commander of the Zubair bin al-Awam Brigade.

Other high ranking members of the division include: Chief of Staff Alaa Ahmad (Abu Ahmad al-Shami), and Northern Sector Commander Muhammad Hasan al-Shawwakh (Abu Jihad Qadisiyya).

The division controls at least four subordinate brigades:

- Brigade (name/number unknown)
- Raqqa Brigade (led by Mahmoud al-Hajj Abd Abu Muhammad)
- Special Forces Brigade (led by Ahmad al-Aboud)
- Zubair bin al-Awam Brigade (led by Abu Khaled al-Arabi, who is considered close to Turkey)
