= BMC Amazon =

Turkish armored vehicle

- Type: Mine-resistant ambush protected vehicle
- Place of origin: Turkey

Service history
- Used by: See operators
- Wars: SDF-Syrian transitional government clashes (2025-present)

Production history
- Designer: BMC Otomotiv
- Manufacturer: BMC Otomotiv

Specifications
- Height: 400mm
- Passengers: 7
- Maximum speed: 120km/h

The BMC Amazon is a mine-resistant ambush protected vehicle (MRAP) manufactured and designed by BMC Otomotiv for use in the Turkish Armed Forces, though it has also seen usage in neighboring and regional countries as well.

== Design ==
The BMC Amazon base model uses a unibody design with a V-shaped hull for its underbody, and is equipped with an automatic fire extinguisher system, run-flat tires, rear-view cameras, alongside dimming and camouflage lighting features. The base model BMC Amazon also has a capacity of seven passengers, and according to BMC, 'meets STANAG 4569 protection levels', though a specific description was not stated.

== Variants ==
=== BMC Amazon Ottonom (4x4) ===
The Ottonom variant of the BMC Amazon, in addition to features already included in the base model, is also capable of maneuvering through rough terrain alongside being equipped with a drone.

=== BMC Amazon 4x4 RCS ===
The BMC Amazon RCS is a remote-controllable variant of the BMC Amazon, specifically used for 'residential and asymmetric battlefields'.

== Operators ==
=== State users ===
- Syria - operated by various branches of the Syrian Armed Forces under the command of the Syrian transitional government. First seen in use in large quantities during clashes with the Syrian Democratic Forces.
- Turkey - In use with Turkish Land Forces and Police Special Operations Department.
- Turkmenistan - Variants equipped with Aselsan Dual SARP remote controlled weapon station were spotted in use with the State Border Service of Turkmenistan in 2018.
- Qatar - 35 units purchased in 2018 for Qatari Emiri Land Force.

=== Non-state users ===
- Northern Cyprus - Donated by Turkey in 2023, operated by local Police Special Operations teams.
