= Sipan Hamo =

Syrian military officer

- Sîpan Hemo
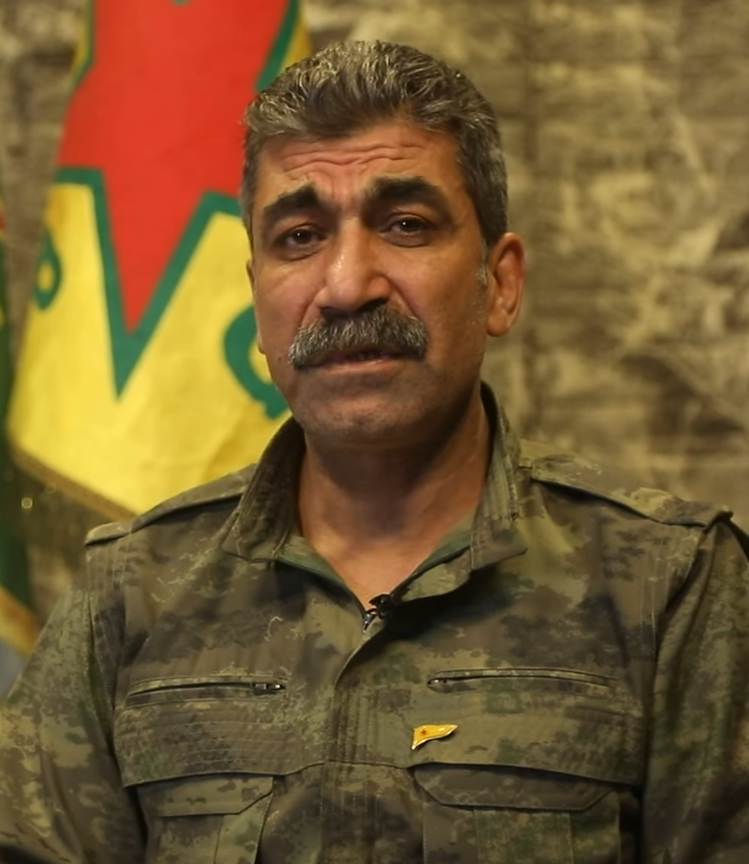
- Hamo in 2025

Deputy Minister of Defence for the Eastern Region
- Incumbent
- Assumed office 10 March 2026
- President: Ahmed al-Sharaa
- Minister: Murhaf Abu Qasra

Personal details
- Born: 1973 (age 52–53) Afrin, Syria
- Known for: High-ranking commander of the Syrian Democratic Forces

Military service
- Allegiance: Syria (since 2026); Autonomous Administration of North and East Syria (2013–2026); Democratic Union Party
- Branch/service: Kurdistan Workers' Party (1994–2011); Syrian Democratic Forces (2012–2026); People's Defense Units; Ministry of Defense (2026–present)
- Battles/wars: Syrian Civil War; Battle of Ras al-Ayn (2012–13); Siege of Kobanî; Battle of Raqqa (2017); Operation Olive Branch; War in Iraq (2013–2017); Northern Iraq offensive (August 2014)

Sipan Hamo (Kurdish: Sîpan Hemo, né Samir Aso) is a Syrian military officer serving as the Deputy Minister of Defense for the Eastern Region since March 2026. He was the general commander of the People's Defense Units, and a member of the general command of the Syrian Democratic Forces.

== Early life ==
Hamo was born in the Syrian city of Afrin to a Kurdish family, born Samir Ali Aso. He began his political and military trajectory in 1994 when he joined the Kurdistan Workers’ Party (PKK). He spent his formative years in the PKK’s military structure, receiving training in the group’s camps in the Qandil Mountains of northern Iraq. During this period, he used several noms de guerre, including "Darwish Afrin" and "Swar", before adopting the name Sipan Hamo.

== Career ==
=== Commander-in-chief of the YPG ===
With the outbreak of the Syrian revolution in 2011, Hamo returned to Syria and became one of the principal founders of the People’s Defense Units (YPG). He rose to the position of commander-in-chief, overseeing the group’s evolution from a localized militia into a disciplined and effective fighting force.

In October 2017, he travelled to Russia to meet with Russian Defense Minister Sergei Shoigu and Chief-of-Staff Valery Gerasimov over the future of Deir ez-Zour and Raqqa. Hamo was the highest SDF officer to travel to Russia since the beginning of the Syrian civil war. In February 2018, Hamo commented on Russia's lack of intervention in response to Turkey's Operation Olive Branch entering SDF-held Afrin canton, stating that Russia was making a strategic mistake.

A photo of Hamo was first published in August 2025 by the pro-Kurdish Turkish media outlet Nûmedya24 which conducted the first publicized interview with Hamo.

In an extensive interview with the SDF Media Center on 18 October 2025, Hamo stated that the upcoming steps taken by the Damascus government would be the decisive factor in determining the fate of the integration process — "whether it accelerates, slows down, or perhaps freezes entirely".

=== Deputy Defense Minister for the Eastern Region ===
On 10 March 2026, the Syrian Defense Ministry announced that Hamo was appointed Deputy Defense Minister for the Eastern Region.

During the Iran war, after pro-Iran Iraqi militias attacked the Kharab al-Jir base in Hasakah, he stated on X, formerly Twitter, that the attack caused "material damage but no casualties among the armed forces", and called on Iraq "to take firm and decisive measures to prevent a recurrence of such violations".

== See also ==
- Mazloum Abdi
- Nuri Mahmoud
