= Ashrafiyah, Aleppo =

Ashrafiyah الأشرفية
- Neighborhood
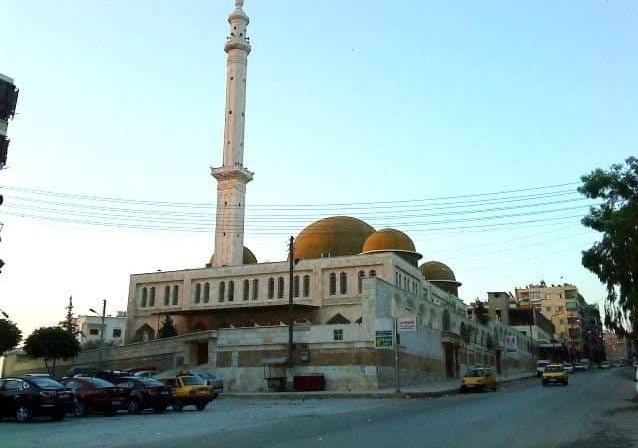
- Mosque in Ashrafiyah
- Interactive map of Ashrafiyah
- Location in Syria
- Coordinates: 36°13′40″N 37°8′35″E
- Country: Syria
- Governorate: Aleppo
- Subdistrict: Jabal Samaan
- City: Aleppo

Population (2025)
  - Total: 400,000
- Population includes adjacent neighborhood of Sheikh Maqsoud

Ashrafiyah (Arabic: الأشرفية) also spelled Ashrafieh, is a neighborhood in northeastern Aleppo in northern Syria. In 2025, it had an estimated population of 400,000 (including the bordering neighborhood of Sheikh Maqsoud). Bordering Ashrafiyah are Sheikh Maqsoud from the northeast, Bani Zaid from the northwest, Al Zuhour, As Sabil, and As Siryan from the south.

== History ==
=== Fall of the Assad regime ===
Following the fall of the Assad Regime in 2024 and the Second Battle of Aleppo, most of Aleppo came under the control of the Syrian Transitional Government. However, the neighbourhoods of Ashrafieh and Sheikh Maqsoud remained under the control of the Syrian Democratic Forces. Kurdish control over Ashrafieh was later formalized through agreements between the SDF and Syrian transitional government in December 2024 and April 2025. These deals specified that only the SDF-affiliated Asayish would remain in Ashrafieh.

=== SDF–STG conflict ===
On 8 January 2026, the Syrian Army captured the majority of the Ashrafieh neighborhood after three days of fighting. By 10 January the SDF had completely withdrawn from Aleppo, including Ashrafieh.

== Demographics ==
Ashrafiyah has a diverse demographic makeup, with Kurds and Arabs making up the majority and smaller communities of Syriacs, Armenians, and Mardellis. The religious makeup includes Muslims, Christians, and Yazidis.
