= Symbols of the Democratic Autonomous Administration of North and East Syria =

Symbols of NES

Emblem of the Democratic Autonomous Administration of North and East Syria
- Armiger: Democratic Autonomous Administration of North and East Syria
- Adopted: 2018
- Relinquished: 2026
- Motto: Arabic: الإدارة الذاتية الديمقراطية لإقليم شمال وشرق سوريا; Kurdish: Rêveberiya Xweseriya Demokratîk a Herêma Bakur û Rojhilatê Sûriyê; Classical Syriac: ܡܕܒܪܢܘܬ݂ܳܐ ܝܬ݂ܝܬܳܐ ܕܝܡܩܪܐܛܝܬܳܐ ܠܩܠܝܡܳܐ ܕܓܪܒܝܳܐ ܘ ܡܕܢܚܳܐ ܕܣܘܪܝܰܐ; Turkish: Kuzey ve Doğu Suriye Demokratik Özerk Yönetimi Bölgesi (Democratic Autonomous Administration of North and East Syria)

A number of different symbols were used to represent the Democratic Autonomous Administration of North and East Syria (DAANES), commonly known as Rojava, during its existence from 2012 until its integration into the Syrian state in 2026.

The administration adopted an official emblem in December 2018. The emblem consists of the words "Autonomous Administration" in Arabic, surrounded by seven red stars representing the regions of northeast Syria, as well as a branch of olives and spike of wheat, two crops grown in the region. Surrounding all of the symbols is the words "Democratic Autonomous Administration of North and East Syria" written in Arabic, Kurmanji, Syriac, and Turkish, the languages spoken in the region. The blue and yellow semicircles the whole emblem is put upon represents the Euphrates river and the "permanent spring" of the region. A flag with the DAANES emblem on a white field is also used occasionally to represent the administration itself.

One of the most commonly used flags, especially in Kurdish-majority areas, is the tricolor flag that was adopted by the Movement for a Democratic Society (TEV-DEM), a prominent democratic confederalist organization in the region. The green, yellow and red colors are traditionally associated with Kurdish people, for example in the modern Flag of Kurdistan. A horizontal tricolor with blue, yellow, and red is used by the Syriac Union Party and its military wing in areas with a significant Syriac-Assyrian presence.

DAANES used the civil and state flag of Syria from 12 December 2024 until 20 August 2026, following the fall of the Assad regime.

== Official symbols ==
Flag used by DAANES authorities since 2018, consisting of the administration's emblem superimposed on a plain white background.

Official emblem of DAANES since 2018.

Flag of TEV-DEM used by Rojava around 2012.

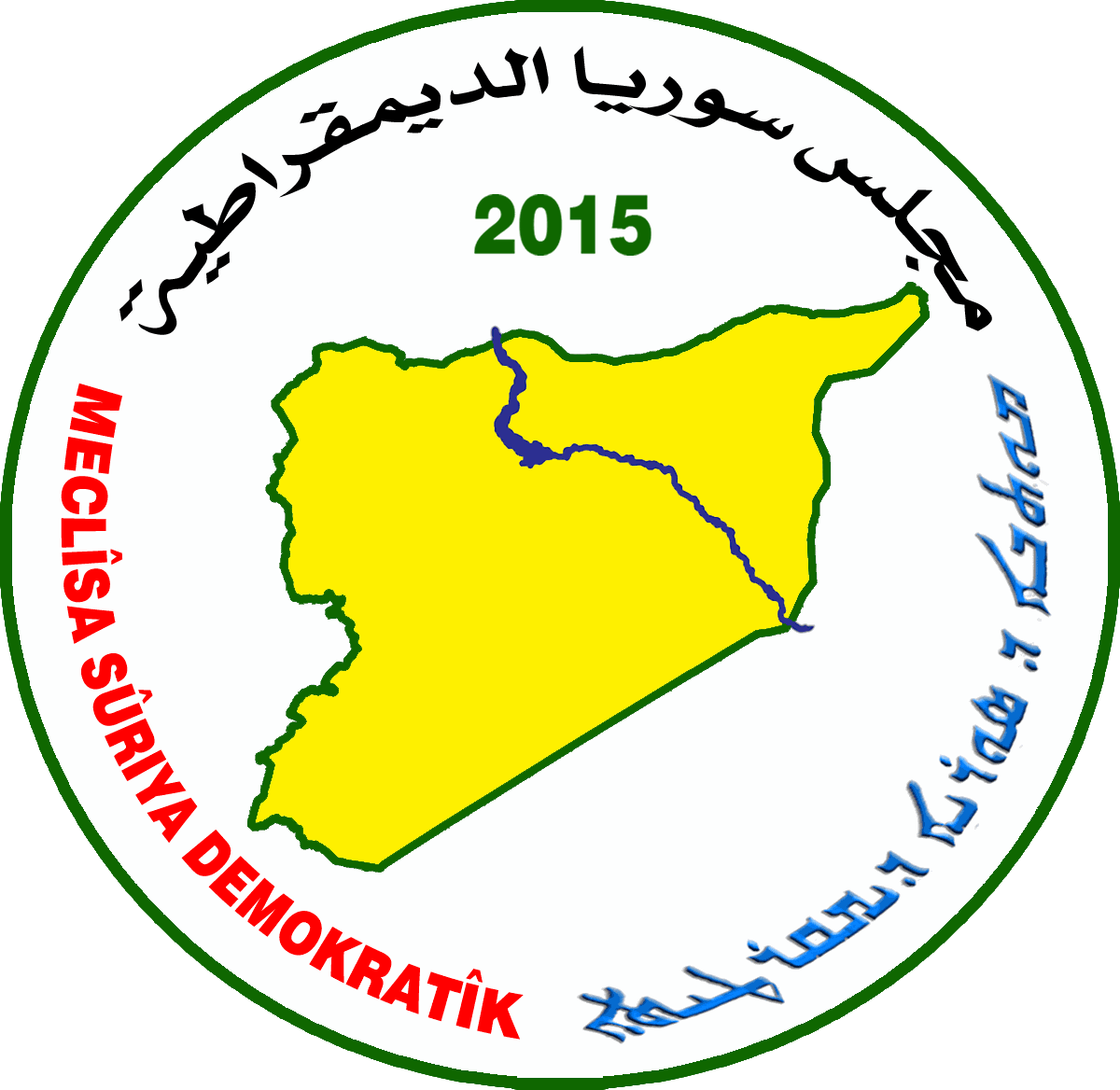
Seal of the Syrian Democratic Council.

Flag of the Syrian Democratic Forces, the official defense force of DAANES.

=== Formerly used ===
Flag used by the administration's diplomatic offices in Europe until 2018.

De facto emblem of Rojava until 2018.

== Other commonly used symbols ==
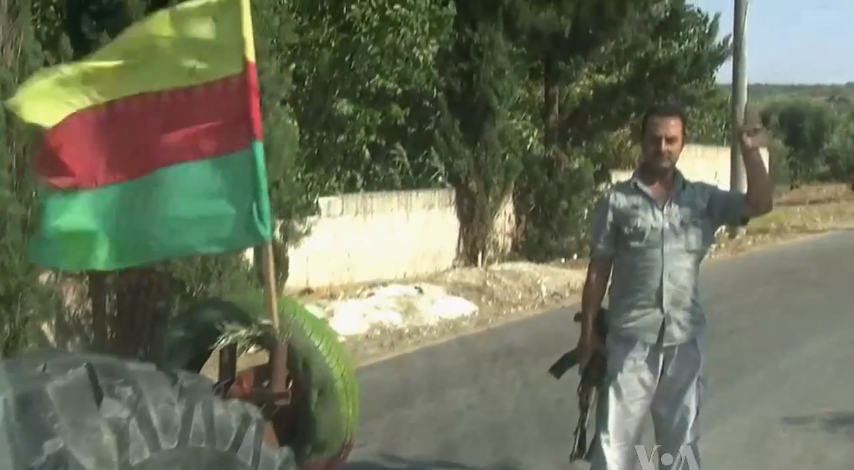
The Rojava tricolor flying at a YPG checkpoint in Afrin, 2012.

The Kurdish flag used by Kurdish parties such as the Kurdish National Alliance in Syria.

Tricolor used by the Syriac Union Party representing Syriac-Assyrian people in North and East Syria.

The Assyrian flag used by the Syriac Military Council, the Khabur Guards and Nattoreh among others.

== Symbols of sub-regions ==
Flag of the Afrin Region.

Seal of the Euphrates Region.

Flag of the Jazira Region.

== See also ==
- Aramean-Syriac flag
