= Kurds in Greece =

Kurds in Greece Οι Κούρδοι στην Ελλάδα Kurdên li Yewnanîstanê
Total population
- No official census statistics 1,000 (1993 KIP estimate); 40,000 (2016 KIP estimate)

Regions with significant populations
- Athens, Laurium, Lesbos, Nea Smyrni, Patras, Thessaloniki

Languages
- Greek, Kurdish

Religion
- Islam, Yazidism

Kurds in Greece (Greek: Οι Κούρδοι στην Ελλάδα, Kurdish: کوردێن یەونانستانـێ, lit. 'Kurdên li Yewnanîstanê') are the people in Greece of Kurdish origin. Kurds have primarily migrated to Greece due to war and persecution. Most asylum seekers in Greece during the 1990s were Kurds from mainly Iraq but also from southeastern Turkey. A total of 43,759 Kurds entered in Greece in the latter part of 1990s, in which 40,932 were from Iraq and 2,827 from Turkey. However, only 9,797 of these sought asylum in Greece.

The social relations between Greeks and Kurds are described as 'good' and researcher Papadopoulou argues that the reason for this is the experience of fleeing among Greeks themselves. In an interview with Kurdistan 24, Greek Minister for Migration Ioannis Mouzalas stated that Greeks and Kurds of Greece have exceptional ties. The Kurds of Greece frequently hold pro-Kurdish protests and various Kurdish cultural centers have been opened all around Greece. During the 1990s, Turkey frequently accused Greece of harboring Kurdish rebels of Kurdistan Workers' Party.

== See also ==
- Death of Alan Kurdi
- Greece–Kurdistan Region relations
