= Noureddin Issa Ahmed =

Syrian politician and military commander (born 1969)

- نور الدين عيسى أحمد

Governor of Hasakah
- Incumbent
- Assumed office 13 February 2026
- President: Ahmed al-Sharaa
- Preceded by: Major general Jaiz Swadet al-Hamoud al-Musa

Personal details
- Born: 1969 (age 56–57) Qamishli, al-Hasakah, Syrian Arab Republic
- Education: Damascus University
- Profession: Politician
- Nickname: Abu Omar Khanika
- Military career
- Allegiance: Syrian Democratic Forces (2014–2026)
- Rank: Commander
- Conflicts: Syrian civil war

Noureddin Issa Ahmed (Note: Arabic: نور الدين عيسى أحمد, Kurdish: نورەدین عیسا ئەحمەد, romanized: Nûredîn Îsa Ehmed) (born 1969), also known as Abu Omar Khanika, is a Syrian politician, engineer, and military commander who has been serving as the Governor of Hasakah Governorate since 2026.

Born in Qamishli, Hasakah Governorate of Syria to a well-known family from the Khanika neighborhood, he completed his higher education at the Faculty of Mechanical and Electrical Engineering at Damascus University in 1993. After graduating, he worked as an engineer at the Directorate of Telecommunications, holding several positions in Qamishli and Hasakah.

During the Syrian revolution, he participated in demonstrations against the Assad regime, which led to his dismissal from his engineering post in 2012. Following the establishment of Democratic Autonomous Administration of North and East Syria, he joined its administration and, in 2014, served as a public officer within the Syrian Democratic Forces (SDF). He later became a member of the group’s general command and served as the director of “Alaya” prison in Qamishli. He was also known for mediating conflicts between Arabs and Kurds and for maintaining close ties with influential Kurdistan Workers' Party political figures.

Following the signing of an agreement between the SDF and the Syrian government after the northeastern Syria offensive, the SDF named Ahmed as Governor of al-Hasakah. He took office on 7 February. His nomination was later approved by the Syrian transitional government, and President Ahmed al-Sharaa officially appointed him as Governor of al-Hasakah on 13 February 2026.

== Biography ==
=== Early life and education ===
Ahmed was born in Qamishli in 1969 to a well-known family in the Khanika neighborhood of Qamishli. He completed his higher education at the Faculty of Mechanical and Electrical Engineering of Damascus University in 1993. He is Kurdish.

=== Career ===
Upon finishing his studies in Damascus, Ahmed worked as an engineer at the Directorate of Telecommunications. During his engineering career, he held several positions in Qamishli and Hasakah. During the Syrian revolution, he participated in several demonstrations against the Ba'athist government, which led to his being fired from his engineering job in 2012.

After the founding of the DAANES, Ahmed joined the DAANES government. In 2014, he served as the public officer of SDF. Within the SDF, he also became a member of the group's general command and the Director of “Alaya” prison in Qamishli. Furthermore, he was known for resolving conflicts between Arabs and Kurds and having close ties with influential PKK political figures.

=== Governor of Hasakah ===
After the signing of the SDF and the Syrian government agreement, SDF named Ahmed as the Governor of Hasakah. He took office on 7 February. His nomination as Governor of Hasakah was approved by the Syrian transitional government. President Ahmed al-Sharaa officially appointed Ahmed as Governor of Hasakah on 13 February 2026.

As a governor, Ahmed created a medical committee of three whose task was to restructure the Hasakah healthcare sector in accordance with the Ministry of Health's structure.

== Personal life ==
Ahmed is married and his son, Omar, died in the Siege of Kobanî fighting against ISIS.
