= Kharab al-Jir base =

Syrian military installment in the Rmelan base

- Al-Hasakah Governorate in Syria

Site information
- Owner: Syrian Armed Forces
- Operator: Currently (Syria) Syrian Army; Formerly (until 2026) (United States) U.S. troops

Kharab al-Jir base (Arabic: خراب الجير) is a Syrian military installation inside the Abu Hajar Airport in Al-Hasakah Governorate, northeastern Syria.

According to the Syrian Observatory for Human Rights, the US equipment was transported by a cargo plane to the US military base at Kharab al-Jir Airport in October 2025.

In February 2026, coalition forces were reportedly withdrawing from the Kharab al-Jir base, dismantling or destroying parts of the facility, and transferring equipment to Iraq as part of a broader US withdrawal from the country. Following the withdrawal of US forces, the Syrian army took over the base in March.
