= Mohammed Abdul Ghani =

Syrian military officer

- Native name: محمد عبد الغني
- Born: Syria
- Allegiance: Syria
- Rank: Lieutenant Colonel
- Commands: Internal Security in Aleppo Governorate
- Known for: Internal Security Chief in Aleppo Governorate
- Conflicts: Syrian civil war

Mohammed Abdul Ghani (Arabic: محمد عبد الغني) is a Syrian military officer who serves as the Internal Security Chief and Director of the Public Security Department in Aleppo Governorate.

== Career ==
In March 2025, Abdul Ghani implemented an agreement stipulating the integration of Syrian Democratic Forces civil and military institutions with state institutions in Aleppo. In April 2025, he oversaw the first phase of the agreement, during which 200 prisoners were exchanged between the two sides.
