= Sheikh Maqsood =

Kurdish neighborhood in Aleppo, Syria

Sheikh Maqsood الشيخ مقصود Şêx Meqsûd
- Neighborhood
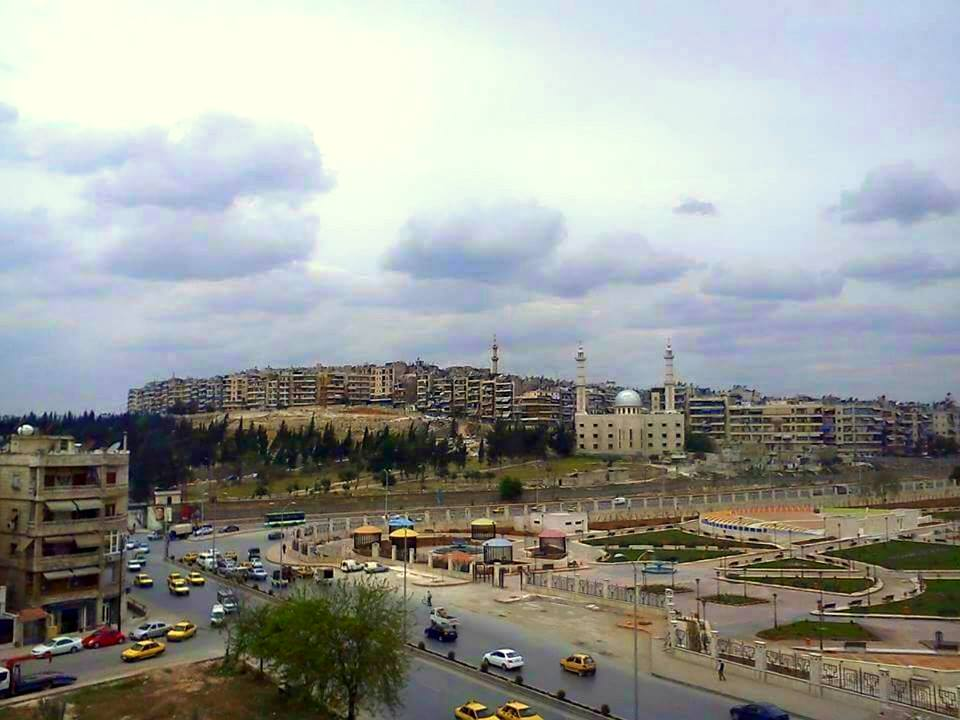
- Sheikh Maqsood in 2011
- Interactive map of Sheikh Maqsood
- Location in Aleppo, Syria Sheikh Maqsood (Syria)
- Coordinates: 36°14′10″N 37°9′6″E
- Country: Syria
- City: Aleppo

Population (May 2016)
  - Total: 30,000
- Time zone: UTC+2 (AST)
  - Summer (DST): UTC+3 (DST)

Sheikh Maqsood (Arabic: ٱلشَّيْخ مَقْصُود, romanized: aš-Šayḵ Maqṣūd, IPA: [aʃ.ʃajx maq.sˤuːd]; Kurmanji Kurdish: Şêx Meqsûd, IPA: [ʃeːx mɛq.suːd]), sometimes spelled al-Sheikh Maqsoud, Maqsud or Maksud, is a Kurdish-majority neighborhood in the city of Aleppo, Syria.

== History ==
The neighborhood had a thriving Sufi community in 2010.

=== Kurdish control ===
During the Syrian Civil War, the Kurdish-majority People's Protection Units (YPG) took control of the neighborhood in 2012. Separated from the larger Kurdish regions of Syria, Sheikh Maqsood had been vulnerable to assaults by the Al-Nusra Front and other Islamist rebel groups which were besieging the district from all directions but the south and west until they were driven back by pro-government forces in 2016.

Islamist rebel groups frequently shelled Sheikh Maqsood. In May 2016, Amnesty International's regional director suggested that the attacks on Sheikh Maqsood constituted war crimes. Between February and April 2016, more than 83 civilians were killed by the attacks. In mid-June 2016, Russia accused the rebel militias of causing the death of over 40 civilians that month. A Syrian Democratic Forces (SDF) spokesman accused rebels of causing 1,000 civilian deaths and injuries, through their shelling of Sheikh Maqsood.

A United Nations report from February 2017 came to the conclusion that, while during the siege of Eastern Aleppo the attacks against Sheikh Maqsood decreased, Islamist rebel groups affiliated with Fatah Halab, after vowing to take revenge on the Kurds in Sheikh Maqsood, intentionally attacked civilian neighborhoods of the Kurdish enclave – killing and maiming dozens of civilians – and that these acts constituted the war crime of directing attacks against a civilian population.

On 22 February 2018, it was reported that the YPG had agreed to hand over the eastern districts of the city of Aleppo to the Syrian government. According to Syrian state television, this decision was made to reinforce positions around the region of Afrin, and to halt Turkey's offensive. This came days after pro-Syrian government fighters agreed to bolster the Kurdish forces in the northwest.

SOHR and a witness later said that Syrian government forces had entered the areas controlled by the Kurdish fighters. YPG spokesman Nouri Mahmoud however denied this claim. A YPG commander later stated that Kurdish fighters had shifted to Afrin to help repel a Turkish assault. As a result, he said the pro-Syrian government forces had regained control of the districts previously controlled by them.

In February 2023, the neighborhood was affected by an earthquake.

=== Conflict with transitional government ===
Following the fall of the Assad regime in 2024 and the subsequent capture of Aleppo by Hay'at Tahrir al-Sham (HTS), the Sheikh Maqsood and Ashrafieh neighborhoods retained their autonomy as the SDF denied other militants access to the areas. Kurdish control over the districts was later solidified through multiple agreements between the SDF and the Syrian transitional government (STG) in December 2024 and April 2025. The agreements stipulated that only the SDF-affiliated internal security forces (Asayish) may remain in both neighborhoods. On 4 April the first SDF convoys started leaving the neighbourhood towards Tabqa in DAANES-administered territory (Rojava) and transferred control to the Asayish.

==== Blockade during conflict ====
In September 2025, it was reported that the SDF had 1,000 Asayish security forces stationed in the Sheikh Maqsood and Ashrafieh neighborhoods. The Asayish came under attack by government forces on at least two occasions since the agreement in April.

Beginning in July and continuing through September, the STG imposed restrictions on oil supplies entering the neighborhood, constructed earthen barriers and fortified positions, and deployed additional military reinforcements in its vicinity amid rising tensions with the SDF. In August, Nouri Sheikho, Deputy Head of the General Council of Sheikh Maqsoud and Ashrafiyeh, told Kurdistan24 that tensions had risen in recent days following the “Unity of Components” conference in Hasakah.

==== Military clashes ====
On the early hours of 6 October, an explosion of unknown origin occurred in the Ashrafiyah neighborhood, damaging a hospital. Later that day the government closed all seven roads leading into the Kurdish-majority neighborhoods of Sheikh Maqsood and Ashrafiyah in Aleppo, placing the two quarters “under a complete siege.” The Transitional Government provided no explanation for the move. On the same evening, large protests by local residents took place in front of STG military positions, during which protesters chanted Mazloum Abdi's name and called on the SDF to “liberate” Aleppo. The protest was met with live ammunition and tear gas, according to the SOHR and several Kurdish outlets. North Press Agency claimed that 15 civilians were injured by the STG's use of violence. After dispersing the protesters, heavy clashes erupted between STG fighters and Kurdish forces stationed in Aleppo. The UK Representation of the Syrian Democratic Council (SDC) claimed additionally that 50 civilians were injured by the Syrian Army's heavy artillery shelling on the neighbourhoods. In a statement, the government's Ministry of Defense claimed that the operation constituted a “redeployment and repositioning,” asserting that “there are no intentions for any military operations.” State-run Syria TV and SANA reported that one government fighter was killed and three others were injured in the clashes, while shifting responsibility to the SDF for the fighting. An official Syrian source told Al Jazeera that three government fighters were killed. During the fighting internet and telecommunications networks had been completely cut off. A local ceasefire agreement for the area was reached in the early hours of 7 October. Following the clashes, Kurdish media reported that two civilians were killed and more than 60 others were injured, while Syrian state media claimed that one civilian was killed and five were injured. The SOHR confirmed the death of one civilian. Demonstrations were held across several Kurdish-majority cities in north and east Syria in solidarity with the residents of Sheikh Maqsoud and Ashrafieh.

Between 6 and 9 January, intense clashes occurred in Sheikh Maqsood and Ashrafieh neighborhoods between Syrian government forces and the Kurdish Asayish-SDF. The fighting began after a drone strike injured two civilians, prompting Kurdish forces to attack a government vehicle, followed by heavy artillery shelling of residential areas by government forces. On 7 January, the Syrian Army launched a large-scale combined-arms assault, declaring Kurdish military positions "legitimate targets". Thousands of civilians were displaced, while Kurdish forces repelled initial armored advances. On 8 January, hostilities continued with sustained artillery bombardment, including strikes on a hospital, resulting in significant civilian casualties. Supported by Turkish drones and aided by defections from al-Baggara tribal fighters, Syrian government forces infiltrated and ultimately captured the Ashrafieh neighborhood. On 9 January, after securing Ashrafieh, the Syrian government announced a unilateral ceasefire and offered Kurdish fighters evacuation. The Kurdish councils rejected the proposal, while government forces continued attempts to advance into Sheikh Maqsood.

Finally, on 10 January, the Syrian government captured the neighborhood, ending 10 years of SDF control. According to the SOHR, the SDF began mobilizing heavy equipment and soldiers in Deir-Ezzor in response to the attacks.

== Demographics ==
In 2003, the neighborhood had a population of 108,601 people.
