= List of military actions conducted by the Martyr Haroun Units =

List of some of the military actions conducted by the Martyr Haroun Units as claimed by the Syrian Democratic Forces (SDF).

List of military actions conducted by the Martyr Haroun Units as claimed by the SDF
Location	Part of	Date	Casualties/Result (SDF Claim)
Manbij city and its countryside	Manbij offensive (2024)	December 9, 2024	1+ killed and multiple injured 6 vehicles damaged
Manbij countryside	Manbij offensive (2024)	December 10, 2024	1+ killed and multiple injured multiple vehicles damaged
Qara Qozaq, Tishrin Dam vicinity	East Aleppo offensive	December 12, 2024	2+ killed or injured 4 vehicles destroyed or damaged
Qara Qozaq, Tishrin Dam vicinity	East Aleppo offensive	December 13, 2024	several killed or injured 6 gathering points targeted 1 vehicle damaged
Tishrin Dam vicinity	East Aleppo offensive	December 15, 2024	1 killed and multiple injured 1 vehicle damaged
Tishrin Dam vicinity	East Aleppo offensive	December 17, 2024	(Turkey) 1 radar jamming system destroyed
Tishrin Dam vicinity	East Aleppo offensive	December 18, 2024	several killed and injured 1 vehicle destroyed and 1 truck damaged
Qara Qozaq, Tishrin Dam vicinity	East Aleppo offensive	December 19, 2024	several killed or injured 2 vehicles and 1 bulldozer damaged
Tal Tamir, Tishrin Dam vicinity	East Aleppo offensive	December 21, 2024	1 killed and several injured 1 armored vehicle destroyed
Southeastern countryside of Manbij	East Aleppo offensive	December 23, 2024	3 vehicles destroyed and 1 damaged 2 M113's severely damaged
Southeastern countryside of Manbij,Qara Qozaq	East Aleppo offensive	December 25, 2024	4 killed and 1 injured 3 vehicles destroyed (Turkey) 1 ACV-15 destroyed
Southeastern countryside of Manbij, Tal Arish	East Aleppo offensive	December 26, 2024	several killed and injured 1 vehicle destroyed 1 armored vehicle destroyed
Abu Qilqil, Alloush	East Aleppo offensive	December 27, 2024	several killed and injured 4 vehicles destroyed
Manbij countryside	East Aleppo offensive	December 30, 2024	(Turkey) 1 ACV-15 destroyed (Turkey) 2 radar jamming systems destroyed
Tel Arish, Alloush and Dayr Hafir	East Aleppo offensive	January 3, 2025	vehicle convoy destroyed 1 artillery piece and 1 Grad destroyed
Tel Arish, Alloush and "Syriatel hill"	East Aleppo offensive	January 6, 2025	several killed and injured several vehicles destroyed 2 APC's and 1 armored vehicle destroyed (Turkey) 1 radar system destroyed
Tel Arish, Alloush, "Syriatel hill" and Tal Al-Zamala hill	East Aleppo offensive	January 8, 2025	1 APC destroyed
Southeastern countryside of Manbij	East Aleppo offensive	January 12, 2025	1+ killed and several injured 4 vehicles destroyed 1 APC and 1 armored vehicle destroyed
Southeastern countryside of Manbij	East Aleppo offensive	January 13, 2025	1+ killed and several injured 3 vehicles destroyed several APC's damaged or destroyed and 1 armored vehicle destroyed
Southeastern countryside of Manbij, “Abu Saeed farm", Al-Imam hill	East Aleppo offensive	January 14, 2025	several killed and injured 1 armored vehicle destroyed, 4 damaged
Eastern countryside of Manbij	East Aleppo offensive	January 15, 2025	1 vehicle destroyed 1+ tank and 2+ armored vehicles destroyed or damaged
Eastern countryside of Manbij	East Aleppo offensive	January 16, 2025	2 gathering points targeted 3 vehicles destroyed
“Syriatel hill“	East Aleppo offensive	January 17, 2025	several killed and injured
Eastern countryside of Manbij, Abu Qilqil, Dayr Hafir, Qara Qozaq, Al-Imam hill, “Syriatel hill“	East Aleppo offensive	January 18, 2025	17+ killed and 21+ injured 1 vehicle damaged and 1 destroyed 1 tank damaged, 3 armored vehicles destroyed (Turkey) 4 injured
Al-Imam hill in the village of Khirbet al-Zamala	East Aleppo offensive	January 19, 2025	29 killed and 17 injured 4 vehicles destroyed 3 tanks and 3 armored vehicles destroyed 1 ammunition depot targeted
Al-Imam hill in the village of Khirbet al-Zamala, "Syriatel hill", Dayr Hafir	East Aleppo offensive	January 20, 2025	10+ gathering points targeted 4 vehicles and 1 motorcycle destroyed
Dayr Hafir	East Aleppo offensive	January 22, 2025	5 killed and 8 injured 1 vehicle destroyed
Al-Hoshriya, Atshana, Dayr Hafir	East Aleppo offensive	January 23, 2025	several killed and injured multiple vehicles targeted
Southern countryside of Manbij, "Syriatel hill", Dayr Hafir	East Aleppo offensive	January 24, 2025	several killed and injured 2 vehicles destroyed (Turkey) 1 SERHAT II radar system destroyed
"Khudey Hill", "Nowruz", Dayr Hafir	East Aleppo offensive	January 26, 2025	several injured 2+ vehicles destroyed
"Syriatel Hill", "Martyr Sawsan Camp", "Khudey Hill", "Nowruz Hill"	East Aleppo offensive	January 27, 2025	several killed and injured 2 gathering points destroyed 2 vehicles destroyed 1 tank destroyed
Southwestern Manbij	East Aleppo offensive	January 28, 2025	(Turkey) 2 T-155 Fırtına destroyed
Qara Qozaq hills	East Aleppo offensive	January 29, 2025	(Turkey) 1 fortified military position destroyed
South of Manbij, Qara Qozaq hills	East Aleppo offensive	January 30, 2025	several killed (including Uzbek nationals) and injured 3 vehicles damaged several armored vehicles damaged or destroyed (Turkey) 3 injured (Turkey) 1 fortified military position targeted
Eastern countryside of Manbij	East Aleppo offensive	January 31, 2025	2 vehicles destroyed
Qara Qozaq hills	East Aleppo offensive	February 1, 2025	(Turkey) 1 military camp targeted
Northern countryside of Tishrin Dam	East Aleppo offensive	February 2, 2025	2 killed and 6 injured
Northern countryside of Tishrin Dam	East Aleppo offensive	February 5, 2025	2 killed 1 motorcycle destroyed
Dayr Hafir, Qara Qozaq hills	East Aleppo offensive	February 7, 2025	1 vehicle destroyed 1 APC destroyed 1 tent destroyed (Turkey) 1+ injured (Turkey) 1 fortified military position targeted
Qara Qozaq hills	East Aleppo offensive	February 12, 2025	2 injured (Turkey) 3 killed (Turkey) 1 fortified military position destroyed
Khirbet Al-Zamala, Tishrin Dam countryside, Qara Qozaq hills	East Aleppo offensive	February 14, 2025	Multiple killed and injured (Turkey) 1 excavator destroyed
Southern countryside of Manbij, "Syriatel hill", Haj Hussein village	East Aleppo offensive	February 17, 2025	1+ killed and multiple injured 1 vehicle destroyed
Southern countryside of Manbij	East Aleppo offensive	February 25, 2025	1 killed and 2 injured
Southern countryside of Manbij	East Aleppo offensive	February 27, 2025	1 toyota type vehicle damaged 1 APC destroyed
Southern countryside of Manbij	East Aleppo offensive	February 28, 2025	1 rocket artillery destroyed
Dayr Hafir	East Aleppo offensive	March 6, 2025	unknown number of casualties 1 fortification destroyed
Southeastern countryside of Manbij	East Aleppo offensive	March 7, 2025	1 pickup truck damaged
Northern Tishrin Dam	East Aleppo offensive	March 8, 2025	2 killed 1 vehicle destroyed
Southern countryside of Manbij	East Aleppo offensive	March 10, 2025	1 vehicle destroyed
Qara Qozaq hills	East Aleppo offensive	March 12, 2025	1 pickup truck damaged 1 BRDM damaged (Turkey) 4 injured (Turkey) 2 radar systems destroyed (Turkey) 1 APC destroyed
Southern countryside of Manbij	East Aleppo offensive	March 14, 2025	2 killed 1 vehicle destroyed 1 ammunition depot destroyed
Manbij countryside	East Aleppo offensive	March 18, 2025	Unknown
Western Tishrin Dam and Qara Qozaq hills	East Aleppo offensive	March 22, 2025	1 vehicle destroyed (Turkey) 1 fortification destroyed
Kobane countryside	2026 northeastern Syria offensive	January 20, 2026	Unknown
