= 2024 Kobani clashes =

Part of the Syrian Civil War

- Part of Operation Dawn of Freedom, Turkish offensive in northern Syria (2024–present) and Turkish involvement in the Syrian civil war
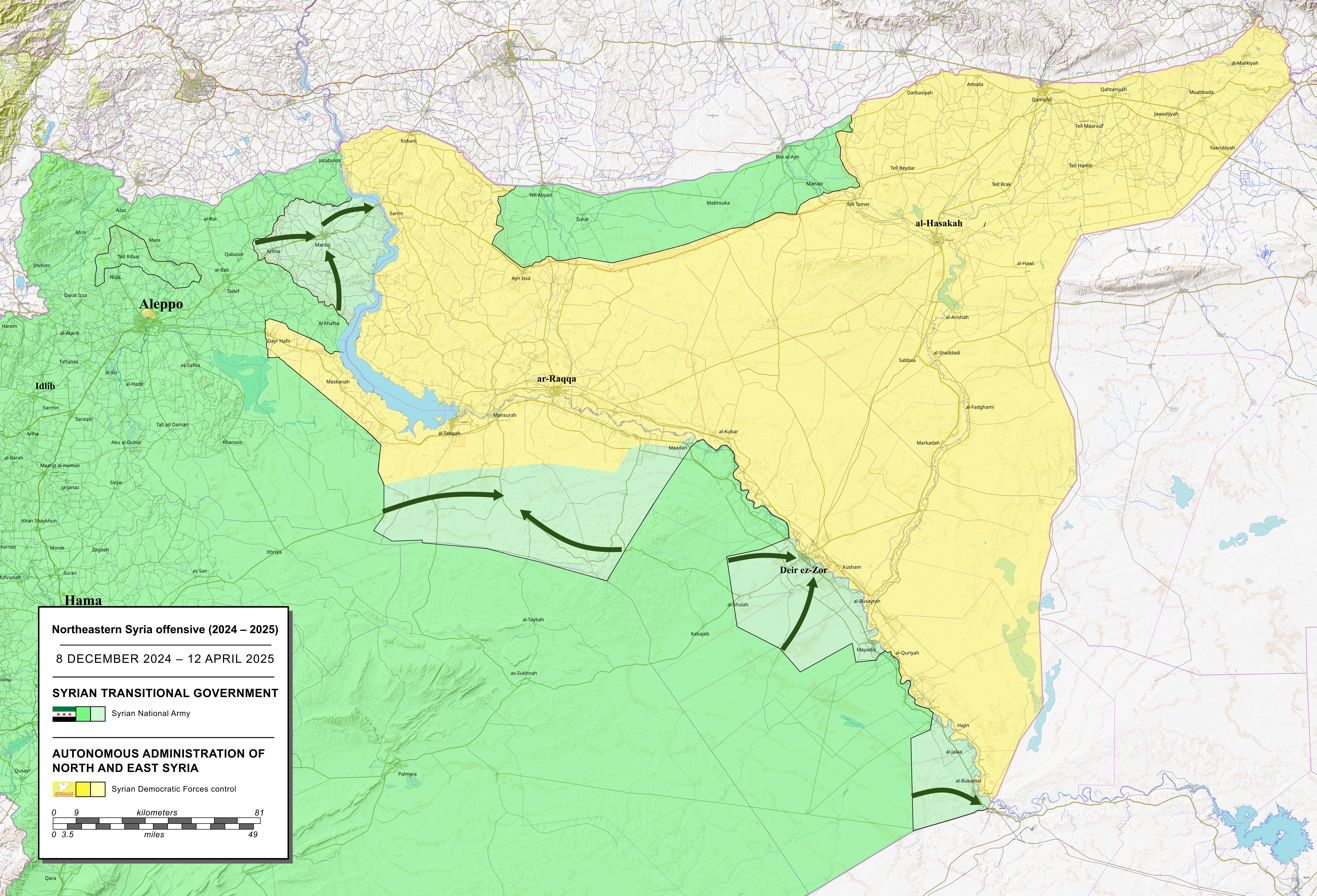
- Controlled by the en:Syrian Interim Government Controlled by the en:Democratic Autonomous Administration of North and East Syria
Date	8 December 2024 – 23 December 2024 (15 days)
Location	Ayn al-Arab District in eastern Aleppo Governorate, Syria; Parts of the al-Raqqa and western Aleppo countryside
Status	SDF victory; US mediated truce; Airstrikes across Kobanî and in the countryside, SNA ground operations against the Tishrin Dam; SNA fail to capture Tishrin Dam and Qara-Qowzak Bridge; Counteroffensive by the SDF

Belligerents
(Syrian opposition) Syrian Interim Government; Turkey	Democratic Autonomous Administration of North and East Syria

Commanders and leaders
(Syrian opposition) Hassan Hamada (Syrian opposition) Abdurrahman Mustafa; Metin Gürak	Mazloum Abdi; Ferhad Şamî; Nuri Mahmoud

Units involved
(Syrian opposition) Syrian National Army; (Syrian opposition) Dawn of Freedom Operations Room; Turkish Armed Forces; Turkish Air Force	Syrian Democratic Forces

Casualties and losses
Per SOHR: (Syrian opposition) 34 killed (Note: 4 killed on 13 December, 4 killed on 17 December, 21 killed on 18 December, 5 killed on 20 December); 5 captured c. 450 killed (SDF claim) (Note: "Dozens" on 10 December and 210 on 13 December); 39 vehicles 6 tanks (SDF claim)	Per SOHR: 22 killed (Note: 11 killed on 9 December, 6 killed on 11 December, 5 killed on 21 December)
- 11 civilians killed by SNA/TAF (Note: 2 killed on 17 December, 2 killed on 20 December, 5 killed on 21 December, 2 killed on 22 December); 15 Assadist/Ba'athist Syrian soldiers killed

The 2024 Kobani clashes were a military campaign conducted by the pro-Turkish Syrian National Army (SNA) and the Turkish Air Force against Syrian Democratic Forces (SDF) following the successful 2024 Manbij offensive. The offensive was part of the broader Turkish offensive in northern Syria, and was launched with the intent to capture the Kurdish-majority city of Kobanî and positions in Ayn al-Arab District to the east of the Euphrates. The offensive was initiated with numerous airstrikes across the Kobanî countryside, and on the Tishrin Dam standing on the Euphrates between recently captured Manbij District territories and the Ayn al-Arab District.

== Offensive ==
From 8 December 2024, clashes took place on the Qara Qozak Bridge of the M4 Motorway and the Tishrin Dam, both critical Euphrates crossings, with the SDF claiming to have killed dozens of SNA fighters.

Beginning on 9 December, pro-Turkish Syrian National Army (SNA) military forces conducted drone strikes against the Tishrin Dam on the Euphrates, resulting in severe damage to its electrical generation infrastructure. The attack rendered the facility partially inoperative, causing widespread power outages across numerous population centers dependent on the dam for electricity. Dam personnel became trapped within the facility due to the surrounding combat operations, prompting urgent appeals from its staff to stop all combat operations at the dam due to its importance as essential civilian infrastructure across the region. On 9 December 11 SDF fighters were also killed in a Turkish drone strike on an SDF position near Qarquzaq bridge east of Manbij.

Kobani, Ayn Issa, Zormixar, Berkel Hill, Miştenûr Hill, and the Qereqozax bridge and nearby positions were bombarded with UAVs on the same day. Three members of SDF's Internal Security fighters were killed in a drone strike on the Qereqozax bridge. Two children were killed by heavy weapons in Kon Eftar village on the outskirts of Kobani.

The airstrikes were coupled with ground operations by Turkish-backed factions to take the dam out of Syrian Democratic Forces (SDF) control and cross into Ayn al-Arab District, which reportedly led to the deaths of dozens of SNA troops and the destruction of several of their vehicles.

Also on 11 December, six fighters of the SDF's Manbij Military Council were killed in a Turkish drone strike near Qarquzaq bridge, south of Ayn al-Arab. An elderly woman was killed and her grandson injured after their civilian vehicle was targeted by machine gun fire while crossing the bridge to return home to Manbij.

On 12 December, the Syrian Observatory for Human Rights (SOHR) reported that Turkish Armed Forces and the Dawn of Freedom Operations Room initiated violent attacks on the Tishrin Dam using heavy weaponry such as tanks and drones. The SOHR warned that the assaults could potentially trigger a dam failure and lead to a significant humanitarian crisis. The same day, a truce mediated by the United States was announced.

On 14 December, diplomatic efforts mediated by the international coalition to establish a ceasefire between Turkish-backed forces and the SDF collapsed. Following the breakdown of negotiations, local sources reported that Turkish and Turkish-backed forces initiated significant military mobilization around strategic locations, particularly near the Qarqozak Bridge and along Kobani's borders along the Syria–Turkey border.

Iraqi and Syrian water experts confirmed the development of cracks in the Tishrin Dam's main wall following continuous military bombardments on the dam, and warned of the increasing possibility of a dam breach should military combat continue in the area. The experts predicted that a breach could produce multiple waves as high as seven meters that could travel into Iraq and destroy several river settlements in Al Anbar Governorate.

In December 2024, the factions supported by Turkey announced they would discontinue the ceasefire with groups supported by the US, such as Syrian Democratic Forces. One news article noted: "The SNA, an umbrella of several armed factions, informed the SDF on Monday that it would be returning to 'a state of combat against us,' one of the sources briefing Al-Monitor said. The sources said negotiations between the SDF and the SNA had 'failed' and that 'significant military buildups' in areas east and west of the Kurdish town of Kobani on the Turkish border were being observed." On 17 December 2024, the truce was extended by a week. On 18 December 2024, Turkish backed groups violated the ceasefire and attempted an incursion into SDF territory, the incursion failed with 21 SNA fighters dying in the clashes, five SNA members were likewise captured.

Since the beginning of December, Turkish airstrikes left 20 SDF fighters, 15 former SAA soldiers and 16 civilians killed during Operation Dawn of Freedom.

Furthermore, two Kurdish journalists were killed in a Turkish airstrike on their car in Ain-Al Arab countryside.

On 21 December, five civilians were killed in a Turkish airstrike. Five SDF fighters were killed by Turkish artillery shelling of positions on Tishrin Dam.

On 22 December, two civilians were killed following Turkish artillery shelling of Kobani.

Turkish and SNA attacks on the Kobani countryside and Tishrin Dam continued into 2025 as part of the broader Turkish offensive in northern Syria. The attacks killed 121 civilians in December 2024 and January 2025.

== See also ==
- East Aleppo offensive (2024)
- Siege of Kobanî
- Kobanî massacre
- Tishrin Dam offensive
