= East Aleppo offensive (2024–2025) =

SDF operation against Syrian National Army in eastern Aleppo Governorate

- Part of Aftermath of the Syrian civil war, the Turkish–SNA offensive in Northern Syria and Turkish involvement in the Syrian civil war
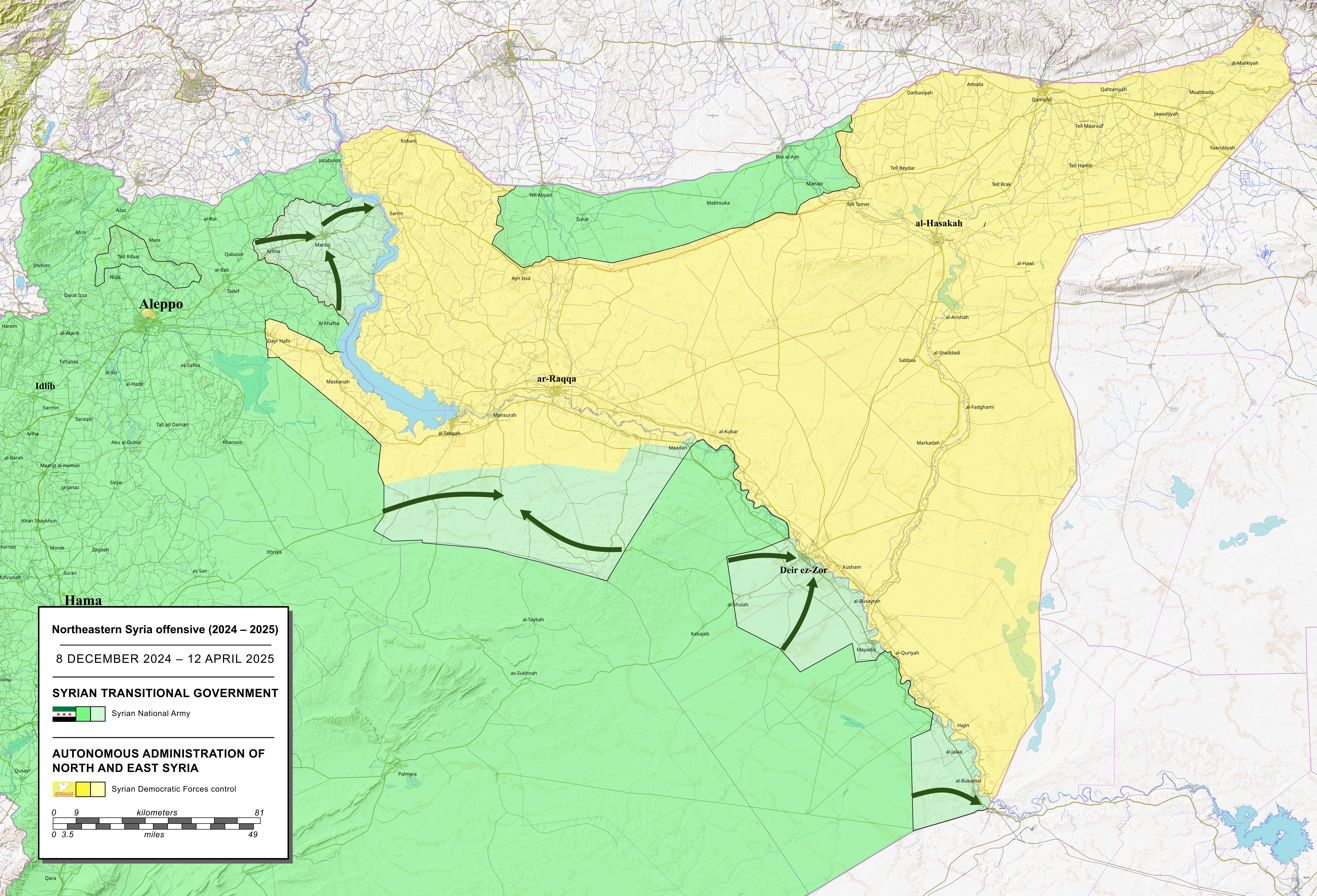
- Territorial control in Manbij
Date	23 December 2024 – 12 April 2025 (3 months, 2 weeks and 6 days)
Location	East Aleppo Governorate, Syria
Result	SDF secures the Qara Qozak bridge and the Tishrin Dam and its surrounding areas.; Several failed attempts by SNA to capture the Tishrin Dam.; SDF and the Syrian transitional government agree to joint control over the Tishrin Dam following the 10 March agreement (Implementation delayed, still under sole SDF control).

Belligerents
Democratic Autonomous Administration of North and East Syria	(Syria) Syrian Interim Government (until 30 January); Turkey

Commanders and leaders
(Democratic Autonomous Administration of North and East Syria) Salih Muslim Muhammad; Mazlum Abdi; Ferhad Şamî; Shervan Derwish; Dilsuz Hashme; Mohammed Raouf; Nuri Mahmoud; Polat Can; Nesrin Abdullah	Abdurrahman Mustafa; Fadlallah al-Haji; Adnan al-Ahmad; Abu Amsha; Munir Hajak †; Ahmed Othman; Selçuk Bayraktaroğlu; Metin Gürak; Ziya Cemal Kadıoğlu

Units involved
Syrian Democratic Forces; Manbij Military Council; Tabqa Military Council; People's Protection Units; Women's Protection Units; Martyr Haroun Units	Syrian National Army; Sultan Murad Division; Sultan Suleiman Shah Brigade; Sultan Mehmed the Conqueror Brigade; Turkish Armed Forces; Turkish Land Forces; Turkish Air Force

Casualties and losses
Per SOHR: 115 killed (since 12 December 2024); Dozens wounded SDF claim: 88 killed (as of 13 January 2025)	Per SOHR: 488 killed (since 12 December 2024); Dozens wounded 6 killed, 11 injured 19 Turkish drones (2 Bayraktar TB2 drones destroyed 17 small drones destroyed); 3 radar system destroyed SDF claim: 324 killed Dozens wounded 25+ vehicles destroyed (Syrian opposition) 40+ armored vehicles and 8 tanks destroyed, 2 tanks seized (Note: 1 tank and 2 armored vehicles destroyed, 2 tanks seized and 1 armored vehicle destroyed, 1 armored vehicle destroyed, 1 armored vehicle destroyed, 1 armored vehicle destroyed, 1 BMB destroyed and 1 tank disabled 1 tank and 6 armored vehicles destroyed, 1 armored vehicle destroyed, 2 APCs and 1 armored vehicle destroyed, 1 tank destroyed and several BMBs damaged, 3 armored vehicles, 1 APC and 1 BMB destroyed, 5 armored vehicles destroyed 16 vehicles including 3 tanks destroyed, 3 tanks and 5 vehicles destroyed, 4 armored vehicles destroyed, 1 tank destroyed); 2 radar jamming systems destroyed 3 Bayraktar TB2 destroyed 1 TAI Anka and 1 TAI Aksungur destroyed Per Turkey: 1 killed
- 73 civilians killed (since 12 December 2024)

The East Aleppo offensive was an operation launched by the Syrian Democratic Forces (SDF) in December 2024 against the Turkish-backed Syrian National Army (SNA) to secure territory that was lost during the Manbij offensive and to advance from Dayr Hafir into the Tishrin Dam area. The fighting took place in the context of the Turkish offensive in northern Syria and was part of the longer term conflict between Turkey (and its local allies) and the Democratic Autonomous Administration of North and East Syria (DAANES), occurring in the aftermath of the fall of the Assad regime. The fighting resulted in the SDF securing the Qara Qozak bridge spanning across the Euphrates, and the Tishrin Dam and its surrounding areas. The dam and other areas were supposed to be jointly controlled by the Syrian transitional government (STG) and the SDF, following the 10 March agreement.

== Background ==
Following the SNA capture of Manbij city on 11 December, a temporary ceasefire agreement in the region was reached between the SNA and SDF through U.S. mediation. However, military activities did not cease, which eventually resulted in fighting in the Kobani countryside. In addition, the SNA refused the evacuation of SDF fighters or civilians from Manbij, executed captured SDF soldiers and attempted offensive operations against the SDF, resulting in fighting near the Tishrin Dam. The following week, the SNA stated that they ended the US-brokered ceasefire with the SDF. Turkey stated that the ceasefire did not exist.

The offensive began after the December 2024 conference, in which numerous Syrian rebel factions agreed with de facto leader Ahmed al-Sharaa to dissolve their groups and become part of the country's new Ministry of Defense. The SDF did not participate in this meeting in Damascus.

== Offensive ==
=== SDF advances and capture of the Tishrin Dam ===
The Manbij Military Council of the SDF initiated an offensive against the Syrian National Army near the Tishrin Dam on 23 December 2024. The SDF managed to take control over several villages south east of Manbij.

The following day, SDF started assaults in two different directions. At the Dayr Hafir front, the SDF advanced from the Jirah Military Airbase along the west bank of the Euphrates where they took control of the Babiri water pumping station, five kilometres south of the town of Al-Khafsah and advanced from the Tishrin Dam into the Abu Qalqal district. Further north, fighting also started around the Qarah Qawzak bridge. A spokesperson of the Women's Protection Units (YPJ) stated that its fighters were located just over 11 kilometers (7 miles) away from the center of Manbij city. On 26 December, the Turkish Ministry of Defense announced that the SNA had taken control of the Tishrin Dam, but SDF spokesperson Ferhad Şamî refuted these claims, posting a video of himself at the dam. The next morning, fighting reached the surroundings of the Najm castle.

Between 27 and 31 December, the clashes continued mainly in the Abu Qalqal direction, where the SDF claimed to have captured three villages west of the Tishrin Dam. During the fighting, the SDF claimed to have killed Abu Fayez, the commander of the SNA-affiliated North Commando Brigade. The SDF also expressed concerns that the Turkish Armed Forces are establishing two military bases in the Manbij countryside. The Deputy Press Secretary of the Pentagon, Sabrina Singh, stated during a press briefing that the US-brokered ceasefire around the city of Manbij is "still holding" despite the concurrent fighting.

In early January 2025, both sides attacked each other with drone strikes, including a Turkish drone strike targeting the sugar factory in Dayr Hafir. The SNA, backed by Turkish artillery, launched an attack on Khirbet Zamalah south of the Tishrin Dam. The SDF on their part managed to down a Turkish Bayraktar TB2 drone in the southern Kobani countryside. Continued clashes between SDF and SNA forces occurred west of the Tishrin Dam and further north near the Qarah Qawzak bridge. At least 50 SNA and 12 SDF fighters were killed in the clashes. The Institute for the Study of War (ISW) assessed that the SDF may seek to link-up their forces with these two advances to strengthen supply lines. Local media reported at the time that the US was building bases near the city of Kobane though the reports have been denied by the Pentagon. On 4 January, clashes continued in the vicinity of the Tishrin Dam and Jisr Qarqozak, leaving 20 SNA and 11 SDF fighters dead.

=== SNA reinforcements and counterattacks ===
In the Dayr Hafir direction, the SNA reportedly managed to outflank the most southern advance of the SDF seizing a couple of villages south of Maskanah. Meanwhile, the first talks between the new Syrian government and the SDF emerged in Damascus. The SNA began bringing in reinforcements towards the Tishrin direction on 8 January and additionally redeployed to other SNA-SDF frontlines suggesting a potential offensive against the SDF from the "Peace Spring" area. Turkish Foreign Minister, Hakan Fidan, threatened to launch a military operation against the Kurdish forces in northern Syria "if the YPG does not abandon Syria".

Between 9 and 18 January the SNA continued to press the SDF bridgehead at the Tishrin Dam retaking two hills northwest of it. On the southern side of the salient fighting took place in the villages of Atshana and Khirbet Zamalah. Over 70 SNA and 14 SDF fighters were reportedly killed during the clashes. Moreover, fighting continued to take place at both the Tishrin axis as well as the Qarah Qawzak bridge area. The Sultan Suleiman Shah Brigade was reportedly seen firing artillery towards SDF positions near Tishrin on 22 January. Towards the end of January, battles took place around the villages of Abu Qalqal, Tel Arish, and Najm. The SDF launched drone attacks on SNA positions, destroying a radar system and military vehicles. Amid the clashes, a YPJ commander succumbed to injuries sustained in battles near Tishrin Dam. Turkish aircraft conducted airstrikes on SDF positions near Dayr Hafir and the Qarah Qawzak bridge area.

=== Positional fighting and ceasefire ===
Throughout February, movement along the frontlines largely stalled with continuous positional battles taking place at the directions of Qarah Qawzak, Tishrin, Dayr Hafir and Al-Khafsah. Both sides conducted artillery, mortar, and rocket bombardments. Multiple Turkish airstrikes were conducted during the month, as they reached as far as Ain-Issa, Raqqa and Deir-Ez-Zor, while suicide drones of the Martyr Haroun Units and ATGM strikes by the YPJ, targeted SNA positions as well as Turkish military bases in the Manbij countryside. Fighting towards the end of the month shifted to the Qara Qozak frontline, as the SNA tried to isolate the SDF. The SOHR estimated that 56 SNA, 25 SDF members and 3 TAF soldiers were killed in February.

Mutual shelling continued into March, with no significant territorial changes. On 5 March, pro-SNA media reported that the SDF was still in control of parts of the surrounding mountains and the village of Mahshiyet Al Sheikh, located 4.6 km (about 2.8 miles) west of the dam. SNA artillery from the Peace Spring area hit the M4 highway, Ain-Issa and Raqqa on multiple occasions, supported by the Turkish Air Force, which separately targeted positions on and behind the frontline, including Sarrin. Turkish military bases west of the Euphrates continued to come under SDF artillery and mortar fire.

Towards the end of March the frontlines calmed down, amid reports of Kurdish news outlets, which suggested that a potential ceasefire agreement between the SDF and Turkey might be brokered by the International Coalition. This coincided with a prisoner/body exchange between the SDF and SNA consisting of 40 bodies and 25 detained fighters including four Turkish nationals and a much lower number of casualties for the month (30 SNA, 7 SDF and 1 TAF), as reported by the SOHR.

On 12 April, the SDF and the Syrian transitional government closed an agreement in which the Kurdish forces withdrew to the eastern bank of the Euphrates river. At the same time, government security forces deployed at the Tishrin Dam to establish a barrier between SDF and SNA forces.

== Talks ==
=== Syria–SDF ===
In January 2025, talks started between the new HTS-led Syrian government and the SDF in Damascus. The focus of the negotiations was to settle the Kurdish forces into the new administration and to resolve the conflict with the SNA. SDF commander Mazloum Abdi has said that one of his central demands is a decentralised administration, in which he proposed to integrate the SDF with the new Defence Ministry, but as "a military bloc" without dissolving the group. This proposal was rejected by Syria's new defence minister Murhaf Abu Qasra stating that such a bloc "is not right." Abu Qasra expressed his desire to finish the integration process by 1 March. At the same time, he did not rule out the use of force should the negotiations fail.

On 29 January, HTS leader Ahmed al-Sharaa was appointed as the interim Syrian president. The spokesperson of Syria's military operations, Hassan Abdul Ghani, announced on state media the dissolution of all armed factions in the country, which includes the SNA and al-Sharaa's own HTS. In his first interview as president, al-Sharaa told reporters of The Economist that he opposes a federal system in Syria. Moreover, al-Sharaa said that Turkey was planning to launch a full-fledged operation in the north against the Kurdish forces, but he asked them to wait in order to give space for negotiations to reach an agreement with the SDF.

An agreement was reached by Syria with the SDF on 10 March. Al-Sharaa and Abdi signed a document in Damascus to integrate the SDF into Syria's state institutions. This will place all public institutions in the northeast under the administration of the Syrian state, including border crossings, airports and oilfields. The deal also includes the recognition of Kurdish rights and speaks of the participation of all Syrians in the country's new political process. Full implementation of the agreement is expected by the end of the year.

=== Turkey–United States ===
Parallel talks took place between officials of NATO allies Turkey and the United States. Turkey has had ties with HTS, supporting the group in their fight against the Syrian Arab Republic, while the SDF has been a close ally of the United States during their fight against ISIL. The biggest concern on both sides is that failure to reach an agreement will prolong the 13-year civil war. UN Envoy Geir Pedersen stated that he hoped the warring parties would take their time for a diplomatic solution "so that this does not end in a full military confrontation". He also said that Ankara and Washington have a key role in supporting this effort.

Newly appointed Secretary of State Marco Rubio reaffirmed U.S. support to the Kurdish forces in Syria during his confirmation hearing. Shortly after assuming office, Rubio held his first call with Turkish Foreign Minister, Hakan Fidan, in which he "highlighted the need for an inclusive transition in Syria". Fidan in return emphasised during a meeting with the Iraqi Foreign Minister, Fuad Hussein, his call for the Kurdish YPG to disband from northeastern Syria. Turkey views the YPG as an extension of the PKK, which is widely regarded as a terrorist organization.

== Civilian casualties and war crimes ==
=== Tishrin Dam protests ===
On 8 January, residents from Al-Hasakah city headed towards the Tishrin Dam to participate in a sit-in protest in support of the SDF and against Turkish attacks in the region. The civilian convoy was attacked by a drone coming from SNA controlled areas, killing 5 civilians and injuring 15 others.

Protests at the Tishrin Dam have continued on a daily basis since then, and protestors have come under frequent bombardment by Turkish and SNA forces. The attacks have killed 24 civilians and injured over 200 others. The strikes have destroyed 4 ambulances, killed 3 paramedics, injured 8 journalists and a German peace activist. These attacks raised broad demonstrations across DAANES controlled areas in northeastern Syria condemning the attacks against civilians.

An airstrike on 18 January led to the death of Kurdish comedian Bavê Teyar. A week later, on 26 January, Turkish drones continued to harass the civilian rally, leaving two civilians dead and 10 injured. Hiba Zayadin, Senior Middle East and North Africa researcher at Human Rights Watch, stated that the SNA and Turkey "appear to be celebrating" these attacks on unarmed civilians.

=== Other areas ===
On 28 January, a Turkish airstrike hit a public market in the town of Sarrin, resulting in the deaths of 13 civilians and injuries to 20 others, including women and four children.

Human Rights Watch has called out various atrocities committed by the SNA and Turkey, including the targeting of an ambulance carrying injured civilians, which it described as a "war crime" stating that "striking an ambulance carrying wounded civilians on an open road is unlikely to be an accident." On 29 January, a Turkish air strike resulted in the deaths of three civilians and seven injuries in Kobani (Ayn Al Arab).

On 3 February a car bomb was detonated in the city of Manbij, killing at least 20 people, most of them women who were agricultural workers. Both parties blamed each other for conducting the attack. Shortly after, Syria's presidency made a statement in which they vowed to punish those who are responsible. On 15 February, a journalist was killed in a Turkish airstrike near Tishrin Dam.

== See also ==
- Tishrin Dam offensive
- East Aleppo offensive (2017)
- 2019 Tell Rifaat clashes
- 2020–2021 Ayn Issa clashes
