= Martyr Haroun Units =

- Yekineyên Şehîd Harûn
- Active: December 2024 – August 2026
- Country: Syria
- Allegiance: Autonomous Administration of North and East Syria
- Branch: Air Force (Drone Warfare)
- Type: Air Unit
- Role: Drone warfare, reconnaissance, airstrikes
- Size: Unknown (TBD)
- Part of: Syrian Democratic Forces (SDF)
- Equipment: DJI Mavic drones
- Notable Operations: Syrian conflict; Manbij offensive (2024); East Aleppo offensive (2024–2025); 2026 northeastern Syria offensive

The Martyr Haroun Units (Kurmanji Kurdish: Yekineyên Şehîd Harûn, Arabic: وحدات الشهيد هارون), was an air unit of the Kurdish-led Syrian Democratic Forces that specialized in drone warfare.

The unit was named in honor of Haroun Qamişlo, who lost his life resisting the Syrian National Army (SNA) during the 2024 Manbij offensive.

== History ==
=== First appearance ===
The Martyr Haroun Units first emerged during the battles around the Manbij countryside in December 2024. Since then, they have been conducting reconnaissance and striking operations along the Tishrin Dam, Qara Qozak Bridge and Dayr Hafir frontline against the SNA and the Turkish Armed Forces. The military actions of the drone force have played a vital role in keeping the SNA west of the Euphrates by applying pressure on troop buildups.

Following release of FPV drone footage, fundraising initiatives by the Kurdish youth, such as Drones For Rojava, began appearing to fund the purchase and transfer of DJI Mavic drones to the SDF. Donations are received via Bitcoin and Ethereum cryptocurrencies to evade the Turkish intelligence agency.

During their strikes against Turkish military bases in the Manbij countryside, the unit managed to destroy one and damage another Turkish-made T-155 Firtina.

From January to February 2025, the unit conducted almost 200 strikes against SNA and Turkish forces.

== Capabilities and training ==
The Martyr Haroun Units employ drone tactics similar to those used in the Ukraine war, with a strategic focus on disabling and destroying enemy vehicles. This approach was notably observed during attempts by SNA forces to advance toward the Tishrin Dam using Turkish-supplied armored vehicles. According to Militant Wire, 57% of the unit's strikes observed during the battle for the Tishrin Dam targeted vehicles.

Operations are coordinated from semi-fixed command rooms, sometimes located in tunnels, equipped with multiple screens and ground support equipment several kilometers behind the front line, while rapidly deployable drone teams using portable ground-control stations provide additional tactical flexibility.

The unit primarily uses commercially available drones, such as DJI Mavic and Autel models, modified to drop repurposed VOG-17 grenade munitions or configured as loitering (“kamikaze”) drones carrying adapted RPG warheads. According to Militant Wire, the unit’s drone operations consisted primarily of FPV attacks (63.7%), followed by explosive drops (36.3%).

=== Rojava Drone School ===
According to Intelligence Online, the Kurdish drone unit received training by two former U.S. Army Green Berets from the 10th Special Forces Group, who are affiliated with the Forward Operations Group (FOG), a community of special forces veterans, set up by former U.S. soldier Derrick Bales. Furthermore the publication reported that Kurdish fighters receive this kind of drone pilot training at the so-called Rojava Drone School, where they are provided with access to specialized drone simulation software. U.S. trainers reportedly provided the unit with instruction in drone programming and the establishment of in-house production units using 3D printers. They also shared manufacturing schematics originating from Ukraine and conducted training courses for the unit on systems programming and the use of forward-looking infrared (FLIR) cameras. Several more FOG members are involved in the fundraising and delivering of components.
