= 2025 Tishrin Dam protests =

Anti-Turkish protests in Syria

- Part of Turkish offensive in northern Syria (2024–2025) and the East Aleppo offensive (2024–2025)
- Date: 8 January 2025 — 12 April 2025
- Location: Tishrin Dam in the Democratic Autonomous Administration of North and East Syria
- Caused by: Turkish and Turkish-backed Syrian National Army bombardment of the Tishrin Dam
- Goals: Ending the bombardment of the Tishrin Dam; Preventing Turkish occupation of northeast Syria
- Methods: Demonstration, protest, sit-in
- Status: Ended

Casualties
- Deaths: 25 killed
- Injuries: 221 injured

The 2025 Tishrin Dam protests refers to a series of sit-in demonstrations by residents of North and East Syria to protest the Turkish bombardment of the Tishrin Dam. The dam has been the target of attacks by the Turkish Armed Forces and the Turkish-backed Syrian National Army (SNA) during the Turkish offensive in northern Syria, which have rendered the dam inoperable since 10 December 2024, depriving over 413,000 people of water and electricity. On 8 January 2025, a convoy of residents of North and East Syria headed to the Tishrin Dam to protest the ongoing attacks. The convoy was struck by a Turkish drone, killing five civilians and injuring 15 others. Since then, daily protests have erupted at the dam. Turkish and SNA attacks on the dam have continued, killing 25 civilians and injuring over 200.

== Background ==
The Tishrin Dam protests take place in the broader context of the Turkish offensive in northern Syria (2024–present). Shortly after the start of the 2024 Syrian opposition offensives that led to the fall of the Assad regime in Syria, the Turkish-backed SNA launched an offensive against the Kurdish-led Syrian Democratic Forces (SDF). Turkey maintains that the SDF is an extension of the Kurdistan Workers Party (PKK), designated as a terrorist organization in Turkey. Turkey routinely classifies Kurdish SDF fighters as separatists, though the organization has consistently maintained that it does not seek secession or independence. Accordingly, Turkey has sought to weaken the SDF and dismantle the SDF-controlled Democratic Autonomous Administration of North and East Syria (DAANES).

After capturing the city of Manbij from SDF forces, the SNA began targeting critical river crossings within SDF territory, including the Qara Qozak Bridge and Tishrin Dam. On 10 December 2024, Turkish drones struck the dam's electrical generators, cutting electricity and water to 413,000 residents of Manbij and the Kobani areas. The dam has been inoperable since then, and the International Committee of the Red Cross has warned of disastrous humanitarian and environmental consequences if the dam is further damaged. Turkish and SNA attacks on the Tishrin Dam continued almost daily throughout the month of December and into January 2025, when the protests begun.

== Protests ==
On 7 January 2025, local government officials and members of the SDF-aligned Democratic Union Party (PYD), which dominates the civil administration of the DAANES region, called on residents of the DAANES to participate in a protest at the Tishrin Dam denouncing the Turkish and SNA attacks. The following day, a convoy of local residents headed to the Tishrin Dam to participate in the sit-in protest. The protest convoy was struck by a Turkish drone as it was on its way to the dam, causing the deaths of 5 civilians and injuring 15 others. Several more strikes hit the road leading to the dam to prevent vehicles from passing. Many of the protestors turned back in fear of being struck, while others continued heading to the dam, some walking five kilometers on foot to reach the dam amid the roadblocks caused by Turkish drone strikes.

SNA commander Abu Salah denied Turkey's responsibility for the killings of civilians, suggesting that the SDF was responsible for the explosions. SNA-affiliated accounts have since posted drone footage of later strikes on the protests, including a strike on a group of dancing protestors with the caption "The armed drone sends congratulations and blessings to the SDF celebrations at Tishreen Dam."

Protests at the Tishrin Dam have continued on a daily basis since 8 January 2025, attracting new groups of protestors from various regions of the DAANES. Protestors of Kurdish, Arab, Syriac, Armenian and Yazidi origin have participated in the protests. Footage from the demonstrations show protestors performing traditional dances and singing Kurdish and Arabic resistance songs.

Turkey and the SNA have continued to strike protest convoys heading to the dam as well as the dam itself. The strikes have killed 25 civilian protestors and injured over 240 others. Four ambulances have been destroyed and 3 paramedics killed in the attacks. The attacks have also killed a journalist and a German humanitarian aid worker, and injured 8 other journalists.

On 5 April another large group of people from Kobani and Ain Issa joined the protests at the dam.

== Reactions ==
Human rights organizations have condemned the Turkish attacks on protestors and the Tishrin Dam. Human Rights Watch (HRW) described a drone strike on a Kurdish Red Crescent ambulance transporting a civilian wounded in an earlier strike on protestors at the dam as an "apparent war crime". Doctors Without Borders expressed alarm over the violence at the Tishrin Dam, particularly the attacks on ambulances and health workers. The Syrian Observatory for Human Rights has categorized the attacks on protestors as human rights violations.

Leaders and residents of the DAANES region have called on the international community to intervene and end Turkey's attacks on civilians and the Tishrin Dam.

=== Allegations of human shields ===
Turkey and Syrian critics of the Kurdish authorities have accused the SDF of using civilian protestors as human shields. These accusations have been repeated by the Syrian Network for Human Rights, whose independence was called into question in January 2025 by the SDF.

HRW analyzed verified videos of the strikes and reported that no visible military targets could be identified. Abu Salah, commander of the SNA's Liwa al-Waqqas brigade, has previously conceded the protest convoys are unlikely to carry weapons or military personnel.

While the civil authorities organizing the protests encouraged their employees and university students to participate in the protests, employees reported that the participation was optional. Some employees declined to attend due to safety concerns, but at least one employee joined due to fear of being ostracized otherwise. Despite the presence of officials and PYD leaders at the protests, protestors insisted to Middle East Eye reporters that they came to the protests on their own accord and were moved to act due to the threat to their community from the Turkish attacks. Similar sentiments have been expressed by protestors to other reporters and human rights organizations. Many protesters were motivated to join the demonstrations after being displaced by Turkish bombardment and occupation of northern Syria, as well as losing water and electricity due to attacks on the Tishrin Dam.
