= Manbij offensive =

Manbij offensive may refer to:

- Manbij offensive (2016), an offensive by SDF against ISIL
- Manbij offensive (2024), an offensive by SNA and Turkish Air Force against SDF
