= Ferhad Şamî =

Syrian Kurdish military figure (born 1986)

Spokesperson of the Syrian Democratic Forces

Personal details
- Born: 1986 (age 39–40) Al-Darbasiyah, Al-Hasakah Governorate, Syria
- Known for: Spokesperson of the SDF
- Website: X profile
- Nickname(s): Farhad Shami, Farhad al-Shami

Military service
- Allegiance: Syria (since 2026); Autonomous Administration of North and East Syria (until 2026)
- Branch/service: (Syria) Syrian Armed Forces; Syrian Democratic Forces (until 2026)
- Rank: Spokesperson
- Battles/wars: Syrian civil war; Battle of Raqqa (2017); Battle of Deir ez-Zor; Tishrin Dam offensive; 2024 Kobani clashes; East Aleppo offensive (2024–2025); Aleppo clashes

Ferhad Şamî, also known as Farhad Shami or Farhad al-Shami (born c. 1986), is a Syrian Kurdish military figure who served as the official spokesperson of the Syrian Democratic Forces (SDF) until its dissolution in 2026, a Kurdish-led alliance of forces involved in the fight against the Islamic State (ISIS) and regional security challenges.

He represented the SDF in media statements, especially during major operations against the Islamic State (ISIS).

== Early life and background ==
Şamî was born in 1986 in Al-Darbasiyah, a town in northeastern Syria. He studied media at Damascus University and began his career as a journalist. He worked with several Kurdish-affiliated news agencies including Firat News Agency, Hawar News Agency, and later as a correspondent for Rudaw and Ronahi TV. Şamî's professional career began with his involvement in media work. He started as a reporter for outlets close to the Kurdish political movement, including the Firat News Agency and Hawar News Agency, both aligned with the Democratic Union Party (Syria) (PYD) and the broader Kurdish nationalist cause. His media work extended to being a correspondent for Rudaw and Ronahi TV, both significant Kurdish media organizations.

His leadership within the Kurdish forces of the Syrian Democratic Forces (SDF), and later his appointment as head of the media office for the SDF, brought him into the spotlight. Before his tenure as the SDF spokesperson, Şamî served as the head of the media office in the Autonomous Administration of North and East Syria (Rojava), particularly overseeing the Jazira Region between 2015 and 2016.

Before becoming the spokesperson of the SDF, Şamî led the media office of the Autonomous Administration of North and East Syria, particularly in the Jazira Region.

== Role in the Syrian Democratic Forces ==
As SDF spokesperson, Şamî has been a central figure in communicating the group's military operations and political positions. He has addressed regional security issues, responses to Turkish military actions in northern Syria, and the challenges of dealing with ISIS detainees.

Şamî has consistently called for international cooperation to ensure stability in northeastern Syria and has emphasized the importance of legal accountability for Islamic State fighters.

== See also ==
- Rojava conflict
- Autonomous Administration of North and East Syria
