= Bavê Teyar =

Kurdish actor and comedian

- باڤێ تەیار
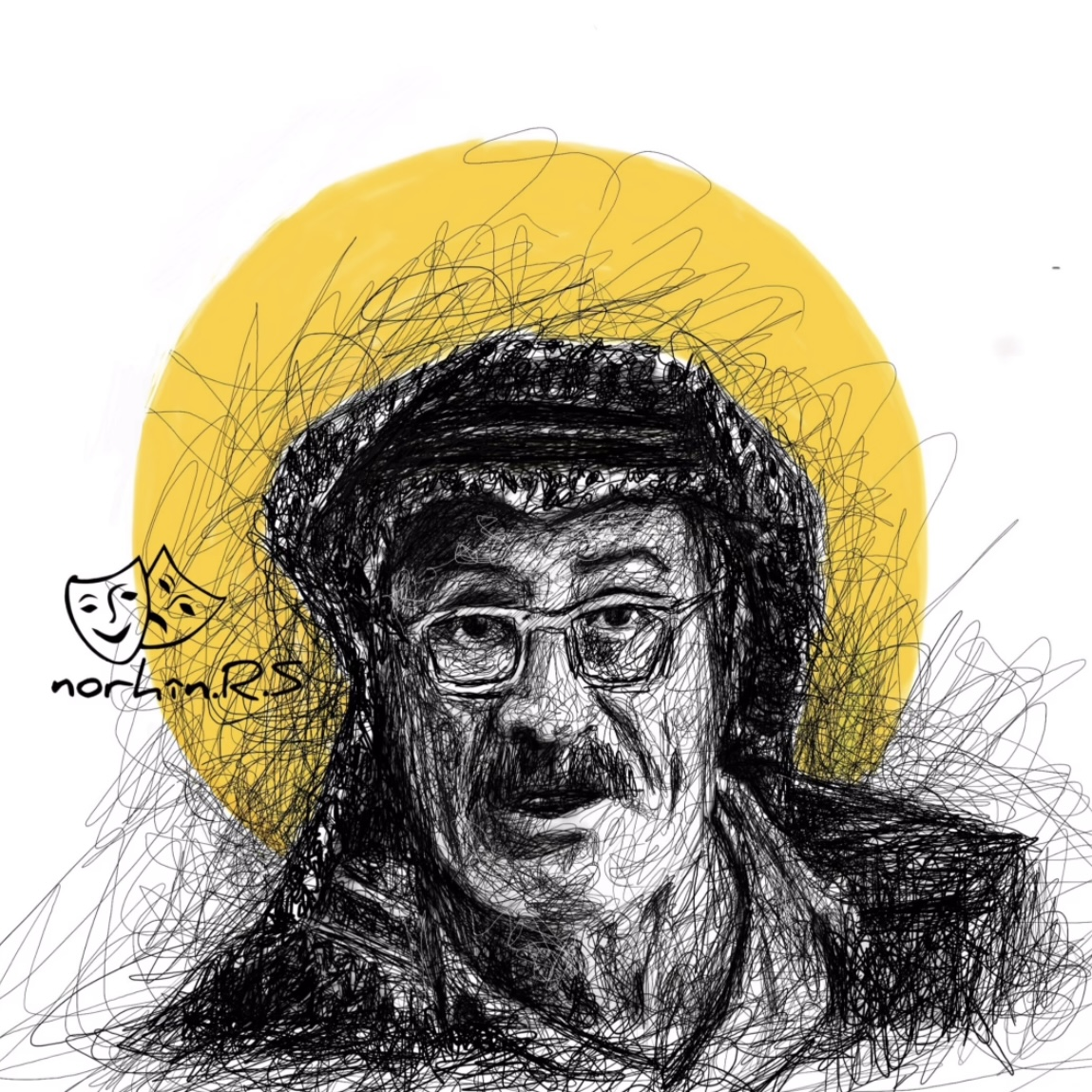
- Drawing in honor of Kurdish artist and actor Bavê Teyar, who was killed by a Turkish drone attack on civilians at the Tishrin Dam
- Born: Juma Khalil Ibrahim (Cuma Xelil Ibrahim); 1961; Qamishli, Al-Hasakah, Syria
- Died: 19 January 2025 (aged 63–64); Tishrin Dam, DAANES
- Cause of death: Injuries from Turkish drone strike
- Burial place: Qamishli, Syria
- Citizenship: Syria
- Occupations: Comedian; Actor; Theatre director; Activist
- Years active: 1980s–2025
- Known for: Kurdish theatre, comedy, activism
- Style: Political satire, social commentary
- Movement: Kurdish cultural movement
- Opponent: Turkish Armed Forces

Juma Khalil Ibrahim, (Kurdish: باڤێ تەیار) known by his stage name Bavê Teyar (1961 – 19 January 2025) was a renowned Kurdish actor, comedian, and cultural icon celebrated for his contributions to Kurdish theatre and music. His stage name, "Bavê Teyar", translates to "Father of Teyar" in Kurdish. Bavê Teyar became a beloved figure across the Kurdish-speaking world for his ability to blend comedy with poignant social commentary in his performances. His work played a significant role in promoting Kurdish cultural heritage.

Bavê Teyar died on 19 January 2025 after being wounded in a Turkish attack on the Tishrin Dam in northern Syria.

== Early life and career ==
Juma Khalil Ibrahim, known by his stage name Bavê Teyar, was born in Qamishli, a city in northeastern Syria, in 1961. From an early age, he developed a strong passion for the performing arts, particularly theatre. He began his career in the 1980s and quickly became a prominent figure in Kurdish theatre, earning recognition for his unique blend of comedy and social commentary. Throughout his more than three-decade-long career, Bavê Teyar's performances often tackled societal issues, including themes of Kurdish identity, resilience, and the struggle for cultural preservation. His ability to combine humor with poignant messages on patriotism and social justice made him a beloved figure in Kurdish cultural circles.

== Activism and Death ==
In January 2025, Bavê Teyar participated in a peaceful sit-in protest at the Tishrin Dam in northern Syria, where he advocated against Turkish and Turkish-backed militia attacks on the region. On 18 January 2025, during the protest, he was critically injured in an airstrike attributed to Turkish forces. Despite receiving medical attention, he succumbed to his injuries the following day, on 19 January 2025.

== Filmography ==
Bavê Teyar was a prominent figure in Kurdish cinema, known for his comedy films that blended humor with social and political commentary on Kurdish identity and resilience. His films, popular among Kurdish-speaking audiences, remain available on YouTube, allowing new generations to experience his work.

Teyar's contributions to Kurdish culture extend beyond his films; his art and activism left a lasting impact, fostering solidarity within the Kurdish community. His legacy as a cultural icon continues to inspire and influence contemporary Kurdish media.
