= Dawn of Freedom Operations Room =

Syrian Military Coalition

- غرفة عمليات فجر الحرية
- Official logo of the "Dawn of Freedom operations room" with the Syrian Opposition flag next to the Name "فجر الحرية" "Dawn of Freedom" in nastaliq
- Founded: November 30, 2024
- Dates active: 30 November 2024 - 12 April 2025
- Allegiance: (Syrian opposition) Syrian Interim Government: Syrian National Army
- Headquarters: Aleppo, Syria
- Ideology: Syrian opposition Anti-Kurdish sentiment (alleged, denied); Syrian nationalism
- Status: Inactive
- Wars: Syrian civil war: 2024 Syrian opposition offensives; Battle of Aleppo (2024); Turkish offensive into north-eastern Syria (2024–2025); Operation Dawn of Freedom; 2024 Manbij offensive; 2024 Kobani clashes

Dawn of Freedom Operations Room (Arabic: غرفة عمليات فجر الحرية, romanized: Ghurfat ʻamalīyāt Fajr al-ḥurrīyah), also known as Fajr al-Hurriya Operations Room, was a Syrian militant operations room that was led by the Turkish-backed Syrian National Army during the Syrian civil war, specifically against both the Syrian Arab Army, the Syrian Democratic Forces and their regiments.

== History ==
Three days after the 2024 Syrian opposition offensives, on 30 November 2024, the Syrian National Army announced the establishment of the Dawn of Freedom Operations Room, named after the Operation Dawn of Freedom with the goal of capturing as much territory from the Syrian Democratic Forces, Syrian Arab Army, Russian and Iranian backed forces. They announced this in Aleppo, as they vowed to liberate all Syrian government and Iranian-backed militia held areas. After its establishment the Dawn of Freedom Operations room pushed north and east of Aleppo after it was taken over by Hayat Tahrir al-Sham, with the operations room taking Tell Rifaat from the Kurdish militants. Though the Dawn of Freedom Operations Room are allies with Hayat Tahrir al-Sham, they later condemned Hayat Tahrir al-Sham for seizing a thermal power station from the Sultan Murad Division in a statement released by the official WhatsApp channel of the organization. The member units of the Dawn of Freedom Operations Room are Sultan Suleiman Shah Division, the Sultan Murad Division, the Liberation and Construction Movement with many others belonging to the Syrian National Army.

=== Manbij offensive ===
After the defeat of most of the Syrian government forces in the north Syrian National Army controlled areas, the Dawn of Freedom Operations Room launched an offensive in Manbij where they subsequently seized control of areas south of Manbij. This was met with resistance from the Manbij Military Council of the Syrian Democratic Forces with clashes happening between the operations room and the Syrian Democratic Forces on the frontlines of Tokhar, Awn Dadat, Arab Hassan Kabir and Al-Arimah with support from Turkish drone strikes against the Syrian Democratic Forces. The Syrian Democratic Forces has escalated their fight with Turkish backed groups during this offensive and during this offensive, the shift of focus between the Syrian Arab Army and its allies to the Syrian Democratic Forces was prevalent.

Despite accusations of anti-Kurdish sentiment, the Dawn of Freedom Operations Room has denied these claims and stated that the Kurdish people are their "brothers".
