= Firat News Agency =

Kurdish news agency

- Formation: 2005
- Headquarters: Amsterdam, Netherlands
- Official languages: Turkish, Kurdic (Kurmanji, Sorani, and Kirmancki languages), English, Arabic, German, Spanish, Russian and Persian
- Website: anfenglish.com

The Firat News Agency (Kurdish: Ajansa Nûçeyan a Firatê, ANF; Turkish: Fırat Haber Ajansı) is a Kurdish news agency that gathers and broadcasts news from the Middle East, broadly concerning Kurdish matters. The news agency has offices in Amsterdam and journalists around the world.

It has been variously described as pro-Kurdish, pro-PKK, or PKK-affiliated. The CBC and Reuters have described the ANF as being "close" to the PKK, and Deutsche Welle states the two entities have "links". The BBC have alternately labelled the ANF "pro-Kurdish" and "pro-PKK".

Because of the ANF's alleged links with the PKK, access to its websites from Turkey has been repeatedly blocked by Turkish courts in what has been described by Danny O'Brien of the Committee to Protect Journalists as a "cat-and-mouse" game. ANF social media accounts active in Turkey have been closed, and its journalists have been detained in Turkey. In addition, Twitter has blocked the ANF at the request of the Turkish government.

In 2011 it was the target of a cyber-attack which removed access to the site.

== Detentions and killings of ANF staff ==
Under the pseudonym Silan Aras, Ayfer Serçe wrote for the ANF until her death in July 2006 in West Azerbaijan province, while covering regional suicides. Reporters Without Borders condemned the killing and demanded the Iranian government investigate.

ANF writer Zeynep Kuray was detained from 2011 to 2013 in a wider Turkish investigation into the operations of the Kurdistan Communities Union, and has been additionally but briefly detained since.

=== Leyla Yıldızhan ===
In 2014 Leyla Yıldızhan, a freelance journalist, writing as Deniz Firat, from the Çaldıran district of Van in Eastern Turkey, was working as a freelance for ANF when she was killed by shrapnel from mortar fire in Makhmur, Iraq whilst covering a battle between Kurdish Peshmerga forces and Islamic State. Yıldızhan also reported for several other Kurdish TV stations, including Sterk TV, Med NUÇE, and Ronahi TV.

Yıldızhans body was sent back to her hometown in Van for her funeral, thousands of mourners met at the hospital, with her coffin, shouldered by Peace Mothers Assembly activists from the hospital to the vehicle, was adorned with the flags of the Kurdish Communities Union and the Kurdistan Workers' Party. Prominent mourners included representatives of the People's Democratic Party (HDP), such as but not limited to local MPs Özdal Üçer and Nazmi Gü, Metropolitan Municipality Co-mayors Bekir Kaya and Hatice Çoban, alongside the HDP party executives of the Democratic Regions Party were in attendance as well as civil society organizations, such as Peace Mothers Assembly activists and representatives of Non-governmental organisations.

Sultan Yıldıztan, the mother of Leyla, who resides in Makhmour refugee camp, has not been able to visit her daughters gravesite in Turkey, expressing desire to do so and a hope that the peace process will allow her to do so, stating that "her [daughters] wish was to be buried in her village. We fulfilled that wish. A grave had been prepared for Deniz in Qandil, but another comrade was buried in the grave that had been prepared. Sometimes I visit that grave as Deniz’s grave. I want to visit Deniz’s grave. Every year on the anniversary of her martyrdom, I send greetings to her. I hope that we too can return to our homeland soon and visit our graves. This is a great pain. Let there be peace so that we can return to our homeland as soon as possible.”

=== Arrest of Maxime Azadi ===
On 15 December 2016, French-Turkish ANF journalist Maxime Azadi was arrested in Belgium after Turkey issued an Interpol Red Notice for his arrest. The ANF appealed for his immediate release.

The arrest was condemned by press freedom groups, who said the incident highlighted Turkey's crackdown on press freedoms following the 2016 coup attempt. The UK-based NGO Fair Trials described his arrest as Turkish misuse of Interpol's Red Notice system, and the Council of Europe's Platform for the Protection of Journalism and Safety of Journalists released a media freedom alert pertaining to the arrest.

The European Federation of Journalists released a statement, stating "We are very concerned about this arrest which constitutes a dangerous precedent. More than 120 journalists are behind bars in Turkey, where the authorities do not hesitate to abuse anti-terrorist laws to suppress the opposition press. Belgium and other European states should not be complicit in the massive purges ordered by the Turkish government. Dozens of Turkish and Kurdish journalists exiled in Europe would be in a situation of dramatic insecurity".

On 23 December that year, Azadi was released on bail, leading the Council of Europe to mark the case resolved, concluding it "was no longer an active threat to media freedom".

== Suppression and restriction ==
Fırat has faced legal issues, censorship and suspensions over the years, which often lead to web address changes and the creation of new accounts. In 2008 Turkish courts ordered an indefinite suspension of Fırat alongside Özgür Gündem for alleged “propaganda in favour of the Kurdistan Workers Party”, and again in 2009, with the blocks being lifted in 2014 after a successful appeal to the Istanbul Duty Heavy.Penal Court, with ANF's lawyer Ramazan Demir quoted at the cession of the case that "the illegality and arbitrariness that has continued for years has thus come to an end," however with the breakdown of the ceasefire and peace negotiations in 2015 the blocks were once again instated when The Ankara Gölbaşı Penal Court of Peace ruled to block 96 websites and 23 Twitter accounts under the premise they were spreading propaganda for the PKK, Islamic State, and the Revolutionary People's Liberation Party/Front. In April of 2025 ANF and its journalists had their Twitter accounts suspended as part of a larger ban wave against journalists in response to a court ruling. Journalist Ruşen Takva, whose accounts have reportedly been repredly suspended for his work, offered his opinion that “the government doesn't want any dissenting voices outside of its official narrative, outside of what it says, outside of its propaganda … They don’t want any dissenting voices in this propaganda war,” by September of the same year ANF was once again blocked from access under the domain name anf-news.com by the Ankara 5th Magistrates' Court on the grounds of 'protecting national security and the public order'.

== See also ==
- Censorship in Turkey
- Access to public information in Turkey
