= Abu Qilqil =

Abu Qilqil أبو قلقل
- Town
- Location of Abu Qilqil in Syria
- Coordinates: 36°26′09″N 38°05′35″E
- Country: Syria
- Governorate: Aleppo
- District: Manbij
- Subdistrict: Abu Qilqil

Population (2004)
  - Total: 2,742
- Time zone: UTC+2 (EET)
  - Summer (DST): UTC+3 (EEST)
- Geocode: C1798

Abu Qilqil is the administrative center of Nahiya Abu Qilqil of the Manbij District.

Abu Qilqil (Arabic: أبو قلقل, also transliterated Abu Qalqal or Qibab Abu Qalqal) is a town in the northeastern Aleppo Governorate, northwestern Syria. The village is located some 10 km (6.2 mi) to the northwest of the Tishreen Dam on the Tishreen Plain, part of the larger Manbij Plain. Nearby localities include district center Manbij 16 km (9.9 mi) to the northwest. In the 2004 census, it had a population of 2,742.
