= Polat Can =

Kurdish political activist

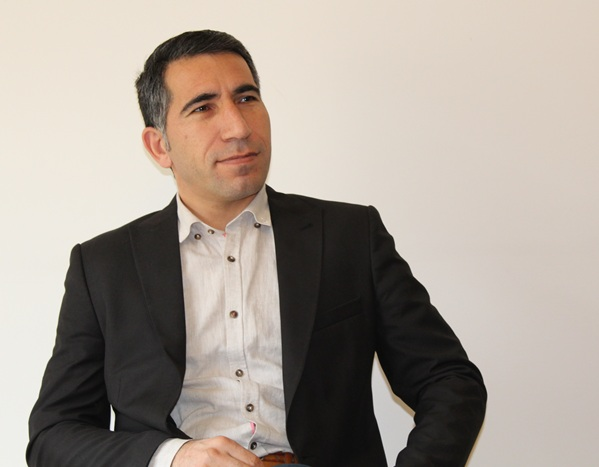
Polat Jan

Polat Can (born 1980) is a Kurdish political activist from Syria. He is one of the founders and main commanders of the People's Defense Units (YPG), and serves as the organization's official spokesperson. He also serves as the coalition commander of the Syrian Democratic Forces.

He is also a journalist and writer, author of a literary production in Kurdish, Arabic and Turkish.

== Biography ==
Born on 20 March 1980 in Kobanê, Polat Can began early in the Kurdish national liberation movement. It first takes place in the ranks of the People's Defense Units (YPG).

He held many positions in the various press services linked to the movement. He was once editor-in-chief of Mesopotamia magazine, published in the Yerevan, and Democratic Middle East magazine, published in Baghdad.

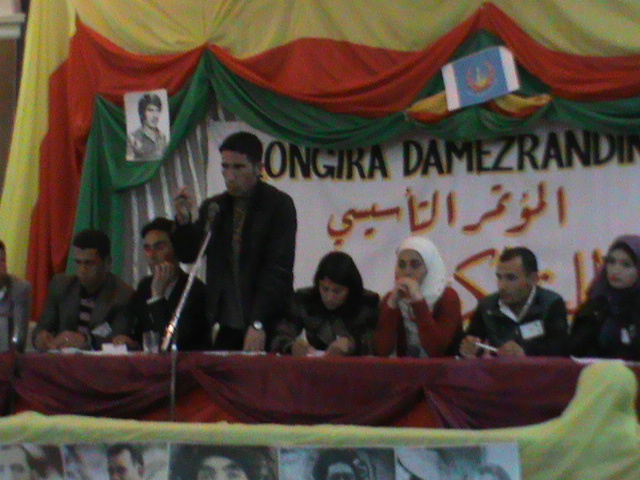
XWENDEKAR conference 27 March 2012

He is one of the founders of the Confederation of Kurdish Patriotic Students(Xwendekar), of which he becomes the general coordinator. He is still responsible for university students at the Mazlum Dogan Academy.

== People's Protection Units ==
Polat Can is one of the founding members of the People's Protection Units (YPG) in Syria. He became the official spokesperson for this organization during the fight against Daesh, during the Syrian civil war (in particular the first and second battles of Kobane). Polat Can, in addition to his functions within the YPG, also assumes a command post within the Syrian Democratic Forces, a coalition of which the YPG is a part but which includes other armed organizations.

== Meeting with the representative of the United States ==
In early 2016, Polat Can met with an official representative of the United States, Brett McGurk, then under President Obama. This meeting was controversial in Turkey.

== Work ==
He writes in Kurdish, Arabic, Turkish and English. Several of his books have been published in five languages. He has written for many years in magazines, newspapers and on the internet.

=== English publications ===
- The Practical projects for Building the Autonomous Administration- 2020
- Solution Prospects – 2021
- My Beating Heart (stories) 2019

=== Kurdish publications ===
- NavName (Kurdish Names Dictionary) 2017–2019
- Berfa Germ (short Stories) 2009/2016/2017–2019
- Qulingên Rewanê (search in Kurdish Classical Music and songs) 2017/2019–2021
- Zimanê Firîşteyan (about Kurdish Language) 2005–2012
- Projeyên Pratîkî yên avakirina Xweseriyê (The Practical projects for Building the Autonomous Administration) 2011–2020
- Asoyên Çareseriyê (Solution Prospects) 2011–2021

=== Arabic publications ===
- آه یا صغیرتی - 2021
- في نقد العقل الشرقي - 2021
- آفاق الحل -2021
- المشاريع العملية لبناء الإدارة الذاتية – 2020
- مدخل إلى الأعلام الكردية – 2012
- لغة الملائكة – 2012
- لمحات عن حزب العمال الكردستاني – 2009
- آفاق كونفدرالية- 2006
- نساء القرنفل
- من روجافا إلى شنكال

=== Turkish publications ===
- Göçmen Yürekler (About Kurdish Women in the Caucasus) 2006
