= Syrian National Army =

Coalition of armed Syrian opposition groups

- الجيش الوطني السوري
- Emblem Flag (Note: The Syrian independence flag was the one most commonly used by the SNA and flown on official occasions. SNA troops also use the Turkish flag alongside the Syrian independence flag.)
- Leaders: Hadi al-Bahra (President of SNC); Abdurrahman Mustafa (Prime Minister of SIG); Brig. Gen. Hassan Hamada (Minister of Defense and Chief of Staff); Brig. Gen. Adnan al-Ahmad; Deputy Chief of Staff); Brig. Gen. Fadlallah al-Haji (Deputy Chief of Staff)
- Dates active: 2017–2025
- Allegiance: Turkey (Syrian opposition) Syrian Interim Government (until 2025); Syria (since 2024)
- Headquarters: Azaz, Syria
- Active regions: Northern Syria: Idlib Governorate; Latakia Governorate; Aleppo Governorate; Hama Governorate; Raqqa Governorate; Hasakah Governorate; Western Libya: Tripolitania Region; Fezzan Region; Karabakh (during the 2020 war)
- Ideology: Anti-Assadism; Syrian opposition
- Status: Dissolved, all factions merged into the Syrian Armed Forces
- Size: 22,000 (2017); 35,000 (2018); 80,000-100,000 (2019, post-NFL merger estimate); 50,000-100,000 (2022); 70,000-90,000 (2024 estimate); 80,000 (2025)
- Part of: (Syrian opposition) Free Syrian Army (2017-2018); Unified Military Council (Idlib)

The Syrian National Army (SNA (Note: Arabic: الجيش الوطني السوري, romanized: al-Jaysh al-Waṭanī as-Sūrī)), also known as the Turkish-backed Free Syrian Army (TFSA), (Note: Arabic: الجيش السوري الحر المدعوم من تركيا) was a coalition of armed Syrian groups that participated in the Syrian civil war. Comprising various rebel factions that emerged at the start of the war in July 2011, it was officially established in 2017 under the auspices of Turkey, who provided funding, training, and military support.

The SNA emerged from the Free Syrian Army (FSA), a loose collection of armed opposition groups founded on 29 July 2011 by defected Syrian military officers. After Turkey formally condemned the regime of Bashar al-Assad in November 2011, it provided arms, training, and sanctuary to the FSA. Initially the principal opponent of the Syrian government, the FSA was gradually weakened by infighting, lack of funding, and rival Islamist groups. In August 2016, Turkey began assembling a new coalition of Syrian rebel groups, which included many former FSA fighters, in an effort to create a more cohesive and effective opposition force; following Operation Euphrates Shield, the Turkish government coordinated with the Syrian Interim Government to form a "National Army" to secure Turkish territorial gains.

The official aims of the SNA were to create a "safe zone" in northern Syria, consolidate with other rebel factions, and combat both Syrian government forces and Islamists. Its presence expanded to the neighboring Idlib Governorate during the Syrian government's 2019 northwestern offensive, after which it incorporated the National Front for Liberation on 4 October 2019.

Closely aligned with the Turkish government, the SNA has been described as an auxiliary army of the Turkish Armed Forces, and also as "mercenaries" by their critics. Outside Syria, SNA fighters have been deployed by Turkey as a proxy force, for example in conflicts from Libya to the south Caucasus. The SNA mostly consists of Arabs and Syrian Turkmen.

In late November 2024, the Syrian National Army participated alongside Hay'at Tahrir al-Sham in the 2024 Syrian Opposition offensives that led to the fall of the Assad regime through Operation "Dawn of Freedom". The SNA captured both regime and SDF controlled areas in Aleppo countryside, including the cities of Manbij, Tel Rifaat and the Shahba region, and supported HTS during the offensives.

It was reported in January 2025 that the Turkish foreign minister Hakan Fidan announced that SNA factions would integrate under the new Syrian Army. At the Syrian Revolution Victory Conference, which was held on 29 January 2025, most factions of the armed opposition, including the SNA, announced their dissolution and were incorporated into the newly formed Ministry of Defense. Over the following days, the transitional government continued integrating armed groups, including factions of the former Syrian National Army. On 3 February, there were circulated reports that the Ministry of Defense promoted two generals of the SNA, Abu Amsha and Saif Abu Bakr, to lead the newly formed 62nd Division and 76th Division of the Syrian Army.

== Composition ==
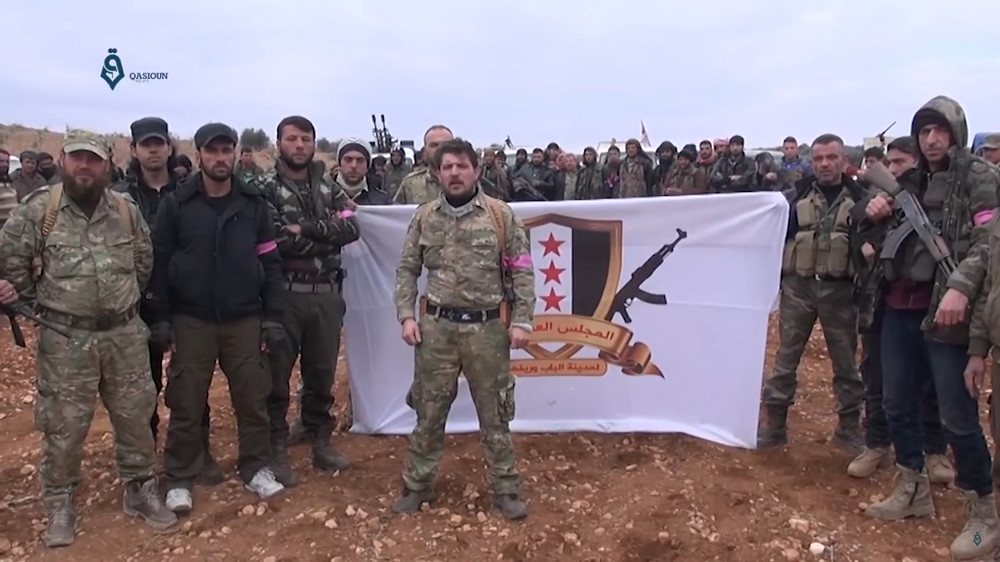
Members of the al-Bab military council, which was part of the SNA's Hawar Kilis Operations Room, during the Battle of al-Bab

The SNA, which includes at least 25,000 fighters, with some sources estimating it to be 70,000, mostly consists of Arabs and Turkmens. The number of Syrian Kurds among the SNA was much smaller. In January 2018, senior SNA commander Azad Shabo said that there were "dozens" among the FSA units such as the Azadî Battalion, while Almodon Online reported about 500 Kurdish fighters overall, including in non-FSA formations such as Ahrar al-Sham, the Levant Front and the Army of Grandchildren. By February 2018, a SNA commander said that 350 Kurds were part of the Syrian National Army.

By the end of June 2017, most Turkish-backed FSA groups reorganized themselves into three military blocs: Victory, Sultan Murad and the Levant. A number of other groups remained independent. On 30 December 2017, the groups unified to form the National Army. By this time, three "legions" (corps) were established as part of the SNA: 1st, 2nd, and 3rd. On 15 March 2018, rebel factions in northern Homs Governorate formed the 4th Legion, though it later transferred to northern Aleppo. Factions also moved from Rif Dimashq Governorate and Damascus to northern Aleppo.

On 4 October 2019, the National Front for Liberation joined the National Army's command structure, planning to become its 4th, 5th, 6th, and 7th legions. Both NFL and SNA fighters were uninformed of the merger, which took place in a press conference in Urfa, southern Turkey, amid Turkish plans to launch an offensive against the Syrian Democratic Forces (SDF).

According to a 2019 research paper published by the pro-government Turkish think tank SETA, "Out of the 28 factions in the Syrian National Army, 21 were previously supported by the United States, three of them via the Pentagon's program to combat Islamic State of Iraq and the Levant (ISIL). Eighteen of these factions were supplied by the CIA via the MOM Operations Room in Turkey, a joint intelligence operation room of the "Friends of Syria" to support the armed opposition. Fourteen factions of the 28 were also recipients of the U.S.-supplied TOW anti-tank guided missiles."

In April 2021, an additional military formation was made in Idlib, named 'al-Quwat al-Radifa' (Auxiliary Forces).

By September 2021, groups under the Syrian National Army have coalesced into two main blocs: the Azm Operations Room and the Syrian Front for Liberation. Speaking of these blocs, a freelance journalist based in the region said that "These formations are only for show and they are not united in reality. Each faction still has its own leaders and members who do not take orders from the leaders of other factions. These formations only aim to protect themselves. Whenever factions feel threatened, they form new military bodies to protect themselves, but once the threat is gone, the formations fall apart."

List of member groups

Core Army Structure

- 1st Corps
  - 1st Division
    - 111th Brigade (Northern Brigade)
    - 143rd Brigade (9th Division)
  - 2nd Division
    - 113th Brigade (component of Jaysh al-Ahfad)
    - 145th Brigade (Jaysh al-Nukhba-Northern Sector)
  - 13th Division
    - 131st Brigade (Sultan Mehmed the Conqueror Brigade)
    - 133rd Brigade (Al-Waqqas Brigade)
  - 14th Division
    - 141st Brigade (Sham Legion-Northern Sector)
    - 146th Brigade (Jaysh al-Sharqiya)
  - 15th Division
    - 123rd Brigade (Ahrar al-Sharqiya)
    - 144th Brigade (20th Division)
  - Muntasir Billah Division (unknown subdivision designation since the 13th division merger in May 2021)
- 2nd Corps
  - 19th Division (Nour al-Din al-Zenki Movement)
  - 21st Division (Sultan Murad Division)
    - 211th Brigade
    - 212th Brigade
    - 213th Brigade
  - 22nd Division (Hamza Division)
    - 221st Brigade
    - 222nd Brigade
    - 223rd Brigade (Kurdish Falcons Brigade)
  - 23rd Division (Al-Mu'tasim Brigade)
    - 231st Brigade
    - 232nd Brigade
    - 233rd Brigade (Men of War Brigade)
  - 24th Division (Sultan Murad Division)
    - 241st Brigade
    - 242nd Brigade
    - 243rd Brigade
  - 25th Division (Jaysh al-Islam)
    - 251st Brigade
    - 252nd Brigade
    - 253rd Brigade
    - 254th Brigade
    - 255th Brigade
    - 256th Brigade
    - 257th Brigade
  - 26th Division (Maghawir al-Sham)
    - Maghawir al-Sham-Ahrar al-Sham al-Shar’iya (Yousef al-Hamwi’s faction of Ahrar al-Sham)
    - Ahrar al-Sham Eastern Sector
  - 27th Division (Sultan Malek Shah Division)
    - 271st Brigade
    - 272nd Brigade
    - 273rd Brigade
  - Sultan Suleiman Shah Division
- 3rd Corps
  - 31st Division (Levant Front)
    - 311th Brigade (Northern Storm Brigade)
    - 312th Brigade (Ahrar Mennagh)
    - 313th Brigade (Emergency Force)
  - 33rd Division (Levant Front)
    - 331st Brigade
      - Fasa’il Mari‘a
      - Northern Knights Brigade
    - 333rd Brigade
      - Soldiers of Islam Brigade
      - Sword of the Levant Brigade (Azaz branch)
      - Conquest Brigade (left to join the Al Tawhid Brigade in December 2022, before rejoining the Levant Front in May 2023)
  - 34th Division
    - 341st Brigade (51st Division)
      - Sajidun Lillah Brigades (former Levant Front subgroup and component of the 333rd division, part of the 51st Division since October 2024)
      - Fifth Brigade (since October 2024)
    - 344th Brigade (Peace Brigade)
  - 36th Division (Glory Corps)
  - 37th Division
    - 112th Brigade (component of Jaysh al-Ahfad)
    - 121st Brigade (Samarkand Brigade)
- Unincorporated SNA factions in TONS
  - Special Forces Division
  - Suqour al-Sham Brigades-Eastern Sector (former component of the 32nd Division brigades, left to join the Liberation and Construction Movement)
  - Elite Brigade
  - Al-Rahman Legion (26th division designation reassigned to Maghawir al-Sham in 2024, current position in SNA structure unknown)
- National Front for Liberation
  - Sham Legion
  - Ahrar al-Sham
  - Jaysh al-Ahrar
  - Jaysh al-Nasr
  - Jaysh al-Nukhba
  - Jaysh al-Thani
  - 1st Infantry Division
  - Freedom Brigade
  - Damascus Gathering
  - Free Hayan Brigade
  - Freeman of the Levant Brigade
  - Central Division
  - Levant Revolutionaries Battalions
  - 60th Infantry Division (merger of the Free Idlib Army and 23rd Division)
  - Coastal Division (merger of the 1st Coastal Division and Second Coastal Division)
  - Suqour al-Sham-40th Division (offshoot of the Suqour al-Sham Brigades)

Military Blocs

- Hayat Thaeroon for Liberation
  - Sultan Murad Division
  - Al-Muntasir Billah Division
  - Sham Legion-Northern Sector
  - Levant Revolutionaries Battalions
  - Northern Brigade
  - 9th Special Forces Division of Aleppo
  - Mu'tasim Division
  - Special Forces Division
  - Al-Rahman Legion (from April 2022)
  - Sultan Malek Shah (from July 2022)
  - Al-Waqqas Brigade (from October 2022)
  - Hamza Division (left in July 2022)
  - Sultan Suleiman Shah Division (left in July 2022)
  - Elite Brigade (defected to TL in August 2022)
  - Ahrar al-Sham Eastern Sector (joined August 2022, left in February 2023)
  - 112th Brigade (component of Jaysh al-Ahfad, defected to the Renaissance and Liberation Movement (RLM) in June 2024)
  - Samarkand Brigade (joined October 2022, defected to RLM in June 2024)
  - Northern Falcons Brigade (left in October 2024)
- Third Legion
  - Levant Front
  - Jaysh al-Islam
  - 51st Division
  - Peace Brigade
  - Elite Brigade (from August 2022)
  - Sultan Malek Shah (defected to HTL in July 2022)
  - Glory Corps (defected to RLM in June 2024)
- Liberation and Construction Movement
  - Ahrar al-Sharqiya
  - 20th Division
  - Jaysh al-Sharqiya
  - Suqour al-Sham Brigades-Eastern Sector
- Joint Force
  - Hamza Division
  - Sultan Suleiman Shah Division
- Renaissance and Liberation Movement
  - 112th Brigade (component of Jaysh al-Ahfad)
  - Samarkand Brigade
  - Glory Corps

Military Councils

- Al-Bab Military Council
- Mare' Military Council
- Qabasin Military Council
- Akhtarin Military Council
- Menagh Military Council
- Tell Rifaat Military Council
- Deir ez-Zor Unified Military Council
- Raqqa Military Council

Operations Rooms

- Hawar Kilis Operations Room
- Dawn of Freedom Operations Room

Unknown Status

- Conqueror Lions Brigade (unknown status since February 2018)
- Resolute Storm Brigade (unknown status since February 2018)
- Hasakah Shield Brigade (unknown status since February 2018)
- Jaysh Ansar al-Allah (unknown status since February 2018)
- 5th Regiment (unknown status since October 2019)
- Anwar al-Hak Brigade (unknown since 2019)
- Mimati battalion (unknown since 2019)
- 1st Commandos Brigade (unknown status since October 2019)
- Authenticity and Development Front (semi-incorporated component of the 2nd Corps, unknown status since May 2020)
- Elite Division (semi-incorporated component of the 2nd Corps, unknown status since May 2020)
- Liwa Ansar al-Sunnah (semi-incorporated component of the 1st Corps, unknown status since May 2020)
- Ghazal base (132nd Brigade, unknown factional status since the 13th division merger between the Samarkand Brigade, Sultan Mehmed the Conqueror Brigade, and Al-Waqqas Brigade on May 28, 2021)
- Mustafa Regiment (component of the 342nd Brigade, unknown status since May 28, 2021)
- 1st Regiment (component of the 342nd Brigade, unknown status since May 28, 2021)

Former Army Components

- Former Corps/Legions
  - 4th Legion (2018)
    - Ahrar al-Sham (Homs branch)
    - Right Brigade
    - Several minor units
- Former Divisions
  - 11th Division (replaced by Division 1 and Division 2 in June 2021)
  - 32nd Division (Levant Front) (Ahrar al-Sham Eastern Sector/Suqour al-Sham Brigades-Eastern Sector, SSBES components separated to join the Liberation and Construction Movement in February of 2022, while the ASES [now representing the entire divion] components separated to rejoin Ahrar al Sham in June 2022)
  - 7th Division (Maghawir al-Sham-Ahrar al-Sham al-Shar’iya, offshoot of Ahrar al Sham, merged with Ahrar al-Sham Eastern Sector into the 26th division in June 2024)
- Former Brigades
  - 142nd Brigade (Sultan Suleiman Shah Brigade, promoted to a division in the Second Corps in May 2021)
  - 122nd Brigade (Muntasir Billah Division, unknown brigade status since the 13th division merger between the Samarkand Brigade, Sultan Mehmed the Conqueror Brigade, and Al-Waqqas Brigade on May 28, 2021)
  - 132nd Brigade (Ghazal base, unknown status since May 28, 2021)
  - 342nd Brigade (unknown status since May 28, 2021)
    - Mustafa Regiment
    - 1st Regiment
  - 332nd Brigade (Force 55, left to join Ahrar al-Tawhid in December 2022, before AT rejoined the Levant Front in April of 2024)
  - 343rd Brigade (Levant Front) (left to join Ahrar al-Tawhid in December 2022, before AT rejoined the Levant Front in April of 2024)
    - Sultan Othman Brigade
    - Island Revolutionaries
- Former unincorporated factions/brigade component factions
  - 23rd Division (Northern Aleppo branch, former component of the 344th Brigade, disbanded in August 2020)
  - Northern Falcons Brigade (former semi-incorporated component of the 2nd Corps, joined the Levant Front in October 2024 and dissolved 16 days later)

Former Military Blocs

- Azm Operations Room
- Syrian Front for Liberation (merged into Hayat Thaeroon for Liberation in August 2021)
  - Hamza Division
  - Mu'tasim Division
  - Special Forces Division
  - 20th Division (left in October 2021)
  - Northern Falcons Brigade (left in October 2021)
  - Sultan Suleiman Shah Division (left in November 2021)
- Thaeroon Movement (merged into Hayat Thaeroon for Liberation in August 2021)
  - Sultan Murad Division
  - Al-Muntasir Billah Division
  - Sham Legion (Northern Aleppo branch)
  - Sham Revolutionaries
  - Northern Brigade
  - 9th Special Forces Division of Aleppo
  - 112th Brigade (component of Jaysh al-Ahfad)
- Unified Force (dissolved in February 2024)
  - Levant Front
  - Mu'tasim Division
  - Al-Shahba Gathering
    - Ahrar al-Sham Eastern Sector
    - Nour al-Din al-Zenki Movement
    - Ahrar al-Tahwid
      - Conquest Brigade (left formation by May 2023)
      - Force 55
      - Island Revolutionaries
      - Sultan Othman Brigade
      - First Central
      - 5th Battalion
      - Azaz Falcons Brigade
      - Martyr Ibrahim Radwan Battalion
      - Masaab Abu az-Zuber Battalion
      - Muthanna Battalion

== Background ==
=== Connection with Turkey ===
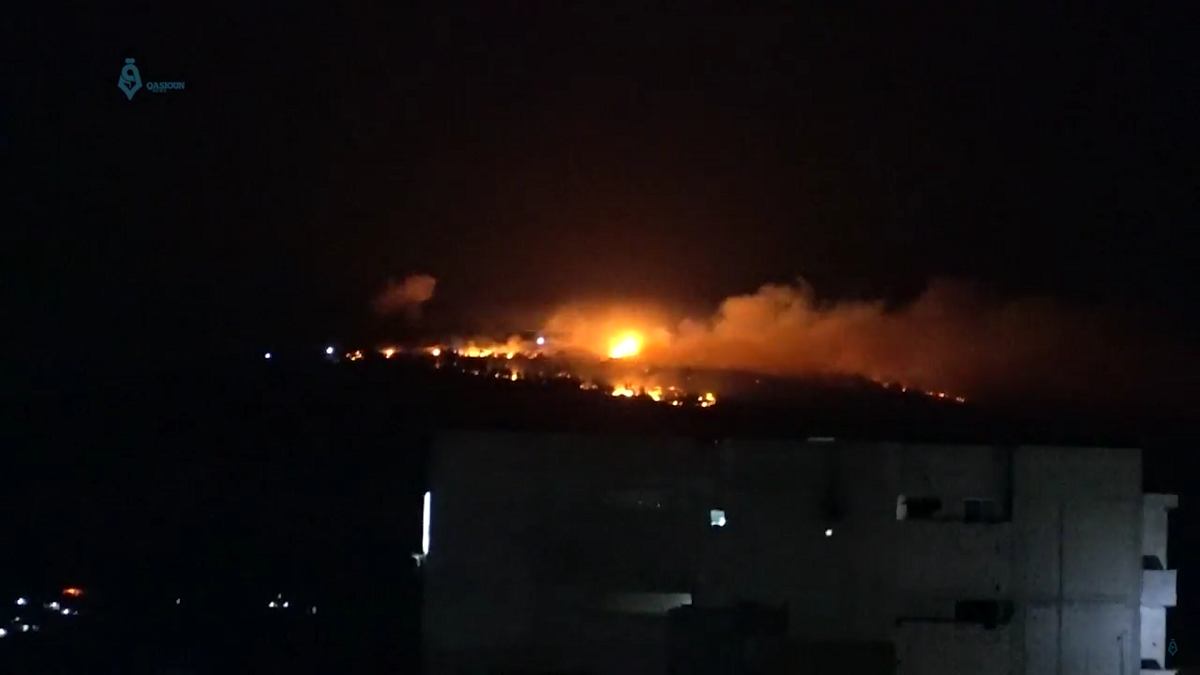
The Turkish Army bombards the SDF using heavy artillery in the northern Aleppo countryside in July 2017. The Turkish Armed Forces often directly support the SNA during military operations.

The Free Syrian Army (FSA) was the Syrian rebel faction most aligned with the Turkish state since the beginning of the Turkish involvement in the Syrian Civil War. For the FSA, Turkey was a sanctuary and a source of supplies. In the aftermath of the Kurdish–Turkish conflict restarting in 2015, the Turkish government became more influential throughout 2016, as other countries began to scale back their involvement and the rebel groups became more dependent on Turkish help. The Turkey-backed FSA's wages were paid for by the Turkish government, they operate alongside the Turkish Armed Forces. Injured Turkey-backed FSA troops have been treated in Turkey.

The Free Police have more overt connections to Turkey, reportedly wearing Turkish police uniforms decorated with the word "Polis" (Turkish for "Police"), while Special Forces wear distinctive light blue berets also worn by Turkish Gendarmerie. Some wore a Turkish flag patch on their uniforms at the inauguration ceremony on 24 January 2017.

On 18 April 2018, the Raqqa Military Council, which consists of 6 groups, was announced in the city of Urfa in southeastern Turkey.

== Operational history ==
=== 2016: Operation Euphrates Shield ===
The organization's first known engagement was a joint operation with the Turkish Armed Forces. In the first day, they took control of Jarabulus from ISIL. After this, they expanded northeast, meeting with units of the Syrian Democratic Forces north of Manbij. They successfully pushed the SDF out of the Jarablus area and captured all its settlements; the Euphrates river was used as a demarcation line, with forces on the opposing sides. On at least one occasion, American troops came to form a joint operation with Turkey; however after the TFSA's Ahrar al-Sharqiya Brigade's verbal attacks ("crusaders", "pigs") against them, the US troops withdrew, being escorted from the area by US-backed units in the TFSA, including the Hamza Division and the al-Mu'tasim Brigade. A U.S. defense official confirmed the event, but said that U.S. soldiers were still deployed in the area. The joint forces pushed ISIL to the south. After this success, Turkey-backed FSA made contact near Mare with the SDF forces from the Afrin Canton. Contact between the two saw the group attack some SDF-held towns with Turkish artillery support. The attacks were repelled, with casualties on both sides.

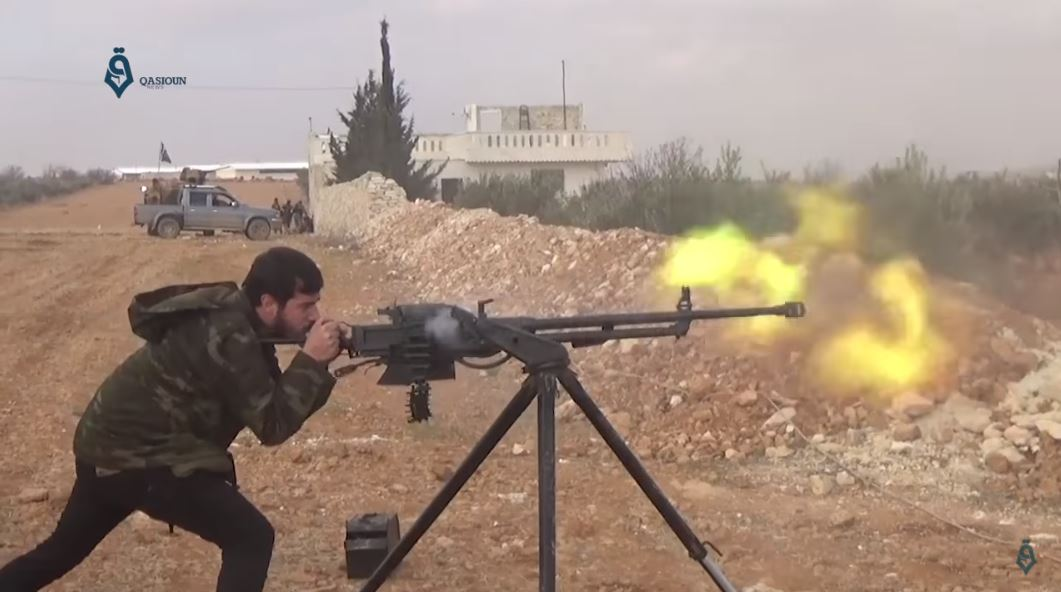
Rebel fighter opening fire with a machine gun during the Battle of al-Bab, 14 December 2016.

In February 2017, the Turkish-backed Free Syrian Army and the Turkish Armed Forces advanced to besiege al-Bab. By 27 February, the group and Turkish Armed Forces seized al-Bab. As of February 2017, 470 fighters of the Turkish-backed Free Syrian Army died in Operation Euphrates Shield, while the Turkish armed forces lost 68.

As of March 2017, the TFSA and the Turkish army were effectively blocked from moving further east by advances of the SAA. This occurred when the SDF's Manbij Military Council handed over some territory bordering the Turkish positions to the SAA, creating a buffer zone. As a result, the TFSA failed to achieve other stated goals, including capturing the SDF-held city of Manbij and participating in the Coalition offensive on Raqqa.

On 24 September 2017, the Hamza Division announced the opening of a military academy in the city of al-Bab. According to Abdullah Halawa, military commander of the group, 2,200 fighters will undergo two months of training in the academy, with the goal of forming a "Syrian National Army" in northern Syria.

=== 2018: Operation Olive Branch ===
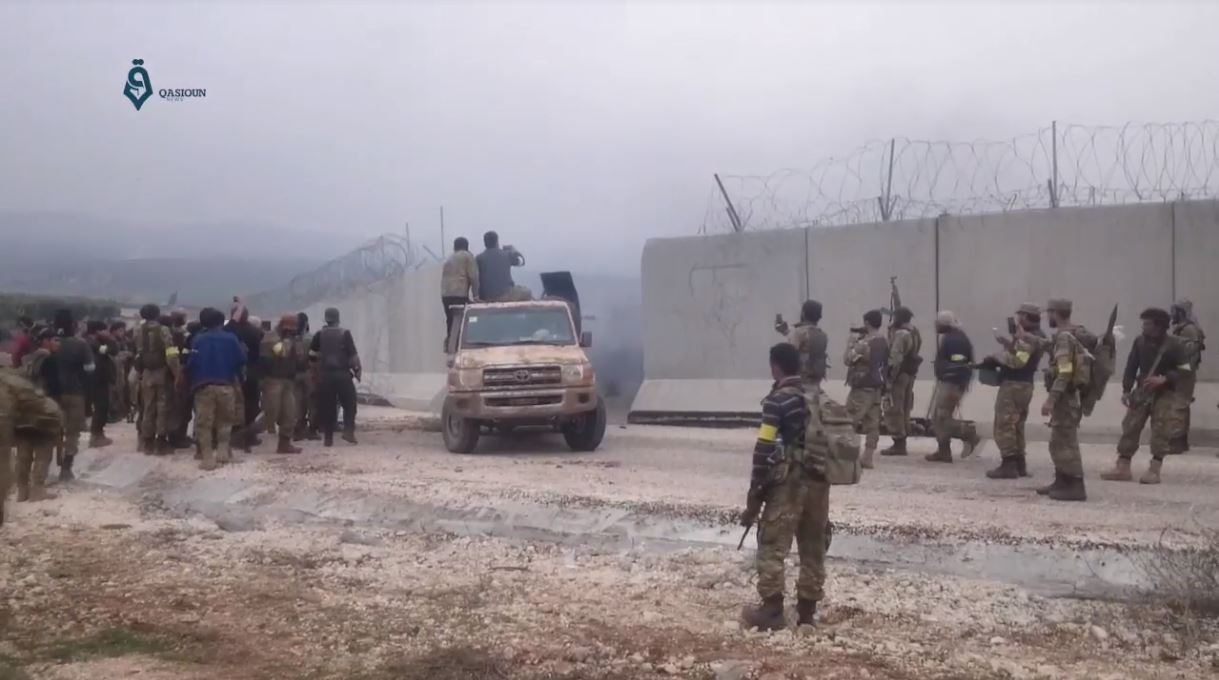
Syrian National Army fighters near Jandiris district northern Aleppo's countryside, 11 February 2018

On 20 January 2018, Turkey launched a new operation in Afrin Region, against the Kurdish-led Democratic Union Party (PYD) in Syria. The SNA conducted ground offensives against the YPG and SDF supported by and in conjunction with Turkish armed forces (TAF/TSK) air strikes, artillery, armored units, and special forces units. The first phase of the operation was to capture the entire Afrin-Turkey border. On 1 February, the SNA captured the strategic town of Bulbul after a fierce battle with the Kurdish-led People's Protection Units (YPG). In early March, the second phase of Operation Olive Branch was launched after successfully clearing the entire Afrin-Turkey border. On 3 March, after fierce fighting, the SNA captured the town of Rajo. On 8 March, the SNA captured Jinderes, meaning that they now have control over all major roads leading to the city of Afrin. On 13 March, SNA forces reached Afrin city and encircled it. On 18 March, the SNA took full control of Afrin, marking their second big victory after Operation Euphrates Shield. Since the capture of Afrin city, SNA forces have been busy clearing the recently captured areas of mines and providing security and stability to the region. As of 13 June SNA forces have dismantled 240 mines and 1,231 IEDs.

=== 2019: Operation Dawn of Idlib and Operation Peace Spring ===
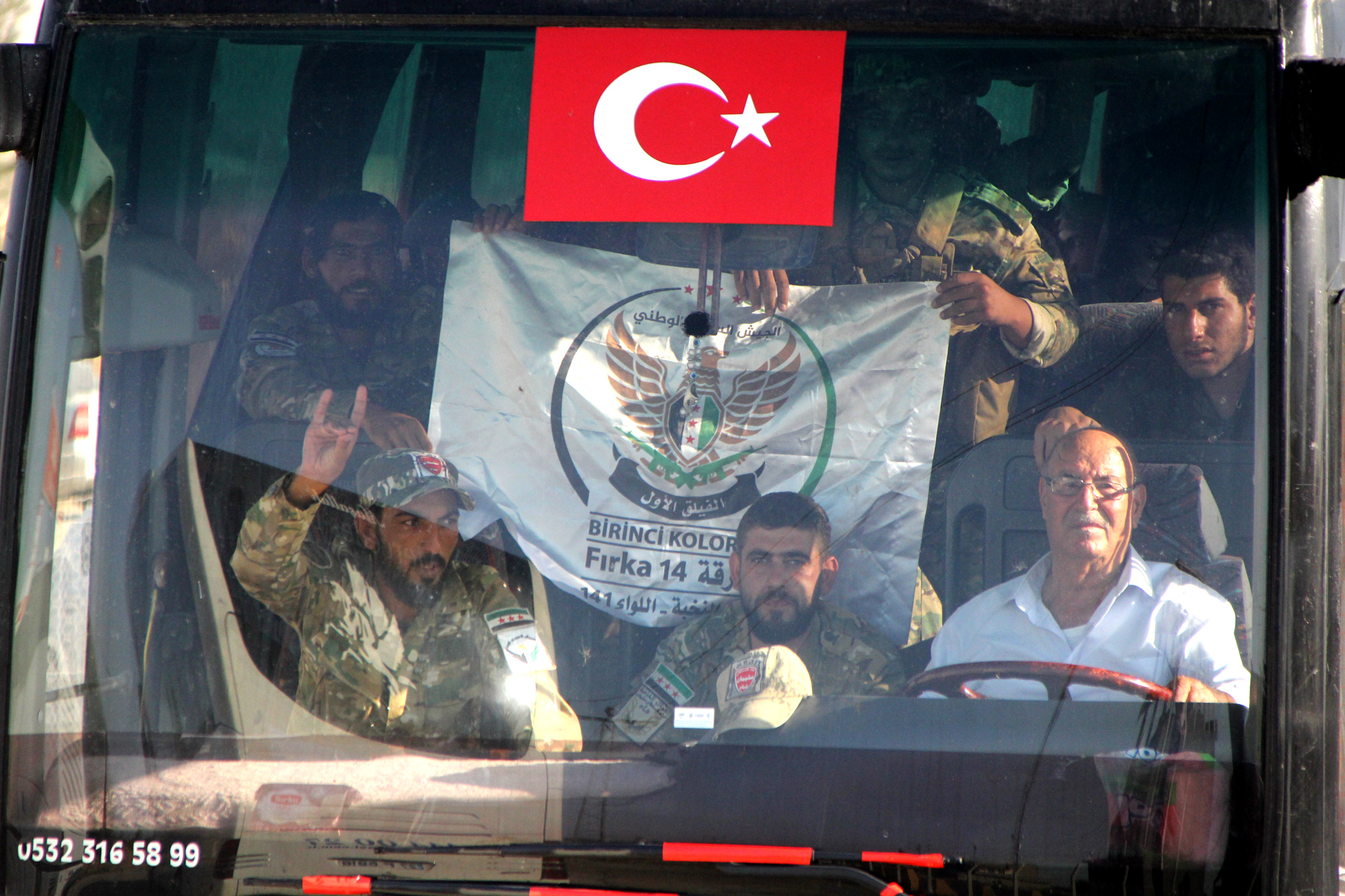
Syrian National Army fighters on 12 October 2019

By 16 August, the SNA sent considerable reinforcements to the frontlines of Hama and Idlib, where the Syrian Arab Army was launching an offensive against HTS and various rebel groups. Following this, rebel forces launched another heavy attack on the government-held village of Sukayk.

On 9 October 2019, Turkish Armed Forces, together with the Syrian National Army, had launched what they called Operation Peace Spring against SDF to eradicate what Turkish President Erdogan called "the threat of terror" against Turkey. On 13 October, Peace Spring forces captured the border town of tal Abyad. After the conclusion of the Second Battle of Ras al-Ayn on 20 October, SDF fighters retreated from the border town of Ras al Ain during the cease fire, which was brokered by the United States and Turkey. On 25 November, the operation was completed, after securing the territories between Ras al Ayn and Tal Abyad.

=== 2024: Operation Dawn of Freedom ===
In December 2024, the Syrian National Army advanced eastward during the opposition offensives, seizing areas such as Manbij from the Syrian Democratic Forces.

== Operations outside Syria ==
=== Libya ===
Since 2020, Turkey has been hiring and transporting fighters from the Syrian National Army to support and bolster the manpower of the Libyan GNA. Several SNA member groups volunteered for the operation despite strong objections of the Syrian Interim Government. Up to 481 have died in combat.

=== Azerbaijan ===
In September 2020, Turkey deployed 2,580 fighters from the Syrian National Army to fight in Nagorno-Karabakh, where according to SOHR, up to 541 have died in combat.

=== Niger ===
In January 2024, the Syrian Observatory for Human Rights reported that Turkey had deployed SNA fighters to participate in the anti-ISIS campaign in Niger. By May 2024, an additional 250 members of the SNA's Sultan Murad Division had been dispatched to Niger by Turkey's National Intelligence Organization.

=== Iraq ===
In July 2024, the Syrian Observatory for Human Rights reported that Turkey had deployed SNA fighters to participate in the Turkish-PKK conflict in Northern Iraq. According to SOHR sources, the number of Syrian fighters expected to join this mission was estimated to be nearly 400 mercenaries from the Sultan Suleiman Shah Division, the Al-Hamzah Division and the Sultan Murad Division. According to the sources, some SNA fighters have been captured by the "Kurdistan Workers' Party".

== Internal conflict ==
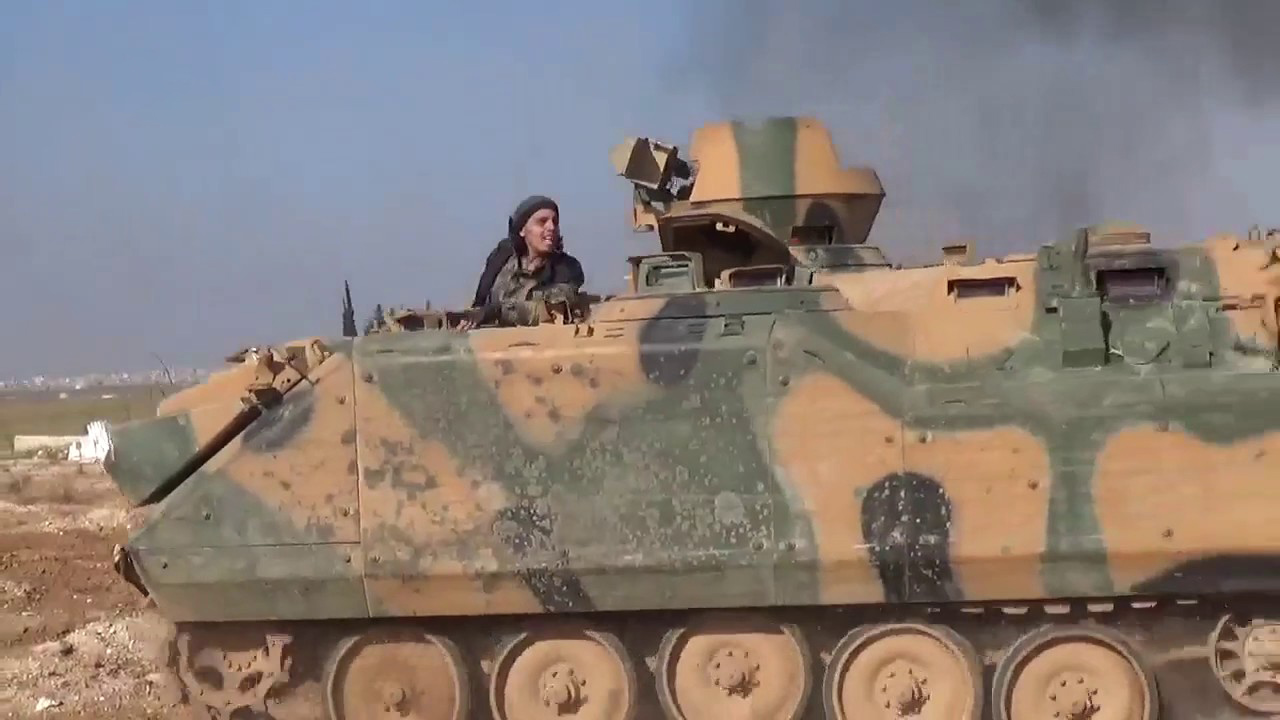
Turkish-supplied FNSS ACV-15, manned by a SNA crew, during operations against the Islamic State of Iraq and the Levant.

On 26 March 2016, Ahrar ash-Sham ordered the anti-YPG Kurdish FSA group Liwa Ahfad Saladin to remove the flag of Kurdistan from their posts and threatened military action if they did not. However, Liwa Ahfad Saladin's commander denied the incident ever occurred and stated Ahrar ash-Sham to be its ally.

On 27 September 2016, several Ahrar al-Sham fighters publicly burned a FSA flag in Azaz. The Ahrar al-Sham spokesman denied involvement and the incident sparked pro-FSA demonstrations in the city.

On 14 November 2016, the Levant Front and the Sultan Murad Division clashed at the Azaz border gate with Kilis, Turkey. Ahrar al-Sham and the Nour al-Din al-Zenki Movement, a former member of the Levant Front, joined the fighting after they said the Levant Front leaders was "acting like gangs".

On 3 April 2017, Ahrar al-Sham reportedly attacked Liwa Ahfad Saladin in Qabasin and captured more than 8 of their fighters, including a commander. Hours later, the prisoners were released after negotiations, although tensions between the two groups remain.

On 13 April 2017, clashes broke out between the Levant Front and the Sultan Suleyman Shah Brigade 100 kilometers north of Aleppo after both groups said the other was committing corruption. The Sultan Murad Division, the Hamza Division, and the Northern Hawks Brigade sided with the Sultan Suleyman Shah Brigade during the clashes.

On 14 May 2017, two separate clashes in Jarabulus and Gandura pitted the Ahrar al-Sharqiya Brigade against the Sultan Murad Division and the Sham Legion. The fighting stopped after the intervention of the Turkish Army.

On 22 May, the Levant Front attacked the Sham Legion near Azaz. The Levant Front said the Sham Legion was conspiring with the Nour al-Din al-Zenki Movement, part of Tahrir al-Sham. The LF besieged the Sham Legion headquarters, captured a number of their fighters, and seized several ammunition dumps.

Between 24 and 25 May 5 FSA factions including the Levant Front, the Hamza Division, and the Sultan Murad Division conducted a joint attack on the Revolutionary Knights Brigade between Azaz and al-Rai and captured more than 20 of their fighters, in addition to killing and wounding at least 10. The FSA factions said the Revolutionary Knights Brigade was affiliated to the Nour al-Din al-Zenki Movement and Tahrir al-Sham and partaking in smuggling, looting, extortion, and abuses of civilians.

Between 4 and 15 June, heavy fighting broke out between TFSA factions led by the Sultan Murad Division and Ahrar al-Sham and its allies in and near al-Bab. By 15 June 33 people were killed and 55 injured in the infighting. On 8 June, between 60 and 70 TFSA fighters, including several Sultan Murad Division commanders, defected to the Syrian Army and the Syrian Democratic Forces during the clashes.

On 3 July 2017, Mahmoud Khallo, commander of the Descendants of Saladin Brigade, declared that his unit would not participate in a planned Turkish-led offensive against the YPG and SDF in the Afrin District and the Shahba region. Following the announcement, the group was attacked by multiple Turkish-backed groups, which captured the group's positions and warehouses with vehicles and equipment. On 14 July, Khallo himself was captured by the Levant Front, which said he was affiliated with both al-Qaeda and the Democratic Union Party (PYD), and was tortured. The Levant Front then handed him over to Turkish security forces, who interrogated him. After being released soon after, Khallo protested against his unit's treatment and criticized that "Turkey was apparently only interested in using the Syrian militias to further its own strategic goals". He also said that Liwa Ahfad Saladin, now without weapons, would set up a political party.

On 25 March 2018, following the capture of Afrin a week earlier, clashes broke out between the Hamza Division and Ahrar al-Sharqiya in the city, resulting in the latter group capturing around 200 fighters from the former. A ceasefire agreement between the two groups was signed on the same day under the auspices of Turkey.

On 18 November 2018, at least 25 militants were killed and dozens wounded in heavy clashes between Turkish-backed insurgent factions in the northwestern Syrian city of Afrin. The clashes primarily occurred in the Mahmudiya and Villat neighborhoods, killing 14 fighters from Ahrar al-Sharqiya and nine from the other groups.

== Reported war crimes ==
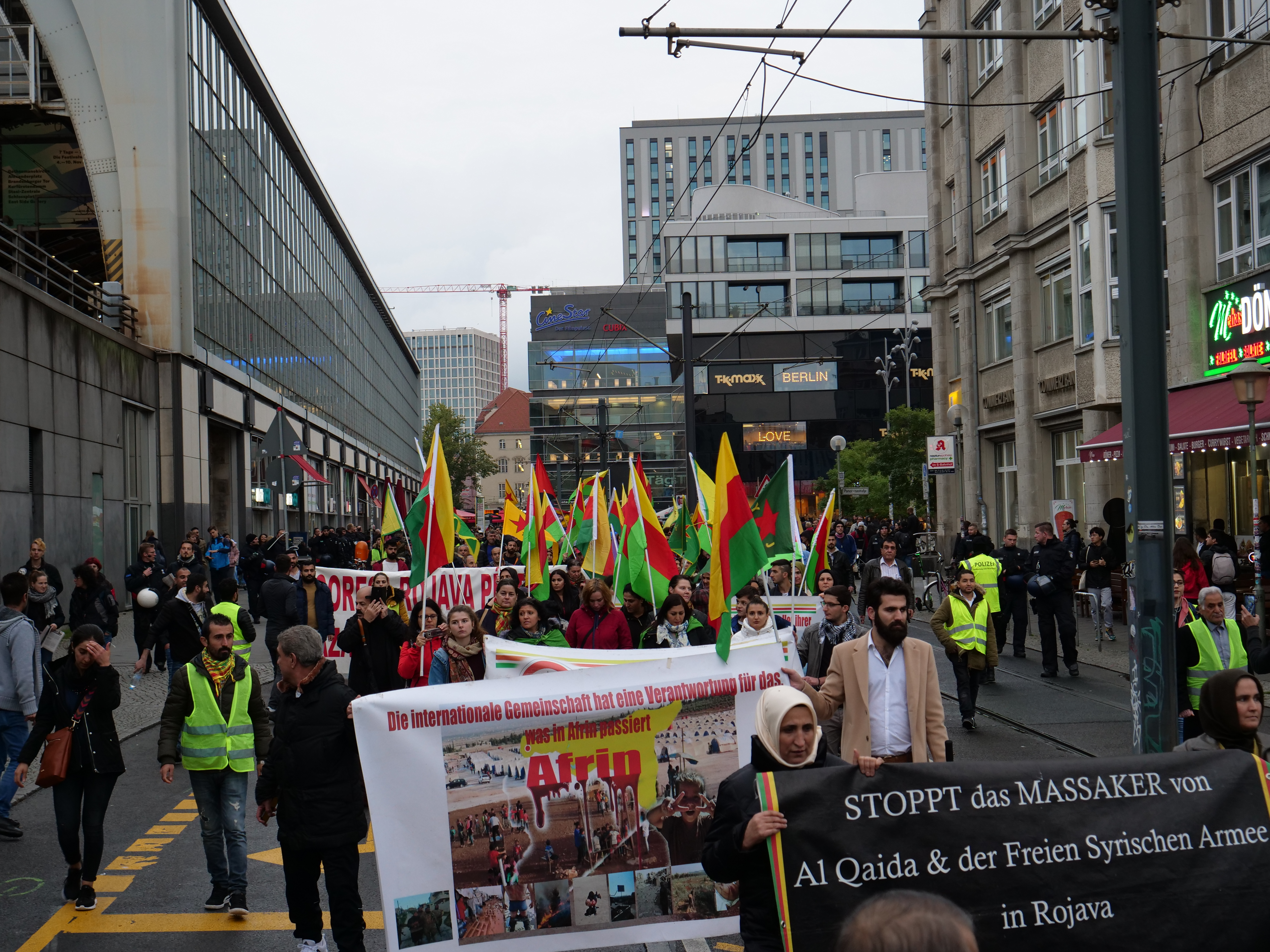
SDF supporters protesting in Berlin on 8 October 2019 against the Turkish offensive into north-eastern Syria.

=== War crimes in the "Olive Branch areas" ===
Following the capture of Afrin by the Turkish Armed Forces and allied Syrian National Army factions, approximately 310,000 civilians were displaced from the region. Over the subsequent six years of control, the Syrian Observatory for Human Rights (SOHR) documented thousands of human rights violations by SNA fighters against civilians in the Afrin region, with Kurdish residents reported to be disproportionately affected. These violations included: 8,729 cases of kidnapping or arrest of Kurdish civilians, of whom at least 1,123 were reported to remain in detention as of March 2024; 1,246 cases of seizure of houses, shops, and farmland; 449 incidents involving the sale of property belonging to displaced residents; 734 instances of levies imposed on civilians; 1,101 cases of the cutting of fruit-bearing trees, especially Afrin's olive trees; and 456 incidents in which civilians were assaulted by SNA fighters. SOHR also reported the destruction of Kurdish cultural symbols, including the statue of the Kurdish mythological figure Kaveh the Blacksmith; obstruction of Kurdish cultural events like Newroz; a number of extrajudicial executions and torture murder in SNA-run prisons; the construction of new residential complexes and assisting in the settlement of displaced people from other parts of Syria, as well as Palestinian refugees, which the watchdog described as contributing to demographic change favoring Arabs.

On 19 April 2018, The Independent stated that Turkish-backed SNA forces were forcibly converting Yazidis to Islam and destroying Yazidi places of worship after having captured their villages.

On 3 October 2018, the Glory Corps attempted to seize 4 houses inhabited by displaced families from Arbin in Afrin city to use as headquarters, but were stopped by the Sultan Murad Division and the military police, the SOHR reported.

On 27 January 2019, Glory Corps and Sham Legion fighters kidnapped a doctor from his clinic in Afrin and tortured him, as they accused him of being a "member of the Democratic Union Party" (PYD); the Sham Legion denied that its fighters were involved.

In the aftermath of the 2023 Turkey–Syria earthquakes, Syrian for Truth and Justice reported multiple violations by the Syrian National Army during and after the humanitarian response. These included discriminatory search-and-rescue practices, obstruction of life-saving aid, impeding cross-line aid to affected communities, unequal distribution of assistance, confiscation and diversion of aid, and profiteering. The watchdog also documented concurrent violations of housing, land, and property rights linked to the aid response.

A July 2023 investigation by Syria Direct reported that in Afrin, homes and properties of displaced original residents are being illegally sold through Facebook and WhatsApp at prices well below market value, often by SNA factions or by civilians who acquired them from these groups.

On the eve of 20 March 2023, the SNA-affiliated Jaysh al-Sharqiya group attacked Kurds, when they lighted a fire in celebration of Newroz, in Jindires, killing four, injuring another person seriously and two lightly. This incident was documented by various Human rights organisations, including Syrian for Truth and Justice and Human Rights Watch. The attack was condemned by US Embassy in Syria.

In January 2024, the European Center for Constitutional and Human Rights (ECCHR) and Syrians for Truth and Justice filed a criminal complaint with the German Federal Public Prosecutor’s Office, requesting an investigation into violations of international law by SNA factions in Afrin since 2018.

=== War crimes in the "Peace Spring areas" ===
After the Turkish Army and the SNA captured the border town of Tell Abyad, Ras-al Ayn and their surroundings from the Syrian Democratic Forces (SDF) in October 2019, over 200,000 of the area’s residents fled as a result, according to Human Rights Watch.

In one instance of a violation committed by the SNA in the "Peace Spring areas," affiliated Glory Corps fighters reportedly kidnapped several young men from Bîr Atwan village, west of Tell Abyad, and beat and humiliated them.

In one widely reported incident, Kurdish politician Hevrin Khalaf was killed near the M4 Motorway south of Tell Abyad by fighters from the SNA-affiliated Ahrar al-Sharqiya group, on 12 October 2019. Her death was later confirmed by the SOHR. Several major world news channels like The Guardian, New York Times and the BBC reported on the murder, with The Washington Post stating that Khalaf's death at the hands of SNA fighters "almost certainly constitute(d) a war crime, under international law." The SOHR further reported that at least 8 more civilians had been executed by SNA forces in the incident. The SNA denied responsibility for the murder, however independent investigations by the BBC and bellingcat "uncovered compelling evidence", that Khalaf was indeed killed by SNA fighters.

On 22 October 2019, fighters from the group trampled and mutilated the body of what appeared to be a Women's Protection Units (YPJ) fighter they killed in the countryside near Kobanî, laughing while they did so.

=== War crimes in other areas ===
In September 2016, Sultan Murad Division fighters published pictures of themselves torturing four YPG prisoners of war, after capturing the town of Jarabulus.

In June 2017, the Kurdish National Council (ENKS) said that Turkish-backed SNA rebels kidnapped 55 Kurdish civilians and displaced hundreds of Yazidis in the "Euphrates Shield areas."

On 11 December 2024, SNA fighters were accused of executing wounded and unarmed SDF fighters receiving treatment in a hospital, after the capture of Manbij, The Telegraph reported. A video circulated online showing wounded men lying in hospital beds, connected to medical equipment, being questioned by individuals in military attire before being shot. Furthermore, Kurdish channels said SNA-affiliated factions also looted homes, burned them down and killed several civilians in the city.

=== UN's International Independent Commission on Syria ===
On 15 September 2020, a report by the investigators of the United Nations' International Independent Commission on Syria denounced the atrocities committed against Kurds by Syrian National Army forces, which include: torture, rape, murder, systematic looting, hostage-taking, forced displacement, forced appropriation of civilian property, arbitrary detentions, kidnappings, indiscriminate shelling and rocket attacks, as well as killing and maiming "scores of civilians" through the use of improvised explosive devices (IED).

=== Human Rights Watch ===
In a 2024 report, Human Rights Watch (HRW) documented severe human rights violations committed by SNA factions, most of which occurred in the Kurdish-majority region of Afrin. The report cited testimony from an Afrin native, who stated:

"I had never seen anything like it. First, they (SNA fighters) came for money, cars, gold and jewelry, taking everything they could. Then they emptied the shops, then the homes. They wrote on the walls of our homes which faction owned which house."

— Abu Salem, 63-year-old Afrin native

According to HRW, SNA factions committed various violations in the Turkish occupation of northern Syria during and after military operations by: indiscriminately shelling civilian areas, carrying out summary killings, occupying private civilian homes and shops and looting the owners’ properties, charging unauthorized taxes, engaging in protection racketeering and extortion, carrying out kidnappings for ransom, as well as seizing and profiting from the civilian populations’ properties, agricultural lands, and businesses. Furthermore, HRW reported that SNA factions have frequently arrested Syrian nationals and unlawfully transferred them to Turkey for prosecution, a practice prohibited under the law of occupation "regardless of motive."

HRW also reported on several unresolved deaths in SNA detention, including those of Rezan Khalil, a civilian, in January 2022; Abdulrazaq al-Nuaimi, an internally displaced person from Hama Province, in February 2022; Luqman Hannan, a Kurdish lawyer and activist, in December 2022; and Basel Jakish, a Kurdish civilian, in May 2023.

Human Rights Watch argued that many of these acts are prohibited under the laws of war and may constitute war crimes.

In a 2025 report, HRW documented severe human rights violations committed by SNA factions around the fall of the Assad regime. On 3 December, SNA forces raided the home of a Shahba resident and her family, detaining her 42-year-old husband, a construction worker, without providing an explanation. She later testified:

"They had forcibly removed his fingernails, toenails and teeth, and he had burn marks on his feet … He (another relative) told me Turkish intelligence forces and the SNA’s Military Police tortured him in Maarata Prison and forced him to confess that he was building tunnels for the SDF. Then they took him to the hospital and left him there. A few days after he came home, he suffered a stroke and can no longer speak at all."

— Shahba resident

Between December 2024 and January 2025, SNA fighters detained nine residents of a village in Afrin region, accusing them of not paying taxes and demanding up to $3,800 each for their release.

HRW verified drone footage, obtained from SNA-affiliated Telegram channels and published on 22 January 2025 during the East Aleppo Offensive, documenting "apparent war crimes." The footage showed two small air-dropped munitions, falling from an SNA-operated drone, and exploding in a crowd of unarmed civilians performing a traditional Kurdish dance during the 2025 Tishrin Dam protests. The accompanying caption stated: “The armed drone sends congratulations and blessings to the SDF celebrations at Tishreen Dam.” On the same day another attack by SNA forces hit a Kurdish Red Crescent ambulance transporting a civilian wounded by the earlier drone strike. In total SNA attacks that day killed 6 civilians, including the well-known Kurdish actor Bavê Teyar, and injured at least 16 more.

=== Child soldiers ===
The US Department of State's 2023 Trafficking in Persons Report mentioned that factions of the Syrian National Army recruited and used Syrian children as child soldiers in Libya.

The United Nations’ April 2021 report on children and armed conflict in Syria, covering 1 July 2018 to 30 June 2020, found that at least 1,306 boys and 117 girls were recruited by armed groups across the country. Of these, at least 394 children were recruited by groups affiliated with the Syrian National Army. A fighter of the SNA's Sultan Murad Division confirmed to Syrian for Truth and Justice that there were 21 children under the age of 18 at a military camp near Azaz alone.

=== Sanctions ===
In July 2021, the U.S. Department of the Treasury sanctioned the SNA's Ahrar al-Sharqiya and two of its leaders for “crimes against civilians, particularly Syrian Kurds, including unlawful killings, abductions, torture, and seizures of private property,” as well as for recruiting former Islamic State (ISIS) members.

Mohammed al-Jassem (nom de guerre: Abu Amsha), who was a general within the SNA until his appointment as commander of the 62nd Division, was put under sanctions by the U.S. Department of the Treasury for having engaged in abductions, extortion, forced displacement, harassment and property confiscation, particularly targeting the Kurds of Afrin. On 28 May 2025, the Council of the European Union sanctioned him and the SNA for his involvement in the 2025 massacres of Syrian Alawites.

Sayf Bulad, who commanded the SNA's Hamza Division, is under U.S. sanctions for crimes against humanity, including kidnapping, torture, sexual abuse and extortion.
