= Ronahî TV =

Kurdish-language Syrian television channel

- Country: Syria
- Broadcast area: Syria; Kurdistan; Worldwide (via internet)
- Headquarters: Qamishli

Programming
- Languages: Kurdish, Arabic, English

History
- Launched: October 20, 2011

Links
- Webcast: Ronahi TV Live Stream
- Website: ronahi.tv

Ronahî TV is a private Kurdish-language television channel based in Qamishli, Syria. Established in late 2011, it is regarded as the first Kurdish television channel founded by Kurds in Syria. The network focuses on news, cultural programming, and issues related to Kurdish communities worldwide.

Ronahî TV broadcasts primarily in Kurdish, and also provides content in Arabic and English. The channel operates through the collective efforts of approximately 250 volunteers. In addition to its headquarters in Qamishli, it maintains reporting teams in Kobani and Afrin, and broadcasts from studios in Syria and several European Union countries.

== History ==
On 14 April 2017, Eutelsat announced its intention to remove Ronahî TV's ability to broadcast, stating that the channel had aired statements by members of the Kurdistan Communities Union (KCK) and the Kurdistan Workers' Party (PKK), which is designated as a terrorist organization by Turkey and several other Western states.

The European Federation of Journalists (EFJ) alleged that Eutelsat's decision followed pressure from the Turkish Radio and Television Supreme Council (RTÜK) to discontinue the channel's broadcasts.

=== Syrian civil war ===
Several Ronahî TV-employed journalists have died or been wounded in the Syrian civil war, among them are:

- Mustefa Mihemed, who died from injuries related to a mine explosion on 13 July 2016
- Kendal Cudi, who was injured in the same mine explosion as Mustefa
- Zekeriya Şêxo, who was wounded in the Turkish military operation in Afrin
