= Nuri Mahmoud =

Syrian politician (born 1977)

- نوري محمود

Speaker of the YPG
- Incumbent
- Assumed office 2017–2026
- Parliamentary group: YPG (until 2026)

Commander of the SDF Headquarters
- Incumbent
- Assumed office 2020–2026

Advisor in the Civic Council of Kobanî
- In office 2013–2015

Director of Semalka Border Crossing
- In office 2015–2017

Personal details
- Born: 13 August 1977 (age 49) Qamishli, Syria
- Party: Democratic Union Party (PYD)
- Other political affiliations: Kurdish National Congress (KNK)
- Education: Kurdistan Region of Iraq (Emigrated there for further education)
- Profession: Politician, military officer

Military service
- Commands: SDF, YPG, Syrian Army

Nuri Mahmoud (born 13 August 1977, Syria) is a former politician of the Kurdish National Congress (KNK) and Democratic Union Party (PYD) and current military officer and speaker of the Peoples' Defense Units (YPG).

== Early life and education ==
He was born to a Syrian Kurdish family in Qamishli in August 1977. He attended high school where he was politically active. Therefore, he was not permitted to study further in Syria following which he emigrated to the Kurdistan Region of Iraq. There he worked for the Kurdish National Congress (KNK) between 2007 and 2011. Between 2012 and 2013, he served as a member of the executive committee of the Democratic Union Party (PYD).

== Political and military career ==
In 2013 he was appointed to the position of an advisor in the process of establishing a legislative council and a judiciary by the civic council of Kobanî. Following he held several positions in the Kobanî Canton until 2015. From 2015 and 2017, Mahmoud served as the director of the Semalka border crossing between the Kurdistan Region in Iraq and Syria. In 2017 he was appointed as the speaker of the YPG and in 2020 also as a commander of the headquarters of the Syrian Democratic Forces (SDF). As the spokesperson of the YPG and in support of a UN resolution, he stressed that the YPG would hold a ceasefire of 30 days during the Turkish invasion of Afrin in February 2018. In June 2020, he offered an apology to the ENKS for the deaths caused by the forces of the YPG. In 2022, he voiced concern over an eventual Turkish attack onto Northern Syria.

=== Foreign relations ===
In March 2023, he visited the French Senate within a delegation of the Autonomous Administration of North and East Syria (AANES) where met with its vice-president Pierre Laurent. Mahmoud was also honored by the French Senate for his service during the fight against the Islamic State.
