= Manbij offensive (2024) =

Pro-Turkish forces operation against Kurdish forces in Syria

- Part of Operation Dawn of Freedom, the Turkish–Syrian National Army offensive in Northern Syria (2024–2025) and the Turkish involvement in the Syrian civil war
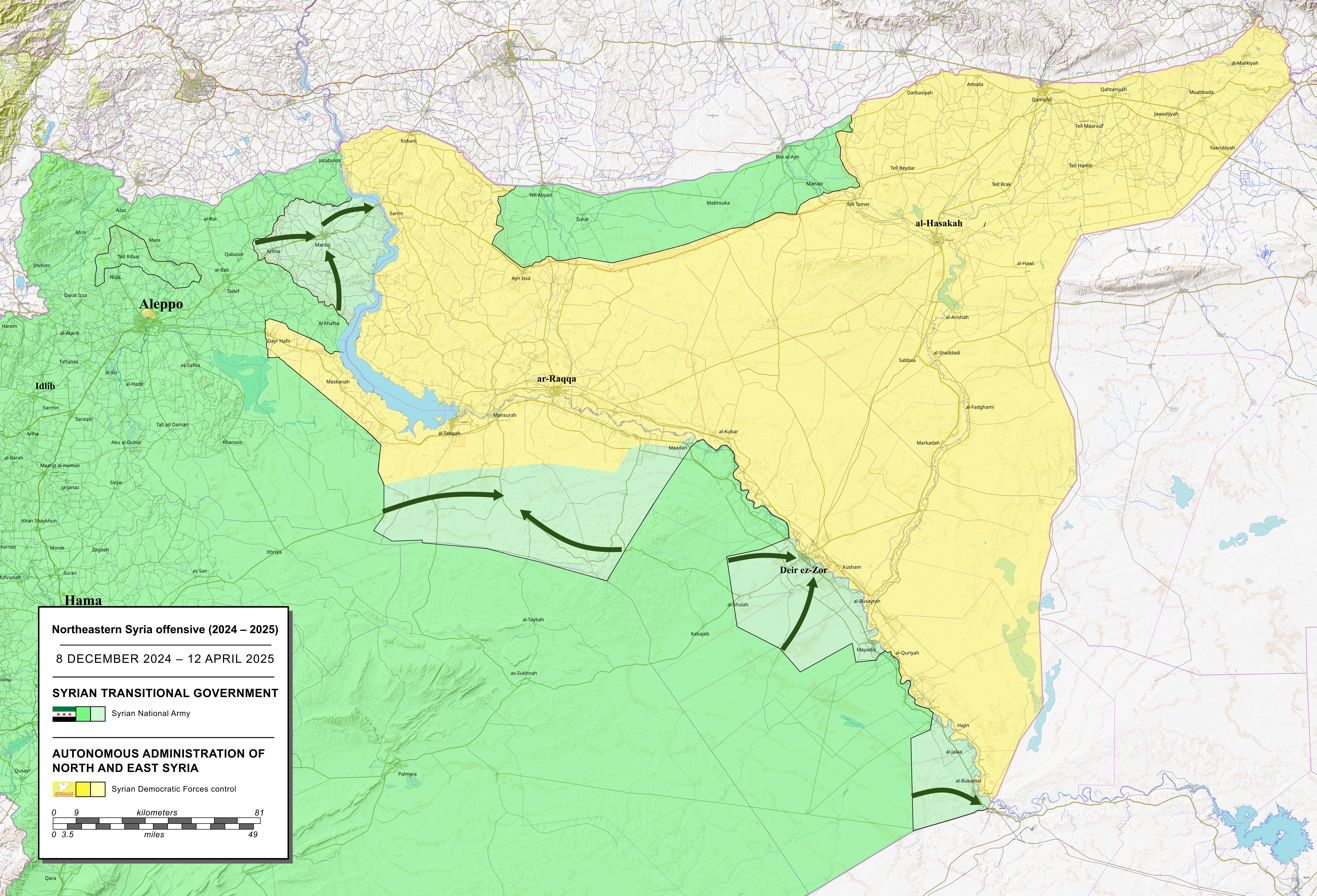
- Controlled by the Syrian Interim Government Controlled by the Autonomous Administration of North and East Syria
Date	6–11 December 2024 (5 days)
Location	Manbij District in Aleppo Governorate, Syria
Result	SNA–Turkish victory; SNA captures Manbij city and all of the disputed territory; SNA offensive on the Tishrin Dam; SDF counteroffensive

Belligerents
(Syrian opposition) Syrian Interim Government; Turkey	Autonomous Administration of North and East Syria; Manbij Region

Units involved
(Syrian opposition) Syrian National Army; (Syrian opposition) Dawn of Freedom Operations Room; Sultan Murad Division; Levant Front; Maghawir al-Sham; Sultan Suleiman Shah Brigade; (Turkey) Turkish Armed Forces; Turkish Air Force	Syrian Democratic Forces; Manbij Military Council; Tabqa Military Council; Sireen Military Council; Asayish; Self-Defense Forces; Anti-Terror Units; Martyr Haroun Units

Casualties and losses
(Syrian opposition) 60 killed (Note: 24 killed on 8 December, 6 killed on 9 December, 30 killed on 10 December) (Syrian opposition) Dozens killed or injured (SDF claim) (Syrian opposition) 14 captured (SDF claim) (Syrian opposition) 3 vehicles destroyed (SDF claim)	112 killed (Note: Three killed on 7 December, 35 killed on 8–9 December, 68 killed on 10 December, six killed on 11 December); Tens of wounded fighters executed by SNA; 3 injured
- 37 civilians killed by SNA and Turkish Armed Forces; 3 civilians executed by SNA in revenge operations Several civilians displaced

The Manbij offensive was a military campaign launched by the pro-Turkish Syrian National Army (SNA) and the Turkish Air Force against Syrian Democratic Forces positions in Manbij lasting from 6 to 11 December 2024. It was a part of Operation Dawn of Freedom in the Turkish–Syrian National Army offensive in Northern Syria (2024–2025), and occurred concurrently with the Deir ez-Zor offensive and the wider Syrian opposition offensives. The SDF withdrew their troops on 12 December after five days of conflict following a US-brokered ceasefire agreement.

== Background ==
Following the capture of Tell Rifaat, the Turkish-backed Syrian National Army (SNA) announced a military campaign targeting Manbij, a strategic city in the eastern Aleppo countryside. This offensive held particular significance as Manbij represented the final Syrian Democratic Forces (SDF)-controlled territory west of the Euphrates River, where the group maintained its presence with U.S. military support. The opposition's military operations occurred as part of Operation Dawn of Freedom simultaneously with Operation Deterrence of Aggression, which advanced from Idlib toward Homs.

The Dawn of Freedom operations room, a component of the SNA, articulated that while their primary objective remained the removal of the Assad government, they were compelled to engage the SDF due to what they characterized as attacks on opposition-held villages in the Aleppo countryside. The operations room issued civilian safety advisories for Manbij residents, requesting they maintain distance from military installations.

Turkish authorities reportedly rejected Russian-mediated communication attempts with the SDF, maintaining their position that the group represented a Syrian extension of the Kurdistan Workers' Party (PKK). Prior to the offensive, Turkey had issued military ultimatums to the SDF demanding their withdrawal east of the Euphrates River, which the SDF declined to accept.

On 4 December 2024, SDF reported clashes in Dayr Hafir and in the southern Manbij region and confirmed casualties among the SNA.

Military analysts stated that the offensive aligned with Turkish initiatives to establish a security corridor along Syria's northern border. This strategic plan aimed to create a 30-kilometer deep buffer zone in territories controlled by the U.S.-backed Syrian Democratic Forces (SDF). Turkish President Recep Tayyip Erdogan had emphasized the operation's connection to national security concerns, specifically citing activities of Kurdish militant groups in Turkey and Syria.

== Offensive ==
Beginning on 6 December 2024, the SNA initiated extensive and escalating military operations in the eastern countryside of Aleppo Governorate. The operations featured intensive drone surveillance and artillery strikes targeting multiple villages located to the northwestern countryside of Manbij under SDF control, including Aoun al-Dadat, al-Daraj, Umm Jaloud, Sayada, and Umm Adas. The Manbij Military Council (MMC), operating under SDF command, reported reconnaissance aircraft alleged by the SDF to belong to Turkey conducted repeated bombing missions. The council also reported that Turkish drone operations occurred approximately twenty times along the Turkish-SDF border region on three different fronts, including towards Manbij and neighboring Al-Bab.

According to Council leader Sherfan Darwish, SDF forces successfully repelled infiltration attempts along the front line. According to the MMC, the SDF maintained control over Manbij city and its surrounding countryside, the town of Al-Arima near Al-Bab, and Tabqa in Raqqa Governorate. Despite circulation of footage showing SNA military buildups near Manbij, which the MMC claimed included Turkish mercenaries, the SDF leadership dismissed these as dated material, characterizing them as components of an information warfare campaign. The administration issued statements declaring their readiness to resist the offensive, characterizing the Turkish-backed operations as a threat to regional stability and inter-communal relations.

On 6 December, the Syrian Observatory on Human Rights (SOHR) reported that an SDF fighter was killed and others wounded in Turkish artillery shelling of Manbij.

On 7 December, two SDF fighters were killed and others wounded in a Turkish kamikaze drone strike on position in Manbij City. SNA claimed to have captured Jableh Al-Hamra and Tal Aswad but SDF claimed to have repelled any SNA attacks on multiple fronts.

On 8 December, the Turkish state-run Anadolu Agency reported that Orayma and Umm Dadat were captured by the SNA. SOHR alleged that Turkey started supporting the SNA's offensive by conducting drone strikes on SDF positions. Turkish reports claim that 80% of Manbij were captured by the SNA. The MMC denied any gains by the SNA. SOHR reported that SNA gained control of other "large neighborhoods in the city" and a partial withdrawal of the MMC to the east of the Euphrates. After Turkish claims that large parts of the region had been captured, the Manbij administration released a video outside the government building in central Manbij, stating that Turkish backed forces failed to breach the city and the SDF was committed to holding Manbij.

On 9 December, the Turkish state-run Anadolu Agency claimed that the city was captured by the SNA. The SDF denied this, stating it as "psychological warfare" and "propaganda". The SOHR stated that SNA had captured most of the city, claiming withdrawal of the Manbij Military Council, except for positions in the rear of Manbij. It was also reported that after holding talks, the United States and Turkey reached an agreement which resulted in the SDF withdrawing from Manbij.

On 10 December, the SOHR reported that pro-Turkish factions began "revenge operations" against civilians living along Al-Jazeera Road and in the neighborhoods of Al-Asadiya and Nawajah, saying that troops killed at least three Kurdish civilians, one of whom was a woman, and burnt and looted several civilian homes while "humiliating" their residents. SOHR said Turkish-backed factions also "extrajudicially executed tens of injured combatants" who were part of the Manbij Military Council Forces and were receiving medical treatment in northern Manbij city.

On 11 December, Mazloum Abdi, commander-in-chief of the SDF, announced that SDF soldiers "will be withdrawn from the area as soon as possible" following a US-brokered ceasefire agreement.

== Aftermath ==
The Turkish offensive in northern Syria expanded, with the Turkish Armed Forces launching airstrikes in the vicinity of Kobani later that month.

On 23 December 2024, the SDF's Manbij Military Council launched an offensive in the eastern countryside of Aleppo to regain control of positions around the Tishrin Dam and to gain further territory along the Euphrates River.
