= Tishrin Dam =

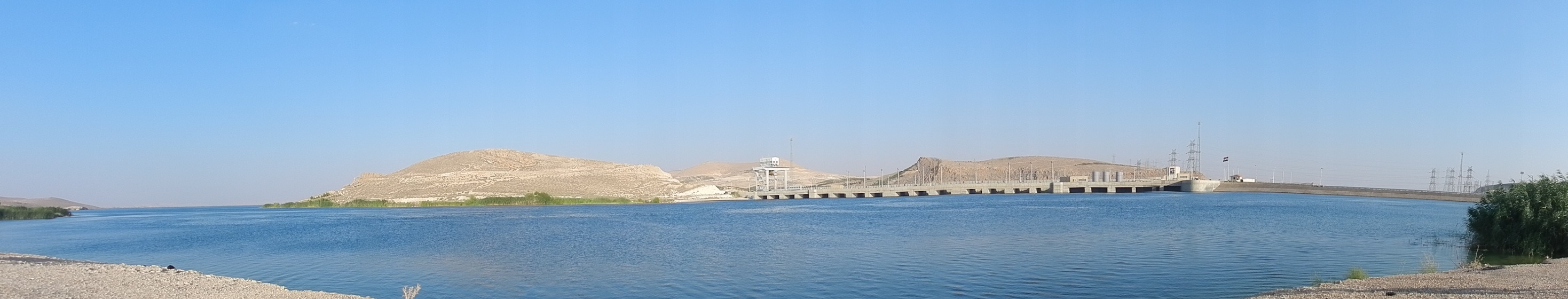
- View of the Tishrin Dam

- Location of the Tishrin Dam in Syria
- Interactive map of Tishrin Dam
- Official name: سد تشرين
- Country: Syria
- Location: Aleppo Governorate, Syria
- Coordinates: 36°22′53″N 38°11′00″E
- Purpose: Hydroelectric power generation, Flood control, Irrigation
- Status: Operational
- Construction began: 1991
- Opening date: 1999
- Construction cost: $400 million (estimated)
- Built by: Syrian Government, with international collaboration
- Designed by: Hassan Fathy (design influence)
- Owner: Syrian transitional government

Dam and spillways
- Type of dam: Rock-fill dam
- Impounds: Euphrates River
- Height (foundation): 60 m
- Height (thalweg): 58 m
- Length: 560 m (1,840 ft)
- Elevation at crest: 310 m
- Width (crest): 10 m
- Width (base): 180 m (590 ft)
- Dam volume: 2.5 million m³
- Spillways: 3
- Spillway type: Overflow spillway
- Spillway length: 200 m
- Spillway capacity: 11,000 m³/s
- S pillway volumetric flow rate: 10,000 m³/s

Reservoir
- Creates: Tishrin Reservoir
- Total capacity: 2.5 billion m³
- Active capacity: 2.0 billion m³
- Inactive capacity: 500 million m³
- Catchment area: 11,000 km²
- Surface area: 75 km²
- Maximum length: 30 km
- Maximum width: 5 km
- Maximum water depth: 50 m
- Normal elevation: 250 m
- Tidal range: N/A

Tishrin Power Plant
- Operator: Unknown
- Commission date: 1999
- Decommission date: N/A
- Type: Hydroelectric power station
- Hydraulic head: 58 m
- Turbines: 3 x 60 MW
- Pump-generators: None
- Pumps: None
- Installed capacity: 180 MW
- Capacity factor: 65%
- Overall efficiency: 85%
- Storage capacity: N/A
- 2022 generation: 600 GWh
- Website; Ministry of Irrigation

The Tishrin Dam (Arabic: سد تشرين, romanized: Sadd Tišrīn, lit. 'October Dam'; Kurdish: Bendava Tişrînê) is a dam on the Euphrates river, located 90 kilometres (56 mi) east of Aleppo in Aleppo Governorate, Syria. The dam is 40 metres (130 ft) high, and has 6 water turbines capable of producing 630 MW. Construction took place between 1991 and 1999. Rescue excavations in the area that would be flooded by the dam's reservoir have provided important information on ancient settlement in the area from the Pre-Pottery Neolithic A (PPNA) period onward.

In November 2012, rebel fighters captured the dam from Syrian Government forces of President Bashar al-Assad during a battle of the Syrian Civil War. In September 2014, the Islamic State captured the dam from rebel forces.

In December 2015, the Kurdish-led and U.S.-backed Syrian Democratic Forces (SDF) captured the dam from the Islamic State. The dam plays a strategic role as it is one of the few crossing points across the Euphrates into the Kurdish-controlled north east. It remained under Kurdish control (as of December 2025) ever since its capture, despite attempts by the Syrian National Army (SNA) and Turkish Armed Forces (TAF) to capture it. An agreement between the SDF and the Syrian transitional government envisioned joint control over the dam.

The dam was captured by the Syrian transitional government forces during their January 2026 offensive against the SDF.

== Characteristics of the dam and the reservoir ==
The Tishrin Dam is a hydroelectric rock-fill dam on the Euphrates, located upstream from the much larger Tabqa Dam. The dam is 40 metres (130 ft) high and has 6 turbines capable of producing 630 MW. Annual power production of the Tishrin Dam is expected to be 1.6 billion kilowatt hour. The capacity of the 60 kilometres (37 mi) long reservoir is 1.3 cubic kilometres (0.31 cu mi), which is small compared to the capacity of Euphrates Lake of 11.7 cubic kilometres (2.8 cu mi) directly downstream from the Tishrin Dam. Apart from the Euphrates, the Tishrin Dam reservoir is also fed by the Sajur River.

== History ==
=== Construction ===
Construction started in 1991, and was completed in 1999. One reason for the construction of the Tishrin Dam was the lower than expected power output of the hydroelectrical power station at the Tabqa Dam. This disappointing performance can be attributed to the lower than expected water flow in the Euphrates as it enters Syria from Turkey. Lack of maintenance may also have been a cause. The Tishrin Dam is the last of three dams that Syria has built on the Euphrates. The other two dams are the Tabqa Dam, finished in 1973, and the Mansoura Dam, finished in 1986. In the 2000s, Syria had plans to build a fourth dam on the Euphrates between Raqqa and Deir ez-Zor – the Halabiye Dam.

=== Rescue excavations in the Tishrin Dam Reservoir region ===
The Tishrin Dam Reservoir has flooded an area in which numerous archaeological sites were located. To preserve or document as much information from these sites as possible, archaeological excavations were carried out at 15 of them during construction of the dam. Among the oldest excavated and now flooded sites is Jerf el Ahmar, where a French mission worked between 1995 and 1999. Their work revealed that the site had been occupied between 9200 and 8700 BC at the end of the Pre-Pottery Neolithic A period and the beginning of the Pre-Pottery Neolithic B. In its multiple occupation phases, the site contained a sequence of round and rectangular buildings. In the later occupation levels of the site, a number of buildings have been excavated that were partly dug into the soil and had stone walls. Their size, internal division, decoration and the finds of human skulls as foundation deposits led the excavators to suggest that these buildings had a communal function. These finds were deemed so important that in 1999, flooding of the Tishrin Dam Reservoir was postponed for two weeks so that three houses could be dismantled and rebuilt in a museum near the site. Other sites excavated in the project were Jerablus Tahtani and Tell Ahmar the latter being on the north bank of the Euphrates around 33 Kilimetres north of the dam.

The very large archaeological area near the high citadel of Tall Bazi was also flooded by the artificial lake.

=== Syrian Civil War ===
On 26 November 2012, rebel fighters captured the dam from Syrian Government forces of President Bashar al-Assad during a battle of the Syrian Civil War. The dam's capture cut off major land-based supply lines for government forces, and further strained their soldiers fighting in the city of Aleppo.

In September 2014, the Islamic State captured the dam from rebel forces.

In December 2015, the Kurdish-led and U.S.-backed Syrian Democratic Forces captured the dam from the Islamic State.

As part of Operation Dawn of Freedom, the Turkish-backed Syrian National Army launched an offensive against the Syrian Democratic Forces to take the dam on 8 December 2024. On 13 December 2024, several Turkish-affiliated news websites claimed that the dam was captured, but Kurdish news sources refuted them, claiming that the Kurdish forces still controlled the dam. Once again on 26 December 2024, the Turkish Ministry of Defense claimed control over the dam, but SDF spokesperson Ferhad Şamî refuted these claims, by posting a video of himself at the dam on the same day. An SDF counteroffensive in early 2025 secured the dam and its surroundings from further SNA advances.

On 12 April 2025, the SDF and the Syrian caretaker government agreed to participate in joint military patrols along the dam and to keep it under Kurdish civilian administration. Following the deal, the YPG and YPJ leadership, including Mazloum Abdi and Rohilat Afrin, visited the dam on 18 April 2025. The dam was later captured by the Syrian transitional government forces during their January 2026 offensive against the SDF.

== See also ==
- Water resources management in Syria
- Operation Shah Euphrates
