= Timeline of the Syrian civil war (November 2024–present) =

The following is a timeline of the Syrian civil war from November 2024. Information about aggregated casualty counts is found in casualties of the Syrian civil war.

On 27 November 2024, a coalition of Syrian opposition groups called the Military Operations Command led by Islamist Hay'at Tahrir al-Sham (HTS) launched a lightning offensive against pro-government Syrian Arab Army (SAA) forces in Aleppo, Idlib, Hama and Homs Governorates in Syria. This was followed by other rebel offensives from the Southern Front, the Syrian Democratic Forces (SDF), and the Syrian Free Army. The government continued to get some backing from its allies Russia and Iran, including Iran's Islamic Revolutionary Guard Corps (IRGC), and Hezbollah, although these allies were entangled in their own conflicts in Ukraine (see Russo-Ukrainian war (2022–present)) and Lebanon (see Israel–Hezbollah conflict (2023–present), 2024 Israeli invasion of Lebanon and Iran–Israel conflict during the Syrian civil war).

In the Battle of Aleppo, 29 November to 2 December, HTS-led forces took Aleppo from the government. In the Southern Syria offensive, 29 November to December 2024, rebels organised in the Southern Operations Room, took most of Southern Syria. In the 2024 Hama offensive, 30 November to 5 December, rebels took Hama. In the Palmyra offensive, 6–7 December, US-backed rebels took Palmyra. The capital Damascus fell to rebels on 7–8 December. According to official state reports in Russian mass media and media footage, President Bashar al-Assad left Damascus by air to Moscow, where he was granted asylum, sealing the fall of his regime. That day, Israel launched an invasion of Syria's Quneitra Governorate, aiming to seize the UN buffer zone in the Golan Heights.

There was also fighting between the Turkish-backed rebel Syrian National Army (SNA) and the US-backed and Kurdish-led SDF in Northeastern Syria, in Operation Dawn of Freedom, 30 November to 12 December, part of a larger Turkish-backed offensive in northern Syria, to which the SDF responded with the East Aleppo offensive from late December, as well as some skirmishes between all these groups and the Islamic State (ISIS) in the Northeast (especially in the Deir ez-Zor offensive, 17 November to 3 December).

== 2024 ==
=== November 2024 ===
On 4 November, according to the UK-based Syrian Observatory for Human Rights (SOHR), three SDF fighters and four government SAA soldiers were killed by SNA during clashes in Tell Abyad, north of Al-Raqqa.

On 17 November, according to SOHR, a SDF fighter was killed in an ISIS attack on military position.

On 19 November, according to SOHR, five SNA fighters were killed in an SDF infiltration operation in Abdouky Al-Kabeer Village west of Tel Abyad City.

On 20 November 2024, the Israeli Air Force conducted an airstrike on residential buildings and an industrial area in Palmyra in central Syria. According to the SOHR, the strikes killed at least 108 people, including 73 Iranian-backed Syrian militiamen and 29 foreign Iranian-backed militiamen, mostly members of the Harakat Hezbollah al-Nujaba of Iraq, as well as 15 Hezbollah militants. The strikes also injured more than 50 people.

On 21 November, according to SOHR, two SDF fighters were killed and 10 others were injured after an ISIS Improvised explosive device (IED) exploded targeting their vehicle near Al-Azbah junction in the northern countryside of Deir ez-Zor province.

On the same day, according to SOHR, an SAA soldier was killed and four others injured in an IED attack by ISIS cells in Al-Rasafah desert in south-western Al-Raqqah.

On 22 November, according to SOHR, two SDF fighters were killed in clashes with SNA fighters on the Abdouki frontline near the city of Tell Abyad.

On 23 November, according to SOHR, two SAA soldiers were killed after ISIS militants ambushed their vehicle in the al-Bishri desert, in the Deir ez-Zor countryside.

On 23 November, according to SOHR, two IRGC troops were killed and two injured in an ISIS attack in Deir Ezzor countryside.

On 24 November, according to SOHR, two SDF fighters were killed and one critically injured in an IED attack by ISIS in the Deir ez-Zor Province.

On the same day, according to SOHR, 15 SNA fighters were killed in an SDF infiltration attack on the Al-Daghlabash frontline in Aleppo countryside, while the Syrian Network for Human Rights reported SDF rocket attacks on al-Bab (in which two civilians were killed) and rockets striking mosques, schools and utilities.

On 25 November, according to SOHR, a SDF fighter was killed in clashes with SNA in the Afrin countryside.

On 25 November, according to SOHR, a National Defence Forces (NDF - government-loyalist militia) fighter was killed by ISIS cells in Al-Raqqah province.

On 25 November, according to SOHR, a SAA soldier was killed and 9 others injured in an IED attack occurred in Homs.

On 25 November, according to SOHR, two Hezbollah fighters were killed five injured in Israeli airstrike on Homs Province.

On 26 November, according to SOHR, two SDF fighters were killed in an attack by ISIS cells on Al-Hasakah and Al-Raqqah Highway.

==== HTS-led offensive in the Northwest ====
On 27 November, the HTS launched an offensive in the northwestern area of the Aleppo Governorate, capturing several towns and villages.

On 28 November, according to SOHR, a SDF fighter was killed by Turkish drone strike on north of Al-Raqqah province.

On 29 November 2024, Syrian opposition group Tahrir al-Sham, along with allied Turkish-backed groups in the Military Operations Command, entered the Syrian government-held city of Aleppo.

That day, according to SOHR, a SDF member was killed in Al-Qamishly by unidentified gunmen. According to SOHR, a SAA soldier was killed and 2 injured in an attack in Al-Suwaydaa Province. On 29 November, according to SOHR, 54 people were killed in Syria.

On 30 November 2024, opposition groups captured most of Aleppo amidst the collapse of pro-government forces. On 30 November, according to SOHR, a SAA soldier and three Bedouin tribe members were killed in Al-Suwaydaa. On 30 November, according to SOHR, 70 people were killed in Syria. On the same day, according to SOHR, three SNA fighters were killed in a Russian airstrike on their positions in Al-Karidiya frontline in Al-Bab countryside eastern of Aleppo.

The SOHR reported that at least 746 people were killed in Syria in the month of November 2024, the largest monthly death toll in nearly 60 months.

=== December 2024 ===
On 1 December, as part of the renewed rebel advance into the southern Idlib and Hama Governorates, seven HTS fighters were killed in Khan Shaykhun by booby-trapped missiles in a former SAA warehouse that was abandoned by retreating government forces in the city.

On the same day, according to SOHR, opposition forces took control of Khanasir and As-Safira towns and Kuwayres military airbase in the eastern countryside of Aleppo. Nine SAA soldiers were killed during the fighting.

Furthermore, according to SOHR, six Iranian militiamen were killed in a local gunmen attack in Talbiseh.

According to SOHR, 13 civilians were killed by a Russian airstrike in Idlib city and 12 other people were killed in a Russian airstrike in Aleppo city centre including 2 HTS fighters.

On 2 December, according to Kurdish sources, the AANES General Security Directorate arrested an ISIS emir in the town of Al-Izba, north of Deir ez-Zor. They said the emir was responsible for several recent bombings and assassinations in the town.

According to SOHR, eight civilians were killed in a HTS rocket attack on Hama city. Four civilians were killed in a Russian airstrike near the directorate of health in Idlib city.

Heavy clashes began between Syrian Army forces and forces of HTS on the renewed Hama front in the towns of Karnaz and Suran. Clashes also occurred on the frontline in the Al-Ghab Plain, amid a failed HTS offensive where at least ten HTS members were killed attacking SAA positions.

On 2 December, according to SOHR, three SDF fighters were killed in a Turkish drone strike on their car on M4 Highway. Also on 2 December, a SAA soldier was killed and another injured by unidentified attackers in Al-Hasakah.

Between 2–3 December, according to SOHR, at least 68 people, including 23 Syrian opposition fighters, 29 government soldiers and 16 civilians were killed in Syria.

On 3 December, according to SOHR, a SDF fighter and a civilian were killed in clashes with SAA. Two civilians were killed in a Russian airstrike in Khan Shaykhun, southern Idlib. At least 17 SAA soldiers and 8 HTS fighters were killed in the clashes north of Hama on 3 December; two civilians were also killed by HTS shelling in the city. According to SOHR, at least 11 SDF/civilians, including a woman, were executed by SNA fighters amid many more Kurdish civilians being held captive and evacuated from the Al-Shuhabaa area and northern Aleppo countryside. Also on 3 December, six SAA soldiers were killed in an American airstrike near Deir ez Zor airport. The Syrian Network for Human Rights (SNHR), which is aligned with pro-Turkish opposition groups, reported that the SDF used a rocket launcher to fire multiple rockets at Jarablos city in eastern rural Aleppo governorate, killing two.

Between 3–4 December, according to SOHR, at least 129 people, including 70 Syrian opposition fighters, 47 SAA soldiers and 12 civilians were killed in Syria.

On 5 December 2024, opposition forces captured Hama.

On 6 December, advancing south on the M5 motorway from Hama, HTS-led rebels entered Al-Dar al-Kabirah, on the northern edge of Syria's third city Homs, where the government forces were expected to make their last stand. The government lost control of Deraa to local rebels, who gave government officers safe passage to Damascus. Civilian residents of Suwaida took control of their town from the government. The Russian government ordered its nationals to leave the country. Iran pledged extra support for the regime, while Israel struck targets on the Lebanese border to prevent Hezbollah engagement.

That day, the Deir ez-Zor Military Council, Kurdish and Arab fighters of the SDF took control of Deir ez-Zor city after government forces and Iran-backed militias withdrew. According to SOHR, a SDF fighter was killed and three others injured in a Turkish shelling of Manbij.

=== Fall of Damascus and Israeli incursion ===
On 7 December, rebel Syrian forces entered the capital city of Damascus, amid rumours that Bashar al-Assad had fled the nation. On that same day, according to SOHR, two SDF fighters were killed in a Turkish kamikaze drone strike in Manbij City.

On 8 December, Syrian opposition forces in the Operations Room to Liberate Damascus, who had been waiting for HTS-led forces to take Homs, captured Damascus, with thousands of government soldiers surrendering before fighting began.

On the same day, hours after the fall of the Assad regime, Israeli forces were sent to reinforce the UN's forces (UNDOF) in maintaining the UN buffer zone, citing concerns of extremist groups operating in the region after the dissolution of the Syrian Arab Army, while stating that they were not interested in interfering in events in Syria. Hours later, Israeli forces invaded and seized the UN buffer zone in the Golan Heights, declaring the 1974 disengagement agreement void. Additionally, they moved forces into Syrian territory, occupying the Druze towns of Khan Arnabeh and al-Baath. Israel later took complete control of Mount Hermon after taking control of the Syrian side without facing resistance.

=== Fighting in Manbij and Kobani in North, stabilisation of new government in Damascus ===
Military situation in December 2024 following the fall of the Assad regime

On 9 December, Turkish-backed SNA fighters captured the city of Manbij in northern Syria.

On the same day, according to SOHR, 11 civilians were killed by a Turkish drone strike in SDF-controlled Al-Mustariha in Ain Issa countryside in northern Al-Raqqah. The same day Ali Mahmoud, the highest ranking Syrian officer was found dead.

Furthermore, according to SOHR, 11 SDF fighters were also killed in a Turkish drone strike on an SDF position near Qarquzaq bridge east of Manbij.

On 9 December, according to SOHR, at least 80 people were killed in Syria.

On 10 December, according to SOHR, at least 198 people were killed in Syria, including 68 SDF and 30 SNA fighters in clashes in Manbij. The SOHR reported that at least 3 civilians and tens of wounded Manbij Military Council fighters were extrajudicially executed by SNA fighters after the fall of the Manbij area to SNA forces following the Manbij offensive.

Five fighters of Ahrar al-Sharqiya were killed in clashes with SDF forces after attacking SDF positions in Al-Aliyah and Al-Susah towns in Tel Tamr countryside in northern Al-Hasakah, according to SOHR.

As part of a new offensive into ex-SAA positions in the Homs desert, ISIS militants captured and executed at least 54 ex-Syrian Army soldiers, according to SOHR.

Eight civilians were killed by a Turkish drone strike in the village of Safia in the Ain Issa countryside, according to SOHR. Another two civilians were also killed in a separate Turkish drone strike in Ja’ada Village south west of Kobani.

At least six employees working in the Al-Taim oil field were killed in an attack by ISIS fighters, according to SOHR.

On 11 December, according to SOHR, six SDF fighters were killed and four others wounded by a Turkish drone strike in West of Euphrates.

On 12 December, according to SOHR, at least 51 people were killed in Syria.

At least five civilians were executed by ISIS militants in two separate attacks in the Jabal Al-Omour area in the Homs countryside, according to SOHR.

On 13 December, according to SOHR, at least 73 people were killed in Syria, including in an execution of 11 people carried out by gunmen in the village of Bahra, Hama.

Four SNA fighters were killed in clashes with SDF forces in an infiltration attempt in the frontline of Qabiyat Saqiro village in Ain Issa countryside and the frontline of Sluk in Al-Hamid and Al-Sharikah villages in Tel Abyad countryside according to SOHR.

On 14 December according to SOHR, four militants of the Sham Legion were killed in an ambush by pro-Assad gunmen in the Al-Mazir’a area in Jabla countryside, Latakia. Russia evacuated its T4 base in Homs, leaving it with just two bases in Syria, Khmeimim airbase and Tartous port.

That night, Israel launched multiple airstrikes on Syrian targets, including its naval base in Latakia, despite Abu Mohammed al-Jolani saying HTS was not interested in conflict with Israel.

On 15 December, schools and universities, as well as bars in Christian neighbourhoods, re-opened in Damascus, and large celebrations of the fall of the regime continued. The US and UK both said they had initiated diplomatic contact with al-Jolani's government.

On 16 December, according to SOHR, two ex-SAA soldiers were kidnapped and executed by HTS militants near Homs city. Austin Tice's mother sent Israeli Prime Minister Benjamin Netanyahu a letter, urging him to halt Israel's airstrikes in Syria to enable the search for him to continue.

On 17 December, according to SOHR, a SDF fighter was killed by ISIS attack in Deir Ezzor.

On 17 December, according to SOHR, two SDF fighters was killed and four others wounded by ISIS attack on checkpoint in Al-Raqqa.

On 17 December 2024, the US said the ceasefire in the Northeast had been extended, but pro-Kurdish sources said that the factions supported by Turkey announced they would discontinue the ceasefire with groups supported by the US, such as Syrian Democratic Forces. Kurdish sources told Al-Monitor that the SNA, an umbrella informed the SDF "that it would be returning to 'a state of combat against us'... The sources said negotiations between the SDF and the SNA had 'failed' and that 'significant military buildups' in areas east and west of the Kurdish town of Kobani on the Turkish border were being observed." According to SOHR, four SNA fighters were killed in clashes with SDF forces in an attack on Teshrin Dam in Al-Raqqa countryside. Two civilians were also killed in the crossfire.

In Damascus that day, France met with the transitional government, re-opened its embassy, and said they wold host a meeting of states to end sanctions on the country.

On 18 December, according to SOHR, 21 SNA fighters were killed after attacking SDF forces on residential areas in Teshrin Dam near Kobani City. Netanyahu promised that he would not strike the area near the prison where Austin Tice might be held. Former top prosecutor Stephen Rapp says that the mass graves discovered near Damascus "show the worst abuses since the Nazis."

On 19 December, both Turkey and the SDF renewed their commitment to fighting for Kobani, rejecting any ceasefire deal. The SDF leader confirmed for the first time that several non-Syrian Kurds were fighting in its ranks, committing to their departure as Syria entered a new era. On 19 December, two Kurdish journalists, Jihan Belkin and Nazim Dashdan, affiliated to AANES news platforms were killed in a suspected Turkish airstrike on their car in Ain-Al Arab countryside.

The same day, Iraq returned nearly 2000 Syrian government soldiers who had fled the rebel advance, on condition of their protection by the new government.

On 20 December, US officials arrived in Damascus to meet the transitional government.

Since the beginning of December, Turkish airstrikes left 20 SDF fighters, 15 former SAA soldiers and 16 civilians killed during Operation Dawn of Freedom.

On 20 December, two ISIS fighters including the emir of Wilayat Al-Khair were killed in a US airstrike in Deir Ezzor.

On 21 December, five civilians were killed in a Turkish airstrike in areas of operation.

Furthermore, five SDF fighters were killed by Turkish and allied artillery shelling of positions on Teshrin Dam.

On 22 December, two civilians were killed in a Turkish artillery shelling of Kobani. In an interview with CBS News in Amman, Roger D. Carstens called Bashar al-Assad's secret jails "horrifying and disturbing, yet fascinating."

On 23 December, the SDF launched an offensive into recently lost areas in the eastern Aleppo countryside, following the end of the Manbij offensive and the clashes in the Kobani area.

On 24 December, the bodies of 9 dead ex-SAA soldiers were found near Kaziya in Al-Sukhna area in Homs desert, after being captured and executed by ISIS militants in the area.

On 25 December, three former SAA soldiers were executed by ISIS cells in the eastern Homs desert.

On the same day, 12 opposition fighters were killed by armed gunmen following an arrest an ex-officer of the SAA in Tartus.

A protestor was also shot and killed by opposition forces during a protest against HTS fighters attacking an Alawite shrine in Homs city.

A civilian was stabbed to death in a hospital in Manbij by SNA fighters following an earlier dispute.

On 29 December, five SNA fighters were killed by SDF special forces in an infiltration operation on two positions in Al-Raihaniya Village near Tel Tamr Town in the Al-Hasakah countryside.

On the same day, at least 11 people, mostly civilians, were killed in an Israeli airstrike on a former Syrian Army weapons depot in Adra, near Damascus.

== 2025 ==
=== January 2025 ===
Military situation in January 2025

On 2 January, multiple Israeli airstrikes were reported near Al Safira, targeting defense factories and a research center on the outskirts of the city.

Between 2–3 January, at least 50 SNA fighters and 12 SDF fighters were killed in clashes in the eastern Aleppo countryside.

On 4 January, at least 20 SNA fighters and 4 SDF fighters were killed in the fighting in the eastern Aleppo countryside.

On 5 January, three SDF fighters were killed and four others injured in a Turkish airstrike on Teshreen Dam, pro-SNA media reported that the SNA managed to outflank the SDF advance and took some villages on the Aleppo-Raqqa highway.

On 6 January, four SNA fighters and an SDF fighter were killed following artillery attacks near the Teshreen dam area. Five SNA fighters were also killed in the area in clashes the following day.

On 7 January, four SDF fighters were killed in an attack by two ISIS gunmen in the Jazara Mashhour area in western Deir Ezzor countryside.

On 8 January, a family of three were shot dead in an execution by unknown gunmen in a farm in Ain Al-Sharqiyah town, Latakia. On the same day, five civilians were killed by a Turkish airstrike targeting public convoy near Teshrin Dam.

Between 8–9 January, 26 SNA fighters and 6 SDF fighters were killed in clashes on frontlines in Manbij countryside in the eastern countryside of Aleppo.

On 9 January SOHR reported that, a TAF soldier was killed by an SDF kamikaze drone on Al-Arishah base in Ras Al-Ain countryside.

Between 9–10 January, at least 10 SNA fighters and 2 SDF fighters were killed in clashes in the eastern Aleppo countryside.

On 10 January, four ISIS militants were killed in a coalition-backed SDF security operation in the Bako area in Al-Hasakah countryside.

On 11 January, seven SNA fighters were killed in clashes on the Manbij frontline.

On the same day, SOHR reported, three people were shot dead in a summary execution in Harim in Idlib countryside after being accused of being 'thugs'.

On 12 January, SOHR reported, five Shia civilians, including four brothers, were shot dead in a summary execution in the gardens of Baba Amr in Homs.

Between 14–15 January, 13 SNA fighters and 5 SDF fighters were killed in clashes near the Tishrin dam in the eastern Aleppo countryside.

On 16 January, five civilians were killed in Turkish airstrikes near the Tishrin dam in the eastern Aleppo countryside.

On the same day, an SDF fighter was executed by ISIS cells and body was dumped in the western part of Abu Khashab town in the western countryside of Deir Ezzor.

On 17 January, eight SNA fighters were killed in clashes on the Tishrin dam frontline in the eastern Aleppo countryside.

Between 18–19 January, 21 SNA fighters, 6 civilians and one SDF fighter were killed in clashes on the frontline.

On 19 January, SOHR reported, a civilian was shot dead by HTS militants in Jaburin village in the Homs countryside. Three people were also executed by gunmen in Mahrada city in the Hama countryside.

On 21 January, SOHR alleged that five people were executed by Military Operations Command militants during a 'security operation' in the Shia majority town of Al-Ghour Al-Gharbiya Town in the north-western Homs countryside.

Between 21–22 January, 8 SNA fighters and 4 civilians were killed, with fighting continuing in the Manbij, Tishreen Dam and Qara Qozak Bridge areas.

On 22 January, pro-Assad insurgents attacked a checkpoint of the new Syrian regime in Jableh city in Latakia countryside, killing two HTS fighters and injuring two others.

On the same day, SOHR reported, a former Assad-era photographer of the Syrian Arab News Agency was shot dead by gunmen in Hama city.

Between 22–23 January, 15 SNA fighters and three civilians were killed in fighting in the eastern Aleppo countryside.

Between 20–23 January, SOHR claimed, at least 22 civilians had been executed by gunmen linked to the Syrian transitional government in various attacks on ex-Assad loyalists, Alawites and Shia Muslims.

On 23 January, a car bomb exploded in the town of Manbij, northern Syria, killing 3 people and injuring another 5.

On 24 January, according to SOHR, 16 people were killed in a mass execution by suspected HTS militants in the majority Alawite and Greek Orthodox village of Fahil, in the Homs countryside. 53 other people were also arrested by the militants.

Between 24–25 January, according to SOHR, at least 7 people were executed in different security campaigns by the forces of the new Syrian government in several villages in the Homs and Hama countryside.

On 26 January, 12 SNA fighters, one SDF fighter and 2 civilians were killed in clashes on the east Aleppo frontline.

On 27 January, 10 SNA fighters were killed in the eastern Aleppo countryside.

Between 28-29, 13 SNA fighters were killed in clashes on the Immu village Al-Hawshariyah village in Manbij countryside and on the frontline of Qarrah Qarquzaq bridge.

On the same day SOHR reported that, a TAF officer was killed by an SDF rocket attack on a Turkish base in Bab Al-Faraj, within “Peace Spring” area in northwest Al-Hasakah.

On 30 January, an American airstrike killed Muhammad Salah al-Za’bir, a senior militant of the Hurras al-Din group in northwestern Syria.

In late January, SOHR said, at least four civilians from the Homs countryside were killed under detention after being arrested by the Military Operations Command.

On 31 January, at least 13 SNA fighters, one SDF fighter and a civilian were killed in clashes south of Manbij and in Deir Hafer in the eastern Aleppo countryside.

On the same day, SOHR said that 10 civilians were shot dead in a massacre in the Alawite-majority village of Arza in north western Hama countryside.

=== February 2025 ===
In February, the Syrian Observatory on Human Rights and other sources continued to report acts of sectarian violence. On 1 February, SOHR reported that four people were shot dead in a mass execution by gunmen in the Shia village of Tell Dahab in the Hama countryside. It also alleged that an Alawite professor was shot dead in an execution in Ma’Araba in Rif Dimashq. It said it had documented that at least 61 people were killed in Syria that day.

Fighting continued between the SDF and SNA in east Aleppo. Between 1–2 February, SOHR reported that 14 SNA fighters and 7 SDF fighters were killed on the frontlines of Qarrah Quzaq and Teshreen dam in the eastern countryside of Aleppo.

The city of Manbij was a particular focus of this fighting. On 3 February, at least 21 people were killed by a car bomb explosion in Manbij.

On the same day, SOHR reported that at least six people had been recently executed in revenge attacks by gunmen in Jdeidet Al-Wadi in Rif Dimashq. Also, a fighter SOHR described as an "Uzbek" jihadist was shot dead in an assassination in Kafr Ruhin, Idlib.

Between 3–4 February, 5 SNA fighters and 5 SDF fighters were killed in clashes on the Manbij frontline, according to SOHR.

On 6 February, SOHR said a SDF fighter was killed and another wounded in an ISIS attack in Deir ez-Zor.

On 7 February, the SOHR documented that at least 30 people were killed in Syria.

Between 7–8 February, 15 SNA fighters were killed in clashes with SDF forces on different frontlines of the eastern countryside of Aleppo, according to SOHR.

On 9 February, SOHR alleged that three Alawites of the same family from the Al-Zahraa neighbourhood of Homs city were executed after being arrested by the Military Operations Command administration in the city.

On 10 February SOHR reported that, four SDF fighters were killed in Turkish drone strikes along the Manbij countryside frontline, according to SOHR.

On the same day, an ISIS fighter was shot dead and another blew himself up during an SDF raid in Markadah town in southern Al-Hasakah countryside.

On 11 February, SOHR reported that three SDF fighters were killed in clashes with SNA forces on the Manbij frontline.

On 12 February, SOHR alleged that nine fighters were killed in SNA infighting in Tell Abyad in the 'Peace Spring' area in northern Syria.

On the same day, SOHR said two SNA fighters were killed after SDF forces attacked two positions on the frontline of Qarrah Quzaq hill and in the telecommunication tower in Qabr Immu village, in the eastern Aleppo countryside.

On February 15, an American airstrike killed a senior finance and logistics official of Hurras al-Din in Northwestern Syria.

The same day, the Syrian Network for Human Rights (SNHR) said that the SDF fired multiple rockets at al-Khafsa town in eastern rural Aleppo governorate, killing one woman and injuring several.

Also on 15 February, SOHR said that two Shia men were killed in separate execution attacks in the Homs countryside. On the same day, SOHR alleged, a former SAA soldier was found dead in Ariha, Idlib, with a note attached claiming he was executed for "dropping barrel bombs on civilians". On 15 February, a SDF member was killed and three others wounded in a Turkish airstrike on Al-Raqqa countryside.

On 16 February, SOHR said that four people of the same family were shot dead in an execution by gunmen in the Al-Sheikh Saeed neighbourhood in Aleppo. The family allegedly supported the former Assad regime.

On 16 February, SOHR documented that at least 14 people were killed in Syria.

On 17 February, the SNHR reported that the SDF fired rockets at al-Khafsa town in eastern rural Aleppo governorate, striking a mosque.

On 19 February, a SDF member was killed by accidental gunshot in a family infighting, incident take place in Al-Hasakah.

On 20 February, SOHR said two SDF fighters were killed and three others wounded in a Turkish airstrike on Tişrin Dam area.

On 21 February, SOHR said two SDF fighters were killed in a landmine explosion in Ain al-Arab countryside.

On 23 February, SOHR said that two civilians were found executed in the Hama countryside, including one that had been mutilated.

The SNHR said that the SDF used drones to target a water processing station in southern al-Khafsa town in eastern rural Aleppo governorate, in an area under SNA control.

On 24 February, SOHR said at least 18 people were killed in Syria.

On 25 February, a British Reaper drone targeted and killed an ISIS militant in the Aleppo countryside.

On the same day, an American drone strike killed Abu Ahmed Al-Shamy, a senior member of Hurras al-Din in Al-Nasr Al-Khairiya in Jarablus countryside eastern of Aleppo.

On the same day, SOHR two people were killed in an Israeli drone strike in Jurod Al-Naby area opposite to Sarghaya Town in Rif Dimashq, southern Syria.

During the night between 25-26 February, Israel launched a series of airstrikes targeting sites in Rif Dimashq and Daraa, southern Syria. The airstrikes killed at least 4 people.

On 26 February, SOHR said 12 people were killed including four SDF fighters in a Turkish airstrike on fortified SDF position in Deir ez-Zor.

On 26 February, the SOHR documented that at least 21 were people killed in Syria.

On 27 February, SOHR said the Military Operations Administration carried out a large-scale military operation in Ain Shams village, saying it was "prosecuting affiliates of the former regime". SOHR said the operation left 5 civilians dead and a further 52 arrested.

On the same day, a civilian working for SDF was killed in Western Deir ez-Zor Countryside, according to SOHR.

Also, four civilians including a former Syrian Navy officer, were killed after members of the Military Operations Administration stationed in Latakia city fired on a car with an RPG, according to SOHR. Four Alawite civilians were shot dead in a sectarian attack by armed gunmen in a café in Baniyas, according to SOHR.

On 27 February, the SOHR documented that at least 15 people were killed in Syria.

=== March 2025 ===
On 1 March, the SOHR reported that, three men of the same family were killed by gunmen in a summary execution in Al-Sheikh Saeed neighbourhood in Aleppo City.

On 2 March, SOHR reported that, four civilians were killed and six others were injured after gunmen opened fire on praying civilians in Hayalin Town in the Hama countryside.

On 2 March, the SOHR reported that at least 22 people were killed in Syria.

On 4 March, two General Security Service members were killed in an ambush by Pro-Assad militiamen in Latakia's Daatur district. Two men were later killed by Syrian security forces following the ambush. Three former members of the Assad-era Military Intelligence Directorate were shot dead by gunmen in Al-Sanamayn City, northern Daraa province.

On 4 March, the SOHR documented that at least 14 people were killed in Syria.

On 5 March, three members of the General Security Service and a local militiaman were killed by gunmen of the former Assad-era Military Intelligence Directorate in Al-Sanamayn city in northern Daraa countryside.

On the same day, two SDF members were killed in clashes with SNA on Manbij frontlines.

Between 4-6 March, eight members of the General Security Service, six Pro-Assad gunmen and one civilian were killed in armed clashes in Al-Sanamayn city in northern Daraa.

On 6 March, On March 6, Britain unfroze the assets of Syria's central bank and 23 other entities—including banks, oil companies, and other “entities that were previously used by the Assad regime to fund the oppression of the Syrian people," the Foreign Office said.

That day, a co-ordinated insurrection began in Western Syria after pro-Assad loyalists launched attacks on areas controlled by the Syrian Transitional Government (STG). 71 people were killed in these initial attacks including 35 STG fighters, 32 Pro-Assad fighters and four civilians. Latakia's provincial director said that an armed pro-Assad group, affiliated with Suhayl al-Hasan (nicknamed "The Tiger") and which included the newly-formed Military Council for the Liberation of Syria, conducted an attack in the city. Helicopters of the Syrian Air Force conducted airstrikes in the village of Beit Ana in response to this attack. Clashes in the village resulted in one security force member killed and two wounded. Alawite leaders called for peaceful protests in response to the air strikes.

SOHR reported an ambush in Jableh, near the city of Latakia, that killed at least 16 security personnel and four civilians, with dozens of fighters loyal to Assad were killed or wounded in the clashes, in what SOHR called "the worst clashes since the fall of the regime". The government said it had arrested regime loyalist General Ibrahim Huweija, chief of the Air Force Intelligence Directorate from 1987 to 2002 and suspected the 1977 murder of Lebanese Druze leader Kamal Jumblatt. SOHR said that 52 Alawite civilians were killed by Syrian government and allied forces in parts of the Latakia countryside.

Also SOHR reported that, a TAF soldier was KIA in an attack by SDF drone near Kara Kozak bridge.

Four smugglers were also reported killed in clashes with Jordanian forces on border.

On 7 March, the SOHR reported that at least 240 people were killed in Syria, including 34 STG fighters, 42 Pro-Assad loyalists and 155 civilians, mostly killed in massacres by the Syrian government and allied forces on Alawite civilians. On 8 March 2025, SOHR said that at least 745 Alawite civilians had been killed by Syrian government forces and allied militias since 6 March 2025. On the same day, at least 32 STG fighters and 28 Pro-Assad fighters were killed in the western Syria clashes. Six civilians were shot dead by gunmen in the town of Inkhil, Daraa. Three fighters of the Syrian Ministry of Defense were shot dead by gunmen in Deir ez-Zor city.

On 9 March, the SOHR reported that a further 106 Syrian government fighters, 102 pro-Assad fighters and 85 civilians had been killed in the clashes in Western Syria. Increasing the death toll in the clashes since 6 March to 1,315. The next day, the SOHR reported that 143 civilians were killed by Syrian government and allied forces in the clashes in Western Syria, increasing the death toll in Western Syria to 1,454 and the number of civilians killed by government and allied forces to 973 since 6 March.

On 10 March 2025, SDF leader Mazloum Abdi agreed to integrate his forces into the Syrian transitional government institutions.

Also, the SOHR reported that 95 civilians were killed by Syrian government and allied forces in Western Syria, increasing the death toll in Western Syria to 1,549 and the number of civilians to 1,068 since 6 March.

On the same day, a SDF member was killed in an ISIS attack in eastern Deir Ezzor.

On 11 March, the SOHR documented 157 civilian deaths in the violence committed by Syrian government and allied forces in Western Syria, increasing the death toll in Western Syria to 1,706 and the number of civilians killed by Government forces to 1,225 since 6 March.

On 12 March, the SOHR documented 158 civilian deaths in the massacres committed by the Syrian government and allied militias in Western Syria, increasing the death toll in Western Syria to 1,864 and the number of civilians killed by Government forces to 1,383 since 6 March.

On the same day, five civilians were killed in sectarian attacks in the Daraa countryside, including Nour Al-Dein Al-Labbad, a former minister who defected from the Assad-era Syrian Ministry of Foreign Affairs, who had just returned from France.

Also, an Asayish member was killed and two others were injured in an ambush by ISIS cells in the Al-Hazima area in Al-Raqqa.

On 14 March, the SOHR documented 93 civilian deaths in massacres committed by the Syrian government and allied militias in Western Syria, increasing the death toll in Western Syria to 1,957 and the number of civilians killed by Government forces to 1,476 since 6 March.

On 15 March, 16 people were killed after an unexploded bomb detonated and destroyed a four-storey building in Latakia.

On 16 March, three Syrian government fighters were killed in a firefight with gunmen in the Zita Damon area on the Syria-Lebanon border.

On the same day, nine civilians were killed in a Turkish airstrike in a village south of Kobani in the north-eastern Aleppo countryside.

On 17 March, the SOHR documented the deaths of 42 Syrian government personnel, 5 Pro-Assad insurgents and 81 civilians in the clashes in Western Syria, increasing the death toll in Western Syria to 2,089 and the number of civilians killed by Government forces to 1,557 since 6 March.

On the same day, the SOHR reported that four Syrian government fighters were killed in clashes with Lebanese forces on the Syrian-Lebanon border.

Furthermore, the SOHR documented that 3 civilians were shot dead after unidentified gunmen stormed the Alawite majority Al-Aziziya village in Sahl Al-Ghab in Hama.

On 18 March, SOHR reported a SDF member was killed in TAF artillery shelling in Northern Raqqa countryside.

On the same day, the SOHR released a report documenting that in the first 100 days after the fall of the Assad regime, at least 4,711 civilians were killed including 1,805 in extrajudicial executions.

Also, three people were killed in an Israeli airstrike near Daraa, southern Syria.

Between 18-22 March, the SOHR reported at least 7 SNA fighters were killed in fighting in the eastern Aleppo countryside.

On 20 March, the SOHR released a report stating that at least 656,493 people had been killed in the war in Syria since March 2011, with 546,150 being documented by name.

On 22 March, the SOHR documented the deaths of a further 57 civilians killed in massacres by Syrian government fighters in Western Syria, increasing the death toll in Western Syria to 2,146 and the number of civilians killed by Government forces to 1,614 since 6 March.

On 25 March, five people were killed in an Israeli airstrike in the town of Koya, near Daraa.

On 29 March SOHR reported, two SDF members were killed in a landmine explosion in Kara Kozak Frontline.

On the same day SOHR report, three people were killed and 11 injured in a Kurdish family infighting in Aleppo Countryside under areas of SDF.

The SOHR reported that at least 2,644 people were killed in Syria in March 2025.

=== April 2025 ===
On 2 April, at least nine people were killed in Israeli artillery bombardment during an Israeli military incursion into Daraa province, southern Syria.

On 3 April SOHR reported that, five people were killed in infightings under areas of SDF.

On 9 April, the SOHR reported that at least 32 people were killed in Syria, including 17 civilians killed by Syrian Ministry of Defense forces in attacks in Tartous.

On 13 April SOHR reported that, a SDF member was killed and three others wounded in an ISIS attack in Eastern Deir Ezzor Countryside.

On the same day SOHR reported that, a SDF member was killed in an ISIS attack in Eastern Deir Ezzor Countryside.

On 15 April SOHR reported that, two General Security Service members were shot dead by gunmen in al-Muzayrib, Daraa.

On 16 April SOHR reported that, an Assadist insurgent was killed and another one captured in clashes at security headquarters in Hama Province.

On 17 April SOHR reported that, a SDF member was killed by ISIS cells in Al-Hasakah.

On the same day SOHR reported that, two Syrian security forces were killed by unknown gunmen near Syria-Lebanon Border.

On 19 April SOHR reported that, a SDF commander was killed and another wounded by a TAF airstrike in Northern Al-Raqqah.

On 21 April SOHR reported that, a civilian was killed by SDF members in Al-Hasakah.

On the same day SOHR reported that, a man was killed and another sustained serious injuries due to random gunfire during a Kurdish wedding in east of Deir Ezzor, within SDF-held areas.

On 21 April, the SOHR reported that at least 19 people were killed in Syria.

On 22 April, six civilians were shot dead by gunmen in an execution in Sheikh Saeed neighbourhood in Aleppo City.

On 23 April SOHR reported that, four people were killed and six wounded by a landmine explosion in SDF-held Al-Hasakah Province.

On the same day SOHR reported that, two people were killed and another wounded due to landmine explosion in SDF-held Northern Deir Ezzor countryside.

On 28 April, five Self-Defense Forces members were killed and another was injured in a surprise ISIS attack on their positions in Jarzat Al-Milaj in Deir Ezzor countryside.

On 28 April, the SOHR reported that at least 24 people were killed in Syria.

On 29 April SOHR reported that, six Assad insurgents and six pro-Government auxiliary forces were killed in clashes at Jaramana city.

On 30 April, the SOHR reported at least 42 people were killed in Syria, including 16 General Security Service fighters in an attack on Ashrafieh Sahnaya in the Damascus countryside.

The SOHR reported that at least 452 people were killed in Syria in April 2025.

=== May 2025 ===
On 1 May, at least 15 Druze men were extrajudicially executed by STG forces in an ambush on the highway between Damascus and Al-Suwaidaa. The men were allegedly travelling to support a Druze uprising in Sahnaya town in Rif Dimashq.

On the same day SOHR reported that, a female SDF member was killed by TAF drone strike in Teshrin Dam.

Furthermore, SOHR reported that, four Syrian soldiers were executed by ISIS militants in an ambush near Deir Ezzor countryside.

On 1 May, the SOHR reported that at lesat 65 people were killed in Syria.

Also SOHR reported that, two collaborators of former regime were killed in an attack at Aleppo City.

Also SOHR reported that, a former member of Baath Party was killed in an attack at Ashrafiyat Sahnaya.

Also SOHR reported that, a civilian was killed by a landmine explosion in SDF-held Al-Raqqah.

Also SOHR reported that, a civilian was killed in an attack at SDF-held Northern Deir Ezzor.

On 2 May SOHR reported that, a civilian was killed and three injured by a landmine explosion in Al-Suwaydaa.

On the same day, at least two civilians were killed and eight others were injured by Israeli airstrikes in southern Syria.

On 3 May, the SOHR reported that at least 12 people had been killed in sectarian attacks and executions across Syria in the previous 48 hours.

On the same day, it was reported that three civilians of the same family were killed in an extrajudicial execution on their farm in Ain Badriyah village in western Sahil Al-Ghab.

On 5 May SOHR reported that, two Druze fighters were DOW after taking severe wounds in Ashrafiyat Sahnaya.

On the same day, a woman was shot dead after armed gunmen attacked a nightclub in Damascus.

On 6 May SOHR reported that, two SDF members were killed by an ISIS attack in eastern Deir Ezzor.

On 6 May, the SOHR reported at least 20 people were killed in Syria.

On 7 May, the SOHR reported at least 17 people were killed in Syria.

The SOHR documented that between 1–11 May at least 49 people had been killed in extrajudicial executions and assassinations in Syria.

On 17 May, three ISIS militants and two General Security fighters were killed in a clash in Al-Haidariya neighbourhood, Aleppo city. One of the ISIS militants detonated a suicide vest during the fighting.

On 18 May SOHR reported that, four General Security Service members and a civilian were killed after a car bomb exploded outside a police station in Al-Mayadeen City, eastern Deir ez-Zor.

On 19 May SOHR reported that, a SDF member was killed and two others wounded in an ISIS attack on a military post in Deir Ezzor.

On 25 May SOHR reported that, a SDF member was killed and two others wounded in an ISIS attack in Al-Raqqah.

On 31 May SOHR reported that, a SDF member was killed and another wounded in an ISIS attack in eastern Deir Ezzor.

The SOHR reported that at least 428 people were killed in Syria in May 2025, including 41 killed in extrajudicial executions.

=== June 2025 ===
On 1 June SOHR reported that, three SDF members were killed in an IED attack by ISIS cells near Tell Abyad countryside.

The SOHR reported at least 21 people were killed in Syria on 1 June.

On 3 June, five Alawite men were found shot dead in the Ish Al-Warwar neighbourhood in Damascus, after being detained by General Security Forces the day prior. Another two people were shot dead in field executions in Hama city.

On 4 June, eight Alawite civilians were shot dead by Syrian state security forces at a checkpoint in Al-Rabiaa Village in Hama countryside.

On 4 June, at least 23 people were killed in Syria.

On 5 June, the SOHR reported that at least three civilians were killed in a General Security Service raid in Beit Aana and Al-Daliyah villages in Jableh countryside, where several buildings were burned down.

On 11 June, the SOHR reported that at least 29 people were killed in Syria.

On 17 June SOHR reported that, a SDF member was killed by ISIS attack in Deir Ezzor.

On 22 June, the Islamic State (alleged) or Saraya Ansar al-Sunnah (claimant) carried out a suicide attack against a Greek Orthodox church in Damascus, killing 22 people and injuring another 63.

On 26 June, a child was murdered by a drunk SDF member in Deir Ezzor, incident resulted in mass Anti-SDF protests.

The SOHR reported that in June 2025, at least 391 people were killed in Syria, including 29 civilians killed by Military Operations Command and 46 civilians killed in extrajudicial executions.

=== July 2025 ===
On 2 July SOHR reported that, a SDF member was killed in a landmine explosion in Al-Raqqah.

On 3 July SOHR reported that, two people including a former SDF member were killed by ISIS in Eastern Deir Ezzor.

On 13 July, at least 37 people, including 27 Druze and 10 Bedouin were killed in Druze-Bedouin clashes in Al-Maqous neighbourhood east of Al-Suwayda city. The following day, Syrian Army forces were deployed in the area as a result of the clashes, in which 14 Syrian Army personnel were killed. Israel also launched airstrikes on Syrian forces in southern Syria as a result of the clashes. The clashes continued involving all sides.

On 14 July, five Asayish fighters were killed after ISIS militants attacked their checkpoint on Al-Dashisha road in southern Al-Hasakah countryside.

By 15 July, at least 203 people had been killed in the clashes in Southern Syria including 93 Syrian security forces.

On 16 July, at least 18 Druze and 72 Syrian Army soldiers and 6 civilians were killed in the clashes in southern Syria, increasing the death toll in the Southern Syria clashes to 319.

On 17 July, the SOHR reported that at least 197 people were killed in the clashes in Southern Syria, including 78 Syrian government fighters. Another 58 civilians were also reportedly killed in extrajudicial executions carried out by government forces in As-Suawayda, increasing the death toll in the clashes to 516.

On 19 July, the SOHR reported that since 17 July, 247 Druze militiamen, 84 Syrian government fighters and 102 civilians had been killed, increasing the death toll in southern Syria since 13 July to 940.

Between 19-20 July, the SOHR reported that 101 Druze militiamen, 28 Syrian government fighters and 33 civilians were killed in the clashes in southern Syria, increasing the death toll since 13 July to 1,120.

Between 20-21 July, the SOHR reported that at least 78 Druze militiamen and 77 Syrian government fighters were killed in the fighting in southern Syria, increasing the death toll since 13 July to 1,265.

Between 21-23 July, the SOHR reported that at least 28 Druze militiamen, 7 Syrian government fighters and 17 Bedouin tribesmen were killed in the fighting in southern Syria, increasing the death toll since 13 July to 1,339.

On 25 July SOHR reported that, a SDF member was killed and two others injured in an ISIS attack in Eastern Deir Ezzor.

On 28 July SOHR reported that, a collaborator of SDF was killed and his wife injured by ISIS attack in Deir Ezzor.

On 31 July SOHR reported that, a SDF member and a SDF civilian guard were killed while another civilian injured in an ISIS attack in Deir Ezzor.

The SOHR reported that at least 1,732 people were killed in Syria in July 2025.

=== August 2025 ===
On 1 August SOHR reported that, five SDF members were killed and another injured by an ISIS attack in Eastern Deir Ezzor.

On 6 August SOHR reported that, two SDF members were killed and another injured by an ISIS attack in Eastern Deir Ezzor.

On 8 August SOHR reported that, a SDF member was killed by an ISIS attack in Eastern Deir Ezzor.

On 14 August SOHR reported that, a SDF member was killed by ISIS attack in Southern Al-Hasakah.

On the same day SOHR reported that, Clashes erupted between SDF and Arab national insurgents, during clashes an Arab militia was killed three others injured and six SDF members were captured.

On 15 August SOHR reported that, a former SAA soldier was killed in an assassination in Hama City.

On 16 August, the SOHR reported that since 8 August, 43 Syrian government fighters had been killed and a further 48 civilians had been executed by Government forces in the clashes in Southern Syria, increasing the death toll since 13 July to 1,677.

On 20 August SOHR reported that, a SDF member was killed by an ISIS attack in Deir Ezzor.

On 21 August SOHR reported that, two Kurdish Asayish members and a gunman were killed during a pursuit in Al-Raqqa.

On 22 August SOHR reported that, a failed ISIS attack on Government forces left two ISIS militants and a security member were killed in Western Deir Ezzor.

On 24 August SOHR reported that, a former SDF commander was killed by an ISIS attack in Eastern Deir Ezzor.

On 25 August SOHR reported that, a SDF member was killed by an ISIS attack in Deir Ezzor countryside.

On the same day SOHR reported that, a Kurdish Asayish member was killed by an ISIS attack in Al-Hasakah.

On 26 August SOHR reported that, six Syrian soldiers were killed in an Israeli drone strike in Rif Dimashq.

On the same day, a SDF member was killed by an ISIS attack in Deir Ezzor countryside.

=== September 2025 ===
On 1 September SOHR reported that, two ISIS militants were killed in a failed attack on SDF military post in Al-Raqqa.

On 4 September, a British Royal Air Force drone targeted and killed an ISIS militant that was driving a car near Aleppo.

On 5 September SOHR reported that, a SDF member was killed by an ISIS attack in Deir Ezzor.

On 7 September SOHR reported that, two Syrian soldiers were killed by an unidentified gunmen in Idlib.

On 8 September SOHR reported that, three Kurdish Asayish members were killed and another one injured by attack of their fellow Asayish member, incident occurred in al-Hawl Camp.

On 11 September SOHR reported that, a civilian was killed by SDF members in Eastern Deir Ezzor.

On 12 September SOHR reported that, a Kurdish Asayish member was killed and two others injured by an ISIS attack in Eastern Deir Ezzor.

On 19 September SOHR reported that, a SDF member was killed and two others injured by an ISIS attack in Western Deir Ezzor countryside.

On the same day SOHR reported that, a SDF member was succumbed to the wounds by yesterdays ISIS attack in the Eastern Deir Ezzor countryside.

On 20 September SOHR reported that, a Government security forces member was killed and two others injured by an unidentified gunmen attack in Homs countryside.

On 22 September SOHR reported that, a SDF member was killed by the person over a dispute, incident occurred in Aleppo countryside.

On 24 September SOHR reported that, two Syrian soldiers and a SDF member were killed in a series of clashes across the border areas.

On 25 September SOHR reported that, five SDF members were killed and another one injured by an ISIS rocket attack in Deir Ezzor.

On 26 September SOHR reported that, four SDF members and an ISIS militant were killed by clashes in Eastern Deir Ezzor.

On 28 September, a British drone targeted and killed an ISIS militant during an arial patrol north of Hama.

=== November 2025 ===
The SOHR reported that 232 people were killed in the conflict in Syria in November 2025.

=== December 2025 ===
On 6 December 2025, the SOHR reported that two SDF fighters were killed after ISIS insurgents opened fire on them from a motorcycle near Al-Malha in Al-Hasakah countryside.

On 13 December, two US soldiers and an American translator were killed and three Syrian soldiers were injured by an attack at Palmyra City and an assailant was killed.

On 15 December, four Syrian Army fighters were killed after Islamic State militants ambushed them in the town of Maarat al-Numan, Idlib.

On 22 December, clashes erupted in Aleppo between the SDF and Syrian state.

On 23 December, three STG fighters were killed in clashes with gunmen north-west of Al-Suwaidaa city.

On 26 December, a mosque in Homs was bombed in an attack by Saraya Ansar al-Sunnah, killing at 9 people and wounding another 18.

On 28 December, following the bombing in Homs, protests broke out in the city of Homs leading to four people being killed in counter-protest clashes.

On 31 December, an Islamic State-linked suicide bomber killed himself and a Syrian police officer in Aleppo after being caught attempting to approach a church with a suicide vest.

== 2026 ==
=== January 2026 ===
On 4 January, an SDF delegation led by the commander-in-chief Mazloum Abdi met Syrian officials in Damascus to discuss the integration of the SDF into government structures per the March 2025 agreement. Brigadier General Kevin J. Lambert, the commander of the Combined Joint Task Force – Operation Inherent Resolve, took part in the discussions per SDF media; it was not clear whether the Syrian president Ahmed al-Sharaa was personally involved. Both sides announced that further talks would follow. The form of the agreed integration remained contested, with Damascus demanding individual absorption of SDF fighters into existing Syrian Army units. The government issued no official statement about the meeting, whereas the Syrian state television alleged that the meeting delivered no "tangible results" regarding the implementation of the existing agreement.

On 6 January 2026, the Aleppo clashes again broke out began in Aleppo, following a Syrian Army offensive into the northern SDF-held parts of the city. The intent was to capture the Kurdish inhabited Sheikh Maqsood neighbourhood of Aleppo. Following clashes the Syrian army and SDF reached a ceasefire agreement on 10 January, under which the SDF withdrew from the neighborhood to northeastern Syria. Between 8-9 January, the SOHR reported that at least 17 Syrian Army fighters and 13 civilians had been killed in the clashes in Aleppo.

On 9 January, four Alawite civilians were shot dead in a sectarian attack outside Al-Kondi private hospital in Homs city, according to SOHR.

On 13 January, the 2026 northeastern Syria offensive began. The SDF reportedly destroyed three bridges linking SDF-controlled areas with government-held territory east of Aleppo. The Syrian army claimed that it had thwarted an attempt by the SDF to mine and blow up a bridge linking the villages of Rasm al-Imam and Rasm al-Krum, near Deir Hafer. On 14 January, the Syrian Army's Operations Authority announced the opening of a humanitarian corridor, that crosses Deir Hafer toward Hamima, controlled by the Syrian government forces and added that clashes occurred near the Tishrin Dam, the SDF repelled an assault in the city of Zubayda. On 15 January, the SDF closed the Tabqa, Raqqa and Deir ez-Zor border crossings with the Syrian government, "until further notice".

On 16 January, SDF commander-in-chief, Mazloum Abdi said on Twitter that the SDF would withdraw from Deir Hafer on 17 January, that this step came "based on calls from friendly countries and mediators, and our demonstration of good faith in completing the merger process and commitment to implementing the terms of the March 10 agreement." Reportedly on the same day, six members of the SDF deserted to the Syrian government forces.

On 17 January, following mediation from the US, the SDF withdrew from Deir Hafer and Maskanah, with the Syrian army entering them a few hours later, with the local people greeting the Syrian army, the SDF reported clashes in Dibsi Afnan, following a "betrayal" by the Syrian government forces and a violation of the agreement. Arab tribal leaders in SDF-held territory in Deir ez-Zor governorate told Reuters they were ready to take up arms against the Kurdish force if Syria's army issued orders to do so.

On 18 January, Syrian government forces captured Al-Tabqah, Tabqa Dam and the Tabqa Airbase. Additionally, Syrian army captured the entire eastern Deir ez-Zor countryside, along with all its town and villages, as well as the oil and gas fields located in the region including the Al-Omar field, the country's largest, and the Conoco gas field. State-run Syrian Arab News Agency (SANA) reported that SDF had blown up a bridge connecting Raqqa and positions south of it, also cutting the water supply. At around noon, tribal forces took control of Raqqa after major clashes, with the Syrian army entering the city after a few hours.

On 21 January, following the advance of the Syrian Army to the Al-Yaarubiyah border crossing with Iraq, the Syrian ministry of defence announced that seven Syrian soldiers were killed by an SDF drone strike on an ex-SDF explosive workshop near the border crossing. Another four Syrian soldiers were killed in an attack by SDF forces near Mount Abdulaziz, in the Hasakah countryside.

On the same day, the SOHR reported that four Kurdish men were executed by armed tribesmen in Raqqa city, following its capture by government forces.

On 20 January 2026, the Syrian government proclaimed a new ceasefire agreement with the SDF, temporarily committing its troops to stay out of the city centres of Hasakah and Qamishli or Kurdish villages in the Hasakah province. The SDF was given a four-day consultation period to develop a "practical mechanism" for integration of the areas remaining under its control. Sharaa then reiterated his guarantees for Kurdish "national, political, and civil rights" in Syria to ex-president of the Kurdistan Region Masoud Barzani, who in his turn expressed support for the new ceasefire agreement. Barrack stated on X that the US does not endorse federalism (Note: According to a Syrian source, US president Trump wanted a single interlocutor in the country.) and acknowledged that individual incorporation of SDF members into the Syrian Army "remained among the most contentious issues". Mazloum Abdi announced that the SDF had fallen back to Kurdish-majority areas in Kobani and al-Hasakah province, and declared that protecting those areas would be a "red line" in continued negotiations with the government. Saying they would not carry out military actions unless government forces attacked them first, the SDF declared they were ready to implement the 18 January agreement. However, the SDF claimed that government-aligned forces were shelling its positions shortly after the ceasefire came into effect.

On 30 January 2026, the STG announced that it had reached a comprehensive agreement with the SDF, including a ceasefire, gradual military and administrative integration, the deployment of Interior Ministry forces in al-Hasakah and Qamishli, the integration of local institutions into the state, guarantees of civil and educational rights for the Kurdish community, and the return of displaced persons. On 2 February, the General Security Service forces began deploying in al-Hasakah to implement the agreement signed between the STG and the SDF. The next day, the Syrian Ministry of Interior said its units began entering the city of Qamishli in Hasakah to implement the agreement. Al-Sharaa met with a delegation from the Kurdish National Council at the People's Palace in Damascus. On 4 February, the SDF's head of public relations Nour al-Din Issa Ahmad was appointed as governor of Al-Hasakah Governorate. The SDF previously nominated al-Din Issa Ahmad for the position as part of an agreement with the Syrian government on the region's administration. On 6 February, a Syrian Defense Ministry delegation, led by Brigadier general Hamza al-Hmaidi, met with SDF representatives in Hasakah to discuss the integration of SDF personnel into the Syrian Army and the implementation of the remaining terms of their agreement. On the same day, an Operations Command delegation, along with senior Syrian Army officers, met with the SDF and toured several sites in Hasakah to begin implementing the agreement.

=== February 2026 ===
On 9 February, protests began in as-Suwayda after four civilians were shot dead by a member of the General Security Service in the countryside of the southern province.

On 18 February, the SOHR reported that ISIS had launched its first insurgent attack on STG forces in Deir-ez-Zor since they took over the area from the SDF. The attack took place in Dhiban town in eastern Deir Ezzor countryside, killing one STG fighter and injuring another.

On 21 February, the SOHR reported that ISIS took responsibility for an attack on a Syrian government checkpoint in Sabahiyah in Raqqa, killing four fighters of the Syrian government. One ISIS militant was killed in the attack.

Furthermore, they took responsibility for the assassination of a man in Boqros town in the Deir ez-Zor countryside.

On 23 February, the SOHR reported that a government fighter was shot dead by suspected ISIS insurgents in Al-Mayadeen City in Deir ez Zor.

On 24 February, Syrian government forces carried out a security operation with commander Abdul Aziz Hilal al-Ahmad stating it was carried out after several days of close surveillance and targeted two points in the Beit Alouni and Basniya areas. Six people, including the leader of Saraya al-Jawad, Bashar Abdullah Abu Ruqayya and a government fighter were killed in the operation.

=== March 2026 ===
On 2 March, the SOHR reported that two Syrian government fighters were shot dead by ISIS militants on Al-Ma’abar road in Al-Rai in northern Aleppo countryside. The militants fled after committing the attack.

On 11 March, the SOHR reported that a Syrian police officer was shot dead by ISIS insurgents in Al-Sabha Town in Deir Ezzor countryside.

On 17 March, the SOHR reported that two Syrian police officers were killed after an ISIS militant attacked their patrol in the Al-Safira area in eastern Aleppo countryside. The ISIS militant detonated his suicide belt when pursued by Syrian authorities.

On 20 March, the SOHR reported that a member of the Syrian Army's 54th Division was shot dead by suspected ISIS cells on the road to Salqin, Idlib.

During the month of March, the SOHR reported that 13 Syrian government fighters had been killed in attacks by ISIS in Syria.

=== April 2026 ===
On 6 April, the SOHR reported a Syrian government fighter was shot dead by ISIS militants in Al-Sha’afah city in eastern Deir Ezzor countryside.

On 29 April, the SOHR reported that a Syrian soldier was shot dead by an ISIS sniper whilst on guard at a military checkpoint in the Manbij area in eastern Aleppo countryside. Furthermore, a private security guard was assassinated by ISIS cells in Al-Ra’ei city in northern Aleppo countryside.

The SOHR reported that at least 241 people were killed in Syria in the month of April 2026.

=== May 2026 ===
On 1 May, ISIS militants shot dead a Shia cleric in an assassination in Damascus.

On 11 May, two Syrian soldiers were killed after ISIS militants targeted a military bus with an IED in Syria's al-Hasakha province.

The SOHR reported that in May 2026, at least 287 people were killed in the conflict in Syria.

=== June 2026 ===
On 10 June 2026, the SOHR reported that at least 17 civilians had been killed in various conflict-related incidents in the past three days.

On 15 June, an Islamic State suicide bomber attacked a Syrian military headquarters in Raqqa city, killing two Syrian security members and wounding three more. Another ISIS fighter was killed before he could detonate his suicide vest.

On 20 June, two fighters of the Syrian Army's 76th Division were shot dead by ISIS fighters near Tahnah junction in the western countryside of Manbij.

On 27 June, two people were killed in an Israeli raid near Hodr town in the northern Al-Quinetra countryside.

=== July 2026 ===
On 1 July, a civilian was killed after suspected ISIS fighters opened fire on the town of Al-Baghuz Fawqani, Deir ez-Zor.

On 2 July 10 people were killed and 20 others were killed after a bomb was detonated inside a cafe in Damascus. The Syrian government announced they had arrested ISIS operatives responsible for the attack on 9 July.

On 7 July, two explosive devices exploded near the Four Seasons Hotel Damascus, killing a person and wounding 36 more. The attacks happened during the state visit of Emmanuel Macron there.

On 19 July, a Syrian Army fighter died of wounds sustained the day before after ISIS fighters shot him on a road in the vicinity of Al-Arimah area in eastern Manbij city.

On 20 July, the SOHR reported that at least 18 people had been killed in tribal infighting and family disputes in Syria since the beginning of July 2026.

On 24 July, the SOHR reported the deaths of 14 people from torture or medical neglect in transitional government prisons since the beginning of the year.

The SOHR reported that in July 2026, at least 231 people were killed in the conflict in Syria.

=== August 2026 ===
On 5 August, the SOHR reported that at least 29 people had been killed since the beginning of the month in a wave of increasing violence in the country.

On 6 August, 3 people were killed after an explosive device detonated against a minibus in Jaramana.

On 8 August, two Syrian soldiers were killed and another was injured after ISIS militants opened fire on them in the Al-Zour area in Jadidat Bakara town in eastern Deir Ezzor.

On 11 August, two fighters of Liwaa Al-Qamishli, an ex-SDF group now part of the Syrian Army, were shot dead in an attack on their post in Tawil Harb village in the southern countryside of Al-Qamishli.

On 16 August, three people were killed in separate armed attacks in Homs and Hama, including a Christian that was shot in the head in Homs.

=== September 2026 ===
On 9 September, at least 20 people were killed after an ammunition storage site exploded near Sarmada, Idlib.

On 17 September, three Internal Security Forces fighters were killed in clashes with armed gunmen in As-Sanamayn, southern Syria.

On the same day, the SOHR reported that between 11-17 September, 32 civilians were killed in acts of violence in Syria.

On 18 September, 11 Syrian Government fighters were killed in an explosion at a Syrian Army site in Ayaş area, west of Deir ez-Zor governorate.

The SOHR reported that at least 207 people were killed in the conflict in Syria in September 2026.

=== October 2026 ===
On 27 October, 7 civilians were killed, including three children, in Jordanian airstrikes on areas of Daraa, southern Syria.
