= Kuweires =

Kuweires may refer to:

- Kuweires, Idlib, a village in Idlib Governorate, Syria
- Kuweires Sharqi, a town in Aleppo Governorate, Syria
  - Kuweires Military Airbase, Syrian airbase near Kuweires Sharqi
  - Kuweires offensive (September–November 2015)
