= Bahra =

Bahra may refer to:

== Given name ==
- Bahra Mohammed (born 1993), Iraqi football and futsal player

== Surname ==
- Hadi al-Bahra (born 1959), Syrian politician and businessman

== Places ==
- Bahra, Hama, a village in Syria
- Jabal Bahra, name of the Syrian Coastal Mountain Range in the medieval period

== Other ==
- Bahra (newspaper), a Baghdad-based newspaper
- Bahra (river), a river of the Czech Republic and of Saxony, Germany
- Bahra', an ancient Arab tribe in Syria
- Bahra ceremony, a girl's coming of age ritual in Newar community of Nepal
- Bahra Biscuit Factory in Baku, Azerbaijan
