= Turkish offensive in Northern Syria =

Turkish offensive in Northern Syria may refer to:

- 2019 Turkish offensive into northeastern Syria
- Turkish–Syrian National Army offensive in Northern Syria (2024–2025)
