= Women's Media Union =

Syrian organisation of women journalists

- Established: 28 June 2020 (5 years ago)
- Types: organization
- Aim: gender equality, journalism
- Membership: 500 (2025)

Women's Media Union (YRJ) is an association of women journalists in north-eastern Syria created in June 2020.

== Creation ==
According to Arîn Sweid (or Swed), a spokesperson of YRJ, women's involvement in media in north-eastern Syria increased significantly during the Syrian civil war following the July–August 2012 People's Protection Units (YPG) military takeover of the region. Women media workers in the region held conferences in 2014, 2016 and 2020. The participatns of the 28 June 2020 conference, with 86 delegates, decided to establish the Women's Media Union (YRJ), with the goals of bypassing authoritarian governments' repression of women and women's points of view and of "delivering the voice and truth of a free woman to all parts of the world" to help women to "play their leadership role in building the system and a free and democratic society."

== Aims and activities ==
Arîn Sweid stated that the YRJ viewed women participating in media institutions as insufficient to achieve equality for women in the media, since particular usages of language and style continued to support patriarchy. Sweid called for women media workers in the wider Middle East region to coordinate in opposing misogyny in their media.

Sweid stated that the YRJ "defends all female media workers against sexist and psychological attacks". She stated that it supported Cîhan Bilgin following threatening phone calls from the Turkish National Intelligence Organization. Bilgin was killed in a targeted Turkish air attack in December 2024, along with another Kurdish reporter, Nazim Daştan.

According to Sweid, media coverage of the Turkish attacks on the Tishreen Dam by Hawar News Agency was continued by women journalists of the YRJ after Bilgin's death.

== Leadership and membership ==
Newroz Demhat was a member of the YRJ Executive Board as of June 2025. Arîn Sweid was a spokesperson of YRJ in 2023 and 2025.

At its creation in 2020, YRJ had a council of 31 people.

By its fifth anniversary in June 2025, YRJ stated that its membership included 500 journalists.

== See also ==
- Society of Women Writers and Journalists
