= Bahra Biscuit Factory =

Azerbaijani food company

- Industry: Food processing
- Founded: 2006
- Founder: N.H. Huseynov, H.H. Huseynov
- Headquarters: Azerbaijan, Baku
- Parent: Unikal Foodstuff Production Company
- Website: Unikal FPC (official site)

Bahra Biscuit Factory is a part of UNIKAL Foodstuff Production Company based in Baku, Azerbaijan.

== Overview ==
UNIKAL Foodstuff Production Company began production in 1992 in the Azerbaijan food industry's confectionery field, specializing in the production of baked sponge cake products. In 2006 UNIKAL Foodstuff Production Company began production of the manufacture of sponge cakes at its plant under the trademark "Bahra Biscuit Factory", and for a very short period of time developed in Azerbaijan's confectionery field under the motto "Health product for health food".

Currently, Bahra specializes in wholesale of a range of baked products, which includes rolls, biscuits, cakes, cookies and layered products. The company has factories spread across Azerbaijan, in Baku, Sumgayit, Ganja, Shaki, Agsu, Quba, Masalli, Salyan, Hajikabul and Nakhchivan, all under the umbrella trade mark of "Bahra Biscuit Factory". The company's products are only available in Azerbaijan.

== Production ==
The company's products are prepared on machinery made by leading Italian and German companies. The company's products are imported by such European countries as Turkey, Germany, Italy, Denmark and Austria. Bahra Biscuit Factory is also a distributor of products of Backaldrin Company of Azerbaijan. The company produces an assortment of baked product which include b rolls, biscuit pastries, cakes and sponge cakes.

== Awards ==
=== 35th Golden Award ===
The company won a Golden Award in 2008 in Paris for the "Year's Best Trade Mark" for its breads, buns and sponge cake, and was acknowledged for its production technology. Director of Unikal FPC, N.H. Huseynov, accepted the award at the ceremony.

=== "Ugur" National Award ===
In March 2010, Bahra was awarded the "UGUR" National Award for pace of development in Azerbaijan's Economy at an award ceremony held at the Gulustan Palace, which is the main state convention center of the Azerbaijani government. Niftali Huseynov accepted the award presented by the deputy, member of Milli Majlis (parliament), Sabir Hajiyev.
