= Rasm Harmil al-Imam =

Rasm al-Harmal al-Imam رسم الحرمل الإمام
- Town
- Location within Syria
- Coordinates: 36°13′22″N 37°41′4″E
- Country: Syria
- Governorate: Aleppo
- District: Dayr Hafir
- Subdistrict: Rasm al-Harmal al-Imam

Population (2004 census)
  - Total: 5,105
- Time zone: UTC+3 (AST)
- Area codes: Country code: 963, City code: 21 Town code: 664

Rasm al-Harmal al-Imam (Arabic: رسم الحرمل الإمام) is a town in northern Syria, administratively part of the Dayr Hafir District of the Aleppo Governorate, located 50 east of Aleppo. Nearby localities include Rasm al-Krum to the southwest, Dayr Hafir to the south and Rasm Kabar to the southeast.

Rasm al-Harmal al-Imam is the administrative center of Nahiya Rasm al-Harmal al-Imam of the Dayr Hafir District.

== Economy ==
The economy of the town depends on agriculture, trade, services.

== Education ==
There are two elementary schools, one intermediate (junior-high) school, and one secondary (high) school.

== Health ==
The town is provided with a public health clinic. Also there are some specialized private clinics and pharmacies.
