= Operation Dawn of Freedom =

SNA-led operation during 2024 Syria offensive

- Part of the 2024 Syrian opposition offensives, Turkish offensive into north-eastern Syria (2024–2025), and the Rojava conflict during the Syrian civil war
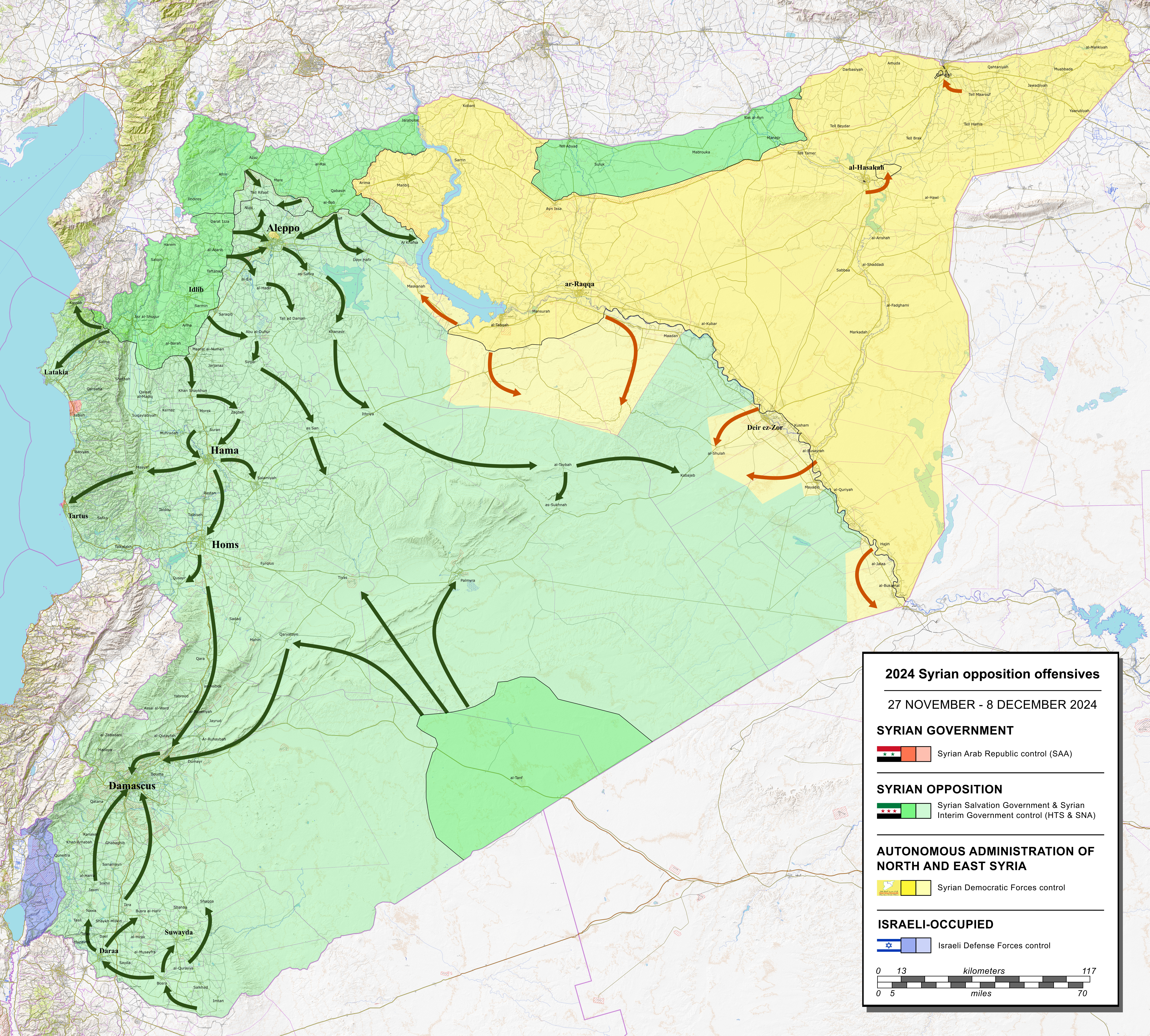
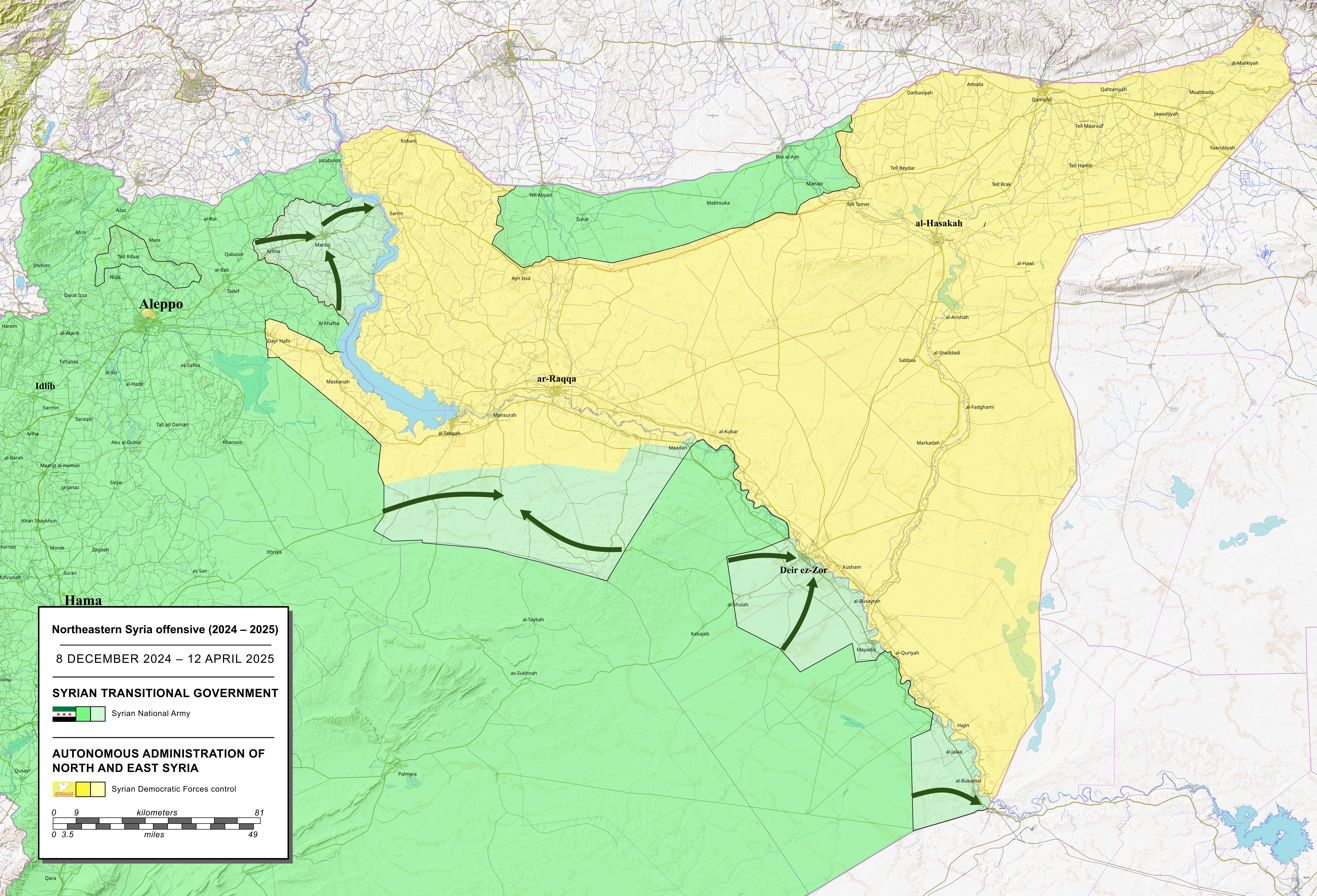
- Map of the offensive in Syria Controlled by the Syrian opposition Controlled by the Syrian Democratic Forces
Date	30 November 2024 – 23 December 2024 (1 week and 5 days)
Location	Aleppo Governorate, Syria
Result	SNA victory; Temporary US-mediated truce between SDF and SNA
Territorial changes	SNA capture Tadef, As-Safira, Tell Rifaat, Manbij and numerous other villages, as well as the Kuweires airbase and Menagh airbase; SNA cut the territorial corridor between SDF-controlled Tell Rifaat and Manbij; SDF withdraws from Manbij; SDF launches the East Aleppo offensive

Belligerents
(Syrian opposition) Syrian Interim Government; Turkey (from 8 December)	Autonomous Administration of North and East Syria (Ba'athist Syria) Syrian Arab Republic (surrendered) (until 8 December); Russia

Units involved
(Syrian opposition) Syrian National Army; (Syrian opposition) Dawn of Freedom Operations Room; Sultan Murad Division; Levant Front; Jaysh al-Islam; Maghawir al-Sham; Liberation and Construction Movement; (Syrian opposition) Ahrar al-Sharqiya; Joint Force; Sultan Suleiman Shah; (Syrian opposition) Hamza Division; (Turkey) Turkish Armed Forces; Turkish Air Force	Syrian Democratic Forces; People's Protection Units; Manbij Military Council; Tabqa Military Council; Sireen Military Council; Asayish; Self-Defense Forces; Syrian Arab Armed Forces (surrendered); Syrian Arab Army (surrendered); Russian Armed Forces; Russian Aerospace Forces; Russian Air Force

Casualties and losses
(Syrian opposition) 34 killed (Note: 7 killed on 1 December, 12 killed on 6 December, and 15 killed on 8 December.) (Syrian opposition) 222 killed (Note: 12 killed on 3 December and 210 killed on 13 December) (SDF claim) (Syrian opposition) 14 captured (SDF claim) (Syrian opposition) 42 vehicles destroyed (SDF claim) (Syrian opposition) 6 tanks destroyed (SDF claim)	41 killed (Note: 3 killed on 1 December, 3 killed on 7 December, 35 killed on 8 December); 3 injured (Ba'athist Syria) 53 killed (Ba'athist Syria) 33 captured (Turkish claim) (Ba'athist Syria) 14 Aero L-39 Albatros captured
- 13 killed 11 SDF/civilians executed by the SNA; Unknown number of civilians held captive Several injured

Operation Dawn of Freedom (Note: Arabic: عملية فجر الحرية, romanized: eamaliat fajr alhuriya; Turkish: Özgürlük Şafağı Operasyonu) refers to a military offensive launched by the Syrian National Army (SNA; a Turkish-backed coalition of forces) against the Syrian Arab Armed Forces (SAAF) and the Syrian Democratic Forces (SDF), targeting the northern Aleppo Governorate region between al-Bab and Tadef within the Operation Euphrates Shield zone.

== Background ==
Following the initiation of the 2024 Northwestern Syria offensive on 27 November and the capture of several regions of the city of Aleppo, the Syrian National Army (SNA) commenced Operation Dawn of Freedom on 30 November. The operation was officially announced by the Prime Minister of the Syrian National Coalition Abdurrahman Mustafa during an NTV interview. He outlined two primary strategic objectives: intercepting SDF supply networks and establishing a corridor connecting al-Bab, under the Turkish occupation of northern Syria, to Tel Rifaat.

Operation Dawn of Freedom is unlikely to have occurred without approval from Turkey. It was linked to Turkish demands for a "Safe Zone" in Syria.

== Offensives ==
Following intense clashes between SNA forces and those loyal to the Assad government in northern Aleppo Governorate, SNA forces captured the town of Tadef later the same day. Clashes broke out between SDF and SNA forces as SDF forces began to enter government-controlled towns in northern Aleppo, which government forces were retreating from due to the Tahrir al-Sham-led offensive on Aleppo from Idlib. On 1 December 2024, SNA captured the towns of as-Safirah, Khanasir and the Kuweires airbase, while clashes occurred between SNA and SDF in the Sheikh Najjar district of Aleppo city. The capture of Kuweires airbase had cut the "corridor" that the SDF had established between the Shahba Canton centred on Tell Rifaat and Manbij. Since the operation began, approximately 850km² of territory had been captured by the SNA.

On the evening of 1 December 2024, the SNA launched an offensive on the SDF-held town of Tell Rifaat, capturing the town along with several surrounding villages, including Shwargha, Menagh, Maranaz, Kafr Naya, Kuweires Sharqi, Shaykh Issa, Deir Jamal, and Ain Daqna. The remaining SDF-controlled towns in the region were besieged and cut off from communication after being encircled by opposition forces. During its offensive, Turkey launched strikes on Rojava's territory in support of their offensive.

On 2 December 2024, the SDF announced plans to evacuate Kurdish IDPs from Tel Rifaat and the Shahba region to SDF-held areas in Aleppo's Sheikh Maqsood district and northeastern Syria.

On 4 December 2024, SDF reported clashes in Dayr Hafir and in the southern Manbij region and confirmed casualties among the SNA.

On 6 December 2024, Dawn of Freedom operations room announced an offensive on the SDF-held city Manbij. On 8 December 2024, Turkey started supporting the SNA's offensive by conducting drone strikes on SDF positions. On 9 December 2024, SDF withdrew from Manbij. On 9 December 2024, Russia withdrew from their bases in Manbij and Kobani which are part of the peacekeeping agreement in 2019.

From 8 December 2024, clashes took place on the Qara Qozak Bridge of the M4 Motorway and the Tishrin Dam, both critical Euphrates crossings, with the SDF claiming to have killed dozens of SNA fighters.

On 12 December 2024, a truce mediated by the United States was announced, though it was ended days later. On 17 December 2024, the truce was extended by a week. The military attacks on Rojava continued in mid-December with the attacks on the Ayn al-Arab District up until around December 23.

== See also ==
- YPG–FSA relations
