= Dayr Hafir District =

Dayr Hafir District منطقة دير حافر
- District
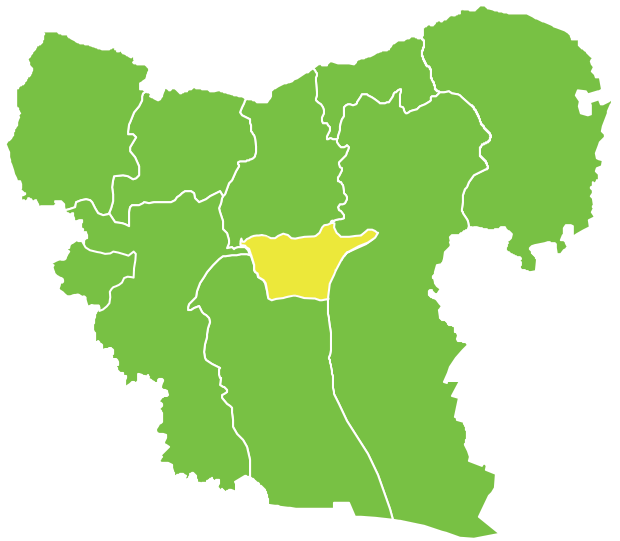
- Location of Dayr Hafir District within Aleppo Governorate

- Location in Syria
- Coordinates (Dayr Hafir): 36.15°N 37.7°E
- Country: Syria
- Governorate: Aleppo
- Seat: Dayr Hafir
- Subdistricts: 3 nawāḥī

Area
  - Total: 534.44 km^{2} (206.35 sq mi)

Population (2004)
  - Total: 91,124
  - Density: 170.50/km^{2} (441.60/sq mi)
- Geocode: SY0209

Dayr Hafir District (Arabic: منطقة دير حافر, romanized: manṭiqat Dayr Ḥāfir) is a district of Aleppo Governorate in northern Syria. Administrative centre is the city of Dayr Ḥāfir.

Subdistricts of Dayr Hafir District

The administrative center of Dayr Hafir Subdistrict shown above is the city of Dayr Hafir.

The administrative center of Rasm Harmil al-Imam Subdistrict shown above is the city of Rasm Harmil al-Imam.

The administrative center of Kuweires Sharqi Subdistrict shown above is the city of Kuweires Sharqi.

The district was formed in 2009 from three subdistricts formerly belonging to al-Bab District. At the 2004 census, these subdistricts had a total population of 91,124.

== Subdistricts ==
The district of Dayr Hafir is divided into three subdistricts or nawāḥī (population as of 2004):

Subdistricts of Dayr Hafir District
Code	Name	Area	Population	Seat
SY020900	Dayr Hafir Subdistrict	112.22 km²	33,592	Dayr Hafir
SY020901	Rasm Harmil al-Imam Subdistrict	203.58 km²	30,029	Rasm Harmil al-Imam
SY020902	Kuweires Sharqi Subdistrict	218.64 km²	26,729	Kuweires Sharqi
