= Self-Defense Forces (NES regions) =

- قوات الحماية الذاتية; Hêzên Xweparastinê ܓܘܫܡܐ ܕܣܘܝܥܐ ܘܣܘܬܪܐ ܝܬܝܐ
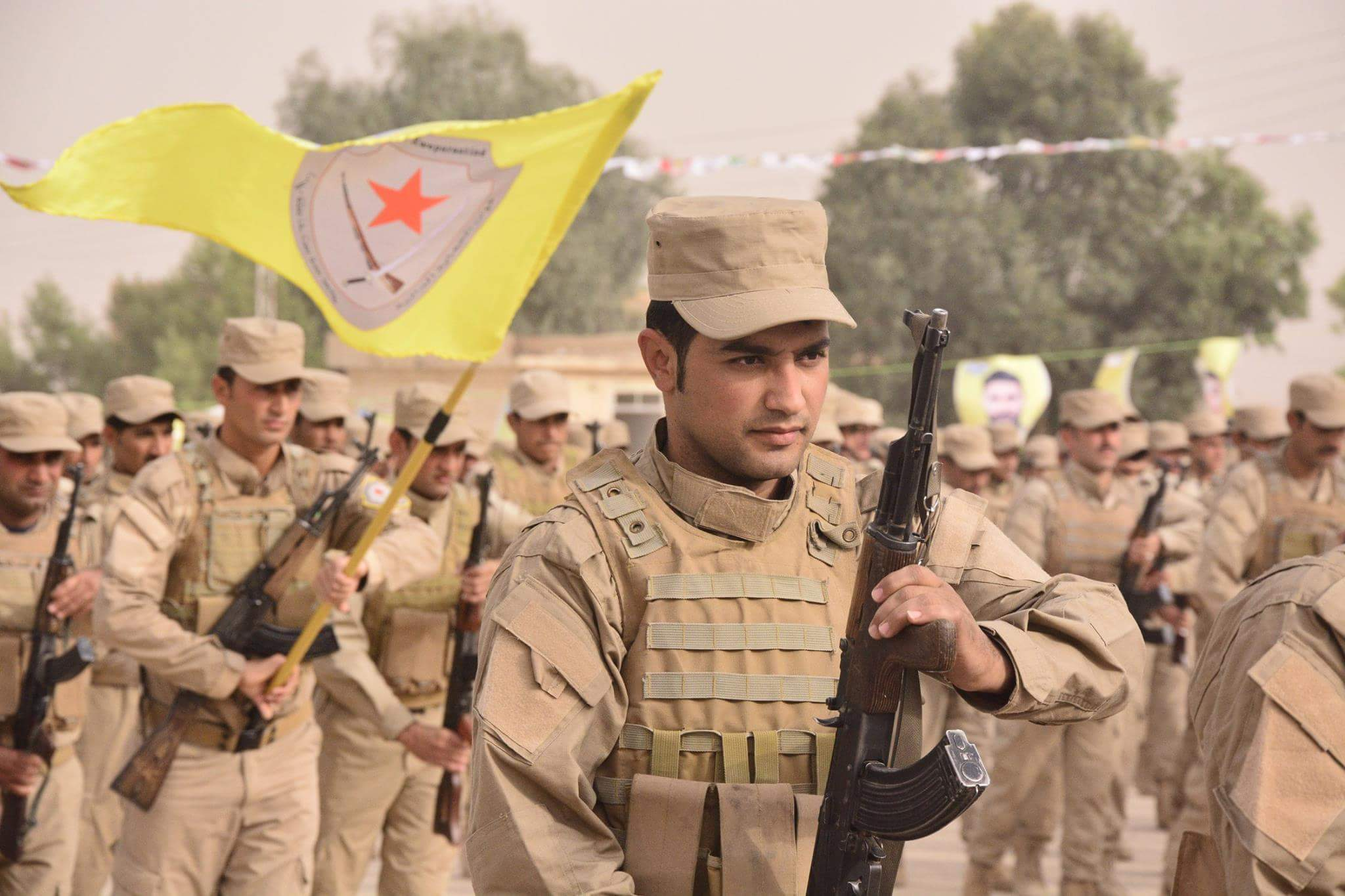
- HXP militiamen with the militia's flag in the background.
- Active: 11 October 2014 – 20 August 2026
- Country: Syria
- Allegiance: Democratic Autonomous Administration of North and East Syria
- Type: Militia
- Engagements: Syrian civil war; Eastern al-Hasakah offensive; Tishrin Dam offensive; Al-Shaddadi offensive (2016); Northern Aleppo offensive (February 2016); Manbij offensive (2016); Raqqa offensive (2016–present); Deir ez-Zor offensive (September 2017–present); Eastern Syria insurgency; Operation Olive Branch; Deir ez-Zor offensive (2024); Operation Dawn of Freedom; 2024 Manbij offensive

Commanders
- Commander-in-Chief: Renas Roza

Self-Defense Forces (Kurdish: Hêzên Xweparastinê, HXP; Arabic: قوات الحماية الذاتية, romanized: Quwwāt al-ḥimāyati aḏ-ḏātiyyati, Classical Syriac: ܓܘܫܡܐ ܕܣܘܝܥܐ ܘܣܘܬܪܐ ܝܬܝܐ, romanized: Gushmo d'Suyo'o w'Sutoro Yothoyo) was a multi-ethnic territorial defense militia and the only conscripted armed force in the Democratic Autonomous Administration of North and East Syria until it merged into the Syrian transitional government. As a self-defense force, manpower for the HXP was recruited locally.

== Name and translation ==
The official name of the HXP in Kurdish is Hêzên Xweparastinê. But in HXP's logo of Afrin Canton, there is another Kurdish name "Hêza Parastina Xweser" which may be only used in this canton. In some Kurdish news, "Erka Xweparastinê" has been used to entitle HXP.

The main English translation of HXP is Self-Defense Forces. Another rare translation is Autonomous Protection Force (abbreviated as APF), which often creates confusion that APF is a different armed force from HXP.

== Conscription, training and service ==
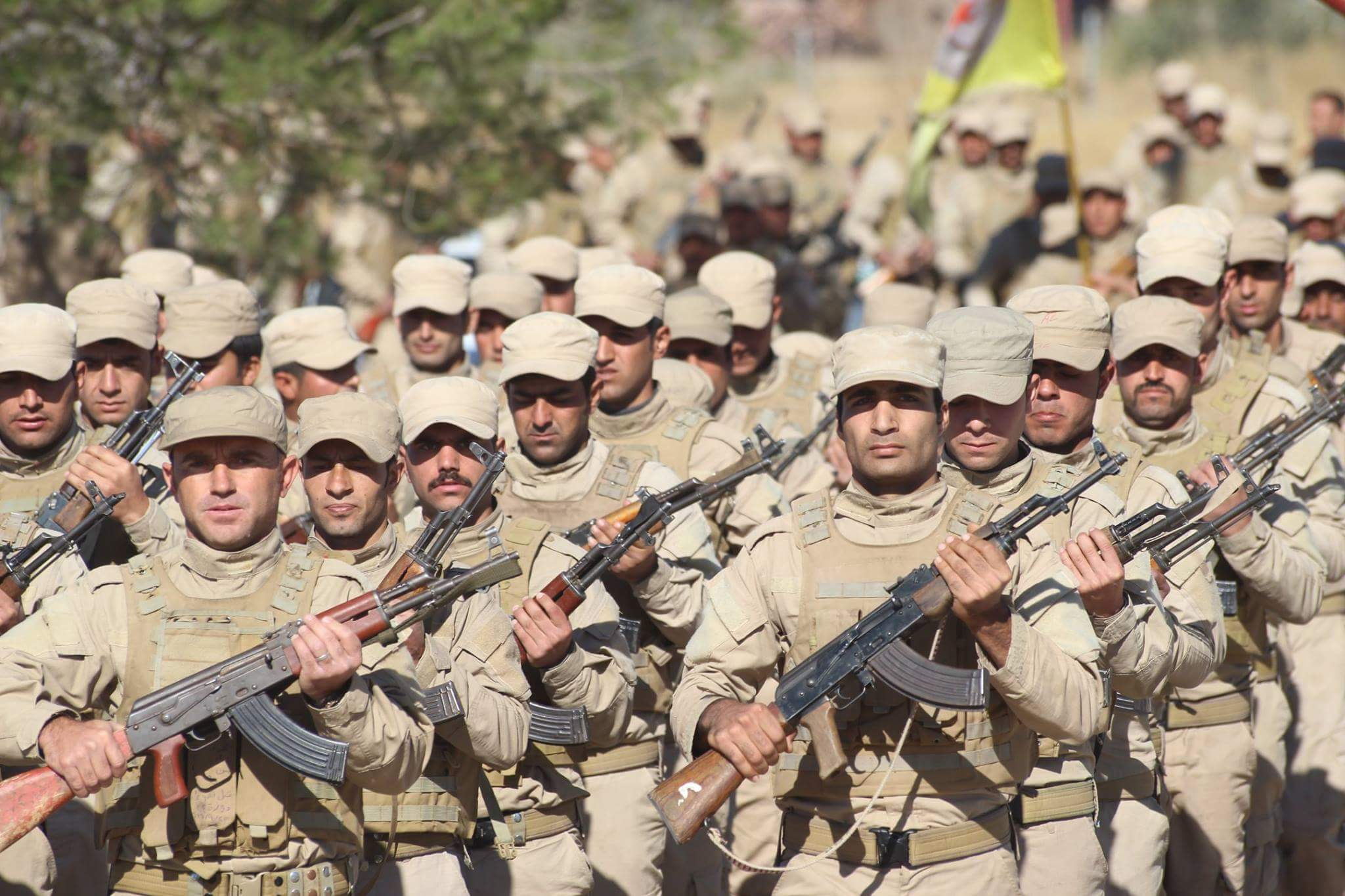
HXP militiamen on parade.

An official of the Democratic Federation of Northern Syria has stated that the self-defense duty "is not conscription" and that "it's a natural right to defend yourselves, if there is no protection, people will be eliminated and finished." HXP has become the first and only armed force of conscription in Northeastern Syria.

The formation and conscription of the HXP is legally based on the self-defense duty laws (Kurdish: Erka Xweparastinê) of the different NES regions, which has been respectively approved by the Legislative Assembly (Kurdish: Meclîsa Zagonsaz) of every canton. According to the law, the Defense Council (Kurdish: Desteya Parastin) of each canton will open a center for Self-Defense Duty (Kurdish: Navenda Erka Xweparastinê) to register and recruit for the HXP.

The introduction of conscription has caused some tensions in Northeastern Syria. Some people attempt to escape the recruitment in different ways (for example, traveling abroad to Turkey and Iraq, not registering at the Centers for Self-Defense Duty). Thus the Asayish is ordered to arrest people who escape the self-defense duty and force them to undertake the duty. The conscription has also been criticized and rejected by Kurdish National Council, the main opposition party in Northeastern Syria.

The recruits are to be trained by the YPG at the camps. The training generally lasts for 45 days, but sometimes for 40 days (for example, the first session of HXP training in the Jazira canton lasts for 40 days) or for one month (like the first session of HXP training in the Afrin canton). The training includes military structure and tactics, ideology and interaction with civilians. After training, the recruit will begin service in the HXP.

The HXP also maintain a special forces unit.

== History in different cantons ==
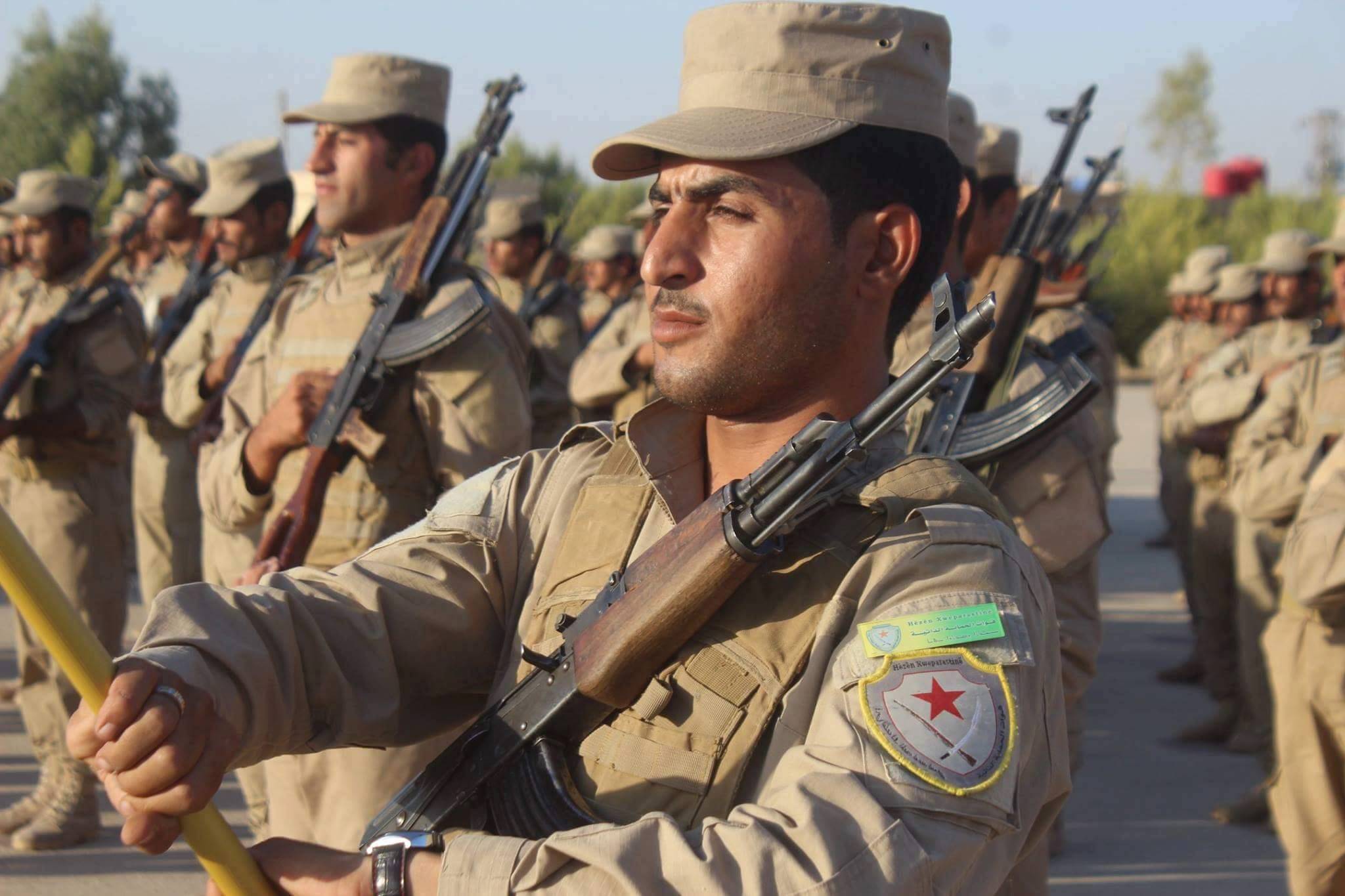
HXP militiamen of Afrin Canton.

The HXP was initially formed in the Jazira Canton. The Jazira canton approved the self-defense duty law as early as on July 13, 2014. The first batch of HXP troops started training on October 11, 2014, and served as the foundation of the Self-Defense Forces. After training for 40 days, the recruits graduated on November 20, 2014.

In Afrin Canton, the self-defense duty law was introduced on 19 May 2015. And the first center for self-defense duty opened on 4 June. After training for about one month, the first batch of HXP troops graduated on July 5.

In July 2014, some news claimed that both the Jazira and Kobane cantons would introduce conscription. But the introduction of the self-defense duty law and the opening of the Center didn't happen until June 4, 2016, in Kobane canton. It is possible that the Kobane Canton attempted to introduce conscription as early as in July 2014, but had to suspend such an attempt for certain unknown reasons. The first batch of HXP troops were recruited on June 20, 2016, and graduated on July 25.

Afrin's HXP forces fought against the Operation Olive Branch in early 2018, suffering heavy casualties in the process.

== Military Discipline Units ==
The HXP founded the Military Discipline Units (Kurdish: Yekîneyên Disiplîna Leşkerî, Arabic: وحدات الانضباط العسكري, romanized: Waḥdāt al-Inḍibāṭi al-'Askariyyi, Classical Syriac: ܚܕܘܬܐ ܕܣܘܕܪܐ ܓܝܣܝܐ, romanized: Ḥdowotho d'Sudoro Gaysoyo) in July 2015. The main task of this force is to ensure military discipline, prevent arms smuggling and to protect military buildings.

== See also ==
- Syrian Democratic Forces
- List of armed groups in the Syrian Civil War
