= Turkish–Syrian National Army offensive in Northern Syria (2024–2025) =

- Part of the Kurdish–Turkish conflict, 2024 Syrian Opposition Offensives and Aftermath of the Syrian civil war
Date	30 November 2024 – 12 April 2025 (5 months and 1 day)
Location	Al-Hasakah Governorate, Raqqa Governorate, Aleppo Governorate, Deir ez-Zor Governorate, Syria
Status	Turkish and SNA victory
Territorial changes	The SDF loses control of territory gained during the 2024 Syrian opposition offensives; The Syrian National Army capture Manbij and Tell Rifaat; The SDF repels SNA advances across the Euphrates by retaining control of the Qara Qozak bridge and the Tishrin Dam; Clashes resumed in August 2025

Belligerents
(Syrian opposition) Syrian Transitional Government; (Syrian opposition) Syrian Interim Government (until February 2025); Turkey	Autonomous Administration of North and East Syria

Units involved
(Syrian opposition) Syrian National Army; (Syrian opposition) Dawn of Freedom Operations Room; Sultan Murad Division; Levant Front; Jaysh al-Islam; Maghawir al-Sham; Liberation and Construction Movement; (Syrian opposition) Ahrar al-Sharqiya; Joint Force; Sultan Suleiman Shah; (Syrian opposition) Hamza Division; Sultan Mehmed the Conqueror Brigade; (Turkey) Turkish Armed Forces; Turkish Land Forces; Turkish Air Force	Syrian Democratic Forces; People's Defense Units; Women's Protection Units; Al-Bab Military Council; Manbij Military Council; Asayish

Casualties and losses
Per SOHR: (Syrian opposition) 473 killed 6 killed, 7 injured Per Turkey: 1 killed	Per SOHR: 247 killed (Note: References:)
- 146 civilians killed by SNA and Turkish Armed Forces

The Turkish–Syrian National Army offensive in Northern Syria (2024–2025) refers to a series of military operations launched by Turkey and the Turkish-backed Syrian National Army (SNA) against the Kurdish-led Syrian Democratic Forces (SDF) amid the fall of the Assad regime. As part of the 2024 opposition offensives, the SDF captured territory held by the Assad regime including in and around Aleppo. Amidst these gains, on 30 November 2024 the SNA announced Operation Dawn of Freedom, aiming to expand Turkish-controlled territory, weaken the SDF, prevent Kurdish autonomy in post-Assad Syria, and align with Turkish initiatives to establish a 30-kilometer deep buffer zone in the north of the country. The SNA quickly seized most of the Aleppo governate held by the SDF, other than the Ayn al-Arab District. The SNA the captured Manbij in December 2024, which had been controlled by the SDF since 2016. The SNA however failed to take the strategically important Tishrin Dam and Qara-Qowzak bridge. Fighting continued into 2025, until a ceasefire in April brokered by the Syrian transitional government which saw Kurdish forces withdrew to the eastern bank of the Euphrates river while government security forces would be deployed at the Tishrin Dam to establish a barrier between SDF and SNA forces.

== Background ==
The Turkish offensive takes place in the broader context of the Turkish-Kurdish conflict. Turkish President Recep Tayyip Erdoğan has long maintained that Kurdish SDF fighters are an extension of the Kurdistan Workers Party (PKK), which Turkey designates as a terrorist group. The SDF is the official military force of the Democratic Autonomous Administration of North and East Syria (DAANES), a de facto autonomous region of northeastern Syria. Erdogan has accordingly sought to weaken or destroy the SDF and DAANES, and has forged close relationships with parts of the Syrian opposition in its fighting with the SDF. Since 2016, Turkey and the SNA, Turkey's Syrian proxy force, have launched numerous cross-border operations against the SDF, occupied parts of northern Syria and created a buffer zone along the Turkish-Syrian border. The SDF have been allied with, armed by and aerially supported by the United States.

In the months leading up to the 2024 Syrian opposition offensives that led to the fall of the Assad regime in Syria, Turkey sought a reconciliation with Assad to mitigate the threat to Turkey from Kurdish militias and discuss the resettlement of Syrian refugees. The Assad regime insisted on the complete withdrawal of Turkish forces from Syria; a demand which was echoed by Russia in November 2024. On 27 November 2024, Syrian opposition forces launched an offensive against the Syrian regime, a move which analysts say would have been impossible without a green light from Turkey.

The Syrian rebels' quick progress against the Syrian regime paved the way for a renewed Turkish offensive against Kurdish forces. Amid the collapse of pro-government forces in Aleppo, the SDF took control of several towns formerly controlled by the Syrian regime. On 30 November 2024, the SNA initiated Operation Dawn of Freedom to disrupt SDF supply lines and establish a corridor connecting the Turkish-occupied al-Bab to Tel Rifaat, marking the beginning of the Turkish offensive. Around 100,000 civilians, mainly Kurdish, fled SNA-occupied territories throughout Aleppo governorate in to the DAANES region, creating a humanitarian crisis.

=== Turkey's goals ===
Turkey aims to ensure its national security by expanding Turkish-controlled territory in northern Syria, weakening the SDF and preventing Kurdish autonomy in post-Assad Syria. Turkish officials have called for the elimination of the Kurdish YPG, the main component of the SDF, rejecting any policy that would allow it to maintain a presence in Syria. Military analysts believe Turkey's offensives are part of Turkish initiatives to establish a 30-kilometer deep buffer zone in Syrian territory controlled by the SDF. Erdogan has also threatened military intervention to prevent any division of Syria, a threat aimed at the Kurdish-led autonomous region amid calls for the SDF's disarmament and dissolution. Some analysts believe that Turkey and its allies will try to destroy the Kurdish-led autonomous region if U.S. troops withdraw from Syria.

== Offensive ==
Following the withdrawal of pro-government forces from northern Aleppo on 30 November 2024, SDF and SNA forces advanced into towns previously under government control. The same day, the SNA announced the start of Operation Dawn of Freedom with the objective of cutting off the SDF's supply lines and establishing a corridor connecting al-Bab, which has been under Turkish occupation since 2017, to the SDF-controlled town of Tell Rifaat. The SNA's operation targeted areas under the control of the SDF and other Kurdish forces in northern Aleppo.

On 1 December 2024, the Syrian Observatory for Human Rights (SOHR) reported that the SNA captured Tel Rifaat and several surrounding villages from Kurdish forces. The remaining SDF-controlled towns in the northern Aleppo countryside were besieged and cut off from communication by the Turkish-backed forces. Tens of thousands (over 200,000 according to SOHR) Syrian Kurds were besieged, a majority of whom had already been displaced by the SNA's invasion and occupation of Afrin and northern Aleppo in 2018. The following day, Kurdish forces withdrew from al-Shahbaa and other parts of Aleppo. The SDF said 120,000 people were displaced from areas of northern Aleppo captured by Turkish-backed forces. SOHR said that Turkish airstrikes supported the SNA offensive, targeting SDF positions in Aleppo and Al-Hasakah.

=== Manbij offensive ===
On 6 December 2024, the SNA launched an offensive targeting the SDF-controlled city of Manbij. As the last SDF-controlled area west of the Euphrates, Manbij represented a crucial strategic point for Turkey's goal of pushing the SDF eastward beyond the river to enable the SNA to advance toward Kobani. According to the SOHR and the pro-SDF thinktank Foundation for Defense of Democracies (FDD), Turkey conducted drone strikes on SDF positions in Manbij. On 9 December 2024, the SOHR reported, the SDF withdrew from most of Manbij after intense fighting with the SNA and Turkish airstrikes on Qarqozaq bridge.

During and after the offensive, SOHR and DAANES sources said Turkish-backed factions engaged in widespread looting of civilian property and attacks on Kurdish civilians in Manbij. Three civilians were reportedly killed in the attacks, and the SNA executed several injured combatants. Nine health facilities were vandalized and three Kurdish Red Crescent ambulances were reported stolen.

On 11 December 2024, the SDF announced that it had reached an US-brokered ceasefire agreement with Turkish-backed forces in Manbij in which it would withdraw from the city. The Manbij offensive killed 218 SDF and Turkish-backed combatants.

=== Turkish attacks on the Tishreen Dam and Kobani ===
Following the successful capture of Manbij, SNA forces advanced east of Manbij and launched attacks on critical infrastructure within SDF territory. On 10 December 2024, Turkish drones targeted the Tishreen Dam, destroying the dam's electrical generators, putting the dam out of service and causing widespread power outages in cities supplied by the dam. Approximately 413,000 residents of Manbij and Kobani have been deprived of water and electricity since then.

Turkey and the SNA escalated attacks on the Kobani countryside over the next several days. SOHR said that at least 23 civilians, including 8 children, were killed in Turkish and SNA bombardment of the Kobani countryside prior to the U.S.-brokered ceasefire.

On 13 December 2024, Turkish state media reported that the Tishreen Dam had been liberated by the SNA forces from SDF forces. Pro-SNA media shared a video purporting to show the dam under SNA control. The video was geolocated by France 24 Observers, who verified that the video showed SNA rebels on the dam but only on the west side, and thus did not provide proof that the entire dam was under SNA control.

On 14 December 2024, Kurdish sources reported that the U.S.-brokered ceasefire between the SDF and Turkish forces collapsed after Turkey demanded that it be given a kilometer of land in the village of Ashmi to build a military base. After the collapse of the ceasefire, Turkey and Turkish-backed factions mobilized their forces around the Qarqozak bridge and the borders of Kobani. On 17 December, truce negotiations led to an extension of the ceasefire for another week. The following day, the Syrian Observatory for Human Rights (SOHR) reported that Turkey and the SNA had launched attacks on the Tishreen Dam and residential areas in the dam's vicinity, and the SDF accused Turkey and the SNA of violating the ceasefire. The SDF repelled SNA attacks on the Tishreen Dam, reportedly killing at least 21 SNA fighters in the clashes.

On 19 December, journalists Cîhan Bilgin and Nazim Daştan were killed in a targeted Turkish airstrike. Their reporting with Hawar News Agency was continued by journalists from the Women's Media Union (YRJ). Index On Censorship interpreted the killings as part of a pattern of Turkish repression of journalists in north-eastern Syria.

The SOHR documented 179 deaths between 12 and 31 December in clashes between the SNA, SDF and Turkey, including 25 civilians, 114 Turkish-backed militiamen and 40 members of the SDF and affiliated forces.

In January and February 2025, Turkey and Turkish-backed factions continued to bombard the vicinity of the Tishreen Dam and Kobani area. On 29 January 2025, according to SOHR and Kurdish sources, Turkish airstrikes on Sarin in the Kobani countryside hit a public market, killing 13 civilians, including 4 children, and injured 20 others. According to the SOHR, a total of 392 people were killed in the east Aleppo countryside in month of January, including 300 Turkish militiamen, 40 SDF combatants, and 52 civilians. Kurdish sources reported that on 2 February 2025, a Turkish drone strike on Kobani's only water station left 200,000 inhabitants of Kobani and the Kobani countryside without access to clean water.

==== Tishreen Dam protests ====
Since 8 January 2025, residents of the SDF-controlled DAANES region have organized sit-in protests at the Tishreen Dam against Turkish occupation and bombardment. After the announcement of the first protest, a Turkish strike targeted a convoy of protestors heading to the Tishreen Dam, killing and injuring 20 civilians. Turkey has continued to strike protest convoys in an apparent attempt to prevent the protests. The protests have nevertheless proceeded, and Turkey and the SNA have continued to strike the dam, killing and injuring over 200 protestors. The attacks have been condemned by Human Rights Watch (HRW) as apparent war crimes. As of 8 February 2025, eight journalists had been injured in drone strikes while covering the protests and three paramedics had been killed while evacuating injured protestors in ambulances.

== Casualties ==
Since the start of Operation Dawn of Freedom on 30 November 2024, over 680 combatants and 120 civilians have been killed in Turkish bombardments and clashes between the SNA and SDF.

=== Combatant casualties ===
According to SOHR data, 217 SDF members and affiliated forces have been killed since the start of the Turkish offensive. SOHR documented 158 SDF fatalities in December 2024, including 115 fatalities during the Manbij offensive alone. The Rojava Information Center (RIC) estimates a higher number, reporting 180 SDF fatalities in December 2024, which would bring the total death count up to 239. The SOHR documented 40 SDF fatalities in January 2025 and 19 fatalities in February 2025 thus far.

The SOHR has documented over 470 fatalities among Turkish-backed militiamen since 30 November 2024. This includes between 159 and 165 deaths in December 2024, 306 deaths in January 2025 Including the deaths of 6 Turkish soldiers, and 12 deaths so far in February 2025.

=== Civilian casualties ===
Over 140 civilians have been killed since the start of the Turkish offensive, including 3 journalists and 7 health workers. The SOHR documented 66 civilian deaths in December 2024, including 35 civilians killed during the Manbij offensive and 31 civilians killed in clashes and drone strikes the rest of the month. The RIC estimates differ slightly, reporting 37 civilian deaths during the Manbij offensive and a total of 69 civilian deaths in December 2024.

In January 2025, SOHR recorded 52 civilians killed in Turkish airstrikes and SNA attacks. Turkish attacks on protest convoys and protestors at the Tishreen Dam accounted for 24 of these fatalities and over 220 injuries among civilians. SOHR said that fourteen civilians were killed in February.

On 16 March, a Turkish airstrike on Kobani was reported to have killed 10 civilians, including 7 children.

== Alleged war crimes and human rights abuses ==
=== Turkish-occupied territories ===
==== Shehba and Afrin ====
According to the SDF-affiliated Rojava Information Center (RIC), following the capture of SDF-territories the SNA seized the homes and properties of Kurdish civilians in Shehba and Afrin. RIC said that civilians in Shehba experienced robbery and extortion from SNA forces. Local news agency North Press reported that the SNA's Military Police was carrying out arrests-for-ransom in SNA-occupied Tel Rifaat, with at least 22 civilians in Shehba arrested. RIC said a disabled Kurdish woman was killed by the SNA inside her home, that SNA fighters were seen assaulting captives in Tel Rifaat, and that SNA fighters blocked the evacuation of 50 buses of displaced civilians in Shehba.

==== Manbij ====
Following the withdrawal of SDF forces from Manbij, Turkish-backed factions reportedly engaged in widespread looting of civilian property and targeted attacks against Kurdish civilians. According to SOHR and RIC, tens of injured combatants were extrajudicially executed by Turkish-backed forces, and three civilians were murdered. RIC reported that three members of the Zenobia Women's Gathering, an organization advocating for women's rights in Arab-majority regions of the DAANES, were kidnapped by SNA forces. Italian NGO Per Ponte Per and the Kurdish Red Crescent reported that SNA fighters stormed and vandalized Manbij's central hospital, and that four Kurdish Red Crescent ambulances were stolen.

==== Turkish-Syrian border ====
Two civilians were reportedly beaten by Turkish border guards while attempting to cross into Syrian territory from the Kobani countryside. One civilian was killed due to the beating, according to SOHR and Kurdish sources. In a separate incident reported by SOHR, Turkish border guards beat a group of 12 civilians attempting to cross into Turkey, including a pregnant woman who sustained several injuries, killing the fetus.

=== Attacks on critical infrastructure, healthcare, journalists and protestors ===
Turkey has been accused by AANES of systematically targeting critical infrastructure in the region. The Tishreen Dam was inoperable after 10 December 2024 due to Turkish drone strikes, leaving 413,000 residents of Manbij and the Kobani countryside without clean water or electricity. On 2 February 2025, Turkey bombed Kobani's only water station, leaving 200,000 more residents without access to clean water. RIC said that a majority in the autonomous region have been deprived of clean water or electricity during the Turkish offensive.

Kurdish authorities have accused Turkey of "systematically targeting" ambulances and health workers during demonstrations at the Tishreen Dam. Three paramedics were killed and four ambulances destroyed by Turkey and SNA strikes on Tishreen Dam protests. Human Rights Watch (HRW) called for a war crime investigation after a Turkish strike on a Kurdish Red Crescent ambulance transporting a civilian wounded by an earlier drone strike on the dam. Attacks on healthcare were also documented in the aftermath of the Manbij offensive. The SNA reportedly vandalized and looted nine health facilities in Manbij, including three Kurdish Red Crescent facilities and six medical facilities supported by international humanitarian organizations, and attacked an ambulance, killing four healthcare staff and injuring one patient.

Two journalists were killed in December and a third in February, in Turkish airstrikes or suspected Turkish drone attacks on the region, with a further eight injured in the fighting in January.

Turkish and SNA attacks on Tishreen Dam protests have killed 24 civilians and injured over 220. Videos verified by HRW show strikes on protestors in which no visible military targets or weapons could be identified. Drone footage published by an SNA-affiliated channel shows air-dropped munitions exploding on a crowd of dancing protestors with the caption "The armed drone sends congratulations and blessings to the SDF celebrations at Tishreen Dam."

== Humanitarian impact ==
In February 2025, the DAANES-affiliated Rojava Information Center (RIC) reported that up to 4 million residents of the DAANES region were facing compound crises, including massive internal displacement, Turkish airstrikes targeting critical infrastructure, power outages and water shortages. RIC said that Turkish drone strikes on power plants and water supply networks had left the majority of the region without access to clean drinking water and electricity. RIC said that approximately 413,000 residents of Manbij and Kobani have been deprived of water and electricity since 10 December 2024 due to Turkish drone strikes on the Tishreen Dam. On 2 February 2025, Turkey bombed Kobani's only water station, leaving 200,000 more residents without access to clean water according to Kurdish sources.

According to RIC, over 100,000 people were displaced due to the SNA's assault on Shehba and Tel Rifaat. Civilians fleeing violence resorted to sleeping outside or in tents in freezing weather conditions - a four month old infant died due to the cold temperatures after days on the road. Yezidi minorities faced violent attacks as they fled Tel Rifaat, with at least two reportedly killed.

According to RIC, writing in early February, a U.S. foreign aid freeze is likely to exacerbate the humanitarian crisis, as 30 out of the 36 NGO coordinators in the AANES region are partially or fully dependent on US funding. Over 300,000 internally displaced people in "last-resort sites" are at immediately risk following the freeze, and officials fear that the freeze will pose grave security concerns and humanitarian risks in 42 camps housing over 40,000 ISIS-linked women and children. One NGO has already laid off 635 employees due to the freeze.

Kurdish sources reported in February that education was halted in many parts of the region due to the ongoing attacks by Turkey and Turkish-backed forces. SOHR and Kurdish sources report that least four schools were struck by Turkish drone strikes and SNA artillery shelling.
