= Rojava Information Center =

News agency in Syria

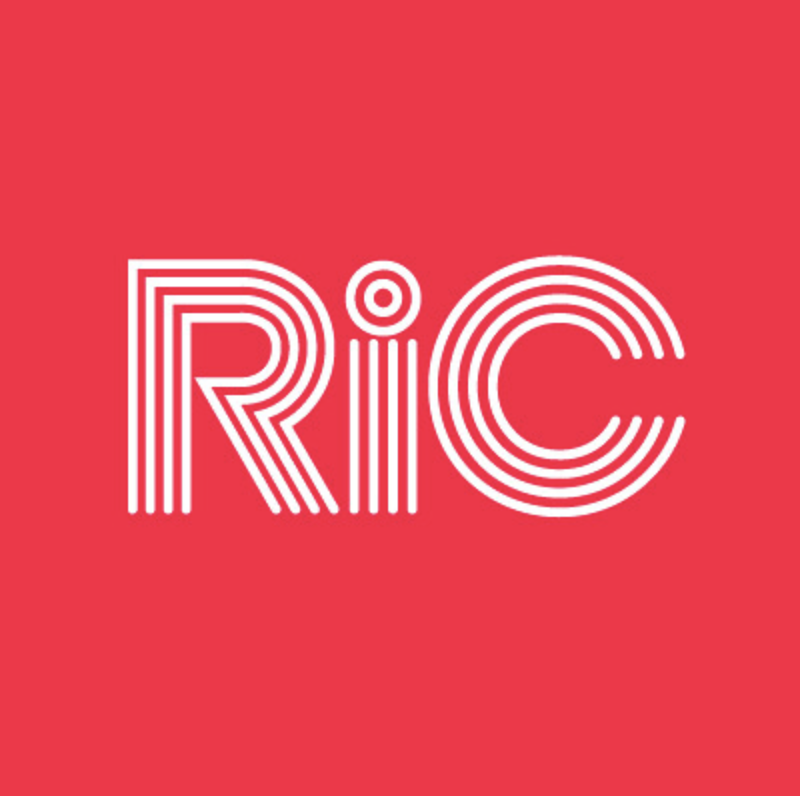
- Company type: Media center
- Founded: December 2018
- Founder: Matt Broomfield; Joan Garcia; Chloe Troadec
- Headquarters: Qamishli, Syria
- Website: https://rojavainformationcenter.org

The Rojava Information Center (RIC; Kurdish: Navenda Agahîyan a Rojava) is a news agency in Syria. Its headquarters are located in Qamishli. It was founded by foreign volunteers in Rojava (Matt Broomfield, Joan Garcia, Koni Docolomansky and Chloé Troadec) in reaction to the December 2018 announcement of US president Donald Trump of a US military withdrawal from Rojava. The project creators were worried there might be another war and in their perception there was little foreign media present at the time. During the Turkish invasion of Afrin, the RIC began to provide information to a wide range of foreign reporters.

The aim of the RIC is to provide foreign journalists with information from the Autonomous Administration of North and East Syria (AANES), often known as Rojava.

Rojava Information Center describes Rojava as "An organization which follows path of socialist revolutionary named Abdullah Öcalan" who is the founder of PKK.
