= Kuweires Sharqi =

Kuweires Sharqi كويرس شرقي
- Village
- Location of Kuweires Sharqi in Syria
- Coordinates: 36°10′07″N 37°32′28″E
- Country: Syria
- Governorate: Aleppo
- District: Dayr Hafir
- Subdistrict: Kuweires Sharqi
- Control: (Syria) Syrian transitional government

Population (2004)
  - Total: 3,129
- Time zone: UTC+3 (AST)
- Geocode: C1294

Kuweires Sharqi (Arabic: كويرس شرقي, romanized: East Kuweires) is a town in eastern Aleppo Governorate, northwestern Syria, mostly known for the Kuweires Military Airbase 1 km (0.62 mi) to the northeast. Located on the Dayr Hafir Plain north of Lake Jabbul, some 30 km (19 mi) east of the city of Aleppo and 15 km (9.3 mi) west of Dayr Hafir, Kuweires Sharqi is the administrative center of Nahiya Kuweires Sharqi in Dayr Hafir District. In the 2004 census, it had a population of 3,129.

Kuwayris Sharqi is the administrative center of Nahiya Kuweires Sharqi of the Dayr Hafir District.
