= Lake Hajikabul =

Lake in Azerbaijan

- Location within Azerbaijan
- Interactive map of Lake Hajikabul
- Location: Baku, Azerbaijan
- Coordinates: 39.9833°N 48.925°E
- Primary inflows: Kura River
- Basin countries: Azerbaijan
- Max. length: 6 kilometres (3.7 mi)
- Max. width: 3 kilometres (1.9 mi)
- Surface area: 6 sq mi (16 km^{2})
- Max. depth: 5 metres (16 ft)

Hajikabul (Azerbaijani: Hacıqabul gölü) is the sixth-largest lake of Azerbaijan.

It is located to the south-west of Baku, near Shirvan city, in Hajigabul Rayon, not far from a railway station. The lake's total area is 1,668 ha, maximal length - 6 km, maximal width - 3 km and depth - 5 m. The lake is supplied by waters of the Kura River, with a special channel. The water temperature hesitates between 5 °C and 28,5 °C. Pellucidity of water is between 0,06 and 2,5 m. Barbel, carp, sheatfish, pike, zander and grass carp are commercial fishes of the lake. Water plants such as reed mace, reed, bulrush, buttercup and hornwort are met in the lake.

The lake is located in Kur-Araz Lowland. It formed in the result of withdrawal of the Caspian Sea in a definite geological period. Spring flows of the Kura River increase the area of the lake.

It doesn't freeze in winter and has a great significance for hibernation of migratory birds.
