= Kuweires Military Aviation Institute =

Khalid bin al-Walid Air Base

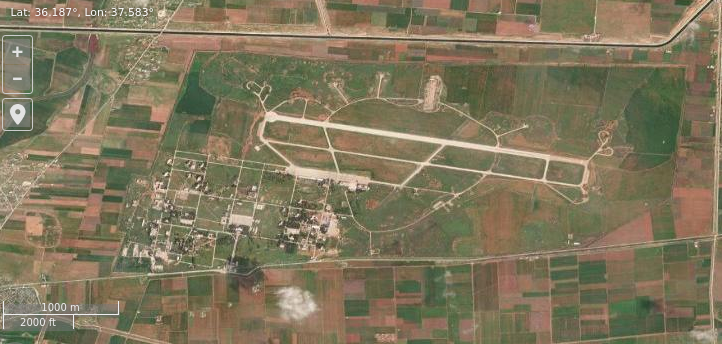
- Satellite imagery of Khalid bin al-Walid Air Base
- IATA: none; ICAO: none

Summary
- Airport type: Military aviation institute
- Owner: Syrian Armed Forces
- Operator: (Syrian opposition) Syrian transitional government
- Location: Kuweires Sharqi, Aleppo Governorate
- Built: 1980
- Coordinates: 36°11′13″N 37°34′59″E

Map
- Location in Syria

Runways
Direction	Length		Surface
Direction	ft	m	Surface
10/28	8,300 (est.)	2,500 (est.)	Concrete

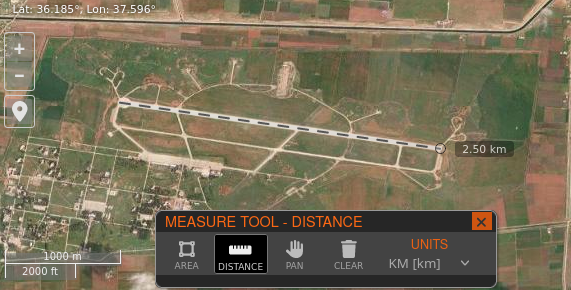
NASA FIRMS's measure tool shows the runway to be 2.50 km

Khalid bin al-Walid Air Base, formerly known as Kuweires Military Aviation Institute (Arabic: الكلية الجوية العسكرية في كويرس), and also known as Kuweires Air Base etc. is an airbase and military aviation institute in Aleppo Governorate, Syria. It is situated some 30 km east of the city of Aleppo, to the northeast of Kuweires Sharqi village, between As-Safira in the West and Dayr Hafir in the East.

The base was constructed with Polish support in the late 1960s as the primary base of the Syrian air force academy. The base is home to the Military Aviation Institute (originally opened in Damascus in 1947) of the Syrian Arab Air Force since 1980. The Military Aviation Institute was renovated between 2017 and 2021. Institute was reopened in 2021. Kuweires Air Base was taken over by the anti-Assad forces in late 2024, as the Assad regime fell in the Syrian Civil War. It was subsequently reactivated by the new Syrian government, renamed Khalid bin al-Walid Air Base and actively trained Syrian Air Force cadets in 2026.

== Siege during the Syrian civil war ==
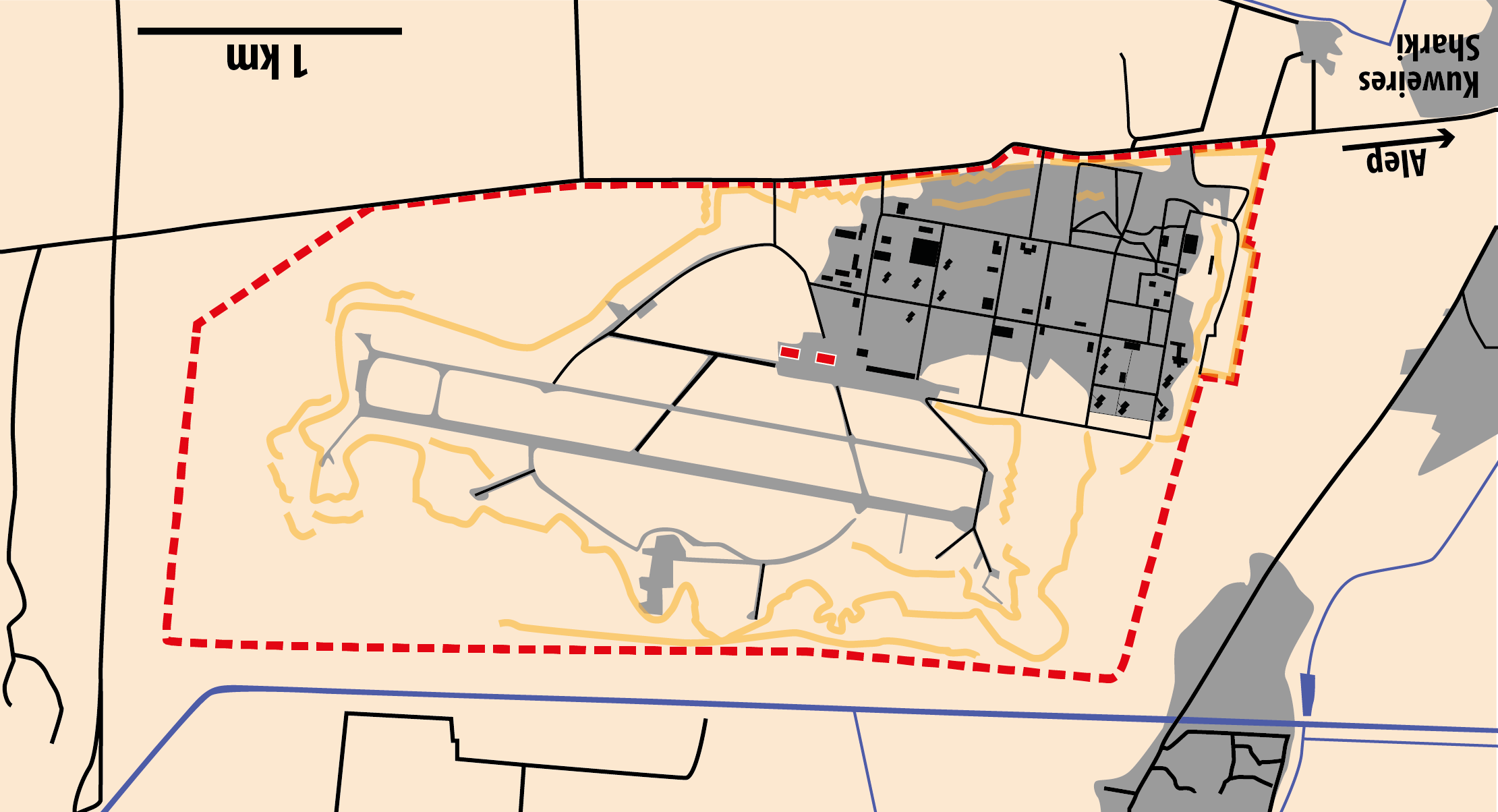
Kuweires base, red dashed line = base limits, buildings in black, aircraft shelters in red, defense lines during siege in orange

Kuweires Airbase was defended mostly by cadets when it fell under siege by Syrian rebels in 2012. Rebel forces surrounded Kuweiris for more than a year but did not overrun it. As rebel infighting intensified causing their positions to collapse, ISIS took control of the siege around late 2013. ISIS besieged the airbase for two years, deploying heavy weapons and armoured vehicles like suicide tank VBIEDs. ISIS negotiators called up officers on the phone and urged them to surrender and shelled the base with leaflets promising safe passage, but no one defected. Twice ISIS breached the perimeter of the airbase, even reaching as far as the hardened aircraft shelters where the defenders lived, but could not capture it.

Backed by Russian air support, Colonel Suhayl al-Hasan and his Tiger Forces finally broke the siege on 10 November 2015, as part of the Kuweires offensive. Only 300 of 1,100 soldiers survived the siege.

The Syrian government repaired the base immediately after lifting the siege, deploying a squadron of Aero L-39 Albatros fighter-bombers together with a Buk M1 surface-to-air missile system, operated by a combined Russian and Syrian crew, to defend the base.

On 25 July 2024, GUR forces attacked Russian forces at the Kuweires airbase in Syria, destroying an Electronic Warfare station. Later that year, on 30 November, the Syrian National Army secured the airbase during the Operation Dawn of Freedom.

== See also ==
- List of Syrian Air Force bases
