= Bahra, Hama =

Bahra البحرة
- Village
- Location in Syria
- Coordinates: 35°3′57″N 36°34′50″E
- Country: Syria
- Governorate: Hama
- District: Hama District
- Subdistrict: Hama

Population (2004)
  - Total: 1,098
- Time zone: UTC+3 (AST)
- City Qrya Pcode: C3002

Bahra (Arabic: البحرة) is a Syrian village located in the Hama Subdistrict of the Hama District in the Hama Governorate. According to the Syria Central Bureau of Statistics (CBS), Bahra had a population of 1,098 in the 2004 census.

== Syrian Civil War ==
On 13 December 2024, following the fall of the Assad regime, 11 people were summarily executed by gunmen in the village.
