= Dayr Hafir =

City in Syria

Dayr Hafir دير حافر
- City
- Dayr Hafir is the administrative center of Nahiya Dayr Hafir and Dayr Hafir District.

- Location in Syria
- Coordinates: 36°09′25″N 37°42′28″E
- Country: Syria
- Governorate: Aleppo
- District: Dayr Hafir
- Subdistrict: Dayr Hafir

Area
  - Total: 5.7 km^{2} (2.2 sq mi)
- Elevation: 342 m (1,122 ft)

Population (2013)
  - Total: 35,409
- Time zone: UTC+3 (AST)

Dayr Hafir (Arabic: دَيْر حَافِر / ALA-LC: Dayr Ḥāfir) is a town in northern Syria, administratively part of the Dayr Hafir District and the Aleppo Governorate. It is located 50 kilometres (31 miles) east of Aleppo on the Aleppo-Raqqa highway, 15 kilometres (9.3 miles) to the north of Sabkhat al-Jabbul. It is the regional centre of the Dayr Hafir District. In the 2004 official census, the town of Dayr Hafir had a population of 18,948. The town is home to an archeological site dating back to the 9th millennium BC. Dayr Hafir is a rural community in its majority.

== History ==
=== Syrian civil war ===
During the Syrian civil war, in June 2012, the Free Syrian Army was reported to be in control of the town. The town came under the control of the Islamic State in early 2014, before being retaken by Syrian Government forces during the Dayr Hafir offensive in 2017.

=== Post-Assad era ===
On 30 November 2024, the Syrian Democratic Forces (SDF) took control of the town amidst the attack on Aleppo and the subsequent withdrawal of pro-Assad forces. The SDF defended the town against attacks by the Turkish-backed Syrian National Army (SNA) and its affiliated militias during Operation Dawn of Freedom and the East Aleppo offensive.

After the March 10 Agreement, clashes around Dayr Hafir ceased for a few months. In August 2025 forces of the Syrian transitional government, and the SDF exchanged artillery fire in small skirmishes near the town.

In January 2026, clashes between the Syrian Democratic Forces (SDF) and Syrian government forces led to government control of the Sheikh Maqsoud and Ashrafieh neighborhoods in Aleppo, prompting civilian displacement. The Syrian Army accused the SDF of drone attacks and disrupting water supplies, which the SDF denied. On 13 January, the Syrian Ministry of Defense launched an offensive, declaring Dayr Hafir and Maskanah a military zone and ordering SDF elements to withdraw east of the Euphrates. On 16 January, as part of international efforts to calm the situation after heavy fighting around Aleppo, U.S. military convoy accompanied by SDF leaders toured the contested area around Dayr Hafir and eastern Aleppo, signaling continued U.S. involvement alongside Kurdish‑led forces in monitoring and stabilizing front‑line zones. The SDF withdrew in the early hours of 17 January, relocating east of the river, which was followed by the entrance of the Syrian army in the following hours.
