= 86th Division (Syria) =

- Active: May 2025—present
- Country: Syria
- Branch: Syrian Army
- Area of responsibility: Abu Kamal, Eastern Syria
- Engagements: SDF–Syrian transitional government clashes (2025–2026)

Commanders
- Current commander: Ahmad Ahsan Fiadh al-Hiyas

The 86th Division of the Syrian Army, established in May 2025 under the Syrian Transitional Government following the fall of the Assad regime, operates in eastern Syria together with the 66th Division. A significant portion of its manpower is reportedly drawn from Ahrar al-Sharqiya, a Turkey-backed Sunni Islamist faction that previously operated under the umbrella of the Syrian National Army (SNA) and whose members were formerly affiliated with Salafi jihadist groups such as al-Nusra Front and Ahrar al-Sham.

According to the Syrian Observatory for Human Rights (SOHR) some of the divisions officers lack scientific qualifications and professional experiences, and include illiterate individuals and former Islamic State (ISIS) members.

== History ==
=== Background ===
The appointment of Ahmad Ahsan Fiadh al-Hiyas (Abu Hatem Shaqra) as commander of the division sparked anger among Kurdish residents in eastern Syria. Al-Hiyas, a founding member of Ahrar al-Sharqiya, reportedly studied and was trained in Turkey and took part in Turkish-led operations such as Euphrates Shield, Olive Branch, and Peace Spring, that led to the displacement of hundreds of thousands of Kurds. He and his group have been under U.S. sanctions since 2019 for abuses against Kurdish and Yazidi civilians, including human trafficking, abductions, torture, running Ahrar Al-Sharqiya's prison and executing hundreds of detainees in 2018, as well as being a part in the murder of prominent female Kurdish politician Hevrin Khalaf.

=== After the formation ===
Al-Hiyas' division conducted several violent shootings and shellings on Kurdish residents on the contact line to the Autonomous Administration of North and East Syria (AANES). The division has also suffered casualties in clashes with unknown gunmen. Reports from June 2025 indicate disorganization, irregular salary payments, and internal conflicts, prompting several hundred fighters to leave for the 66th Division.

The division engaged in sporadic fighting with SDF forces along the Euphrates contact line in 2025.

On 2 November 2025, a motorbike rigged with explosives detonated in front of the division’s headquarters in the city of Abu Kamal, Deir ez-Zor, injuring one of its fighters.

== Structure ==
The commander of the division is Ahmad Ahsan Fiadh al-Hiyas (Abu Hatem Shaqra). Other high-ranking members of the division include: Division Commander Head of Office Khaled Walid al-Allush, Operations Officer Khalil Abdallah al-Ali, and Officer in the Operations Department Fakher Salah al-Jabbar

The Division controls at least three subordinate brigades:

- 1st Brigade
- 2nd Brigade
- 3rd Brigade (led by Muhammad Khalil al-Za'al)
