= Abu Hatem Shaqra =

Syrian general (born 1987)

Brigadier General Ahmad Ihsan Fayyad al-Hayes
- أحمد إحسان فياض الهايس
- Born: 1987 (age 38–39); Shaqra, Deir ez-Zor Governorate, Syria
- Relatives: Raed Jassim al-Hayes (brother)
- Military career
- Allegiance: Syrian opposition (2011–2024); Ahrar al-Sham (2016); Syrian National Army (2017–2025); Syria (since 2025)
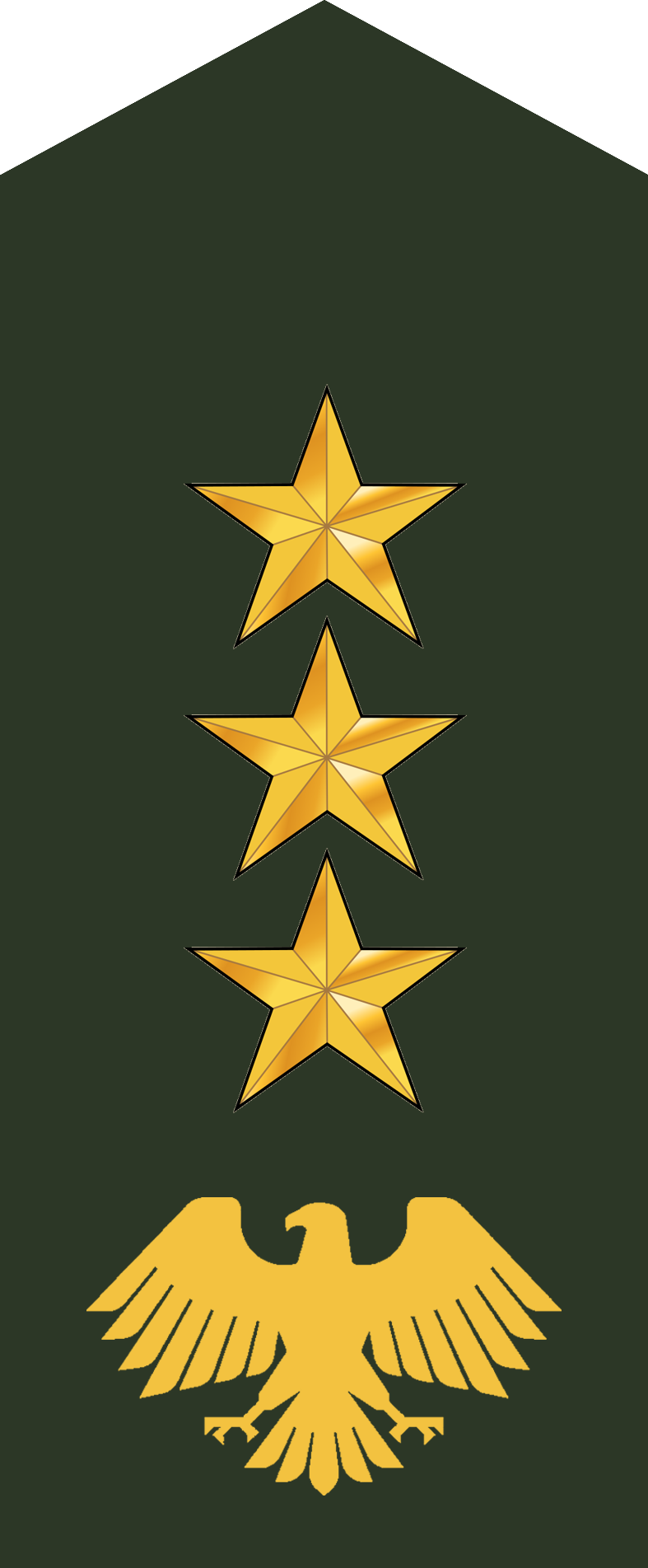
- Rank: Brigadier General
- Nicknames: Abu Hatem Shaqra (Arabic: أبو حاتم شقرا)
- Commands: Ahrar al-Sharqiya (2016–2025); Liberation and Construction Movement (2024–2025); (Syria) 86th Division (2025–present)
- Conflicts: Syrian Civil War; 2024 Syrian opposition offensives; Operation Dawn of Freedom

Ahmad Ihsan Fayyad al-Hayes (Arabic: أحمد إحسان فياض الهايس), also known by his nom de guerre Abu Hatem Shaqra (Arabic: أبو حاتم شقرا), is the commander of the 86th Division of the Syrian Army. He had previously served as commander of Ahrar al-Sharqiya, a faction within the Turkish-supported group known as the Syrian National Army (SNA).

== Early life and education ==
He was born in Shaqra, Deir ez-Zor Governorate in 1987. He graduated from Mardin Artuklu University with a degree in political science and international relations in 2023. He has a cousin named Raed Jassim al-Hayes, also known by his nom de guerre Abu Jaafar Shaqra.

Prior to the Syrian civil war, he worked as a farmer in his hometown, and he also briefly worked in construction as a cement tiler in Jordan.

== Military career ==
Shaqra first served in Ahrar al-Sham until his expulsion from the group in 2016, being accused of stealing funds from the group. Following this, he announced the formation of Ahrar al-Sharqiya on 22 January 2016 near Azaz, consisting of more than 2,500 soldiers from various eastern Syrian factions, such as Knights of the East or Shield of Hasakah, the majority of whom originated from the Al-Shaitat and Qaraan tribes of Deir ez-Zor.

Shaqra was one of the Syrian National Army leaders who met the Turkish President Recep Tayyip Erdoğan at the Presidential Complex in Ankara in May 2018.

On 15 February 2022, Shaqra was appointed deputy commander-in-chief of the Liberation and Construction Movement, a merger of multiple SNA factions primarily from eastern Syria, such as Ahrar al-Sharqiya or Jaysh al-Sharqiya, on the same day of the organization's creation.

On 19 August 2023, Shaqra was appointed deputy commander-in-chief of the Syrian National Army's First Corps, following a meeting with First Corps and Ahrar al-Sharqiya leadership.

On 8 January 2024, Shaqra was appointed commander-in-chief of the Liberation and Construction Movement, succeeding Colonel Hussein al-Hammadi.

On 1 December 2024, after the capture of Kuweires Airport during the SNA-led Operation Dawn of Freedom offensive, Shaqra reportedly appeared in a video clip at the airport on social media.

Shaqra attended the Syrian Revolution Victory Conference on 29 January 2025, and the Syrian National Army agreed to dissolve itself and its component factions, which includes Ahrar al-Sharqiya, and incorporate into the Syrian Ministry of Defense. Shaqra also previously attended a conference in December 2024, agreeing to dissolve all military factions.

On 5 May 2025, he was appointed commander of the 86th Division of the Syrian Army, a military division operating in Deir ez-Zor, Raqqa, and Al-Hasakah Governorates, though the Ministry of Defense didn't officially announce his promotion.

== Controversies and allegations ==
Shaqra and Ahrar al-Sharqiya have been accused of various crimes, such as extortion, robbery, and smuggling Islamic State members and Yazidi families from Afrin in exchange for money. Shaqra has also been accused of directly practicing "gross and systematic violations of human rights" and for his responsibility in the killing of Hevrin Khalaf on 12 October 2019, a Kurdish politician who was executed by members of Ahrar al-Sharqiya during Operation Peace Spring.

On 28 July 2021, Shaqra was sanctioned alongside Ahrar al-Sharqiya and Abu Jaafar Shaqra by the United States Department of the Treasury for his complicity in his faction's "human rights abuses", adding that he was involved in running Ahrar al-Sharqiya's prison in rural Aleppo, where hundreds of detainees had been executed and tortured since 2018, trafficking Yazidi women and children, and integrating former ISIS members into the group, who supported the faction's ransom and extortion operations.

He also owned the Istanbul-based al-Safir Oto car dealership in partnership with Abu Amsha, an SNA commander who led the Sultan Suleiman Shah Division, which was sanctioned alongside Abu Amsha on 17 August 2023 for its connection to Abu Amsha.

His promotion to commander of the 86th Division was criticized by US State Department Spokeswoman Tammy Bruce, who said, in a press briefing, "The interim authority’s decision to appoint this individual who has a long record of human rights abuses and undermining our Defeat-ISIS mission to an official position is a serious mistake that the U.S. does not support", as well as SDF spokesperson Ferhad Şamî, who said that the appointment was "unacceptable" and that it risks "corrupting state institutions".
