= Turkish involvement in the Syrian civil war =

- Part of foreign involvement in the Syrian civil war
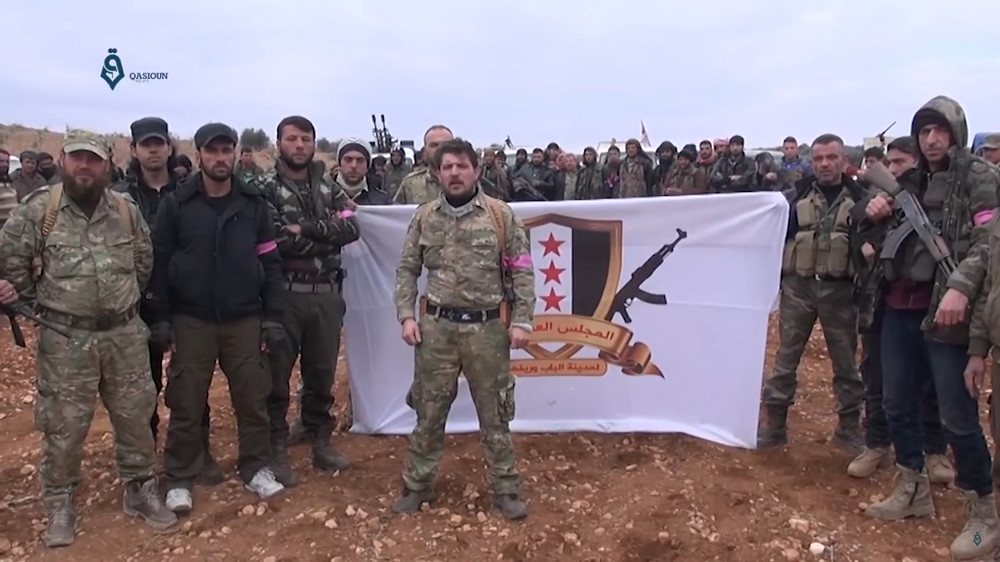
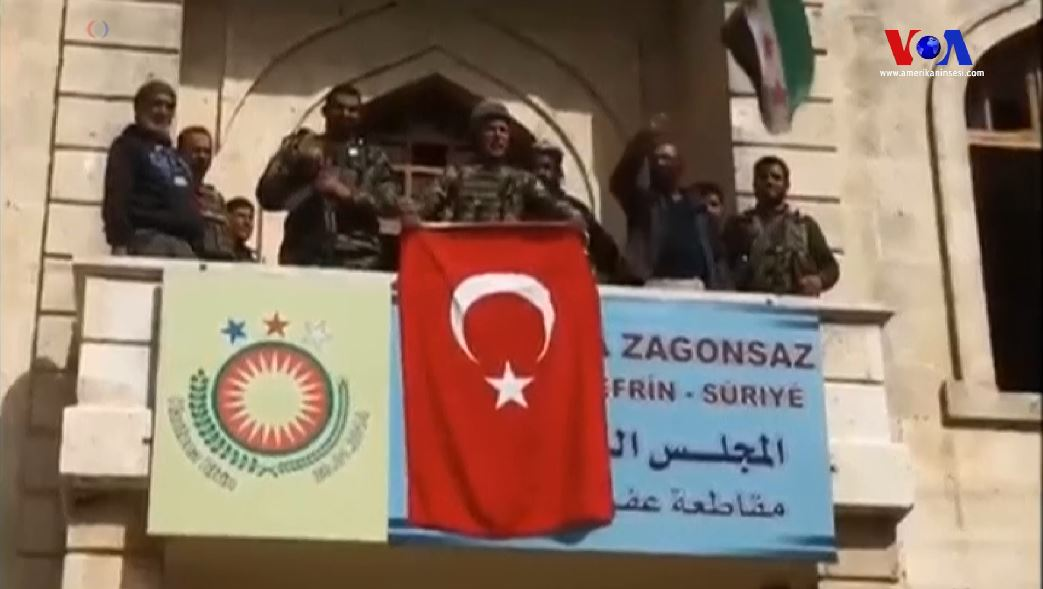
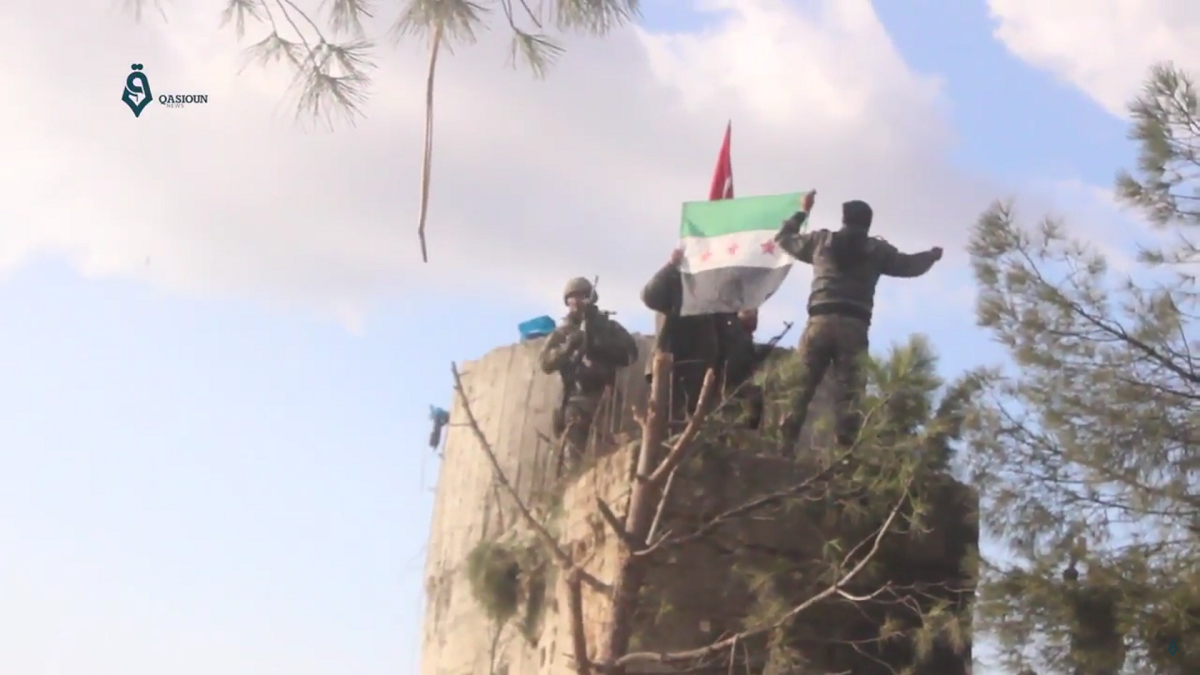
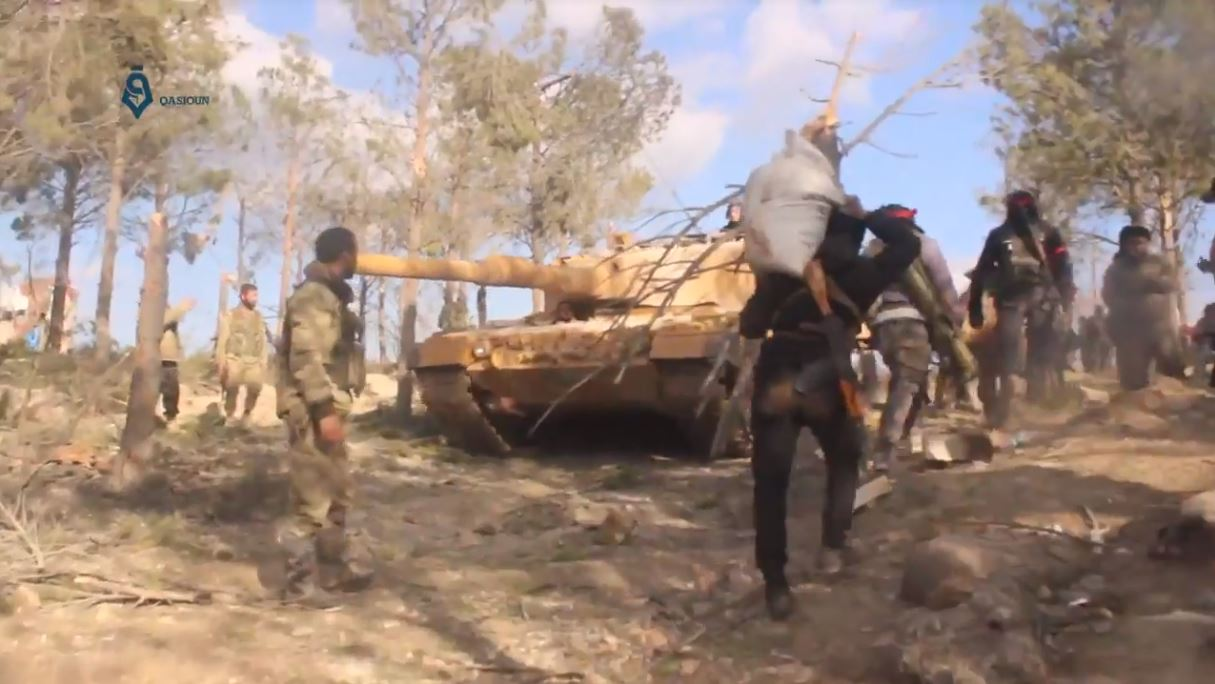
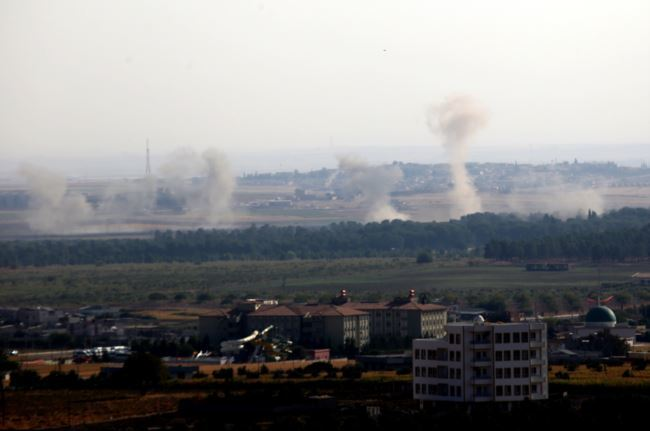
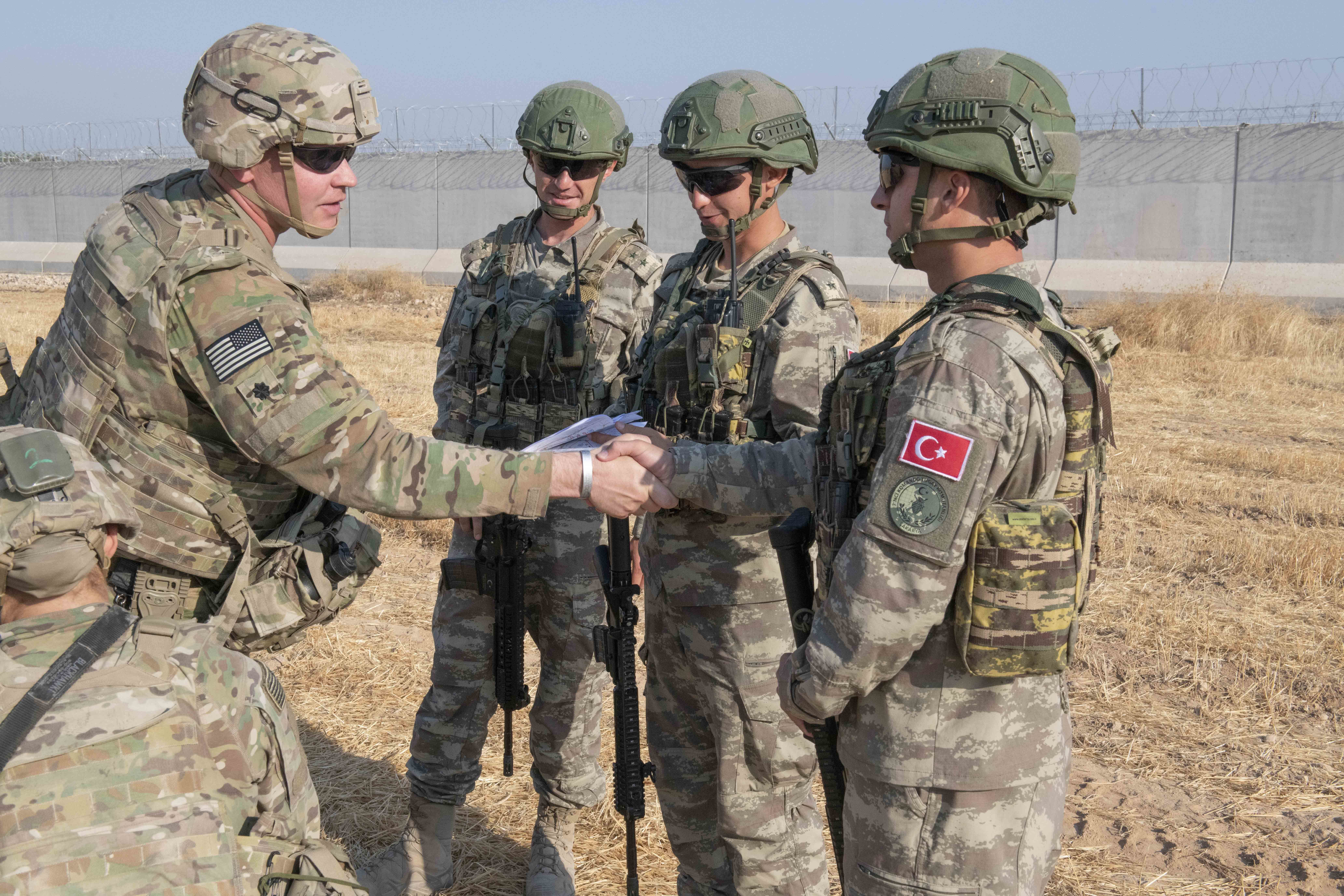
- Clockwise from top left: Al-Bab military council fighters during the Battle of al-Bab; Turkish soldiers and rebel fighters at the building in Afrin that had hosted the PYD-led government of the region; Rebel fighters hoist the Turkish flag and the Syrian independence flag on the top of Mount Barsa; Rebel fighters and a Turkish tank on Mount Barsa; Turkish shelling of Ras al-Ayn during the Battle of Ras al-Ayn; U.S. and Turkish troops rendezvous for a joint patrol in the Northern Syria Buffer Zone
Date	4 October 2012 – 20 January 2026 (14 years, 1 month, 1 week and 5 days)
Location	Syria
Result	Turkish-Syrian opposition victory: Fall of the Assad regime; Dissolution of the SDF following 2026 northeastern Syria offensive
Territorial changes	Turkish Armed Forces and the Syrian National Army captured a total area of 8,835 square kilometres (3,411 sq mi) including over 1000 settlements

Belligerents
Turkey; Syria; Syrian opposition (2011–2024); Syrian Salvation Government; (Syrian opposition) Syrian Interim Government	DAANES: Syrian Democratic Forces; Kurdistan Workers' Party	Islamic State	Ba'athist Syria (surrendered); Russia; Iran; (Libya) Libyan National Army; Hezbollah

Commanders and leaders
(Turkey) Recep Tayyip Erdoğan; (Turkey) Hulusi Akar (2015–2023); (Turkey) Yaşar Güler; (Turkey) Metin Gürak; (Turkey) Hakan Fidan; (Turkey) İbrahim Kalın; (Turkey) İsmail Metin Temel (2016–2018); (Turkey) Zekai Aksakallı (2016–2017); (Syrian opposition) Ahmed al-Sharaa; (Syrian opposition) Murhaf Abu Qasra	(Democratic Autonomous Administration of North and East Syria) Hediya Yousef; (Democratic Autonomous Administration of North and East Syria) Mansur Selum; Adnan Abu Amjad; Talal Silo (defected to Turkey in 2017); Abdulsettar Al-Cadiri	(Islamic State) Abu Bakr al-Baghdadi †; (Islamic State) Abu Ali al-Anbari †; (Islamic State) Yunus Durmaz †; (Islamic State) Abu Ansari †; (Islamic State) Abu Hussein al-Tunusi †; (Islamic State) Abu Khalid Urduni †; (Islamic State) Abu Ja'fr Dagestani †	(Ba'athist Syria) Bashar al-Assad (surrendered); (Ba'athist Syria) Maher al-Assad (surrendered); (Ba'athist Syria) Ali Abdullah Ayyoub (surrendered)

Units involved
(Syrian opposition) Free Syrian Army; (Syrian opposition) SNA (since 2016); Syrian Turkmen Brigades; Hay'at Tahrir al-Sham (2024–2025)	YPG; YPG International; YPJ; Army of Revolutionaries; SDF military councils; MLKP; TKP/ML; United Freedom Forces	Islamic State military	Syrian Arab Armed Forces (surrendered); National Defense Forces (surrendered); Hezbollah military; Islamic Revolutionary Guard Corps; Russian Armed Forces

Strength
685,862 servicemen 668 aircraft	65,000	31,500–100,000 militants (2016)	178,000 servicemen 320 aircraft

Casualties and losses
(Turkey) 299–361 servicemen killed; Equipment: 15 Tanks (Note: 10 Leopard 2 and 5 M60 Patton); 2 IFV's (Note: ACV-15); 2 Helicopters (Note: 1 UH-60 Black Hawk and 1 T129 ATAK); 1 Aircraft (Note: F-4 Phantom); 9 UAVs (Note: 2 TAI Anka-S, 4 Bayraktar TB2, 1 Bayraktar UAS, 2 unknown drones) Destroyed; (Syrian opposition) SNA: 3,109 killed (Note: 2024: 210 killed (Note: 109 in ES, 37 in OB, 65 in PS); 2023: 249 killed (Note: 133 in ES, 37 in OB, 79 in PS); 2022: 230 killed; 2021: 168 killed; 2020: 61 killed; Operation Peace Spring: 355 killed; Operation Olive Branch: 613 killed; Operation Euphrates Shield: 614 killed); 2 killed; (Syrian opposition) Lions of the East Army: 2 killed; SNA anti-Turkey factions: 5 killed	2,365+ killed (Note: 2024: 75 killed; 2023: 109 killed; 2022: 120 killed; 2021: 28 killed (Note: 12 killed in drone strikes, 7 killed, 1 killed, 2 killed, 6 killed.); 2020: 4 killed (Note: 2 killed, 2 killed); Operation Peace Spring: 445 killed; Operation Olive Branch: 1,586 killed; Operation Euphrates Shield: 128 killed (Note: 4 killed (28 August), 3 killed (7 September), 22 killed (20–23 October), 6 killed (25 October), 9 killed (27 October), 3 killed (8 November), 1 killed (10 November), 1 killed (11 November), 6 killed (12–19 November), 1 killed (20 November), 8 killed (21 November), 2 killed (22 November), 6 killed (23 November), 7 killed (27 November), 4 killed (29 November), 2 killed (1 December), 3 killed (2 December), 1 killed (7 December), 2 killed (9 December), 2 killed (14 December), 1 killed (10 February), 2 killed (11 February), 1 killed (16 February), 1 killed (19 February), 3 killed (21 February), 4 killed (1 March), 5 killed (3 March), 5 killed (9 March), 3 killed (11 March), 2 killed (14 March), 1 killed (16 March), 1 killed (18 March), 2 killed (23 March): 24 April 2017: 20+ fighters))	(Islamic State) 3,000+ killed or captured (per Turkey) (Note: 11–15 May 2016: 55 killed; April 2016: 37 killed)	(Ba'athist Syria) 3,000+ killed, wounded, or captured (per Turkey); 452–659 killed (Note: 2024: 21 killed; 2023: 18 killed; 2022: 44 killed; 2021: 5 killed (Note: 1, 1, 1, 1, 1); 2020: 5 killed (Note: 2, 1, 1, 1); Operation Spring Shield: 197 killed or 405 killed; Operation Peace Spring: 29 killed; Operation Olive Branch: 91 killed; Operation Euphrates Shield: 30 killed; 2012: 12 killed); Equipment: 45-135 Tanks; 33-86 Artillery; 33 Vehicles; 20-77 IFVs; 5 AA guns and AM systems; 4 Aircraft (Note: 2 SU-24, 1 MiG-23 and 1 L-39); 3-8 Helicopters (Note: 3 Mi-17) Destroyed or captured; (Hezbollah) 9–14 killed; (Iran) 5–21 killed; (Russia) 3 servicemen killed; Equipment: 1 Aircraft (Note: SU-24); 1 Helicopter (Note: 1 CSAR helicopter) Destroyed or captured
- 881–1,517 civilians killed by Turkish Armed Forces and border guards (Note: 881-1,355 civilians killed per Airwars and 1,517 civilians killed per SOHR)

Turkish involvement in the Syrian civil war began diplomatically and later escalated militarily. After a decade of relatively friendly relations with Syria from 2000 to 2010, Turkey condemned Syrian President Bashar al-Assad over the violent crackdown on protests in 2011 and, from the beginning of the war, Turkey trained defectors of the Syrian Army in its territory under the supervision of the Turkish National Intelligence Organization (MİT), among whom emerged the Free Syrian Army (FSA) in July 2011. The Turkish government's involvement further evolved into border clashes in 2012, and direct military interventions in 2016–20 and 2022, resulting in the Turkish occupation of northern Syria since August 2016. In December 2024, Turkish proxy forces were involved in the 2024 Syrian rebel offensive which toppled the Assad regime in Damascus, becoming one of the most influential parties during the conflict.

Until 2016, Turkey had addressed the Syrian civil war through international diplomacy and targeted sanctions. Tensions between Syria and Turkey significantly worsened after Syrian forces shot down a Turkish fighter jet in June 2012, and border clashes erupted in October 2012. On 24 August 2016, the Turkish Armed Forces began a direct military intervention into Syria by declaring Operation Euphrates Shield, mainly targeting the Islamic State of Iraq and the Levant (ISIL). It had also fulfilled other pre-existing Turkish policy goals, such as limiting the influx of the refugees of the Syrian civil war.

Turkey strongly supported Syrian dissidents, as it became increasingly hostile to the Assad government's policies and encouraged reconciliation among dissident factions. Turkey financed the National Coalition of Syrian Revolutionary and Opposition Forces, also known as the Syrian National Coalition, and facilitated the establishment of the Syrian National Army.

== Background ==
Turkey and Syria have a history of tense relationships. According to Turkish officials, between 1957 and 1998, Turkish forces laid 615,419 antipersonnel mines along the Syrian border "to prevent illegal border crossings." Under the Mine Ban Treaty, Turkey is required to destroy the mines, but has missed deadlines. A Human Rights Watch (HRW) report stated that as of 18 November 2014, over 2,000 civilians were still in the Tall Shair corridor section of the mine belt since Turkey had been refusing entry for cars or livestock, and the refugees did not want to leave behind their belongings.

In 1957, Turkey threatened Syria with war if it allowed Russian military to build bases there, which led to the Syrian Crisis of 1957. Later, in the 1980s and 1990s, the two governments could not agree on sharing the Euphrates and Tigris rivers, with Syria and Iraq criticizing Turkish dam projects on these rivers in Anatolia. In addition, the Syrian government used to support the Kurdistan Workers' Party (PKK) and its affiliated groups, preferring to use the Kurdish issue as a trump card in its relations with Turkey, particularly in the 1990s and in 2011, when it withdrew from parts of Northern Syria and gave them to the PKK-affiliated People's Protection Units (YPG) rather than letting it fall into the hands of Syrian opposition.

Turkey and Syria had a rather strong bond in the 2000s, due to lax migration laws between the two countries. Since the Justice and Development Party was chosen as the ruling party in Turkey in 2002, it took a new direction in its policy in Middle Eastern relations, leading to bilateral relations between Syria and Turkey improving. The normalization of relations started in late 2004, when Erdoğan, then Prime Minister of Turkey, flew to Damascus to sign a free trade agreement. This more liberal approach towards neighboring countries included open border policies with Syria, and more dialogue on cultural and civil-society levels.

Although the Syrian civil war began in 2011, the Turkish government refrained from an immediate condemnation of the Syrian government's actions, initially pursuing a policy of reform advocacy before ultimately denouncing the regime. On 29 March 2011, Prime Minister Erdoğan stated that Assad did not provide a "negative" response when he advised him to listen to the Syrians demonstrating to demand democracy in short order, adding that the Syrian President told him that they are working to lift the state of emergency and to allow the formation of political parties. Furthermore, Syrian opposition activists convened in Istanbul in May 2011 to discuss regime change, and Turkey hosted the head of the Free Syrian Army, Colonel Riad al-Asaad.

On 22 June 2012, a Turkish McDonnell Douglas RF-4E Phantom II reconnaissance jet was intercepted and shot down by the Syrian Army in international airspace, greatly escalating tensions between the two countries. In October 2012, numerous clashes took place along the Syrian–Turkish border, straining bilateral relations and resulting in dozens of civilians and military personnel killed. Syria has repeatedly urged the UN Security Council to "put an end to the crimes of the Turkish regime."

== Refugees ==
Since the beginning of the Syrian civil war, Turkey has accepted over 3.5 million Syrian refugees, most of whom were accommodated in tent cities administered by the country's emergency management agency. Satellite images confirmed that the first Syrian camps appeared in Turkey in July 2011, shortly after the towns of Deraa, Homs and Hama were besieged. In March 2015, the population of Syrian refugees in Turkey was 30 percent in 22 government-run camps near the Syrian-Turkish border.

Turkish President Recep Tayyip Erdoğan stated that Turkey was ready to resettle the Syrian refugees in the northern area that Turkey had invaded in October 2019, and that Turkey would pay for it if necessary. On 9 December 2019, various local accounts indicated that Turkey was moving Syrian refugees into its zone of operations in Northern Syria for the first time; one million people were planned to relocate to the cities of Tell Abyad and Ras al-Ayn, leading to fears of population change.

=== Mistreatment of refugees ===
Since mid-January 2016, Turkey has forcibly returned thousands of Syrian refugees to war zone, and the Syrian Observatory for Human Rights (SOHR) and National Coalition of Syrian Revolution and Opposition Forces reported that Turkish security forces have shot and killed Syrian refugees and asylum seekers, some of whom attempted to cross the border into Turkey. On 10 May 2016, a video by HRW showed Turkish border guards shooting and beating Syrian refugees trying to reach Turkey, resulting in deaths and serious injuries, but Erdoğan and a Turkish official denied the authenticity of the video. On 18 May 2016, lawmakers from the European Parliament Subcommittee on Human Rights said that Turkey should not use Syrian refugees as a bribe for the process of visa liberalization for Turkish citizens inside the European Union.

== Anti-government forces in Syria ==
At the beginning of the Syrian Civil War, Turkey trained defectors of the Syrian Army, a number of whom announced the birth of the Free Syrian Army (FSA), under the supervision of the National Intelligence Organization (MİT), in July 2011. In October 2011, Turkey began sheltering the FSA, offering the group a safe zone and a base of operations. Together with Saudi Arabia and Qatar, Turkey has also provided the rebels with arms and other military equipment. Turkey's geo-political maneuvering, according to scholars such as Ataman and Ozdemir, is in line with its larger ambition to limit Iranian influence on the region.

=== Army of Conquest ===
Turkey, Qatar, and Saudi Arabia have supported the Army of Conquest. The coalition included al-Nusra Front and Ahrar al-Sham, which were linked to al-Qaeda, as well as other Islamist factions such as the Sham Legion, which received covert arms support from the United States. According to The Independent, some Turkish officials said they were giving logistical and intelligence support to the command center of the coalition, but said they did not give direct help to al-Nusra Front, while acknowledging that the group would be beneficiaries. It was also reported by some rebels and officials that Saudis had given monetary support and weapons to Islamist groups, with Turkey facilitating their passage. Al-Ahram reported that U.S. President Obama chose not to confront Saudi Arabia and Qatar over the issue at a May 2015 meeting of the Gulf Cooperation Council, although al-Nusra Front and Ahrar al-Sham troops made up 90% of the troops in Idlib, where they were making substantial gains against the Assad government.

In 2013, Turkey had reportedly criticized the timing of the designation of al-Nusra Front as a terrorist organization, but in June 2014, Turkey began classifying al-Nusra Front as a terrorist group, a decision that was seen as them giving up on the group. In June 2014, İhsan Özkes, a parliamentarian from the Republican People's Party, stated that a directive had been signed by Turkish Interior Minister Muammer Güler, ordering the provision of support to al-Nusra against the Democratic Union Party (PYD), but Güler said that a directive with the letterhead of the Governor's Office of Hatay could not be signed by a minister, directly proving the document's inauthenticity.

On 9 January 2017, Turkey summoned the Russian and Iranian ambassadors to express its disturbance over airstrikes of the Syrian Army in the Idlib Governorate. On 5 May 2017, Mehmet Görmez, the Turkish president of religious affairs, met with Harith al-Dhari, an Iraqi Sunni cleric who was designated by the Al-Qaida Sanctions Committee as someone affiliated with al-Qaeda in Iraq in 2010.

=== Turkistan Islamic Party ===
According to Arab media, the rural town of Zanbaqi near Jisr ash-Shughur, Syria, has developed into a base for an estimated 3,500 Uyghur Turkistan Islamic Party members and their families. They further stated the MİT was being involved in transporting these Uyghurs via Turkey to Syria, with the aim of using them first in Syria to help al-Nusra Front and gain combat experience fighting against the Syrian Army before sending them back to Xinjiang to fight against China if they survived. Arab news organizations also reported that Turkish intelligence organized the Chechens in Junud al-Sham, al-Nusra Front, and Ahrar al-Sham, as well as the Uyghurs in the Turkistan Islamic Party, to collaborate with the Army of Conquest. Turkish media agencies, on the other hand, denied this and stated that it was a scheme by the Chinese government to promise a holy cause and new lands to Uyghur forces with Islamic tendencies, which would eventually be cited by the government as the reason for more oppressive policies towards the Uyghur people. The validity of the Chinese statements had also been challenged by Sean Roberts of Georgetown University in an article on global terrorism. Conversely, other reports emphasized the Uyghur fighters' ties with ISIL, which led to the 2017 Istanbul nightclub shooting against Turkey.

=== 2020 Idlib clashes ===
On 3 February 2020, Syrian and Turkish forces exchanged fire in Idlib, Latakia and the northern Aleppo countryside during the 5th northwestern Syria offensive. Turkey and the SOHR reported that seven Turkish soldiers, one civilian contractor, and 13 Syrian soldiers were killed. Turkey's president Erdoğan demanded that Russian forces in Idlib "stand aside"; he nevertheless dismissed the possibility of direct conflict with Russia, saying that Turkey and Russia would talk about the issue instead. On 10 February, Syrian government forces shelled a then-recently built Turkish observation post at Taftanaz Military Airbase, killing six Turkish soldiers and four Syrian rebels, according to the SOHR. On 11 February, Turkish Armed Forces shot down a Syrian Government helicopter, Mil Mi-17, near Nayrab, killing all its crew. On 27 February 33 Turkish soldiers were killed in the Balyun airstrikes carried out by the Syrian Air Force. In response, Turkey and proxy forces started to target the regime forces and their allies until they recaptured Saraqib, and cut the Damascus-Aleppo M5 highway once again. The deadline to withdraw to the initial de-escalation lines behind the Turkish observation points, previously set by Erdoğan to halt the Syrian regime assault in Idlib Governorate, ended by the end of February.

On 1 March, Turkey initiated a military operation code-named Operation Spring Shield (Turkish: Bahar Kalkanı Harekâtı) against the Assad regime, which aimed to protect local Syrians and to install a lasting ceasefire, according to Turkish Defense Minister Hulusi Akar. From 27 February to 5 March, Turkey claimed the Turkish military neutralized 3,138 Syrian Army soldiers and militia, and destroyed the following material: 3 fighter jets, 8 helicopters, 3 UAVs, 151 tanks, 47 howitzers, 52 launchers, 12 antitank weapons, 4 mortars, 10 arsenal depots and 145 military, technical and combat vehicles. The Turkish Armed Forces also released 12 minutes of drone footage that wrought havoc. According to the SOHR, Turkish troops killed 165 Syrian soldiers and fighters loyal to the regime. On 5 March, Turkey and Russia announced that a ceasefire in Idlib would come into force at midnight, a decision taken in light of the rising number of human rights violations since the offensive began in the region. Despite the two countries reaching an agreement, Turkey said that it still held "the right to retaliate with all its strength" against future attacks carried out by the forces of the Syrian government.

== Turkish–Kurdish conflict ==
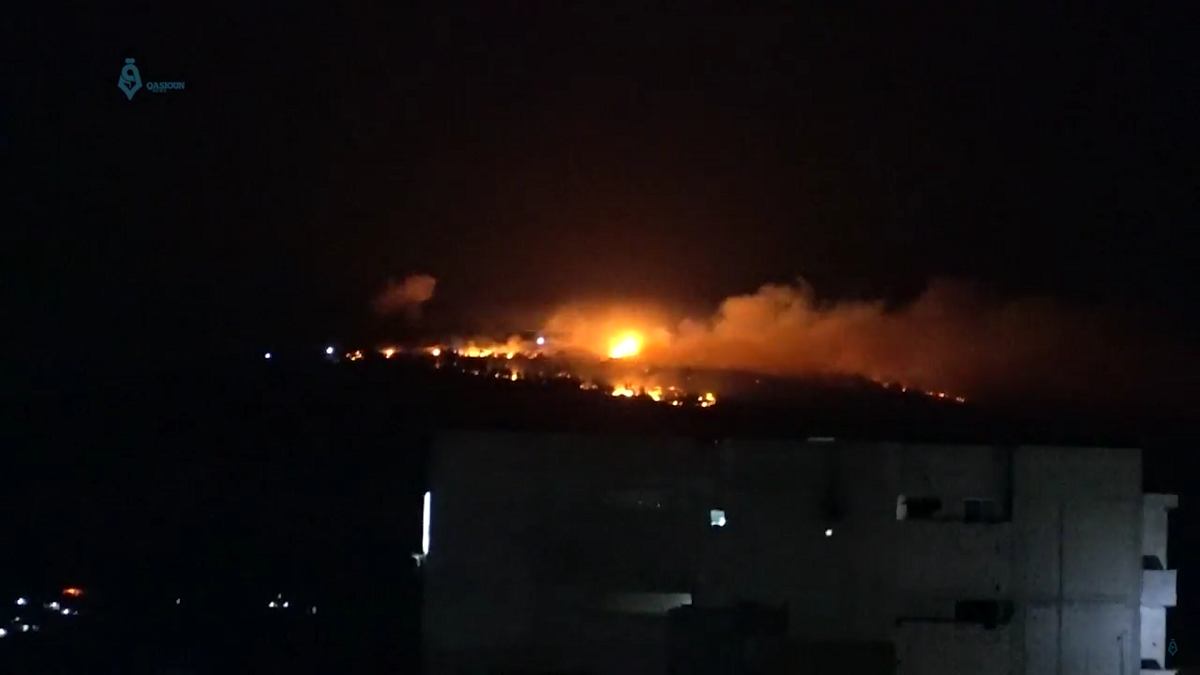
Turkish Army artillery bombard an SDF position in the northern Aleppo countryside in July 2017

The Turkish government promotes the narrative that the Syrian Kurdish Democratic Union Party (PYD), the leading political party of the Autonomous Administration of North and East Syria, and the YPG militia, the leading component group of the Syrian Democratic Forces (SDF), were reportedly taking control of and ethnically cleansing land which did not belong to the Kurds. No evidence has been provided for these assertions, which were refuted by the United Nations. Turkish president Erdoğan has stated that Arabs would be more able to live in the area, which he believed was mostly desert, although Syrian Kurdistan is mostly north of the Syrian Desert. Political analysts stated that throughout the Syrian civil war, while Turkey presented itself as the protector of Syrian Turkmens, its real goal was to fight Kurdish forces, as Turkey ignored several atrocities committed by the Syrian government against Turkmens during the war.

Turkey has received the co-chair of the PYD, Salih Muslim, for talks in 2013 and in 2014, and entertained the idea of opening a Rojava representation office in Ankara if it abides by the city's policies. Opposition leader Selahattin Demirtas has suggested for Turkey and other countries to recognize Rojava and work with it as a partner, but Turkey remained persistently hostile because it feels threatened by Rojava's emergence encouraging activism for autonomy among Kurds in Turkey and the Kurdish–Turkish conflict, and in this context in particular Rojava's leading PYD and the YPG militia being members of the Kurdistan Communities Union, which also includes both political and militant Kurdish organizations in Turkey itself, including the PKK. Turkey's policy towards Rojava is based on an economic blockade, persistent attempts of international isolation, opposition to the cooperation of the international Anti-ISIL-coalition with Rojava militias, and support of Islamist Syrian Civil War parties hostile towards Rojava, in past times including ISIL. On several occasions, Turkey has also attacked Rojava territory and defense forces, with the latter resulting in some of the most clearcut instances of international solidarity with Rojava.

=== Intervention plans ===
A vote in the Turkish Parliament was scheduled for 1 October 2014 on whether or not to invade Syria as part of the war on ISIL while preparations for a possible intervention were made. The de facto "declaration of war" took the form of two separate motions, one on Iraq and one on Syria, which would authorize Turkish troops to invade those countries. Deputy Prime Minister Bülent Arınç said that the resolutions aimed to extend the current mandate for "hot pursuit" against the PKK and Syrian Army into Syria and Iraq, which was to end the second week in October, to add the Islamic State to the list, and to set up a buffer zone on the Syrian side of the border. President Erdoğan opened the parliamentary session by saying that Turkey would fight against the Islamic State and other "terrorist" groups in the region, but would stick to its aim of seeing Bashar al-Assad removed from power. The motion passed 298–98.

With the governing party losing its majority in the Turkish general election on 7 June 2015, rumors began to circulate that President Erdoğan would order an intervention of Syria to prevent the creation of a Kurdish state straddling northern Syria and Iraq. Leaked plans stated that, sometime during the first couple of weeks of July, up to 18,000 troops invaded Syria via the Jarabulus and Azaz borders, which were in the hands of ISIL and the Free Syrian Army, respectively, and set up a buffer zone to which refugees could be repatriated. Limiting intervention to airstrikes has also been discussed, since the idea of invading Syria proved extremely unpopular with most sections of Turkish society.

By the end of June, a number of Turkish newspapers reported that Ankara was considering a ground operation to establish a buffer zone, which was planned to be 110 km long and 33 km deep, along the Turkish border in Northern Syria to prevent Syrian Kurds from declaring an independent state. The military demanded legal backing for such a move, which Erdoğan provided on 29 June by chairing a meeting of the National Security Council.

=== Kobani activity ===
With the Turkish government believing that a declaration was enough, and with only a select few western airstrikes aiding Kobani defenders, troops from the Islamic State of Iraq and the Levant (ISIL) edged closer to the city, eventually entering it from the southwest in October 2014. Feeling betrayed by the Turkish government and hearing that Prime Minister Ahmet Davutoğlu's previous vow not to let Kobani fall was actually a lie, refugees and Turkish citizens began to protest. Turkish police responded with tear gas and water cannons, and live ammunition in the southern province of Adana, killing protestors.

By 7 October, ISIL militants and Kurdish defenders were fighting in the streets of Kobani, with many dead and scores wounded on both sides. On 10 October, ISIL began shelling the border post near Kobani. Meanwhile, rioting continued in Turkey, and 31 people were killed in street clashes by mid-October. Turkish President Erdoğan denounced the protests, stating that they were attacking Turkey's "peace, stability, and environment of trust."

On 29 November 2014, ISIL began attacking the YPG in Kobani from Turkish territory. During the attack, a group of ISIL fighters were seen atop granary silos on the Turkish side of the border. According to Der Spiegel, ISIL fighters also attacked YPG positions near the border gate from Turkish soil. According to the SOHR, YPG fighters crossed the Turkish border and attacked ISIL positions on Turkish soil, before pulling back to Syria. The Turkish Army later regained control of the border crossing and the silos.

On 25 June 2015, ISIL fighters launched an attack against Kobani, detonating three car bombs. The ISIL fighters reportedly disguised themselves as Kurdish security forces before entering the town and shooting civilians with assault rifles and RPGs. Over 164 people were killed and 200 injured. Kurdish forces and the Syrian government stated the vehicles had entered the city from across the border, an action denied by Turkey. ISIS also executed at least 23 Syrian Kurds, among them women and children, in the village of Barkh Butan, about 20 kilometers south of Kobani.

=== Rojava expansion and increased Turkish hostility ===
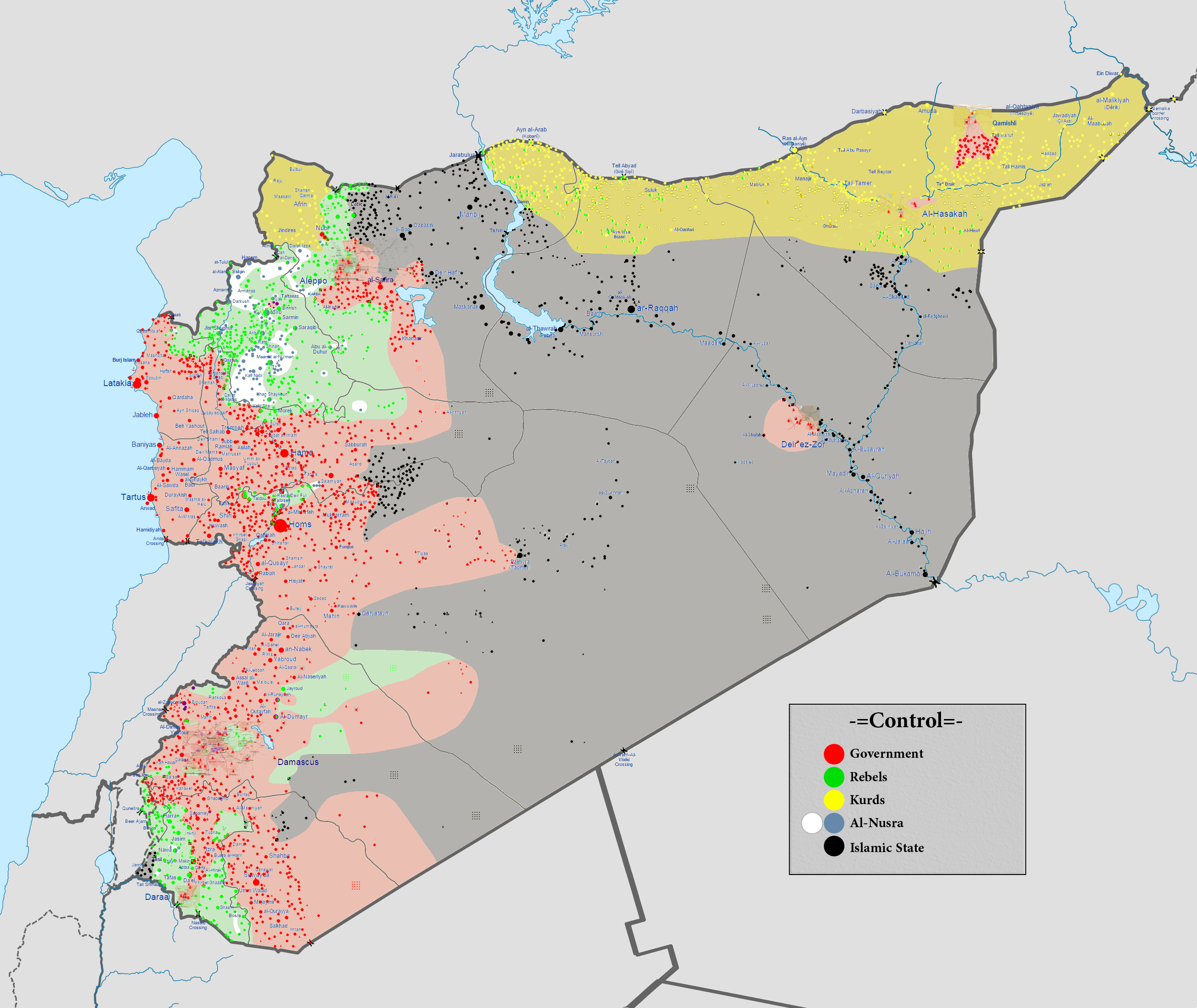
Military situation in December 2015

On 24 and 25 October 2015, Kurds said the Turkish military opened fire at its forces in Tell Abyad after the majority Arab town was included into Kobani Canton. Davutoğlu confirmed it, saying "we hit it twice". There were no casualties in the shooting and the Kurdish forces did not return fire. On 25 October, Turkish forces also attacked the village of Buban, wounding two civilians during the attack.

In addition, SOHR said that Turkish troops were shelling the road to the west of Tal Rifaat and the region to the west of the Syrian border town of Azaz, but failed to stop the advance of the Kurdish forces. On 16 February 2016, Turkish forces continued to shell the positions of Syrian Kurds in northern Syria for the fourth day. Turkish military said that it was retaliating to fire coming from the region. On 17 February 2016, in Ankara, a car bombing attack happened at night. The attack targeted a convoy of military vehicles. Davutoğlu and President Erdoğan blamed a Syrian Kurdish militia fighter working with Kurdish militants inside Turkey for a suicide car bombing, and vowed retaliation in both Syria and Iraq. However the Kurdistan Freedom Falcons took responsibility for the attack and said they targeted security forces.

In February 2016, Turkey and Saudi Arabia were pressing for ground operations in Syria, hoping for the involvement of the U.S. and other allies. The leader of Hezbollah said Turkey and Saudi Arabia were using the Islamic State group as a "pretext" to launch a ground operation in Syria. On 17 February 2016, Erdoğan said that Turkey would continue shelling Kurdish militants across the border in Syria, despite calls from Washington and other Western capitals to halt the attacks. Opposition groups reported that over the previous few days they had brought over 2,000 reinforcements with heavy equipment from the Idlib area, through Turkey assisted by Turkish forces, to fight against Kurdish militias north of Aleppo and to support rebels in Azaz. Pentagon Press Secretary Peter Cook said that Turkey's shelling of YPG forces in northern Syria would be an "ongoing topic of conversation" between the United States and Turkey. On 4 March 2016, the YPG militia said that Turkey's tanks had fired dozens of shells at its positions in the area of Afrin in northwest Syria. On 8 March, mortar shells fired from Syria in Turkey, killing two civilians and prompting the Turkish military to return fire into Syria. According to Davutoğlu, Islamic State militants were responsible for the attack.

In the wake of the major military advances that Syrian government forces and Syrian Democratic Forces made against jihadists during the Northern Aleppo offensive, Ankara called for a safe zone and no-fly zone in northern Aleppo governorate. The proposal did not garner any real support from Washington or NATO allies, who feared it would require an internationally patrolled no-fly zone and potentially put them in direct confrontation with Assad and his allies. German Chancellor Angela Merkel said that such a safe zone would be helpful, but Russia, who held dominance over Syria's skies, opposed the idea; Russian Foreign Minister Sergey Lavrov clarified that "this is not Merkel's initiative, this is a Turkish initiative." In addition, Russian Deputy Foreign Minister Gennady Gatilov said that any decision to create a no-fly zone over Syria cannot be made without the approval of both the government in Damascus and the UN Security Council.

In April 2016, factions of the SDF formed the Manbij Military Council. The U.S. asked for Turkey's support for the Manbij offensive, but Turkey had two demands that were rejected, namely that the forces in the offensive should leave the secular SDF umbrella, and that the U.S. should increase its airstrikes for jihadist groups Turkey supports.

=== 2016–2017 military interventions ===
On 24 August 2016, Turkish Armed Forces and Syrian rebels launched Operation Euphrates Shield against ISIS and SDF.

On 24 August 2016, the Turkish armed forces, backed by planes from a U.S.-led coalition, began their first direct military intervention into Syria, called Operation Euphrates Shield. After two days of artillery bombardment and airstrikes, the Turkish Land Forces launched an attack on the ISIL-held town of Jarabulus, followed by hundreds of FSA fighters. It was the first time Turkish warplanes have struck in Syria since November 2015, when Turkey downed a Russian warplane, and the first significant incursion by Turkish special forces since a brief operation to relocate the tomb of Suleyman Shah in February 2015.

The immediate goal of the military intervention was the capture of Jarabulus, which was accomplished on the first day of the operation, but the intervention escalated into the Turkish occupation of Northern Syria. Turkey said the operation was an act of self-defense, in response to ISIS shelling Turkish border towns and suicide bombings and attacks targeting Turkish nationals. Erdoğan said on the first day of the operation that it was aimed against both the ISIL and the YPG, a major component of the SDF, saying both "terror groups [...] threaten our country in northern Syria". Turkish foreign minister Mevlüt Çavuşoğlu added that the YPG should return east of Syria's Euphrates River, since both Manbij and Jarabulus are west of the river. Syrian Kurdish forces said that the Turkish operation was motivated more by the desire to stop their advance at Jarablus than by anti-ISIS sentiment.

The SDF managed to take the town of Amarinah from the FSA after a brief firefight. In September 2016, U.S. Special Operations Forces embedded with the SDF to successfully deter Turkey and Turkish-backed jihadi rebels from attacking SDF forces south of the Sajur river in Manbij. On 21 September, The New York Times reported that the U.S. administration "is weighing a military plan to directly arm Syrian Kurdish fighters combating the Islamic State, a major policy shift that could speed up the offensive against the terrorist group but also sharply escalate tensions between Turkey and the United States." Reacting to these reports, Erdoğan said on 23 September that "arming another terrorist group for fighting another terrorist group is not acceptable." Following these statements, the Turkish army shelled two YPG positions in the Tell Abyad area. On 25 September 2016, the U.S. spokesman for the Combined Joint Task Force – Operation Inherent Resolve confirmed that the SDF, including the YPG, were part of the "vetted forces" in the train-and-equip program and would be supplied with weapons. Erdoğan condemned this decision.

On 26 September, Turkey's Deputy Prime Minister Numan Kurtulmuş welcomed the withdrawal of some YPG units east of the Euphrates river. On 27 September, Turkey sent military units to the border area of Akçakale, but the same day, Çavuşoğlu said that YPG units had not withdrawn from Manbij and its countryside, stating that the United States's absence suggested that they either could not influence the YPG or they chose not to. On 3 October, the Turkish government once again stated that fighters of YPG were still present west of the Euphrates and called on the U.S. to hold to its promise that they withdraw to the east of the river. The following day, Yıldırım said that Turkey could use force to expel YPG from Manbij. Due to the continuing Turkish threats, on 4 October, the SDF spokesman explicitly ruled out any Turkish participation in the upcoming joint military operation of the SDF and the CJTF–OIR to capture Raqqa from ISIL. Later, an Obama administration official said that their "Plan B" to retake Raqqa by arming the Kurds was adopted after the initial plan of using Turkish forces in the Raqqa offensive became unattainable.

On 18 October 2016, Erdoğan said that the YPG would be removed from Manbij after ISIL was driven from al-Bab. On 25 October, Çavuşoğlu stated that Turkey would dislodge "PYD/PKK" from Manbij if it did not leave the city, a sentiment expressed by Erdoğan the following day. On 11 November, Erdoğan stated the Turkish intervention intended to expand the area under the FSA's control to 5,000 square kilometres (1,900 sq mi), which includes al-Bab, Manbij and Tell Rifaat, allowing Syrian refugees to return to the respective cities with help from the European Union, and he would focus on Raqqa and the PYD afterwards. On 29 November, Erdoğan said that the Turkish military launched its operations in Syria to end the rule of Syrian President Bashar al-Assad. Days later, Erdoğan sought to retract his statement; media observers attributed his outburst to frustration due to failure of his government's Syria policies.

Acting U.S. Assistant Secretary of Defense for International Security Affairs, Elissa Slotkin, said on 16 January 2017 that the only target for the US-led coalition is ISIL, and not the city of Manbij that had been cleared from ISIL by the SDF. On 20 January 2017, the Deputy Prime Minister of Turkey, Mehmet Şimşek, said that "we can't say that Assad must go anymore. A deal without Assad isn't realistic." On 27 January 2017, after the multilateral peace talks in Astana, Erdoğan said that "we should not go deeper than al-Bab" and Çavuşoğlu said "there are different opinions about YPG and Hezbollah. So an agreement can not be reached about the struggle against them". On 31 January, the Germany Defense Ministry ruled out giving Turkey full access to high-resolution aerial imagery gathered by Tornado fighter jets operating out of Incirlik Air Base in southern Turkey as part of the anti-ISIL coalition, out of concern that Turkey might use it for military action against the SDF.

==== Potential intervention into Iraq ====
On 1 November 2016, the day Iraqi forces entered Mosul in the battle against ISIL, Turkey announced it was sending tanks and artillery from Ankara to Silopi near the Iraqi border. Turkey's Minister of Defense, Fikri Işık, said the deployment was a move to prepare for "important developments" in the region and stated that "further action can be taken if Turkey's red lines are crossed". Iraqi Prime Minister Al-Abadi, while addressing journalists in Baghdad, warned Turkey not to invade Iraq, predicting war if they did. On 5 April 2017, Erdoğan suggested that future stages of Operation Euphrates Shield, which was recently proclaimed concluded, would be broader, and that Turkey would also seek to occupy territory of Iraq.

=== 2018 military interventions ===
On 20 January 2018, Turkey launched Operation Olive Branch against SDF in Afrin Region.

In January 2018, the Turkish military began an intervention in the Afrin region of Syria, code-named by Turkey as Operation Olive Branch (Turkish: Zeytin Dalı Harekâtı). The Turkish Armed Forces announced the start of the Operation on 20 January, while the Turkish Defense Minister said it started with cross-border shelling the day before. This followed Erdoğan's parliamentary address to his ruling the Justice and Development Party on 9 January, in which he said that Turkey will continue its military operation in Syria's Afrin and Manbij regions.

On 28 October 2018, following a summit with the heads of state of France, Germany, Russia and Turkey, Turkey started shelling targets in northern Syria. On 12 December, Erdoğan said during a televised speech that Turkey would launch a military operation against the Kurds east of the Euphrates river in northern Syria within days. He added that since the US-backed Kurdish fighters in Syria had not left the town of Manbij and, as agreed in a US-Turkish deal, that Turkey would remove them. The United States responded that such actions would be unacceptable and that "coordination and consultation between the U.S. and Turkey is the only approach to address issues of security concern in this area." Erdoğan also said that Turkey's "anti-terror" operations in northern Iraq would continue.

=== 2019 military intervention ===
Map of the 2019 Turkish offensive into north-eastern Syria.

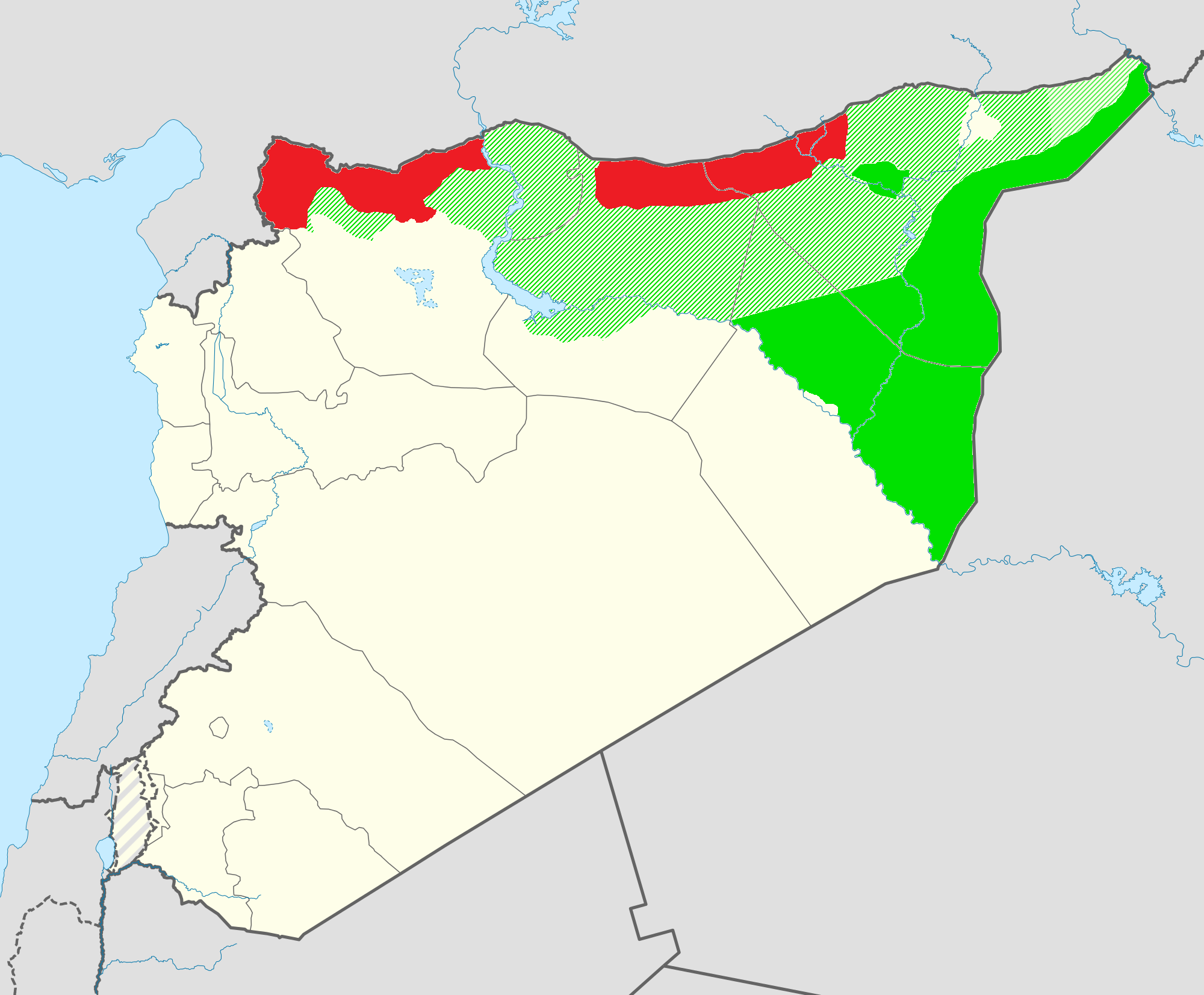
SDF-controlled territory (green) and Turkish-controlled territory (red) in October 2019

Following the January 2019 Manbij bombing, Erdoğan told Trump that Turkey was ready to take over security in the town. In October, another Turkish offensive into north-eastern Syria began, after US President Trump ordered the withdrawal of US forces. According to Erdoğan, the operation was intended to expel the SDF from the border region as well as to create a 30 km (19 mi) "safe zone" in Northern Syria where some of the 3.6 million Syrian refugees in Turkey would resettle. This intention was criticized as an attempt at ethnic cleansing, a criticism denied by the Turkish government, who said they intended to "correct" the demographics that they alleged have been changed by the SDF. Turkey began to appoint mayors in several northern Syrian towns in late 2019.

The prospects for Kurdish autonomy in the region severely diminished, because the Kurds were exposed to the Turkish-led offensive by the U.S. withdrawal and the Russia-backed Syrian government forces under Assad—whose commonality is enmity towards Turkey and Sunni rebel militias—regaining their foothold in northeast Syria after the Kurds had to seek their help. In December 2019, various Kurdish factions that were historical rivals began to meet in order to work together more. Their stated reason was to stand together against Russia and Turkey if needed. The Russian government has informed the Kurdish factions that they should reconcile and come up with a unified set of demands to clarify to Russia. Various Kurdish factions blamed each other and their council for lack of progress.

Following European criticism of the 2019 Turkish offensive into north-eastern Syria, Erdoğan threatened to open the borders for migrants to Europe, and to expel foreign jihadists in its custody. In June 2020, the Syria's permanent representative to the UN accused the US and Turkey of deliberately setting fire to agrarian crops at the Jazira Region in Syria. In March 2023, thousands protested at the town of Jindires against the Turkish-backed armed groups controlling the area, after the killing of four Kurdish men who were celebrating Nowruz. Jaish al-Sharqiya, a splinter group of Ahrar al-Sharqiya, were accused for the murders of the Kurdish men.

=== 2022 cross-border airstrikes ===
By August 2022, Airwars estimated that 736–1,189 civilians were killed by Turkish airstrikes in Syria and Iraq since 2015, including 146-170 children, 104-119 women, and 1,400 named victims. The Turkish military has denied that any of its strikes have resulted in civilian casualties. Turkey launched 339 attacks on North and East Syria in early 2024, killing five civilians and injuring 52, according to the Syrian Democratic Forces. The attacks severely damaged infrastructure and essential services, with the SDF and international law experts labeling these actions as war crimes.

On 26 November 2022, SDF commander-in-chief Mazloum Abdi stated that they halted operations against the Islamic State group due to Turkish attacks on northern Syria. He also accused Turkish strikes of causing severe damage to the region's infrastructure. Two rockets also targeted U.S.-led coalition forces at bases in the northeastern Syrian town of Ash Shaddadi. According to SOHR, Turkish forces killed 138 Kurdish and SDF-fighters, 26 Syrian troops and 74 civilians, including 16 children. In addition, 16 Turkish troops were killed in Syria.

== Turkey–ISIL conflict ==
=== ISIL terror attacks in Turkey ===
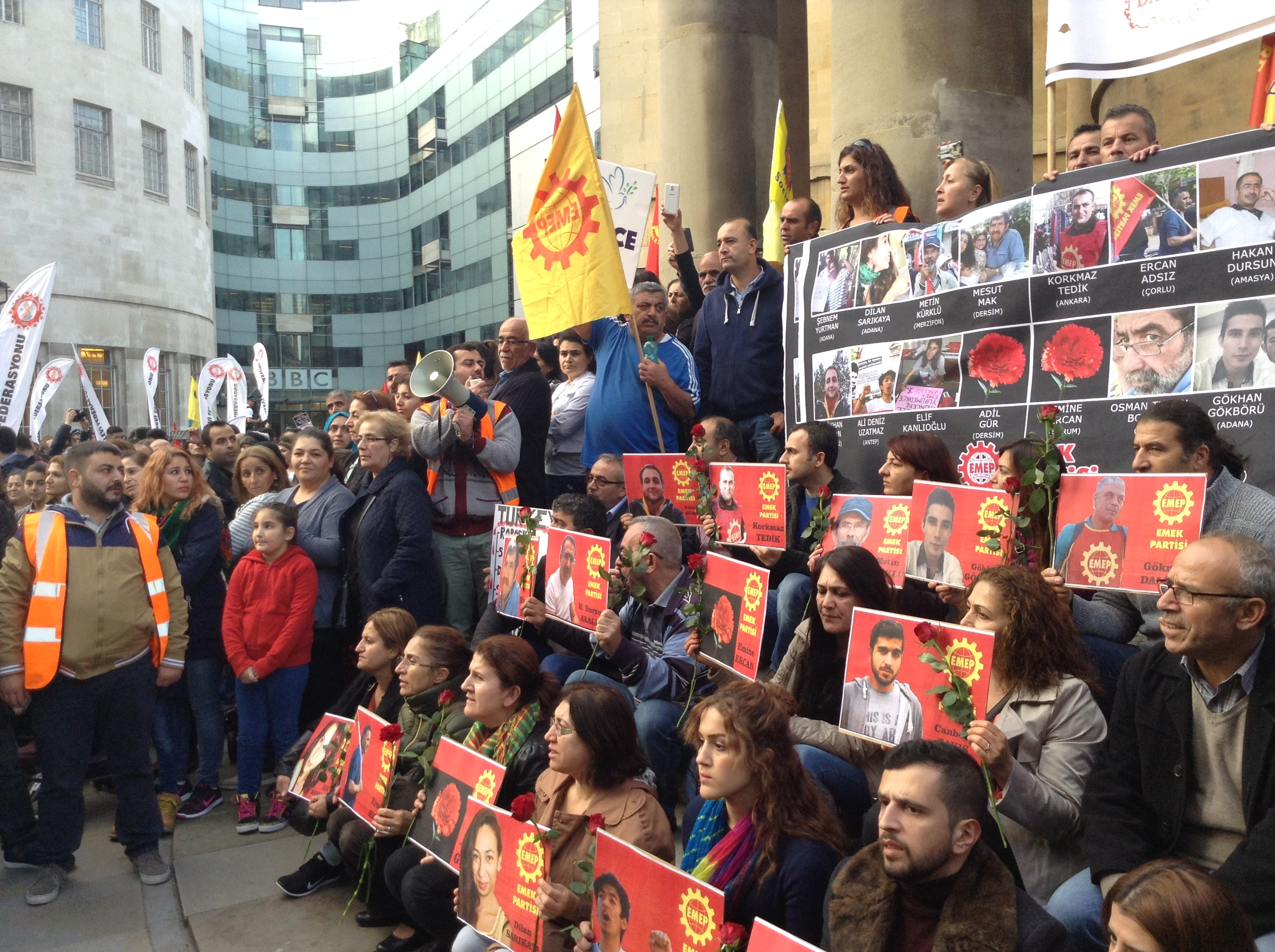
Supporters of the Turkish Labour Party protesting in London following the 2015 Ankara bombings

Between 2015 and 2016, ISIL performed numerous terror attacks in Turkey. On 7 July 2015, reports surfaced that Turkish security forces seized a truck bound for Syria loaded with 10,000 detonators and explosive primers with total length of 290,000 metres (950,000 feet) in Akçakale, Şanlıurfa Province, southeastern Turkey. Five people were arrested; the detainees said they attempted to cross the border from the village of Aegean into Tell Abyad city in Al-Raqqah Province. On 20 July, Suruç's municipal culture center, located in Şanlıurfa Province, was bombed by a Turkish ISIL member, killing 32 people and hospitalizing at least 100 people. On 10 October 2015 at 10:04 local time (EEST) in Ankara, two bombs were detonated outside Ankara Central railway station, injuring 500 people, and, with a death toll of 103 civilians, surpassing the 2013 Reyhanlı car bombings as the deadliest terror attack in modern Turkish history.

ISIL has also employed suicide bombers in terror attacks in Turkey; on 19 March 2016, a suicide bombing took place in Istanbul's Beyoğlu district in front of the district governor's office. The attack occurred at 10:55 local time (EET) at the intersection of Balo Street with İstiklal Avenue, a central shopping street. The attack killed at least five people, including the perpetrator. 36 people were injured, including seven whose injuries were severe. On 22 March, the Turkish interior minister said that the bomber had links with ISIL. On 28 June, ISIL militants attacked Istanbul's Atatürk Airport. The three suicide bombers opened fire at passengers before blowing themselves up. The attacks left 45 dead and 230 wounded.

=== Cross-border confrontations ===
In April 2016, Turkish artillery strikes killed 37 ISIL militants, and 22 people were wounded by ISIL rocket projectiles hitting the border province of Kilis. The Turkish Foreign Ministry has demanded raising awareness on Kilis to the United States Department of State. Turkey also demanded the deployment of M142 HIMARS rocket launchers at the Turkish–Syrian border, under the belief that such moves would push ISIL militants southwards, leaving Kilis out of battery ranges.

From 3 to 6 May 2016, rocket missiles struck Kilis from ISIS-controlled territory, with the Turkish Army responding with fire at every attack. The governor's office in Kilis released an official statement declaring the province a "special security area", which was effective from 5 to 20 May at 5:00 p.m. During the morning hours of 7 May, the Turkish military carried out four separate air strikes against ISIL positions in northern Syria, with the assistance of U.S.-led coalition forces. Two Katyusha rockets were fired on Kilis following the air strikes; in response, Turkish armed forces shelled ISIL targets with howitzers from the border, but ISIL positions were spotted northwest of Tell el-Hammam and in Sawran, Aleppo Governorate.

=== Death of ISIS leader ===
On 30 April 2023, Erdoğan announced that the Turkish National Intelligence Organization had tracked down and killed ISIS leader Abu al-Hussein al-Husseini al-Qurashi the previous day, but the United States could not verify claims by Turkey that its forces killed al-Qurashi. Turkish media reported that the operation occurred at Jindires, in a region controlled by Turkish-backed rebel groups, in which al-Qurashi detonated his suicide vest to avoid being captured. In August 2023, ISIS said al-Qurashi was killed during clashes with Hay'at Tahrir al-Sham (HTS), whom it accused of being Turkish agents. The United States believes the HTS was behind the killing despite the latter's denials.

== International collaboration ==
=== NATO schism ===
In late 2019, there were signs of a schism between Turkey and other NATO members, in which the Turkish government was aware that NATO did not hold much leverage in regards to Turkish interventions. Furthermore, United States President Trump, as well as U.S. military and diplomatic officials, has cited the NATO membership of Turkey as a key reason that the U.S. cannot be involved in the conflict between the Turkish and Syrian Kurdish forces. Meanwhile, due to Turkey's strategic position between Europe and the Middle East, the NATO alliance members have limited themselves to relatively muted criticism.

Numerous issues in resolving the conflict emerged at the 2019 London NATO summit. President Emmanuel Macron of France highlighted major differences with Turkey over the definition of terrorism, and said there was little chance this aspect of the conflict could be resolved positively. Macron criticized Turkey for fighting against groups who had been allied with France and the West in fighting terrorism. Turkey proposed a safe zone where Syrian refugees could be relocated, but this idea did not receive support from all parties. Meanwhile, there were concerns in NATO about Turkey's growing closeness with Russia.

=== United States ===
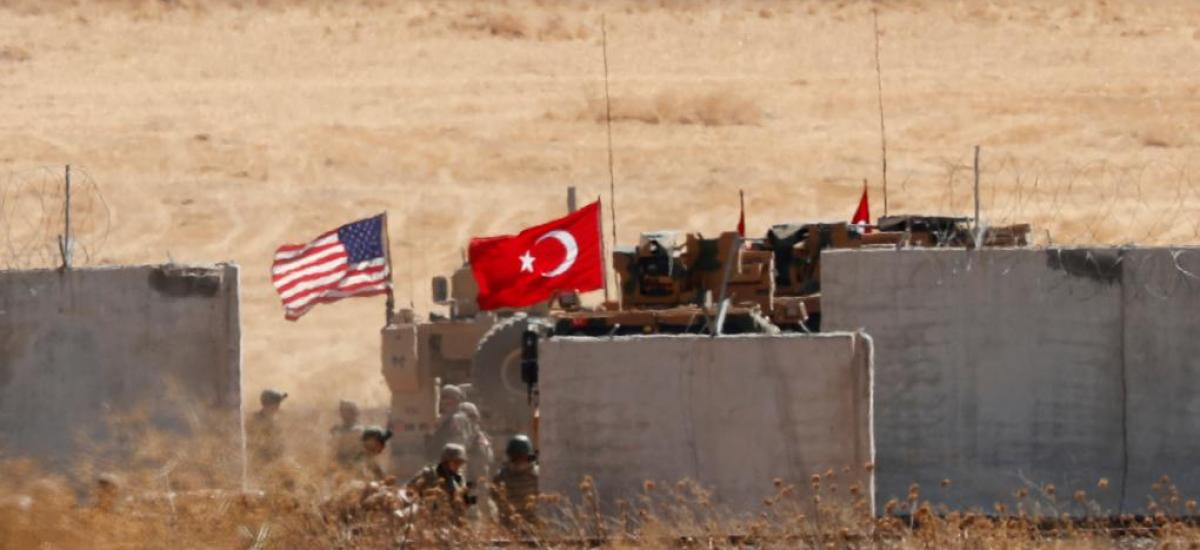
Turkish and U.S. soldiers rendezvous in the Northern Syria Buffer Zone, September 2019

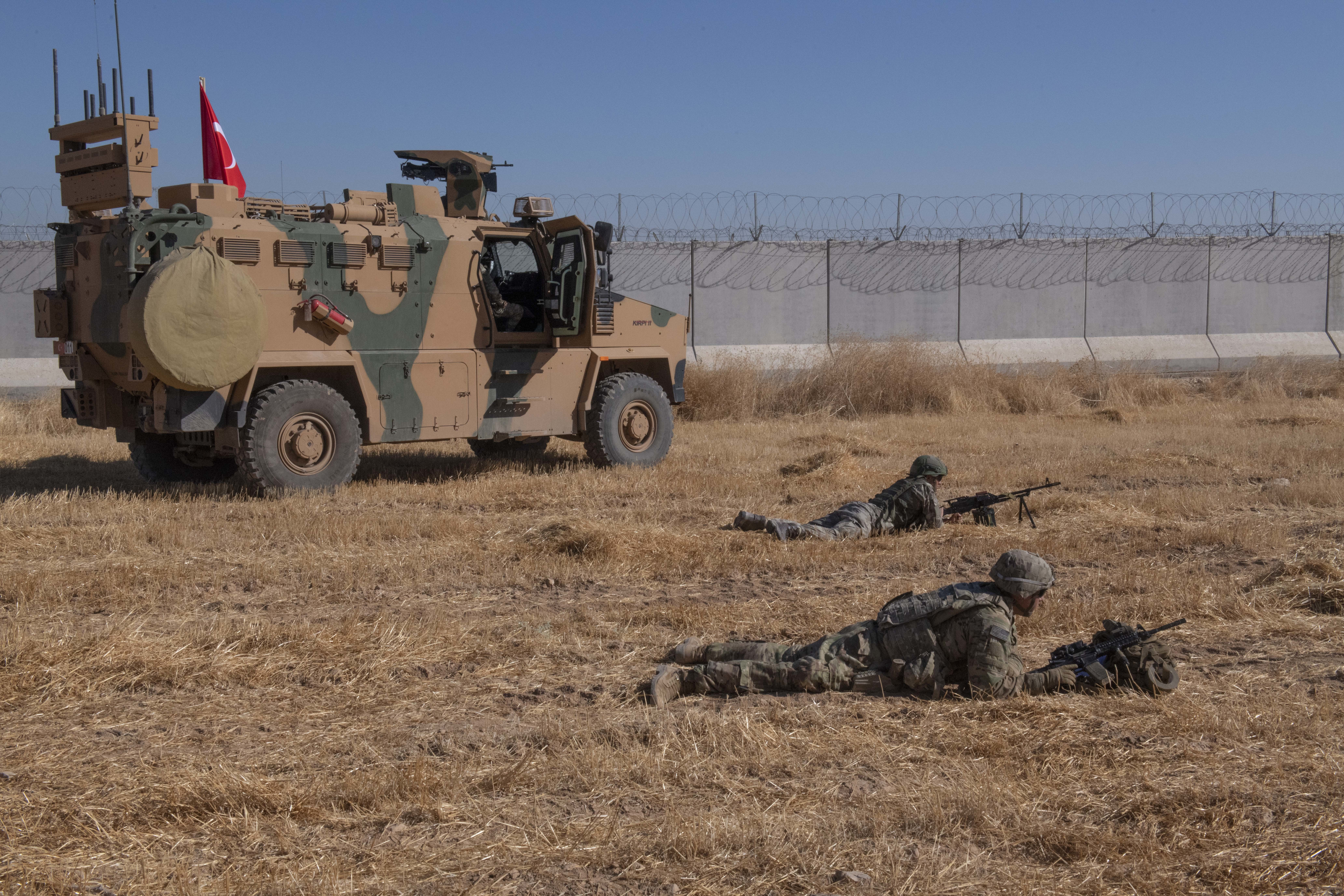
Turkish and U.S. soldiers providing security for a joint ground patrol in the Northern Syria Buffer Zone, 24 September 2019

On 13 October 2014, Turkey denied the United States from using Incirlik Air Base for attacking ISIS militants in Syria, which frustrated the U.S., whose efforts to build an international coalition to tackle ISIS forces from the air were partly hobbled by the difficulty of getting Turkey engaged. After long negotiations with the U.S., on 23 July 2015, Turkey allowed U.S. planes to launch airstrikes against Islamic State militants. U.S. officials declined to give details of the agreement with Turkey. On 25 February 2016, Saudi Arabian warplanes began arriving at the base as part of an anti-ISIS build-up being deployed over Syria, adding to U.S., German and British aircraft already using the base. The families of U.S. troops and civilian personnel stationed at Incirlik Air Base left the base on 2 and 3 April 2016, following an order by the Pentagon and the U.S. State Department to leave several areas of Turkey for their security.

In May 2016, Turkish Foreign Minister Mevlut Cavusoglu was angered by a series of photos which showed U.S. special forces in Syria wearing the insignia of the YPJ during joint operations against the Islamic State (IS). He called the U.S. "two-faced" and said the practice was "unacceptable", but Pentagon press secretary Peter Cook said it is common for American soldiers to attempt to blend in with local partners. According to Çavuşoğlu, Turkey proposed a detailed plan to the U.S. for a joint military operation against jihadists inside Syria with the Americans and other allied troops, but U.S. officials denied it and said that Turkey had only offered a few basic concepts which involved joint efforts that only supported non-Kurdish forces.

After U.S. forces allowed the October 2019 Turkish incursion into northeastern Syria, the Trump administration was criticized for prioritizing Turkey over its Kurdish allies. Abdi expressed his disappointment over the situation, asking "How can we best protect our people? And is the United States still our ally?" Several American lawmakers criticized the apparent abandonment, remarking that it undermined U.S. credibility as an ally while only benefiting Russia, Iran, and Assad's government. The New York Times reported that in response to the October 2019 Turkish intervention, the U.S. was reviewing the potential withdrawal of its nuclear weapons from Incirlik Air Base under NATO's nuclear sharing.

=== Russia ===
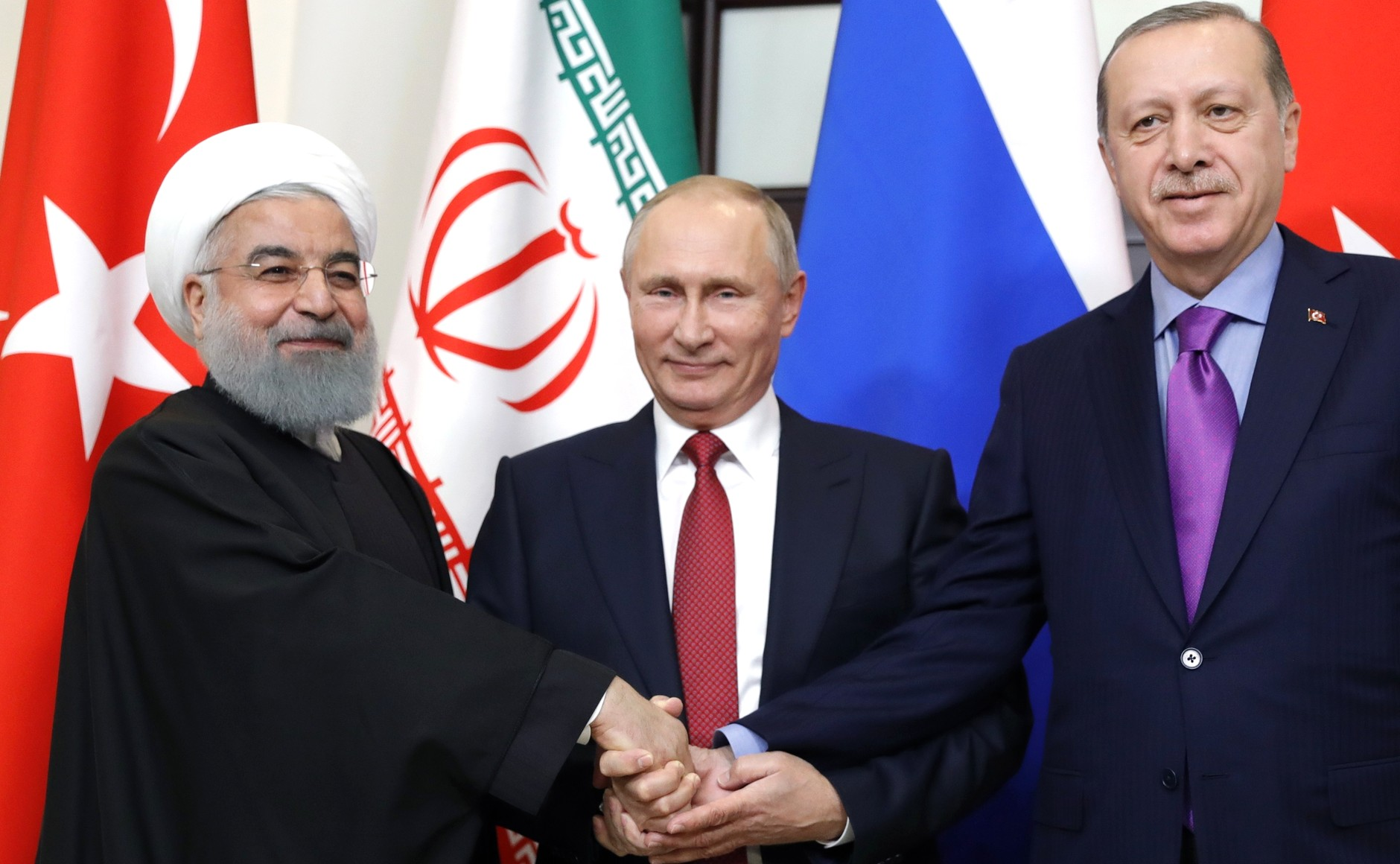
Iranian President Hassan Rouhani, Russian President Vladimir Putin and Turkish President Recep Tayyip Erdoğan in November 2017

The Turco-Russian confrontation took place between Turkey and, initially, the Syrian government, and turned into a military crisis between Turkey and Russia after November 2015, when the Turkish Air Force shot down a Russian Sukhoi Su-24 operating in Northern Latakia after a reported airspace violation. Increased Russian military intervention on behalf of the Syrian Government and hostile Turkish territorial responses have all contributed to increasing escalation. Aerial confrontations between two nations have grown more common. Turkey said the Russian Armed Forces violated Turkish sovereign airspace and committed war crimes against Syrian Turkmens. The Russian military has said Turkey had illegal economic ties with ISIS and was planning military intervention in Syria. Bilateral tensions gradually improved following the shootdown. On 22 February 2016, U.S. and Russia announced a deal for a truce to take effect in Syria on 27 February, referred to as a "cessation of hostilities", but the Turkish government did not cooperate, as the PYD and YPG were involved in the cease-fire.

In December 2015, Erdoğan rejected to join the anti-ISIL Russia–Syria–Iran–Iraq coalition, due to the presence of Syria's president Bashar al-Assad. During an International Syria Support Group meeting in Vienna on 17 May 2016, Turkish Foreign Minister Mevlüt Çavuşoğlu told Lavrov that he would resign if Moscow has any evidence that Turkey is helping ISIL. A new round of meetings for the Astana summit process took place in December 2019, and included Russia, Syria, Turkey and Iran. Several experts said the conflict was slowly moving towards resolution, and Russian political scientist Konstantin Truevstev said that Turkey, Russia, and Iran were interested in resolving the conflict. Experts also said that Bashar al-Assad had made progress in restoring rule by local councils in areas affected by the conflict.

On 26 June 2016, Erdoğan wrote to Russian President Vladimir Putin, offering condolences to the family of the deceased Russian pilot of the Sukhoi Su-24 warplane that shot down. The Kremlin Regiment has asked for a personal apology for months, and a Turkish spokesman said this is a step toward improving bilateral relations between the two countries. On 1 July 2016, Turkish and Russian foreign ministers said that the two countries will "coordinate" their policies over Syria. On 7 October 2017, Turkish forces launched an operation to establish observation posts in the northern Idlib Governorate, in coordination with Russia.

==== Second Northern Syria Buffer Zone ====
Following Operation Peace Spring, Turkey and Russia increased collaboration in northern Syria. Several commentators in Moscow stated at the time that the situation was not in immediate Russian interests, as the Turkish intervention in Syria clashed with Russia's backing of the Syrian government in the region, but it provided opportunities for Russia as a mediator as the U.S. withdrew from Syria.

On 15 October 2019, the Russian Ministry of Defense announced that Russian forces had started patrolling the region along the line of contact between Turkish and Syrian forces, indicating that Russia was filling the security vacuum from the sudden U.S. withdrawal.

Meanwhile, Russia arranged for negotiations between the Syrian government in Damascus and the Kurdish-led forces. Alexander Lavrentiev, Russia's special envoy on Syria, warned against the Turkish offensive into Syria, stating that Russia was seeking to prevent conflict between Turkish and Syrian troops. SDF commander-in-chief Mazloum Abdi announced on 13 October 2019 that they were ready to partner with Vladimir Putin and Assad, stating that "if we have to choose between compromises and the genocide of our people, we will surely choose life for our people." According to Syrian Kurdish officials, the deal allowed Syrian government forces to take over security in some border areas, but their own administration would maintain control of local institutions. On the other hand, Russia said it would pledge to replace Turkish forces with Russian forces at a key highway in northern Syria. It was reported that the Russian and Turkish armies had made a deal in which electricity would be supplied to Tell Abyad by Russia's allies, the Kurdish-led SDF who support Assad; while water would be supplied by the Turkish-controlled Alouk water station. This deal was mainly facilitated by Russian military officials. In December 2019, under the supervision of Russian armoured vehicles, Turkey withdrew all of its forces from al-Shirkark silos, which hold important supplies of wheat.

Mustafa Bali, head of the SDF, said there were some agreements on the ground with the Syrian government for Syrian forces to be deployed along the border. Russian military officials forged agreements between Syria, Turkey and Kurds for areas to be patrolled by each side. In December 2019, Russian and Turkish forces resumed their joint patrols, but questions remained about how much control Turkey has over its proxies, such as the Free Syrian Army.

== Post-Assad Syria ==
In the months leading up to the 2024 Syrian opposition offensives that resulted in the fall of the Assad regime, Turkey sought a reconciliation with Assad to mitigate the threat to Turkey from Kurdish militias and discuss the resettlement of Syrian refugees. The Assad regime insisted on the complete withdrawal of Turkish forces from Syria, a demand which was echoed by Russia in November 2024. On 27 November 2024, Syrian opposition forces launched an offensive against the Assad government. Turkey was not directly involved in the HTS-led offensive and had previously opposed a major rebel attack. After Ankara's diplomatic efforts with Damascus failed, however, it no longer opposed the operation; Le Monde reported that Turkey had refused an HTS offensive in October but "this time did not oppose the launch of the attack" on 27 November, describing Ankara's position as a "green light". Reuters similarly reported that opposition planners had informed Turkey of the planned offensive about six months earlier and believed that they had received Ankara's tacit approval. Turkish officials denied that Ankara had approved or directed the offensive.

Following the fall of the Assad regime, Turkey and Turkish-backed Syrian National Army fighters in northern Syria continued their offensive against U.S.-backed Syrian Democratic Forces. The Syrian rebels' quick progress against the Assad regime paved the way for a renewed Turkish offensive against Kurdish forces. Beginning on 30 November 2024 with Operation Dawn of Freedom, the offensive aims to expand Turkish-controlled territory, weaken the SDF, prevent Kurdish autonomy in post-Assad Syria, and align with Turkish initiatives to establish a 30-kilometer deep buffer zone in northern Syria. On 9 December 2024, SNA fighters captured the city of Manbij, and the subsequent Kobani offensive was launched with the intent to capture the Kurdish-majority city of Kobani.

Ibrahim Kalın, the head of the Turkish Intelligence Organization (MİT), stated in the 2025 annual report that they had been actively involved in the Syrian crisis from its beginning to its resolution and had operated as part of efforts to build a new state in Syria, adding that the agency had taken proactive measures to address any potential threats to Turkey in Syria.

In February 2025, the Turkish-controlled areas of northern Aleppo Governorate transferred to the Syrian transitional government. Areas of Tell Abyad and Ras al-Ayn Districts have been under the administration of the transitional government since March 2025, but Turkish troops still remain. Military occupation in the rest of the Aleppo Governorate ended in March 2025, but occupation in the Afrin District ended in September 2025. By January 2026, all of the aforementioned areas are under the administration of the Syrian transitional government, as the remaining Syrian National Army was incorporated into the Ministry of Defense in 2025.

== Criticisms ==
The Turkish government, along with Turkish-affiliated groups such as the Sultan Murad Division and Ahrar al-Sharqiya, has been accused by Amnesty International, the United Nations, and U.S. sources of committing war crimes, such as the burning of white phosphorus and executing Kurdish captives. Furthermore, Turkey has targeted and killed journalists that have covered scandals and events of the Syrian civil war, most notably, Press TV journalist Serena Shim in 2014, and, through Ahrar al-Sharqiya, murdered the Kurdish-Syrian politician Hevrin Khalaf in 2019. On the other hand, the Turkish government has denied involvement in attacks, such as the air raid on a civilian convoy near Ras al-Ayn, which, according to the SOHR, was conducted by Turkish aircraft. Furthermore, the 2021 and 2022 Country Reports on Human Rights Practices, the UN Commission of Inquiry for Syria, the Office of the United Nations High Commissioner for Human Rights, and human rights organizations mentioned that Turkish-affiliated groups committed human rights abuses in Syria, including killings, torture, sexual violence, transfer of detained civilians across the border into Turkey, enforced demographic changes targeting Kurdish Syrians, recruitment of child soldiers, and the looting and desecration of religious sites and private property.

A study by Metropoll in September 2019 found that 68% of Turks disapproved of the government's policies on Syria. The poll also found that 47.5% of Turks see the Free Syrian Army as an enemy. Three out of four Turks said that Syrian refugees should return to Syria regardless of whether the civil war continued or not. According to another survey by Metropoll, the amount of support for the 2019 Turkish offensive into north-eastern Syria was at 79%, while Operation Olive Branch had 71% support.

=== Targeting Kurds ===
Turkey and Turkish-affiliated ISIS groups have targeted ethnic Kurdish groups since September 2014, when Turkish security forces dispersed Kurds who had gathered at the border to cross into Syria and fight with Kurdish militants against ISIS. In July 2015, a former ISIS member mentioned that Turkey's targeting of Syrian Kurds made a positive impression on ISIS, and an ex-ISIS source said in January 2018 that Turkey was recruiting and retraining ISIS fighters in order to participate in the Turkish military operation in Afrin against the Kurds. In addition, in a statement carried by Al Jazeera Arabic, The Pentagon said that Turkish military operations in Afrin impeded the process of eliminating ISIS. In January 2016, Turkey denied Kurdish groups from taking part in peace talks in Geneva, as Davutoğlu deemed the YPG's participation a 'direct threat' to his country. On 17 February 2016, at least 500 armed fighters crossed the Turkish border heading for the Syrian town of Azaz to fight against the Kurdish forces, according to the head of the SOHR, after the U.S. had urged Turkey to focus on fighting ISIL instead. After the February 2016 Ankara bombing, the head of the Syrian Kurdish Democratic Union Party (PYD) denied any involvement and said that Turkey used the attack as a "pretext" to intervene in Syria.

In October 2019, Democratic representative Eric Swalwell and Republican senator Lindsey Graham called for possibly removing Turkey from NATO, provided that Turkey went after U.S.-allied Kurdish forces who aided in the fall of ISIS. Graham also stated he would "introduce bipartisan sanctions against Turkey if they invade Syria". Moreover, the International Bar Association condemned the assaults against Syrian Kurds by Turkish forces in northern Syria, and called on Turkey to halt the attacks and respect the civilians as it is obligated by international laws, after the reports of Turkish-backed militias executing civilians.

=== Alleged collusion with extremists ===
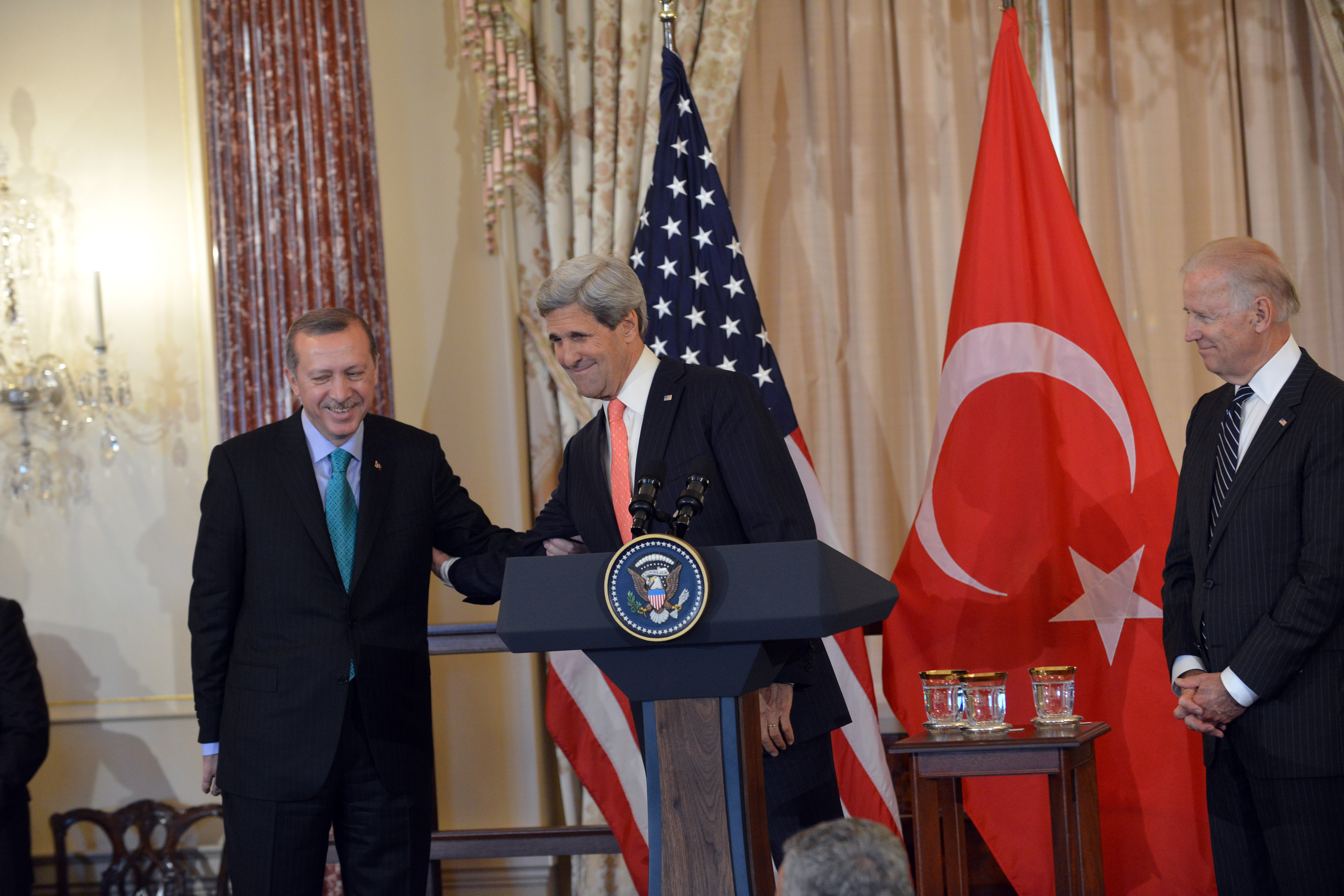
Former U.S. Vice President Joe Biden apologized for saying Turkey was supporting jihadis in a speech at Harvard's Kennedy School on 2 October 2014.

Ever since ISIL was founded from its Islamist predecessor groups in June 2014, Turkey has faced numerous allegations of collaborating with and supporting them in international media. Turkish authorities have also openly supported al-Qaeda and other extremist Islamist groups like Ahrar al-Sham, and al-Nusra Front, which is proscribed as a terror organization by much of the U.S. and Europe. In addition, the SOHR said that the vehicle used in a car bombing attack in Kobani, in which Islamic State snipers were hiding in grain depots on the Turkish side of the border and firing on the town, had come from Turkish territory. In late 2014, several ISIL fighters and commanders, as well as David L. Phillips of Columbia University's Institute for the Study of Human Rights, said that Turkey supported ISIL. Within Turkey itself, ISIL is reported to have caused increasing political polarisation between secularists and Islamists, and in 2019, the United States Department of the Treasury imposed sanctions on Turkish individuals and companies for providing financial support to ISIS, raising questions about Turkish commitment to fight ISIS networks inside the country.

On the other hand, journalist Patrick Cockburn wrote in late 2014 that the "exact nature of the relationship [between Turkey and ISIS] remains cloudy", and in 2015, Cypriot Foreign Minister Ioannis Kasoulidis questioned Turkey's determination to fight ISIS. In an email to The Guardian, Noam Chomsky called Erdoğan hypocritical for blaming ISIS for the January 2016 Istanbul bombing while supporting ISIS and al-Nusra Front. In July 2014, James Carver, a Member of the European Parliament, made two questions in the European Commission after some press reports about Turkish support for ISIS. In August, the Commission responded that there is no evidence to support press allegations, adding that the Turkish Ministry of Foreign Affairs has repeatedly dismissed them, and that ISIS poses a significant security threat to Turkey. After the November 2015 Paris attacks, Turkey implemented tougher controls to stop ISIL militants crossing and smuggling equipment on a 60-mile stretch of the border with Syria where ISIL had control of the Syrian side. This also followed Russian President Vladimir Putin directly saying that Turkey was aiding ISIL and al-Qaeda.

Despite the allegations, Turkey has fought against ISIL in numerous instances. On 23 July 2015, a Turkish sergeant was killed by fire from ISIL forces in Syria, and four Turkish tanks returned fire into ISIL-held territory in Syria. The following day, the Turkish government announced that in order to prevent an attempted invasion by ISIL troops, Turkish F-16 Fighting Falcons struck ISIL targets across the border from Kilis Province with smart bombs, escalating tensions between the two parties. According to a U.S. report, the Turkish strikes in September and October 2023 caused the SDF, which was previously working with Coalition forces, to halt operations against ISIS. Furthermore, Turkish forces killed SDF personnel, including senior commanders, and the Turkish strikes increased tensions between the SDF and U.S. forces, partly because Turkey and the United States are allies.

Turkey was further criticized for allowing individuals to enter the country and join ISIL in Syria, as well as training ISIS members and allowing jihadist groups to move through its territory in order to reach other countries. American website Al-Monitor stated in June 2014 that Turkey had allowed ISIL to let thousands of international jihadists and other supplies reach Syria through the Turkish border, and an ISIL commander stated that a majority of the soldiers, weapons, and supplies came from Turkey, adding that ISIL fighters received treatment in Turkish hospitals. Various political figures, such as Iraqi Prime Minister Haider al-Abadi, Iran's Secretary of the Expediency Discernment Council, and Israeli defense minister Moshe Ya'alon, as well as The Jerusalem Post, have accused Turkey of allowing ISIS to smuggle goods such as oil through their borders.

Leaked documents further support Turkey's close affiliation with ISIL. In January 2016, The Guardian revealed documents indicating that ISIL managed a complex immigration operation via the Syrian town of Tell Abyad, which remained open until Kurdish forces captured it during the Tell Abyad offensive. Aymenn al-Tamimi, a researcher on ISIS documents, confirmed the authenticity of the manifests, which aligned with ISIS bus routes. A senior Turkish official said Turkey was actively working to halt the influx of foreign fighters and targeting recruitment and logistics networks referenced in the documents. In July 2016, a leaked confidential report produced by the German Interior Ministry said Turkey was supporting terrorist groups across the Middle East including various Islamist groups fighting in Syria. According to documents revealed in 2019, the MİT was secretly transporting ammunition and fighters into Syria with buses in 2015. In addition, Turkish newspaper Cumhuriyet published video footage which it said showed security forces discovering weapons parts being sent to Syria in MİT-owned trucks. The Turkish government gave orders to the officers to let the trucks pass into Syria. In June 2019, a Turkish court convicted the group officers and prosecutors, who stopped the MİT trucks, to over 20 years in prison for obtaining and disclosing confidential state documents. They were also said to be FETÖ members. In December 2020, the Turkish court sentenced 27 people to prison for stopping the MİT trucks in 2014.

Former Syrian president Bashar al-Assad has repeatedly condemned Turkey's affiliation with terrorist organizations; during a 2015 interview, Assad mentioned that military and logistic support from Turkey was the key factor in the 2015 Idlib offensive. He also blamed Turkey for the failure of a humanitarian ceasefire plan in Aleppo. His sentiment was shared by Iranian analysts, who said that Turkey is the main culprit in supporting the terrorist movements of ISIL.

=== Antiquities smuggling ===
In 2016, Russian envoy Vitaly Churkin reported in an official letter to the UN that antiquities were smuggled from Syria and Iraq to Turkey, primarily through Gaziantep, where they were illegally auctioned. He noted the emergence of new smuggling hubs on the Turkish-Syrian border, facilitated by Turkish transport companies. Smuggled items reached İzmir, Mersin, and Antalya, where international criminal groups forged documentation for the artifacts. Turkey has pledged to investigate these allegations, asserting that they are politically motivated. In 2015, Syria's antiquities chief said Turkey refused to return looted objects from ancient heritage sites in Syria or to provide information about them. Also, Turkey said that it allows ISIL to smuggle Syrian antiquities through the country.

Reports emerged again in 2019 that, following Operation Olive Branch, more than 16,000 artifacts such as glass, pottery and mosaics, mostly from Afrin District, were looted and smuggled to Turkey by Syrian rebels. In 2022, the Russian Defense Ministry said that Turkish-backed forces illegally performed excavations in northern Syria by using explosives and heavy equipment that destroyed ancient sites; in response, Turkey deployed soldiers in some of the ancient sites and started an operation to retrieve smuggled Syrian items in Turkey.

=== Water supplies ===
In March 2020, nongovernmental organizations, the World Health Organization and the Kurdish-led administration in northeast Syria said that the water supply from the Alouk pumping station had been repeatedly interrupted after Turkey and its allies took control of the Alouk water station after the Turkish offensive in October 2019. In addition, local authorities and humanitarian groups in Northeast Syria said that they are unable to bring additional supplies into the region because the border with the Kurdistan Region of Iraq is closed. They all warned against doing these in the midst of the COVID-19 pandemic.

In August 2020, the Assad regime and the Kurds accused Turkey and its allies of cutting off water to al-Hasakah Governorate. The deputy United Nations Humanitarian Coordinator for Syria told the Security Council that there were frequent water cuts in al-Hasakah and al-Hawl. The Permanent Representative of Turkey to the United Nations, Feridun Sinirlioğlu, denied the accusations, adding that the water station is powered from a dam, which is controlled by the Syrian Democratic Forces.
