= Turkish Armed Forces casualties in Syria =

During the course of the Syrian Civil War limited fighting at the Syria–Turkey border and Turkish military cross-border operations have caused casualties in the Turkish Armed Forces.

== List of fatalities by operation ==
The following is a list of the fatal casualties among the regular Turkish Armed Forces by operation. In total 298–347 Turkish Forces servicemen have been reported killed:

Operation	Date of operation	Number of deaths	Opponents
Prior to Operation Euphrates Shield	22 June 2012 – 23 August 2016	17	Islamic State (IS), People's Protection Units (YPG), Syrian Armed Forces (SAF) & smugglers
Operation Euphrates Shield	24 August 2016 – 29 March 2017	72	Syrian Democratic Forces (SDF) & IS
Operation Olive Branch	20 January 2018 – 9 August 2019	61–96	SDF & SAF
Turkish military operation in Idlib Governorate	7 October 2017 – 6 March 2020	61–75 (Note: Presented Turkish losses during the operation in Idlib Governorate do not include initial claims of 50–100 dead in the February 2020 Balyun airstrikes. Instead, they include 34 soldiers killed in the airstrike confirmed by Turkey.)	SAF and allies & al-Qaeda
Operation Peace Spring	9 October 2019 – 25 November 2019	11	SDF & SAF
After Operation Peace Spring	26 November 2019 – present	76 (Note: 2020: 19 killed; 2021: 30 killed; 2022: 16 killed; 2023: 11 killed)	SDF & SAF

In addition to the military fatalities: one Turkish civilian worker was killed in the area of Operation Olive Branch, two Turkish civilian contractors were killed during operations in the Idlib Governorate and two Turkish civilian drivers were killed in the area of Operation Peace Spring, following the operation's conclusion.

== See also ==
- List of aviation shootdowns and accidents during the Syrian Civil War that include Turkish aircraft lost during the Syrian civil war.
