= Ahrar al-Sharqiya =

Armed Syrian rebel group

- تجمع احرار الشرقية
- Leaders: Abu Hatem Shaqra; Abu Jaafar Jazra; Abu Jaafar Shaqra
- Dates active: September 2016–January 2025
- Split from: Ahrar al-Sham
- Groups: Badr Martyrs' Battalion; Shields of Hasakah
- Active regions: Aleppo Governorate, Syria; Turkey
- Ideology: Sunni Islamism; Anti-Kurdish sentiment Turkophilia
- Size: over 2,000
- Part of: Free Syrian Army; Syrian National Army: Liberation and Construction Movement
- Wars: the Syrian Civil War
- Website: twitter.com/ahraralsharqia

Tajammu Ahrar al-Sharqiya (lit. 'Gathering of Free Men of the East'), commonly referred to as Ahrar al-Sharqiya, was an armed Syrian rebel group founded in 2016 by individuals exiled and displaced mostly from the Deir ez-Zor Governorate and other eastern provinces, such as the Hasakah Governorate, by ISIL, YPG and the Syrian government due to fighting that took place there between 2011 and 2014. Many fighters in Ahrar al-Sharqiya were former al-Nusra and Ahrar al-Sham members.

In October 2019, the relatively obscure group garnered international attention after its fighters murdered Kurdish politician Hevrin Khalaf, which the UN described as a war crime.

Ahrar al-Sharqiya is reported to have supported Turkish-led military offensives in eastern Syria against the Syrian Democratic Forces and Kurdish self-rule regions in northeastern Syria, According to an unidentified activist in Afrin, Ahrar al-Sharqiya was among the Turkish-backed insurgent groups which volunteered to send fighters to Libya as part of a Turkish-led operation to aid the Tripoli-based Government of National Accord in December 2019.

== Background ==
Ahrar al-Sharqiya originated as a unit of Ahrar al-Sham in Deir ez-Zor and continued to function under the banner of Ahrar al-Sham even after the group was expelled from eastern Syria along with their allies including al-Nusra to Idlib and took part in battles against the Syrian government and their allies until 2016 when the group separated itself from Ahrar al-Sham to take part in Operation Euphrates Shield.

The group was announced by al-Nusra's former lead Sharia Judge in eastern Syria and Shura Council Member, Abu Maria al-Qahtani in 2016, who is originally from Iraq and has been supportive of Turkish involvement in the Syrian Civil War, whilst also being accused on multiple occasions of causing internal strife in al-Nusra, causing him to be later dismissed from his position in the group. However, the extent of his involvement after announcing the group in 2016 remains unknown, and questions have arisen as to whether he was involved or affiliated with the group at all. Many of the group's members are also from the al-Shaitat tribe. Despite tensions with ISIL, Ahrar al-Sharqiya was reported to be part of a network along with the Turkistan Islamic Party in Syria, helping smuggle ISIL members from Eastern Syria to rebel held areas such as Idlib, whilst also profiting from smuggling fees.

According to Syrian Observatory for Human Rights former ISIL members in Deir ez-Zor joined the ranks of Ahrar al-Sharqiya after the Deir ez-Zor campaign.

== History ==
On 16 September 2016, Ahrar al-Sharqiya announced that they refuse to cooperate with US forces in fighting ISIL during Operation Euphrates Shield because of their support for the People's Protection Units and Syrian Democratic Forces.

In September 2016 members of the group taunted, insulted and verbally attacked American forces in al-Rai embedded with the Al-Mu'tasim Brigade, an American spokesmen said that the group posed no threat to American forces and that American forces present were unaware of the protests to their presence, after evacuating American forces the al-Mutasim Brigade asked Ahrar al-Sharqiya members to stop.

On 25 January 2017, Ahrar al-Sharqiya executed a man near Jarabulus, accusing him of spying for the Syrian Democratic Forces.

After taking control of Afrin, fighters from the group allegedly destroyed a liquor store, and 6 fighters and their families from the group reportedly defected to SDF after taking over the area due to disillusionment.

On 25 March 2018, a day after taking control of Afrin, Ahrar al-Sharqiya and the Hamza Division clashed in Afrin after the Hamza Division killed an Ahrar al-Sharqiya commander, Ahrar al-Sharqiya also claimed the Hamza Division was looting and stealing on western instruction, during the fighting Ahrar al-Sharqiya seized several checkpoints from the Hamza Division and captured up to 100 fighters from the group.

On 26 March 2018, a day after clashing with the Hamza Division, Ahrar al-Sharqiya stormed the headquarters of the Hamza Division and arrested over 200 fighters from the Hamza Division afterwards.

In April 2018, several Hamza Division members were taken captive by Ahrar al-Sharqiya in Afrin until Turkish authorities intervened and settled the tensions between the Hamza Division and Ahrar al-Sharqiya.

In July 2018, Ahrar al-Sharqiya began a campaign in Afrin encouraging women to wear the hijab and loose clothing according Islamic law that included putting up posters and handing out fliers in the city.

In October 2018, members from the group reportedly coordinated with Turkish authorities to arrest an ISIL member being treated in a hospital in the city of Mersin in Turkey.

In November 2018, Turkish forces and allied FSA groups carried out an operation against the Sharqiya Martyrs, a unit belonging to Ahrar al-Sharqiya consisting of 200 fighters, accusing them of not following Turkish orders and committing abuses.

On 9 January 2019, the Gathering of the Eastern Martyrs, which is affiliated with Ahrar al-Sharqiya, claimed responsibility for an IED attack on an SDF humvee in the Deir ez-Zor Governorate.

On 12 January 2019, unknown gunmen killed 4 members of the Gathering of the Eastern Martyrs at a checkpoint in a village near al-Rai.

On 25 January 2019, a fight broke out between an arms dealer and Ahrar al-Sharqiya; in the fight the arms dealer was killed while two of his family members were wounded and two Ahrar al-Sharqiya members were also wounded.

On 5 February 2019, Ahrar al-Sharqiya reportedly clashed with the Nour al-Din al-Zenki Movement in Afrin; the reason for the fight is unknown and heavy weapons were reportedly used.

In June 2019, the group sent reinforcements from Afrin to Idlib and Hama to help other rebel groups in the area repel a Syrian government-led offensive against rebel-held areas that began in April.

On 12 October 2019, fighters from Ahrar al-Sharqiya taking part in a Turkish-led military offensive in eastern Syria against the Syrian Democratic Forces and Kurdish self-rule regions in northeastern Syria, executed Kurdish politician, Hevrin Khalaf on the M4 highway in northern Syria after capturing it from SDF. According to an unidentified activist in Afrin, Ahrar al-Sharqiya was among the Turkish-backed insurgent groups which volunteered to send fighters to Libya as part of a Turkish-led operation to aid the Tripoli-based Government of National Accord in December 2019.

In 2021 a report by the SOHR stated that Ahrar al-Sharqiya members killed a civilian due to refusing to pay off the debt of a construction worker, in response Anrar al-Shaqiya responded by summarily executing the construction worker by shooting him in the head, and dumping his body in Tel Diyab village.

On 29 January 2025, as part of the Syrian National Army, the group announced its dissolution and incorporation into the Ministry of Defense at the Syrian Revolution Victory Conference.

== Relationship with other groups ==
The group has participated in Turkish led operations against YPG but has come into conflict with groups it allied with in these operations over things such as the distribution of captured equipment and property. Such cases arose in Al-Bab, Al-Rai and Jarabulus in 2016 and again in Afrin city in 2018. On 6 November 2018, the group reportedly clashed with Jaysh al-Islam in Afrin. However, after the clashes between Ahrar al-Sharqiya and Jaysh al-Islam, the two groups released a joint statement apologizing to each other for the violence and agreed to resolve disputes in court and avoid armed confrontations. Abu Hatem Shaqra, one of its commanders, lived in Turkey and studied and graduated from the Artuklu University in Mardin. Shaqra received an award from the Turkish backed administration in Syria in February 2019. According to the US State Department, many former ISIS members are part of the group.

== Sanctions ==
The group was sanctioned by the United States State Department in 2021.
