= Killing of Hevrin Khalaf =

Kurdish-Syrian politician and civil engineer (1984–2019)

Hevrin Khalaf
- Hevrîn Xelef
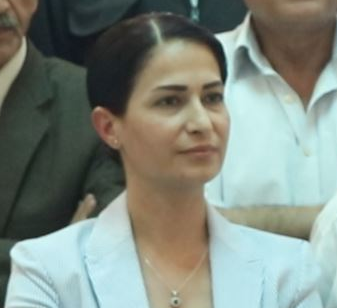
- Hevrin Khalaf in 2019
- Born: 15 November 1984; Al-Malikiyah, Syria
- Died: 12 October 2019 (aged 34); M4 Motorway, Rojava, Syria
- Cause of death: Executed by Turkish-backed Ahrar al-Sharqiya militants
- Education: University of Aleppo
- Occupations: Civil engineer; Politician

Hevrin Khalaf (Kurdish: Hevrîn Xelef, Arabic: هفرين خلف, also Khelef; 15 November 1984 – 12 October 2019) was a Syrian Kurd politician and civil engineer. Khalaf served as the Secretary General of the Future Syria Party after working for many years in Rojava. She was executed by Turkish-backed Ahrar al-Sharqiya fighters near the M4 Motorway south of Tell Abyad during the 2019 Turkish offensive into north-eastern Syria, on 12 October.

== Early life and education ==
Khalaf was born on 15 November 1984 in Al-Malikiyah. Early in her life, Khalaf was exposed to political movements and thinkers. Four of her brothers and her sister Zozan were involved in the Kurdish liberation movement; they all died. Khalaf's mother, Sûad, took part in assemblies with Abdullah Öcalan. Khalaf was influenced by her mother's experiences. Khalaf graduated from University of Aleppo in 2009 as a civil engineer.

== Career ==
Soon after graduating, Khalaf returned to Al-Malikiyah. When the Rojava conflict began, Khalaf worked on creating institutions that would improve civil society. She began managing one of the Economic Councils. Khalaf rose to prominence in the Autonomous Administration of North and East Syria. She was one of the founders of the Foundation for Science and Free Thought in 2012.

=== Future Syria Party ===
Khalaf became co-chair of the energy authority in 2016. Her party, the Future Syria Party, was involved in the administration of northern Syria after the capture of Raqqa from the Islamic State group in 2017. Khalaf participated in negotiations with the United States, France, and other delegations. She was known for her skill in diplomacy. Khalaf worked towards increasing tolerance and unity among Christians, Arabs, and Kurds. Aden Al Hendi described Khalaf's work ethic in Foreign Policy as such: “She would wake up at 5 in the morning and would not stop working until midnight, whether that involved traveling to the Deir Ezzor region, which was recently liberated from the Islamic State, to tutor children and teenagers there in math, or meeting with Arab tribal leaders and helping resolve their many disputes in her role as the secretary-general of the Future Syria Party (FSP). She personified the way the FSP and the Syrian Democratic Council approached the many differences among the people of the region.”

“Eight years have passed. The popular uprising against the crisis and the struggle of the peoples of Syria have been carried out with great sacrifice, and have turned into a war. The lasting crisis in Syria, which has caused the expulsion and murder of the population, cannot be resolved without a political solution.”

== Assassination ==
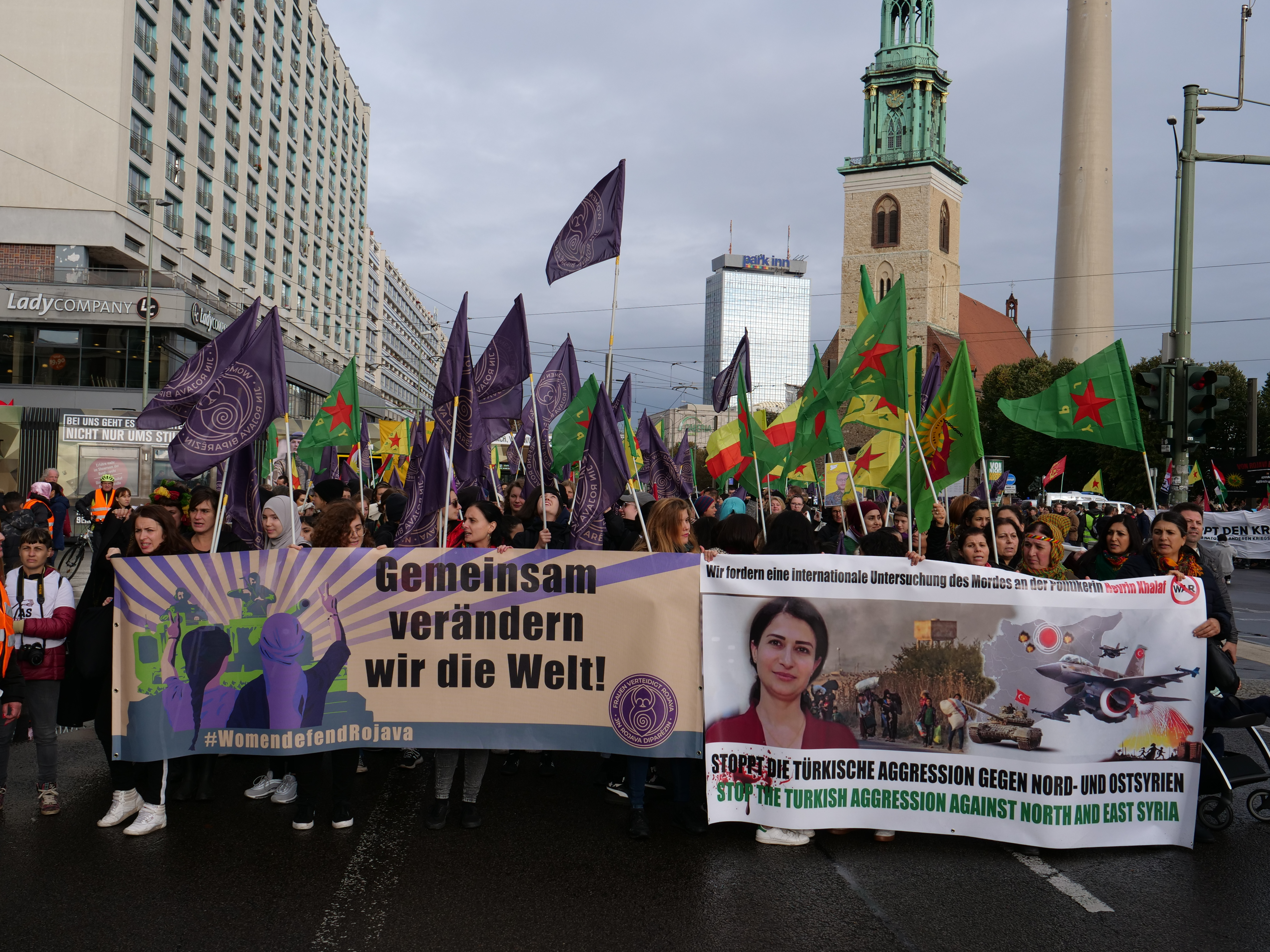
Protest in Berlin against Turkey's military operation, showing her image

On 13 October 2019, The Daily Telegraph reported that "Kurdish officials said rebel fighters intercepted a car carrying Hevrin Khalaf". Khalaf was one of a number of civilians who were killed during the first days of the Turkish-backed military operation, with the Syrian Observatory for Human Rights reporting that "nine civilians were executed at different moments south of the town of Tal Abyad". The National Army, a rebel group fighting alongside Turkey, denied responsibility for the killing. Khalaf's death was one of many during Operation Peace Spring, which began on 9 October 2019.

According to an autopsy report, Khalaf was beaten over her head and left leg with a solid object. This led to multiple bone fractures in the leg. There was then use of sharp objects on the back of her legs. Furthermore, Khalaf was dragged by her hair which caused it to tear off along with bits of flesh. She was then shot in the head once and four more times in her chest.

Kurdish analyst Mutlu Civiroglu, told The Guardian that Khalaf's death was a "great loss", and described her as having "a talent for diplomacy". Future Syria Party released a statement saying, "With utmost grievance and sadness, the Syria Future Party mourns the martyrdom of engineer Hevrin Khalaf, the General Secretary of Syria Future Party, while she was performing her patriotic and political duties". Khalaf was 34 at the time of her death. A video which circulated on social media purportedly showed the bullet-ridden vehicle in which Khalaf had been travelling with translators and other Kurdish personnel surrounded by Turkish-backed Syrian rebels.

A Bellingcat video traces the cause of Khalaf's death to rebels backed by Turkey and further reports that the group Ahrar al-Sharqiya is associated with the murders. While al-Sharqiya has denied involvement with her death, there have been videos alleging otherwise. One such video shows a body, face down, that is suspected by most to be Khalaf with a Turkish backed soldier standing over her. In the video, the soldier taps the body with his feet and says "this is the corpse of pigs."

According to The Washington Post, the killing "almost certainly constitute[d] a war crime, under international law". While Turkish-backed groups deny any and all allegations, many videos of their involvement and complicity have been leaked, similar to the video that was potentially a depiction of Khalaf. Furthermore, many groups were instructed on an encrypted chat site called 'Telegram' "not to publish any video filmed during the battles because it distorts our reputation."

Her funeral was held in Al-Malikiyah on 14 October 2019.

In January 2020, the BBC's Arabic service published an investigation into the death of Hevrin Khalaf which found that a sub-group of the Turkey-backed Syrian National Army, Ahrar al-Sharqiya, had extrajudiciarily murdered Khalaf on the M4 Motorway, at the Tirwaziya checkpoint. Ahrar al-Sharqiya responded to the BBC's investigation, stating that "The group that set up the checkpoint on the M4 that day did so without permission... Those who violated orders from leadership have been sent for trial."
