= Fall of Damascus (2024) =

2024 event in the Syrian civil war

- Part of the 2024 Syrian opposition offensives, the Rif Dimashq Governorate campaign, and the Syrian civil war
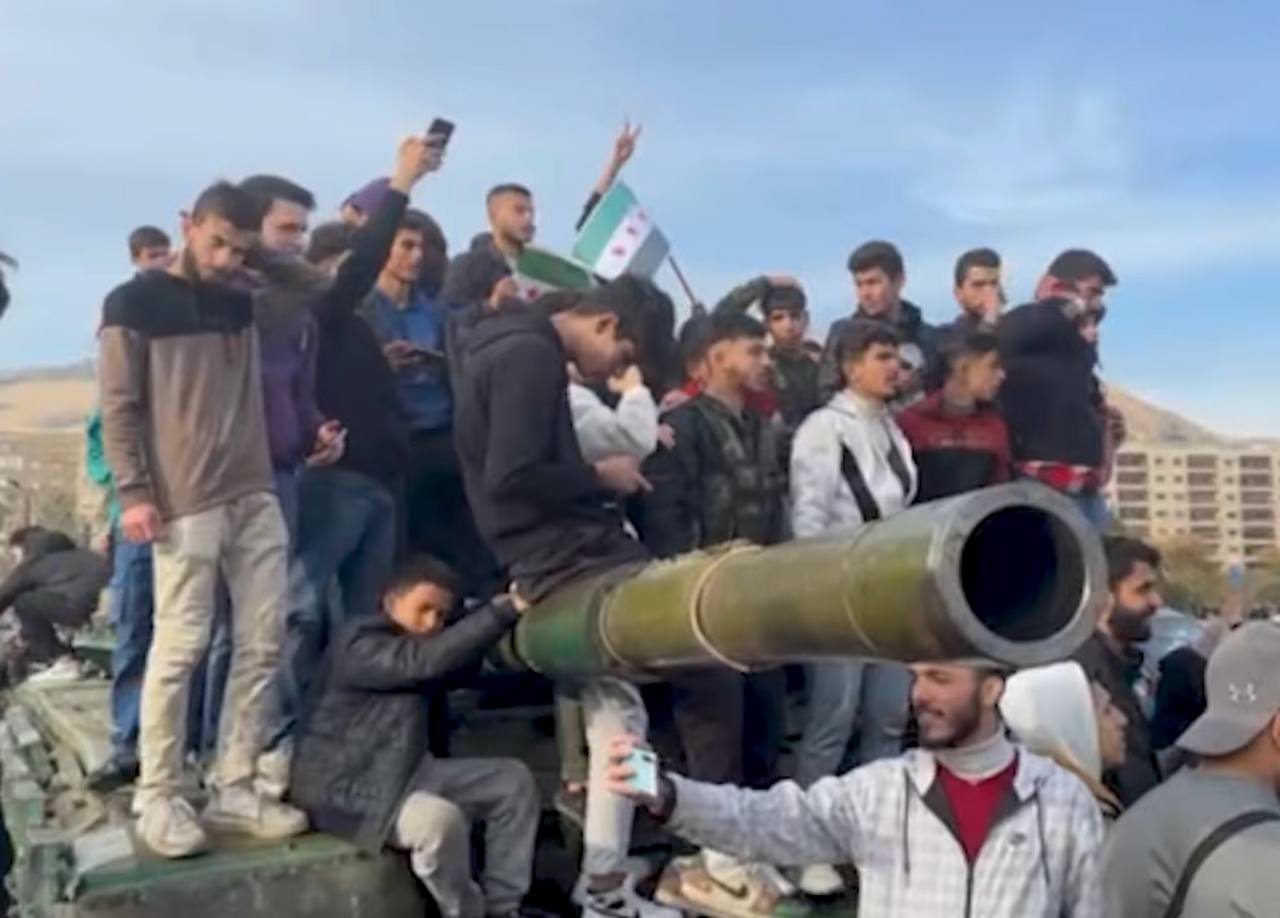
- Civilians celebrating the fall of the Assad regime in Damascus
Date	7–8 December 2024 (1 day)
Location	Damascus and Rif Dimashq Governorate, Syria
Result	Syrian opposition victory; Syrian Army surrenders the capital to the opposition; Syrian president Bashar al-Assad flees to Russia; Fall of the Assad regime; Rebels form a new government

Belligerents
(Syria) Southern Operations Room; (Syria) Syrian Free Army	Ba'athist Syria (surrendered)

Commanders and leaders
(Syria) Ahmad al-Awda (Syria) Salem Turki al-Antri	(Ba'athist Syria) Bashar al-Assad (surrendered) (Ba'athist Syria) Maher al-Assad

Units involved
Military Operations Command	Syrian Armed Forces; Syrian Army; Syrian Army Command; 4th Armoured Division

On 7 December 2024, the Syrian opposition group known as the Southern Operations Room, in co-ordination with the Military Operations Command, led forces that entered the Rif Dimashq region of Syria from the south, and those forces then came within 20 kilometres (12 mi) of the capital Damascus. The Syrian Army withdrew from multiple points in the outskirts. Concurrently with the advance towards Damascus, opposition militia Tahrir al-Sham and the Turkish-backed Syrian National Army in the north launched an offensive into Homs, while the Syrian Free Army advanced into the capital from the southeast. By 8 December 2024, rebel forces entered the city's Barzeh neighborhood. According to official state reports in Russian mass media and media footage, President Bashar al-Assad left Damascus by air to Moscow, where he was granted asylum, sealing the fall of his regime.

== Background ==
By late 2018, Syrian opposition rebel groups were forced into Idlib Governorate, the last rebel-held governorate of Syria after seven years of fighting against the Assad regime and Syrian Army during the Syrian civil war, after the SAA captured the city of Aleppo and conducted peace deals with rebel groups in the southern Daraa Governorate. Several rebel groups were present in Idlib, including the Islamist rebel group Hay'at Tahrir al-Sham (which broke away from the Al-Nusra Front), the Turkish-backed Syrian National Army, and dozens of smaller nationalist and Islamist opposition groups which largely operate in a shared command with larger groups. In Southern Syria, the opposition consisted mostly of demobilised fighters who had undergone reconciliation through previous cease-fire agreements and subsequently conducted local insurrections as Government forces withdrew in early December. An additional American-backed Syrian Free Army opposition force controlled a section of desert around the post of al-Tanf.

Between the end of the ceasefire and the start of the 2024 Syrian opposition offensives HTS leader Ahmed al-Sharaa sought peace deals with the other rebel coalitions, and hunted down Hurras al-Din and Islamic State fighters in rebel-held areas. Al-Sharaa also built institutions to digitize the rebel-held area, such as improving tax collecting, street cleaning, and food distribution, while preaching a message of unity to Syrian Christians and Shias.

In contrast, the Assad regime put more money into funding the captagon industry, transforming the country into a narcostate dependent on drug exports for revenue. Corruption ran rife after 2018, and conscripts within the SAA grew demoralized as key allies in the early years of the war such as Iran, Russia, and Hezbollah were involved in wars elsewhere.

== Prelude ==
In November 2024, a coalition of rebel groups spearheaded by HTS attacked Aleppo, quickly overrunning the demotivated and disorganized defenders. In response, Assad travelled to Russia to ask for military aid on 28 November; his request was denied. Upon returning home, however, he lied to his senior commanders and advisors, claiming that Russia would soon send aid. His wife Asma had already been in Moscow for cancer treatment for months, accompanied by their children. A few days later, the rebels captured Aleppo. Afterward, reports emerged of a coup led by Syrian State Security Director General Hossam Louka against the Assad government. The Syrian Army General Command as well as the Iranian ambassador to Syria, Hossein Akbari, both denied these reports. On 2 December, Assad met with Iranian Foreign Minister Abbas Araghchi to discuss the situation. He confided that the Syrian Armed Forces were too weak to offer effective resistance to the continuing rebel advance. Regardless, he did not request increased Iranian aid, probably due to concerns about an Israeli intervention. At this point, the Syrian president had possibly concluded that the war was already lost. Despite this, he continued to tell his inner circle that Russian support would be coming, imploring them to continue their work.

After the fall of Hama on 5 December, the government began redeploying its troops from Eastern Ghouta, including Douma and Harasta, to the entrances and exits of Damascus. However, witnesses stated that efforts to organize a proper defense quickly derailed as most officers and soldiers refused to continue resistance or outright fled. There were contradictory orders to soldiers and policemen, with commanders initially ordering them to stay at their positions or to retreat or vice versa. Only Alawite officers reportedly expressed any willingness to defend the capital. Iran began withdrawing its personnel from Syria in the early hours of 6 December 2024, pulling out top commanders of the IRGC's Quds Force and ordering evacuations at the Iranian Embassy in Damascus and at IRGC bases across Syria. Evacuating Iranians headed towards Lebanon and Iraq. China also actively assisted its citizens in leaving the country. On the same day, rebels south of Damascus announced the "Southern Operations Room" (SOR), exploiting the widespread retreat and collapse of loyalist troops in the region. SOR swiftly started to take control of southern towns and rural areas in cooperation with other opposition forces.

By the beginning of 7 December 2024, rebels had captured most of Daraa Governorate and Suwayda Governorate and granted safe passage to some pro-government forces towards Damascus. Maher al-Assad, Bashar's brother and head of the 4th Armoured Division, was tasked with defending the capital. Despite the chaos among the Syrian Armed Forces, he actually intended to do so; Maher had reportedly been told that the military's withdrawal from other regions was intended to gather all forces for a last stand at Damascus. Eventually, the 4th Division commander discovered that the chief of the general staff had ordered a general retreat from the capital, whereupon he attempted to countermand the order to little success.

== Events ==
=== Rebel entry and Assad's escape ===
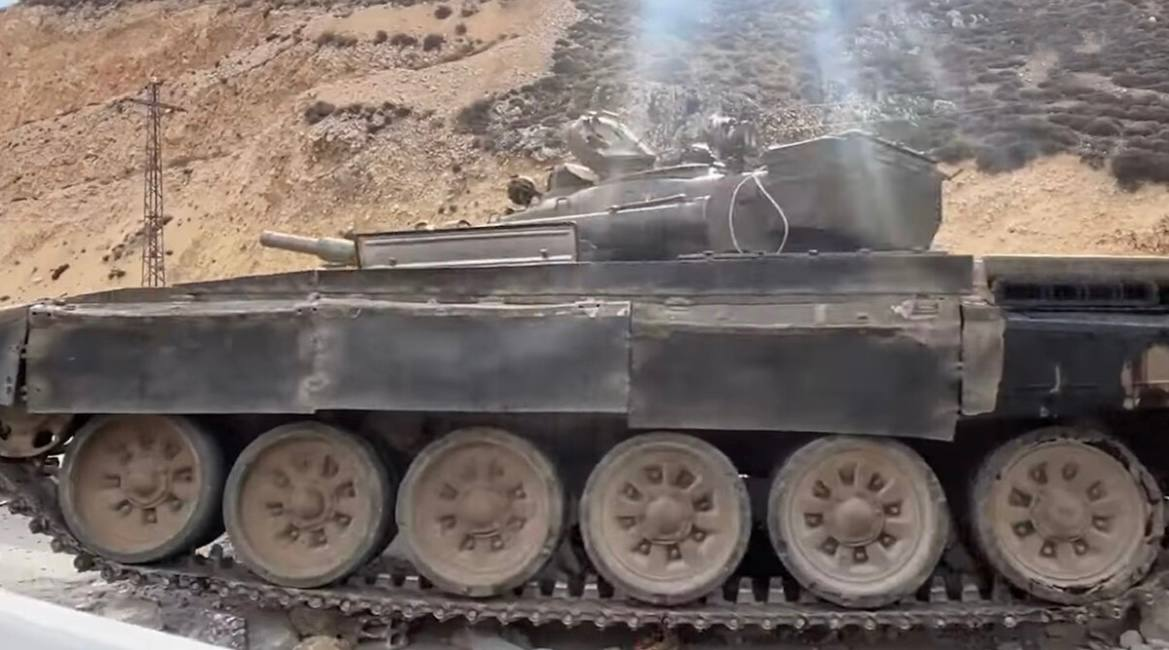
Stuck and abandoned tank of the Assad's forces on the road to Damascus, December 2024.

On 7 December 2024, Syrian rebels announced that they had started surrounding Damascus after capturing nearby towns, with rebel commander Hassan Abdul Ghani stating: "Our forces have begun implementing the final phase of encircling the capital Damascus." The rebels started encircling the capital after capturing Al-Sanamayn, a town 20 kilometres (12 mi) from the southern entrance of Damascus. In the Rif Dimashq region, pro-government forces withdrew from the towns of Assal al-Ward, Yabroud, Flitah, Al-Naseriyah and Artouz, while rebels came within 10 kilometres (6.2 mi) of Damascus. The Syrian government denied claims that its army had withdrawn from positions near the city. By the evening, pro-government forces had left the towns on the outskirts of Damascus, including Jaramana, Qatana, Muadamiyat al-Sham, Darayya, Al-Kiswah, Al-Dumayr, Daraa and sites near the Mezzeh Air Base. Maher al-Assad and his 4th Division were reportedly among the few loyalists who still tried to defend the city; his second-in-command was later found dead in his office, possibly indicating violent disputes over the orders and escapes of many military officers.

According to the Syrian Observatory for Human Rights, Syrian rebels were active in the Damascus suburbs of Jaramana, Muadamiyah, and Darayya, and were marching from the east toward Harasta. In the main square of Jaramana, protestors took down a statue of Hafez al-Assad. In the evening, pro-government forces reportedly withdrew from several suburbs where large-scale protests broke out. As the Southern Operations Room advanced in the suburbs of Damascus, the Syrian Free Army was reported closing in on the capital from the north, after taking control of Palmyra, as well as Darayya. The Republican Guard, traditionally tasked with protecting the Syrian government, did not organize any defenses of Damascus and offered no resistance to the rebel advances. According to The Guardian, videos showed Syrian police and army forces removing their uniforms in the streets of Damascus and an Associated Press journalist reported seeing armed residents along the roads in Damascus's outskirts and finding the city's main police headquarters abandoned. Tank movements were reported in central squares of the capital, while calls of "God is great" rang out from mosques.

Even as the situation in Damascus deteriorated, Assad reportedly pretended to work as usual, though he made no effort to organize a last stand or publicly inspire confidence among his loyalists. Syrian state media officially denied allegations that he had fled the capital. In the evening, Assad met with thirty army and security chiefs at the Ministry of Defense, and urged them to keep resisting the insurgents as Russian support was on its way. At 10:30 pm, the president received a phone call by his prime minister Mohammad Ghazi al-Jalali who informed him that the government's situation had further declined, with large numbers of refugees fleeing from Homs toward Latakia. Assad just told him "Tomorrow, we will see. Tomorrow, tomorrow," ending the call. He then phoned Bouthaina Shaaban, asking her to write a speech for him, and told his presidential office that he was driving home for the night. In truth, Assad left for an airport, secretly boarded an airplane which then flew under the radar with the aircraft's transponder switched off to Khmeimim Air Base from where he fled to Russia. He informed none of his inner circle members or even close family members of his flight, with even his brother Maher al-Assad being left behind. The Telegram account of the Syrian presidency would later publish a statement attributed to Assad, saying that he had gone to a Russian military base in Latakia Governorate "to oversee combat operations" following the fall of Damascus, but was evacuated out of the country by Russia after coming under siege from rebel forces, adding that he had no intention of resigning or going into exile. After the president had disappeared, his media director Kamel Sakr initially told journalists that Assad was going to "deliver a statement very soon". Not long after, he stopped responding to calls, as did Minister of the Interior Mohammad Khaled al-Rahmoun.

Government loyalists realized that Assad had fled upon learning that his home was deserted, with the Republican Guard also no longer deployed at his usual residence. As word of his escape spread, the remaining loyalist resistance completely collapsed. During the night, rebels announced that a "group" of senior government officials and military officers in Damascus were preparing to defect to the opposition. That same night, the Sednaya prison was captured and its inmates freed. Pro-government Sham FM radio reported that Damascus airport had been evacuated and all flights halted.

=== Rebel takeover ===
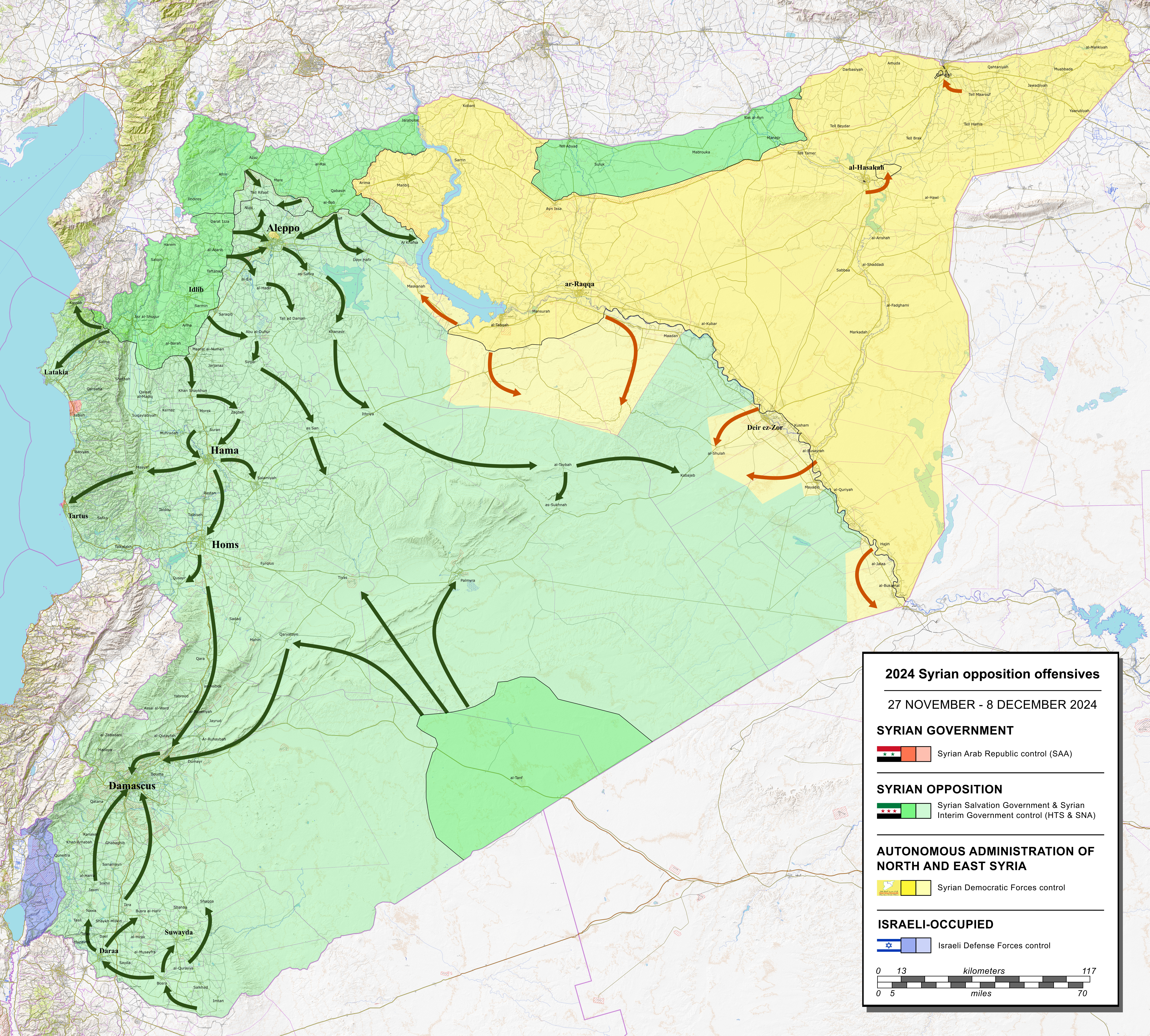
Military advances in Syria towards Damascus
Controlled by the Syrian opposition
Controlled by the Israeli Army

During the early hours of 8 December 2024, Prime Minister Ghazi al-Jalali tried to reach Assad by phone, but no one responded. Meanwhile, the Syrian Observatory for Human Rights reported that Syrian government forces were disbanding after being informed by superiors that the regime had fallen following the departure of a private flight from an airport in Damascus. The capture of Homs that same morning by Tahrir al-Sham and the Syrian National Army effectively cut Damascus off from al-Assad's coastal strongholds of Tartus and Latakia. Some government members and al-Assad family members tried to escape the encirclement. Maher al-Assad successfully fled to Iraq via helicopter, but the car of Bashar's cousins Ihab Makhlouf and Iyad Makhlouf was intercepted by rebels who killed Ihab and captured Iyad. The head of the palace security was still at his post at Assad's residence, informing fleeing soldiers that he would not abandon the location without the president. Unwilling to believe that Bashar al-Assad had left him behind, he was eventually captured by insurgents.

Within hours, all of Damascus was captured by the rebels, most of them belonging to the SOR. A group of opposition figures announced their victory over a Syrian state television broadcast. Simultaneously, Prime Minister Ghazi al-Jalali expressed his readiness to "extend its hand" to the opposition. The Syrian Army Command put two contradictory statements out: one of admission of defeat and a second to continue its fight against "terrorist groups", specifically in Homs, Hama and Daraa. Soon after, Russian state media officially reported that Assad had fled to Moscow. He was subsequently "personally granted asylum" by Russian president Vladimir Putin. The spokesperson refused to comment on the specific whereabouts of Assad, saying that Putin was not planning to meet him.

== Aftermath ==
Recording of traffic through Damascus after the Fall of Assad

In the wake of the rebel capture of Damascus, several places in the capital were ransacked, including Iran's embassy, Assad's estates, and government offices; the Central Bank of Syria was besieged and the reception hall of the Presidential Palace was set on fire. Statues of Hafez al-Assad were toppled nationwide. The Russian and Chinese embassies were untouched. The rebels announced a 13-hour curfew in the capital amidst heavy armed rebel presence and traffic in the capital. Syrian State Television, now under rebel control, resumed broadcasting. Al-Assad clan members expressed resentment over the escape of Bashar and his close family, with one relative stating that "Everyone feels he betrayed them".

Israel bombed the Mezzeh Air Base in Damascus. Another strike targeted an alleged Iranian research center used for missile development in the Kafr Sousa district. The Israeli army also crossed the border into Syria, seizing territory adjacent to the border after it was abandoned by the Syrian Army.

HTS leader Ahmed al-Sharaa became the de facto leader of Syria on 8 December 2024 as the General Commander and head of the New Syrian Administration, serving until 29 January 2025, when he was appointed President of Syria by the Syrian General Command. Mohammed al-Bashir, head of the Syrian Salvation Government, was appointed prime minister of the Syrian caretaker government on 10 December and served until 29 March 2025.

== Reactions ==
- Afghanistan: The Foreign Ministry stipulated that the Assad regime was the "cause of war and instability" and congratulated Tahrir al-Sham.
- Canada: Prime Minister Justin Trudeau said that the fall of the Assad dictatorship "ends decades of brutal oppression" and said that Canada is monitoring the transition closely.
- China: The Foreign Ministry stated that it "is closely following the development of the situation in Syria and hopes that Syria returns to stability as soon as possible" and urged all parties to ensure the safety of Chinese citizens in Syria.
- European Union: EU foreign policy chief Kaja Kallas called the end of Assad's rule a "positive and long-awaited development" and stated she was in close contact with regional ministers. She emphasized that rebuilding Syria would be "long and complicated".
- France: President Emmanuel Macron commented on social media: "The barbaric state has fallen. At last. I pay tribute to the Syrian people, to their courage, to their patience." He added that France would remain committed to security in the Middle East.
- Germany: Foreign Minister Annalena Baerbock described the end of the Assad regime as "a big relief for millions of people in Syria" while warning that "the country must not fall into the hands of other radicals".
- Indonesia: The Ministry of Foreign Affairs reported that the Embassy of Indonesia in Damascus attacked by stray bullets from the Syrian Opposition Forces and causing minor damages to the building on 9 December 2024. No casualties and injured reported from the attack. The ministry asked Indonesian citizens in Syria to keep calm and avoid getting out of their residence.
- Iran: The Ministry of Foreign Affairs said it had successfully evacuated Embassy personnel.
- Qatar: Foreign Minister Sheikh Mohammed bin Abdulrahman Al Thani criticized Assad for failing to use the previous lull in fighting to address Syria's underlying problems, stating: "Assad didn't seize this opportunity to start engaging and restoring his relationship with his people."
- Russia: Following Russia's call for its citizens to leave Syria, the Russian Embassy reported that all its staff members were safe following the fall of Damascus. Russia's Foreign Ministry stated that it was in contact with "all groups of the Syrian opposition", but played no role in negotiations.
- United Kingdom: Prime minister Keir Starmer said: "The Syrian people have suffered under Assad's barbaric regime for too long and we welcome his departure. Our focus is now on ensuring a political solution prevails, and peace and stability is restored".
- United Nations: Special Envoy for Syria Geir Pedersen called for urgent talks in Geneva to ensure an "orderly political transition" and the implementation of Security Council Resolution 2254.
- United States: The White House reported that "President Biden and his team are closely monitoring the extraordinary events in Syria and staying in constant touch with regional partners". In a televised speech addressed to Americans on 8 December 2024, U.S. president Joe Biden stated: "At long last, the Assad regime has fallen. This regime brutalized, tortured, and killed literally hundreds of thousands of innocent Syrians. The fall of the regime is a fundamental act of justice".

== See also ==
- Capture of Damascus (1918)
- Battle of Damascus (2012)
- Withdrawal from Aden
- Fall of Saigon
- Fall of Phnom Penh
- Fall of Baghdad
- Battle of Sirte (2011)
- Fall of Kabul (2021)
