= CENTCOM analyst controversy =

2015 military controversy

Emblem of the United States Central Command

In August 2015, intelligence analysts working for United States Central Command (CENTCOM) complained to the media, alleging that CENTCOM's senior leadership was altering or distorting intelligence reports on the Islamic State of Iraq and the Levant (ISIL) to paint a more optimistic picture of the ongoing war against ISIL forces in Iraq and Syria.

In August 2016, a United States Congressional report found "widespread dissatisfaction" among CENTCOM's intelligence analysts. A press release on the report stated “Intelligence products approved by senior CENTCOM leaders typically provided a more positive depiction of U.S. antiterrorism efforts than was warranted by facts on the ground and were consistently more positive than analysis produced by other elements of the intelligence community."

In February 2017, the Inspector General of the United States Department of Defense completed its investigation and cleared the senior leadership of CENTCOM, concluding that "allegations of intelligence being intentionally altered, delayed or suppressed by top CENTCOM officials from mid-2014 to mid-2015 were largely unsubstantiated."

== 2015 allegations by CENTCOM analysts ==
In 2014, ISIL declared a worldwide caliphate and the US began military campaigns in Syria and Iraq to try to halt the spread of that caliphate as well as the Syrian Train and Equip Program. These efforts were conducted by the United States Central Command (CENTCOM), the U.S. geographic combatant command for the Middle East. CENTCOM military intelligence analysts were responsible with generating intelligence reports that would inform civilian leadership about the effectiveness of allied military efforts.

In July 2015, fifty CENTCOM analysts signed a complaint to the Pentagon's Inspector General that their intelligence reports were being inappropriately manipulated by members of CENTCOM. They were subsequently joined by civilian and Defense Intelligence Agency analysts working for CENTCOM. Members of the groups began anonymously leaking details of the case to the press in late-August. The analysts alleged that CENTCOM was trying to portray a rosy image of the fight against the Islamic State by altering some reports to seem more positive, while burying other reports to keep them from the press and Congress. The analysts alleged that the conclusions of both their reports about the readiness of indigenous forces to face ISIS, and about the effectiveness of the American air campaigns over Syria and Iraq, were reversed by the Administration before distribution. The media described the situation as "a revolt" inside the intelligence community. Congressional representatives vowed to investigate the matter and requested testimony from Department of Defense officials.

== 2016 Congressional report ==
In August 2016, a United States Congressional report found "widespread dissatisfaction" among CENTCOM's intelligence analysts. A press release on the report stated "Intelligence products approved by senior CENTCOM leaders typically provided a more positive depiction of U.S. antiterrorism efforts than was warranted by facts on the ground and were consistently more positive than analysis produced by other elements of the intelligence community." According to the report, "Throughout the first half of 2015, many Central Command press releases, statements and congressional testimonies were significantly more positive than actual events." The report provided an example of these overestimations, commenting that a CENTCOM official "stated publicly that a major military assault to take back Mosul could begin as early as April or May 2015."

Republicans and Democrats in Congress commented on the report. According to Republican Representative Mike Pompeo, "From the middle of 2014 to the middle of 2015, the United States Central Command's most senior intelligence leaders manipulated the command's intelligence products to downplay the threat from ISIS in Iraq." According to Democratic Representative Adam Schiff, "Between 2014 and 2015, CENTCOM created an overly insular process for producing intelligence assessments on ISIL and Iraqi Security Forces," which "stalled the release of intelligence products" and "insufficiently accommodated dissenting views."

== 2017 Inspector General's report ==
In February 2017, the Inspector General completed its investigation and cleared the senior leadership of CENTCOM, concluding that "allegations of intelligence being intentionally altered, delayed or suppressed by top CENTCOM officials from mid-2014 to mid-2015 were largely unsubstantiated." According to the commanding general of CENTCOM, General Joseph Votel, "While the allegations were unsubstantiated, the DoD IG's report did provide thoughtful and helpful recommendations on ways to make improvements within the command and we are taking those and others' recommendations to heart and acting on them."
