= Syrian Train and Equip Program =

United States-led military operation

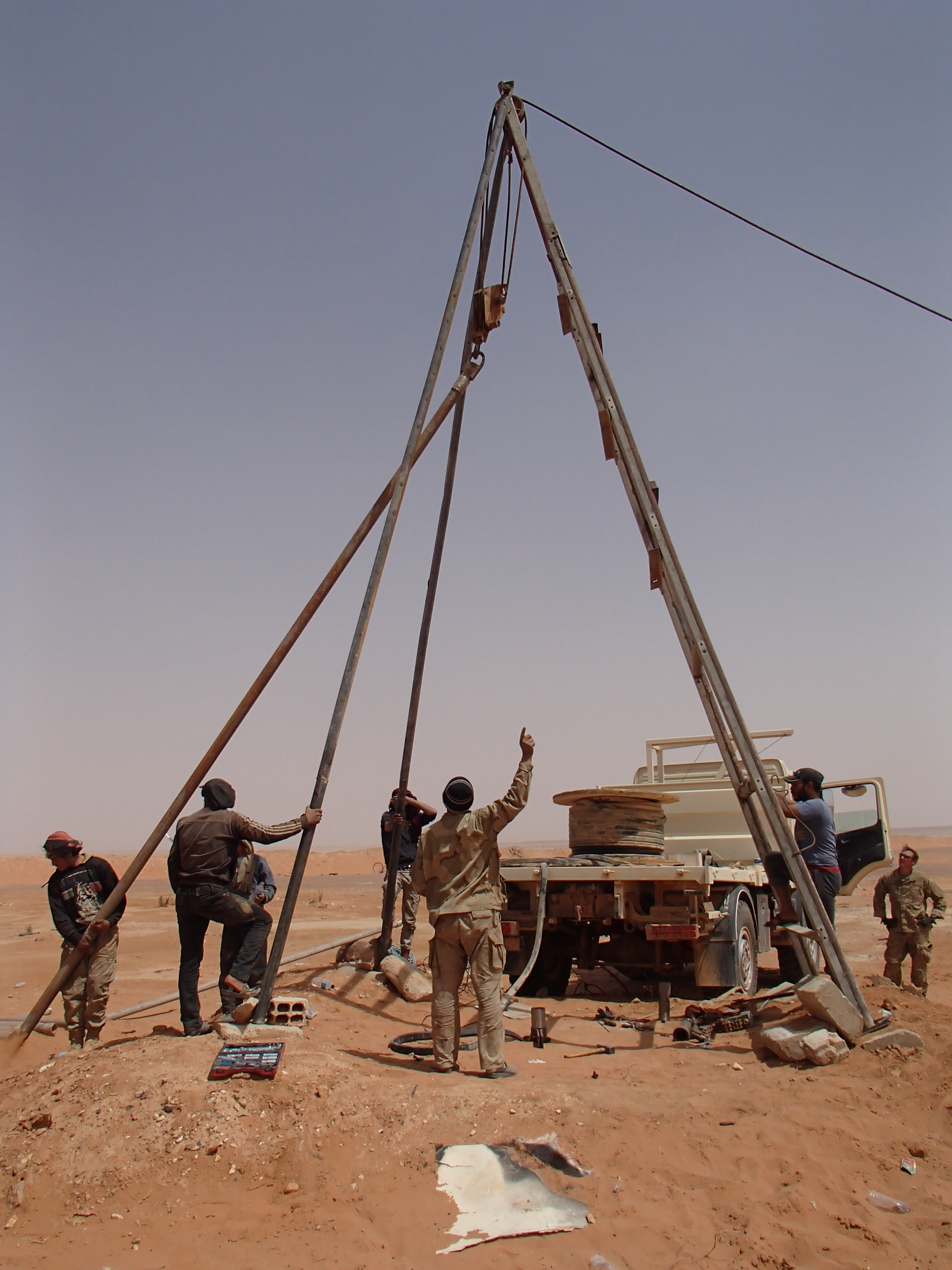
The Revolutionary Commando Army was a rebel group trained and supplied by the U.S. military in the program.

The Syrian Train and Equip Program was a United States-led military operation launched in 2014 that identified and trained the Kurdish YPG, Revolutionary Commando Army, and select other opposition groups inside Syria as well as in Turkey and other US-allied states who would then return to Syria to fight the Islamic State of Iraq and the Levant. The program reportedly cost the US$500 million. It was a covert program, run by U.S. special operations forces, separate from Timber Sycamore, the parallel covert program run by the Central Intelligence Agency (CIA). As of July 2015, only a group of 54 trained and equipped fighters (Division 30) had been reported to have been deployed, which was quickly routed by al-Nusra, and a further 75 were reported in September 2015. With the fall of the Assad regime in 2024 and the withdrawal of U.S. troops from Syria in 2026, the allied Syrian rebel forces that the United States once supported have been merged into the newly formed Syrian armed forces.

== Background ==
As the Syrian Civil War erupted in 2011, the Obama Administration considered various options for engagement. By 2013, at the direction of U.S. President Barack Obama, the Central Intelligence Agency (CIA) was put in charge of Timber Sycamore, a covert program to arm and train anti-Assad rebels, while the State Department supplied the moderate rebels of the Free Syrian Army with non-lethal aid, channeled exclusively through the opposition's Supreme Military Council; the latter was suspended in December 2013 when shipments were seized by the Islamist Islamic Front. In late 2013, the CIA program started providing training, cash, and intelligence to selected rebel commanders, and from early 2014 some weapons. In 2015, US officials said this had become one the agency's largest covert operations, with a budget approaching $1 billion a year.

On 17 September 2014, the House of Representatives voted to authorize the executive branch to train-and-equip Syrian rebels against ISIL forces. The United States was set to send 400 troops and hundreds of support staff to countries neighboring Syria to train 5,000 opposition soldiers a year for the next three years. The countries taking part in the train-and-equip program were to include Jordan, Qatar, Saudi Arabia, and Turkey. The Pentagon confirmed that it had selected 1,200 Syrian opposition members to begin training in March 2015, with 3,000 to complete training by the end of 2015. However of that number only about 200 actually began training, the majority of whom left after being required to agree to fight only against ISIL and not the Assad government.

The successful experience in Kobanî had informed U.S. policy in regards to arming Syrian opposition groups other than the Kurdish YPG, with plans to give other groups technicals equipped with radio and GPS equipment to call in airstrikes. John R. Allen, President Obama's envoy to the international coalition against ISIL, has said "It is clearly part of our plan, that not only we will train them, and we will equip them with the latest weapons systems, but we will also protect them when the time comes," alluding to aiding the opposition with air support and no fly zones. The United Kingdom announced it will send around 75 military instructors to train Syrian opposition forces. The train-and-equip program started on 9 May. On 25 May, Turkey and the U.S. agreed "in principle" on the necessity to support these forces with air support.

== Prohibition on the use of U.S. troops ==
Congressional legislation authorizing the U.S. Secretary of Defense to assist Syrian opposition forces was attached to a bill for continuing appropriations for fiscal year 2015. The bill specified that the Secretary was authorized "...to provide assistance, including training, equipment, supplies, and sustainment, to appropriately vetted elements of the Syrian opposition and other appropriately vetted Syrian groups and individuals..." The purpose of the support was to protect and defend the Syrian people, U.S. persons, and other friends and allies from ISIL and other terrorists in Syria; and to promote conditions for a negotiated settlement to end the conflict in Syria.

The congressional authorization specifically prohibited the introduction of U.S. troops or other U.S. forces into hostilities. The bill said:

"Nothing in this section shall be construed to constitute a specific statutory authorization for the introduction of United States Armed Forces into hostilities or into situations wherein hostilities are clearly indicated by the circumstances."

== Planning and training ==
As of 4 November 2014, the United States Department of Defense was preparing for the establishment of the program. Trainers were being contributed by various countries in the counter-ISIL coalition. The Obama Administration hoped to identify reliable non-Islamist Syrian rebels currently in Turkey. The Pentagon identified 7,000 potential candidates for the program. After verifying their identities and passing initial tests, the candidates were trained in tactics and advanced weapons systems by the Department of Defense. The rebels were then outfitted with American equipment, and sent back over the border to Syria. Washington hoped to train an army of 15,000 rebels to fight ISIS.

Turkey allowed about 1,000 U.S. troops involved in the training program to enter Turkey. The United Kingdom announced in March 2015 that it would send 75 military trainers to Turkey as part of the U.S.-led effort.

== Deployment ==
The first group of 154 men completed a training program in Jordan and Turkey, organized in the new Division 30 of the FSA, established specifically to fight ISIS, commanded by Colonel Nedim Hasan, a Turkmen defector from the Syrian Army, aided by the Syrian Group Captain Sahir Mustafa. The Jordanian-trained group, 100 men who had completed a 54-day program, re-entered Syria in late June 2015. The Turkish-trained group, a convoy of 54 men who had completed a 74-day program in central Anatolia, re-entered Syria on 12 July, and deployed to Azaz. However, fighters from al-Qaeda-linked Jabhat al-Nusra regarded Division 30 fighters as "American agents" and kidnapped seven Division 30 fighters on July 29, attacked its headquarters on July 31, and—despite US air support—kidnapped at least five more fighters a few days later. Al-Nusra posted photos on social media the next day showing American weapons and equipment that they had captured from the group. By September, the Pentagon acknowledged that there were only "four or five" fighters left of the Turkish-trained group of 54, with only 100–120 in the three classes then being trained.

Seventy five Syrian rebels trained by the United States and its allies to fight Islamic State had entered northern Syria since Friday, the Syrian Observatory for Human Rights said on Sunday, 20 September 2015. Rami Abdulrahman, director of the Observatory, said the rebels had crossed into Syria from Turkey with 12 vehicles equipped with machine guns. Soon afterwards however, there were reports on Twitter by al-Nusra that many of the group handed over their brand-new trucks, weapons and ammunition to the al-Nusra Front, almost immediately after crossing the border back into Syria.

== Operations ==
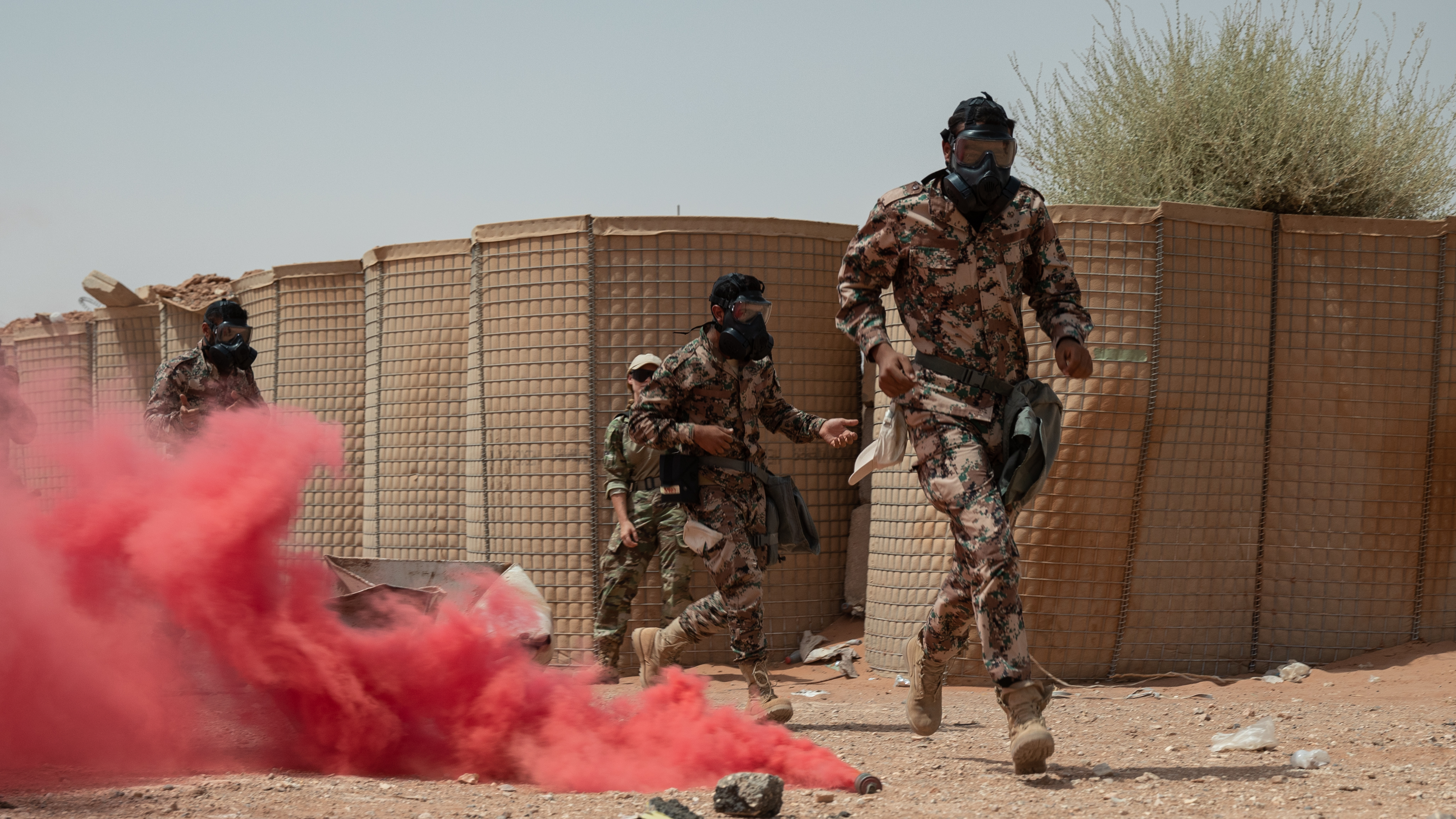
Task Force Ghost, CJTF–OIR, trains Maghaweir al-Thowra rebels in CBRN defense at al-Tanf, 6 August 2022

=== Wartime operations ===
The elimination of the first wave of U.S.-backed rebels affected recruitment of new candidates. The program has proven very controversial in Congress and faces an uncertain future. Some rebels left the program after being asked to sign an agreement pledging not to attack pro-Assad forces. However, the Washington Post's Missy Ryan and Greg Jaffe reported on Monday, 21 September 2015, that the Executive Office of the President is working on a plan to provide weapons "to a wider array of rebel groups in Syria and relaxing vetting standards, effectively deepening America's involvement in the ongoing civil war." A US official said recruiting of moderate Syrian rebels to go through training programmes in Jordan, Qatar, Saudi Arabia or the United Arab Emirates would cease, and, instead, a much smaller training centre would be set up in Turkey, where a small group of "enablers" (predominantly leaders of opposition groups) would be taught operational methods such as how to call in airstrikes. At the same time, the House Intelligence Committee voted to cut as much as 20% of the classified funds flowing into the parallel CIA programme of rebel support, with a shift of emphasis to combating ISIS in Iraq.

Also around the same time, the US revealed for the first time that Special Operations Forces were "engaged with YPG forces"—the mainly-Kurdish People's Protection Units (YPG). The next year, at the end of September 2016, the U.S. spokesman for the Combined Joint Task Force – Operation Inherent Resolve confirmed that the Syrian Democratic Forces (SDF), led by the YPG, is also part of the "vetted forces" in the train and equip program. The president of Turkey Recep Tayyip Erdoğan condemned this and claimed that the SDF are "endangering our future".

In November 2016, the main train and equip programme suffered a major setback when three American special forces trainers were killed while entering King Faisal Air Base in Jordan in a deadly attack. The Americans had been detailed to the CIA to train rebels to combat ISIS.

On 31 January 2017, the SDF received a number of armoured personnel carriers produced by ArmorGroup. U.S. military official Col. John Dorrian confirmed that the armoured vehicles were supplied by the U.S. By July 2017, more than 8,500 members of the SDF have been trained by the U.S.-led coalition and in the first half of 2017, more than 400 vehicles and other equipment have been delivered to over 40,000 SDF troops.

On 27 July 2017, the Qaryatayn Martyrs Brigade deployed forces from the al-Tanf border crossing and headed to the frontlines to fight the Syrian Armed Forces. The US-led Coalition stated that this deployment violated the agreement for U.S.-backed forces to only fight ISIL and not the Syrian government, and planned to cease support for the group.

=== Fall of the Assad Regime ===
In 2021, while fighting in Syria almost entirely subsided, four opposition groups remained part of the program, the Anti-Terror Units, the Internal Security Forces, the Provisional/Regional Internal Security Forces, and Maghawir al-Thawra.

In 2024, when major fighting in Syria began again during the Fall of the Assad regime, the opposition groups being trained through the program were the earlier-included Internal Security Forces and Provisional/Regional Internal Security Forces, the Syrian Free Army (a merger between Maghawir al-Thawra and several smaller FSA units), and several factions within the Syrian Democratic Forces, specifically the Commandos, Special Operations Team, Syrian Arab Coalition, and People's Defense Units. During the offensives which led to the collapse of the Assad regime, the Syrian Free Army led a rebel offensive from Al-Tanf into Palmyra and northern Damascus. American intelligence informed them of the regime's weakness ahead of its collapse, giving the SFA time to integrate several smaller militias into its structure and enabling another FSA unit, the Suqour al-Sham Brigade, to redeploy to the al-Tanf garrison from northern Syria in anticipation of helping the SFA offensive.

== See also ==
- Georgia Train and Equip Program
- Timber Sycamore
