= Salem Turki al-Antri =

Syrian rebel and leader of the SFA

- سالم تركي العنتري
- Born: Palmyra, Homs Governorate, Syria
- Military career
- Allegiance: Syria (2025–present); Formerly: Ba'athist Syria (until 2012); (Syrian opposition) Free Syrian Army (2017–2025)
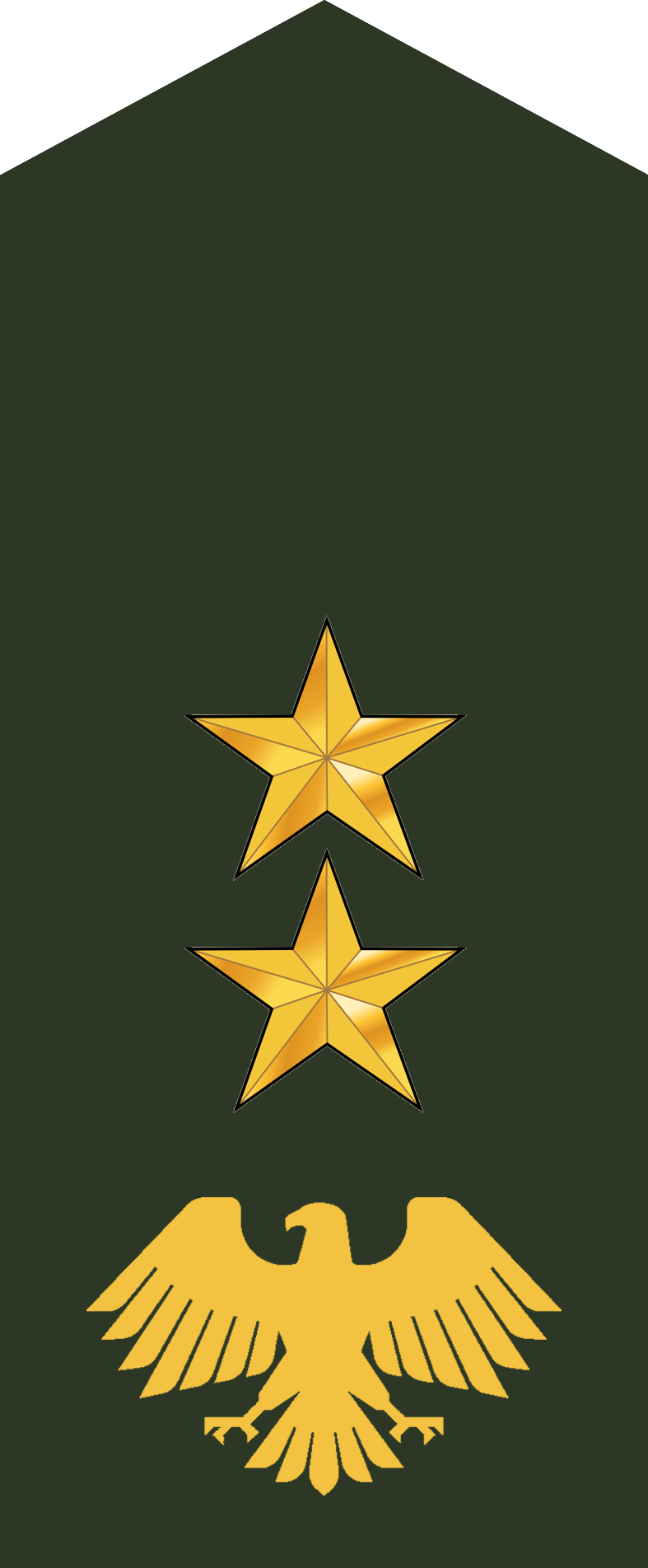
- Rank: Colonel
- Units: Unknown (???–2012, 2014–2017) (Syria) Ahrar al-Sharqiya (2017–2019) (Syria) Maghawir al-Thawra (2019–2022) (Syria) Syrian Free Army (2022–2025) (Syria) Ministry of Defense (2025–present)
- Conflicts: Syrian Civil War; Second Battle of Ras al-Ayn; 2024 Syrian opposition offensives; Palmyra offensive (2024); Fall of Damascus

Salem Turki al-Antri (Arabic: سالم تركي العنتري), is a Syrian military officer who served as the leader of the U.S.-backed Syrian Free Army (SFA) from 2022 to 2025. He joined the Free Syrian Army, serving in various FSA units, eventually being promoted to colonel and appointed to lead the SFA on 29 February 2024, replacing Muhammad Farid al-Qasim. As the leader of the SFA, he initially focused on conducting anti-ISIS operations alongside the US-led International Coalition, before playing a key role in coordinating and executing the Palmyra offensive (2024) and the fall of Damascus, which significantly expanded the area under SFA control, up to 20% of the country. On 15 September 2025, he was removed as SFA leader by U.S. forces, though the reasons for his dismissal remain unclear.

== Career ==
=== Syrian Civil War ===
He is from the "Anatara" tribe in Palmyra, a tribe linked to the "Harb" tribe, famous in the Arab Jazira. He was an artilleryman in Assad regime's forces and later joined Ahrar al-Sharqiya, a Free Syrian Army unit that operates in the Syrian National Army coalition. The source notes that al-Antri and the leaders of the group were close to the Muslim Brotherhood. As a member of Ahrar al-Sharqiya, he fought in the Battle of Ras al-Ayn, before transferring from Ahrar al-Sharqiya to Maghawir al-Thawra, a FSA unit operating in Al-Tanf. The U.S. army provided training to the FSA factions at al-Tanf to help them fight the Islamic State. Maghaweir al-Thawra changed its name to become the Syrian Free Army following mergers with other FSA units and changes to its leadership after allegations of corruption surfaced against a high-level commander in the unit. Following this, the SFA began “raising the combat level” of its soldiers in preparation for further battles with the Islamic State.

On 29 February 2024, al-Antri was appointed as commander of the SFA, succeeding Muhammad Farid al-Qasim. As commander of the SFA, al-Antri oversaw operations in the al-Tanf region, near the U.S. military al-Tanf base, a strategic area near the Syria-Iraq-Jordan border. The SFA collaborated with U.S. forces in maintaining security within the 55-kilometer deconfliction zone surrounding al-Tanf.

=== Fall of the Assad Regime ===
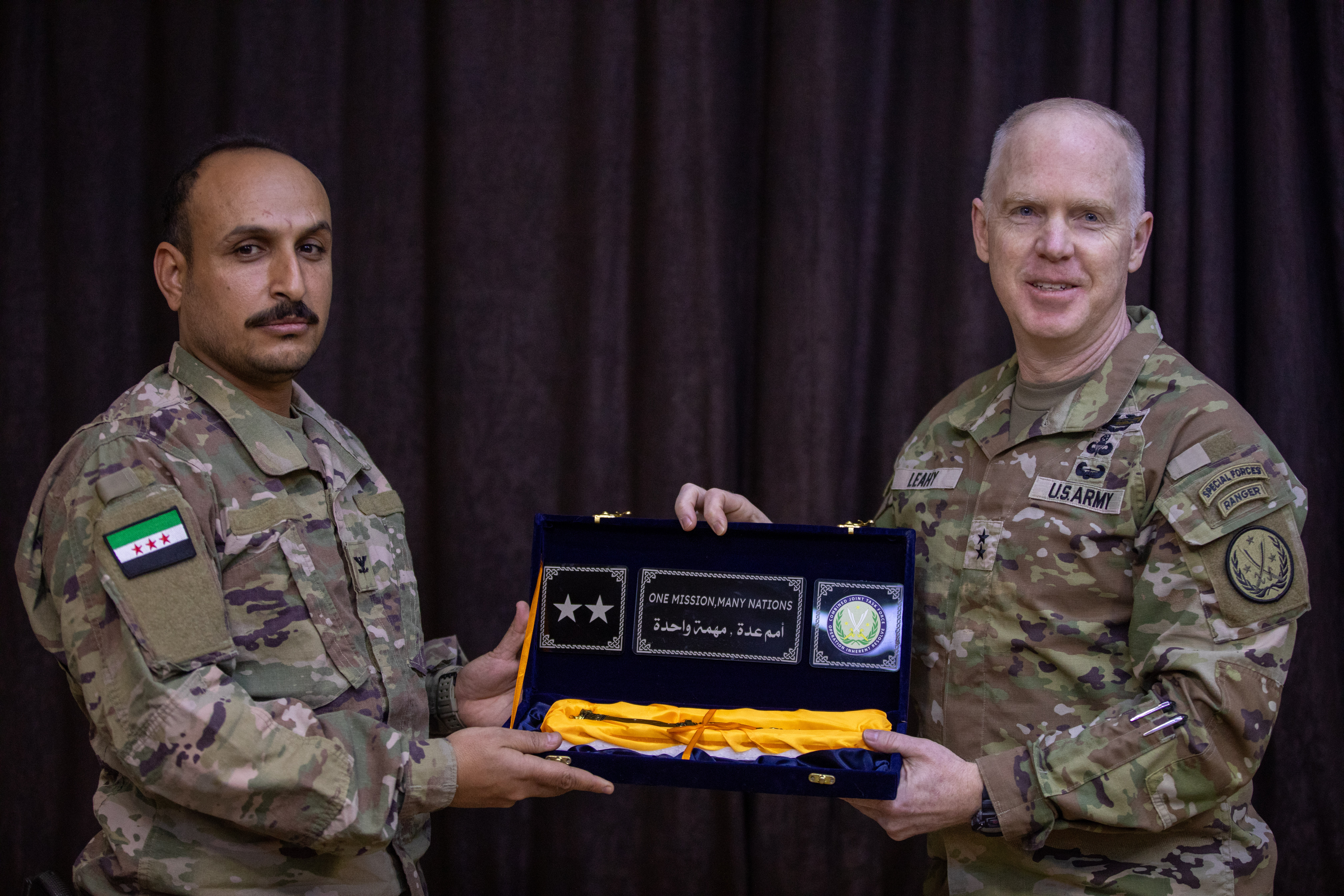
He met with Combined Joint Task Force General Kevin Leahy on 11 February 2025.

During the fall of the Assad Regime, al-Antri led the SFA units in al-Tanf in the Palmyra offensive. After defeating the Syrian government in Palmyra, the SFA, under al-Antri’s command, both assisted in the Homs offensive and routed the Syrian government to the capital Damascus, in a battle that resulted in the fall of the city to the Syrian Free Army and Hay'at Tahrir al-Sham.

He met with Syrian Minister of Defense Murhaf Abu Qasra on 9 January 2025, where they discussed the unification of rebel groups and "shared security challenges".

On 29 January 2025, he led a delegation of the Syrian Free Army to a conference declaring the victory of the Syrian Revolution, but like representatives of the Southern Operations Room, he still retained his forces and did not announce its dissolution like the pro-HTS groups.

According to the sources from al-Tanf base, al-Antri was relieved of his SFA leadership duties on 15 September 2025, while he continues to serve as an officer within the Ministry of Defense. According to one "informed" source, al-Antri's dismissal was made after US Navy admiral Brad Cooper met with Syrian President Ahmed al-Sharaa and may be related to smuggling activities near Syria's borders with Jordan and Iraq.
