= Free Syrian Army (disambiguation) =

Free Syrian Army is a coalition of resistance militias in the Syrian Civil War founded on 29 July 2011.

Free Syrian Army or Free Syria Army may also refer to:

- Syrian Free Army, also known as Maghawir al-Thawra
- Syrian National Army, also known as the Turkish-backed Free Syrian Army
