= Timber Sycamore =

CIA program that trained/supplied Syrian civil war rebels

- Seal of the CIA
- Operational scope: Weapons sales, training of Syrian rebel forces
- Location: Eastern Europe, Jordan, Syria
- Planned by: United States (CIA)
- Target: Ba'athist Syria
- Date: 2012–2017
- Executed by: United States: Central Intelligence Agency; Department of Defense; United Kingdom: MI6; Jordan: Jordanian Armed Forces; General Intelligence Department; Saudi Arabia: General Intelligence Presidency; Qatar: Qatar State Security
- Outcome: Delivery of thousands of tons of weaponry worth billions of US dollars.; Arms diverted to the Middle East black market; some may have been sold to ISIL.; Criticism of Obama administration for insufficient support to rebel groups.; US-led Syrian Train and Equip Program continues to arm, train, and support the SDF with airstrikes.

Timber Sycamore was a covert program run by the United States Central Intelligence Agency (CIA) with the aim of removing Syrian President Bashar al-Assad from power, by supplying weapons, money and training to Syrian opposition groups that fought against government forces in the Syrian Civil War. It was supported primarily by the United Kingdom, Jordan and Saudi Arabia. A significant portion of these weapons ultimately ended up in the hands of extremist groups, most notably ISIS and the Al-Nusra Front.

According to US officials, the program was run by the CIA's Special Activities Division. U.S. President Barack Obama secretly authorized the CIA to begin arming Syrian rebels in 2013. The program became public knowledge in mid-2016.

One consequence of the program was a flood of U.S.-supplied assault rifles, mortars and rocket-propelled grenades into the Middle East's black market. Critics of the program within the Obama administration viewed it as ineffective and expensive, and raised concerns about the seizure of weapons by Islamist groups, and about U.S.-backed rebels fighting alongside Al-Qaeda affiliates.

In July 2017 U.S. officials stated that Timber Sycamore would be phased out, with funds possibly redirected to fighting ISIS, or to offering rebel forces defensive capabilities.

== Creation ==
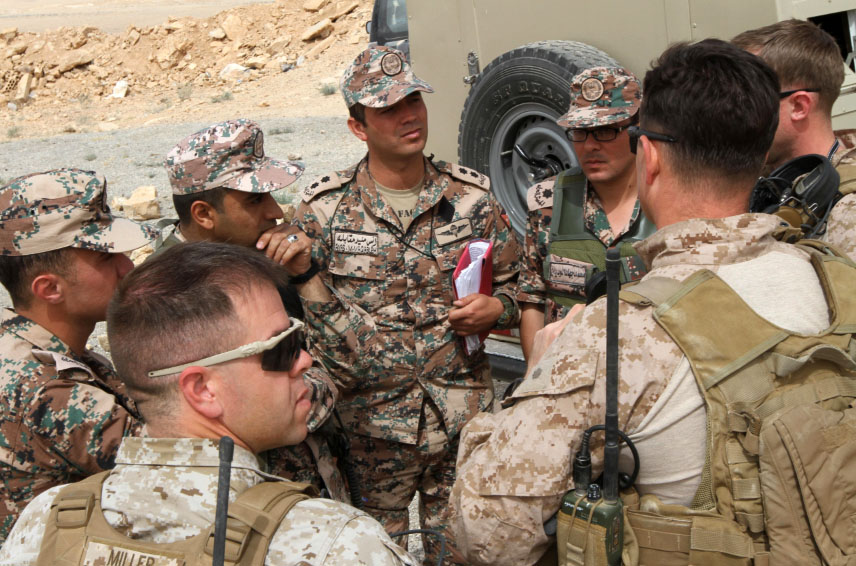
US Marines and Jordanian Army soldiers collaborate in Amman, Jordan.

CIA director David Petraeus first proposed a covert program of arming and training rebels in the summer of 2012. Initially President Barack Obama rejected the proposal, despite backing from Defense Secretary Leon Panetta, Chairman of the Joint Chiefs Martin Dempsey, and Secretary of State Hillary Clinton. White House officials claimed at the time that this rejection was due to a CIA analysis suggesting the weapons the president was comfortable sending were insufficient to change the outcome of the conflict. However, partially due to urging from U.S. allies in the region, like Jordan and Israel, as well as changes in the circumstances of the war, such as the intervention of Hezbollah and Iran, plans began in April 2013 to direct weaponry to the rebels.

Timber Sycamore began in early 2013, and was similar to other Pentagon or CIA-run weapons routing and training programs that were established in previous decades to support foreign rebel forces. On 13 June 2013, the U.S. publicly announced it would send weapons to the rebels. Greg Miller and Adam Entous of The Washington Post stated that "The operation has served as the centerpiece of the U.S. strategy to press Syrian President Bashar al-Assad to step aside." The program's principal backers were the United States and Saudi Arabia, but it was also supported by some other regional Arab governments, and by the United Kingdom. While Saudi Arabia provides more money and weaponry, the United States leads training in military equipment. The program was based in Jordan, due to that country's proximity to the battlefields in Syria.

According to The New York Times, the program initially, in 2012, allowed US forces to deliver nonlethal aid. A few months after its creation, in spring of 2013, it was amended to allow the CIA to both train and equip rebel forces. Saudi Arabia took the lead with providing military equipment, the CIA with training, and covert financing of rebel forces has also been provided by Qatar, Turkey and Jordan.

Saudi Arabia, Qatar, and Turkey shipped thousands of rifles, hundreds of machine guns, and large amounts of ammunition to Syrian rebels in 2012 before the program's launch. The CIA helped arrange some of the arms purchases for the Saudis, including a large deal in Croatia in 2012.

The existence of Timber Sycamore was revealed by The New York Times and Al Jazeera in June 2016, after Jane's Defence Weekly reported, in late 2015, that the US Federal Business Opportunities website was soliciting contracts to ship thousands of tons of weapons from Eastern Europe to Taşucu, Turkey and Aqaba, Jordan.

== Scope ==
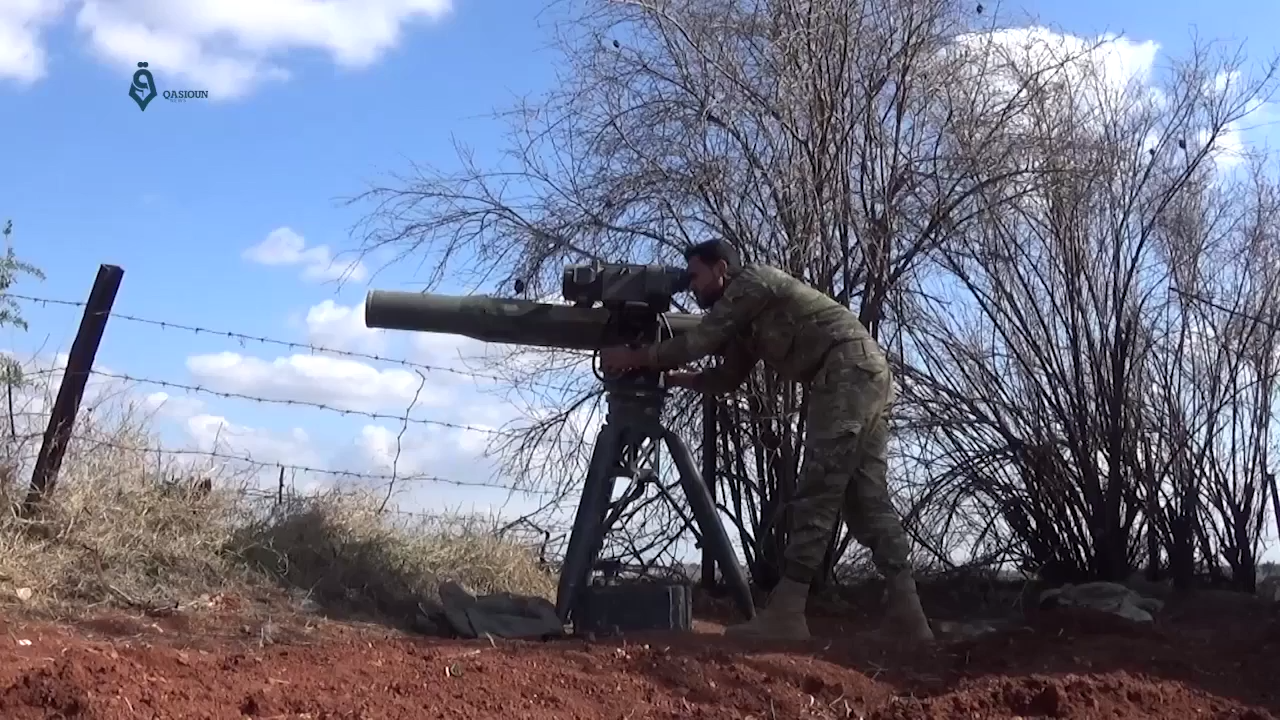
FSA fighter of the Army of Glory group launch a US-made BGM-71 TOW anti-tank missile at government forces during the 2017 Hama offensive.

Timber Sycamore was run by the Military Operations Command (MOC) in Amman and provided Kalashnikov assault rifles, mortars, rocket-propelled grenades, TOW anti-tank guided missiles, night vision goggles, pickup trucks, and other weapons to prospective Syrian rebel forces. Many of the weapons were purchased in the Balkans or other locations in Eastern Europe, and then routed to Syrian rebel forces and training camps by Jordanian security services. CIA paramilitary operatives trained Syrian rebels in use of the weaponry. According to Charles Lister at The Daily Beast there were at least 50 vetted rebel groups fighting in Syria that received weapons or training through the program after late 2012; the exact number is not known.

According to American officials, the program was highly effective, training and equipping thousands of US-backed fighters to make substantial battlefield gains. American officials stated that the program began to lose effectiveness after Russia intervened militarily in the Syrian Civil War. David Ignatius, writing in The Washington Post, remarked that while the CIA program ultimately failed in its objective of removing Assad from power, it was hardly "bootless": "The program pumped many hundreds of millions of dollars to many dozens of militia groups. One knowledgeable official estimates that the CIA-backed fighters may have killed or wounded 100,000 Syrian soldiers and their allies over the past four years."

Timber Sycamore is distinct from the Syrian Train and Equip Program, another Pentagon program established to train Syrian rebel forces to fight against the Islamic State of Iraq and the Levant (ISIL) The Pentagon made it clear their goal in Syria and Iraq was 'to fight ISIS and fight ISIS only [and] we've asked [our partner forces] to be committed to that same mission' and that they would not fight Assad's military.

US-backed rebels often fought alongside al-Qaeda's al-Nusra Front against Ba'athist forces, and some of the US-supplied weapons were seized by the al-Nusra Front. This had been a major concern within the Obama administration when the program was first proposed in 2012. There were also allegations of U.S.-backed militias carrying out summary killings of detainees. Following the Russian military intervention in Syria, pro-American militias began losing ground in late 2016, after a year of intensive aerial bombing campaigns of the Russian Air Force.

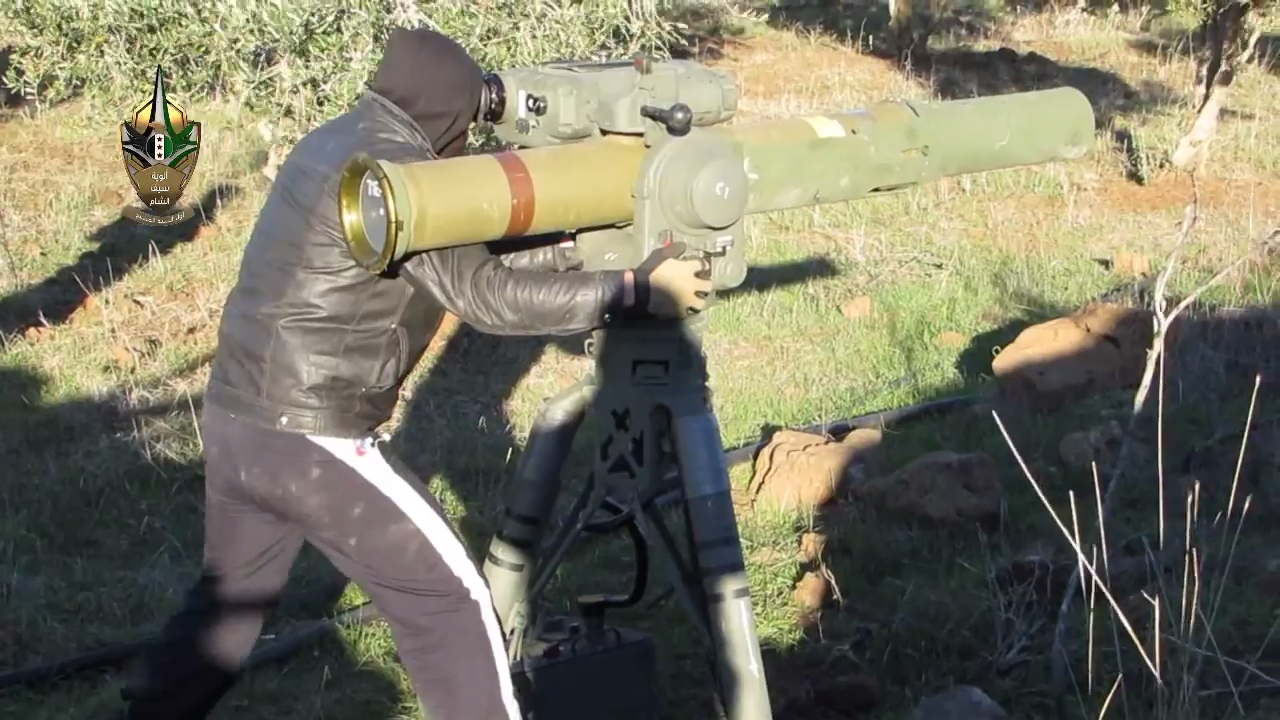
An FSA combatant of the Jesus Christ Brigade prepares to launch an American-made anti-Tank BGM-71 TOW missile

The program remains classified, and many details about the program remain unknown, including the total amount of support, the range of weapons transferred, the depth of training provided, the types of US trainers involved, and the exact rebel groups being supported. However, an opinion piece in The Canberra Times said that two thousand tons of Eastern European-manufactured weapons had been delivered to Aqaba by April 2016.

The US delivered weapons via Ramstein Air Base in Germany – possibly in breach of German laws.

== Black market ==
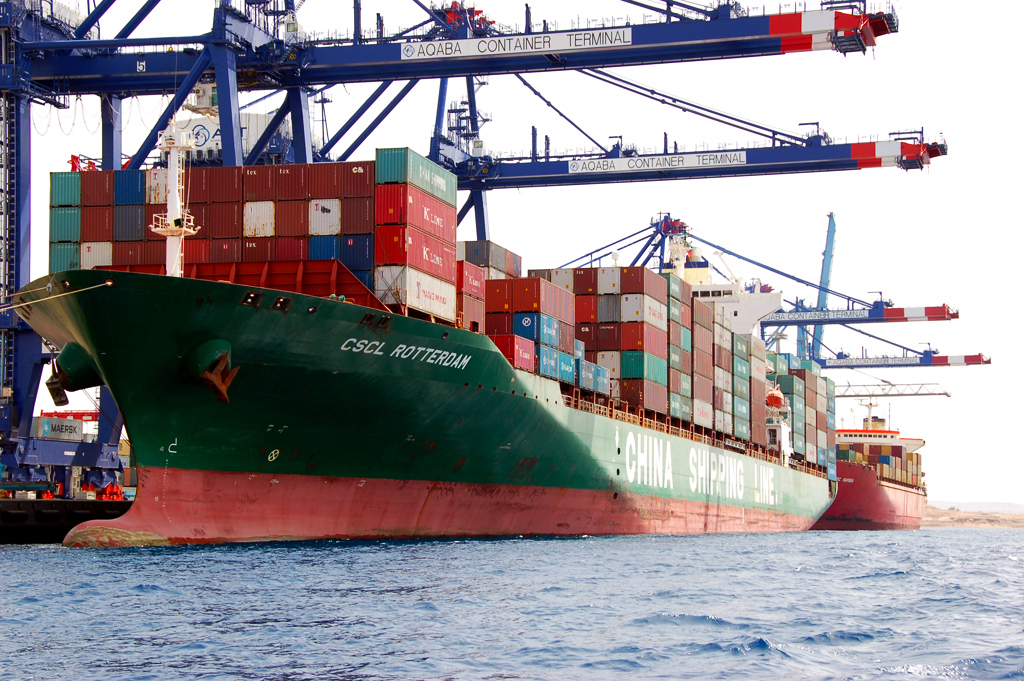
The port in Aqaba, Jordan was an important route for Timber Sycamore weaponry that entered Syria.

=== Jordanian intelligence arms sales ===
According to American and Jordanian officials, weapons shipped into Jordan by the CIA and Saudi Arabia were stolen by Jordanian intelligence officials in the General Intelligence Directorate and sold on the black market.

The magnitude of the theft amounted to millions of dollars, and FBI officials state that some of the stolen weapons were later used to kill two American contractors, two Jordanians and one South African at a police training station in Jordan in the 2015 Amman shooting attack.

The Jordanian theft and resale of the weapons — including Kalashnikov assault rifles, mortars and rocket-propelled grenades — led to a flood of weapons available on the black market. Jordanian officials state that Jordanian intelligence officers who stole the program's weapons used the profits to purchase luxury items, with knowledge of superior officers. The thefts were halted after months of complaints by the American and Saudi governments, the program's main backers. According to Jordanian officials, several intelligence officers were fired, but their profits were not confiscated. (In Jordan, the General Intelligence Directorate is second only to the monarchy in power and prestige.) Jordan's minister for state and media affairs Mohammad Al-Momani stated that the allegations were incorrect.

=== Regional weapons trafficking ===
Prior to the Syrian Civil War, southern Syria and northern Jordan were a conduit for other smuggling operations. The advent of the war transformed the region into a center for smuggling weapons, and the more formal support provided by Timber Sycamore only intensified the scale of smuggling operations on the border. Major smuggling centers include bazaars established at Ma'an in southern Jordan, Sahab in Amman, and in the Jordan River Valley.

An investigation by journalists Phil Sands and Suha Maayeh for the Abu Dhabi-based The National found that rebels supplied by western and Arab states with weapons from the Amman MOC sold a portion of them to local arms dealers, often to raise cash to pay additional fighters. Some MOC-supplied weapons were sold to Bedouin traders referred to locally as "The Birds" in Lajat, a volcanic plateau northeast of Daraa, Syria. According to rebel forces, the Bedouins would trade the weapons to the Islamic State (IS) group, who would place orders using the encrypted WhatsApp messaging service. Two rebel commanders maintained that MOC–supplied weapons have made their way to IS forces, and the United Kingdom-based Conflict Armament Research weapons monitoring organization found arms supplied by the rebels' Western and Arab backers ended up in IS hands.

Conflict Armament Research conducted a study at the behest of the European Union and Deutsche Gesellschaft für Internationale Zusammenarbeit published in 2017 which does not mention Timber Sycamore but found that external support for anti-Assad Syrian rebels "significantly augmented the quantity and quality of weapons available to [ISIL] forces," including, in the most rapid case diversion they documented, "anti-tank weapons purchased by the United States that ended up in possession of the Islamic State within two months of leaving the factory." The study traced the provenance of some weapons in detail but found no instance in which US arms supplied to the YPG–led Syrian Democratic Forces (SDF) to fight IS ended up in the arsenal of IS.

== Phasing out ==
In July 2017, anonymous officials stated that President Donald Trump, in consultation with National Security Adviser H. R. McMaster and CIA Director Mike Pompeo, had decided to phase out support for anti-Assad Syrian rebel forces, possibly redirecting resources to fighting ISIL, to offering rebel forces defensive capabilities, or to other operations in the region.

The officials said that the decision was made prior to Trump's participation in the G-20 summit and 7 July meeting with Russian president Vladimir Putin. Several officials characterized the decision as a "major concession" to Russia, with one remarking: "Putin won in Syria." However, another official stated that ending the program was not a major concession due to Assad's recent victories in the Syrian Civil War, but rather "a signal to Putin that the administration wants to improve ties to Russia." Some members of the Obama administration reportedly had wished to scrap the program because some rebels armed and trained by the program had joined ISIL and related groups.

A related US military program to arm, train, and support the SDF fighting ISIL with airstrikes continued in 2017 and also through the years 2018–2021 until US troops withdrawal from Syria in 2026.

== Commentary ==
=== Press ===
In Il Giornale, Fausto Biloslavo wrote that, despite the program's secrecy, US Vice President Joe Biden was photographed at the center of Zarqa in March 2015.

In April 2014, Seymour Hersh wrote an essay published in the London Review of Books which does not mention Timber Sycamore but which describes an anonymous former senior US intelligence official's claims that the U.S. diplomatic post in Libya's Benghazi "had no real political role" and existed solely to provide cover for a secret arms pipeline supporting Syrian rebels fighting in the Syrian Civil War in early 2012. According to Hersh's source, the "rat line" was a means for channeling military weapons from Gaddafi's arsenals into Syria and into the hands of Syrian rebels. According to Hersh, an agreement in early 2012 between Obama and Erdoğan proposed an operation funded by Turkey, Saudi Arabia and Qatar, and conducted by the CIA in collaboration with MI6, although a spokesperson for then CIA director David Petraeus said the operation never happened.

=== Politicians ===
In 2016, US Senator Ron Wyden's office questioned the program, releasing a statement that "the US is trying to build up the battlefield capabilities of the anti-Assad opposition, but they haven't provided the public with details about how this is being done, which US agencies are involved, or which foreign partners those agencies are working with."

=== Analysts ===
Thomas Joscelyn of The Weekly Standard supported the Trump administration's decision to cancel the program, stating "there is no evidence that any truly moderate force is effectively fighting Assad." In December 2017, Max Abrahms of the Council on Foreign Relations and John Glaser of the Cato Institute observed in the Los Angeles Times that "[ISIL] imploded right after external support for the 'moderate' rebels dried up," which is consistent with studies demonstrating that "external support for the opposition tends to exacerbate and extend civil wars, which usually peter out not through power-sharing agreements among fighting equals, but when one side—typically, the incumbent—achieves dominance." Political scientist Federico Manfredi Firmian called Timber Sycamore “one of the United States’ most ill-conceived and deadly covert-action programs,” noting that it failed to unseat Assad, fueled the war, and inflicted untold misery on the Syrian people. Jeffrey Sachs and Bob Dreyfuss said that the Obama administration's aim in the Timber Sycamore program was to overthrow the government of Bashar al-Assad.

Charles Lister, a senior fellow at the Middle East Institute, criticized the Obama administration for not providing adequate funding and "necessary resources" to FSA units. He said that this indecision resulted in the program's failure to decisively shift the strategic dynamics of the war in favor of the Free Syrian Army. According to Lister, the Timber Sycamore program was "drip-feeding opposition groups just enough to survive but never enough to become dominant actors".

=== Columnists ===
In 2016, Canadian right-wing political commentator Rachel Marsden, in a column in The Baltimore Sun, provided her interpretation of the New York Times reporting on Timber Sycamore. She suggested that the Timber Sycamore program involved the arming and funding of independent military contractors by the Saudi intelligence, along with the CIA's training of pro-American militias in Syria, and that these operations aimed at overthrowing the Assad government, installing a new Syrian government friendly to U.S., Saudi and Qatari interests, and weaken Russia's influence in the Middle East. In 2016, Australian columnist Paul Malone wrote in the Sydney Morning Herald that weapons delivered to various Free Syrian militias might have been captured by the Al-Nusra Front, outlining a parallel with the seizure of American weaponry by the Islamic State organization after its capture of Mosul in 2014.

== See also ==
- American-led intervention in the Syrian Civil War
- Operation Cyclone, 1979–1992 CIA program to arm and finance Afghan insurgents fighting the Soviet-backed government and Soviet forces in Afghanistan.
- Iran–Contra affair, US arms sales to Iran to support Contras.
- Safari Club, anti-communist Middle East clandestine operations group during the Cold War.
- Foreign interventions by the United States
- United States involvement in regime change
- 2015 Amman shooting attack
- King Faisal Air Base shooting
- Stop Arming Terrorists Act
- Collaboration with ISIL
