= Palmyra offensive (2024) =

SFA-led offensive in east Homs Governorate

- Part of the 2024 Syrian opposition offensives during the Syrian civil war
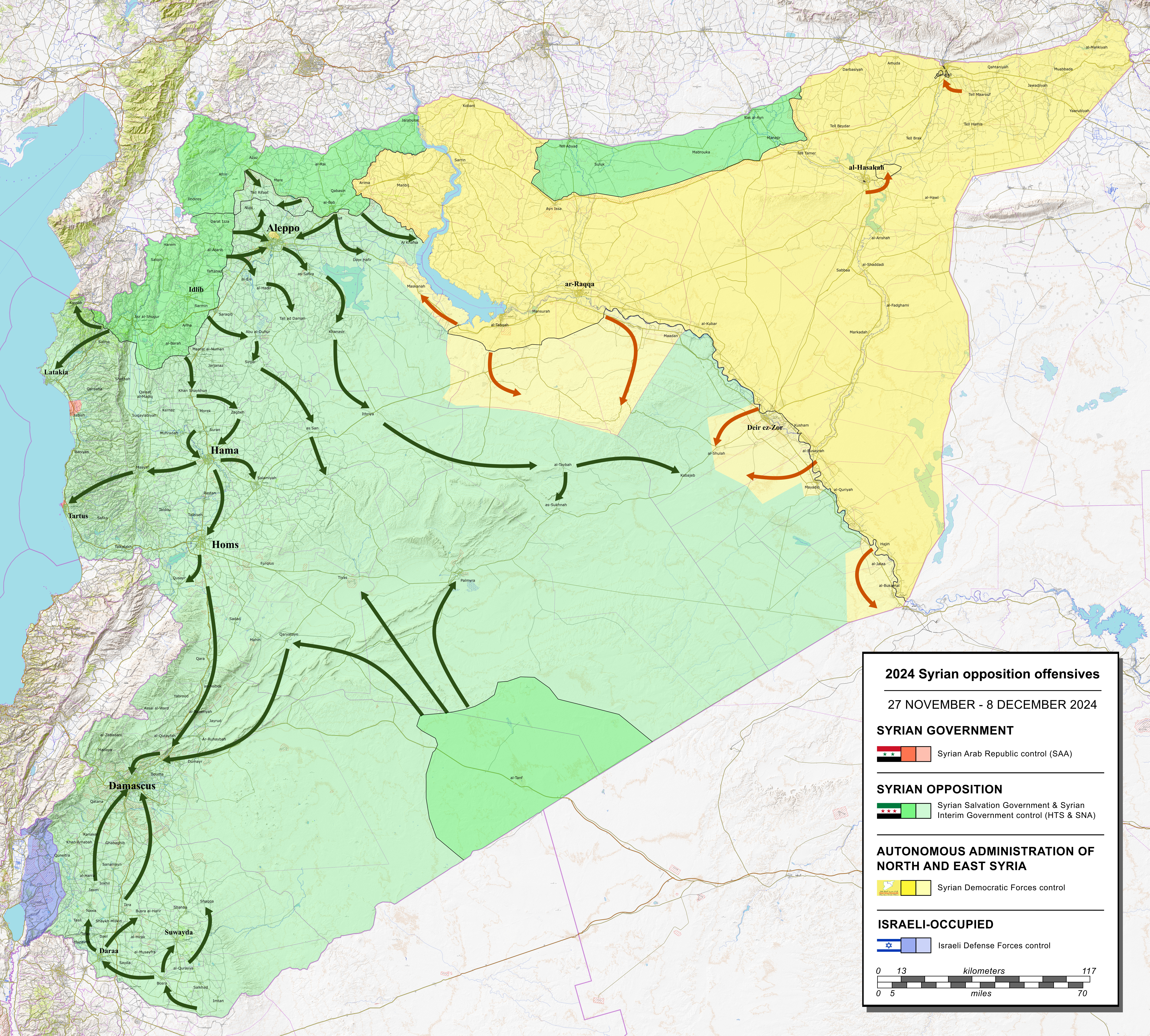
- Map of Palmyra; Controlled by the Syrian Arab Republic; Controlled by the Syrian Free Army
Date	6–7 December 2024 (1 day)
Location	Eastern Homs Governorate, Syria
Result	Syrian opposition victory
Territorial changes	Syrian opposition forces capture Palmyra; Significant advances by opposition forces

Belligerents
Syrian opposition	(Ba'athist Syria) Syrian government (surrendered); Hezbollah

Commanders and leaders
Salem Turki al-Antri; Abdulrazzaq Abu Khatib	Unknown

Units involved
(Syrian opposition) Syrian Free Army; (Syrian opposition) Suqour al-Sham Brigades	Syrian Armed Forces; Syrian Arab Army

On 6 December 2024, the United States–backed Syrian Free Army, with support from Suqour al-Sham, launched an offensive from the Al-Tanf "deconfliction zone" on the ancient city of Palmyra in the eastern area of the Homs Governorate. The United States reportedly gave logistical support to the opposition groups. The offensive came following setbacks by the government of Bashar al-Assad on other fronts, especially after the northwestern offensive by Tahrir al-Sham.

The Syrian Free Army (SFA) took control of Palmyra on 7 December after clashing with regime forces before going in the direction of Damascus.

== Background ==
The SFA was told by the US Special Forces based at Al-Tanf to prepare for a coming offensive. The SFA's ranks were bolstered in October 2024 by various units that had expanded the group from 800 to around 3,000 fighters, including a unit that had been trained in Jordan by British forces to hunt down members of ISIS.

The Syrian Arab Army withdrew from the nearby Tiyas Air Base.

== Offensive ==
The offensive was led by Abdulrazzaq Abu Khatib of Suqour al-Sham, whose group, in addition to Hezbollah, took the most casualties of the battle.

Al-Antri faced his former "tank unit" during the battle and told his men to fire warning shots.

== Aftermath ==
The groups captured Damascus the following day.

As of mid-December, ISIS fighters were still on the outskirts of the city. Abu Khatib anticipated an offensive to start in January to flush them out.

The SFA has established checkpoints between Palmyra and Al-Tanf, though the group is dealing with a large increase in the amount of area it controls.

== See also ==
- 2024 Syrian opposition offensives
  - Northwestern Syria offensive (2024)
  - Deir ez-Zor offensive (2024)
  - Southern Syria offensive (2024)
