= Division 30 =

Syrian rebel group formed by the United States

30th Infantry Division
- Arabic: الفرقة 30 مشاة
- Logo of the Division 30, which is identical to the logo of the New Syrian Army
- Leaders: Lt. Col. Mohammad al-Dhaher; Capt. Ammar al-Wawi; Col. Nadim al-Hassam (POW); Anas Ibrahim Obaid
- Dates active: May—November 2015 (largely defunct)
- Headquarters: Maryamin, Afrin and Mare', Aleppo Governorate
- Active regions: Aleppo Governorate
- Size: >75 (July—September 2015); 4–5 (after September 2015)
- Part of: (Syrian opposition) Free Syrian Army: Army of Revolutionaries (remnants of second units)
- Wars: Syrian Civil War

The 30th Infantry Division (Arabic: الفرقة 30 مشاة), commonly referred to as Division 30, also called the New Syrian Forces, was a Syrian rebel group formed by the United States. It was formed in mid-2015 during the Syrian Civil War with a specified purpose of fighting the Islamic State of Iraq and the Levant in northwestern Syria.

== History ==
=== First units ===
Before the training program started, about 400 Syrian rebel fighters travelled to the border with Turkey hoping to join the program. Many of them failed to join the program. On May 7, 2015, US Defense Secretary Ashton Carter said that nearly 90 fighters had begun their training, and a second group would begin training in the next few weeks. The vetted fighters were being trained to fight the ISIL rather than the Syrian Armed Forces. Turkey, Saudi Arabia, Qatar and Jordan opened training sites for the program.

On July 12, 2015, 54 fighters from the first graduates of the program, commanded by an ethnic Syrian Turkmen colonel who had defected from the Syrian army, crossed from Turkey to Syria in a convoy of 30 pickup trucks, according to Turkish news media. They would be able to call in US airstrikes against ISIL. Each fighter that graduated was given an M-16 rifle, $400 US dollars, and 400 Turkish liras. On July 28, 2015, leader Nadim al-Hassan and an unspecified number of companions were allegedly abducted by members of the al-Nusra Front while returning from a meeting in Azaz. In a public statement, the group called for their release.

In August 2015, the first group of Division 30 rebels set up a headquarters in Syria, which was attacked and captured by the al-Nusra front, the al-Qaeda affiliate in Syria who kidnapped a number of their members. Later on, following the al-Nusra attack, Assad government warplanes bombed the headquarters causing most remaining members to flee to join other rebel groups.

According to Syrian sources, the 75 fighters newly trained in a camp near the Turkish capital crossed through the Bab al-Salama border crossing and entered the Aleppo Governorate, heading to the town of Tell Rifaat, while others went to support the Mountain Hawks Brigade. The group entered in a convoy of a dozen cars with light weapons and ammunition, under air cover from the US-led coalition.

=== Second units ===
In September 2015, a second group of Division 30 rebels, consisting of 75 fighters with 12 Toyota pick-up trucks, medium machine guns and ammunition crossed the Syrian-Turkish border and was stopped and captured by the Levant Front. They ended up giving up much of their weaponry and ammunition to the al-Nusra Front in order to secure passage farther into Syria.

By the end of September 2015, General Lloyd Austin, head of US Central Command, said the remaining members of Division 30 were limited in number, "We're talking four or five". Division 30's current whereabouts are unknown after they allegedly stopped receiving funding and supplies from the U.S.

On 17 November 2015, several members of Division 30 appeared in the announcement video of the Syrian Democratic Forces in the Aleppo and northern Idlib governorates alongside other members of the Army of Revolutionaries and the YPG. However, the Division 30 leadership denied the group as a whole joining the SDF.

In December 2015, some fighters from the "New Syrian Forces" based in Mare' and trained by the US have joined the al-Mu'tasim Brigade, another FSA group in northern Aleppo trained and equipped by the US Department of Defense.

In May 2016, al-Nusra Front released a statement claiming that they have released 7 Division 30 fighters while the commander and the rest of the group are still in custody.

== See also ==
- New Syrian Army
