= Stop Arming Terrorists Act =

Proposed U.S. Act of Congress

Legislative history
- Introduced in the House of Representatives as H.R. 608 by Tulsi Gabbard (D–HI-2) on January 23, 2017

Stop Arming Terrorists Act

Legislative history
- Introduced in the Senate as S. 532 by Rand Paul (R–KY) on March 6, 2017

The Stop Arming Terrorists Act is a proposed Act of Congress that was originally sponsored by United States Representative for Hawaii's 2nd congressional district Tulsi Gabbard and United States Senator for Kentucky Rand Paul in early 2017 to prohibit the use of United States Government funds to provide assistance to Al Qaeda, Jabhat Fateh al-Sham, and the Islamic State of Iraq and the Levant (ISIL) and to countries supporting those organizations, and for other purposes.

As of November 2017, 14 other lawmakers out of 435 United States House of Representatives have co-sponsored Gabbard's House bill. Paul's Senate version of the bill, on the other hand, has zero cosponsors.

On December 20, 2019, the Senate passed S. 1790, the National Defense Authorization Act for Fiscal Year 2020 became law with § 1228 stating:

PROHIBITION ON PROVISION OF WEAPONS AND OTHER FORMS OF SUPPORT TO CERTAIN ORGANIZATIONS. None of the funds authorized to be appropriated by this Act or otherwise made available for the Department of Defense for fiscal year 2020 may be used to knowingly provide weapons or any other form of support to Al Qaeda, the Islamic State of Iraq and Syria (ISIS), Jabhat Fateh al Sham, Hamas, Hizballah, Palestine Islamic Jihad, al-Shabaab, Islamic Revolutionary Guard Corps, or any individual or group affiliated with any such organization.

== H.R.608 - Stop Arming Terrorists Act ==
On January 23, 2017, Tulsi Gabbard sponsored the House version of the bill: "To prohibit the use of United States Government funds to provide assistance to Al Qaeda, Jabhat Fateh al-Sham, and the Islamic State of Iraq and the Levant (ISIL) and to countries supporting those organizations, and for other purposes." There were six original co-sponsors including North Carolina Republican Walter B. Jones Jr. and Virginia Republican and Army veteran Thomas Garrett. Six days prior, Gabbard had tweeted: "The practice of spending taxpayer dollars to fund counterproductive regime change wars must end. It is long overdue we pass the Stop Arming Terrorists Act to prevent terrorist groups like al-Qaeda or state sponsors like Saudi Arabia from receiving cash, weapons, or intelligence."

=== Cosponsors ===
Cosponsor	Original Cosponsor	Date Cosponsored
Rep. Peter Welch [D-VT-At Large]	Yes	January 23, 2017
Rep. Thomas Massie [R-KY-4]	Yes	January 23, 2017
Rep. Barbara Lee [D-CA-13]	Yes	January 23, 2017
Rep. Walter B. Jones Jr. [R-NC-3]	Yes	January 23, 2017
Rep. Thomas Garrett Jr. [R-VA-5]	Yes	January 23, 2017
Rep. Ted Yoho [R-FL-3]	Yes	January 23, 2017
Rep. Paul Gosar [R-AZ-4]	No	February 7, 2017
Rep. Scott Perry [R-PA-4]	No	February 28, 2017
Rep. John Conyers Jr. [D-MI-13]	No	March 6, 2017
Rep. Dana Rohrabacher [R-CA-48]	No	March 29, 2017
Rep. Ro Khanna [D-CA-17]	No	April 26, 2017
Rep. Bobby Rush [D-IL-1]	No	April 27, 2017
Rep. Jeff Duncan [R-SC-3]	No	May 22, 2017
Rep. Peter DeFazio [D-OR-4]	No	June 22, 2017

== S.532 - Stop Arming Terrorists Act ==
On March 6, 2017, Rand Paul introduced the Senate version of the bill. It did not gather any co-sponsors.

== Incorporation into the National Defense Authorization Act for Fiscal Year 2020 ==
On June 13, 2019, Gabbard secured inclusion of a provision into the 2020 National Defense Authorization Act (NDAA) "to prohibit the use of taxpayer funds to provide weapons or any form of support to al-Qaeda, the Islamic State of Iraq and Syria, Jabhat Fateh al Sham, any individual or group associated with these organizations, or any entity the Secretary of Defense determines may trade or sell arms to terrorist organizations." Gabbard commented: “Unfortunately, in their dogged pursuit of regime change war, leaders in Washington have used taxpayer dollars to fund programs that directly and indirectly support terrorist groups like al-Qaeda in places like Syria. This continues in Yemen where US-support for Saudi Arabia’s genocidal war in Yemen has resulted in the Saudis delivering US-weapons to terrorist groups like al-Qaeda, as reported by CNN earlier this year. This is not only wrong, it’s illegal for any American to provide money or assistance to terrorist groups like these. The provision I passed today would make these same rules apply to the U.S. government.”

== Gottheimer amendment ==
On July 11, 2019, Josh Gottheimer (D-NJ-5) offered an amendment to add ‘‘Hamas, Hizballah, Palestine Islamic Jihad, al-Shabaab, Islamic Revolutionary Guard Corps’’ after ‘‘al Sham,’’.

== Senate passage of the National Defense Authorization Act for Fiscal Year 2020 ==
On December 20, 2019, S. 1790 became law with § 1228 stating:

PROHIBITION ON PROVISION OF WEAPONS AND OTHER FORMS OF SUPPORT TO CERTAIN ORGANIZATIONS. None of the funds authorized to be appropriated by this Act or otherwise made available for the Department of Defense for fiscal year 2020 may be used to knowingly provide weapons or any other form of support to Al Qaeda, the Islamic State of Iraq and Syria (ISIS), Jabhat Fateh al Sham, Hamas, Hizballah, Palestine Islamic Jihad, al-Shabaab, Islamic Revolutionary Guard Corps, or any individual or group affiliated with any such organization.

== See also ==
- Military-Industrial Complex
- Terrorism financing
- Terrorism
- Justice Against Sponsors of Terrorism Act
- Timber Sycamore
- CIA activities in Syria
