= 2015 Amman shooting attack =

Workplace shooting

Amman shooting attack
- Location: Al-Muwaqqar, Amman, Jordan
- Date: November 9, 2015
- Attack type: Mass shooting, workplace violence
- Weapon: AK-47
- Deaths: 6 (including the perpetrator)
- Injuries: 5
- Perpetrator: Officer Anwar Abu Ubayd †
- Motive: Financial and psychological problems

On 9 November 2015, a Jordanian police officer opened fire on a police training center staff during their lunch break at the cafeteria in Al-Muwaqqar, Amman, Jordan, killing four, including two Americans, a South African, and a Jordanian. Six others were injured, including three Americans, a Lebanese, and two Jordanians, one of whom later died. The gunman was then killed by a fellow Jordanian officer.

The attack took place on the tenth anniversary of Al-Qaeda in Iraq's 2005 Amman bombings.

Investigations done by Jordanian officials found that the motive of the mass shooting was "financial and psychological problems of the perpetrator". The mass shooting is an uncommon event in the secure country.

== Attack ==
The attack was on personnel at the United States funded Jordan International Police Training Centre (JIPTC), a facility that principally trains Palestinian and Iraqi police officers. The facility is located in the Al-Muwaqqar district of the Amman Governorate, and is staffed by contractors from the United States and other countries. On the same day, King Abdullah of Jordan paid a visit to the wounded lying in the King Hussein Medical Center.

According to Jordanian Minister of the Interior Salameh Hammad, the investigation concluded that Abu Ubayd acted alone.

== Victims ==
Two Jordanians, one South African, and two U.S. nationals were killed in the attack. The wounded included a Lebanese police lieutenant, two U.S. contractors, and three Jordanian police officers.

The two Jordanian translators who were killed were Kamal Malkawi and Awni Aqrabawi. The Americans were James "Damon" Creach (42), from New Tampa, Florida, and Lloyd "Carl" Fields Jr. of Cape Coral, Florida. They were employed by DynCorp International. The program they were working on is funded by the State Department's Bureau of Diplomatic Security and Bureau of International Narcotics and Law Enforcement.

== Perpetrator ==
The gunman was identified as 28-year-old police officer Anwar Mohammed Salama al-Saad Abu Zaid Bani Abdu, while Al-Rai newspaper, the government's official outlet, named the assailant as officer Anwar Abu Ubayd. The perpetrator was with the Jordanian criminal investigation department before he was transferred to the police training academy.

== Source of weapons ==
The weapons were stolen from the CIA's Timber Sycamore program.

== Possible motive ==
On 14 November, the Jordanian government held a press conference to discuss the shooting. According to Minister of Interior Affairs Salameh Hammad, the officer was declared a lone wolf, and the motives of the officer were not related to any terrorist organizations but rather to the "financial and psychological problems of the perpetrator".

== See also ==
- King Faisal Air Base shooting
- Jordanian intervention in the Syrian civil war
