= 54th Division (Syria) =

Military unit of the Syrian Army

- Active: March 2025 – present
- Country: Syria
- Branch: Syrian Army
- Area of responsibility: Hama Governorate; Homs Governorate; Rif Dimashq Governorate: Al-Tanf
- Engagements: Aftermath of the Syrian civil war; Western Syria clashes; Druze insurgency in Southern Syria (2025–present)

Commanders
- Current commander: Vacant

The 54th Division is a military division within the Syrian Army. Established in March 2025, the division primarily operates in Hama Governorate, Homs Governorate and Rif Dimashq Governorate. The 54th Division's personnel originates from Ahrar al-Sham, a former member group of the National Front for Liberation.

== History ==
=== Composition ===
The members of the 54th Division come from the rebel group, Ahrar al-Sham, the division operates in Homs Governorate, with former members of National Front for Liberation.

=== Clashes in Western Syria ===
The 54th Division operated in Tartus and Homs, after the Western Syria clashes.

=== Clashes in Suwayda ===
The 54th Division participated in the clashes in July between the Syrian government and the Druze militias in Suwayda, on 16 July, military convoys of the 54th Division on the Damascus-Daraa highway were attacked by Israeli aircraft, who were heading to Suwayda.

=== Deployment in al-Tanf ===
Following the withdrawal of US forces from al-Tanf, the 54th Division entered the base, establishing a control network as part of a security plan.

== Structure ==
As of 3 March 2026, the commander position in the 54th Division is currently vacant after the death of Hussein Abdullah Al-Ubayd, the division's former commander, whom had also served as a former military commander in Ahrar al-Sham. Other high-ranking members include Abd al-Ilahi Ali al-Hasani and Bashar Obeid Kutaybah.

The Division controls six subordinate brigades:

- 2nd Brigade
- 555th Brigade (led by Abu Ibrahim)
- Special Forces Brigade
