= 2021 Al-Tanf drone attack =

Attack on a US army base in Syria

- Part of 2019–2021 Persian Gulf crisis and the Syrian civil war
- Location: Al-Tanf base, Rif Dimashq Governorate, Syria; 33°30′21″N 38°37′04″E
- Target: Combined Joint Task Force – Operation Inherent Resolve; Maghaweir al-Thowra
- Date: 20 October 2021 (UTC+2 (EET))
- Executed by: (Iran) Army of the Guardians of the Islamic Revolution (alleged)

On 20 October 2021, multiple projectiles struck the Al-Tanf base in Syrian opposition controlled territory, where members of the U.S. military-led CJTF-OIR were training a Free Syrian Army unit known as Maghaweir al-Thowra. Although no injuries were sustained, the attack was unusually heavy—seemingly a mix of drone and rocket systems, with as many as five munitions used. Both the FSA areas and CJTF-OIR areas of the base were attacked. The coalition confirmed that the attack involved “a UAS [i.e., drone] attack coupled with IDF," referring to "Indirect Fire using Rockets."

The attack on this US garrison may have been in response to Israeli activities, according to The New York Times. Pentagon officials said Iran was behind the attacks.
