= Al-Tanf =

Military base in the Syrian desert

- التَّنْف
- Douma, Rif Dimashq, Syria
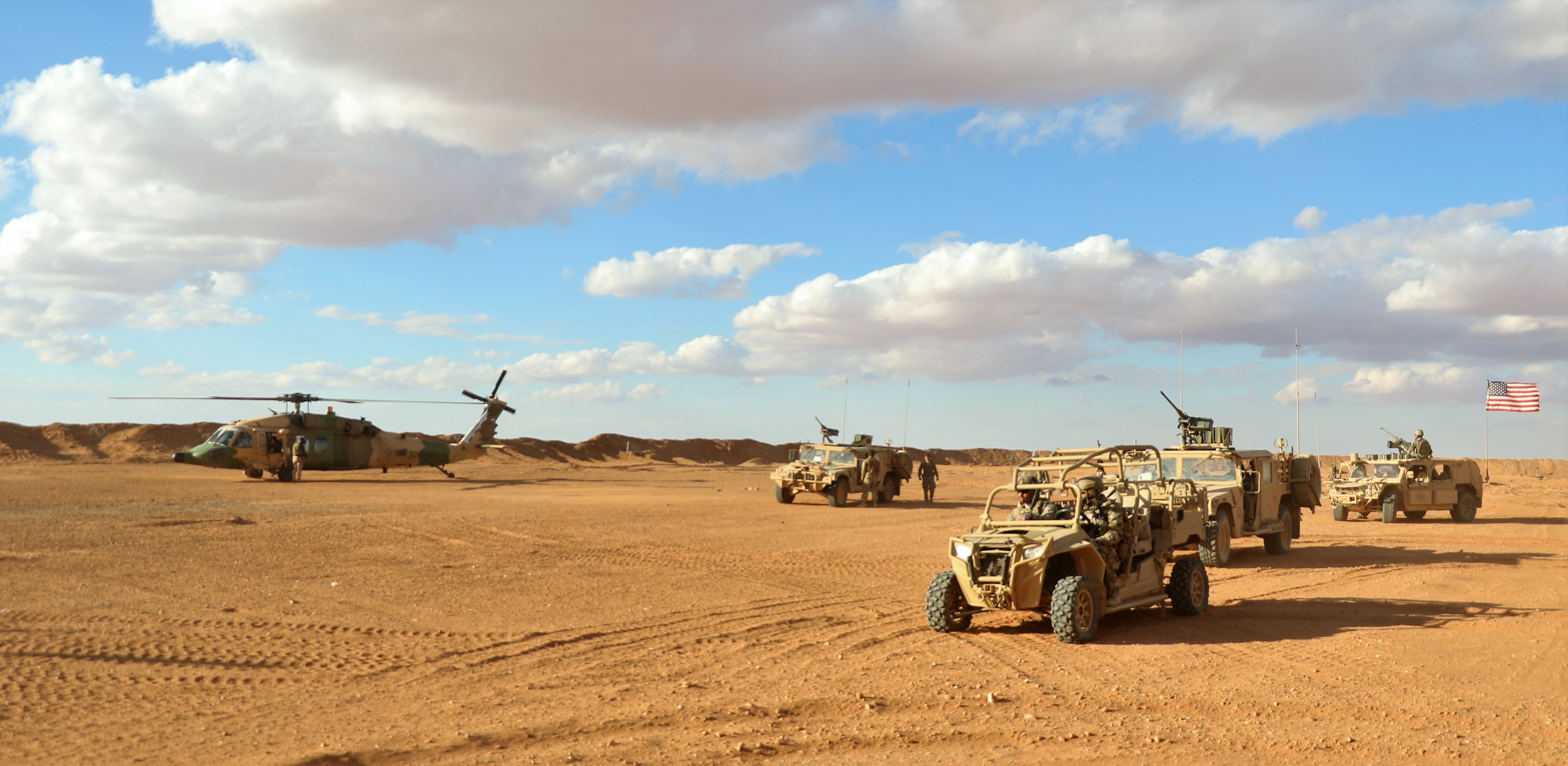
- A UH-60 of the RJAF joins up with 5th SFG (A) operators in a landing zone at Al-Tanf, November 2017

Site information
- Type: Military base
- Controlled by: Syria (since 2026) (United States) U.S. troops (2016–2026) (Syrian opposition) Syrian Free Army (2016–2025)

Location
- Location of Al-Tanf, Syria
- Coordinates: 33°30′21″N 38°37′04″E

Site history
- Built: 3 March 2016
- In use: 2016–present
- Battles/wars: Syrian Civil War

Garrison information
- Garrison: Ministry of Defense: Syrian Armed Forces; Syrian Army; 54th Division; Ministry of Interior: Desert Security Forces

Al-Tanf (Arabic: التَّنْف) is a military base in a part of the Rif Dimashq Governorate, Syria, which is used by the Syrian Armed Forces. It is located 24 km (15 mi) west of the al-Walid border crossing in the Syrian Desert. The garrison is located along a critical road known as the Route 2 Baghdad–Damascus Highway. The surrounding deconfliction zone was located along the Iraq–Syria border and the Jordan–Syria border. The Rukban refugee camp for internally displaced Syrians was located within the deconfliction zone.

A significant United States Armed Forces and allied European presence at the outpost began in early 2016 during the American-led intervention in the Syrian civil war in order to train anti-Islamic State fighters of the New Syrian Army armed opposition group, which was dissolved and reemerged as the Revolutionary Commando Army in December 2016. It has served as the headquarters of the Syrian Free Army until June 2025, and then of the 70th Division of the post-Assad Syrian Army, and eventually of the Syrian Desert Security Forces since October 2025. During the civil war, the area was subjected to a number of attacks by Islamic State, Ba'athist Syrian, pro-Iranian, and Russian forces, notably the Tower 22 drone attack on the Jordanian side of the border. The remaining American military personnel departed to Jordan on 11 February 2026.

== History ==
=== Establishment ===
In May 2015, Islamic State (IS, also known as ISIS) militants captured the border checkpoint at Al-Tanf, thus obtaining control over the full length of the Iraq–Syria border. The U.S.-backed New Syrian Army rebel faction recaptured the Al-Tanf post on the Syrian side of the border in early March 2016, and the Al-Waleed border crossing on the Iraqi side of the border was recaptured by Iraqi pro-government tribal militias backed by U.S.-led forces in early August. In August 2016, the BBC published photographs taken in June that year which it said showed United Kingdom Special Forces soldiers apparently guarding the perimeter of the Al-Tanf base.

In March 2017, the Revolutionary Commando Army (RCA), successor of the New Syrian Army, re-opened the border crossing, resuming cross-border civilian traffic. A group referred to as the Army of Iraqi Tribes was said to control the Iraqi side of the crossing. In April–May 2017, it was reported that U.S. 5th Special Forces Group were training Syrian rebels at Al-Tanf. In June 2017, the Iraqi Armed Forces announced that the Iraqi Army and Sunni tribal fighters, supported by U.S.-led Coalition aircraft, had cleared the Iraqi side of the border of the remaining IS fighters in the vicinity of the U.S. base.

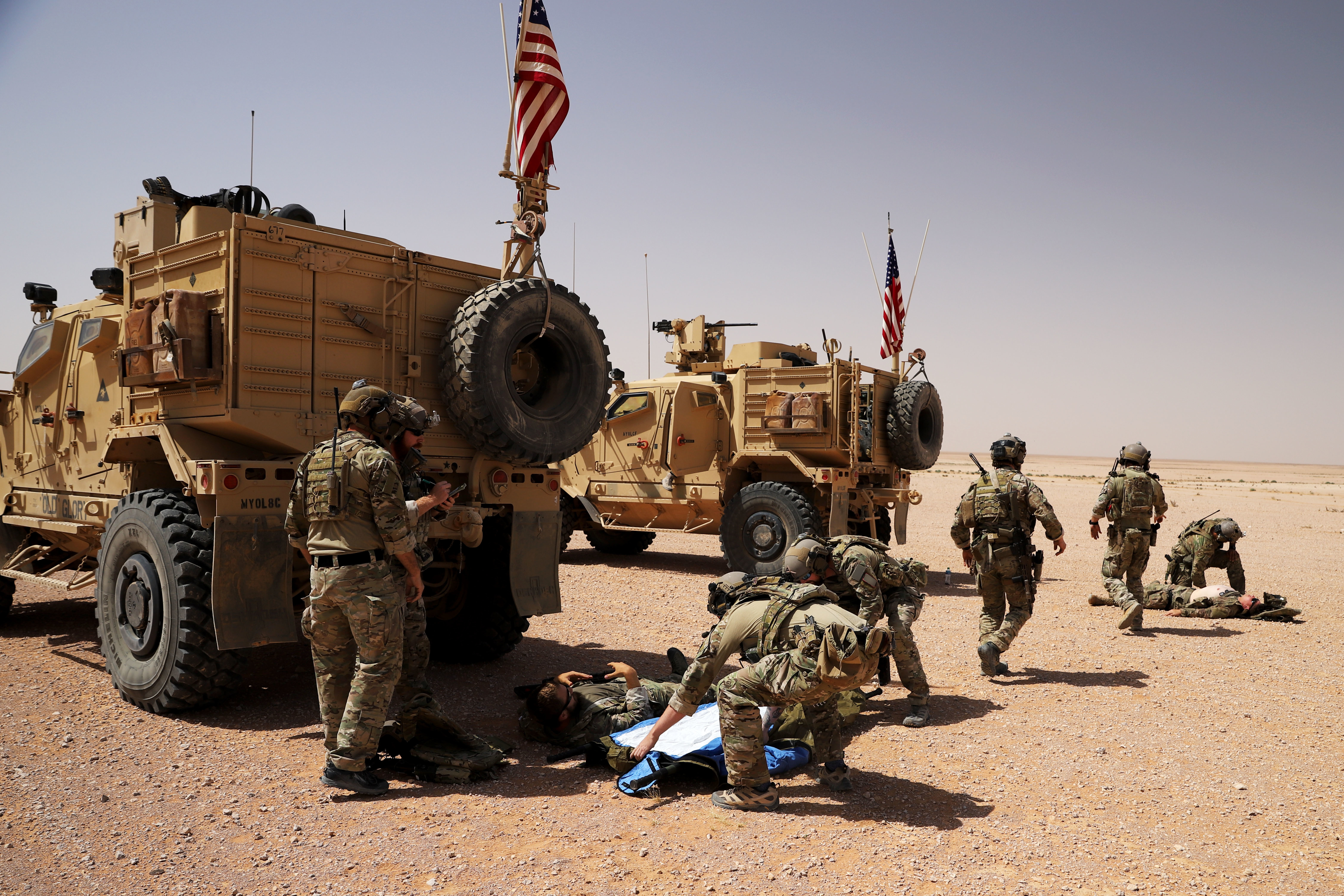
U.S. Green Berets conducting a medevac exercise during a patrol within the Deconfliction Zone on 27 May 2020

By late 2017, Arab media began calling the "deconfliction area" around the Tanf base "the 55 km area", as it was composed of a half-circle area with a radius of 55 km (35 miles) with the base at its center. By 2019, the Combined Joint Task Force – Operation Inherent Resolve (CJTF-OIR) anti-IS coalition referred to the area simply as the Deconfliction Zone (DCZ) with the Al-Tanf Garrison (ATG) at the center. The Coalition remained able to conduct military operations against the Islamic State.

=== Operational history ===
In September 2017, Russian government-owned media outlet RIA Novosti reported, with a reference to unnamed military and diplomatic sources, that the U.S. had voiced readiness to leave Al-Tanf but did not say when. In August 2018, U.S. State Department representative William V. Roebuck traveled to Syria. "We are prepared to stay here, as the president Donald Trump has made clear," he said after meeting with Kurdish rebel officials.

By 2018, the Al-Tanf area hosted five Free Syrian Army factions including the Lions of the East Army, the Forces of Martyr Ahmad al-Abdo, the Army of Free Tribes, the Revolutionary Commando Army (also known as Maghawir al-Thawra), and Al-Qaryatayn Martyrs Brigade. The U.S. referred to them as part of the "Vetted Syrian Opposition". According to the U.S., these fighters were permitted only to launch offensives against IS and not against Bashar al-Assad's Syrian Arab Armed Forces, though clashes with pro-Syrian government elements have occurred.

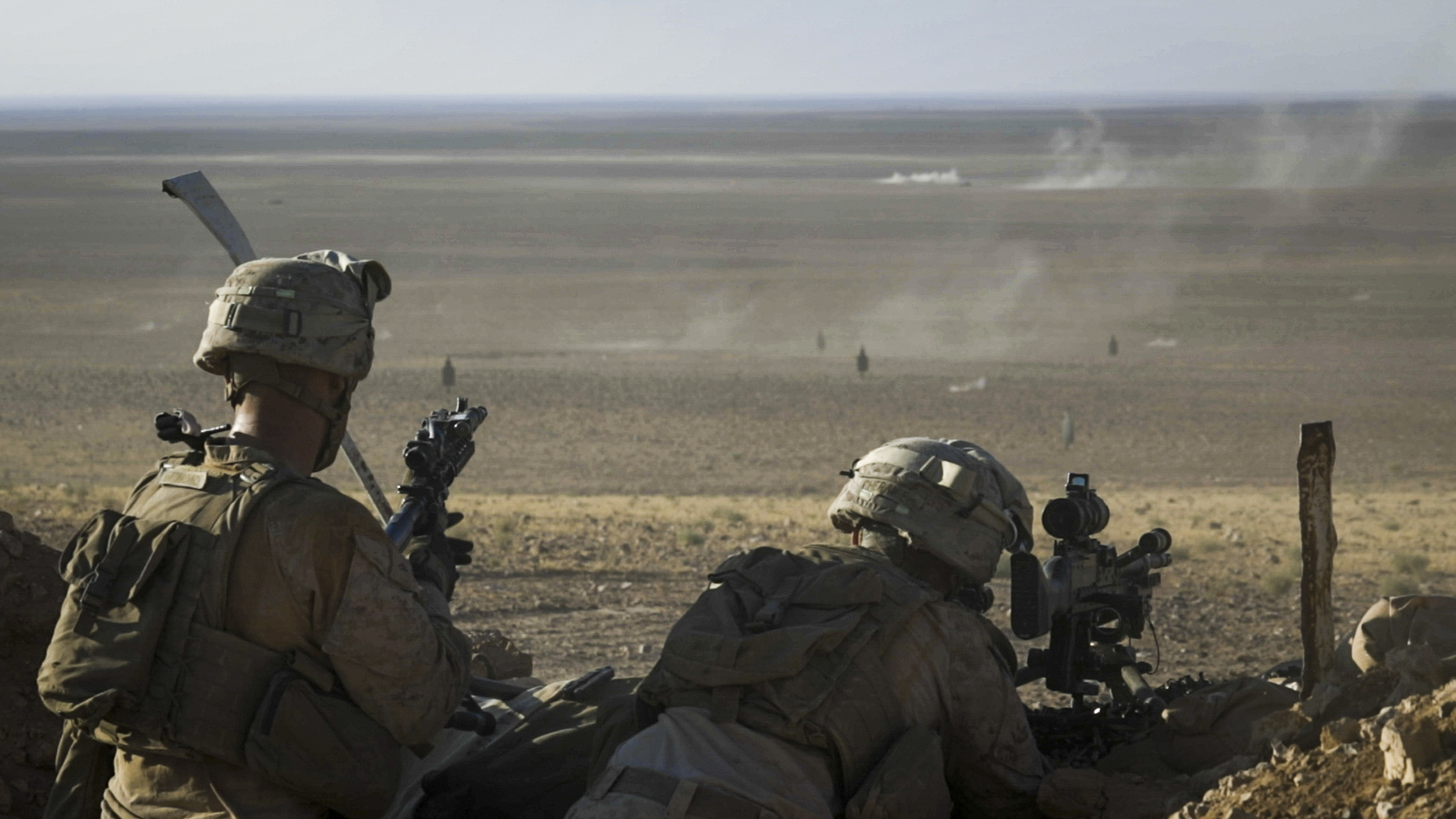
3rd Battalion, 7th Marines attached to SP-MAGTF-CR-CC during Operation Apex Teufelhunden, a live fire exercise near Al-Tanf, on 7 September 2018

In a February 2018 letter, the U.S. military justified its occupation by citing the doctrine of collective self-defense as necessary to defend Iraq, the U.S. itself, and other states from IS and other active terrorist groups. In October 2018, General Joseph Votel, commander of United States Central Command (CENTCOM), stated that U.S. forces in Al-Tanf did not "have a counter Iranian mission here. We have a defeat ISIS mission," but nevertheless acknowledged that American presence in the area had "an indirect effect on some malign activities that Iran and their various proxies and surrogates would like to pursue down here." On 7 September 2018, the CENTCOM announced a CJTF-OIR live fire exercise around the Al-Tanf garrison, named Operation Apex Teufelhunden. The announcement described it as a "defeat-ISIS exercise".

After the announced withdrawal of U.S. troops from Syria, U.S. National Security Advisor John R. Bolton said in early 2019 that U.S. operations in the Al-Tanf area would continue as a part of the U.S. effort to counter "Iranian influence" in Syria. US officials were later reported as saying that the location of the base was blocking a road used by Iranian forces and proxies to enter Syria. On 28 January 2019, Jordanian Foreign Minister Ayman Safadi ruled out the prospect of Jordanian forces seizing control of Al-Tanf after American ground troops leave Syria, saying, "Al-Tanf is on the other side of the Jordanian border. As I said, Jordan will not cross its border. We will take every measure we have to protect our security...but arrangements on the other side of the border after withdrawal will have to be agreed by all parties, and they have to ensure the safety and security in the area."

The Trump administration announced on 22 February 2019 that around 400 U.S. troops would remain in Syria post-withdrawal, with about half garrisoned in areas under the control of the Democratic Autonomous Administration of North and East Syria with another half stationed at the Al-Tanf garrison. The 200 at Al-Tanf were to remain indefinitely.

On 4 June 2019, representatives of more than 30 countries participated in a meeting with the command of CJTF-OIR in Kuwait where the issue of stepping up efforts to fight terrorism in Iraq and Syria was discussed. Amid a period of heightened regional tensions with Iran, the Pentagon announced on 18 June that another 1,000 troops will be deployed to the Middle East, presumably including the Al-Tanf base. In October 2019, in the context of the pullout of American troops from northern Syria, The New York Times reported that the Pentagon was planning to "leave 150 Special Operations forces at a base called al-Tanf". In November 2019, U.S. President Donald Trump stated that U.S. troops were in Syria "only for oil".

On 23 October 2019, the RCA reportedly seized $3.5 million worth of Captagon pills heading to the Rukban refugee camp in a major bust on weapons and drug smuggling of IS underground networks. On 16 April 2020, a number of Syrian rebels at Al-Tanf base defected to the Syrian government in a convoy.

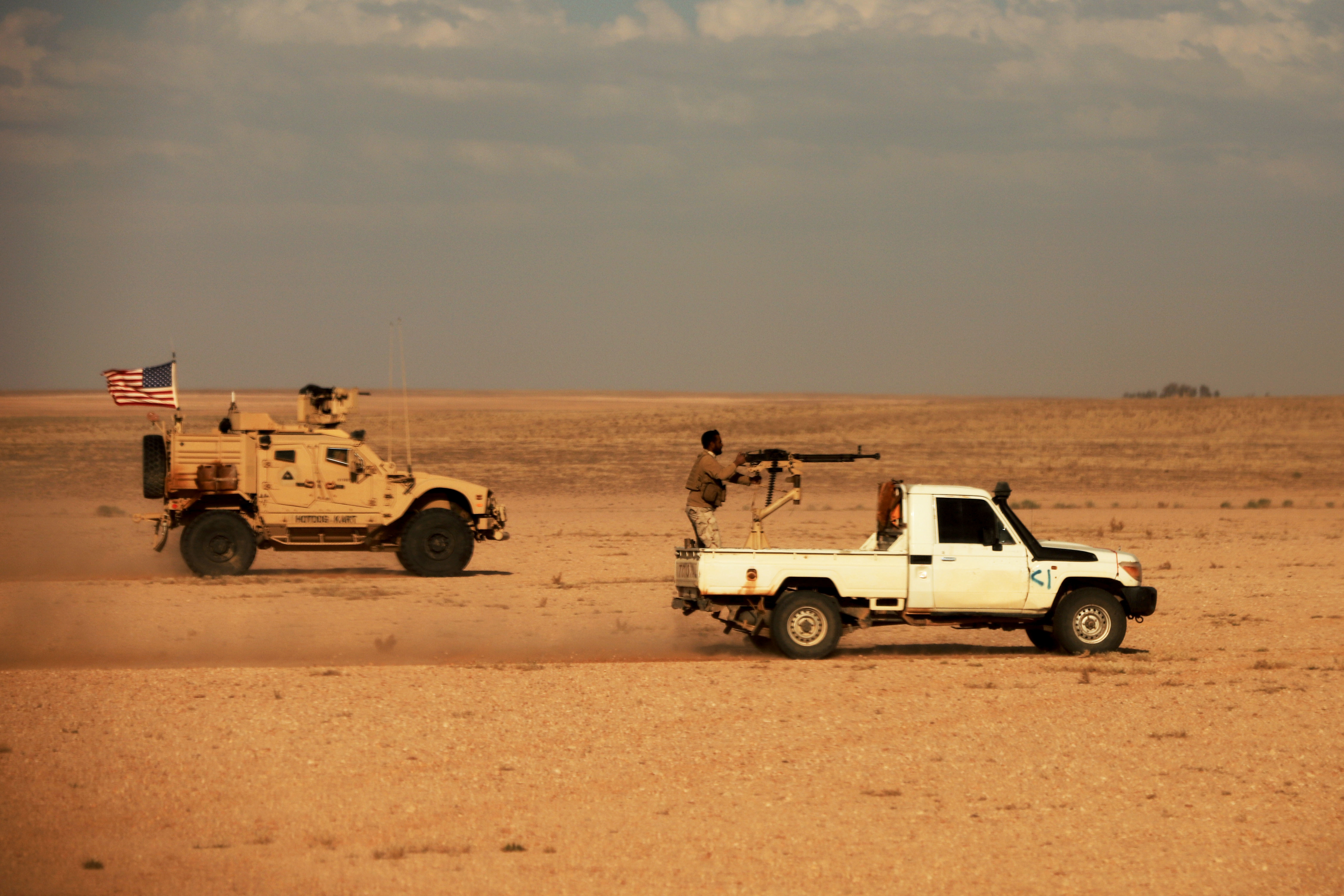
U.S. Green Berets and Maghawir al-Thawra (MaT/RCA) on a joint patrol near Al-Tanf, 29 April 2020

In May 2020, the U.S. military published images of special operations forces personnel at Al-Tanf training with an advanced Israeli-made Smart Shooter SMASH 2000 "smart" optical sighting system attached to their M4A1 rifles. It was unclear if special operations units in the region had actually adopted the computerized optic or if the training was part of field trials or another type of demonstration.

In 2021, it was reported that Al-Tanf hosted around 350 foreign military personnel and civilians, including some members of British and French forces. In August 2022, it was reported that there are approximately 900 U.S. troops in Syria, with most of them split between the Al-Tanf base and Syria's eastern oil fields.

In October 2024, U.S. officers in Al-Tanf placed the Abu Khatab Brigade and other rebel units under the joint command of the RCA as the Syrian Free Army (SFA). The number of fighters then grew from 800 to up to 3,000. All of them continued to be armed by the U.S. and received a monthly salary of 400 dollars, almost twelve times what the Assad government conscripts had received. For the 2024 offensives, the SFA and HTS worked together and communications between the two forces were coordinated by the Americans in Al-Tanf.

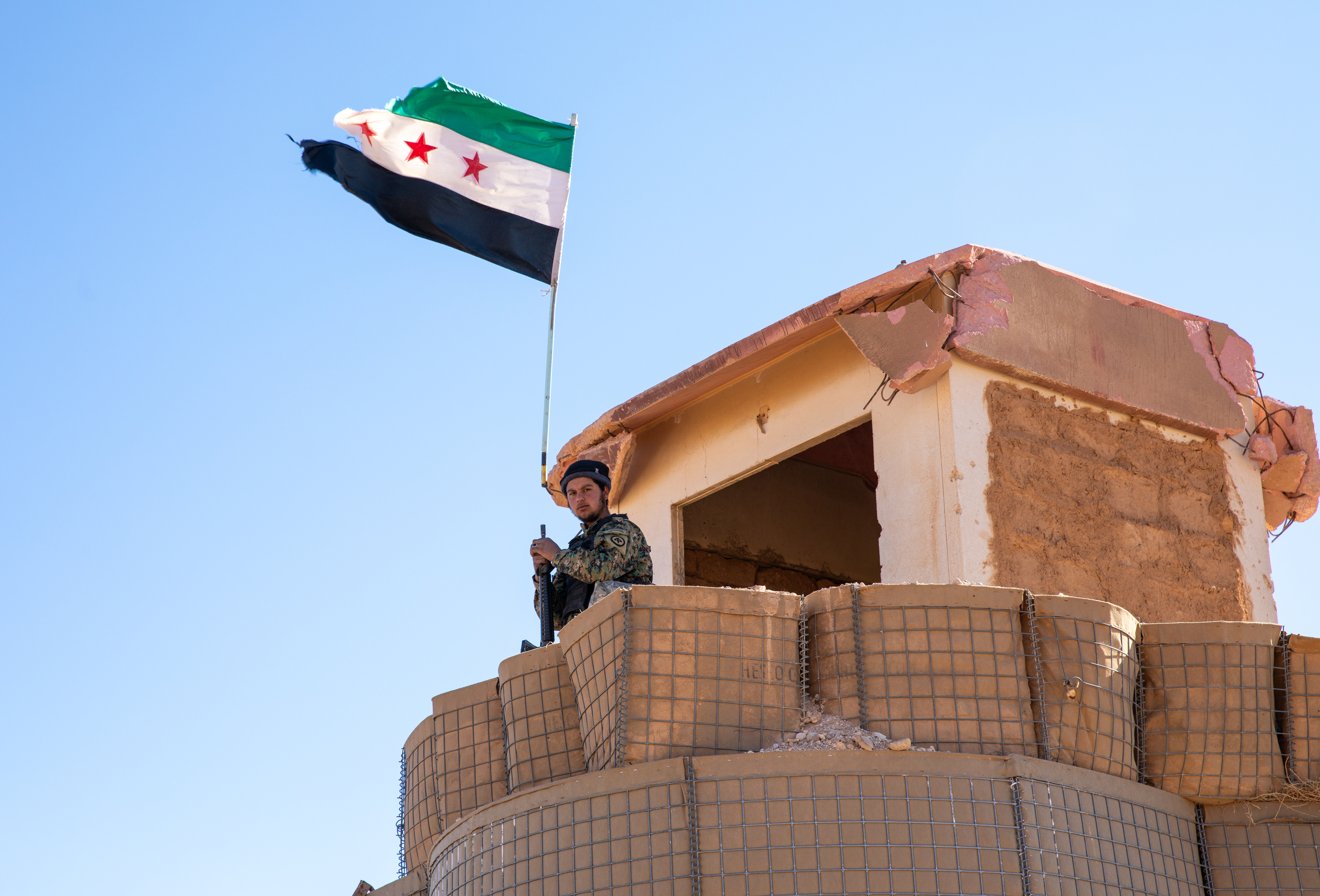
A SFA soldier stands atop a watchtower at a combat outpost in the Deconfliction Zone at Al-Tanf, 23 December 2024

In December 2024, the Syrian Free Army launched the Palmyra offensive (2024) from Al-Tanf on Palmyra, with logistical support from U.S. forces. Within two days, the SFA quickly captured Palmyra and then proceeded to enter the Syrian capital city Damascus from the east during the ensuing fall of the Assad regime.

=== Attacks on the base ===
On 8 April 2017, Islamic State launched a complex and coordinated attack against a United States Special Operations Forces outpost at Al-Tanf. IS started the attack by striking the base with a suicide car bomb and then assaulting with around 20-30 suicide commandos. The attack was repelled first by gunfire from the allied rebels and U.S. special forces, followed by airstrikes from the CJTF-OIR coalition which killed most of the IS force and destroyed their vehicles. Three Syrian rebels were also reported dead.

On 18 May 2017, U.S. fighter jets struck a column of pro-Assad militia forces advancing towards the base, reportedly destroying two T-62 tanks. Shortly thereafter, Syrian government forces were reported to continue their Syrian Desert campaign (May–July 2017), using advanced Russian-made weapons and were supported by Russian helicopters, according to a report acknowledged on 26 May by the Russian Defence Ministry's Zvezda media outlet. At the end of December 2017, the Chief of the Russian General Staff Valery Gerasimov said that the U.S. garrison at Al-Tanf was fully isolated by Syrian government forces following the desert offensive in the area.

Around 16 February 2020, an Iranian-backed "rogue" proxy group reportedly breached the deconfliction zone at Al-Tanf, and were then repelled by the RCA.

On 20 October 2021, the base was attacked by drones in the 2021 Al-Tanf drone attack, causing no injuries. On 14 December 2021, a Royal Air Force Typhoon FGR4 shot down a small hostile drone with an ASRAAM near the base.

In June 2022, Russia carried out airstrikes at the Al-Tanf military base, after first notifying the United States of their intentions, allowing local forces to relocate before the strike. U.S. officials said that Russia claimed the RCA had carried out a roadside bomb attack on Russian forces, though the officials stated they did not believe this and accused Russia of just looking for a reason to carry out airstrikes in the location.

The United States reported a drone attack in the vicinity of the Al-Tanf base on the night of 15 August 2022. All but one of the drones were repelled and despite a single drone detonating in a compound used by the Maghaweir al-Thowra, the attack did not result in any casualties or damage. Shortly thereafter, the Syrian Foreign Ministry released a statement demanding that "the American side must immediately and unconditionally withdraw its military forces that are present on the territory of Syria illegally."

On 24 August 2022, U.S. President Joe Biden ordered airstrikes against claimed Islamic Revolutionary Guard Corps targets after a number of rockets struck near the U.S. military base at Al-Tanf on 15 August and an airstrike by the Russian military in an area held by the Syrian opposition. The U.S. strikes targeted eleven bunkers in Deir ez-Zor used to store weapons, according to the CENTCOM. A spokesperson for the Iranian foreign ministry denied that Iran had any link to targets hit and condemned the strike as "a violation of Syria's sovereignty and territorial integrity".

Another drone attack on Al-Tanf in mid-October 2023 left 15 U.S. soldiers with traumatic brain injury and two other soldiers with minor injuries. All injured U.S. personnel had returned to duty by 12 November.

On 28 January 2024, the Tower 22 drone attack carried out at Tower 22, a military outpost near Al-Tanf on the Jordanian side of the border, resulted in three U.S. soldiers killed and more than 30 injured. The Islamic Resistance in Iraq, an Iran-backed militia, claimed responsibility for the attack.

=== Post-Assad era ===
On 29 October 2025, the Syrian troops stationed at Al-Tanf base were transferred from the 70th Division under the Ministry of Defense to the Ministry of Interior and assigned to the Desert Security Forces under Ahmad al-Tamer. The unit will presumably continue to operate in the Syrian Desert, which is a hotspot for ISIS activity.

On 11 February 2026, "American forces withdrew entirely from Al-Tanf base today," a Syrian military source told Agence France-Presse. Another Syrian military source said U.S. forces had been removing equipment from the base for the past 15 days and would "continue to coordinate with [personnel in Al-Tanf] from Jordan." The Syrian Observatory for Human Rights reported that the Al-Tanf base was handed over to the 54th Division under the Ministry of Defense, marking a complete withdrawal of the international coalition from the base towards Jordan. U.S. CENTCOM and the Government of Syria confirmed the U.S. withdawal from Al-Tanf on 12 February.

== Criticism ==
Ba'athist Syria deemed the U.S. military presence in Al-Tanf illegal and "consider[ed] the presence of Turkish and U.S. troops on its territory as an aggression and demands immediate and unconditional withdrawal of foreign forces from its territory." The Iranian, Russian, and Chinese governments publicly supported the Ba'athist government's position, regularly criticizing the American presence in southeastern Syria. China's foreign minister has called on the United States to "respect other countries' sovereignty, independence and territorial integrity, immediately end the troops' illegal occupation and plundering in Syria."

On 8 February 2018, following the Battle of Khasham in eastern Syria, in which the Syrian Democratic Forces and United States inflicted multiple casualties among Russian mercenaries of the Wagner Group, the Russian foreign ministry spokesperson, Maria Zakharova said: "The unlawful American armed presence in Syria presents a serious challenge to the peace process and to the country's territorial integrity and unity. A 55-kilometer zone unilaterally created by Americans around their military base near al-Tanf is being used by the scattered units of ISIS militants" for evading pursuit by government forces and re-grouping. In mid-February 2018, Russia's foreign minister Sergey Lavrov said that U.S. military presence in Syria generally and in the area of Al-Tanf specifically "was illegal and unacceptable."

On 27 February 2019, Syria and Russia released a joint statement demanding all U.S. forces leave Syria, while also demanding U.S. forces allow Russian and Syrian authorities to evacuate the Rukban refugee camp along the Jordanian border to "relocate people in the Rubkan area and guarantee them safe passage to their places of permanent residence". Russia argued that the U.S. was holding the refugee camp "hostage" and potentially as human shields within the territory. According to a 24 March report by the Voice of America, the Revolutionary Commando Army Syrian rebel group, which has been maintaining aid access and provides security for the Rukban camp, said both refugees and U.S.-backed rebels in the zone depended on U.S. protection against attacks by pro-Syrian government militias and Islamic State-affiliated jihadists. A Rukban camp spokesman asserted that it was the Syrians and Russians that were "embargoing" the camp to force the refugees into reconciliation and to pressure U.S. troops to leave the strategically important base.

The Wikipedia article about the subject has also been criticised in the past. According to a 2019 The New York Times video report, "the internet is also full of conspiracy theories about the base. Some seem to have been influenced by Russia's statements. Take Al-Tanf's Wikipedia page. The original entry smears the Al-Tanf rebels by calling them armed gangs and militants that are training terrorists, who the U.S. helps transport. The user who wrote all this has uploaded photos elsewhere that show a Russia connection [to the English Wikipedia article]." According to the same report, "Al-Tanf is just one example of how Russia's presence in Syria has contributed to yet another reason the U.S. mission has expanded — preventing unchecked Russian influence."

== See also ==
- List of United States military bases in Syria
