= Syrian Free Army =

Syrian opposition group in the Syrian Civil War

- Leaders: Salem Turki al-Antri (February 2024 – May 2025); Muhammad Farid al-Qasim (September 2022 – February 2024); Muhannad Al-Talla (? – September 2022); Captain Abdullah al-Zoubi (since December 2016, RCA); Bara Fares (media spokesperson); Muhammad Jarrah (spokesman); Khazal al-Sarhan (until December 2016, NSA); Mozahem al-Saloum (spokesperson, former, NSA)
- Dates active: May 2015 – December 2016 (New Syrian Army) December 2016 – November 2022 (Revolutionary Commando Army) November 2022 – May 2025 (Syrian Free Army)
- Groups: Ghosts of the Desert; Allahu Akbar Brigade
- Headquarters: Al-Tanf
- Active regions: Damascus Governorate; Homs Governorate; Rif Dimashq Governorate; Deir ez-Zor Governorate, Syria; Anbar Governorate, Iraq
- Ideology: Democracy; Secularism; Anti-Assadism
- Status: Disbanded, formally integrated into the Desert Security Forces under the Ministry of Interior
- Size: 120 (2015); 300 (2016); 40–60 (November 2017); 300 (October 2018); 500 (2023); 3,000 (October 2024); 600 (December 2024)
- Part of: (Syrian opposition) Free Syrian Army: (Syrian opposition) Authenticity and Development Front (until August 2016)
- Wars: Syrian civil war

The Syrian Free Army (SFA, Arabic: جيش حرو السوري, romanized: Jaysh Ḥurrah al-Sūriyā), previously known as the Revolutionary Commando Army (RCA, Arabic: جيش مغاوير الثورة), and the New Syrian Army (NSA, Arabic: جيش سوريا الجديد), was a United States Army–trained opposition faction in southeast Syria. It was hosted at the US military's al-Tanf base and is now part of the Syrian Ministry of Interior.

Founded as an expansion of the Authenticity and Development Front by Syrian Arab Army defectors and other rebels during the Syrian civil war on 20 May 2015, the New Syrian Army sought to expel the Islamic State from southeastern Syria. In December 2016, the New Syrian Army dissolved, and the remnants of the group formed the Revolutionary Commando Army.

The group was known for corruption, which led to the U.S. Central Command dismissing its former top official Mohanad al-Tala in 2022. In the aftermath, following an alleged U.S. Central Command attempt to integrate the group into the Syrian Democratic Forces, it rebranded as the Syrian Free Army.

== History ==
=== New Syrian Army ===
The New Syrian Army was established by remnants of the Allahu Akbar Brigade, part of the Authenticity and Development Front and formerly based in Abu Kamal. The NSA was formed on 20 May 2015, and its fighters were trained in Jordan.

On 16 November 2015, the New Syrian Army was deployed at al-Tanf in southeastern Syria, near Iraq and Jordan, and carried out a raid, with or without US aerial support. No further information was given.

On 5 March 2016, the NSA and another FSA group, the Forces of Martyr Ahmad al-Abdo, captured the al-Tanf border crossing from ISIL in a cross-border raid from Jordan.

In May 2016, an Islamic State suicide attack struck an NSA base near al-Tanf, which resulted in a large number of casualties. The attack brought to the surface underlying tensions and a lack of morale within the group, whose members alleged that the US failed to provide them with the equipment promised.

In June 2016, the NSA's base near al-Tanf was hit by multiple cluster bombs from Russian airstrikes, killing 2 and injuring 18. Russia denied responsibility for the airstrike, although photos released by the NSA identified the bombs as Russian RBK-500 cluster bombs which were delivered from Khmeimim Air Base in Latakia.

Later in June, the group launched an offensive against ISIL in Abu Kamal. The offensive was repelled by ISIL.

On 3 August 2016, the New Syrian Army was expelled from the Authenticity and Development Front.

=== Ghosts of the Desert ===
The Ghosts of the Desert (Arabic: أشباح الصحراء) was an NSA-affiliated anti-ISIL insurgent group that covertly operated in ISIL-held towns in southeastern Syria and southwestern Iraq such as Abu Kamal, Mayadin, and al-Qaim. Since March 2016, they initially sprayed graffiti and raised Syrian and Iraqi flags in the towns, but began to conduct covert military activities the next month, such as sabotage, assassinations of ISIL fighters, and marking positions for airstrikes. The group supplied military intelligence to the US Air Force that allowed them to kill Abu Waheeb in May 2016 in the Iraqi town of Rutbah after the group marked his location.

=== Revolutionary Commando Army ===
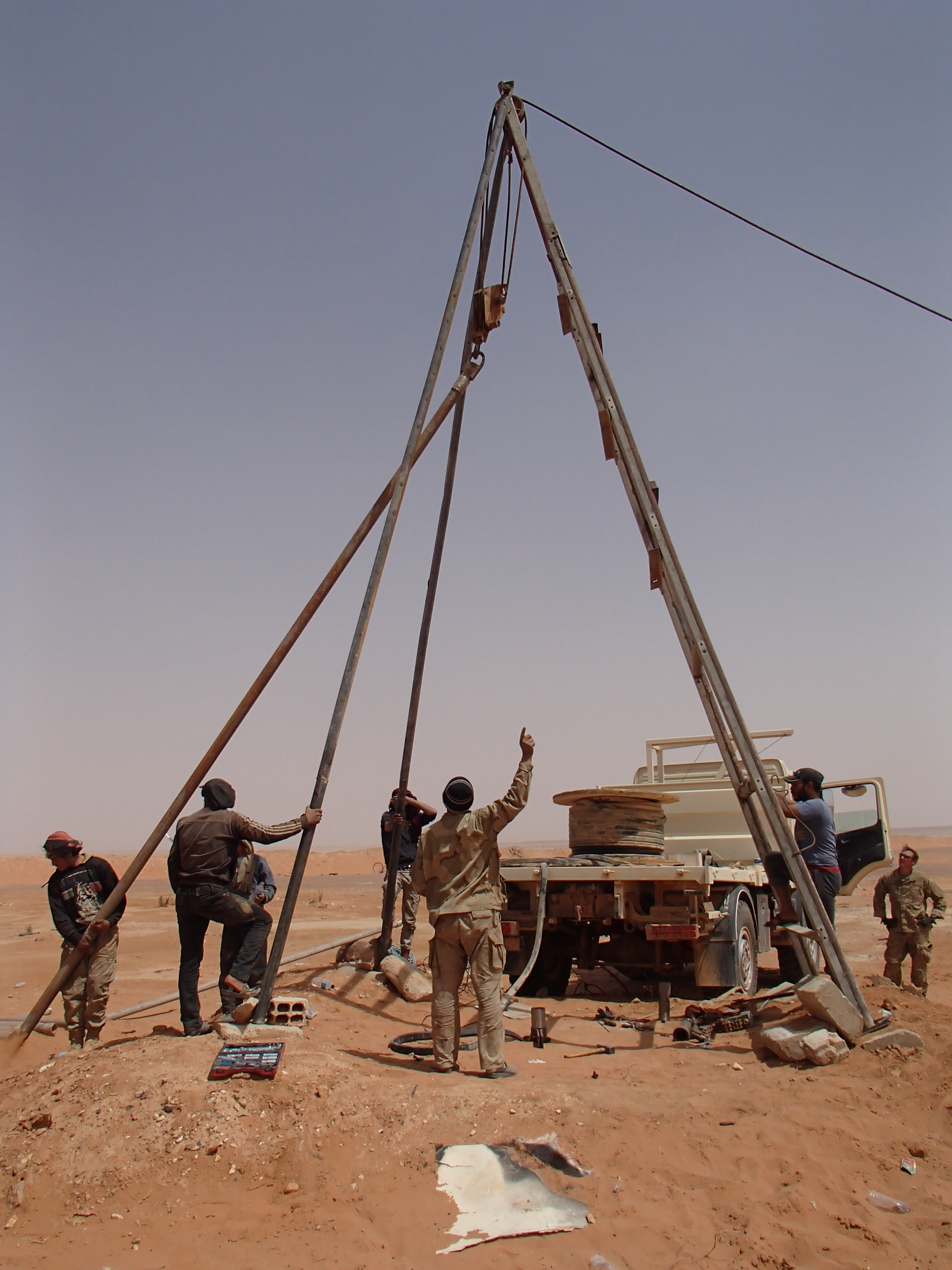
Members of the Revolutionary Commando Army and a US Army soldier repair a water well in Al-Tanf.

In December 2016, the New Syrian Army dissolved after internal disputes. Some of its remnants regrouped under the name Revolutionary Commando Army (RCA), led by Captain Abdullah al-Zoubi.

On 30 April 2017, the RCA launched an offensive into eastern Syria, reaching the Deir ez-Zor Governorate and capturing the village of Humaymah, south of the T2 pumping station. Two days later, the rebels attacked and captured several sites in the region, including: Tarwazeh al-Wa'er, Sereit al-Wa'er, Mount Ghrab, Swab desert, al-Kamm Swab, the T3 Pumping Station, Me'izeileh and Tarwazeh al-Attshaneh. On 6 May, FSA groups including the RCA captured several sites in the Badiya region of Homs Governorate to the south of Palmyra including Dahlouz and al-Halbeh areas. The RCA was supplied with IAG Guardian armoured personnel carriers by the US during the operation.

In late November 2017, at least 180 fighters in the RCA were relieved of duty. According to the United States Central Command, the fighters "completed their military service", while according to the group's spokesman, they were removed due to their "weak performance". As result, between 40 and 60 fighters were left in the group. The unit increased in numbers after that point, with c. 300 fighters serving with the RCA by October 2018.

In 2021, reports emerged that several explosions took place in al-Tanf. The RCA stated that they came from training exercises that it was conducting in the region. On 20 October 2021, the RCA, other opposition elements at al-Tanf, and the US garrison there were attacked by drones, causing no injuries.

On 23 September 2022, the US-led coalition dismissed RCA's commander Brigadier General Muhannad Ahmad and replaced him with Captain Muhammad Farid, a former leader of the Qaryatayn Martyrs' Brigade. This caused a group of RCA leaders styling themselves as the military council of RCA to reject the new leader and seize control of part of the al-Tanf base, leading to a brief siege in which the military council was confronted by the main RCA group and US forces, submitting to the new leadership soon after.

=== Syrian Free Army ===
Following another meeting with US forces, the group changed its name to the "Syrian Free Army" on 23 October 2022.

On 29 February 2024, the Syrian Free Army announced the appointment of Salem Turki al-Antri as their new leader, replacing Muhammad Farid al-Qasim. The announcement was made through a statement and photos on the group's official website at the US-operated al-Tanf military base in eastern Homs Governorate. The group expressed excitement about the new opportunities al-Antri's leadership will provide.

On 7 December 2024, the Syrian Free Army captured al-Qaryatayn, as well as al-Sukhnah and participated in the Palmyra offensive capturing the city, after this they moved west and fought in the Battle of Damascus alongside the Southern Operations Room, taking territory in the northern half of the city.

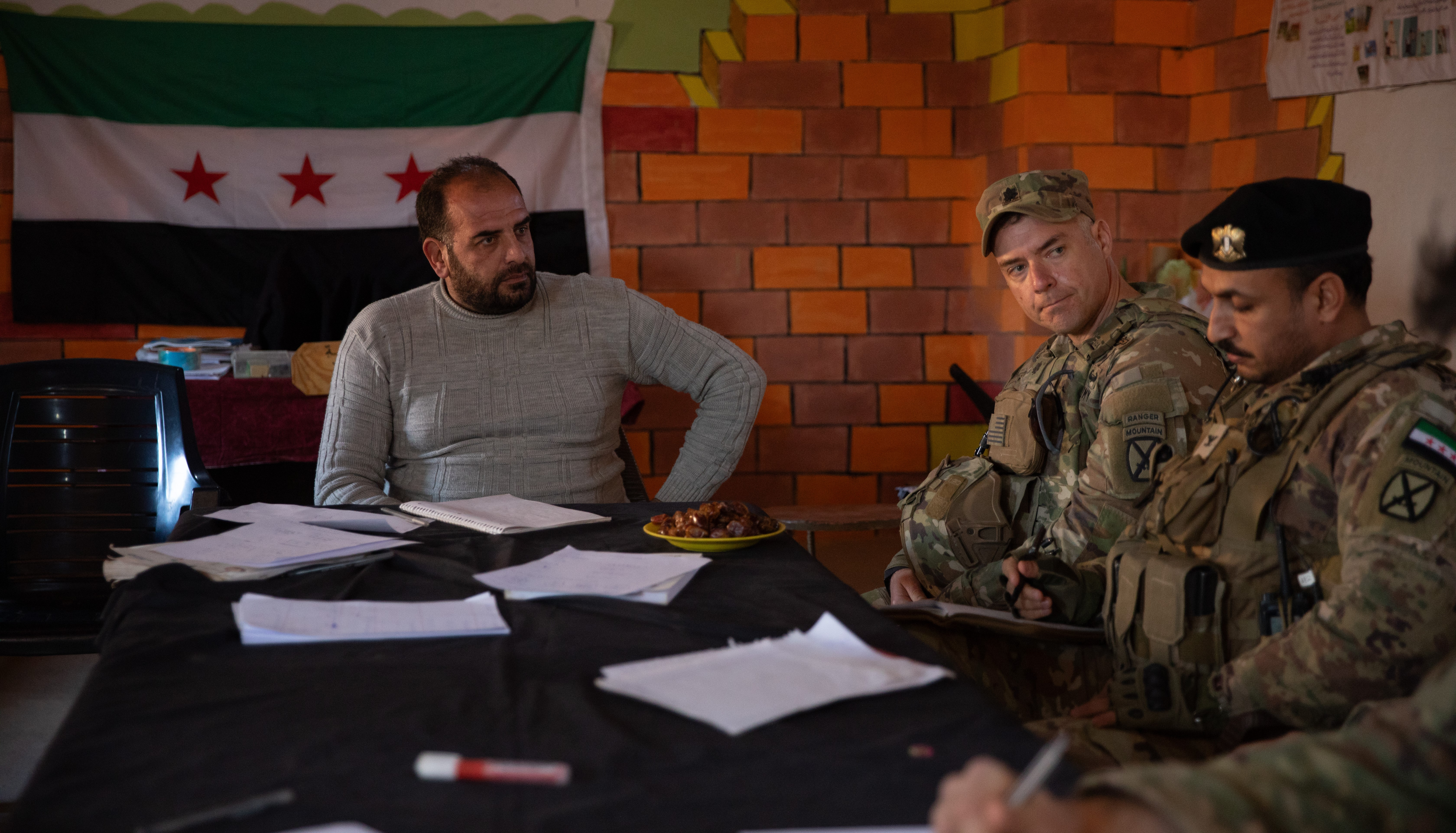
On 1 January 2025, US military officers spoke with the commander of the Syrian Free Army and the principal of a local school near Rukban.

At the Syrian Revolution Victory Conference on 29 January 2025, many leaders of the armed opposition, including al-Antri, attended.

In a late January 2025 interview between Lizzie Porter of Abu Dhabi–based newspaper The National and the group's leader, Salem Turki al-Antri, he stated that the amount of land controlled by the SFA has tripled, from 55 to more than 150 square kilometers of land.

On 3 February, al-Antri said his troops were negotiating their integration into the Defense Ministry with the Syrian transitional government.

On 30–31 March, during Eid al-Fitr, SFA soldiers arrived in al-Dumayr at the request of the Ministry of Interior to assist General Security, helping to reduce motorcycle movement and distributing mine awareness leaflets. The SFA media office denied rumors that SFA and US forces were planning on turning al-Dumayr Air Base into an American base.

On 17 May, the SFA announced its continued deployment at al-Seen Airport. Three days later, delegates from the Ministry of Defense conducted an inspection tour at the airport.

In June 2025, The Jerusalem Post indicated that the Syrian Free Army was part of the new 70th Division under the Ministry of Defense. However, these soldiers were transferred to the jurisdiction of the Ministry of Interior at the end of October of the same year.
