= March 2023 northeastern Syria clashes =

2023 clashes during the Syrian civil war

2023 Northeastern Syria clashes
- Part of the American-led intervention and Iranian involvement in the Syrian civil war
Date	23–24 March 2023 (1 day)
Location	Northeastern Syria: Al-Hasakah Governorate; Deir ez-Zor Governorate
Result	Retaliation strikes between Iranian-backed militias and the United States

Belligerents
United States	Iranian-backed militias Iran; Syria

Units involved
US Army; US Air Force	Liwa Al-Ghaliboun; Islamic Revolutionary Guard Corps; Syrian Armed Forces

Casualties and losses
1 killed, 25 injured	8 killed (Pentagon claim) 19 killed (SOHR claim)

On March 23, 2023, at 1:38 p.m. local time (UTC+03:00), a kamikaze drone allegedly of Iranian origin struck a coalition base at Abu Hajar Airport near Rmelan, Al-Hasakah Governorate in northeastern Syria. As a response, The US military carried out a series of attacks using F-15 Fighters at the direction of President Joe Biden. On 24 March 2023, two retaliatory strikes at near oil and gas fields known as Conoco in the vicinity of Deir Ezzor by multiple rockets and at Green Village (US military base) by three drones targeted US and coalition forces.

== Attacks ==
On March 23, 2023, at 1:38 p.m. local time (UTC+03:00), a kamikaze drone allegedly of Iranian origin struck a coalition base at Abu Hajar Airport near Rmelan, al-Hasakah Governorate in northeastern Syria, killing one United States contractor and injuring five servicemen and second contractor. The New York Times reported, US officials said the main air defense system at the base was "not fully operational" at the time of Thursday's Drone Strike.

In retaliation, U.S. President Joe Biden authorized a response with an airstrike on IRGC-linked targets, including a weapons warehouse in the Harabish neighborhood in Deir ez-Zor, and military posts in the al-Mayadin and Abu Kamal countryside, killing 14 people including nine Syrians, according to SOHR.

On 24 March, 10 rockets were launched at the Green Village near al-Omar oil field which injured another American serviceman. By afternoon, another rocket attack targeted US forces near the oil and gas fields of Conoco, east of Deir ez-Zor. On 30 March, the Pentagon revealed that twelve American were wounded in total with six U.S. troops in Syria suffering traumatic brain injuries due to the two attacks by Iran-backed militias.

A little-known militant group known as Liwa Al-Ghaliboun (The Brigade of Those who Prevail) claimed responsibility for the initial drone attack, although some observers believe the group to simply be a front group for a larger Iranian-backed group or the IRGC.

== Reaction and aftermath ==
On 27 March, the White House said that the attacks would not trigger a U.S. withdrawal from its nearly eight-year-long deployment in Syria. on 23 March 2023, United States Central Command commander Michael Kurilla said in his speech to House Committee on Armed Services that today Iran has grown its military power exponentially compared to five years ago and claimed Iranian-backed groups have struck 78 times on US troops in Syria since January 2021. Meanwhile, the Syrian foreign ministry condemned the attacks and stated that Washington lied about where it had targeted and pledged to "end the American occupation" in Syria. Iran's foreign ministry accused the U.S. forces of targeting "civilian sites".

As of 13 April, US personnel wounded in the clashes reached at least 25, including troops diagnosed with traumatic brain injury.

== See also ==
- December 2019 United States airstrikes in Iraq and Syria
- February 2021 United States airstrike in Syria
- June 2021 United States airstrike in Syria
- 2023 Homs drone strike
