= List of airports in Syria =

Map of airports in Syria

This is a list of airports in Syria, a country in Western Asia. Syria borders Lebanon and the Mediterranean Sea to the west, Turkey to the north, Iraq to the east, Jordan to the south, and Palestine to the southwest. Its capital city is Damascus.

== Airports ==
Airport names shown in bold had scheduled passenger service on commercial airlines (as of October 2026).

=== Public airports ===
Name	Location served	Governorate	Held by	ICAO	IATA	Utilization	Helipads	Runways	Shelters	Squadrons	Coordinates
Abu Hajar Airfield	Rmelan	al-Hasakah	Syrian revolution	none	none	Agricultural military	?	1	0	?	36°53′52″N 41°59′51″E
**Aleppo International Airport**	Aleppo	Aleppo	Syrian revolution	OSAP	ALP	Public military/ civil	10	1	8	? Squadron Mi-8 Hip C ? Squadron Mi-8 Hip C	36°10′50″N 37°13′27″E
**Damascus International Airport**	Damascus	Damascus	Syrian revolution	OSDI	DAM	Public military/ civil	0	2	16	522 Squadron An-24, An-26, Il-76; 565 Squadron Yak-40; 575 Squadron Falcon 20E, Falcon 900; 585 Squadron Tu-134, Boeing 737	33°24′38″N 36°30′51″E
**Deir ez-Zor International Airport**	Deir ez-Zor	Deir ez-Zor	Syria	OSDZ	DEZ	Public military/ civil	0	1	4	8 Squadron MiG-21MF/UM	35°17′07″N 40°10′33″E
Latakia International Airport - Khmeimim Air Base	Latakia	Latakia	Syria Russia	OSLK	LTK	Public military/ civil	15	1	0	618 Squadron Mi-14, Ka-25, Ka-27	35°24′03″N 35°56′55″E
Qamishli International Airport	Qamishli	Al-Hasakah	Syrian revolution	OSKL	KAC	Public military/ civil	0	1	0		37°01′14″N 41°11′29″E
Al-Malikiyah Municipal Airfield	Al-Malikiyah	al-Hasakah	Syrian revolution	none	none	Agricultural military	?	1	0	?	37°11′8″N 042°13′56″E
Palmyra Airport	Palmyra	Homs	Syrian revolution	OSPR	PMS	Public; Military	0	1	16		34°33′27″N 38°19′01″E
Hama Military Airport	Hama	Hama	Syria	none	OS58	Military	?	?	?		35.118156°N 36.711186°E
Hamidiyah Municipal Airfield	Al-Hamidiyah	Tartus	Syrian revolution Russia		QTR	Agricultural military	0	1	0		34°47′32″N 35°55′25″E

=== Closed airports ===
Name	Location served	Governorate	Held by	ICAO	IATA	Utilization	Helipads	Runways	Shelters	Squadrons	Coordinates
Fiq Airfield	Fiq & Al ‘Al	Quneitra	Israel		none	Public	0	1	0	0	32°47′12″N 35°43′05″E
Tabqa Airport (Tabqa Airbase)	Tabqa	Raqqa	Syria		none	Public military	0	1	18	?	35°45′17″N 38°34′01″E

== See also ==
- Al-Dumayr Military Airport
- List of airports by ICAO code: O#OS - Syria
- List of Syrian Air Force bases
- List of Syrian Air Force squadrons
- Military of Syria
- Syrian Air Force
- Transport in Syria
- Wikipedia: WikiProject Aviation/Airline destination lists: Asia#Syria
