= United States intervention in Syria =

American intervention in the Syrian civil war and conflict

- Part of Operation Inherent Resolve, the war against the Islamic State, foreign involvement in the Syrian civil war, the war on terror and the Syrian conflict (2024–present)
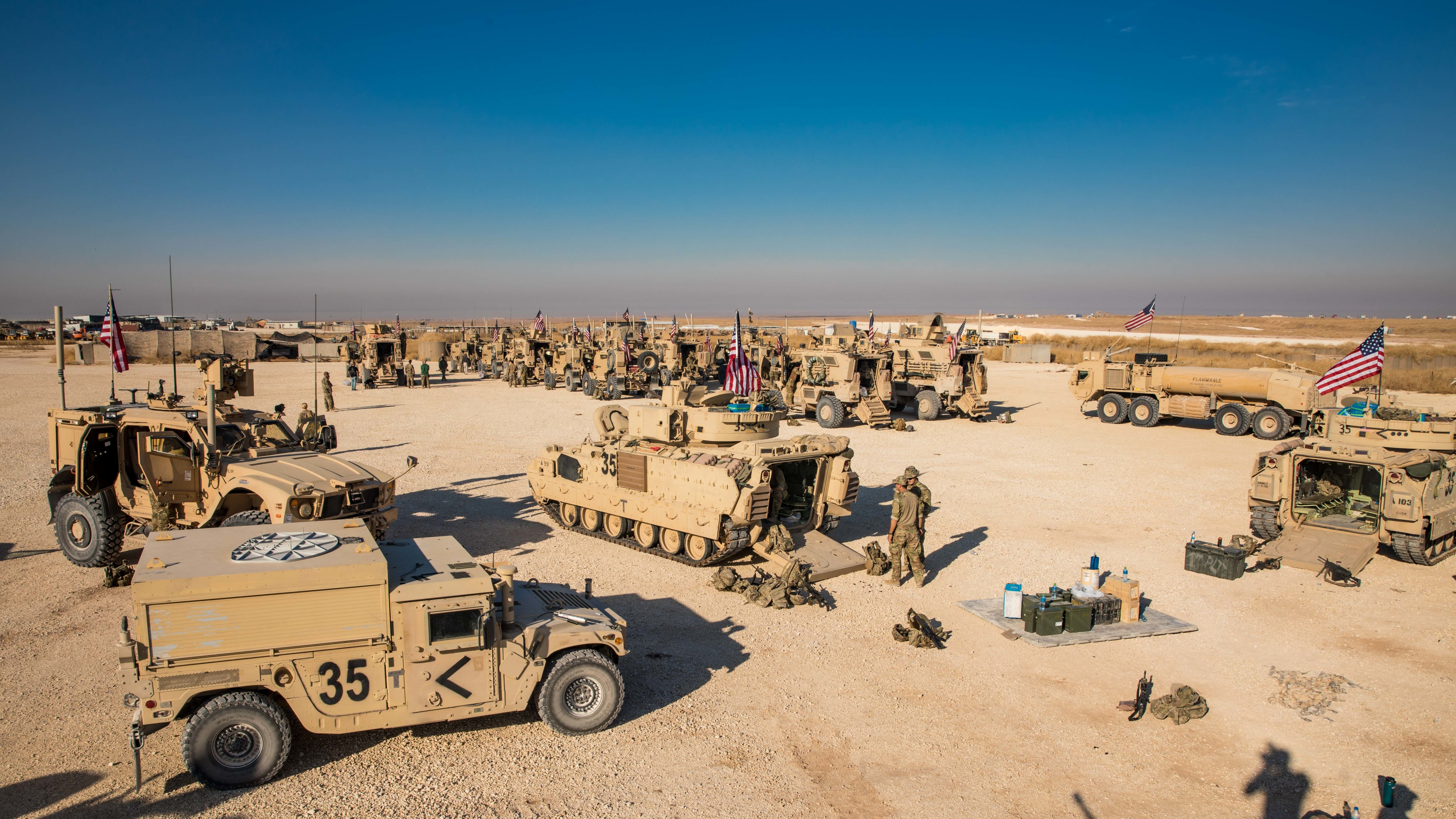
- 4th Battalion, 118th Infantry Regiment (attached to 218th MEB) at a staging area in Syria, November 2019
- Type: Military intervention
- Location: Syria
- Commanded by: President of the United States; Commander of CJTF–OIR
- Objective: Military defeat of the Islamic State; Counter-terrorism against the Islamic State, al-Qaeda and other Islamic extremist groups; Counter Iranian and Russian influence in Syria; Destroy the chemical weapon capabilities of Ba'athist Syria (2016–2017)
- Date: 22 September 2014 – 30 June 2026 (11 years, 6 months, 3 weeks and 4 days)
- Executed by: United States; CJTF–OIR coalition Local forces: Syrian Democratic Forces (Syria) Syrian Free Army
- Outcome: American victory: ISIL suffers military defeat and loses almost all of its remaining territory in March 2019; ISIL's caliphs Abu Bakr al-Baghdadi, Abu Ibrahim al-Hashimi al-Qurashi, Abu al-Hasan al-Hashimi al-Qurashi, and Ali Husayn al-Ulaywi killed by the Coalition
- Casualties: Coalition: 34 killed; Islamic State: 9,158+ killed; Pro-government forces: 192+ killed; al-Qaeda and rebels: 418 killed; 3,847 civilians killed by airstrikes

The United States officially intervened in the Syrian civil war on 22 September 2014 with the stated aim of combatting the Islamic State (ISIL/ISIS) militant organization. The intervention was part of Operation Inherent Resolve and saw the US support both anti-ISIL and anti-Assad factions, including the Syrian Armed Forces under the transitional government and the YPG-led Syrian Democratic Forces (SDF).

Shortly after the start of the civil war in 2011, the Obama administration placed new sanctions on Syria and supported the Free Syrian Army rebel faction by covertly authorizing Timber Sycamore under which the Central Intelligence Agency (CIA) armed and trained rebels. Following the Islamic State's occupation of Eastern Syria in August 2014, the United States conducted surveillance flights in Syria to gather intelligence on the group. In September 2014, the US-led coalition—which involved the United Kingdom, France, Jordan, Turkey, Canada, Australia, and others—launched an air campaign against the Islamic State and al-Nusra Front inside Syria.

The missile strike on Shayrat Airbase on 7 April 2017 was the first time the US deliberately attacked Syrian government forces during the war, with US forces proceeding to periodically attack Assad's forces and allies often in defense of either the SDF or the Syrian Free Army opposition group based in al-Tanf. In mid-January 2018, the Trump administration indicated its intention to maintain an open-ended military presence in Syria to accomplish US political objectives, including countering Iranian influence and ousting Syrian president Bashar al-Assad, however, on 19 December, President Trump unilaterally ordered the withdrawal of the 2,000–2,500 US ground troops in Syria at the time, which was to be completed in 2019. Concerns over a power vacuum resulted in the US instead leaving around 400 US troops garrisoned in Syria indefinitely, with any withdrawal being gradual and conditions-based, returning to a policy of open-ended US intervention in the country.

In 2019, the coalition saw decisive results in its intervention against the Islamic State; the terror group lost its last remaining territory in Syria during the battle of Baghuz Fawqani and its leader Abu Bakr al-Baghdadi died during a US special forces raid in Idlib in October 2019. The Trump administration ordered all US forces to withdraw from Rojava in early October ahead of a Turkish incursion into the region, a controversial move widely seen as a reneging of the US's alliance with the SDF in favor of NATO ally Turkey. However, by November 2019, US troops instead repositioned to eastern Syria, reinforcing their presence in the al-Hasakah and Deir ez-Zor governorates, with the subordinate mission of securing SDF-controlled oil and gas infrastructure from the IS insurgency and the Syrian government. On 23 November 2019, the head of US Central Command stated there was no "end date" on the US's intervention in Syria.

The US Department of Defense stated that there were around 900 US soldiers operating in Syria as of February 2021. On 19 December 2024, after the fall of the Assad regime, the Pentagon revealed that there were around 2,000 US troops in Syria, adding that the increase was temporary and occurred in recent months. However, the U.S. military continued to withdraw in 2025, leaving less than 1,000 troops to work with allies to fight the Islamic State militants. In February 2026, U.S. President Donald Trump ordered the complete withdrawal of American forces from Syria within the next two months. American forces completed their withdrawal on 16 April 2026, when US troops evacuated the Qasrak base in the Hasakah region, marking the end of more than a decade of American military presence in Syria. However, the conflict briefly continued about two months later when on June 19 the United States conducted an airstrike in Syria killing ISIS leader Ali Husayn al-Ulaywi, in a single post withdrawal strike.

== Background ==
Leaked United States diplomatic cables have been seen as showing that regime change in Syria may have been a covert foreign policy goal of the US government in the years leading up to the civil war, even during the period when President Barack Obama was publicly engaging with Syrian president Bashar al-Assad. A 2006 memorandum by US diplomat William Roebuck of the embassy in Damascus stated:

We believe Bashar's weaknesses are in how he chooses to react to looming issues, both perceived and real, such as...the potential threat to the regime from the increasing presence of transiting Islamist extremists. This cable summarizes our assessment of these vulnerabilities and suggests that there may be actions, statements and signals that the USG can send that will improve the likelihood of such opportunities arising. These proposals will need to be fleshed out and converted into real actions and we need to be ready to move quickly to take advantage of such opportunities. Many of our suggestions underline using Public Diplomacy and more indirect means to send messages that influence the inner circle.

According to Seymour Hersh and activist Robert Naiman, Roebuck, who went on to be charge d'affairs of the Libyan embassy under Obama, also considered the advantages of promoting religious sectarianism in Syria.

Following the start of the Arab Spring in 2011, protests in Syria against the Assad regime were violently suppressed and a civil war began. By 2012 there were several armed opposition groups operating in the country, including the Free Syrian Army, formed in July 2011 by officers who defected from the Syrian Armed Forces. In 2012, the al-Nusra Front, led by Abu Muhammad al-Julani, was established by the Islamic State of Iraq (ISI) as the official branch of al-Qaeda in Syria. The al-Nusra Front was eclipsed by its own creator, and al-Qaeda severed its ties to the Islamic State of Iraq and the Levant in February 2014, after an eight-month power struggle. Despite clear connections between ISI and the al-Nusra Front, the two organisations never merged during the Syrian Civil War, as al-Julani refused to cede control to ISI and insisted on maintaining al-Nusra Front as a separate entity.

Shortly after the civil war broke out in 2011, the US initially supplied the rebels of the Free Syrian Army with non-lethal aid (e.g., food rations and pickup trucks), but quickly began providing training, money, and intelligence to selected Syrian rebel commanders. At least two US programs attempted to assist the Syrian rebels, including a 2014 Pentagon program that planned to train and equip 15,000 rebels to fight the IS, which was canceled in 2015 after spending $500 million and producing only a few dozen fighters. A simultaneous $1 billion covert program called Timber Sycamore conducted by the Central Intelligence Agency (CIA) aimed at fighting Syrian President Bashar al-Assad was more successful, but was decimated by Russian bombing, and canceled in mid-2017 by the Trump administration. The Obama administration began surveillance missions on Islamic State positions in Syria in September 2014. On 22 September 2014, the US, Bahrain, Jordan, Qatar, Saudi Arabia, and the United Arab Emirates (UAE) began to attack ISIL forces inside Syria, as well as the Khorasan group in the Idlib Governorate west of Aleppo, and the al-Nusra Front around Raqqa, as part of the international military intervention against ISIL.

=== Timber Sycamore and Syrian Train and Equip Program ===
At the direction of US President Barack Obama, the Central Intelligence Agency (CIA) was put in charge of operations worth about $1 billion annually to arm anti-government forces in Syria, an operation which formally began in 2013, more than two years after the start of the civil war in 2011. Prior to 2013, the CIA only supplied certain rebel groups of the Free Syrian Army with non-lethal aid, but later began providing training, funding, and intelligence to selected rebel commanders. Although a former intelligence adviser who spoke to journalist Seymour Hersh claimed the CIA had been facilitating the flow of arms from Libya to Syria in collaboration with "the UK [United Kingdom], Saudi Arabia and Qatar" since 2012 or 2011, the first confirmed CIA weapons arrived in Spring 2014: "There were just a handful, delivered to only one rebel group carefully vetted by the CIA". The group, Harakat Hazm, or the Steadfast Movement, showed off the new weapons system by posting the first successful strike on YouTube in April. Another of the groups being vetted was the Islamist Army of Mujahedeen, formed in January 2014 specifically to combat ISIL. However, there were indications that the Army of Mujahedeen was still being vetted in September 2014.

In addition to the covert CIA program, on 17 September 2014, the US House of Representatives voted to authorize the executive branch to overtly train and equip Syrian rebels against ISIL forces, at a cost of $500 million.

=== July 2014 rescue mission ===
Following the abduction of a number of foreigners in Syria, on 4 July 2014, the US carried out an operation to rescue foreign hostages being held by ISIL. US airstrikes were conducted against an ISIL military base known as the "Osama bin Laden Camp" while at the same time, two dozen US special forces soldiers dropped from helicopters near an ISIL-held building, thought to be for high-value prisoners. No prisoners were found in the building and the soldiers were quickly engaged by ISIL forces dispatched from Raqqa, which started a three-hour firefight. US forces concluded that the hostages were no longer at the site and abandoned the rescue attempt. At least five ISIL fighters were killed and one US soldier was wounded. Jordanian forces were also reportedly involved in the operation, with one Jordanian soldier reportedly wounded, but Jordanian involvement was not confirmed. Later on, it was reported that the hostages had been moved 24 hours before the attempted rescue. Following the mission, it remained unclear whether the operation failed due to bad intelligence or whether ISIL forces were alerted in advance of the mission.

In the aftermath of the rescue mission, and purportedly as a response to airstrikes in Iraq, ISIL beheaded three hostages over a one-month period: Americans James Foley and Steven Sotloff on 19 August and 2 September, respectively, and Briton David Haines on 13 September.

=== Surveillance flights over Syria ===
On 26 August 2014, the US began conducting overt surveillance flights, including drones, over Syria to gather intelligence on ISIL targets, collecting information that would aid future airstrikes, even though airstrikes were not yet authorized at that point. No approval was sought from the Assad government for flights entering Syrian airspace.

== US-led coalition against ISIL ==
In June 2014, the Iraqi government formally requested the United States to assist in its struggle against ISIL, following the group's offensive in northern Iraq that same month. Since then, the US led efforts to establish a global coalition to counter ISIL.

In response to this request, various sets of countries convened on 15 September and 3 December 2014, to discuss concerted action against ISIL. Present at all three meetings were the United States, United Kingdom, France, Germany, Italy, Canada, Turkey and Denmark.

The coalition of 5 September (10 countries) decided to support anti-ISIL forces in Iraq and Syria. On 10 September 2014, US president Barack Obama announced a "comprehensive" strategy to counter ISIL that "in concert with coalition partners [...] will defeat ISIL and deny them safe haven".

The coalition of 3 December 2014 (sixty countries) that styled itself as the Global Coalition to Counter the Islamic State of Iraq and the Levant (ISIL) agreed on a many-sided strategy against ISIL, including cutting off ISIL's financing and funding and exposing ISIL's true nature. As of March 2015, the US-led coalition comprised over sixty countries, that contributed in various ways to the effort.

=== Support for Kurdish-led ground forces ===
As the Siege of Kobanî continued there were growing calls to also arm the YPG, also known as the People's Protection Units, a Kurdish fighting force in Syria heavily involved in the defense of Kobanî. On 20 October 2014, the Turkish foreign minister, Mevlüt Çavuşoğlu announced that the Turkish government would be allowing Peshmerga from the Iraqi Kurdistan Regional Government to cross their border into Kobanî to support Kurdish fighters. The change in policy came after the Turkish government had refused to allow Kurdish fighters and supplies to pass through the border to YPG units in Kobanî, as it viewed the YPG as an offshoot of the PKK. On 28 October, Peshmerga from the Iraqi Kurdistan Regional Government departed Erbil to travel to Turkey and eventually to Kobanî. A total of 152 soldiers were deployed starting with forty vehicles carrying weapons, artillery, and machine guns, along with 80 Peshmerga forces, who crossed the border into Turkey by land with the heavy weapons and then drove to the border near Kobanî. The other 72 soldiers in the contingent flew to Turkey and rejoined the rest of the contingent on 29 October. By the start of November, 152 Kurdish Peshmerga from Iraq and 50 Free Syrian Army fighters had crossed the border into Kobanî with heavy weapons, small arms, and ammunition.

On 20 October 2014, the United States began airdropping supplies to Syrian Kurdish forces, including the YPG, that were besieging ISIL-controlled Kobanî. Prior to 20 October, the United States and its anti-ISIL coalition partners in Syria had not provided any supplies to Kurdish forces in their fight against the jihadist group. Much of the reason for the US airdropping supplies was due to the Turkish government's refusal to allow supplies to pass through their border into Kobanî. The US specifically airdropped weapons, ammunition, and medical supplies supplied by Iraqi Kurdistan intended to supply the Kurdish forces in Syria. On 21 October, a video was released by ISIL showing what it claimed was a bundle of airdropped small arms, ammunition, and other supplies from the United States. The Pentagon said it was analyzing the video and could not at the time confirm whether the video was authentic but that the materials were similar; the video would subsequently be analyzed by the Department of Defense to verify its authenticity. On 22 October, the Pentagon confirmed that one of its airdrops had been intercepted by ISIL elements but downplayed the incident, saying that it most likely would not give ISIL any real advantage in their overall operations.

On 8 December 2024, following the end of the Assad regime and takeover by the SDF and Syrian opposition, the United States Central Command announced renewed operations and air strikes against ISIL cells and targets within Syria. US President Joe Biden called the regime change as a "moment of risk", and clarified that the operations were to ensure that ISIL did not take advantage of the circumstances.

=== Coalition arming and training of the Syrian opposition ===
In October 2014, the Turkish government agreed to help train and equip some moderate Syrian rebels in Turkey. By January 2015, the United States was set to send 400 troops and hundreds of support staff to countries neighboring Syria in order to train 5,000 opposition soldiers a year for the next three years. The countries taking part in the train-and-equip program were to include Jordan, Qatar and Saudi Arabia, as well as Turkey. The groups that were expected to be armed and trained by the US government included fighters from the Free Syrian Army. The Pentagon confirmed that it had selected 1,200 Syrian opposition members to begin training in March 2015, with 3,000 to complete training by the end of 2015.

The successful experience in Kobanî had informed US policy in regard to arming Syrian opposition groups other than the Kurdish YPG, with plans to give other groups technicals equipped with radio and GPS equipment to call in airstrikes. John R. Allen, President Obama's envoy to the international coalition against ISIL, stated "It is clearly part of our plan, that not only we will train them, and we will equip them with the latest weapons systems, but we will also protect them when the time comes". In March 2015, the United Kingdom announced that it was sending around 75 military instructors to train Syrian opposition forces. The train-and-equip program started on 9 May 2015. On 25 May, Turkey and the US agreed "in principle" on the necessity to support these forces with air support.

However, only about 200 rebel fighters actually began training, the majority of whom left after being required to agree to fight only against ISIL and not the Assad government. By mid-2015, only a group of 54 such fighters (Division 30) had been deployed—which was quickly routed in an ambush by al-Nusra—and a further 100 had been thus far finished training in Jordan. In September 2015, it was reported that a further 100-120 were being trained in a second wave, with 75 more Division 30 fighters reported to have re-entered Syria at the end of the month; they were immediately attacked by al-Nusra.

Jane's Defence Weekly reported that in December 2015 the US shipped 994 tonnes of weapons and ammunition (including packaging and container weight), generally of Soviet-type equipment from Eastern Europe, to Syrian rebel groups under the ongoing CIA Timber Sycamore operation. A detailed list of weapon types and shipment weights had been obtained from the US government's Federal Business Opportunities website. As of July 2016, extensive arms shipments were continuing.

It was reported in July 2017 that the Donald Trump administration decided to "phase-out" the CIA program to equip and train anti-government rebel groups.

== Multinational air war ==
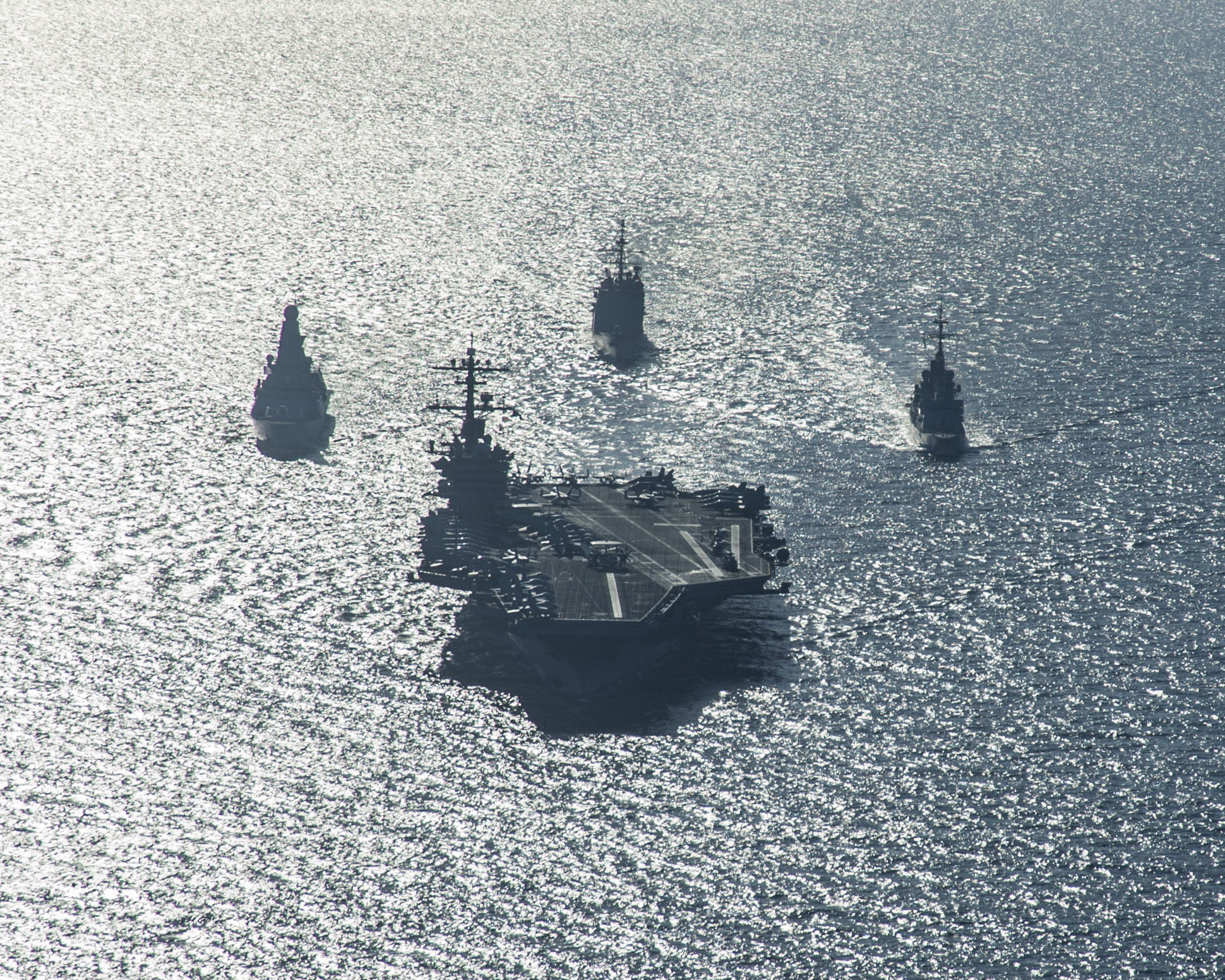
USS Carl Vinson and support ships deployed for combat operations in Syria and Iraq, 2014

=== Contributing countries ===
- Australia (Operation Okra) – Airstrikes ended December 2017. Concluded December 2024.
- Bahrain – Ended in 2016
- Belgium – Ended in 2017
- Canada (Operation Impact § In Syria) – Airstrikes ended February 2016
- France (Opération Chammal)
- Germany (Operation Counter Daesh) – Operations in Syria ended January 2022
- Netherlands (Dutch military intervention against ISIL and Dutch involvement in the Syrian civil war) – Airstrikes in Syria began January 2016; anti-ISIL operations ended January 2019
- Jordan (Jordanian intervention in the Syrian civil war) – Airstrikes partially ended in July 2018
- Qatar (Qatari involvement in the Syrian civil war)
- Saudi Arabia (Saudi Arabian involvement in the Syrian civil war) – Involvement ended in 2018
- Turkey (Turkish involvement in the Syrian civil war and Turkey–Islamic State conflict)
- United Arab Emirates – Involvement ended in 2018
- United Kingdom (Operation Shader § Intervention in Syria)
- United States (Leader) (Operation Inherent Resolve)

=== US airstrikes ===
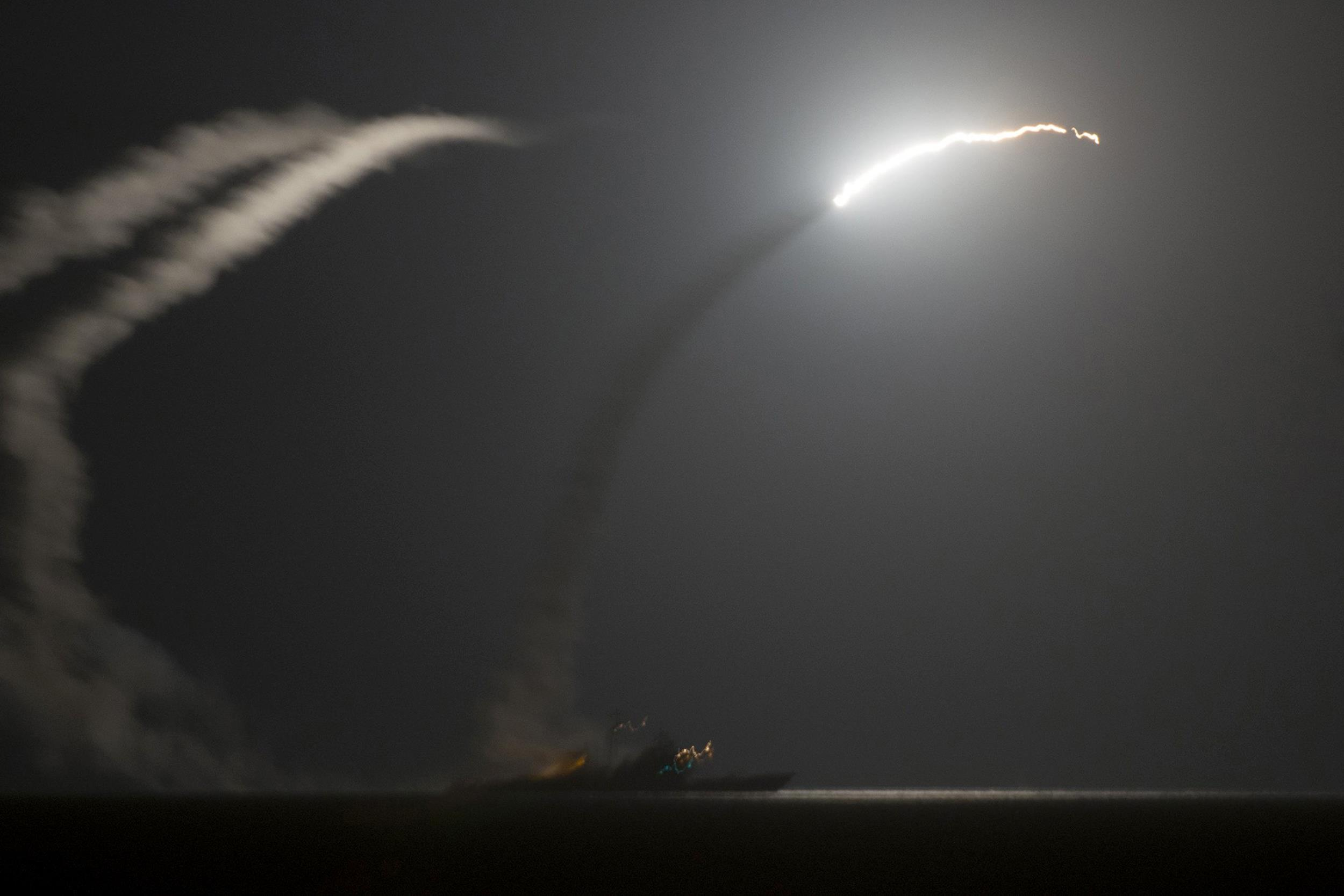
Tomahawk missiles being fired from the warships USS Philippine Sea and USS Arleigh Burke at ISIL targets in the city of Raqqa

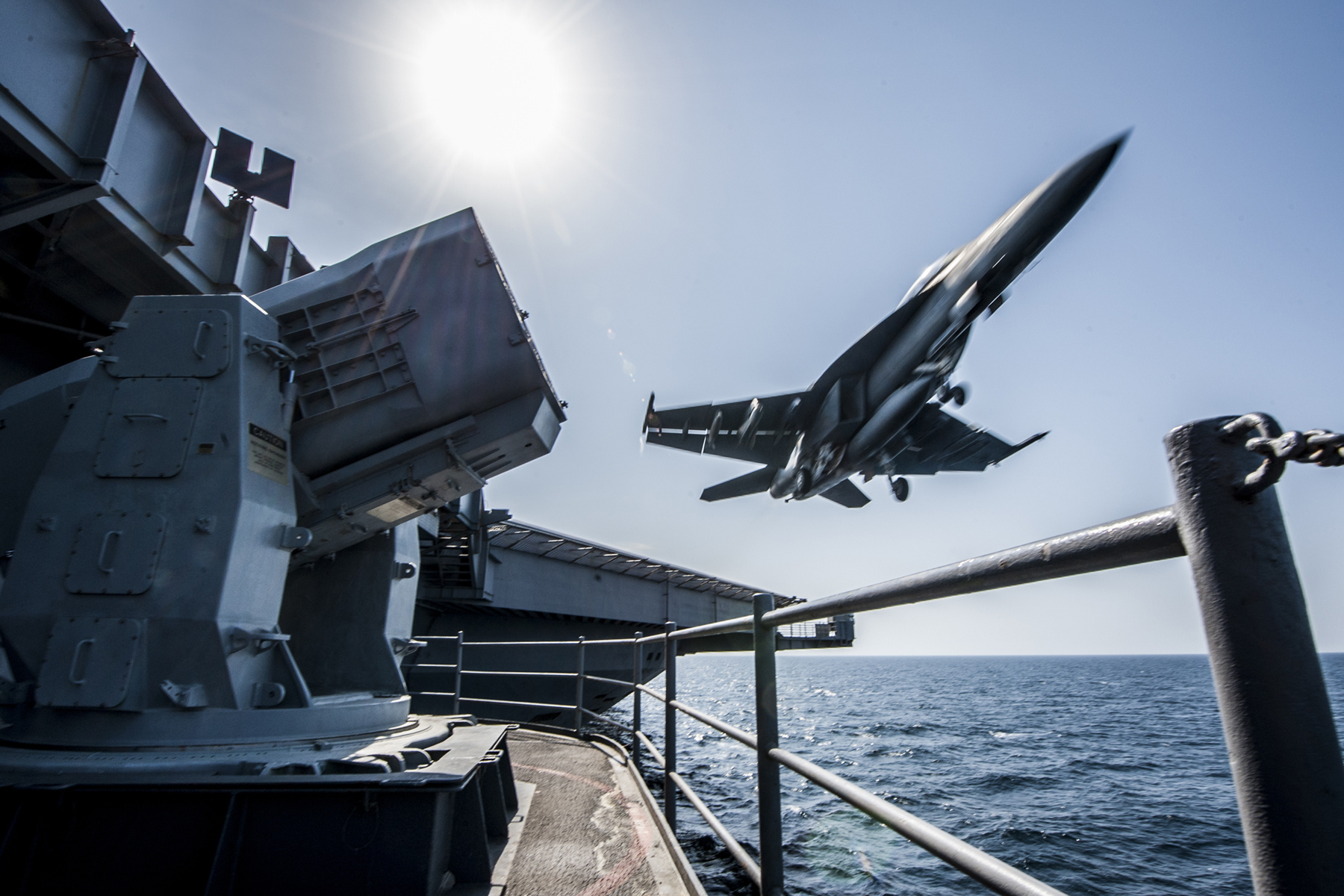
An F/A-18 Super Hornet taking off from USS Carl Vinson before carrying out strikes on ISIL targets in Syria

In his address to the nation on 10 September 2014, US President Obama announced his intention to bomb ISIL targets in Syria and called on Congress to authorize a program to train and arm rebels who were fighting ISIL and the Syrian forces of Bashar al-Assad. For the first time, he authorized direct attacks against the militant group in Syria. In his address, he said the United States were going on offensive, launching "a steady, relentless effort to take out" the group "wherever they exist." Obama also announced creating of a broader coalition against ISIL.

Commenting on Obama's address, Russian Foreign Ministry spokesman Alexander Lukashevich opposed the US intervention against ISIL in Syria "without the consent of the legitimate government" and said that "this step, in the absence of a UN Security Council decision, would be an act of aggression, a gross violation of international law". Ali Haidar, Syrian minister of national reconciliation, said that "any action of any kind without the consent of the Syrian government would be an attack on Syria".

On 17 September, the US House of Representatives approved Obama's plan to train and arm the Syrian rebels in their fight against ISIL. In a statement following the House vote, Obama said that the United States would not send military troops to Syria. The Senate gave final congressional approval to Obama's proposal the next day.

The US did not request permission from the Syrian government, nor did it coordinate its actions with the Syrian government, provide direct notification to the Syrian military or give indication of timing on specific targets, but it did notify the Syrian U.N. representative, which the Syrian government confirmed.

Before the airstrikes began, the United States also informed Iran, the Assad government's largest regional ally, of their intention to launch airstrikes. It did not share specific timing or targets of strikes with the Iranian government but reportedly assured it that the US would not strike any Syrian government targets.

On 8 April 2018, US President Donald Trump called Syrian President Bashar Al-Assad "Animal Assad", following suspected chemical attack carried out in the Syrian city of Douma. On 14 April, the United States, France, and the United Kingdom carried out missile strikes against Syria. On 30 May, President Al-Assad responded to the insult, by saying: "What you say is what you are."

It was reported in June 2018 that the 441st Air Expeditionary Squadron reportedly maintained an unpaved runway in Sarrin, Raqqa Governorate.

On 14 June 2020, a US coalition drone strike killed Guardians of Religion Organization leaders Khalid al-Aruri and Bilal al-Sanaani who were driving a vehicle in Idlib. There was reportedly no explosion and the target vehicle was relatively intact, with the roof and windshield impacted from above and one side shredded, leading observers to suggest the munition used was probably the kinetic Hellfire R9X missile that uses blades to eviscerate its target rather than an explosive warhead. On 24 June, Abu Adnan al-Homsi, logistics and equipment commander at the Guardians of Religion Organization, was also killed by a US drone strike.

On 25 February 2021, US military airstrikes commanded by US president Joe Biden destroyed multiple facilities related to pro-Iranian militias including Kata'ib Hezbollah and Kata'ib Sayyid al-Shuhada, at a border control point near al-Hurri village, Abu Kamal District, in retaliation to Erbil missile attacks. At least 17 militants were reported killed in the strikes, although the militias only confirmed one. The strikes were conducted by two F15s dropping Joint Direct Attack Munitions (JDAM) and was the first overt military operation ordered by the Biden administration.

On 28 June 2021, the US military conducted airstrikes on facilities purportedly used by Iranian-supported militias near the Iraq–Syria border. However, the SOHR stated that at least nine Iran-backed Iraqi militia fighters died, and many others were injured.

==== Airstrikes on the Khorasan Group ====
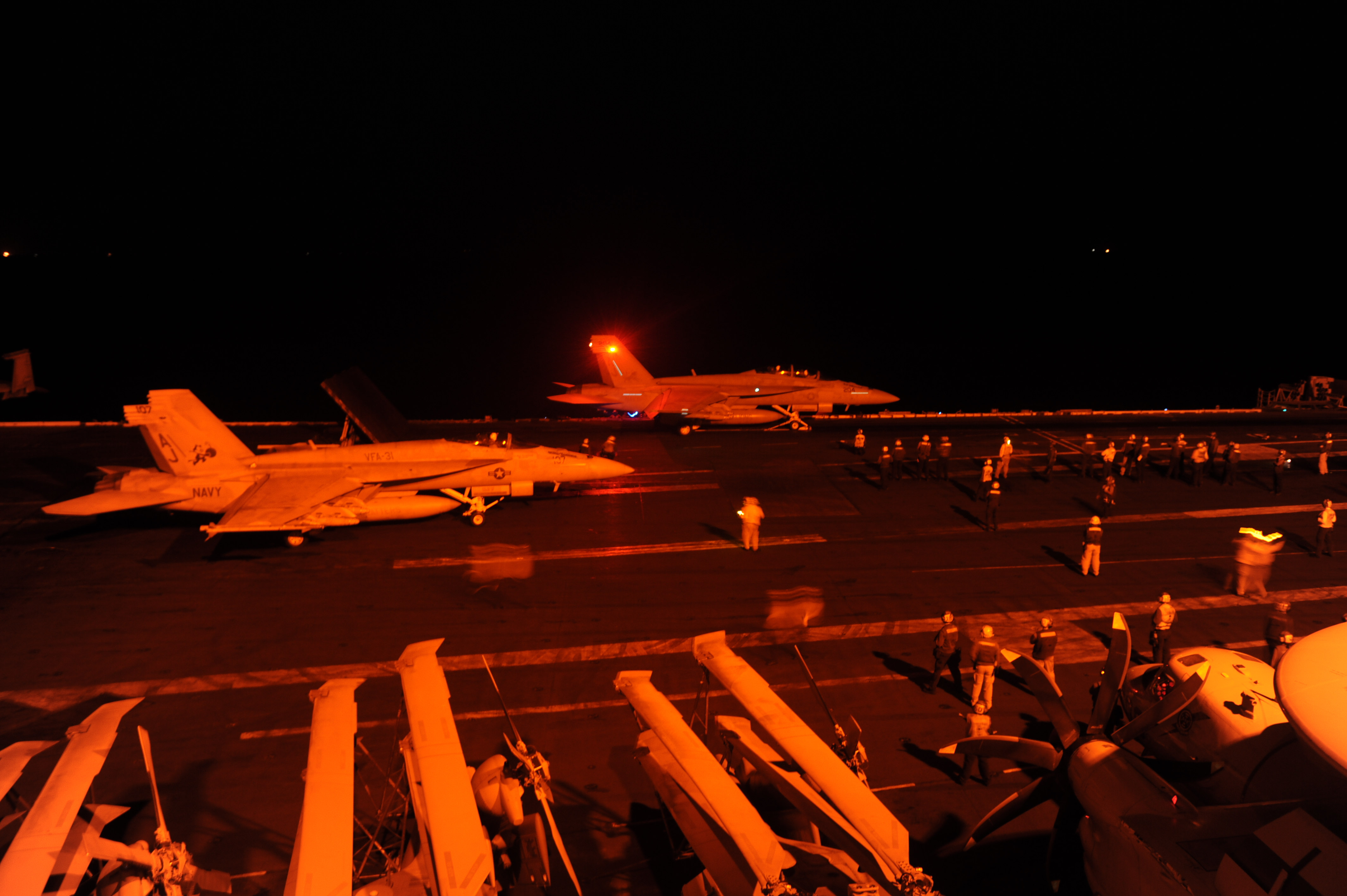
F/A-18 Hornets take off from USS George H.W. Bush to strike ISIL targets in Syria, 2014

One of the groups targeted by US airstrikes was the Khorasan Group, an extremist group of suspected al-Qaeda "core" members who were alleged to have been plotting an attack against the US and other Western nations. The strikes targeted Khorasan training camps, explosives and munitions production facilities, communications facilities, as well as command and control facilities. The group has been claimed to possess advanced bomb making skills and their plot is claimed to involve a bomb made of a nonmetallic device such as a toothpaste container or clothes dipped in explosive material. The group is reportedly led by Muhsin al-Fadhli, a leader of al-Qaeda and a close confidant of Osama bin Laden. Intelligence officials expressed concern that the group may include militants who were taught by Ibrahim al-Asiri, the chief bomb maker for al-Qaeda in the Arabian Peninsula, who is known for his sophisticated bomb making techniques that nearly downed two Western airliners.

Later statements by government officials indicated that the threat of a plot may have been less severe than initially reported. One official indicated that "there did not yet seem to be a concrete plan in the works", while another told The Guardian that "there was no indication of an imminent domestic threat from the group" at the time the United States began bombing.

On 6 November, a second round of airstrikes was launched against Khorasan and al-Nusra in northwestern Syria, along with Ahrar ash-Sham at its headquarters in Idlib, whose leadership had been infiltrated by al-Qaeda. On 13 November 2014, the US launched a third set of airstrikes against Khorasan. On 19 November, the US carried out another airstrike on Khorasan near Hazm, which struck and destroyed a storage facility associated with the group. On 1 December, the US carried out another airstrike on Khorasan near Aleppo.

On 24 March 2015, it was revealed that the US airstrikes on Khorasan had killed 17 militants from the group. On 8 July 2015, a US airstrike near the town of Sarmada in Idlib, Syria, killed Muhsin al-Fadhli, the leader of Khorasan. In October 2015, a further U.S. airstrike killed another senior Khorasan Group leader, Sanafi al-Nasr, in northwestern Syria, the fifth prominent member of the network eliminated by U.S. strikes that year.

== Ground operations ==
Initially, coalition leaders, including US President Obama, said their ground forces would not be used in the fight against ISIL either in Iraq or Syria unless they were local coalition forces. In Iraq, thousands of coalition troops from the US and other nations had been deployed in an advisory capacity; in Syria no ground troops from the coalition were deployed in the beginning of the intervention.

=== 2015–16 ===
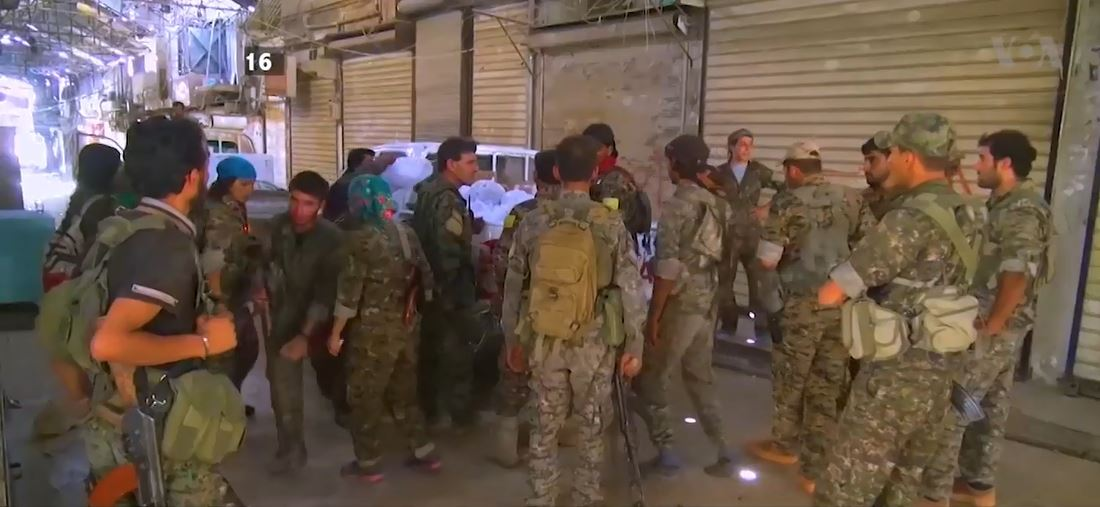
US-backed Syrian Democratic Forces fighters in Manbij, 2016

In November 2015, the Obama administration began the deployment of US special forces to Syria, with the mission of assisting rebel forces in their fight against ISIL, President Obama then ordered several dozen Special Operations troops into Rojava in northern Syria to assist local fighters battling ISIL, authorizing the first open-ended mission by American ground forces into the country.

ISIL's deputy leader in Syria, Abu Ali al-Anbari, was killed by JSOC special forces operatives in March 2016, in eastern Syria near the Syrian–Iraqi border, while he and three other ISIL members were traveling in a vehicle coming from Raqqa. The US Special Forces ordered him to exit the vehicle, intending to arrest him. When he refused and pulled out an assault rifle instead, US forces fired at the vehicle, killing him and the other passengers on board. US commandos also seized electronics and other documents during the operation for intelligence purposes.

In March 2016, King Abdullah of Jordan said that British forces had helped in the building up of a mechanized battalion in southern Syria, consisting of tribal fighters to combat the Syrian Army.

On 17 March 2016, the day after the declaration of the Federation of Northern Syria, US Defense Secretary Ashton Carter praised the Syrian Democratic Forces as having "proven to be excellent partners of ours on the ground in fighting ISIL. We are grateful for that, and we intend to continue to do that, recognizing the complexities of their regional role."

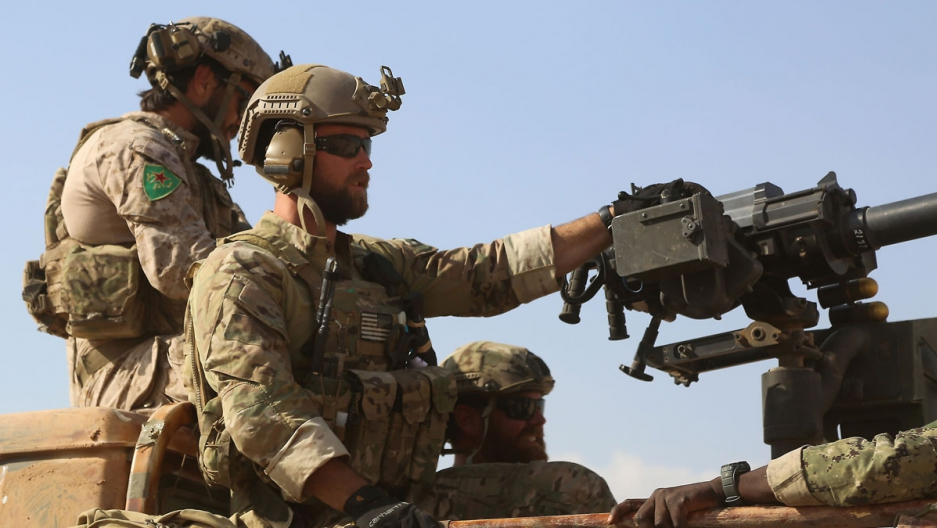
US Army Special Forces in Raqqa, May 2016; one is wearing a Kurdish YPJ patch

During the SDF's May 2016 offensive against ISIL in Northern Raqqa, US Special Forces were widely reported and photographed to be present, with some of them wearing badges of the Kurdish YPG and YPJ on their uniforms. On 21 May, Joseph Votel, commanding general of US Central Command, completed a secret hours-long trip to northern Syria to visit several locations where there were US special operations forces and meet with local forces the US was helping train to fight ISIL. The visit came as the first of 250 additional US special operations forces were beginning to arrive in Syria to work with local forces. The commander overseeing the war in Syria, at the end of a long Saturday spent touring SDF bases, said "We do, absolutely, have to go with what we've got".

In September 2016, the US spokesman for the Combined Joint Task Force – Operation Inherent Resolve (CJTF–OIR) confirmed that the SDF, including the YPG, is also part of the "vetted forces" in the train and equip program and would be supplied with weapons. The President of Turkey, Recep Tayyip Erdoğan, condemned this and claimed that the SDF are "endangering our future".

In October 2016, US Army Lt. Gen. Stephen J. Townsend, the commander of the international coalition against ISIL, said that the SDF would lead the impending assault on Raqqa, ISIL's then-stronghold and capital, and that SDF commanders would plan the operation with advice from American and coalition troops. From November 2016, more than 300 US Special Operations Forces were embedded to train and advise SDF fighters in the Raqqa offensive.

=== 2017–18 ===
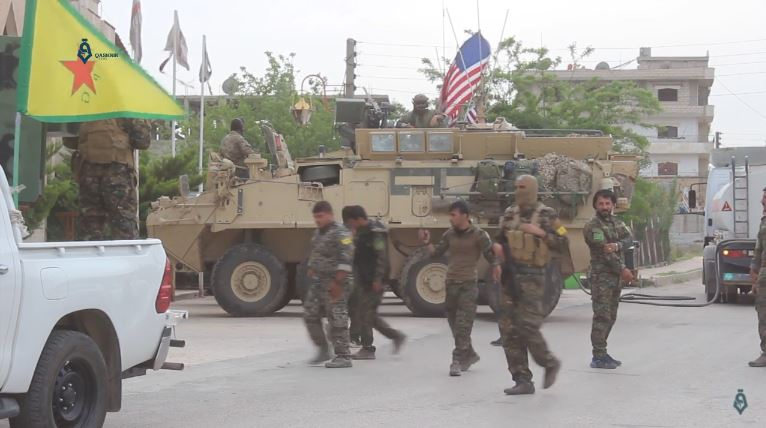
Kurdish troops and US armored vehicle in Al-Hasakah, May 2017

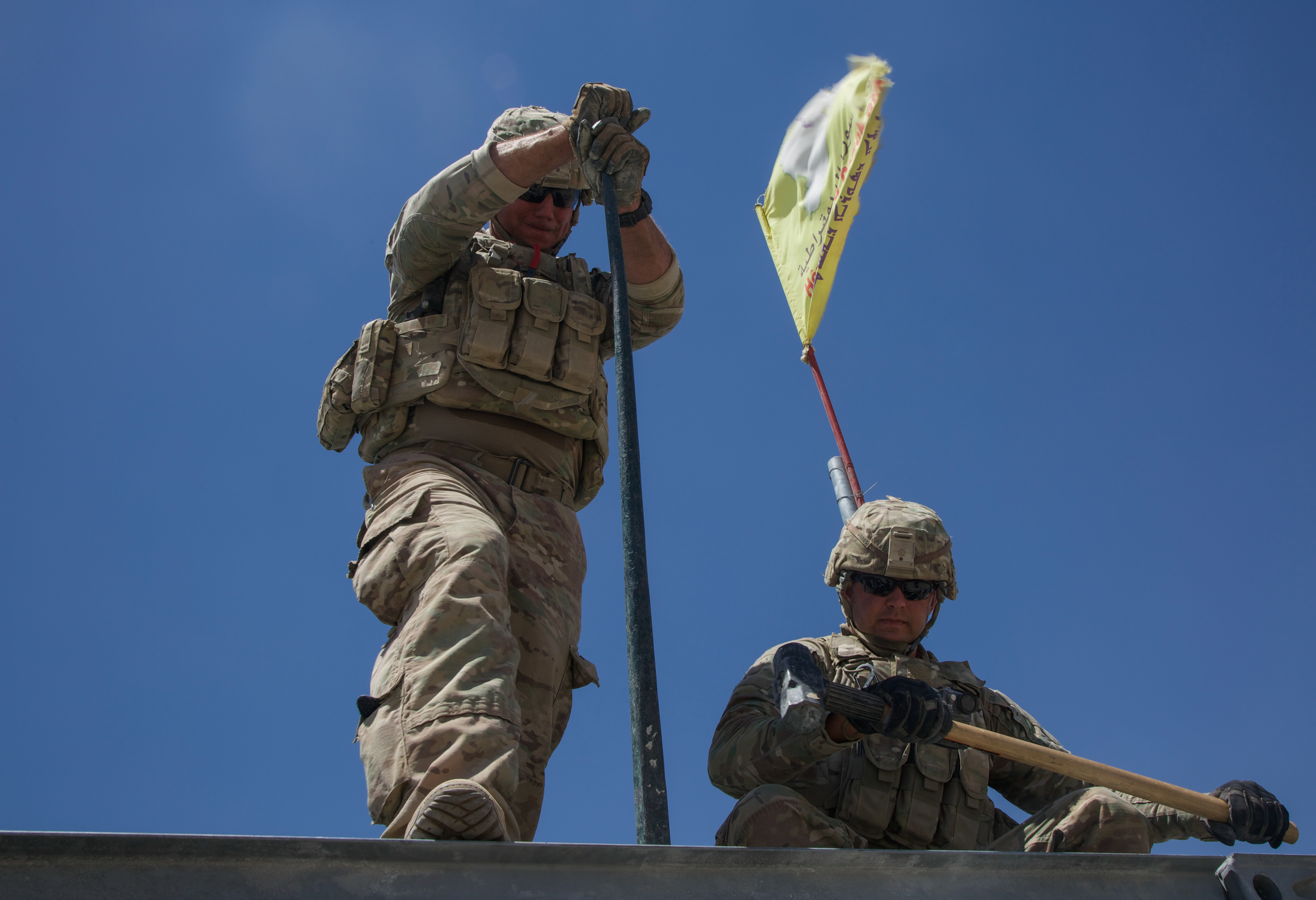
US Army 310th Engineer Company maintaining a Mabey Logistic Support Bridge during the Battle of Raqqa, 29 July 2017

US Marines and Army Special Forces operating in support of the SDF in Syria, October 2018

In March 2017, the Trump administration deployed an additional 400 US Marines to Syria to expand the fight against ISIL in the Raqqa offensive where they could provide artillery support for US-backed local forces that were preparing an assault on Raqqa to liberate the city from IS militants. The deployment marked a new escalation in the US's war in Syria, and put more conventional US troops in the battle that, until then, had primarily used Special Operations units. The 400 Marines were part of the 11th MEU from the Battalion Landing Team 1st Battalion, 4th Marines. They manned an artillery battery of M-777 Howitzers whilst additional infantrymen from the unit provided security; resupplies were handled by part of the expeditionary force's combat logistics element. During the Raqqa campaign alone, this small artillery battalion fired over 40,000 shells (including 34,033 155 mm), more than were used in the entire 2003 invasion of Iraq and only 20,000 fewer than all those fired by the US military in Operation Desert Storm.

In March 2018, SDF press secretary in Deir ez-Zor Mehdi Kobani reportedly told Sputnik Turkiye that US forces were building a "large military base" in the oil-rich al-Omar region of Deir ez-Zor as new equipment had been reportedly arriving to US bases in Syria. The al-Omar oilfield is the largest oil deposit in Syria, and was captured by the SDF during their campaign against ISIL in October 2017.

=== 2019 drawdown of US ground forces ===
On 19 December 2018, President Donald Trump announced that he ordered the pullout of all 2,000–2,500 US troops operating in Syria, though no clear timetable was given. A day later, after failing to convince Trump to reconsider his decision to withdraw all American troops from Syria, Jim Mattis announced his resignation as Secretary of Defense. On 3 January 2019, Trump described Syria as "sand and death" in defense of troop withdrawal. US operations in al-Tanf would continue indefinitely.

On 16 January 2019, a suicide bombing claimed by ISIL in the SDF-controlled town of Manbij killed four US personnel and injured three servicemen, making it the deadliest attack on Coalition forces in the country since the intervention. The ISIL attack drew a second round of criticism of the US president's withdrawal order, with critics linking the attack with an emboldening of ISIL terror and insurgent tactics due to the announcement of a US pullout, despite the group's continued loss of territory in Syria. President Trump offered condolences to the families of the slain American citizens on 17 January while he reaffirmed his policy of withdrawing troops. Trump paid tribute to the fallen Americans during a trip to Dover Air Force Base in the US state of Delaware on 19 January, where their remains were received.

On 21 January, an ISIL SVBIED targeted a US convoy accompanied by SDF troops on the Shadadi-Al-Hasakah road in Al-Hasakah province, killing five SDF personnel. Witnesses said the SVBIED rammed into an SDF vehicle by a checkpoint held by Kurdish forces a dozen kilometers outside Shadadi as the US convoy drove past. No Americans were harmed.

CNN reported on 24 January that additional US troops were moved to Syria to help provide security for the pullout of equipment and personnel as they are moved out via air and land routes. US Department of Defense officials said the additional security forces would move around Syria to different locations as needed and may move in and out of the country at times. Troop numbers would also fluctuate as American presence gradually declines. Defense officials declined to give specifics on numbers, locations, or timetables, citing security concerns. Local sources reported to Anadolu Agency on 28 January that around 600 US troops had allegedly entered eastern Syria from western Iraq to help with the withdrawal process, arriving at discreet bases in Harab Isk and Sarrin villages set to be used as main evacuation centers during the withdrawal. The news agency added that the American-controlled airfields in Rmeilan and Tell Beydar would be used to airlift heavy weapons and equipment from the country; the Coalition itself did not confirm these reports.

By the end of January 2019, according to two US officials, more than 10 percent of American equipment and supplies had been removed from Syria, with 3,000 additional personnel brought into the country to facilitate the draw-down of forces. By 9 February, hundreds of US airstrikes and ground support for the SDF continued as the Kurdish-led force began its final assault on the last ISIL holdouts trapped in a small cluster of hamlets in eastern Syria (including Al-Baghuz Fawqani and southern Al-Marashidah) no larger than a few square miles. US officials, including President Donald Trump, believed the SDF would be able to defeat the remaining diehard ISIL fighters "in days", bringing an end to ISIL's claim of a territorial caliphate.

On 18 February, Commander-in-Chief of the SDF Mazlum Kobane expressed hopes the US would halt its total pullout. Kobane said there were discussions about perhaps French and British troops supporting them, but demanded 1,000–1,500 US troops stay in Syria to provide "air cover, air support and a force on the ground" to help the SDF in its ongoing fight against ISIL. CENTCOM commander Gen. Joseph Votel reiterated the US withdrawal was continuing.

With the general withdrawal continuing, the White House announced late on 21 February that 200 residual US troops would remain in Syria as a "peacekeeping force". The peacekeeping deployment would be indefinite. The next day it was revealed the actual number was 400 troops, not 200, as half would be based in Rojava and half at al-Tanf. Officials stated it was a part of an initiative to get NATO allies to commit to a multinational observer force that would establish a "safe zone" in Rojava to keep the Kurds and Turks from clashing, to prevent pro-Syrian government forces from attacking the Kurds, and to keep up pressure to prevent an ISIL resurgence. The US was not seeking a United Nations mandate for the deployment and did not envision asking NATO to sponsor the mission, an administration official said at the time, adding that the troops would not technically be "peacekeepers," a term that carries restricted rules of engagement.

On 7 March, Gen. Joseph Votel confirmed that US forces were in no rush to pullout by a specific date, instead saying the completion of the withdrawal was conditional on ISIL no longer posing a security threat to US forces and their allies. By late March, the US continued to stretch the timetable for the pullout. On 29 March, US officials reportedly said the Pentagon's latest plans called for cutting its combat force in northeastern Syria roughly in half by early May 2019, or to about 1,000 troops, and would then pause pullout operations. The military would then reduce the number of forces every six months, depending on conditions on the ground, until it reaches the 400 troops previously approved by the president. Under this plan, the lowest troop numbers would not be reached until autumn 2020. The longer timetable would provide the US more time to negotiate and work out details over the planned multinational safe zone along Turkey's border. Officials cautioned that the timetable was open-ended and still subject to change, with factors ranging from allied troop contributions to new orders from the president himself.

In early May, video emerged online of US forces firing upon an alleged Syrian government barge ferrying oil supplies in the Middle Euphrates River Valley. The video was posted on Facebook by the pro-SDF "Deir Ezzor Media Center".

==== Withdrawal from north Syria ====
Following the collapse of the August–October 2019 Northern Syria Buffer Zone agreement and subsequent Turkish offensive against the SDF, US ground forces began deliberately withdrawing from many of their bases, outposts, and camps in north Syria around 6 October, including Manbij and the Lafarge cement factory in Jalabiya, upon "precipitous" orders from the Donald Trump administration. Senior US military officials said that troops abandoned bases as far south as Tabqah and Raqqa and consolidated all personnel and essential equipment near Kobanî to await airlifts and convoys out of the country throughout coming weeks. A US official at the time said the ≈1,000 US troops being withdrawn will mostly reposition in western Iraq but also possibly Kuwait and Jordan. From Iraq, US forces could conduct cross-border operations against ISIL in Syria, as they had done so in the past.

US soldiers remove equipment and prepare to retrograde from their base at the Lafarge cement factory in Jalabiya, north Syria, 15 October 2019

During the withdrawal, which was described in news media as a "scramble", reports emerged showing that US and SDF troops had hastily stripped their camps and bases of sensitive materials but left fortifications in place, many of which became immediately occupied by Syrian government and Russian forces as they quickly moved into the region as part of a protection deal, established on 13 October, between the Assad government and Rojava. Video emerged online of Russian troops reportedly exploring an abandoned US outpost near Manbij. On 16 October, two Operation Inherent Resolve F-15 jets bombed their section of the Lafarge cement factory base, located between Kobanî and Ayn Issa, "to destroy an ammunition cache and reduce the facility's military usefulness" as Turkish-backed militias advanced towards the area. "The location had been the headquarters of the de facto Defeat-ISIS coalition in Syria," Inherent Resolve spokesman Col. Myles Caggins III said, adding that "No US forces or equipment were ever in jeopardy and remain within separate, secure facilities." SDF personnel burned their part of the base before departing. On the same day, President Trump commented on the developments by describing the Kurds as "no angels", and about Syria, he said: "Syria may have some help with Russia, and that's fine. It's a lot of sand. They've got a lot of sand over there. So there's a lot of sand there that they can play with".

On 18 October, after a "ceasefire" between Turkish and Kurdish forces was declared a day prior, US Defense Secretary Mark Esper stated that the withdrawal was continuing and that the US would continue to communicate with both Turkey and the SDF. A senior defense official stated that US aircraft would continue to conduct intelligence missions over northeast Syria to monitor the situation there. In late October, Esper said the US forces leaving Syria would head into western Iraq. But after Iraqi leaders said those troops can't stay there, Esper said they will be deployed in Iraq only temporarily before returning to the US According to The New York Times, citing US Defense Department officials, by 30 October at least half of the original ≈1,000 US troops in Syria had withdrawn and was expected to be reduced to roughly 250 personnel, largely concentrated in the Deir ez-Zor region.

On 31 October, Syrian President Bashar al-Assad called President Trump the "best American president", saying he was the most transparent foe, due to his audacity to openly discuss seizing Syrian oil.

On 3 November 2019 US and coalition forces departed their strategic military base near the town of Sarrin. US forces removed all their equipment and were seen leaving the base in a convoy of tens of trucks. The base was one of the largest US bases in Syria, a logistics hub that assisted in the anti-ISIL intervention. On 10 November, US Chairman of the Joint Chiefs of Staff Mark Milley stated that at least 500 to 600 US troops would remain in Syria and will not exceed 1,000 personnel. It was not clear if that estimate included the ≈200 troops at al-Tanf.

By mid-November, Russian and Syrian government forces had quickly filled the power vacuum left behind by the US in much of northern Syria. The US had withdrawn from its logistics base in Kobanî by 14 November, with Russia announcing it would set up a new helicopter base in Qamishli the same day. On 17 November, Russia's state-owned Zvezda channel aired footage of armed Russian sappers and Military Police seizing control of the Kobanî airbase days prior, with choppers landing on the US-made airstrip there and the Russian flag seen hoisted over the fortification, of which had been hastily stripped of essentials by coalition personnel, only leaving behind toiletries, sleeping facilities, some exercise equipment, and other small items. While Syrian government troops gradually re-established its presence in the region, Russia and Turkey continued to occupy and conduct patrols throughout north east Syria as well, in accordance with the Sochi Agreement.

By 4 December, the US had completed its military pullback from northeastern Syria and had consolidated its troop presence in the country to a "relatively static" 600 personnel, according to Mark Esper. The withdrawal from north Syria was partially carried out by the US Army 103rd Expeditionary Sustainment Command's Syria Logistics Cell (SLC), a key component of the Army's 1st Theater Sustainment Command, Special Operations Joint Task Force-Operation Inherent Resolve, and Combined Joint Task Force-Operation Inherent Resolve.

=== 2019–20: Eastern Syria redeployment ===
A US military convoy passes through Qamishli on 26 October 2019, amid the return of US forces to oil fields in northeast Syria

By 20 October 2019, after backlash from the US Congress, the Trump administration had conducted a partial reversal of its 6 October order to pullout 1,000 troops from Syria, instead confirming a newly dedicated mission to guard oil and gas fields and related infrastructure in SDF-controlled eastern Syria from ISIL insurgent attacks. While US forces continued to reduce its presence in northern Syria by the hundreds to avoid Syrian-SDF and Turkish fighting, the US simultaneously shifted more resources south and east into the oil-rich Deir ez-Zor Governorate. Defense Secretary Mark Esper confirmed on 25 October that the US would "maintain a reduced presence in Syria and deny ISIS access to oil revenue" and, in support of the mission, mechanized and armored units would be deployed to eastern Syria to reinforce the American presence there. Throughout late October-early November 2019, this contingent was reinforced with hundreds of new infantry troops joined by mechanized infantry Armored Brigade Combat Teams (ABCTs) in Bradley IFVs and—according to unnamed sources—potentially tanks, redeployed from Iraq and Kuwait, which was estimated to raise the number of US troops in eastern Syria to around 500 at the time. When coupled with the US garrison at al-Tanf, the contingency force's numbers rise to a flexible 800–900 personnel. In Syria's Deir ez-Zor Governorate, which lies far to the North-East of al-Tanf, the United States has stated that it will increase its presence in SDF controlled territory along the Eastern bank of the Euphrates river and also establish military bases at Al-Baghuz Fawqani, Al-Busayrah, al-Ezba, and the Al-Omar Field.

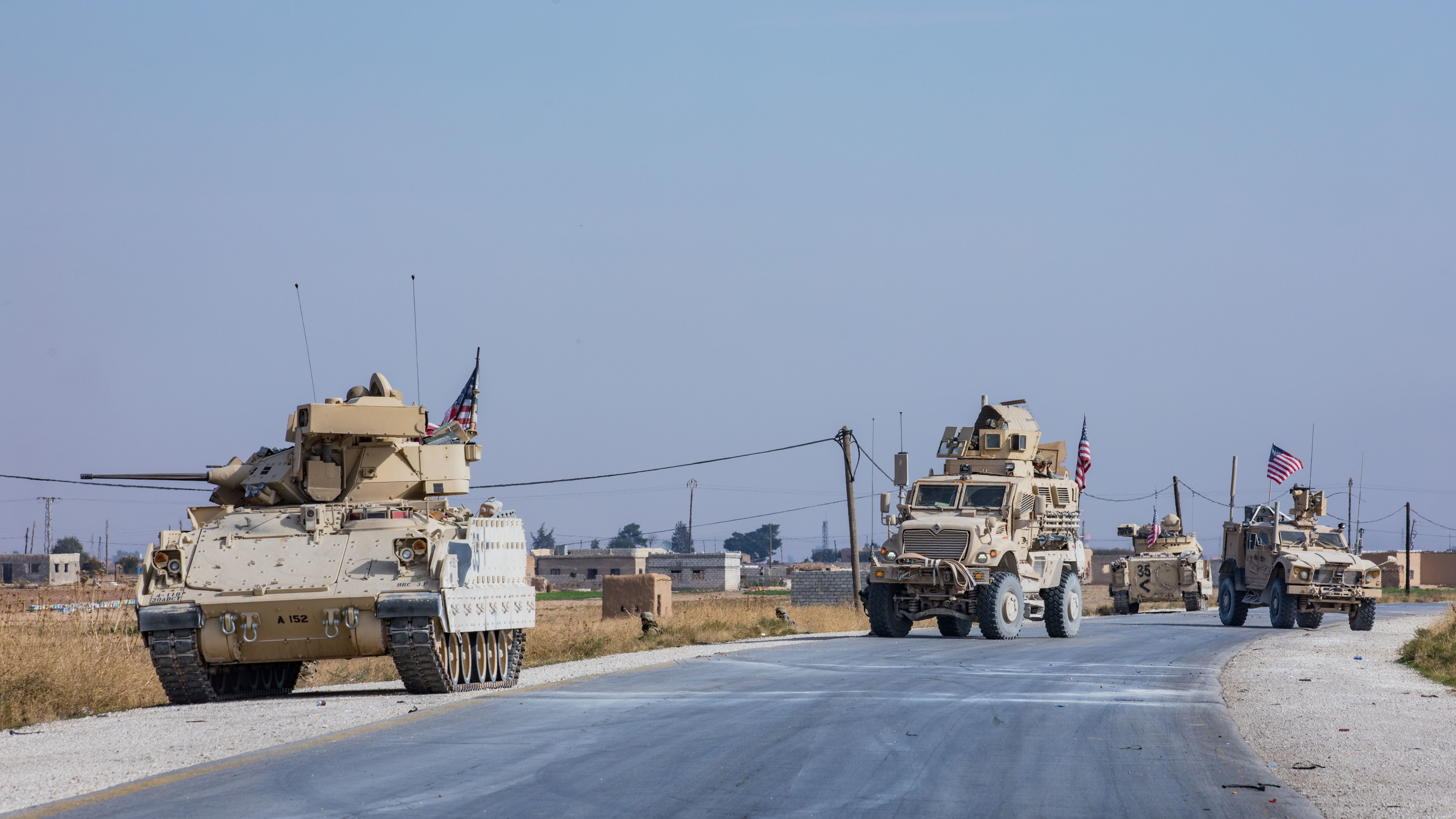
M2A2 Bradley IFVs of the 4th Battalion, 118th Infantry Regiment accompany a patrol in eastern Syria, 13 November 2019

On 30 October, the 4th Battalion, 118th Infantry Regiment, a US combined arms battalion equipped with M2A2 Bradley IFVs deployed to the Deir ez-Zor region to help guard SDF-US controlled oil and gas fields. The battalion is part of the US Army National Guard's 30th ABCT which had begun arriving in Kuwait the week prior to relieve the regular Army 3rd Brigade Combat Team, 4th Infantry Division in support of Operation Spartan Shield, the US's theater-level contingency force for the Middle East. By 31 October, US forces in M-ATV convoys were seen conducting dedicated patrols of oil and gas-related facilities throughout Syria's al-Hasakah and Deir ez-Zor Governorates, usually accompanied by SDF personnel. The US's deployment of heavy armored vehicles to Syria for the first time in the intervention—as opposed to the lighter armored RG-33s, M-ATVs, Strykers, Armored Ground Mobility Systems, and NSTVs (Non-Standard Tactical Vehicles) US special operations units and regular ground forces have used prior—introduced additional firepower and force protection capabilities for ground forces. Nevertheless, the Bradley IFVs were pulled out of Syria after less than two months of deployment due to unspecified reasons.

On 3 November, OIR officials confirmed that multiple artillery rounds landed about one kilometer from a road with a US convoy; OIR, without offering additional details, stated no personnel were injured and the patrol was not hit. The Russian Defense Ministry were the first to report the incident, adding that the incident was near Tell Tamer and that it was elements of Turkish-backed rebels that fired the artillery. On 4 November, Rudaw briefly interviewed a US special operations soldier during a patrol at an oilfield near Rmelan, who stated that US forces are "working with the SDF and they're letting us know the situation up here as they see it." According to North Press Agency, the US patrol had begun in Rmelan and spanned the towns of al-Jawadiyah, al-Malikiyah, and Ain-Diwar. On 15 December, a large US logistical convoy en route to Deir ez-Zor was reportedly seen crossing Semalka into al-Hasakah province from Iraq.

By mid-January 2020, tensions between Russian and US forces in northeast Syria had reportedly grown as US troops had increasingly begun blocking Russian convoys from accessing certain major roads between towns. Both Russia and the US operate military outposts throughout the region as a part of their respective missions. On 25 August, a Russian military vehicle rammed a US armored car near al-Malikiyah, northeastern Syria, in which four US soldiers had suffered mild concussions. Russian defense minister Sergey Shoygu said that "the US armed forces soldiers tried to block the Russian patrol"; meanwhile, a US defense official said that Russian forces went to a "security zone" that they should not enter.

On 30 July 2020, the Autonomous Administration of North and East Syria signed an agreement with an American oil company, Delta Crescent Energy LLC, to develop oil fields in the region. The Syrian authorities condemned the agreement, and mentioned that: "This agreement is null and void and has no legal basis." Seizing oil without local government permission would be a war crime of pillage.

On 17 August, US forces killed at least one Syrian soldier and wounded two others, after a fire exchange near a checkpoint in the village of Tal Dahab, near Qamishli, northeastern Syria.

On 19 September, the US deployed additional troops, equipment and armored vehicles to north-eastern Syria after tensions with Russia escalated in the region. According to officials, the moves were meant "to help ensure the safety and security of coalition forces." US Central Command mentioned that the United States had deployed Sentinel radars and Bradley vehicles to augment forces in the "Eastern Syria Security Area" (ESSA). The reinforcements were considered a response to a 26 August incident where a Russian armored vehicle collided with a coalition M-ATV, injuring four US soldiers.

It was reported on 30 November 2020 that an airstrike near the Iraq–Syria border killed an unidentified Islamic Revolutionary Guard Corps commander and three other men traveling with him from Iraq and into Syria. The vehicle was struck after it entered Syrian territory. Iraqi security and local militia officials said the commander's vehicle had weapons in it and that pro-Iran paramilitary groups helped retrieve the bodies. Sources did not identify the commander nor elaborate on the exact time of the incident. It was not immediately known who conducted the strike, and Reuters could not independently verify the reports.

=== 2021–24: Continued Iranian—US proxy conflict ===
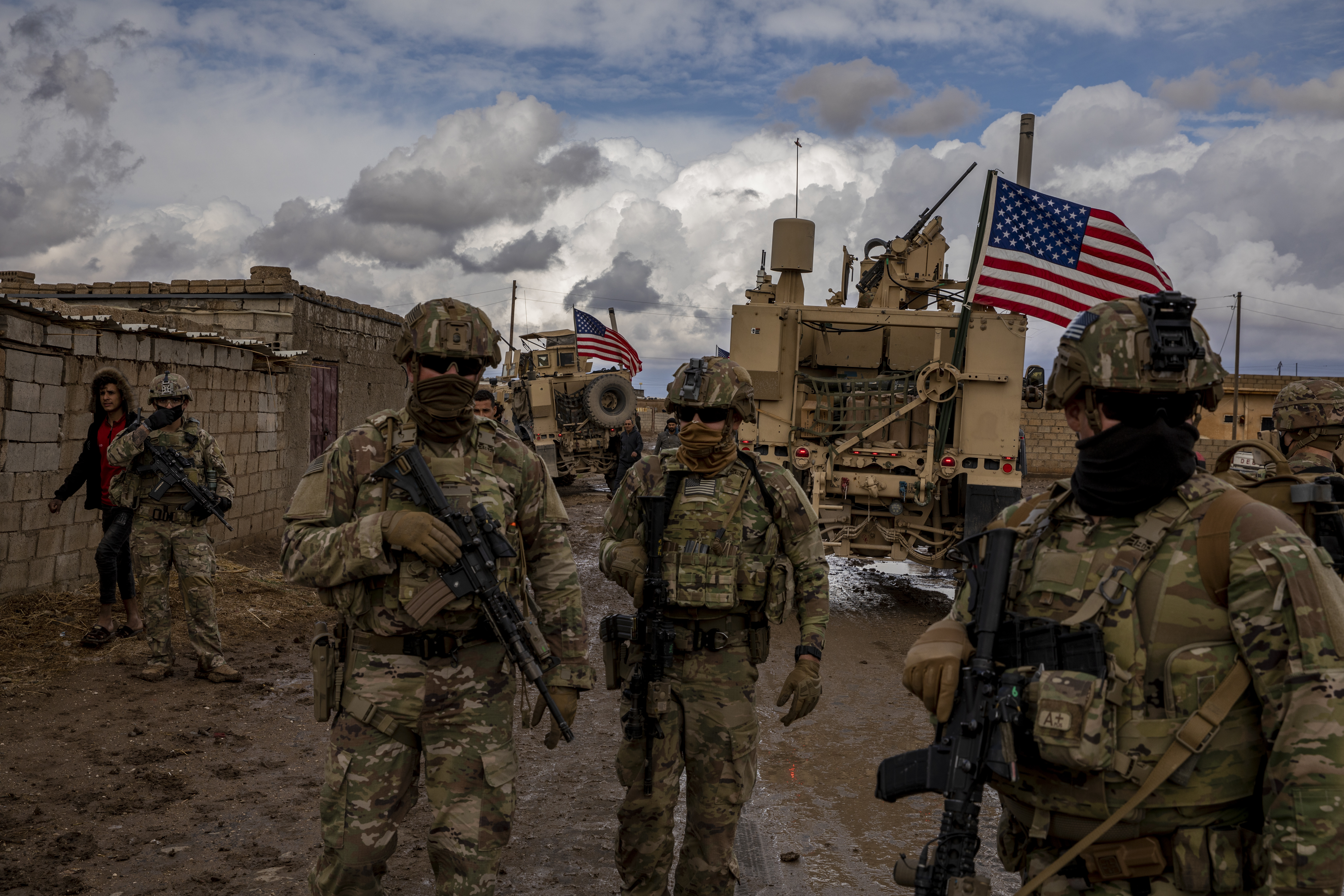
US 1st Battalion, 6th Infantry Regiment troops conduct area reconnaissance in Syria, 18 February 2021

On 10 February 2021, Pentagon Press Secretary John Kirby told reporters that US troops were not committed to protecting Syrian oil fields except "for where appropriate under certain existing authorizations to protect civilians." He added that "DOD [Department of Defense] personnel or contractors are not authorized to provide assistance to any other private company, including its employees or agents, seeking to develop oil resources in northeastern Syria." However, there were reports from local sources in northeastern Syria that US forces had transported oil and wheat smuggled from Syria to Iraq.

On 28 June 2021, President Biden directed airstrikes against Iran-backed militia groups close to the Syria-Iraq border. F-15E and F-16 aircraft were used to launch the attack in what the U.S. described as a retaliatory attack against U.S. facilities and personnel in Iraq by militia groups. Two operational and weapons storage facilities were targeted in Syria, the U.S. military revealed in a statement. Despite the U.S. not disclosing the information regarding the casualties in the attack, the SOHR stated that at least nine Iran-backed Iraqi militia fighters died, leaving many others injured. Iraqi militia groups aligned with Iran in a statement named four members of the Kataib Sayyed al-Shuhada faction they said were killed in the attack on the Syria-Iraq border. Hours later, U.S. forces in Syria came under fire, following the U.S. strikes on the Syria-Iraqi border. Pro-Iranian militias fired rockets at the American base at Al-Omar Oilfield in Syria in response to U.S. airstrikes. The U.S. coalition responded by firing heavy artillery on Iranian-backed Militias Positions around Al-Mayadin. There were no injuries sustained during the attack, the spokesman for Operation Inherent Resolve, Col. Wayne Marotto disclosed.

On 10 July 2021, a mortar shell landed near MSS Conoco, with no injuries reported. It was reportedly the fourth attack on or near U.S. troops or diplomats within a week, reportedly including one in which two service members were injured. No group claimed responsibility, but U.S. forces suspected Iran-backed proxy militias of carrying out such attacks.

On 20 October 2021, troops at the al-Tanf garrison were attacked by bomb-laden drones in what Pentagon spokesman John Kirby called a "complex, coordinated and deliberate attack". U.S. officials reportedly blamed Iran and its proxy forces for the attack, but publicly declined to specify details of the attack and whether the U.S. was considering retaliation. There were no reports of deaths or injuries. Attacks by small drones carrying munitions have posed a consistent threat to U.S. forces in eastern Syria since at least March 2020, with U.S. forces suspecting ISIL or Iran-backed elements of conducting the attacks, as U.S.-Iranian tensions in the region have persisted.

On 24 August 2022, Joe Biden ordered airstrikes on claimed IRGC and Russian-backed proxy groups in Syria near Deir ez-Zor. The airstrikes were in retaliation on an attack on the Al-Tanf garrison. The airstrikes were also considered a massive setback in negotiations in order to revive the JCPOA. Airstrikes were also reported on 25 August. Iran strongly condemned the strikes and denied any links with the targets. The Syrian Observatory for Human Rights claimed that Liwa Fatemiyoun and the Syrian Army were targeted in the airstrikes.

On 23 March 2023, at 1:38 p.m. local time (UTC+03:00), a kamikaze drone allegedly of Iranian origin struck a coalition base at Abu Hajar Airport near Rmelan, al-Hasakah Governorate in northeastern Syria, killing one United States contractor and injuring five servicemen and second contractor. The New York Times reported, US officials said the main air defense system at the base was "not fully operational" at the time of Thursday's Drone Strike. In retaliation, U.S. President Joe Biden authorized a response with an airstrike on IRGC-linked targets, including a weapons warehouse in the Harabish neighborhood in Deir ez-Zor, and military posts in the al-Mayadin and Abu Kamal countryside, killing 14 people including nine Syrians, according to SOHR.

On 24 March 2023, 10 rockets were launched at the Green Village near al-Omar oil field which injured another American serviceman. By afternoon, another rocket attack targeted US forces near the oil and gas fields of Conoco, east of Deir ez-Zor. On 30 March, the Pentagon revealed that twelve American were wounded in total with six U.S. troops in Syria suffering traumatic brain injuries due to the two attacks by Iran-backed militias. A little-known militant group known as Liwa Al-Ghaliboun (The Brigade of Those who Prevail) claimed responsibility for the initial drone attack, although some observers believe the group to simply be a front group for a larger Iranian-backed group or the IRGC.

On 18 October 2023, American military bases in Iraq, Iraqi Kurdistan and eastern Syria were attacked by three drones. Pentagon officials insisted that there are few casualties. On 26 October, United States DoD said it conducted airstrikes on two facilities in eastern Syria linked to IRGC-backed militias in retaliation for the attacks.

Tensions escalated significantly on 28 January 2024 when a one-way attack drone struck Tower 22, a small U.S. outpost in northeastern Jordan near the Syrian border, killing three U.S. soldiers and wounding dozens. The attack, attributed by U.S. officials to Iran-backed militias, marked the deadliest assault on American forces in the region in years. Following the incident, the United States launched large-scale retaliatory airstrikes in early February 2024 against more than 80 targets across Iraq and Syria, including command-and-control facilities, weapons depots, and logistics hubs associated with the IRGC and allied militias.

=== 2024–26: Post-Assad drawdown ===
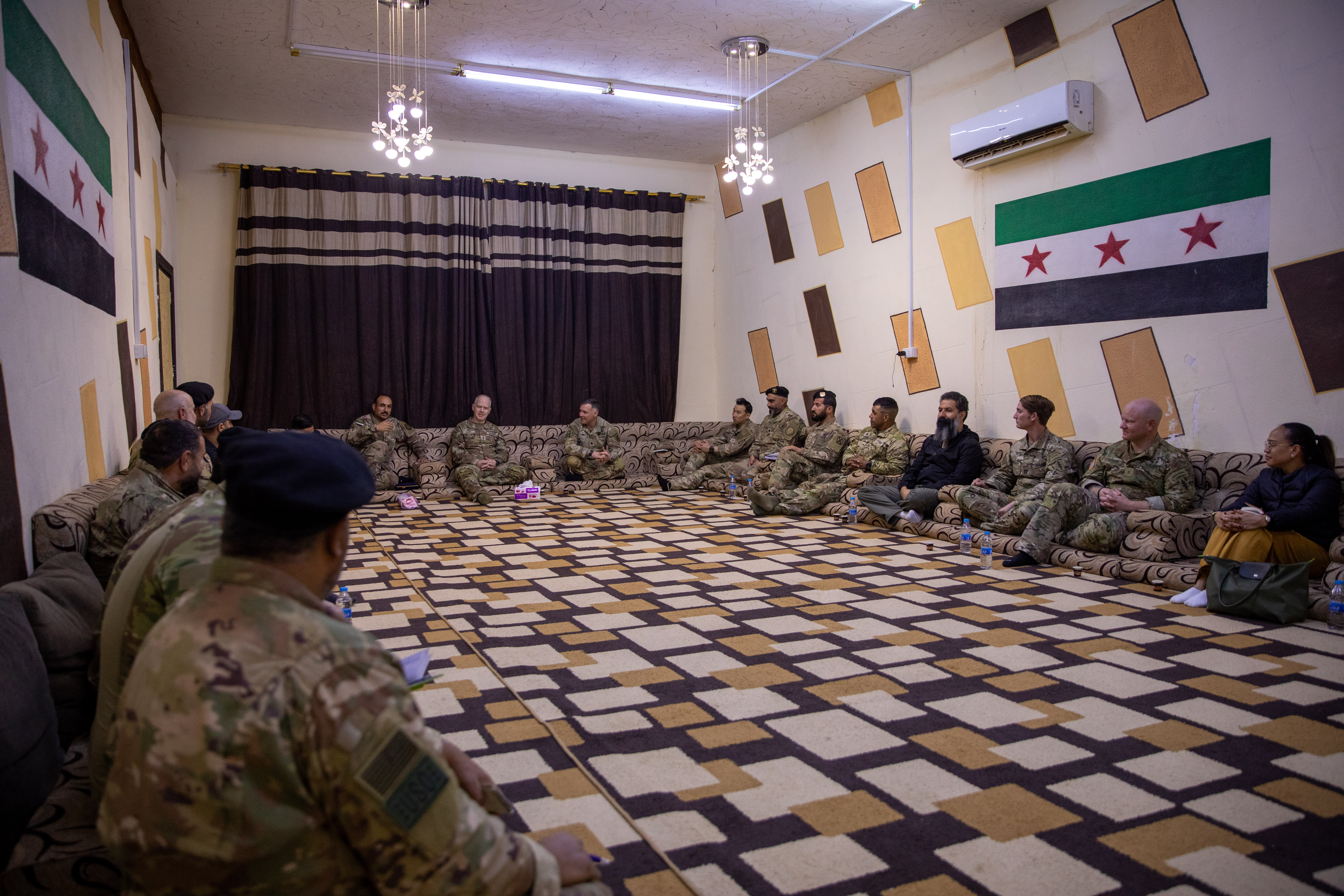
Syrian Free Army Commander, US Army Maj. Gen. Kevin Leahy, and Lt. Col. Ross Daly, assigned to 10th Mountain, Task Force Armadillo, all speak together to both SFA and US Army officers in the Deconfliction Zone, Al-Tanf, February 2025

US airstrike in Idlib Governorate killing a Hurras al-Din senior military leader, 23 February 2025

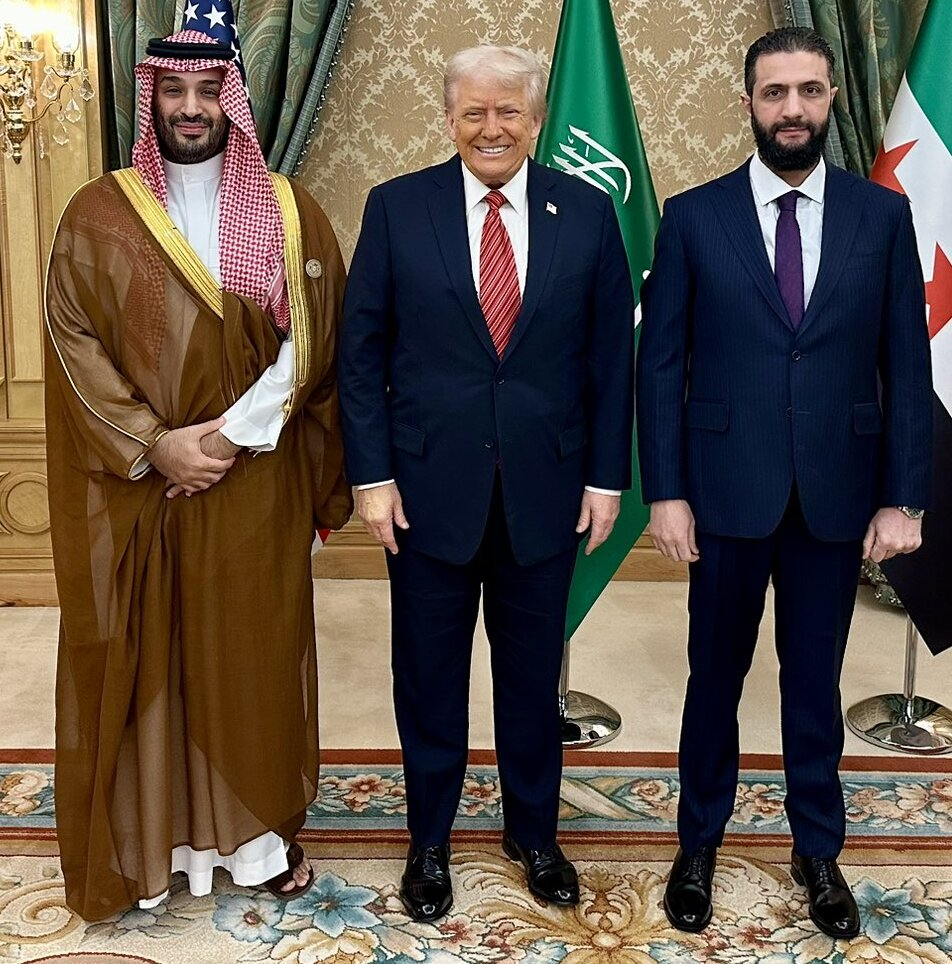
Syrian president Ahmed al-Sharaa with U.S. president Donald Trump and Crown Prince of Saudi Arabia Mohammed bin Salman in Riyadh, Saudi Arabia, 14 May 2025

A series of nationwide offensives launched in late November 2024 by the Syrian opposition, headed primarily by Hayat Tahrir al-Sham (HTS), led to a swift collapse in the Syrian military's strength and control, and the overthrow of Assad on 8 December 2024. American officials openly stated that there was no US involvement in the operations. The same day that opposition forces entered Damascus, CENTCOM said that it had attacked over 75 targets associated with IS.

With the primary conflict between the government and the opposition largely ceasing, the US began evaluating its future role in Syria. This was compounded with the re-election of Donald Trump as President, who was set to take office in January 2025 off a campaign focusing on American disengagement from foreign conflicts. Biden administration officials maintained that the US would still focus on countering IS as its primary activity in Syria. The Department of Defense admitted later in December that the actual number of American soldiers in Syria was 2,000 and not 900 as previously reported.

A slew of US airstrikes targeted leaders of Hurras al-Din, al-Qaeda's official branch in Syria, after it had announced its dissolution on 28 January 2025. Between 30 January and 25 February 2025, CENTCOM forces conducted five airstrikes, four in Idlib and one in Aleppo, which altogether killed six or seven people whom the US claimed to be senior Hurras al-Din leaders. In May 2025, U.S president Donald Trump met with Syrian president Ahmed al-Sharaa and agreed to cooperate with the new Syrian government, beginning a shift in Washington's relations with Syria up to that point.

Spokesperson Sean Parnell announced on 17 April 2025 that the Department of Defense would facilitate the "consolidation of US forces in Syria... to select locations," and bring the total amount of US soldiers in the country to less than 1,000. American forces withdrew from two bases in Deir ez-Zor Governorate as part of a larger pullout, with primary focus shifting to northeastern Hasakah Governorate. As part of newly-appointed Special Envoy Thomas Barrack's refreshed policy on Syria, around 500 soldiers were withdrawn from the country in May 2025, while the last US base in Deir ez-Zor was also left. Barrack said that the military intended to leave seven of their eight bases in the country. On 17 June 2025, reports indicated that the US handed over two bases to the SDF in Hasakah.

On 25 July 2025, US forces conducted a ground raid in Aleppo Governorate which killed senior IS leader Dhiya' Zawba Muslih al-Hardani, and his two sons, who were both adults and IS members. Three women and three children were at the site of the raid and remained unharmed, while US forces suffered no casualties. On 19 August, a month later, CENTCOM conducted a strike in Atme, Syria, killing Abu Hafs al-Hashimi al-Qurashi, an Iraqi national who was a senior IS leader and key financier. On 7 October 2025, CENTCOM killed Muhammad Abd-al-Wahhab al-Ahmad on 2 October, who was an attack planner of Ansar al-Islam, an Al-Qaeda affiliated group.

==== December 2025 Palmyra ambush and retaliation ====
In mid December 2025, two US soldiers and one interpreter were killed by a member of the al-Sharaa government's internal security forces. The killer was killed by US military. US President Trump blamed ISIS and said that the US would retaliate. During the night from 19 to 20 December, US military aircraft including F-15s, A-10s, and Boeing AH-64 Apache helicopters; M142 HIMARS systems; and Jordanian F-16s bombed 70 targets, aiming to kill ISIS fighters and destroy ISIS infrastructure.

Over the following 10 days, coalition forces conducted 11 ground missions, which resulted in the deaths of several ISIS fighters and the capture of others.

On 10 January 2026, U.S. and Jordanian forces launched a second wave of airstrikes on dozens of ISIS positions near Deir ez-Zor. CENTCOM said more than a dozen aircraft, including F-15Es, A-10s, AC-130Js, MQ-9 drones, and Jordanian F-16s, fired over 90 munitions on those targets. On 16 January, U.S. forces carried out an airstrike in northwestern Syria that killed Bilal Hasan al-Jasim, a senior militant leader believed to be affiliated with an Al-Qaeda-linked group and connected to the Palmyra ambush.

In January 2026, a northeastern Syria offensive conducted by the Syrian transitional government against the Kurdish-led SDF led to a significant security vacuum, resulting in the escape and mass transfer of thousands of ISIS detainees. Following the SDF's withdrawal from key facilities such as the al-Hawl and al-Shaddadi prisons, the U.S. military began relocating up to 9,000 detainees to Iraq to prevent a resurgence of ISIS, while Syrian government forces assumed control of several major detention centers, including al-Aqtan prison in Raqqa.

=== Withdrawal ===
On 11 February 2026, the U.S. withdrew its troops from the strategic al-Tanf military base in southeastern Syria, relocating forces and equipment into Jordan after years of operating there as part of the coalition against ISIS. Syrian government forces moved in quickly following the pullout and have taken control of the site near the borders with Jordan and Iraq, marking a significant shift in the American military presence in Syria. On 15 February, U.S. forces completed their withdrawal from al-Shaddadi base in northeastern Syria, handing the facility over to Syrian government forces and relocating personnel and equipment to Iraq. Coalition forces were also reported to be evacuating the Kharab al-Jir base near Rmelan, dismantling or destroying parts of the facility and relocating equipment toward Iraq as part of the broader U.S. military drawdown in the country. On 18 February, U.S. President Donald Trump ordered the complete withdrawal of all remaining American troops from Syria within the next two months. Prior to the announcement of a full withdrawal, the remaining U.S. military presence in Syria had already been significantly reduced and was largely confined to three installations in Hasakah province, including oil fields near Rmelan, Himo near Qamishli, and Qasrak overlooking the M4 highway. In the following days, U.S. military truck convoys were reported entering northeastern Syria from Iraq via the Al Waleed border crossing to assist in the evacuation of remaining bases, transporting equipment and logistical supplies as part of the broader American military drawdown from the country. On 14 March, the Syrian forces took control of the Rmelan base following the coalition withdrawal.

On 16 April 2026, U.S. military forces completed their withdrawal when American troops evacuated the Qasrak air base in Hasakah province, ending the U.S. military intervention in Syria after troops first arrived in 2015 to fight against the Islamic State (IS) militant group. After the evacuation of American troops from the Qasrak base, Syrian military forces entered the base and took control of it. Syrian government issued a statement announcing that it took control of all military sites in Syria that were previously occupied by US troops.

== Aftermath ==
=== The impact on the local situation ===
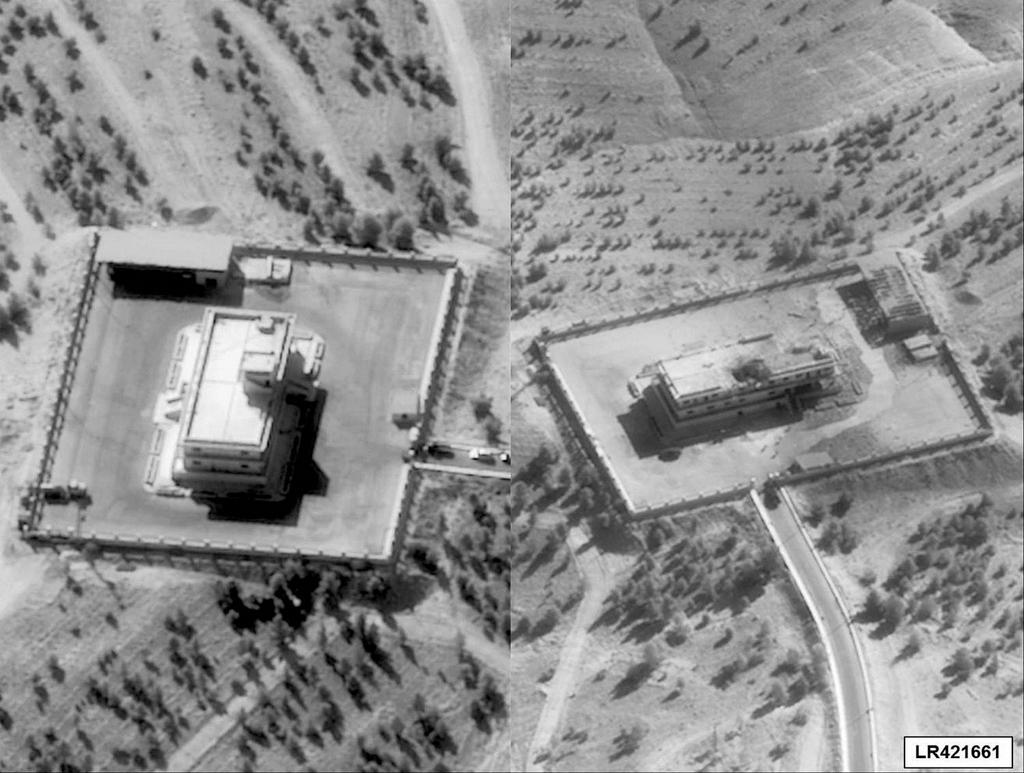
An ISIL command and control center before and after an F-22 airstrike on 23 September 2014

The US-led air campaign inflicted heavy losses on the Islamic State and, alongside special forces operations, artillery strikes, and material and intelligence support to the SDF, catalyzed the loss of the bulk of ISIL's Syrian territory. By late 2015, coalition planes were dropping or launching an average of 67 bombs or missiles a day.

According to CJTF-OIR, by May 2016, ISIL had lost 25 percent of the territory it possessed in Syria since the campaign began, mostly due to advances by YPG/SDF forces with heavy Coalition air support. By the end of 2016 the US-led air campaign against ISIL in both Iraq and Syria was estimated by the Pentagon to have struck 32,000 targets (including 164 tanks, 400 Humvees, and 2,638 pieces of oil infrastructure) and killed 50,000 militants, with approximately 1/3 of the losses taking place in Syria.

By August 2017, CJTF-OIR had flown 168,000 sorties in both Syria and Iraq (mostly against ISIL). By December 2017, the Pentagon increased the estimate to 80,000 ISIL fighters killed by coalition airstrikes between Iraq and Syria. By the end of 2018, the SDF, assisted by the coalition, had liberated over 20,000 square kilometers of territory, and three million Syrian civilians from the Islamic State.

By 23 March 2019, the day of ISIL's territorial collapse in Syria, CJTF-OIR and partner forces had liberated nearly 110,000 square kilometres (42,000 sq mi) from the Islamic State; as a result, 7.7 million people no longer lived under ISIL's "caliphate".

The United Nations estimated in August 2020 that over 10,000 ISIL insurgents remained in Syria and Iraq.

=== Post-withdrawal operations ===
In June 2026, U.S. CENTCOM conducted an airstrike in northwestern Syria killing Ali Husayn al-Ulaywi, who was the leader of ISIS in Syria at the time. This marked the first known time since the American withdrawal that the United States had conducted an attack in Syria against ISIS.

In July 2026, amid the 2026 Iran War, Iran's Islamic Revolutionary Guard Corps claimed to have bombed al-Tanf in response to US strikes inside Iran. Officially, US forces withdrew from al-Tanf in February 2026. An anonymous Syrian military source denied that al-Tanf had been attacked.

== Turkish involvement ==
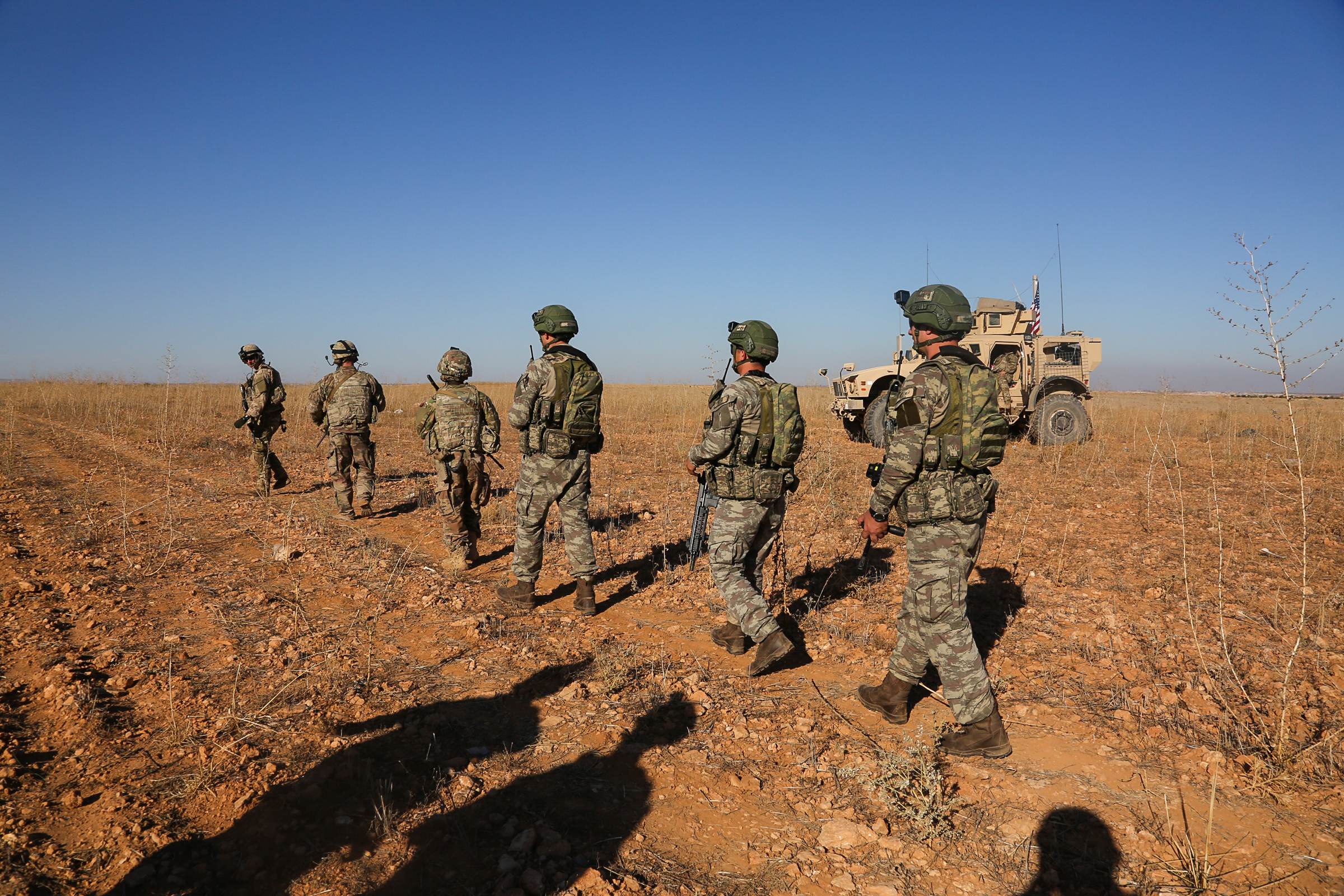
US and Turkish soldiers conduct joint patrols, Manbij outskirts, 1 November 2018

Turkey, a NATO member, has been involved in the Syrian civil war since the beginning of hostilities. Turkey has trained and armed some members of the Free Syrian Army and al-Qaeda in Syria, and has been involved in certain spillover incidents. On 2 October 2014, the Turkish Parliament authorized direct military action in both Iraq and Syria including using military force in Syria and Iraq as well as allowing coalition members to use bases in Turkey. Turkey has also stationed troops and tanks on its southern border near the Syrian border city of Kobanî. The Turkish government demanded several things to go along with them intervening against ISIL, including a buffer zone in Northern Syria, a no-fly zone over certain parts of northern Syria, ground troops from other countries, and the training of moderate opposition forces to fight both ISIL and al-Assad.

In October 2014, the Turkish Parliament authorized direct military action in both Iraq and Syria, including using military force, as well as allowing Combined Joint Task Force – Operation Inherent Resolve members to use bases in Turkey. The same month, US Vice President Joe Biden accused Turkey of funding al-Nusra and al Qaeda, after which Turkish President Recep Tayyip Erdoğan demanded an apology, adding that if no apology was made, Biden would become "history to me." Biden subsequently apologized.

On 22 February 2015, the Turkish Army mounted an operation across the border to evacuate its soldiers from the Tomb of Suleyman Shah and relocate the tomb. The Turkish convoy of 572 troops in 39 tanks and 57 armoured vehicles transited through Kurdish-held city of Kobanî en route to the tomb. One Turkish soldier was killed in what government of Turkey described as an accident. The success of the operation was announced 22 February by Turkish Prime Minister Ahmet Davutoğlu.

Rising anti-American sentiment in Turkey has occurred since the start of the Turkish invasion of northern Syria in January 2018 aimed at ousting Syrian Kurdish forces from the enclave of Afrin. A poll conducted in Turkey during the operation revealed that 90 percent of respondents believed that the United States is "behind" the Kurdish PKK and YPG. After the start of the Turkish invasion, US Secretary of Defense Jim Mattis stated that "Turkey is a NATO ally. It's the only NATO country with an active insurgency inside its borders. And Turkey has legitimate security concerns." Turkish Deputy Prime Minister Bekir Bozdag urged the United States to halt its support for Kurdish YPG fighters, saying: "Those who support the terrorist organization will become a target in this battle."

On 30 April 2023, Turkish President Recep Tayyip Erdoğan announced that the Turkish National Intelligence Organization had allegedly tracked down and killed ISIS leader Abu al-Hussein al-Husseini al-Qurashi on 29 April. Turkish media reported that the operation occurred at Jindires, in which Abu al-Hussein detonated his suicide vest to avoid being captured. However, the United States could not verify claims by Turkey that its forces killed Abu al-Hussein al-Husseini al-Qurashi.

In August, ISIS said Quraishi was killed during clashes with Hay'at Tahrir al-Sham (HTS), whom it accused to be agents of Turkish intelligence. The United States believes the HTS is behind the killing despite the latter's denials.

=== Northern Syria Buffer Zone ===
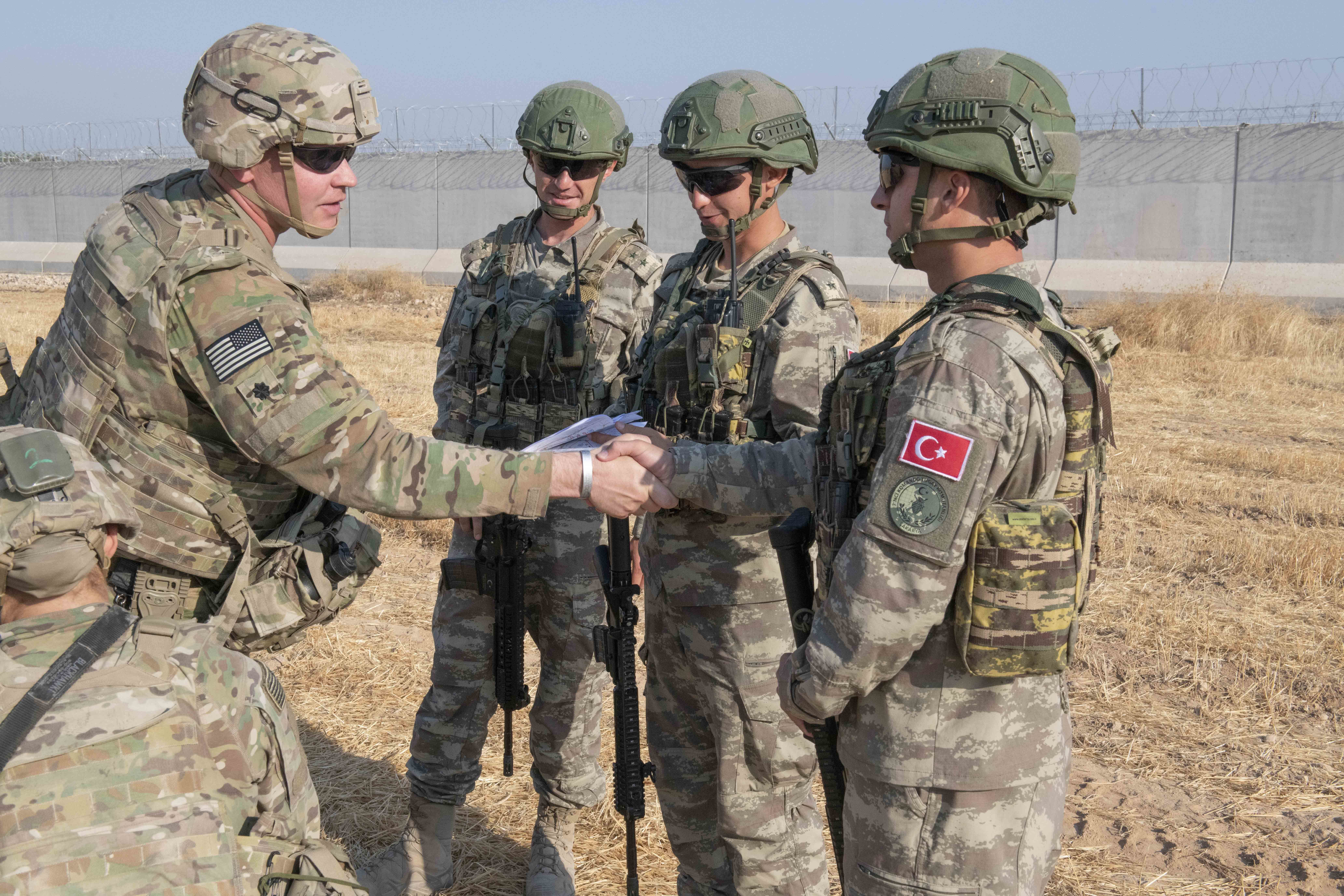
US and Turkish soldiers rendezvous in the Northern Syria Buffer Zone, 4 October 2019.

On 15 January 2019, the Turkish President Recep Tayyip Erdogan said he agreed with setting up a 35 km (22 mi) "safe zone" in northern Syria, after engaging with US President Donald Trump a few days prior.

On 7 August 2019, after months of negotiations, Turkey and the US reached a deal to create a 115 km (71 mi) buffer zone in northern Syria along the Syria–Turkey border between the Tigris and Euphrates rivers. Separate from Turkey's own occupation zone in northern Syria, the deal was reached partly to prevent a potential future Turkish ground incursion into Rojava against US-backed Kurdish forces. Under the framework of the deal, the US and Turkey conducted joint troop patrols, and Turkish reconnaissance aircraft would be allowed to monitor the zone. Kurdish YPG and YPJ forces along the Turkish border dismantled their border fortifications, withdrew to a "security belt" alongside regular SDF forces, and removed all heavy weapons from the area. In turn, Turkey was not to conduct airstrikes or establish military observation posts in northern Syria, and was not to "occupy" the region, as administrative and civil rule was to be relegated to SDF military councils and the Kurdish Autonomous Administration of North and East Syria. According to the SDF, the majority of the zone was not to include any cities or towns.

The buffer zone agreement was proven to be short-lived and collapsed on 7 October, after US President Donald Trump gave his approval for a Turkish ground offensive into Rojava, and ordered the withdrawal of US troops from northern Syria. The agreement was rendered fully obsolete on 9 October, when Turkey launched a ground incursion into Rojava. In response to the offensive, US Senator Lindsey Graham warned that he would "introduce bipartisan sanctions against Turkey if they invade Syria." He said he would also "call for their suspension from NATO if they attack Kurdish forces who assisted the US in the destruction of the ISIS Caliphate."

== Reports of civilian casualties and war crimes ==
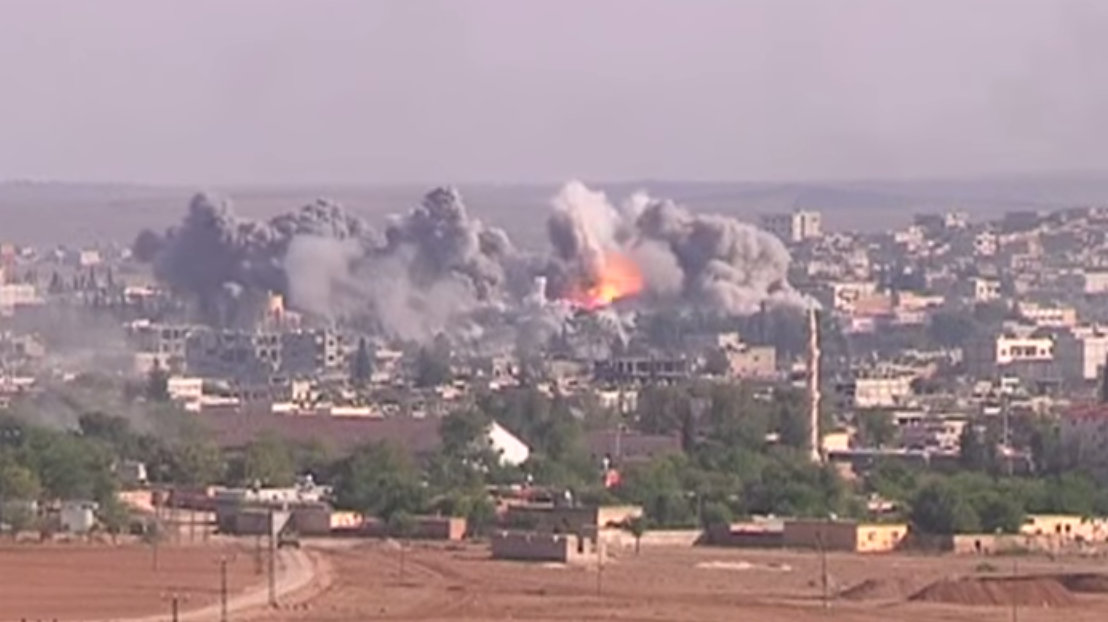
A coalition airstrike on ISIL positions in Kobanî.

On 29 September 2014, several groups including the Syrian Observatory for Human Rights (SOHR), the Aleppo Media Center, and the Local Coordination Committees reported that US strikes hit a grain silo in the ISIL-controlled town of Manbij in northern Syria, killing two civilians.

The SOHR reported ten airstrikes, also targeting various parts of the province of Idlib, killed at least one child and six other civilians. The group said at least 19 civilians had been killed in coalition airstrikes at that time. The Pentagon reported it had no evidence of any civilian casualties from airstrikes targeting militants in Syria. The United States has also acknowledged that its rules to avoid civilian casualties are looser in Syria than those for drone strikes elsewhere.

The SOHR and other activist groups reported that seven civilians were killed when an air strike hit a gas distribution facility near the town of al-Khasham is the eastern Deir al-Zor province on 17 October 2014 and three civilians were killed in an air strike on 16 October 2014 in the north east province of al-Hasakah. According to their reports, most of the civilians killed were fuel tanker drivers.

According to Reuters, 50 civilians were killed in Syria by US-led airstrikes, from the start of the campaign in late September 2014 to mid-November. On 28 December 2014, a US airstrike in the northern Syrian town of Al-Bab killed more than 50 civilians.

On 21 May 2015, the United States admitted it "probably" killed two children in bombings near Harem on 4 and 5 November 2014. These are the first such admissions of the campaign, and followed a military investigation. A similar investigation regarding an event in Syria is underway, and two regarding events in Iraq. Two adult civilians were also minorly injured in the Harem strikes. The deaths and injuries are attributed by the military investigation to unintentional secondary explosions, after the bombers hit their intended targets, linked to the Khorasan. On 19 July 2016 a coalition led airstrike on the ISIL controlled villages of Tokhar and Hoshariyeh reportedly killed at least 56 civilians, including 11 children. On 3 August 2016, dozens of civilians were killed after an airstrike in al-Qa'im, some sources claiming that 30 were killed.

Airwars, which "maintains an extensive database of all known allegations in which civilians and friendly forces have been reported killed by the Coalition since August 2014", reports between 503 and 700 civilians were killed by Coalition airstrikes in Syria as of April 2016.

By January 2017, the Syrian Observatory for Human Rights reported that 6,909 people had been killed in coalition airstrikes in Syria since September 2014, including 820 civilians, among them 193 children and 117 women. At least 33 people were killed in a US-led coalition airstrike on a school near Raqqa in March 2017. On 16 March 2017, a US airstrike in rebel-held Aleppo killed at least 46 people and wounded more than 100 after warplanes hit a mosque.

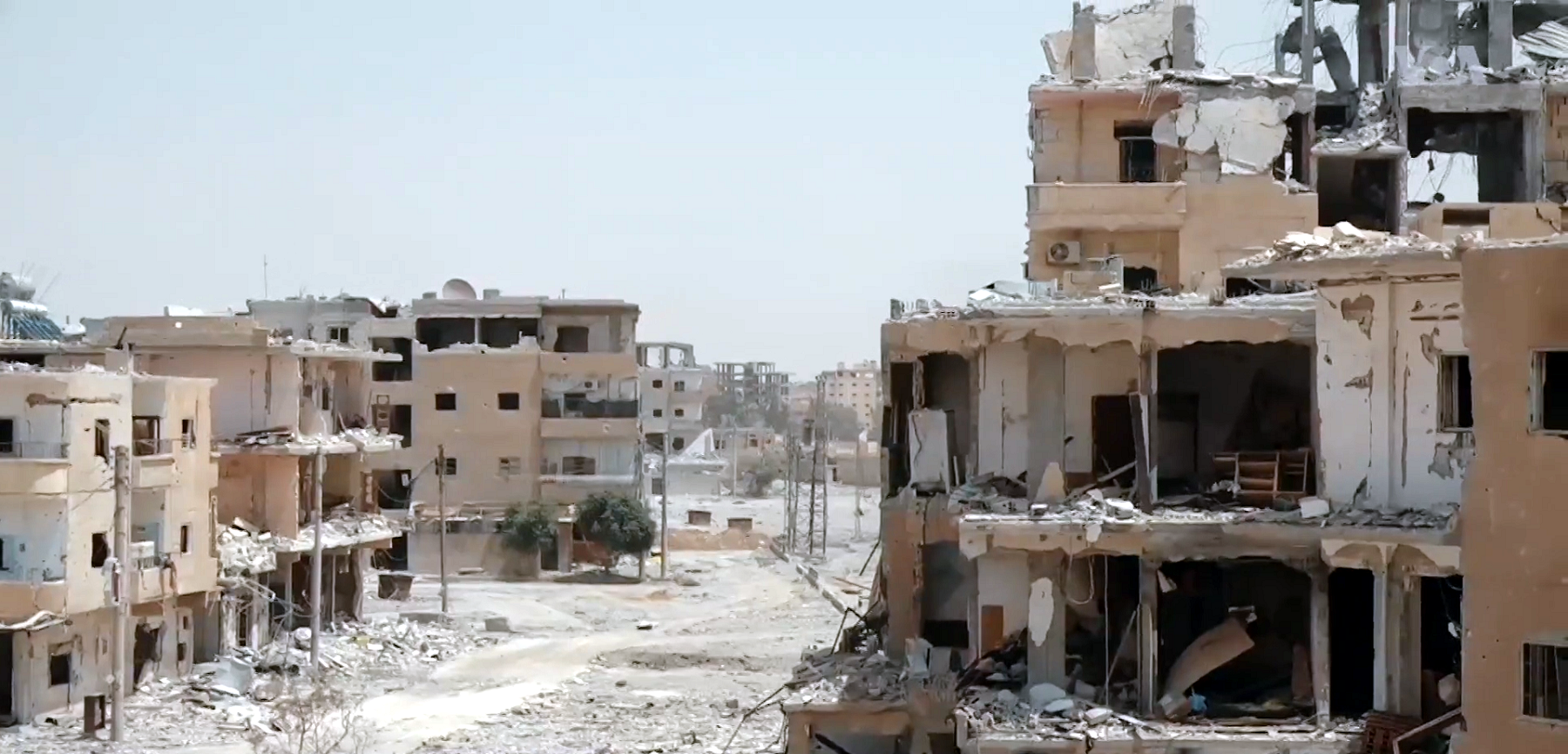
A destroyed neighborhood in Raqqa in August 2017

According to a report by Amnesty International, the US-led Coalition has provided falsified data to conceal the actual number of civilian deaths resulting from their bombing campaigns and is "deeply in denial" about civilian casualties in Raqqa. After an investigation by Amnesty International in June 2018, the US-led Coalition confirmed that "coalition air strikes killed 70 civilians, mostly women and children—including 39 members of a single family."

According to Airwars, the strikes of US-led coalition killed as many as 6,000 civilians in Syria and Iraq in 2017.

On 2 May 2018, Britain's Ministry of Defense admitted for the first time that a civilian was "unintentionally" killed in an anti-ISIL drone strike on 26 March 2018. According to the MoD, the civilian was on a motorbike and entered the target area at the last minute. Defense Secretary Gavin Williamson said the incident was "deeply regrettable".

On 18 March 2019, during the Battle of Baghuz Fawqani, a US special operations-led airstrike killed up to 80 people, including 64 civilians, almost exclusively women and children, and 18 ISIL militants, according to The New York Times. The site of the strike was bulldozed and the incident was covered up by the US military until a New York Times report exposed the cover-up in November 2021. A US military investigation in May 2022 concluded that the airstrike killed 52 ISIL fighters and 4 civilians and did not violate the laws of war.

On 25 April 2019, a joint investigation by Amnesty International and Airwars of over 200 strike sites reported that anti-ISIL Coalition bombing during the 2017 Battle of Raqqa had killed 1,600 civilians alone. CJTF-OIR reported the month prior that its 4-year operations over both Iraq and Syria amounted to 1,257 civilian casualties overall. "Coalition forces razed Raqqa...Amnesty International and Airwars call upon the Coalition forces to end their denial about the shocking scale of civilian deaths and destruction caused by their offensive in Raqqa," the investigators said in a joint statement. The Coalition responded that they "continue to employ thorough and deliberate targeting and strike processes to minimize the impact of our operations on civilian populations and infrastructure."

By August 2023, Airwars estimated 8,198–13,258 civilian deaths in Iraq and Syria due to Coalition airstrikes, including 1,725–2,367 children, 1,120-1,460 women, and 3,722 named victims. The Coalition's own estimate of civilian deaths was 1,417. Coalition airstrikes also wounded between 5,883 and 9,111 civilians.

On 22 February 2024, during live-fire weapons training on an undisclosed range in the area of Al-Hasakah, US forces killed one child and wounded two others. The incident was reported by US and partner forces, citing the incident "was more likely than not due to a compilation of factors related to operating a military weapons range."

== Reactions ==
=== Domestic US approval ===
The intervention was initially conducted with strong domestic US support; according to Gallup polling in 2014, 61% of Americans supported intervention against ISIL in both Iraq and Syria, while 30% were opposed, and 9% undecided. A larger CCGA poll taken in 2016 showed that 72% of Americans supported "conducting airstrikes against violent Islamic extremist groups in Syria", while 58% also supported "sending special operations forces into Syria to fight violent Islamic extremist groups." Additionally, a slim majority (52%) supported "enforcing a no-fly zone over parts of Syria, including bombing Syrian air defenses." However, only 26% supported "sending arms and other supplies to anti-government rebel groups in Syria."

A CNN poll conducted between 17 and 20 October 2019 (during a withdrawal of US troops from northern Syria amid a Turkish offensive there) showed that 75% of Americans were generally concerned about the situation in Syria, with 43% saying they were "very concerned". 51% thought the US had a responsibility to remain involved in the Syrian conflict (seven months after ISIL's final Syrian settlement had fallen), while 43% did not.

A survey conducted by YouGov and Concerned Veterans for America between 19–23 September 2025 showed that 61% of Americans supported withdrawing troops from Syria, with 27% being neither opposed nor supportive of a withdrawal and 12% at least somewhat opposed to withdrawing troops. The survey was conducted among 1,000 respondents, including veterans, military families and the general public.

=== Syrian reactions ===
- Ba'athist Syria – In 2014, a week before the first airstrikes, Ali Haidar, the Syrian Minister of National Reconciliation, said that "any action of any kind without the consent of the Syrian government would be an attack on Syria". However, despite Haidar's original statement, after the coalition campaign began, the Syrian government struck a more conciliatory tone with Foreign Minister Walid al-Moallem suggesting the airstrikes were an indication that Syria and the anti-ISIL coalition were on the same side. Among the general Syrian population, a July 2015 poll by ORB International surveying 1,365 adults in all of Syria's 14 governorates found that 47% supported US-led airstrikes on ISIL while 50% opposed them. Opposition to American airstrikes was strongest in ISIL-held territory, where 92% were opposed; support was strongest in YPG-held territory and government-held territory, where 87% and 55% respectively supported American strikes on ISIL.
- Syrian opposition – Hadi Bahra, the leader of the National Coalition for Syrian Revolutionary and Opposition Forces called for airstrikes against ISIL before the intervention began. The coalition is recognized by 20 countries, the European Union, and the Arab league as the legitimate representative of Syria in opposition to the Assad government. Bahra said strikes were needed to weaken ISIL, a faction in the inter-rebel conflict during the Syrian civil war, so that the Free Syrian Army and other moderate opposition forces could oppose Assad more effectively. Despite Bahra's support, many Syrian rebel groups have criticized US airstrikes for targeting only ISIL who are enemies of the Assad government, while not also targeting Assad government forces, the results of which could help government forces gain more ground. Meanwhile, jihadist groups within the opposition have portrayed the coalition as an anti-Sunni stooge of the Syrian regime, while many Sunnis in Syria are angered that only extremist Sunnis are being targeted while mostly Shiite Assad forces are not targeted. Some rebels defected to extremist groups as a result of the US decision to strike jihadist groups other than ISIL, such as the al-Nusra Front.

=== International reactions ===
In a Pew poll taken in 2015, a median of 62% of people across the nations polled said they support American military efforts against the Islamic State group in Iraq and Syria, while a median of 24% were opposed. Among those in support were 78% of Lebanese, 77% of Jordanians, 48% of Turks, 53% of Palestinians, and 84% of Israelis, as well as 81% of French, 66% of British, and 62% of Germans.

- Australia – Tony Abbott, the Prime Minister of Australia, praised the intervention, saying that an international effort was needed in order to combat the ISIL threat. Despite Abbott's support for the intervention, the Australian Government said it is not likely to contribute forces to operations in Syria.
- Canada – Stephen Harper, the Prime Minister of Canada, said in October 2014 Canada would strike ISIL targets in Syria if the Assad government gave approval. New Prime Minister Justin Trudeau called President Obama almost immediately after coming into office to inform him that Canada will be ceasing air operations in coordination with Americans. Trudeau did not give a time frame.
- Czech Republic – Lubomír Zaorálek, the Minister of Foreign Affairs of the Czech Republic supported the intervention against the Islamic State and said that it is important to keep supporting the ground forces in the battle against ISIS and the Czech Republic will keep providing military support to the Iraqi army and to the Kurdish Peshmerga. He also noted that air strikes would not defeat Islamic State. The Czech government said that ISIS is enemy not only for safety in the Middle East, but also for security and stability in the Czech Republic and Europe.
- Ecuador – The Ecuadorian government opposed the airstrikes in Syria without the consent of the Syrian government.
- Egypt – Egyptian President Abdel Fattah el-Sisi expressed his government's support for the international campaign against ISIL, and a spokesperson for the Egyptian foreign ministry echoed his statements by reiterating the Egyptian government's willingness to back the war against ISIL.
- Germany – German foreign minister Frank-Walter Steinmeier questioned whether President Obama's plan was adequate in order to combat ISIL and said Germany had not been asked to participate in airstrikes nor would it participate if asked.
- Iran – Iranian President Hassan Rouhani condemned ISIL's actions but also called the airstrikes in Syria "illegal" because they were conducted without the consent of the Syrian government. Iran's deputy foreign minister Hossein Amir Abdollahian was reported in Iranian media as saying that Iran had warned the United States that Israel would be at risk should the US and its allies seek to topple Syrian president Bashar al-Assad while fighting ISIL in Syria.
- Israel – Israeli Prime Minister Benjamin Netanyahu said Israel fully supported the US government's calls for united action against ISIL.
- Japan – A spokesperson for the Japanese Ministry of Foreign Affairs said the Japanese government would continue to closely coordinate with the United States and other countries, along with offering support and cooperation in their strikes against ISIL.
- Netherlands – Mark Rutte, the Prime Minister of the Netherlands, showed understanding for the intervention against ISIL in Syria and said that his government was exploring options to contribute in the fight against ISIL.
- Russia – Alexander Lukashevich, Russian Foreign Ministry spokesman, opposed the military intervention "without the consent of the legitimate government" and said that "this step, in the absence of a UN Security Council decision, would be an act of aggression, a gross violation of international law". On 14 October, Russian Foreign Minister Sergey Lavrov questioned the motives of the intervention, saying "Maybe their stated goal is not entirely sincere? Maybe it is regime change?" He also questioned the effectiveness of the year long campaign "With, as far as I know, 25,000 sorties they [US-led air campaign] could have smashed the entire [country of] Syria into smithereens," continuing to remark that "positive results 'on the ground' are not visible". He also criticized the continued supply of arms to rebels, saying "I want to be honest, we barely have any doubt that at least a considerable part of these weapons will fall into the terrorists' hands." He continued to call for the countries involved to join a coalition made up of Russian, Syrian, Iranian, Iraqi, Jordanian and Hezbollah forces against what Russia claims is solely ISIL and al Qaeda, but the US has asserted is primarily non-jihadist opposition forces.

Dmitry Peskov, spokesman for the Russian President Vladimir Putin, described the US air strikes on the Shayrat airbase as "an act of aggression against a sovereign state delivered in violation of international law under a far-fetched pretext.... a serious blow to Russian-US relations, which are already in a poor state".

Foreign Minister Sergei Lavrov referred to the Sharyat attack as "an act of aggression under a completely invented pretext". He compared events in April 2017 to "the situation of 2003, when the USA, the UK and several of their allies invaded Iraq without the UN Security Council's approval—a grave violation of international law—but at that point they at least tried to show some material evidence."

- Turkey – The Davutoglu Government called on the Grand National Assembly of Turkey to approve measures that would grant extensive authority to the president to launch military operations in both Syria and Iraq, including the authority to send troops across the border, although it is unclear whether the Turkish leadership intends to act on that authority. President Recep Tayyip Erdoğan has urged the establishment of a no-fly zone by coalition forces in northern Syria.
- United Kingdom – A spokesperson for British Prime Minister David Cameron said the UK would not rule out airstrikes in Syria against ISIL. On 26 September 2014 Parliament voted 524 to 43 to approve action inside Iraq. While visiting Iraqi Kurdistan in mid October, British Foreign Secretary Philip Hammond said he saw no immediate demand from US and Arab militaries for Britain to extend its airstrikes to Syria. British Defense Minister Michael Fallon said on 21 October that British Reaper drones and Rivet Joint surveillance aircraft would be starting intelligence-gathering missions in Syria "very shortly."
- United States – In November 2019, President Donald Trump ordered US troops to secure the oil fields in eastern Syria, then said any remaining US troops in Syria were there "only for the oil", and that the US was "keeping the oil".
- United Nations – Ban Ki-moon, UN secretary-general, welcomed the airstrikes against militants in Syria, but noted that the involved parties "must abide by international humanitarian law and take all precautions to avoid and minimize civilian casualties".
- Venezuela – At the 69th General Assembly of the United Nations, President Nicolas Maduro said "It's President Bashar al-Assad and the Syrian government which have stopped the terrorists" and continued by saying "Instead of bombing and bombing, we must make an alliance for peace". May all who were killed in this conflict, foe or friend, rest in peace.

== See also ==
- Foreign interventions by the United States
- Military intervention against the Islamic State of Iraq and the Levant
- American-led intervention in Iraq (2014–2021)
- Siege of Kobanî
- Military of ISIL
- Foreign involvement in the Syrian civil war
- Opposition–ISIL conflict during the Syrian Civil War
- Iraqi insurgency (2011–2013)
- 2015 Egyptian military intervention in Libya
- List of wars and battles involving ISIL
- Syria–United States relations
- Russian intervention in the Syrian civil war
- Timeline of the Syrian Civil War (August 2014–present)
- List of United States attacks on the Syrian government during the Syrian Civil War
- List of United States special forces raids during the Syrian Civil War
- James Franklin Jeffrey
