= Al-Malikiyah Municipal Airfield =

Aerodrome in Syria

Al-Malikiyah Municipal Airfield مطار مدينة المالكية
- IATA: none; ICAO: none

Summary
- Airport type: Public
- Owner: Government of Syria
- Operator: General Authority of Civil Aviation
- Serves: Al-Malikiyah, Syria
- Location: Kezimyê village
- Coordinates: 37°11′8″N 042°13′56″E

Map
- Location of airport in Syria

Runways
Direction	Length		Surface
Direction	m	ft	Surface
	810	2,657	Asphalt

Al-Malikiyah Municipal Airfield (Arabic: مطار مدينة المالكية, Kurmanji Kurdish: Balafirgeha Dêrik şaredariyê de) is a basic aerodrome serving Al-Malikiyah (also known as Dêrik or Dayrik), a small Kurdish city in far northeastern Syria. The airfield is about 8.5 kilometres (5.3 miles; 4.6 nautical miles) east of the city.

== Facilities ==
The airport resides at an elevation of 397 metres (1,302 ft) above mean sea level. It has one runway with an asphalt surface measuring 810 by 25 metres (2,657 ft × 82 ft). As it is predominantly used by agricultural aviation as well as for limited General aviation, it only has very basic facilities.

== During Syrian Civil War ==
The Aerodrome is controlled by the People's Protection Units on behalf of the Jazira Canton, after they and the Women's Protection Units captured the Al-Malikiyah District at the beginning of the Syrian Civil War.

In January 2016 it was reported that the US Military were planning to create an airforce base at Rmelan or in this location in order to increase the capacity of their military training operations to upskill the Syrian Democratic Forces. The airfield in Rmelan, Abu Hajar Airport is at a more advance state as its length has been extended to 1.3 kilometres (4,300 feet).
