= Abu Hajar Airport =

Abu Hajar Airport مطار أبو حجر
- IATA: none; ICAO: none

Summary
- Airport type: Military
- Owner: Syrian Armed Forces
- Operator: Syrian Air Force
- Location: Rmelan, al-Hasakah Governorate
- In use: Yes
- Coordinates: 36°53′52″N 41°59′51″E

Map
- Location in Syria

Runways
Direction	Length		Surface
Direction	m	ft	Surface
	700 (est.)	2,296 (est.)

The Abu Hajar Airport (Arabic: مطار أبو حجر), a.k.a. Rmeilan base or Kharab al-Jir base, is an airfield near the town of Rmelan in al-Hasakah Governorate of Syria. Before 2010, it was used as an agricultural transport airport and was subsequently abandoned until the end of 2015.

== History ==
In November and December 2015, the United States Air Force reportedly began reconstruction work of the airstrip with the support of the People's Protection Units in the area, landing two helicopters in the field. The runway was reportedly planned to be expanded to 2,500 by 250 metres (8,202 ft × 820 ft) wide to be prepared for use by military aircraft.

The airport is planned to be used by the Combined Joint Task Force – Operation Inherent Resolve to provide air support for the Syrian Democratic Forces. The US had already airlifted 40 short tons (36 t) of supplies to the SDF as of 12 October 2015, two days after its establishment.

In January 2016, the SDF confirmed the handover of control of the air base from the YPG to the USAF. Based on satellite imagery, the runway was under construction to be expanded to 1,315 metres (4,314 ft) from the original 700 metres (2,297 ft) length. The US subsequently denied the reports that the USAF has taken control of the airport.

In February 2016, the SDF announced that the airbase will only be used as a military logistics transportation base using Lockheed C-130 Hercules and helicopters, with the possibility of being a combat base in the future. In late September, the Local Coordination Committees of Syria reported that a US helicopter transported opposition politician Ahmad Jarba and actor Jamal Suliman from Iraqi Kurdistan region to the airport.

In March 2026, with the withdrawal of US troops from Syria, the airport was handed over to the Syrian Air Force.
