= Rmelan =

Rmelan رميلان Rimêlan
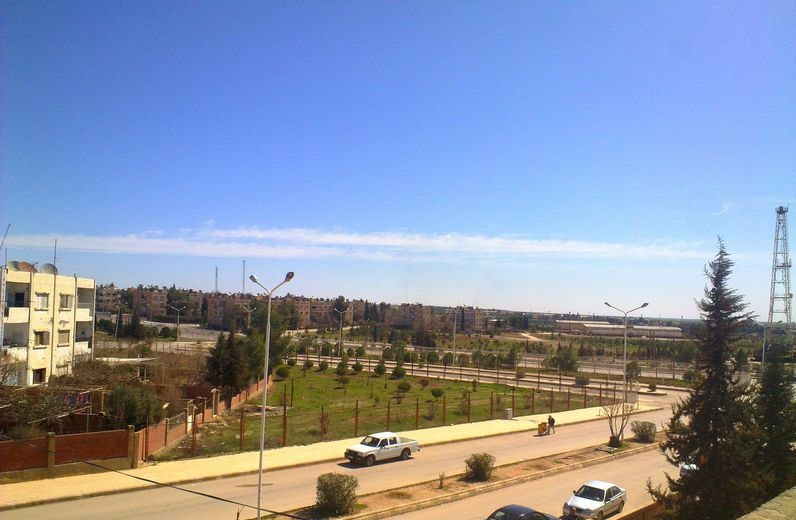
- Rmelan

- Location in Syria
- Coordinates: 37°0′N 41°57′E
- Country: Syria
- Governorate: al-Hasakah
- District: al-Malikiyah
- Subdistrict: al-Yaarubiyah
- Founded: 1956

Area
  - Total: 5 km^{2} (1.9 sq mi)

Population (2009 est.)
  - Total: 11,500
- Time zone: UTC+2 (EET)
  - Summer (DST): +3
- Area code: 052

Rmelan (Arabic: رميلان, romanized: Ramilan; Kurdish: رمێلان, romanized: Rimêlan) is a town in al-Hasakah Governorate of northeastern Syria. Administratively part of al-Yaarubiyah nahiyah of al-Malikiyah District, the town is located 900 km northeast of the capital Damascus, 165 km northeast of the governorate capital al-Hasakah, 70 km east of Qamishli, 30 km southwest of the district centre al-Malikiyah, and 0.5 km southwest of the sub-district centre Ma'badah. It has an area of 5 km^{2} and a population of 11,500 according to the 2009 official estimate.

The town is famous for being one of the major centres of oil production in Syria. The first oil exploration works in Rmelan started in 1934. However, the town was founded in 1956 along with the discovery of the first oil well in the region in Karatchok. Later in 1959, the al-Suwaydiyah oil field was also discovered.

The town has a well-developed infrastructure, including 22 km of roads, public parks, swimming pools, family clubs, cinema halls, and cultural centres. The Town has a large airport, originally a small agricultural airport called Abu Hajar Airport. It is now used by the United States for military and civilian purposes. The town is also home to the Ommal Rmelan (Rmelan Labours) football club. They participate in the third division of the Syrian Football League and play their home games at the Rmelan Municipal Stadium. The population of the town is of mixed Arab, Kurd, and Assyrian ethnicities. Many workers from other Syrian regions also reside in Rmelan. The constitutional conferences of the Democratic Federal System of Northern Syria in 2014 and in 2016 were held in Rmelan.

== Notable residents ==
- Bahzad Sulaiman
