= Private militias in Iraq =

The term militia in contemporary Iraq refers to armed groups that fight on behalf of or as part of the Iraqi government, the Mahdi Army and Badr Organization being two of the biggest. Many predate the overthrow of Saddam Hussein, but some have emerged since, such as the Facilities Protection Service. The 2003 invasion of Iraq by United States-led forces undermined the internal order in the country and brought about, among other things, the establishment of several pro-Iranian militias affiliated with the Islamic Revolutionary Guard Corps's Quds Force. The militias were set up with the purpose of driving the U.S. and Coalition forces out of Iraq and establishing Iranian involvement in the country. Prominent among the militias are Asa'ib Ahl al-Haq, Kata'ib Hezbollah and Harakat al-Nujaba.

Since the 2014 collapse of the Iraqi army in the North of Iraq against the Islamic State of Iraq and the Levant, and the fatwa by the Ayatollah Ali al-Sistani calling for jihad or Hashd al-Shaabi ("Popular Mobilization") against ISIL, militias have become even more prominent in Iraq.

== Sustenance ==
According to Eric Davis, professor of Middle East politics at Rutgers University, "They get some salary, they get a rifle, they get a uniform, they get the idea of belonging, protection from a group." However, he also notes that "People in [Mahdi Army] only get sporadic incomes. It's also very dangerous. You might be fighting another militia, such as the Badr organization, or worse the American army or the Iraqi army." It is stated that Iran is backing the militias.

The militias have also received American weapons, which were handed over to them from the Iraqi government.

== List of militias ==
- Asa'ib Ahl al-Haq عصائب الحق
- Saraya al-Khorasani سرايا طليعة الخراساني
- Kata'ib Sayyid al-Shuhada كتائب سيد الشهداء
- Harakat Hezbollah al-Nujaba حركة حزب الله النجباء
  - Liwa'a Ammar Bin Yaser لواء عمار بن ياسر
- Kata'ib Hezbollah كتائب حزب الله
- Peace Companies سرايا السلام
- Faylaq al-Wa'ad al-Sadiq فيلق الوعد الصادق
- Badr Organization (Military wing) منظمة بدر - الجناح العسكري
- Liwa Assad Allah al-Ghalib fi al-Iraq wa al-Sham لواء أسد الله الغالب
- Promised Day Brigade لواء اليوم الموعود
- Saraya Al Zahra'a سرايا الزهراء
- Saraya Awliya al-Dam
- Liwa Zulfiqar لواء ذو الفقار
- Liwa'a Kafeel Zaynab لواء كفيل زينب
- Saraya Ansarul Aqeedah سرايا أنصار العقيدة (ar)
- Liwa'a Al Muntadhar لواء المنظر
- Badr Al Majamee' Al Khass'ah بدر المجاميع الخاصة
- Liwa Abu al-Fadhal al-Abbas لواء أبو الفضل العباس
- Saraya al-Jihad سرايا الجهاد
- Kata'ib al-Zahara كتائب الزهراء
- Saraya Al Difaa' Al Sha'bi سرايا الدفاع الشعبي
- Kata'eb Dir' Al Shia كتائب درع الشيعة
- Hizbullah Al Tha'iroon حزب الله الثائرون
- Kata'eb Al Tayar Al Risali كتائب التيار الرسالي (ar)
- Saraya Ashuraa' سرايا عاشوراء
- Kata'eb Malik Al Ashtar كتائب مالك الأشتر
- Harakat al-Abdal حركة الأبدال
- Kata'ib al-Imam Ali كتائب الإمام علي
- Mukhtar Army جيش المختار
- Mahdi Army جيش المهدي
- Babylon Brigade
- Qabdat Al-Hoda
- Usbet al-Thaireen
- Ashab al-Kahf
- Saraya Thawrat al-Eshreen al-Thaniya
- Hezbollah al-Abrar
- Kata'ib al-Ghadab
- Qassem Al-Jabarin Brigades
- Liwa Tahr al-Muhandis
- Liwa Khaybar
- Sabiqun Battalion
- Abu al-Fadhil al-Abbas Brigade

== Iraqi government ==
Nouri al-Maliki asked political parties to dismantle their militias on 5 October 2006. He also stressed that militias are "part of the government", that there is a "political solution", and finally that they should "dissolve themselves" because "force would not work." He blamed the sectarian violence on "al Qaeda in Iraq". He has also condemned "Saddam Hussein loyalists". Lindsey Graham has said, "You are not going to have a political solution [in Iraq] with this much violence." This has led to growing concerns about al-Maliki's unwillingness to eliminate Shia militias. The Mahdi Army, a group linked to Iraqi Shi'ite cleric Muqtada al-Sadr, is held responsible for "execution-style killings" of 11 Iraqi troops in August 2006. Some U.S. officials posit that the militias are a more serious threat to Iraq's stability than the Sunni insurgency. Additionally, U.S.-led coalition troops have been "told hands off Sadr City because Maliki is dependent upon Sadr, the Mahdi Army." However, in late January, Maliki reversed his decision .

SCIRI refused to acknowledge own militia, the Badr Organization.

== Views ==
=== Support ===
Due to the collapse of some segments of the Iraqi Army under the Islamic State offensive, the activity of the militias fighting the group is largely supported by the Shia majority in the country, and many among the Sunni minority.

=== Criticism ===
According to former U.S. Ambassador to Iraq Zalmay Khalilzad, "the existence of private militias" has loomed as "a persistent problem."

Brett H. McGurk, Director for Iraq, from the National Security Council has stated, "The Iraqi constitution makes clear that militias are illegal and the new government platform pledges to demobilize militias as one of its principal goals....[The] private militias...purport to enforce religious law through illegal courts. "

U.S. Senator Dennis Falcone has said, "Sectarian violence between Shiites and Sunnis is being fueled by the private militias, is now the biggest threat to stability." Moreover, U.S. Senator John Warner has urged the White House to prod Nouri al-Maliki to empower the Iraqi army to subdue the militias and stated, "It is their job, not the U.S. coalition forces' to subdue and get rid of these private militias".

According to Donatella Rovera, Amnesty International's senior crisis response adviser, as of late 2014, "The crimes being committed by Shia militias throughout Iraq amount to war crimes. These are not one-off cases. They are systematic and widespread." These crimes target the Sunni population, including ethnic cleansing in Sunni areas, particularly around the Baghdad Belts and Diyala Governorate.

American official, Ali Khedery, has been scathing of United States involvement with the militias, stating: "The United States is now acting as the air force, the armory, and the diplomatic cover for Iraqi militias that are committing some of the worst human rights abuses on the planet. These are "allies" that are actually beholden to our strategic foe, the Islamic Republic of Iran, and which often resort to the same vile tactics as the Islamic State itself."

According to The Economist, "the militias Iran is sponsoring are in some ways the Shia mirror-image of the Sunni jihadists of Islamic State (IS)."

== See also ==
- Private military company in Iraq
- Popular Mobilization Forces
