= Attacks on the United States (2000–present) =

The United States has been attacked several times throughout its history including attacks on its states and territories, embassies and consulates, and on its military. Attacks against the United States include invasions, military offensives, raids, bombardment and airstrikes on its military, non-domestic terrorist bombings and shootings, destruction of infrastructure, and any other deliberate act of violence against the United States government or military.

The most recent attack against the United States was by Iran on July 17, 2026, amid the 2026 Iran war’s Iranian strikes on Jordan. Two Iranian ballistic missiles struck the Muwaffaq Salti Air Base in Jordan, killing two American service members, injuring more than four others, and left one missing. The missiles targeted troop housing on the base, and caused a fire large enough to be detected by NASA’s FIRMS fire detection satellites. On July 18, an American service member was killed during a "controlled detonation" of unexploded ordnance from a downed Iranian drone after being struck by shrapnel.

== 2000–2009 ==
=== USS Cole bombing (October 2000) ===
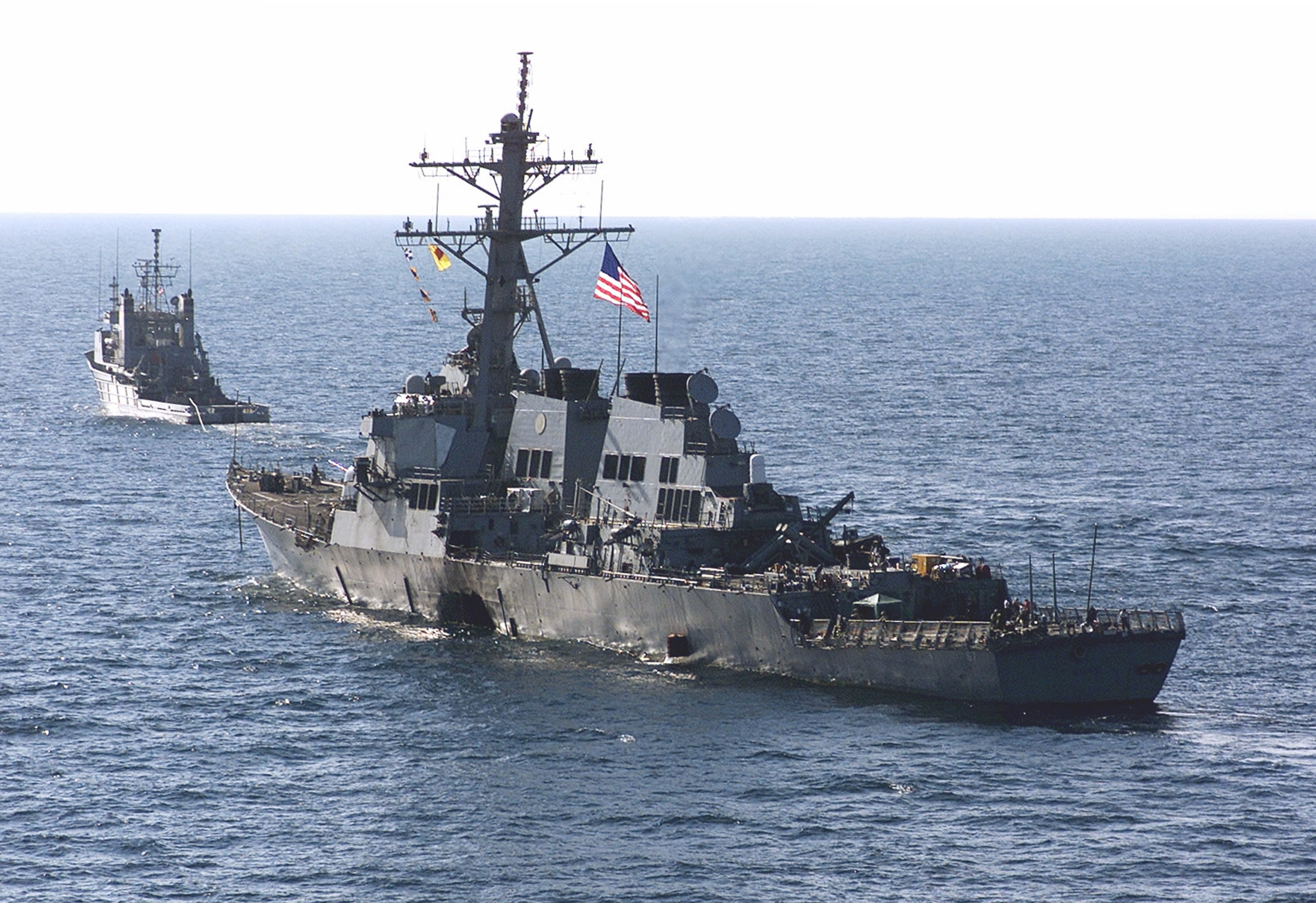
The USNS Catawba towing the USS Cole after the bombing

Part of the al-Qaeda insurgency in Yemen – On October 12, 2000, while refueling at Yemen's Aden harbor, two members of al-Qaeda launched a suicide attack against the USS Cole, a guided missile destroyer in the United States Navy. While docked, a small fiberglass boat carrying C-4 explosives and two suicide bombers approached the port side of the destroyer and exploded, creating a 40-by-60-foot (12 by 18 m) gash in the ship's port side, killing 17 sailors and injuring 37 others. On March 14, 2007, a federal judge in the United States, Robert G. Doumar, ruled that the Sudanese government was liable for the bombing. In March 2015, U.S. federal judge Rudolph Contreras found both Iran and Sudan complicit in the 2000 bombing of the USS Cole by al Qaeda, stating that "Iran was directly involved in establishing Al-Qaeda's Yemen network and supported training and logistics for Al-Qaeda in the Gulf region" through Hezbollah. Two previous federal judges had ruled that Sudan was liable for its role in the attack, but Contreras's "ruling is the first to find Iran partly responsible for the incident."

=== September 11 attacks (September 2001) ===
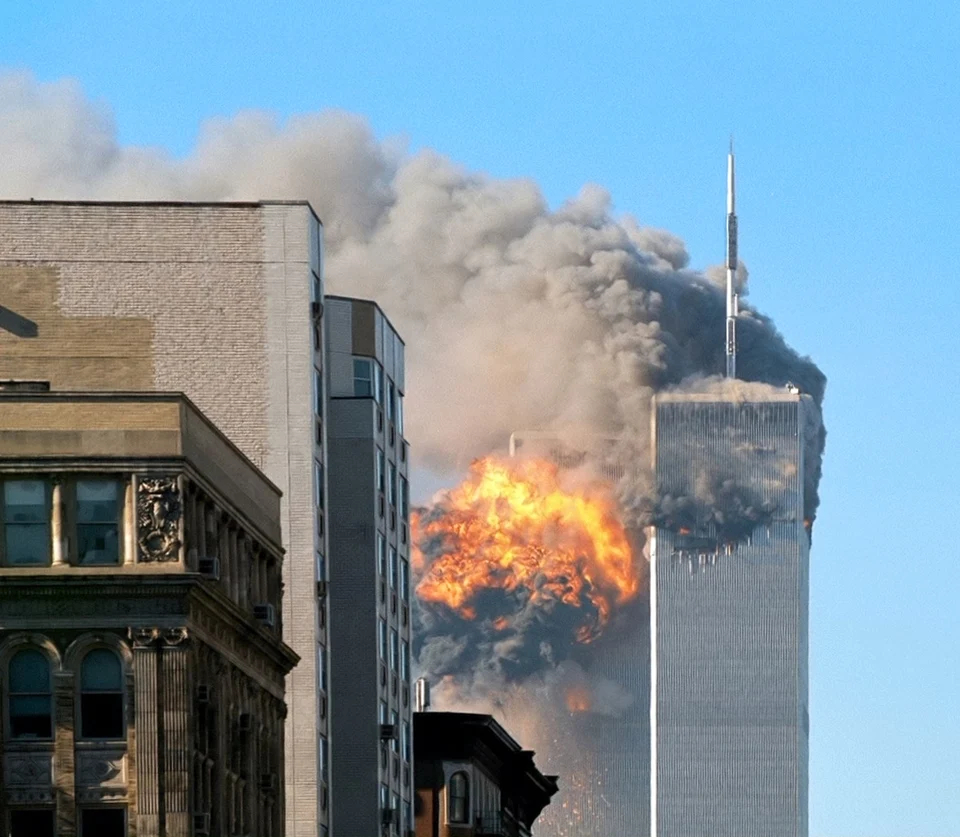
Flight 175 crashes into the south tower

On the morning of September 11, 2001, nineteen Islamic extremists hijacked four aircraft, murdered several passengers, and took control of the aircraft with intent to fly them into pre-selected targets, located at the World Trade Center in New York City, and The Pentagon in Virginia. American Airlines Flight 11 was flown into 1 World Trade Center; the building immediately caught on fire and collapsed as a result over an hour later, resulting in the deaths of up to 1,000 people. United Airlines Flight 175 was flown into 2 World Trade Center a short time later, killing everyone on board and hundreds more within the building. American Airlines Flight 77 struck The Pentagon, killing everyone in the plane and 125 people within the building. Passengers of United Airlines Flight 93 fought the hijackers, who ran the aircraft into the ground, killing everyone on board. The attacks are the deadliest instances of terrorism in modern world history.

=== War in Afghanistan (October 2001–August 2021) ===
Date(s)	Location	Type of attack	Details	U.S. Deaths
March 29, 2006	Helmand province, Afghanistan	Attack	Part of the War in Afghanistan (2001–2021) –	1
February 27, 2007	Bagram, Afghanistan	Suicide attack, assassination attempt	Part of the War in Afghanistan (2001–2021) –	2
March 4, 2007	Shinwar District, Afghanistan	Suicide attack	Part of the War in Afghanistan (2001–2021) –	0
July 13, 2008	Waygal district, Afghanistan	Attack	Part of the War in Afghanistan (2001–2021) –	9
September 25, 2011	Kabul, Afghanistan	Attack	An Afghan employee opened fire inside an Embassy Annex compound, killing one American and wounding three others before being shot and killed.	1
June 25, 2013	Kabul, Afghanistan	Attack	Suicide insurgents initiated a failed assault on the embassy, engaging Afghan security forces and Local Guard Force personnel in a firefight. All perpetrators were killed.	0
September 13, 2013	Herat, Afghanistan	Attack		0
June 9, 2014	Zabul Province, Afghanistan	Friendly fire	Part of the War in Afghanistan –	5
August 26, 2021	Kabul, Afghanistan	Suicide attack, Terrorism	Part of the War in Afghanistan (2001–2021) –	13

=== Attack on American cultural centre in Kolkata (January 2002) ===
On January 22, 2002, armed militants carried out an attack on the American Center in Kolkata, India. The attackers, riding motorcycles, opened fire on the facility's security personnel using automatic weapons, killing five police officers and injuring at least 20 others. The attack occurred during the early morning hours, targeting the heavily guarded entrance.

The assailants were linked to Harkat-ul-Jihad al-Islami, an Islamist extremist group operating in South Asia. Authorities identified Aftab Ansari, an Indian gangster with ties to Pakistani and Bangladeshi terror networks, as the mastermind behind the attack. Ansari was later captured in Dubai and extradited to India, where he and others involved faced prosecution.

=== Consulate in Denpasar bombing (October 2002) ===
On October 12, 2002, a bomb detonated outside the U.S. consulate office in Denpasar, Bali, Indonesia as part of the Paddy's and Sari nightclubs bombings in Kuta.

=== Mortar attack on American Embassy in Monrovia (July 2003) ===
On July 21st, 2003, several mortar shells struck the American embassy compound in Monrovia, resulting in two Liberians and two Americans being injured. It is unknown if this attack was targeted.

=== Embassy in Tashkent bombing (June 2004) ===
On June 30, 2004, Islamic Movement of Uzbekistan bombs embassy.

=== Attack on the diplomatic compound in Jeddah (December 2004) ===
On December 6, 2004, al-Qaeda gunmen raid diplomatic compound.

=== Attack on the Embassy in Damascus (September 2006) ===
On September 12, 2006, gunmen attempt to raid the american embassy of Damascus and are shot dead by Syrian security forces.

=== Embassy in Athens bombing (January 2007) ===
On January 12, 2007, RPG fired at embassy by Revolutionary Struggle.

=== Embassy in Casablanca bombing (April 2007) ===
On April 14, 2007, two suicide bombers detonated their explosive devices across the street from the consulate general and in front of the Consulate General's public diplomacy facility and language center. Only the bombers were killed.

=== Attacks on the embassy in Sana'a (March 2008 - January 2009) ===
Date(s)	Location	Type of attack	Details	U.S. Deaths
March 18, 2008	Sana'a, Yemen	Bombing	Mortar rounds missed embassy, hitting nearby school.	0
September 17, 2008	Sana'a, Yemen	Attack		1

=== Attack on the consulate in Istanbul (July 2008) ===
On July 9, 2008, a coordinated terrorist attack targeted the U.S. consulate in Istanbul, Turkey. Three gunmen armed with automatic weapons and a vehicle approached the consulate's entrance, opening fire at Turkish security personnel stationed outside. A prolonged firefight ensued, leading to the deaths of three Turkish police officers and all three attackers. The gunmen were later identified as members of an Al-Qaeda-linked network, motivated by extremist ideology and seeking to target U.S. diplomatic interests. Turkish authorities arrested multiple individuals believed to be associated with the planning and support of the attack.

=== Attack on the embassy in Managua (October 2009) ===
On October 30, 2009, several hundred supporters from the Sandinista National Liberation Front protesting "U.S. interventionism" swarm the embassy compound, attacking personnel and vandalizing property for four hours.

== 2010–2019 ==
=== Consulate bombing in Peshawar (April 2010) ===
On April 5, 2010, multiple coordinated attacks struck the North-West Frontier Province (now Khyber Pakhtunkhwa) in Pakistan, resulting in significant casualties. The first incident occurred when a suicide bomber detonated an explosive-laden vehicle at the U.S. consulate in Peshawar, killing four Pakistani security personnel and injuring over a dozen. The assault involved gunfire and rocket attacks, attributed to the Tehrik-i-Taliban Pakistan (TTP), an Islamist militant group aiming to target foreign interests.

Simultaneously, another suicide bombing targeted a political rally in Timergara, in the Lower Dir District. The explosion killed at least 45 people and injured over 80. The rally was organized by the Awami National Party (ANP), a secular political group opposing the Taliban's influence in the region.

=== Attempted embassy bombing in Tbilisi (September 2010) ===
On September 22, 2010, an explosive device was detonated near the exterior of the American embassy in Tbilisi, with a second device later being recovered nearby and disabled by Georgian police. No claims of responsibility or casualties were reported; however, a leaked classified summary report from the CIA in 2011 concluded Russia's GRU was ultimately responsible for the bombing.

=== Attack on embassy in Sarajevo (October 2011) ===
On October 28, 2011, a Wahhabi Islamist gunman, fired on the embassy, resulting in one local policeman guarding the embassy being wounded in the arm by the gunman, while the shooter was wounded by a police sniper.

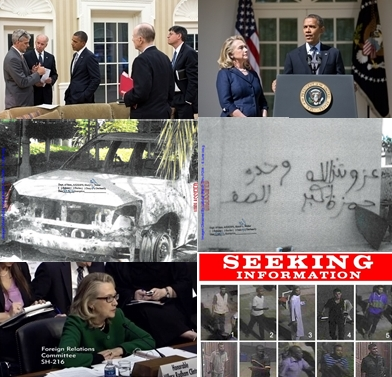

=== Benghazi attack (September 2012) ===
On September 11, 2012, heavily armed militants attacked the U.S. diplomatic mission in Benghazi, Libya, and a nearby CIA annex. The assault unfolded in two waves, beginning with a coordinated assault on the mission, resulting in the deaths of U.S. Ambassador J. Christopher Stevens and Information Management Officer Sean Smith. Hours later, the attackers targeted the CIA annex, leading to the deaths of two security contractors, Glen Doherty and Tyrone Woods. The attackers were linked to Islamist militant groups, possibly including Ansar al-Sharia.

The incident sparked significant controversy in the U.S. over the adequacy of security measures, the response of the U.S. government, and the initial public statements made about the attack's cause. It also led to multiple congressional investigations and the capture of a suspect, Ahmed Abu Khattala, who was later convicted in U.S. federal court for his role in the attack.

=== Embassy in Ankara bombing (February 2013) ===
On February 1, 2013, a suicide bombing targeted the U.S. embassy in Ankara, Turkey. The attacker, Ecevit Şanlı, a member of the far-left Revolutionary People's Liberation Party-Front (DHKP-C), detonated explosives at the embassy's security checkpoint. The blast killed a Turkish security guard, Mustafa Akarsu, and injured three others, including a Turkish journalist.

The attack was attributed to the DHKP-C, known for its opposition to U.S. and NATO influence in Turkey and its history of violent acts. Şanlı, the bomber, was identified as a former convict with a history of involvement in leftist militancy. The group later claimed responsibility, describing the attack as retaliation against U.S. policies in the Middle East and its perceived role in global imperialism.

=== Embassy in Tashkent bombing (September 2015) ===
On September 28, 2015, an unidentified man threw two Molotov cocktails or similar improvised explosives on the grounds of the embassy with one of them detonating. Shortly thereafter, the embassy went into lockdown with security presence increasing after it reopened. No one was injured in the attack.

=== Embassy in Podgorica bombing (February 2018) ===
On February 21, 2018, a pro-Russian and Serbian-born assailant threw a hand grenade over the wall of the embassy. Reporting indicated the grenade appeared to detonate as it was thrown into the air, and the man detonated a second device that killed him. The man's body was found 100 feet (30 m) from the embassy wall.

=== Embassy in Beijing bombing (July 2018) ===
On July 26, 2018, an unidentified 26-year-old man set off explosive device outside the embassy.

=== Consulate in Guadalajara bombing (December 2018) ===
On December 1, 2018, the American consulate in Guadalajara was targeted by an unidentified assailant who threw a grenade towards it.

=== 2019 Iranian shoot-down of American drone ===
On June 20, 2019, Iran shot down a United States RQ-4A Global Hawk BAMS-D surveillance drone, over the Strait of Hormuz.

== 2020–present ==
=== Attack on the embassy in Yangon (March 2021) ===
On March 27, 2021, a shooting occurred at the United States Embassy in Yangon, Myanmar.

=== Attempted embassy mail bombing in Madrid (December 2022) ===
On December 1, 2022.

=== Middle Eastern crisis (October 2023–present) ===
Date(s)	Location	Type of attack	Details	U.S. Deaths
October 17, 2023	Al-Asad Airbase, Al Anbar Governorate, Iraq	Drone strike	Main article: 17 October 2023 attack on al-Asad Airbase Part of the Iran–Israel proxy conflict – Iraqi militants launched a drone strike on the American al-Asad Airbase in northern Iraq. The airstrike was intercepted. The next day, a false alarm in the airbase caused the death of a civilian contractor from cardiac arrest.	0
October 18, 2023	Al-Tanf, Homs Governorate, Syria	Drone strike	Main article: 18 October 2023 attack on Al-Tanf Part of the Iran–Israel proxy conflict – A drone strike by an Iranian proxy on the American al-Tanf garrison resulted in over 20 injuries.	0
November 1, 2023	Al-Tanf, Homs Governorate, Syria	Drone strike	Main article: 1 November 2023 attack on Al-Tanf Part of the Iran–Israel proxy conflict – A minor drone strike was reported at the American al-Tanf garrison.	0
November 20, 2023	Al-Asad Airbase, Al Anbar Governorate, Iraq	Ballistic missile strike	Main article: 20 November 2023 attack on Al-Asad Airbase Part of the Iran–Israel proxy conflict – Eight American and coalition soldiers were injured from a ballistic missile attack, and there was minor infrastructural damage after the Al-Asad Airbase was attacked by a ballistic missile.	0
December 8, 2023	Baghdad, Iraq	Artillery strikes	Approximately seven mortar rounds landed in the U.S. Embassy compound in Baghdad	0
December 23, 2023	Southern Red Sea	Airstrike	Main article: 2023 attack on the USS Laboon Part of the Red Sea crisis –	0
January 10, 2024	Southern Red Sea	Airstrikes	Main article: January 2024 Houthi attack on the United States Navy Part of the Red Sea crisis –	0
January 20, 2024	Al-Asad Airbase, Al Anbar Governorate, Iraq	Missile strikes	Main article: 20 January 2024 attack on Al-Asad Airbase Part of the Iran–Israel proxy conflict – The Islamic Resistance in Iraq claimed responsibility for striking the American Al-Asad Airbase with dozens of missiles which injured several US military personnel and an Iraqi service member. At 6:30 p.m. Baghdad time, the IRI launched multiple ballistic missiles and other rockets at the Al-Asad Airbase. The United States military attempted to defend the base with Patriot missiles. More than 15 MIM-104 Patriot missiles were launched to defend the base.	0
January 28, 2024	Rukban, Jordan	Drone strike	Main article: Tower 22 drone attack Part of the Iran–Israel proxy conflict –	3
August 5, 2024	Al-Asad Airbase, Al Anbar Governorate, Iraq	Missile strikes	Main article: 5 August 2024 attack on Al-Asad Airbase Part of the Iran–Israel proxy conflict – A missile attack targeted the American Al-Asad Airbase in western Iraq, resulting in injuries to at least five US servicemembers and two contractors. The attack involved the firing of two Katyusha rockets, which landed inside the base. One of the injured servicemembers sustained serious injuries. The incident is seen as a potential escalation in the ongoing tensions between Iran and the United States.	2
August 9, 2024	Rumalyn Landing Zone, Syria	Drone strike	Main article: August 2024 attack on the Rumalyn Landing Zone Part of the Iran–Israel proxy conflict – A kamikaze drone struck the U.S. military base Rumalyn Landing Zone in eastern Syria, injuring eight U.S. soldiers.	0
August 13, 2024	Mission Support Site Conoco, Deir ez-Zor Governorate, Syria	Missile strikes	Main article: August 2024 attack on the United States in Syria Part of the Iran–Israel proxy conflict – Six rockets targeted an American airbase in Deir ez-Zor Governorate fell near the facility. As a response to the strike, US-led coalition launched artillery strikes.	0
September 10, 2024	Camp Victory, Baghdad, Iraq	Missile strikes	Main article: September 2024 attack on Camp Victory Part of the Iran–Israel proxy conflict – Two rockets exploded in the vicinity of American personnel stationed in Camp Victory, near Baghdad International Airport. No casualties were reported. Jaafar al-Husseini, the spokesperson of Kata'ib Hezbollah, said that the attack aimed to disrupt Iranian president Masoud Pezeshkian's visit to Baghdad, which was scheduled the following day.	0
December 1, 2024	Gulf of Aden	Missile and Drone strikes	Main article: 1 December 2024 attack on the United States Navy Part of the Red Sea crisis – Between November 30–December 1, 2024, the U.S. Arleigh Burke-class guided missile destroyers USS Stockdale and USS O'Kane, were escorting three American owned, operated, and flagged merchant vessels across the Gulf of Aden. During the voyage, the Yemen-based Houthis launched three anti-ship ballistic missile, three one-way attack drones, and one anti-ship cruise missile towards the five American ships. The two destroyers engaged and shot down all seven projectiles, resulting in no damage to any of the ships. The Houthis released a statement saying they were targeting "three supply ships belonging to the American army in the Arabian Sea and the Gulf of Aden".	0
December 9–10, 2024	Gulf of Aden	Missile and Drone strikes	Main article: 10 December 2024 attack on the United States Navy Part of the Red Sea crisis – Between December 9–10, 2024, the U.S. Arleigh Burke-class guided missile destroyers USS Stockdale and USS O'Kane, were escorting three American owned, operated, and flagged merchant vessels across the Gulf of Aden. During the voyage, the Yemen-based Houthis launched multiple one-way attack drones and one anti-ship cruise missile towards the five American ships. The two destroyers engaged and shot down all projectiles, resulting in no damage to any of the ships.	0
December 22, 2024	Red Sea	Missile / Friendly fire	Part of the Red Sea crisis On December 22, the U.S. Ticonderoga-class guided-missile cruiser USS Gettysburg shot down a U.S. F/A-18 Super Hornet in an accidental friendly fire attack.	0

=== 2025 US Embassy Shooting in Haiti ===
On November 13, 2025 the United States Embassy complex in Tabarre at Port-au-Prince, Haiti was shot at by suspected militia-men. Marines returned fire and the attackers retreated.
