= Al-Thawriyyun group =

Militant organization in Iraq and Syria

- جماعة الثوريون
- Founded: July 25, 2024
- Dates active: 2024 — 2025
- Country: Iraq
- Allegiance: Islamic Resistance in Iraq
- Active regions: Iraq; Syria
- Ideology: Shiism
- Status: Inactive
- Part of: Axis of Resistance
- Wars: Middle Eastern crisis (2023–present); Attacks on US bases during the Gaza war
- Website: Telegram channel

The Al-Thawriyyun group (Arabic: جماعة الثوريون, romanized: jamaeat althawriuwn, lit. 'Revolutionary group') was a small pro-Iranian militant organization which active in Iraq and Syria.

== History ==
=== Activities ===
The group was founded on July 25, 2024 in Iraq after launching rockets at Conoco and Al-Asad Airbase in the Attacks on US bases during the Gaza war belonging to the Islamic Resistance in Iraq, according to the group, the attacks were called "Ya Ali al-Murtadha" and "Ya Fatima al-Zahra", no damage was done to the base.

On August 5, 2024, the group launched attacks on Al-Asad Airbase, Iraqi Forces subsequently arrested 5 people related to the attack, injuring 5 people.

On October 27, 2025, the group claimed to have carried out a drone and rocket attack against US forces in the Al Tanf garrison.

=== Situation ===
According to Ahmed Al-Abidi, the group is a facade for the Kata'ib Hezbollah, such as Ashab al-Kahf and Liwa Thar al-Muhandis.

After the group claimed responsibility for the attacks on Al-Asad Airbase, the group disappeared and has remained inactive since 2025.
