= Abbas Shield Martyrdom Forces =

Shia Iraqi militia group

- قوات درع عباس الاستشهادية
- Founding leader: Karar Fatah al Subihawi
- Dates active: 15 March 2025 – present (1 year, 3 months and 1 week)
- Country: Iraq
- Ideology: Qutbism–Khomeinism; Jihadism
- Size: 40,000
- Wars: Syrian conflict (2024–present); Western Syria clashes (December 2024–present); Hezbollah–Syria clashes (2024–present); Yemeni civil war (2014–present); March 2025 United States attacks in Yemen (Statements)

Abbas Shield Martyrdom Forces (Arabic: قوات درع عباس الاستشهادية, romanized: Quwat Dera'a Al-Abbas Al-Ishtishadiyah, lit. 'Abbas Shield Martyrdom Forces') (Note: Also called Abbas Shield Martyrdom Forces Brigades and Shield Abbas Martyrdom Brigades Forces) is a Shia Iraqi Militant group.

== History ==
=== Foundation ===
The group was formed on 15 March 2025, calling on Iraqis and Iranian-backed Popular Mobilization Forces members to join the "Jihadist Project". It claimed on 17 March that 40,000 people have submitted membership applications. Iraqi media reported that the group's leader, Karar Fatah al Subihawi, has previously attended Popular Mobilization Forces events and was connected to Wathiq al-Battat, the former leader of Iranian-backed Iraqi militia Mukhtar Army and a senior official in Iranian-backed Iraqi militia Kata'ib Hezbollah. Subihawi reportedly remained in Damascus, Syria, after the collapse of the Assad regime to "liberate" the Sayyida Zaynab Shrine from the Syrian Interim Government.

=== Activities ===
In a video clip featuring the image of the former leader of the Lebanese Hezbollah group Sayyed Hassan Nasrallah, Abbas Martyrdom Shield Forces, Ya Ali Popular Formations and the Kataib Sarkhat al-Quds have threatened to take action in Syria and against the United States. The Abbas Martyrdom Forces stated it would launch "martyrdom operations" to "free Syria" and attack American interests for recent strikes upon Yemen's Houthis.

The group is assumed to have connections to the Islamic Resistance in Iraq, a collection of pro-Iran PMF factions, such as Asa'ib Ahl al-Haq, Kataib Hezbollah, Harakat Hezbollah al-Nujaba, and others. The IRI is accused of using front organizations to avoid accountability and Western retribution.

In April 2025, the group recruit Christian, Sunni, Kurdish, and Shiite fighters, taking them to Syria, Yemen, Palestine and a final location that would be announced, the group also claimed an attack on the Security Forces, on the border with Lebanon, killing 4 members. In March 2026, during the 2026 Iran war, the group swore allegiance to Harakat Hezbollah al-Nujaba, changing the name of the Telegram group to "Al-Nujaba Baghdad Al-Rusafa Office".

== See also ==
- Kataib Sarkhat al-Quds – other Iraqi faction that declared against the US attacks in Yemen and the first Syrian transitional government
- United Council of Sheikhs and Notables of Basra and Iraq - other Iraqi faction that declared against sectarian violence in Syria and the first Syrian transitional government.
