= United Council of Sheikhs and Notables of Basra and Iraq =

Tribal committee in Basra

- المجلس الموحد لشيوخ وأعيان البصرة والعراق
- Spokesperson: Ali al-Salim
- Dates active: 24 December 2014 – present
- Country: Iraq
- Headquarters: Basra
- Ideology: Shia Islamism
- Part of: Basra Provincial Council
- Wars: War in Iraq (2013–2017); Syrian Civil War; Western Syria clashes (December 2024–present)

The United Council of Sheikhs and Notables of Basra and Iraq (Arabic: المجلس الموحد لشيوخ وأعيان البصرة والعراق) is an Arab tribal group opposed to the Syrian transitional government.

== History ==
On July 11, 2024 the Basra Provincial Council's Security Committee gave mandate to the group, to represent the entirety of Basra Governorate. The group has received attention amid regional tensions, criticizing the Iraqi government for its perceived inaction in addressing instability in the Middle East, citing sectarian violence in Syria as a catalyst for its formation.

In its early activities, the council declared a mobilization effort in Baghdad, urging the Iraqi Government to adopt a stronger stance against Hayat Tahrir al-Sham (HTS), a designated terrorist group operating in Syria. It further emphasized the readiness of Basrawi tribes to defend Iraqi holy sites, framing this as a response to regional instability. The council also advocated for the Popular Mobilization Forces (PMF) to be heavily armed, describing them as a necessary "protective shield" for Iraqi sovereignty.

In a controversial statement, the council accused Türkiye, Saudi Arabia, and Jordan of empowering "takfiris and terrorist organizations in Syria," alleging that these states enabled HTS leader Abu Mohammad al-Julani's faction to commit "the most brutal crimes".

== See also ==
Other Iraqi organizations against Syrian transitional government:

- Guardians of Truth Battalions
- Ya Ali Popular Formations
- Abbas Shield Martyrdom Forces
- Kataib Sarkhat al-Quds
