= Tower 22 drone attack =

2024 attack on a US military outpost in Jordan

Coordinates: 33°18′51″N 38°42′12″E

- Part of attacks on US bases during the Gaza war and the Middle Eastern crisis (2023–present)
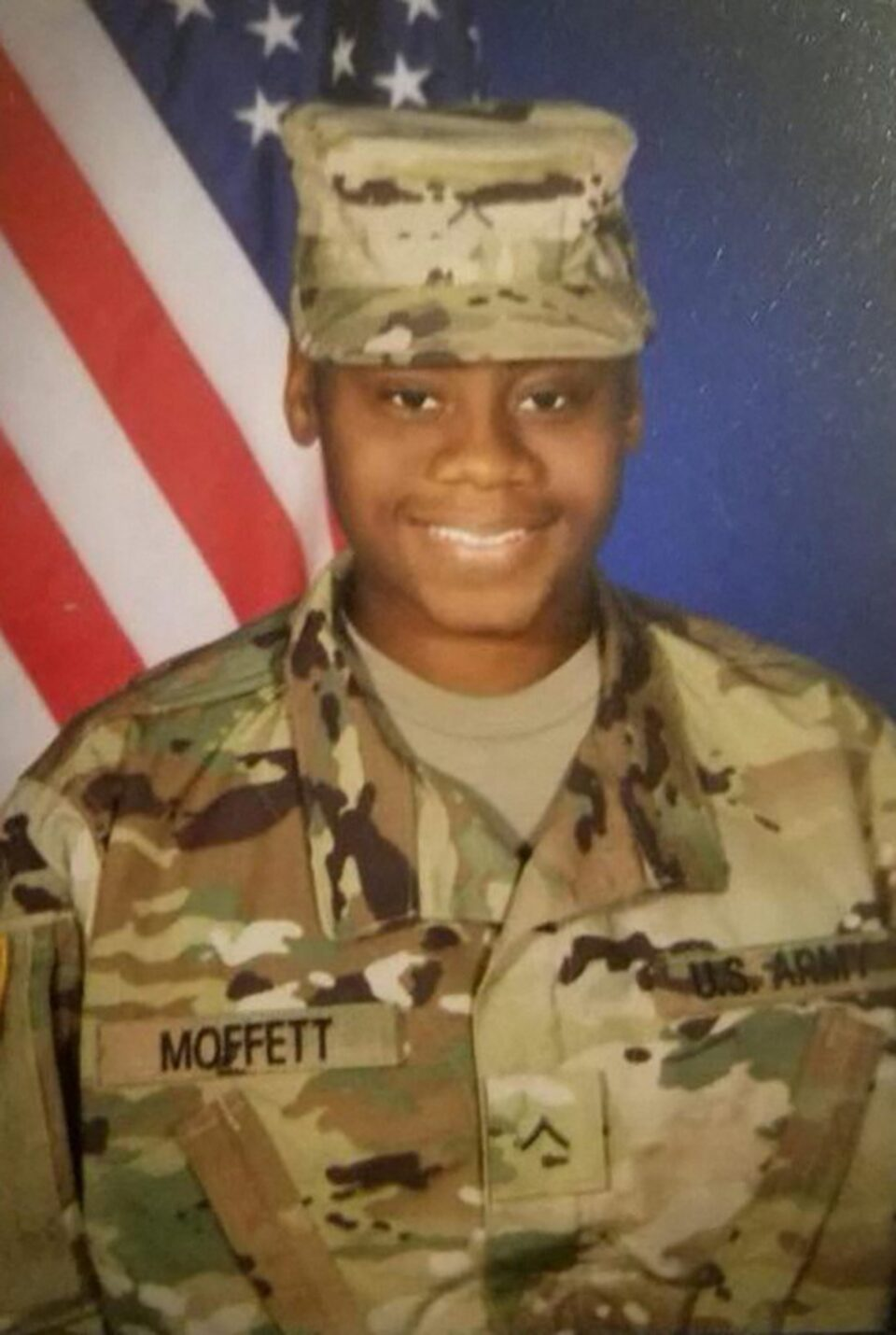
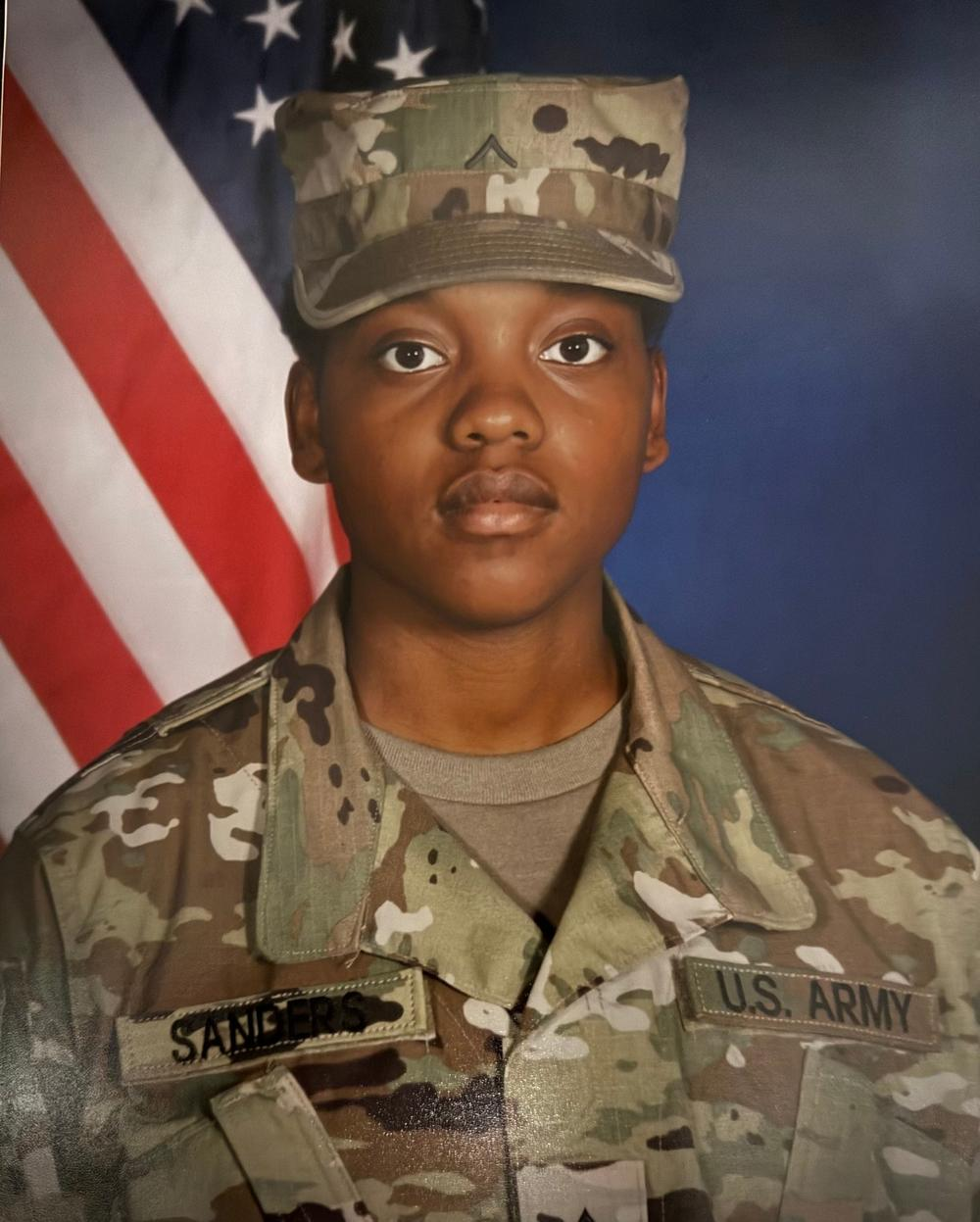
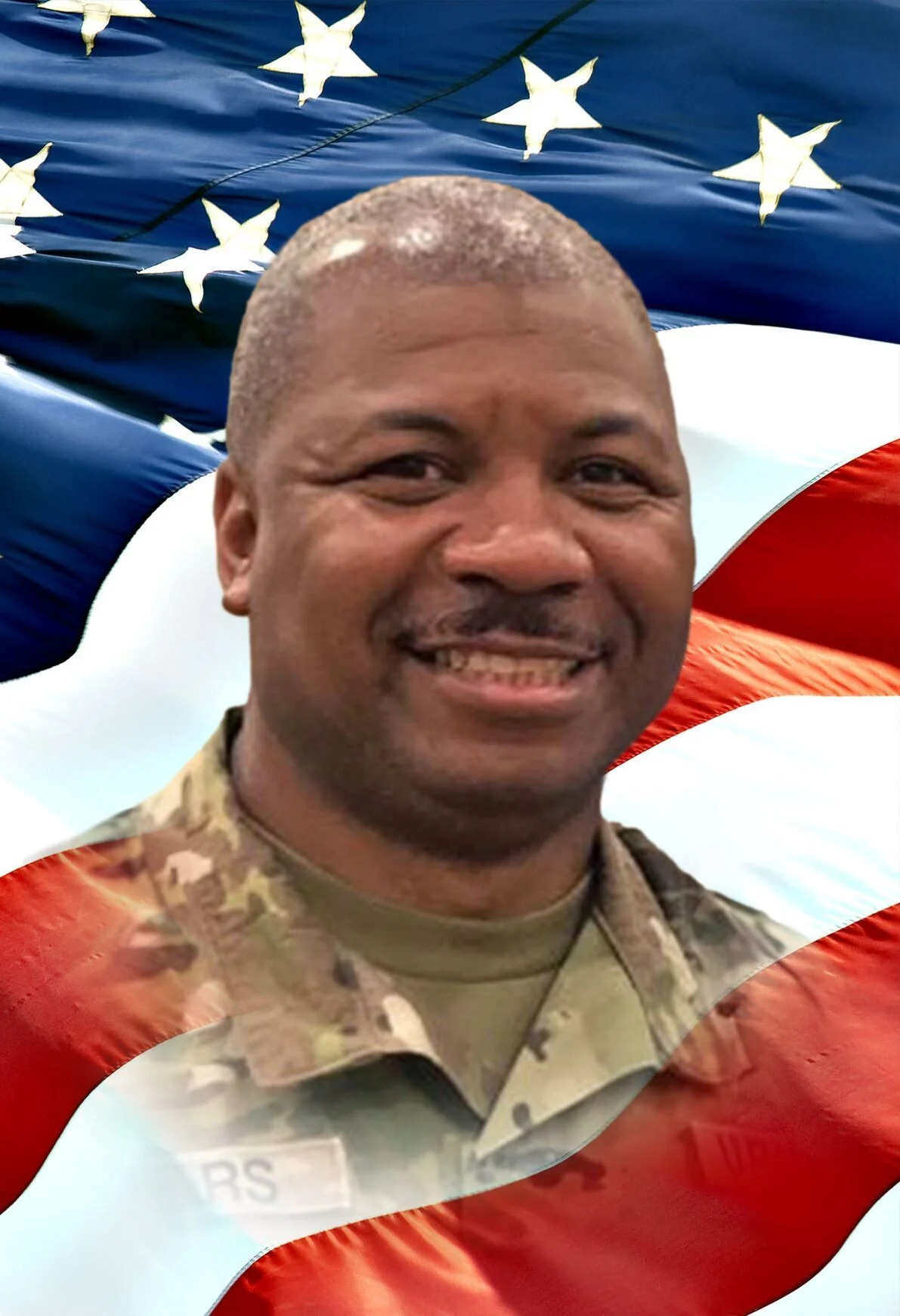
- American soldiers killed in the attack (left to right: Specialist Breonna Alexsondria Moffett, Specialist Kennedy Ladon Sanders, Sergeant William Jerome Rivers)
- Type: Exploding drone strike
- Location: Rukban, Jordan
- Target: Tower 22 US military base
- Date: 28 January 2024 (UTC+3)
- Executed by: Ansar Allah al-Awfiya, Islamic Resistance in Iraq
- Casualties: 3 killed 47 injured
- Tower 22 in Jordan

On 28 January 2024, the Islamic Resistance in Iraq, an Iranian-backed Shia Iraqi militia coalition, launched an attack drone, striking Tower 22, a U.S. military outpost in Rukban, northeast Jordan. The explosion killed three U.S. soldiers and injured 47 others. The incident marked the first time U.S. troops were killed by enemy fire since the start of the Gaza war. Iran denied any involvement in the attack.

The U.S. conducted retaliatory strikes against Iranian personnel and facilities in Iraq and Syria on 2 February. According to the Syrian Observatory for Human Rights, at least 35 Iran-backed militants were killed in the airstrikes in Syria.

== Background ==
Between the October 7 attacks by Hamas in southern Israel and 27 January 2024, Iran-backed groups launched missiles and rockets at US and coalition forces in the Middle East on 160 occasions. In these attacks, about 70 US and coalition soldiers sustained mostly minor injuries. The U.S. had retaliated for these incidents eight times.

About 3,000 US troops were stationed in Jordan at the time. The Tower 22 outpost, established as a Jordanian border outpost, had since 2015 been used by US troops in an "advise and assist" mission, initially training rebels fighting the regime of Syrian president Bashar al-Assad and later aiding Kurds fighting the Islamic State. Tower 22, which hosts American engineering, aviation, logistics and security personnel, lies 20 kilometers (12 miles) from the Al-Tanf garrison in Syria, where US and local forces collaborate in combating the Islamic State. As of 2020, Tower 22 had an operating AN/TPS-75 transportable 3D air search radar. At the time of the attack, there were about 350 personnel from the US Army and Air Force at Tower 22, including personnel from the Arizona National Guard's 158th Infantry Regiment, the California National Guard's 40th Infantry Division, the Kentucky National Guard's 138th Field Artillery Brigade, and the New York National Guard's 101st Expeditionary Signal Battalion.

== Drone attack ==
On 28 January 2024, an exploding drone struck the outpost's living quarters, killing three American service members who were asleep in tents at the time: Sgt. William Rivers, 46; Specialist Kennedy Sanders, 24; and Specialist Breonna Moffett, 23; all Georgia natives. They were subsequently identified as belonging to the 926th Engineer Brigade's 718th Engineer Company, a U.S. Army Reserve unit based at Fort Moore, Georgia.

At least 47 others were injured in the attack, who had to be medically evacuated to the Baghdad Diplomatic Support Center in Iraq. Of these eight, three were transported to Landstuhl Regional Medical Center in Germany for follow-up care. U.S. personnel were evaluated for possible traumatic brain injury. Most of the injured served in the US National Guard and belonged to units based in Arizona, California, Kentucky and New York. By 31 January, at least 27 service personnel were able to report back to duty.

== Responsibility ==
U.S. officials assessed that an Iranian-supported group had launched the attack. A US official indicated that a Shahed drone was used in the attack, and a spokesperson for the US Department of Defense said that the attack had the "footprints" of Kata'ib Hezbollah.

Later in the day, the Islamic Resistance in Iraq, an umbrella group of Iranian-backed factions, claimed that it had launched attacks on that day on an Israeli oil facility in the Mediterranean Sea as well as three US military bases in Syria, namely Shaddadi, Tanf and Rukban. However, the U.S. said the attack on Tower 22 was the only attack on its forces that it had tracked that day. Two other enemy drones, targeting sites in southeast Syria, were shot down. The US formally blamed the Islamic Resistance in Iraq for the attack on 31 January.

== US response ==
February 2024 United States airstrikes in Iraq and Syria
- Part of Attacks on US bases during the Gaza war and the Middle Eastern crisis (2023–present)
- Location: Iraq and Syria
- Target: Iranian Revolutionary Guards; Liwa al-Tafuf; Popular Mobilization Forces; Kata'ib Hezbollah; Islamic Resistance in Iraq; Liwa Fatemiyoun
- Date: 2–7 February 2024 (5 days)
- Executed by: United States: United States Air Force; United States Army; Specific units: United States Armed Forces; United States Air Force; Two B-1B Lancers (Bomber); A-10C Thunderbolt IIs (Attack aircraft); F-15E Strike Eagles (Fighter); United States Army; UH-60 Black Hawks (Helicopter)
- Outcome: US conducts 125 airstrikes targeting the Islamic Revolutionary Guard Corps and allied militias; More than 80 of the 85 targets were destroyed or rendered inoperable (US claim); Iran-backed groups halt attacks on US forces
- Casualties: 54–55 (Note: Syria: 35 on 2 February; Iraq: 16-17 on 2 February; 3 killed on 7 February) killed

The remains of the deceased soldiers were returned to the United States on 2 February and received with a transfer ceremony upon arrival at Dover Air Force Base in Delaware attended by president Joe Biden, first lady Jill Biden and Chairman of the Joint Chiefs of Staff Charles Q. Brown Jr., as well as the families of those killed. Tributes were paid at the victims' respective communities, while their funerals were held from 13 to 17 February. One of the soldiers was buried at the Georgia National Cemetery.

According to Omar Abu Layla, a Europe-based activist and the head of the Deir Ezzor 24 media outlet, Iran-backed fighters in eastern Syria began evacuating their posts in fear of retaliatory US strikes shortly after the attack took place.

=== US airstrikes ===
On 1 February, CBS reported that the White House had approved airstrikes on Iranian personnel and facilities in Syria and Iraq in retaliation for the attack. On 2 February, the US launched retaliatory airstrikes targeting Iranian-backed militias in Iraq and Syria. Around 85 targets linked to pro-Iranian forces were hit in seven different sites in Iraq and Syria.

B-1B bombers taking off prior to the strikes

Around midnight between 2 and 3 February local time (UTC+3), the United States Air Force carried out airstrikes targeting Iran-affiliated militia groups in Iraq and Syria. The operation involved two B-1B bombers deployed from Dyess Air Force Base, Texas. The targeted facilities included command and control operations centers, intelligence centers, rockets, missiles, unmanned aerial vehicle storage, as well as logistics and munition supply chain facilities belonging to militia groups. American officials reported that the strikes hit 85 targets across seven facilities, three in Iraq and four in Syria, using 125 precision-guided missiles. Of the 85 sites targeted, more than 80 were destroyed or rendered inoperable. The 15,000-mile round trip required 44 hours flying time from Texas.

Iraqi security officials reported that six airstrikes targeted a number of locations in Iraq, while Syrian state media announced that "American aggression" struck a number of sites in Syria's desert areas and the Iraq–Syria border. Iraqi officials reported that airstrikes targeted the headquarters of the Popular Mobilization Forces in Akashat, killing 16 fighters. Iraqi officials also said that three houses used by Kata'ib Hezbollah in Al Anbar Governorate were hit by airstrikes.

According to the Syrian Observatory for Human Rights, at least 35 Iran-backed militants were killed in the airstrikes in Syria.

=== 7 February ===
At 9:30 p.m. local time, the United States conducted a drone strike on a vehicle in Baghdad, resulting in the death of three Kata'ib Hezbollah militants, among them senior commander Abu Baqir al-Saadi. The attack was denounced by the Iraqi government, saying that the US-led military coalition in Iraq is becoming a "factor for instability".

=== 15 February ===
On 15 February, US officials announced that a cyberattack was conducted against an Iranian spy ship which was collecting intelligence on shipping in the Red Sea and Gulf of Aden. The officials said that the cyberattack, which occurred more than a week prior to the announcement, was in response to the drone attack and was meant to hinder the vessel's ability to communicate with the Houthis.

== Aftermath ==
On 17 June 2024, the U.S. Department of State designated Ansar Allah al-Awfiya (19th PMF Brigade) as a terrorist organization, following its involvement in the attack on Tower 22.

An Analog Devices employee was arrested in December 2024, and later charged with evading U.S. export controls and facilitating indirect sales of some of the technology used in the drone, via the Iranian military.

The United States Department of the Treasury imposed sanctions on several individuals affiliated with the Islamic Revolutionary Guard Corps.

Satellite imagery by Planet Labs revealed the extensive destruction of a facility utilized by the Liwa Fatemiyoun militia in the town of Ayyash, near Deir Ez-Zor in Syria. The facility was targeted and subsequently obliterated by B-1B bombers.

In Iraq, a funeral was held in Baghdad for 17 militiamen killed by the airstrikes on 4 February, with crowds chanting "America is the greatest devil" and holding pictures of the victims besides the ambulances transporting their remains.

On 4 February, U.S. president Joe Biden announced the intention to direct additional measures, including against the IRGC and IRGC-affiliated personnel and facilities, as appropriate, to address the series of attacks against United States forces and facilities.

== Reactions ==
=== United States ===
President Joe Biden wrote in a statement that their response to the drone attack in Jordan had begun and would "continue at times and places of our choosing." In the immediate aftermath of the attack U.S. President Joe Biden said the attack was "despicable" and vowed that the U.S. "will hold all those responsible to account at a time and in a manner of our choosing"; U.S. Secretary of Defense Lloyd Austin said: "we will take all necessary actions to defend the United States, our troops, and our interests." Jack Reed, the Democratic chairman of the Senate Armed Services Committee, said he was "confident the Biden Administration will respond in a deliberate and proportional manner." Republican senators John Cornyn, Tom Cotton and Lindsey Graham called on the White House to directly target Iran in response to the attacks. Former CIA director John Brennan described the attack as a "dangerous escalation" in the Middle East.

Secretary of Defense Lloyd Austin referred to the strikes as "the start of our response" and that Biden had "directed additional actions to hold the IRGC and affiliated militias accountable for their attacks on U.S. and Coalition Forces." The governor of Georgia, Brian Kemp, issued a statement mourning the "inexcusable loss of life" of the three soldiers, saying they "gave the last full measure of devotion in service to this country." Brigadier General Todd Lazaroski, commander of the US Army Reserve's 412th Engineer Command, said that "they represent the best of America." Flags were set at half-mast in Waycross, where one of the soldiers lived. Lieutenant General Jody Daniels, chief of the United States Army Reserve and commanding of the United States Army Reserve Command, also paid tribute to the soldiers and pledged to support "those left behind in the wake of this tragedy".

=== Syria ===
The Syrian Democratic Forces commander-in-chief, Mazloum Abdi, condemned the attack, affirming the group's stance against violence and "any attempt to disrupt peace in the region". The Syrian Ministry of Defence slammed the "aggression of the American occupation forces", which it said was attempting "to weaken the ability of the Syrian Arab Army and its allies in the field of fighting terrorism".

=== Iran ===
Iran denied involvement in the attack, but said "resistance groups in the region are responding [to] the war crimes and genocide of the child-killing Zionist regime." The Iranian Islamic Revolutionary Guards Corps warned that the country would respond to any US threat following plans by Washington to retaliate.

The Ministry of Foreign Affairs condemned the attacks, calling it a "strategic error by the US government which will have no result but to intensify ... instability in the region". Foreign ministry spokesperson Nasser Kanaani said the attacks were a "violation of the sovereignty and territorial integrity of Iraq and Syria, international law, and a clear violation of the United Nations Charter".

President Ebrahim Raisi said that Iran will not start a war, but it will "respond strongly" to anyone who bullies it.

Iran's ambassador to the United Nations claimed that Iran and its allied militias were comparable to that of NATO.

=== Iraq ===
Iraq condemned the attack, describing it as an "ongoing escalation" and said it was willing to collaborate on establishing rules to prevent "further repercussions" and escalation of the conflict in the region. The Iraqi government condemned the US attacks, calling it a "new aggression" against its sovereignty. Iraq summoned the U.S. charge d'affaires in Baghdad to deliver a formal protest.

The leader of the Iraqi Kata'ib Sayyid al-Shuhada militia group called on Kuwait, Jordan, and Saudi Arabia not to allow the United States to use their territory to launch attacks, saying that militias would target the source of the attacks.

The spokesperson for Harakat Hezbollah al-Nujaba, Hussein al-Mosawi, said that the US "must understand that every action elicits a reaction" and also saying that "We do not wish to escalate or widen regional tensions."

The Chairman of the Popular Mobilization Commission Falih Al-Fayyadh said that the US airstrikes went "too far" because they targeted a Popular Mobilization Forces facility, saying that attacking it was crossing the "red line" and that US strikes will not go "unnoticed."

=== Other countries ===
- The United Kingdom "absolutely condemned" the US attack. Prime Minister Rishi Sunak said he was concerned about tensions in the region and urged Iran to de-escalate. Foreign Secretary David Cameron also called on Iran to "de-escalate in the region."
- Hezbollah condemned the attacks, calling it a "blatant violation of the sovereignty of the two countries" and an "attack on their security and territorial integrity".
- Hamas condemned the airstrikes as pouring "oil on the fire". Senior Hamas official Sami Abu Zuhri told Reuters that the attack was a message to the US administration that "unless the killing of innocents in Gaza stops, it must confront the entire [Muslim] nation." and warned that the conflict could lead to a "regional explosion." Kata'ib Hezbollah said that it would suspend military operations against US forces "to prevent embarrassment to the Iraqi government".
- Palestinian Islamic Jihad condemned the attacks, calling the attacks "blatant American aggression" in the interest of “Western colonialism and the Zionist entity", the group also stated that it “salutes to the revolutionary Iraqi and Syrian peoples who, along with the Yemeni and Lebanese peoples, are paying the price for their support of our Palestinian people in resisting the war of genocide."
- The United Kingdom called the United States its "steadfast" ally and said that it supports the United States' right to respond to the attacks on its bases.
- Polish foreign minister Radosław Sikorski said the US airstrikes were the result of Iranian proxies "playing with fire".
- Russia condemned the attacks, The Russian foreign ministry said that the US was "sowing chaos and destruction” in the Middle East. Foreign Ministry spokesperson Maria Zakharova said that "It is obvious that the air strikes are deliberately designed to further inflame the conflict".
- China condemned the attacks. Beijing's ambassador Zhang Jun said that "The US military actions are undoubtedly stoking new turmoil in this region and further intensifying tensions" at the UN.
- Jordan condemned the attack and said it was cooperating with Washington to secure its borders. However, the Jordanian government spokesperson Muhannad Al Mubaidin insisted that the attack had happened outside of the kingdom across the border in Syria's al-Tanf base.
- Egypt's Foreign Ministry condemned the attack, expressed solidarity, and affirmed its stance against any terrorist acts that threaten the stability and security of Jordan. It also emphasized the necessity of confronting all forms of terrorism and rejecting violence to maintain security in the region.
- The attack was also condemned by Bahrain.
- Israeli Foreign Minister Israel Katz extended his condolences to the families of the soldiers killed in the attack and wished for a speedy recovery for the injured.
- Qatar warned that the response of the United States might risk compromising a temporary Gaza war ceasefire and hostage deal currently in progress.

== See also ==
- 2024 Erbil attack
- Jordan–United States relations
- List of wars involving the United States
- United States support for Israel in the Gaza war
- Rukban and Rukban refugee camp
- Jordanian–Syrian border incidents during the Syrian civil war
- Iranian intervention in Iraq (2014–present)
- Iran–United States relations during the Biden administration
