= Ya Ali Popular Formations =

Shia militia group in Iraq

Ya Ali Popular Formation
- Arabic: تشكيلات يا علي الشعبية
- Logo of the group
- Dates active: 2025 – present
- Country: Iraq
- Ideology: Anti-Syrian government
- Part of: Popular Mobilization Forces (alleged)

Ya Ali Popular Formations (Arabic: تشكيلات يا علي الشعبية) is a Shia militia group in Iraq. The group has been reported to engage in attacks against Syrians residing in Iraq, particularly those suspected of supporting Hay'at Tahrir al-Sham (HTS), a Sunni Islamist militant and political organization in Syria.

== History ==
Flag of the Ya Ali Popular Formations

A video surfaced showing the group attacking Syrian workers in Iraq. The footage depicted three masked militia members beating and threatening Syrians, accusing them of supporting HTS. One of the militia members was seen carrying a pistol.

The group has stated it will take action on perpetrators of violence against Syrian Alawites, citing government inaction as justification. The group also said that it will "pursue all Syrians who support Jolani and expel them from the country."

The group claimed that it "followed" the activities of Iraqi Syrians on social media who "praised" the rule of Syria's president Ahmed Al-Shara and the Syrian security forces operations against Assad loyalists.

Iraqi Prime Minister Mohammed Shia' Al Sudani condemned the group's attack, and called it a “shameful acts of violence against a number of Syrian brothers working in Iraq.” He has ordered the formation of a security team to track down people responsible for “committing disgraceful acts of violence” against them." Iraqi security forces have also arrested at least 13 people for "promoting terrorist groups" and "supporting" mass killings of Syrian Alawities.

Accounts on social media have claimed that the group is affiliated with the Popular Mobilization Forces.

In a video clip featuring the image of the former leader of the Lebanese Hezbollah group Sayyed Hassan Nasrallah, Abbas Shield Martyrdom Forces, Ya Ali Popular Formations and the Kataib Sarkhat al-Quds have threatened to take action in Syria and against the United States.
