= Mushtaq Talib Al-Saeedi =

Iraqi militant commander (1980–2024)

- Born: 1980; Baghdad, Iraq
- Died: 4 January 2024 (aged 43); Baghdad, Iraq
- Cause of death: Drone strike
- Military career
- Allegiance: Sadrist Movement (until 2011); Asa'ib Ahl al-Haq; Harakat Hezbollah al-Nujaba
- Service years: ?–2024
- Rank: Commander
- Nickname: Abu Taqwa
- Conflicts: War in Iraq (2013–2017); Operation Inherent Resolve; Attacks on US bases during the Gaza war

Mushtaq Talib Al-Saeedi (Arabic: مشتاق طالب السعيدي; 1980 – 4 January 2024), also known as Abu Taqwa, was an Iraqi militant of Harakat Hezbollah al-Nujaba. He was also a senior commander of the 12th brigade of the Popular Mobilization Forces.

== Biography ==
Born in Baghdad in 1980, Al-Saeedi grew up in the neighborhood of Al-Kamaliyah in a poor family from the Diyala Governorate. He was a member of the Sadrist Movement until his arrest by the Multi-National Force in 2011 and joined Asa'ib Ahl al-Haq and Harakat Hezbollah al-Nujaba upon his release. During the Second War in Iraq, he was a commander in Al Tarmia in the northern suburbs of Baghdad. He then reached an important apparatus with the Iran-backed Popular Mobilization Forces in the Baghdad Belts region. He was responsible for Hezbollah al-Nujaba's attacks against American military bases in Iraq and Syria.

Mushtaq Talib Al-Saeedi was assassinated in a targeted U.S. drone strike in Baghdad on 4 January 2024, at the age of 43.
