= True Promise Corps =

Militant organization in Iraq and Syria

- فيلق الوعد الصادق
- Founding leader: Sheikh Abu 'Ammar al-Iraqi
- Leaders: Sheikh Muhammad Hamza al-Tamimi; Abu Ali al-Najafi (Syrian branch)
- Spokesperson: Sheikh Ammar al-Lami
- Dates active: 2006 — present
- Country: Iraq
- Allegiance: Axis of Resistance; Popular Mobilization Units; Islamic Resistance in Iraq (denied)
- Active regions: Iraq; Ba'athist Syria
- Ideology: Shiism; Khomeinism
- Size: 2,000 combatants
- Wars: Iraqi conflict; Iraq War; War in Iraq (2013–2017); Salahuddin campaign; Battle of Mosul (2016–2017); Syrian civil war; Battle of Aleppo (2012–2016); Rif Dimashq Governorate campaign; Iran–Israel conflict; Attacks on US bases during the Gaza war; 2024 Iran–Israel conflict; 2026 Iran war
- Website: Official Twitter account Official YouTube channel

The True Promise Corps (Arabic: فيلق الوعد الصادق, romanized: Faylaq al-Wa'ad al-Sadiq) is a militant organization in Syria and Iraq.

== History ==
=== Foundation ===
The True Promise Corps were founded after the 2006 Lebanon War, by Abu 'Ammar al-Iraqi against the coalition that invaded Iraq.

=== Activities ===
In 2013, the group sent fighters to Syria during the Syrian civil war, to "defend Shiite holy sites", they participated in the battle of Aleppo after defending the Air Force Intelligence headquarters in Aleppo, the Syrian branch has its headquarters in the rural area of Damascus.

In 2014, after the Islamic State invasion of Iraq, the group fight against Daesh in Saladin Governorate and Tikrit during the Salahuddin campaign, and Fallujah and the Battle of Mosul.

The group congratulated the Islamic Resistance in Iraq on April 2024 attacks on Israel, and launched rockets themselves.

During the 2026 Iran war, the group declared its alignment with the Axis of Resistance.

=== Leadership ===
The group's leader is Sheikh Muhammad al-Tamimi, the same secretary general of "Harakat al-Mustaḍa'fin al-Islamiya," the group that professes affinity with the Ayatollah Ali Khamenei, the group spokesperson is Sheikh Ammar al-Lami.

The Syrian branch of the organization is led by Abu Ali al-Najafi, who has 2,000 fighters in Syria.

Muhammad Hamza al-Tamimi declared during the attacks on US bases during the Gaza war, that "the resistance is always the defender and the one that sacrifices itself for the stability of Iraq".

According to Muhammad Hamza al-Tamimi, the group is part of the Islamic Resistance in Iraq, however, True Promise Corps participation in the Islamic Resistance in Iraq has not been publicly declared.
