= Harakat Ansar Allah al-Awfiya =

Iraqi based militant organization

- حركة أنصار الله الأوفياء
- Leader: Haydar Muzhir Ma’lak al-Sa’idi
- Dates active: 2013–present
- Allegiance: Popular Mobilization Forces, Islamic Resistance in Iraq
- Ideology: Shia Islamism; Qutbism–Khomeinism; Anti-Zionism
- Status: Active
- Part of: Axis of Resistance
- Wars: Iraqi conflict; War in Iraq (2013–2017); Islamic State insurgency in Iraq (2017–present); 2019–2021 Iraqi protests; Middle Eastern crisis (2023–present); Attacks on U.S. bases in Iraq, Jordan, and Syria during the Gaza war; Tower 22 drone attack; Syrian civil war

Harakat Ansar Allah al-Awfiya (Arabic: حركة أنصار الله الأوفياء, lit. 'Loyal Supporters of Allah Movement') or just simply Ansar Allah al-Awfiya (Arabic: أنصار الله الأوفياء, lit. 'Loyal supporters of Allah'), sometimes called IMCR, or Ashab Al Yamin, is an Iraqi-based and Iranian funded Shia militant group that is a part of the Islamic Resistance in Iraq that was designated as terrorists by the United States Department of State on June 17, 2024, for attacking U.S. soldiers stationed in Jordan and Syria and its association and alliance with many already designated militant groups based in Iraq.

== History ==
The group was created in 2013 as a political group in Maysan Governorate calling themselves Kayan al-Sadiq wa al-Ataa before becoming a brigade of the Iraqi-state sponsored Popular Mobilization Forces under the name of the 19th PMF Brigade in 2014. The group still remain active politically, separate from its militant actions, under the named Harakat al-Sadiq wa al-Ataa. The group targeted many bases and soldiers of the U.S. military and the Syrian Democratic Forces. The group has also attacked The Global Coalition in order to attack Islamic State forces in both Syria and Iraq. The group has also been described as an ally of the Quds Force of the Iranian Revolutionary Guard Corps by doing attacks on their behalf.

The group allegedly had links to many kidnappings and murders of protesters during the 2019 Tishreen movement including the kidnapping of prominent leaders like Sajad al-Iraqi and Ali Jasb. The group has publicly threatened to terrorize Iraqi civilians who support the United States as a way to undermine what it calls "American interests in Iraq". The United States has claimed that the group had involvement in the Tower 22 drone attack against a U.S. base in Jordan in which 3 U.S. soldiers were killed and 34 were injured.

On June 17, 2024, the United States Department of State designated the group as a terrorist organization and the leader of the group, Haydar Muzhir Ma'lak al-Sa'idi, as a specially designated terrorist for their targeting of U.S. bases in the Middle East and the involvement of strikes against Israel during the Gaza war with many of the strikes coming from south Baghdad. On 18 September 2025, the U.S. Department of State also designated Harakat Ansar Allah al-Awfiya and its aliases as a Foreign Terrorist Organization under section 219 of the Immigration and Nationality Act. In response to the terrorist designation, the leader of the group mocked the United States by stating that the designation was a "badge of honor". On April 27, 2026, Rewards for Justice announced a $10 million reward for information on al-Sa'idi, also known as Haydar al-Gharawi.
