= Rukban refugee camp =

Rukban refugee camp مخيم الركبان للاجئين
- Area
- Location within Syria
- Coordinates: 33°18′39.1″N 38°40′06.5″E
- Country: Syria

Population
  - Estimate (2019): 11,000

The Rukban refugee camp (Arabic: مخيم الرُّكبان للاجئين) was one of the biggest refugee camps for displaced civilians during the Syrian Civil War. It lies in southern Syria adjacent to the Jordan–Syria border, and close to the tripoint with Iraq. It is named after the nearby Rukban area, an arid remote region in northeastern Jordan.

The camp was established when refugees piled up on the Syrian side of the borders with Jordan in 2014, as it became one of the crossing points for Syrian refugees fleeing the Syrian Civil War. While Jordan welcomed hundreds of thousands of refugees from Syria, the country specifically blocked the refugees at Rukban from entering, citing security concerns regarding the presence of hidden ISIS sleeper cells.

In 2016, a car passing from the refugee camp in Syria managed to reach a Jordanian army outpost designated for the distribution of humanitarian aid to Syrian refugees. The car exploded, killing 6 and injuring 14 Jordanian soldiers. Jordan thereafter declared its eastern and northern border closed military zones. The camp in Syria witnessed further incidents, including two car bomb attacks that killed tens of refugees in 2016 and 2017.

The population of the camp in Syria peaked at 45,000 in 2018. It suffered poor living conditions until its population later dwindled to 11,000 in 2019.

Following the 2024 Syrian opposition offensives and the fall of the Assad regime, the blockade was ended and refugees began returning to other parts of Syria. In 2025, after all families moved out of the area, the Syrian Transitional Government announced the camp's closure.

== Background ==
Rukban is an arid remote area in northeastern Jordan near the borders with Syria. Since 2014, it became one of the crossing points for Syrian refugees going to Jordan. However, Jordan soon after blocked their access, citing security concerns regarding the presence of hidden Islamic State of Iraq and the Levant sleeper cells, as many of the refugees arrived mostly from then Islamic State-controlled territories such as Raqqa. Jordan only allowed around 50 to a 100 of them to pass into the country after strict screening. Therefore, refugees piled up on the border, creating the Rukban refugee camp in Syria.

In 2015, the UN agreed with Jordan that the number of refugees that it is hosting gives rise to legitimate security concerns, however, it did not concede that Rukban residents presented any specific or additional security concern, and called on Jordan to immediately allow refugees in Rukban to access the country. Melessa Flemming of UNHCR said: "UN officials accept Jordan has legitimate security concerns, but the UN continues to urge Jordan to permit residents of Rukban to enter Jordan." The number of Syrians there rose to 75,000 in 2016, becoming a de facto camp in Syrian territory, which drew heavy criticism and condemnation of Jordan from Human Rights Watch in 2015.

== Syrian Civil War spillover ==
=== 21 June 2016 car bomb ===
At dawn on 21 June 2016, a car crossed over from Rukban on Syrian territory and managed to reach a Jordanian army outpost designated for the distribution of humanitarian aid to Syrian refugees. The car exploded, killing 6 and injuring 14 Jordanian soldiers.

Jordanian minister of foreign affairs Nasser Judeh said in a press conference about the incident that "we don't need a hideous terrorist attack like this one to prove to the world the legitimacy of our security concerns". He added that Jordan "will not put the lives of our soldiers and our country at risk because this is not Jordan's problem alone, this is an international responsibility" and that it "has provided for refugees what no other country has, with regard to its resources. We will not allow anyone to take the higher moral ground". Jordan afterwards declared its northern and eastern borders closed military areas, and stressed that the armed forces' border guards will not tolerate any uncoordinated movements approaching its borders and that force will be decisively used against it.

Despite this, HRW continued to condemn Jordan, most recently on 7 September 2016, due to deteriorating life conditions in Rukban after humanitarian aid was halted due to fears from further terror attacks against the Jordanian army and international humanitarian aid agencies.

=== 17 December 2016 car bomb ===
Another attack happened on 17 December 2016, 3 km north of the border in the refugee camp which lies in Syria. The bombing targeted a warehouse while it was distributing clothes to refugees, resulting in 2 dead and 15 injured Syrians. On 21 January 2017, according to the Syrian Observatory for Human Rights, a third explosion went off in the camp by a car bomb, in which 4 Syrians were killed and 14 were injured. The injured were evacuated by the Jordanian army into a medical facility.

=== 3 May 2017 car bomb ===
A Jordanian military source said a car bomb exploded in the market area of the camp on 3 May 2017, killing four Syrians and injuring others. Jordan began blocking aid deliveries to the camp from early 2018.

=== Later developments ===
On 23 August 2018, Russian spokeswoman Maria Zakharova claimed that hundreds of ISIL and Jabhat al-Nusra members were hiding among the refugees inside the camp, using them as human shields, with the knowledge of the U.S. military at the nearby Al-Tanf air base in Syria. In September 2016 Alice Wells, the then-U.S. Ambassador to Jordan, made the claim that the refugee camp housed a variety of different people possibly including armed groups and terrorists. However, the prevalence of IS fighters in the camp is disputed by the camp's civilian Shura governing council.

In October 2018, UNICEF estimated that 45,000 people live at the camp. Other estimates are of 50,000 or even 70,000. In October, relief workers and refugees said the Syrian army blockaded the roads and prevented aid from reaching the camp, in an attempt to force frightened refugees into reconciliation. Western sources say it was part of a Russian backed effort to pressure US and rebel forces to leave their base at nearby al-Tanf, while a Russian military source blamed the United States as responsible for security in the area. UNICEF reported that two infants died in the camp in early October, and called for urgent action, and one local NGO reported 14 civilians had died from late September to 10 October.

In January 2019, eight children were reported to have died at the Rukban camp due to cold weather and inadequate medical care, with the total number of refugees at the camp estimated at 45,000, 80% women and children. Rukban received its first aid delivery in three months on 7 February 2019 with the United Nations and the Syrian Arab Red Crescent reaching the camp with 118 trucks packed with food supplies, basic medicines, education items and children's recreational kits. Aid workers had arrived on the night of 6 February after arduous negotiations with the Syrian government. The aid convoy was expected to spend a week distributing material to the camp's residents.

In April 2019, UNOCHA estimated that 36,000 people were still living in the camp, and that 7,000 had left "in the last month or so." As of 23 May, 13,153 people in 16 groups have left Rukban and been transported to five shelters in Homs governorate; constituting more than a third of Rukban's population of nearly 42,000.

In July 2019 one estimate suggested the camp had dwindled to a population of 11,000. Aid workers, diplomats and residents say it was a result of a five-month Russian siege to block supplies.

As of March 2020 the area suffered in a food crisis and humanitarian disaster. The Syrian government continued to block almost all aid, with no more than four aid convoys over the prior two years. Residents stated they feared violence or forcible military conscription by the Syrian regime should they attempt to leave.

=== Fall of Assad and aftermath ===
In November 2024, Syrian opposition groups launched a series of offensives on various regime-held cities, capturing Aleppo, Hama, and many other towns. The news was met with widespread celebrations in the refugee camp, as residents hoped the offensive would finally allow them to return home. The Revolutionary Commando Army, a small rebel group headquartered in the Al-Tanf military base located next to the camp, eventually joined the offensives and moved towards Palmyra and Damascus. Following the fall of Damascus and disintegration of the Assad government, the regime-imposed blockade was lifted, and thousands of people living in the camp began returning to their homes in the rest of Syria.

While the lifting of the Assad-imposed siege has made movement far easier than before, returning to other parts of the country has nonetheless been slow for the refugees in the camp. This is mainly due to a lack of money for transportation over the long, treacherous desert landscape and, in most cases, due to the refugees' homes having been destroyed during the years-long civil war. According to the head of a local council in the camp, Bassam Abdullah Suleiman, approximately 3,000 people left the camp in the immediate aftermath of the fall of Assad, while 5,000 continue to live there, either waiting for transportation, for new housing opportunities, or for their original houses to be repaired.

==== Closure ====
On 7 June 2025, the new government of Syria announced that the refugee camp is officially closed and empty and that the residents of the camp relocated to other parts of Syria.

== See also ==
- Syrian refugee camps
- Jordan-Syria border
- Rukban
- Al-Tanf
