= Exploding drone =

Exploding drone may refer to:

- Loitering munition
- One-way attack drone
