= Ali Khedery =

American diplomat

- Education: Massachusetts Institute of Technology
- Occupations: Entrepreneur; Fellow at Massachusetts Institute of Technology
- Known for: Former Chief executive at Dragoman Ventures; Former Advisor for ExxonMobil in the Middle East

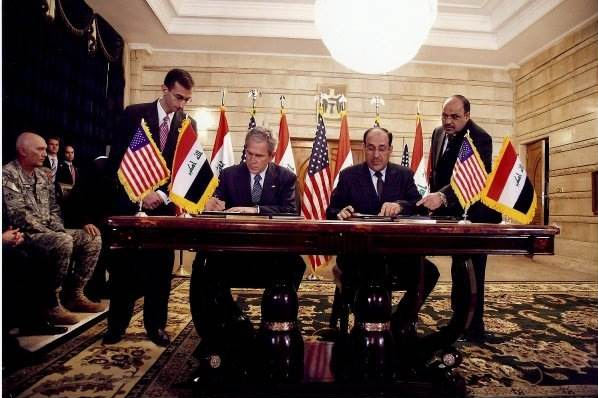
Ali Khedery standing behind U.S. President George W. Bush, with Iraqi Prime Minister Nouri al-Maliki

Ali Khedery is an American businessman and a fellow at the Massachusetts Institute of Technology. Before working as an executive at ExxonMobil and the Abu Dhabi National Oil Company, he was the longest continuously serving American official in Iraq, from 2003 to 2009, and was a special assistant to five U.S. ambassadors and as a senior adviser to three heads of U.S. Central Command.

== Biography ==
Before joining the Massachusetts Institute of Technology, Khedery was chief executive of the U.S.-based Dragoman Ventures, an international strategic advisory firm.

Prior to that, Khedery was an executive with ExxonMobil Corporation, where he was senior adviser for the Middle East. During his tenure, Khedery engaged with heads of state, ministers, and opinion-makers and advised ExxonMobil's senior executives on strategic pursuits and the region’s unprecedented political, economic, security, and social developments during the "Arab Spring." Khedery played a leading role in drafting and implementing the corporation’s Iraq country strategy; its Iraqi federal- and Kurdistan regional government engagement strategies; and he was the architect and chief political negotiator of ExxonMobil's historic billion-dollar entry into the Kurdistan Region. He was promoted as director of public and government affairs for ExxonMobil Kurdistan Region of Iraq Limited.

Khedery also worked for the U.S. State and Defense departments, where he was special assistant to five American ambassadors in Iraq, and as senior adviser to three four-star chiefs of U.S. Central Command, the military authority responsible for operations across the broader Middle East and Central Asia. Numerous special assignments included participation in sensitive negotiations pertaining to the formation of five Iraqi governments; the drafting of the Iraqi Constitution and the oil and gas and revenue sharing laws; insurgent outreach which culminated in the tribal "Awakening"; the trilateral U.S.–Iran–Iraq talks; negotiating the U.S.–Iraq bilateral Strategic Framework and Security (SOFA) agreements; travel across four continents with all of Iraq's presidents and prime ministers; and Iran war- and regional contingency planning in Egypt, Saudi Arabia, Yemen, Oman, Bahrain, Qatar, Kuwait, Syria, Lebanon, and the United Arab Emirates. Khedery was the longest continuously-serving American official in Iraq; a member of the U.S. government's Senior Executive Service; and a recipient of the Secretary of Defense's Medal for Exceptional Public Service, the Secretary of State's Tribute, and the Joint Civilian Service Achievement Medal for his contributions to American and allied national security interests.

Khedery was branded "one of the best connected men in Iraq" in a Pulitzer finalist Reuters special report chronicling Exxon's pivot from Basra to Kurdistan. He has appeared on CNN's Amanpour, BBC's Hardtalk, PBS' Frontline, al-Arabiya, al-Jazeera, France24, Sky News, Vice News, RT, NPR, and he played a leading role in the production of ABC News' investigative report uncovering Iraqi war crimes following the fall of Mosul and the reconstitution of the Iran-backed militias. The author of front-page opinion features in the Washington Post and the New York Times, he has also written for Foreign Affairs, Politico, Foreign Policy, and the Guardian.

As Fellow at the Massachusetts Institute of Technology, and under the tutelage of MIT President Emerita Susan Hockfield, Khedery pioneered the theory of Convergence 3.0. Building on Hockfield's thesis that Convergence 1.0 fused physics and engineering to yield semiconductors and radar technology and Convergence 2.0 fused biology and engineering to yield gene editing technology, Khedery postulated that the 21st century will be defined by Convergence 3.0 which fuses data, technology, science, and the humanities to yield the Age of Artificial Intelligence.

An Aspen Institute Middle East Leadership Initiative fellow, Khedery also worked for the Bill & Melinda Gates Foundation and the Office of the Governor of Texas, where he helped found and administer the Governor's Council on Science and Biotechnology Development. He received a bachelor's degree from the University of Texas at Austin and a master's degree from the Massachusetts Institute of Technology.

== Literary references ==
In his book Squandered Victory, author Larry Diamond referred to Khedery as "an Iraqi American liaison to the Governing Council, who looked as though he was sixteen but operated as if he had been through a dozen of the hardest-fought political campaigns."

In her book Tell Me How This Ends, author Linda Robinson highlights that Khedery "was the only American official who had been in Baghdad, in the inner circle, for the entire five years of the war. The gifted young man had worked for every iteration of the American mission, for Jay Garner, Paul Bremer, and ambassadors John Negroponte, Zalmay Khalilzad, and Ryan Crocker. Khedery, who spoke fluent Arabic, traveled with Prime Minister Nouri al-Maliki and knew all the other Iraqi politicians. At Bremer's request, he had worked with Samir Sumaidaie when he was interior minister, before Bayan Jabr took over and allowed the Badr militia to set up secret prisons in the Jadriya compound. Hundreds of brutally tortured prisoners had been found there in late 2005. Khedery knew that many human rights travesties had occurred under the new regime. He knew where the metaphorical bodies were buried and many of the actual ones. Many Iraqis called him to find where their family members had been detained. Throughout the years, had used his contacts and knowledge of the players to ferret out the information and get many Iraqis released. But some trails had gone cold. One Iraqi mother called him regularly. Her son had been taken in 2005 by the Wolf Brigade, the notorious National Police brigade originally known as the Special Commandos. She believed he had been taken to the Jadriya prison. Khedery moved heaven and earth to try to find him. In the summer of 2007, she called him at his desk outside Crocker's office. Her pitiful voice rent him. He was deeply pained that he had not been able to find her son. He hated to admit it, but he knew that the young man was very likely dead. Thin and tired, Khedery finally decided it was time to go back to the United States. He left Iraq in the spring of 2009."

Khedery assisted in editing and publishing Stefanie Sanford's Civic Life in the Information Age.
