= Rukban =

Rukban الركبان
- Area
- Location within Jordan
- Coordinates: 33°18′51.1″N 38°42′10.1″E

Rukban (Arabic: الرُّكبان, romanized: Al-Rukban) is an arid remote area in northeast Jordan adjacent to the Jordan–Syria border, and close to the tripoint with Iraq.

The area became in 2014 one of the crossing points for Syrian refugees fleeing the Syrian Civil War. While Jordan welcomed hundreds of thousands of refugees from Syria, the country specifically blocked the refugees at Rukban from entering, citing security concerns regarding the presence of hidden ISIS sleeper cells. This led to thousands of refugees piling up on the Syrian side of the border, creating the Rukban refugee camp.

In 2016, a car passing from the refugee camp in Syria managed to reach a Jordanian army outpost, exploding and killing 6 and injuring 14 Jordanian soldiers. Jordan thereafter declared its eastern and northern border closed military zones. The camp in Syria witnessed further incidents, including two car bomb attacks that killed tens of refugees in 2016 and 2017.

In 2024, a small US army outpost based in Rukban, known as Tower 22, was targeted by a drone attack launched by the Islamic Resistance in Iraq, which killed 3 American soldiers and injured at least 34 others.

== Background ==
Rukban is an arid remote area in northeast Jordan adjacent to the Jordan–Syria border, and close to the tripoint with Iraq. The area became in 2014 one of the crossing points for Syrian refugees fleeing the Syrian Civil War. While Jordan welcomed hundreds of thousands of refugees from Syria, the country specifically blocked the refugees at Rukban from entering, citing security concerns regarding the presence of hidden ISIS sleeper cells. This led to thousands of refugees piling up on the Syrian side of the border, creating the Rukban refugee camp, which led to criticism of Jordan by international human rights organizations in 2015.

In 2015, the UN agreed with Jordan that the number of refugees that it is hosting gives rise to legitimate security concerns, however, it did not concede that Rukban residents presented any specific or additional security concern, and called on Jordan to immediately allow refugees in Rukban to access the country. Melessa Flemming of UNHCR said: "UN officials accept Jordan has legitimate security concerns, but the UN continues to urge Jordan to permit residents of Rukban to enter Jordan." The number of Syrians there rose to 75,000 in 2016, becoming a de facto camp in Syrian territory, which drew heavy criticism and condemnation of Jordan from Human Rights Watch in 2015.

== Syrian Civil War spillover ==
=== 21 June 2016 car bomb ===
At dawn on 21 June 2016, a car crossed over from Rukban on Syrian territory and managed to reach a Jordanian army outpost designated for the distribution of humanitarian aid to Syrian refugees. The car exploded, killing 6 and injuring 14 Jordanian soldiers.

Jordanian minister of foreign affairs Nasser Judeh said in a press conference about the incident that "we don't need a hideous terrorist attack like this one to prove to the world the legitimacy of our security concerns". He added that Jordan "will not put the lives of our soldiers and our country at risk because this is not Jordan's problem alone, this is an international responsibility" and that it "has provided for refugees what no other country has, with regard to its resources. We will not allow anyone to take the higher moral ground". Jordan afterwards declared its northern and eastern borders closed military areas, and stressed that the armed forces' border guards will not tolerate any uncoordinated movements approaching its borders and that force will be decisively used against it.

=== 17 December 2016 car bomb ===
Another attack happened on 17 December 2016, 3 km north of the border in the refugee camp which lies in Syria, resulting in 2 dead and 15 injured Syrians. On 21 January 2017, according to the Syrian Observatory for Human Rights, a third explosion went off in the camp by a car bomb, in which 4 Syrians were killed and 14 were injured. The injured were evacuated by the Jordanian army into a medical facility.

=== 3 May 2017 car bomb ===
A Jordanian military source said a car bomb exploded in the market area of the camp in Syria on 3 May 2017, killing four Syrians and injuring others.

== Tower 22 drone attack ==
On 28 January 2024, a US army logistics support base in north-east Jordan was hit by a drone attack launched by the Islamic Resistance in Iraq, which killed 3 American soldiers and injured 34.

== See also ==
- Jordan–Syria border
- Rukban refugee camp
