= Attacks on US bases during the Middle Eastern crisis (2023–present) =

Armed conflict

- Part of the Iran–Israel proxy conflict, the Middle Eastern crisis (2023–present), the 2024 Syrian opposition offensives and the Eastern Syria insurgency in the Syrian civil war
- Map of Iran-backed strikes (red) and American counterstrikes (blue) in Iraq, Jordan, and Syria
Date	17 October 2023 – present
Location	Iraq, Jordan, and Syria
Status	Iraqi militias temporarily halt attacks on US forces until April 2024; The US withdraws from Hemo base in Northeastern Syria The SDF launches the Deir ez-Zor offensive in response to the ongoing attacks

Belligerents
Iran; Ba'athist Syria (until 2024); Proxies: Islamic Resistance in Iraq; Syrian Hezbollah; Liwa Fatemiyoun; Popular Mobilization Forces	United States; United Kingdom; Supported by: Jordan (Democratic Autonomous Administration of North and East Syria) Rojava (Syrian opposition) Al-Tanf Garrison

Commanders and leaders
(Iran) Aziz Nasirzadeh † (Iran) Mohammad-Reza Gharaei Ashtiani (Iran) Esmail Qaani (Syria) Ali Mahmoud Abbas; Falih Al-Fayyadh; Qais Khazali; Akram al-Kaabi; Mushtaq Talib al-Saidi †; Abu Baqir al-Saadi †	(United States) Lloyd Austin (United States) Charles Q. Brown Jr. (United States) Dan Caine (United States) Brad Cooper Mazloum Abdi (Syrian opposition) Muhammad Farid al-Qasim (Syrian opposition) Salem Turki al-Antri

Units involved
Islamic Revolutionary Guard Corps; Aerospace Force; Syrian Armed Forces; National Defence Forces; Kata'ib Hezbollah; Asa'ib Ahl al-Haq; Kata'ib Sayyid al-Shuhada; Harakat Hezbollah al-Nujaba; Ashab al-Kahf; Harakat Ansar Allah al-Awfiya; Al Thawriyyun group; Lions of Okaidat	United States Armed Forces; United States Army; United States Air Force; Syrian Democratic Forces; (Syrian opposition) Revolutionary Commando Army

Casualties and losses
113 killed (Note: Syria: Nine killed on 8 November; Eight killed on 12 November; Four killed on 29 November; Four killed on 7 December; Two killed on 23 January; Three killed on 25 January; 35 killed on 2 February; Iraq: Eight killed on 22 November; Five killed on 3 December; One killed on 26 December; Four killed on 4 January; Seven killed on 23 January; 16 killed on 2 February; 3 killed on 7 February; 4 killed on 30 July)	(United States) 6 killed, 145 wounded (Note: Three servicemembers. One contractor who died from cardiac arrest during a false alarm. Two soldiers were declared dead (non-combat)) (Note: 83 wounded by 28 January, 47 others wounded on 28 January, 7 others wounded on 5 August, 8 others wounded on 9 August); One MQ-9 Reaper drone shot down; 7 killed, 18 wounded; (Syrian opposition) 1+ wounded
- One Iraqi security forces serviceman wounded

Starting on 17 October 2023, and in response to United States support for Israel in the Gaza war, Iran-backed militias initiated a coordinated series of more than 170 attacks on US military bases and assets in Syria, Iraq, and Jordan. These attacks resulted in injuries to dozens of US service members. In retaliation, the US has launched multiple counterattacks, resulting in the death of about 65 militants including a senior commander of the Nujaba Movement, Mushtaq Talib al-Saidi. In February 2024, following US airstrikes in Iraq and Syria, militia attacks against US forces were halted. Iraqi militias agreed with the Iraqi government in December 2024 to fully cease their attacks following the fall of the Assad regime in Syria.

== Attacks ==
=== Iraq ===
==== Al-Asad air base ====
On 17 October 2023, amid the Gaza war, Iraqi militants launched a drone strike on al-Asad Airbase, a United States base in northern Iraq. The airstrike was intercepted. The next day, a false alarm in the airbase caused the death of a civilian contractor from cardiac arrest. On 20 October, the US ordered all non-emergency staff to leave their embassy in Baghdad and consulate in Erbil.

On 20 November, eight US and coalition soldiers were injured from a ballistic missile attack, and there was minor infrastructural damage after the air base was attacked by a ballistic missile.

On 20 January 2024, the Islamic Resistance in Iraq claimed responsibility for striking the base with dozens of missiles which injured several US military personnel and an Iraqi service member. At 6:30 p.m. Baghdad time, the IRI launched multiple ballistic missiles and other rockets at the Al-Asad Airbase. The United States military attempted to defend the base with Patriot missiles. More than 15 MIM-104 Patriot missiles were launched to defend the base.

On August 5, 2024, a missile attack targeted the Al-Asad airbase in western Iraq, resulting in injuries to at least five US servicemembers and two contractors. The attack involved the firing of two Katyusha rockets, which landed inside the base. One of the injured servicemembers sustained serious injuries. The incident is seen as a potential escalation in the ongoing tensions between Iran and the United States.

==== Al-Harir air base ====
On 8 November 2023, an armed drone targeted al-Harir air base hosting US forces in northern Iraq. On 25 December 2023, the Islamic Resistance in Iraq claimed responsibility for a drone attack on the base which injured three US soldiers, one being critical.

==== Other attacks in Iraq ====
On 9 November, US forces were struck three separate times in 24 hours, including drone strikes in Al-Asad Airbase and Al-Harir Air Base, as well as an IED attack on a patrol near the Mosul Dam.

On 18 January 2024, the Islamic Resistance of Iraq shot down a US MQ-9 Reaper drone after it took off from Kuwait near Muqdadiyah, Diyala Governorate.

On 10 September, two rockets exploded in the vicinity of American personnel stationed in Camp Victory, near Baghdad International Airport. No casualties were reported. Jaafar al-Husseini, the spokesperson of Kata'ib Hezbollah, said that the attack aimed to disrupt Iranian president Masoud Pezeshkian's visit to Baghdad, which was scheduled the following day.

==== 2026 Iran war ====
On 14 March 2026, the Kataib Hezbollah faction launched a drone that breached the air defenses of the Camp Victory base and managed to strike it. On 17 March 2026, the Saraya Awliya al-Dam faction published a footage of a reconnaissance drone flying above the US embassy compound in baghdad. According to an observer the footage is consistent with the footage obtained from a Fiber optic drone suggesting that the group had acquired such advanced technology. On the 21st March 2026 the Ashab al-Kahf faction set the Camp Victory base ablaze. On 25 March 2026 an AN/MPQ-64 Sentinel along with a Black Hawk was struck at the Victory Base Complex in bahgdad by an IRI fibre optic drone.

=== Syria ===
==== Al-Tanf garrison ====
On 18 October 2023, a drone strike by an Iranian proxy on the al-Tanf garrison resulted in over 20 injuries. On 1 November, a minor drone strike was reported at the al-Tanf garrison.

==== Al-Omar field ====
On 4 February 2024, a drone struck a training ground in Al-Omar field in Deir ez-Zor, eastern Syria, which houses US troops, according to the Syrian Democratic Forces. Though no casualties were reported among US forces, at least seven Kurdish fighters were killed and 18 injured. The Islamic Resistance in Iraq claimed responsibility for the attack. The SDF condemned the attack, and said it had "every right to respond".

==== Other attacks in Syria ====
On 24 October 2023, the Islamic Resistance of Iraq claimed responsibility for multiple drone strikes on US bases in eastern Syria, notably al-Omar oil field in Deir ez-Zor Governorate and al-Shaddadi in the Al-Hasakah Governorate.

On 10 January 2024, the Islamic Resistance of Iraq claimed responsibility for an attack on Hemo base in north of Hasakah province. As a result of this attack, the US withdrew from the base, evacuating 350 US soldiers and relocating them to Tal Baidar base. Tal Baidar base was previously targeted by the Islamic Resistance in Iraq in November 2023.

On 21 April 2024, five rockets were fired from Zummar, Iraq towards the Kharab al-Jir base in Syria which houses US and coalition soldiers in the first major attack since early February. No US personnel were injured. The Syrian Observatory of Human Rights blamed the attack on the Islamic Resistance in Iraq. Iraqi authorities launched a search in Nineveh province, locating and burning the vehicle used in the attack.

On 9 August 2024, a kamikaze drone struck the US military base Rumalyn Landing Zone in eastern Syria, injuring eight US soldiers.

On 13 August 2024, six rockets targeting an US airbase in Deir ez-Zor Governorate fell near the facility. As a response to the strike, US-led coalition launched artillery strikes.

=== Jordan ===
==== Tower 22 outpost ====
On 28 January 2024, a one-way drone attack took place at a US outpost in Jordan, resulting in the deaths of three US soldiers and injuries to 47 others.

=== Qatar ===
==== Al-Udeid Air Base ====
On 23 June 2025, the Islamic Revolutionary Guards Corps launched a missile attack on al-Udeid Air Base, a forward headquarters of US Central Command near Doha, Qatar, as a response to the US bombing several nuclear sites in Iran days prior. Initial reports described fourteen ballistic missiles being launched at the base, which was by then evacuated, with thirteen of them having been intercepted before they struck their target. No casualties occurred in the attack, and there was no significant damage, though the Department of Defense later acknowledged that a geodesic dome containing communications equipment had been hit.

== US response ==
US retaliatory airstrike in north Abu Kamal, Syria, 12 November 2023. According to the US, the target was an IRGC training facility.

On 27 October 2023, the United States military responded to the airstrikes by bombing weapons and ammunition storage facilities in Abu Kamal, Syria with F-16 fighter jets. They further stated that a total of 16 military airstrikes were conducted by Iran-backed groups; 12 in Iraq and four in Syria.

On 8 November, the US Department of Defense announced that they had carried out attacks against the IRGC and IRGC-linked targets in Deir ez-Zor. According to the Syrian Observatory for Human Rights, 9 workers in the facilities were killed in the strikes.

On 12 November, the United States Department of Defense and Central command announced additional US airstrikes targeting IRGC affiliated groups in response to continued airstrikes against US forces in the region. The attacks targeted a safe house and training area used by militias in Mayadin and Abu Kamal and resulted in the killing of 8 militiamen.

On 21 November, a USAF AC-130 gunship retaliated against a Kata'ib Hezbollah vehicle near Abu Gharib, in response to the Islamic Resistance In Iraq's 20 November missile attack on US forces at Ain al Assad Airbase. According to US assessments, several Iran-backed fighters were killed in the strike. The following day, US fighters jets conducted airstrikes on Iraqi Kata'ib Hezbollah facilities, killing over eight fighters.

On 4 December, a US airstrike near Kirkuk killed five Iraqi militants as they attempted to fire explosive projectiles at US forces. They were identified as members of an Iran-backed militia. The Islamic Resistance in Iraq claimed that the five people killed were its members, and vowed retaliation against the US

On 26 December, the US conducted an airstrike on a PMU base in Hillah which killed one soldier and injured 20 others, with at least 12 being members of the Ministry of Interior.

On 4 January 2024, the United States carried out a drone strike on the headquarters of Harakat Al-Nujaba in Baghdad, with the specific target being Mushtaq Talib al-Saidi, a senior leader of Harakat al Nujaba held responsible for orchestrating attacks against US forces. The strike resulted in the death of four individuals, including al-Saidi, and left six others wounded. According to Iraqi militia sources and police reports, the attack involved two rockets fired from a drone, which struck a vehicle within the headquarters.

On 23 January 2024, the United States launched a series of airstrikes on three facilities used by Iran-backed militias in Iraq. The United States defence secretary, Lloyd Austin, announced the strikes in a statement the same day. The strikes targeted several militia groups with connections to Iran, including Kataib Hezbollah. The Iraqi government later accused the United States of escalating existing regional tensions. Lloyd Austin defended the attacks. Kataib Hezbollah announced the suspension of operations against the US on 30 January.

Kataib Hezbollah also distanced its activities from Iran claiming "our brothers in the axis – especially in the Islamic Republic – do not know how we work jihad".

=== February 2024 airstrikes ===
On 2 February, the US launched retaliatory airstrikes targeting Iran-backed militias in Iraq and Syria, in response to an attack that killed three US troops in Jordan. According to the Syrian Observatory for Human Rights, at least 35 Iran-backed militiamen were killed in the strikes in Syria. At least 5 of the killed militiamen were buried a few days later in the Iranian city of Mashhad, with 4 of the killed being members of the Afghan Fatemiyoun Brigade. Iraqi Popular Mobilization Forces announced that 16 of their fighters were killed in the airstrikes.

On 7 February, a US drone strike on a vehicle in the Mashtal neighborhood of Baghdad reportedly killed a commander of Kata'ib Hezbollah. Another source reported that the attack targeted a vehicle used by the Popular Mobilization Forces and killed three people. US officials did not make a comment about the attack. According to Reuters, other pro-Iranian groups were also hit in the attack. Following the airstrikes, militia attacks against US forces were halted.

=== July 2024 airstrikes ===
On 30 July, the US carried out an airstrike near Babylon, Iraq, killing four members of Iraq's Popular Mobilization Units and a Houthi drone specialist and injuring four others. Iraq condemned the strike saying the US-led military coalition committed a "heinous crime" by targeting security sites and said the attacks were a serious violation of the coalition's mission and mandate.

== Iraqi government response ==
On 5 January 2024, Iraqi Prime Minister Mohammed Shia' Al Sudani announced that the Iraqi government would begin a process towards the removal of the US-led international military coalition following the American drone strike on Baghdad which assassinated Mushtaq Talib al-Saidi. After the 23 January 2024 US attacks in Iraq, the US and Iraqi government agreed to begin talks on the future of the US military presence in Iraq, including discussions on the feasibility of a complete US military withdrawal from Iraq.

On March 22, Iraqi Foreign Minister Fuad Hussein met with Jake Sullivan, the National Security Advisor to the US President, during his trip to the United States. On 23 March, it was announced that Iraqi PM al-Sudani will visit the White House in Washington DC on 15 April to hold formal talks about reducing the presence of the US-led military coalition in Iraq.

In September 2024, the Iraqi government and the US reached an understanding on plans for the withdrawal of US-led coalition forces from Iraq. Reports stated that the agreement would see hundreds of troops leave by September 2025, with the remainder departing by the end of 2026.

== Developments ==
On 30 January 2024, Kata'ib Hezbollah announced the suspension of all its military operations against US forces in the region after the Tower 22 drone attack which killed 3 US soldiers and injured 47 others. They announced this decision was taken out of preventing "embarrassment" of the Iraqi government which has called for all resistance parties to de-escalate the situation.

On 1 April 2024, Abu Ali al-Askari, security chief of Kata'ib Hezbollah based in Iraq, said the organisation was prepared to arm "Islamic Resistance" in Jordan and is ready to provide "12,000 fighters with light and medium weapons, anti-armor launchers, tactical missiles, millions of rounds of ammunition, and tons of explosives" to "defend the Palestinians and avenge the honour of Muslims." On the same day, al-Tanf garrison in Syria was attacked by a one-way attack drone which was intercepted.

On 19 June 2025, Kata'ib Hezbollah leader Abu Ali al-Askari vowed to attack U.S. bases if the United States entered the Twelve-Day War in support of Israel, stating "should the United States enter into this war, the deranged Trump shall forfeit all the trillions he dreams of seizing from this region. Operational plans have been established for that purpose."

On 15 April 2026, the Financial Times reported that during the 2026 Iran War, Iran used a Chinese satellite to observe US military bases and guide strikes.

== See also ==
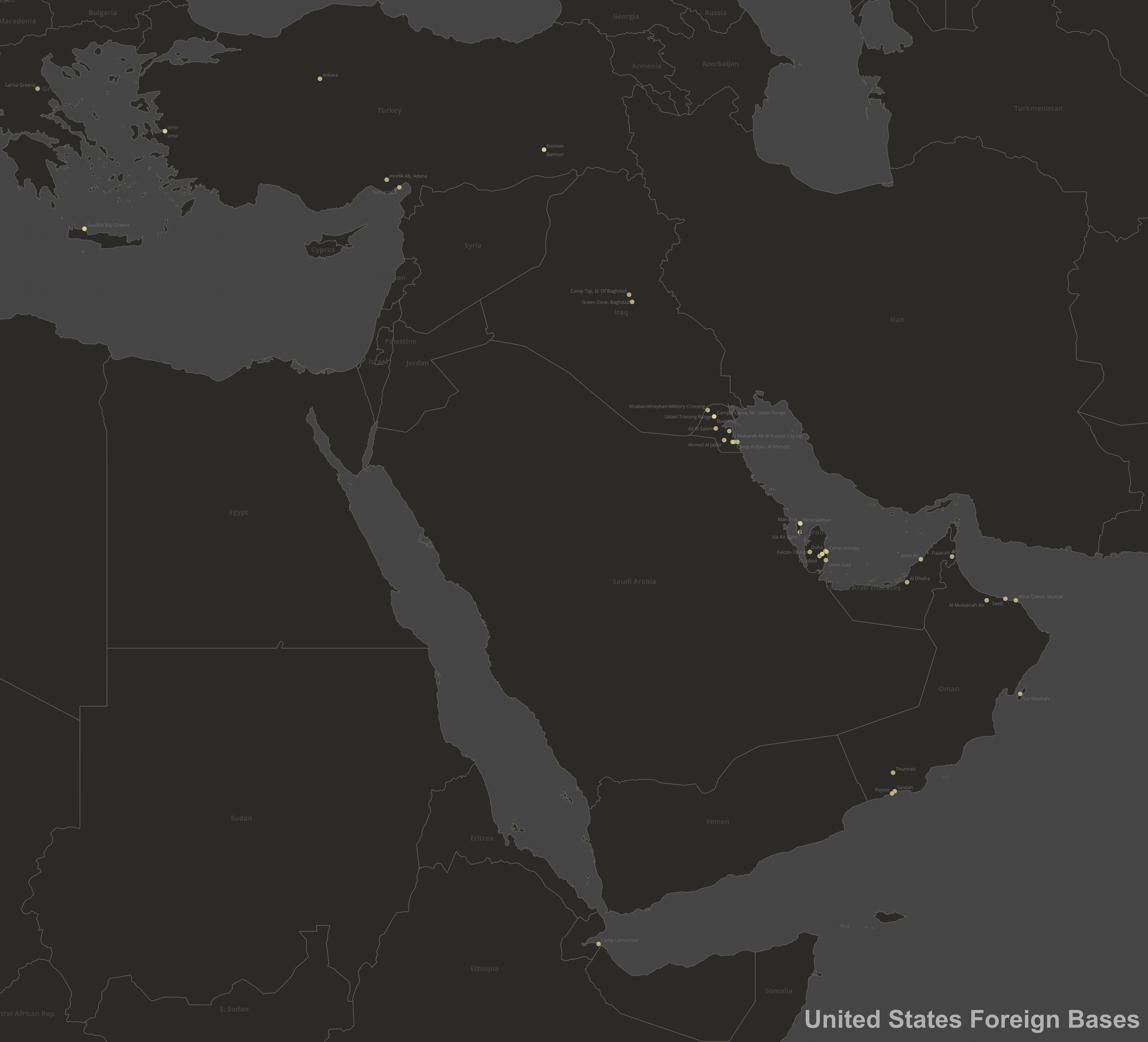
Middle East bases of the United States

- Attacks on the United States
- List of wars involving the United States
- List of US overseas bases
- United States support for Israel in the Gaza war
- Red Sea crisis
- United States foreign policy in the Middle East
