= Saraya Thawrat al-Eshreen al-Thaniya =

Militant organization in Iraq

- سرايا ثورة العشرين الثانية
- Founded: 16 May 2020 (6 years, 5 months, 1 week and 5 days)
- Dates active: 2020–2021
- Dissolved: July 2021
- Country: Iraq
- Allegiance: Islamic Resistance in Iraq
- Active regions: Babil Governorate; Baghdad Governorate; Muthanna Governorate
- Wars: Iraqi conflict; US-led intervention in Iraq (2014–2021); Withdrawal of United States troops from Iraq (2020–2021)

Saraya Thawrat al-Eshreen al-Thaniya (Arabic: سرايا ثورة العشرين الثانية, romanized: saraya thawrat aleishrin althaania, lit. 'The Second 1920 Revolution Brigades') was a militant organization in Iraq.

== History ==
=== Foundation ===
Saraya Thawrat al-Eshreen al-Thaniya was founded on 16 May 2020 in response to the Assassination of Qasem Soleimani, the group was the third "resistance" group in Iraq to declare its position against the United States.

=== Activities ===
The group claimed an attack in May, although the conditions and timing of the attack are unclear.

The group carried out an explosive attack against a convoy of the United States forces on 2 July 2020, in Babil Governorate.

On 12 July 2020, in Najme region between Diwaniyah and As-Samawah, the group attacked four trucks; the trucks were carrying supplies from Basra to one of the US bases in Iraq.

The group became inactive in July 2021, but may be reactivated for other occasions.
