= Mukhtar Army =

Shi'a Iraqi militia group

- جيش المختار
- The flag of the Mukhtar Army. The flag is identifical to the flag of Hezbollah, except for the text under the emblem, with the Muktar Army flag featuring the line "النهضة الاسلامية في العراق" (The Islamic Renaissance in Iraq).
- Leader: Wathiq al-Battat
- Dates active: February 2013 – present
- Country: Iraq
- Allegiance: Iran
- Headquarters: Unknown
- Active regions: Iraq (2013-present); Syria (2013-2024)
- Ideology: Wilayat al Faqih; Khomeinism
- Size: Unknown
- Part of: Axis of Resistance; Popular Mobilization Forces; Islamic Resistance in Iraq
- Wars: Iraqi insurgency War in Iraq (2013–2017); Syrian Civil War

The Mukhtar Army is a Shi'a Iraqi militia group formed in February 2013 by Wathiq al-Battat, a former senior official in the Hezbollah Brigades.

== Formation ==
On 4 February 2013, al-Battat announced the formation of the Mukhtar Army with the stated purpose of protecting Iraq's Shi'as, and to assist the government in combating terrorism. He stated that the Mukhtar Army would prevent any Sunnis controlled by al-Qaeda or other militant sectarian groups from attempting to topple the Shi'a-led government in Iraq.

In a phone interview with the Associated Press, Al-Battat said that the group receives weapons and other support from Iran, and is advised by the Quds Force, a special unit of the Iranian Revolutionary Guard Corps (IRGC) that oversees its external operations. He describes himself as a follower of Ayatollah Ali Khamenei, the Supreme Leader of Iran.

An IRGC official dismissed suggestions it supports any armed group in Iraq, saying that such "claims are aimed at defaming the Guard. We do not see any reason to respond to such baseless claims." A spokesperson for the Hezbollah Brigades also distanced his group from al-Battat and the Mukhtar Army, stating that al-Battat "is not affiliated with the Hezbollah Brigades in any way whatsoever."

Ahmed Abu Risha, the head of the Sunni Anbar Salvation Council, argues that the Mukhtar Army was created with Iraqi government consent to silence Sunni-led protests that began in December 2012.

A few days after the group's formation, the Iraqi government issued an arrest warrant against al-Battat. Speaking on 9 February 2013, Iraqi Prime Minister Nouri al-Maliki called on Iraqi citizens to cooperate with security forces in disclosing the whereabouts of al-Battat in order to arrest him as soon as possible.

== Activities ==
Al-Battat stated that the Mukhtar Army was behind the rocket and mortar attack on 9 February 2013 that killed seven members of the Iranian opposition group Mujahedeen-e Khalq (MEK) housed at Camp Liberty in Baghdad. He threatened more attacks against the MEK until they leave the country.

In mid-February, threatening flyers signed by the Mukhtar Army were placed at Sunni households in Baghdad's Jihad neighborhood. The leaflets warned "enemy" Sunnis to leave now or face "great agony". The Mukhtar Army denied responsibility for the flyers. The Mukhtar Army has also threatened that it will "liberate" Saudi Arabia and target the Mubarak Al Kabeer Port being constructed in Kuwait.

On 21 November 2013, the Mukhtar Army claimed responsibility for six mortar bombs fired into northern Saudi Arabia that landed near a border post. Al-Battat said, "The goal was to send a warning message to the Saudis to tell them that their border stations and patrol are within our range of fire." He also said he wanted Saudi Arabia to stop "interfering" with Iraqi affairs.

== Statements ==
In an interview aired on 5 February 2013 on the Iraqi Al Sharqiya television channel, al-Battat stated, "Allah willing, we shall annihilate the infidel, atheist Saudi regime, and all the regimes that wage war against Islam, incite their peoples to wage war against Islam and the Prophet Muhammad, and support Israel and America.

In an interview aired on 23 October 2013 on the Iraqi Al Sumaria television channel, al-Battat stated, "When it comes to politics, our authority is the leader, Ali Khamenei... I am proud to be a foot soldier in the army of the leader, Sayyed Khamenei." He added, "What is important is the common enemies – the Americans and the Israelis. We must confront them with all our force. After we annihilate the Jews, we can deal with domestic matters.

== Leader ==
The leader of the group, Wathiq Al-Battat had pledged his loyalty to the Supreme Leader of Iran, Ayatollah Ali Khamenei. Al-Battat was arrested briefly on 2 January 2014 but was released despite still being a fugitive. He was allegedly "accidentally assassinated" at point-blank range on 20 December 2014 at a fake police checkpoint in eastern Iraq by an unknown party but was reported alive afterwards and had even appeared in the public eye later on.
