= Islamic Resistance in Iraq =

Islamist insurgent network in Iraq

- المقاومة الإسلامية في العراق
- Flag commonly used by Shiite resistance groups in Iraq.
- Leaders: Ahmad al-Hamidawi (KH); Akram al-Kaabi (HHN); Qais Khazali (AAH); Abu Ala al-Walai (KSS); Haydar Muzhir Ma’lak al-Sa’idi (HAAA)
- Dates active: 2020–present
- Allegiance: Iran; IRGC
- Group: See groups
- Ideology: Shia Islamism; Khomeinism; Anti-Americanism; Anti-Zionism; Anti-Sunnism; Anti-imperialism
- Size: 70,000
- Part of: Axis of Resistance
- Wars: Iran–Israel proxy conflict; Iraqi insurgency (2017–present); Middle Eastern crisis (2023–present); Attacks on US bases during the Gaza war; Israel–Hezbollah conflict (2023–2024); 2024 Iran–Israel conflict; April 2024 Iranian strikes against Israel; Red Sea crisis; 2024 Israeli invasion of Lebanon; June 2025 Iranian strikes on Israel; 2026 Iran war; 2026 Iranian strikes on the Kurdistan Region; Syrian civil war; 2024 Syrian opposition offensives; Deir ez-Zor offensive (2024)

The Islamic Resistance in Iraq (IRI; Arabic: المقاومة الإسلامية في العراق, romanized: al-Muqāwamah al-Islāmīyah fī al-ʻIrāq) refers to an informal network of Iranian-backed Shia Islamist factions in Iraq. The name is used by members of the network when carrying out attacks against American forces or its allies in the region. IRI does not represent the official position of the Iraqi government and consists of militias that operate outside the formal command structure of the Iraqi armed forces. It is part of the Axis of Resistance.

In October 2023, the IRI began launching rockets and drones at US bases in Iraq, Jordan and Syria, causing minor injuries to American servicemen until a drone attack killed three US soldiers in Jordan on 28 January 2024. Since November 2023, the IRI has attacked Israel with multiple drones and missiles. In April 2025, the IRI had said that it was prepared to disarm in order to avert an escalating conflict with the Trump administration.

== Groups ==
=== Current ===
- Asa'ib Ahl al-Haq (AAH)
- Kata'ib Hezbollah (KH)
- Kata'ib Sayyid al-Shuhada (KSS)
- Harakat Hezbollah al-Nujaba (HHN)
- Harakat Ansar Allah al-Awfiya (HAAA)
- Kataib Sarkhat al-Quds (KSQ)
- al-Thawriyyun group
- Saraya Awliya al-Dam (SAD)
- Jaysh al-Ghadab
- True Promise Corps
- Rijal al-Bas al-Shadid

=== Former ===
- Liwa Thar al-Muhandis
- League of the Revolutionaries
- Zulfiqar Forces
- Sariya Qassem al-Jibareen
- Avenger Brigades
- Liwa al-Qasim
- Saraya Thawrat al-Eshreen al-Thaniya

== Arsenal ==
The IRI's arsenal composes of cruise missiles, kamikaze drones and rockets of Iranian origin. These include:

- al-Arqab – a long-range surface-to-surface cruise missile, with a range of 1,650 km (1,030 mi)
- Shahed 101 – A loitering munition, with a range of 900 km (560 mi)
- Shahed 131 – A loitering munition, with a range of 900 km (560 mi). It is the smaller counterpart of the Shahed 136.
- Shahed 136 – A loitering munition, with a range of 2,500 km (1,600 mi). This has not been used and only claimed possession.

== Operations in Iraq, Jordan, and Syria ==
On 18 October 2023, amid the Gaza war, the Islamic Resistance in Iraq began waves of attacks on US bases in both Iraq and Syria, beginning with the launching of a drone strike on al-Asad Airbase which was intercepted.

On 24 October 2023, the Islamic Resistance in Iraq claimed responsibility for multiple drone strikes on US bases in eastern Syria, notably al-Omar oil field in Deir ez-Zor Governorate and al-Shaddadi in Al-Hasakah Governorate.

On 5 November 2023, the Islamic Resistance in Iraq issued a warning ahead of Antony Blinken's visit to Baghdad, saying "Antony Blinken, the son of a Jew, is not welcome in Iraq." As a result of the threats, Blinken wore a bulletproof vest when landing in Baghdad International Airport.

On 9 November 2023, US forces were struck three separate times in 24 hours, including drone strikes in Al-Asad Airbase and Al-Harir Air Base, as well as an IED attack on a patrol near the Mosul Dam.

On 20 November 2023, eight US and coalition soldiers were injured from a ballistic missile attack, and there was minor infrastructural damage after the air base was attacked by a ballistic missile.

On 25 December 2023, the Islamic Resistance in Iraq claimed responsibility for a drone attack on the base which injured three US soldiers, one being critical.

On 18 January 2024, the Islamic Resistance of Iraq claimed it shot down a US MQ-9 Reaper drone after it took off from Kuwait near Muqdadiyah, Diyala Governorate.

On 20 January 2024, the group claimed a missile attack on the Ain Al-Asad Air Base in Al Anbar Govenorate, injuring two US personnel and one Iraqi personnel.

On 28 January 2024, the IRI launched a drone attack on the Tower 22 US military outpost in Rukban, Jordan, killing 3 US soldiers and injuring 47 others.

On 4 February 2024, a drone struck a training ground in Al-Omar field in Deir ez-Zor, eastern Syria, which houses US troops, according to the Syrian Democratic Forces. Though no casualties were reported among US forces, at least seven Kurdish fighters were killed and 18 injured. The Islamic Resistance in Iraq claimed responsibility for the attack. The SDF condemned the attack, and said it had "every right to respond".

On 1 April 2024, Abu Ali al-Askari, security chief of Kata'ib Hezbollah, said the organisation was prepared to arm the Islamic Resistance in Jordan. He declared that Kata'ib Hezbollah is ready to provide "12,000 fighters with light and medium weapons, anti-armor launchers, tactical missiles, millions of rounds of ammunition, and tons of explosives" to "defend the Palestinians and avenge the honour of Muslims." On the same day, al-Tanf garrison in Syria was attacked by a one-way attack drone which was intercepted. Shortly after this announcement, a Jordanian militant attacked an IDF patrol vehicle near the Jordanian-Israeli border and fled. This was the first instance of an attack from Jordan on Israel since the beginning of the war.

== Attacks on Israel ==
Since November 2023, the Islamic Resistance in Iraq has claimed responsibility for drone and missile attacks against targets within Israel in retaliation for Israeli attacks on Palestinian civilians in Gaza. The group stated it would continue to "strike enemy strongholds."

In late January, the Islamic Resistance in Iraq announced it had entered its second phase of operations which included blockading the Mediterranean maritime routes to Israeli ports and disabling the ports.

In November 2024, US officials confirmed that US and partner forces had intercepted Iraqi kamikaze drones launched against Israel. By late October, the ISI had launched drones on an average of around five times a day. In one 24-hour period in October, the ISI launched eight drones at Israel.

Shortly after, Israeli news outlets reported that Israel may target the IRI for its campaign against Israel during its wars on Gaza and on Lebanon. Unnamed officials allegedly told outlets that satellites monitored the transfer of ballistic missiles and related equipment from Iran to Iraqi territory.

List of claimed attacks on Israel
Date	Target	Description	Outcome
2 November 2023	Dead Sea	Claimed responsibility for an attack against a vital Israeli target on the Dead Sea coastline.	Unknown
3 November 2023	Eilat	Claimed responsibility for a missile attack on Eilat.	Unknown
12 November 2023	Eilat	Claimed responsibility for a missile attack on Eilat.	Unknown
21 December 2023	Eilat	Claimed drone attack.	Intercepted by the Royal Jordanian Air Force.
21 December 2023	Karish rig	Claimed drone attack.	Intercepted by IDF fighter jets.
22 December 2023	Eilat	Claimed drone attack.	Intercepted by Royal Jordanian Air Force.
28 December 2023	Fik Airport	Claimed drone attack.	Drone crashed near Eliad, Golan Heights. No casualty or damage reported.
31 December 2023	Golan Heights	Claimed drone attack.	Intercepted by Israeli fighter jets.
31 December 2023	Eilat	Claimed drone attack.	Intercepted by the IDF.
7 January 2024	Golan Heights	Claimed drone attack.	Unknown
7 January 2024	Haifa Port	Claimed responsibility for a missile attack on Haifa Port.	Unknown
22 January 2024	Ashdod	Claimed responsibility for a drone attack on the port of Ashdod.	No verification of the claims.
24 January 2024	Ashdod	Claimed responsibility for a drone strike on the port of Ashdod.	No verification of the claims.
28 January 2024	Eilat	Claimed drone attack.	Unknown
9 February 2024	Dead Sea	Claimed attack.	Unknown
1 March 2024	Haifa Port	Claimed drone strike on a chemical depot in Haifa Port.	Unknown
4 March 2024	Haifa Port	Claimed to target a chemical materials depot in the port of Haifa	Unknown
5 March 2024	Haifa Airport	Claimed drone attack.	No verification of the claims.
6 March 2024	Kiryat Shmona Airport	Claimed drone attack.	Unknown
11 March 2024	Ben Gurion Airport	Claimed drone attack on Ben Gurion Airport.	No verification of the claims. Shortly after the announcement, Jordanian security sources announced the discovery of drone parts in an uninhabited area.
17 March 2024	Fik Airport	Claimed drone attack on an Israeli airbase in the occupied Golan Heights.	No reports of an attack by the Israeli military, however, the Jordanian military confirmed suspicious aerial movements from an unknown source along the Syrian border.
1 April 2024	Eilat	Claimed responsibility for a drone attack on Eilat.	The drone struck an IDF Naval Base causing minor damage to a building and no casualties.
2 April 2024	Ramon Airport	Unidentified drone, allegedly of Iraqi origin.	The drone was either intercepted or failed to strike its target, falling in an open area 200 meters from the Israel-Jordan border.
8 April 2024	Elifelet base	Claimed drone attack.	Unknown
9 April 2024	Eilat	Drone attack on Eilat coming from eastern direction, suggesting it as originating from Iraq.	Shot down with the C-Dome system, marking its first operational use.
9 April 2024	Ashkelon	Attacks	Issuing a statement, the Iraqi Resistance group said that: “the anti-Zionist operations were carried out on a vital target in Ashkelon settlement, Ashkelon port, and another region in occupied Palestine.”
13–14 April 2024	Israel	Attacked Israel alongside other members of the Axis of Resistance with drones and missiles.	Damages caused specifically by Iraqi drones and missiles are unknown.
20 April 2024	Eilat	Claimed the drone attack was in response to the alleged Israeli-American airstrike on the PMU.	Unknown
2 May 2024	Tel Aviv	Claimed launched multiple attacks on Israel using cruise missiles	The attack was carried out with multiple Arqub-type cruise missiles and targeted the Israeli city of Tel Aviv for the first time.
7 May 2024	Eilat	Claimed drone attack.	Intercepted by Israeli fighter jets.
11 May 2024	Southern Israel	An attack with a cruise missile	A Shiite militia in Iraq on Saturday claimed responsibility for an attack with a cruise missile on a military airbase in Israel.
20 May 2024	Eilat	Claimed three drone attacks.	Intercepted by Israeli fighter jets and warship.
23 May 2024	Eilat	Claimed drone attack.	Both drones intercepted by Israeli fighter jets.
24 May 2024	Haifa Port	Claimed drone attack.	Intercepted drone with Israeli fighter jets.
27 May 2024	Eilat	Claimed three drone attacks.	Intercepted by Israeli fighter jets and warship.
5 June 2024	Ships in Haifa Port	Claimed two joint drone attacks in coordination with the Houthis against ships in Haifa Port.	Denied by Israel.
12 June 2024	Ashdod	Claimed cruise missiles were fired at critically important target in Ashdod in coordination with the Houthis.	Claimed successful by Yemeni Houthis and Islamic Resistance in Iraq.
12 June 2024	Haifa Port	Claimed drone attack on important target in Haifa in coordination with the Houthis.	Claimed successful by Yemeni Houthis and Islamic Resistance in Iraq.
22 June 2024	Ships in Haifa Port	Claimed drone attacks on four vessels in Haifa port in coordination with the Houthis.	An explosion occurred in Haifa after an air-defense missile was launched towards the sea. Israel did not comment on the claim, but stated it shot down a drone approaching from the east.
26 June 2024	Eilat	Claimed drone attack on vital target.	IDF confirmed it failed to intercept the drone and that it exploded near Eilat. The anti-air missile struck the water off the coast of Eilat.
8 July 2024	Eilat	Claimed drone attacks on Eilat in coordination with the Houthis.	Intercepted drones from Red Sea direction with Israeli fighter jets.
18 September 2024	Near Sea of Galilee	Israel claimed a drone was launched from Iraq.	Intercepted the drone with Israeli fighter jets.
22 September 2024	Southern and northern Israel	Claimed multiple cruise missile and drone attacks on targets in northern and southern Israel.	Intercepted cruise missiles and drones using anti-air missiles and Israeli fighter jets.
22 September 2024	Golani observation base	Claimed drone attack.	Israeli military says interceptors were launched towards the UAV
25 September 2024	Military base in Arava desert	Claimed drone attack.	IDF says drone impacted military base in Arava desert, causing damage but no injuries.
25 September 2024	Northern Golan Heights	Claimed drone attacks.	Two drones struck open areas in the northern Golan Heights, sparking fires.
25 September 2024	Eilat	Israel claimed two drones were launched from Iraq. The Iraqi resistance confirmed their responsibility.	IDF says one drone impacted the Eilat port, causing damage and wounding two people, while the other drone was intercepted by a Sa'ar 5-class corvette.
3 October 2024	Golani military base	Claimed drone attacks.	IDF confirms the drone attack killed two IDF soldiers and injured 24 others.
20 October 2024	Eilat	Claimed drone attacks.	A drone launched from Iraq at Israel was shot down by Israeli air defenses.
25 October 2024	Eilat and northern Israel	Claimed three drone attacks.	Unknown

== Intervention in the Israel–Hezbollah conflict ==
On 9 January 2024, the Kata'ib Hezbollah spokesperson Jafar al-Husseini warned that the Islamic Resistance in Iraq would help Hezbollah fight Israel if war erupted between the two sides. This statement came a few weeks after the Islamic Resistance in Iraq claimed responsibility for a drone attack on the Karish gas field which Lebanon claims to hold sovereignty over. In June 2024, many Iraqi officials within the IRI network vowed to support Hezbollah with soldiers if the conflict with Israel escalated into an all-out war.

On 24 June 2024, Qais al-Khazali, the leader of Asa'ib Ahl al-Haq, stated in a televised speech that if the US continued to support Israel in expanding the war to Lebanon and Hezbollah, the group would begin to attack US interests in Iraq and the Middle East.

== Involvement in the 2024 Iran–Israel conflict ==
In Iran's missile and drone strikes against Israel, the Islamic Resistance in Iraq had contributed to the attacks on Israel, alongside Iran, the Yemeni Houthis, and an unidentified faction in Syria. This was by their launch of drones and missiles at targets in Israel. The United States, United Kingdom, and Jordan intercepted many of the drones but many did hit various locations within Israel and the occupied Golan Heights.

In response to alleged Israeli bombardment of Popular Mobilization Forces bases in Iraq, which killed a soldier and injured several others, the Islamic Resistance in Iraq claimed a drone attack targeting Eilat.

== Intervention in the United States–Houthi conflict ==
On 11 January 2024, the Islamic Resistance in Iraq said that if Yemen is attacked by the US and UK, "we will attack the Americans' base with everything in our power". After the initial US-UK airstrikes on Yemen, there were reports of a bomb and sirens being heard at the US Embassy in Iraq. In the same month, the Islamic Resistance in Iraq launched a drone attack on a US base in Jordan, killing three US soldiers and injuring 47 others.

== US retaliation airstrikes ==
On 21 November 2023, a US AC-130-gunship struck a Kata'ib Hezbollah vehicle near Abu Ghraib, Iraq in response to the Islamic Resistance In Iraq's 20 November attack on Ain al Assad Airbase.

On 2 February 2024, the US launched retaliatory airstrikes targeting Iran-backed militias in Iraq and Syria, in response to an attack that killed three US troops in Jordan. On 7 February, a US drone strike on a vehicle in the Mashtal neighborhood of Baghdad killed a commander of Kata'ib Hezbollah Abu Baqir Al-Saadi.

== Intervention in the 2026 US-Iran war ==
On 14 March 2026, the Kataib Hezbollah faction launched a drone that breached the air defenses of the Camp Victory base and managed to strike it. On 17 March 2026, the Saraya Awliya al-Dam faction published a footage of a reconnaissance drone flying above the US embassy compound in baghdad. According to an observer the footage is consistent with the footage obtained from a Fiber optic drone suggesting that the group had acquired such advanced technology. On the 21st March 2026 the Ashab al-Kahf faction claimed responsibility for killing a French soldier in an attack on a base in Iraq, and on the same day set the Camp Victory base ablaze. On 25 March 2026 an AN/MPQ-64 Sentinel along with a Black Hawk was struck at the Victory Base Complex in Bahgdad by an IRI fibre optic drone.

== See also ==
- Iranian intervention in Iraq (2014–present)
