= Mission Support Site Conoco =

American airbase in Syria (2014–2025)

- Deir ez-Zor Governorate in Syria

Site information
- Owner: (United States) U.S. forces (formerly)
- Operator: CJTF–OIR

Site history
- Built: 2014
- Demolished: 2025
- Battles/wars: Syrian civil war Iran–Israel proxy conflict

Mission Support Site Conoco, a.k.a. Mission Support Site Euphrates, was an American airfield near the town of Khsham in Deir ez-Zor Governorate, Syria, and served to support the multi-national Combined Joint Task Force – Operation Inherent Resolve. The airbase, built with the 2014 launch of Operation Resolve and the American intervention in the Syrian civil war, is 5 miles (8.0 km) away from the Syrian outpost Conoco; the use of Conoco in the two names reflects names attached to the petroleum production sites in the area which were originally developed by American company Conoco.

In 2018, Mission Support Site Conoco provided tactical support, ground troops and air strikes during a four-hour long overnight attack on outpost Conoco by a combined force of Syrian government troops and Russian Wagner Group mercenaries. In 2023 and 2024, it was reported that Mission Support Site Conoco had been the target of numerous attacks by Iranian proxy groups and the former Syrian Arab Armed Forces under the Ba'athist regime.

After the December 2024 fall of the Assad regime, the United States reduced its military presence in Syria, and Mission Support Site Conoco was vacated in May 2025.

== See also ==
- List of American military installations
