= Kataib Sarkhat al-Quds =

Shia Islamist paramilitary group in Iraq

Kataib Sarkhat Al-Quds
- كتائب صرخة القدس
- Dates active: August 19, 2024 - present
- Active regions: Iraq
- Ideology: Shia Islamism; Anti-Americanism; Anti-Zionism; Anti-LGBT; Qutbism–Khomeinism
- Political position: Right-wing to far-right
- Part of: Axis of Resistance; Popular Mobilization Forces; Islamic Resistance in Iraq

Kataib Sarkhat al-Quds (Arabic: كتائب صرخة القدس, lit. 'Jerusalem Cry Brigades') is the successor organization to Ashab al-Kahf, an Iraqi Shia paramilitary group part of the Iraqi Popular Mobilization Forces (PMF) and the Islamic Resistance in Iraq (IRI).

== History ==
On 19 August 2024, Ashab al-Kahf announced that it had reformed as "Kataib Sarkhat al-Quds", claiming that the group was "confirming the truth that we affirmed in this battle since its inception in that our goals are not limited to the borders of Sykes-Picot, which were imposed by the colonizers on our Islamic world." Analysts claim that the group's refoundation was "an indication that Kataib Sarkhat al-Quds is trying to expand its operations beyond Iraq."

On 27 August 2024, the group threatened to attack the Israeli Soreq Nuclear Research Center.

On 16 September 2024, Kataib Sarkhat al-Quds threatened to attack an Israeli military industrial site near Tel Aviv.

On 20 September 2024, the group announced it had "prepared to send hundreds or even thousands of militants to Lebanon to support Hezbollah against Israel," and had threatened to attack the Israel Institute for Biological Research.

On 13 October 2024, Kataib Sarkhat al-Quds released a video threatening to attack several electric power transmission systems within the Middle East, including the Port of Jebel Ali, Port of Mina Salman, Jordan River Crossing, two unspecified gas facilities in Saudi Arabia, and an Aramco gas facility.

On 15 March 2025, the group released a statement directed at Houthi leader Abdul-Malik al-Houthi, condemning the March 2025 United States attacks in Yemen, and declaring "full readiness to "respond to these crimes by targeting American interests in the region wherever they exist and using appropriate means to make them pay for their crimes against our people".

In a video clip featuring the image of the former leader of the Lebanese Hezbollah group Sayyed Hassan Nasrallah, Abbas Shield Martyrdom Forces, Ya Ali Popular Formations and the Kataib Sarkhat al-Quds have threatened to take action in Syria and against the United States.
