= Liwa Thar al-Muhandis =

Militant organization in Iraq

- لواء ثأر المهندس
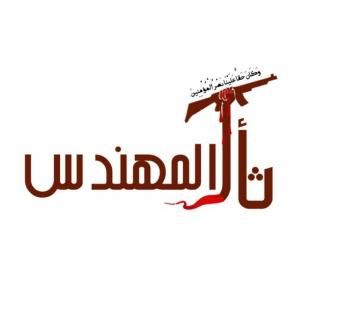
- Founded: May 21, 2020
- Dates active: 2020 — 2023; 2026 — present
- Country: Iraq
- Active regions: Baghdad Governorate
- Wars: Iraqi conflict; US-led intervention in Iraq (2014–2021); 2019–2021 Persian Gulf crisis; Withdrawal of United States troops from Iraq (2020–2021); Iran–Israel conflict; Middle Eastern crisis (2023–present); 2026 Iran war
- Website: Telegram channel

Liwa Thar al-Muhandis (Arabic: لواء ثأر المهندس, romanized: liwa' thar almuhandis, lit. 'al-Mohandes’s Revenge Brigade') is a militant organization in Iraq.

== History ==
=== 2020 ===
The group appeared on May 21, where it claimed an attack on May 6, against the Baghdad International Airport and another on April 17, against US Chinook helicopters in Baghdad with two missiles.

=== 2021 ===
On July 7, the group declared that "The U.S. military will pay the price for the martyrs", after launching 12 rockets towards the Al-Asad Airbase.

=== 2022 ===
On July 20, The group claimed responsibility for a rocket launcher attack on the Turkish base in Zilkan. On August 21, the group attacked a convoy that was transporting supplies for the International Coalition, with a IED in the Saladin Governorate. During the 2022 Gaza–Israel clashes, the group condemned Israel and that "Israel would cease to exist if Allah wills it".

=== 2023 ===
On June 15, the group claimed the murder of an American soldier in 2017, which contradicted the group founding in 2020.

=== 2026 ===
In 2026, the group claimed responsibility for an attack, during the Iran war.
