= Ashab al-Kahf (militant group) =

Iraqi Shia militant group (2019–2024)

- أصحاب الکهف
- Logo
- Dates active: August 2019 – August 2024; March 2026 – present
- Active regions: Iraq
- Ideology: Shia Islamism; Anti-Americanism; Anti-Zionism; Anti-LGBT; Anti-Anarchism; Qutbism–Khomeinism
- Political position: Right-wing to far-right
- Part of: Popular Mobilization Forces; Islamic Resistance in Iraq; Axis of Resistance

Ashab al-Kahf (Arabic: أصحاب الکهف, lit. 'People of the Cave'; sometimes Cave Companions) is an Iraqi Shia extremist militant group that is described as a proxy of Iran. The group first emerged in August 2019, but increased in activity following the American assassination of Qasem Soleimani. It attacked targets associated with the United States using rockets and improvised explosive devices. The group also attacked targets associated with Turkey. The group denied maintaining relationships with other Iranian-backed Shia paramilitary groups, such as Kata'ib Hezbollah and Asa'ib Ahl al-Haq.

It has claimed responsibility for IED attacks on US convoys since March 2020, and at least one missile attack on the US Embassy on 17 November 2020. Several local media outlets accused Cave Companions of being involved in the assassination of civil activists and Critics of Iranian influence in Iraq during the 2019–2021 Iraqi protests. On August 19, 2024, the group announced that it had reformed as Kataib Sarkhat al-Quds. In March 2026, they claimed responsibility for attacks on U.S. facilities in Southern Kurdistan during the Iran war.

== Links to Asa'ib Ahl al-Haq ==
The majority of evidence shows that "Cave Companions" is affiliated with Asa'ib Ahl al-Haq. The fact that the attacks claimed by the "Cave Companions" are carried out near the areas under the control of "Asa'ib Ahl al-Haq".

== Name ==
The group was named after the story of the Seven Sleepers, in Arabic called "Cave Companions". The name was also derived from the fact that the group attacks targets and then hides, and the cave is the meaning of its safe places.

== History ==
The group announced its existence on Twitter in August 2019 following several suspected Israeli airstrikes on Shia militant groups in Iraq. However, there is speculation that the group may have been active since 2017 but refrained from launching attacks against U.S. forces due to their role in the military efforts against the Islamic State. After its announcement, the group threatened retaliation against future attacks, stating "Americans and the Israelis should know that bombings will be met with bombings, assassinations for assassinations, and kidnappings for kidnappings".

In May 2020, the group criticized the leaders of other Iranian-backed Shia paramilitary groups through their Telegram channel, claiming some were "traitors" secretly advancing the interests of the United States and Israel, while others were morally corrupt. The group stated Qasem Soleimani and Abu Mahdi al-Muhandis were "backstabbed" by such groups. It added cooperation with the administration of Iraqi prime minister Mustafa Al-Kadhimi was impossible because he is a "CIA agent".

On 11 August 2020, Ashab al-Kahf claimed it had bombed a US logistics convoy near the Iraqi border with Kuwait. The group stated that it had destroyed "equipment and vehicles belonging to the American enemy" and released an 11-second video showing an explosion. Iraq and Kuwait stated no such attack took place.

On 27 October 2020, Ashab al-Kahf offered a reward between $20,000 and US$50,000 to Iraqis who could supply information concerning the activities of investors and economists from the United States, Saudi Arabia, the United Arab Emirates and the United Kingdom.

On 17 November 2020, three rockets targeted the Embassy of the United States in Baghdad's Green Zone. The Iraqi Army stated one rocket landed in a civilian area, killing a young child and injuring five civilians. Ashab al-Kahf claimed responsibility for the attack through Telegram. American officials stated that American facilities and personnel were unharmed.

The group condemned the reopening of the Arar border crossing between Iraq and Saudi Arabia, stating it was committed to the "rejection of the Saudi project in Iraq".

On 10 December 2020, Ashab al-Kahf threatened to attack US bases throughout the Middle East. These include four U.S. bases in Kuwait, Ali Al Salem Air Base, Camp Arifjan, Camp Virginia, and Camp Buehring as well as Al Udeid Air Base in Qatar.

On 25 December 2020, the "Cave Companions" group joined the fierce media campaign to release a member of "Asa'ib Ahl al-Haq", and issued statements confirming its willingness to take to the street if the leadership of "Asa'ib Ahl al-Haq" ordered to do so.

In December 2020 and early January 2021, accounts linked to the group on social media published veiled criticism of the Kata'ib Hezbollah militia's strategy. This rift appeared to have ended on 6 January, while "Cave Companions" changed its slogan to an image closer in style to other "resistance" groups.

On 15 February 2021, the group attacked a Turkish military base in Mosul.

On 7 April 2022, a coalition resupply convoy was struck by a roadside bomb in al-Hasakah Governorate, Syria. The exclusive video footage of the destroyed vehicle was aired by Ashab al-Kahf.

In November 2022, Ashab al-Kahf claimed responsibility for killing the US citizen, Stephen Troll, in Baghdad, Iraq in retaliation for the assassination of Qasem Soleimani and Abu Mahdi al-Muhandis. The US State Department stated that the American was killed in a failed kidnapping attempt.

In July 2023, following Quran burnings in Sweden, the group issued a statement saying they would "target all commercial and economic interests of Sweden in Iraq".

On August 19, 2024, Ashab al-Kahf announced that it had reformed as "Kataib Sarkhat al-Quds", claiming that the group was "confirming the truth that we affirmed in this battle since its inception in that our goals are not limited to the borders of Sykes-Picot, which were imposed by the colonizers on our Islamic world." Analysts claim that the group's refoundation was "an indication that Kataib Sarkhat al-Quds is trying to expand its operations beyond Iraq."

During the 2026 Iran war, Ashab al-Kahf claimed responsibility for killing a French soldier in an attack on a base in Iraq. On the same day, the group also set the Camp Victory base ablaze.
