= List of wars involving Jordan =

This is a list of wars involving the Hashemite Kingdom of Jordan and its predecessor state.

== Emirate of Transjordan (1921–1946) ==
Conflict	Jordan and allies	Opponents	Result	Monarch	Jordanian losses
Kura Rebellion (1921-1923)	(Kingdom of Hejaz) Transjordan; United Kingdom	Sheikh Kulaib's militia	Government victory	Abdullah I	+15 dead Unknown wounded Unknown captured
Adwan Rebellion (1923)	Transjordan; United Kingdom: Pro-Hashemite tribesmen	(Emirate of Transjordan) Sultan Adwan's forces	Government victory: Sultan Adwan's defeat and exile	Abdullah I	~100 dead Unknown wounded Unknown captured
Ikhwan raids on Transjordan (1922–1924)	Transjordan: Bani Sakher; Adwan; Ajarma; Abbad; Bani Hasan; Bani Hamaida; Bani Hadid; Support: United Kingdom: Royal Air Force	Ikhwan: 'Utaybah; Mutayr	Victory: Uqair Protocol of 1922	Abdullah I	~200 dead Unknown wounded Unknown captured
Anglo-Iraqi War (1941) (Note: On 30 May Rashid Ali and his supporters fled to Iran. At 4 am on 31 May, the Mayor of Baghdad signed an armistice on a bridge across the Washash Canal. Mercol, Gocol, and Harcol operations against guerrillas continued into June.)	United Kingdom: India; (Assyrian homeland) Assyrian levies; Mandatory Palestine; Transjordan; Iraq (Abd Al-Ilah loyalists) Air and naval support: Australia (Note: HMAS Yarra, representing Australia, participated at sea.); New Zealand (Note: HMNZS Leander, representing New Zealand, participated at sea.); Greece (Note: Greek airmen undergoing training at Habbaniya flew sorties against the Iraqis.)	Iraq (Golden Square) Military support: Germany; Italy; Vichy France	Victory: Rebellion suppressed	Abdullah I	~50 dead Unknown wounded Unknown captured
Syria–Lebanon Campaign (1941)	United Kingdom: India; (Assyrian homeland) Assyrian levies; Mandatory Palestine; Palmach; Transjordan; Australia; Free France; Czechoslovakia	Vichy France: Syria; Lebanon; Supported by: Germany	Victory: Syria and Lebanon taken over by Free France	Abdullah I	~50 dead Unknown wounded Unknown captured

== Hashemite Kingdom of Jordan (1946–present) ==
Conflict	Jordan and allies	Opponents	Result	Monarch	Jordanian losses
First Arab–Israeli War (1948–1949)	Arab League: Egypt; All-Palestine Protectorate (Note: After 22 September 1948); Holy War Army; Transjordan; Iraq; Syria; Lebanon (Note: Lebanon had decided to not participate in the war and only took part in the battle of al-Malikiya on 5–6 June 1948.); Saudi Arabia; Yemen Irregulars: Arab Liberation Army; Al-Najjada; Holy War Army	Israel Before 26 May 1948: (Israel) Yishuv; Paramilitary groups: Haganah; Palmach; Hish; Him; Irgun; Lehi; Allied Bedouin tribes After 26 May 1948: Israel Defense Forces; Minorities Unit; Foreign volunteers: Mahal	Partial victory (overall Arab defeat): Tactical and strategic Arab failure; 1949 Armistice Agreements; Establishment of the State of Israel, Jordanian annexation of the West Bank, Egyptian occupation of the Gaza Strip; 1948 Palestinian expulsion and flight; Beginning of the Palestinian Fedayeen insurgency	Abdullah I	~1,000 dead Unknown wounded Unknown captured
Alleged Jordanian military coup attempt (1957)	(Jordan) Jordanian Government	(Jordan) Jordanian Free Officers	Alleged coup attempt failed: Disembodiment of Palestinian-dominated army units; Imposition of martial law	Hussein	None
Jordanian crises (1958)	(Jordan) Jordanian Government Supported by: United Kingdom; United States	(Jordan) Jordanian Free Officers Supported by: United Arab Republic	Government victory: Weakening of anti-Hashemite and Nasserist actors in Jordan; Strengthening of Hussein's rule; End of martial law	Hussein	None
Attack on Samu (1966)	Jordan	Israel	Build up to the Six-Day War	Hussein	16 dead 54 wounded None captured
Six-Day War (1967)	Egypt; Syria; Jordan; Iraq; Minor involvement: Lebanon	Israel	Defeat: Israel occupies a total of 70,000 km^{2} (27,000 sq mi) of territory: The Golan Heights from Syria; The West Bank including East Jerusalem from Jordan; The Gaza Strip and the Sinai Peninsula from Egypt	Hussein	~700 dead ~2,500 wounded -533 captured
War of Attrition (1967–1970)	Egypt; Soviet Union; Kuwait; PLO; Jordan; Syria; Cuba	Israel	Inconclusive	Hussein	~300 dead ~250 wounded -4 captured
Black September (1970–1971)	Jordan: Jordanian Armed Forces	PLO: Fatah; Popular Front for the Liberation of Palestine (PFLP); Democratic Front for the Liberation of Palestine (DFLP); Syria (until November 1970): Syrian Armed Forces; Palestine Liberation Army (PLA); Supported by: Organization of Iranian People's Fedai Guerrillas (OIPFG); People's Mojahedin Organization of Iran (MEK)	Victory: Syrian invasion repelled; Palestinian militants expelled to Lebanon; Formation of the Black September Organization	Hussein	537 dead 1,500 wounded Unknown captured
Yom Kippur War (1973)	Egypt; Syria; Expeditionary forces Saudi Arabia Algeria Jordan Libya Iraq Kuwait Tunisia Morocco Cuba North Korea	Israel	Inconclusive (limited involvement) Analyses differ on the militarily outcome of the war; as an Israeli victory by some military historians, and by others, as a military stalemate.: At the final ceasefire: Egyptian forces held 1,200 km^{2} (460 sq mi) on the eastern bank of the canal.; Israeli forces held 1,600 km^{2} (620 sq mi) on the western bank of the canal.; Israeli forces held 500 km^{2} (193 sq mi) of the Syrian Bashan region of the Golan Heights.	Hussein	23 dead 77 wounded None captured
Sa'dah War (2009–2010)	Yemen; Hashed tribesmen Saudi Arabia; Alleged support: Morocco; Jordan	Houthis; Alleged support: Iran: Quds Force; Hezbollah	Stalemate: Ceasefire after rebels accepted the government's truce conditions.	Abdullah II	None
Jordanian uprisings (2011-2012)	Government of Jordan; Public Security Directorate; General Directorate of Gendarmerie; General Intelligence Department	(Jordan) Jordanian opposition parties • Muslim Brotherhood • Leftist parties • Trade unions	Government victory; reforms implemented: In February 2011, King Abdullah II dismisses Prime Minister Rifai and his cabinet; In October 2011, Abdullah dismisses Prime Minister Bakhit and his cabinet after complaints of slow progress on promised reforms; In April 2012, as the protests continues, Al-Khasawneh resigned, and the King appoints Fayez al-Tarawneh as the new Prime Minister of Jordan; In October 2012, King Abdullah dissolves the parliament for new early elections, and appoints Abdullah Ensour as the new Prime Minister of Jordan	Abdullah II	2 dead 13 injured None captured
Libyan Civil War (2011)	(Libya) Anti-Gaddafi forces Qatar NATO: Belgium; Bulgaria; Canada; Denmark; France; Greece; Italy; Netherlands; Norway; Poland (only humanitarian and medical aid); Romania; Spain; Turkey; United Kingdom; United States; Other countries: Jordan; Sweden; United Arab Emirates; Minor border clashes: Tunisia: Tunisian Army; Tunisian Police; Supported by: Egypt	Libyan Arab Jamahiriya	Victory: Complete overthrow and collapse of the Gaddafi regime.; Killing of Muammar Gaddafi and end of his rule over Libya on 20 October 2011; Start and continuation of the Libyan Crisis; Assumption of interim control by National Transitional Council (NTC); remained in power until August 8, 2012; UN authorisation of NATO led military intervention; Diplomatic recognition of NTC as sole governing authority for Libya by 105 countries, UN, EU, AL and AU; Factional violence in the aftermath of the war leading to another civil war between 2014 and 2020.	Abdullah II	None
Jordanian-Syrian border conflict (2012-2018)	Jordan (Syrian opposition) Free Syrian Army; Supported by: United States Ahrar al-Sham; Hay'at Tahrir al-Sham	Syria; Hezbollah Supported by: Iran; Russia Islamic State: Khalid ibn al-Walid Army	Victory: Jordan restores control over the Jordanian-Syrian border; Syrian government loses a majority of the borders; All infiltration attempts into Jordan foiled.	Abdullah II	21 dead Several wounded None captured
Jordanian intervention in the Syrian civil war (2014-2018)	Jordan; Jordanian Armed Forces; Royal Jordanian Air Force; Public Security Directorate; General Intelligence Department	Islamic State: Khalid ibn al-Walid Army	Victory: 2018 Jordanian airstrikes in Syria; Start of Operation Martyr Muath; Death of former ISIS leaders	Abdullah II	1 dead
Intervention in Yemen (2015-present)	Saudi Arabia The Alliance: United Arab Emirates Sudan (2015–19) Bahrain Kuwait South Korea (Note: soldiers not yet deployed in 2018 but did provided intel about Houthis) Qatar (2015–17) Egypt Jordan Morocco (2015–19) Senegal (Note: soldiers not yet deployed in 2016) Academi contractors (2015–16) Saudi-paid Yemeni mercenaries; Supported by: United States; U.S. Navy (Note: logistic support and assistance with the naval blockade of Houthi-held territories in October 2016); United States Army (Special Forces) United Kingdom (Note: training, intelligence, logistical support, weapons, and blockade up to 2017) France Canada Malaysia Australia; In support of: Republic of Yemen (Presidential Leadership Council); Yemeni Armed Forces; Yemeni Air Force; Hirak; Popular Resistance Committee; Al-Islah Movement	Revolutionary Committee/Supreme Political Council: Houthi militants; Yemen Army (pro-Saleh and Houthis) (2015–17); Yemeni Republican Guard (2015–17); Allies: Iran (alleged by USA, denied by Iran) North Korea (according to USA and South Korea); Al-Qaeda: AQAP	Ongoing	Abdullah II	None
Druze insurgency in Southern Syria: Operation Jordanian Deterrence	Jordan Syria	Syrian Drug smugglers Druze insurgents	Ongoing	Abdullah II	None
Iran War (2026); Part of the Middle Eastern crisis (2023–present): 2026 Iranian strikes on Jordan	Israel; United States; Attacked by Iran: Azerbaijan; Bahrain; Iraq; Kurdistan Region; Jordan; Kuwait; NATO; Turkey; United Kingdom (Note: Has also undertaken defensive deployments outside of Akrotiri and Dhekelia); Akrotiri and Dhekelia; Oman; Qatar; Saudi Arabia; Syria; United Arab Emirates; Defensive actions: France; Greece; Italy; Netherlands; Spain	Iran; Axis of Resistance; Hezbollah (since 2 March); Popular Mobilization Forces; Islamic Resistance in Iraq	Ongoing	Abdullah II	None

== Other armed conflicts involving Jordan ==
• 1952 barrel incident

• 1955 Madaba riot - Anti-Christian massacre in Madaba perpetrated by Islamist and nationalist Jordanian rioters.

• Operation Samaria (1956)

• War over Water (Jordan River) (1964 - 1967)
