= Tell Shihab =

Tell Shihab تل شهاب
- Village
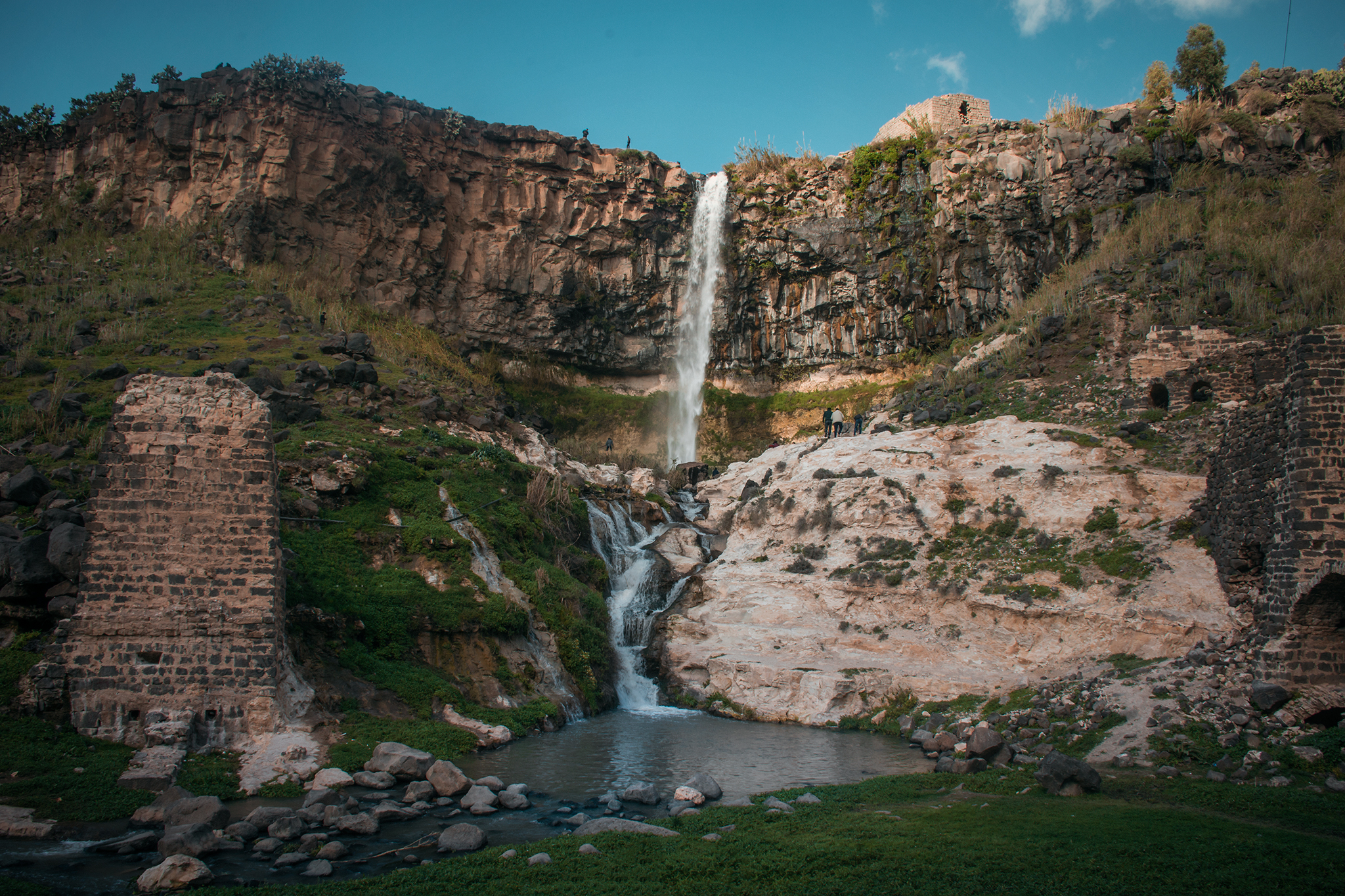
- Tel Shihab Falls

- Location within Syria
- Coordinates: 32°41′19″N 35°59′20″E
- PAL: 241/233
- Country: Syria
- Governorate: Daraa Governorate
- District: Daraa District
- Nahiyah: Muzayrib

Population (2004 census)
  - Total: 9,430
- Time zone: UTC+3 (AST)

Tell Shihab (Arabic: تل شهاب; also spelled Tell esh-Shihab or Tal Shehab) is a village in southern Syria, administratively part of the Daraa Governorate, located northwest of Daraa on the Jordan-Syria border. Nearby localities include al-Shaykh Saad and Nawa to the north, Muzayrib, Da'el and Tafas to the northeast, and al-Yadudah to the east. According to the Syria Central Bureau of Statistics, Tell Shihab had a population of 9,430 in the 2004 census.

== Etymology ==
The town's name is "purely Arabic" according to George Adam Smith, and "Tell Shihab" is translated as "Mound of the Warrior."

== History ==
=== Ancient ===
Tell Shihab is one of the places believed to be the site of the ancient city of Yeno'am. The stele, missing the lower part, was built into the wall of a local house, and shows Seti I with Amun-Ra and Mut. Wilhelm Max Müller argued that the stela did not commemorate the victory, but rather expressed the loyalty of the dedicator to his king. Bronze Age pottery sherds were also found on the site during excavations conducted by William Foxwell Albright in 1925.

=== Ottoman ===
In 1838, Eli Smith noted that the place was located west of the Hajj road, and that it was populated with Sunni Muslims. At the end of the 19th century, the village had 750 inhabitants and 160 houses, and was described as "blossoming". In the early 20th-century, the sheikhs of Tell Shihab belonged to a powerful family in the area and relative prosperity of the town allowed them to accumulate large amounts of wealth. According to Smith, who visited in 1900, "nearly all the villagers look happy and comfortable."

=== Civil war ===
During the current anti-government uprising in Syria, opposition rebels gained control of Tell Shihab and it has since been used as a major crossing point for Syrian refugees fleeing to Jordan. On 6 September 2012, the Syrian Army launched an assault on the town with the backing of 20 tanks, according to opposition activists. A number of houses were allegedly raided and some people were detained by the authorities.

== Geography ==
Tell Shihab is situated on the promontory formed by the junction of Wadi al-Meddan and Wadi Tell Shihab, which represents the modern borders between Syria and Jordan. With the presence of several wadis there is an abundance of water in the town. It is one of the lowest-lying towns in the mountainous Hauran region, with an elevation of over 1,000 feet (300 m) above sea level. Surrounding Tell Shihab are stretches of wheat fields.

== Bibliography ==
- Müller, Max (1904). "The Egyptian Monument of Tell Esh-Shihab". Quarterly Statement - Palestine Exploration Fund. 36: 78–80. doi:10.1179/peq.1904.36.1.78.
- Naʼaman, Nadav (2005). Canaan in the 2nd Millennium B.C.E. Eisenbrauns. ISBN 9781575061139.
- Robinson, E.; Smith, E. (1841). Biblical Researches in Palestine, Mount Sinai and Arabia Petraea: A Journal of Travels in the year 1838. Vol. 3. Boston: Crocker & Brewster.
- Schumacher (1889): Across the Jordan; being an exploration and survey of part of Hauran and Jaulan p 201 ff
- Schumacher, G. (1897). "Der Südliche Basan". Zeitschrift des Deutschen Palästina-Vereins. 19–20: 65–227.
- Smith, George (1897). "Notes of a Journey through Hauran, with inscriptions found by the way". Quarterly Statement - Palestine Exploration Fund. 32–33: 340–361.
- Wimmer, Stefan Jakob (18 April 2002). A New Stela of Ramesses II in Jordan in the Context of Egyptian Royal Stelae in the Levant (PDF). Third International Congress on the Archaeology of the Ancient Near East (3ICAANE). Paris, France.
