= Al-Turrah =

City in Irbid, Jordan

Al-Turra
- Location within Jordan
- Coordinates: 32°38′N 35°59′E
- PAL: 242/227
- Country: Irbid Governorate Jordan
- Established: A few centuries BC

Area
  - Total: 28 km^{2} (11 sq mi)
- Elevation: 478 m (1,568 ft)

Population
  - Total: 34,948
  - Density: 1,248/km^{2} (3,230/sq mi)
- Time zone: +2
- Postal code: 21310
- Area code: 962-2
- Geocode: 250179

Al-Turra is a Jordanian city located in the Irbid Governorate in the far north of the country near the international border with Syria. Al-Turra is the largest community within the Hauran Plain Municipality and is therefore considered its main center. Its population in 2017 was 34,948, the seventh largest in Irbid Governorate. (Note: This is after Irbid, Ramtha, Idun, Beit Ras, Sarih, and Hassan.) It has an area of about 28,000 dunums (28 square kilometers). Al-Turra's territory extends to the east and north, bordering the Syrian border, while Al-Shajara and Ramtha's territory borders it to the west and south.

Since ancient times, Al-Turra has been known for its cultivation of grain, which for many years was the only agricultural crop in the city and the entire Hauran Plain region. It was only in the last quarter of the last century that, with a few exceptions, the cultivation of trees such as olives and, to a lesser extent, figs, grapes, pomegranates and other crops became known. The valley that runs through it is known as Wadi al-Shumar because of the abundance of Shumar (Fennel) plants that grow there. The city is divided into the areas of Al-Kuklia, Al-Foul, Al-Halan, Al-Khalla, Barak, Barak, Al-Homs, Al- Tahuna, Muqatil Al-Dawla, Al-Manakh, Al-Manizla, and Al-Sultani, which was named after Sultan Al-Zahir Baybars, who donated it to Jerusalem, among other things. The history of Al-Turra goes back to ancient times, where the Ten Cities Tunnel appeared in the early Roman era, and this canal stretched from Al-Turra to Gadara through several areas. A group of Greek inscriptions and tombs have also been found in Turra. During the Mamluk period and the early Ottoman period, the city was an important postal point, where the Mamluk built a lighthouse for postal purposes and to guide travelers. They also donated agricultural lands of Al-Turra for charitable endowments and schools. The Mamluks built a lighthouse for postal purposes and to guide travelers, and they also endowed agricultural lands of Al-Turra for charitable endowments and schools.

The city is surrounded by the cities of Al-Ramtha and Al-Shajarah, and is very close and adjacent to Amrawah and al-Mughayyir, as well as bordering Tell Shihab and Daraa from the Syrian side. The city is located on a plateau with an average altitude of 478 meters above sea level. It is also characterized by its climate, which is part of the Mediterranean basin climate, but can fall under the influence of rather high temperatures at some times of the year. Like other areas of the Hauran Plain, it is characterized by its flat land and the fertility of its soil. Like other parts of Jordan, Al-Turra has a similar population in terms of customs, traditions, and origins; most of its inhabitants are of Arab tribal origin.

== Geography ==
The city belongs to the Al-Ramtha district of the Irbid governorate in northern Jordan, and Al-Turra is located between the Shumar Valley. To the west and south, and Syria's Wadi al-Madan, near the Syria-Jordan border, to the north and east. The city is located 8 kilometers north of Al-Ramtha and 35 kilometers northeast of Irbid. It is also 4 kilometers to the east, 4 kilometers from the nearest community of Al-Shajara, and 5 kilometers from the Syrian town of Tell Shihab. The city is connected by a network of roads with neighboring cities and towns, and it is mentioned that the first road in the area was built in 1960 AD, which is the road from Ramtha to Al-Shajara, passing through Al-Turra. The Al-Madan Bridge connecting the two banks of Wadi Al-Madan from Al-Turra and Tell Shihab was built in the nineteenth century but was soon destroyed due to neglect, as it was located on the new borders between the then-emerging states. Being located in the Houran Plain, Al-Turra, like other cities and towns in the Jordanian and Syrian parts of Houran, is characterized by a flat nature, and these flat areas are interspersed with a group of small hills, as Al-Turra itself rises on a hill that is considered higher than all the surrounding hills. Regionally, the city can be divided into three main districts: The Eastern District, the Western District, and the Southern District, and the Commercial Center can be added as a fourth major district. Recently, urbanization has begun to spread to the northern part of the city.

=== Climate ===
The climate in Al-Turra is generally mild, with a Mediterranean climate being the predominant type. Summer temperatures are high and reach their highest levels in the middle of the eighth month of the year, sometimes reaching the mid 30's Celsius. On occasion, temperatures have reached 40 degrees Celsius. In January, temperatures occasionally drop to zero or below, resulting in brief snowfalls that do not typically accumulate on the ground. The climate is characterized by mild temperatures during the spring and fall seasons. In some months, such as June, July, and August, precipitation levels are minimal, with rainfall rates reaching zero. The highest rates are observed in the months of December, January, and February.

== History ==
=== Name origin ===
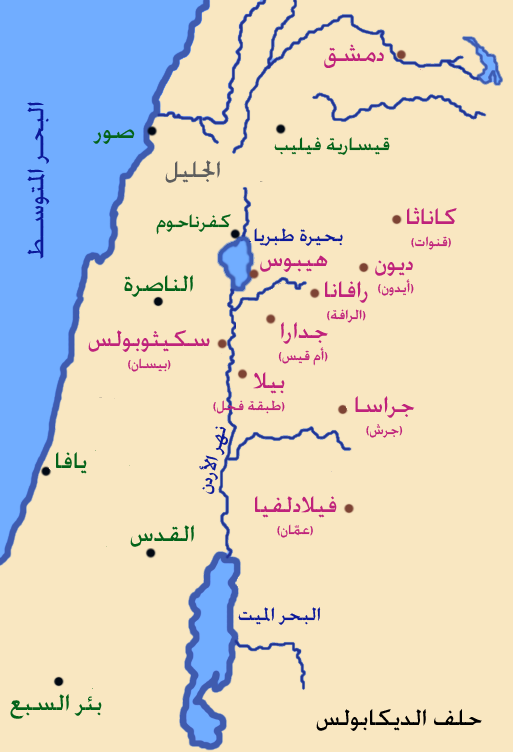
The cities of the Decapolis Alliance red colored.

In his work Mukhtar Al Sahah, the author provides an insight into the linguistic origin of the town's name. " The term "Al-Turra" is used to describe the cuff on the side of a garment that lacks fringe. In this context, it is defined as the edge of a river or valley. In Arabic, Al-Turra signifies that the border of any entity is its defining feature. The plural form is Torar. In addition, it signifies a corner."

In accordance with the available evidence, the appellation Al-Turra, by which the town is designated, is understood to signify, in Arabic lexicography, a limb, a corner, or a summit. Al-Turra was delineated by the Swiss traveler Johann Ludwig Burckhardt during his passage through the area, noting that it is situated on a series of low plateaus. This observation lends credence to the hypothesis that the name may have originated from a conceptualization of height and elevation. Additionally, Al-Turra signifies a corner, which is the front and top of an object. Al-Turra is situated in close proximity to Shumar Valley in the west, which has been incorporated into the town as a result of the significant urban expansion, as well as Al-Madan Valley in the east. Some local residents assert that the town's original name was Al-Durra, which was subsequently altered to Al-Turra during the Ottoman era. Others posit that the name was originally a Turkish designation, Altara, or alternatively, other names such as Al-Tamah. Nevertheless, there is no corroborating evidence to substantiate this claim, as these names are embedded within folk narratives pertaining to the pursuit of hidden treasures. Al-Turra was referenced by its present designation in a multitude of historical texts prior to the Ottoman era. No alternative appellations are documented, such as Sobh Al-Asha as referenced by Al-Qalqashandi, or the historical account of King Al-Zahir as detailed by Ibn Shaddad. In Mu'jam al-Buldān, Yaqut al-Hamawi references a village in Africa called Turra, noting that its name is derived from the Arabic word for the hem of a garment. A village with the same name, Turra, is also located in Yemen, within the Ibb Governorate.

=== Ancient era ===
Archaeological evidence from the Greek period and earlier has been uncovered in the town and its surrounding areas. This includes graves, monuments, and inscriptions that provide confirmation of the human settlement of Al-Turra during that era. Since the reign of Pompeius and the emergence of Decapolis in the first century B.C., Al-Turra has served as a pivotal hub for the conveyance of water through the 140-kilometer-long Decapolis Tunnel, colloquially designated as the "Pharaoh's Canal", in addition to the al-Turra-Umm Qais Tunnel. Al-Turra represents the principal gateway to the tunnel and constitutes the initial water collection point along its extensive route to Umm Qais, formerly known as Gadara. The Roman Emperor Hadrian initiated its construction in 130 AD, with the project spanning over 80 years and comprising numerous discontinuous phases. Al-Turra represents the convergence of the second and third phases of the tunnel. The initial phase extends from Dael to Daraa in the form of a shallow channel, while the second continues from Daraa with another shallow channel whose traces still remain east of the city of Al-Turra. The third stage extends from Al-Turra to Al-Shalalah Valley, and from this stage the tunnel begins its journey towards its ultimate destination, passing through several subsequent stages. It is of interest to note that Al-Turra was part of the Arabian Roman province of Petraea. During the Byzantine era, the city became integrated into the second province of Palestine.

=== Islamic era ===
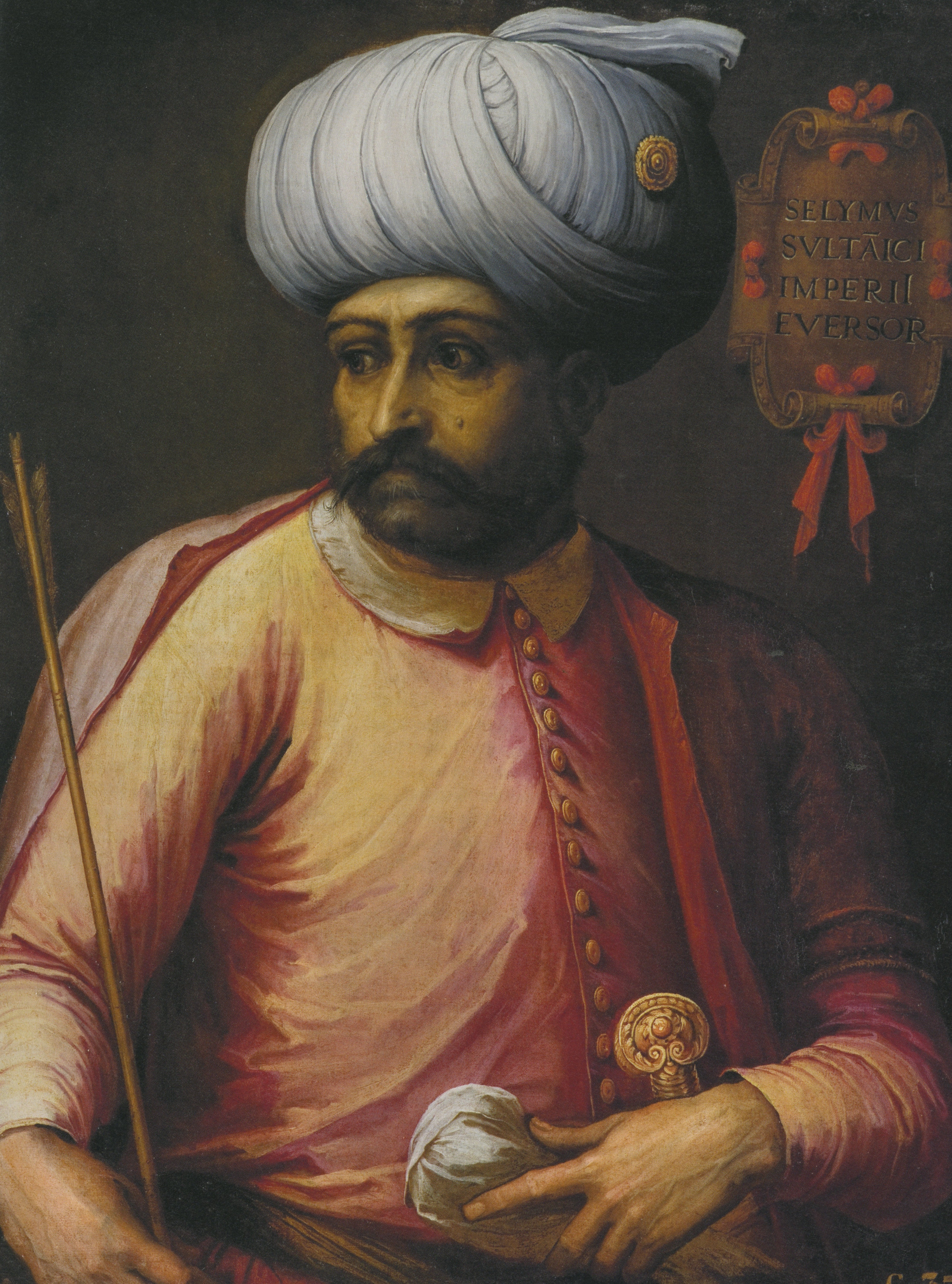
Sultan Salim I. During his reign, the Levant came into the possession of the Ottoman Empire.

Following the Battle of Yarmuk, the region entered a new phase, becoming an integral part of the Rashidun Caliphate. During the Rashidun era, Al-Turra was under the control of Jund al-Urdunn, which also exercised authority over the majority of Houran. It is documented that Umar ibn al-Khattab traversed Al-Turra on his expedition to Damascus, where he conducted a prayer in the Umari Mosque, which was subsequently named in his honor. During the Mamluk period, the city served as a significant hub for the transportation of mail, and a lighthouse was constructed and utilized as a navigational aid for travelers. Additionally, Al-Turra played a significant role in the establishment of endowments in both Jerusalem and select educational institutions, including the Zahiriyya School in Damascus. The inscription above the school's gate, inscribed in the Thuluth or Naskh Mamluk script, reads as follows: "In the name of Allah, the Merciful, the Compassionate. The endowment of this land and the two schools and the house of Hadith in the village of Al-Turra, and their amount is eleven shares and one-eighth of a share out of twenty-four shares."

In the seventh century AH, the Levantine pilgrimage route, known in Al-Turra as Darb al-Hajj or Darb al-Hajj Road, underwent a modification whereby it was rerouted to pass through Al-Turra from the east, with scheduled stops at Damascus, Al-Sanamayn, and Al-Muzayrib. The caravan's camels would disembark east of Al-Turra at a location designated as Al-Manakh, as the camels would be seated there.

==== Ottoman era ====
In 1516, the Ottoman Empire, under the leadership of Sultan Selim I, emerged victorious in the Battle of Marj Dabiq against the Mamluk Sultanate. This marked the beginning of four centuries of Ottoman domination over the Levant, which would persist until 1916. At the advent of the Ottoman era, the town was one of the most populous settlements in Transjordan, ranking only behind the cities of Ajloun and Al-Karak in terms of population.

In 1596 it appeared in the Ottoman tax registers under the name of Turra, being part of the nahiya of Butayna in the Qadaa Hauran. It had an entirely Muslim population consisting of 98 households and 40 bachelors. They paid a fixed tax-rate of 40% on agricultural products, including wheat (13400 a.), barley (4050 a.), summer crops (1550 a.), goats and bee-hives (250 a.), in addition to "occasional revenues" (300 a.); a total of 19,550 akçe. Half of the revenue went to a waqf.

In 1816, the English traveler James Silk Buckingham passed near Al-Turra during his journey in the Levant. He noted that the population of the town was approximately 300 inhabitants, all Muslims, and that it was situated on the pilgrimage route from Damascus to Mecca.

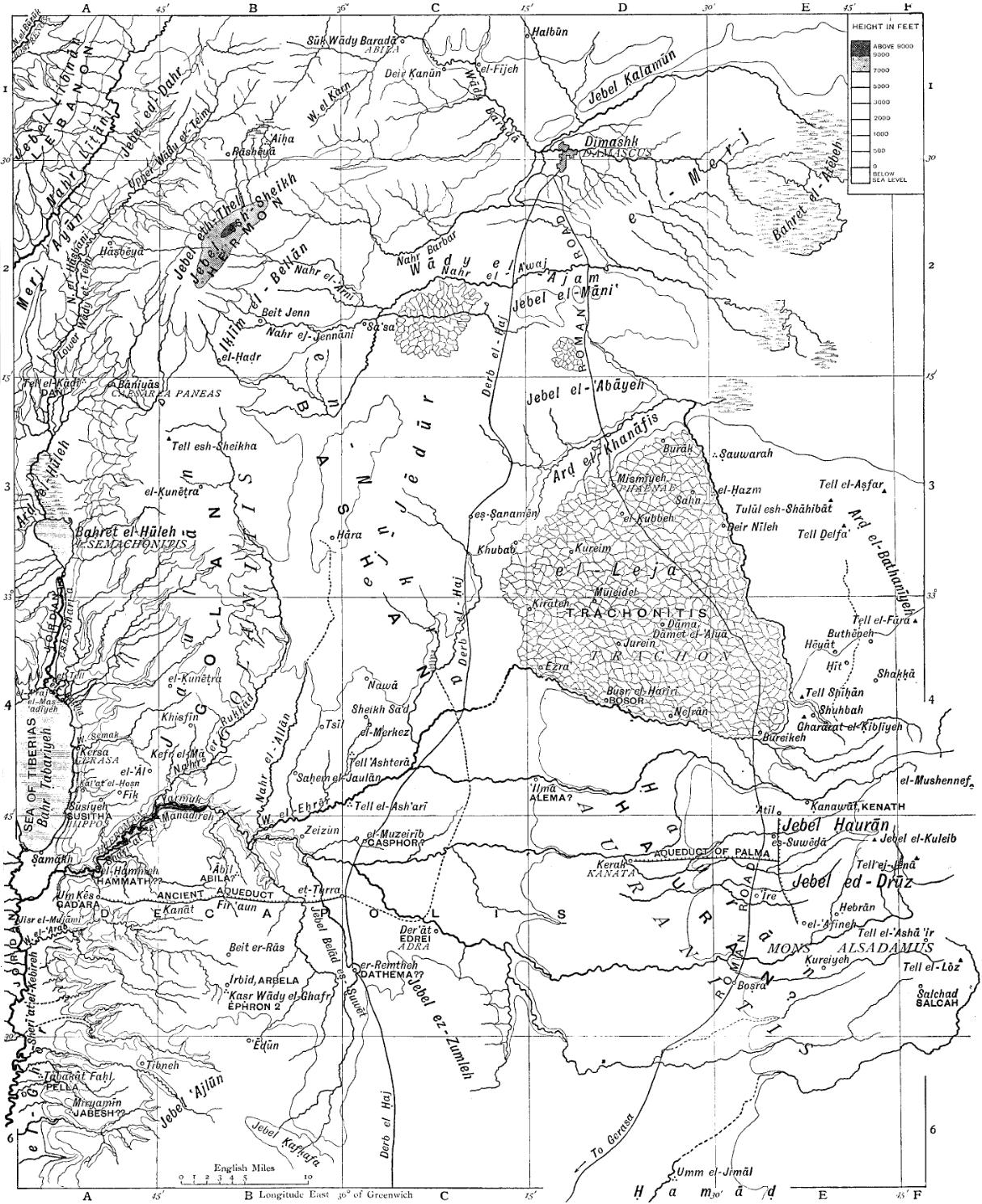
Al-Turra on the Levantine pilgrimage route, known as the "Pilgrim's Way", as the tunnel of the ten cities appears on the map. (Map published in 1903 AD)

In 1838 Eli Smith noted that the place was located west of the Hajj road, and that it was in ruins. During this period, a number of families relocated from Al-Turra, with the Hashish clan, who were Shammarites, being the last to do so. The Hashish clan has been present in Houran since the clan's grandfather, Sahn, arrived from Tell Shihab in 1700/1701 and remained until 1711. Sahn's grandson Shihab subsequently departed from the Tell Shihab area, which was subsequently named after him. This land was subsequently transferred to the Darabsa Shammari clan following an agreement reached at Tell Shihab Haraba. (Note: The Haraba of Tell Shihab, a dispute between the Hashish clan and the Darabsa clan over the ownership of Al-Turra land, began in 1857 and continued for eight years afterward. The chaos that prevailed in the region following the withdrawal of the forces of Muhammad Ali Pasha's campaign in the Levant had the most prominent impact on such events.) The modern housing in Al-Turra commenced and persists to the present day, as evidenced by the genealogical tree of the branches of the Darabsa clan, which was documented and sealed in 1886. This is where an agreement was reached between the Darabsa Shammarite clans. The families of Barakat, Samara, Al Hajji, Irshid, and Saleh Al Jawda. (Note: The five Darabsa clans meet in one grandfather, Tu'ma ibn Thamir ibn Amud; he had two sons, Hasan and Samara; Hasan gave birth to Barakat, Irshid, Mubarak, and Mar'i, where Barakat is the grandfather of the Barakat and Irshid is the grandfather of the Rashidat, while Mubarak and Mar'i are included in the Barakat clan. On the other hand, Samara had three sons, Abdul Qadir, Mustafa, and Muhammad. Abdul Qadir is the grandfather of Al-Saleh, Al-Jawda, and Al-Zawahira, Mustafa is the grandfather of Al-Hajiya, while Muhammad is the grandfather of Samarat, and he retained his father's name, which was given to his descendants after him.) Following their departure from Ha'il and subsequent sojourn in Tafilah, the Hashish Shammarite clan resident in Tell Shihab bestowed upon Al-Turra a tract of land in exchange for the Darabsa's pledge of abstinence from cohabitation with Zaabi and Christians. This agreement, which continues to be observed to this day, was reached in the context of the Hashish Shammarite clan's long-standing animosity towards Zaabi and Christians. It is notable that the Swiss traveler John Louis Burckhardt traversed Al-Turra during his journey from Damascus to Hejaz in 1812 AD. He observed that it is situated on a low series of plateaus that form a circle with the road passing through its center. He also noted the fertility of its pastures and suggested that this was a contributing factor to its designation as a refuge for the Bedouins. Prior to the era of Darabsa, Al-Turra was a significant supplier of Shamite camels, which were used to transport pilgrims to Hejaz. The name of the local sheik, Shihab al-Din bin Hamad al-Hatamal, is referenced in Damascus legal documents among the sheiks of Hauran who supplied the Shamite camels in 1795. Its school is one of the oldest educational establishments in the Kingdom of Jordan. It was founded at the inception of the Emirate of Transjordan and officially inaugurated in 1927. During his reign, Al-Zahir Baybars established a charitable khan in Jerusalem. He endowed it with a charitable endowment from the lands of Al-Turra, which included a lighthouse to guide caravans passing through it and a postal service. During the Mamluk and Ottoman periods, a significant amount of land was allocated from the Al-Turra region to establish educational institutions. A number of indications suggest that the area was inhabited for several centuries prior to the advent of the Common Era. This is corroborated by the discovery of ancient ruins. At the advent of the Ottoman era in the Levant region, in the 10th century AH/16th century AD, Al-Turra constituted part of the Bani Jahmah district, which was itself part of the Hauran district. The Banu Jahmah district, which extended from Jumha in the west to Bosra al-Sham in the east, constituted part of the Sanjak (brigade) of al-Sham at the time. The district of Horan was also included within this administrative division. This state of affairs represents an extension of the socio-political configuration that prevailed in Al-Turra during the Mamluk era. In the early 19th century, Al-Turra became part of the Al-Suwayt district, while the eastern part of Al-Batin district, previously known as Bani Jahmah district, became an independent district within the Hauran region.

Following the defeat of the Arab Kingdom of Syria, which had ruled the Levant following the Ottoman retreat, by French forces at the Battle of Maysalun, local governments were established in Jordan. One of these was the Al-Ramtha local government, of which Al-Turra was one of the districts. At the time, Al-Turra constituted one of its districts. Since the establishment of the Emirate, Al-Turra has gradually become one of the largest non-centralized areas in Jordan, such as Beit Ras, Al-Serih, and others. Al-Turra has experienced a significant urban renaissance and the expansion of agricultural land development to match the population, which has reached thirty-five thousand inhabitants. The town also serves as the administrative center of the Hauran Plain municipality, which has a population of over 80,000.

== Population ==
The presence of humans in Al-Turra can be traced back to several centuries before the Common Era. The discovery of scattered Greek tombs and some Roman ruins provides evidence of this. The town has been the site of numerous civilizations, with the most significant being the Roman and Greek periods. Following the Battle of Yarmuk, human settlement continued until the end of the sixteenth century. At the beginning of the Ottoman era, it was the third largest district in Transjordan, after Ajloun and Al-Karak. The decline in population observed after the sixteenth century was the result of a number of factors, including raids and inter-tribal disputes, as well as a series of years of drought. It was inhabited by the Baqirat clan, followed by the Hashish clan, and then the Darabsa clan, which until 1857 was the only clan in Al-Turra. Following a dispute between the Darabsa and Hashish clans over the ownership of Al-Turra land in what is known as the Tell Shihab Haraba, the Darabsa clan formed an alliance with the Hijazi and Ramadan clans to confront the opposing party. These three clans were the first of the modern Al-Turra clans to settle in 1865.

=== Demographics ===
Al-Turra is one of the most populous areas in northern Jordan and Irbid Governorate in particular, with a population larger than that of the cities of Al-Karak, Tafilah, and Ajloun. To illustrate, consider the following example. By the conclusion of 2017, the municipal population was estimated to be approximately 35,000 individuals, all of whom adhered to the Islamic faith and identified as Arabs. The Al-Turra community is currently homogeneous in terms of religious, ethnic, and cultural identity. All residents are Arab Muslims from tribal or clan backgrounds. This homogeneity is evidenced by the similar customs observed among the townspeople and the intermarriage between different clans and families.

In addition to the Darabsa clan.(Al Barakat, Al Samarat, Al Saleh Al Jawdah, Al Rashidat, Al Hajiya) The Al Hijazi clan and the Al Ramadan clan. The city is inhabited by a number of other clans and families, including al-Janaida, al-Hayek, Qarbaa, al-Sukhni, al-Qur, al-Khatib, al-Masri, al-Hanawi, al-Shiab, al-Qanah, Abu Nassar, Abu Hamoud, al-Barghouti, al-Kabha, Shihab, Nafeh, al-Hamarna, families from the Bani Malham clan, families from Bani Khaled, families from the Anza tribe, and other families and clans. In addition to the numerous Arab nationalities, including Egyptians, Iraqis, and Syrians, there are also a number of Shiite families residing in Al-Turra. Additionally, a Shiite family from Bint Jbeil, Lebanon, known as the Mutawala.

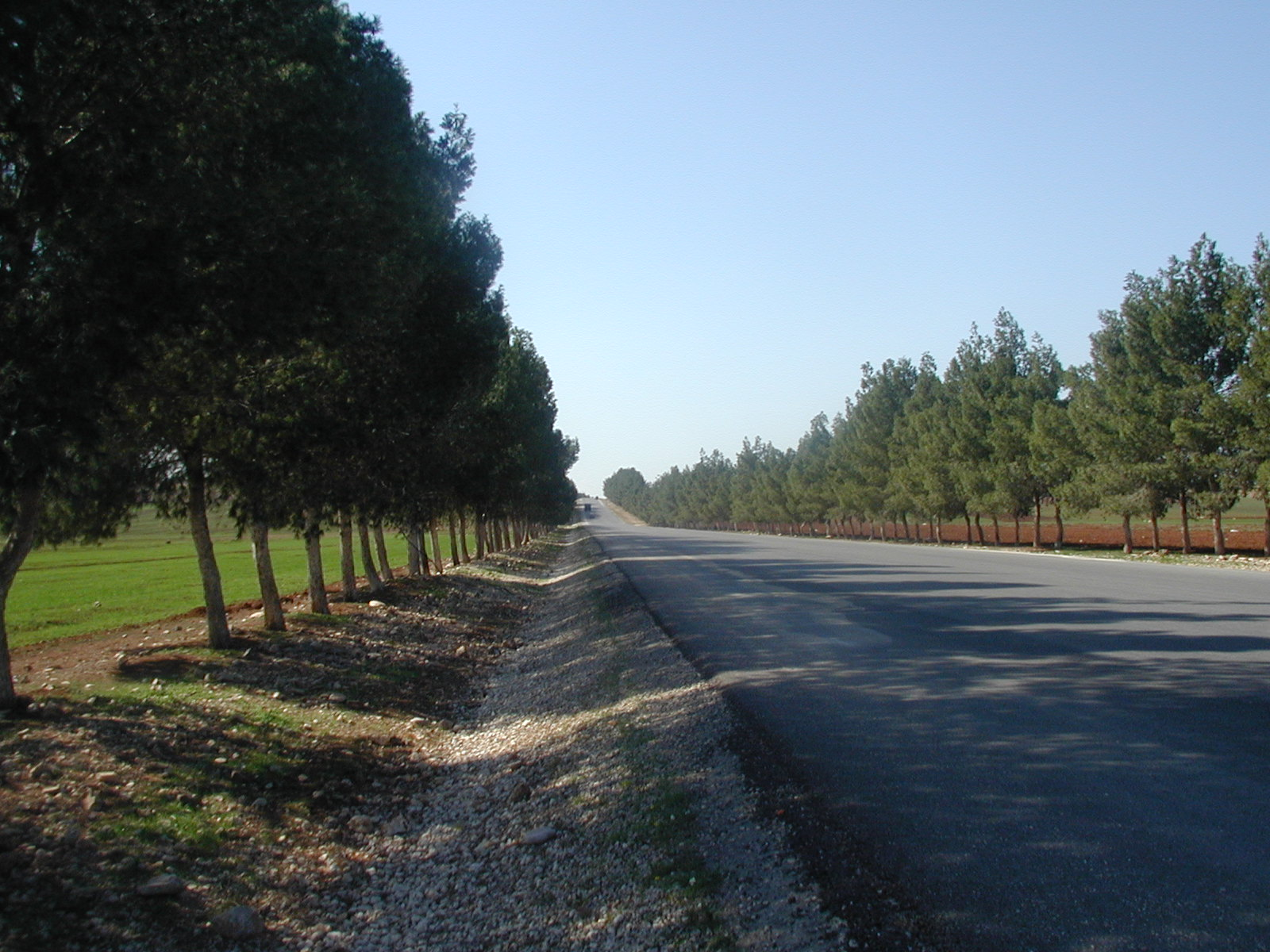
The Al-Turra-Shajara road, was first paved in 1960.

== Transportation and communications ==
Al-Turra's transportation infrastructure is primarily reliant on road transportation for the movement of people and goods to and from the town. It is also noteworthy that the residents of the town collectively own a fleet of trucks, in addition to a number of privately owned vehicles that are used for travel between Jordan and neighboring countries, including Iraq, Syria, Lebanon, and Saudi Arabia. However, the efficacy of these vehicles diminished in the wake of conflicts in neighboring countries. The Medan Bridge, which connects the two banks of the Medan Valley, was constructed during the second half of the 19th century during the Ottoman Empire's rule. The inaugural paved road in the town was the main thoroughfare that connected Al-Turra to its neighboring communities. Al-Ramtha and Al-Shajarah, which were ready for service in 1960, were the first locations to receive paved roads, with construction commencing in 1951. In terms of the field of telecommunications, Al-Turra, like the rest of Jordan, fell under the purview of the Ministry of Communications and Information Technology (MCIT). This entity was responsible for the provision of a range of telecommunications services, including landlines. Furthermore, it was the sole provider of Internet services at the outset of its operations in Jordan.

Zain, Orange, and Umniah—all private companies—now provide telecommunications and internet services in all their forms. Orange, in addition to other services, offers landline phone services. The work of these entities is overseen by the Ministry of Telecommunications and the relevant authorities. (Note: Zain and Orange were known as Fastlink and Mobilecom before they merged into Zain and Orange.)

== Mosques ==
Consequently, mosques play a pivotal role in the architectural landscape of the city, particularly given that Islam is the official religion of the Hashemite Kingdom of Jordan, as stipulated in the Jordanian Constitution, which was enacted in 1952. The architectural styles of these mosques exhibited considerable diversity, reflecting the influence of various architectural schools. The number of mosques in Jordan grew considerably during this period, with Al-Turra becoming home to ten large mosques by 1303 AH. These mosques represent some of the largest in the Irbid Governorate.

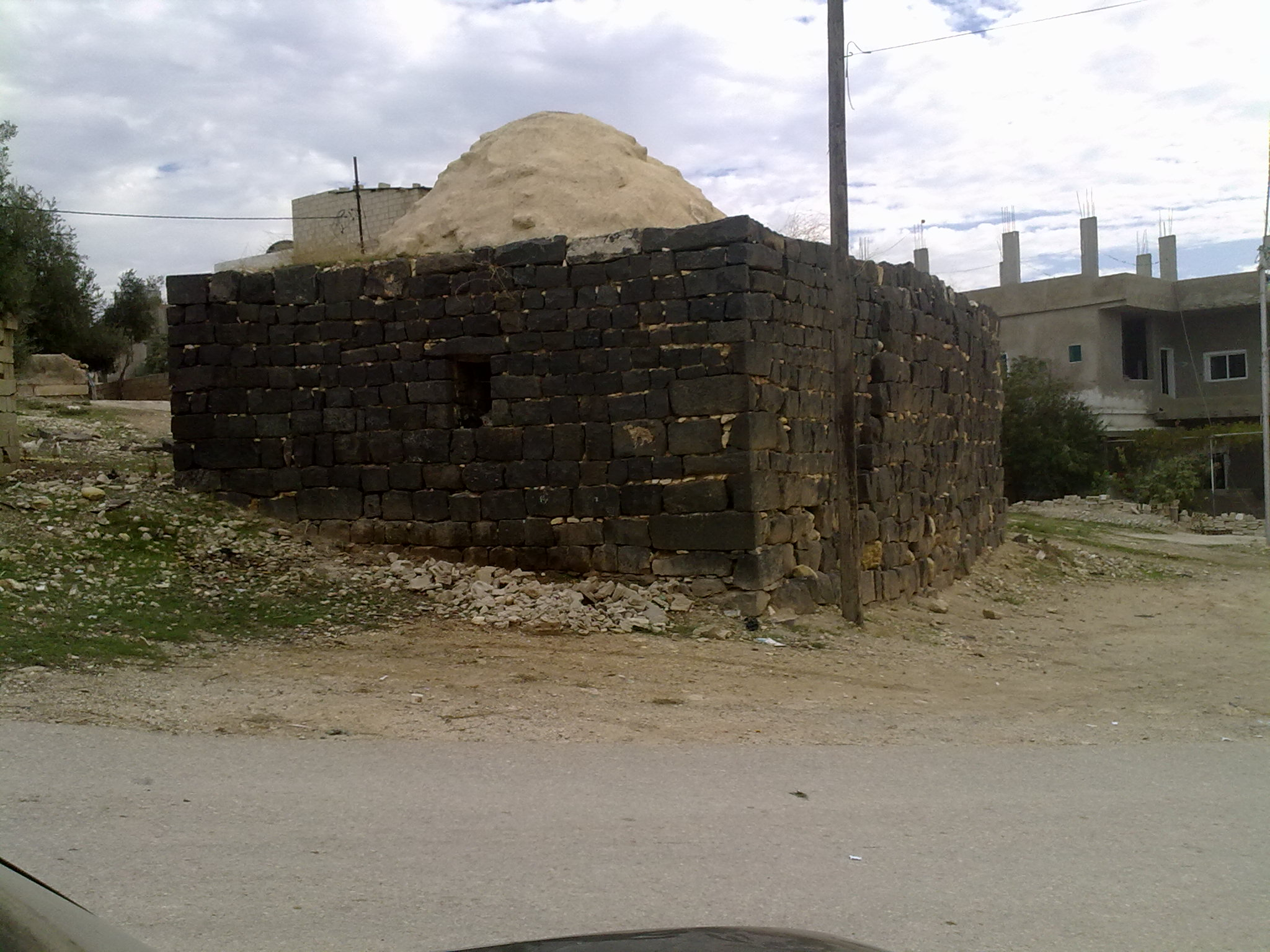
Sheikh Khalil Archaeological Mosque.

The architectural styles of the Mamluk and Umayyad periods played a significant role in the design of mosques in Al-Turra and other locations in Jordan. This is due to Jordan's geographical location, which encompasses the Arabian Peninsula, Iraq, the Levant, and Egypt. These regions share a cultural and architectural heritage that is inextricably linked to their origins. It is of interest to note that the Omari Mosque was the first mosque in Al-Turra. Rebuilt in 1303 AH, shortly after the construction of modern housing in the town, it was the sole mosque until the establishment of Sharhbil ibn Hasna Mosque in 1964. There are a number of mosques in the town that date back to the Islamic conquest:

- The Omari Mosque, also known as the Umar Ibn Al-Khattab Mosque, is situated in the center of Al-Turrah. It is believed that it was constructed subsequent to the Islamic conquest during the reign of Umar Ibn Al-Khattab, and subsequently renovated in 1303 AH, marking the advent of modern housing in the town. In 2005, the mosque was demolished, and a group of shops was subsequently constructed on the site. In 2017, a small mosque bearing the same name was built. It is said that the structure once contained a stone on which the names of the Al-Turra clans that founded the modern-day Al-Turra were engraved.
- The Sheikh Khalil Mosque, situated to the west of the Omari Mosque, is believed to have been constructed prior to 1250 AH. It is said that the mosque contains the tomb of Sheikh Khalil al-Rifai, who is named after him. Sheikh Khalil is a Sufi mystic from the village of Umm Weld who was buried in that mosque.
- The Shurahbil ibn Hasana Mosque, constructed in 1964, is the oldest mosque still in use today, with some modern expansions. The mosque is situated on the highest point in the town, which is the plateau on which modern Tura has been constructed since the mid-19th century. As a result, the minaret of the mosque is the tallest building in Al-Turra visible to those approaching from any direction. This mosque and its location are considered the nucleus around which Al-Turra was formed, a phenomenon observed in all Islamic cities, where the building is formed around the mosque.
- The Moaz bin Jabal Mosque is one of the largest mosques in Irbid Governorate. The mosque is colloquially known as the "Municipality Mosque" due to its proximity to the Hauran Plain Central Municipality building on the main thoroughfare that connects Al-Turra to Al-Ramtha on one side and Al-Turra to Al-Shajarah on the other. The mosque and Sharhabeel Mosque are the two most significant mosques in Al-Turra.
- The Abu Dujana Mosque is situated at the Finjan Roundabout, approximately one and a half kilometers north of the main entrance to Tura.
- The Hudhayfah ibn al-Yaman Mosque is situated to the east of the Al-Omari Mosque, in close proximity to the Social Development Center.
- The Al-Anfal Mosque is situated in the northern Bariq neighborhood.
- The Uqba ibn Nafi Mosque is situated in Sultani.
- The Muawiya ibn Abi Sufyan Mosque is situated in the town's most recently developed residential area, the Eastern Neighborhood.
- The Qaba' Mosque is situated at the principal entrance to the town, in the direction of Al-Ramtha.
- The Al-Mustafa Mosque is situated in the western section of the town, to the north of the bridge that connects the two ends of the road leading to the town of Al-Shajara.

== The culture ==
The town's culture is part of the broader cultural landscape of the Hauran Plain. In the past, the town's mudafis or dawawin served as cultural forums where public affairs were discussed, poetry was recited, and the rebab was played, among other activities. Conversely, folk dances, the most significant of which is the Jawfiya, are regarded as a representative emblem of Hauran as a whole. However, they exhibit regional variations in terms of the poems sung and certain aspects of the performance. The dance is performed by two rows of men who meet in a manner similar to that of the Dahiya dance. The men clasp their hands together and then one of the men recites poetic verses in a lyrical manner, which the men then repeat. This gives the attendees a sense of enthusiasm.

Conversely, the Hauran Dabke represents a significant aspect of the cultural heritage of the Hauran Plain, particularly in the context of Al-Turra. It is regarded as a distinctive and distinctive folkloric heritage in the region. In terms of poetry, it held a significant position in the affections of the town's inhabitants, both men and women, who frequently recited verses of Nabati poetry in their daily lives, particularly women. Additionally, older women are accustomed to chanting with their voices what is referred to as "hijini," which is distinct from the conventional hijini, which is analogous to singing with a daha. It is merely a method of reciting verses of poetry, and these women engage in this practice to entertain themselves when they are alone or with other women. This is due to the nature of the population, their ancient Bedouin origins, the nature of their settlement, and the influence of the environment on them as well. They have always considered themselves owners of a culture that blends nomadism and agriculture. Their nature blends the arrogance of the Bedouin and the discipline of the farmer with the same personality.

=== Cuisine ===
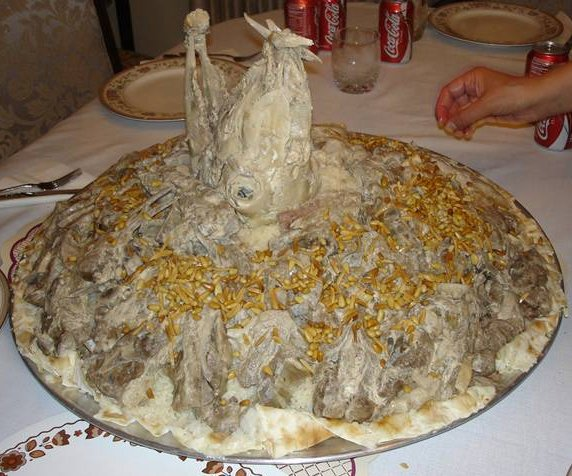
Mansaf, the national dish of Jordan and the Hauran Plain.

Al-Turrawi cuisine is distinguished by its incorporation of the hallmarks of Jordanian and Hauran cuisines. Mansaf is regarded as the epitome of this culinary tradition, with its preparation observed across Jordan and the Hauran, encompassing both Syrian and Jordanian influences. A significant number of researchers have posited that Mansaf, which comprises jameed or yogurt, meat, rice or bulgur, represents the general culture of the region. This is because it blends the lifestyles of the Bedouin and the farmer, which reflects the nature of life among the people of the region in general. The nomadic origins of most tribes, coupled with the agricultural life they later adopted, represents a great cultural heritage for them. Another dish is the Hauran or Ramthawi kebab, which is characterized as the signature dish of the municipal area of the Hauran Plain and the city of Al-Ramtha. Other notable dishes include maqta'a, ka'akil, hefet, and azan shayeb, which is considered a non-Hawranian dish in origin.

=== Clothing ===
Since the 1990s, there has been a notable shift in the dress habits observed in Al-Turra. The traditional Arab dress, comprising the keffiyeh, the agal, the thobe, and the Arabic cloak, is the traditional dress in Al-Turra. Elements specific to the people of the Hauran region and Jordan can also be observed, particularly in the dress of the elderly. The traditional dress of women in the region is more varied and opulent than that of men. The German Bashkir, Champer, and Black dresses are the most common traditional garments worn by women in Al-Turra and the surrounding Al-Ramtha Brigade area.

=== Monuments and leisure ===
The archaeological monuments in Al-Turra are relatively few in number and are distributed in a scattered manner. The majority of these monuments are Islamic in nature, including the Sheikh Khalil Mosque and the Omari Mosque, which was demolished. In addition to the Mamluk lighthouse site and a number of heritage houses and guesthouses that contain unique drawings and inscriptions, the area also boasts a number of other historical sites. It is notable that the majority of these locations are situated on private rather than public property. Additionally, there are Roman ruins, such as the Decapolis aqueduct situated to the east of Al-Turra, as well as the tunnel itself, which commences in Al-Turra and terminates in Umm Qais.

In terms of leisure activities, the city's demographics and cultural background result in a limited number of recreational venues, with the most prominent being the natural areas surrounding the town. These areas play a particularly significant role during the spring season. In addition, the cafes have assumed the role of the mudawiyat (dawwain) among the town's inhabitants, with the mudawiyat now serving only as a social institution, due to the profound changes in the nature of the population's life between the past and the present. Furthermore, the Hauran Plain Park is situated to the west of Al-Turra and is primarily intended for the leisure of children.

== Economy ==
The market of Al-Turra is relatively small, providing residents with their grocery and other necessary items. In the past, this market consisted merely of five or fewer grocery stores. The residents of Al-Turra rely on various sources of income, including employment, trade, travel, and agriculture. These sources of income have become less dependent on the population than they once were.

=== Agriculture ===
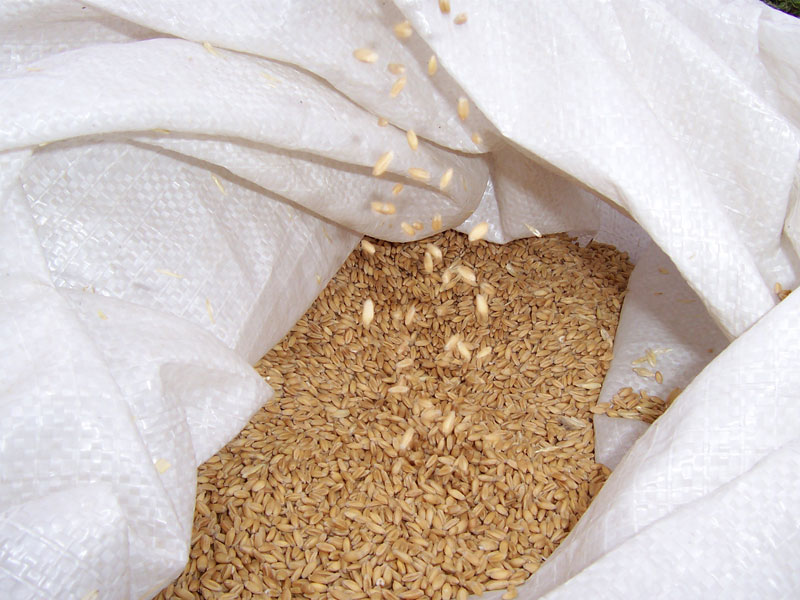
Wheat is one of the most prominent agricultural products in Al-Turra.

The town's agricultural history is inextricably linked to that of the Hauran Plain. Indeed, the Romans were so reliant on the plain for wheat crops that they named the area Ehra' Rome. Additionally, the region is renowned for its summer crops, including watermelon, cantaloupe, okra, pumpkin, and other varieties. These crops are cultivated in what is locally referred to as suhari. Despite the richness and quality of the soil in Al-Turra, the land was reserved for non-permanent crops such as cereals and summer crops for a very long time. This may have been due to the necessity of providing pasture for the sheep and goats of Al-Turra. The introduction of permanent trees would have impeded this process, but this changed in the latter part of the 20th century. The planting of permanent trees commenced gradually, although they remained exclusively olive trees with a few exceptions, such as grape, fig, and pomegranate trees.

== Education and health care ==
The history of educational institutions in the town commences with the establishment of the Emirate of Transjordan. At that time, Al-Turra Primary School for Boys was established, as education had previously been based solely on kuttabs. The schools were:

- Al-Turra Comprehensive Secondary School for Boys represents an extension of the original primary school. The institution was established at the inception of the Emirate of Transjordan and formally inaugurated in 1927, thus establishing itself as one of the most venerable and esteemed educational establishments in Jordan. The school commenced operations with grades one through four, and the current Yarmouk Basic School for Girls building served as its inaugural headquarters.
- Al-Turra Model Private School is a private educational institution.
- Al-Turra Comprehensive Secondary School for Girls.
- Halima Al Saadia Co-educational Secondary School (coeducational in the first three grades).
- Khalid ibn al-Walid Primary School.
- Maysalun Co-educational Basic School is coeducational in the first three grades.
- Amina bint Wahb Primary School for Girls.
- Jafar Al-Tayyar Basic School for Boys.
- Muadh ibn Jabal Basic School for Boys.
- Yarmouk Basic School for Girls.
- Arwa bint Abd al-Muttalib Co-educational Primary School is a coeducational institution, with the exception of the first three grades.

Furthermore, the town boasts Quranic centers that are affiliated with the Ministry of Endowments and the Society for the Preservation of the Quran. These centers are either permanent or operate as summer centers, with the objective of memorizing the Quran and teaching other Islamic sciences. Two notable examples are the Ammar bin Yasser Center of the Association for the Preservation of the Quran and the Al-Nu'man ibn Muqrin Center of the Salihin Association for the Memorization of the Quran. Both have produced numerous male and female Quran memorizers. A number of mosques in the town also function as summer centers for memorizing the Quran under the auspices of the Ministry of Religious Endowments during the summer vacation period for school students. Furthermore, the municipality boasts a multitude of kindergartens catering to children between the ages of four and six. Kindergartens are not compulsory, unlike schools, and they precede the age of six years or the beginning of the school stage in the first grade.

In terms of health, the town has three health centers: the Northern Al-Turra Health Center, the Southern Tura Health Center, and the Comprehensive Hauran Plain Health Center. The latter is located west of Al-Turra at the border of the village of al-Shajara. Additionally, a number of private pharmacies are also available in Al-Turra.

== Sports ==
Al-Tura SC was established in 1979 and is currently one of the Jordanian First Division football clubs. It achieved promotion the Jordan Professional League in 1998, participating in the 1999 season. Additionally, the team advanced to the semi-finals of the Jordan FA Cup, maintaining its status as the sole club in the town until 2017, when Shabab Hauran SC was established. In the town, as in the rest of Jordan and the majority of the Arab world, football is the most popular sport. From time to time, popular teams and neighborhood teams are formed and engage in competitions with one another. These competitions may occur with some regularity.

Conversely, individual combat sports such as taekwondo, kickboxing, and others are highly popular among the town's residents. These sports have been successfully promoted by clubs, which have attracted a significant number of players, particularly children and teenagers. The number of individuals joining these clubs tends to increase during the summer vacation period, and a number of players from these clubs have been successful in winning a number of local tournaments. The Hauran Plain Municipality owns a municipal stadium in Al-Turra, called the Al-Turra Municipal Stadium. This stadium serves as a training ground for the Al-Tura SC. In 2012, the stadium underwent a renovation that transformed it from a dirt floor to an artificial turf surface. This modification made the facility suitable for the club's sports training, thereby saving time, money, and effort for the players and the team management in general.

== See also ==
- Hauran

== Bibliography ==
- Hütteroth, W.-D.; Abdulfattah, K. (1977). Historical Geography of Palestine, Transjordan and Southern Syria in the Late 16th Century. Erlanger Geographische Arbeiten, Sonderband 5. Erlangen, Germany: Vorstand der Fränkischen Geographischen Gesellschaft. ISBN 3-920405-41-2.
- Robinson, E.; Smith, E. (1841). Biblical Researches in Palestine, Mount Sinai and Arabia Petraea: A Journal of Travels in the year 1838. Vol. 3. Boston: Crocker & Brewster.
- Sobh Al-Asha, Al-Qalqashandi, Amiriya Press, Cairo - 1919
- History of King Al-Zahir, Ibn Shaddad, care of Ahmad Hattit, Franzstaiz - 1983
- Studies in the Social Archaeology of Villages in Irbid Governorate: (Bushra, Sal, Hawara, Tura), Zaidoun Muhaisen, Jordanian Ministry of Culture - 2007
- Jordanian Al-Hilal Magazine, No. 117
- The Land of Gilead and Travels in Lebanon, Syria, Jordan and Palestine (1880 AD), Lawrence Oliphant, translated by Ahmad Oweidi al-Abadi, 2004
- Jordanian Clans Between Past and Present, Nassim Muhammad al-Akash
- In the Shores of Jordan: Tours and Sightings, Ahmed Ouidi al-Abadi, Dar al-Fikr, 1987
- History of the City of Ramtha and its Brigade, Farouk Sarihin
- Dictionary of Jordanian Clans, Abdul Raouf Al-Rawabdeh
- The Documented Genealogy: (a series dealing with the tribes of Shammar and Anza), Abu Abd al-Hadi Arak al-Farisi al-Jarba, Aladdin House for Printing, Publishing and Distribution, 2006
- Irbid the city: History, Civilization and Antiquities, Mohammed Ali al-Suwairki, Greater Amman Municipality, 2006
- Civilizational History of Transjordan in the Mamluk Era, Youssef Darwish Ghawanmeh, Dar al-Fikr for Publishing and Distribution/Amman, Second Edition, 1982
- Islamic Endowments in Palestine in the Mamluk Era, Muhammad Othman al-Khatib, Dar al-Kitab al-Thaqafiya
- Encyclopedia of Irbid Governorate: (literary, historical, geographical, archaeological, archaeological, tribal, and statistical studies), Sultan Tarekhem al-Dhahn al-Sarhani, 2004
- The Levantine Pilgrimage Caravan and its Importance in the Ottoman Era, Abd al-Karim Rafiq
- Jami al-Durr al-Bahiya in the Genealogy of the Qurayshis in the Levant, Kamal al-Hout al-Husseini
- The Dictionary of Clans in Jordan and Palestine, Hanna Amari
- Villages and Genealogies of Hauran, Hisham Abdel Aziz, 1996
- Mukhtar al-Sahih, Imam Muhammad ibn Abi Bakr al-Razi
- Islamic Endowments in Palestine and their Role in Confronting the Israeli Occupation, Sami Muhammad Salahat
- Dictionary of the Names of Cities and Villages in the Southern Levant (A linguistic-historical-archaeological study on the names of ancient cities, villages and hills in the southern Levant, with the latest statistics, ancient and modern), Mounir Theeb, Dar Al-Arab for Studies, Publishing and Translation - 2010
