= Spillover of the Syrian civil war =

- Part of the Syrian civil war (continued conflict), Arab Winter, spillover of the Iraqi civil war, Islamic State conflict, and the war on terror
- Map of the military situation in Syria, Iraq, and Lebanon, as of February 2026. For the current military situation, click on one of the following links to a map template without shaded areas: here for Syria, here for Iraq, here for Lebanon, and here for all three in one map.
Date	17 June 2011 – present (15 years, 4 months and 4 weeks)
Location	Border states: Turkey, Iraq, Lebanon, Jordan, and Israeli-occupied Golan Heights; Outside of Syria: Egypt, Libya, Yemen, Kuwait, Bangladesh, the Philippines, Algeria, Pakistan, Southeast Asia, Southern and Central Africa and Europe (see Islamic terrorism in Europe)
Result	Ongoing: War in Iraq ended in 2017; Syrian civil war spillover in Lebanon ended in 2017; Hezbollah involvement in the Syrian civil war ended in 2024; Hezbollah–Syria clashes is ongoing; Syrian–Turkish border clashes during the Syrian civil war ended in 2022; Turkish involvement in the Syrian civil war and conflict ended in 2026; Jordanian–Syrian border incidents during the Syrian civil war ended in 2018; Israeli–Syrian ceasefire line incidents during the Syrian civil war is ongoing

Following the outbreak of the protests of the Syrian revolution during the Arab Spring in 2011 and the escalation of the ensuing conflict into a full-scale civil war by mid-2012, the Syrian Civil War became a theatre of proxy warfare between various regional powers such as Turkey and Iran. Spillover of the Syrian civil war into the wider region began when the Iraqi insurgent group known as the Islamic State of Iraq (ISI) started intervening in the conflict in 2012.

In 2012, ISI began transporting its fighters, arms and supplies to Syria. In April 2013, ISI renamed itself as the "Islamic State of Iraq and Levant" (ISIL), officially announcing its expansion into Syria. Throughout 2013, ISIL fought Syrian opposition groups, gaining control of numerous hamlets, villages, towns and cities in eastern and northern Syria. In late 2013, ISIL launched its Anbar campaign into regions of Western Iraq and captured Fallujah in January 2014. In June 2014, ISIL captured vaste swathes of territory during its Northern Iraq offensive, culminating in the capture of Mosul. On 29 June 2014, the group renamed itself as the "Islamic State" (IS) and declared itself as a Caliphate.

== Iraq ==
=== Iraqi–Syrian border incidents ===
The Akashat ambush was a well planned assault against a Syrian Army convoy defended by Iraqi soldiers that took place on 4 March 2013, as the group was travelling in the province of Anbar, next to the border with Syria. The Islamic State of Iraq claimed responsibility for the ambush on 11 March. 51 Syrian soldiers were killed in the clashes.

In March 2013, a source from Sinjar hospital said that Free Syrian Army attacked Iraqi soldiers after entering Iraqi territories. This led to greater fighting throughout the country, Operation al-Shabah in May 2013 in which the Iraqi Army failed to wipe these militias out and the consolidation of several of them with ISIL. Armed conflict broke out in Al Anbar Governorate in late 2013 and by January 2014, Islamic State had mutated and grown into a massive pseudo country which has taken over much of Iraq and Syria and erased the border between the two countries in a new, multinational war. In June 2014, ISIL launched an offensive in northern Iraq taking large swaths of the country and threatening Baghdad itself, thus turning the conflict into a full-scale war that lasted until 2017.

In June 2016, the Syrian Free Army, backed by the United States, overtook ISIL forces in the border town of al-Bukamal. The city is essential to a key route linking eastern Syria to Iraq. However, in the hours following, IS launched a counteroffensive and retook al-Bukamal, with the Syrian Free Army suffering significant casualties.

As of 10 May 2017, IS has maintained control over al-Bukamal and the key route linking Syria and Iraq. IS has additionally conducted attacks near the Waled-Tanif Border Crossing to the south, and west of Mosul in the north. The significant territorial control ISIL maintains surrounding al-Bukamal allows for relatively easy passage between the two nations.

== Lebanon ==
The Syrian Civil War has led to incidents of sectarian violence in northern Lebanon between supporters and opponents of the Assad government, and armed clashes between Sunnis and Alawites in Tripoli. Fighting between rebels and government forces has spilled into Lebanon on several occasions. The Syrian Arab Air Force has conducted air strikes on targets in Lebanon, while rebels have launched rockets on Hezbollah targets. Fighting between supporters of the Sunni sheikh Ahmed Al-Assir, who is against Hezbollah's involvement in Syria, and the Lebanese army has killed at least 15 of its soldiers.

=== Lebanese–Syrian border ===
At the beginning of summer 2012, two Hezbollah militants were killed in a clash with Syrian rebels who were on Lebanese territory. On 17 September, Syrian Ground-attack aircraft fired three missiles 500 metres (1,600 ft) over the border into Lebanese territory near Arsal. It was suggested that the jets were chasing rebels in the vicinity. The attack prompted Lebanese president Michel Sleiman to launch an investigation, whilst not publicly blaming Syria for the incident.

On 22 September 2012, a group of armed members of the Free Syrian Army attacked a border post near Arsal. This was reported to be the second incursion within a week. The group were chased off into the hills by the Lebanese Army, who detained and later released some rebels due to pressure from dignified locals. Michel Sleiman praised the actions taken by the military as maintaining Lebanon's position being "neutral from the conflicts of others". He called on border residents to "stand beside their army and assist its members." Syria has repeatedly called for an intensified crackdown on rebels that it claims are hiding in Lebanese border towns. In October 2012, Hassan Nasrallah denied Hezbollah members were fighting alongside the Syrian army, but that Lebanese in Syria were only protecting Lebanese inhabited villages from the Free Syrian Army.

In August 2014, the Syrian air force bombed the Lebanese side of the border. In December of that year, they used barrel bombs on suspected rebel installations northwest of Arsal.

=== Lebanon vs. IS and al-Nusra Front ===
From 2–5 August 2014, the Lebanese Army clashed with Syrian gunmen in the town of Arsal, which left over a hundred soldiers on both sides dead.

On 21 August 2014, the al-Nusra Front invaded Lebanon near Arsal and the Bekaa Valley town of Al-Fakiha. Following a battle between them and Hezbollah, seven Hezbollah fighters and 32 Syrian terrorists died in clashes around the Syrian village of Nahleh, just over the border from Arsal.

Dozens of hostages were taken back to Syria during the battle of Arsal. After fruitless negotiations, the Lebanese cabinet voted to authorize the army to invade Syria to free them on 4 September 2014, something that they have yet to do. There was another attempted invasion of Lebanon by a joint IS-Nusra force in early October, which was beaten back by Hezbullah, and in January 2015.

In December 2015, after over a year and a half in captivity, Lebanese troops held prisoner by Al Nusra were exchanged for prisoners held in Lebanon.

=== Hezbollah vs. IS ===
In June 2015, the Hezbollah claimed that it was in the midst of a major battle with IS, which it claimed had invaded Lebanon and seized territory.

== Turkey ==
With a thousand-mile border with Syria and Iraq, there have been a number of incidents involving this nation with various factions in the conflicts south of the border.

=== Syrian–Turkish border clashes ===
Openly supporting the overthrow of Bashar al-Assad Turkey permitted the establishment of a "jihadist highway" where various rebels, including the Islamic State, were permitted to cross both supplies and personnel South of the border. There were various incidents including the shooting down of a Turkish Air Force jet by Syria which killed the 2 pilots and also the shooting down of a Syrian Air Force jet by Turkey, and a February 2015 raid by the Turkish army to evacuate a tiny exclave in Syria.

=== Turkey and ISIL ===
Turkey had been allegedly supporting ISIL throughout its many incarnations as a "lesser evil" against the Assad government. This to some extent began to change with the 2013 Reyhanlı bombings and a retaliatory airstrike in January 2014. ISIL shook this off and began its conquest of northern Iraq, followed by consolidation of territories in Northern Syria. In the summer of 2014, it began taking over the border area with Turkey, leading to hundreds of thousands of refugees coming north along the border, riots, the use of teargas, rubber bullets, and live ammunition, as well the end of the truce with the PKK.

A vote to authorize military action was passed by the Turkish parliament on 2 October 2014.

The relationship between ISIL and Turkey deteriorated during the spring and summer of 2015, leading to sniping at the border and airstrikes by the Turks.

=== Siege of the Süleyman Shah Tomb ===
On 22 February 2015, the Turkish army invaded Syria via Kobani and drove to the Tomb of Suleyman Shah, which was dismantled and brought back to Turkey. The 40 guards, who were due to return home months before, were also rescued. About 100 military vehicles, including 39 tanks, were involved along with 572 military personnel, one of which was killed in an accident.

Thirty to thirty-six Turkish soldiers were stationed there to guard the tomb. An attack on the tomb, considered Turkish territory under a 1921 Franco-Turkish agreement, was under threat earlier in the year, prompting the government to declare that it would retaliate against any such attack, and would serve as a casus belli.

The Syrian government said the raid was an act of "flagrant aggression" and that it would hold Ankara responsible for its repercussions.

=== Russian warplane downing ===
On 24 November 2015, a Russian warplane was shot down in the Syrian-Turkey border area. Turkey claims the plane violated Turkish airspace, a claim Russia denies. Early reports from multiple Russian news agencies indicated that the plane had been downed by a ground-based strike from Syrian rebels, but Russian officials later confirmed the Turkish reports that the plane had been downed by Turkish fighter jets. According to Turkish officials, the Russian jet, an SU-24, was shot down by two Turkish F-16 jets after multiple requests (10 requests in a five-minute span) for the Russian jet to change its course. Turkey maintains that the Russian jet violated its airspace, flying over Turkish territory despite warnings to change course, while Russia states that its jet never entered Turkish airspace and was over Syria the whole time. Turkey produced a graphic showing the Russian plane's flight pattern, which appears to show it crossing the southern tip of Hatay Province before being shot down and crashing near Turkmen Mountain near the Syria-Turkey border.

Turkey had previously warned Russia about violations to Turkish airspace, and had also warned them of strikes against civilian Syrian Turkmen living along the Turkish border. Russia has steadfastly maintained "throughout its flight, the aircraft remained exclusively above Syrian territory." In response, Russian president Vladimir Putin stated that the attack was "a stab in the back by the accomplices of terrorists."

=== Kurdish conflict ===
The 2015 conflict between Turkey and the PKK broke out following two year-long peace negotiations, which began in late 2012, but failed to progress in light of the growing tensions on border with Syria in late 2014, when the Siege of Kobani created an unprecedented wave of Kurdish refugees into Turkey. Some of the Kurds accused Turkey of assisting the Islamic State of Iraq and the Levant (ISIL) during the crisis, resulting in widespread Kurdish riots in Turkey involving dozens of fatalities. The tensions further escalated in summer 2015 with the 20 July bombing in Suruç, allegedly executed by an ISIL-affiliated Turkish group against Kurdish supporters. On 21 July, the PKK killed a Turkish soldier and wounded 2 more in Adıyaman. Some PKK supporters then claimed responsibility for 23 July killing of two Turkish police officers in Ceylanpinar, describing it as a retaliation.

== Jordan ==
There have been several incidents on the 375 km long border between Syria and Jordan. Jordan hosts nearly 600,000 registered Syrian refugees—although Jordanian officials say the total number is 1.4 million.

Heavy shelling aimed at Daraa in Syria has accidentally hit the Jordanian side of the border from time to time, usually causing only light or no damage. However, there have been occurrences where armed men have been killed or injured in engagements with Jordanian border patrols soldiers.

In April 2014, the Jordanian Air Force launched an airstrike on soldiers trying to illegally cross the border from Syria. Since then, attempted militant infiltration into Jordan has become commonplace. Some of this was due to the return of Jordanian citizens who, as jihadists, went to fight in Syria for a while and decided to go home for various reasons. According to reports, there are over 2000 Jordanian Jihadis fighting in Syria. Over a hundred have been arrested and charged for crossing the border to fight, which is illegal in Jordan.

Since October 2014, Jordan has been an active part of the anti-ISIS coalition, contributing to the American-led campaign of airstrikes.

Two incidents occurred in January 2016. On 23 January Jordanian armed forces spokesman stated that a total of 36 armed men tried to infiltrate the border and an engagement with Jordanian border patrol left 12 dead while the rest retreated back into Syria. They were found to have 2,000,000 drug pills. The spokesperson also stated that "Jordan will not tolerate any infiltration attempt and will strike with an iron fist to whoever tries to disrupt Jordanian national security".

On 25 January, two armed men tried to infiltrate the borders and were killed. They were found to have 2600 palm-sized bags of cannabis and 2.4 million Captagon pills.

== Syrian–Israeli ceasefire line ==
On 25 September 2012, several mortar shells landed in the Israeli-occupied Golan Heights, landing in an open area adjacent to the border fence. Overall, throughout October and early November, several Syrian mortar and light artillery shells hit the Golan Heights. One mortar round may have been responsible for a brushfire that erupted in the area. On 3 November, three Syrian tanks entered the demilitarized zone in the central Golan Heights as a number of mortar shells were fired into the area. On 5 November, an Israeli army jeep was damaged by Syrian army gunfire as it patrolled the border. On 11 November, after a Syrian 120 mm mortar round hit the eastern Golan Heights, the Israeli army responded by firing an electro-optic anti-tank missile in the direction of a Syrian mortar crew, but they deliberately missed them, intending it as a warning shot. On 12 November, another Syrian mortar shell struck the Golan Heights, and Israeli tanks deployed along the border responded by targeting two Syrian mortar launchers. A direct hit was confirmed. A shell fired from Syria, where insurgents and government troops are locked in fierce fighting, exploded in the Israeli-occupied part of the Golan Heights plateau on Sunday, 14 July 2013.

On 22 and 23 June 2015 two ambulances transporting wounded Syrian rebels were attacked by Druze protesters in the Golan Heights. One of the injured persons was killed in the incident. The attacks followed an interview with a rebel who had been treated in Israel and promised to come back to Syria to fight against the Druze minority.

On 10 February 2018, an Iranian drone was reported to have entered Israeli airspace, which was shot down by the Israeli Air Force. In retaliation, the IAF struck Iranian targets inside Syria. During the attack on the Iranian targets, Syrian anti-air defense systems shot down an Israeli F-16 fighter jet.

== Distant spillover locations ==
=== Libya ===
The takeover of the city of Derna in Cyrenaica, Libya by the self-declared Islamic State of Iraq and the Levant (ISIL) took place in late 2014. In November 2014, Wilayat Darnah (the province of Darnah) or Wilayat Barqah (Province of Eastern Libya) was declared an integral part the so-called "Islamic State". ISIL controlled the city from October 2014 until it fell to the Shura Council of Mujahideen in Derna in June 2015 who were subsequently defeated by the Libyan National Army during the Battle of Derna.

ISIL in Libya posted a video online on 15 February 2015 depicting the killing of 21 Egyptian Copts. The video bore similarities to previous videos showing the "execution" of Western and Japanese hostages, including the orange jumpsuits worn by the victims and the method of killing by decapitation. Egypt responded to the video by launching airstrikes against targets in Derna.

=== Kuwait ===
On 26 June 2015, ISIL militants blew up a Shiite mosque in Kuwait City killing dozens and injuring hundreds.

=== France ===
A campaign of Islamist attacks occurred in France, beginning with the Île-de-France attacks on 7 January 2015, between the French Government and ongoing terrorist acts committed by jihadist terror groups like AQAP and ISIL, or isolated individuals who sympathise with the jihadist movement. Since 2015 and until July 2016, eight Islamic terrorist incidents have occurred in France, including fatal attacks in Île-de-France, Saint-Quentin-Fallavier and Paris. The November 2015 attacks in Paris were motivated by ISIL as a "retaliation" for the French role in Syrian Civil War and Iraqi War.

=== Bangladesh ===
A majority of attacks by Islamic extremists in Bangladesh since October 2015 have been claimed by ISIL. In November 2015, the ISIL magazine Dabiq published an article calling for the "revival of jihad in Bengal". Since then, radical Islamic militants have assassinated Bangladeshi secularists, atheists, writers, bloggers, LGBT activists, Sufi and liberal Muslims, Hindu and Buddhist priests and Christian missionaries, as well as foreign expatriates from Europe and East Asia. On 1 July 2016, six gunmen stormed an upmarket restaurant in Bangladesh's capital Dhaka, killed customers of various nationalities and held hostages for nearly 12 hours, before the Bangladesh army ended the siege. ISIL claimed credit for the attack and reportedly released photographs of both the gunmen and victims from inside the restaurant during the hostage crisis.

== See also ==
- Timeline of the Syrian civil war
- Anbar campaign (2013–2014)
- European migrant crisis
- Refugees of the Syrian civil war
- Islamic terrorism in Europe
- Iran–Saudi Arabia proxy conflict
- List of modern conflicts in the Middle East
- List of ongoing armed conflicts
- List of wars by death toll
- List of wars involving Syria
- List of wars involving Iraq
- List of wars involving Iran
- List of wars involving Kurdistan Region
- List of wars involving Israel
- List of wars involving Jordan
- List of wars involving Lebanon
- List of wars involving Saudi Arabia
- List of wars involving Turkey
