= Daraa Border Crossing =

- Coordinates: 32°36′11″N 36°04′56″E
- Carries: Commercial Goods, Vehicles, Train
- Crosses: Border between Jordan and Syria
- Locale: Ar Ramtha, Jordan; Daraa, Syria
- Official name: Daraa Border Crossing مركز درعا الحدودي

The Daraa Border Crossing (Arabic: مركز درعا الحدودي) is an international border crossing between Syria and Jordan. It is located between the cities of Daraa in Syria and Ar Ramtha in Jordan. It is situated along the Damascus-Amman section of the Hejaz Railway.

During the Syrian Civil War, rebel forces took control of the crossing in September 2013.

On 10 July 2018, the Syrian army recaptured the old Daraa Border Crossing.
