= Jordanian–Syrian border incidents during the Syrian civil war =

Fighting on Jordanian-Syrian border, 2012-2017

Jordanian–Syrian border incidents
- Part of Spillover of the Syrian Civil War and the Jordanian intervention in the Syrian civil war
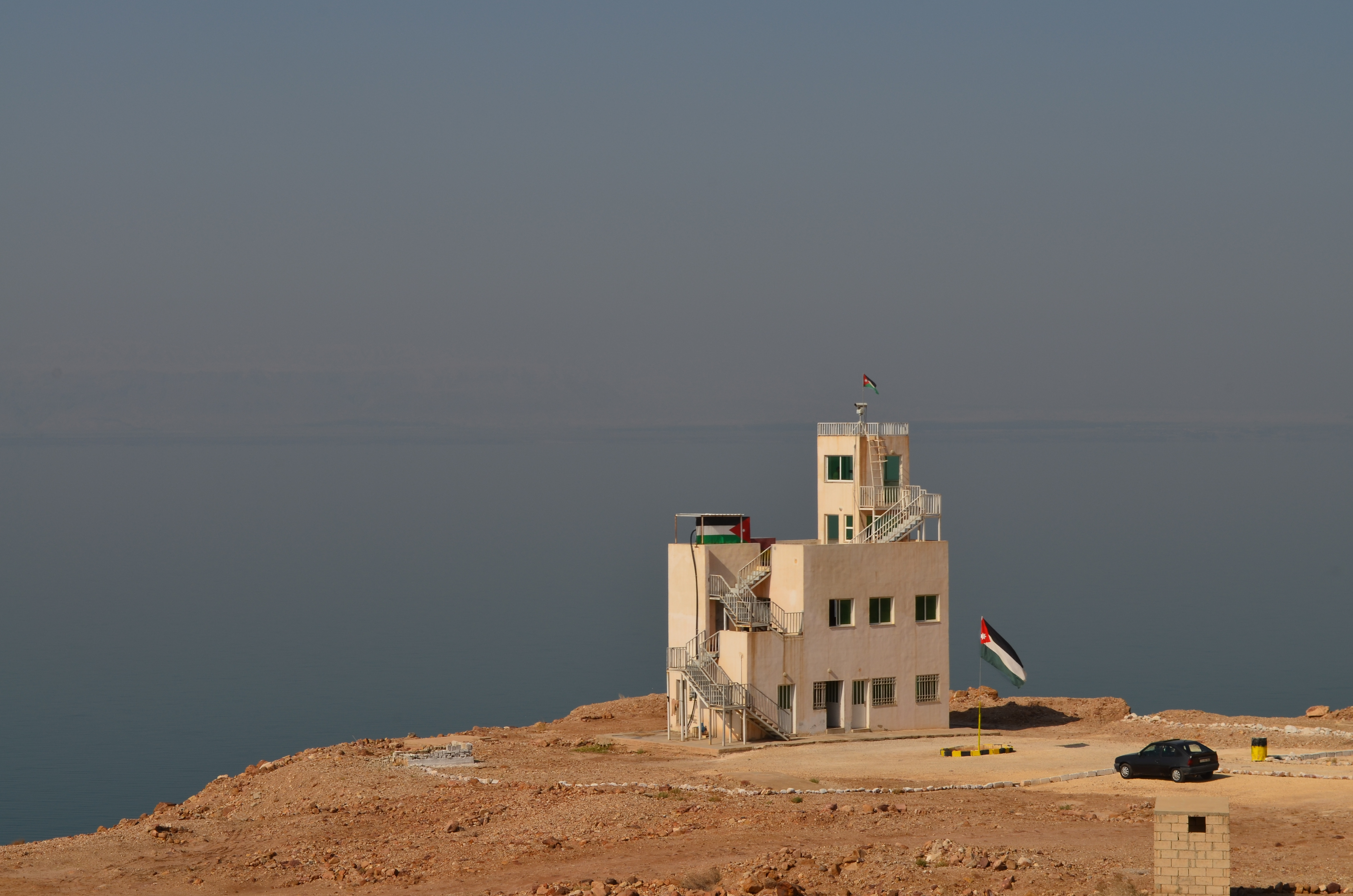
- Jordanian border patrol outpost
Date	10 August 2012 – 31 July 2018 (5 years, 1 week and 5 days)
Location	Jordanian-Syrian border
Result	Jordanian victory; Jordan restores control over the Jordanian-Syrian border; Syrian government loses a majority of the borders; All infiltration attempts into Jordan foiled.

Belligerents
Jordan (Syrian opposition) Free Syrian Army; Supported by: United States Ahrar al-Sham Hay'at Tahrir al-Sham	Islamic State: Khalid ibn al-Walid Army	Syria; Hezbollah Supported by: Iran; Russia

Commanders and leaders
(Jordan) Abdullah II (Jordan) Mashal Mohammad Al-Zaben (Jordan) Mahmoud Freihat (Jordan) Cpl. Mohammed Ali al-Manasir †	(Islamic State) Abu Bakr al-Baghdadi (Islamic State) Abu Mohammad al-Adnani † (Islamic State) Abu Hashim al-Shami † (Islamic State) Abu Muhammad al-Maqdisi †	(Ba'athist Syria) Bashar al-Assad (Ba'athist Syria) Maher al-Assad (Ba'athist Syria) Ali Abdullah Ayyoub

Casualties and losses
21 killed and Several injured	78 killed and injured	Unknown

The Jordanian–Syrian border incidents during the Syrian civil war, also known as the Jordanian-Syrian border conflict, were a series of violent incidents took place on the arid 379 km (235 mi) Jordan–Syria border over the course of the Syrian Civil War.

The Raytheon defence company provided the Jordanian Armed Forces with a high-tech security system on the border between the two countries. The system allowed the Jordanian border patrol units to detect and respond to border infiltrations. The system detected the movement of militias before they reached Jordanian territory and issued warnings. If the warnings were ignored, the Jordanians opened fire according to established rules of engagement.Jordan said that drug smuggling attempts had increased three-fold since the start of the Syrian civil war.

== Overview ==
Overview as of 17 March 2017.

	2015	2016	2017	Total
Number of infiltrations	85	79	24	188
Number of people involved	132	151	65	348

== Timeline ==
=== 2012 ===
In October 2012, Islamic militants attempted to infiltrate Jordan from Syria during the Syrian civil war. One militant was severely injured and 4 were killed The clash resulted in the death of one Jordanian soldier, the first Jordanian military personnel to be killed during the Syrian civil war. 13 IS members involved were arrested while the rest retreated back to Syrian territory.

=== 2014 ===
Operation resolved barn
- Part of Syrian civil war
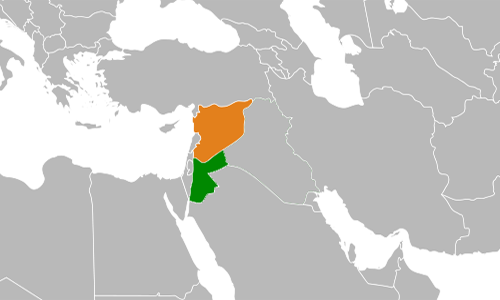
- Jordan and Syria
- Objective: Destroy a convoy attempting to penetrate Jordan
- Date: 16 April 2014
- Executed by: Royal Jordanian Air Force
- Outcome: Destruction of the convoy
- Casualties: 2 killed 10 injured

On 16 April 2014, the Jordanian Air Force bombed a convoy of vehicles on the Syrian-Jordanian border. Reportedly, the airstrike took place when the convoy attempted to penetrate the Jordanian border from Syria.

Though Syrian involvement was proposed, a Syrian military official said the vehicles did not belong to the Syrian army. A Jordanian security source said the targets appeared to have been Syrian rebels with machine guns mounted on civilian vehicles who were seeking refuge from fighting with government forces in southern Syria.

=== 2016 ===
On 23 January, a group of 36 armed men tried to cross the border. An engagement with Jordanian patrol left 12 dead, while the rest retreated. They were found to have 2 million drug pills. The spokesperson stated that "Jordan will not tolerate any infiltration attempt and will strike with an iron fist to whoever tries to disrupt Jordanian national security".

On 25 January, two armed men were killed after trying to cross the border with 2600 palm-sized bags of marijuana and 2.4 million Captagon pills.

On 7 February, two men who tried to cross the border exploiting the foggy weather conditions were killed.The Jordanian spokesperson warned that anyone trying to infiltrate would face the same fate.

In another incident on 24 February, two vehicles attempted to cross the border in foggy weather, leaving one infiltrator dead and 6 injured. The infiltrators were taken into custody.

On 21 June, a booby-trapped car exploded at dawn near a Jordanian Armed Forces outpost in the northeastern end of Rukban, a remote makeshift Syrian refugee camp. The attack left 6 dead and 14 injured Jordanian soldiers. As a result, the Jordan-Syria border was declared a closed military zone. Jordanian minister of foreign affairs Nasser Judeh said in a press conference "we don't need a hideous terrorist attack like this one to prove to the world the legitimacy of our security concerns".

The government also stated that it would halt the expansion or construction of refugee camps. Following the incident, delivery of humanitarian aid to the area was stopped due to mounting security concerns. Only one food delivery was allowed after the attack although water delivery resumed two weeks later. As of September 2016, around 75,000 Syrian refugees were stranded in the Rukban area under extremely poor living conditions. Due to the lack of access to medical care and clean water, the spread of diseases increased and there were many disease-related deaths.

On 8 September 2016, a vehicle trying to infiltrate into Jordan was destroyed by the Jordanian border guards while it was still in Syrian territory.

3 infiltrators were killed as they approached the Jordanian border from Syria on 27 October 2016.

=== 2017 ===
A car explosion on 22 January 2017 at the Rukban refugee camp caused 11 deaths among Syrian refugees.

Seven individuals attempted to cross the border on 17 March 2017, an engagement with the border guards killed three while the rest retreated back to Syria. They were found to have large amounts of narcotics.

An infiltration attempt was foiled on 27 March 2017, ended in the death of 3. The army reported that they were trying to smuggle drugs.

Jordanian F-16 fighter jets downed an unidentified drone on 11 May 2017, near the joint borders with Syria.

Three militants on motorbikes attempted to target a Jordanian border outpost in Rukban on 3 June 2017. They were all killed, while a Jordanian soldier suffered an arm injury.

9 vehicles were destroyed and 5 infiltrators were killed on 11 June.

Border guards killed 2 infiltrators on 22 August.

== Statistics ==
A report by the Jordanian Armed Forces command claimed that during 2015, border guard patrols foiled 85 infiltration attempts involving 132 people. Infiltrating vehicles that did not meet engagement rules and were not exterminated, were found to have 1,473 pieces of various weapons, 6,659 bullets, 16,768,684 Captagon pills, 893,060 palm-sized sheets of marijuana and 20,000 tramadol pills. The drugs were later destroyed at an anti-narcotics department in Amman.

== See also ==
- Jordan–Syria border
- Rukban
- Rukban refugee camp
