= Jordan–Syria border =

International border

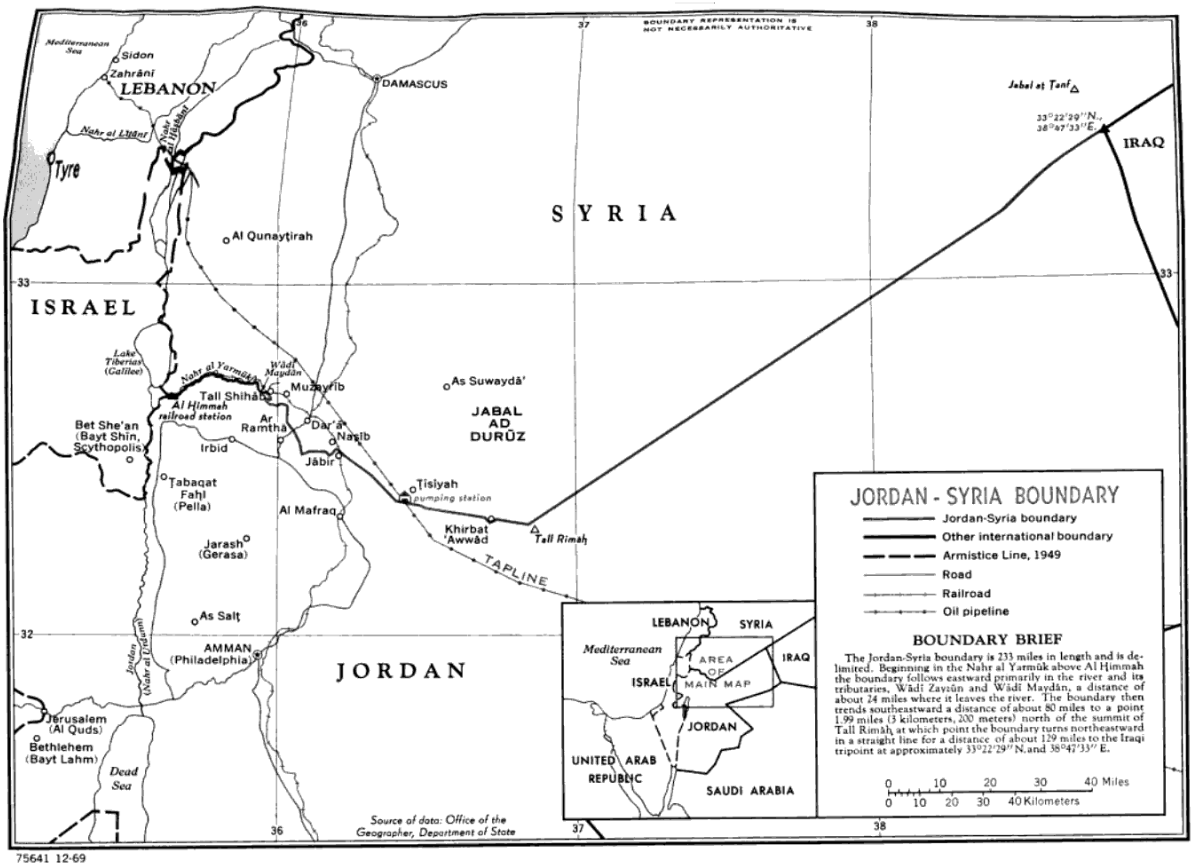
Map of the Jordan-Syria border

The Jordan–Syria border is 362 km (225 m) in length and runs from the tripoint with Israel in the west to the tripoint with Iraq in the east.

== Description ==
The border starts in the west at the tripoint with Israel, though the precise location of the tripoint is at present unclear owing to the Israeli occupation of the Golan Heights, which are claimed by Syria. The de jure tripoint lies immediately east of the Israeli town of Sha'ar HaGolan, whereas the de facto tripoint lies at the border's junction with the United Nations UNDOF Zone south-east of Metzar.

The Jordan-Golan Heights border runs along the Yarmouk River, and this river then continues as the westernmost section of the Jordan–Syria border proper. The border leaves the river just east of Al-Turrah, and a series of irregular and short straight lines then proceeds to the south-east, passing between Ar Ramtha and Daraa across the Daraa Border Crossing and on to the Nasib Border Crossing on the Amman–Damascus road. At 32.3112°N 36.8382°E it turns north-east, running in a straight line across the Syrian Desert, terminating at the Iraqi tripoint at 33.3747°N 38.7936°E.

== History ==
At the start of the 20th century the Ottoman Empire controlled what is now Jordan and Syria. During the First World War an Arab Revolt, supported by Britain, succeeded in removing the Ottomans from most of the Middle East. As a result of the secret 1916 Anglo-French Sykes–Picot Agreement the Ottoman Vilayet of Syria was split in two, with France gaining the north and Britain the south. France's section was then organised into the Mandate for Syria and the Lebanon. Britain's section (roughly, modern western Jordan) was contested between Britain, the newly formed Arab Kingdom of Syria, Zionists in the new Mandate for Palestine, and further south Ibn Saud of the new kingdom of Saudi Arabia, resulting in a confused period in which the region was essentially an ungoverned space. Eventually in 1921 Britain declared a formal mandate over the region, creating the Emirate of Transjordan under the semi-autonomous rule of King Abdullah I.

In the period of 1920–1923, France and Britain signed a series of agreements, collectively known as the Paulet–Newcombe Agreement, which created the modern Jordan-Syria and Iraq–Syria borders, as an amendment to what had been designated the A zone in the Sykes–Picot Agreement. A more detailed description of the Jordan–Syria border was agreed upon on 31 October 1931.

In 1967 Israel occupied the Golan Heights following the Six-Day War, thereby bringing the westernmost section of the border under their control. There have been a number of incidents along the frontier since the start of the Syrian Civil War in 2011.

Jordan’s last remaining territorial dispute was resolved in February 2005, when the interior ministers of Jordan and Syria signed an agreement ending more than 30 years of controversy over the exact demarcation of their mutual border through a land-swap arrangement in their border region.

== Settlements near the border ==
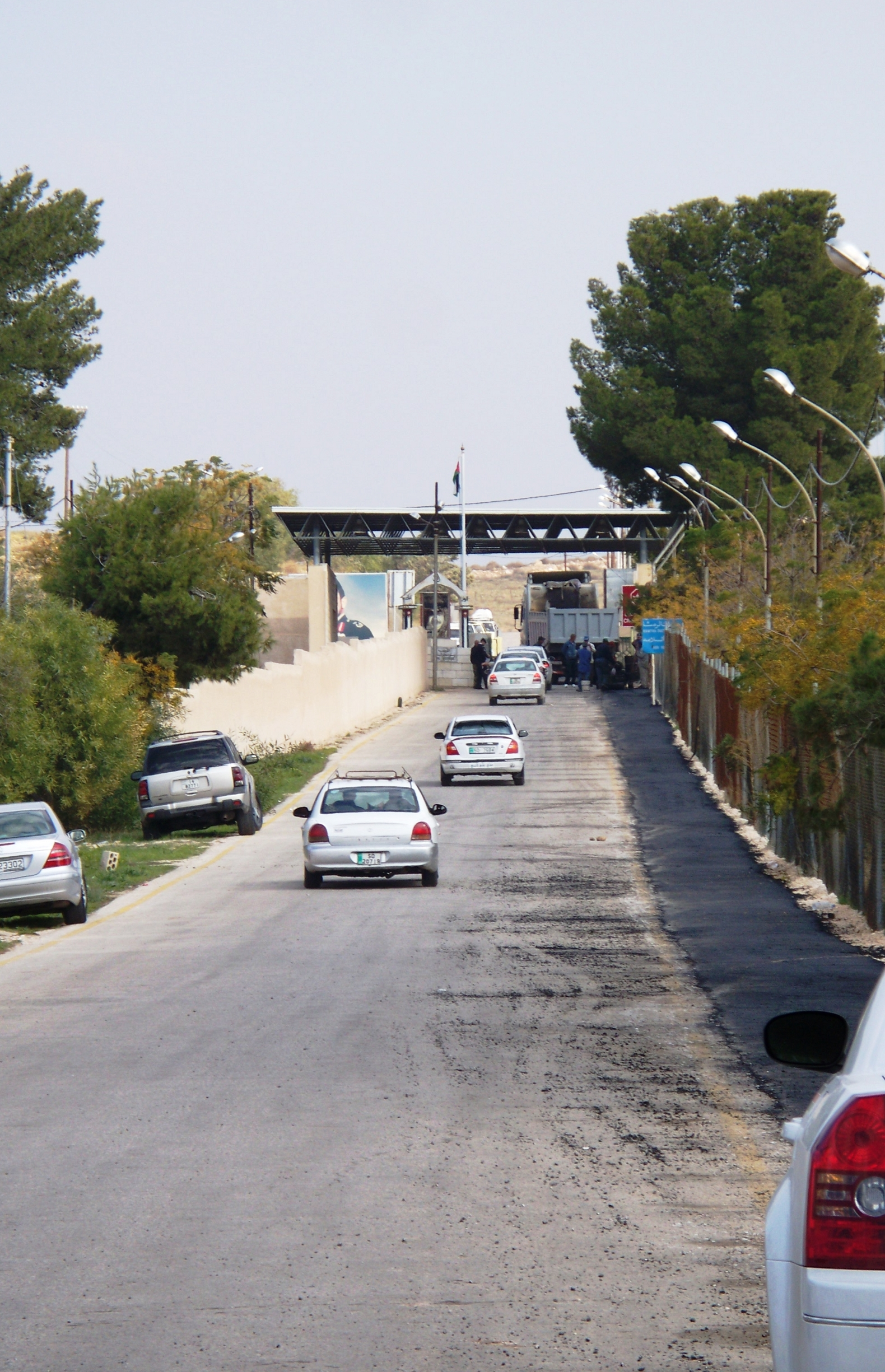
Border crossing between Jordan and Syria

=== Jordan ===
- Al-Turrah
- Ar-Ramtha
- Sama
- Ed Dafyana

=== Syria ===
- Al-Shajara
- Sahm al Julan
- Muzayrib
- Daraa
- At Tayyibah
- Dhibin
- Umm ar Rumman
- Al-Ghariyah al-Gharbiyah
- Rukban refugee camp

== Border crossings ==
- Nasib Border Crossing
- Daraa Border Crossing

== See also ==
- Jordan–Syria relations
- Jordanian–Syrian border incidents during the Syrian civil war
